= Union Building, Aldershot =

Building in Aldershot, Hampshire, England

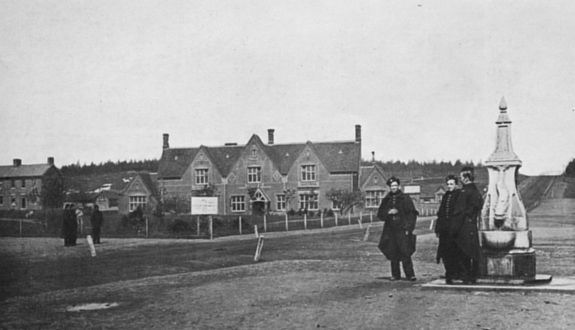
The Union Building in Aldershot in 1870

The Union Building on Hospital Hill in Aldershot in Hampshire is a Grade II listed building on the Register of Historic England. A former sub-manor of the Tichborne Family, it was later used as the Aldershot Workhouse and as the District School set up in 1849/50 by two poor law unions, referred to as the Union Building in the 1851 Census. It was later purchased as one of the first permanent Camp buildings of the British Army when it moved to the area in 1854.

== Manor house ==
The building dates from c. 1629 when it was built as a sub-manor for Sir Richard Tichborne (1578–1657), who had succeeded to the Tichborne baronetcy, Aldershot being closer to London than the family seat at Tichborne Park. Sir Richard was a Gentleman of the Bedchamber to Charles I. He and his younger brother, Sir Walter Tichborne, sons of Sir Benjamin Tichborne, had earlier settled in Aldershot having each married two of the daughters of Sir Robert White, who owned the manor at Aldershot. The family seat was at Aldershot Park but this became run down and when Charles I visited in August 1627 a Spanish Ambassador asked to have an urgent audience. To the embarrassment of the Tichbornes the king replied that the house at Aldershot was unfit for such a meeting and arranged it for the following week at Oatlands Palace, near Weybridge. This may have prompted Sir Richard to build his sub-manor, the present Union Building. The branch of the Tichborne family at Aldershot ran themselves heavily into debt after building a new and more fashionable manor house in the present Manor Park in Aldershot in 1670 and sold their older sub-manor. Records show that in 1684 the new owner transferred the property to his father.

== Aldershot Workhouse ==
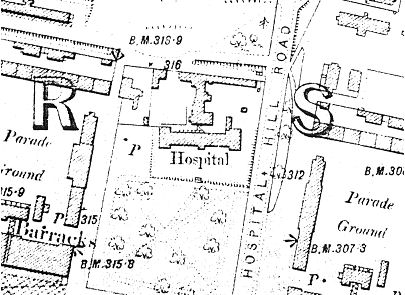
The former Aldershot Workhouse in a map of 1897

The Relief of the Poor Act 1782, also known as Gilbert's Act, was a British poor relief law proposed by Thomas Gilbert that allowed parishes to set up their own workhouses, which Aldershot did in 1808. Use of the Tichborne mansion as the Aldershott Workhouse in 1808 coincides with the passing of the Manor of Aldershot (sometimes spelt 'Aldershott' on maps of the area) to John Eggar of Bentley. In 1824 the Aldershot and Bentley parishes united under Gilbert’s Act to use the workhouse located in, and owned by, the parish of Aldershot. It could accommodate 40 individuals, and the Bentley parish paid the Aldershot parish £20 per year for its use.

William Newland's survey of 'Aldershott' in 1808 lists the extent of the workhouse grounds, giving a value of £12 and 10 pence for the four fields surrounding the building. The building was extended between 1838 and 1840 in the Jacobean style.

The census record for 1841 lists Joseph Miles (1794–1861) as Governor of Aldershott Workhouse with his wife Mary Miles (1796–1862) as Matron. Previous to his appointment as Governor Miles was said to be 'an army pensioner, who, by reason of being lame of one leg, blind of one eye, and deaf as a post, was judged fit to enact the part of parish constable' at Aldershot. Miles was not paid for this office but obtained some money 'which sometimes amounted to the sum of two shillings within the twelve months, resulting from the capture of a stray vagrant or two'. Miles later became a 'Carrier', and from 1858 to his sudden death from an accident in 1861 he served as Aldershot's town crier of whom "there was quite a procession when he was presented with a new bell ... He was a lame man, and he walked underneath a canopy which was carried by four other lame men."

In 1843 it was agreed that the paupers of the parish were to be removed to the Workhouse at Farnham at a charge of 3 shillings and six pence each a week. At the baptism of his children in 1847 and 1849 Francis Henning was recorded as the Master of Aldershot Workhouse, which probably finally closed in the latter year.

=== Union School ===
The building became redundant as a poorhouse in 1849 when Aldershot became part of the Farnham Poor Law Union and from 1850 it was used as a school for pauper children by the Farnham and Hartley Wintney School District.

== Military hospital ==
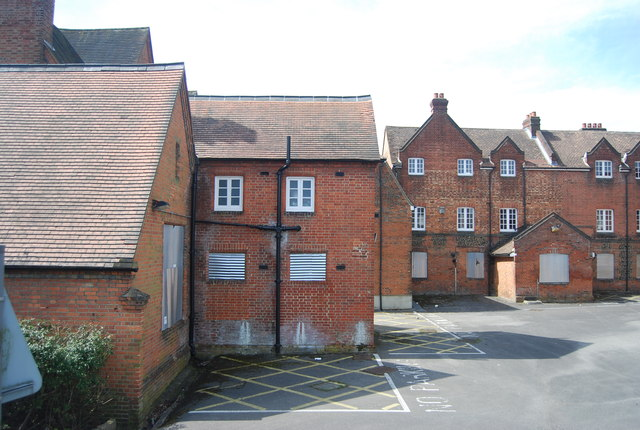
A boarded-up Union Building seen from the rear c. 2012

When a party of Royal Engineers arrived at Aldershot and set up camp on the site of the present Princes Gardens in November 1853 the area was heathland with the only building in sight being the Union Building. It was one of five permanent structures in the area bought in 1854 by the War Department as part of the development of the new Aldershot Camp, and was used by the Army from 1854 to 1879 as No 2 Station Hospital for the large military force moving into the area.

The hill the building is on was named 'Hospital Hill'. Because of its small size it could only accommodate the sick of two regiments and it quickly became apparent that the Union Building could not be a permanent hospital for the number of troops in Aldershot, so huts on the other side of Hospital Hill were utilised as additional hospital accommodation, together with further huts located in the North and South Camps. The building of the Cambridge Military Hospital in 1879 made the Union Building redundant as a hospital and it became the District Pay Office. Later additions were added at the rear including extensions and additional floors.

== Later years ==
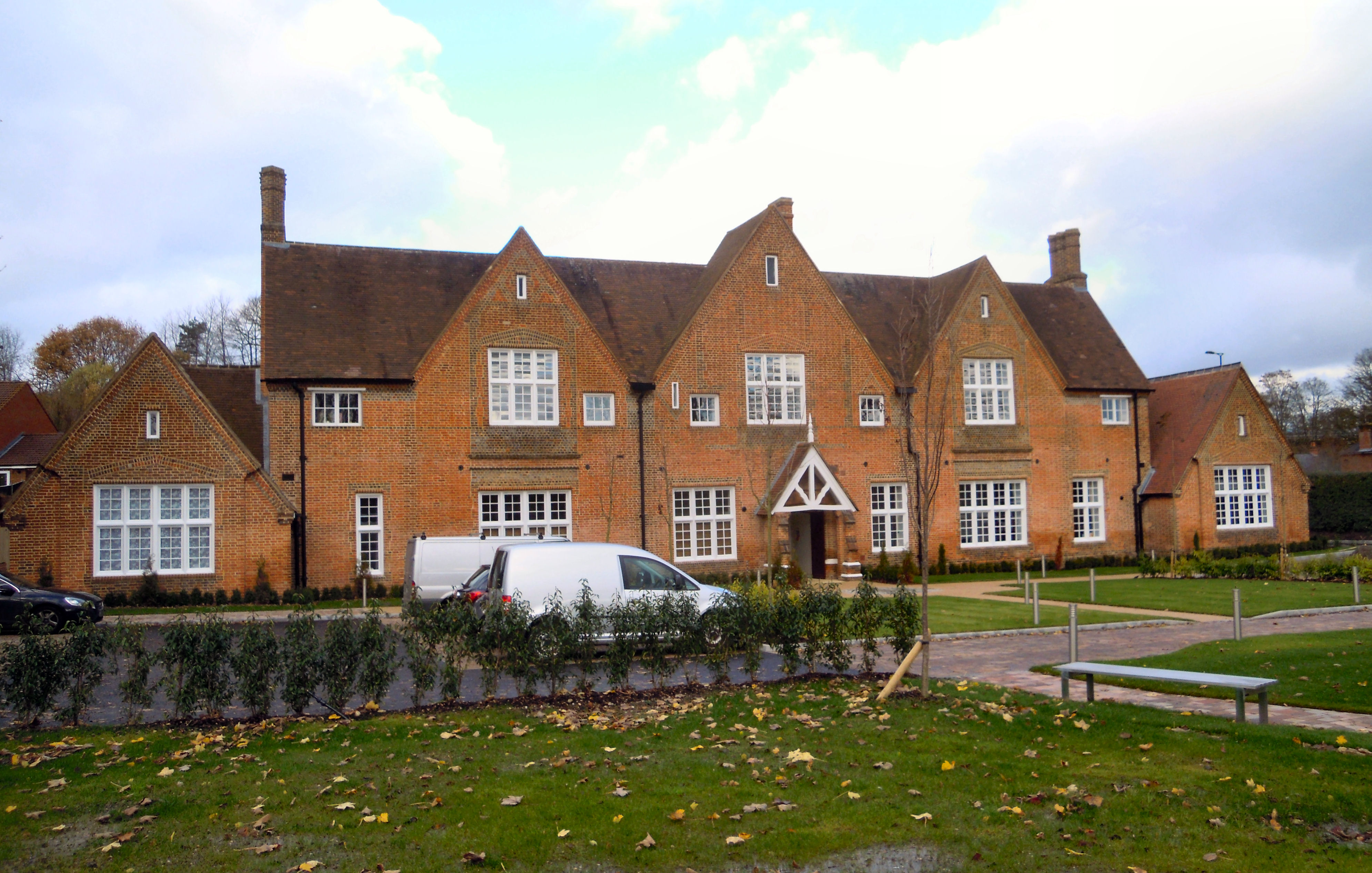
The Union Building in 2016

The building was almost completely destroyed in a fire in 1907 but was restored and it survived an incendiary attack during World War II. The building briefly served as a community centre for military families from 1986. Today it has been converted into flats.
