= Brickfields Country Park =

Small country park in Aldershot, Hampshire

Coordinates: 51°14′19″N 0°45′36″W

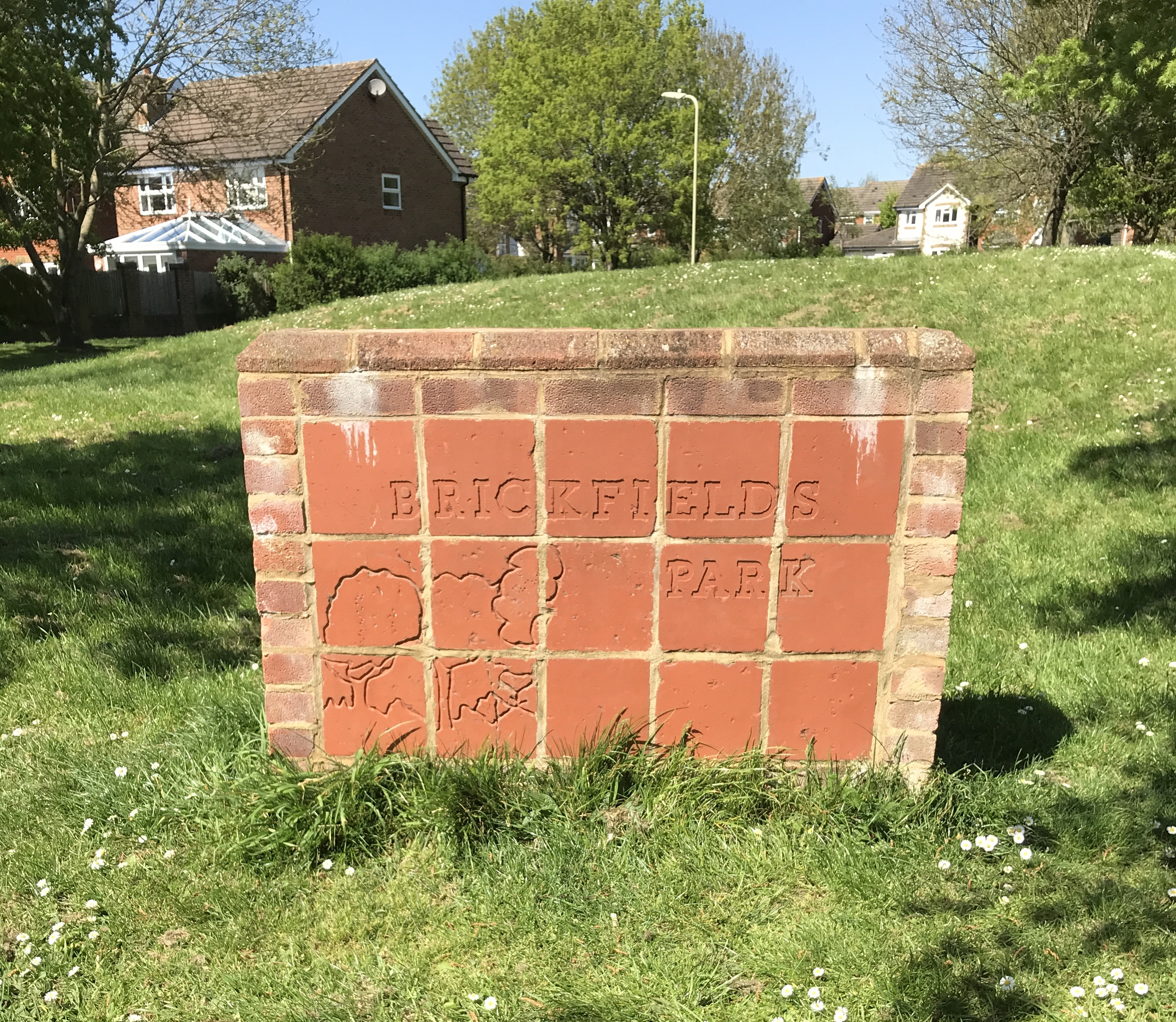
Sign for Brickfields Country Park

Brickfields Country Park is a park in Aldershot in Hampshire described as one of the smallest country parks in Britain. The park is owned and maintained by Rushmoor Borough Council.

Situated off Boxalls Lane, in Aldershot, Brickfields Country Park was reclaimed from the remains of a Victorian brickworks and clay diggings. Less than eight acres in size, making it one of the smallest country parks in the country, there is a large pond in the centre of the park which supports varied range of wildlife and plantlife, with a current total 666 species of flora and fauna having been recorded. This total comprises 397 plantlife species and 269 wildlife species. The park used to be the venue for an annual family summer event organised by the Friends of Brickfields Country Park.

The car park is signposted off Boxalls Lane, Aldershot, GU11 3QJ.

== History ==
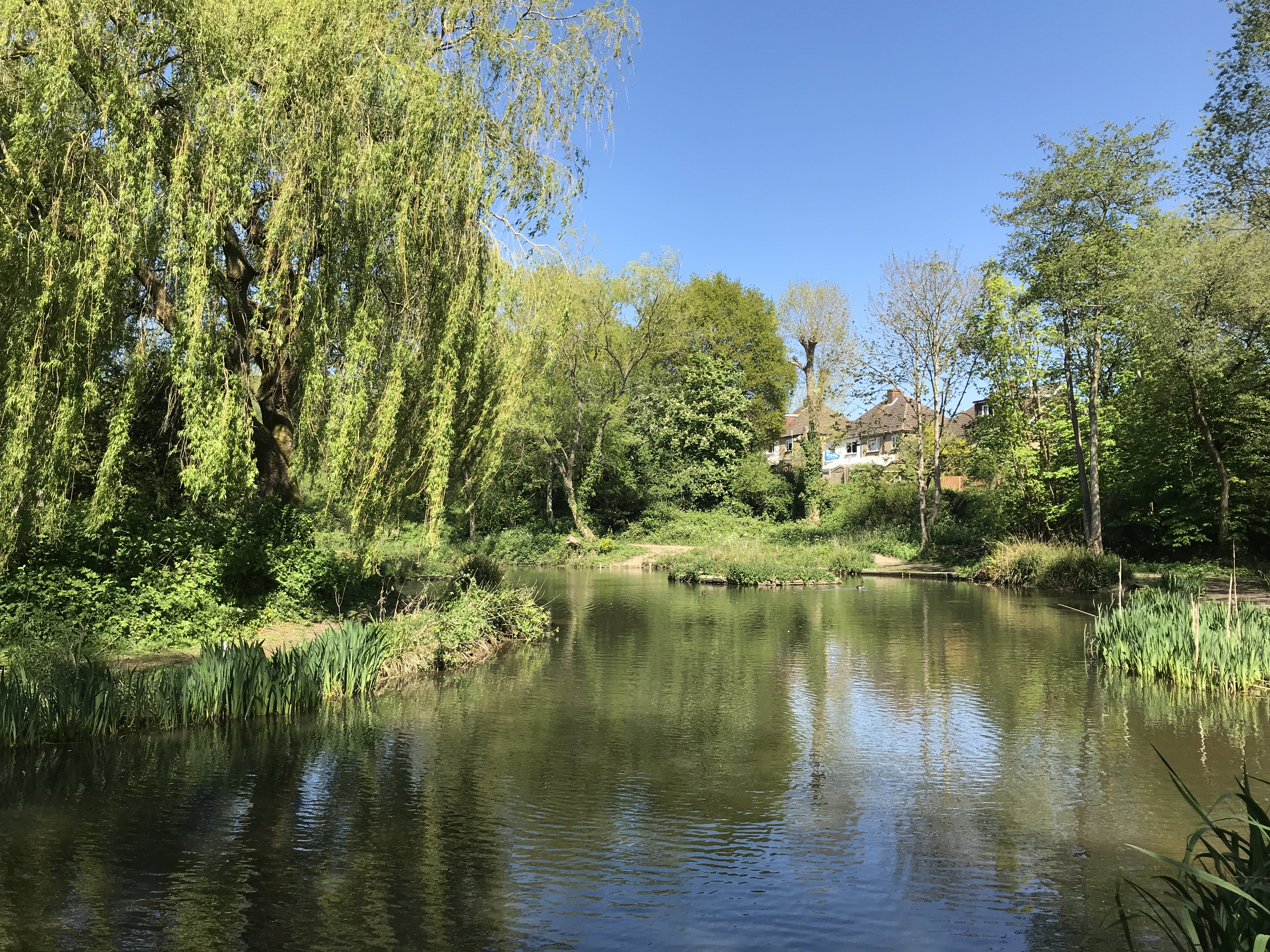
The pond at the centre of the park in 2020 after major restoration work

The earliest records regarding the land on which Brickfields Country Park now stands date to about 1175 when the monks of Waverley Abbey were given 31 acres of land for sheep grazing. Later an additional 29 acres to the east were rented by Adam the Cleric and Margaret of Overscumbe. For around 300 years the land would be worked by one monk assisted by seven clerics and after the Dissolution of the Monasteries it was bought by Robert White of Aldershot. The two areas of 31 acres and 29 acres were joined into one farm of 60 acres worked until early in the 1600s by John Faunteleroy, then a major landowner in Aldershot. By about 1650 the Boxall family owned the land, but in 1703 Sarah Boxall was in Court in London for non-payment of taxes resulting in the land being divided into small plots of which Boxalls Farm was the largest.

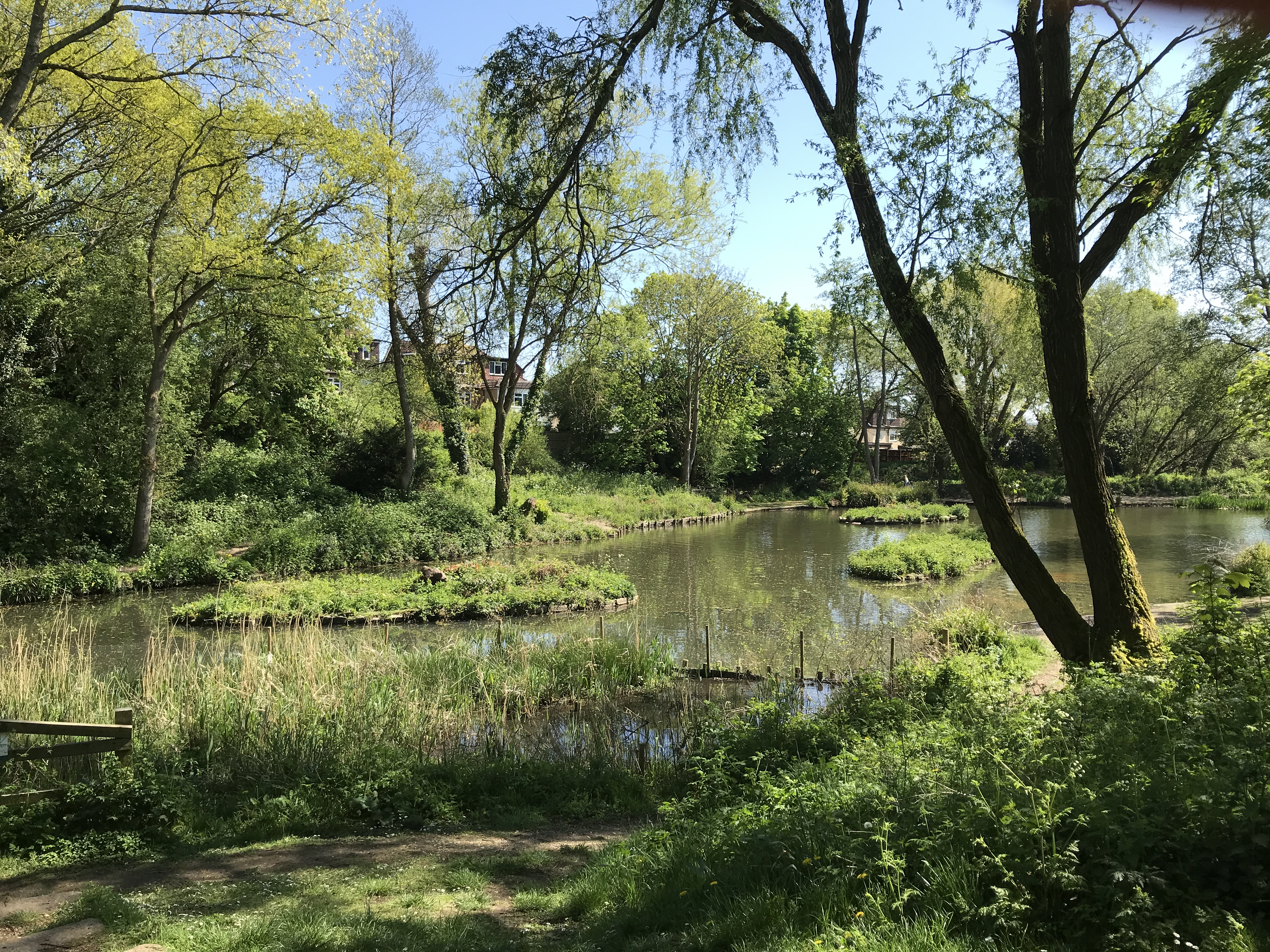
View of the pond

When the British Army arrived in Aldershot in 1854 there was an immediate and urgent need for brick-built barracks and houses for the rapidly growing Camp and town. The clay for these buildings was dug from several pits in the area, one of them being the pit dug by the newly formed Aldershot Brick and Tile Works on Boxalls Lane. The Victorian brickworks and drying ovens were in use until about 1940 and were located nearby on what is now the Brickfields housing estate. When the brickworks closed the area was used as a concrete works and storage area and latterly as a refuse dump until 1983 when work began to turn the wasteland into a country park as an amenity for the people of Aldershot. The pond was dug out to make it larger and designed to be fed by a storm water drainage ditch in the park. The park was opened on 7 June 1985 by Councillor Colin Balchin, the Mayor of Rushmoor and was named Brickfields Country Park following a public competition.

As of 2024 a new volunteer group are taking care of Brickfields Country Park following the loss of many of volunteers during the Covid pandemic. They have their own fledgling website at - www.brickfields.uk - but this is a work in progress. There was some content but currently it just shows a holding page.

== Status ==
Whilst the new group are listed in various social media as a "Nature Reserve" this is purely a self declared title. The new volunteer group for Brickfields Country Park are however working towards a future Local Nature Reserve (LNR) listing as the park fits the criteria for such a designation extremely well. Currently this effort is still an ongoing issue with Natural England, but as of September 2026, Brickfields Country Park still does not have any formal Nature Reserve (LNR or NNR) designation. Natural England LNR's list

== See also ==
- Aldershot Park
- Manor Park, Aldershot
- Municipal Gardens, Aldershot
- Princes Gardens, Aldershot
- Rowhill Nature Reserve
