= Rowhill Nature Reserve =

Nature reserve in Hampshire and Surrey, England

Coordinates: 51.241°N 0.778°W

Rowhill Copse
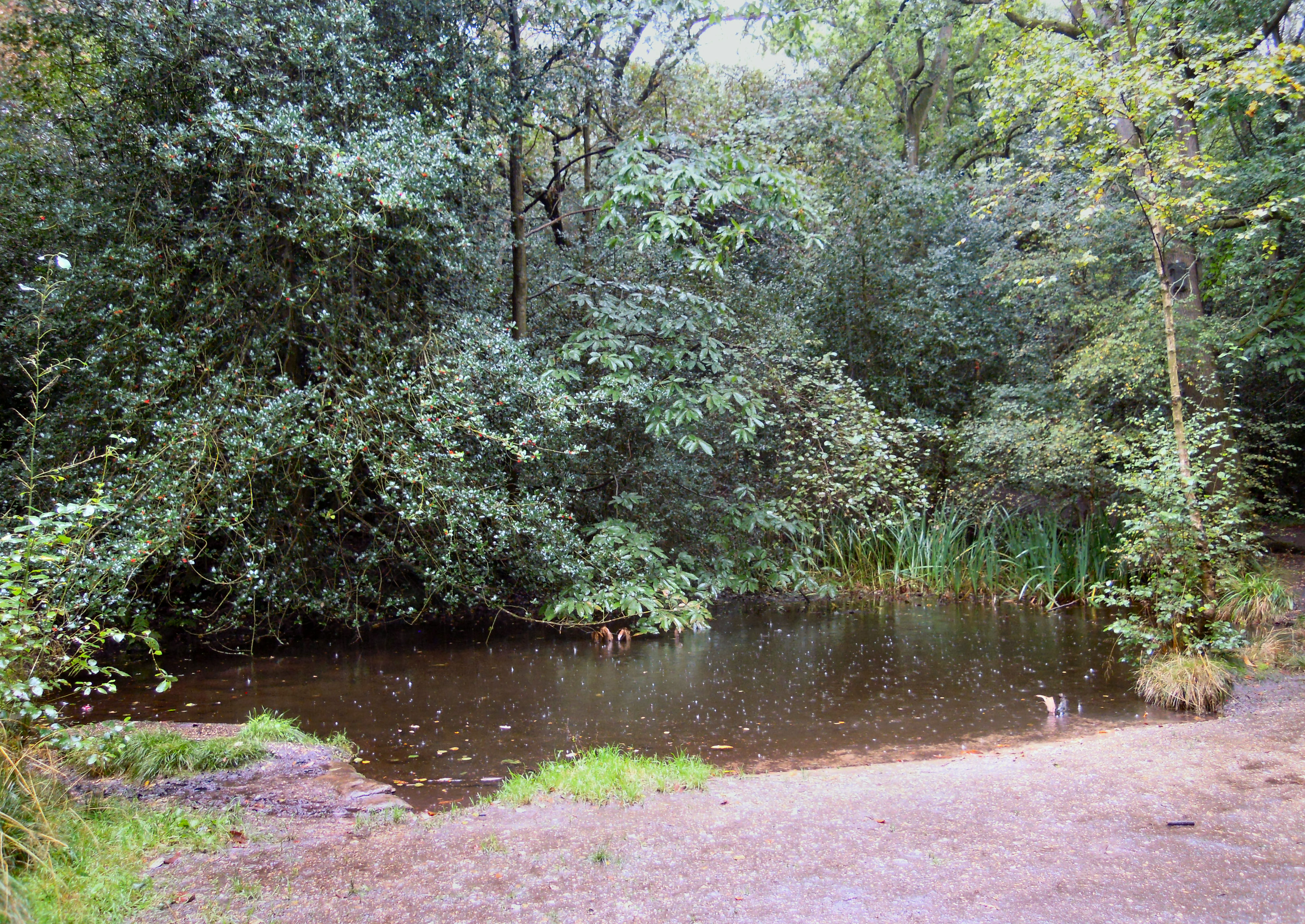
- Interactive map of Rowhill Copse
- Type: Local Nature Reserve
- Location: Farnham, Surrey
- OS grid: SU 897 478
- Area: 26.6 hectares (66 acres)
- Manager: Rowhill Nature Reserve Society

Rowhill Nature Reserve or Rowhill Copse is a 26.6-hectare (66-acre) Local Nature Reserve (LNR) which straddles the border between Aldershot in Hampshire and Farnham in Surrey. It is owned by Rushmoor Borough Council, was declared an LNR by Waverley Borough Council and is managed by Rowhill Nature Reserve Society.

This site is mainly coppiced woodland with hazel and sweet chestnut. There are also ponds, a stream, heath and marshland. It is the source of the River Blackwater.

Access points include Cranmore Lane.

== See also ==
- Aldershot Park
- Brickfields Country Park
- Manor Park
- Municipal Gardens, Aldershot
- Princes Gardens, Aldershot
