= Rowhill School, Aldershot =

Pupil referral school in Aldershot, Hampshire

Coordinates: 51.2474°N 0.7712°W

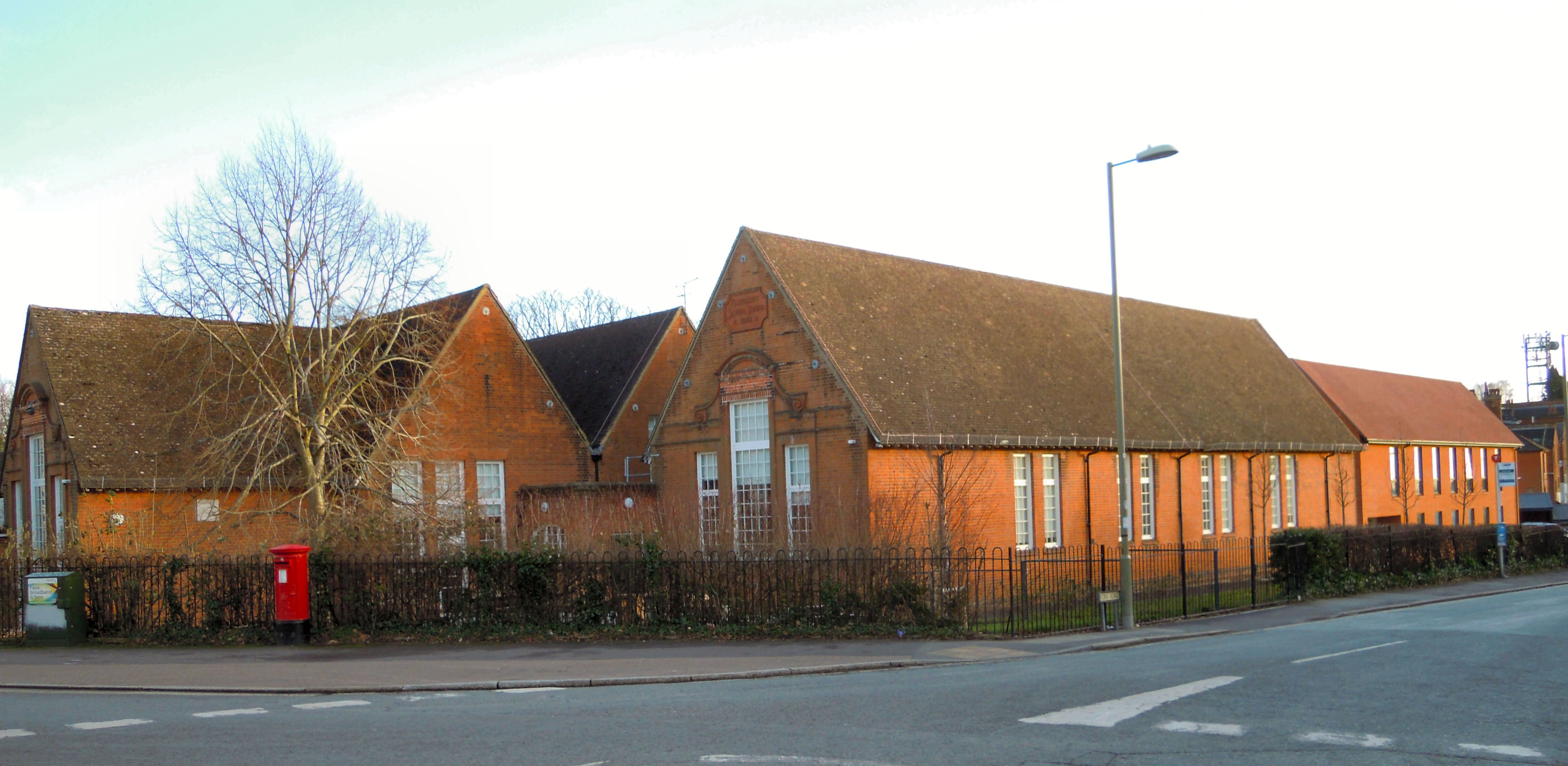
Rowhill School in Aldershot in 2018

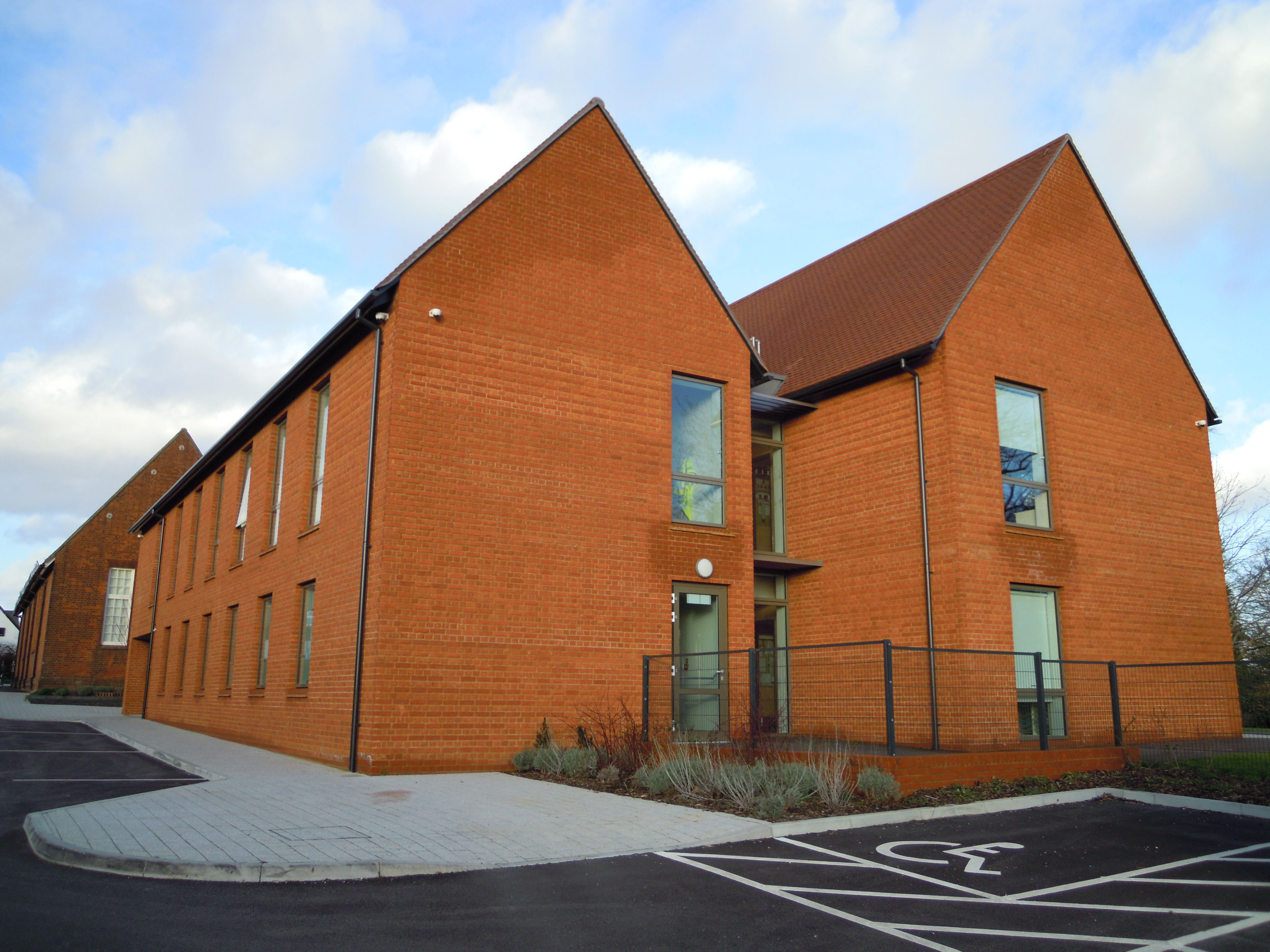
The school from the rear showing the modern extension

Rowhill School is a special school in Aldershot in Hampshire for vulnerable secondary school pupils aged 11 to 16 who are unable to attend mainstream secondary education for a variety of reasons, including being at risk of permanent exclusion or who cannot attend a mainstream setting for medical reasons. All pupils have a statement of special educational needs that is primarily for their behavioural, social and emotional difficulties. A significant number of pupils also have additional needs associated with, for instance, their autism or speech and language difficulties.

A pupil referral unit situated on York Road in Aldershot, the school opened in 2017 with new facilities after a £5.5 million refurbishment project on its Victorian premises. While the school has a capacity for 90 pupils the actual number on roll is actually in the low teens or less. The headteacher is Mrs Urmilla Choubae. The school was formerly the Linden Centre in Farnborough in Hampshire before relocating to the present site with its new name. As the Linden Centre the school received an Ofsted rating of "Good" after a full inspection in 2013, a rating that was endorsed for the new school following a short inspection in 2018.

Located in the redeveloped and extended former West End Infants’ School, built by the Aldershot School Board in 1898, the new school has a large two-storey extension with 12 classrooms, including science, food technology, design technology and hair and beauty studio, a hall, dining room, staff room and administrative offices and an outdoor workshop area.
