= Walter Tichborne =

Walter Tichborne (c.1580–1637) of Aldershot in Hampshire was MP for Petersfield from 1614 to 1621.

== Early life and marriage ==
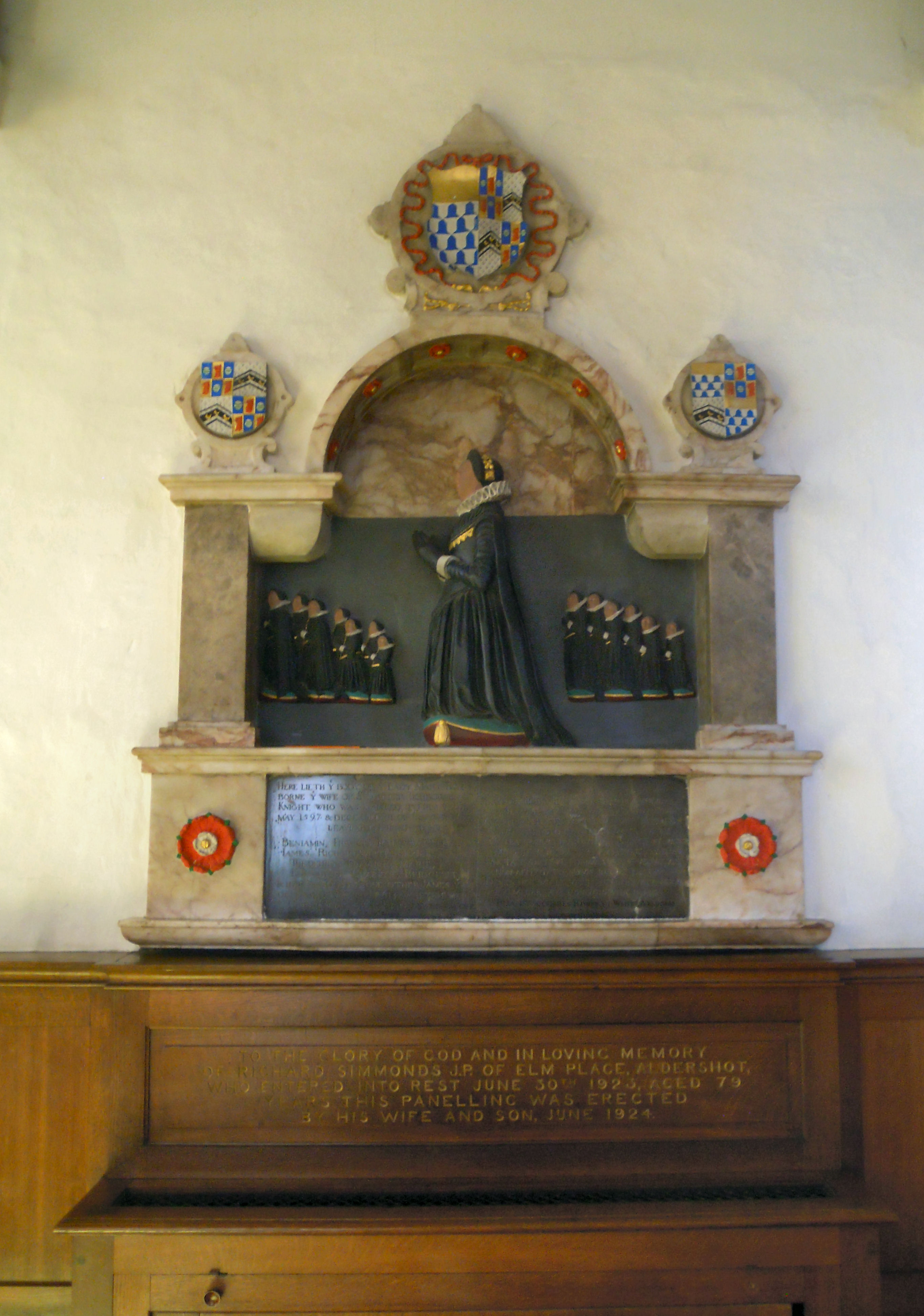
Memorial to Lady Mary Tichborne (d.1620) the younger daughter of Sir Robert White and wife of Sir Walter Tichborne – St Michael's church, Aldershot

He was born in about 1580, the second son of Sir Benjamin Tichborne, (died 1629), the first Tichborne baronet of Tichborne in Hampshire, and his second wife Amphillis Weston, daughter of Richard Weston, justice of the common pleas. His older brother was Sir Richard Tichborne, the second baronet. The Tichbornes were one of the leading Roman Catholic families in the county. He and his brother married two sisters, the co-heiresses of Sir Robert White of Aldershot, with Walter marrying Mary White (c.1581–1621) on 7 May 1597. According to his wife's memorial monument in St Michael's church in Aldershot (see right) they had seven sons and six daughters: Benjamin, Francis, John, Walter, James, Richard and Lionel. Their daughters were Theophila, Frances, Marie, Elisabeth, Charity and Bridget.

On their marriages the brothers joined their new wives at Aldershot in Hampshire. Walter Tichborne was knighted on 16 November 1604 by James I.

On the death of Sir Robert White in 1599 Walter Tichborne inherited his properties at Aldershot and other properties in Hampshire and Surrey and he built the Manor House in Aldershot Park. He and his brother were favourites of James I who was godfather to Walter's son James, born in 1611, and the king travelled to Aldershot for the christening at nearby St Michael's church. James I visited the Tichbornes in Aldershot at their mansion in Aldershot Park in 1618, 1622 and 1623. However, by the time of Charles I this was becoming run down. When Charles visited in August 1627 a Spanish Ambassador asked to have an urgent audience. To the embarrassment of the Tichbornes the king replied that the house at Aldershot was unfit for such a meeting and arranged it for the following week at Oatlands Palace near Weybridge. Possibly in response to the king's disdain for their manor house the Tichbornes built a sub-manor which was later sold and became the Union Workhouse for Aldershot.

== Public offices and career ==
Among the offices he held were: appointed Justice of the Peace (JP) for Surrey in 1610 and for Hampshire in 1614, holding both posts until his death; (from 1610 to his death; Lieutenant-Colonel in the Hampshire militia from 1625; Constable of Farnham Castle from 1632; a Freeman of Newport and Yarmouth on the Isle of Wight (1634); Commissioner for Piracy for Hampshire and the Isle of Wight (1635-6); Commissioner for the Recovery of Mortgaged Crown Lands (1618); Equerry of the Royal Stables (1625), and Gentleman of the Privy Chamber Extraordinary (1635–1637). He was MP for Petersfield from 1614 to 1621, probably having been elected with the support of Sir Richard Norton, a prominent Roman Catholic.

James I had been godfather to two of Tichborne's sons, and the king visited him at his manor at Aldershot in 1618, 1622 and 1623. In the summer of 1623 Tichborne was listed at the county assizes as being "out of the country", most likely while accompanying one of his daughters who entered a convent in Brussels as a nun. He remained out of the country at the time of the 1624 election.

== Roman Catholic beliefs ==
His involvement in Parliament was minimal mainly owing to his frequent absence. In May 1626 the House of Commons was informed that one of Tichborne's daughters had been convicted of recusancy while another was openly practising as a Catholic, and a third daughter was a nun at Brussels. However, Tichborne was omitted from the presentment of recusants at the request of his son, the lawyer Benjamin Tichborne, himself the MP for Petersfield since 1626.

== Later life ==
In March 1634 with his brother Sir Richard Tichborne he secured a bond of £200 to secure the repayment of £104. By 1635 Walter Tichborne had become deeply involved in the debts of his older brother and on receiving royal protection Sir William Uvedale among others was ordered by the king in June 1637 to attempt to reach a settlement with his creditors. This attempt was probably unsuccessful as he was outlawed shortly afterwards, and the manor of Aldershot extended.

Sir Walter Tichborne died just before the end of 1637, and apparently did not leave a will. He was buried in St Peter's church in Tichborne in Hampshire. His great-great-grandson Henry Tichborne (1710–1785) became the 6th Baronet Tichborne in 1748 on the death of his cousin John Hermengil Tichborne, a Jesuit priest and the 5th baronet.

Parliament of Great Britain
Preceded by William Hervey	Member of Parliament for Petersfield; 1593–1597; With: Walter Savage	Succeeded by Richard Norton
