= Aldershot =

Town in Hampshire, England

Coordinates: 51°14′54″N 00°45′41″W

- Town
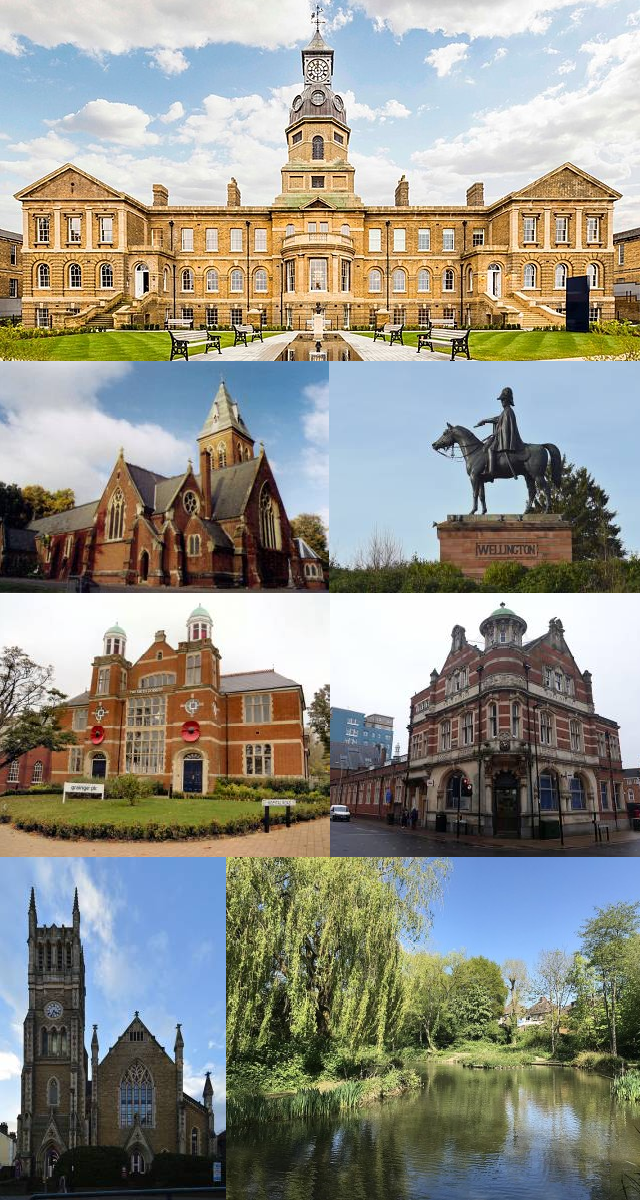
- Clockwise from top: Cambridge Military Hospital, equestrian statue of Arthur Wellesley, 1st Duke of Wellington, Aldershot Post Office, Brickfields Country Park, Wesleyan Chambers, Smith-Dorrien House and Royal Garrison Church

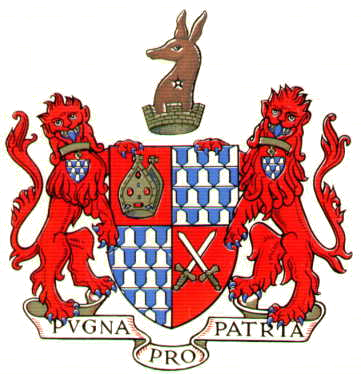
- Coat of arms

- Location within Hampshire
- Population: 40,160 (Rushmoor Borough Council data)
- OS grid reference: SU865505
  - London: 31.8 mi (51.2 km)
- District: Rushmoor
- Shire county: Hampshire
- Region: South East
- Country: England
- Sovereign state: United Kingdom
- Post town: ALDERSHOT
- Postcode district: GU11, GU12
- Dialling code: 01252
- Police: Hampshire and Isle of Wight
- Fire: Hampshire and Isle of Wight
- Ambulance: South East Coast
- UK Parliament: Aldershot

Aldershot (/ˈɔːldərʃɒt/ AWL-dər-shot) is a town in the Rushmoor district of Hampshire, England. It lies on heathland in the extreme north-east corner of the county, 31 mi (50 km) south-west of London. The town has a population of 40,160, while the Aldershot Urban Area – a loose conurbation, which also includes other towns such as Camberley and Farnborough – has a population of 243,344; it is the thirtieth-largest urban area in the UK.

Aldershot is known as the Home of the British Army, a connection which led to its rapid growth from a small village to a Victorian town.

== History ==
=== Early history ===
The name is likely to have derived from alder trees found in the area (from the Old English 'alor-sceat' meaning copse, or projecting piece of land, featuring alder trees). Any settlement, though not mentioned by name, would have been included as part of the Hundred of Crondall referred to in the Domesday Book of 1086.

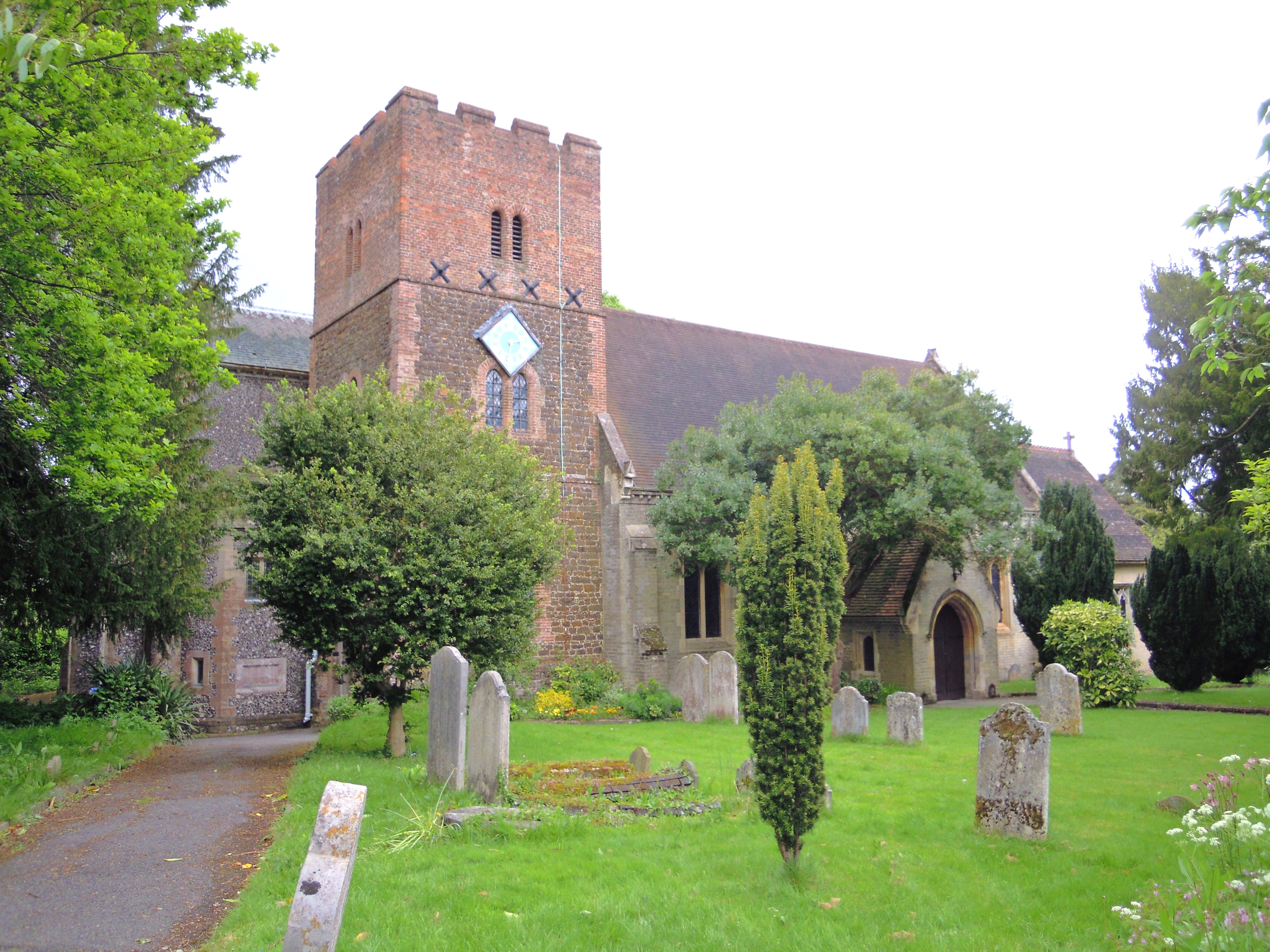
Church of St Michael the Archangel

The Church of St Michael the Archangel is the parish church for the town and dates to the 12th century with later additions. There was almost certainly an earlier church on the site. Cistercian monks from the nearby Waverley Abbey established granges or farms on their outlying estates, including one at Aldershot by 1175 for sheep grazing. We do not know when monks from the Abbey first came to Aldershot but the first documentary evidence is from 1287 when the Crondall Rental records that at 'Alreshate the Monks of Waverlye hold 31 acres of encroachment'. This area ran from the church of St Michael's down to the area around the present Brickfields Country Park while the grange itself was near the church. John Norden's map of Hampshire, published in the 1607 edition of William Camden's Britannia, indicates that Aldershot was a market town.

The area was a vast stretch of sparsely populated common land, considered unsuitable for most forms of agriculture. Aldershot, Crondall, Farnborough, and Yateley were all part of the manor of Crondall in the north-east corner of Hampshire. Crondall manor is mentioned in the Domesday Survey in 1086. It was probably Scandinavian in origin, judging by the ruling family's practice of granting sole inheritance to the eldest child regardless of sex, rather than to the eldest son.

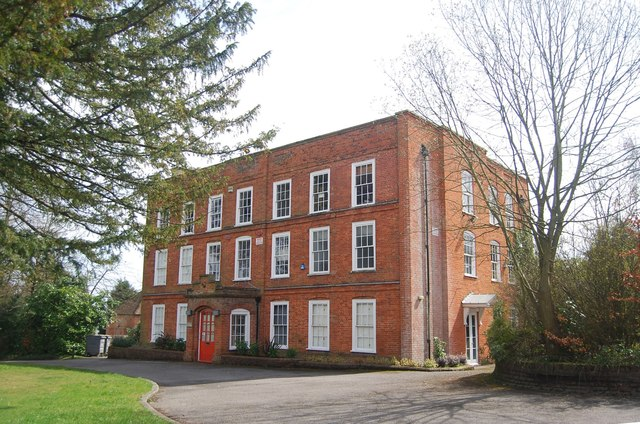
Aldershot Manor, 2013

The first recorded mention of the manor of Aldershot is in 1573 in the will of Sir John White of Aldershot (c1512–1573), alderman of London who was knighted when he became Lord Mayor of London (1563-4). He left Aldershot Manor to his son Sir Robert White of Aldershot (died 1599). He, in turn, left the manor to be divided between his two daughters, Ellen the wife of Sir Richard Tichborne and Mary, the wife of Sir Walter Tichborne, brother of Richard. The 18th-century jurist Charles Viner lived in the town and printed his A General Abridgment of Law and Equity on a press in his home. In the 18th century, the stretch of the London to Winchester turnpike that passed through Aldershot between Bagshot and Farnham (now known as the Farnborough Road) was the scene of highway robberies. At one time it had "almost as bad a reputation as Hounslow Heath". Dick Turpin is said to have operated in the area having his headquarters nearby in Farnborough, and there were sightings of Spring-heeled Jack.

=== Growth in the Victorian era ===
In 1854, at the time of the Crimean War, Aldershot Garrison was established as the first permanent training camp for the British Army. This led to a rapid expansion of Aldershot's population, going from 875 in 1851 to in excess of 16,000 by 1861 (including about 9,000 from the military). Mrs Louisa Daniell arrived in the town at this time and set up her Soldiers' Home and Institute to cater for the spiritual needs of the soldiers and their families. During this period Holy Trinity church, the Presbyterian church, the Wesleyan church and Rotunda chapel were built in the town centre to cater for the spiritual needs of the increasing numbers of troops in the nearby camp and the growing civilian town. In August 1856, on her return from the Crimean War and "wishing to be with her sons in the Army", Mary Seacole with her business partner Thomas Day is said to have arrived in Aldershot where they attempted to open a canteen. In her autobiography, Seacole wrote: 'We set to bravely at Aldershott to retrieve our fallen fortunes, and stem off the ruin originated in the Crimea, but all in vain...'. The venture is believed to have failed through lack of funds and the two being declared bankrupt.

=== Aldershot Military Tattoo ===
The Aldershot Military Tattoo was an annual event dating back to 1894. In the 1920s and 1930s, the Aldershot Command Searchlight Tattoo held at the Rushmoor Arena presented displays from all branches of the services, including performances lit by flame torches. At one time the performances attracted crowds of up to 500,000 people. The Tattoo was organised to raise money for military charities. By the end of the 1930s, the event was raising around £40,000 annually. The Tattoo's modern format, the Army Show, was cancelled in 2010 by the Ministry of Defence due to budget cuts. It was briefly revived the following year and attracted 20,000 visitors. In 2012, it was styled as the Aldershot Garrison Show, a smaller free event held on Armed Forces Day.

The Army Show was replaced in 2013 with a general Military Festival. Events were held across the town, including an art exhibition, live music, sports events and film screenings.

=== During the World Wars ===
In 1914, Aldershot had the largest army camp in the country, with 20% of the British Army being based in and around the town. Aldershot was home for two Infantry Divisions and a Cavalry Brigade in addition to large numbers of artillery, engineers, service corps and medical services. At the start of World War I, the units based at Aldershot became the 1st Corps of the British Expeditionary Force, and soon tens of thousands of new recruits came to the large training centre in the Camp. This had a great effect on the civilian town as there was a great shortage of accommodation for the troops and many were billeted in local houses and schools. Aldershot played a vital role in the formation of Kitchener's Army, providing the core of the Army from 1914 onwards as well as treating the wounded brought back from the trenches in France and Flanders. The Cambridge Military Hospital was the first base hospital to receive casualties directly from the Western Front and it was here that plastic surgery was first performed in the British Empire by Captain Gillies (later Sir Harold Gillies).

From 1939 to 1945 during World War II, about 330,000 Canadian troops of the 1st, 2nd and 3rd Canadian Infantry Brigades passed through Aldershot for training before being deployed for the defence of the United Kingdom while much of the British Army was overseas. Additional units of the Canadian Army followed later creating the largest force of British Commonwealth troops ever to be stationed in the UK at one time. The Aldershot riot of July 1945 caused considerable damage to the town centre when disgruntled Canadian troops tired of waiting to be repatriated rioted in the streets for two evenings. In a gesture of forgiveness and goodwill, the Freedom of the Borough of Aldershot was conferred on the Canadian Army on 26 September 1945 in a ceremony held at the town's recreation ground. In the following year Aldershot's military prison the 'Glasshouse' was burned down in prison riots.

=== Post War ===
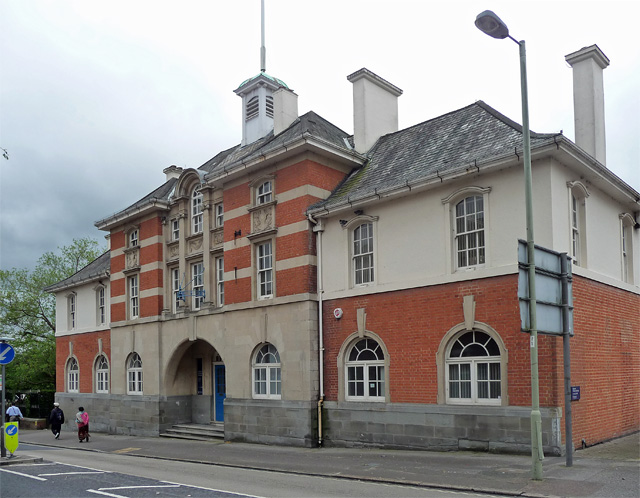
Aldershot Town Hall

A substantial rebuilding of the barracks was carried out between 1961 and 1969 by the architecture and engineering firm Building Design Partnership. The work was sped up under government pressure, and various new building technologies were employed with mixed success.

In 1974, Aldershot borough, which had been based at Aldershot Town Hall, merged with Farnborough urban district to form the Borough of Rushmoor under the provisions of the Local Government Act 1972.

After a 2009 campaign, the British Government allowed veteran Gurkha soldiers who had served for more than four years, and their families, to settle in the UK. The rise in the Nepalese population led Gerald Howarth, Conservative Member of Parliament for Aldershot, to request government assistance in expanding local public services to meet the needs of the growing population.

=== 1972 bombing ===
On 22 February 1972, Aldershot experienced the first in a series of mainland IRA attacks. Seven people, six of whom were civilian support staff, including five catering staff and a gardener were killed in a car bomb attack on the 16th Parachute Brigade headquarters mess. A further 19 people were injured. The bombing was claimed by the Official IRA as revenge for the Bloody Sunday massacre. The only army officer killed was Captain Gerry Weston, a Catholic British Army chaplain. An area to be developed into a memorial garden was used to mark the 40th anniversary of the bombing in 2012.

== Aldershot Military Town ==
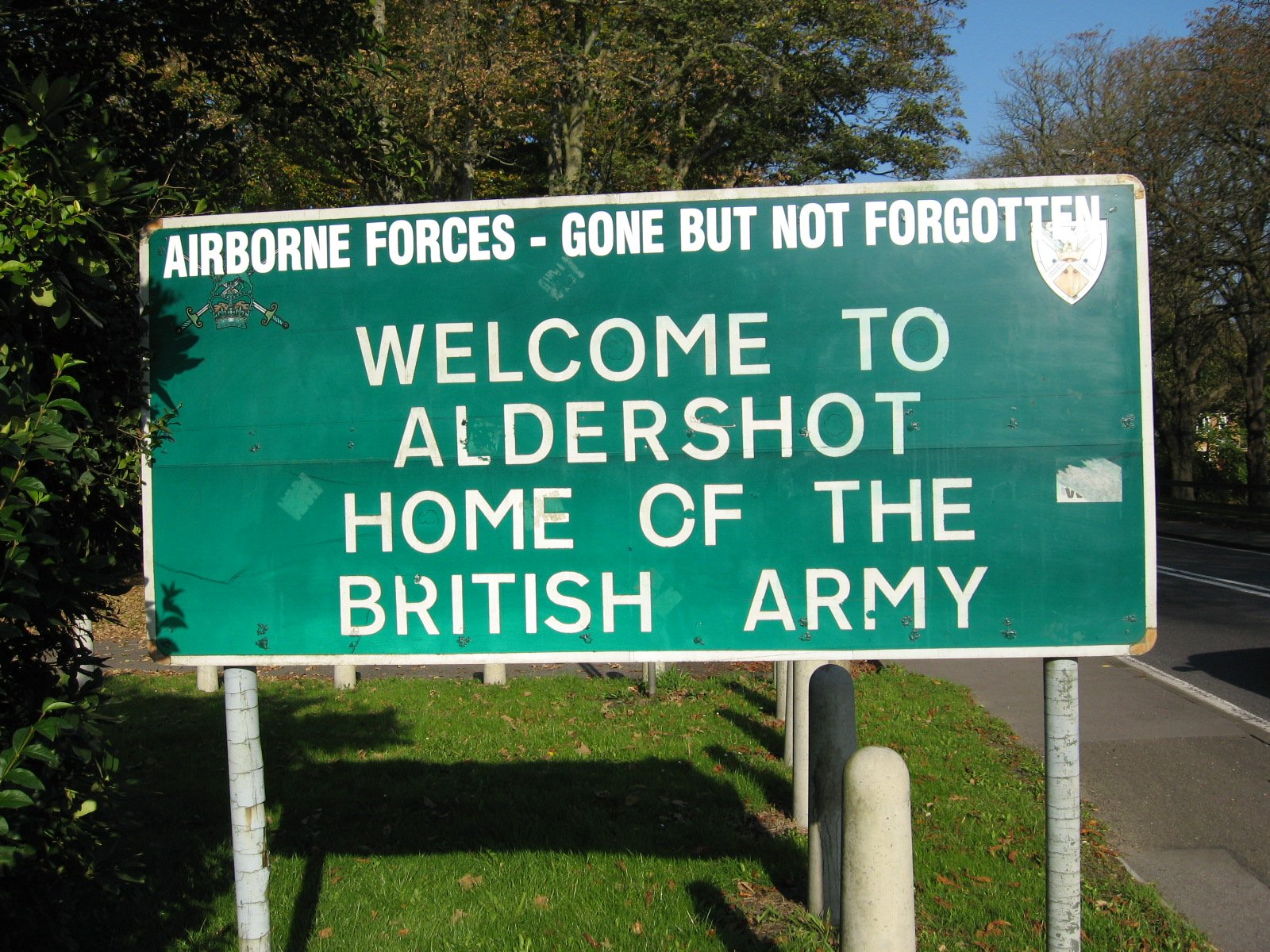
Sign for Aldershot Military Town

Aldershot Military Town is located between Aldershot and North Camp near Farnborough. It is a garrison town that serves as the location for the military presence in the area. It houses Aldershot Garrison's married quarters, barracks, Army playing fields and other sporting facilities. The military town includes some local landmarks, such as the Aldershot Observatory, Aldershot Military Cemetery, the Union Building, the Royal Garrison Church and other churches. Until 1993, the town served as headquarters for the Royal Corps of Transport and the Army Catering Corps, until they were merged into the Royal Logistic Corps and moved to Princess Royal Barracks, Deepcut.

Queen Victoria and Prince Albert showed a keen interest in the establishment and development of Aldershot as a garrison town in the 1850s, at the time of the Crimean War. They had a wooden Royal Pavilion built, where they would often stay when attending reviews of the army. In 1860, Albert established and endowed the Prince Consort's Library, which still exists today. To celebrate Queen Victoria's Diamond Jubilee in 1897, 25,000 British and Colonial soldiers marched from Laffan's Plain near Farnborough, reviewed by Queen Victoria. The Dominion and Colonial soldiers included men from Canada, India, Africa, Australia and New Zealand .

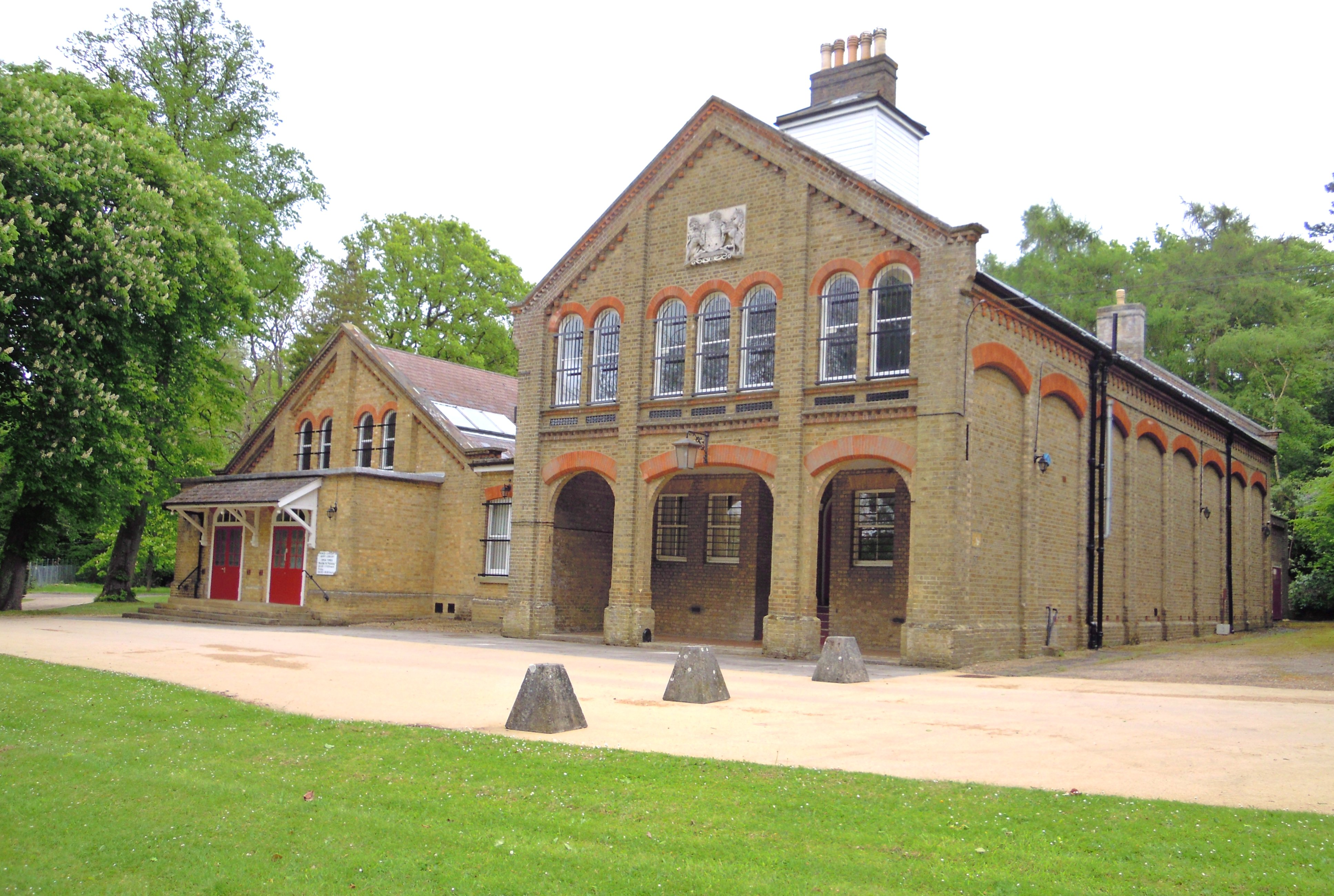
The Prince Consort's Library in the military town

Aldershot Military Town comes under its own military jurisdiction. It was home to the Parachute Regiment from its formation in 1940 until it moved to Colchester Garrison in 2003. Many famous people have been associated with the Military Town, including Charlie Chaplin, who made his first stage appearance in The Canteen theatre aged 5 in 1894, and Winston Churchill, who was based there in the late 19th century during his time in the Army.

The area also houses various military and regimental museums, including the Royal Army Physical Training Corps Museum and the Aldershot Military Museum, housed in a red-brick Victorian barracks. Until December 2007, the Parachute Regiment and Airborne Forces Museum was in Aldershot. It has since moved to the Imperial War Museum Duxford. The RAMC Memorial to the 314 men of the Royal Army Medical Corps who lost their lives in the Boer War of 1899-1902 is located at the top of Gun Hill.

An outline planning application has been agreed for the redevelopment of some of the former Military Town. The Aldershot Urban Extension will bring some 3,850 new homes, two new primary schools, a children's day-care centre, additional secondary school places, community facilities, waste recycling and landscaping to an area of 150 hectares.

In 2013, the MoD announced a £100 million investment to expand Aldershot Garrison and bring 750 more service personnel and their families to settle in Aldershot.

== Landmarks ==
=== Wellington Statue ===
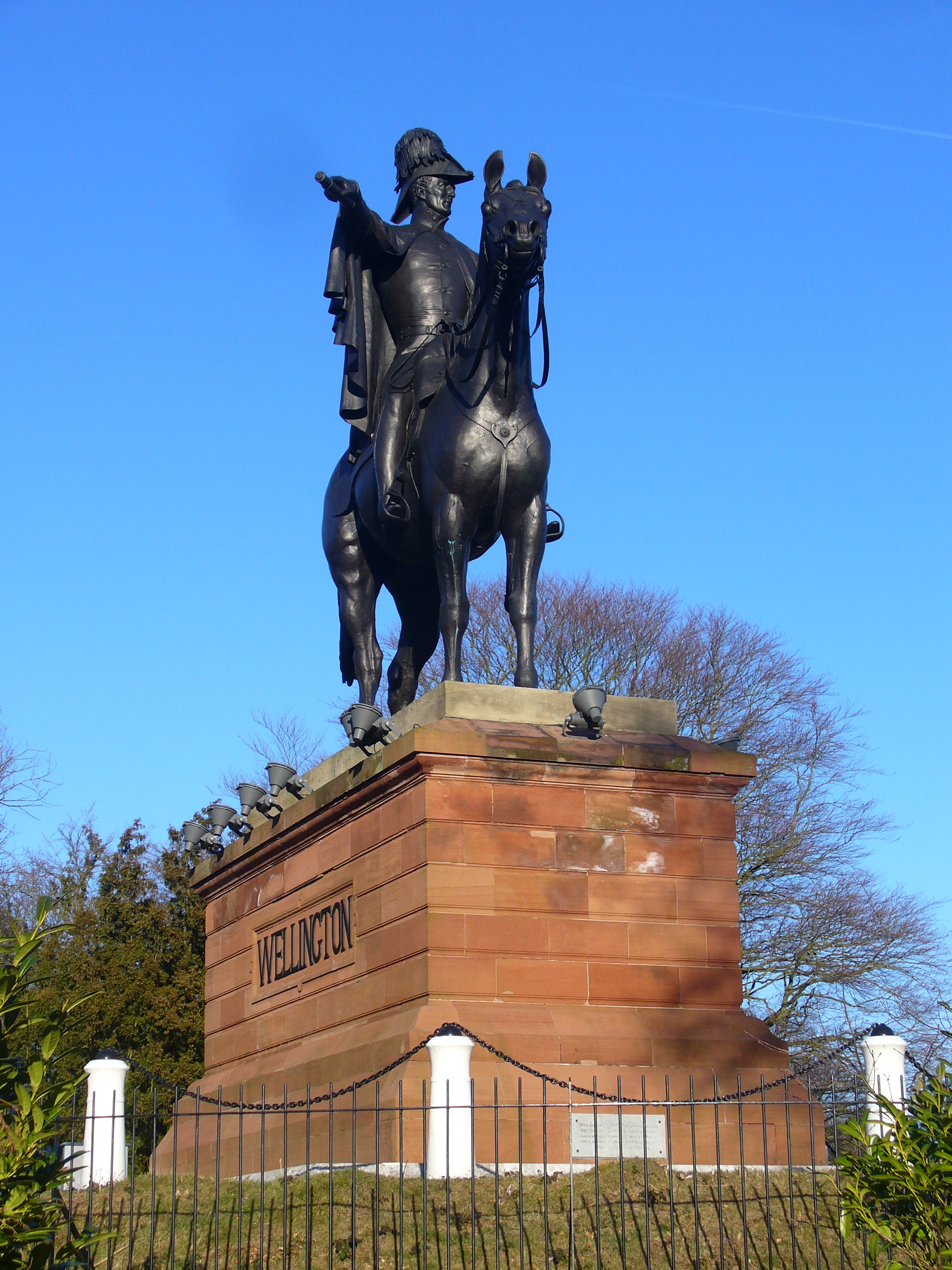
Equestrian statue of the Duke of Wellington on Round Hill

A statue of the first Duke of Wellington mounted on his horse, Copenhagen, is situated on Round Hill behind the Royal Garrison Church. The statue is 30 ft (9.1 m) high, 26 ft (7.9 m) from nose to tail, over 22 ft (6.7 m) in girth, weighs 40 tons and is intricately detailed including musculature and veins. It was designed and built by Matthew Cotes Wyatt who used recycled bronze from cannons that were captured at the Battle of Waterloo. It took thirty men over three years to finish the project.

Originally, in 1846, the statue was erected at Hyde Park Corner, London on the Wellington Arch. However, Decimus Burton, architect of the arch, had tried to veto this plan for his preferred "figure in a four horse chariot". Many agreed with Decimus Burton that the statue looked ridiculous since it was out of proportion. It was nicknamed "The Archduke" and was a popular topic in the satirical magazine Punch.

Queen Victoria claimed that the statue ruined the view of the skyline from Buckingham Palace, and she privately proposed that the statue be moved. The Duke, who had only sat for the sculptor on two or three occasions, suddenly became very attached to the statue and would not consider its removal from its arch.

In 1885, the Prince of Wales handed over the monument to Lieutenant General Anderson, the commander of the Aldershot Garrison.

=== Aldershot Observatory ===
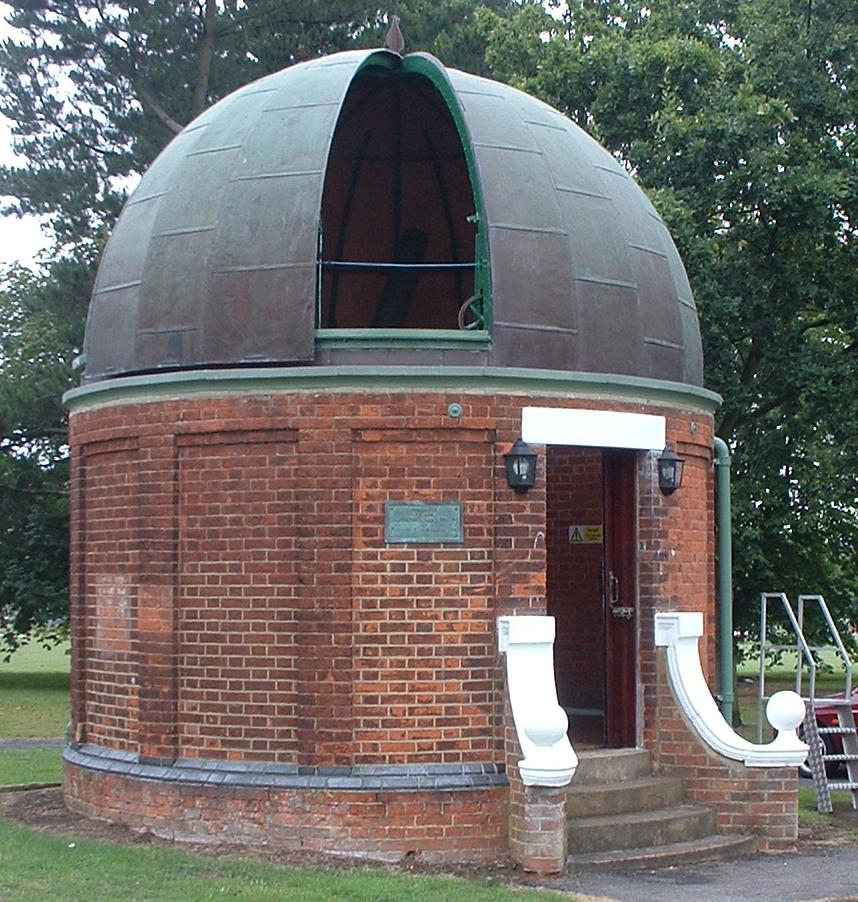
Aldershot Observatory

The observatory is a circular red-brick building with a domed roof and it stands on Queen's Avenue. Inside is a telescope, 8-inch refractor, mounted on a German-type equatorial mount with a clockwork drive. The telescope and observatory building were a gift from aviation pioneer Patrick Young Alexander to the British Army, a fact which is recorded by a plaque near the observatory door. It reads: "Presented to the Aldershot Army Corps by Patrick Y Alexander Esq 1906".

=== The Wesleyan Church ===
The former Wesleyan church on Grosvenor Road has a 100-foot tower that can be seen for miles around the town and which is described as "the only significant tower in the town". Opened in 1877, the church served the Methodists of Aldershot for over 100 years and could seat 1,150 people until its closure in 1988. Today, the original complex of church, Soldiers' Home and Hall, has been converted into offices, a dental surgery, gymnasium and homes.

=== Aldershot Buddhist Centre ===
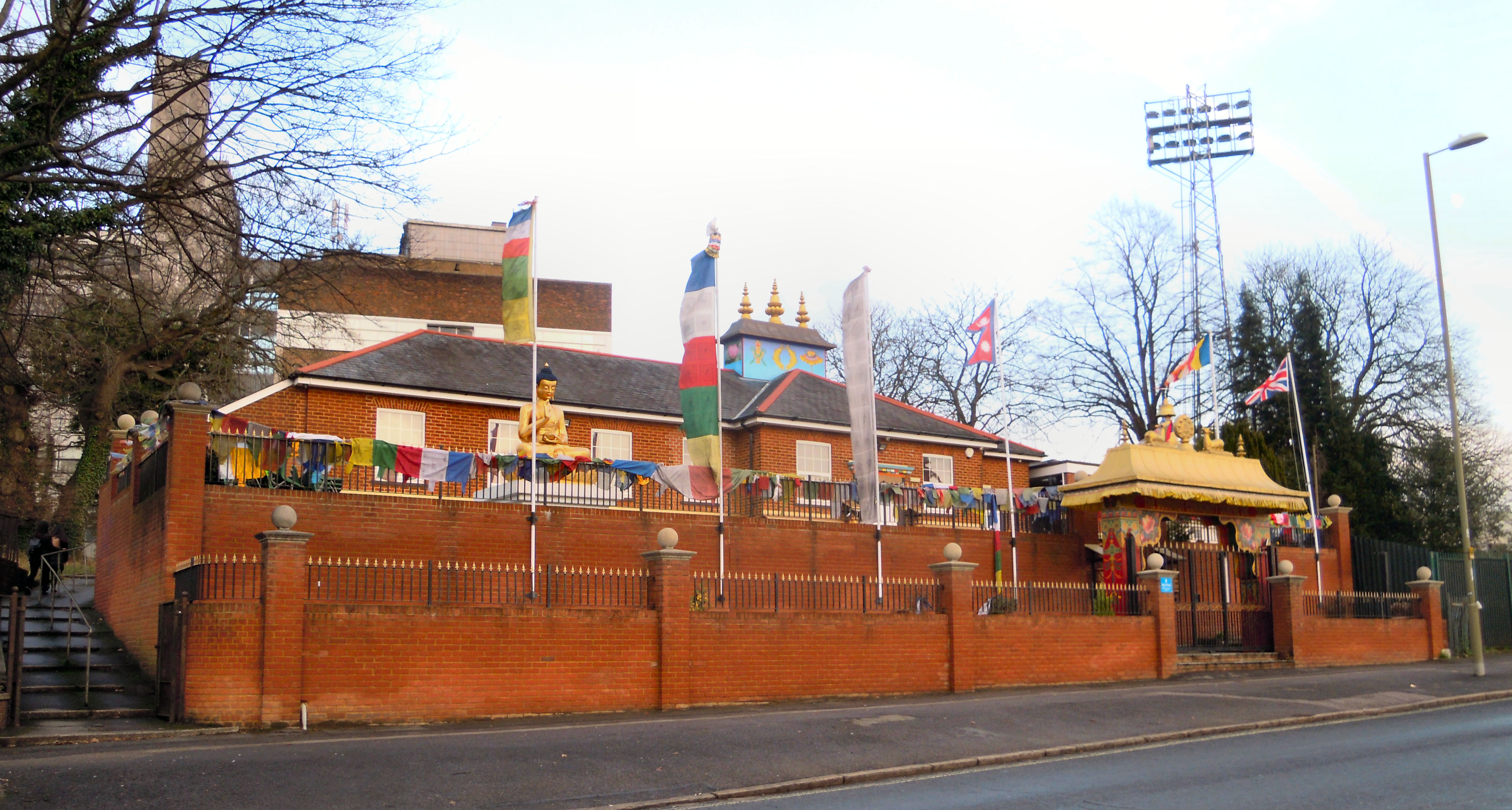
Aldershot Buddhist Centre in 2018

Aldershot Buddhist Centre is a Buddhist temple and community centre catering for the Buddhists of Aldershot and surrounding area, which is billed as the United Kingdom's first Buddhist community centre. With the influx of large numbers of Nepalis into the area in recent years giving Rushmoor the largest Buddhist community in the United Kingdom, a temple and community centre to cater for their spiritual and secular needs was required. The centre was formally opened on the High Street by the 14th Dalai Lama in June 2015.

=== Union Building ===
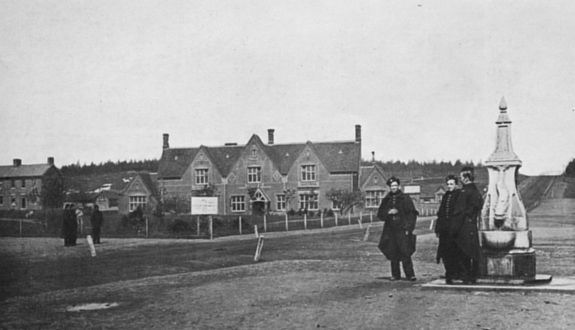
The Union Building in 1870

When a small party of NCOs and men of the Royal Engineers arrived in November 1853 in the area that is today Princes Gardens, they were the first soldiers to arrive in Aldershot. At this time, the area was heathland with the only building in sight being the Union Poor House, built in 1629 as a sub-manor for the Tichborne family and later used as the local workhouse and a school. It was one of five permanent local buildings purchased by the War Department in 1854 as part of the development of the new Aldershot Camp, and was used by the Army from 1854 to 1879 as No 2 Station Hospital. In later years, it saw a variety of uses before being redeveloped as flats.

== Transport ==
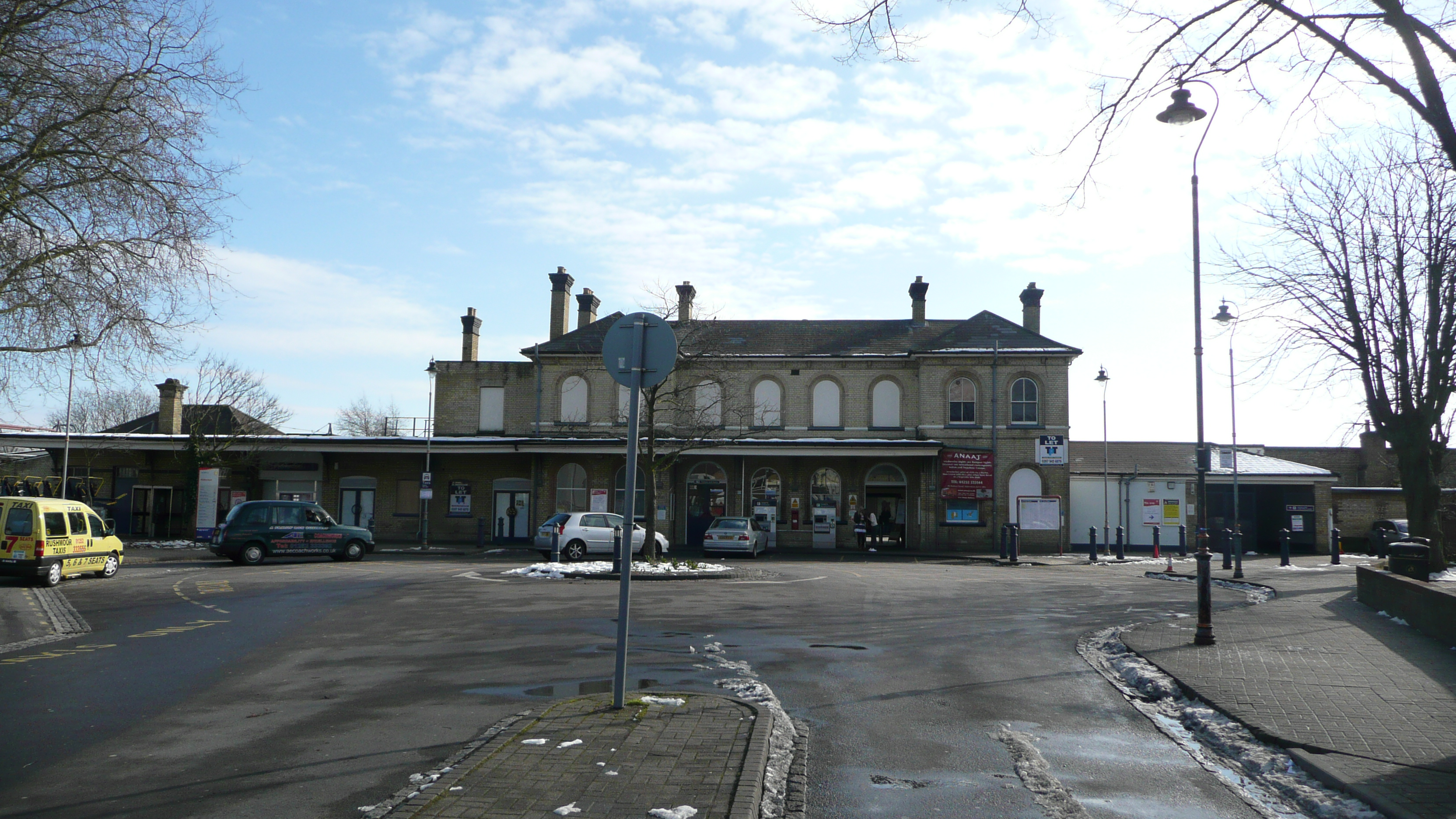
The exterior of the station in February 2009

Aldershot railway station is a stop on the Alton Line; South Western Railway runs services between London Waterloo, Alton, Guildford and Ascot.

Aldershot is close to several major roads, including the M3 and the A3. Its nearest dual-carriageway roads are the A31 to the south, which heads east towards Guildford and the A3; to the east, the A331 which heads north towards Farnborough and the M3.

Bus services from Aldershot are provided by Stagecoach South. Since the closure of Aldershot bus station in May 2023, passengers now access services at various on-street stops around the town centre. National Express coach services operate between London Victoria and Portsmouth twice a day.

Farnborough Airport is located 5 miles (8.0 km) away, with Heathrow 29 miles (47 km) and Gatwick 43 miles (69 km) away.

== Education ==
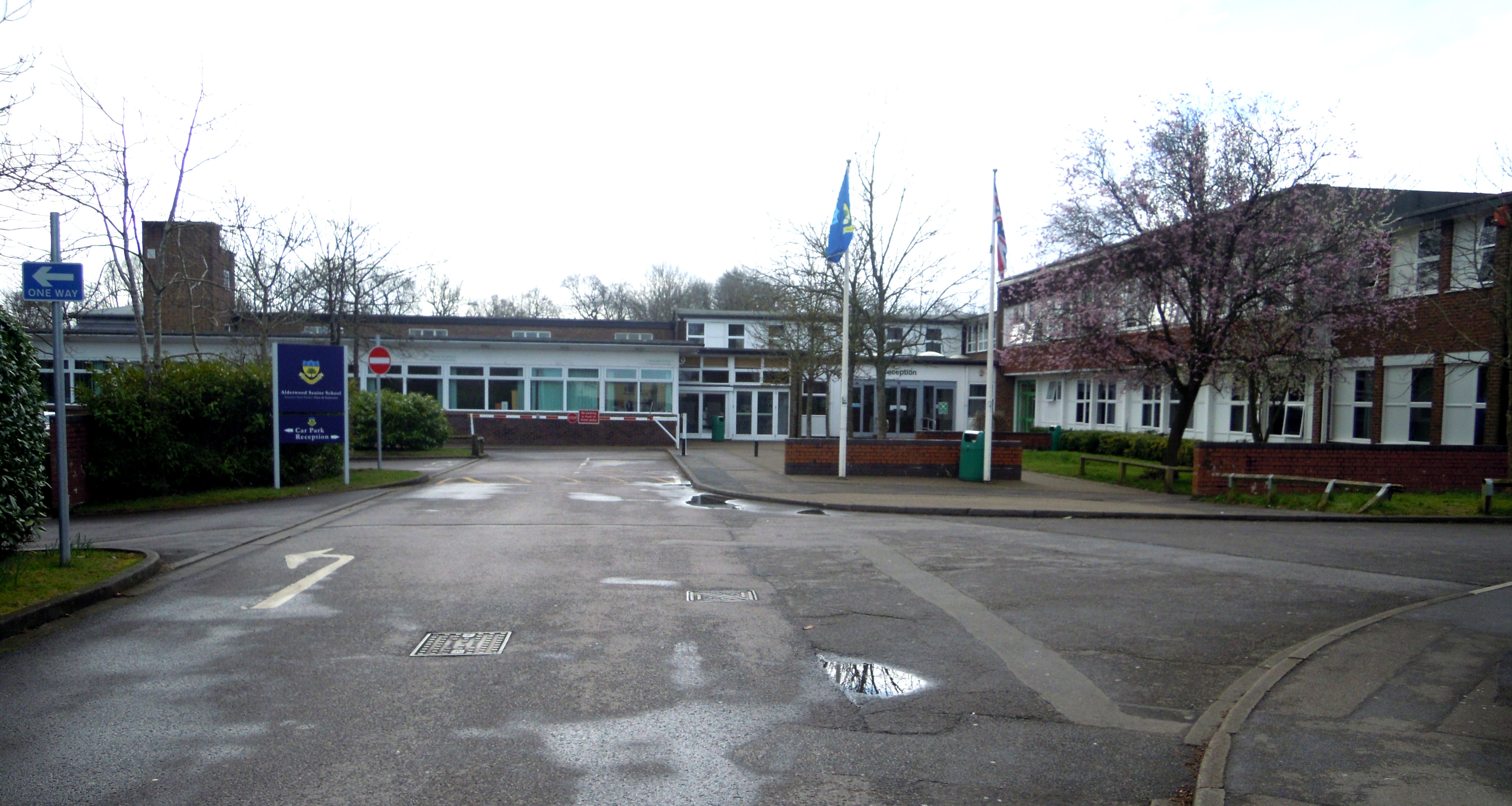
Alderwood School is the town's only secondary school

There are various schools in Aldershot. These will be joined by two new primary schools being built as part of the Aldershot Urban extension development of 3,850 houses. This development will also be served by a further 675 secondary school places being created at the Alderwood and Wavell schools.

Primary schools include Park Primary and St Michael's (C of E). The infant schools are Talavera, Wellington Primary and Bell Vue Infant School. Junior schools include: Newport County, Talavera, Wellington Secondary and St Joseph's Primary (Catholic).

Aldershot has only one secondary school, Alderwood School (formerly Heron Wood School and The Connaught School), though Ash Manor School, Farnham Heath End School, All Hallows Catholic School and The Wavell School are all local. In the town's West End can be found Rowhill School, a special school for students of secondary age unable to attend mainstream schooling for a variety of reasons. There are also two private schools, Salesian College and Farnborough Hill School in nearby Farnborough.

== Local newspapers ==
The local press is the Aldershot News & Mail, a Surrey Advertiser Group broadsheet. At the end of November 2017, the Surrey-Hants Star Courier, a free tabloid, ceased publication.

== Leisure and recreation ==
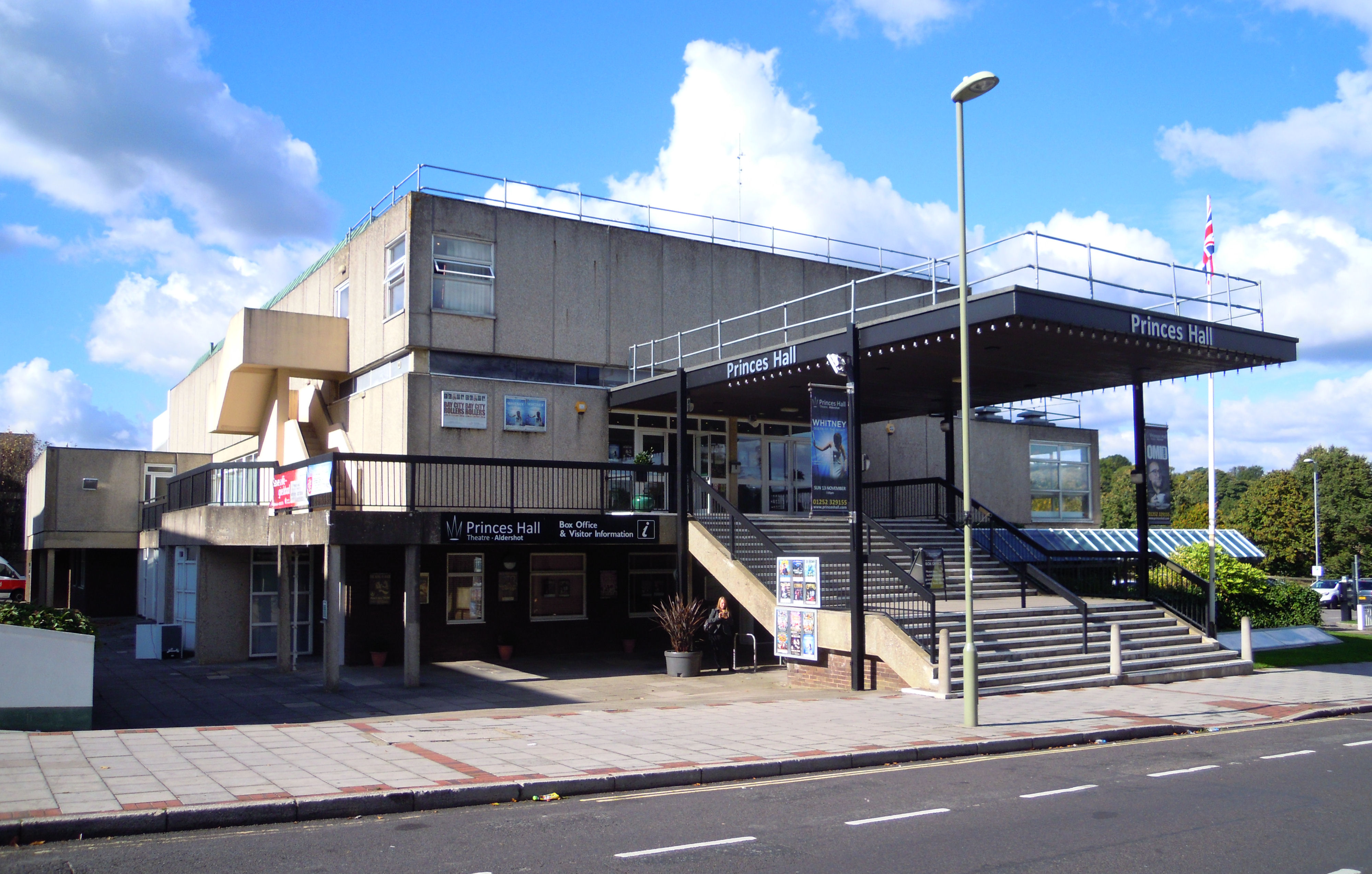
The Princes Hall is Aldershot's main entertainment venue

Following the demolition of the Theatre Royal and Hippodrome theatres in 1959 and 1961, the local council opened its own Princes Hall in 1973 as an entertainment venue. Another entertainment venue and arts centre is the West End Centre on Queens Road which is popular for small-scale theatre, music and comedy.

=== Music and dance ===
==== The Beatles in Aldershot ====
Poster for the appearance of the Beatles at Aldershot in 1961

Sam Leach, their then agent who wanted to become their manager, attempted to introduce the Beatles to London agents by promoting shows at The Palais Ballroom, on the corner of Perowne Street and Queens Road in Aldershot on 9 December 1961. Leach wanted to organise a 'battle of the bands' between the Beatles and Ivor Jay and the Jaywalkers from London. The show was not advertised properly and, as a result, only 18 people attended. The local newspaper, The Aldershot News, failed to publish Leach's advertisement for the show. In addition, Ivor Jay and the Jaywalkers failed to appear. However, the band and friends had their own fun after the show, drinking ale, playing football with bingo balls and dancing the foxtrot. The noise became so loud that a neighbour called the police who shut the event down. When interviewed in 1983 about the Aldershot gig, Paul McCartney described it as "the night we couldn't get arrested, but it wasn't for the lack of trying". Weeks after this Brian Epstein became the group's manager.

==== Hardcore ====
The Palace (previously The Palace Cinema, The Rhythm Station, Cheeks, Vox), influenced the rapid growth of the hardcore scene from 1992 to 1995. At the height of the club's popularity, a teenager's death from a suspected overdose of ecstasy was the catalyst that saw dance music leaving the club and had a negative impact on the hardcore dance scene in the Aldershot area.

=== Shopping ===
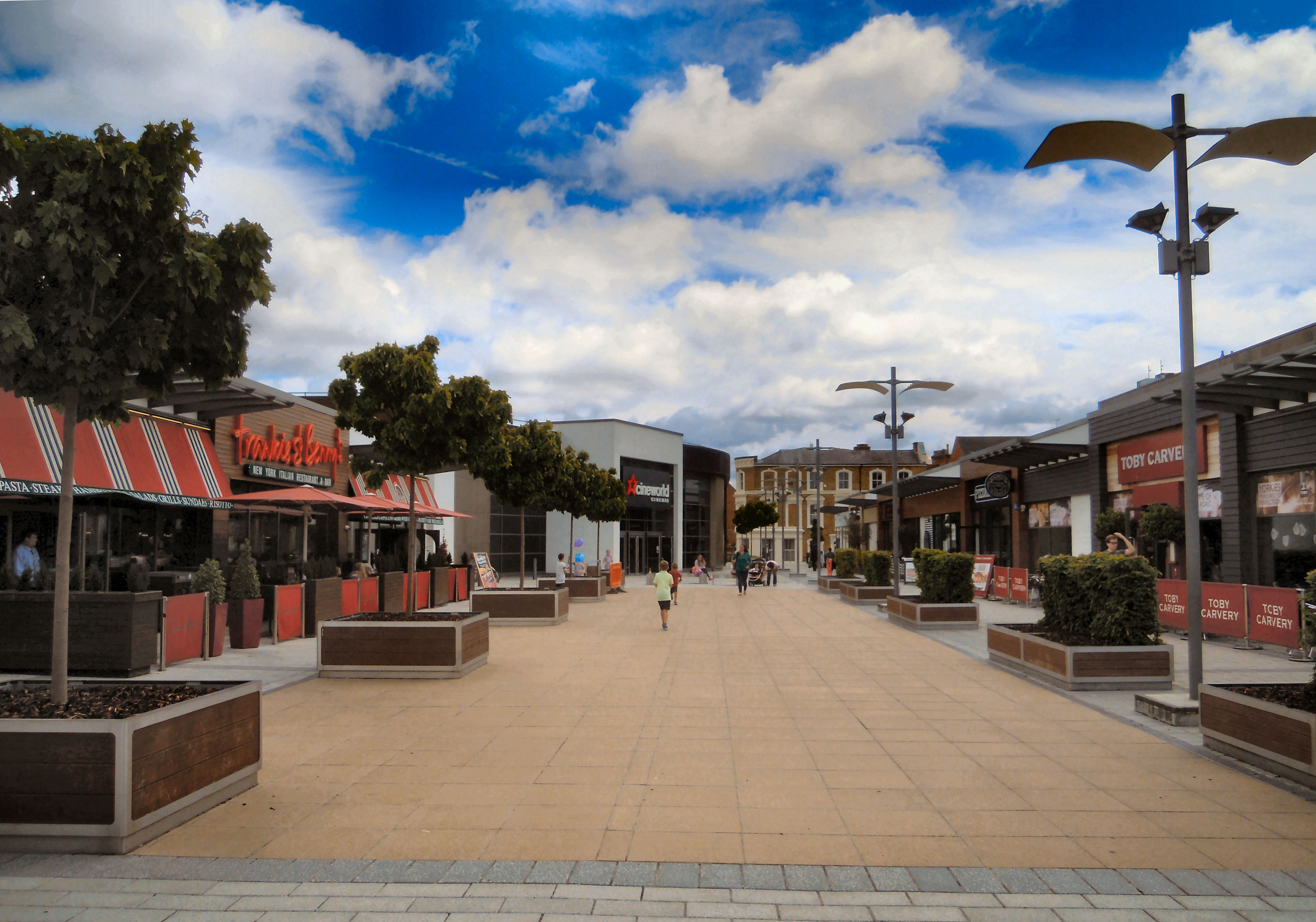
West Gate Leisure Park

Union Street and Wellington Street at the centre of the town's shopping district were pedestrianised in the 1970s when the Wellington Centre, a covered shopping centre, was built over the site of the town's former open-air market. As of 2020, Union Street East is undergoing regeneration; the project has been referred to as Union Yard.

During the 1980s and 1990s, the Victorian shopping arcade and various other period buildings in Wellington Street were demolished to allow for the building of an extension to the Wellington Centre known as The Galleries. The Galleries has remained almost vacant for many years now and is currently under consideration for proposed redevelopment into a mixed use retail and residential scheme, with potential commercial leisure space. In 2003, a health check of the town centre concluded that, "Aldershot is experiencing promising signs of revitalisation, particularly in the shopping core". This revitalisation failed to materialise, with prominent traders such as Marks and Spencer leaving the town centre.

In 2005, Rushmoor Borough Council documented the percentage of vacant shops at 10%, 8% and 7% respectively for Union Street, the Wellington Centre and Wellington Street.

The Westgate Leisure Park, which opened in 2012–2013 and which fronts onto Barrack Road, includes a Cineworld cinema, supermarkets and several chain restaurants.

== Parks and open spaces ==
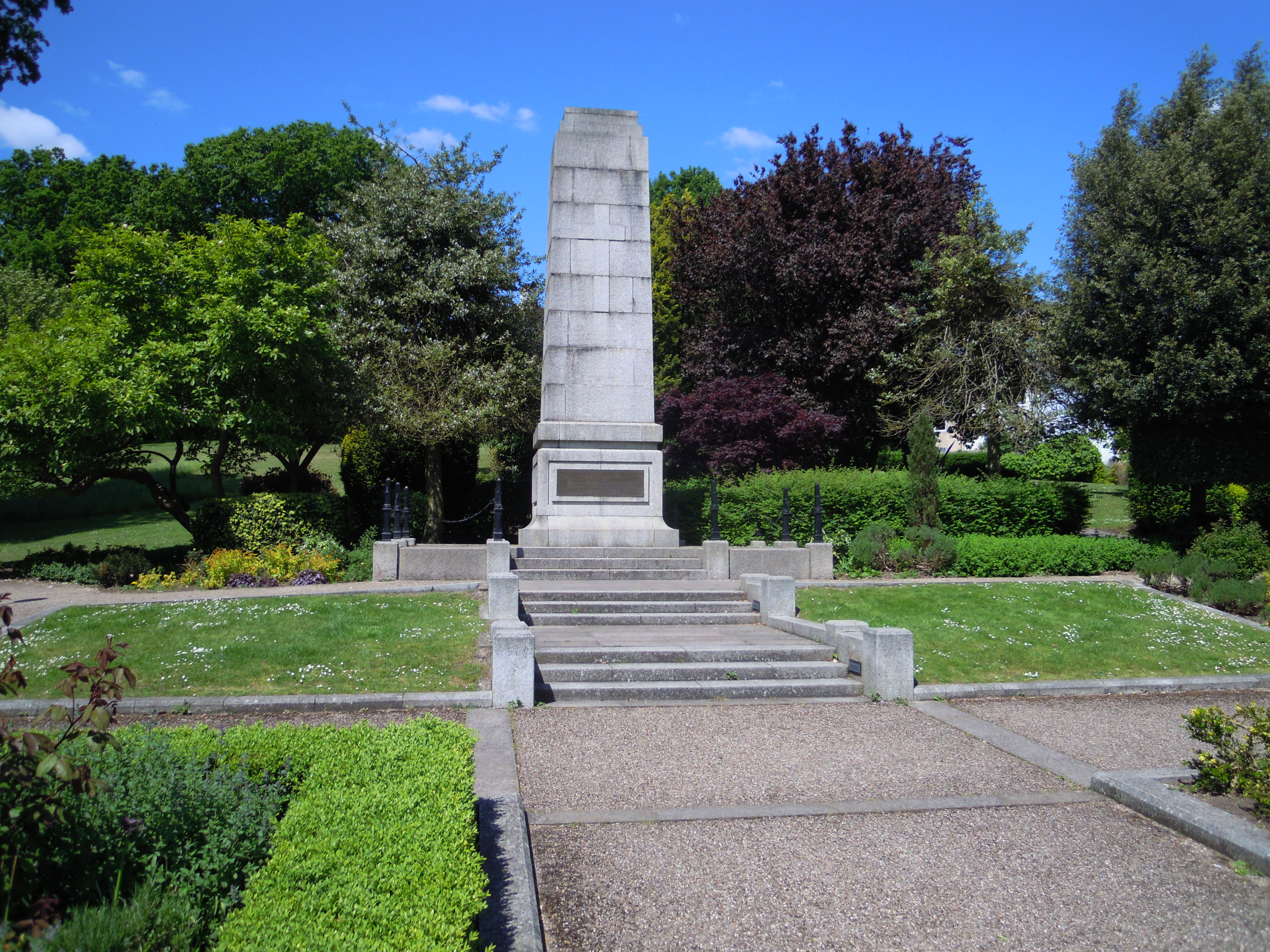
The Cenotaph in Municipal Gardens, Aldershot

Aldershot has many parks, playgrounds and open spaces for sport, play and leisure, including Aldershot Park, Brickfields Country Park, the Municipal Gardens, Manor Park and the Princes Gardens, the latter three a short walk from the town centre.

The legacy of the Army has meant that the land for leisure use, as well as protected areas for flora and fauna, has been preserved over many years. On the Surrey border can be found Rowhill Nature Reserve, which is popular with nature-lovers, dog owners, walkers and joggers.

== Sport ==
Sports facilities include the Rushmoor Gymnastics Academy, Aldershot Tennis Centre, Aldershot Bowling, Aldershot Pools and Lido, Aldershot Garrison Sports Centre, Alderwood Leisure Centre (formerly Connaught Leisure Centre) and Alpine Snow Sports (Dry Ski Centre). Formerly the town also hosted short circuit motor racing including speedway and stock car racing. Greyhound racing took place at Aldershot Stadium, and point-to-point racing at Tweseldown. The running club AFD has produced some top runners. Aldershot Park hosts a number of sports facilities and organisations.

=== Athletics ===
Aldershot is home to one of the most successful athletics clubs in British and European history, Aldershot, Farnham & District A.C.. The club has produced many Olympians including Roger Hackney, Zola Budd, Lily Partridge and Steph Twell and specialises in middle–long distance running. The home of AFD, as it is commonly known, is the Aldershot Military Stadium, Aldershot.

Blackwater Valley Runners are a social running club and organise many local races.

=== Swimming ===
Opened in 1930, Aldershot Lido is a traditional outdoor leisure pool (lido) that contains 1.5 million gallons of water situated on a 10-acre (4.0 ha) site. The original land was a lake that had become overgrown with weeds. It was bought by the Borough Council in 1920 for £21,000 and was the focus of the council's improvement projects for the town. The Lido was the site of the swimming event in the modern pentathlon at the 1948 Summer Olympics. The pool has extensive areas of shallow water for children to play including a large fountain at the centre. It also has a diving area and water slides. There is an adjoining 25 m indoor pool that allows all year round swimming.

=== Football ===
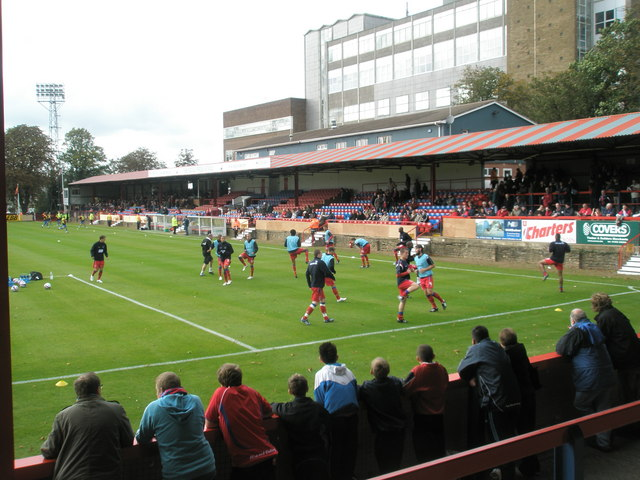
Aldershot Town warming up at the Recreation Ground

The local professional football team is Aldershot Town who compete in the National League. Before 1992 the local club was Aldershot, which folded on 25 March 1992, while playing in the Football League Fourth Division. The current club was formed shortly afterwards and achieved five promotions in its first 16 seasons to return to the Football League in 2008. The previous Aldershot club's biggest success arguably came in 1987, just five years before closure, when they became the first team to win the Football League Fourth Division promotion play-offs, at the expense of a far bigger club – Wolverhampton Wanderers.

Since 1927, the main football ground in the town, and home of both teams, is the Recreation Ground, also known as The Rec. It has a capacity for 7,100, of which 2,000 can be seated.

A number of successful current and former footballers are from the Aldershot area, including Johnny Berry, who was born in the town in 1926. He played for Birmingham City and Manchester United before his playing career was ended by injuries sustained in the Munich air disaster on 6 February 1958. He had won three league title medals with Manchester United. He later returned to Aldershot and continued to live locally until he died in September 1994, at the age of 68.

Other footballers born in Aldershot include Craig Maskell (a striker for clubs including Southampton, Swindon Town and Reading) during the 1980s and 1990s, and Bruce Rioch (who played for clubs including Aston Villa and Derby County before managing clubs including Middlesbrough and Arsenal).

On 25 October 2011, Aldershot Town played Manchester United at the Recreation Ground in the League Cup 4th round losing 3–0, their most successful run to-date in the Carling Cup.

=== Cricket ===
Aldershot Cricket Club is based in Aldershot Park in the town and plays in the Thames Valley Cricket League. Army cricket matches have been played at the Officers Club Services Ground, which has also played host to home matches for Hampshire County Cricket Club. Many of these matches held first-class status.

=== Hockey ===
Aldershot Cricket Club shares facilities with the successful Aldershot & Farnham Hockey Club which, in 2022, were looking for a more permanent base.

=== Rugby union ===
Formerly known as Fleet RUFC, the club started in 1991 as a pub side. The club was renamed Aldershot and Fleet RUFC (A&F or the Stags) after their move in 2003 from Farnborough to their current home, Aldershot Park. Aldershot & Fleet were successful in winning the RFU "Seal of Approval" Club of the Year 2008 for the southern region. They now play in the Hampshire 2 league.

=== Greyhound racing ===
Greyhound racing took place regularly at the now closed Aldershot Stadium in Tongham during the 1950s.

=== Stock car racing ===
Aldershot Stadium was located in Oxenden Road, Tongham, and staged Stock Car racing for the first time on 30 October 1954.

The racing took place initially on a loose shale track inside the greyhound track; after Motorcycle speedway racing at the venue ceased, the shale track was replaced with a hard tarmaced surface. The track was home to the Aldershot Knights for National League team racing in 1966 and again in 1971 and 1972.

The final meeting at Oxenden Road took place on 21 November 1992. Immediately after this date, the site was cleared for construction of the A331 Blackwater Valley Road, which forms a by-pass for Aldershot and Farnborough.

=== Speedway ===
In 1929, eight meetings were held at the 25 acres Aldershot Sports Stadium on Boxall's Lane. The first of these was held on Wednesday 3 July 1929. Speedway returned to Aldershot in 1950 at Aldershot Stadium. The Shots featured primarily in the third tier of the sport up to 1960.

=== Olympics ===
Aldershot hosted three of the five events in the modern pentathlon at the 1948 London Olympics. The swimming was held in Aldershot Lido, Maida Gymnasium hosted the fencing and the cross-country equestrian event was held at Tweseldown. All of the Olympic equestrian events, excluding the Prix des Nations, were also held at Aldershot. It was announced on 15 January 2008 that the Aldershot Military Town had been chosen as the official training camp for the British Olympic team ahead of the 2012 Olympic Games in London. However, in April 2010, it was announced that Team GB would be training at Loughborough University.

== Politics ==
Aldershot is divided into the following wards:

=== Rushmoor Borough Council ===
- Rowhill: south-west of the town has one Labour and two Conservative councillors.
- Wellington: west of the town together with the northern half of the town centre, combines the most compact urban parts of the town northern part of the town centre, much of the military town and a very large acreage of unpopulated woodlands, forests and heathland. It has two Labour councillors and one Conservative councillor.
- Manor Park: south of the town and the southern half of the town centre has three Conservative councillors.
- Aldershot Park: south-east of the town has three Labour councillors.
- North Town: north-east of the town has three Labour councillors.
- St Marks: north of the town and parts of Farnborough has three Conservative councillors.

=== Hampshire County Council ===
- Aldershot North: the north-west of the town has one Labour councillor.
- Aldershot South: the south-east of the town has one Conservative councillor.

As of the May 2018 Rushmoor Borough Council elections and the May 2017 Hampshire County Council elections, of the 20 seats on Rushmoor Borough Council and Hampshire County Council covering Aldershot, the Conservatives hold 12 and Labour hold 8.

=== Member of Parliament ===
The town is represented in Parliament through the Aldershot constituency. The current MP is Alex Baker of the Labour party.

== Notable people from Aldershot ==
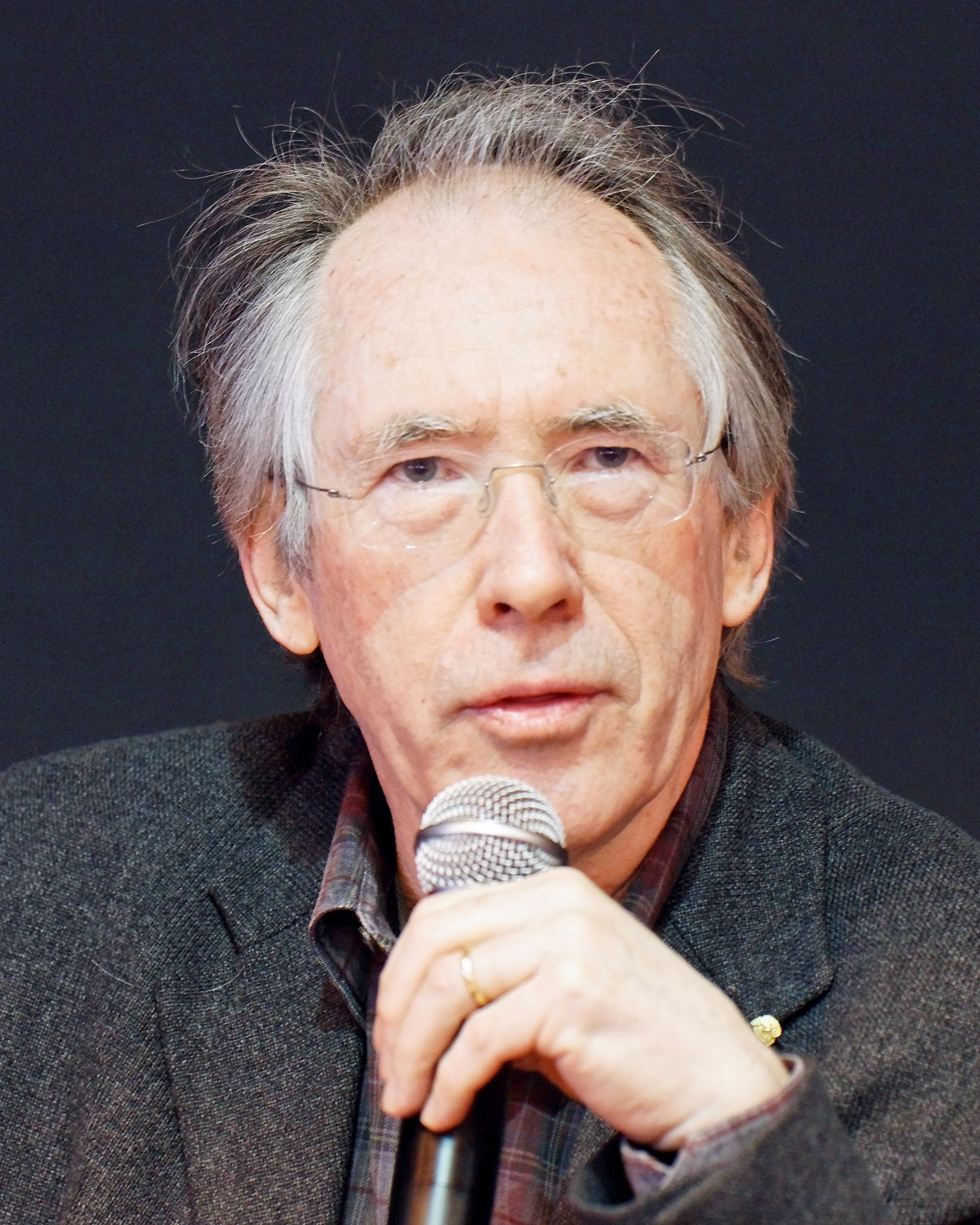
Ian McEwan

- Holly Aird, actress known for her role in Waking The Dead
- John Belling (1866–1933), cytogeneticist was born in Aldershot
- Daniel Middleton (born 1991), who goes by DanTDM, is a YouTuber, gamer and author born in Aldershot.
- Amelle Berrabah, singer, songwriter and former member of the Sugababes
- Johnny Berry, Manchester United footballer and 'Busby Babe'
- Grace Dent, food critic born in 1973 in Aldershot
- Arthur English, actor and comedian, in honour of whom there is now a blue plaque at 22 Lysons Road
- Russell Foster, professor of circadian neuroscience and Nicholas Kurti Senior Fellow at Brasenose College at the University of Oxford
- Joel Freeland, professional basketball player, having played for both the Portland Trail Blazers and CSKA Moscow
- Martin Freeman, actor in The Office, The Hobbit and Sherlock
- David Haig, actor
- Joe Jopling, professional footballer
- John Lucarotti, screenwriter
- Ian McEwan, novelist
- Ben Norris (comedian), stand-up comedian, who has appeared on Mock the Week and Never Mind the Buzzcocks
- Joe Ralls, footballer and former captain of Cardiff City FC
- Alex Reid, mixed martial arts fighter and ex-husband of Katie Price
- Eve Stratford, Playboy Club Bunny, who was the victim of one of Britain's unsolved murders in 1975
- Alfred Toye, Aldershot-born recipient of the Victoria Cross during World War I
- James Wade, professional darts player on the PDC.

== In popular culture ==
In 1894, a five-year old Charlie Chaplin made his first appearance on stage at the Canteen when his mother, a music-hall singer, lost her voice in the middle of a song and was booed offstage. Chaplin was taken on stage by the stage-manager and left to entertain the audience with singing, dancing and imitations, including of his mother.

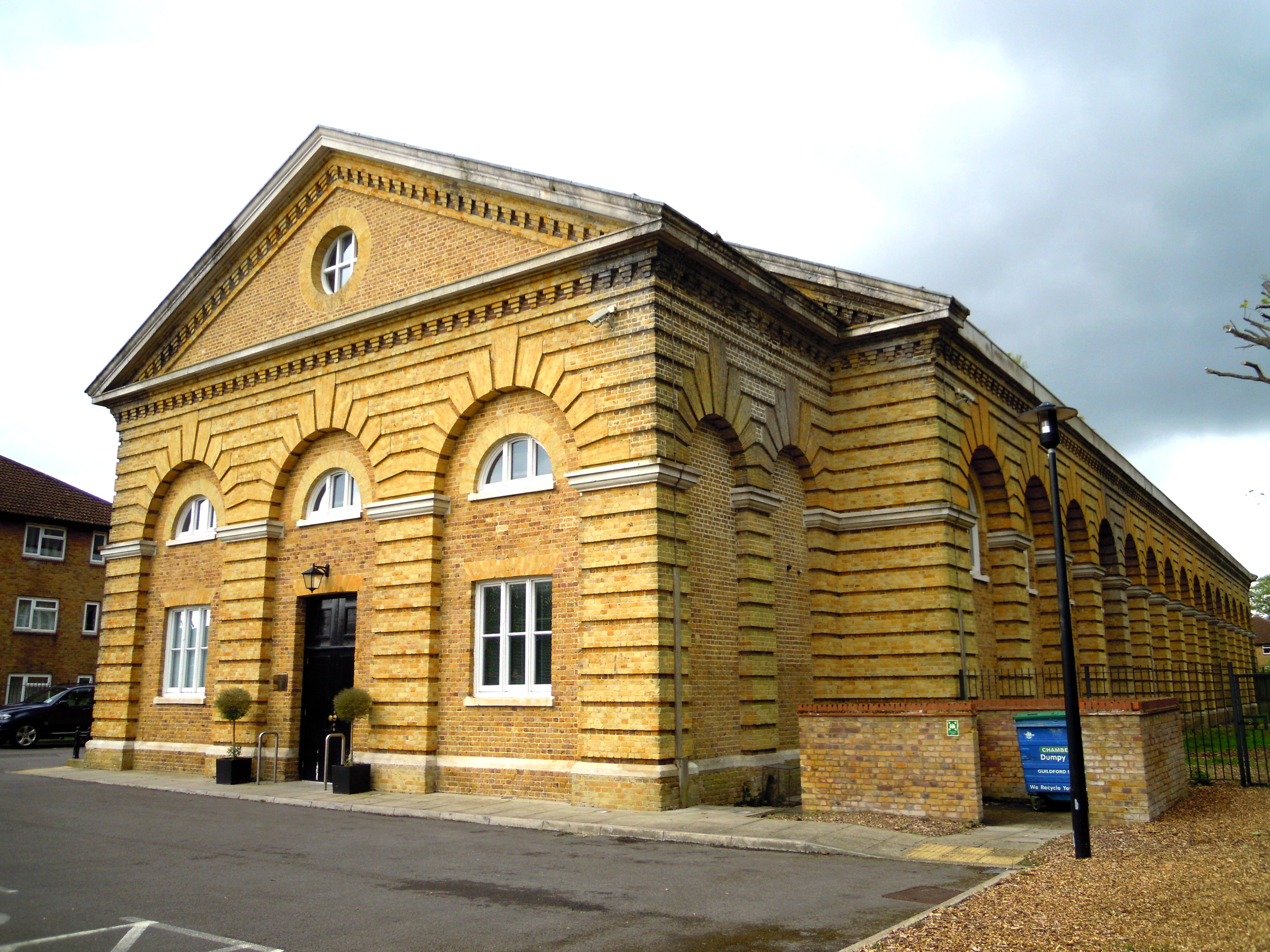
The Cavalry Riding School building at Beaumont Barracks featured in The Charge of the Light Brigade (1968)

The barracks scenes in the 1968 film The Charge of the Light Brigade, starring David Hemmings and Trevor Howard, were filmed at the old West Cavalry Barracks (now largely demolished). The gates of the South Cavalry Barracks stood in as the prison gates for the 1960 film Two-Way Stretch starring Peter Sellers, Wilfrid Hyde-White and Lionel Jeffries. Breakout (1959 film) used the East Cavalry Barracks.

The area was used for location filming of the 1970 Doctor Who episode "The Ambassadors of Death".

Due to its architecture, Bruneval Barracks in Montgomery Lines was chosen as the location for snowy scenes in Kazan, Russia, at the end of the 2009 James Bond film Quantum of Solace. Parts of Aldershot's military training area were also used for the opening sequence in the 2002 James Bond film Die Another Day.

The Montgomery Lines were again used for Brad Pitt's film World War Z based on the novel by Max Brooks.

The HBO series House of the Dragon filmed a number of scenes for the third episode on the Caesar's Camp military training ground on the border of Farnham and Aldershot.

== Twin towns ==
Rushmoor is twinned with:

- Dayton, Ohio, United States (since 2019)
- Gorkha Municipality, Nepal (since 2020)
- Meudon, France (since 1974)
- Oberursel, Germany (since 1989)
- Rzeszów, Poland (since 2019)
- Sulechów, Poland (since 2001)

== See also ==
- List of army barracks around Aldershot
- Aldershot Military Cemetery
- Aldershot Cemetery, the town's civil cemetery
- Aldershot Crematorium
- St Joseph's Church, Aldershot
- Church of St Michael the Archangel
- Holy Trinity Church, Aldershot
- Wesleyan Church, Aldershot
- Royal Army Physical Training Corps Museum
