= Aldershot Park =

Public park in Aldershot, Hampshire, England

Coordinates: 51.234°N 0.743°W

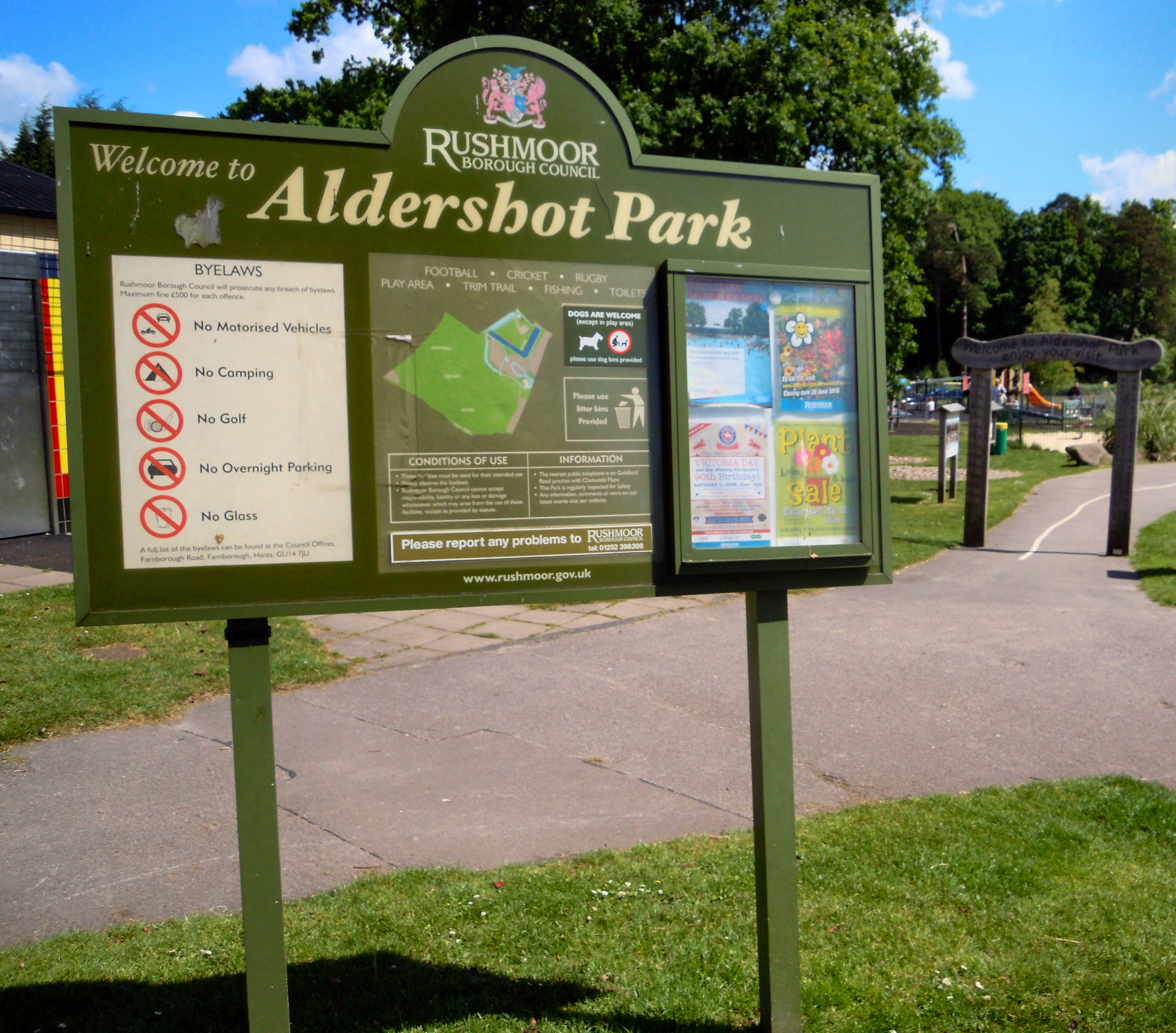
Aldershot Park signage

Aldershot Park is an urban park in the town of Aldershot in Hampshire. The park is located on Guildford Road near Aldershot Cricket Club and the Lido and is owned and maintained by Rushmoor Borough Council.

== History ==
Aldershot Park Mansion in 1962

There is some evidence that the original manor in Aldershot Park dated to the early medieval period. This manor was acquired in the 16th century by Sir John White whose family were originally traders in wool. In 1599 his son Robert White died without male heirs and his estate was left to his two daughters - Ellen, the wife of Sir Richard Tichborne, and Mary, the wife of Walter Tichborne, brother of Richard and so the manor passed to the Tichborne family.

The Tichbornes were the biggest landowners in Aldershot and the brothers Sir Richard and Sir Walter Tichborne were favourites of James I who was godfather to Walter’s son James, born in 1611, and the king travelled to Aldershot for the christening at nearby St Michael's church. James I returned to Aldershot in 1618, 1622 and 1623 when he stayed with the Tichbornes at their mansion in Aldershot Park built in the style of a castle with a moat and large garden. However, by the time of Charles I this was becoming run down. When Charles visited in August 1627 a Spanish Ambassador asked to have an urgent audience. To the embarrassment of the Tichbornes the king replied that the house at Aldershot was unfit for such a meeting and arranged it for the following week at Oatlands Palace near Weybridge. During the Civil War the Tichbornes were Royalists and as a result suffered loss of property and status during the Commonwealth. Although they received some compensation after the restoration of Charles II the family was deep in debt so James Tichborne (great-grandson of Sir Walter) eventually was forced to sell Aldershot Park.

In 1842 the estate was bought by Charles Barron who built Aldershot Park Mansion. He died in 1859. Later the estate was sold to John Back, on whose death it was purchased by Charles D'Oridant, the owner of the Pavilion Hotel at Folkestone. From him it passed by purchase to a Miss Kennedy.

The land of Aldershot Place, as it was later named, was acquired by Aldershot Urban District Council in 1920 and part was used for the building of the Park estate of council housing, and part retained as the public park we have today. Aldershot Park Mansion was demolished in the 1960s to make way for Place Court old people's home.

== Facilities ==
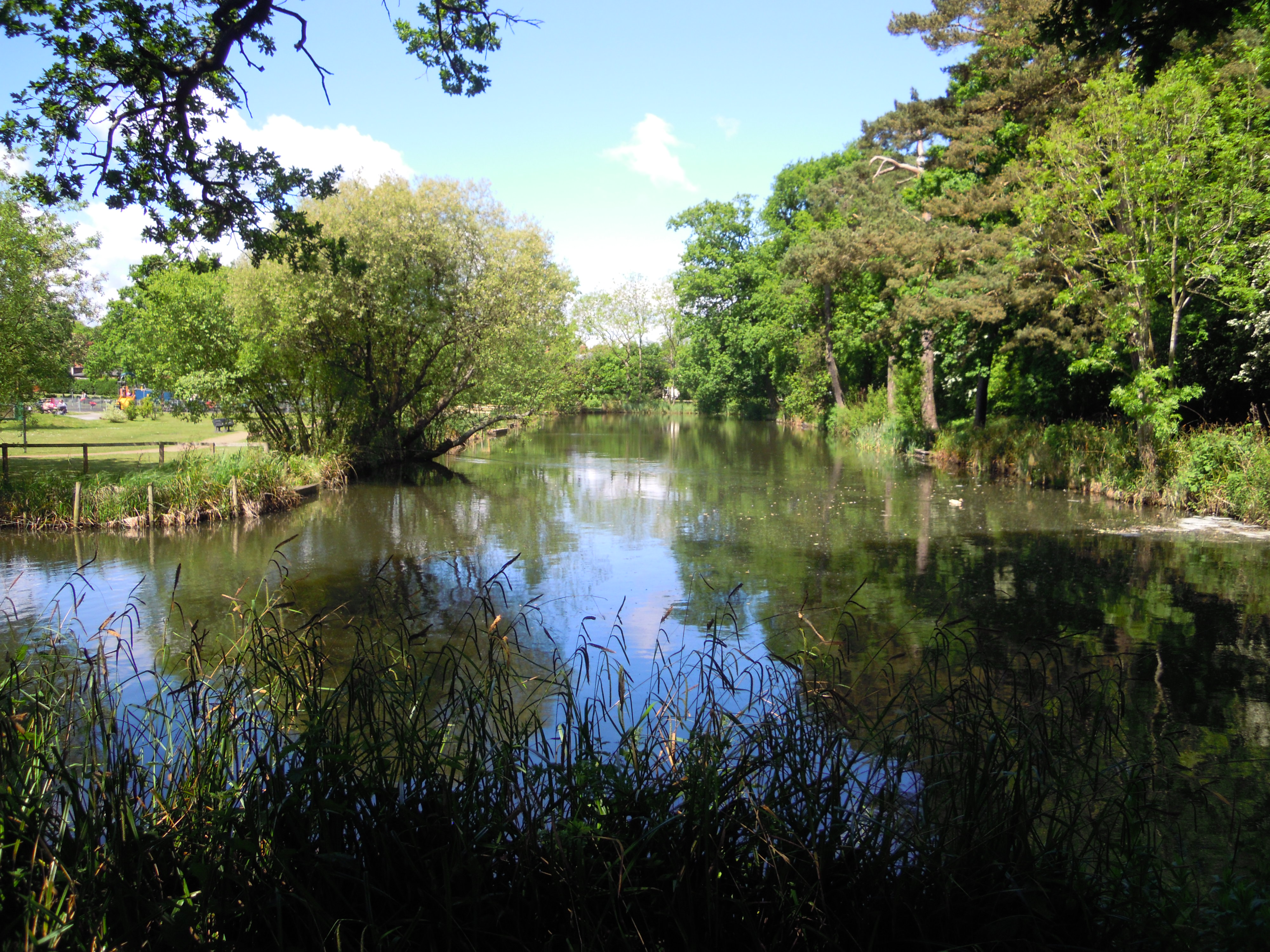
Aldershot Park lake

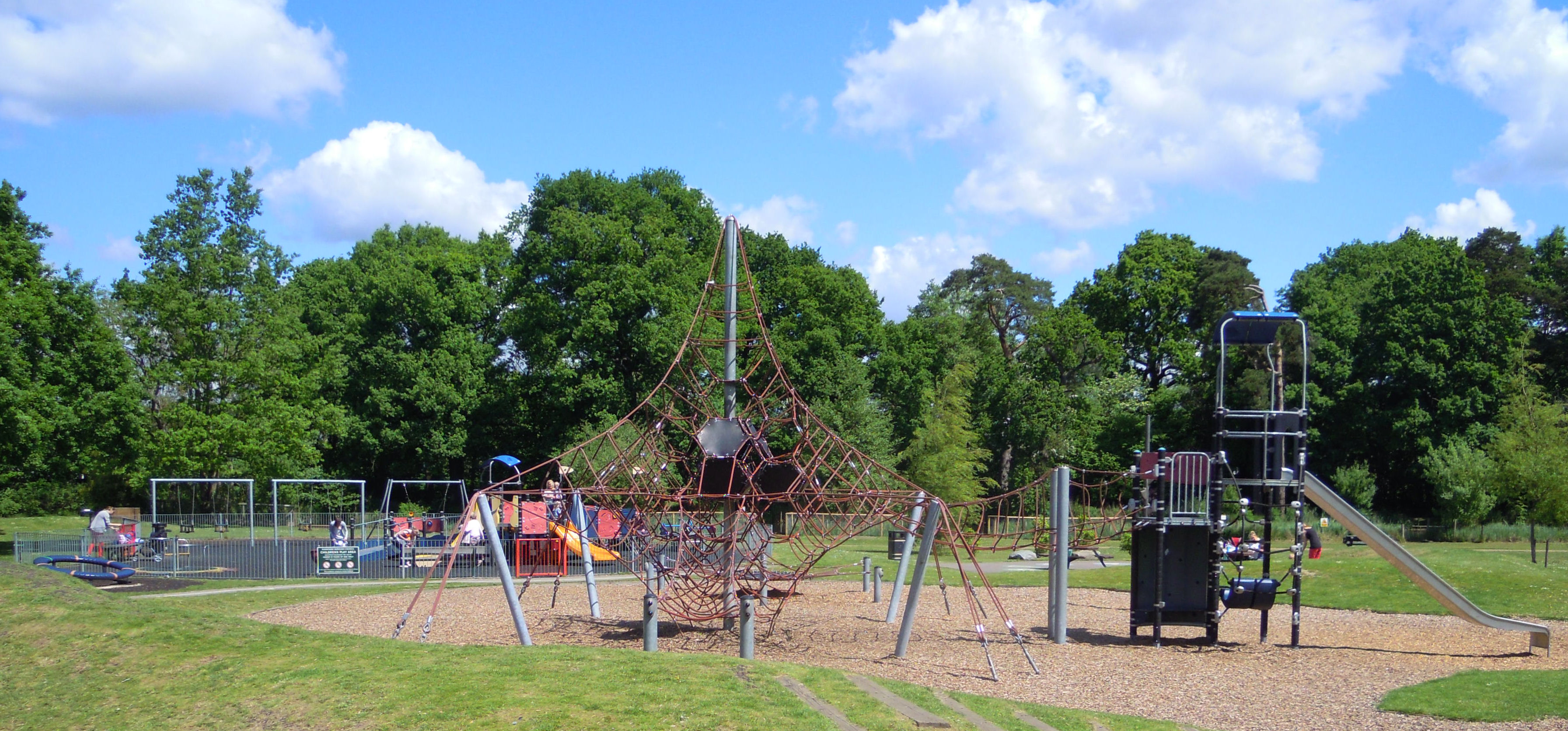
The children's playarea

Facilities at Aldershot Park include an extensive children's play area, which opened in 2010, as well as five football pitches and two rugby pitches (one floodlit) plus a pitch and artificial strip for Aldershot Cricket Club. The Aldershot Park Pavilion provides changing rooms for sports teams and a Club Room for meetings.

The large Aldershot Park lake is home to the Aldershot Park Angling Club.

== See also ==
- Brickfields Country Park
- Manor Park
- Municipal Gardens, Aldershot
- Princes Gardens, Aldershot
- Rowhill Nature Reserve
