= Rushmoor Borough Council elections =

Local elections in England

Wards of Rushmoor Borough

One-third of Rushmoor Borough Council in Hampshire, England, is elected each year, followed by one year without election. From 1979, the council had 15 three-member wards, reduced to 14 wards in 2002 and 13 in 2012. Each ward elects 3 of the 39 councillors, one in each election year, for a term of four years, except in years when ward boundaries are changed when all councillors are elected for terms depending on their position in the poll.

== Council composition ==
Composition of the council
Year	Conservative	Labour	Liberal Democrats (Note: Includes totals for the predecessors of the Liberal Democrats, the Liberal Party and SDP (both of which participated in the Alliance).)	Reform	UKIP	Independents & Others	Council control after election
Local government reorganisation; council established (43 seats)
1973	20	9	7	–	–	7	No overall control
1976	30	5	4	–	–	4	Conservative
New ward boundaries (45 seats)
1979	29	6	4	–	–	6	Conservative
1980	22	11	6	–	–	6	No overall control
1982	23	12	7	–	–	3	Conservative
1983	29	10	5	–	–	1	Conservative
1984	31	9	5	–	–	0	Conservative
1986	30	6	0	–	–	0	Conservative
1987	31	6	8	–	–	0	Conservative
1988	32	5	8	–	–	0	Conservative
1990	32	5	8	–	–	0	Conservative
1991	30	7	8	–	–	0	Conservative
1992	30	6	9	–	–	0	Conservative
1994	18	11	15	–	0	0	No overall control
1995	18	11	15	–	0	1	No overall control
1996	13	14	18	–	0	1	No overall control
1998	17	14	14	–	0	0	No overall control
1999	18	13	14	–	0	0	No overall control
2000	24	10	10	–	0	1	Conservative
New ward boundaries (42 seats)
2002	25	6	10	–	0	1	Conservative
2003	25	6	10	–	0	1	Conservative
2004	24	5	12	–	0	1	Conservative
2006	24	5	11	–	0	2	Conservative
2007	28	5	8	–	0	1	Conservative
2008	29	5	8	–	0	0	Conservative
2010	30	6	6	–	0	0	Conservative
2011	32	6	4	–	0	0	Conservative
New ward boundaries (39 seats)
2012	25	11	0	–	3	0	Conservative
2014	24	12	0	–	3	0	Conservative
2015	26	11	0	–	2	0	Conservative
2016	27	10	0	–	2	0	Conservative
2018	25	11	1	–	0	0	Conservative
2019	26	11	2	–	0	0	Conservative
2021	29	9	1	0	0	0	Conservative
2022	28	9	2	0	0	0	Conservative
2023	23	14	2	0	0	0	Conservative
2024	15	21	3	0	0	0	Labour
2026	10	17	3	6	0	3	No overall control

== Borough result maps ==
2002 results map

2003 results map

2004 results map

2006 results map

2007 results map

2008 results map

2010 results map

2011 results map

2012 results map

2014 results map

2015 results map

2016 results map

2018 results map

2019 results map

2021 results map

2022 results map

2023 results map

2024 results map

2026 results map

== By-election results ==
=== 1994–1998 ===
St Marks by-election 30 January 1997
Party	Candidate	Votes	%	±%
Liberal Democrats		466	37.4	
Conservative		373	29.9	
Labour		224	18.0	
Independent		112	9.0	
Independent		72	5.8	
Majority		93	7.5	
Turnout		1,247	33.1	
Liberal Democrats hold		Swing		

=== 1998–2002 ===
West Heath by-election 25 November 1999
Party	Candidate	Votes	%	±%
Liberal Democrats		467	49.0	+0.9
Conservative		429	45.0	+5.3
Labour		58	6.1	−6.0
Majority		38	4.0	
Turnout		954	24.7	
Liberal Democrats hold		Swing		

=== 2002–2006 ===
St Johns by-election 10 November 2005
Party	Candidate	Votes	%	±%
Liberal Democrats	Suzan Gadsby	573	49.1	+25.0
Conservative	David Thomas	496	42.5	−19.2
Labour	June Smith	99	8.5	−5.7
Majority		77	6.6	
Turnout		1,168	26.9	
Liberal Democrats gain from Conservative		Swing		

North Town by-election 26 January 2006
Party	Candidate	Votes	%	±%
Labour	Frank Rust	649	57.7	+4.1
Conservative	Eric Neal	286	25.4	−3.3
Liberal Democrats	Philip Thompson	189	16.8	+5.7
Majority		363	32.3	
Turnout		1,124	25.5	
Labour hold		Swing		

=== 2006–2010 ===
Grange by-election 25 July 2006
Party	Candidate	Votes	%	±%
Liberal Democrats	Hazel Manning	515	43.2	+18.7
Conservative	Rosemary Possee	445	37.4	−7.5
BNP	Janette Pedrick	137	11.5	−5.4
Labour	Clive Grattan	94	7.9	−5.9
Majority		70	5.8	
Turnout		1,191	30.7	
Liberal Democrats gain from Conservative		Swing		

Heronwood by-election 19 July 2007
Party	Candidate	Votes	%	±%
Labour	Terence Bridgeman	423	37.3	−1.7
Liberal Democrats	Paul Lynch-Bowers	382	33.6	+7.7
Conservative	Simon Poole	330	29.1	−6.0
Majority		41	3.7	
Turnout		1,135	24.9	
Labour gain from Liberal Democrats		Swing		

Heron Wood by-election 10 December 2009
Party	Candidate	Votes	%	±%
Labour	Alex Crawford	437	41.6	+11.6
Liberal Democrats	Philip Thompson	354	33.7	−8.1
Conservative	Andrew Duncan	259	24.7	−3.5
Majority		83	7.9	
Turnout		1,050	22.0	
Labour gain from Liberal Democrats		Swing		

=== 2010–2014 ===
Wellington by-election 23 September 2010
Party	Candidate	Votes	%	±%
Conservative	Attika Choudhary	270	35.8	−6.8
Liberal Democrats	Mitch Manning	238	31.6	−3.7
Labour	Sam Wines	184	24.4	+2.3
UKIP	Eddie Poole	50	6.6	+6.6
Independent	Roger Watkins	12	1.6	+1.6
Majority		32	4.2	
Turnout		754	13.0	
Conservative hold		Swing		

=== 2014–2018 ===
West Heath by-election 9 October 2014
Party	Candidate	Votes	%	±%
UKIP	Dave Bell	662	50.8	+4.2
Conservative	Brian Parker	312	24.0	−5.4
Labour	Sue Gadsby	196	15.1	−0.3
Liberal Democrats	Charlie Fraser-Fleming	132	10.1	+1.5
Majority		350	26.9	
Turnout		1,302		
UKIP hold		Swing		

St John's by-election 4 May 2017
Party	Candidate	Votes	%	±%
Conservative	Jonathan Canty	870	53.5	+8.9
UKIP	Chris Harding	305	18.7	−10.6
Labour	Sue Gadsby	262	16.1	−2.2
Liberal Democrats	Charlie Fraser-Fleming	190	11.7	+3.9
Majority		565	34.7	
Turnout		1,627		
Conservative hold		Swing		

=== 2018–2022 ===
St Mark's by-election 12 September 2019
Party	Candidate	Votes	%	±%
Liberal Democrats	Thomas Mitchell	687	54.7	+16.5
Conservative	Leon Hargreaves	450	35.9	+2.2
Labour	Carl Hewitt	118	9.4	−6.1
Majority		237	18.9	
Turnout		1255	25%	
Liberal Democrats hold		Swing		

=== 2026–2030 ===
Wellington by-election 16 July 2026
Party	Candidate	Votes	%	±%
Labour	Fouzia Khan	408	42.1	+8.8
Conservative	Prabesh KC	199	20.5	−3.0
Reform	Rohin Shingadia	196	20.2	−7.5
Green	Andy Wilson	118	12.2	+12.2
Liberal Democrats	Christopher Peart	49	5.1	+5.1
Majority		209	21.5	
Turnout		970		
Labour hold		Swing		
