= 2006 Rushmoor Borough Council election =

2006 UK local government election

Map of the results of the 2006 Rushmoor council election. Conservatives in blue, Liberal Democrats in yellow and Labour in red.

The 2006 Rushmoor Council election took place on 4 May 2006 to elect members of Rushmoor Borough Council in Hampshire, England. One third of the council was up for election and the Conservative Party stayed in overall control of the council.

After the election, the composition of the council was:

- Conservative 25
- Liberal Democrat 10
- Labour 5
- Independent 2

== Campaign ==
Before the election the council had 22 Conservative, 11 Liberal Democrat, 5 Labour and 3 independent councillors. In total 52 candidates were standing in the election with 14 seats being contested. These candidates came from the Conservatives, Liberal Democrats, Labour, British National Party, Green Party, Official Monster Raving Loony Party and 1 independent.

Issues in the election included anti-social behaviour, regeneration of Aldershot, services for young people, traffic management and the environment. The 3 candidates from the British National Party also caused controversy in the election after they distributed leaflets in Farnborough containing pictures of Mohammad as a suicide bomber.

The election had Rushmoor be one of a few councils trialing early voting in an attempt to increase turnout. Polling stations were open in the week leading up to the election in Aldershot and Farnborough, as well as one in Aldershot Military Town. Turnout in the election as a whole was 36%, up 5% on the 2003 election with over 1,200 peoples using the 2 early polling stations in Aldershot and Farnborough town centres. However the polling station in the military town, open on the day before the election, got only 46 votes cast.

== Election result ==
The results saw the Conservatives increase their majority after gaining 3 seats to hold 25 of the 42 seats. The Conservatives gained two seats from the Liberal Democrats and one seat in Knellwood, where the previous independent councillor, Patrick Kirby, stepped down at the election. The gains from the Liberal Democrats came in Cove and Southwood ward where the Conservatives won by 310 votes, and West Heath where the margin was much closer at only 13 votes. These defeats meant the Liberal Democrats were reduced to 10 seats on the council, compared to 5 for Labour and 2 independents.

Labour held both of the seats they had been defending with the result in Heron Wood being closest with Labour holding on by 108 votes. The British National Party saw an increased vote, with the party winning 20% in Mayfield, just 28 votes short of second place. Meanwhile, the candidate from the Official Monster Raving Loony Party, whose policies had included a pledge to make people buy £90 worth of Smarties each week, won 59 votes in Rowhill ward.

Rushmoor local election result 2006
Party	Seats	Gains	Losses	Net gain/loss	Seats %	Votes %	Votes	+/−
Conservative	9	3	0	+3	64.3	45.7	9,801	+2.0%
Liberal Democrats	3	0	2	-2	21.4	30.4	6,528	-0.8%
Labour	2	0	0	0	14.3	14.6	3,124	-2.9%
BNP	0	0	0	0	0	3.6	768	+0.9%
Independent	0	0	1	-1	0	3.0	638	+0.7%
Green	0	0	0	0	0	2.6	550	+1.2%
Monster Raving Loony	0	0	0	0	0	0.3	59	+0.3%

== Ward results ==
Cove & Southwood
Party	Candidate	Votes	%	±%
Conservative	Martin Tennant	862	53.5	+8.5
Liberal Democrats	Anoop Verma	552	34.2	−13.3
Labour	Edward Shelton	113	7.0	−0.5
Green	James Page	85	5.3	+5.3
Majority		310	19.3	
Turnout		1,612	38.4	+1.4
Conservative gain from Liberal Democrats		Swing		

Empress
Party	Candidate	Votes	%	±%
Conservative	David Clifford	1,222	63.8	+18.9
Liberal Democrats	Crispin Allard	544	28.4	+4.6
Labour	Christopher Wright	150	7.8	−1.5
Majority		678	35.4	+14.3
Turnout		1,916	43.3	−0.7
Conservative hold		Swing		

Fernhill
Party	Candidate	Votes	%	±%
Conservative	Alan Farrier	814	56.1	+5.0
Liberal Democrats	Leola Card	369	25.4	+1.7
BNP	Cheryl Glass	268	18.5	+4.4
Majority		445	30.7	+3.3
Turnout		1,451	35.5	+0.5
Conservative hold		Swing		

Grange
Party	Candidate	Votes	%	±%
Conservative	Michael Smith	683	44.9	+4.0
Liberal Democrats	Hazel Manning	373	24.5	+0.2
BNP	Janette Pedrick	257	16.9	+3.0
Labour	June Smith	209	13.7	−7.2
Majority		310	20.4	+3.8
Turnout		1,522	39.2	+3.2
Conservative hold		Swing		

Heron Wood
Party	Candidate	Votes	%	±%
Labour	Michael Roberts	519	37.0	+4.8
Liberal Democrats	Ian Colpus	411	29.3	−8.7
Conservative	Hedy Brennan	381	27.2	−2.7
Green	Samantha Stacey	90	6.4	+6.4
Majority		108	7.7	
Turnout		1,401	32.5	−1.5
Labour hold		Swing		

Knellwood
Party	Candidate	Votes	%	±%
Conservative	Adam Jackman	852	46.3	−12.7
Independent	Guy Eaglestone	564	30.7	+30.7
Liberal Democrats	Abu Bakar	307	16.7	−12.5
Labour	William Tootill	116	6.3	−5.5
Majority		288	15.7	−14.1
Turnout		1,839	45.0	+1.0
Conservative gain from Independent		Swing		

Manor Park
Party	Candidate	Votes	%	±%
Conservative	Edmund Poole	723	48.3	+4.7
Liberal Democrats	Philip Thompson	467	31.2	−14.9
Green	Sarah Fisher	178	11.9	+11.9
Labour	Lesley Pestridge	130	8.7	−1.6
Majority		256	17.1	
Turnout		1,498	33.4	−6.5
Conservative hold		Swing		

Mayfield
Party	Candidate	Votes	%	±%
Liberal Democrats	Craig Card	558	46.5	−4.9
Conservative	Stephen Smith	271	22.6	+3.1
BNP	Warren Glass	243	20.2	+5.3
Labour	Clive Grattan	129	10.7	−3.4
Majority		287	23.9	−8.0
Turnout		1,201	30.9	−1.0
Liberal Democrats hold		Swing		

North Town
Party	Candidate	Votes	%	±%
Labour	Keith Dibble	810	57.5	+3.9
Conservative	Robert Lee	411	29.2	+0.5
Liberal Democrats	Michael Kilburn	103	7.3	−3.8
Green	Adam Stacey	85	6.0	−0.7
Majority		399	28.3	+3.4
Turnout		1,409	31.2	−2.8
Labour hold		Swing		

Rowhill
Party	Candidate	Votes	%	±%
Conservative	Roger Kimber	970	60.9	+6.6
Liberal Democrats	Peter Pearson	260	16.3	+1.7
Labour	Jill Clark	193	12.1	−9.6
Green	Julia Fowler	112	7.0	−2.4
Monster Raving Loony	Robert Stanton	59	3.7	+3.7
Majority		710	44.5	+11.9
Turnout		1,594	39.1	−0.9
Conservative hold		Swing		

St John's
Party	Candidate	Votes	%	±%
Liberal Democrats	Suzan Gadsby	852	51.1	+27.0
Conservative	Jane Shattock	699	41.9	−19.8
Labour	Sean Clarke	116	7.0	−7.2
Majority		153	9.2	
Turnout		1,667	37.5	+2.5
Liberal Democrats hold		Swing		

St Mark's
Party	Candidate	Votes	%	±%
Liberal Democrats	Alistair Mackie	829	48.8	+4.1
Conservative	Rosemary Possee	696	40.9	−4.5
Labour	Barry Jones	175	10.3	+0.3
Majority		133	7.9	
Turnout		1,700	38.4	+1.5
Liberal Democrats hold		Swing		

Wellington
Party	Candidate	Votes	%	±%
Conservative	Eric Neal	424	44.6	−0.7
Labour	Alexander Crawford	330	34.7	+5.6
Liberal Democrats	Josephine Fraser-Fleming	123	12.9	−1.0
Independent	Roger Watkins	74	7.8	+0.6
Majority		94	9.9	−6.3
Turnout		951	21.8	−1.2
Conservative hold		Swing		

West Heath
Party	Candidate	Votes	%	±%
Conservative	David Thomas	793	46.5	+10.8
Liberal Democrats	Josephine Murphy	780	45.7	+6.6
Labour	Philip Collins	134	7.9	−1.3
Majority		13	0.8	
Turnout		1,707	42.3	+1.3
Conservative gain from Liberal Democrats		Swing		

Preceded by 2004 Rushmoor Council election	Rushmoor local elections	Succeeded by 2007 Rushmoor Council election
