= 1998 Rushmoor Borough Council election =

1998 UK local government election

The 1998 Rushmoor Council election took place on 7 May 1998 to elect members of Rushmoor Borough Council in Hampshire, England. One third of the council was up for election and the council stayed under no overall control.

After the election, the composition of the council was

- Conservative 17
- Labour 14
- Liberal Democrat 14

== Election result ==
Rushmoor local election result 1998
Party	Seats	Gains	Losses	Net gain/loss	Seats %	Votes %	Votes	+/−
Conservative	8			+4	50.0			
Labour	4			0	25.0			
Liberal Democrats	4			-4	25.0			

Preceded by 1996 Rushmoor Council election	Rushmoor local elections	Succeeded by 1999 Rushmoor Council election
