= 2012 Rushmoor Borough Council election =

2012 UK local government election

← 2011	3 May 2012	2014 →

All 39 seats to Rushmoor Borough Council 20 seats needed for a majority
	First party	Second party	Third party
Party	Conservative	Labour	UKIP
Seats won	25	11	3
Popular vote	8,785	5,551	1,913
- Results by Ward
Council control before election
Conservative
Council control after election
Conservative

The 2012 Rushmoor Council elections took place on Thursday 3 May 2012 to elect members of Rushmoor Borough Council in Hampshire, England.

It was a very good night for the Labour Party and their Leader Cllr Keith Dibble who achieved the highest percentage vote on the night. Labour gained the three seats in the new Cherrywood ward in Farnborough. The first time Labour has had councillors in Farnborough for ten years.

The controlling Conservatives lost 5 seats, Labour gained 5, UKIP gained 1 and the Lib Dems lost all 4 seats. The Conservatives had a reduced majority

The whole of the council was up for election following a boundary review that has reorganised the distribution of council wards throughout the borough. The council will now be composed of 13 wards, each of which will elect three members to create a council of 39 councillors.

== Election result ==
Rushmoor local election result 2012
Party	Seats	Gains	Losses	Net gain/loss	Seats %	Votes %	Votes	+/−
Conservative	25	0	5	-5		44.5%	8,785	
Labour	11	5	0	+5		28.1%	5,551	
Liberal Democrats	0	0	4	-4		17.3%	3,413	
UKIP	3	1	0	+1		9.7%	1,913	
Christian	0	0	0	0		0.5%	93	

== Ward results ==
=== Aldershot ===
Aldershot Park
Party	Candidate	Votes	%	±%
Labour	Mike Roberts	811	21.9%	
Labour	Don Cappleman	754	20.4%	
Labour	Terry Bridgeman	677	18.3%	
Conservative	Glen Slade	451	12.2%	
Conservative	Neil Watkin	406	11.0%	
Conservative	Lucy Perrin	401	10.8%	
Liberal Democrats	Roland Collins	202	5.5%	
Turnout		1,369	25.12	
Labour win (new seat)				
Labour win (new seat)				
Labour win (new seat)				

=== Cherrywood ===
Cherrywood
Party	Candidate	Votes	%	±%
Labour	Clive Grattan	453	11.8%	
Labour	Barry Jones	445	11.6%	
Labour	Les Taylor	435	11.3%	
Conservative	Mike Smith	426	11.1%	
Conservative	Jackie Hammond	416	10.9%	
Conservative	Steve Masterson	409	10.7%	
Liberal Democrats	Michael Manning	361	9.4%	
Liberal Democrats	Craig Card	354	9.2%	
Liberal Democrats	Shaun Murphy	323	8.4%	
UKIP	Albert Buddle	212	5.5%	
Turnout		1,369	26.6	
Labour win (new seat)				
Labour win (new seat)				
Labour win (new seat)				

=== Cove and Southwood ===
Cove and Southwood
Party	Candidate	Votes	%	±%
Conservative	Susan Carter	940		
Conservative	Alan Chainey	930		
Conservative	Martin Tennant	804		
Labour	Clive Andrews	342		
Labour	Yvonne Hammond	322		
Labour	Ed Shelton	311		
Liberal Democrats	Brian Jupp	298		
UKIP	Jane Shattock	292		
Turnout		1,596	28.8	
Conservative win (new seat)				
Conservative win (new seat)				
Conservative win (new seat)				

=== Empress ===
Empress
Party	Candidate	Votes	%	±%
Liberal Democrats	Stephen Chowns	311	23.44	
Conservative	David Clifford	838	63.15	
Conservative	Gareth Lyon	789	59.46	
Labour	Stephen Martin	280	21.10	
Conservative	Brian Parker	740	55.76	
Labour	Sharon Parkinson	295	22.23	
Labour	Christopher Wright	304	22.91	
Turnout		1,327	29.7	

=== Fernhill ===
Fernhill
Party	Candidate	Votes	%	±%
Labour	Martin Coule	345	24.47	
Conservative	Alan Ferrier	915	64.89	
Liberal Democrats	Hammy Hamilton	262	18.58	
Labour	Peter Hayward	300	21.28	
Conservative	John Marsh	892	63.26	
Conservative	Ken Muschamp	860	61.00	
Labour	Robin Vyrnwy-Price	296	21.00	
Turnout		1,410	25.6	

=== Knellwood ===
Knellwood
Party	Candidate	Votes	%	±%
Conservative	Roland Dibbs	1099	61.1	
Conservative	Adam Jackman	1084	60.22	
Liberal Democrats	June Mackie	428	23.78	
Labour	Trevor Simpson	344	19.11	
Labour	June Smith	439	24.39	
Conservative	Paul Taylor	1105	61.39	
Labour	William Tootill	353	19.61	
Turnout		1,800	31.6	

=== Manor Park ===
Manor Park
Party	Candidate	Votes	%	±%
Liberal Democrats	Maurice Banner	189	12.69	
Conservative	Peter Crerar	736	49.43	
Conservative	Ron Hughes	744	49.97	
Labour	Lesley Pestridge	422	28.34	
UKIP	Eddie Poole	281	18.87	
Labour	Carol Rust	446	29.95	
Labour	Dominique Swaddling	407	27.33	
Conservative	Bruce Thomas	617	41.44	
Turnout		1,489	26.17	

=== North Town ===
North Town
Party	Candidate	Votes	%	±%
Conservative	Lee Dawson	334	25.59	
Labour	Keith Dibble	907	69.50	
Labour	Susan Dibble	832	63.75	
Conservative	Norma Francis-Crerar	307	23.52	
Labour	Frank Rust	804	61.61	
Conservative	Calum Stewart	369	28.28	
Turnout		1,305	26.31	

=== Rowhill ===
Rowhill
Party	Candidate	Votes	%	±%
Conservative	Charles Choudhary	765	48.57	
Conservative	Sophia Choudhary	753	47.81	
Labour	Jill Clark	505	32.04	
Labour	Jim Dymond	479	30.41	
Labour	Jan Matthews	482	30.60	
Liberal Democrats	Pete Pearson	317	20.13	
Conservative	David Welch	808	51.30	
Turnout		1,575	29.72	

=== St John's ===
St John’s
Party	Candidate	Votes	%	±%
Labour	Nick Bragger	265	19.43	
Conservative	Barbara Hurst	774	56.77	
Labour	Mary Lawrence	284	20.82	
Labour	Donald MacGregor	293	21.48	
Conservative	Peter Moyle	780	57.18	
UKIP	Matthew Powers	260	19.06	
Liberal Democrats	John Simpkins	233	17.08	
Conservative	Jacqui Vosper	738	54.11	
Turnout		1,364	25.9	

=== St Mark's ===
St Mark’s
Party	Candidate	Votes	%	±%
Liberal Democrats	Crispin Allard	483	33.85	
Conservative	Diane Bedford	720	50.46	
Christian	Juliana Brimicombe	93	6.52	
Conservative	Rod Cooper	562	39.38	
Conservative	Liz Corps	597	41.84	
Labour	Sohail Jannesari	214	15.00	
Labour	Laura Jones	249	17.45	
Liberal Democrats	Abul Chowdhury	371	26.00	
Liberal Democrats	Alistair Mackie	472	33.08	
Labour	Colin Southon	220	15.42	
Turnout		1,427	28.6	

=== Wellington ===
Wellington
Party	Candidate	Votes	%	±%
Conservative	Michael Ashworth	181	39.69	
Conservative	Attika Choudhary	191	41.89	
Labour	Alex Crawford	220	48.25	
Labour	Jennifer Evans	213	46.71	
Labour	Prabesh Kc	186	40.79	
Liberal Democrats	Mitch Manning	78	16.89	
Conservative	Eric Neal	159	34.87	
Turnout		456	14.00	

=== West Heath ===
West Heath
Party	Candidate	Votes	%	±%
Labour	Philip Collins	237	13	
Conservative	Derek Cornwell	498	27	
Liberal Democrats	Neville Dewey	223	12	
Conservative	David Gilbert	451	24	
Labour	Alex Hylan	220	12	
Labour	Imtiaz Malik	186	10	
Liberal Democrats	Jo Murphy	252	14	
UKIP	Malcolm Small	828	46	
UKIP	Steve Smith	821	45	
UKIP	Mark Staplehurst	868	47	
Conservative	David Thomas	473	26	
Liberal Democrats	Philip Thompson	230	13	
Turnout		1,816	35.9	

Preceded by 2011 Rushmoor Council election	Rushmoor local elections	Succeeded by 2014 Rushmoor Council election
