= 2000 Rushmoor Borough Council election =

2000 UK local government election

The 2000 Rushmoor Council election took place on 4 May 2000 to elect members of Rushmoor Borough Council in Hampshire, England. One third of the council was up for election and the Conservative Party gained overall control of the council from no overall control.

The election took place at the same time as a referendum on whether to change the name of the borough council from Rushmoor to either Aldershot and Farnborough, or Farnborough and Aldershot. The change of name was rejected with 13,891 votes against to only 2,747 in favour on a turnout of 29%.

After the election, the composition of the council was

- Conservative 24
- Liberal Democrat 10
- Labour 10
- Independent 1

== Election result ==
Rushmoor local election result 2000
Party	Seats	Gains	Losses	Net gain/loss	Seats %	Votes %	Votes	+/−
Conservative	8			+4	53.3	48.0	8,353	
Liberal Democrats	4			-2	26.7	28.2	4,907	
Labour	2			-3	13.3	17.8	3,097	
Independent	1			+1	6.7	5.4	945	
Green	0			0	0	0.6	100	

== Ward results ==
Alexandra
Party	Candidate	Votes	%	±%
Conservative	Mohammad Choudhary	613	56.1	
Labour	Jill Clark	316	28.9	
Liberal Democrats	David Newman	120	11.0	
Green	Peter Barnett	44	4.0	
Majority		297	27.2	
Turnout		1,093	28	

Belle Vue
Party	Candidate	Votes	%	±%
Labour	Keith Dibble	575	63.7	
Conservative	Alistair Morley	269	29.8	
Liberal Democrats	Peter Woodcock	59	6.5	
Majority		306	33.9	
Turnout		903	27	

Cove
Party	Candidate	Votes	%	±%
Conservative	David Thomas	680	46.9	
Liberal Democrats	Maurice Banner	652	45.0	
Labour	Edward Shelton	117	8.1	
Majority		28	1.9	
Turnout		1,449	29.7	

Empress
Party	Candidate	Votes	%	±%
Conservative	Rosemary Possee	954	68.9	
Liberal Democrats	Stephen Chowns	302	21.8	
Labour	David Hercock	128	9.2	
Majority		652	47.1	
Turnout		1,384	37.6	

Fernhill
Party	Candidate	Votes	%	±%
Conservative	Alan Ferrier	688	51.8	
Liberal Democrats	Guy Eaglestone	547	41.2	
Labour	Clive Grattan	94	7.1	
Majority		141	10.6	
Turnout		1,329	30	

Grange
Party	Candidate	Votes	%	±%
Conservative	Michael Smith	631	51.7	
Labour	Barry Jones	435	35.6	
Liberal Democrats	Josephine Fraser-Fleming	100	8.2	
Independent	Arthur Pendragon	55	4.5	
Majority		196	16.1	
Turnout		1,221	36	

Heronwood
Party	Candidate	Votes	%	±%
Labour	Donald Cappleman	370	59.9	
Conservative	Rosemary Stevens	153	24.8	
Liberal Democrats	Philip Thompson	73	11.8	
Green	Carrie De Fey	22	3.6	
Majority		217	35.1	
Turnout		618	20	

Knellwood
Party	Candidate	Votes	%	±%
Independent	James Kirby	890	49.4	
Conservative	Geoffrey Woolger	721	40.0	
Liberal Democrats	Alistair Mackie	116	6.4	
Labour	Malcolm Gaskell	74	4.1	
Majority		169	9.4	
Turnout		1,801	45.9	

Manor
Party	Candidate	Votes	%	±%
Liberal Democrats	George Paparesti	801	51.2	
Conservative	Philip Le Roux	653	41.8	
Labour	Kerry Ballard	110	7.0	
Majority		148	9.4	
Turnout		1,564	36	

Mayfield
Party	Candidate	Votes	%	±%
Liberal Democrats	Craig Card	342	49.6	
Conservative	Suzanne Smith	233	33.8	
Labour	Michael Westlake	115	16.7	
Majority		109	15.8	
Turnout		690	18.2	

Newport
Party	Candidate	Votes	%	±%
Conservative	Sharon Silver	351	43.7	
Labour	Christopher Hollebon	345	42.9	
Liberal Democrats	Nickolas Burfield	74	9.2	
Green	Adam Stacey	34	4.2	
Majority		6	0.8	
Turnout		804	23	

Queens
Party	Candidate	Votes	%	±%
Conservative	Francis Williams	221	48.1	
Liberal Democrats	Muriel Burton	195	42.5	
Labour	Jerry Wines	43	9.4	
Majority		26	5.6	
Turnout		459	14	

St Marks
Party	Candidate	Votes	%	±%
Liberal Democrats	John Starling	724	49.5	
Conservative	Richard Gardner	636	43.4	
Labour	Sean Clarke	104	7.1	
Majority		88	6.1	
Turnout		1,464	36.1	

St Johns
Party	Candidate	Votes	%	±%
Conservative	Graham Tucker	982	71.3	
Liberal Democrats	Majorie Pratt	219	15.9	
Labour	Mary Lawrance	177	12.8	
Majority		763	55.4	
Turnout		1,378	25	

Westheath
Party	Candidate	Votes	%	±%
Liberal Democrats	Josephine Murphy	583	46.8	
Conservative	Stephen Masterson	568	45.6	
Labour	Janice Ferre	94	7.6	
Majority		15	1.2	
Turnout		1,245	32.6	

Preceded by 1999 Rushmoor Council election	Rushmoor local elections	Succeeded by 2002 Rushmoor Council election
