= 2004 Rushmoor Borough Council election =

2004 UK local government election

Results of the 2004 Rushmoor Borough Council election

The 2004 Rushmoor Council election took place on 10 June 2004 to elect members of Rushmoor Borough Council in Hampshire, England. One third of the council was up for election and the Conservative Party stayed in overall control of the council.

After the election, the composition of the council was:

- Conservative 24
- Liberal Democrat 12
- Labour 5
- Independent 1

== Campaign ==
14 seats were contested in the election–a third of the council–with the Conservatives defending 9, the Liberal Democrats 3 and Labour 2. Apart from candidates from the Conservative, Liberal Democrat, Labour, Green and English Democrat parties which had stood candidates in the 2003 election, there were also 3 members of the British National Party standing in Rushmoor for the first time. They stood in 3 Farnborough wards, Fernhill, Grange and Mayfield.

2 independent candidates also contested the election. Rosemary Possee stood as an independent in Empress ward, where she had previously served as a councillor for the Conservatives before being de-selected, challenging the official Conservative candidate Patricia Hodge. The other independent candidate, taxi driver Roger Watkins, stood in Wellington ward. Watkins was investigated by the police over claims that some signatures on his nomination form had not been made by the voters themselves; however the police concluded there was no problem and Watkins accused his rivals of dirty tricks.

The contest in Heronwood ward also caused controversy after a leaflet from the Conservative candidate Eddie Poole accused the Liberal Democrat candidate Peter Sandy of "bully boy tactics". Sandy complained to council officials over the leaflet, which he described as a slur, but Poole said he stood by the comment.

== Election result ==
The results saw the Conservatives remain in control of the council with 24 of the 42 seats, but the Liberal Democrats did gain 2 to hold 12 seats. One of the gains came in Manor Park where Liberal Democrat George Paparesti returned to the council 2 years after losing his seat in the 2002 election. The other gain came in Heron Wood, which had been regarded as the safest Labour seat on the council, but saw Liberal Democrat Peter Sandy win by 88 votes defeating the Labour mayor of the council Frank Rust. This meant Labour was reduced to just 5 seats on the council, with the party's candidates having finished fourth in 4 Farnborough wards.

No other seats changed parties, but there were close results in St Marks where the Conservatives held the seat by 12 votes over the Liberal Democrats and in Cove and Southwood where the Liberal Democrats held on by 38 votes over the Conservatives. Rosemary Possee failed to win re-election in Empress ward as an independent, being beaten into third place with the Conservatives holding the seat. Overall turnout in the election was 36.5% up from the 31% seen in 2003 and boosted by an 80% increase in postal votes.

The result in Heron Wood caused controversy with the defeated Labour candidate Frank Rust blaming Tony Blair's support for the Iraq War for his defeat. Meanwhile, the Conservative member of parliament for Aldershot Gerald Howarth criticised the winning Liberal Democrat Peter Sandy for not attending the count and said that "It’s a pretty poor show. I do not feel he will be an asset to Heronwood". Peter Sandy, who is disabled, said that he had been unable to attend the count as the battery on his wheelchair was flat and he was defended by his fellow Liberal Democrats.

Rushmoor local election result 2004
Party	Seats	Gains	Losses	Net gain/loss	Seats %	Votes %	Votes	+/−
Conservative	8	0	1	-1	57.1	43.7	9,448	-1.1%
Liberal Democrats	5	2	0	+2	35.7	31.2	6,733	-2.0%
Labour	1	0	1	-1	7.1	17.5	3,774	+0.0%
BNP	0	0	0	0	0	2.7	587	+2.7%
Independent	0	0	0	0	0	2.3	506	-0.1%
Green	0	0	0	0	0	1.4	296	+0.0%
English Democrat	0	0	0	0	0	1.2	270	+0.5%

== Ward results ==
Cove & Southwood
Party	Candidate	Votes	%	±%
Liberal Democrats	John Matthews	742	47.5	−1.7
Conservative	David Thomas	704	45.0	+6.2
Labour	Edward Shelton	117	7.5	−1.8
Majority		38	2.4	−8.0
Turnout		1,563	37	+3
Liberal Democrats hold		Swing		

Empress
Party	Candidate	Votes	%	±%
Conservative	Patricia Hodge	886	44.9	−11.3
Liberal Democrats	Leola Card	469	23.8	−8.1
Independent	Rosemary Possee	434	22.0	+22.0
Labour	Christopher Wright	184	9.3	−2.6
Majority		417	21.1	−3.2
Turnout		1,973	44	+6
Conservative hold		Swing		

Fernhill
Party	Candidate	Votes	%	±%
Conservative	John Marsh	734	51.1	+0.6
Liberal Democrats	Martin Howell	340	23.7	−12.2
BNP	Cheryl Glass	203	14.1	+14.1
Labour	Martin Coule	159	11.1	−2.5
Majority		394	27.4	+12.8
Turnout		1,436	35	+6
Conservative hold		Swing		

Grange
Party	Candidate	Votes	%	±%
Conservative	Stephen Masterson	591	40.9	−11.0
Liberal Democrats	Hazel Manning	351	24.3	+8.2
Labour	Stella Olivier	302	20.9	−5.0
BNP	Janette Pedrick	201	13.9	+13.9
Majority		240	16.6	−9.3
Turnout		1,445	36	+1
Conservative hold		Swing		

Heron Wood
Party	Candidate	Votes	%	±%
Liberal Democrats	Peter Sandy	577	38.0	+20.2
Labour	Peter Rust	489	32.2	−14.8
Conservative	Edmund Poole	454	29.9	−5.3
Majority		88	5.8	
Turnout		1,520	34	+7
Liberal Democrats gain from Labour		Swing		

Knellwood
Party	Candidate	Votes	%	±%
Conservative	Paul Taylor	1,043	59.0	+12.6
Liberal Democrats	Guy Eaglestone	517	29.2	+5.3
Labour	William Tootill	208	11.8	+4.4
Majority		526	29.8	+7.3
Turnout		1,768	44	+5
Conservative hold		Swing		

Manor Park
Party	Candidate	Votes	%	±%
Liberal Democrats	George Paparesti	793	46.1	+4.2
Conservative	Andrew Hankins	749	43.6	−1.6
Labour	June Smith	177	10.3	−2.6
Majority		44	2.5	
Turnout		1,719	39.9	+6.2
Liberal Democrats gain from Conservative		Swing		

Mayfield
Party	Candidate	Votes	%	±%
Liberal Democrats	Charles Fraser-Fleming	630	51.4	−6.3
Conservative	Deborah Frew	239	19.5	+0.3
BNP	Warren Glass	183	14.9	+14.9
Labour	Clive Grattan	173	14.1	−9.1
Majority		391	31.9	−2.6
Turnout		1,225	31	+5
Liberal Democrats hold		Swing		

North Town
Party	Candidate	Votes	%	±%
Labour	Susan Dibble	787	53.6	+12.3
Conservative	Eric Neal	421	28.7	−2.5
Liberal Democrats	Simon Burfield	163	11.1	−9.7
Green	Adam Stacey	98	6.7	0.0
Majority		366	24.9	+14.8
Turnout		1,469	34	+6
Labour hold		Swing		

Rowhill
Party	Candidate	Votes	%	±%
Conservative	David Welch	881	54.3	+0.5
Labour	Jill Clark	352	21.7	+3.6
Liberal Democrats	Philip Thompson	237	14.6	−7.2
Green	Julia Fowler	152	9.4	+3.1
Majority		529	32.6	+0.5
Turnout		1,622	40	+7
Conservative hold		Swing		

St John's
Party	Candidate	Votes	%	±%
Conservative	Peter Moyle	924	61.7	−0.7
Liberal Democrats	Margaret Jupp	361	24.1	−13.5
Labour	Sean Clarke	212	14.2	+14.2
Majority		563	37.6	+12.9
Turnout		1,497	35	+10
Conservative hold		Swing		

St Mark's
Party	Candidate	Votes	%	±%
Conservative	Nigel Baines	770	45.4	−0.4
Liberal Democrats	Alistair Mackie	758	44.7	+1.0
Labour	Barry Jones	169	10.0	−0.5
Majority		12	0.7	−1.4
Turnout		1,697	36.9	+5.5
Conservative hold		Swing		

Wellington
Party	Candidate	Votes	%	±%
Conservative	Neil Watkin	453	45.3	−2.3
Labour	Alexandra Crawford	291	29.1	+1.5
Liberal Democrats	Nickolas Burfield	139	13.9	−4.1
Independent	Roger Watkins	72	7.2	+7.2
Green	Samantha Stacey	46	4.6	−2.1
Majority		162	16.2	−3.8
Turnout		1,001	23	+4
Conservative hold		Swing		

West Heath
Party	Candidate	Votes	%	±%
Liberal Democrats	Linda Neal	656	39.1	−5.7
Conservative	Roderick Baulk	599	35.7	−2.2
English Democrat	Gary Cowd	270	16.1	+8.1
Labour	Philip Collins	154	9.2	−0.2
Majority		57	3.4	−3.5
Turnout		1,679	41	+4
Liberal Democrats hold		Swing		

Preceded by 2003 Rushmoor Council election	Rushmoor local elections	Succeeded by 2006 Rushmoor Council election
