= 2019 Rushmoor Borough Council election =

Local election

← 2018	2 May 2019	2021 →

13 seats of 39 to Rushmoor Borough Council 20 seats needed for a majority
	First party	Second party	Third party
Party	Conservative	Labour	Liberal Democrats
Seats before	25	11	1
Seats won	9	3	1
Seats after	26	11	2
Seat change	Steady	Steady	Steady
Popular vote	8,239	5,798	2,162
- Results by Ward
Council control before election
Conservative
Council control after election
Conservative

The 2019 Rushmoor Borough Council election took place on 2 May 2019 to elect members of Rushmoor Borough Council in England. This was on the same day as other local elections.

== Results summary ==
Rushmoor Borough Council election, 2019
Party	Seats	Gains	Losses	Net gain/loss	Seats %	Votes %	Votes	+/−
Conservative	9	2	2	0	69.2	44.1	8,239	-3.2
Labour	3	1	1	0	23.1	31.0	5,798	-4.3
Liberal Democrats	1	1	0	0	7.7	11.6	2,162	-1.4
UKIP	0	0	1	0	0.0	9.8	1,825	+7.0
Independent	0	0	0	0	0.0	3.7	688	+3.7
Green	0	0	0	0	0.0	2.6	486	+1.2
Collective Democratic Union	0	0	0	0	0.0	1.4	262	+1.4
Union & Sovereignty	0	0	0	0	0.0	1.0	184	+0.7

== Ward results ==
=== Aldershot Park ===
Aldershot Park 2019
Party	Candidate	Votes	%	±%
Labour	Sophie Lee'Ann Porter	749	57.2	−3.0
UKIP	Jeff Boxall	308	23.5	+23.5
Conservative	Muhammad Mashood	253	19.3	−20.5
Majority		441	33.7	+13.3
Labour gain from Conservative		Swing		

=== Cherrywood ===
Cherrywood 2019
Party	Candidate	Votes	%	±%
Labour	Christine Guinness	666	49.4	−7.2
Conservative	Len Amos	334	24.8	−10.2
UKIP	Sam Gwydion Attwood	218	16.2	+16.2
Liberal Democrats	Shaun Patrick Joseph Murphy	130	9.6	+1.1
Majority		332	24.6	+3.3
Labour hold		Swing		

=== Cove and Southwood ===
Cove and Southwood 2019
Party	Candidate	Votes	%	±%
Conservative	Steve Masterson	800	49.3	−6.4
Liberal Democrats	Jill Whyman	331	20.4	+6.4
Labour	Madi Jabbi	251	15.5	−6.6
UKIP	Jenny Parsons	242	14.9	+6.6
Majority		469	28.9	−4.7
Conservative hold		Swing		

=== Empress ===
Empress 2019
Party	Candidate	Votes	%	±%
Conservative	Adrian Robert Newell	592	37.8	−11.8
Green	Donna Wallace	486	31.1	+17.9
Labour	Bill O'Donovan	379	24.2	−4.9
UKIP	John Frederick William Peckham	108	6.9	+6.9
Majority		106	6.7	−13.8
Conservative hold		Swing		

=== Fernhill ===
Fernhill 2019
Party	Candidate	Votes	%	±%
Conservative	John Henry Marsh	865	63.8	−4.6
Labour	Dave Guinness	323	23.8	−7.8
Collective Democratic Union	Bill Walker	167	12.3	+12.3
Majority		542	40	+3.2
Conservative hold		Swing		

=== Knellwood ===
Knellwood 2019
Party	Candidate	Votes	%	±%
Conservative	Calum James Stewart	902	45.0	−13.8
Liberal Democrats	Nick March	400	20.0	−0.6
Independent	Kevin Robert Joyce	261	13.0	+13.0
Labour	Gareth Idris Williams	259	12.9	−7.7
UKIP	Campbell Winder	183	9.1	+9.1
Majority		502	25	−13.2
Conservative hold		Swing		

=== Manor Park ===
Manor Park 2019
Party	Candidate	Votes	%	±%
Conservative	Peter Ian Charles Crerar	1,022	53.0	+2.6
Labour	John David Mairs	669	34.7	−14.9
UKIP	Gillian Margaret Bailey	239	12.4	+12.4
Majority		353	18.3	+17.5
Conservative hold		Swing		

=== North Town ===
North Town 2019
Party	Candidate	Votes	%	±%
Labour	Gaynor Frances Austin	940	62.5	−6.2
Conservative	Stuart Trussler	565	37.5	+12.9
Majority		375	25	−19.1
Labour hold		Swing		

=== Rowhill ===
Rowhill 2019
Party	Candidate	Votes	%	±%
Conservative	Charles Choudhary	683	34.9	−11.3
Labour	Jennifer Mary Evans	466	23.8	−8.7
Liberal Democrats	Alan Hilliar	421	21.5	+0.3
UKIP	Tommy James Anderson	293	15.0	+15.0
Collective Democratic Union	Kevin Betsworth	95	4.9	+4.9
Majority		217	11.1	−2.6
Conservative hold		Swing		

=== St John’s ===
St John’s 2019
Party	Candidate	Votes	%	±%
Conservative	Peter James Cullum	877	72.4	+8.0
Labour	June Smith	334	27.6	+5.3
Majority		543	44.8	+2.7
Conservative hold		Swing		

=== St Mark’s ===
St Mark’s 2019
Party	Candidate	Votes	%	±%
Liberal Democrats	Alain Stephen Dekker	556	38.2	−0.8
Conservative	Liz Corps	491	33.7	−3.1
Labour	Carl Robert Hewitt	226	15.5	−4.9
Union & Sovereignty	Zack Culshaw	184	12.6	+8.7
Majority		65	4.5	+2.3
Liberal Democrats gain from Conservative		Swing	6.7	

=== Wellington ===
Wellington 2019
Party	Candidate	Votes	%	±%
Conservative	Prabesh KC	328	46.9	+7.9
Labour	Yvette Catherine Dean	286	40.9	−11.5
Liberal Democrats	Thomas William Mitchell	85	12.2	+3.6
Majority		42	6.0	
Conservative gain from Labour		Swing	9.7	

=== West Heath ===
West Heath 2019
Party	Candidate	Votes	%	±%
Conservative	Lee Jeffers	527	31.4	−8.8
Independent	David Martin Thomas Bell	427	25.5	+25.5
Labour	Rebekkah Thomas	250	14.9	−7.9
Liberal Democrats	Craig William Card	239	14.3	−5.6
UKIP	Chris Harding	234	14.0	−10.9
Majority		100	5.9	
Conservative gain from UKIP		Swing		
