= 2008 Rushmoor Borough Council election =

2008 UK local government election

Map of the results of the 2008 Rushmoor council election. Conservatives in blue, Liberal Democrats in yellow and Labour in red.

The 2008 Rushmoor Council election took place on 1 May 2008 to elect members of Rushmoor Borough Council in Hampshire, England. One third of the council was up for election and the Conservative Party stayed in overall control of the council.

After the election, the composition of the council was:

- Conservative 29
- Liberal Democrat 8
- Labour 5

== Campaign ==
Before the election the Conservatives held 26 seats, the Liberal Democrats 7, Labour 6 and a further 3 vacant. 15 seats were up for election with 2 seats in St Johns ward being contested after the death of Conservative councillor Graham Tucker. The other 2 vacant seats were in Cove and Southwood, and Empress wards, where Liberal Democrat and Conservative councillors respectively stood down at the election.

50 candidates were standing including 4 from the British National Party and 1 from the Official Monster Raving Loony Party as well as candidates from the Conservatives, Liberal Democrats and Labour parties. The candidates included a 19-year-old Conservative in Heron Wood ward who was hoping to become the youngest ever councillor in Rushmoor.

Issues in the election included local developments, an increase in flights at Farnborough Airfield, the recent trial of alternate weekly rubbish collection, anti-social behaviour, spending cuts and councillors' expenses.

== Election result ==
The results saw the Conservatives stay in control of the council with 29 seats compared to 8 for the Liberal Democrats and 5 Labour. The Conservatives gained two seats from the Liberal Democrats in Cove and Southwood and West Heath wards to increase their majority. However the Liberal Democrats did take one seat back in St Marks ward defeating the Conservative councillor for the previous 10 years Nigel Baines. Meanwhile, in Heron Wood ward the Liberal Democrats gained a seat in Aldershot for the first time since 2006 after defeating the sitting Labour councillor. Labour easily held their only other seat in North Town, while narrowly failed to gain Wellington from the Conservatives by 50 votes; however Labour came last in all 9 wards in Farnborough.

Overall turnout was down from the 2007 election at 33.7% with the lowest turnout in Wellington ward at 19.8%. Following the election the Liberal Democrats elected a new group leader with Sue Gadsby taking over from Craig Card who had been party leader for the previous 9 years.

Rushmoor local election result 2008
Party	Seats	Gains	Losses	Net gain/loss	Seats %	Votes %	Votes	+/−
Conservative	11	2	1	+1	73.3	52.9	11,817	+4.3%
Liberal Democrats	3	2	2	0	20.0	29.9	6,664	-0.8%
Labour	1	0	1	-1	6.7	13.6	3,039	-1.2%
BNP	0	0	0	0	0	3.3	733	-0.8%
Monster Raving Loony	0	0	0	0	0	0.3	67	-0.2%

== Ward results ==
Cove & Southwood
Party	Candidate	Votes	%	±%
Conservative	Susan Carter	960	63.5	+9.7
Liberal Democrats	Anoop Verma	475	31.4	−9.1
Labour	Edward Shelton	77	5.1	−0.6
Majority		485	32.1	+18.8
Turnout		1,512	35.4	
Conservative gain from Liberal Democrats		Swing		

Empress
Party	Candidate	Votes	%	±%
Conservative	Gareth Lyon	1,158	68.1	+4.2
Liberal Democrats	Margaret Doubell	405	23.8	−2.9
Labour	Christopher Wright	138	8.1	−1.3
Majority		753	44.3	+7.1
Turnout		1,701	37.1	
Conservative hold		Swing		

Fernhill
Party	Candidate	Votes	%	±%
Conservative	John Marsh	906	65.3	+7.5
BNP	Cheryl Glass	200	14.4	−2.9
Liberal Democrats	Josephine Murphy	190	13.7	−4.7
Labour	Martin Coule	92	6.6	+0.1
Majority		706	50.9	+11.5
Turnout		1,388	33.7	
Conservative hold		Swing		

Grange
Party	Candidate	Votes	%	±%
Conservative	Steve Masterson	669	43.9	+6.2
Liberal Democrats	Philip Thompson	546	35.8	−4.9
BNP	Janette Brunning	179	11.7	−1.4
Labour	June Smith	130	8.5	0.0
Majority		123	8.1	
Turnout		1,524	37.3	
Conservative hold		Swing		

Heron Wood
Party	Candidate	Votes	%	±%
Liberal Democrats	Paul Bowers	564	41.8	+15.9
Labour	Terry Bridgeman	404	30.0	−9.0
Conservative	Simon Poole	380	28.2	−6.9
Majority		160	11.8	
Turnout		1,348	29.5	
Liberal Democrats gain from Labour		Swing		

Knellwood
Party	Candidate	Votes	%	±%
Conservative	Paul Taylor	1,153	69.8	+13.5
Liberal Democrats	Derek Purdey	395	23.9	+4.9
Labour	William Tootill	105	6.4	−1.2
Majority		758	45.9	+8.6
Turnout		1,653	39.3	
Conservative hold		Swing		

Manor Park
Party	Candidate	Votes	%	±%
Conservative	George Paparesti	869	61.7	+5.5
Liberal Democrats	Laura Kilburn	399	28.3	−4.8
Labour	Lesley Pestridge	140	9.9	−0.8
Majority		470	33.4	+10.2
Turnout		1,408	30.6	
Conservative hold		Swing		

Mayfield
Party	Candidate	Votes	%	±%
Liberal Democrats	Charlie Fraser-Fleming	491	44.4	−0.3
Conservative	Roderick Baulk	302	27.3	+2.8
BNP	Warren Glass	191	17.3	−0.2
Labour	Clive Grattan	123	11.1	−2.3
Majority		189	17.1	−3.1
Turnout		1,107	27.9	
Liberal Democrats hold		Swing		

North Town
Party	Candidate	Votes	%	±%
Labour	Sue Dibble	885	59.8	+3.2
Conservative	Sabaah Choudhary	446	30.1	+2.1
Liberal Democrats	Nick Burfield	149	10.1	−5.4
Majority		439	29.7	+1.1
Turnout		1,480	28.2	
Labour hold		Swing		

Rowhill
Party	Candidate	Votes	%	±%
Conservative	David Welch	928	67.4	+7.7
Liberal Democrats	Pete Pearson	217	15.8	−3.8
Labour	Jill Clark	164	11.9	−2.0
Monster Raving Loony	Professor Nabob	67	4.9	−1.9
Majority		711	51.7	+11.5
Turnout		1,376	33.1	
Conservative hold		Swing		

St John's (2)
Party	Candidate	Votes	%	±%
Conservative	Peter Moyle	1,005		
Conservative	Jacqui Vosper	934		
Liberal Democrats	Leola Card	631		
Liberal Democrats	Janet Gardner	621		
Labour	Sean Clarke	94		
Labour	Leslie Taylor	91		
Turnout		3,376	34.7	
Conservative hold		Swing		
Conservative hold		Swing		

St Mark's
Party	Candidate	Votes	%	±%
Liberal Democrats	Crispin Allard	984	53.9	+8.6
Conservative	Nigel Baines	741	40.6	−7.0
Labour	Barry Jones	100	5.5	−1.6
Majority		243	13.3	
Turnout		1,825	40.1	
Liberal Democrats gain from Conservative		Swing		

Wellington
Party	Candidate	Votes	%	±%
Conservative	Neil Watkin	461	47.1	−2.1
Labour	Alex Crawford	411	42.0	+3.0
Liberal Democrats	Peter Woodcock	107	10.9	−0.9
Majority		50	5.1	−5.2
Turnout		979	19.8	
Conservative hold		Swing		

West Heath
Party	Candidate	Votes	%	±%
Conservative	Steve Smith	905	55.1	+9.9
Liberal Democrats	Shaun Murphy	490	29.8	−7.3
BNP	Garry Brunning	163	9.9	−1.3
Labour	Philip Collins	85	5.2	−1.3
Majority		415	25.3	+17.2
Turnout		1,643	39.8	
Conservative gain from Liberal Democrats		Swing		

Preceded by 2007 Rushmoor Council election	Rushmoor local elections	Succeeded by 2010 Rushmoor Council election
