= 2018 Rushmoor Borough Council election =

2018 UK local government election

← 2016	3 May 2018	2019 →

14 seats of 39 to Rushmoor Borough Council 20 seats needed for a majority
	First party	Second party	Third party
Party	Conservative	Labour	Liberal Democrats
Seats before	25	11	0
Seats won	9	4	1
Seats after	25	11	1
Seat change	Steady	Steady	▲1
Popular vote	9,564	7,269	2,469
- Results by Ward
Council control before election
Conservative
Council control after election
Conservative

The 2018 Rushmoor Borough Council election took place on 3 May 2018 to elect members of Rushmoor Borough Council in England. This was on the same day as other local elections.

Two seats were up for election in the West Heath ward due to the resignation of an incumbent.

== Results summary ==
Rushmoor Borough Council election, 2018
Party	Seats	Gains	Losses	Net gain/loss	Seats %	Votes %	Votes	+/−
Conservative	9	1	1	0	64.3%	47.18%	9,564	+7.3%
Labour	4	0	0	0	28.6%	35.85%	7,269	+10.7%
Liberal Democrats	1	1	0	+1	7.1%	12.17%	2,469	+5%
UKIP	0	0	1	-1	0%	2.98%	606	-18.8%
Green	0	0	0	0	0%	1.50%	306	-4.2%
Union & Sovereignty	0	0	0	0	0%	0.28%	57	+0.3%

== Ward results ==
=== Aldershot Park ===
Aldershot Park 2018
Party	Candidate	Votes	%	±%
Labour	Terry Bridgeman	738	60.2	+14.3
Conservative	Len Winchcombe	488	39.8	+16.7
Majority		250	20.4	+1.9
Labour hold		Swing		

=== Cherrywood ===
Cherrywood 2018
Party	Candidate	Votes	%	±%
Labour	Ashley James Halstead	831	56.5	+12.6
Conservative	Peter James Cullum	515	35.0	+13.6
Liberal Democrats	Shaun Patrick Joseph Murphy	126	8.5	−
Majority		316	21.5	+3.9
Labour hold		Swing		

=== Cove and Southwood ===
Cove and Southwood 2018
Party	Candidate	Votes	%	±%
Conservative	Martin John Tennant	957	55.7	+7.1
Labour	Madi Jabbi	379	22.1	+8.3
Liberal Democrats	Alain Stephen Dekker	240	14.0	+4.0
UKIP	Jenny Parsons	142	8.3	−14.8
Majority		578	33.6	+8.1
Conservative hold		Swing		

=== Empress ===
Empress 2018
Party	Candidate	Votes	%	±%
Conservative	Mike Smith	784	49.6	+0.1
Labour	Bill O'Donovan	460	29.1	+16.6
Green	Donna Wallace	209	13.2	−12.9
Liberal Democrats	Leola Jane Card	127	8.0	+8.0
Majority		324	20.5	−2.9
Conservative hold		Swing		

=== Fernhill ===
Fernhill 2018
Party	Candidate	Votes	%	±%
Conservative	Ken Muschamp	1,039	68.4	+15.5
Labour	Mitchell Andrew Wescott	479	31.6	+14.9
Majority		560	36.8	+6.7
Conservative hold		Swing		

=== Knellwood ===
Knellwood 2018
Party	Candidate	Votes	%	±%
Conservative	Mara Martha Makunura	1,156	58.8	+0.6
Labour	Colin Frederick Southon	405	20.6	+6.6
Liberal Democrats	Nick March	404	20.6	+12.5
Majority		751	38.2	−6.0
Conservative hold		Swing		

=== Manor Park ===
Manor Park 2018
Party	Candidate	Votes	%	±%
Conservative	Bruce Alfred Thomas	977	50.4	+6.5
Labour	Gaynor Frances Austin	960	49.6	+25.6
Majority		17	0.8	−19.1
Conservative hold		Swing		

=== North Town ===
North Town 2018
Party	Candidate	Votes	%	±%
Labour	Frank Rust	998	68.7	−
Conservative	Akmal Hussain Gani	358	24.6	+6.6
Green	Jason Harry Guy	97	6.7	+6.7
Majority		640	44.1	−6.6
Labour hold		Swing		

=== Rowhill ===
Rowhill 2018
Party	Candidate	Votes	%	±%
Conservative	Sophia Choudhary	829	46.2	+4.9
Labour	Yvette Catherine Dean	583	32.5	+7.6
Liberal Democrats	Alan Hilliar	381	21.2	+21.2
Majority		246	13.7	−1.4
Conservative hold		Swing		

=== St John’s ===
St John’s 2018
Party	Candidate	Votes	%	±%
Conservative	Jacqui Vosper	878	64.4	+19.8
Labour	Janet Gardner	304	22.3	+4.0
Liberal Democrats	Jill Whyman	180	13.2	+5.4
Majority		575	42.1	+26.8
Conservative hold		Swing		

=== St Mark’s ===
St Mark’s 2018
Party	Candidate	Votes	%	±%
Liberal Democrats	Abul Koher Chowdhury	577	39.0	+10.9
Conservative	Dave Gladstone	544	36.8	−2.4
Labour	Carl Robert Hewitt	301	20.4	+6.4
Union & Sovereignty	Zack Culshaw	57	3.9	+3.9
Majority		33	2.2	
Liberal Democrats gain from Conservative		Swing	6.7	

=== Wellington ===
Wellington 2018
Party	Candidate	Votes	%	±%
Labour	Nadia Noelle Martin	389	52.4	−10.6
Conservative	Attika Choudhary	290	39.0	+7.9
Liberal Democrats	Sophie Elizabeth Oglesson	64	8.6	+2.7
Majority		99	13.4	−18.5
Labour hold		Swing		

=== West Heath ===
West Heath 2018 (2)
Party	Candidate	Votes	%	±%
Conservative	Rod Cooper	749	40.2	+16.8
Conservative	Veronica Mary Graham-Green	712	38.3	+14.9
UKIP	Chris Harding	464	24.9	−27.3
Labour	Jeremy Audsley Clapham	442	23.8	+10.6
Labour	June Smith	399	21.4	+8.2
Liberal Democrats	Craig William Card	370	19.9	+13.5
Liberal Democrats	Charlie Fraser-Fleming	348	18.7	+12.3
Majority		248	13.4	
Conservative hold		Swing		
Conservative gain from UKIP		Swing		
