= 2007 Rushmoor Borough Council election =

2007 UK local government election

Map of the results of the 2007 Rushmoor council election. Conservatives in blue, Liberal Democrats in yellow and Labour in red.

The 2007 Rushmoor Council election took place on 3 May 2007 to elect members of Rushmoor Borough Council in Hampshire, England. One third of the council was up for election and the Conservative Party stayed in overall control of the council.

After the election, the composition of the council was:

- Conservative 28
- Liberal Democrat 8
- Labour 5
- Independent 1

== Campaign ==
Before the election the Conservatives held 26 seats, the Liberal Democrats 10, Labour 5 and 1 independent. 14 seats were being contested with candidates from the three main parties on the council, as well as four from the British National Party, 1 Official Monster Raving Loony Party and one independent.

Issues in the election included the recent introduction of alternate weekly collection of rubbish and recycling, town centre redevelopments, council tax and anti-social behaviour. Another issue that arose during the campaign was the responsibility for a new play area in North Town, Aldershot, with different parties claiming the credit.

Rushmoor saw a trial of internet voting with votes able to be cast this way in the week before the election. 6,600 voters had registered to vote online as well as 5,500 who had opted to vote by post. When the online voting opened however there was a problem with the Conservative candidate in Wellington ward being placed against the Labour emblem, but this was spotted and corrected sufficiently quickly that the candidates accepted that the result had not been compromised.

== Election result ==
The results saw the Conservatives keep control of the council with an increased majority after gaining 2 seats from the Liberal Democrats. The Conservatives gained in Cove and Southwood by 226 votes and in West Heath by 144 votes to hold 28 of the 42 seats. The Liberal Democrats defended the other 2 seats they had held, after coming closest to gaining a seat in St Mark's ward where the Conservatives had a majority of 40. Labour held their 2 seats, while an independent who had campaigned against alternate week refuse collection was well beaten in Knellwood by Conservative Roland Dibbs who won 56% of the vote.

The trial of internet voting failed to increase turnout, which dropped to 35.2% from the 36% in the 2006 election. In total 3,827 of the 6,686 people registered to vote online did so, 57.2%, with disagreement over whether the trial was a success.

Following the election the only independent councillor, Peter Sandy, resigned from the council causing a by-election in Heron Wood ward.

Rushmoor local election result 2007
Party	Seats	Gains	Losses	Net gain/loss	Seats %	Votes %	Votes	+/−
Conservative	10	2	0	+2	71.4	48.6	10,394	+2.9%
Liberal Democrats	2	0	2	-2	14.3	30.7	6,553	+0.3%
Labour	2	0	0	0	14.3	14.8	3,169	+0.2%
BNP	0	0	0	0	0	4.1	867	+0.5%
Independent	0	0	0	0	0	1.3	288	-1.7%
Monster Raving Loony	0	0	0	0	0	0.5	103	+0.2%

== Ward results ==
Cove & Southwood
Party	Candidate	Votes	%	±%
Conservative	Alan Chainey	915	53.8	+0.3
Liberal Democrats	Anoop Verma	689	40.5	+6.3
Labour	Edward Shelton	97	5.7	−1.3
Majority		226	13.3	−5.9
Turnout		1,701		
Conservative gain from Liberal Democrats		Swing		

Empress
Party	Candidate	Votes	%	±%
Conservative	Brian Parker	1,150	63.9	+0.1
Liberal Democrats	Toby Smith	480	26.7	−1.7
Labour	Christopher Wright	169	9.4	+1.6
Majority		670	37.2	+1.8
Turnout		1,799		
Conservative hold		Swing		

Fernhill
Party	Candidate	Votes	%	±%
Conservative	Kenneth Muschamp	844	57.8	+1.7
Liberal Democrats	Josephine Murphy	269	18.4	−7.0
BNP	Cheryl Glass	252	17.3	−1.2
Labour	Martin Coule	95	6.5	+6.5
Majority		575	39.4	+8.7
Turnout		1,460		
Conservative hold		Swing		

Grange
Party	Candidate	Votes	%	±%
Liberal Democrats	Hazel Manning	614	40.7	+16.2
Conservative	Jacqueline Vosper	568	37.7	−7.2
BNP	Janette Brunning	198	13.1	−3.8
Labour	Clive Grattan	128	8.5	−5.2
Majority		46	3.0	
Turnout		1,508		
Liberal Democrats hold		Swing		

Heron Wood
Party	Candidate	Votes	%	±%
Labour	Donald Cappleman	501	39.0	+2.0
Conservative	Bruce Thomas	451	35.1	+7.9
Liberal Democrats	Ian Colpus	332	25.9	−3.4
Majority		50	3.9	−3.8
Turnout		1,284		
Labour hold		Swing		

Knellwood
Party	Candidate	Votes	%	±%
Conservative	Roland Dibbs	950	56.3	+10.0
Liberal Democrats	Abu Bakar	320	19.0	+2.3
Independent	Keith Parkins	288	17.1	−13.6
Labour	William Tootill	129	7.6	+1.3
Majority		630	37.3	+21.6
Turnout		1,687		
Conservative hold		Swing		

Manor Park
Party	Candidate	Votes	%	±%
Conservative	Peter Crerar	888	56.2	+7.9
Liberal Democrats	Phillip Thompson	522	33.1	+1.9
Labour	Lesley Pestridge	169	10.7	+2.0
Majority		366	23.2	+6.1
Turnout		1,579		
Conservative hold		Swing		

Mayfield
Party	Candidate	Votes	%	±%
Liberal Democrats	Neville Dewey	558	44.7	−1.8
Conservative	Stephen Smith	306	24.5	+1.9
BNP	Warren Glass	218	17.5	−2.7
Labour	June Smith	167	13.4	+2.7
Majority		252	20.2	−3.7
Turnout		1,249		
Liberal Democrats hold		Swing		

North Town
Party	Candidate	Votes	%	±%
Labour	Peter Rust	775	56.6	−0.9
Conservative	Sabaah Choudhary	383	28.0	−1.2
Liberal Democrats	Laura Kilburn	212	15.5	−8.2
Majority		392	28.6	+0.3
Turnout		1,370		
Labour hold		Swing		

Rowhill
Party	Candidate	Votes	%	±%
Conservative	Mohammad Choudhary	907	59.7	−1.2
Liberal Democrats	Peter Pearson	297	19.6	+3.3
Labour	Jill Clark	211	13.9	+1.8
Monster Raving Loony	Robert Stanton	103	6.8	+3.1
Majority		610	40.2	−4.3
Turnout		1,518		
Conservative hold		Swing		

St John's
Party	Candidate	Votes	%	±%
Conservative	Graham Tucker	931	53.2	+11.3
Liberal Democrats	Leola Card	712	40.7	−10.4
Labour	Mary Lawrance	108	6.2	−0.8
Majority		219	12.5	
Turnout		1,751		
Conservative hold		Swing		

St Mark's
Party	Candidate	Votes	%	±%
Conservative	Diane Bedford	816	47.6	+6.7
Liberal Democrats	Crispin Allard	776	45.3	−3.5
Labour	Barry Jones	121	7.1	−3.2
Majority		40	2.3	
Turnout		1,713		
Conservative hold		Swing		

Wellington
Party	Candidate	Votes	%	±%
Conservative	Francis Williams	485	49.2	+4.6
Labour	Alexander Crawford	384	39.0	+4.3
Liberal Democrats	John Campagnoli	116	11.8	−1.1
Majority		101	10.3	+0.4
Turnout		985		
Conservative hold		Swing		

West Heath
Party	Candidate	Votes	%	±%
Conservative	Mark Staplehurst	800	45.2	−1.3
Liberal Democrats	Shaun Murphy	656	37.1	−8.6
BNP	Gary Brunning	199	11.2	+11.2
Labour	Phillip Collins	115	6.5	−1.4
Majority		144	8.1	+7.3
Turnout		1,770		
Conservative gain from Liberal Democrats		Swing		

Preceded by 2006 Rushmoor Council election	Rushmoor local elections	Succeeded by 2008 Rushmoor Council election
