= 2023 Rushmoor Borough Council election =

2023 local government election in Rushmoor

← 2022	4 May 2023	2024 →

13 of 39 seats to Rushmoor Borough Council 20 seats needed for a majority

	First party	Second party	Third party
Leader	David Clifford	Christine Guinness	Craig Card
Party	Conservative	Labour	Liberal Democrats
Seats before	28	9	2
Seats after	23	14	2
Seat change	▼5	▲5	Steady
- The winner of each seat by party in the 2023 Rushmoor Borough Council Election
Leader before election
David Clifford
Conservative
Leader after election
David Clifford
Conservative

The 2023 Rushmoor Borough Council election took place on 4 May 2023 to elect councillors to Rushmoor Borough Council in Hampshire, England. This was on the same date as other local elections across England. A third of the council was up for election.

The council was under Conservative majority control prior to the election. The Conservatives lost five seats to Labour at the election, but retained a majority of the seats.

== Results summary ==
2023 Rushmoor Borough Council election
Party	This election			Full council			This election		
Party	Seats	Net	Seats %	Other	Total	Total %	Votes	Votes %	+/−
Labour	8	▲5		6	14		9,886	46.9	
Conservative	4	▼5		20	23		7,832	37.1	
Liberal Democrats	1	Steady		1	2		2,997	14.2	
Green	0	Steady		0	0	0.0	194	1.00	
Heritage	0	Steady		0	0	0.0	115	0.5	
Reform UK	0	Steady		0	0	0.0	82	0.4	
TUSC	0	Steady		0	0	0.0	22	0.1	

== Ward results ==
The results for each ward were as follows:

The changes in these results are changes from the 2022 Rushmoor Borough Council election.

=== Aldershot Park ===
Aldershot Park
Party	Candidate	Votes	%	±%
Labour	Sophie Porter	987	72.0	+12.1
Conservative	David Anthony Armitage	298	21.8	−18.3
Liberal Democrats	Sam Morrell	85	6.2	New
Majority		689	50.2	+16.5
Labour hold		Swing		

=== Cherrywood ===
Cherrywood
Party	Candidate	Votes	%	±%
Labour	Christine Avril Guinness	994	67.9	+9.9
Conservative	Suman Pun	470	32.1	−9.9
Majority		524	35.8	+11.2
Labour hold		Swing		

=== Cove and Southwood ===
Cove and Southwood
Party	Candidate	Votes	%	±%
Conservative	Steve Masterson	794	48.2	−16.7
Labour	Kieran James Grinter	489	29.7	+9.0
Liberal Democrats	Emily Rebecca Mitchell	246	14.9	+0.4
Green	Paul Andrew Cawsey	117	7.1	New
Majority		305	18.5	−10.4
Conservative hold		Swing		

=== Empress ===
Empress
Party	Candidate	Votes	%	±%
Labour	Gareth Idris Williams	707	40.3	+8.1
Conservative	Helen Dale	593	33.8	−12.8
Liberal Democrats	Leola Jane Card	372	21.2	+0.1
Reform UK	Ian Michael Brumwell Simpson	82	4.7	New
Majority		114	6.5	
Labour gain from Conservative		Swing		

=== Fernhill ===
Fernhill
Party	Candidate	Votes	%	±%
Labour	Abe Michael Terry Allen	822	52.8	+14.7
Conservative	Len Amos	583	37.5	−13.2
Liberal Democrats	Jill Whyman	151	9.7	−11.3
Majority		239	15.3	
Labour gain from Conservative		Swing		

=== Knellwood ===
Knellwood
Party	Candidate	Votes	%	±%
Conservative	Calum James Stuart	863	38.6	−11.5
Labour	Tad Cragg	636	28.4	+6.6
Liberal Democrats	Mark Trotter	623	27.8	−0.2
Heritage	Kevin Robert Joyce	115	5.1	New
Majority		227	10.2	−14.2
Conservative hold		Swing		

=== Manor Park ===
Manor Park
Party	Candidate	Votes	%	±%
Labour	Becky Williams	1,103	54.5	+13.1
Conservative	Peter Crerar	921	45.5	−0.3
Majority		182	9.0	
Labour gain from Conservative		Swing		

=== North Town ===
North Town
Party	Candidate	Votes	%	±%
Labour	Gaynor Frances Austin	1,022	73.5	+3.7
Conservative	Dick Brown	301	21.7	−8.5
Liberal Democrats	Glenn Alexander Christodoulou	67	4.8	New
Majority		721	51.8	+26.8
Labour hold		Swing		

=== Rowhill ===
Rowhill
Party	Candidate	Votes	%	±%
Labour	Halleh Koohestani	866	48.7	+10.7
Conservative	Adrian Robert Newell	660	37.1	−3.4
Liberal Democrats	Alan Richard Hilliar	254	14.3	−7.1
Majority		206	11.6	
Labour gain from Conservative		Swing		

=== St John's ===
St John’s
Party	Candidate	Votes	%	±%
Conservative	Peter James Gordan Edward McGready Cullum	747	45.4	−8.2
Labour	Julia Louise Warner	733	44.6	−1.7
Liberal Democrats	Olive Jane O'Dowd-Booth	165	10.0	New
Majority		14	0.8	−44.0
Conservative hold		Swing		

=== St Mark's ===
St Mark’s
Party	Candidate	Votes	%	±%
Liberal Democrats	Thomas William Mitchell	774	48.5	+4.0
Conservative	Abul Koher Chowdhury	554	34.7	−5.9
Labour	Barry Jones	268	16.8	+2.0
Majority		220	13.8	+4.3
Liberal Democrats hold		Swing		

=== Wellington ===
Wellington
Party	Candidate	Votes	%	±%
Labour	Dhan Bahadur Sarki	652	56.5	+28.2
Conservative	Mary Ann Hartley	414	35.9	−16.4
Liberal Democrats	Aidan David Lunn	66	5.7	−13.5
TUSC	Ryan Christopher Lyddall	22	1.9	New
Majority		238	20.6	
Labour gain from Conservative		Swing		

=== West Heath ===
West Heath
Party	Candidate	Votes	%	±%
Conservative	Gareth Benjamin Lyon	634	41.9	+10.5
Labour	Gavin Raymond Francis	607	40.1	+25.2
Liberal Democrats	Charlie Fraser-Fleming	194	12.8	−1.4
Green	Edward John Neville	77	5.1	New
Majority		27	1.8	−4.1
Conservative hold		Swing		
