= 2011 Rushmoor Borough Council election =

2011 UK local government election

The 2011 Rushmoor Borough Council election was held on Thursday 5 May 2011 to elect 14 members to Rushmoor Borough Council, the same day as other local elections in the United Kingdom. It elected one-third of the council's 42 members to a four-year term. It was preceded by the 2010 election and followed by the 2012 election. The Conservative Party held control of the council after the election. Turnout across the council was 38.7%.

== Results summary ==
2011 Rushmoor Borough Council election
Party	This election			Full council			This election		
Party	Seats	Net	Seats %	Other	Total	Total %	Votes	Votes %	+/−
Conservative	12	▲2	85.7	20	32	76.2	13,627	54.2	▲5.5
Labour	2	Steady	14.3	4	6	14.3	6,081	24.2	▲9.3
Liberal Democrats	0	▼2	0.0	4	4	9.5	4,761	18.9	▼11.7
UKIP	0	New	0.0	0	0	0.0	502	2.0	New
Independent	0	Steady	0.0	0	0	0.0	113	0.4	▼0.9
Christian	0	New	0.0	0	0	0.0	75	0.3	New

== Ward results ==
=== Cove and Southwood ===
Cove and Southwood
Party	Candidate	Votes	%	±%
Conservative	Alan Chainey*	1,226	63.8	▲10.0
Liberal Democrats	Julia Ohkubo	287	14.9	▼25.6
Labour	Edward Shelton	238	12.4	▲6.7
UKIP	Jane Shattock	171	8.9	New
Majority		939	48.9	▲35.6
Total valid votes		1,922	43.7	
Turnout			43.9	
Registered electors		4,400		
Conservative hold		Swing	▲17.8	

=== Empress ===
Empress
Party	Candidate	Votes	%	±%
Conservative	Brian Parker*	1,412	60.5	▼3.4
Liberal Democrats	Stephen Chowns	508	21.8	▼4.9
Labour	Christopher Wright	414	17.7	▲8.3
Majority		904	38.7	▲1.5
Total valid votes		2,334	44.7	
Turnout			45.0	
Registered electors		5,220		
Conservative hold		Swing	▲0.7	

=== Fernhill ===
Fernhill
Party	Candidate	Votes	%	±%
Conservative	Ken Muschamp*	1,068	66.4	▲8.6
Liberal Democrats	Shaun Murphy	294	18.3	▼0.1
Labour	Martin Coule	246	15.3	▲8.8
Majority		774	48.1	▲8.8
Total valid votes		1,608	38.1	
Turnout			38.3	
Registered electors		4,223		
Conservative hold		Swing	▲4.4	

=== Grange ===
Grange
Party	Candidate	Votes	%	±%
Conservative	Jackie Hammond	803	48.9	▲11.2
Liberal Democrats	Hazel Manning*	485	29.5	▼11.2
Labour	Barry Jones	354	21.6	▲13.1
Majority		318	19.4	N/A
Total valid votes		1,642	38.8	
Registered electors		4,231		
Conservative gain from Liberal Democrats		Swing	▲11.2	

=== Heron Wood ===
Heron Wood
Party	Candidate	Votes	%	±%
Labour	Don Cappleman*	697	45.2	▲6.2
Conservative	Dan Hougham	604	39.1	▲4.0
Liberal Democrats	Roland Collins	242	15.7	▼10.2
Majority		93	6.0	▲2.1
Total valid votes		1,543	33.1	
Turnout			33.3	
Registered electors		4,656		
Labour hold		Swing	▲1.1	

=== Knellwood ===
Knellwood
Party	Candidate	Votes	%	±%
Conservative	Roland Dibbs*	1,377	64.2	▲7.9
Labour	Bill Tootill	391	18.2	▲10.6
Liberal Democrats	Abul Koher Chowdhury	376	17.5	▼1.4
Majority		986	46.0	▲8.6
Total valid votes		2,144	46.5	
Turnout			46.6	
Registered electors		4,614		
Conservative hold		Swing	▼1.3	

=== Manor Park ===
Manor Park
Party	Candidate	Votes	%	±%
Conservative	Peter Crerar*	1,138	56.8	▲0.6
Labour	Lesley Pestridge	407	20.3	▲9.6
Liberal Democrats	Philip Thompson	282	14.1	▼19.0
UKIP	Eddie Poole	176	8.8	New
Majority		731	36.5	▲13.3
Total valid votes		2,003	42.5	
Rejected ballots				
Turnout			42.7	
Registered electors		4,714		
Conservative hold		Swing	▼4.5	

=== Mayfield ===
Mayfield
Party	Candidate	Votes	%	±%
Conservative	Derek Cornwell	425	32.4	▲7.9
Liberal Democrats	Neville Dewey*	325	24.8	▼19.9
Labour	Leslie Taylor	292	22.3	▲8.9
UKIP	Albert Buddle	155	11.8	New
Independent	Thomas Hewitt	113	8.6	New
Majority		100	7.6	N/A
Total valid votes		1,310	32.0	
Turnout			32.1	
Registered electors		4,100		
Conservative gain from Liberal Democrats		Swing	▲13.9	

=== North Town ===
North Town
Party	Candidate	Votes	%	±%
Labour	Frank Rust*	1,091	62.7	▲6.1
Conservative	Mark Trotter	650	37.3	▲9.4
Majority		441	25.3	▼3.3
Total valid votes		1,741	32.3	
Turnout			32.6	
Registered electors		5,398		
Labour hold		Swing	▼1.6	

=== Rowhill ===
Rowhill
Party	Candidate	Votes	%	±%
Conservative	Charles Choudhary*	1,027	57.0	▼2.8
Labour	Jill Clark	480	26.6	▲12.7
Liberal Democrats	CK Nam	295	16.4	▼3.2
Majority		547	30.4	▼9.8
Total valid votes		1,802	43.0	
Turnout			43.5	
Registered electors		4,195		
Conservative hold		Swing	▼7.7	

=== St. John's ===
St. John's
Party	Candidate	Votes	%	±%
Conservative	Jacqui Vosper	1,226	60.1	▲7.0
Labour	Clive Grattan	407	20.0	▲13.8
Liberal Democrats	Simon Burfield	406	19.9	▼20.8
Majority		819	40.2	▲27.7
Total valid votes		2,039	39.2	
Registered electors		5,197		
Conservative hold		Swing	▼3.4	

=== St. Mark's ===
St. Mark's
Party	Candidate	Votes	%	±%
Conservative	Diane Bedford*	934	49.4	▲1.7
Liberal Democrats	Sue Gadsby	620	32.8	▼12.5
Labour	Sean Clarke	263	13.9	▲6.8
Christian	Juliana Brimicombe	75	4.0	New
Majority		314	16.6	▲14.3
Total valid votes		1,892	37.6	
Turnout			37.8	
Registered electors		5,032		
Conservative hold		Swing	▲7.1	

=== Wellington ===
Wellington
Party	Candidate	Votes	%	±%
Conservative	Attika Choudhary	556	42.3	▼6.9
Labour	Susan Wines	484	36.9	▼2.1
Liberal Democrats	Michelle Manning	273	20.8	▲9.0
Majority		72	5.5	▼4.8
Total valid votes		1,313	23.6	
Turnout			23.8	
Registered electors		5,563		
Conservative hold		Swing	▼2.4	

=== Westheath ===
Westheath
Party	Candidate	Votes	%	±%
Conservative	Mark Staplehurst*	1,181	63.3	▲18.1
Liberal Democrats	Josephine Murphy	368	19.7	▼17.3
Labour	Philip Collins	317	17.0	▲10.5
Majority		813	43.6	▲35.4
Total valid votes		1,866	45.6	
Registered electors		4,095		
Conservative hold		Swing	▲17.7	
