= 2015 Rushmoor Borough Council election =

2015 UK local government election

- 7 May 2015

14 seats of 39 to Rushmoor Borough Council 20 seats needed for a majority
	First party	Second party	Third party
Party	Conservative	Labour	UKIP
Seats before	24	12	3
Seats won	10	3	1
Seats after	25	11	3
Seat change	▲1	▼1	Steady
Popular vote	19,353	9,644	8,278
- Results by Ward
Council control before election
Conservative
Council control after election
Conservative

The 2015 Rushmoor Borough Council election took place on 7 May 2015 to elect members of the Rushmoor Borough Council in England. It was held on the same day as other local elections.

Two seats were up for election in the West Heath ward due to the resignation of an incumbent.

== Results ==
Rushmoor local election result 2015
Party	Seats	Gains	Losses	Net gain/loss	Seats %	Votes %	Votes	+/−
Conservative	10	1	0	▲1	71.42	46.32	19,353	
Labour	3	0	1	▼1	21.42	23.08	9,644	
UKIP	1	0	0	Steady	7.14	19.81	8,278	
Green	0	0	0	Steady		6.35	2,655	
Liberal Democrats				Steady		4.21	1,759	
Christian				Steady		0.20	86	

== Ward results ==
=== Aldershot Park ===
Aldershot Park
Party	Candidate	Votes	%	±%
Conservative	Adrian Newell	1,153	37.70	
Labour	Frances Matthews	1,065	34.82	
UKIP	Peter Courtney	840	27.46	
Majority		88	2.87	
Turnout		3,058		
Conservative gain from Labour		Swing		

=== Cherrywood ===
Cherrywood
Party	Candidate	Votes	%	±%
Labour	Barry Jones	1,050	36.25	
Conservative	Mara Makunura	804	27.76	
UKIP	Simon Austridge	791	27.31	
Liberal Democrats	Shaun Murphy	251	8.66	
Majority		246	8.49	
Turnout		2,896		
Labour hold		Swing		

=== Cove and Southwood ===
Cove and Southwood
Party	Candidate	Votes	%	±%
Conservative	Stephen Masterson	1,992	55.07	
UKIP	Jennifer Parsons	813	22.47	
Labour	Clive Andrews	543	15.01	
Green	Vincent Warne	269	7.43	
Majority		1,179	32.59	
Turnout		3,617		
Conservative hold		Swing		

=== Empress ===
Empress
Party	Candidate	Votes	%	±%
Conservative	Gareth Lyon	1,904	61.57	
Green	Donna Wallace	518	16.75	
Labour	Philip Collins	405	13.09	
Liberal Democrats	Julia Ohkubo	265	8.57	
Majority		1,386	44.82	
Turnout		3,092		
Conservative hold		Swing		

=== Fernhill ===
Fernhill
Party	Candidate	Votes	%	±%
Conservative	John Marsh	1,686	49.09	
UKIP	William Walker	800	23.29	
Labour	Leonard Amos	498	14.50	
Liberal Democrats	Charles Fraser-Fleming	261	7.60	
Green	Martin Coule	189	5.50	
Majority		886	25.80	
Turnout		3,434		
Conservative hold		Swing		

=== Knellwood ===
Knellwood
Party	Candidate	Votes	%	±%
Conservative	Roland Dibbs	2,367	58.20	
Labour	William Tootill	645	15.85	
UKIP	Rosemary Bell	590	14.50	
Green	Amy Lewry	465	11.43	
Majority		1,722	42.34	
Turnout		4,067		
Conservative hold		Swing		

=== Manor Park ===
Manor Park
Party	Candidate	Votes	%	±%
Conservative	Peter Crerar	1,805	49.07	
Labour	Dominique Swaddling	1,129	30.69	
UKIP	Edmund Poole	744	20.22	
Majority		676	18.37	
Turnout		3,678		
Conservative hold		Swing		

=== North Town ===
North Town
Party	Candidate	Votes	%	±%
Labour	Susan Dibble	1,423	48.73	
Conservative	Lee Dawson	911	31.19	
UKIP	Adam de Lecq le Gresley	586	20.06	
Majority		512	17.53	
Turnout		2,920		
Conservative hold		Swing		

=== Rowhill ===
Rowhill
Party	Candidate	Votes	%	±%
Conservative	Mohammad Choudhary	1,443	42.00	
UKIP	Kevin Betsworth	936	27.24	
Labour	Jill Clark	708	20.61	
Green	Peta Howell	348	10.13	
Majority		507	14.75	
Turnout		3,435		
Conservative hold		Swing		

=== St John's ===
St John's
Party	Candidate	Votes	%	±%
Conservative	Barba Hurst	1,870	54.40	
UKIP	Christopher Harding	844	24.55	
Labour	Peter Hayward	507	14.75	
Green	David Stephenson	216	6.28	
Majority		1,026	29.85	
Turnout		3,437		
Conservative hold		Swing		

=== St Mark's ===
St Mark's
Party	Candidate	Votes	%	±%
Conservative	Elizabeth Corps	1,619	50.24	
Liberal Democrats	Abul Koher Chowdhury	663	20.57	
Labour	Colin Southon	536	16.63	
Green	Carl Hewitt	404	12.53	
Majority		956	29.67	
Turnout		3,222		
Conservative hold		Swing		

=== Wellington ===
Wellington
Party	Candidate	Votes	%	±%
Labour	Jennifer Evans	645	48.45	
Conservative	Attika Choudhary	600	45.07	
Christian	Kelebogile Waynereid	86	6.46	
Majority		45	3.38	
Turnout		1,331		
Labour hold		Swing		

=== West Heath ===
West Heath (2)
Party	Candidate	Votes	%	±%
UKIP	David Bell	1,334	37.17	
Conservative	Rodney Cooper	1,199	33.41	
Conservative	Stephen Smith	1,173		
UKIP	Derek Cornwell	1,101	30.68	
Labour	Janet Gardner	490	13.65	
Labour	Trevor Simpson	417		
Liberal Democrats	Josephine Murphy	319	8.89	
Liberal Democrats	Philip Thompson	273		
Green	Paula Marshall	246	6.85	
UKIP win (new seat)				
Conservative win (new seat)				
