= 2010 Rushmoor Borough Council election =

2010 UK local government election

Map of the results by ward

The 2010 Rushmoor Council election took place on 6 May 2010 to elect members of Rushmoor Borough Council in Hampshire, England. One third of the council was up for election and the Conservative Party stayed in overall control of the council.

After the election, the composition of the council was:

- Conservative 30
- Liberal Democrat 6
- Labour 6

== Election result ==
The results saw the Conservatives retain control of the council after winning 10 of the 14 seats contested, compared to 2 each for the Liberal Democrat and Labour parties. The Conservatives gained one seat from the Liberal Democrats in Farnborough and regained another from the United Kingdom Independence Party (UKIP) where the former councillor had defected from the Conservatives to UKIP. Among the winners was the first Asian woman to be elected to Rushmoor council, Sophia Choudhary, who won for the Conservatives in Rowhill ward.

Rushmoor local election result 2010
Party	Seats	Gains	Losses	Net gain/loss	Seats %	Votes %	Votes	+/−
Conservative	10	2	0	+2	71.4	45.0	18,300	-7.9%
Liberal Democrats	2	0	1	-1	14.3	35.3	14,354	+5.4%
Labour	2	0	0	0	14.3	15.9	6,459	+2.3%
Independent	0	0	0	0	0	1.7	681	+1.7%
UKIP	0	0	1	-1	0	1.6	670	+1.6%
English Independence Party	0	0	0	0	0	0.5	194	+0.5%

== Ward results ==
Cove & Southwood
Party	Candidate	Votes	%	±%
Conservative	Martin Tennant	1,694	57.5	−6.0
Liberal Democrats	Josephine Murphy	967	32.8	+1.4
Labour	Edward Shelton	285	9.7	+4.6
Majority		727	24.7	−7.4
Turnout		2,946	67.6	+32.2
Conservative hold		Swing		

Empress
Party	Candidate	Votes	%	±%
Conservative	David Clifford	1,844	53.5	−14.6
Liberal Democrats	Derek Wickens	1,206	35.0	+11.2
Labour	Christopher Wright	397	11.5	+3.4
Majority		638	18.5	−25.8
Turnout		3,447	69.0	+31.9
Conservative hold		Swing		

Fernhill
Party	Candidate	Votes	%	±%
Conservative	Alan Ferrier	1,521	55.9	−9.4
Liberal Democrats	Simon Burfield	850	31.3	+17.6
Labour	Martin Coule	349	12.8	+6.2
Majority		671	24.7	−26.2
Turnout		2,720	64.9	+31.2
Conservative hold		Swing		

Grange
Party	Candidate	Votes	%	±%
Conservative	Mike Smith	1,227	46.0	+2.1
Liberal Democrats	Philip Thompson	1,071	40.2	+4.4
Labour	June Smith	368	13.8	+5.3
Majority		156	5.9	−2.2
Turnout		2,666	63.8	+26.5
Conservative hold		Swing		

Heron Wood
Party	Candidate	Votes	%	±%
Labour	Mike Roberts	810	30.6	+0.6
Liberal Democrats	Nick Burfield	742	28.1	−13.7
Conservative	Attika Choudhary	740	28.0	−0.2
Independent	Peter Sandy	353	13.3	+13.3
Majority		68	2.5	
Turnout		2,645	56.7	+27.2
Labour hold		Swing		

Knellwood
Party	Candidate	Votes	%	±%
Conservative	Adam Jackman	1,621	51.1	−18.7
Liberal Democrats	Abul Koher Chowdhury	1,030	32.5	+8.6
Labour	Bill Tootill	304	9.6	+3.2
UKIP	Albert Buddle	219	6.9	+6.9
Majority		591	18.6	−27.3
Turnout		3,174	71.0	+31.7
Conservative hold		Swing		

Manor Park
Party	Candidate	Votes	%	±%
Conservative	Ron Hughes	1,427	45.3	−16.4
Liberal Democrats	Ian Colpus	1,102	35.0	+6.7
Labour	Lesley Pestridge	397	12.6	+2.7
UKIP	Jane Shattock	221	7.0	+7.0
Majority		325	10.3	−23.1
Turnout		3,147	67.6	+37.0
Conservative gain from UKIP		Swing		

Mayfield
Party	Candidate	Votes	%	±%
Liberal Democrats	Mike Manning	965	43.9	−0.5
Conservative	Lucy Kurzeja	740	33.7	+6.4
Labour	Leslie Taylor	324	14.7	+3.6
Independent	Thomas Hewitt	170	7.7	+7.7
Majority		225	10.2	−6.9
Turnout		2,199	54.6	+26.7
Liberal Democrats hold		Swing		

North Town
Party	Candidate	Votes	%	±%
Labour	Keith Dibble	1,467	46.1	−13.7
Conservative	Mark Trotter	1,007	31.6	+1.5
Liberal Democrats	Peter Woodcock	710	22.3	+12.2
Majority		460	14.4	−15.3
Turnout		3,184	58.7	+30.5
Labour hold		Swing		

Rowhill
Party	Candidate	Votes	%	±%
Conservative	Sophia Choudhary	1,125	40.9	−26.5
Liberal Democrats	Pete Pearson	918	33.4	+17.6
Labour	Jill Clark	321	11.7	−0.2
UKIP	Eddie Poole	230	8.4	+8.4
Independent	Tom Harley	158	5.7	+5.7
Majority		207	7.5	−44.2
Turnout		2,752	66.3	+33.2
Conservative hold		Swing		

St John's
Party	Candidate	Votes	%	±%
Conservative	Barbara Hurst	1,574	46.5	
Liberal Democrats	Sue Gadsby	1,528	45.1	
Labour	Clive Grattan	284	8.4	
Majority		46	1.4	
Turnout		3,386	65.3	+30.6
Conservative gain from Liberal Democrats		Swing		

St Mark's
Party	Candidate	Votes	%	±%
Liberal Democrats	Alistair Mackie	1,450	48.1	−5.8
Conservative	Elizabeth Corps	1,266	42.0	+1.4
Labour	Sean Clarke	296	9.8	+4.3
Majority		184	6.1	−7.2
Turnout		3,012	61.6	+21.5
Liberal Democrats hold		Swing		

Wellington
Party	Candidate	Votes	%	±%
Conservative	Eric Neal	1,081	42.6	−4.5
Liberal Democrats	Mitch Manning	896	35.3	+24.4
Labour	Sam Wines	562	22.1	−19.9
Majority		185	7.3	+2.2
Turnout		2,539	45.8	+26.0
Conservative hold		Swing		

West Heath
Party	Candidate	Votes	%	±%
Conservative	Dave Thomas	1,433	50.4	−4.7
Liberal Democrats	Shaun Murphy	919	32.3	+2.5
Labour	Philip Collins	295	10.4	+5.2
English Independence Party	Gary Cowd	194	6.8	+6.8
Majority		514	18.1	−7.2
Turnout		2,841	70.1	+30.3
Conservative hold		Swing		

Preceded by 2008 Rushmoor Council election	Rushmoor local elections	Succeeded by 2011 Rushmoor Council election
