= 2024 Rushmoor Borough Council election =

2024 local government election in Rushmoor

- 2 May 2024

13 of 39 seats to Rushmoor Borough Council 20 seats needed for a majority
- Turnout: 33.71%

	First party	Second party	Third party
Leader	Gareth Williams	Gareth Lyon	Craig Card
Party	Labour	Conservative	Liberal Democrats
Leader's seat	Empress	West Heath	St Marks
Seats before	14	23	2
Seats after	21	15	3
Seat change	▲7	▼8	▲1
- Ward map election results
Leader before election
Gareth Lyon
Conservative
Leader after election
Gareth Williams
Labour

The 2024 Rushmoor Borough Council election took place on 2 May 2024 to elect councillors to Rushmoor Borough Council in Hampshire, England. This was on the same date as other local elections across England. A third of the council was up for election. This set of seats was last contested in 2021.

The council was under Conservative majority control prior to the election. The election saw Labour win a majority on the council for the first time in its history. The Labour group leader, Gareth Williams, was appointed leader of the council at the subsequent annual council meeting on 21 May 2024.

== Results summary ==
2024 Rushmoor Borough Council election
Party	This election			Full council			This election		
Party	Seats	Net	Seats %	Other	Total	Total %	Votes	Votes %	+/−
Labour	9	▲7	69.2	12	21	53.8	10,739	48.09	+1.19
Conservative	3	▼8	23.1	12	15	38.5	8,218	36.80	-0.30
Liberal Democrats	1	▲1	7.7	2	3	7.7	2,262	10.13	-4.07
Reform	0	Steady	0.0	0	0	0.0	794	3.56	+3.10
TUSC	0	Steady	0.0	0	0	0.0	212	0.95	+0.94
Heritage	0	Steady	0.0	0	0	0.0	85	0.38	-0.12
Hampshire Independents	0	Steady	0.0	0	0	0.0	21	0.09	New

== Ward results ==
The results for each ward were as follows:

The changes in these results are changes from the 2023 Rushmoor Borough Council election. Sitting councillors standing for re-election are marked with an asterisk (*)

=== Aldershot Park ===
Aldershot Park
Party	Candidate	Votes	%	±%
Labour	Mike Roberts*	911	68.4	−3.6
Conservative	Peter Crerar	325	24.4	+2.6
TUSC	Tom Mortimer	95	7.1	New
Majority		586	44.0	
Turnout		1,331	26.8	
Labour hold		Swing		

=== Cherrywood ===
Cherrywood
Party	Candidate	Votes	%	±%
Labour	Bill O'Donovan	949	61.5	−6.4
Conservative	Nem Thapa*	498	32.3	+0.2
Liberal Democrats	Jane O'Dowd-Booth	96	6.2	New
Majority		451	29.2	
Turnout		1,543	31.0	
Labour gain from Conservative		Swing		

=== Cove and Southwood ===
Cove and Southwood
Party	Candidate	Votes	%	±%
Conservative	Sue Carter*	940	49.5	+1.3
Labour	Becky Miles	758	39.9	+10.2
Liberal Democrats	Rebecca Mitchell	202	10.6	−4.3
Majority		182	9.6	
Turnout		1,900	34.5	
Conservative hold		Swing		

=== Empress ===
Empress
Party	Candidate	Votes	%	±%
Labour	Julie Hall	896	45.3	+5.0
Conservative	Marina Munro*	692	35.0	+1.2
Liberal Democrats	Aidan David Lunn	237	12.0	−9.2
Reform	Ian Simpson	151	7.6	+2.9
Majority		204	10.3	
Turnout		1,976	41.5	
Labour gain from Conservative		Swing		

=== Fernhill ===
Fernhill
Party	Candidate	Votes	%	±%
Conservative	Steve Harden	765	45.8	+8.3
Labour	Julia Warner	758	45.3	−7.5
Liberal Democrats	Brian Blewett	149	8.9	−0.8
Majority		7	0.5	
Turnout		1,672	32.7	
Conservative hold		Swing		

=== Knellwood ===
Knellwood
Party	Candidate	Votes	%	±%
Conservative	Paul Taylor*	882	40.5	+1.9
Labour	Tad Cragg	740	34.0	+5.6
Liberal Democrats	Mark Trotter	469	21.6	−6.2
Heritage	Kevin Joyce	85	3.9	−1.2
Majority		142	6.5	
Turnout		2,176	38.9	
Conservative hold		Swing		

=== Manor Park ===
Manor Park
Party	Candidate	Votes	%	±%
Labour	Ivan Whitmee	1,034	46.4	−8.1
Conservative	Jib Belbase	927	41.6	−3.9
Reform	Brian Lyons	215	9.6	New
TUSC	Agnieszka Cieszkowska	52	2.3	New
Majority		107	4.8	
Turnout		2,228	40.1	
Labour gain from Conservative		Swing		

=== North Town ===
North Town
Party	Candidate	Votes	%	±%
Labour	Keith Dibble*	1,118	82.4	+8.9
Conservative	Bill Withers	238	17.6	−4.1
Majority		880	64.8	
Turnout		1,356	26.8	
Labour hold		Swing		

=== Rowhill ===
Rowhill
Party	Candidate	Votes	%	±%
Labour	Lisa Greenway	998	51.9	+3.2
Conservative	Maurice Sheehan*	515	26.8	−10.3
Reform	Kevin Betsworth	243	12.6	New
Liberal Democrats	Alan Hilliar	130	6.8	−7.5
Hampshire Independents	Zack Culshaw	21	1.1	New
TUSC	Dan Warrington	16	0.8	New
Majority		483	25.1	
Turnout		1,923	38.5	
Labour gain from Conservative		Swing		

=== St John's ===
St John's
Party	Candidate	Votes	%	±%
Labour	Thomas Day	806	48.5	+3.9
Conservative	Rod Cooper	711	42.8	−2.6
Liberal Democrats	Mark Goodwin	145	8.7	−1.3
Majority		95	5.7	
Turnout		1,662	33.7	
Labour gain from Conservative		Swing		

=== St Mark's ===
St Mark's
Party	Candidate	Votes	%	±%
Liberal Democrats	Leola Card	663	42.5	−6.0
Conservative	Diane Bedford*	566	36.3	+1.6
Labour	Madi Jabbi	330	21.2	+4.4
Majority		97	6.2	
Turnout		1,559	29.6	
Liberal Democrats gain from Conservative		Swing		

=== Wellington ===
Wellington
Party	Candidate	Votes	%	±%
Labour	Alex Crawford	744	57.4	+0.9
Conservative	Bishal Gurling	503	38.8	+2.9
TUSC	Ryan Lyddall	49	3.8	+1.9
Majority		241	18.6	
Turnout		1,296	27.2	
Labour gain from Conservative		Swing		

=== West Heath ===
West Heath
Party	Candidate	Votes	%	±%
Labour	Rhian Jones	697	40.8	+0.7
Conservative	Michael Hope*	656	38.4	−3.5
Reform	Gary Cowd	185	10.8	New
Liberal Democrats	Charles Fraser Fleming	171	10.0	−2.8
Majority		41	2.4	
Turnout		1,709	36.0	
Labour gain from Conservative		Swing		

== Changes 2024–2026 ==
- Dhan Sarki, elected for Labour in 2023, left the party in May 2024 to sit as an independent. He later rejoined the party in November 2024.
- Calum Stewart, elected for the Conservatives in 2019, left the party in May 2025 to sit as an independent.
- Jules Crossley, Halleh Koohestani, Nadia Martin and Becky Williams announced that they were leaving the Labour Party in September 2025 to form the Rushmoor Independent Group with standing independent councillor Abe Allen.
