= 2002 Rushmoor Borough Council election =

2002 UK local government election

The 2002 Rushmoor Council election took place on 2 May 2002 to elect members of Rushmoor Borough Council in Hampshire, England. The whole council was up for election with boundary changes since the last election in 2000 reducing the number of seats by 3. The Conservative Party stayed in overall control of the council.

== Candidates ==
Due to the boundary changes all 42 seats on the council were contested with 119 candidates standing in the election. Among the candidates from the main political parties was Paul Bourke, formerly a Conservative, who stood for the Liberal Democrats in Wellington ward and a former parliamentary candidate John Card for Labour in Mayfield. As well as the Conservatives, Liberal Democrats and Labour, there were also 9 Green Party candidates contesting the election in Aldershot wards.

Independents standing in the election included the sitting councillor, Patrick Kirby, who was joined by another 2 independent candidates in Knellwood. Other independents were campaigner Peter Sandy in Heron Wood, poet Derek Asker in Empress ward and the many times candidate Arthur Uther Pendragon.

One sitting councillor who did not stand in the election however was John Debenham, who stood down after having served on the council since it was created in 1974.

== Election result ==
The results saw the Conservatives maintain control of the council after winning 25 of the 42 seats. The Liberal Democrats stayed on 10 seats after regaining a seat in Cove and Southwood, but losing a seat in Manor Park where the deputy mayor George Papresti was defeated. Labour was reduced to 6 seats after losing their last seats in Farnborough, while the only independent elected was Patrick Kirby, who was re-elected in Knellwood.

Split ward results occurred in Knellwood where two Conservatives were elected as well as Patrick Kirby and in St Marks where one Liberal Democrat and two Conservatives won election. The two successful Conservative candidates in Knellwood had to toss a coin to decide which of them would serve 1 or 2 years after they finished with the same number of votes. Roland Dibbs won the coin toss and was elected to 2 years on the council.

Rushmoor local election result 2002
Party	Seats	Gains	Losses	Net gain/loss	Seats %	Votes %	Votes	+/−
Conservative	25			+1	59.5	45.6	24,319	-2.4%
Liberal Democrats	10			0	23.8	28.5	15,229	+0.3%
Labour	6			-4	14.3	19.2	10,262	+1.4%
Independent	1			0	2.4	4.5	2,401	-0.9%
Green	0			0	0	2.2	1,156	+1.6%

== Ward results ==
Cove and Southwood (3)
Party	Candidate	Votes	%	±%
Liberal Democrats	Maurice Banner	724		
Liberal Democrats	John Matthews	647		
Liberal Democrats	Brian Jupp	608		
Conservative	Alan Chainey	573		
Conservative	Keith Jenner	547		
Conservative	David Thomas	537		
Labour	Edward Shelton	146		
Turnout		3,782		

Empress (3)
Party	Candidate	Votes	%	±%
Conservative	Patricia Devereux	1,139		
Conservative	Rosemary Possee	1,010		
Conservative	John Wall	896		
Liberal Democrats	Stephen Chowns	522		
Liberal Democrats	Bryan Bell	506		
Liberal Democrats	Derek Wickens	445		
Labour	Stephen Cottingham	198		
Independent	Derek Asker	192		
Turnout		4,908		

Fernhill (3)
Party	Candidate	Votes	%	±%
Conservative	Alan Ferrier	714		
Conservative	John Marsh	646		
Conservative	Kenneth Muschamp	608		
Liberal Democrats	Sheila Goldie	306		
Liberal Democrats	Marjorie Pratt	285		
Liberal Democrats	Ena Bocon	280		
Labour	Simon Wright	153		
Turnout		2,992		

Grange (3)
Party	Candidate	Votes	%	±%
Conservative	Michael Smith	631		
Conservative	Maurice Sheehan	563		
Conservative	Jon Weston	520		
Labour	Stella Olivier	450		
Labour	Barry Jones	407		
Labour	Terence Bridgeman	394		
Liberal Democrats	Josephine Fraser-Fleming	218		
Liberal Democrats	Hazel Manning	218		
Liberal Democrats	Angela Bramham	217		
Independent	Arthur Pendragon	123		
Turnout		3,741		

Heron Wood (3)
Party	Candidate	Votes	%	±%
Labour	Michael Roberts	745		
Labour	Frank Rust	621		
Labour	Donald Cappleman	612		
Conservative	Hedy Brennan	344		
Conservative	Sandria Gardiner	338		
Conservative	Rosemary Stevens	320		
Independent	Peter Sandy	182		
Liberal Democrats	Denis Ward	160		
Green	Ann Hunt	82		
Green	Adrian Ashurst	76		
Green	Carrie De Fey	55		
Turnout		3,535		

Knellwood (3)
Party	Candidate	Votes	%	±%
Independent	James Kirby	756		
Conservative	Roland Dibbs	735		
Conservative	Paul Taylor	735		
Conservative	Steffen Stoneman	661		
Independent	Keith Parkins	590		
Independent	Gwilym Anthony	558		
Liberal Democrats	Montserrat Starling	333		
Liberal Democrats	Margaret Jupp	330		
Liberal Democrats	Martin Kaye	316		
Labour	William Tootill	143		
Turnout		5,157		

Manor Park (3)
Party	Candidate	Votes	%	±%
Conservative	Colin Balchin	665		
Conservative	Anthony Gardiner	656		
Conservative	Claire Burridge	636		
Liberal Democrats	George Paparesti	558		
Liberal Democrats	Nickolas Burfield	456		
Liberal Democrats	Simon Burfield	432		
Labour	James White	323		
Labour	Carolyne Culver	279		
Labour	June Smith	279		
Turnout		4,284		

Mayfield (3)
Party	Candidate	Votes	%	±%
Liberal Democrats	Craig Card	478		
Liberal Democrats	Charles Fraser-Fleming	477		
Liberal Democrats	Neville Dewey	464		
Labour	John Card	403		
Labour	Clive Grattan	370		
Labour	Robert Sullivan	358		
Conservative	Roderick Baulk	265		
Turnout		2,815		

North Town (3)
Party	Candidate	Votes	%	±%
Labour	Keith Dibble	787		
Labour	Susan Dibble	699		
Labour	Andrew Straker	630		
Conservative	Keith Stott	420		
Conservative	Neil Watkin	378		
Liberal Democrats	Andrew Chittock	189		
Liberal Democrats	Michael Kilburn	182		
Green	Adam Stacey	152		
Green	Samantha Stacey	148		
Green	Peter Still	96		
Turnout		3,681		

Rowhill (3)
Party	Candidate	Votes	%	±%
Conservative	Roger Kimber	810		
Conservative	David Welch	753		
Conservative	Mohammad Choudhary	722		
Labour	Jill Clark	342		
Labour	Lesley Pestridge	315		
Labour	Carol Rust	299		
Liberal Democrats	Richard Ketley	222		
Green	Peter Barnett	200		
Green	Julia Fowler	178		
Green	Timothy Simmons	169		
Turnout		4,010		

St John's (3)
Party	Candidate	Votes	%	±%
Conservative	George Dawson	796		
Conservative	Peter Moyle	789		
Conservative	Graham Tucker	767		
Liberal Democrats	Barbara Darby	402		
Liberal Democrats	Paul Banner	360		
Liberal Democrats	John Simpkins	281		
Labour	Mary Lawrance	236		
Turnout		3,631		

St Mark's (3)
Party	Candidate	Votes	%	±%
Liberal Democrats	John Starling	680		
Conservative	Nigel Baines	673		
Conservative	Diane Bedford	647		
Liberal Democrats	Alistair Mackie	633		
Liberal Democrats	Guy Eaglestone	632		
Conservative	Geraldine Bullard	616		
Labour	Sean Clarke	198		
Turnout		4,079		

Wellington (3)
Party	Candidate	Votes	%	±%
Conservative	David Clifford	447		
Conservative	Edmund Poole	420		
Conservative	Francis Williams	418		
Labour	Alexander Crawford	245		
Labour	Roy King	228		
Labour	Jeremy Wines	210		
Liberal Democrats	Philip Thompson	174		
Liberal Democrats	Vincent Bourke	157		
Liberal Democrats	Peter Woodcock	147		
Turnout		2,446		

West Heath (3)
Party	Candidate	Votes	%	±%
Liberal Democrats	Josephine Murphy	748		
Liberal Democrats	Linda Neal	730		
Liberal Democrats	Shaun Murphy	712		
Conservative	Stephen Masterson	668		
Conservative	Barry Jenner	664		
Conservative	John Skeggs	592		
Labour	Philip Collins	192		
Turnout		4,306		

Preceded by 2000 Rushmoor Council election	Rushmoor local elections	Succeeded by 2003 Rushmoor Council election
