= 2003 Rushmoor Borough Council election =

2003 UK local government election

Results of the 2003 Rushmoor Borough Council election

The 2003 Rushmoor Council election took place on 1 May 2003 to elect members of Rushmoor Borough Council in Hampshire, England. One third of the council was up for election and the Conservative Party stayed in overall control of the council.

After the election, the composition of the council was:

- Conservative 25
- Liberal Democrat 10
- Labour 6
- Independent 1

== Campaign ==
One third of the seats were being elected with the third placed councillor in the 2002 election having their seat be contested. While a couple of former councillors were attempting to win seats back, George Paparesti for the Liberal Democrats in Manor Park and Stella Olivier for Labour in Grange, Labour's group leader Andy Straker stood down at the election and did not defend his seat in North Town. Apart from the 3 main political parties there were also 3 Green, 1 English Democrat and 2 independent candidates.

Rushmoor was one of 18 councils which trialed electronic voting in the 2003 local elections.

== Election result ==
The results saw no seats change hands with the Conservatives keeping their majority on the council. The closest results came in St Mark's ward where Conservative Diane Bedford held on by 30 votes over the Liberal Democrats after a recount and in Manor Park where again the Conservatives finished 47 votes ahead of the Liberal Democrats. Labour held their 2 seats in Heron Wood and North Town with reduced majorities but did not make any gains. Overall turnout in the election was 31%.

Following the election John Marsh remained the leader of the council and Conservatives after defeating a challenge from within the Conservative group by 14 votes to 11. Meanwhile, Keith Dibble became the new leader of the Labour group on the council.

Rushmoor local election result 2003
Party	Seats	Gains	Losses	Net gain/loss	Seats %	Votes %	Votes	+/−
Conservative	9	0	0	0	64.3	44.8	8,192	-0.8%
Liberal Democrats	3	0	0	0	21.4	33.2	6,056	+4.7%
Labour	2	0	0	0	14.3	17.5	3,197	-1.7%
Independent	0	0	0	0	0	2.4	441	-2.1%
Green	0	0	0	0	0	1.4	257	-0.8%
English Democrat	0	0	0	0	0	0.7	123	+0.7%

== Ward results ==
Cove & Southwood
Party	Candidate	Votes	%	±%
Liberal Democrats	Brian Jupp	691	49.2	
Conservative	David Thomas	545	38.8	
Labour	Edward Shelton	130	9.3	
Green	James Page	39	2.8	
Majority		146	10.4	
Turnout		1,405	34.0	
Liberal Democrats hold		Swing		

Empress
Party	Candidate	Votes	%	±%
Conservative	John Wall	940	56.2	
Liberal Democrats	Stephen Chowns	534	31.9	
Labour	Christopher Wright	199	11.9	
Majority		406	24.3	
Turnout		1,673	37.9	
Conservative hold		Swing		

Fernhill
Party	Candidate	Votes	%	±%
Conservative	Kenneth Muschamp	596	50.5	
Liberal Democrats	Richard Shaw	424	35.9	
Labour	Martin Coule	160	13.6	
Majority		172	14.6	
Turnout		1,180	29.1	
Conservative hold		Swing		

Grange
Party	Candidate	Votes	%	±%
Conservative	Jon Weston	738	51.9	
Labour	Stella Olivier	369	25.9	
Liberal Democrats	Hazel Manning	229	16.1	
Independent	Arthur Pendragon	86	6.0	
Majority		369	26.0	
Turnout		1,422	35.3	
Conservative hold		Swing		

Heron Wood
Party	Candidate	Votes	%	±%
Labour	Donald Cappleman	545	47.0	
Conservative	Andrew Hankins	408	35.2	
Liberal Democrats	Ian Colpus	206	17.8	
Majority		137	11.8	
Turnout		1,159	27.0	
Labour hold		Swing		

Knellwood
Party	Candidate	Votes	%	±%
Conservative	Roland Dibbs	742	46.4	
Liberal Democrats	Martin Kaye	382	23.9	
Independent	Keith Parkins	355	22.2	
Labour	William Tootill	119	7.4	
Majority		360	22.5	
Turnout		1,598	39.4	
Conservative hold		Swing		

Manor Park
Party	Candidate	Votes	%	±%
Conservative	Peter Crerar	654	45.2	
Liberal Democrats	George Paparesti	607	41.9	
Labour	June Smith	187	12.9	
Majority		47	3.3	
Turnout		1,448	33.7	
Conservative hold		Swing		

Mayfield
Party	Candidate	Votes	%	±%
Liberal Democrats	Neville Dewey	587	57.7	
Labour	Clive Grattan	236	23.2	
Conservative	Roderick Baulk	195	19.2	
Majority		351	34.5	
Turnout		1,018	25.6	
Liberal Democrats hold		Swing		

North Town
Party	Candidate	Votes	%	±%
Labour	Carolyne Culver	498	41.3	
Conservative	Neil Watkin	376	31.2	
Liberal Democrats	Peter Sandy	251	20.8	
Green	Adam Stacey	81	6.7	
Majority		122	10.1	
Turnout		1,206	27.8	
Labour hold		Swing		

Rowhill
Party	Candidate	Votes	%	±%
Conservative	Mohammad Choudhary	710	53.8	
Liberal Democrats	Philip Thompson	287	21.8	
Labour	Jill Clark	239	18.1	
Green	Julia Fowler	83	6.3	
Majority		423	32.0	
Turnout		1,319	32.7	
Conservative hold		Swing		

St John's
Party	Candidate	Votes	%	±%
Conservative	Graham Tucker	676	62.4	
Liberal Democrats	Martine Howell	408	37.6	
Majority		268	24.8	
Turnout		1,084	25.1	
Conservative hold		Swing		

St Mark's
Party	Candidate	Votes	%	±%
Conservative	Diane Bedford	648	45.8	
Liberal Democrats	Alistair Mackie	618	43.7	
Labour	Barry Jones	149	10.5	
Majority		30	2.1	
Turnout		1,415	31.4	
Conservative hold		Swing		

Wellington
Party	Candidate	Votes	%	±%
Conservative	Francis Williams	383	47.6	
Labour	Robert Sullivan	222	27.6	
Liberal Democrats	Nickolaus Burfield	145	18.0	
Green	Samantha Stacey	54	6.7	
Majority		161	20.0	
Turnout		804	18.8	
Conservative hold		Swing		

West Heath
Party	Candidate	Votes	%	±%
Liberal Democrats	Shaun Murphy	687	44.8	
Conservative	Stephen Masterson	581	37.9	
Labour	Philip Collins	144	9.4	
English Democrat	Gary Cowd	123	8.0	
Majority		106	6.9	
Turnout		1,535	37.2	
Liberal Democrats hold		Swing		

Preceded by 2002 Rushmoor Council election	Rushmoor local elections	Succeeded by 2004 Rushmoor Council election
