= 2022 Rushmoor Borough Council election =

2022 UK local government election

2022 Rushmoor Borough Council Election
- 5 May 2022

13 seats of 39 to Rushmoor Borough Council 20 seats needed for a majority
	First party	Second party	Third party
Party	Conservative	Labour	Liberal Democrats
Last election	9	2	0
Seats before	28	9	1
- The winner of each seat by party in the 2022 Rushmoor Borough Council Election
Council control before election
Conservative
Council control after election
TBD

Elections to Rushmoor Borough Council took place on 5 May 2022 as part of the 2022 United Kingdom local elections.

== Results summary ==
2022 Rushmoor Borough Council election
Party	This election			Full council			This election		
Party	Seats	Net	Seats %	Other	Total	Total %	Votes	Votes %	+/−
Conservative	8	▼1	61.5	20	28	71.8	9,514	45.42	-7.3
Labour	4	Steady	30.8	5	9	23.1	8,142	38.87	+5.2
Liberal Democrats	1	▲1	7.7	1	2	5.1	3,290	15.71	+2.8

== Ward results ==
=== Aldershot Park ===
Aldershot Park
Party	Candidate	Votes	%	±%
Labour	Jules Crossley	840	59.9	+8.3
Conservative	David Armitage	562	40.1	−1.7
Majority		278	19.8	
Labour hold		Swing		

=== Cherrywood ===
Cherrywood
Party	Candidate	Votes	%	±%
Labour	Clive Grattan	1,008	58.0	+10.7
Conservative	Suman Pun	730	42.0	−10.7
Majority				
Labour hold		Swing		

=== Cove and Southwood ===
Cove and Southwood
Party	Candidate	Votes	%	±%
Conservative	Martin Tennant	869	64.9	−12.6
Labour	Madi Jabbi	417	20.7	+4.4
Liberal Democrats	Emily Mitchell	374	14.5	+8.0
Majority				
Conservative hold		Swing		

=== Empress ===
Empress
Party	Candidate	Votes	%	±%
Conservative	Mike Smith	739	46.6	−4.4
Labour	Gareth Williams	514	32.2	+10.2
Liberal Democrats	Leola Card	337	21.1	+0.5
Majority				
Conservative hold		Swing		

=== Fernhill ===
Fernhill
Party	Candidate	Votes	%	±%
Conservative	Akmal Gani	705	50.7	−21.4
Labour	Janet Gardner	391	28.1	+0.3
Liberal Democrats	Nat Sweet	293	21.0	+21.0
Majority				
Conservative hold		Swing		

=== Knellwood ===
Knellwood
Party	Candidate	Votes	%	±%
Conservative	Mara Makunura	1,077	50.1	−5.4
Liberal Democrats	Jill Whyman	602	28.0	+2.8
Labour	Colin Southon	469	21.8	+5.1
Majority				
Conservative hold		Swing		

=== Manor Park ===
Manor Park
Party	Candidate	Votes	%	±%
Conservative	Peace Essien Igodifo	867	45.8	−11.1
Labour	Brandon Renard	783	41.4	+9.2
Liberal Democrats	Mark Trotter	241	12.7	+1.8
Majority				
Conservative hold		Swing		

=== North Town ===
North Town
Party	Candidate	Votes	%	±%
Labour	Sarah Spall	1,037	69.8	+5.1
Conservative	Andrew Perkins	449	30.2	−0.1
Majority				
Labour hold		Swing		

=== Rowhill ===
Rowhill
Party	Candidate	Votes	%	±%
Conservative	Stuart Trussler	707	40.5	−4.6
Labour	Halleh Koohestani	663	38.0	+1.3
Liberal Democrats	Alan Hilliar	374	21.4	+3.2
Majority				
Conservative hold		Swing		

=== St John’s ===
St John’s
Party	Candidate	Votes	%	±%
Conservative	Jacqui Vosper	839	53.6	−13.8
Labour	Julia Warner	724	46.3	+13.8
Majority				
Conservative hold		Swing		

=== St Mark’s ===
St Mark’s
Party	Candidate	Votes	%	±%
Liberal Democrats	Craig Card	778	44.5	+4.0
Conservative	Abul Chowdhury	710	40.6	−4.4
Labour	Barry Jones	260	14.8	−0.4
Majority		68	3.9	
Liberal Democrats gain from Conservative		Swing		

=== Wellington ===
Wellington
Party	Candidate	Votes	%	±%
Labour	Nadia Martin	608	56.4	+18.8
Conservative	Mary Hartley	470	43.6	−11.3
Majority				
Labour hold		Swing		

=== West Heath ===
West Heath
Party	Candidate	Votes	%	±%
Conservative	Ade Adeola	790	52.3	−4.2
Labour	Rebekkah Thomas	428	28.3	+2.7
Liberal Democrats	Olive Jane O'Dowd-Booth	291	19.2	+1.6
Majority		362	24.0	
Conservative hold		Swing		
