= 2014 Rushmoor Borough Council election =

2014 UK local government election

- 22 May 2014

13 seats of 39 to Rushmoor Borough Council 20 seats needed for a majority
	First party	Second party	Third party
Party	Conservative	Labour	UKIP
Seats before	25	11	3
Seats won	8	4	1
Seats after	24	12	3
Seat change	▼1	▲1	Steady
Popular vote	9,883	6,391	4,509
- Results by Ward
Council control before election
Conservative
Council control after election
Conservative

The 2014 Rushmoor Borough Council election took place on 22 May 2014 to elect members of Rushmoor Borough Council in England. This was on the same day as other local elections and the elections for the European Parliament.

Labour gained one seat from the Conservatives, while UKIP regained a seat whose previous incumbent had defected to Labour.

After the election, the composition of the council was:

- Conservative - 24
- Labour - 12
- UKIP - 3

== Results ==
Rushmoor local election result 2014
Party	Seats	Gains	Losses	Net gain/loss	Seats %	Votes %	Votes	+/−
Conservative	8	0	1	▼1	61.53	43.94	9,883	
Labour	4	1	0	▲1	30.76	28.41	6,391	
UKIP	1	0	0	Steady	7.69	20.04	4,509	
Liberal Democrats	0	0	0	Steady		4.50	1,013	
Green				Steady		2.83	637	
Christian				Steady		0.26	58	

== Ward results ==
=== Aldershot Park ===
Aldershot Park
Party	Candidate	Votes	%	±%
Labour	Terence Bridgeman	877	55.85	
Conservative	Adrian Newell	693	44.14	
Majority		184	11.71	
Turnout		1,570		
Labour hold		Swing		

=== Cherrywood ===
Cherrywood
Party	Candidate	Votes	%	±%
Labour	Les Taylor	772	46.70	
Conservative	Derek Cornwell	600	36.29	
Liberal Democrats	Craig Card	281	16.99	
Majority		172	10.40	
Turnout		1,653		
Labour hold		Swing		

=== Cove & Southwood ===
Cove and Southwood
Party	Candidate	Votes	%	±%
Conservative	Martin Tennant	980	49.92	
UKIP	David Bell	646	32.90	
Labour	Clive Andrews	337	17.16	
Majority		334	17.01	
Turnout		1,963		
Conservative hold		Swing		

=== Empress ===
Empress
Party	Candidate	Votes	%	±%
Conservative	Michael Smith	786	44.13	
Green	Donna Wallace	345	19.37	
UKIP	Jane Shattock	335	18.80	
Labour	Philip Collins	188	10.55	
Liberal Democrats	Shaun Murphy	127	7.13	
Majority		441	24.76	
Turnout		1,781		
Conservative hold		Swing		

=== Fernhill ===
Fernhill
Party	Candidate	Votes	%	±%
Conservative	Kenneth Muschamp	913	51.26	
UKIP	Peter Donaghue	503	28.24	
Labour	Leonard Amos	342	19.20	
Majority		410	23.02	
Turnout		1,781		
Conservative hold		Swing		

=== Knellwood ===
Knellwood
Party	Candidate	Votes	%	±%
Conservative	Adam Jackman	1,504	70.21	
Labour	William Tootill	638	29.78	
Majority		866	40.42	
Turnout		2,142		
Conservative hold		Swing		

=== Manor Park ===
Manor Park
Party	Candidate	Votes	%	±%
Conservative	Bruce Thomas	755	38.79	
Labour	Dominique Swaddling	602	30.93	
UKIP	Angela Lennox	589	30.26	
Majority		153	7.86	
Turnout		1,946		
Conservative hold		Swing		

=== North Town ===
North Town
Party	Candidate	Votes	%	±%
Labour	Peter Rust	1,025	66.64	
Conservative	Lee Dawson	513	33.35	
Majority		512	33.28	
Turnout		1,538		
Labour hold		Swing		

=== Rowhill ===
Rowhill
Party	Candidate	Votes	%	±%
Conservative	Sabaah Choudhary	812	42.20	
UKIP	Edmund Poole	660	34.30	
Labour	Frances Matthews	452	23.49	
Majority		152	7.90	
Turnout		1,924		
Conservative hold		Swing		

=== St John's ===
St John's
Party	Candidate	Votes	%	±%
Conservative	Jacqueline Vosper	878	47.76	
UKIP	William Walker	629	34.22	
Labour	Peter Hayward	331	18.00	
Majority		249	13.54	
Turnout		1,838		
Conservative hold		Swing		

=== St Mark's ===
St Mark's
Party	Candidate	Votes	%	±%
Conservative	David Gladstone	649	38.93	
Liberal Democrats	Abul Koher Chowdhury	426	25.55	
Green	Carl Hewitt	292	17.51	
Labour	Colin Southon	242	14.51	
Christian	Juliana Brimicombe	58	3.47	
Majority		223	13.37	
Turnout		1,667		
Conservative hold		Swing		

=== Wellington ===
Wellington
Party	Candidate	Votes	%	±%
Labour	Jeremy Preece	264	41.97	
Conservative	Attika Choudhary	188	29.88	
UKIP	Adam le Gresley	177	28.13	
Majority		76	12.08	
Turnout		629		
Labour gain from Conservative		Swing		

=== West Heath ===
West Heath
Party	Candidate	Votes	%	±%
UKIP	Barbara Donaghue	970	46.58	
Conservative	Jacqueline Hammond	612	29.39	
Labour	Suzan Gadsby	321	15.41	
Liberal Democrats	Philip Thompson	179	8.59	
Majority		358	17.19	
Turnout		2,082		
UKIP hold		Swing		
