= 2021 Rushmoor Borough Council election =

2021 UK local government election

2021 Rushmoor Borough Council Election
- 6 May 2021

13 seats of 39 to Rushmoor Borough Council 20 seats needed for a majority
	First party	Second party	Third party
Party	Conservative	Labour	Liberal Democrats
Last election	9	3	1
Seats before	26	10	1
Seat change	+3	-2
- Map showing the results of the 2021 Rushmoor Borough Council election
Council control before election
Conservative
Council control after election
TBD

Elections to Rushmoor Borough Council took place on 6 May 2021 as part of the 2021 United Kingdom local elections. This took place at the same time as the elections for Hampshire County Council and the Hampshire Police and Crime Commissioner.

== Background ==
In the previous election, the Conservatives won nine of the 13 seats up for election. In the 2021 election they were due to defend eight of thirteen seats up for election, and were mathematically incapable of losing their majority. The statement of persons nominated was published on Friday 9 April.

== Results summary ==
2021 Rushmoor Borough Council election
Party	This election				Full council			This election		
Party	Candidates	Seats	Net	Seats %	Other	Total	Total %	Votes	Votes %	+/−
Conservative	{{{candidates}}}	11	▲3	78.6	18	29	74.4	12,876	52.7	+8.6
Labour	{{{candidates}}}	3	▼2	21.4	6	9	23.1	8,228	33.7	+2.7
Liberal Democrats	{{{candidates}}}	0	Steady	0.0	1	1	2.6	3,161	12.9	+1.3
Independent	{{{candidates}}}	0	Steady	0.0	0	0	0.0	96	0.4	-3.3
UKIP	{{{candidates}}}	0	▼1	0.0	0	0	0.0	64	0.3	-9.5
Reform	{{{candidates}}}	0	Steady	0.0	0	0	0.0	21	0.1	New

== Ward results ==
=== Aldershot Park ===
Aldershot Park
Party	Candidate	Votes	%	±%
Labour	Mike Roberts	788	51.6	−5.6
Conservative	Sam Trussler	638	41.8	+22.5
Liberal Democrats	Liz Scopes	102	6.7	N/A
Majority		150	9.8	
Labour hold		Swing		

=== Cherrywood ===
Cherrywood
Party	Candidate	Votes	%	±%
Conservative	Nem Thapa	898	52.7	+27.9
Labour	Clive Grattan	806	47.3	−2.1
Majority		92	5.4	
Conservative gain from Labour		Swing		

=== Cove and Southwood ===
Cove and Southwood
Party	Candidate	Votes	%	±%
Conservative	Sue Carter	1,275	64.9	+15.6
Labour	Madi Jabbi	406	20.7	+5.2
Liberal Democrats	Jill Whyman	285	14.5	−5.9
Majority		869	44.2	
Conservative hold		Swing		

=== Empress ===
Empress
Party	Candidate	Votes	%	±%
Conservative	Marina Munro	940	50.9	+13.1
Labour	Barry Jones	408	22.1	−2.1
Liberal Democrats	Leola Card	383	20.7	N/A
Independent	Donna Wallace	96	5.2	−24.9
Reform	Benjamin Seery	21	1.1	N/A
Majority		532	28.8	
Conservative hold		Swing		

=== Fernhill ===
Fernhill
Party	Candidate	Votes	%	±%
Conservative	Jessica Auton	1,137	72.2	+8.4
Labour	Ross Collins	437	27.8	+4.0
Majority		700		
Conservative hold		Swing		

=== Knellwood ===
Knellwood
Party	Candidate	Votes	%	±%
Conservative	Paul Taylor	1,334	55.5	+10.5
Liberal Democrats	Craig Card	605	25.2	+5.2
Labour	Gareth Williams	401	16.7	+3.8
UKIP	Zack Culshaw	64	2.7	−6.4
Majority				
Conservative hold		Swing		

=== Manor Park ===
Manor Park
Party	Candidate	Votes	%	±%
Conservative	David Clifford	1,237	56.9	+3.9
Labour	Jules Crossley	701	32.2	−2.5
Liberal Democrats	Mark Trotter	236	10.9	N/A
Majority				
Conservative hold		Swing		

=== North Town ===
North Town (2)
Party	Candidate	Votes	%	±%
Labour	Keith Dibble	1,110	64.8	+2.3
Labour	Sarah Spall	761	44.4	−18.1
Conservative	Stuart Trussler	519	30.3	−7.2
Conservative	Mary Hartley	469	27.4	−10.1
Liberal Democrats	Glenn Christodoulou	95	5.5	N/A
Majority				
Labour hold		Swing		
Labour hold		Swing		

=== Rowhill ===
Rowhill
Party	Candidate	Votes	%	±%
Conservative	Maurice Sheehan	887	45.1	+10.2
Labour	Alex Crawford	722	36.7	+12.9
Liberal Democrats	Alan Hilliar	358	18.2	−3.3
Majority		165	8.4	
Conservative hold		Swing		

=== St John’s ===
St John’s
Party	Candidate	Votes	%	±%
Conservative	Jonathan Canty	1,165	67.5	−4.9
Labour	Julia Warner	560	32.5	+4.9
Majority				
Conservative hold		Swing		

=== St Mark’s ===
St Mark’s
Party	Candidate	Votes	%	±%
Conservative	Diane Bedford	775	44.6	+10.9
Liberal Democrats	Emily Mitchell	698	40.1	+1.9
Labour	Carl Hewitt	266	15.3	−0.2
Majority				
Conservative hold		Swing		

=== Wellington ===
Wellington
Party	Candidate	Votes	%	±%
Conservative	Jib Belbase	587	54.9	+8.0
Labour	Halleh Koohestani	402	37.6	−3.3
Liberal Democrats	Olive O'Dowd-Booth	81	7.6	−4.8
Majority				
Conservative gain from Labour		Swing		

=== West Heath ===
West Heath
Party	Candidate	Votes	%	±%
Conservative	Michael Hope	1,015	56.6	+25.2
Labour	Rebekkah Thomas	460	25.7	+10.8
Liberal Democrats	Charlie Fraser-Fleming	318	17.7	+3.4
Majority				
Conservative gain from UKIP		Swing		
