= 2016 Rushmoor Borough Council election =

2016 UK local government election

- 5 May 2016

13 seats of 39 to Rushmoor Borough Council 20 seats needed for a majority
	First party	Second party	Third party
Party	Conservative	Labour	UKIP
Seats won	8	4	1
Seats after	25	11	3
Seat change	Steady	Steady	Steady
Popular vote	8,024	5,287	4,492
- Results by Ward
Council control before election
Conservative
Council control after election
Conservative

The 2016 Rushmoor Borough Council election took place on 5 May 2016 to elect members of Rushmoor Borough Council in England. This was on the same day as other local elections. Note the election for Aldershot Park was postponed to 2 June due to the death of a candidate.

== Results summary ==
Rushmoor Borough Council election, 2016
Party	Seats	Gains	Losses	Net gain/loss	Seats %	Votes %	Votes	+/−
Conservative	8	0	0	0	66.7	40	7,760	
Labour	3	0	0	0	25.0	24.6	4,762	
UKIP	1	0	0	0	8.3	21.6	4,178	
Liberal Democrats	0	0	0	0	0.0	8	1,557	
Green	0	0	0	0	0.0	5.6	1,083	
Independent	0	0	0	0	0.0	0.2	43	

== Ward results ==
=== Aldershot Park ===
Aldershot Park 2016
Party	Candidate	Votes	%	±%
Labour	Mike Roberts	525	45.89	
UKIP	Jeffery Boxall	314	27.44	
Conservative	Matthew Collins	264	23.07	
Green	Lucy Perrin	41	3.58	
Majority		211	18.44	
Labour hold		Swing		

=== Cherrywood ===
Cherrywood 2016
Party	Candidate	Votes	%	±%
Labour	Clive Grattan	738	43.9%	
UKIP	Derek Roy Cornwell	442	26.3%	
Conservative	Mara Makunura	360	21.4%	
Liberal Democrats	Shaun Patrick Joseph Murphy	143	8.5%	
Majority				
Labour hold		Swing		

=== Cove and Southwood ===
Cove and Southwood 2016
Party	Candidate	Votes	%	±%
Conservative	Susan Mary Carter	818	48.6%	
UKIP	Jenny Parsons	389	23.1%	
Labour	Madi Jabbi	233	13.8%	
Liberal Democrats	Alain Stephen Dekker	168	10%	
Green	Justin Palmer	76	4.5%	
Majority				
Conservative hold		Swing		

=== Empress ===
Empress 2016
Party	Candidate	Votes	%	±%
Conservative	Marina Munro	805	49.5%	
Green	Donna Wallace	425	26.1%	
Labour	Peter Hayward	203	12.5%	
UKIP	Colin Nixon	193	11.9%	
Majority				
Conservative hold		Swing		

=== Fernhill ===
Fernhill 2016
Party	Candidate	Votes	%	±%
Conservative	John Edward Woolley	822	52.9	
UKIP	Harry Dagger Nelson	352	22.8	
Labour	Len Amos	260	16.7	
Green	Martin Anthony Coule	119	7.6	
Majority				
Conservative hold		Swing		

=== Knellwood ===
Knellwood 2016
Party	Candidate	Votes	%	±%
Conservative	Paul Graham Taylor	1159	58.2%	
Labour	Bill Tootill	279	14%	
UKIP	Rosie Bell	243	12.2%	
Liberal Democrats	Jeffrey Michael De Noronha	161	8.1%	
Green	Amy Hannah Lewry	151	7.6%	
Majority				
Conservative hold		Swing		

=== Manor Park ===
Manor Park 2016
Party	Candidate	Votes	%	±%
Conservative	David Edward Clifford	816	43.9%	
Labour	Dominique Jamie Alexandra Swaddling	447	24%	
Liberal Democrats	Richard James Adair	359	19.3%	
UKIP	David Lee Collett	237	12.7%	
Majority				
Conservative hold		Swing		

=== North Town ===
North Town 2016
Party	Candidate	Votes	%	±%
Labour	Keith Dibble	1025	68.7%	
Conservative	David Anthony Armitage	269	18%	
UKIP	Mark Letties	199	13.3%	
Majority				
Labour hold		Swing		

=== Rowhill ===
Rowhill 2016
Party	Candidate	Votes	%	±%
Conservative	Maurice Leonard Sheehan	721	41.3%	
UKIP	Kevin Betsworth	457	26.2%	
Labour	Julie Martha Considine	417	23.9%	
Green	Peta Martine Howell	149	8.5%	
Majority				
Conservative hold		Swing		

=== St John’s ===
St John’s 2016
Party	Candidate	Votes	%	±%
Conservative	Peter John Moyle	740	44.6%	
UKIP	Chris Harding	486	29.3%	
Labour	Sue Gadsby	303	18.3%	
Liberal Democrats	Philip Geoffrey Thompson	129	7.8%	
Majority				
Conservative hold		Swing		

=== St Mark’s ===
St Mark’s 2016
Party	Candidate	Votes	%	±%
Conservative	Diane Beverley Bedford	611	39.2%	
Liberal Democrats	Abul Koher Chowdhury	439	28.1%	
Labour	Colin Southon	219	14%	
UKIP	Simon Amir Austridge	178	11.4%	
Green	Gary Simpson	70	4.5%	
Independent	Carl Robert Hewitt	43	2.8%	
Majority				
Conservative hold		Swing		

=== Wellington ===
Wellington 2016
Party	Candidate	Votes	%	±%
Labour	Alex Crawford	385	63%	
Conservative	Attika Salim Choudhary	190	31.1%	
Liberal Democrats	Haydar Koher	36	5.9%	
Majority				
Labour hold		Swing		

=== West Heath ===
West Heath 2016
Party	Candidate	Votes	%	±%
UKIP	Mark Staplehurst	1002	52.2%	
Conservative	Steve Morgan	449	23.4%	
Labour	Trevor Simpson	253	13.2%	
Liberal Democrats	Josephine Patricia Murphy	122	6.4%	
Green	Paula Samantha Marshall	93	4.8%	
Majority				
UKIP hold		Swing		
