= 1999 Rushmoor Borough Council election =

1999 UK local government election

The 1999 Rushmoor Council election took place on 6 May 1999 to elect members of Rushmoor Borough Council in Hampshire, England. One third of the council was up for election and the council stayed under no overall control.

After the election, the composition of the council was

- Conservative 18
- Liberal Democrat 14
- Labour 13

== Election result ==
Rushmoor local election result 1999
Party	Seats	Gains	Losses	Net gain/loss	Seats %	Votes %	Votes	+/−
Conservative	6			+1	40.0			
Liberal Democrats	5			0	33.3			
Labour	4			-1	26.7			
