= Princes Gardens, Aldershot =

Urban park in Aldershot, Hampshire, England

Coordinates: 51°15′01″N 0°46′01″W

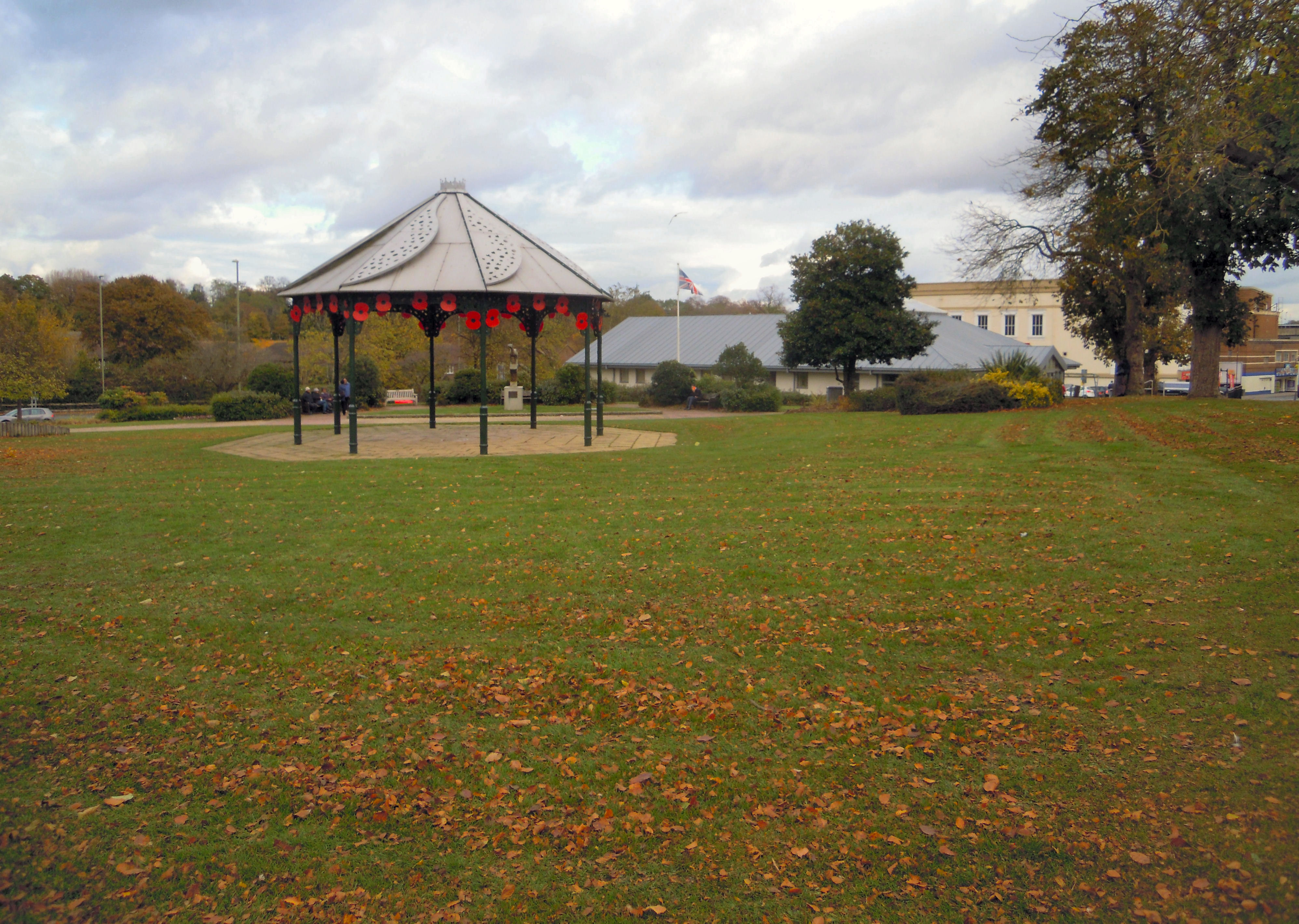
View across Princes Gardens with the Princes Gardens Surgery in the background

The Princes Gardens is an urban park in the town of Aldershot in Hampshire. A short walk from the town centre on a site bordered by the town's High Street, Wellington Avenue and Princes Way (formerly Barrack Road) and opposite the Princes Hall theatre, it has been a public park since 1930. Today the park is managed by Rushmoor Borough Council.

== History ==
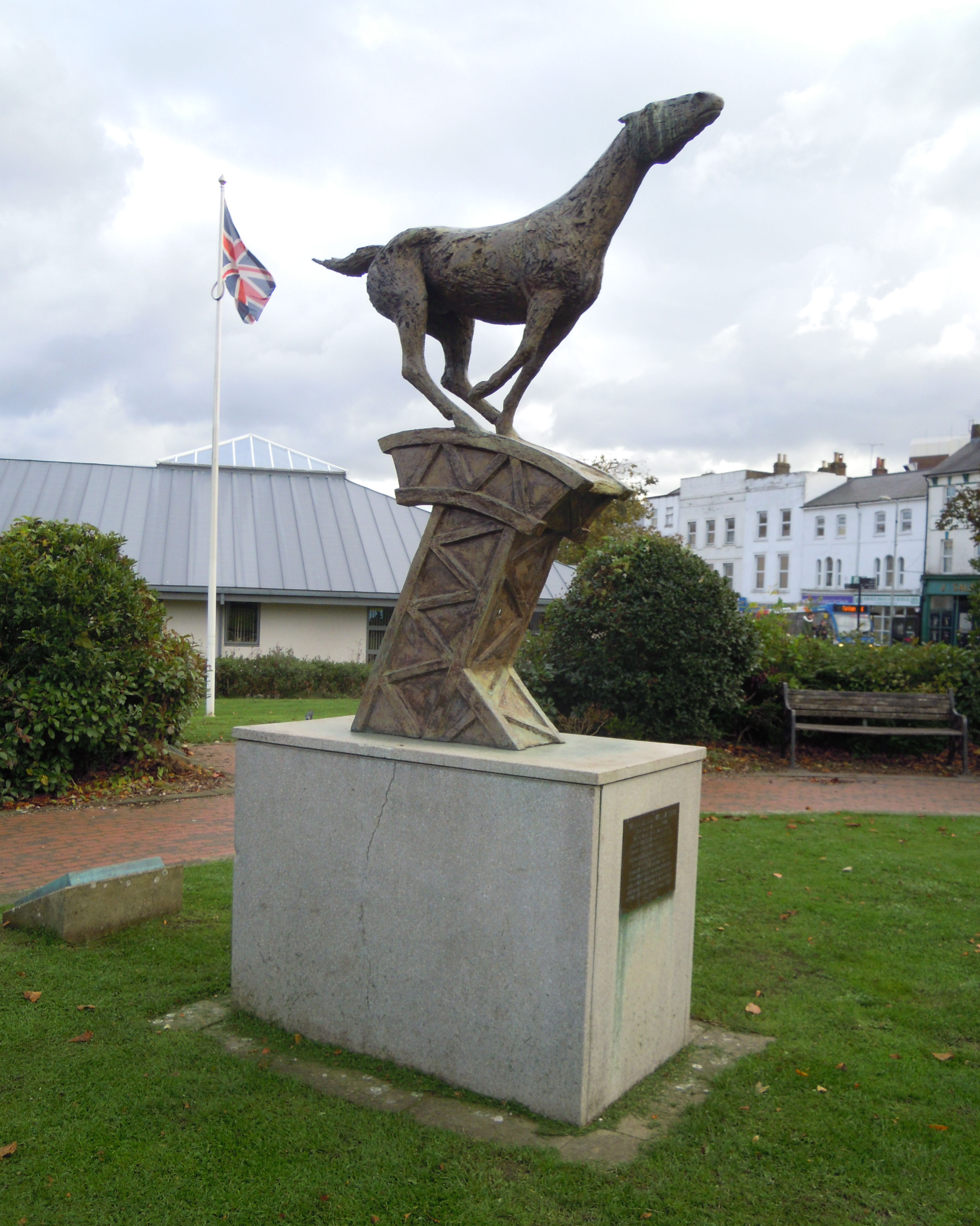
Charging Horse sculpture in Princes Gardens

The park is on the site of the former Royal Engineers Yard where a small party of NCOs and men of the Royal Engineers arrived in November 1853 making them the first soldiers to arrive in Aldershot, a fact commemorated on a modest plaque in the ground behind the sculpture of the horse and Bailey bridge. These engineers were responsible for surveying and making the preliminary arrangements for Aldershot Camp. At this time the area was heathland with the only building in sight being the Union Poor House, the former home of the Tichborne family. As the Camp was established and grew, the Royal Engineers expanded their initial small collection of huts and this area became the Royal Engineers Yard. It continued to be used for this purpose until 1929 when the military huts were demolished.

The area that is now Princes Gardens was purchased from the War Department by Aldershot Borough Council in 1930 at a cost of £16,500 and the site cleared. Over the next decade two cinemas were built at the lower end of the site, the Empire and Ritz cinemas, while the upper end was used as the Princes Gardens with a car park between it and the cinemas. The Aldershot Gazette and Military News welcomed the new Princes Gardens which had turned land that had been “an almost desolate waste” into “a beauty spot” which would be “more restful to the eye than the old barren promontory” left after the removal of the Royal Engineers’ Yard. On 5 July 1945 troops of the Canadian Army Overseas gathered in the gardens before smashing the windows of local shops on the second evening of the Aldershot riot. An ornamental fountain was unveiled in the gardens in 1954 to commemorate the 100th anniversary of the Army in Aldershot. This was later removed.

== Today ==
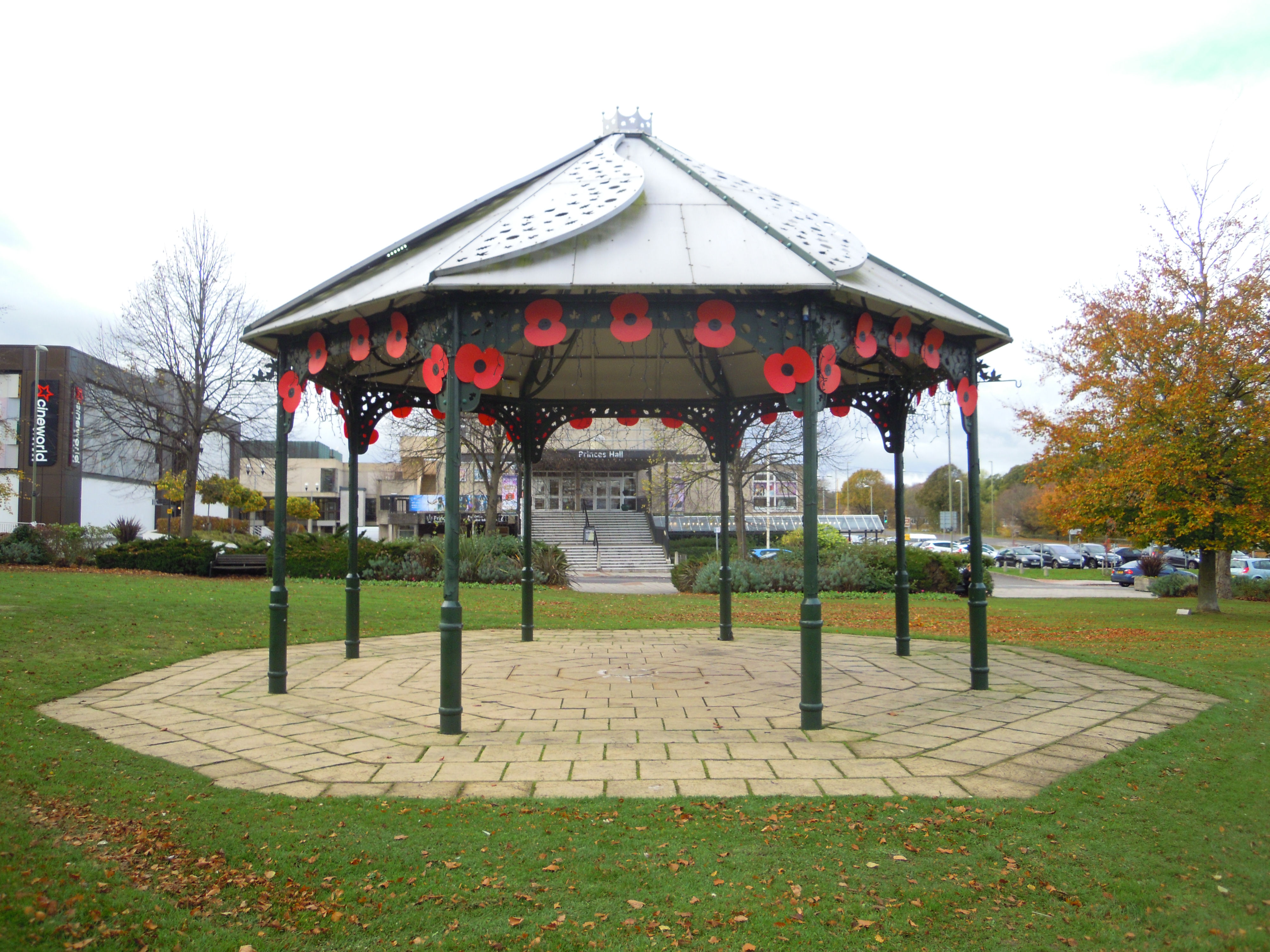
Bandstand in Princes Gardens

Today Princes Gardens is a venue for public events including local celebrations and public concerts. It has a number of ornamental flower beds with grassed areas and seating. In celebration of the Queen's Diamond Jubilee Rushmoor Borough Council erected a permanent bandstand in 2012 where brass bands, dancers and solo artists regularly perform. The design was chosen by local people and the bandstand was officially opened in 2012 during the town's Victoria Day Jubilee Celebration Victoria Day Jubilee Celebration. Central to the park is a sculpture of a charging horse crossing a section of Bailey bridge titled “The end is where we start from” which was unveiled in 1994 as part of an Older Urban Area Regeneration scheme and which represents the link between the civilian town of Aldershot and the British Army.

Princes Gardens also has a refurbished cast iron wheel on a blue pearl granite plinth which was erected in celebration of the 100th anniversary of Rotary International together with other plaques and memorials celebrating the site's historic background.

In 2010 the Princes Gardens Surgery was built on part of the lower section of Princes Gardens.

Princes Gardens features in the novel Maralinga by Judy Nunn.

=== The Airborne Soldier ===
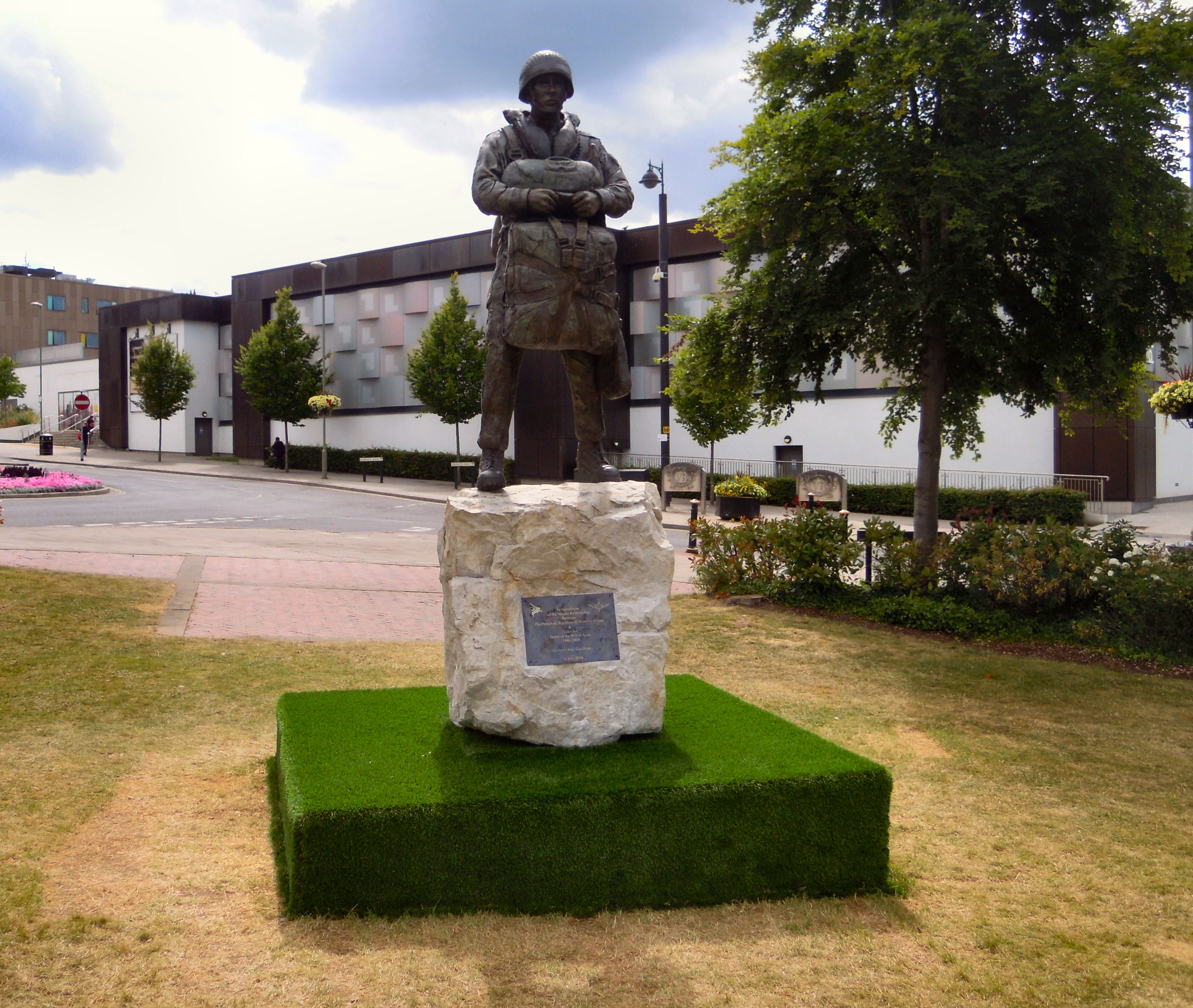
Statue 'The Airborne Soldier' unveiled in Princes Gardens in 2019

On 6 July 2019 a life-size statue called 'The Airborne Soldier' was unveiled in the park. The figure stands on a base of stone from the Falkland Islands, a gift from the people and Government of the Falkland Islands. Sculpted by Amy Goodman, the statue is located in Aldershot in recognition of the more than 50 years association the Parachute Regiment and Airborne Forces had with the town and people of Aldershot from 1946 to 2000. The statue is placed looking towards the former Parachute Regiment Depot in the Military Town. More than 2,000 former and serving Airborne Forces soldiers led by the Band of the Parachute Regiment paraded at the celebrations followed by a drumhead service in Princes Gardens.

=== Statue of Rifleman Kulbir Thapa VC ===
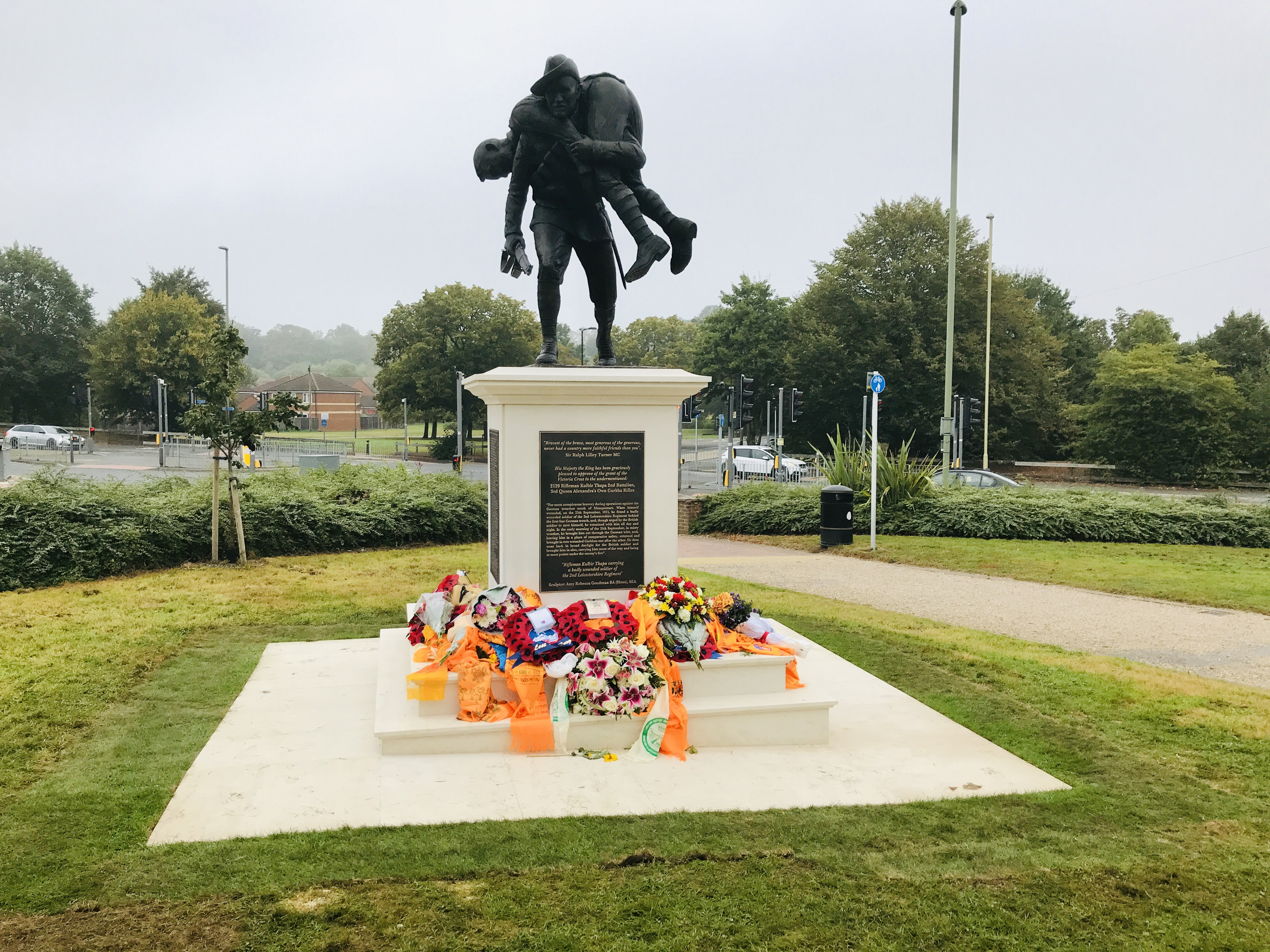
Statue of Kulbir Thapa in the action that was to win him the Victoria Cross in 1915

On 25 September 2021 a life-size bronze statue of Kulbir Thapa carrying a wounded British soldier from the Leicestershire Regiment off the battlefield during World War One was unveiled in Princes Gardens in Aldershot in Hampshire.

Thapa was a 26-year-old Rifleman in the 2nd Battalion, 3rd Queen Alexandra's Own Gurkha Rifles during World War I when, despite having been wounded himself, he found a wounded soldier of The Leicestershire Regiment behind the first-line German trench (believed to be a 20-year-old soldier from Melton Mowbray by the name of Bill Keightley). Although urged to save himself, the Gurkha stayed with the wounded man all day and night. Early next day he brought in two wounded Gurkhas, one after the other. He then went back, and, in broad daylight, fetched the British soldier, carrying him most of the way under enemy fire.

The memorial was commissioned by the Greater Rushmoor Nepali Community to highlight the bond between Nepal and Great Britain dating back more than two centuries. Funded by private donations, the £180,000 statue was created by Hampshire-based sculptor Amy Goodman. It was unveiled to coincide with the day on 25 September 1915 when Thapa performed the heroic action which was to win him the first Victoria Cross to be awarded to a Gurkha soldier.

== See also ==
- Aldershot Park
- Brickfields Country Park
- Manor Park
- Municipal Gardens, Aldershot
- Rowhill Nature Reserve
