= Aldershot Town Hall =

Municipal building in Aldershot, Hampshire, England

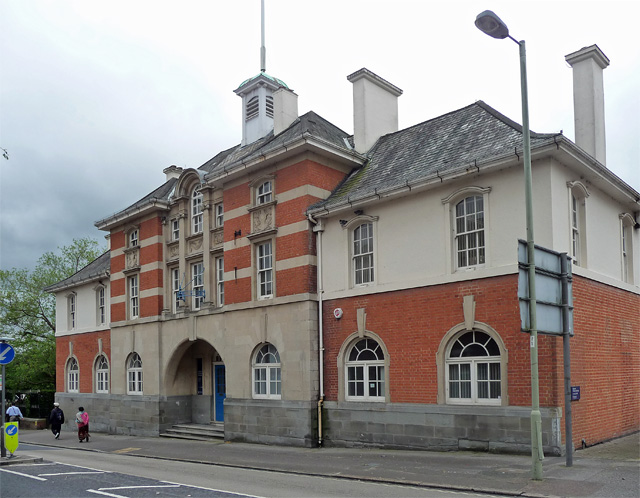
- Aldershot Town Hall

- Shown in Hampshire
- 51.2480°N 0.7670°W
- Location: Grosvenor Road, Aldershot

History
- Built: 1904

Site notes
- Architect: Charles E. Hutchinson
- Architectural style: Edwardian Baroque style

Listed Building – Grade II
- Official name: Aldershot Town Hall
- Designated: 9 October 1981
- Reference no.: 1092638

Aldershot Town Hall is a municipal building in Grosvenor Road, Aldershot, Hampshire, England. The town hall, which was the headquarters of Aldershot Borough Council, is a Grade II listed building.

== History ==
Following significant population growth associated with the rebuilding of the barracks to create Marlborough, Stanhope and Wellington Lines in 1890, the area became an urban district in 1896. In this context, the new council decided to procure a dedicated town hall; the site they selected was open land to the west of Grosvenor Road.

The new building was designed by Charles E. Hutchinson in the Edwardian Baroque style, built in red brick with Bath stone dressings and was completed in 1904. The design involved a symmetrical main frontage with seven bays facing onto Grosvenor Road; the central section of three bays, which slightly projected forward and benefited from an extra storey, featured an arched doorway on the ground floor and an elaborate centrepiece involving carved panels between the sash windows on first and second floors, flanked by Ionic order pilasters with an segmental canopy above. Extensive municipal gardens were laid out to the south east of the town hall and were opened at the same time. After the town was advanced to the status of municipal borough in 1922, a cenotaph commemorating the lives of service personnel who had died in the First World War was unveiled in the municipal gardens by the Duke of Gloucester on 18 March 1925.

On 21 April 1954, a military parade took place in front of the town hall to mark the centenary of the creation of Aldershot as the first permanent training camp for the British Army. The salute was taken by the mayor, Alderman Frederic Stay, supported by the General Officer Commanding, Aldershot Command, Major-General Sir Alexander Campbell.

The building continued to serve as the headquarters of Aldershot Borough Council for much of the 20th century but ceased to be the local seat of government when the enlarged Rushmoor Council was formed with its offices in Farnborough in 1974. The building was converted for use as a magistrates' court in 1981 and then converted again for use as offices for the Social Services Department of Hampshire County Council in 1992. The county council left the building in November 2017 and Rushmoor Council started work on converting the town hall into a hub for companies operating in the digital and computer games sector in March 2020.
