= 2027 Rushmoor Borough Council election =

2027 English local government election

- 6 May 2027

13 out of 39 seats Rushmoor Borough Council 20 seats needed for a majority
Leader	Gareth Williams	Steve Harden	Kevin Betsworth
Party	Labour	Conservative	Reform
Leader's seat	Empress	Fernhill	Rowhill
Last election	17 seats, 24.5%	10 seats, 23.7%	6 seats, 31.3%
Current seats	19	10	6
Leader	Craig Card
Party	Liberal Democrats	Independent
Leader's seat	St Mark's
Last election	3 seats, 7.4%	3 seats, 0.9%
Current seats	3	1
Incumbent Leader
Gareth Williams
Labour
No overall control (Note: Labour minority.)

The 2027 Rushmoor Borough Council election will be held on 6 May 2027 to elect members of Rushmoor Borough Council in Hampshire, England. This will be on the same day as other local elections held across the United Kingdom.

== Background ==
=== Local government reorganisation ===
Due to proposed structural changes to local government in England, the 2026 election was intended to be the final election to the council before it was abolished and replaced by North Hampshire Council, a new unitary authority.

However, on 7 September 2026, the government announced it was withdrawing plans for the planned restructuring pending review. Following this announcement, local elections due to be held in 2027 under the existing local electoral calendar would proceed.

== Summary ==
=== Election result ===
2027 Rushmoor Borough Council election
Party	This election				Full council			This election		
Party	Candidates	Seats	Net	Seats %	Other	Total	Total %	Votes	Votes %	+/−
Labour					12					
Conservative					7					
Reform					5					
Liberal Democrats					2					
Independent					0					

=== Incumbents ===
Ward	Incumbent councillor	Affiliation	Re-standing
Aldershot Park	Sophie Porter	Labour	
Cherrywood	Christine Guinness	Labour	
Cove & Southwood	Stephen Masterson	Conservative	
Empress	Gareth Williams	Labour	
Fernhill	Ian Simpson	Reform	
Knellwood	Calum Stewart	Independent	
Manor Park	Becky Williams	Labour	
North Town	Gaynor Austin	Labour	
Rowhill	Halleh Koohestani	Labour	
St John's	Peter Cullum	Conservative	
St Mark's	Thomas Mitchell	Liberal Democrats	
Wellington	Dhan Sarki	Labour	
West Heath	Gareth Lyon	Conservative	
