= Thomas Henry Sage =

English Victoria Cross recipient (1882–1945)

- Thomas Henry Sage VC in 1917
- Born: 8 December 1882; Tiverton, Devon
- Died: 20 July 1945 (aged 62); Tiverton
- Burial place: Tiverton Cemetery
- Military career
- Allegiance: United Kingdom
- Branch: British Army
- Rank: Private
- Units: The Somerset Light Infantry
- Conflicts: World War I
- Awards: Victoria Cross

Thomas Henry Sage VC (8 December 1882 – 20 July 1945) was a British Army soldier from Tiverton, Devon, and a recipient of the Victoria Cross (VC), the highest military decoration awarded for valor “in the face of the enemy” to members of the British and Commonwealth forces.

== Early life ==
Thomas Henry Sage was born in Tiverton, Devon, on 8 December 1882, Sage worked as a blacksmith before enlisting in the British Army. He married Evelyn Maud Langworthy on 5 August 1907, and the couple had two children, Beatrice and Clifford.

== Military service ==
Sage enlisted in the British Army on 10 December 1914 and was assigned as a private to the 8th Battalion, The Somerset Light Infantry (Prince Albert’s). This battalion was actively engaged on the Western Front during the First World War.

=== Victoria Cross action ===
On 4 October 1917, during the Battle of Passchendaele at Tower Hamlets Spur, east of Ypres, Belgium, Sage was in a shell-hole with eight other soldiers. Amidst heavy enemy fire, one of his comrades was shot while attempting to throw a grenade, causing it to fall back into their position. Sage threw himself onto the live grenade, absorbing the explosion and saving the lives of his fellow soldiers, though he sustained severe injuries.

Because of the severity of his wounds, it was believed that Sage would be unable to return to British lines. He was left with a revolver and advised not to allow himself to be captured. Despite his critical condition, he managed to survive and was later awarded the Victoria Cross for conspicuous bravery.

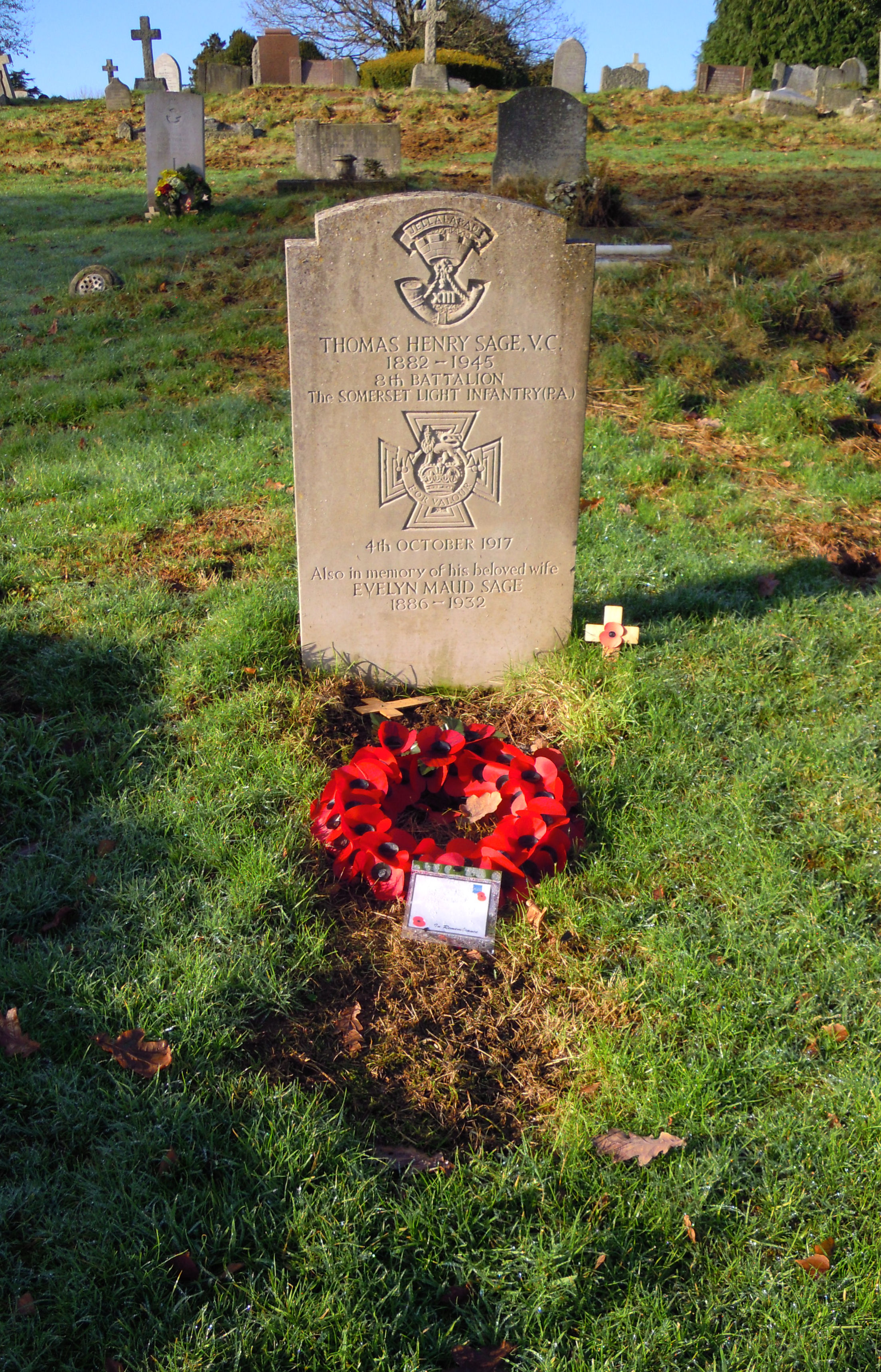
Sage's grave in Tiverton Cemetery

== Later life and death ==
After being discharged from the army on 24 May 1918, Sage returned to Tiverton. Despite his wounds, which included the loss of his right eye and multiple shrapnel fragments remaining in his body, Sage resumed civilian life. He lived with his wife and their children. Sage’s health remained compromised due to his wartime injuries, and he endured a prolonged illness before dying on 20 July 1945 at the age of 62. He was buried in Tiverton Cemetery.
