= North Hampshire =

- Proposed unitary authority area
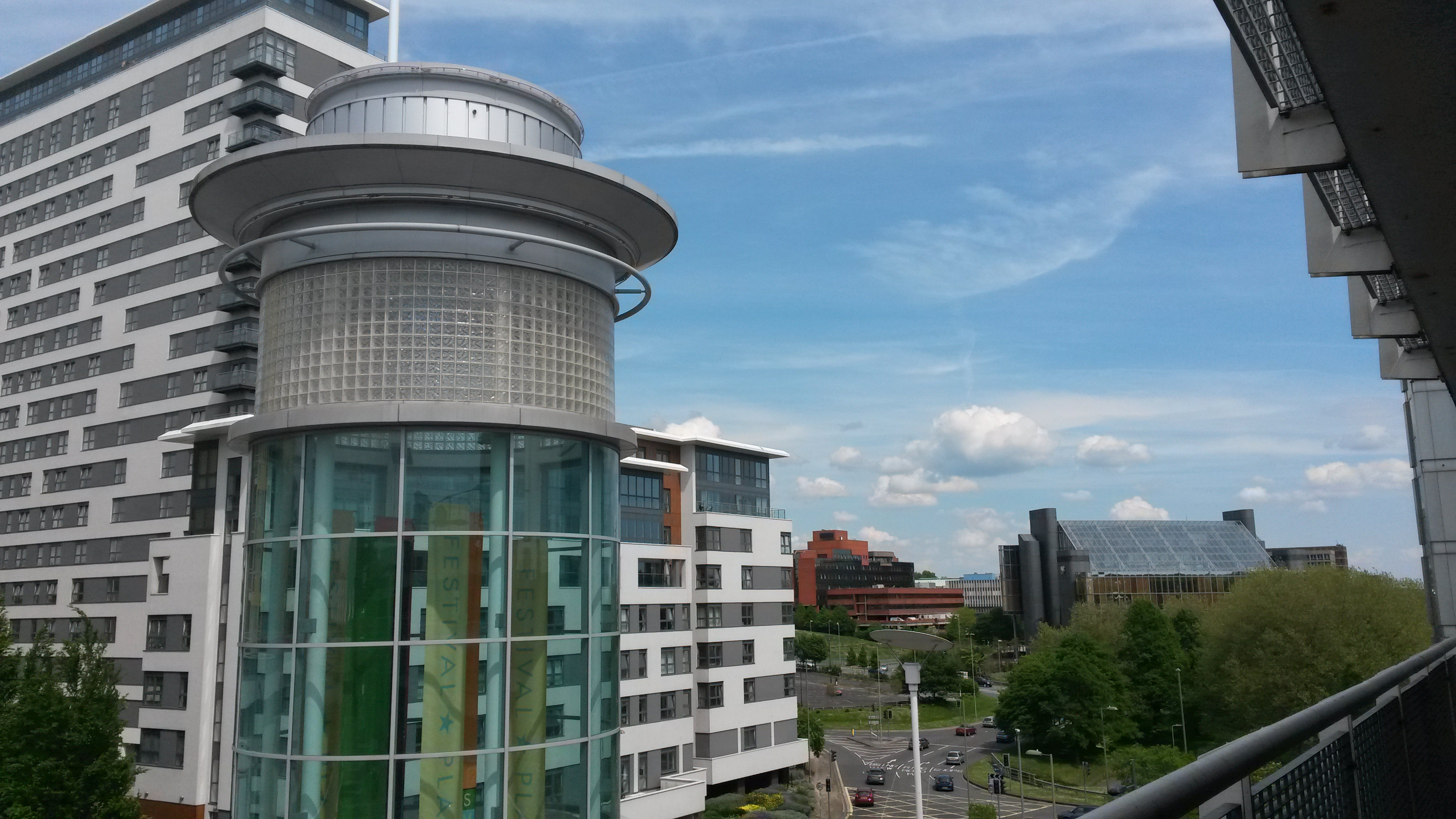
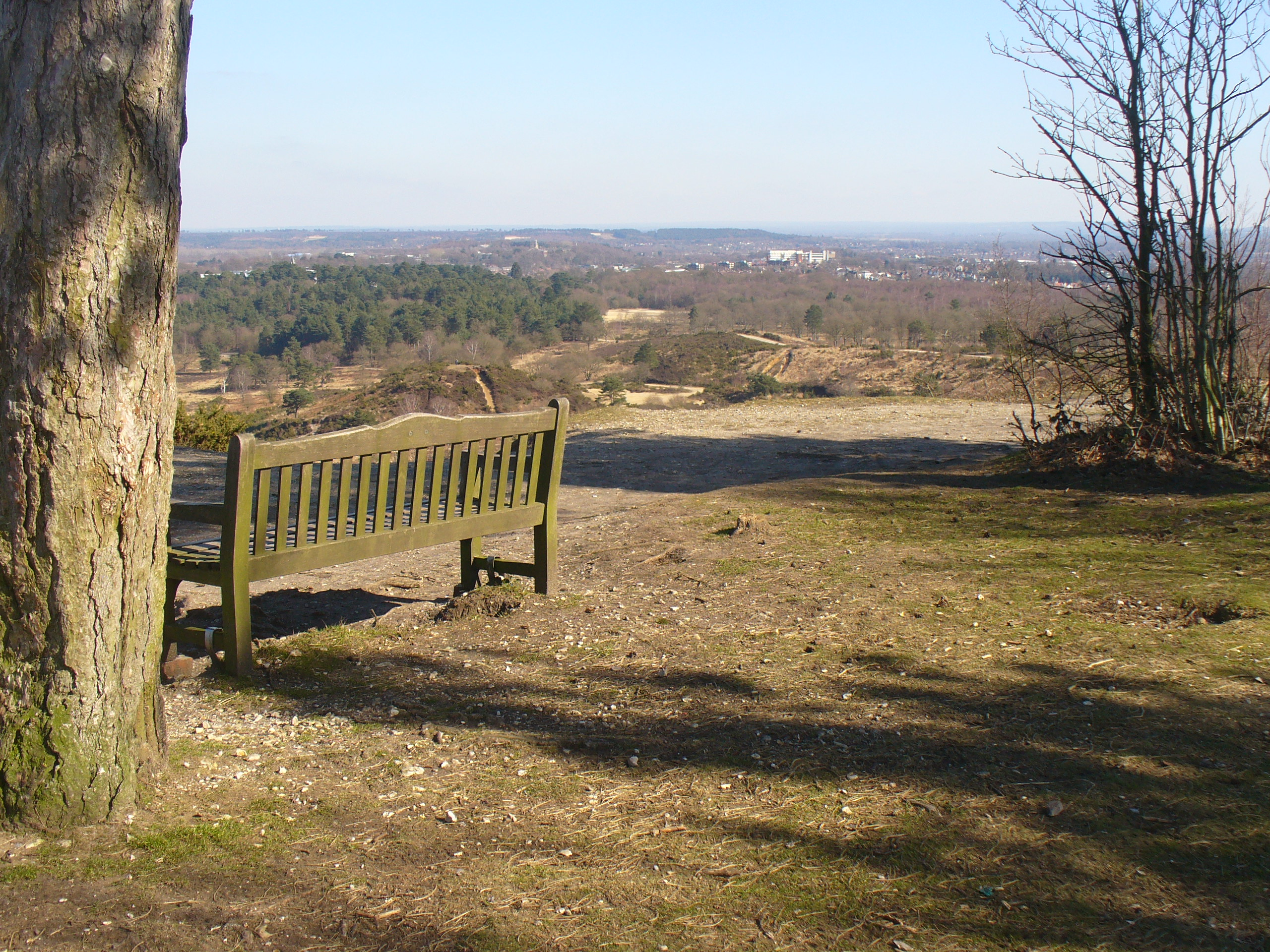
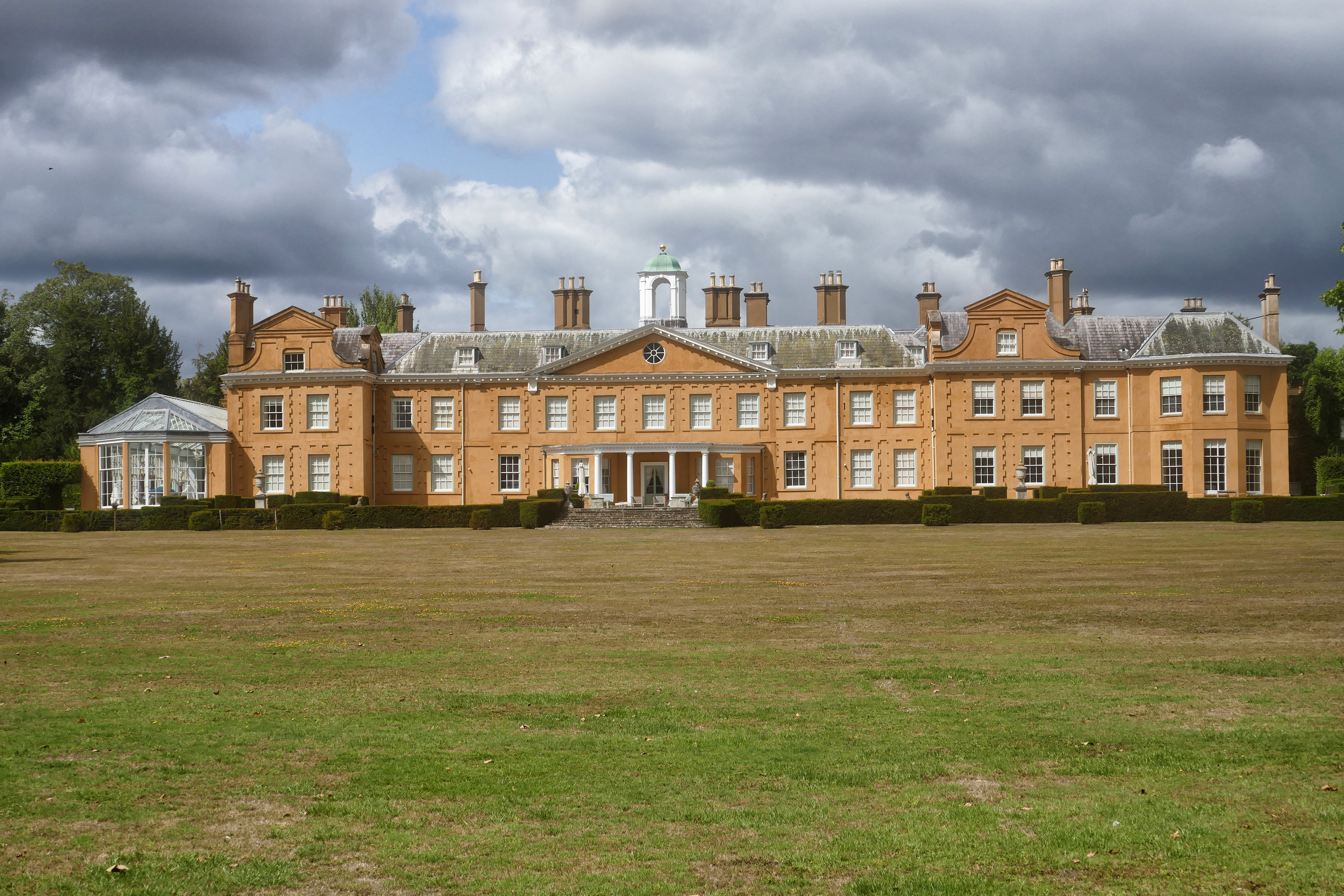
- Basingstoke town cente; Caesar's Camp, Aldershot; and Stratfield Saye House

- Interactive map
- Coordinates: 51.25°N 0.9°W
- Sovereign state: United Kingdom
- Country: England
- Region: South East
- Ceremonial county: Hampshire

Government
  - Type: Unitary authority
  - Body: North Hampshire Council

Population (2024 estimate)
  - Total: 402,023
- Time zone: UTC+0 (GMT)
  - Summer (DST): UTC+1 (BST)

North Hampshire was a proposed unitary authority area that was scheduled to be created in April 2028 in Hampshire, England, as part of ongoing local government reform. It would have been formed by a merger of the existing districts of Basingstoke and Deane, Hart, and Rushmoor, and would have included the towns of Basingstoke, Fleet, Aldershot, and Farnborough. Plans to create it were withdrawn in September 2026.

== Formation ==
It was due to be formed as part of ongoing local government changes throughout England, in which all areas of the country that have separate county councils and district councils will see those replaced with single-tier, or unitary, local governance.

The creation of the district was announced by the Ministry of Housing, Communities and Local Government on 25 March 2026. formed by a merger of the existing districts of Basingstoke and Deane, Hart, and Rushmoor, and would have included the towns of Basingstoke, Fleet, Aldershot, and Farnborough.

In September 2026, the Hampshire proposals were withdrawn by the government in light of new legal advice. The decision was threatened with judicial review by Hampshire County Council.

== Geography ==
The district would have bordered West Surrey to the east; Mid Hampshire to the south and west; West Berkshire, Wokingham and Bracknell Forest to the north.

The geography of the proposed district is mostly divided into two areas: the Hampshire Downs form the south-western part of the district, and Thames Basin Heaths form the north-eastern part. A small area in the south-eastern part of the district, around Aldershot, is in the Thames Basin Lowlands.

== Governance ==
The first councillors would have been elected in May 2027, and the new authority would have assumed full powers in April 2028. This election was cancelled in September 2026.
