= Mid Hampshire =

- Proposed unitary authority area
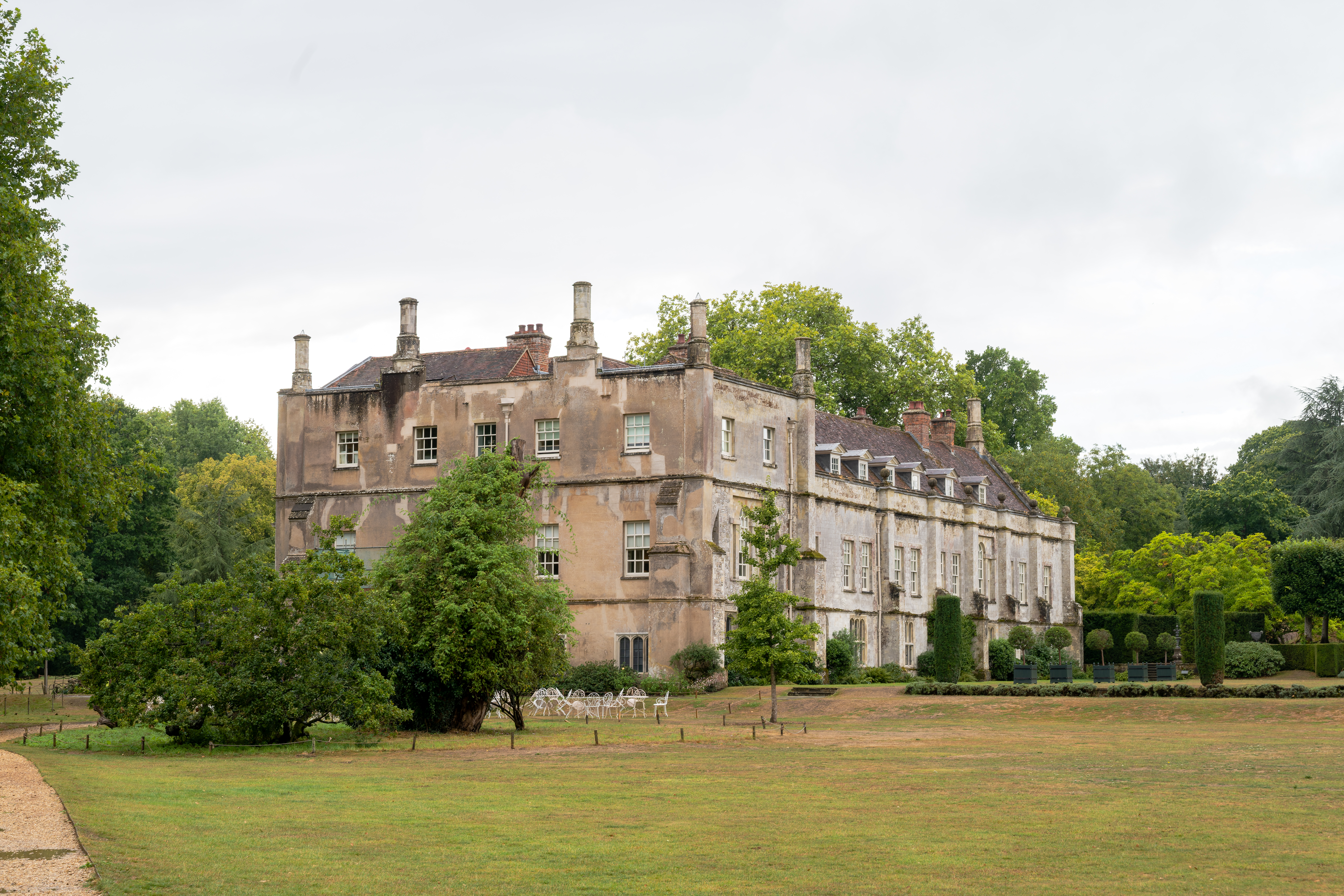
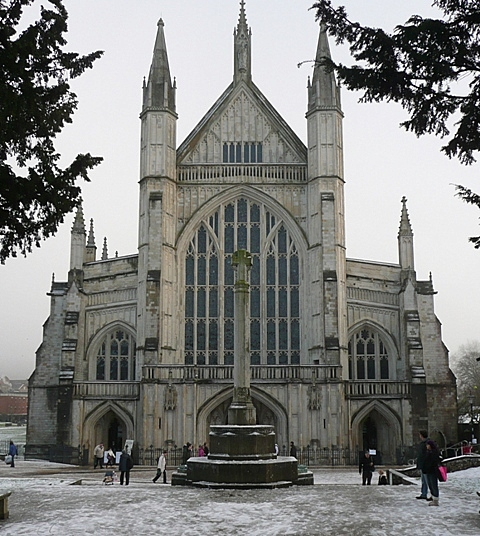
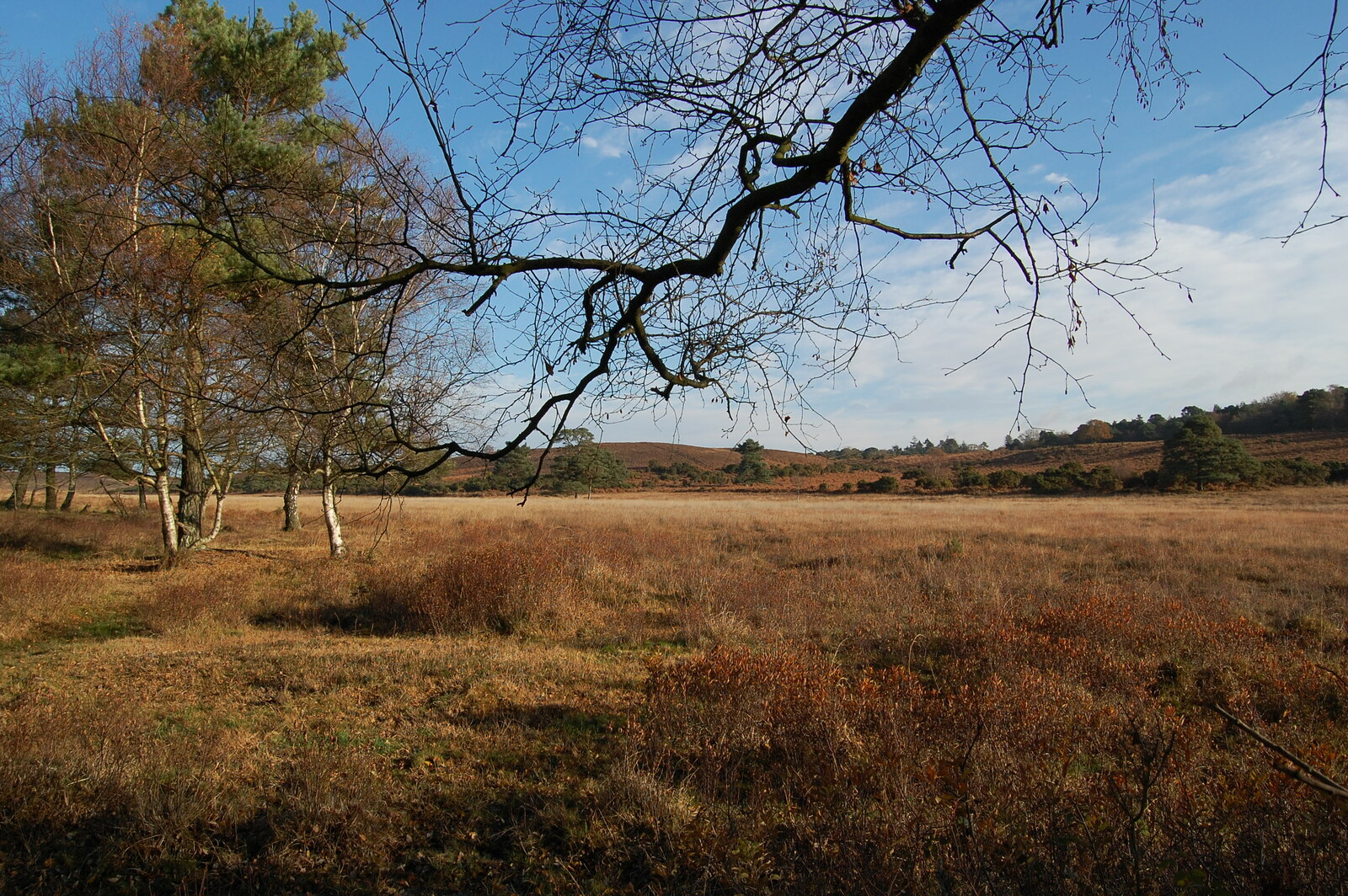
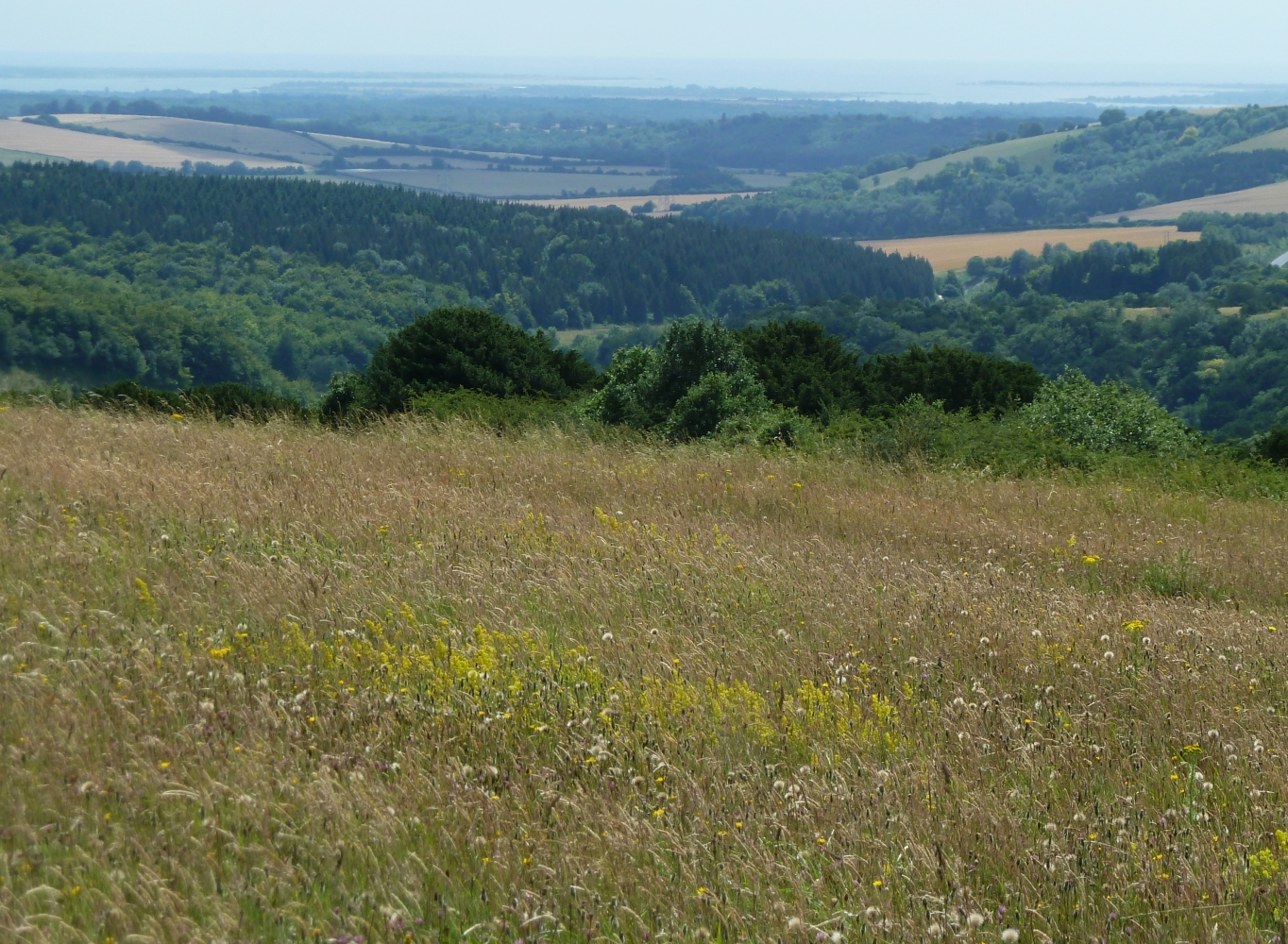
- Mottisfont Abbey, Winchester Cathedral, the New Forest and Butser Hill

- Interactive map
- Coordinates: 51.06°N 1.31°W
- Sovereign state: United Kingdom
- Country: England
- Region: South East
- Ceremonial county: Hampshire

Government
  - Type: Unitary authority
  - Body: Mid Hampshire Council

Population (2024 estimate)
  - Total: 465,630
- Time zone: UTC+0 (GMT)
  - Summer (DST): UTC+1 (BST)

Mid Hampshire was a proposed unitary authority area that was scheduled to be created in April 2028 in Hampshire, England, as part of ongoing local government reform. It would have been formed by a merger of most of the existing districts of the Winchester, New Forest, Test Valley, and East Hampshire, and would have included the city of Winchester, and various towns including Alton, Andover and Lymington.

Plans to create it were withdrawn in September 2026.

== History ==
In September 2026, the Hampshire proposals were withdrawn by the government in light of new legal advice. The decision was threatened with judicial review by Hampshire County Council.

== Geography ==
The proposed district's geography is diverse. The current local authority districts whose areas will make up Mid Hampshire (New Forest, Test Valley, City of Winchester and East Hampshire) cover seven of the national character areas defined by Natural England.

The seven national character areas which intersect with the current districts are:

- Dorset Downs and Cranborne Chase
- Dorset Heaths
- New Forest
- Hampshire Downs
- South Hampshire Lowlands
- South Downs
- South Coast Plain
- Wealden Greensand

The four constituting districts also have areas within two national parks (New Forest and the South Downs) and two further National Landscapes (North Wessex Downs and Cranborne Chase and West Wiltshire Downs).

As well as South West Hampshire and South East Hampshire, the district would border Bournemouth, Christchurch and Poole, Dorset and Wiltshire to the west; West Berkshire and North Hampshire to the north; and West Surrey and one or more planned unitary districts of West Sussex to the east.

Parts of all four districts near the South Hampshire urban area would have formed part of the South West Hampshire and South East Hampshire unitary authorities, which would have bordered Mid Hampshire to the south.

== Governance ==
The first councillors would have been elected to Mid Hampshire Council in May 2027, and the new authority would have been established in April 2028. This election was cancelled in September 2026.
