= Tiverton Cemetery =

Cemetery in Devon, England

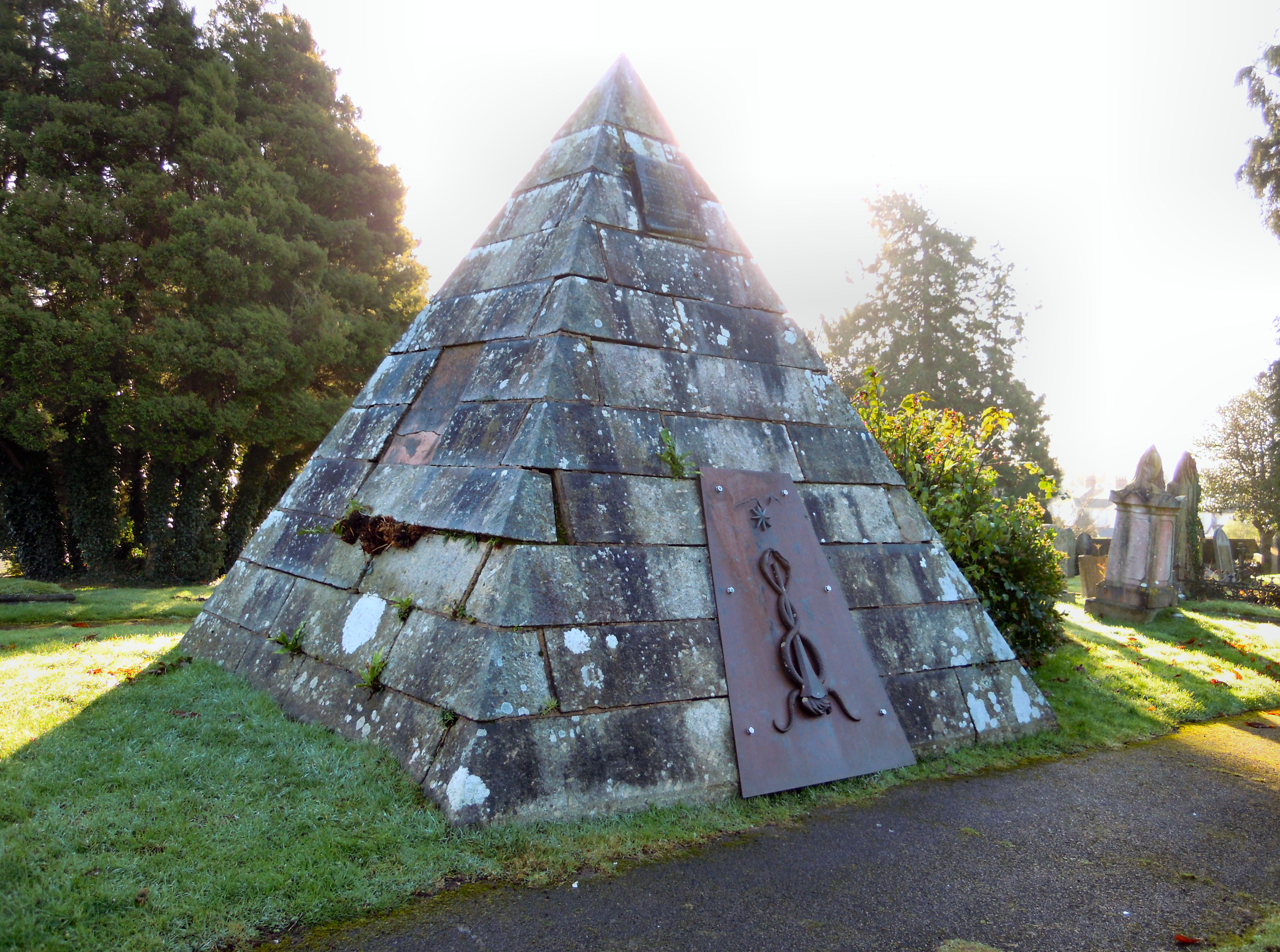
- The Stockdale Family pyramid tomb in Tiverton Cemetery

Details
- Established: 1855
- Location: Park Road, Tiverton, Devon EX16 6BA
- Country: England
- Coordinates: 50.9126°N 3.4842°W
- Type: Public
- Owned by: Mid Devon Council
- Size: 8 acres (3.2 ha)
- Find a Grave: Tiverton Cemetery

Tiverton Cemetery is the burial ground for the town of Tiverton in Devon. The cemetery covers eight acres and is owned and maintained by Mid Devon Council.

== History ==
Tiverton Cemetery opened in 1855 on a three-acre site following a rapid growth in population nationally and locally during the early Victorian era. The first burial occurred on 5 June 1855 and was of five-year-old Charles Harris from the Union Workhouse, the first of eight interments that week. In its early months the cemetery was used exclusively for burying the poor because those who could afford to preferred to be buried at St. Peter's Church in Tiverton. In December 1855 the first grave to be purchased was bought by George Askew, a local Tailor and Draper who had a triple wide vault built. By the 1860s graves were being bought by Tiverton's wealthier families and it was at this time that some of the cemetery's grandest monuments were built, at least one of which, that of William Rudall Haydon (c. 1845 – 1897) and other members of his family, is a Grade II listed monument.

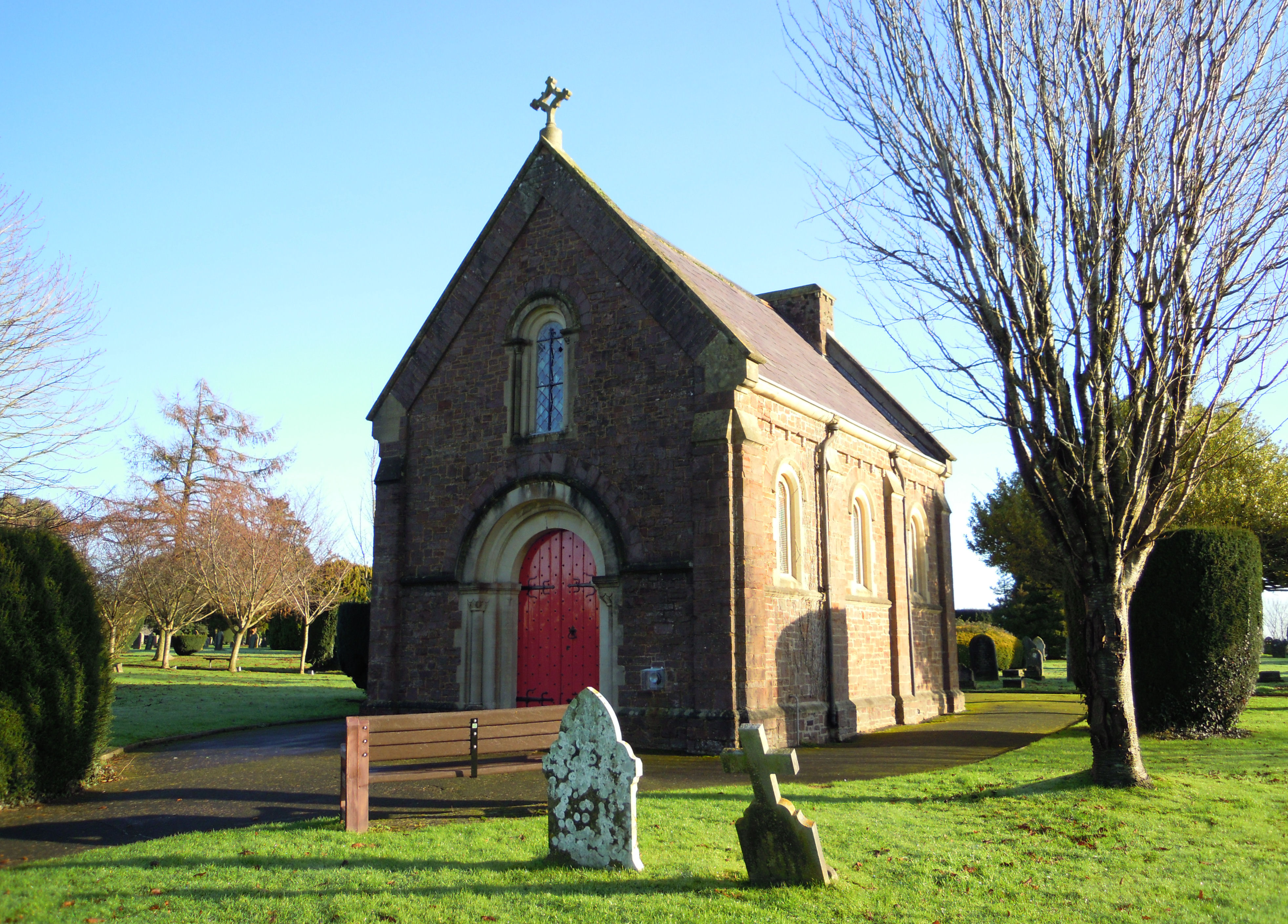
The surviving cemetery chapel is Grade II listed

By the middle of the 1880s the original cemetery was filling up and an adjoining plot of another three acres was purchased and opened in 1895. When this too was filled, burials moved to the 'new' cemetery which was laid out on former allotments in 1954. This has resulted in the old and new sections being divided by a narrow road which is now a private drive. The 'new' cemetery was extended in the 1980s to the east and later again into the last of the allotments. The last extension to the cemetery opened in 2013 and was consecrated by Nick McKinnel, the Bishop of Crediton.

The cemetery originally had two small chapels and the surviving chapel was for Church of England funerals; another chapel for nonconformist funerals stood a hundred yards to the north but this was demolished in the late 1970s. This surviving chapel is a Grade II listed building. The gates to the oldest part of the cemetery are also Grade II listed. The cemetery holds 13 burials from World War I and a further 21 burials from World War II which are maintained by the Commonwealth War Graves Commission.

== Notable burials ==
- Thomas Henry Sage (1882–1945), World War I recipient of the Victoria Cross
- Brigadier Alfred Toye (1897–1955), World War I recipient of the Victoria Cross

== Gallery ==
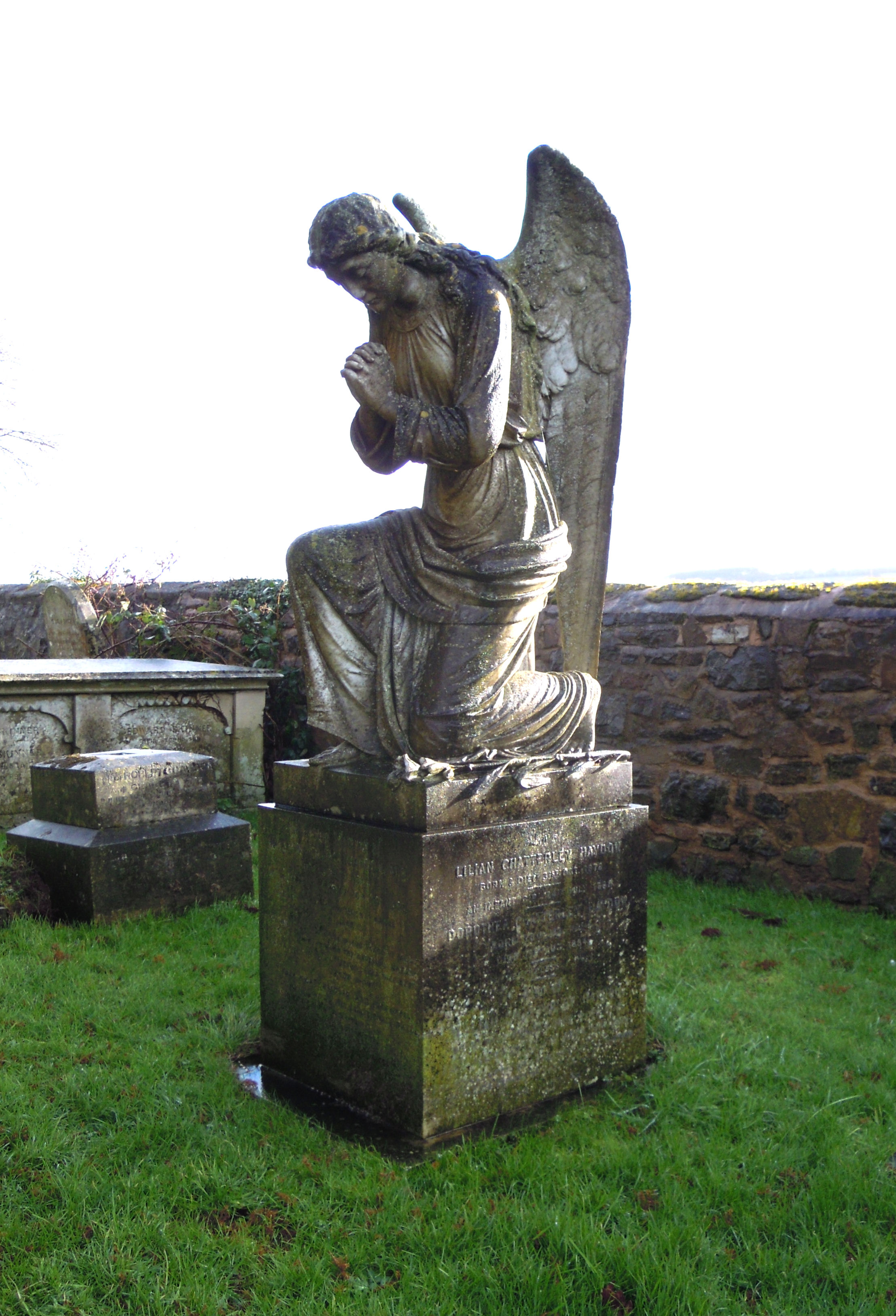
The Grade II listed Haydon Family memorial

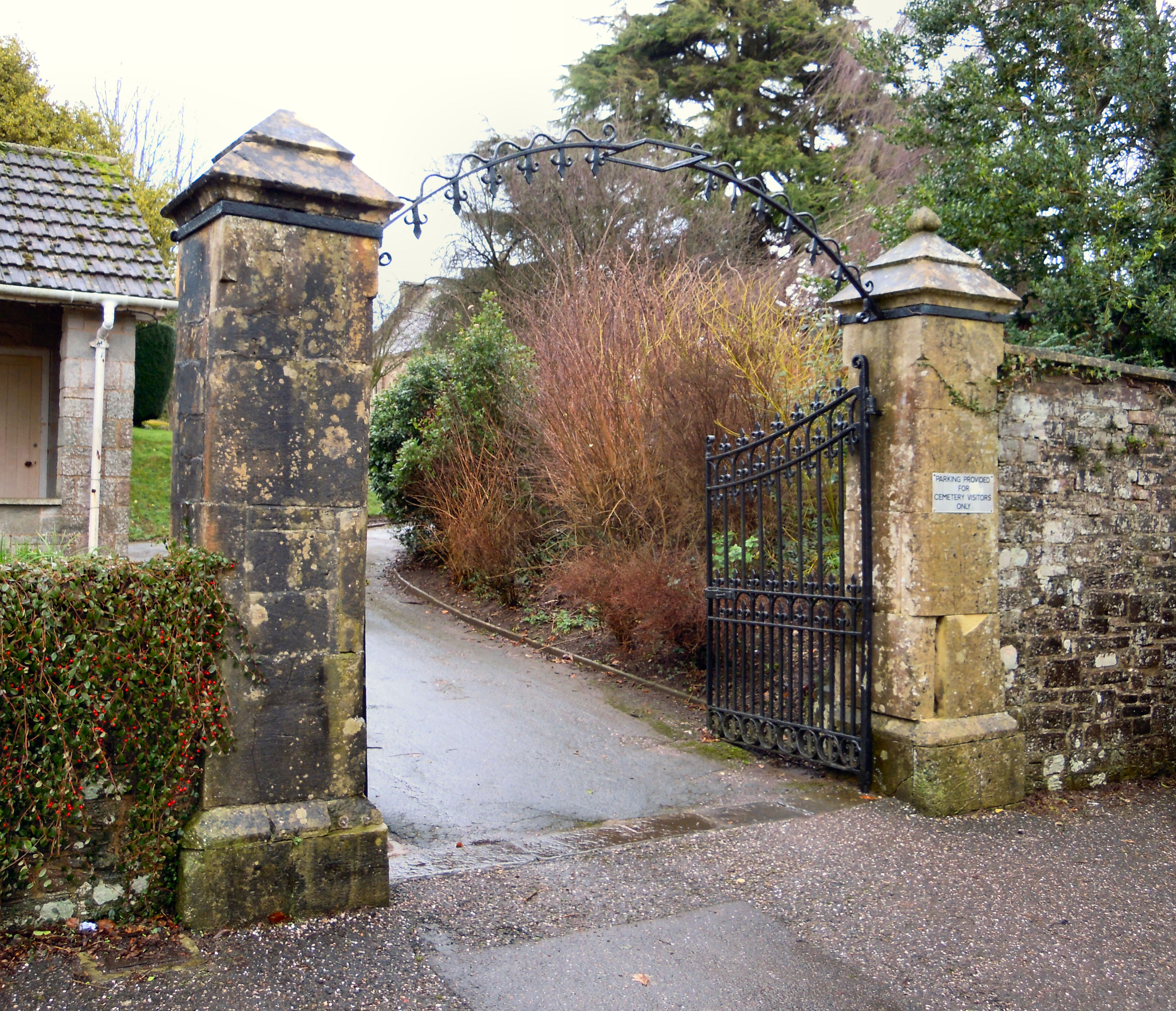
The Grade II listed cemetery gates

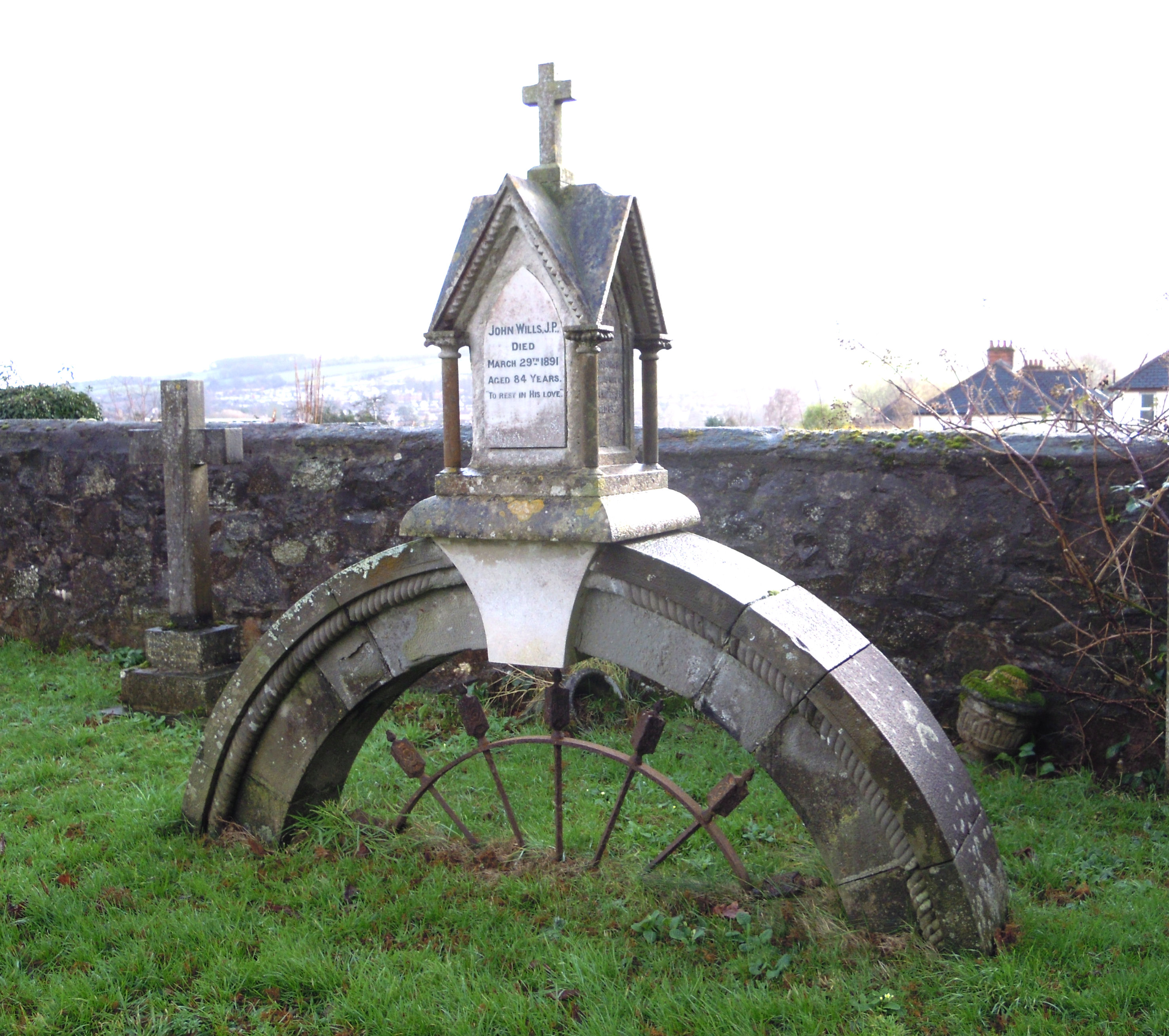
The unusual 'cartwheel' memorial to John Wills JP
