= Alfred Toye =

English Victoria Cross recipient (1897-1955)

Alfred Maurice Toye
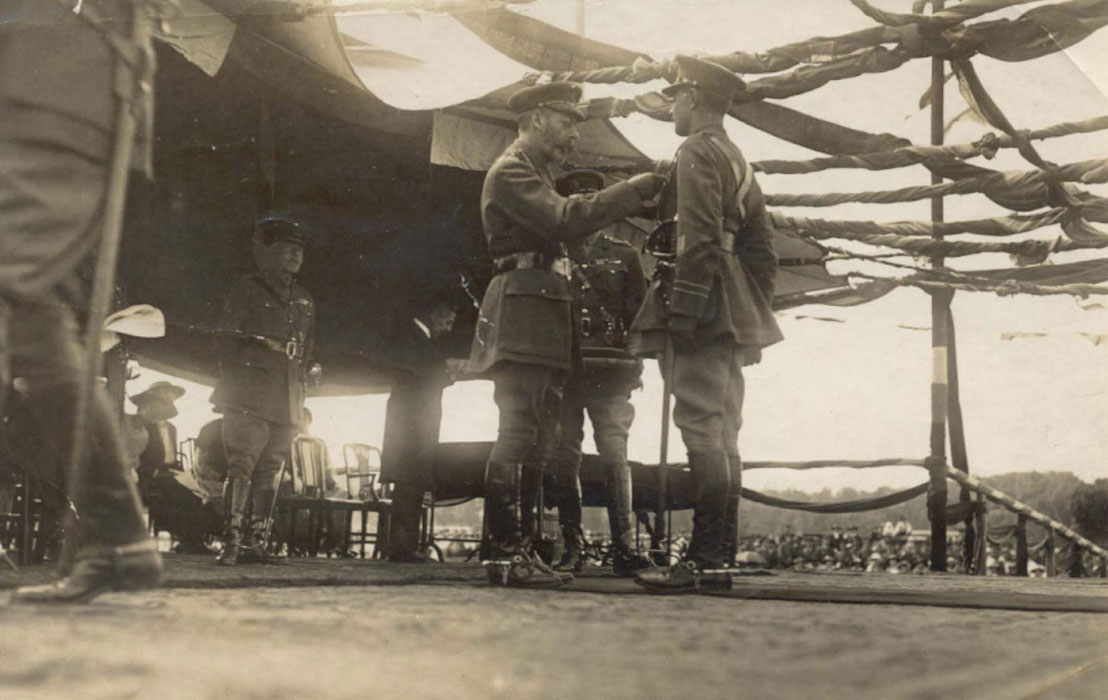
- Captain Alfred Maurice Toye (right) receiving his Victoria Cross from King George V in 1918.
- Born: 15 April 1897; Aldershot, Hampshire, England
- Died: 6 September 1955 (aged 58); Tiverton, Devon, England
- Burial place: Tiverton Cemetery
- Military career
- Allegiance: United Kingdom
- Branch: British Army
- Service years: 1912−1948
- Rank: Brigadier
- Service number: 1658
- Units: Royal Engineers; Middlesex Regiment; Oxfordshire and Buckinghamshire Light Infantry
- Conflicts: World War I World War II
- Awards: Victoria Cross; Military Cross; Order of the Nile

Brigadier Alfred Maurice Toye VC MC (15 April 1897, Aldershot – 6 September 1955, Tiverton, Devon) was an English recipient of the Victoria Cross, the highest and most prestigious award for gallantry in the face of the enemy that can be awarded to British and Commonwealth forces.

== Military career ==
Toye was born in Aldershot in 1897, the son of James Robert Toye (1854–1943), an Army Pensioner and Clerk, and Elizabeth Charlotte (née Dodds, 1862–1947). He was educated at the Garrison School in Aldershot before enlisting into the Royal Engineers as a bugler in 1912 before being commissioned into the Middlesex Regiment during World War I. Before joining the Army, Toye was an active Boy Scout, attaining the rank of patrol leader at the 2nd Aldershot Scout Troop. He was the first member of his troop to become a King's Scout.

He was 20 years old, and an acting British Army Captain in the 2nd Battalion, The Middlesex Regiment (Duke of Cambridge's Own), during the First World War when the following deed took place for which he was awarded the VC.

On 25 March 1918 at Eterpigny Ridge, France, Captain Toye displayed conspicuous bravery and fine leadership. He three times re-established a post which had been captured by the enemy and, when his three other posts were cut off, he fought his way through the enemy with one officer and six men. He counter-attacked with 70 men and took up a line which he maintained until reinforcements arrived. In two subsequent operations he covered the retirement of his battalion and later re-established a line that had been abandoned before his arrival. He was twice wounded but remained on duty.

== After the war ==
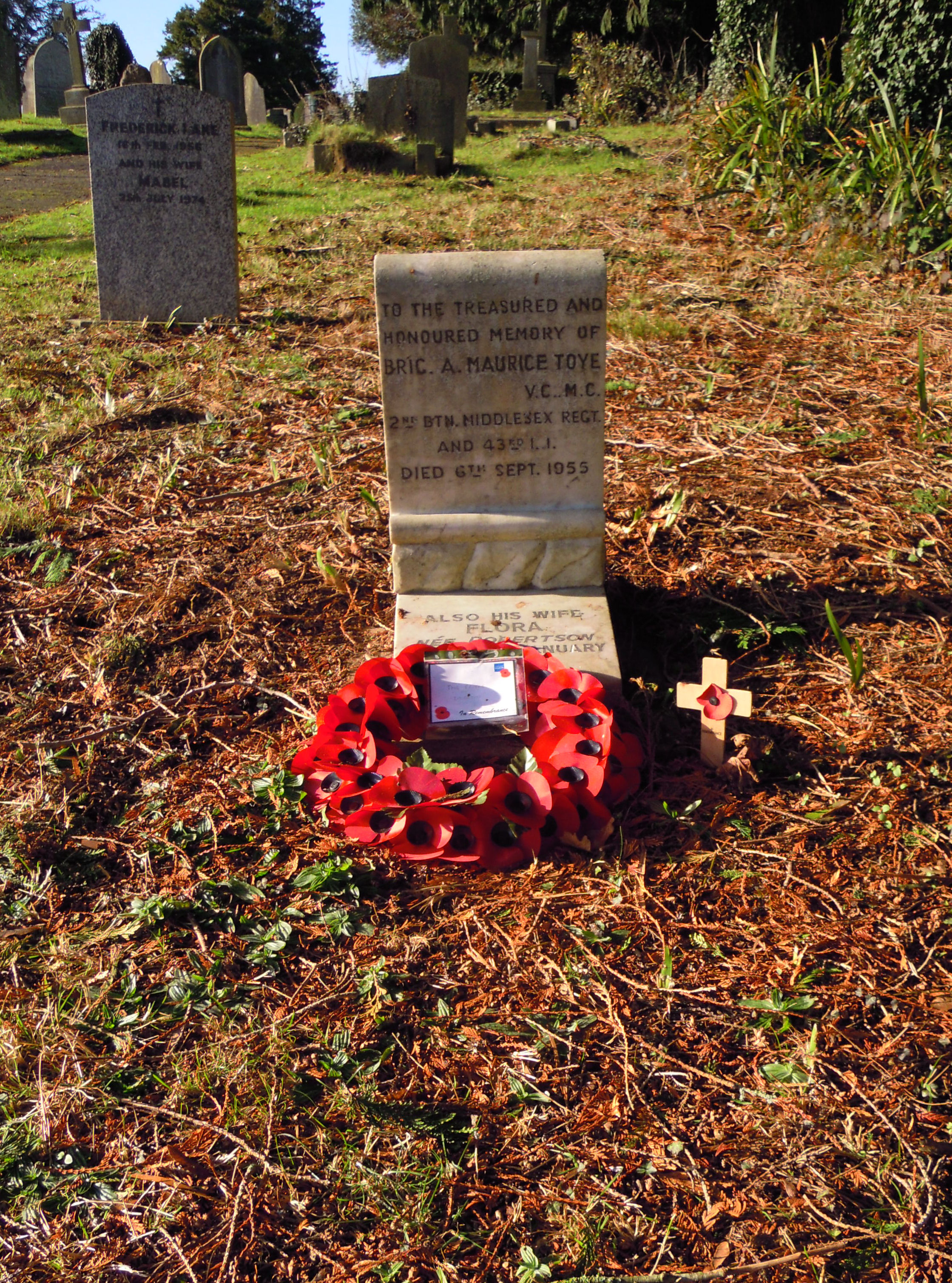
Toye's grave in Tiverton Cemetery in 2017

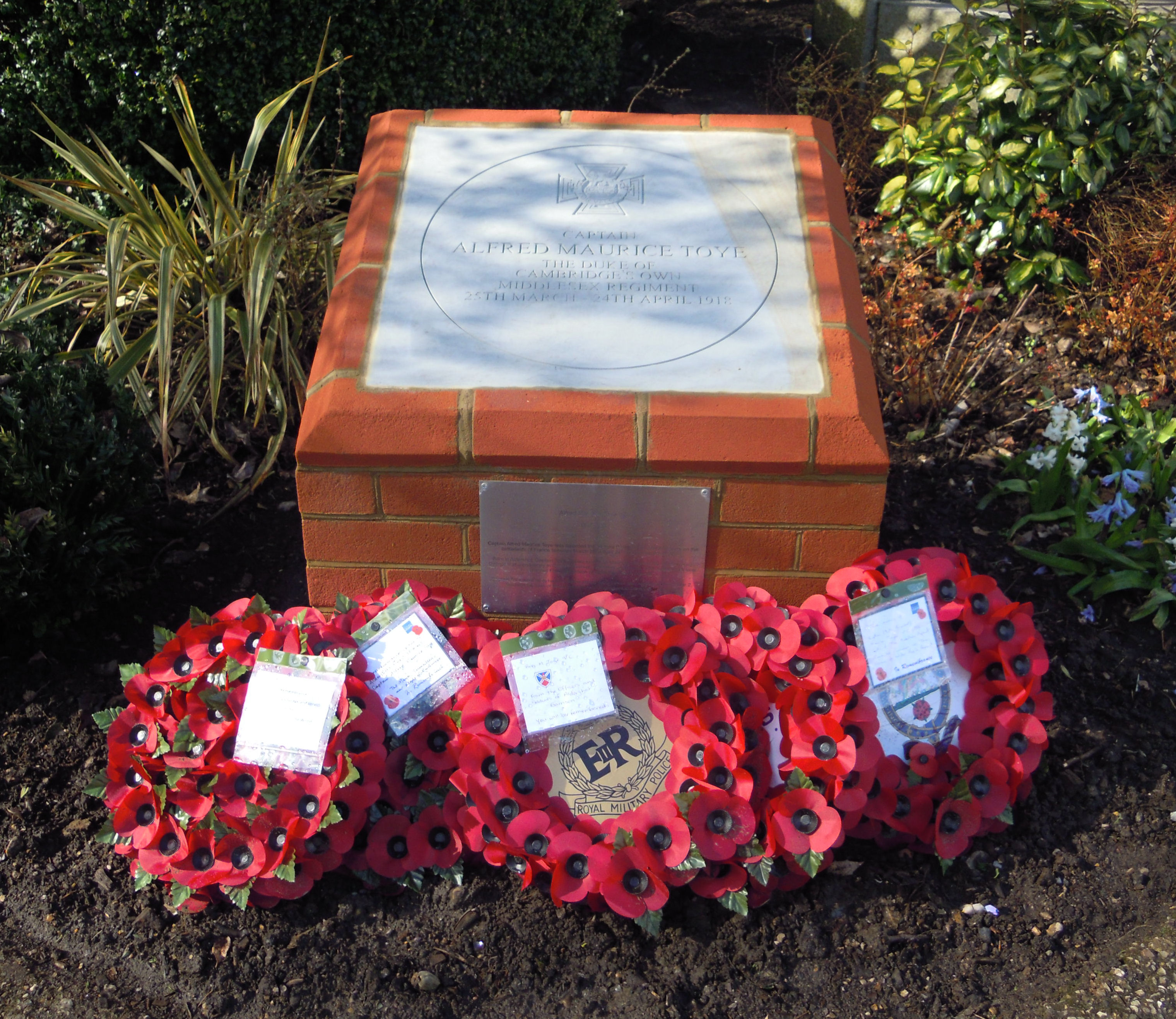
The memorial plaque to Toye in the Municipal Gardens in his native Aldershot

A week after his investiture with the VC at Aldershot he married Flora Robertson (1896-1979) at the Church of St Michael in his native Aldershot. They had two daughters, Joan Flora Toye (1920-2017) and Enid Audrey Toye (1925-2000). From 1925 to 1932 he was chief instructor at the Royal Egyptian Military College and Commandant of War Office Schools of Chemical Warfare 1940- 1942. Toye then joined the teaching staff at the Staff College, Camberley. From 1934 to 1944 he was on active service with the 6th Airborne Division and with General Headquarters, Middle East from 1945 to 1948. He later achieved the rank of Brigadier serving with the 6th Airborne Division in World War II.

He retired to Tiverton in Devon where he died of cancer in 1955 at the Madame Curie Memorial Foundation at Tidcombe Hall in Tiverton and is buried in Tiverton Cemetery.

On 25 March 2018, on the 100th anniversary of the action in which he won his Victoria Cross during World War I, a memorial to Toye was unveiled in the Municipal Gardens in his native Aldershot.

== Victoria Cross ==
His VC is displayed at the National Army Museum, Chelsea, England.

== Bibliography ==
- Monuments to Courage (David Harvey, 1999)
- Buzzell, Nora, ed. (1997). The Register of the Victoria Cross. Cheltenham: This England Alma House. ISBN 0-906324-27-0.
- Napier, Gerald (1998). The Sapper VCs: The Story of Valour in the Royal Engineers and Its Associated Corps. The Stationery Office. ISBN 978-0117728356.
- Gliddon, Gerald (2013) [2004]. Spring Offensive 1918. VCs of the First World War. Stroud, Gloucestershire: The History Press. ISBN 978-0-7524-8730-4.
- Oldfield, Paul (2019). Victoria Crosses on the Western Front: Continuation of the German 1918 Offensives, 24 March–24 July 1918. Pen and Sword Books. ISBN 978-1-4738-2710-3.
