= Aldershot riot (1945) =

1945 riot by Canadian troops in England

Canadian troops riot on the High Street in Aldershot in July 1945

The Aldershot riot occurred on the evenings of 4 and 5 July 1945 when Canadian troops of the Canadian Army Overseas tired of waiting to be repatriated rioted in the streets of Aldershot in Hampshire, causing considerable damage to property.

== Riot ==
=== 4 July ===
On Wednesday 4 July 1945 a rumour quickly spread among the 30,000 Canadian troops stationed in the area that three soldiers of the Canadian Army were in custody in Aldershot Police station. About five hundred Canadian soldiers travelled on foot from their barracks to the police station, smashing shop windows along the route. After receiving assurances that there were no Canadians in the jail, the crowd dispersed. Other rioters were simply bored with garrison life and got involved in protest at the delay in being returned home two months after the end of World War II in Europe.

=== 5 July ===
The rioters returned again on the evening of 5 July and gathered in Princes Gardens before marching on Union Street, where they threw bricks and stones at cars, smashed the remaining undamaged shop windows, threatened shopkeepers and broke into a brewery where they helped themselves to the stock. The Canadian Military Police tried to forcibly quell the riot, which continued for more than two hours, ending around midnight. A Canadian officer who tried to send them back to their barracks told them, "You are giving Canada a bad name. Canadians are getting a fair share of boats but the shipping position is most difficult." In total about £10,000 in damages was caused over the two evenings.

In 2016 four postcards sent by a Canadian soldier who had been an eyewitness to the riots were published for the first time. Canadian Trooper George Karkus described the riots to his parents stating that "the boys got tired of waiting and some of them were waiting for two months." Karkus adds that 611 window frames were smashed and only £20 taken during the riots. He wrote that after the riots each Canadian camp had anti-riot squads, of which he was in one, while in Aldershot "where two roads cross there were sixteen policemen, four on each corner they worked in groups of four but by then they moved a few thousand of the worst ones out things were kind of quiet."

== Aftermath ==
Cleaning up Union Street in Aldershot after the riot

A Cabinet meeting held on 6 July discussed the riots of the previous two days, with Prime Minister Winston Churchill demanding to know "Why could we not keep better order? Had we no British troops to call in to restore order? Where was our military police? Were we going to let these wild Canadians break up the homes of these poor innocent shopkeepers?" Churchill's military adviser Field Marshal Lord Alanbrooke replied that it would have been "only as a very last resort that I should order British troops to rough handle Canadians who are giving trouble... In such cases Canadians must deal with their own nationals. Even British Red Cap police must be kept out of it."

One hundred Canadian soldiers were tried by courts-martial, and five received sentences ranging from two years with hard labour to seven years penal servitude. By 31 March 1946 the Canadian government had paid $41,541 to meet the costs of repairing the damage in Aldershot. Lieutenant-General John Percival "Price" Montague (1882-1966) of the Canadian Army Overseas believed that the riot's ringleaders were men who had volunteered for the Pacific Force in the expectation of being repatriated quickly calling these men "...I cannot describe otherwise than as racketeers". Of the soldiers convicted by courts-martial as a result of the riots three were Pacific volunteers. Most of the convicted men already had long records of misconduct. In a gesture of forgiveness and goodwill the people of Aldershot granted "the Freedom of the Borough of Aldershot" to the Canadian Army Overseas on 26 September 1945.
