= 2026 Rushmoor Borough Council election =

2026 local government election in Rushmoor

- 7 May 2026

14 out of 39 seats to Rushmoor Borough Council (including 1 by-election) 20 seats needed for a majority
- Registered: 67,392
- Turnout: 28,287; 42.0%
	First party	Second party	Third party
Leader	Gareth Williams	Gareth Lyon	Kevin Betsworth
Party	Labour	Conservative	Reform
Last election	21 seats, 48.1%	15 seats, 36.8%	0 seats, 3.6%
Seats before	17 (Note: Includes the vacant seat in Fernhill ward last held by Labour.)	14	0
Seats won	3	4	6
Seats after	17	10	6
Seat change	Steady	▼4	▲6
Popular vote	7,277	7,054	9,310
Percentage	24.5%	23.7%	31.3%
Swing	▼23.6%	▼13.1%	▲27.7%
	Fourth party	Fifth party	Sixth party
Leader	Craig Card
Party	Liberal Democrats	Independent	Green
Last election	3 seats, 10.1%	Did not stand	Did not stand
Seats before	3	4	1
Seats won	1	0	0
Seats after	3	3	0
Seat change	Steady	▼1	▼1
Popular vote	2,196	256	3,520
Percentage	7.4%	0.9%	11.8%
Swing	▼2.7%	N/A	N/A
- Winner of each seat at the 2026 Rushmoor Borough Council election.
Leader before election
Gareth Williams
Labour
No overall control (Note: Labour minority.)
Leader after election
Gareth Williams
Labour
No overall control (Note: Labour minority.)

The 2026 Rushmoor Borough Council election took place on 7 May 2026 to elect councillors to Rushmoor Borough Council in Hampshire, England. The election was held on the same day as other local elections across England.

Prior to the election, the council was under no overall control. The largest party was Labour, and they ran the council as a minority administration. The council remained under no overall control at this election. Labour's minority administration continued after the election.

Rushmoor Borough Council is elected by thirds. One councillor in each of the borough’s 13 wards will be elected, with councillors serving four-year terms. The seats contested at this election were last contested in 2022.

== Summary ==
=== Background ===
In the previous 2024 election, the Labour Party gained control of the council for the first time, winning a majority of seats from the Conservative Party.

During the 2024–2026 council term, several councillors changed their party affiliation. Some Labour councillors resigned from the party in 2025, citing differences over local priorities and governance, forming the Rushmoor Independent Group. This led to the council falling into no overall control, with the Labour group holding power as a minority administration.

=== Election result ===
2026 Rushmoor Borough Council election
Party	This election				Full council			This election		
Party	Candidates	Seats	Net	Seats %	Other	Total	Total %	Votes	Votes %	+/−
Labour	{{{candidates}}}	3	Steady	21.4	14	17	43.6	7,277	24.5	-23.6
Conservative	{{{candidates}}}	4	▼4	28.6	6	10	25.6	7,054	23.7	-13.1
Reform	{{{candidates}}}	6	▲6	42.9	0	6	15.4	9,310	31.3	+27.7
Liberal Democrats	{{{candidates}}}	1	Steady	7.1	2	3	7.7	2,196	7.4	-2.7
Independent	{{{candidates}}}	0	▼1	0.0	3	3	7.7	256	0.9	N/A
Green	{{{candidates}}}	0	▼1	0.0	0	0	0.0	3,520	11.8	N/A
British Democrats	{{{candidates}}}	0	Steady	0.0	0	0	0.0	66	0.2	N/A
TUSC	{{{candidates}}}	0	Steady	0.0	0	0	0.0	36	0.1	-0.9

== Ward results ==
Incumbent councillors standing for re-election are marked with an asterisk. (*)

=== Aldershot Park ===
Aldershot Park
Party	Candidate	Votes	%	±%
Reform	Sharon Harvey	678	38.4	N/A
Labour	Delian Bratosin	556	31.5	−36.9
Conservative	Peter Crerar	269	15.2	−9.2
Green	Sam Morrell	240	13.6	N/A
TUSC	Thomas Mortimer	24	1.4	−5.7
Majority		122	6.9	N/A
Turnout		1,767	35.7	+8.9
Registered electors		4,978		
Reform gain from Green				

=== Cherrywood ===
Cherrywood
Party	Candidate	Votes	%	±%
Reform	Sally McGuinness	557	31.4	N/A
Labour	Clive Grattan*	527	29.7	−31.8
Conservative	Anil Thapa	474	26.7	−5.6
Green	Daryl Higgs	215	12.1	N/A
Majority		30	1.7	N/A
Turnout		1,770	35.8	+4.8
Registered electors		4,973		
Reform gain from Labour				

=== Cove & Southwood ===
Cove & Southwood
Party	Candidate	Votes	%	±%
Conservative	Martin Tennant*	719	30.3	−19.2
Reform	Martin Laney	671	28.3	N/A
Labour	Becky Miles	481	20.3	−19.6
Green	Andy Wilson	308	13.0	N/A
Liberal Democrats	Jill Whyman	192	8.1	−2.5
Majority		48	2.0	−7.6
Turnout		2,377	43.0	+8.5
Registered electors		5,524		
Conservative hold				

=== Empress ===
Empress
Party	Candidate	Votes	%	±%
Labour	Nicky Slater	728	31.0	−14.3
Conservative	Abjeet Rudh	557	23.7	−11.3
Reform	Rohin Shingadia	551	23.5	+15.9
Liberal Democrats	Olive O'Dowd-Booth	284	12.1	+0.1
Green	Ryan Salisbury	229	9.7	N/A
Majority		171	7.3	−3.0
Turnout		2,362	46.5	+5.0
Registered electors		5,079		
Labour gain from Conservative		Swing	▼1.5	

=== Fernhill ===
Fernhill (2 seats due to by-election)
Party	Candidate	Votes	%	±%
Reform	Robert Matthews	798	43.6	N/A
Reform	Ian Simpson	723	39.5	N/A
Conservative	Akmal Gani*	714	39.0	−6.8
Liberal Democrats	Brian Blewett	338	18.5	+9.6
Labour	Barry Jones	287	15.7	−29.6
Labour	Madi Jabbi	278	15.2	−30.1
Green	Angela Walters	270	14.8	N/A
Green	Stephen Thayer	251	13.7	N/A
Turnout		2,054	40.5	+7.8
Registered electors		5,077		
Reform gain from Conservative				
Reform gain from Labour				

=== Knellwood ===
Knellwood
Party	Candidate	Votes	%	±%
Conservative	Mara Makunura*	918	31.8	−8.7
Reform	Amanda O'Neill	759	26.3	N/A
Liberal Democrats	Alan Hilliar	476	16.5	−5.1
Labour	Tad Cragg	419	14.5	−19.5
Green	Jules Crossley*	315	10.9	N/A
Majority		159	5.5	−1.0
Turnout		2,907	51.5	+12.6
Registered electors		5,642		
Conservative hold				

=== Manor Park ===
Manor Park
Party	Candidate	Votes	%	±%
Conservative	Jib Belbase	891	34.9	−6.7
Reform	Ken Tranter	623	24.4	+14.8
Labour	Catherine Njenga	572	22.4	−24.0
Green	Julia Rai	282	11.1	N/A
Liberal Democrats	Mark Trotter	171	6.7	N/A
TUSC	Keri Andrews	12	0.5	−1.8
Majority		263	10.3	N/A
Turnout		2,565	46.8	+6.7
Registered electors		5,485		
Conservative hold		Swing	▼10.8	

=== North Town ===
North Town
Party	Candidate	Votes	%	±%
Labour	Sarah Spall*	903	45.8	−36.6
Reform	Ken Weller	764	38.7	N/A
Green	Jules Rai	305	15.5	N/A
Majority		139	7.0	−57.8
Turnout		2,001	39.1	+12.3
Registered electors		5,116		
Labour hold				

=== Rowhill ===
Results
Party	Candidate	Votes	%	±%
Reform	Kevin Betsworth	768	33.7	+21.1
Labour	Fouzia Khan	746	32.7	−19.2
Conservative	Simon Birtwistle	401	17.6	−9.2
Green	Nick Stamp	301	13.2	N/A
British Democrats	Zack Culshaw	66	2.9	N/A
Majority		22	1.0	N/A
Turnout		2,302	46.3	+7.8
Registered electors		4,972		
Reform gain from Conservative		Swing	▲20.2	

=== St John's ===
St John's
Party	Candidate	Votes	%	±%
Reform	Dave Bell	719	32.7	N/A
Conservative	Stuart Trussler*	656	29.9	−12.9
Labour	Julia Warner	558	25.4	−23.1
Green	Fred Morris	264	12.0	N/A
Majority		63	2.7	N/A
Turnout		2,204	44.1	+10.4
Registered electors		4,997		
Reform gain from Conservative				

=== St Mark's ===
St Mark's
Party	Candidate	Votes	%	±%
Liberal Democrats	Craig Card*	603	28.3	−14.2
Reform	Joey Noyce	591	27.7	N/A
Conservative	Edd Bartlett	405	19.0	−17.3
Green	Zak Khan	296	13.9	N/A
Labour	Alex Day	236	11.1	−10.1
Majority		12	0.6	−5.6
Turnout		2,160	38.9	+9.3
Registered electors		5,552		
Liberal Democrats hold				

=== Wellington ===
Wellington
Party	Candidate	Votes	%	±%
Labour	Uttar Gurung	551	33.3	−24.1
Reform	Lisa Patterson	459	27.7	N/A
Conservative	Bishal Gurung	389	23.5	−15.3
Independent	Nadia Martin*	256	15.5	N/A
Majority		92	5.6	−13.0
Turnout		1,667	31.7	+4.5
Registered electors		5,264		
Labour gain from Independent				

=== West Heath ===
West Heath
Party	Candidate	Votes	%	±%
Conservative	Ade Adeola*	661	31.2	−7.2
Reform	Chris Harding	649	30.6	+19.8
Labour	Jahangir Firoz	435	20.5	−20.3
Green	Ed Neville	244	11.5	N/A
Liberal Democrats	James Read	132	6.2	−3.8
Majority		12	0.6	N/A
Turnout		2,133	45.1	+9.1
Registered electors		4,733		
Conservative hold		Swing	▼13.5	

== By-elections ==
=== Wellington ===
Wellington by-election: 16 July 2026 Resignation of Usman Ahmad (Labour)
Party	Candidate	Votes	%	±%
Labour	Fouzia Khan	408	42.1	+8.8
Conservative	Prabesh KC	199	20.5	−3.0
Reform	Rohin Shingadia	196	20.2	−7.5
Green	Andy Wilson	118	12.2	N/A
Liberal Democrats	Christopher Peart	49	5.1	N/A
Majority		209	21.5	+15.9
Turnout		970	18.0	−13.7
Registered electors		~5,389		
Labour hold		Swing	▲5.9	
