= Rushmoor =

Coordinates: 51°16′38.83″N 0°46′17.44″W

- Borough and non-metropolitan district
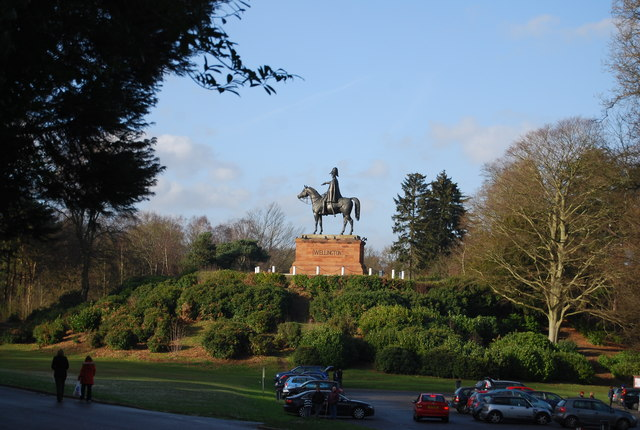
- Wellington Monument in Aldershot

- Rushmoor shown within Hampshire
- Sovereign state: United Kingdom
- Constituent country: England
- Region: South East England
- Non-metropolitan county: Hampshire
- Status: Non-metropolitan district
- Admin HQ: Farnborough
- Incorporated: 1 April 1974

Government
  - Type: Non-metropolitan district council
  - Body: Rushmoor Borough Council
  - MPs: Alex Baker

Area
  - Total: 15.1 sq mi (39.0 km^{2})
  - Rank: 263rd (of 296)

Population (2025)
  - Total: 106,185
  - Rank: 235th (of 296)
  - Density: 7,050/sq mi (2,720/km^{2})

Ethnicity (2021)
  - Ethnic groups: List: 77.4% White; 14.7% Asian; 2.8% other; 2.6% Mixed; 2.5% Black

Religion (2021)
  - Religion: List: 42.3% Christianity; 37.9% no religion; 5.3% not stated; 5.7% Hinduism; 4.7% Buddhism; 2.5% Islam; 1.2% other; 0.2% Sikhism; 0.1% Judaism
- Time zone: UTC0 (GMT)
  - Summer (DST): UTC+1 (BST)
- ONS code: 24UL (ONS); E07000092 (GSS)
- OS grid reference: SU8567753918

Rushmoor is a local government district with borough status in Hampshire, England. It covers the towns of Farnborough and Aldershot, the former of which is the location of the council.

The neighbouring districts are Hart, Surrey Heath, Guildford and Waverley.

== History ==
The district was created on 1 April 1974 under the Local Government Act 1972, covering the whole area of two former districts, which were both abolished at the same time:

- Aldershot Municipal Borough
- Farnborough Urban District

The new district was named Rushmoor, taking its name from an old area of heath on the west side of the borough, known for Rushmoor Arena, a military showground constructed in 1923. The new district was granted borough status from its creation, allowing the chair of the council to take the title of mayor.

In May 2000, a referendum was held on whether to change the name of the borough. Two alternative names were suggested in place of Rushmoor: Aldershot and Farnborough or Farnborough and Aldershot. In the event, more than 81% of those who voted chose to retain the name, on a turnout of 29%.

The population of the area that would become Rushmoor was 1,366 in 1801, growing to 39,616 in 1901. It was over 100,000 at 2021 census.

== Governance ==
Rushmoor Borough Council

Type
- Type: Non-metropolitan district

Leadership
- Mayor: Peter Cullum, Conservative since 26 May 2026
- Leader: Gareth Williams, Labour since 21 May 2024
- Managing Director (interim): Ian Harrison since April 2025

Structure
- Seats: 39 councillors
- Political groups: Administration (18) Labour (18) Other parties (21) Conservative (10) Reform (6) Liberal Democrats (3) Independent (2)
- Length of term: 4 years

Elections
- Last election: 7 May 2026
- Next election: 6 May 2027

Meeting place
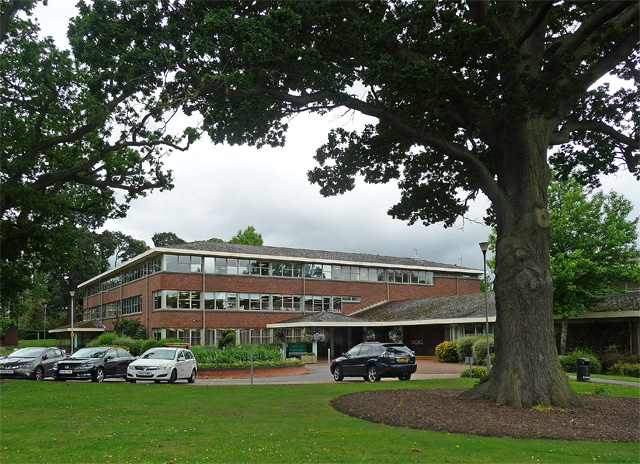
- Council Offices, Farnborough Road, Farnborough, GU14 7JU

Website
- www.rushmoor.gov.uk

Rushmoor Borough Council provides district-level services. County-level services are provided by Hampshire County Council. There are no civil parishes in the borough, which is an unparished area.

Under upcoming local government reform plans the district will be combined with the Basingstoke and Deane and Hart districts to form a North Hampshire unitary authority from 2028.

=== Political control ===
Following a series of defections from the Labour Party, the council has been in a state of no overall control since September 2025, with Labour leading a minority administration. Prior to this the council had been under Labour majority control since the 2024 election; the first time the party had won a majority on the council in its history.

The first election to the council was held in 1973, initially acting as a shadow authority alongside the outgoing authorities until the new arrangements took effect on 1 April 1974.

Party in control	Years
No overall control	1974–1976
Conservative	1976–1980
No overall control	1980–1982
Conservative	1982–1995
No overall control	1995–2000
Conservative	2000–2024
Labour	2024–2025
No overall control	2025–present

=== Leadership ===
The role of mayor is largely ceremonial in Rushmoor. Political leadership is instead provided by the leader of the council. The leaders since 2001 have been:

Councillor	Party	From	To
John Marsh	Conservative	2001	May 2005
Peter Moyle	Conservative	24 May 2005	May 2016
David Clifford	Conservative	24 May 2016	7 Dec 2023
Gareth Lyon	Conservative	7 Dec 2023	May 2024
Gareth Williams	Labour	21 May 2024	

=== Composition ===
Following the 2026 election and subsequent changes to July 2026,, the composition of the council was:

Party	Seats
Labour	18
Conservative	10
Reform	6
Liberal Democrats	3
Independent	2
Total	39

=== Elections ===
Since the last boundary changes in 2012 the council has comprised 39 councillors representing 13 wards, with each ward electing three councillors. Elections are held three years out of every four, with a third of the council (one councillor for each ward) elected each time for a four-year term of office. Hampshire County Council elections are held in the fourth year of the cycle when there are no borough council elections.

=== Premises ===
On its creation in 1974 the council's offices were divided between the buildings inherited from its predecessor authorities, being Aldershot Town Hall and Farnborough Town Hall. Shortly afterwards the council decided to replace both buildings with a single headquarters. A site known as Elles Mess in Farnborough was bought from the British Army and a new building called Council Offices built there, which was completed in 1981.

== Economy ==
=== Aviation ===
The Borough of Rushmoor stated that Farnborough Airfield, including the RAE, historically was a major employment area in Rushmoor. In the 1960s, over 10,000 employees worked at the airport. In May 1996, 5,800 jobs, 13% of the total jobs in Rushmoor, were at the airport. In June 2009, TAG submitted an application to increase the total number of flight movements from 28000 a year to a maximum of 50,000 a year and to increase the number of flight movements at weekends and on Bank Holidays from 5,000 a year to 8,900 a year. This went to appeal and the secretary of state allowed it to go ahead in February 2011, overruling the Borough Council' refusal.

The Air Accidents Investigation Branch (AAIB), the British aviation accident investigation agency, is based within the airport.

== Demographics ==
According to the UK census in 2021, Rushmoor has the highest number of Buddhists in England and Wales, at 4.7% of the population. The area contains the Aldershot Buddhist Centre, a Nepali Vajrayana temple founded by immigrant communities.

== Twin towns – sister cities ==
Rushmoor is twinned with:

- Dayton, Ohio, United States (since 2019)
- Gorkha Municipality, Nepal (since 2020)
- Meudon, France (since 1974)
- Oberursel, Germany (since 1989)
- Rzeszów, Poland (since 2019)
- Sulechów, Poland (since 2001)

== See also ==
- Howard N. Cole, Borough Remembrancer for Aldershot, 1963–1974
