= Municipal Gardens, Aldershot =

Urban park in Hampshire, England

Coordinates: 51°14′51″N 0°46′08″W

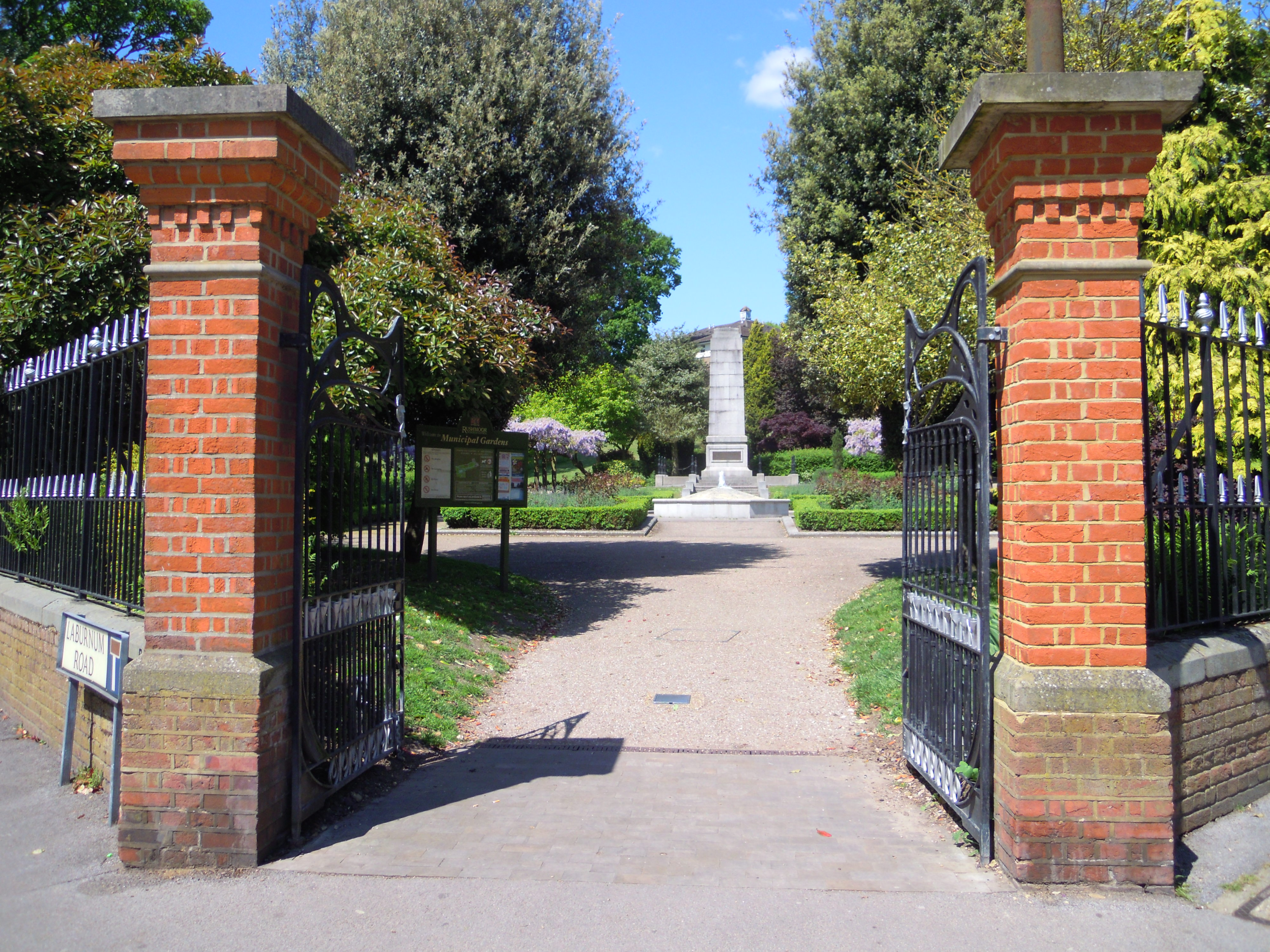
Entrance to Municipal Gardens with the Cenotaph beyond

Municipal Gardens is an urban park in the town of Aldershot in Hampshire. A short walk from the town centre, it has been a public park since 1904. In its ornamental garden is the Aldershot Cenotaph which commemorates the town's dead from both World Wars. In 2019, the Cenotaph received Grade II listed status on the Register of Historic England.

== The Gardens ==
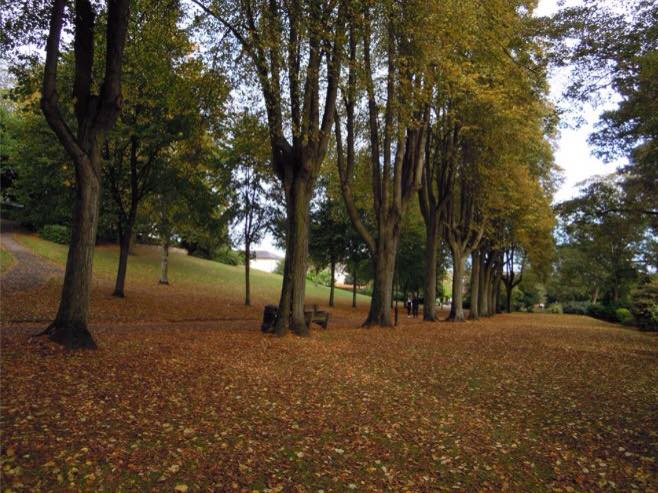
The Avenue of Trees in 2016

Laying out the People's Park (renamed the Municipal Gardens) in 1904

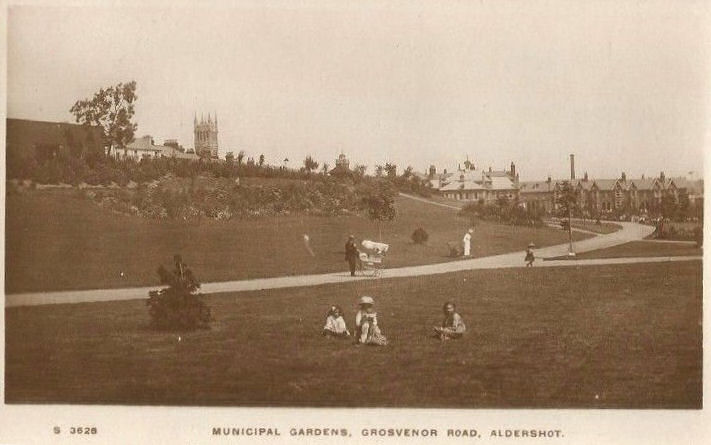
Municipal Gardens in 1905

The Municipal Gardens are located on tracts of land purchased between 1894 and 1895 by Aldershot Urban District Council from the Church's wardens and overseers for public use. After much discussion about price a settlement was agreed and work on the nearby Municipal Buildings and Gardens commenced. This ancient piece of land, referred to as the 'Parish Clerk's Land' in the Crondall Hundred, was laid out as the Municipal Gardens and opened to the public in 1904. On 'Arbour Day' on 13 December 1905, 32 trees including lime, chestnut, acacia, and sycamore were planted by their donors who were prominent local people.

With its main entrance through restored Edwardian gates on Grosvenor Road, the Municipal Gardens are situated within the Aldershot West Conservation Area at the edge of the town centre. Entrances to the gardens are also located in Arlington Terrace and Laburnum Road. The park is set out in a typical late Victorian style, with pathways including an avenue shaded by mature trees and an ornamental garden with a modern water fountain and a wisteria pergola.

From the 1980s until completion in 2004, the park underwent a number of improvements including adapting the former tennis courts into a hard court, restoring the historic path network and railings and installing a new fountain. The improvements have involved the work of various artists and craftspeople in the fields of stone lettering, mosaics and metal sculpture. Bisected from the main area of the gardens by a pathway can be found a children's playground.

== The Cenotaph ==
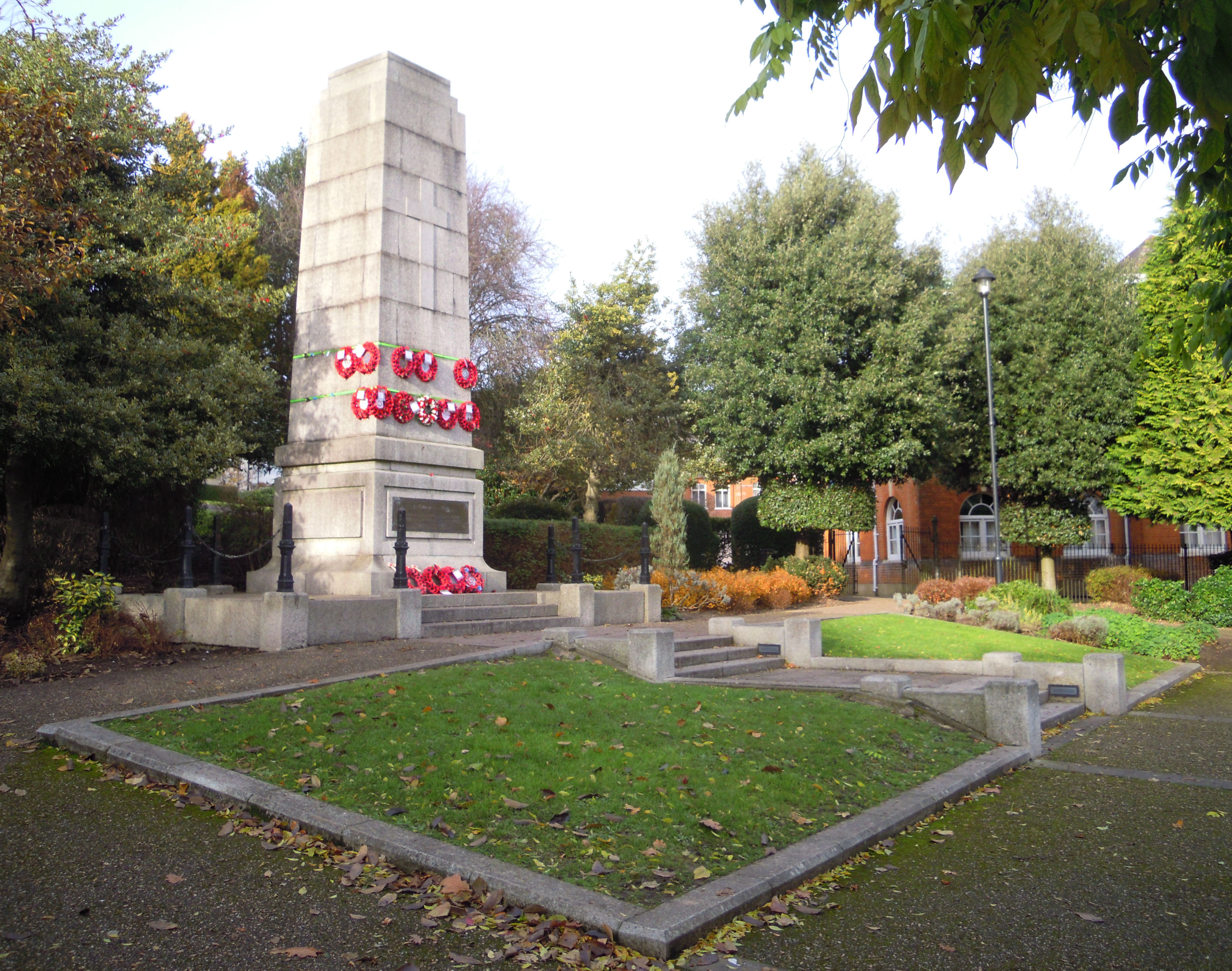
The Cenotaph in November 2016 after a Remembrance Day Service

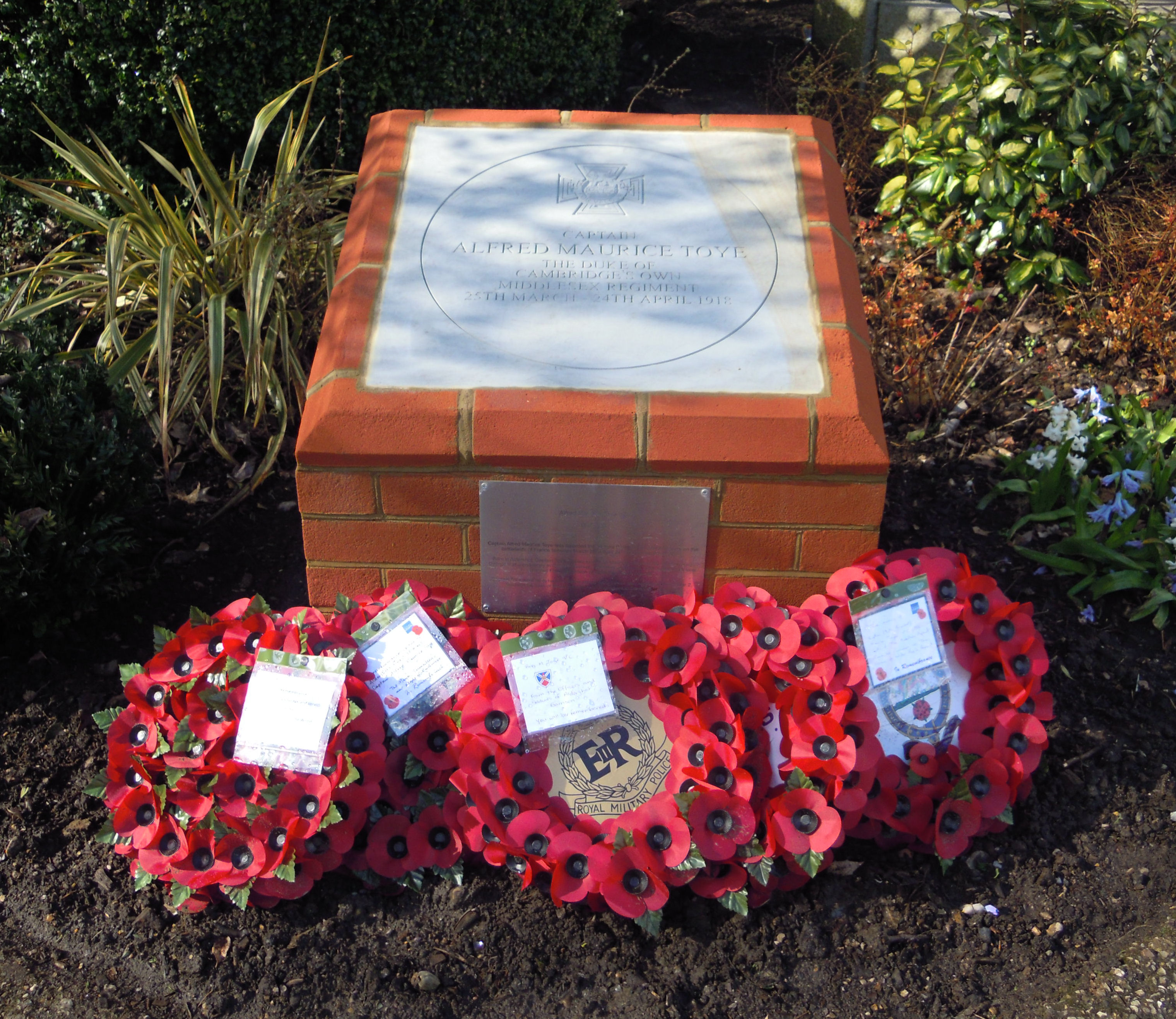
The memorial plaque to Alfred Toye VC in the Municipal Gardens in 2018

In the ornamental garden at the eastern end of the park is the Cenotaph which was dedicated by Theodore Woods, Bishop of Winchester, and unveiled by Prince Henry, Duke of Gloucester on 18 March 1925 in memory of those who gave their lives in World War I. The memorial was formally presented to the Mayor of Aldershot by Mr F B Bateman of the Aldershot War Memorial Committee. The guard of honour at the unveiling was formed by detachments from every branch of the Service then at Aldershot Command. Unusually, the memorial has no list of names of the fallen but just the simple inscription: “This memorial was erected in grateful memory to those who gave their lives for their country in the Great War 1914 - 1919”. The reason for this absence is explained in the programme for the unveiling ceremony, which states: “It is impossible to estimate the total and exact number of Aldershot men who joined the Colours. The military nature of our town must of necessity have rendered it a unique percentage.”

The Cenotaph, which is made of Cornish granite with a large base with three steps and plinth, was built at a cost of £1,155 and was originally flanked by two artillery pieces, one German and one Turkish dating from World War I. These were removed in 1940.

Sometime after World War II a further two flights of steps were added leading towards the Cenotaph, and which form a processional route. An additional inscription was added in 1950 in remembrance of those who died during World War II. The modern fountain in front of the memorial was installed as part of improvements to the Municipal Gardens in 2000.

As Aldershot is a garrison town with a large population of serving soldiers and veterans the Cenotaph plays a key role in various acts of remembrance throughout the year such as a commemoration of the Battle of the Somme in 2016 and the annual Remembrance Day. To commemorate the centenary of the ending of World War I a vigil was held at the Cenotaph throughout the night of 10 November 2018 before a remembrance service on 11 November 2018.

On 25 March 2018, on the 100th anniversary of the action in which he won his Victoria Cross during World War I, a memorial to Alfred Toye VC was unveiled beside the Cenotaph in the Municipal Gardens.

In 2019, the Cenotaph received Grade II listed status on the Register of Historic England. In its appraisal Historic England recognised the structure's architectural interest as an 'elegantly proportioned cenotaph'.

== See also ==
- Aldershot Park
- Brickfields Country Park
- Manor Park, Aldershot
- Princes Gardens, Aldershot
- Rowhill Nature Reserve
