= David Montague Davis =

David Montague Davis (c.1853 – 30 November 1932), was a British choirmaster and music teacher.

David Montague Davis was born in London in c. 1853, and privately educated there.

Davis started as choirmaster of the East London Synagogue in 1877, and the following year he was appointed musical director, choirmaster and organist of the New West End Synagogue, a year before it opened its doors in 1879, and remained its choirmaster for 51 years.

He edited The Voice Of Prayer And Praise (1899), together with Rabbi Francis Lyon Cohen, known as the Blue Book, as that was the colour of its original cover.

Davis founded the Hebrew Choral Association, and in 1900, was appointed director of the Gunnersbury School of Music, and in 1906 he became conductor of the Chiswick and Gunnersbury Philharmonic Society.
