= Aldershot Cemetery =

Cemetery in Aldershot, Hampshire, England

Coordinates: 51°14′58″N 0°44′52″W

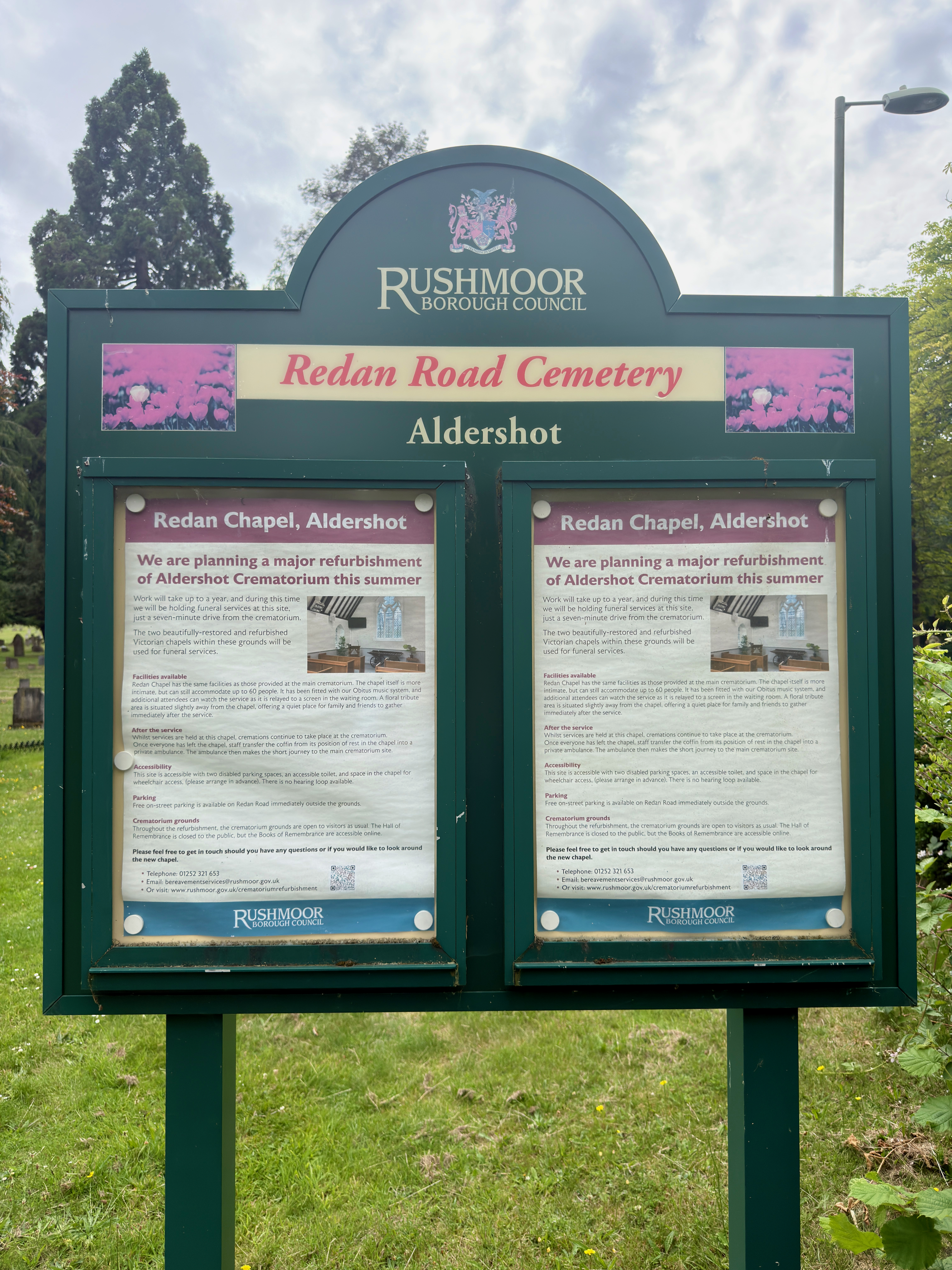
Sign post at Aldershot Cemetery

Aldershot Cemetery (officially the Redan Road Cemetery, also known as Aldershot Civic Cemetery) is the main public burial ground for the town of Aldershot in Hampshire.

Although most military burials take place in the nearby Aldershot Military Cemetery, there are 57 men from all three services buried in Aldershot Cemetery who died on active service during World War I and World War II.

Today the cemetery is maintained by Rushmoor Borough Council.

== History ==
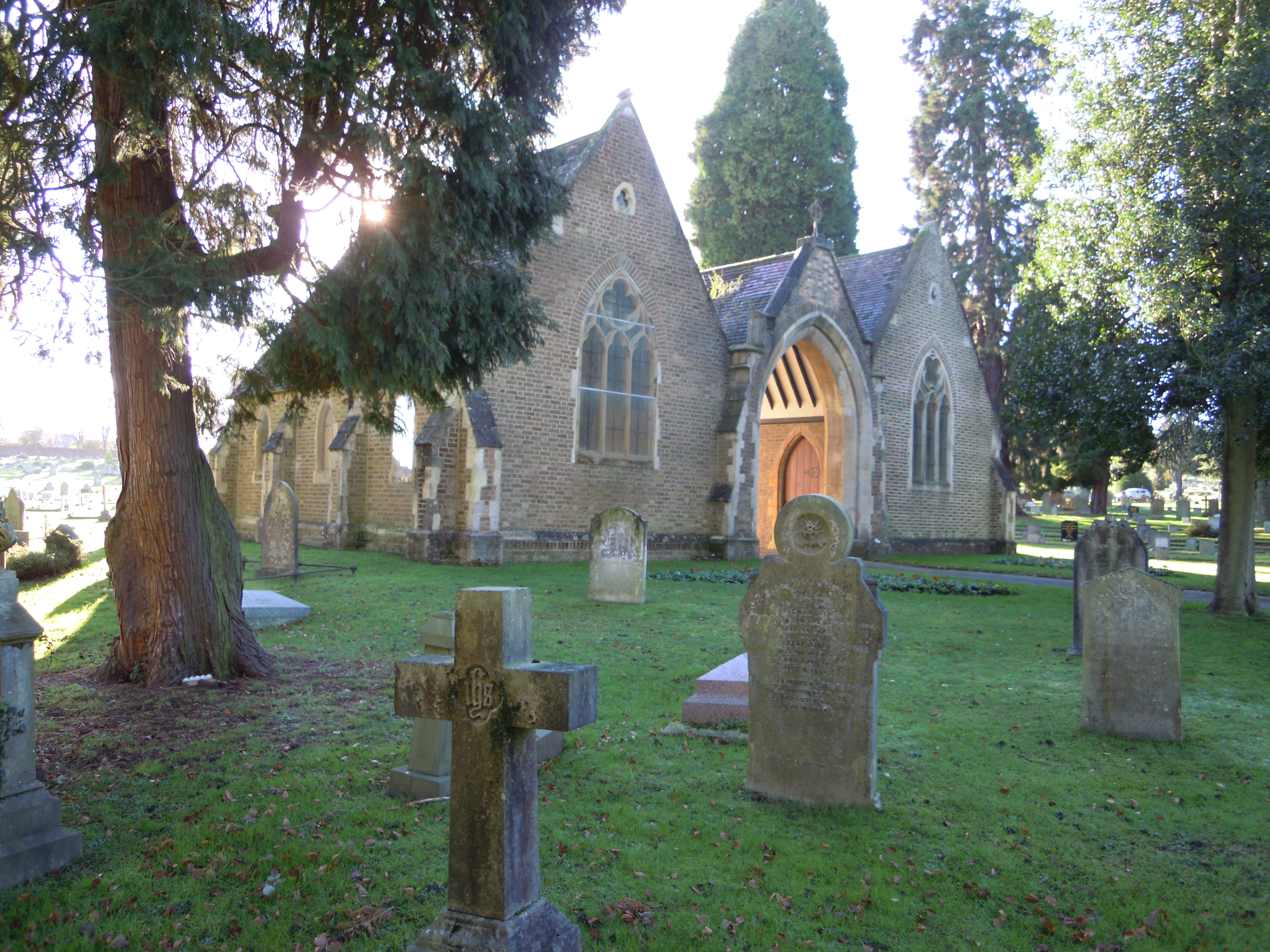
The chapels at Aldershot Cemetery

As the civilian town of Aldershot expanded with the arrival of the Army in the 1850s the need for a new town cemetery soon became apparent. Until then the old village churchyard surrounding the parish church of St Michael's had been adequate. The Aldershot Burial Board was formed at a Vestry Meeting on 31 October 1860, and its nine members held its first meeting the following month. They moved quickly to obtain a site for a town cemetery, and before the end of the year the Board had acquired land formerly known as "Bedford’s Field" at the foot of Redan Hill at a cost of £1,700. Two chapels were built either side of the roadway into the cemetery, one for the Church of England and the other for Nonconformists. The two chapels were linked by a roof over the road which formed a covered shelter.

In 1871 the Burial Board approached the War Office to request the purchase of the strip of land on the opposite side of Redan Road up to the railway line. This was agreed, and ownership of the land transferred to the Burial Board on 26 July 1871. More land was added in 1886, and more again in 1894 at an additional cost of £1,050, reflecting the ever-increasing demand from the expanding town. By the middle of the 20th century, the cemetery covered an area of around thirty acres (12 ha).

== Jewish Cemetery ==
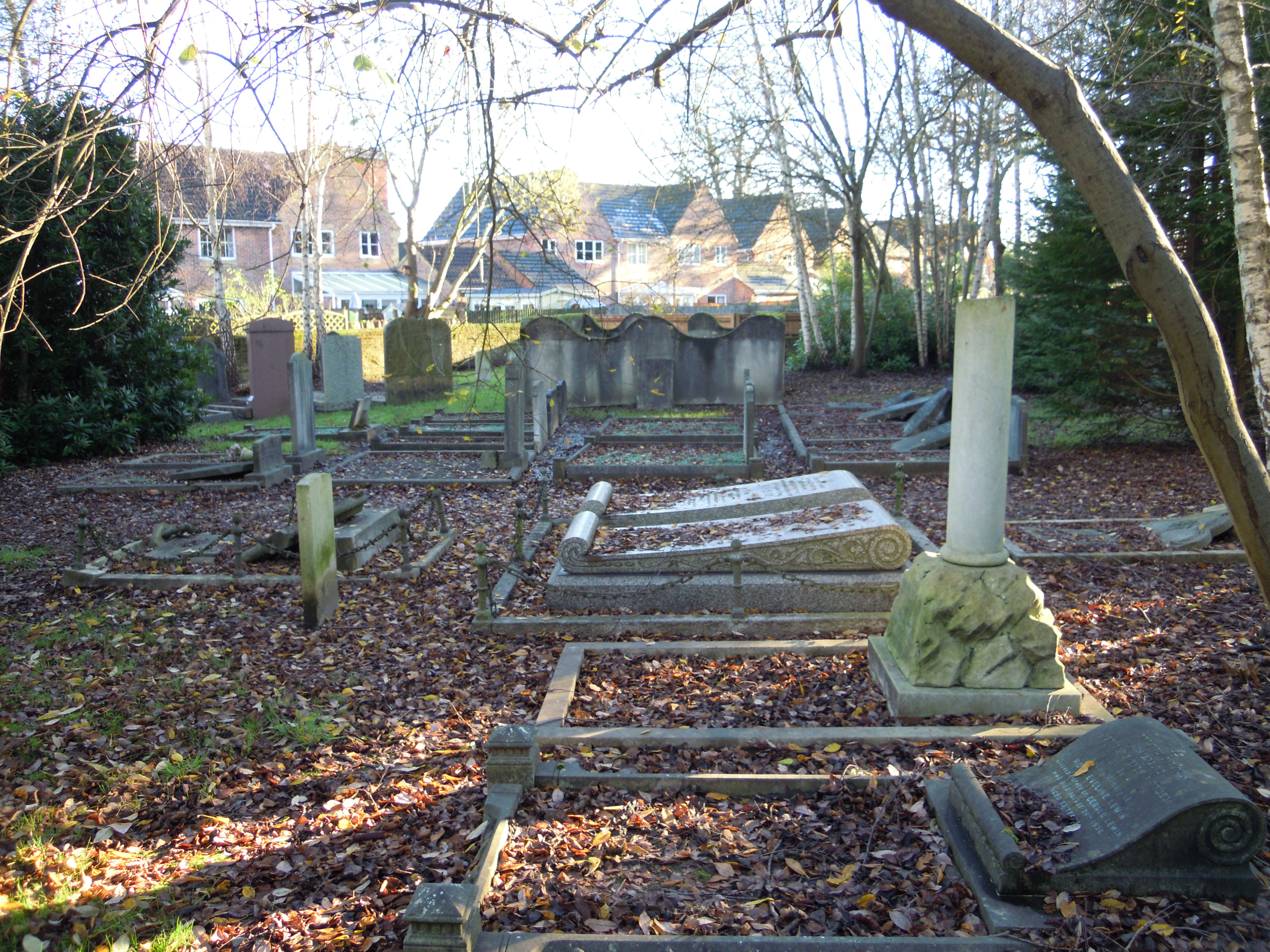
Graves in the United Synagogue Cemetery

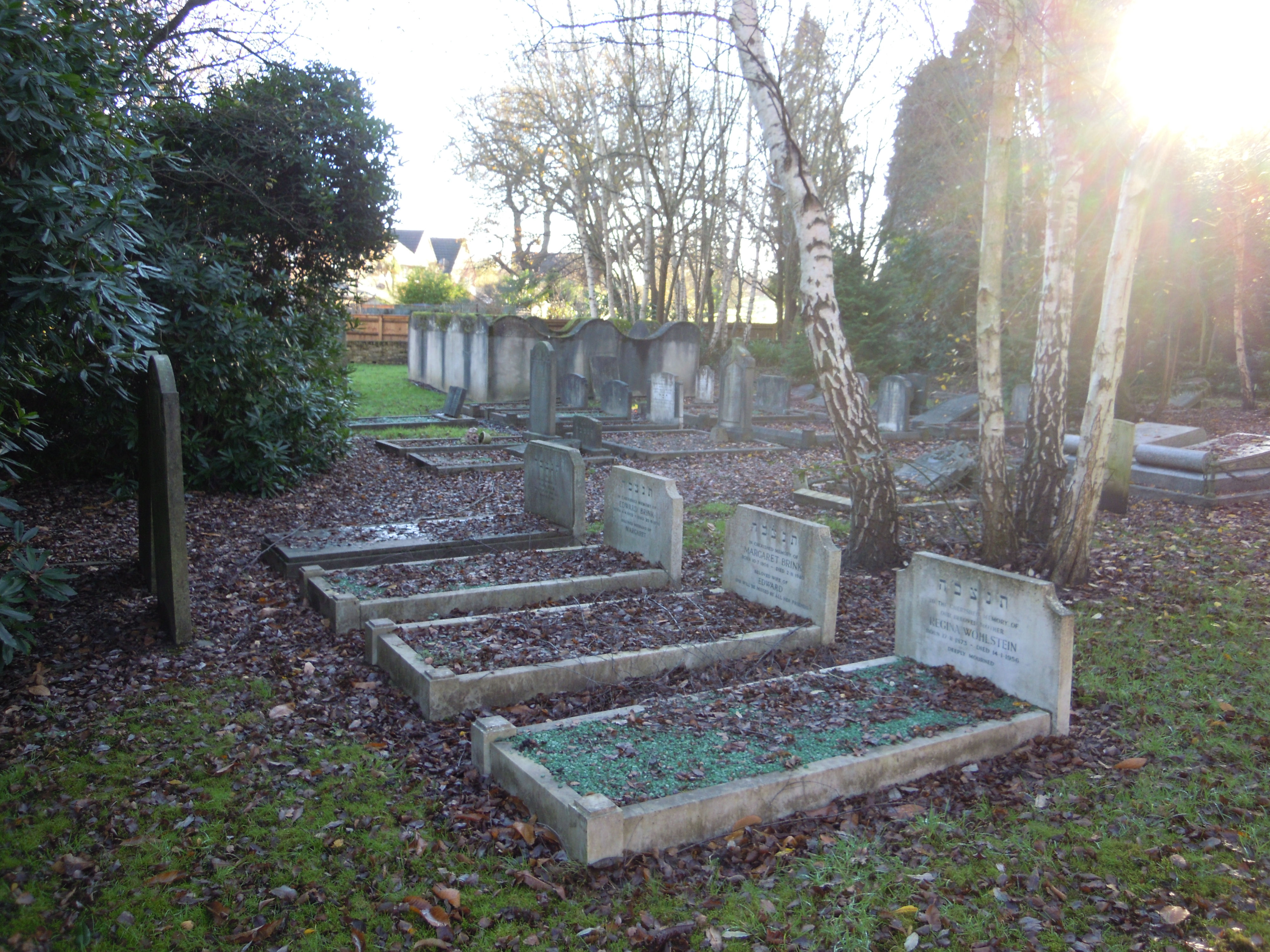
Graves in the United Synagogue Cemetery

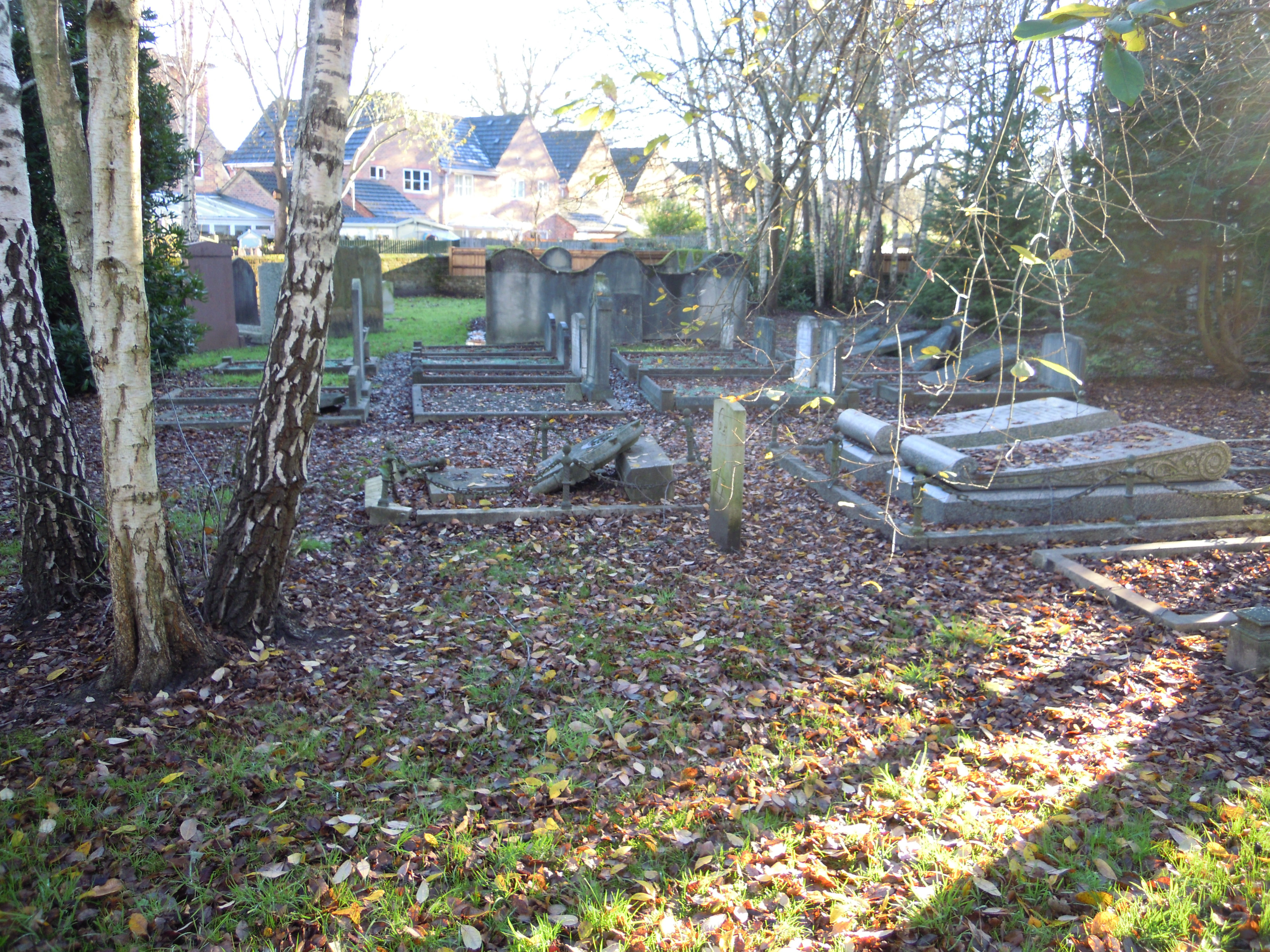
Graves in the United Synagogue Cemetery

Attached at the bottom of the hill is a small separate Jewish cemetery of the United Synagogue. As the Jewish community in Aldershot grew in the 1860s so the need for a Jewish burial ground arose and in July 1864 an application was made to the Aldershot Burial Board for a section of the Board's burial ground to be made available for the use of the Congregation. This had apparently long since been in mind because a plan of grave spaces of the Aldershot Cemetery dated 1861 shows a portion of the Cemetery "allotted to the Hebrew Congregation". This had been agreed by Lord Grey on 20 April 1864, but formal steps could not be taken to ratify it until the Congregation had been properly constituted.

Malcolm Slowe wrote in his essay 'The Foundation of Aldershot Synagogue':

"The application explained that the part set aside for the Congregation would have to be distinctly divided by a wall from the remainder of the burial ground, have a separate entrance from the road, and be entirely under the control of the Congregation. The application put forward a new approach and asserted that as rate payers and residents in the parish the members of the Congregation had a right to a space for this purpose. Apparently this application was a mere formality because on the 30th July 1864, the Board met and instructed the Clerk that it was disposed to entertain the application to the extent of 1,200 sq. yds. instead of the 2,000 sq. yds. asked for if the Congregation were prepared to pay £50 and carry out the work of erecting the division wall and the separate entrance at their own expense, The Congregation must have been optimistic in regard to the growth, because although the cemetery is still in use there is still room for grave spaces. A formal Agreement took rather longer and was dated the 19th April 1865, and a grant was accordingly made to Moses Phillips, Selim Melson, Joseph Lazareck, Woolf Cohen, and Francis Phillips as trustees for the Congregation. This formality must also been anticipated because on May 1st Mr. Joseph Stoodley, a builder of Aldershot, offered to execute the works required for £59, and a formal Agreement was entered into with Mr. Stoodley on the 10th May 1865."

In 1914 the funeral was held in the Jewish cemetery of Mrs Priscilla Minnie Solomon, the wife of Alderman Nathaniel Solomon, Chairman of Aldershot Urban District Council in 1907 and Mayor of the Borough of Aldershot in 1924. In a tribute to her the Rev. Michael Adler said:

"The Jewish Soldiers have lost one of their best friends in the passing away of Mrs. N. Solomon, who for many years acted as Hon. Secretary to the Aldershot Congregation. Her interest in the welfare, moral and material, of the Jewish regular who was stationed at the barracks near her home, was unceasing. During the negotiations with the Headquarters' Staff that resulted in the present synagogue being given by the authorities to the Aldershot military and civil community. Mrs. Solomon was indefatigable, and supported me with the utmost loyalty in bringing the work to a successful issue."

The Aldershot Gazette said in its long account of the funeral:

"Crowds of people had assembled at the graveyard and followed with the deepest interest and sympathy the somewhat brief service of committal, rendered in Hebrew and English. The emotion of the bereaved husband and some (sic.) was touching to behold. Each mourner at the conclusion of the service took the sexton's spade and shovelled three spadesful of earth into the grave. The officiating clergy were the Rev. Michael Adler, assisted by the Rev. Plascow."

The Jewish Cemetery has three graves to soldiers with Commonwealth War Graves Commission headstones – two from World War I and one from World War II, while in the centre of the cemetery is a large tomb of unusual design to the Cohen Family of Aldershot, a member of which was the Rev Francis Lyon Cohen (1862–1934), the first Jewish chaplain to the British Army.

== Notable burials ==
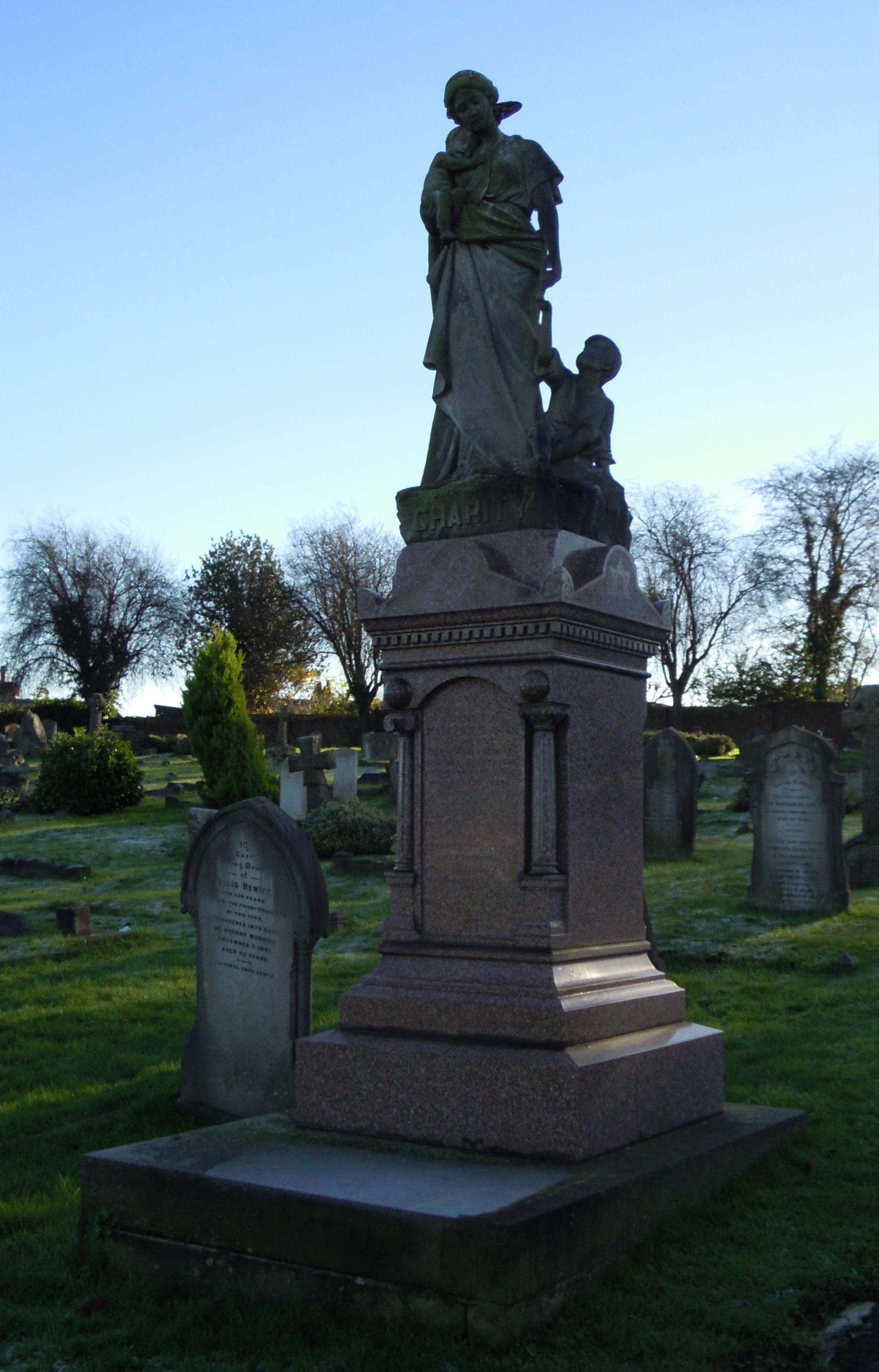
The monument to solicitor and prominent Freemason Richard Eve

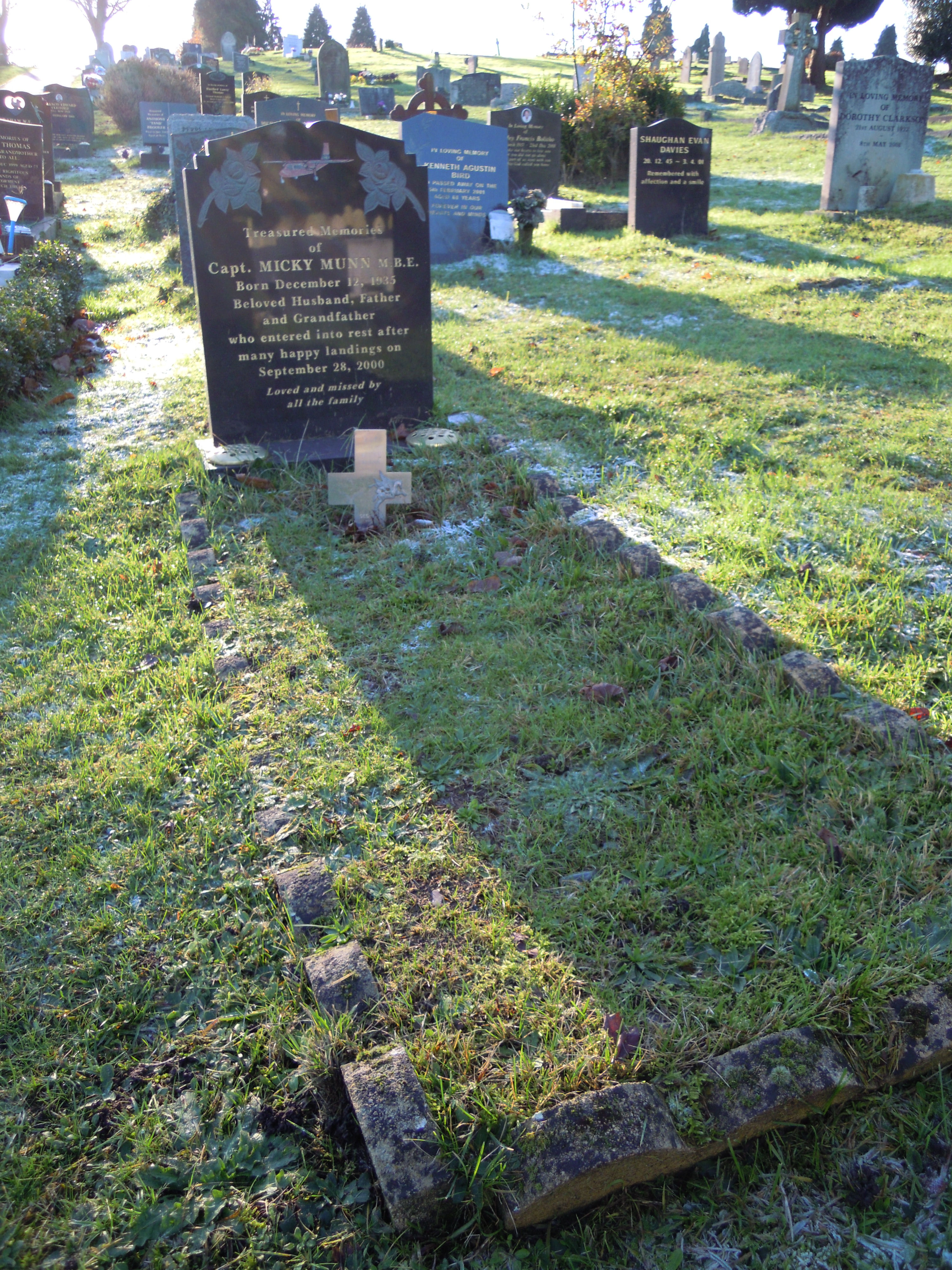
Grave of Captain Micky Munn MBE of the Parachute Regiment

- Richard Eve (1831–1900), Grand Treasurer of the United Grand Lodge of England in 1889
- Ada Field (1893–1922), murdered in Manor Park in Aldershot in 1922 by her jilted fiancé who then shot himself.
- Jill Mansfield (1938–1972), killed in the Aldershot bombing by the Official IRA in 1972.
- Johnny Berry (1926–1994), professional footballer with Manchester United and Birmingham City

== See also ==
- Aldershot Military Cemetery
- Aldershot Crematorium
