= Masters W60 3000 metres world record progression =

This is the progression of world record improvements of the 3000 metres W60 division of Masters athletics. Records must be set in properly conducted, official competitions under the standing IAAF rules unless modified by World Masters Athletics. The W60 division consists of female athletes who have reached the age of 60 but have not yet reached the age of 65, so exactly from their 60th birthday to the day before their 65th birthday.

Key

Incomplete information Pending

Hand	Auto	Athlete	Nationality	Birthdate	Location	Date
	10:28.94	Silke Schmidt	Germany	7 August 1959	Rotterdam	22 August 2019
	10:43.68	Silke Schmidt	Germany	7 August 1959	Utrecht	9 August 2019
	10:54.04	Lidia Zentner	Germany	27 March 1953	Pfungstadt	4 September 2013
11:06.6		Angela Copson	United Kingdom	20 April 1947	Solihull	16 August 2009
	11:20.22	Janette Stevenson	United Kingdom	3 May 1949	Dunfermline	14 June 2009
11:28.0		Angela Copson	United Kingdom	20 April 1947	Birmingham	14 September 2008
11:29.1		Angela Copson	United Kingdom	20 April 1947	Hemel Hempstead	10 August 2008
11:36.3		Rona Fredericks	Germany	7 January 1940	Berlin	2 July 2000
	11:41.91	Gerda van Kooten	Netherlands	1 April 1939	Gorinchem	20 June 1999
	12:01.65	Denise Alfvoet	Belgium	13 October 1935	Zwevegem	16 May 1996
