= Richard Eve =

English solicitor and notary (1831–1900)

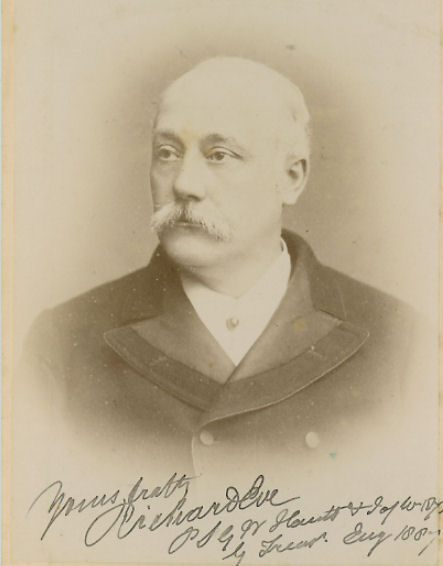
Richard Eve in 1887

Richard Eve FRGS (6 December 1831 – 7 July 1900) was an English solicitor and notary in Aldershot in Hampshire in the 19th century and a prominent Freemason who was the Grand Treasurer of the United Grand Lodge of England in 1889, and the Chairman of the Royal Masonic School for Boys. He defended Ahmed 'Urabi (Arabi Pascha) in Cairo when he was tried by the restored Khedivate on 3 December 1882 following the 'Urabi Revolt which had led to the Anglo-Egyptian War.

== Biography ==
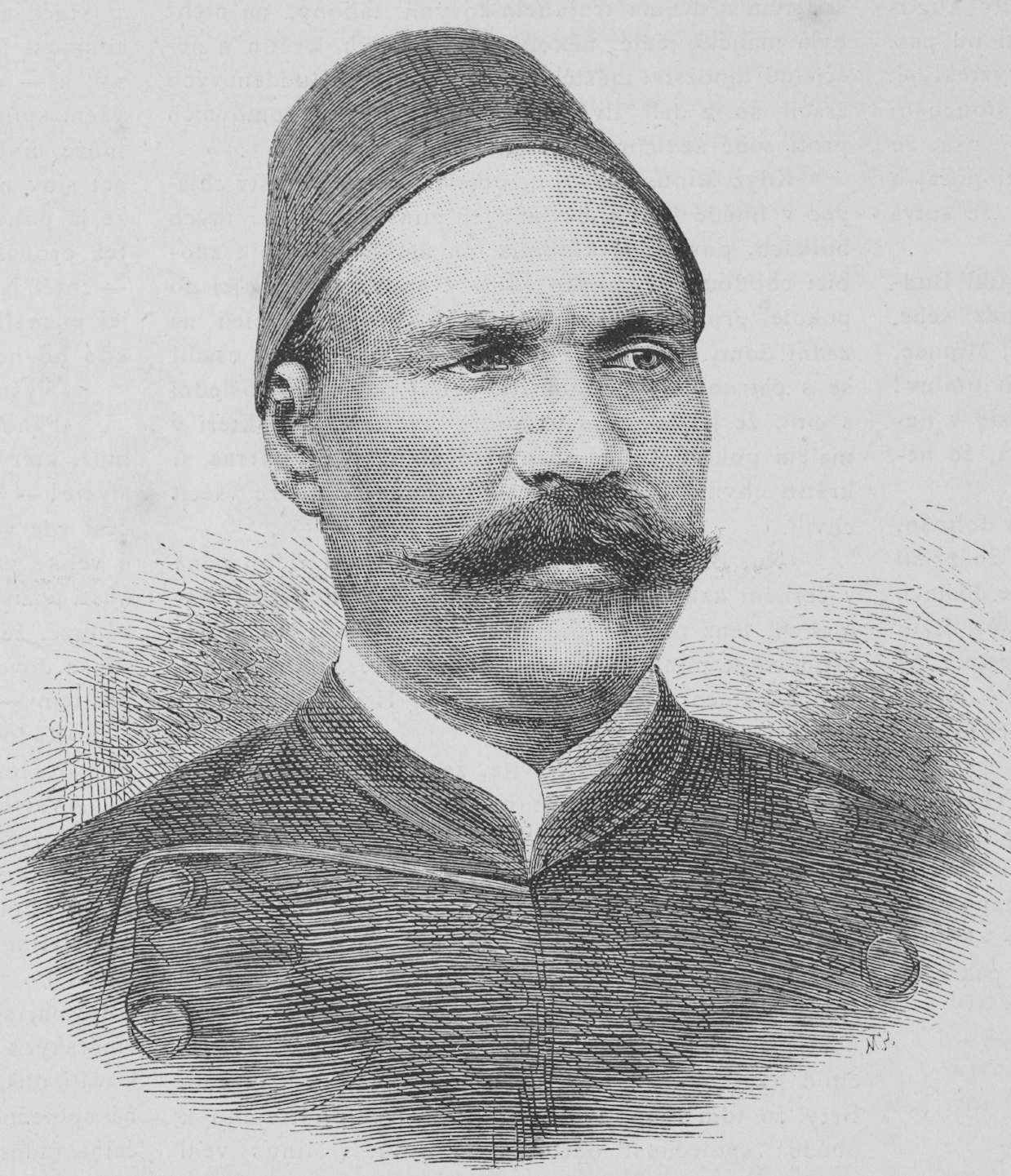
Eve defended Ahmed 'Urabi in 1882

Eve was born in Bromsgrove Street in Kidderminster, the youngest son of Ann and John Eve, the foreman in a local carpet factory. After leaving school Eve was articled to a solicitors' office in Leamington Spa in 1846; here he was initiated into Guy's Lodge No. 556 (now No. 395) in 1854, becoming Master of the lodge in 1861. He joined Brecknock Lodge No. 936 (now No. 651) in Brecon in Wales in 1861 during a short period there. He set up his own small solicitor's office in Aldershot at the time the British Army was rapidly expanding its presence in the area. Here he joined Panmure Lodge No 723. Over the next 15 years his Aldershot legal practice expanded greatly and he became a prominent local citizen, entering politics and serving on various local authorities and becoming Lord of the Manor of Farnborough in Hampshire and a County Councillor for Hampshire.

He defended Ahmed 'Urabi (Arabi Pascha) in Cairo when he was tried by the restored Khedivate on 3 December 1882 following the 'Urabi Revolt which had led to the Anglo-Egyptian War. Eve stood unsuccessfully as a Liberal candidate for Parliament five times, twice contesting the Kidderminster Constituency in 1892 and 1895. At the same time he further developed his interest in Freemasonry, joining the Grand Master's Lodge No. 1 in London in 1884. Eve was appointed as Treasurer of Supreme Grand Chapter in 1887 and Grand Treasurer of the United Grand Lodge of England in 1889.

== Later years ==
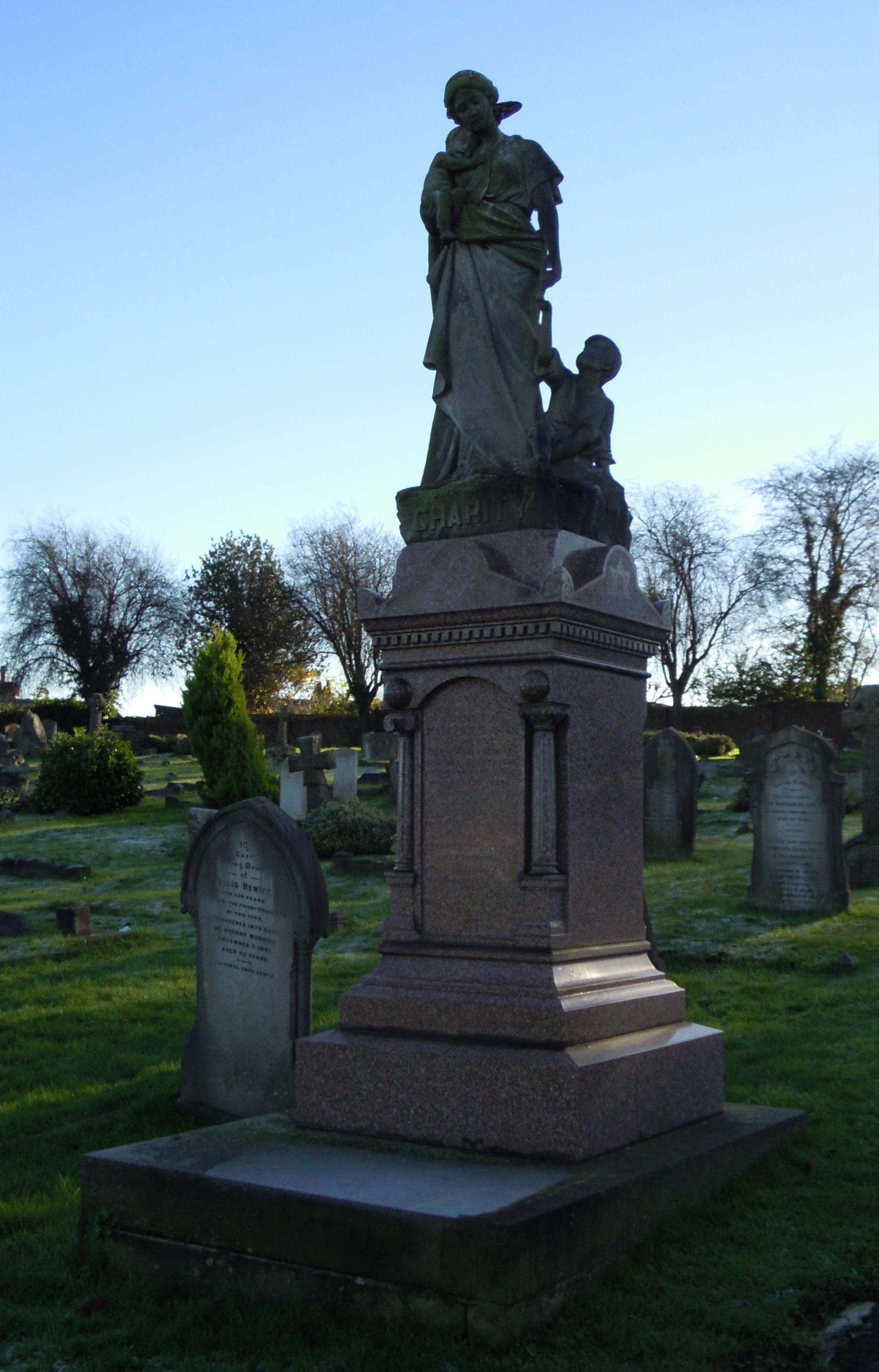
Eve's grave in Aldershot Cemetery

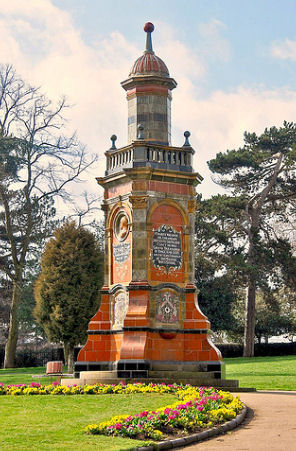
Eve's monument in Brinton Park in Kidderminster

Eve was Chairman of the Royal Masonic School for Boys management board from 1891 until his death in 1900. In 1899 a Lodge was formed which was linked to the Boys' School; it was named Richard Eve Lodge (No. 2772) in his honour. A history of the Lodge states that it "had its origin in the wish of many admirers of Richard Eve to perpetuate his name as a worthy citizen of London and as a sterling worker in the Masonic cause."

Richard Eve was taken ill in London where he had gone for the laying of a foundation stone for the Boys' School, and died at 11 Nottingham Place in Marylebone of a seizure a few days later on 7 July 1900. He was buried in Aldershot Cemetery where a large granite memorial of the figure of Charity and a child adorns his grave. He never married, and his estate of £34,199 6s 8d was left to fellow solicitors and the Cottage Hospital in Aldershot.

The Masonic funeral was reported in The Freemason on 21 July 1900.

"Bro Eve had found in life manifold points of sympathetic contact with his fellows and on this day his friends rose up from all parts of England to pay a last tribute of respect to his memory... It was a solemn and inspiring sight – this long procession of black-coated men. The great body of Masons marched in twos in front of the carriage. There were about 100 of them, all wearing the customary white gloves and carrying their sprigs of acacia."

A 29 foot tall monumental drinking fountain to Eve's memory was unveiled in Brinton Park in Kidderminster in 1902. This was raised by "Admiring friends to keep his memory green in his native town which he ardently loved." The monument is faced with glazed Doulton tiles in green, terracotta and bronze and a portrait of Eve in profile.
