= The Voice of Prayer and Praise =

Jewish liturgical music

Kol Rinnah U’Tefillah (Hebrew: קול רנה ותפילה, lit. 'The Voice of Prayer and Praise') is a collection of Jewish liturgical music published in the United Kingdom in 1899. It is considered the primary reference work for the synagogue music of British Ashkenazi Jewry.

== History ==
In 1899, the Choir Committee of the Council of the United Synagogue commissioned Francis Lyon Cohen and David Montague Davis to compile a standardized the body of liturgical music. This was an update of Cohen and B. L. Mosely's 1889 Shirei K’nesset Yisrael – Songs of the Congregation of Israel. Early references to the volume as a 'hymnal' highlight parallels with other Victorian religious choral works.

Since it was originally published with a blue cover, the book has commonly been nicknamed 'The Blue Book'. The Blue Book contains songs and chants for the entire Jewish calendar written in reduced-score 4-part harmony so it could be played on the piano or organ to accompany the choir in rehearsal or at a wedding ceremony, and the melody and alto lines in tonic sol fa for those who are unable to read sheet music notation. In 1933, Samuel Alman republished the Blue Book adding supplement with several of his own compositions.

Most of the compositions are listed as 'traditional', the work of Julius Mombach, or arrangements by Cohen and Davis themselves. While some traditional pieces are attributed to Sephardic origin, the primary reference book for Western Sephardim is The Ancient Melodies of the Liturgy of the Spanish and Portuguese Jews by de Sola and Aguilar.

Some of the compositions that appear in The Voice of Prayer and Praise are adaptions of secular works. Two examples are Va’anachnu, arranged to Felix Mendelssohn's oratorio Elijah ("Open the Heavens"), and Hodo Al Eretz, based on Mendelssohn's Hear My Prayer / O for the Wings of a Dove (Psalm 55). Davis chose to arrange Va’anachnu in the same key, but transcribed it with doubled note lengths.
