= Julius Mombach =

Julius (Israel Lazarus) Mombach (1813 – February 1880) was a 19th-century English synagogue composer. Tunkel (2012) regards him as "the most important of the composers of synagogue music in the Anglo-Jewish tradition of the 19th Century" whilst Elton (2003) doesn't even restrict this assessment to England.

His compositions started from the traditional modes of synagogue music, but extended to include German and English folk song and contemporary classical themes. His style was influenced by Mendelssohn, and motifs from Elijah appear in a number of his pieces.

== Life ==
Mombach was born in Pfungstadt, Germany in 1813, the son of a cantor. Pfungstadt is a small town to the south of Darmstadt in central Germany. The family name comes from the town of Mombach near Mainz.

In 1827 or 1828, Enoch Binom Elias (Enoch Eliasson) from Darmstadt was appointed cantor at the Great Synagogue, Duke's Place, London. A condition of his appointment as cantor was that he should bring a boy accompanist (or meshorrer) with him. The cantor traditionally sang in a trio with a meshorrer and a bass. In 1827, Mombach would have been 14, and it is unknown whether his voice had broken; in practice this was not a major issue, as the meshorrer could be either a treble or a tenor.

Within two years, Elias had caught a chill which damaged his voice. In 1829, he left his position and took up an appointment as Director of Concerts at the Lyceum Theatre. Mombach remained at the Synagogue and took musical instruction from Elias. The post of cantor remained vacant until 1832, when Simon Ascher of Gröningen was appointed. He had "a fine, clear tenor, whose florid style of recitative with frequent roulades long remained a beloved memory with London Jews".

After Salomon Sulzer pioneered the use of a full choir in the synagogue in Vienna in 1825, Jewish communities all over Europe followed his example. However, at the Great Synagogue in London, Chief Rabbi Solomon Hirschell expressly forbade the use of sheet music (which he referred to as the "Book of Strokes") and the tuning fork. Hirschell would not permit the repetition by the new choir of the word Hallelujah unless the last syllable, embodying the Divine name, were omitted until the close.

Following the Rabbi's death in 1840, the resulting change in leadership spurred on by Henry Hyman Cohen allowed a full choir to be formed the following year. Mombach was appointed choirmaster, a post he held for the next forty years until his death. He led the choir as a tenor, joined by Samuel Lewis —the last bass from the traditional trio, and a stalwart of the choir for another 50 years— and youngsters recruited by Ascher and trained to sing the treble and alto parts. With a new choir, Mombach was able, or needed, to compose music for it. During the 1860s, he started dividing his time between the Great Synagogue and the New Synagogue in Great St Helens. On Sabbath mornings, he started at the New, then he would make his appearance in Duke's Place during the reading of the Haphtarah, and the congregation would rise in his honour as he entered.

He died, it would seem quite suddenly, in 1880. His wife predeceased him by some 17 years, and they had had no children.

== Works ==
Mombach's principal work was as the choirmaster and composer at the Great Synagogue. He never published any of his work; that task was left to the Reader of the Great Synagogue, the Rev. Moses Keizer. In 1881, the latter published Ne'im Zemirot Yisrael (The Sacred Musical Compositions of I. L. Mombach). The work was short lived and only ran to one edition, because in 1899 the United Synagogue published The Voice Of Prayer And Praise, a compendium of synagogue music dominated by Mombach's work. It purports to be the definitive compendium of his compositions and arrangements, but there is much in it claimed for Mombach that he did not compose (nor perhaps even arrange), including certain melodies which other sources would indicate had been in use at the Great in at least 1800 if not earlier.

A great deal of the Ashkenazi synagogue service music was composed by him, and he remains a consistent source of melodies for services throughout the Jewish year (see The Voice Of Prayer And Praise, United Synagogue, London, 1933). Some of his compositions, such as Mechalkeil for Yamim Noraim, Baruch Haba (processional), and Ladonai Ha'aretz (Psalm 24), have become 'standard' pieces in Anglo-Jewish communities, where they are still regularly sung.

Mombach melodies are sung in English-speaking communities the world over (with the general exception of the USA) by appreciative congregations who have almost certainly never heard of him by name and do not know that what they are singing is anything other than 'traditional'. Indeed, they may well be traditional in origin. Mombach's setting of Ma'oz Tzur is an arrangement of an earlier piece, parts of which come from a chorale by Martin Luther (the Christian reformer) Nun freut Euch Ihr lieben Christen. Luther had, in his turn, adapted an old German folksong So weiss ich eins was mich erfreut, das pluemlein auff preyter heyde.

Mombach's influence extended beyond London to the whole of England and beyond into the Empire. He was noted as a fine pianist. Beyond the two synagogues, he taught Chazanut (the cantor's art) at Jews' College and he also taught singing to the pupils of the Sabbath classes of the Association for Religious Instruction. He conducted concerts at the Jewish Workingmen's Club in Aldgate, and served as a member of the Committee for the Diffusion of Religious Knowledge.

Mombach arranged choirs for all the main events that took place in the religious life of the Ashkenazi communities throughout England, and many of his pupils went on to become cantors in English and colonial synagogues. With the exception of those selections written in the traditional modes, most of his settings are a blend of the popular German and English folk song.

Tunkel (2012) writing on the Zemel Choir's website, says that "Mombach is very singable (in melody and harmony) and it is for that reason that so much has indeed survived as the traditional backbone of Anglo-Jewish synagogue music. His compositional style owes quite a bit to Mendelssohn, and it is noteworthy that motifs from Elijah appear in a number of his pieces."

Roth (1950) summarises his importance by saying that as a composer of synagogue music Mombach was equalled only by Solomon Sulzer of Vienna, and a large proportion of the now-famous Anglo-Jewish choral melodies were first familiarised by him and his collaborators. To him is due in large measure that dignified, simple tradition of sacred music which, spreading from the Great Synagogue, has become characteristic of the Anglo-Jewish synagogal tradition everywhere to our own day.

== Recordings ==
The Zemel Choir recorded one of his several settings for Psalm 24 (L'Dovid Mizmor) on The English Tradition of Jewish Choral Music.

Several of his pieces (including the Boruch Habo) are included in a recording of Music of the Victorian Synagogue by the London Jewish Male Choir and The Old Synagogue Singers.
