= Michael Adler =

English Orthodox rabbi, historian and author (1868-1944)

The Rev Michael Adler DSO, SCF
- Rev Michael Adler in 1918

Minister of Hammersmith and West Kensington Synagogue
- In office 1890–1903

Minister of Central Synagogue, London
- In office 1903–1934
- Title: Rabbi

Personal life
- Born: Michael Adler; 27 July 1868 Spitalfields, London, England
- Died: 30 September 1944 (aged 76) Bournemouth, England
- Resting place: Willesden Jewish Cemetery
- Spouse: Sophie Eckersdorf (m. 1891, died 1912), Bertha Lorie (m. 1920)
- Children: Sidney Michael Adler, Lilian Rosalie Marion Adler, Rosalind Sophia Adler
- Notable work: British Jewry Book of Honour
- Education: London School of Jewish Studies, University College London
- Occupation: Rabbi, Anglo-Jewish historian, author

Religious life
- Religion: Judaism
- Denomination: Orthodox Judaism

Jewish leader
- Awards: Companion of the Distinguished Service Order (DSO)

Michael Adler DSO, SCF (27 July 1868 – 30 September 1944) was an English Orthodox rabbi, an Anglo-Jewish historian and author who was the first Jewish military chaplain to the British Army to serve in time of war, serving with the British Expeditionary Force on the Western Front during the First World War from 1915 to 1918. He was responsible for the Magen David being carved on the headstones of Jewish soldiers who died in wartime instead of the traditional Cross.

== Early life ==
Born in Spitalfields in London in 1868, one of eight children of Dutch-born Betje (Betsey) née Van Der Poorten (1838–1883) and Abraham Joseph Adler (1828–1900), a Polish tailor, he was not related to the prominent rabbis Nathan Adler or Hermann Adler. Michael Adler attended Jews' College and University College London graduating Bachelor of Arts (BA). Adler was appointed minister of the Hammersmith and West Kensington Synagogue, London, in 1890 aged 22. In 1891 in London he married German-born Sophie Eckersdorf (1869–1912) and with her had three children: Sidney Michael Adler (1893–1962), Lilian Rosalie Marion Adler (1895–1970) and Rosalind Sophia Adler (1899–1973). He became honorary chaplain at Wormwood Scrubs Prison, and Senior Master of Hebrew at the Jews' Free School in 1893. At this early stage in his career he wrote Elements of Hebrew Grammar (1st ed. 1897, 2d ed. 1899), and Students' Hebrew Grammar (1899). He contributed various articles to The Jewish Quarterly Review and the Transactions of the Jewish Historical Society of England. In 1903 he was appointed minister of the Central Synagogue in London W1, a position he held until his retirement in 1934. His book The History of the Central Synagogue, 1855–1905 was published in 1905 by The Jewish Chronicle Office.

== Army Chaplain 1904–1915 ==
Rev Michael Adler in about 1914

Jews were only recognised in the British Army as a distinct religious group from 1889. The Visitation Committee of the United Synagogue were responsible for the religious welfare and spiritual needs of Jews in public bodies and it decided to include serving members of the British Forces in its remit and applied to the War Office for the appointment of a Jewish chaplain. This request was granted in 1892 when Rev Francis Lyon Cohen (1862–1934), minister of the Borough Synagogue, became the first minister to serve as a Jewish chaplain to the British Army, holding the position from 1892 to 1904 when he was succeeded by Michael Adler. Adler became a commissioned chaplain with the rank of captain in the Territorial Force (London and Eastern Command), attending summer camps on Salisbury Plain where he conducted services for Jewish soldiers. At first the duties of the Jewish chaplains were part-time and included an annual Hanukkah military service initiated by Rabbi Cohen. In 1914 Adler officiated at the funeral of Mrs Minnie Solomon at the Jewish Cemetery in Aldershot in Hampshire who had done voluntary work among the Jewish soldiers in that military town.

== War Service 1915–1918 ==
When World War I began in August 1914 many young Jews volunteered for the Army ahead of conscription and Adler realised that his chaplaincy had to become full-time so he applied to the War Office to serve on the Western Front with the British Expeditionary Force as a Jewish chaplain. The War Office refused as there had not been a serving Jewish chaplain in wartime before. In the first month of the War Adler wrote a Soldiers' Prayer Book which Chief Rabbi Joseph Hertz (who visited France in June 1915) later enlarged. Adler requested the War Office that he be allowed to visit to the Western Front to assess the need of a Jewish chaplain there, which he did in January 1915. After he wrote a report for the War Office he was granted permission to serve on the Western Front, where initially he was the only Jewish chaplain.

The Chaplain General, John Taylor Smith (1860–1938), suggested that instead of the usual Christian chaplain's badge, the Rev Adler should wear a Magen David to make him easier to identify, and soon after arriving at the Front Adler arranged for Jewish military graves to be similarly marked with a Magen David rather than the traditional Cross. Adler gained the support of Jewish communities in Paris, Havre, Rouen, Versailles and Boulogne. With financial support from Jews in Britain he arranged that the suppliers of matzah for French Jewish soldiers should also supply 1,200 British Jewish soldiers. The matzah did not materialise and three months after Pesach in 1915 he received a letter asking what was to be done with the special food that was awaiting distribution.

As there were so few Jewish chaplains often the burial service of a Jewish soldier was conducted by a Christian chaplain. To assist them in this Adler wrote out the Jewish Burial Service in English and sent out copies to the Christian chaplains. Adler quickly realised that more Jewish chaplains were needed at the Front and he claimed that Jewish soldiers often did not receive the services of a chaplain for months, unlike the Christian soldiers who attended a weekly church parade. He persuaded the War Office to provide additional chaplains, and as the area occupied by the British Army overseas increased so did the number of chaplains, so that by the end of the war there was a chaplain attached to each of the five Army areas and three at the Bases. Adler held services in villages several miles from the trenches and men frequently came to these straight from the firing line. He also held services before large battles including a Yom Kippur service at Noeuz-les-Mines in 1915, one week before the Battle of Loos. He kept a register of casualties and sent details of the deaths of Jewish soldiers to their families. As memorials were erected over the graves of Jewish soldiers Adler took photographs to send to their relatives; he travelled long distances to conduct funeral services and visited wounded soldiers in hospitals.

Adler served for much of World War I as Senior Chaplain to the Forces (SCF) on the Western Front. In July 1918 his health broke and he returned to the UK with the rank of major, commenting to a colleague that after he left the Front the Allies succeeded. His successor as Senior Jewish Chaplain was the minister of Bayswater Synagogue, the Rev. Arthur Barnett. Adler was appointed a Companion of the Distinguished Service Order (DSO) for his service during WWI. Adler returned to his position as minister of the Central Synagogue in London where he remained until his retirement in 1934.

== Later years ==
In 1920 in Birmingham in England he married Bertha Lorie. Adler undertook the monumental task of recording the names and units of the approximately 50,000 British Jewish soldiers and sailors of the Empire and Dominions who had served, been killed or been decorated during World War I. This was published as the definitive work British Jewry Book of Honour (1922) with each copy being individually numbered; the book is now a collector's item. In his later years Adler was very involved with the Jewish Historical Society of England, serving as Editor, and President (1934–1936). An Anglo-Jewish historian, Adler wrote on the Jews of Medieval England including a biography of the prominent medieval Anglo-Jewish financier Aaron of York, while his 'History of the Domus Conversorum' put the study of the Middle Period in Anglo-Jewish history on a new basis. These papers were mostly published in his 1939 volume of essays The Jews of Medieval England. He was the Chairman of the Jewish Central Lads' Club.

Rabbi Michael Adler died in a nursing home in Bournemouth in 1944, aged 76, and was buried in Willesden Jewish Cemetery.
