= Manor Park, Aldershot =

Urban park in Aldershot in Hampshire

Coordinates: 51.244°N 0.756°W

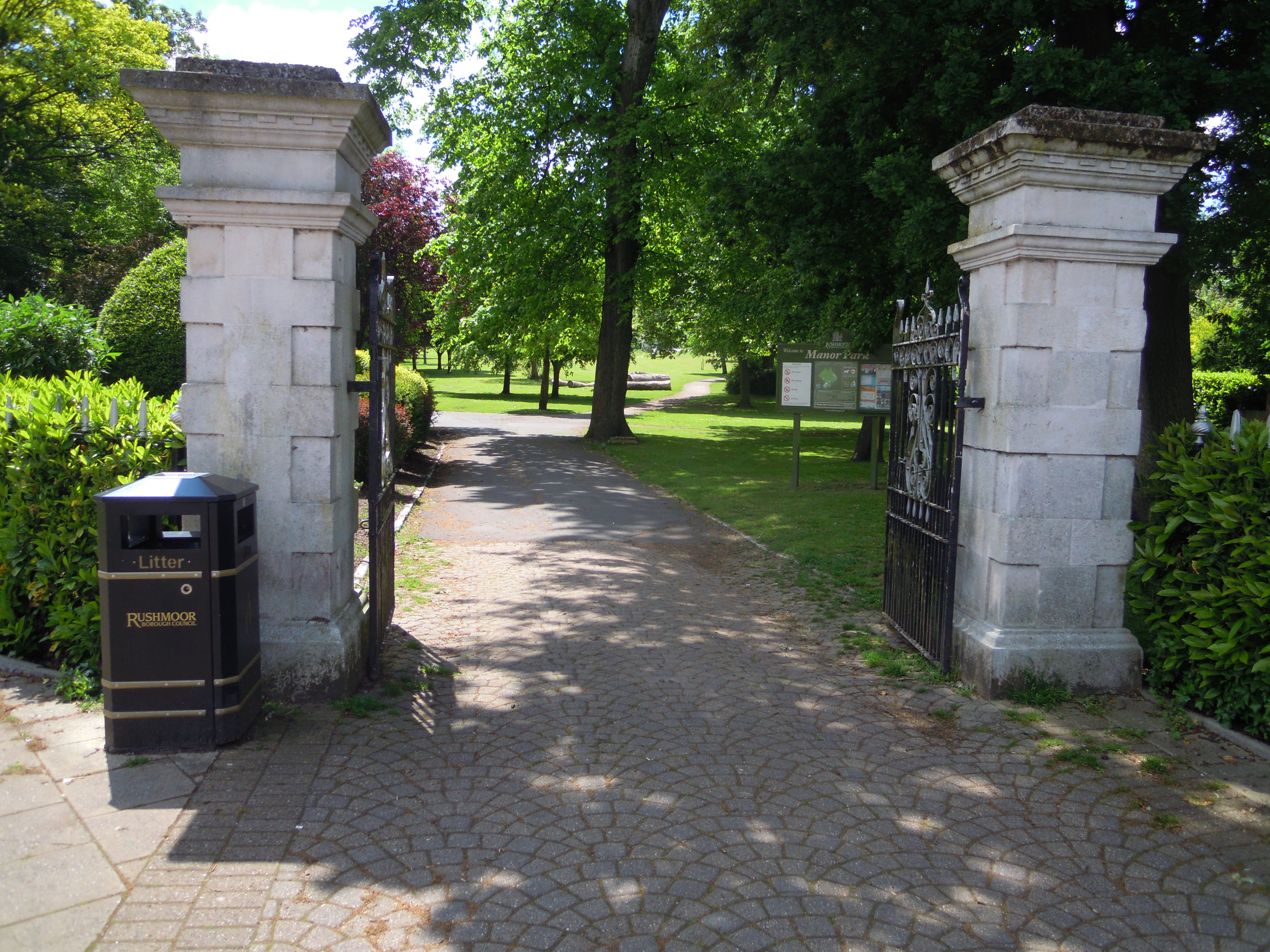
The gates to Manor Park

Manor Park is an urban park in the town of Aldershot in Hampshire. A short walk from the town centre, it has been a public park since 1919. The former manor house located in the park is Grade II listed. Facilities include a play area, tennis and basketball courts and an all-concrete skate park designed and built by Fearless Ramps and which opened in 2013. Today Manor Park is owned and maintained by Rushmoor Borough Council. Since 2018 Manor Park has been the venue for the annual Picnic & Pop Music Festival. The festival has been attended by 5000 local people each year.

== History ==
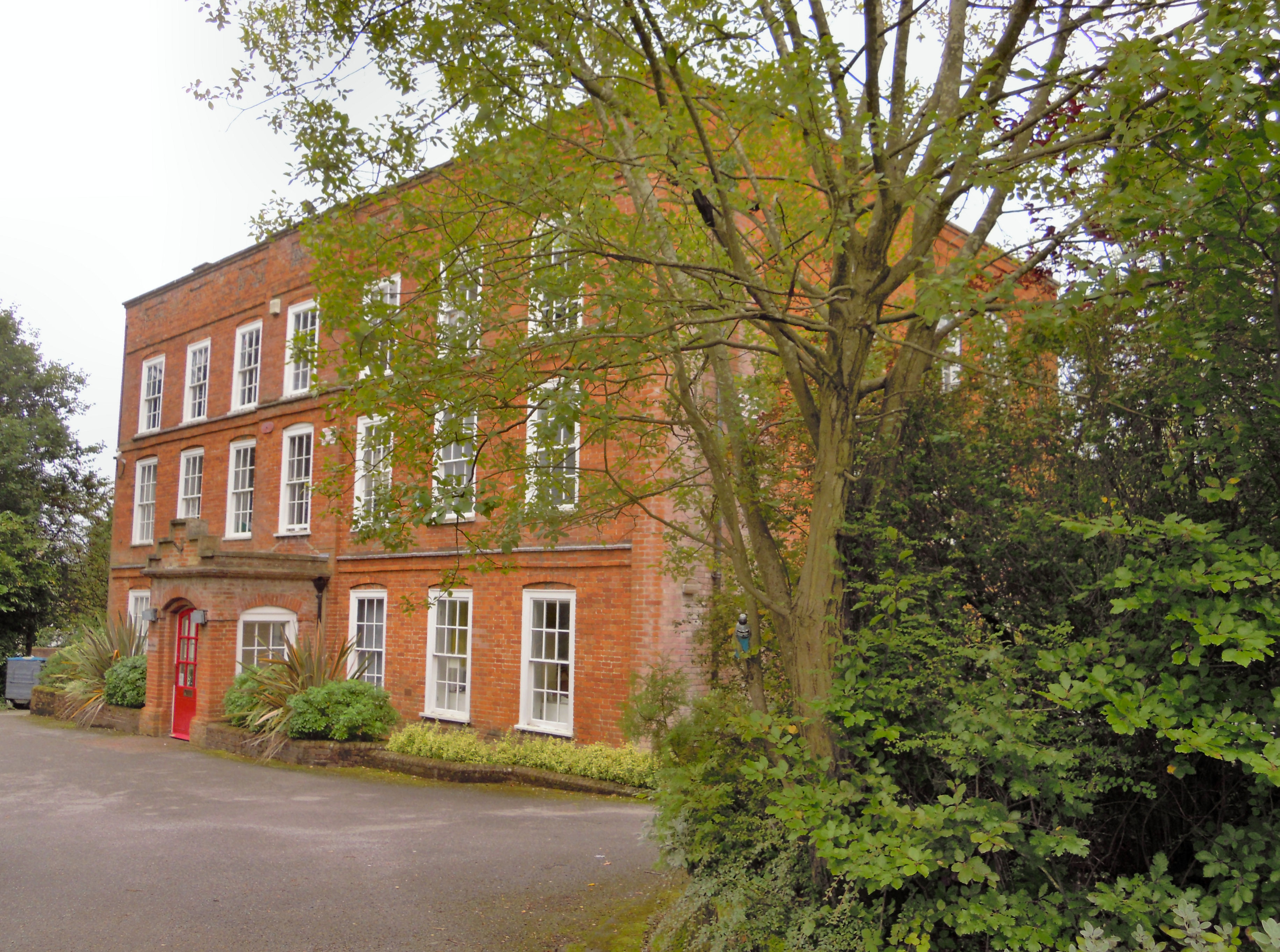
The former Manor House

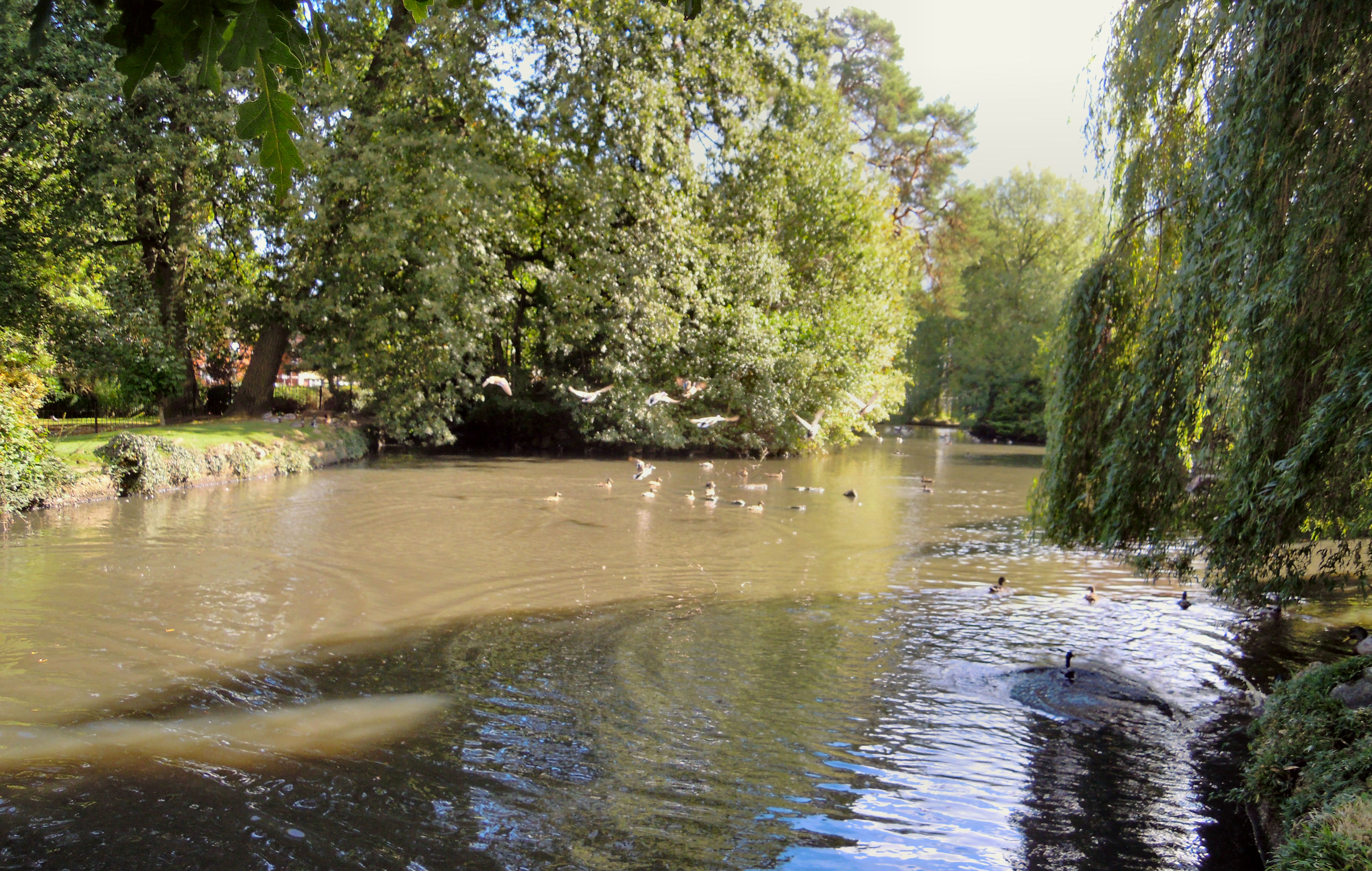
The duck pond in Manor Park

The 63 acre Manor Park was purchased by the Aldershot Urban District Council in 1919. The park is close to the site of the old village of Aldershot with a history dating back to Anglo-Saxon times. On the park's perimeter is the original village green and the old parish church of St Michael the Archangel.

The impressive red-bricked three-storey building Manor House located in the park was built in 1670 and was occupied by the Tichborne family, who had previously occupied an older manor house in Aldershot Park. Another mansion had been built in 1629 as a sub-manor by the senior branch of the Tichborne family, later used as the Aldershot Workhouse.

After being sold by the Tichbornes the manor house was home to three generations of the Newcome family, starting with Captain George Newcome, Aldershot’s first magistrate, who bought the estate in 1847. It was his descendant, Captain Newcome RN, who sold the park and manor house to Aldershot Urban District Council in 1919.

For some years the building served as the Register Office for Aldershot; among those who married here was Violette Szabo GC who married the Free French soldier Étienne Szabo at Aldershot Register Office on 21 August 1940 after a whirlwind 42-day romance. Here too, in 1942, the New Zealand nuclear scientist Clifford Dalton married the scientist and author Catherine Graves (daughter of the writer Robert Graves). It was made a Grade II listed building in 1963 and is now private offices.

Running across the park is a long path bordered by mature trees. Known as The Major’s Walk, it was planted by Major Newcome, one of the last owners of the Manor, with a variety of trees some of which he brought back from his military service abroad. The fenced duck pond is fed by a natural spring.

== Tragedy in the park ==
=== Ada Field ===
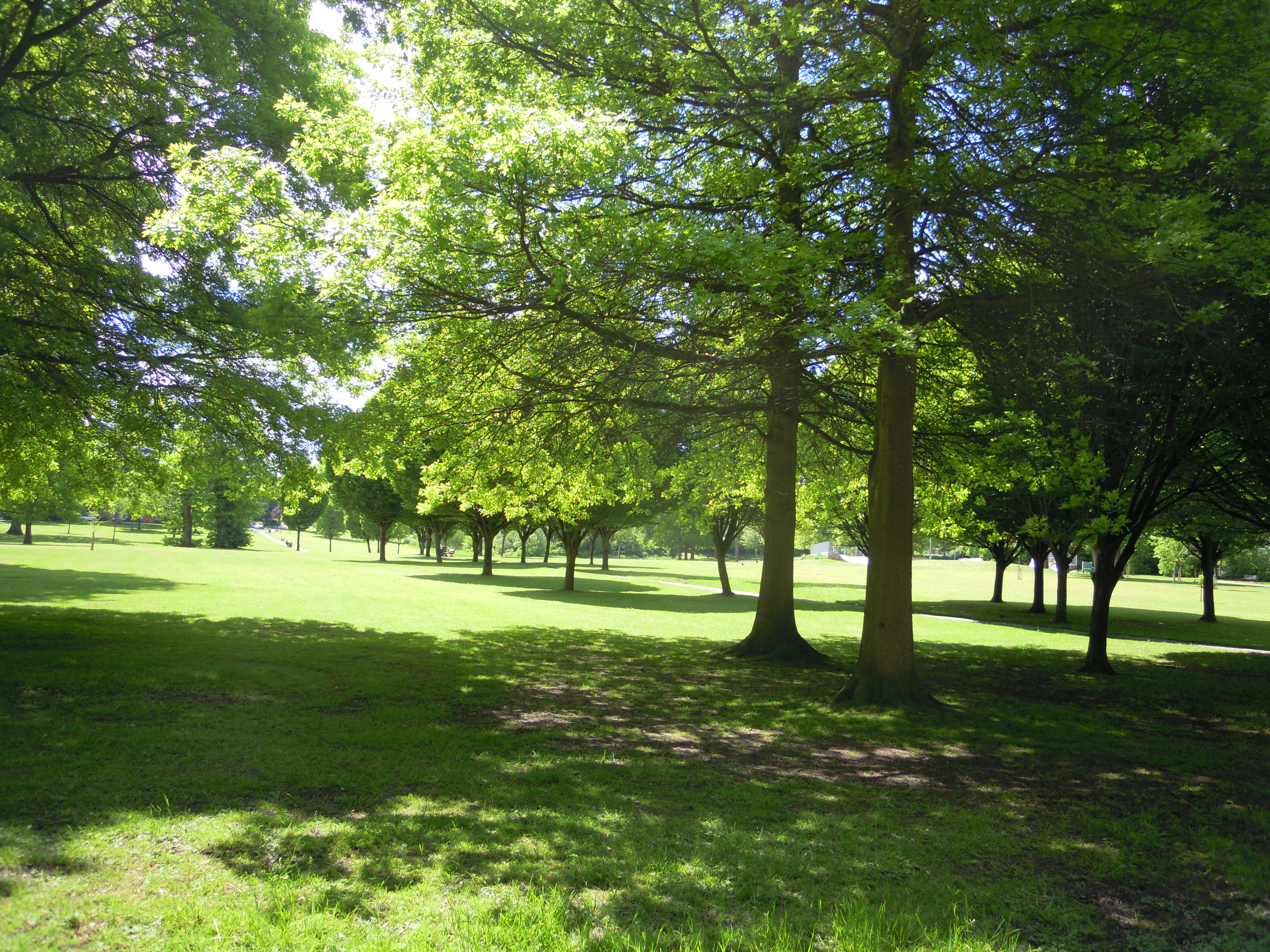
The Major's Walk cuts across the park

Here on August Bank Holiday in 1922 during a crowded Firemen's Fete was murdered Miss Ada Field, aged 29, a bank clerk who for a time had been engaged to William George Warren, aged 23, a clerk in the same bank. They separated, however, and Miss Field then became engaged to Aldershot-born Mr Fredrick Carl Reimers (1898-1978).

A week before their planned wedding in the nearby parish church the couple were seated in the reserved enclosure in Manor Park when Warren, who was seated behind her, shot Miss Field through the back, the bullet entering her spine and coming out beneath her chin. Warren then shot himself.

Ada Field was buried in Aldershot Cemetery before a crowd of over one thousand mourners.

=== Baby M ===
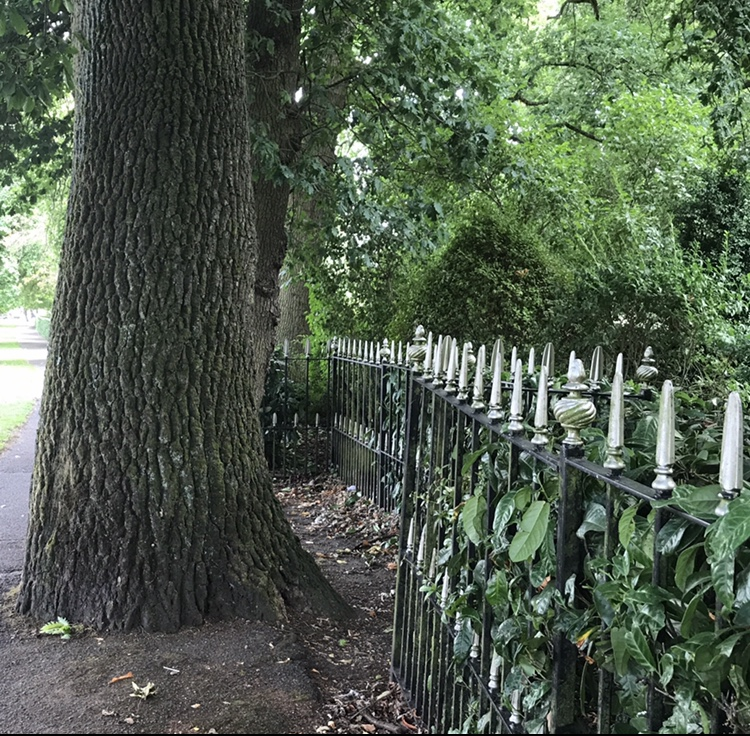
The location of the birth and killing of Baby M on the High Street in Aldershot

Here also on 19 May 2017 in a case that made national news was found the body of 'Baby M', which had been hidden in bushes and who had been beaten to death within six hours of birth, suffering multiple blunt force injuries to the head with other minor injuries to her body. The baby's body had the umbilical cord and placenta placed on it. A DNA profile taken from the baby showed that both she and her mother and possibly also the child’s father, were of East Asian origin. In January 2018 police released CCTV footage of two people they wished to speak to in relation to the birth and murder of the child. This footage showed a couple walking up and down nearby Ash Road 10 times in an hour on 15 May 2017. The mother gave birth to the baby behind two trees just outside the park near to the spot where its body was found.

In March 2020 five people were arrested in the Aldershot area in connection with the murder. In July 2020 23-year old care home worker Babita Rai was charged with the murder of her baby following which she appeared at Winchester Crown Court. She was remanded in custody to appear at the court in August 2020. Rai had only entered the U.K. from Nepal shortly before the murder. She was six months pregnant on her arrival.

In May 2021 Babita Rai was found guilty of infanticide but not guilty of murder. The Infanticide Act 1938 defines the offence as an alternative to murder, when a mother kills her baby while the balance of her mind is disturbed as a result of the birth.

== Heroes' Shrine ==
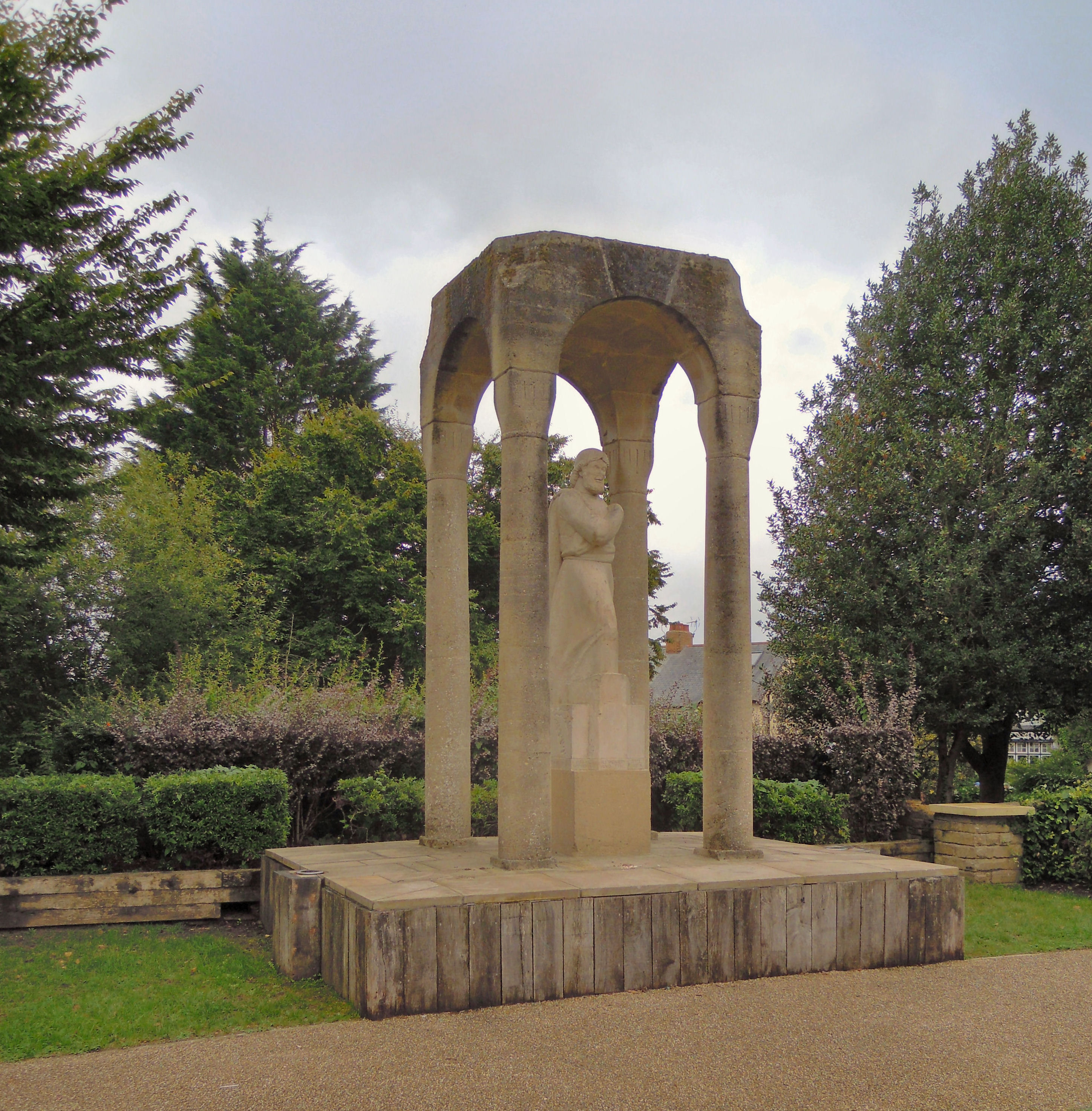
Statue of Christ calming the storm

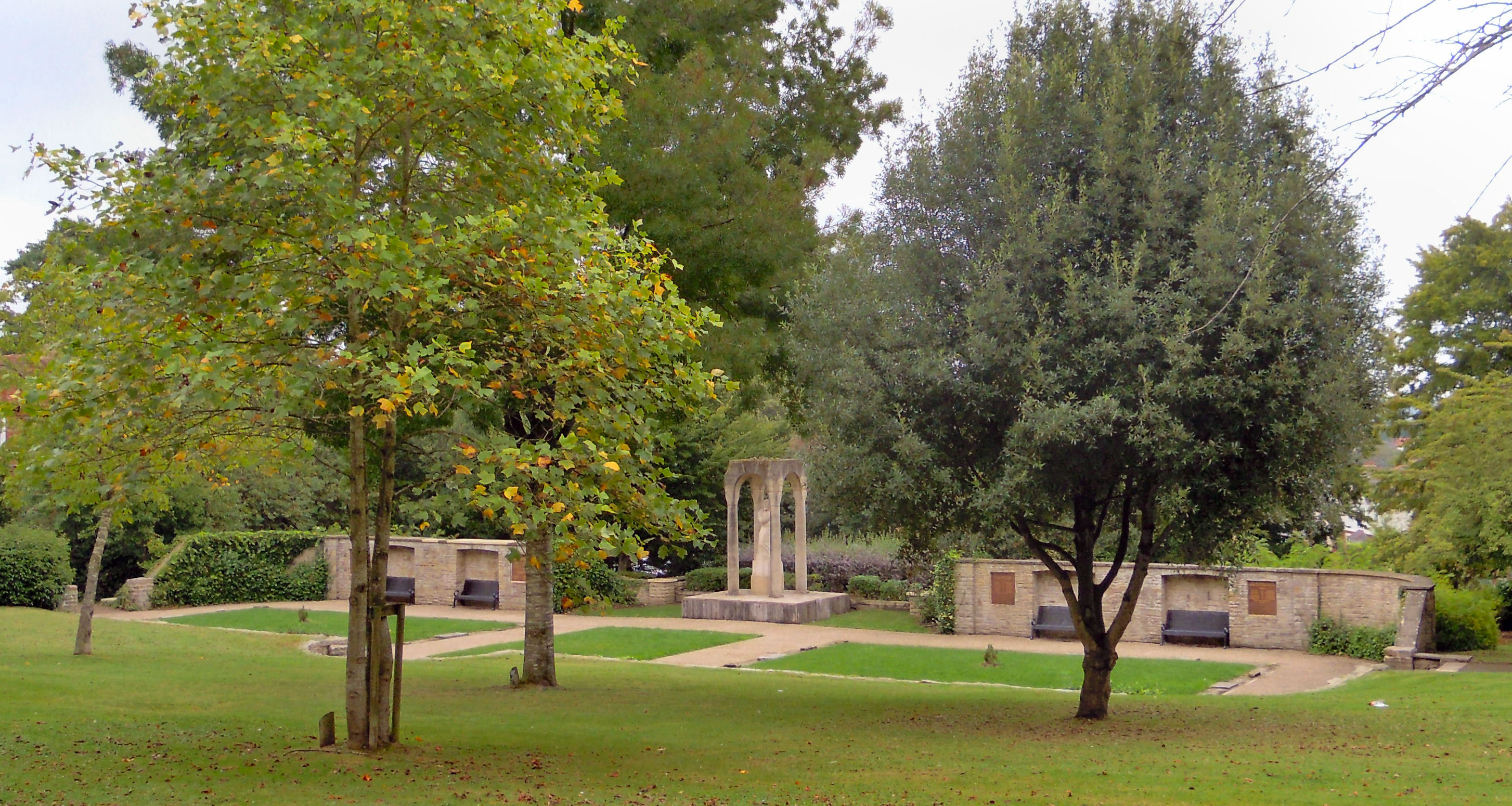
The Heroes' Shrine

Located in the park is a sunken walled-garden known as the Heroes' Shrine with a large modern statue in Portland stone of Christ calming the storm. The statue is carved from a block rejected by Sir Christopher Wren in the building of St Paul's Cathedral. The statue was carved by Josephina de Vasconcellos to a design by the Borough Surveyor F.W. Taylor. Around the base the inscription reads: “He cometh in righteousness to judge the world with his truth, he rebuked the wind and the sea, he maketh war to cease in all the world”. The memorial was constructed by Messrs. Perryman & Co of Woking at a cost of £3,200, while the inscriptions on the statue and stones were done by Messrs. E. Finch and Sons of High Street, Aldershot.

Aldershot's national memorial, this area serves as both a war memorial and a place of remembrance for the Battle of Britain and the civilians killed in bombing raids across the UK during World War II, particularly during The Blitz.

Originally mounds of masonry were located here salvaged from destroyed buildings from 18 cities and 34 boroughs, including Coventry Cathedral and the Tower of London, with each stone inscribed with the name of the city or area of London from which it came. Today only a few of these remain, cemented into the ground. The monument was unveiled on the 5th May 1950 by the Duchess of Gloucester.

Near this is a rough-hewn stone monument commemorating the dead of World War I with the inscription, “Their Name Liveth For Evermore 1914- 1919”.

In the 1990s the Heroes’ Shrine was refurbished and the stones re-positioned to the present layout. Josephina de Vasconcellos was still alive so, although then in her 90s, she was able to oversee the restoration of her sculpture.

On 8 November 2018 a Peace Garden was opened nearby in the park by Rushmoor Borough Council to commemorate the Armistice of 1918 which ended World War I.

== See also ==
- Aldershot Park
- Brickfields Country Park
- Municipal Gardens, Aldershot
- Princes Gardens, Aldershot
- Rowhill Nature Reserve
