= Pfungstadt =

- Town
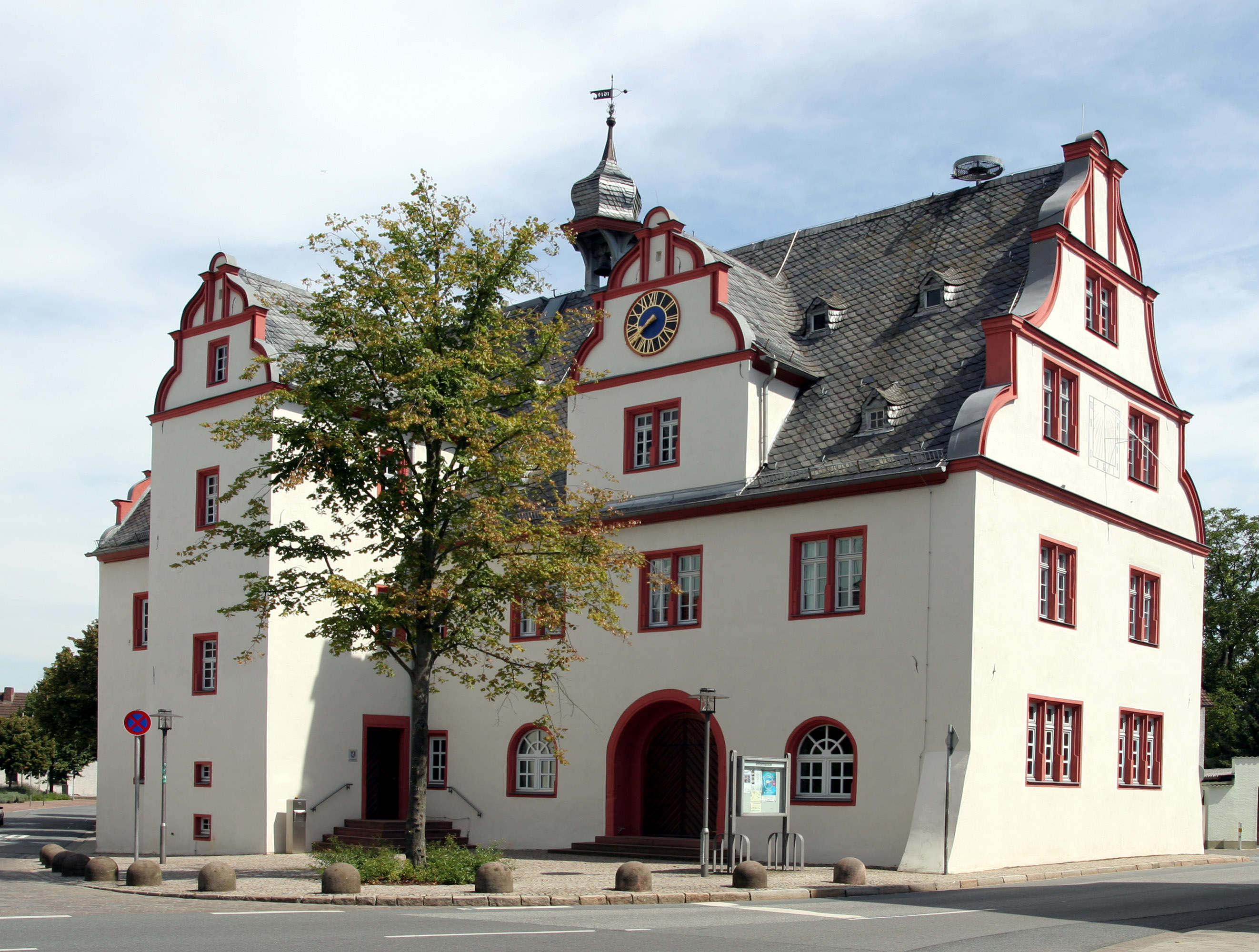
- Old town hall

- Coat of arms

- Location of Pfungstadt within Darmstadt-Dieburg district
- Interactive map of Pfungstadt
- Location within Germany Location within Hesse
- Coordinates: 49°48′20″N 8°36′16″E
- Country: Germany
- State: Hesse
- Admin. region: Darmstadt
- District: Darmstadt-Dieburg

Government
  - Mayor (2019–25): Patrick Koch (SPD)

Area
  - Total: 42.54 km^{2} (16.42 sq mi)
- Elevation: 103 m (338 ft)

Population (2025-12-31)
  - Total: 25,475
  - Density: 598.8/km^{2} (1,551/sq mi)
- Time zone: UTC+01:00 (CET)
  - Summer (DST): UTC+02:00 (CEST)
- Postal codes: 64310–64319
- Dialling codes: 06157
- Vehicle registration: DA
- Website: www.pfungstadt.de

Pfungstadt (German pronunciation: [ˈpfʊŋˌʃtat]) is a town of 25,029 inhabitants (2020), in the district of Darmstadt-Dieburg in the state of Hesse, Germany.

== History ==
The town was first mentioned in 785 as property of the Monastery of Lorsch and got its town rights in 1886 due to its railway station. It is situated just west of the Odenwald hills, one of the closest being Frankenstein with its castle ruin of monstrous fame (Mary Shelley) on its summit. It is said Shelley used the name after asking a sailor on a Rhine trip to tell her the name of "this yonder castle".

== Economy ==
Pfungstadt is most famous today for its beer, Pfungstädter, which can be found all over Germany. The Brewery has a long history.

Sadly, after 192 years this heritage came to an end in December 2023 when the brewery was forced to relocate out of the city after the land was sold for future residential development.

== Transport ==
Regional service of Pfungstadt Railway (Pfungstadtbahn) to Darmstadt Hauptbahnhof was reactivated at the beginning of 2012. It is served by the extension of services on the Odenwald Railway (Odenwaldbahn) from Darmstadt station to Pfungstadt as RB 66.

Buses (VIA25222, VIA25224, Bus P and Bus PE) also serve Pfungstadt. The Pfungstadt bus station is on Berliner Street. The Bundesautobahn 5 freeway is to the west of town. The main road near the town are to the east B3 and the Bundesautobahn 5 freeway. To the west of town is the Bundesautobahn 67 freeway.

== Sport ==
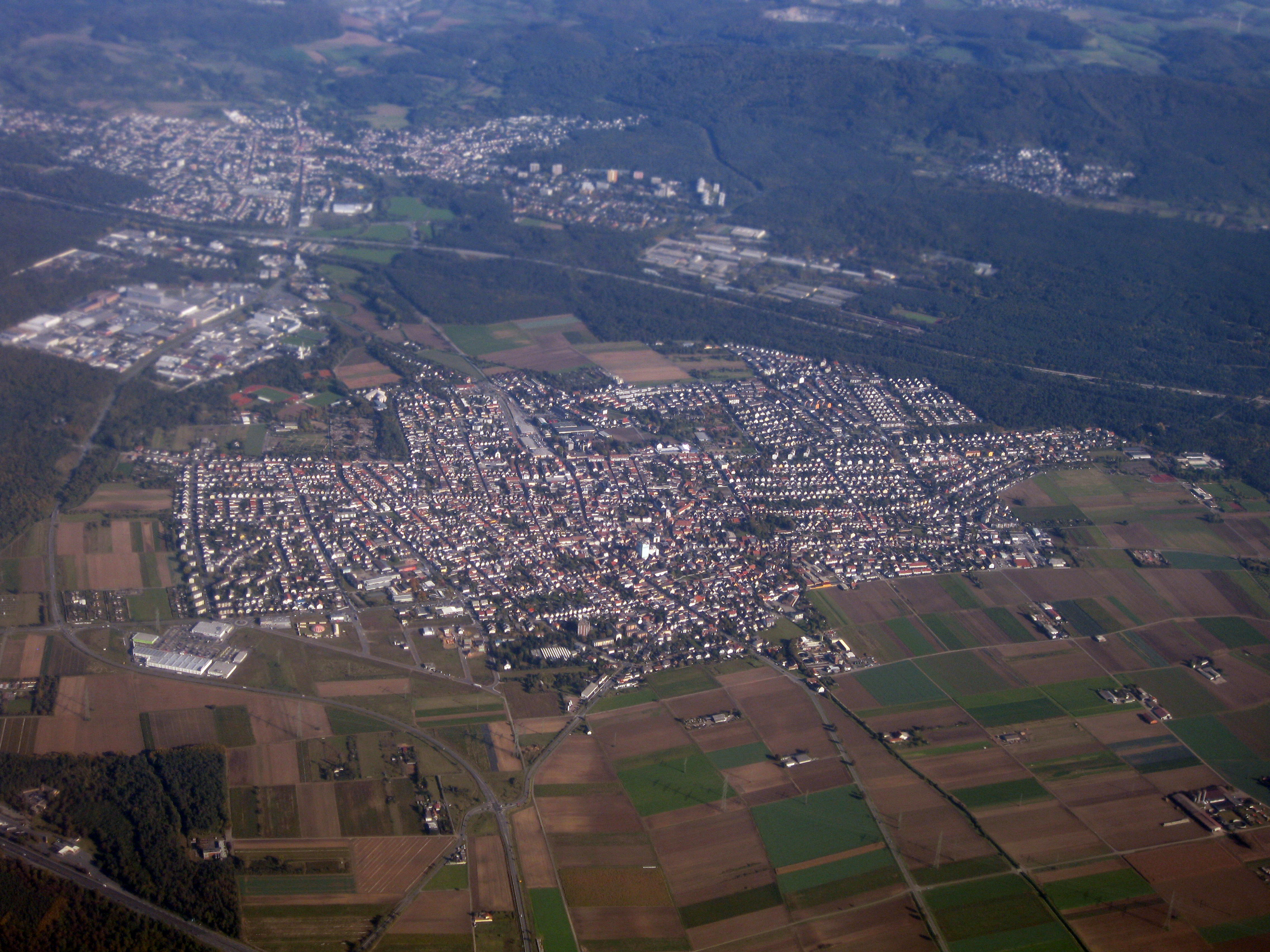
Aerial view

The swimming pool was known far and wide, with a modern wave generation feature which was loved by young and old. The town had to close the pool due to a lack of funds required for major maintenance projects.

== Sights ==
The historical town hall is the centre of the old part of the town, which in 1664 was being developed with a view to allowing the river Modau to flow above ground as basis for a promenade.

== Culture ==
In 1973, the town hosted the 13th Hessentag state festival. It will host the 60th edition in 2023 as well.

== Twin towns – sister cities ==
Pfungstadt is twinned with:

- Bassetlaw, England, United Kingdom
- Figline e Incisa Valdarno, Italy
- Gradignan, France
- Hévíz, Hungary

== Notable people ==
- Julius Mombach (1813–1880), English synagogue composer
