= Francis Lyon Cohen =

Rabbi and musicologist (1862–1934)

Francis Lyon Cohen in 1920

Francis Lyon Cohen VD (14 November 1862 – 26 April 1934) was an English Orthodox rabbi, author and expert on Hebrew music, being the music editor of The Jewish Encyclopedia (1901–06). The Jewish Lads' Brigade was his brainchild. He was the first Jewish chaplain in the British Army, a position he held from 1892 to 1904 when he was succeeded by Rev Michael Adler. Cohen ended his career as Chief Minister of the Great Synagogue in Sydney, Australia.

== Early years ==
Cohen was born above the family shop on the High Street in Aldershot in Hampshire in 1862, the eldest son of Russian-born and naturalised-British subject Woolf Henry Cohen, marine store dealer, pawnbroker and later a tobacco manufacturer, and his Polish-born wife Harriett, née Phillips, the daughter of Aldershot businessman Moses Phillips, a watchmaker and jeweller. Cohen was educated at Jews' College and University College London, which he left without completing his degree. In 1883 he passed the intermediate music examination of the University of London as a private student. Cohen became minister of the congregation in South Hackney (1883-1885), then of that in Dublin (1885–86), and from 1886 officiated at the Borough New Synagogue, London. On 14 December 1886 at the Great Synagogue in London he married Russian-born Rose Hast (1860-1934), daughter of Rev. Marcus Hast, the celebrated Reader of that synagogue, and with her had three children: Harold Reuben Cohen, Basil H Cohen and Dulcie M Cohen.

In 1886 he was appointed a tutor in Jews' College; in 1892 he became acting chaplain to the Jews in the British army; and in 1896 staff chaplain to the Jewish Lads' Brigade, the formation of which he was the first to advocate. He has also acted as editor to the choir committee of the United Synagogue. Cohen organized military services on Ḥanukkah at his own and other synagogues, and altogether did much to promote the patriotic and military ardour of English Jews. With B. L. Mosely he was the author of A Handbook of Synagogue Music for Congregational Singing (1889) and, with David M. Davis, of The Voice Of Prayer And Praise (1899 and 1914), affectionally known as ‘The Blue Book’. In addition, he wrote numerous articles on Jewish music, among which have been: 'Synagogue Music; Its History and Character' in The Jewish Chronicle (1883); 'The Rise and Development of Synagogue Music' (1887); 'Synagogue Plain-Song' in The Organist and Choirmaster (1897); 'La Revue de Chant Grégorien' (Marseilles, 1899); 'Song in the Synagogue' in The Musical Times (London, 1899), and 'Traditional Hebrew Melodies' (1896). Under his own name and the nom de plume Asaph Klesmer he wrote articles in the Jewish press and for the commemorative volume of the Anglo-Jewish Historical Exhibition (1887) and the Jewish Historical Society of England (1894).

== Jewish Lads' Brigade ==
In April 1891 The Jewish Chronicle published a letter from Cohen headed ´But what about the boys?´ in which he called for the creation of a Jewish youth group based on the Boys' Brigade for the well-being of working-class Jewish boys in the East End of London at the important period ´"Between their leaving school and their attainment of manhood". Colonel Albert Goldsmid brought this idea to fruition in 1895 with the formation of the Jewish Lads' Brigade with which Cohen served as staff chaplain from 1896.

== Military chaplain (1892–1904) ==
Cohen leading a military Hanukkah service in 1901

Jews were only recognised in the British Army as a distinct religious group from 1889. The Visitation Committee of the United Synagogue were responsible for the religious welfare and spiritual needs of Jews in public bodies and it decided to include serving members of the British Forces in its remit and applied to the War Office for the appointment of a Jewish military chaplain. This request was granted in 1892 when Cohen, then the minister of the Borough Synagogue, became the first Jewish chaplain to the British Army; following this Lord Rothschild gave him a letter of introduction to General Sir Evelyn Wood, who was in charge of the Camp at Aldershot and who appointed Cohen as chaplain to Jewish troops at Aldershot.

Having been born and brought up in Aldershot at a time when the town was rapidly growing due to the arrival of the British Army Cohen was already very familiar with military life. At first the duties of the Jewish chaplain were part-time and in December 1893 Cohen initiated an annual Hanukkah military service, holding the first in his own Borough Synagogue; by the time of the Boer War these were attended by the Lord Mayor of London, the Aldermen of London and the Chief Rabbi. He also attended summer camps on Salisbury Plain where he conducted services for Jewish soldiers, later involving senior students of Jews’ College in helping to conduct these services, which were eventually transferred to Saturday, the Jewish Sabbath. Cohen wrote a letter to The Jewish Chronicle publicising these services and asking Jewish servicemen and their relatives to contact him and declare their religion. At the same time, in an attempt to quell allegations that Jews were not patriotic, Cohen launched a campaign to encourage Jews to enlist in the army and navy, believing that only through joining the forces could the Jewish community prove its loyalty to Britain.

Of the reluctance of Jewish servicemen to identify themselves Cohen wrote:

"I had noticed, in my boyhood near Aldershot Camp, that Jewish soldiers and sailors almost invariably concealed their origin because of outside prejudices, and still more through their own people’s feeling about the difficulties in observing certain religious duties, and the dislike of all uniforms so natural in our people who had come to England from countries where authority condones such cruel oppression.”

In 1895 he was able to report:

"About thirty-two Jewish regulars and militia-men at Aldershot, and twenty-eight at other stations, have come under my notice during two years of officiation, quite fifty of whom are at present serving in the army. Some ten or eleven Jewish recruits joined the troops at Aldershot during 1894. It would appear that between sixty and seventy Jews enlisted during the year. I estimate that there are not quite two hundred Jews in the Army, and that by the end of the century the number will reach and perhaps exceed four hundred...[however] many of the Jews, as in the case of the other smaller religious bodies, prefer to ‘follow the big drum’, i.e. attend the general C of E parade”.

Cohen held the position of music editor of The Jewish Encyclopedia (1901–06) and Jewish chaplain to the British Army from 1892 to 1904, in which year he prepared to leave for Australia to take up the position of Chief Minister of the Great Synagogue in Sydney; he was succeeded as Jewish chaplain by Rev Michael Adler.

== Great Synagogue in Sydney ==
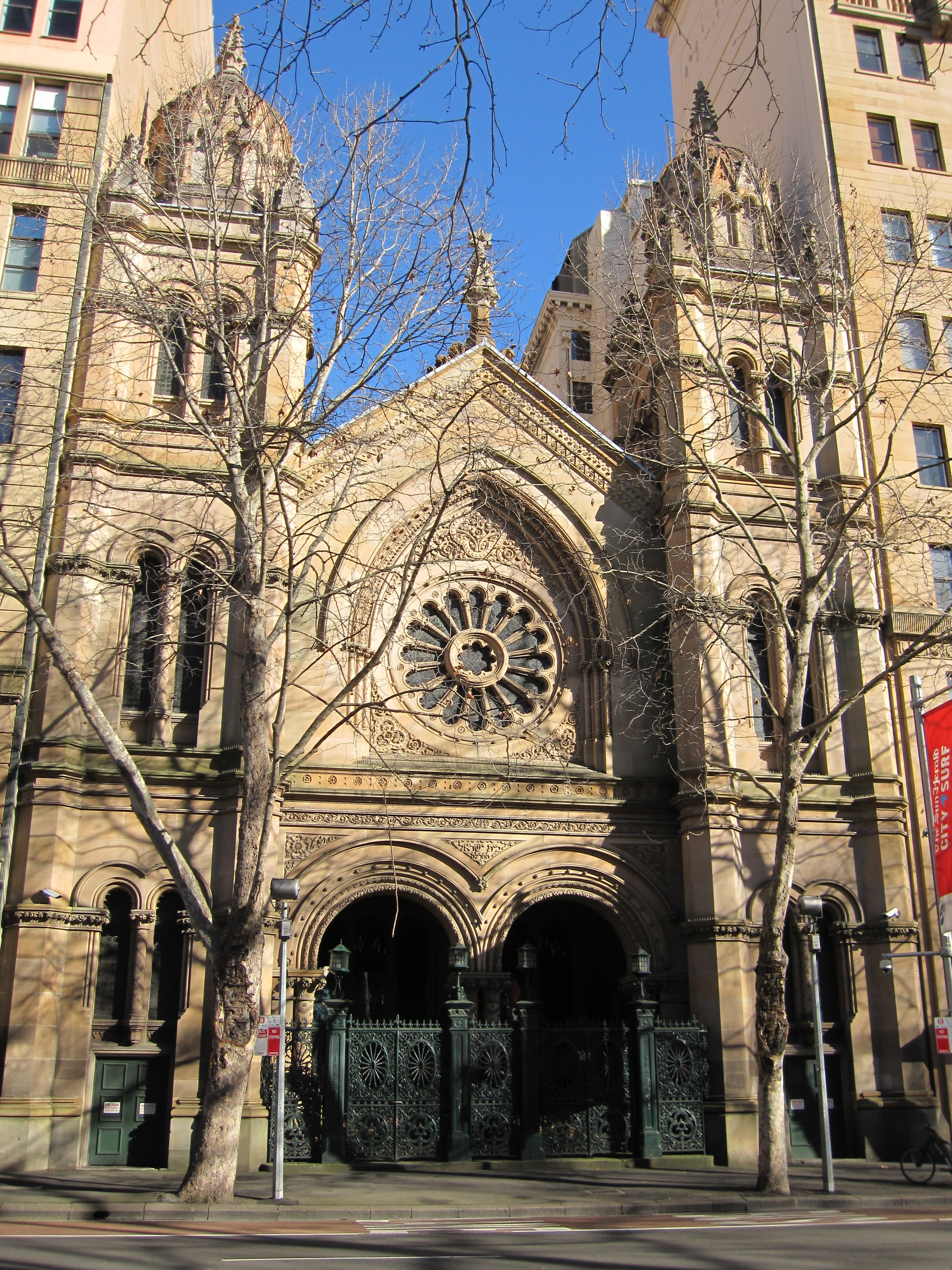
Cohen was Chief Minister of the Great Synagogue in Sydney for nearly 30 years

Wishing for a new challenge in 1904 Cohen was appointed as Chief Minister of the Great Synagogue in Sydney, the mother congregation of Jewry in Australia. Before leaving Britain for this new role Cohen had to attain full rabbinical qualifications so that he could lead the Sydney Beth Din but he did not find it easy to gain them as obstacles were placed in his way, perhaps out of jealousy at his previous achievements or perhaps out of suspicion that in some areas of his ministry he had not been a strict traditionalist. In the Great Synagogue he was to show that the suspicion was correct.

Eventually Cohen gained the necessary rabbinical qualifications and on settling in Sydney in 1905 with his family he was the first and, for most of his ministry, the only minister in Sydney with semikhah. The Jewish population of Sydney was about 4,000, with about 700 regularly attending the Great Synagogue. Cohen was opposed to Zionism and, despite the origins of his own parents, to Jewish immigration from Eastern Europe. He early gave an indication of his stance by referring to "the extremes" of Orthodoxy and Reform, and stating his belief that his congregation stood "perhaps midway between the extremes". He was not opposed to the continuation of the mixed choir nor to the removal of the bimah from its central position to a place near the Ark to accommodate more seats. In 1907 he introduced the military Hanukkah service he had pioneered in Britain and which continued for several years.

During his nearly thirty years as Chief Minister of the Great Synagogue Cohen was active in all facets of Jewish life including being President of the New South Wales Board of Jewish Education, a founder of the New South Wales Jewish War Memorial and being involved in developing suburban synagogues. He worked for such philanthropic institutions as the Chevra Kadisha, the Sir Moses Montefiore Home for the aged and the local branch of the Anglo-Jewish Association; he was also involved in the Jewish Literary and Debating Society of Sydney. In 1928 he published the Jubilee History of the Great Synagogue, Sydney. He was an active Freemason.

Having grown up in Aldershot surrounded as a boy by the pomp and pageantry of mid-Victorian military life Cohen never lost his great love for the Army and patriotism for Empire and was described by Rabbi Raymond Apple as "the passionate patriot" and as "A tireless promoter of the model 'Anglo-Jewish gentleman', one proudly loyal to his ancestral religion yet fully and patriotically integrated into wider society..." He joined the Australian National Defence League and was appointed chaplain of the Australian Military Forces in 1909. During World War I he was vice-president of the Universal Service League and encouraged Jews to enlist in the Australian militias and strongly supported conscription. In 1929 he was awarded the Colonial Auxiliary Forces Officers' Decoration (VD).

Francis Lyon Cohen died of cancer in hospital at Potts Point in Sydney in 1934 aged 71 and was buried in Rookwood Cemetery, Rookwood, Sydney, New South Wales. His wife Rose, who had been very involved in the Jewish community in Sydney, died the same year. They were survived by a daughter, and by two sons who served overseas during the First World War with the Australian Imperial Force.

== Bibliography ==
- Jewish World, Oct. 15, 1897;
- Jewish Chronicle, Dec. 23, 1892;
- Jacobs, Jewish Year Book, 1899–1900.
