= Rotunda, Aldershot =

Former Primitive Methodist church in Aldershot, Hampshire, England

Coordinates: 51.247°N 0.756°W

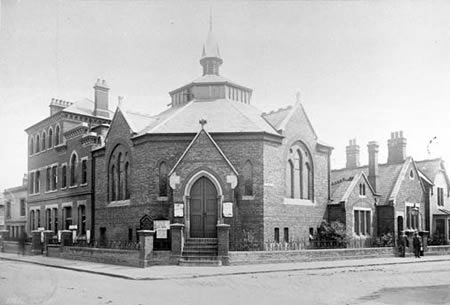
The former Rotunda Church in Aldershot in Hampshire in about 1891

The Rotunda was a Primitive Methodist church in Aldershot in Hampshire in the UK that was completed in 1876 and demolished in the 1980s. While the building took its name from the architectural form rotunda, it was in fact octagonal, and was notable as one of only 14 octagonal chapels built by the Methodists.

== Methodism in Aldershot ==
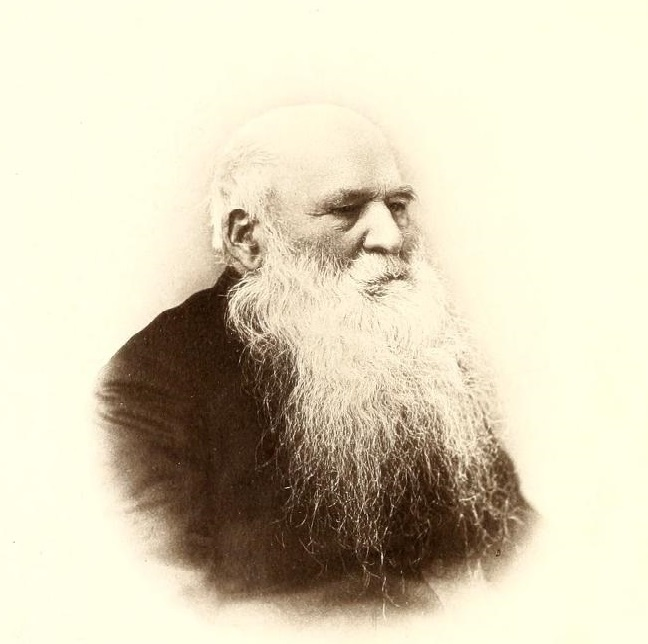
Rev Dr William Harris Rule, first Methodist minister at Aldershot (1856-1865)

The Rev Dr William Harris Rule came to Aldershot in 1856 to open Methodist work among the troops, remaining until 1865 and working in the town as a contemporary of missioner Mrs Louisa Daniell. The Wesleyan Connexion provided funding for the construction of an iron chapel on a site located in Church Street off Queens Road which was dedicated on 10 July 1857. Subsequently, a chaplain’s house and a Soldiers' Home were added. Methodism was not a recognised "religious denomination" in Army returns and there was great opposition from the local Anglican chaplains who found him an irritant but Dr Rule was supported by Lieut-General William Knollys and by 1862 Methodism was accepted under "Other Protestants" and so the work could continue unhindered.

The Primitive Methodists at that time were served by chapels in Victoria Road (the now demolished Rotunda building) and the Ebenezer Primitive Methodist chapel on Ash Road, built in 1885; while the Wesleyan Methodists were served by the Wesleyan church on Grosvenor Road completed in 1877.

== The Rotunda ==
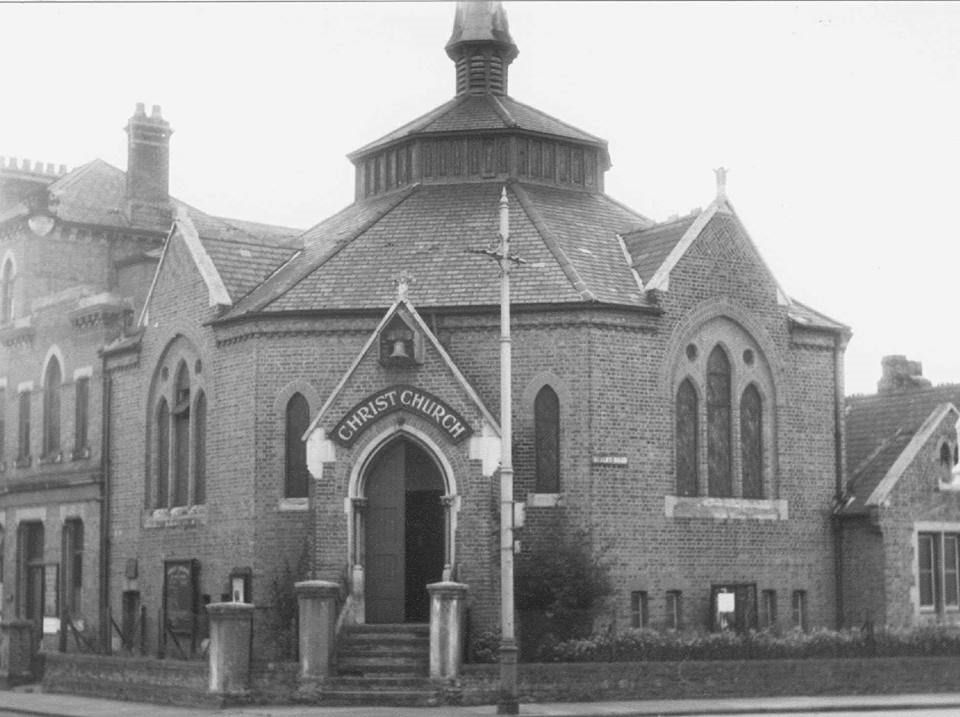
The Rotunda as Christ Church in 1958

Built with red brick and slate roof on the corner of Victoria Road and Albert Road for the Primitive Methodists in Aldershot, construction began in 1874 and completed in 1876. Built on land obtained from benefactor Richard Allden, a local contractor who supplied hay for army horses, the £16,500 for its construction was raised by voluntary subscription and donations. The architect was Farnham-based Thomas Wonnacott, who chose an octagonal design familiar to Methodists. The construction was undertaken by local builder George Kemp.

A report in the Primitive Methodist 1875-76 Yearly Report said:

"At Aldershot, the great military depot, we have built a schoolroom and house for the minister; the chapel is in course of erection. Several soldiers have been converted, among them, three young men, sons of ministers. Early in 1875 we opened our school room, which is now used as a temporary church."

The original church was named as 'The Primitive Methodist Church' and following the unification of Wesleyan and Primitive Methodism in the Methodist Union of 1932 it was sold to the Reformed Episcopal Church of England when it was renamed Christ Church.

The building was unique in its octagonal construction and in the number of commemorative plaques on its interior walls. Adjacent to the church was once the Christ Church Hall (originally the school room for the Methodist church) which had four foundation stones laid on 15 December 1874: one dedicated by William Terry; one by Mary Allden; a third by the scholars of the Methodist Sabbath School, while the fourth stone was defaced and the inscription illegible. The church building also had four foundation stones on its Victoria Road frontage which bore the date 22 March 1876. Inside the church were seven segments of seats while the eighth segment contained the dais or pulpit. This type of seating eliminated any precedence among the congregation.

== Demolition ==
The building was resold in 1962 and became flats, a driving centre and warehouse losing its Certificate as a Place of Worship in 1971 and was demolished in the 1980s despite efforts by local people to save it who pointed out its unique position in Methodist church design and Aldershot's social history. The church was demolished by George Kemp Stroud & Co Ltd, the successors to George Kemp who had built the church.

Today on the site stands the small Rotunda Industrial Estate.

== See also ==
- Wesleyan Church, Aldershot
