= Félix Torres =

Félix Torres may refer to:

- Félix Torres Amat (1772–1849), Spanish bishop
- Félix Torres (baseball) (1932–2025), Puerto Rican baseball player
- Félix Torres (footballer, born 1964), Paraguayan football striker
- Félix Torres (footballer, born 1997), Ecuadorian football defender
