= José Petisco =

Spanish Jesuit and Hellenist (1724–1800)

José Miguel Petisco (Ledesma, Salamanca, September 28, 1724 – ibid., January 27, 1800) was a Spanish Jesuit and Hellenist, known as one of the first Catholics to translate the entire Bible into Spanish, serving as a foundation for the Torres Amat Bible.

José Miguel Petisco joined the Society of Jesus on September 29, 1738, at the novitiate in Villagarcía de Campos (Valladolid). He was ordained as a priest in 1747 and taught Grammar for three years in Medina del Campo. He began teaching philosophy in Pamplona when, at the suggestion of Father Francisco Rábago, he traveled to the Jesuit college in Lyon on a scholarship from the Spanish government to specialize in Greek and Hebrew, or, as his friend the linguist Lorenzo Hervás y Panduro put it, “to specialize in all kinds of literature.” He stayed there from 1751 to 1754.

Afterward, he taught rhetoric and Greek and Hebrew at the Jesuit college in Villagarcía for six years, Controversies at the English College in Valladolid, and dogmatic theology and interpretation of Sacred Scripture at the Jesuit Royal College in Salamanca. For his theological work, he composed a Tractatus Theologicus, which remains unpublished in the library of the University of Salamanca. After completing his third probation, he made his fourth vow in Villagarcía on February 2, 1758. When the Jesuit order was expelled from Spain in 1767, he moved to Corsica for a year and then to Bologna, where he taught Sacred Scripture at the Fontanelli residence.

In September 1769, he visited the Bianchini residence with Francisco Javier de Idiáquez. In 1773, he composed a funerary tribute to Pedro Calatayud (Tafalla, 1689 – Bologna, 1773), a respected Jesuit missionary. After the suppression of the Jesuits by the pope in 1773, Petisco remained in Bologna. Influenced by the Italian translation of the Vulgate by Antonio Martini and new Spanish Inquisition directives of 1782, he began translating the Vulgate into Spanish in 1786. He returned to Spain with the nearly completed text in 1798, dying on January 27, 1800. His brother, Manuel Petisco (Ledesma, 1733–1800), also a Jesuit, died the same year.

Petisco also edited and commented on works by Cicero, published the Georgics and the Eclogues of Virgil, and authored a Greek Grammar. It is said that he translated the Commentaries of Julius Caesar, but this work was published under the name of José Goya y Muniain (Madrid, 1798). A similar controversy surrounds his Bible translation, which was published under the name of Félix Torres Amat. Scholars such as Antonio Astorgano Abajo have demonstrated that Torres Amat's Bible is substantially based on Petisco's work. The limited recognition given to Petisco's contributions has been attributed to rivalry between orders and Torres Amat's Jansenist leanings. According to Francisco Lafarga, Petisco also translated Esther by Jean Racine under the title La inocencia triunfante.
