= Torres Amat Bible =

1824 Catholic translation of the Bible

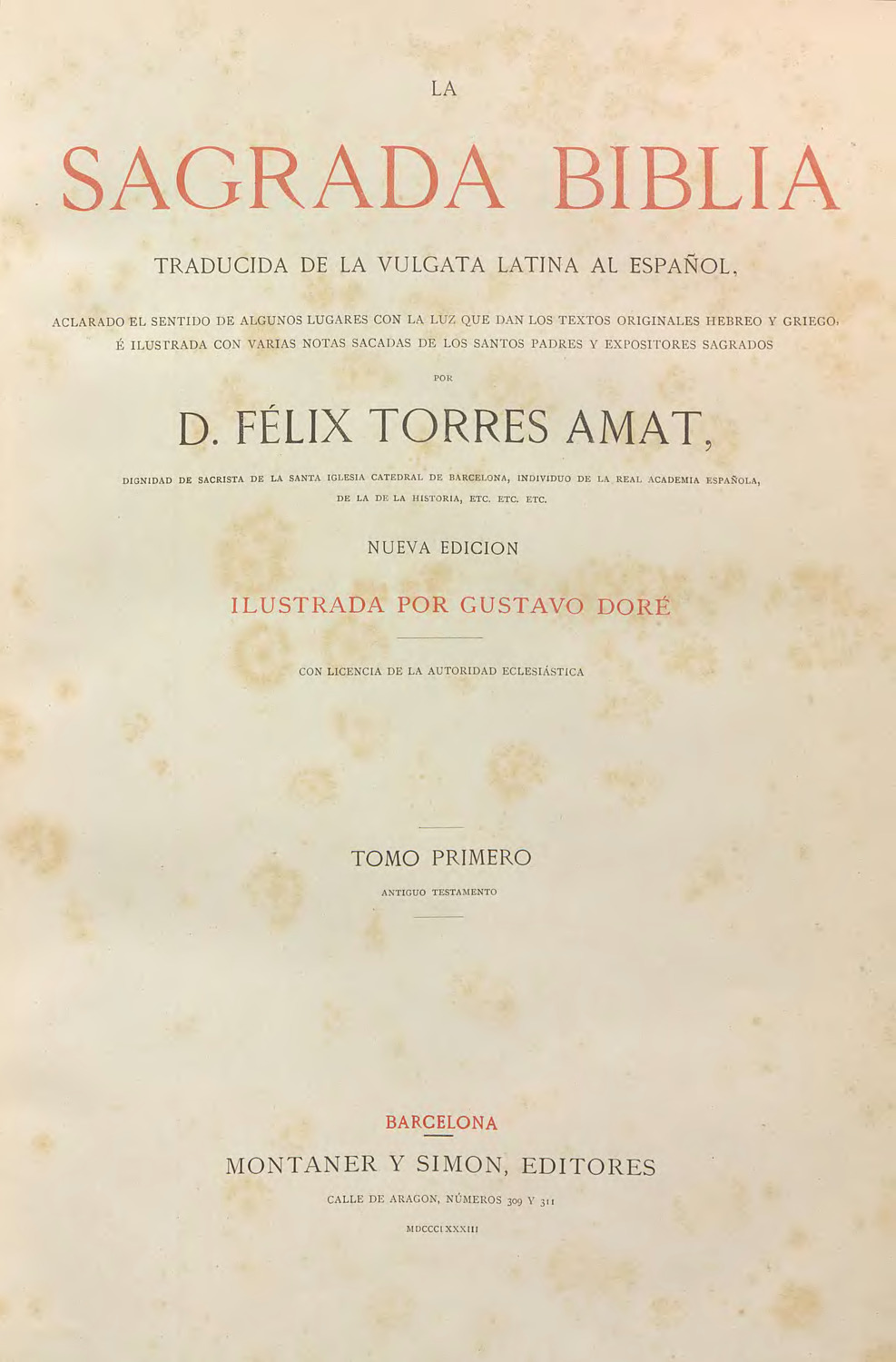
- Other names: Biblia Torres Amat Scío
- Abbreviation: BTA
- Language: Spanish
- Complete Bible published: 1823
- Textual basis: Used as the translation base Vulgate Hexapla; Used for comparison in footnotes Textus Receptus Masoretic Text
- Religious affiliation: Catholic Church

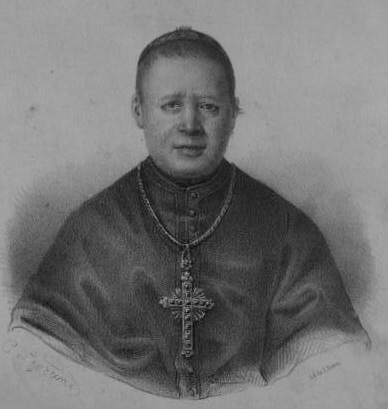
Félix Torres Amat, Bishop of Astorga and translator of the Bible

The Torres Amat Bible is a Catholic translation of the Bible by Félix Torres Amat published in 1823, translated directly from the Latin Vulgate version, with revisions referencing Greek and Hebrew texts. It was the first Catholic Bible translation into Spanish to achieve widespread distribution. It is also referred to as the Petisco-Torres Amat Bible.

== Personalities ==
Félix Torres Amat was the vicar general of Barcelona who was acting as bishop who was criticized for his regalism and perceived Jansenist tendencies. He was also a corresponding member of the Royal Academy of History and the Academy of Letters in Barcelona.

In 1823, he published his Bible translation, based on the work of José Miguel Petisco. Some editions added Petisco's name to the title.

== Commissioning ==
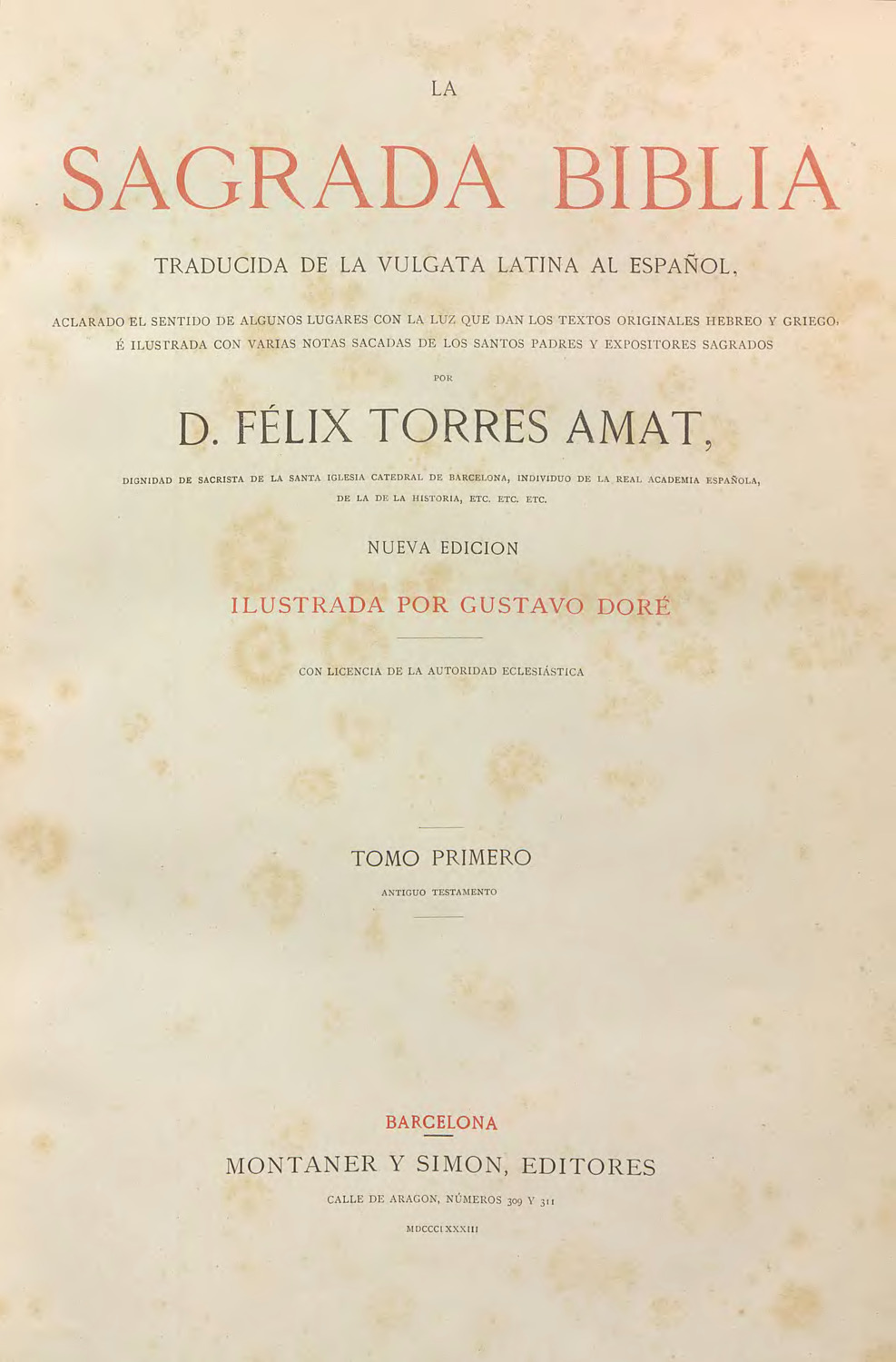
The Sagrada Biblia was illustrated by Gustave Doré

In 1824, he published a translation of the Bible in vernacular Spanish which had been entrusted to him by the Spanish kings Carlos IV and Fernando VII. This caused some criticism as both he and his father had become associated with Jansenism, and he had to retire to a monastery for some time.

Torres Amat's bible, known as the Torres Amat Bible, was published with illustrations by Gustave Doré.

In 1835 Torres Amat met William Harris Rule from Gibraltar as they both shared a common interest in distributing the Bible in people's first languages. Torres Amat had had difficulty publishing his translation, and he had relied on money from Anglicans in London.

== Translation of the Bible ==
Some characteristics of the Torres Amat Bible:

It was translated directly from the Latin Vulgate into Spanish, consulting Hebrew and Greek texts. The footnotes and introductions provide scholarly commentary, comparing the Vulgate with Hebrew and Greek sources. Paraphrased explanations, added by the translator, appear in italic text to clarify the meaning of the biblical passages. The name of God is rendered as "the Lord" following the tradition of the Vulgate (Dominus) and Septuagint (Kyrios). The Latinized form Jehovah appears in paraphrases, notes, and chapter summaries but only sparingly in the text—approximately 20 instances. The name Adonai appears five times.

== Revisions ==
Several grammatical revisions have been made to the text. The most notable was by Mons. Juan Straubinger, who updated the translation with reference to Hebrew and Greek texts. While this revision gained limited popularity outside Argentina, it received widespread praise from biblical scholars. Other revisions, such as those by P. Luis Robello CSSR, Felipe Ramos OSB, and Editorial Océano in Spain, made less substantial contributions.
