= Methodist Forces Board =

Methodist Forces Board (MFB) is the body of the Methodist Church of Great Britain that oversees the Church’s ministry to the British Armed Forces and the UK Community Cadet Forces, and promotes engagement with the Armed Forces Covenant. Building on a Methodist military chaplaincy tradition that dates back to the 19th century, the Church continues to send ordained ministers to serve as armed forces chaplains. In 1997, the Gibraltar Methodist Church moved from Forces Board oversight to become part of the London South West District, reflecting its wider community focus in Gibraltar. In recent years, the Board has reported to the annual Methodist Conference on its support for chaplains and related projects across the services.
