= William Rule =

William Rule may refer to:

- Sir William Rule (Surveyor of the Navy), British Surveyor of the Navy during the late 18th and early 19th centuries
- William Rule (editor) (1839–1928), newspaper publisher from Knoxville, Tennessee, United States
- William Harris Rule (1802–1890), British Methodist missionary and writer
