= Pedro de Calatayud =

Spanish Jesuit missionary

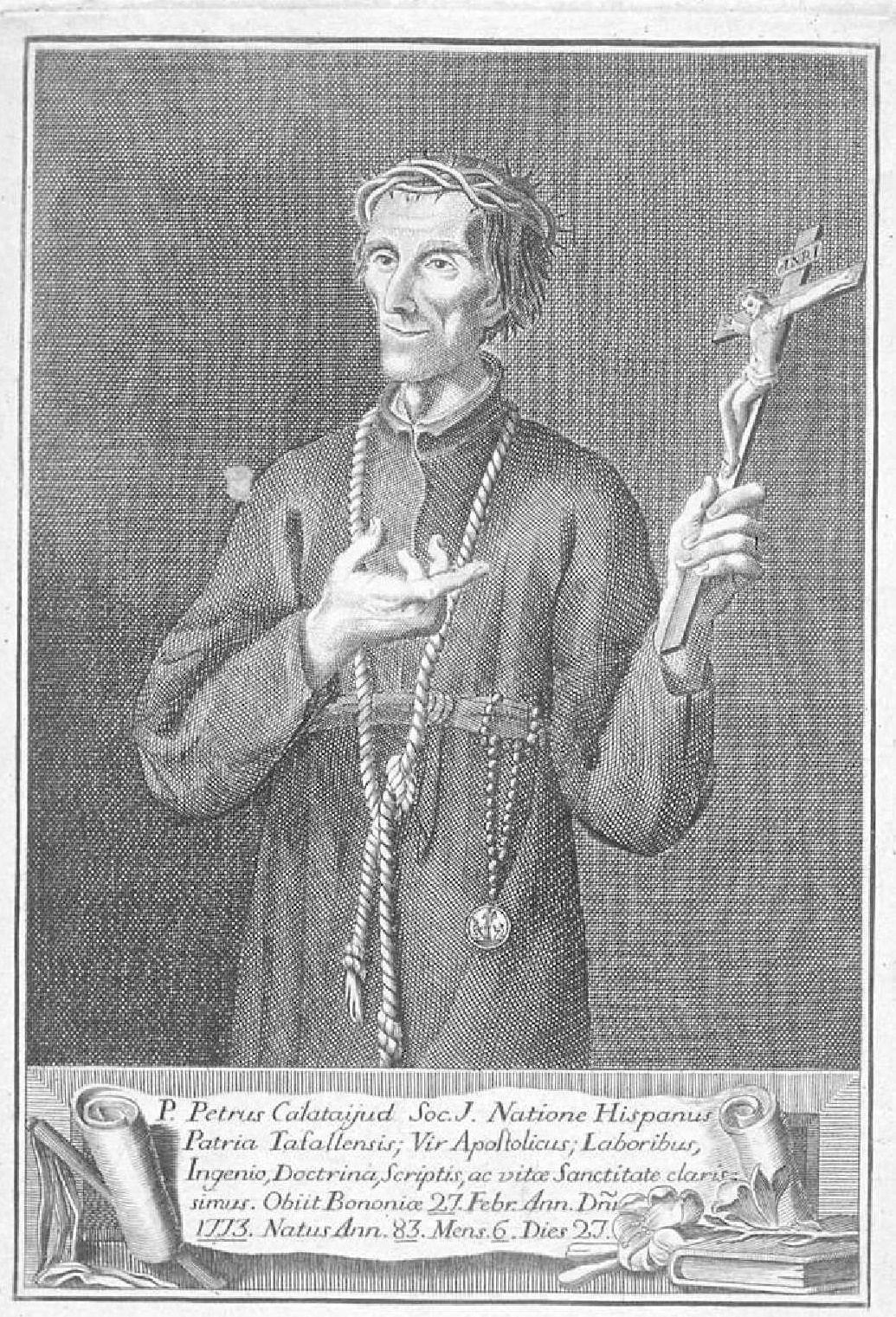
Anonymous engraving of Pedro de Calatayud

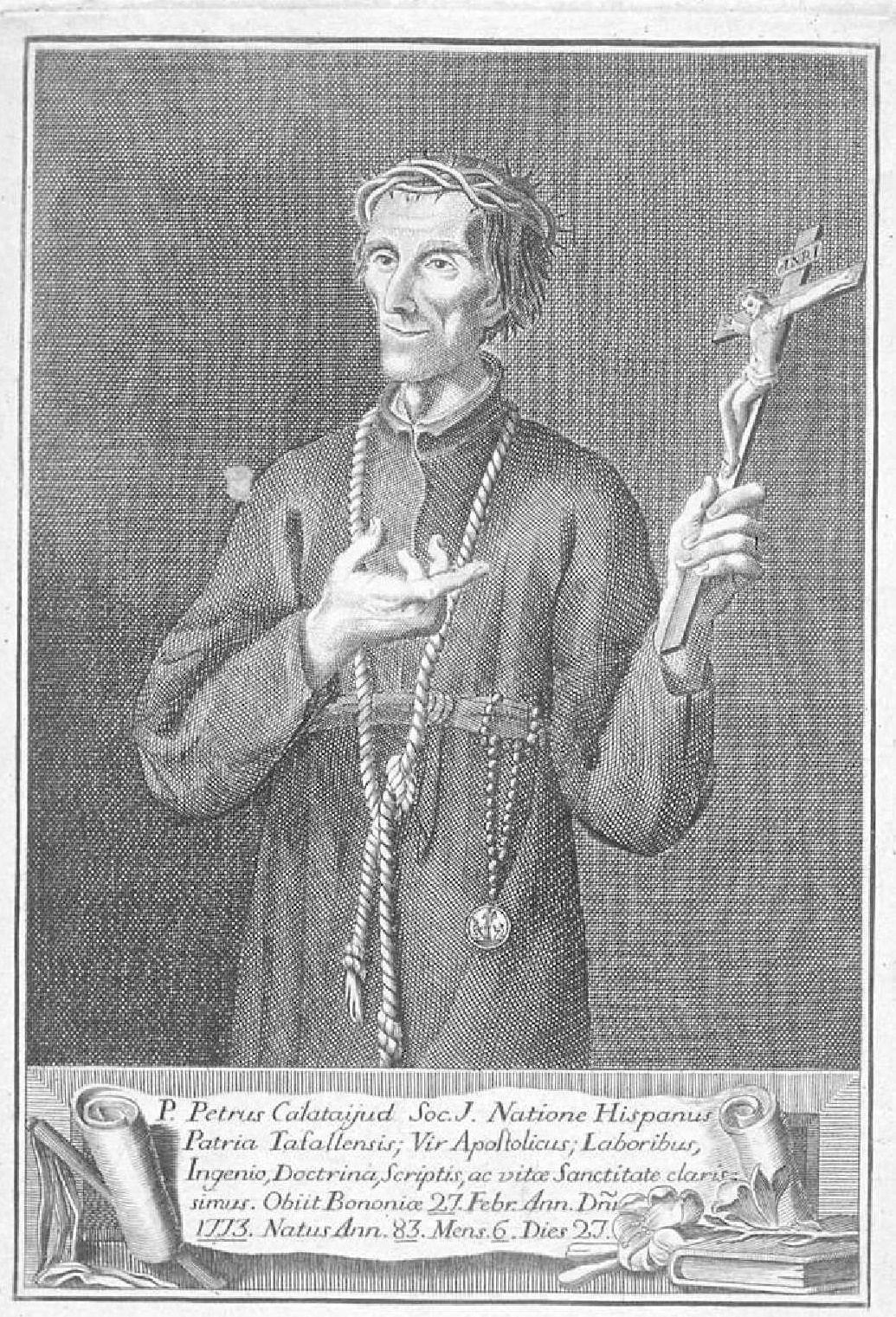
Pedro de Calatayud, anonymous engraving. Inscription: “P. Petrus Calatayud Soc. J. Natione Hispanus Patria Tafallensis Vir Apostolicus: Laboribus, Ingenio, Doctrina, Scriptis ac vitae Sanctitate clarissimus, Obiit Bononiae 27 Febr. Ann. Dni. 1773. Natus Ann. 83 Mens 6 Dies 27”. National Library of Spain.

Pedro de Calatayud SJ (Tafalla, August 1, 1689 – Bologna, February 27, 1773) was a Spanish preacher and writer of the Jesuit order.

== Biography ==
Pedro de Calatayud studied in Pamplona and at the universities of Alcalá and Salamanca. He taught rhetoric and philosophy at the Jesuit college in Medina del Campo and Sacred Scripture at the University of Valladolid (from 1725 to 1728). Beginning in 1733, he traveled extensively across Spain on missions, promoting devotion to the Sacred Heart of Jesus.

Regarding the technique used in his mission sermons, Calatayud explained:

In the discourse of my sermons, one proceeds gently, more by reasoning than by shouting, so that, as the quiet and gentle rain soaks into the earth, so the rain of disillusionment penetrates the soil of the heart; this is achieved with solid and natural motives, natural language, and expression. [...] However, in the final section of the sermon, threats, thunder, and judgments must be included, along with the effectiveness and spirit needed to correct vices and frighten the impious and those corrupted by their sins.

In his old age, at 77, he was forced to leave Spain due to the expulsion of the Jesuits in 1767.

Pedro de Calatayud was a prolific writer, with 39 published works and hundreds of manuscripts (114 or 295, depending on the source), many of which were sermons where he frequently reproduced texts from other authors.

He received praise from José Petisco and Benito Jerónimo Feijoo.

== Works ==
- Incendios de Amor Sagrado, y respiración amorosa de las almas devotas con el Corazón de Jesús su enamorado (Pamplona, 1735)
- Gemidos del corazón contrito y humillado (Pamplona, 1736)
- Juicio de los sacerdotes: doctrina práctica y anatomía de las conciencias (Pamplona, 1736)
- Cathecismo práctico para la instrucción de los fieles y uso alivio de párrocos y sacerdotes (Pamplona, 1749)
- Resumen de la vida y costumbres de el Excmo. Sr. Duque de Granada de Ega, Conde de Xavier, Marqués de Cortes, etc. (Pamplona, 1757)
- Sobre Sagradas Escrituras, Sentencias varias (Murcia, 1734)
- Missiones y sermones del P. Pedro Calatayud (Madrid, 1754; reproduction of the previous work)
- Compendio doctrinal muy útil para explicar y saber la doctrina christiana (Pamplona, 1731; translation and expansion of a work by Pietro Giacomo Bonomo)
- Opúsculos y doctrinas prácticas del P. Pedro de Calatayud (Logroño, 1754; expansion of previous works)
