= Wesleyan Church, Aldershot =

Church building in Aldershot, Hampshire, England

Coordinates: 51°14′55.04″N 0°46′3.17″W

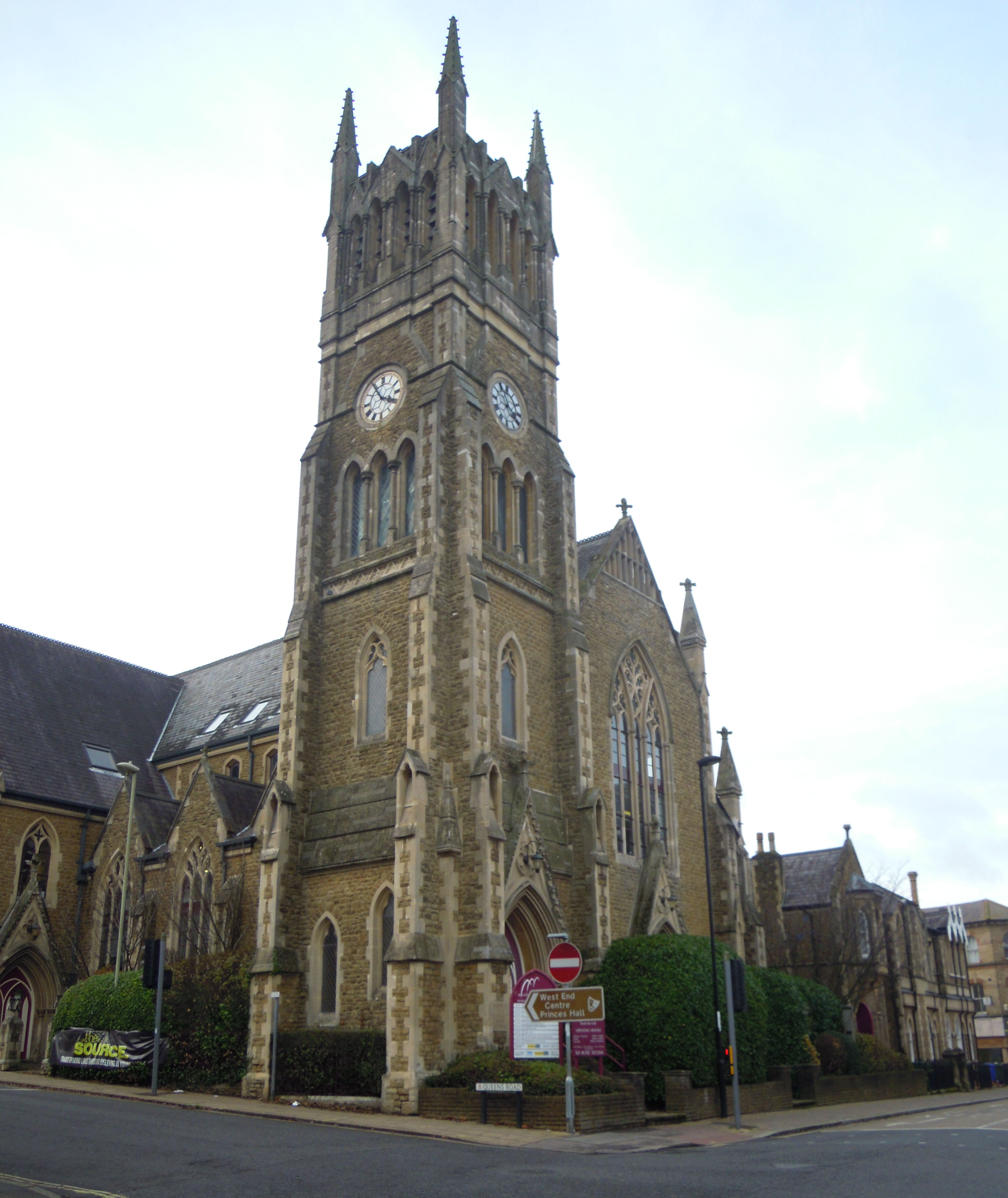
The Wesleyan Church in Aldershot in 2016

The Wesleyan Church is a former Methodist church for the town of Aldershot in Hampshire, England. Closed in 1988 the building has been a Grade II* listed building since 30 April 1981. In use today as offices, a dental studio and a gymnasium, the former Wesleyan Church is situated on the corner of Grosvenor Road and Queens Road in Aldershot.

== Early Methodism in Aldershot ==
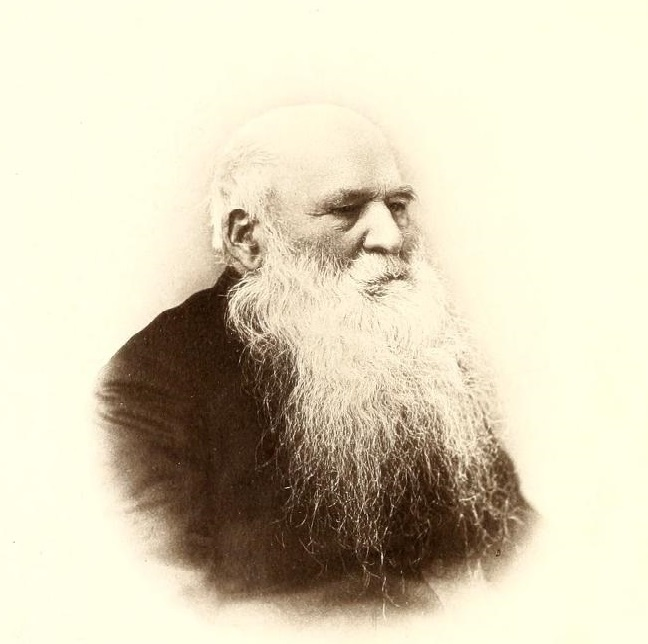
Rev Dr William Harris Rule, first Methodist minister at Aldershot (1856-1865)

The Rev Dr William Harris Rule came to Aldershot in 1856 to open Methodist work among the troops, remaining until 1865 and working in the town as a contemporary of missioner Mrs Louisa Daniell. The Wesleyan Connexion provided funding for the construction of an iron chapel on a site located in Church Street off Queens Road which was dedicated on 10 July 1857. Subsequently, a chaplain’s house and a Soldiers' Home were added. Methodism was not a recognised "religious denomination" in Army returns and there was great opposition from the local Anglican chaplains who found him an irritant but Dr Rule was supported by Lieut-General William Knollys and by 1862 Methodism was accepted under "Other Protestants" and so the work could continue unhindered. The Primitive Methodists at that time were served by chapels in Victoria Road (the now demolished Rotunda building built in 1876 and sold to the Reformed Episcopal Church of England in the mid 20th-century) and the Ebenezer Primitive Methodist chapel on Ash Road, built in 1885.

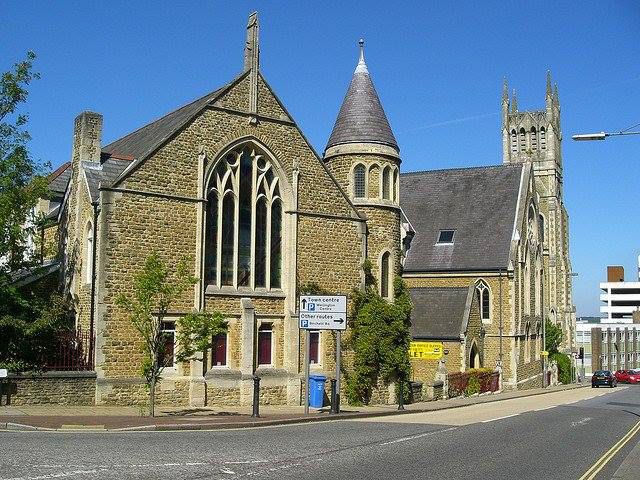
The rear complex of the former Wesleyan Church at Aldershot

However, boundary changes in the form of the high Wall around the south of the Camp isolated the Chapel which could now only be reached after a long walk and so the Rev Richard Watson Allen (1833-1914) secured a large site on the corner of Queens Road and Grosvenor Road in the centre of the developing town was within a few yards of the entrance to the barracks. Of this period it was later written:

"Mr Allen secured a large site in the centre of the town within two minutes’ walk of the main entrance into the Camp. Conference by formal vote gave him permission to appeal for and collect funds throughout the Connexion; and at once, with untiring energy and indomitable courage, he set to work. The result was that on one of the finest sites in Aldershot there was erected a magnificent church. Adjoining the church was built a Soldiers' Home, which at that date, was one of the best to be found in any command. This magnificent block of buildings--to it a Wesley Hall was later added by the civilian members of the congregation--is one of the finest in British Methodism, and stands today as a monument of the work done by Mr Allen during the years he was stationed at Aldershot."

Construction of the church building began in 1874 while the adjacent Soldiers' Home with lecture room, library, refreshment room and other accommodation was completed first and opened on 13 June 1875. The imposing Wesleyan Methodist Church on Grosvenor Road with its 100 foot tower was opened on 24 October 1877 with seating for 1,150 worshippers; the total cost of construction was £10,000.

== Design and features ==
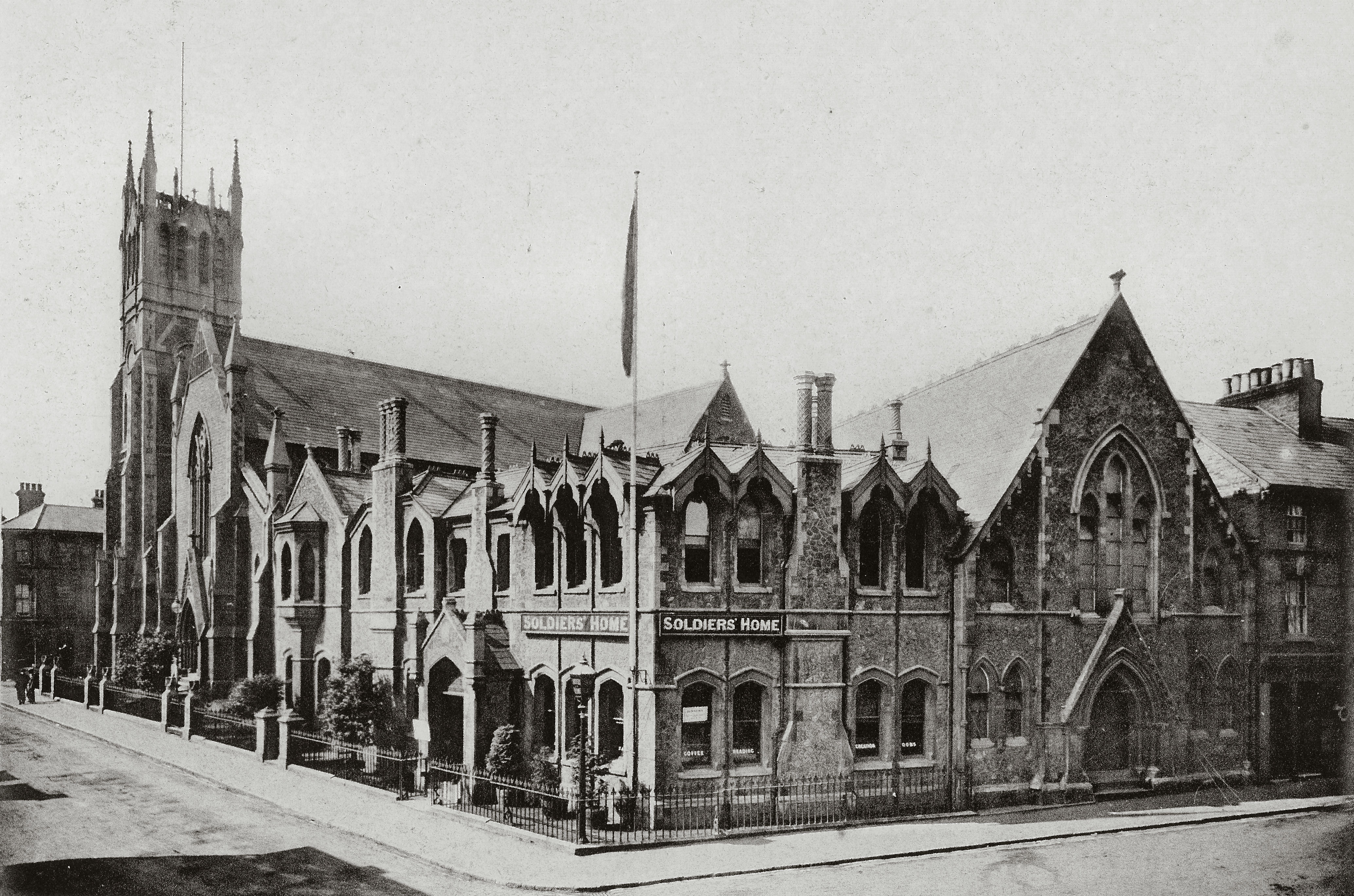
The Wesleyan Church and Soldiers' Home c1897

Built to the design of William Willmer Pocock with local sandstone rubble dressed with Bath stone and partly built with brick at the rear with slate roofs and crested ridge tiles, the nave was built with aisles, transepts, a chancel with a tower at the north-west corner. The design is Gothic Revival enhanced with Early English, Decorated and Perpendicular features. The main west window is Early English in style. The organ was installed in 1906 while the choir stalls and lectern were fitted after the Methodist Union of 1932 when the building had to accommodate a larger congregation after the smaller Primitive Methodist Rotunda chapel on Victoria Road in the town closed and its congregation moved to the Wesleyan buildings on Grosvenor Road and Ash Road.

The prominent tower, described as " the only significant tower in the town", is a local landmark and visible for miles. The tower clock was installed in 1922 in memory of the Rev. Edward Pearce Lowry (1843-1921), father of the English physical chemist Thomas Martin Lowry and Honorary Chaplain to the Forces of Aldershot Command from 1892 to 1919. The Rev Lowry is buried in Aldershot Military Cemetery.

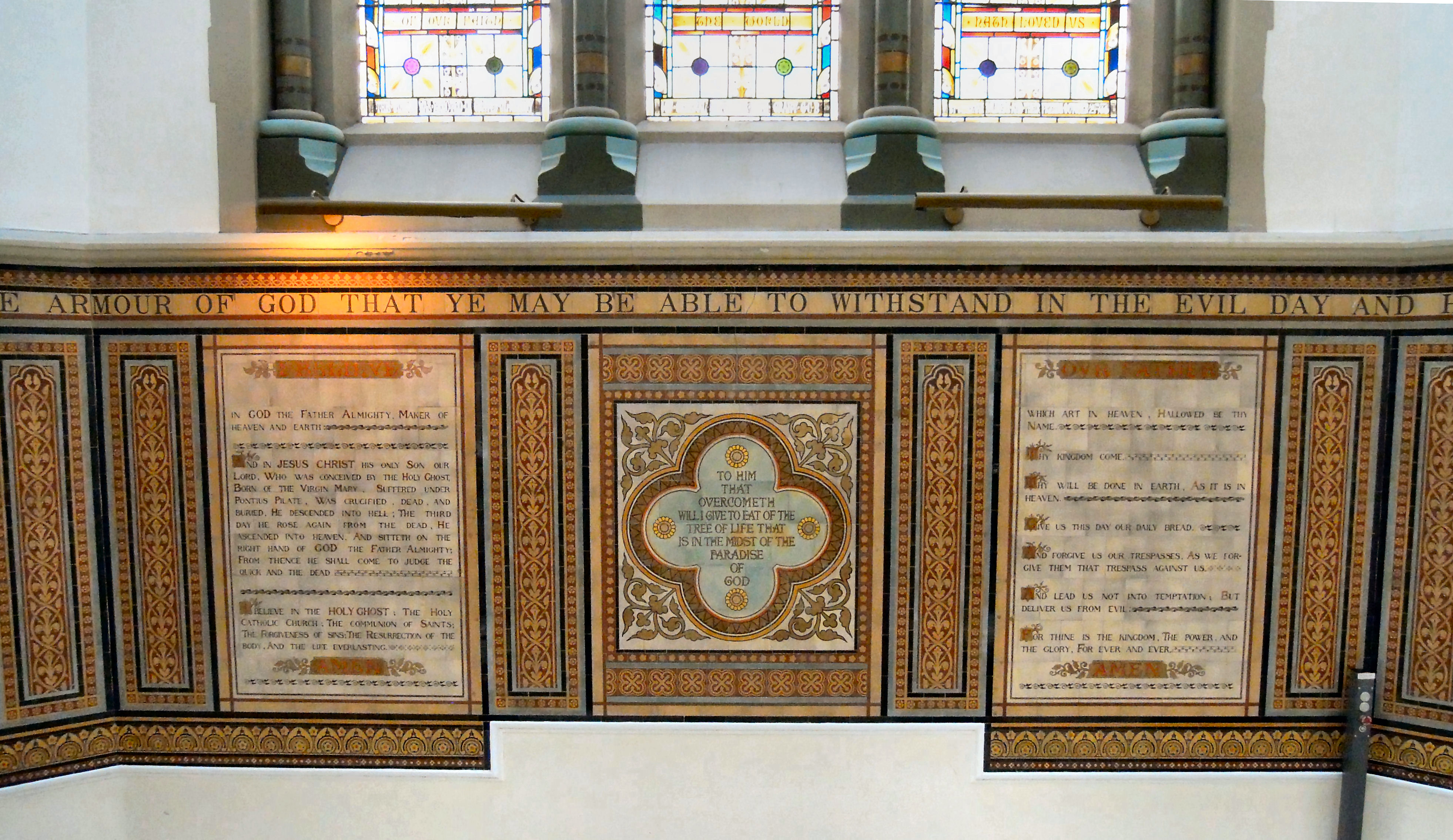
The reredos is dedicated to Frances Penelope Wharton Middleton

The nave is supported by columns of cast iron capped with Bath stone. The preserved reredos behind the now removed altar was created in mosaic and tiles and showed the Ten Commandments and the Lord's Prayer. The reredos is in memory of Frances Penelope Wharton Middleton, the daughter of Lieutenant-Colonel Lewis Watson who fought at the Battle of Waterloo in 1815 as a Major in the 69th Regiment. She is further commemorated on a brass plaque dated 1882 placed at the bottom of the reredos by her husband Richard Wharton Middleton of Leasingham Hall in Leasingham in Lincolnshire; he had also fought at Waterloo as an Ensign.

== The Methodist Union and after ==
The church with its Soldiers' Home and Hall served Methodist locals for over a hundred years while the support for servicemen provided by the Soldiers' Home was transferred to the Smith-Dorrien Home in 1925. When Wesleyan and Primitive Methodism united in the Methodist Union in 1932 the Methodist congregation in the town worshipped at the two Methodist churches on Grosvenor Road and the Ebenezer Primitive Methodist chapel on Ash Road until the closure of the latter in 1958 when it was sold as it no longer met the needs of the congregation. A plot of land opposite on the corner of Herrett Street and Stone Street was purchased and the stone-laying ceremony for a new all-purpose building took place on 26 April 1958. As it opened on to Stone Street that became its title. After the Grosvenor Road building was sold by the Aldershot Military Trust for £500,000 in 1988 the congregation joined other churches in the Methodist Circuit, some joining Stone Street when the name was changed to Aldershot Methodist Church. Subsequently changes were made to both the interior and exterior of the building to make it the functional building that it is today.

Since becoming redundant as a church in 1988 the Wesleyan Church on Grosvenor Road has been converted to a variety of uses including offices, a dental surgery and a gymnasium. The conversion was made by architects from the Farnham company of Ambergrange Ltd who won the Rushmoor Civic Design Award in 1992, commemorated in the stone behind the sign.
