= Manuel Matamoros =

Manuel Matamoros García
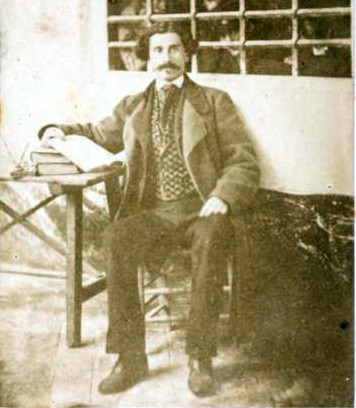
- Born: 1834; Lepe
- Died: 1866 (aged 31–32); Lausanne

Manuel Matamoros García (1834–1866) was a leading Spanish Protestant.

== Biography ==
Matamoros was born in Lepe in Huelva as the son of a lieutenant colonel in the Spanish Artillery and he was brought up at Málaga in Andulusia. He studied from 1850 to 1853 at the Military Academy in Toledo.

He became enthusiastic about Protestantism following figures such as Francisco de Paula Ruet and Antonio Vallespinosa and he is said to have been converted in Gibraltar. In a strict Catholic country he was sentenced in Granada to eight years and banned from being a teacher. The sentence was not for being a Protestant but for spreading propaganda that encouraged others (proselitism). Eleven others were acquitted whilst his co-defendant José Alhama Teva was given nine years. Matamoros and Teva's sentences were eventually commuted to exile. In May 1863 they were attending the Gibraltar Methodist Church.

Matamoros went to France and finally died in Switzerland. He has been described as the founder of Spanish Protestantism and a symbol of religious freedom. Matamoros died in Lausanne.

== Legacy ==
Matamoros left behind an extensive collection of Carte de Visite for Protestants he had met in Lausanne, Gibraltar and elsewhere. These provide an insight into who he knew. For instance there is a card for Rev. William Harris Rule, a Methodist minister who had tried unsuccessfully to introduce Protestantism into Spain twenty years before Matamoros.
