= Gibraltar Methodist Church =

- Wesley House
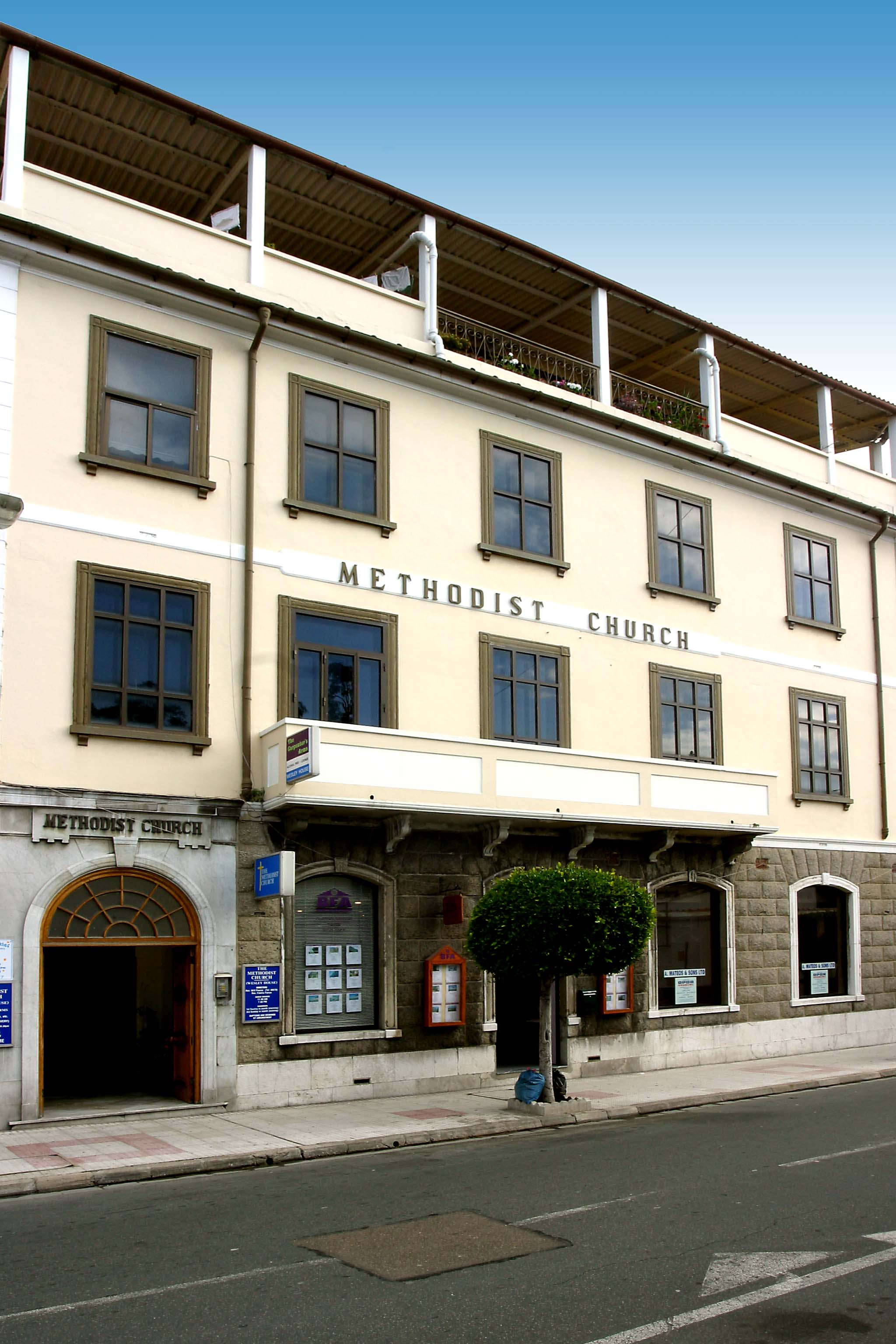
- Wesley House
- Gibraltar Methodist Church
- 36.136654°N 5.35305°W
- Location: 297 Main Street
- Country: Gibraltar
- Denomination: Methodism
- Website: Gibraltar Methodist

History
- Founded: 1933

Administration
- Diocese: Methodist Church of Great Britain

The Gibraltar Methodist Church is part of the South East District of the Methodist Church of Great Britain. It has a long history associated with the development of British Gibraltar, and it has greatly strengthened its ties with the local population since the scaling down of Britain-based forces in recent years. In 2006 it appointed Fidel Patron - the first Gibraltarian Superintendent Minister.

== History ==
Methodism in Gibraltar began in 1769 with a group of soldiers, the best known of which was Sergeant-major Henry Ince, who was himself a Methodist lay preacher. Ince became famous in Gibraltar through his work in the Upper Galleries or "Great Siege Tunnels" as they are known today. There is a legend that it was Ince's home in Prince Edward's Road that provided the first meeting place for Methodists, but there is no evidence to support that claim.

The first Methodist Church was built in 1809 in Prince Edward's Road and later a school and Manse were added. As Methodism grew the work spread into the Southern part of Spain where Churches and schools were established.

During the 1830s there was a sudden increase in Methodist education in Gibraltar. William Harris Rule who was a Methodist missionary and his wife had been allowed to start schools for the children of the forces and the following year he had a reasonable number of pupils. These new schools were very popular particularly with the better off who wanted to avoid the poor quality education supplied by public subscription. The whole matter came to a head on the centenary of the Wesleyan Foundation in 1839 when Gibraltarians were surprised to see 400 local school children marching down Main Street carrying banners. It was apparent that Rule was training missionaries and this was the start of the end of his Methodist academies.

The Reverend Rule and his family left Gibraltar after he bought a property without getting approval from the Missionary Society and after trying to start a Methodist mission in Algeciras against the specific instructions of the society. Methodist schooling in Gibraltar continued until the 1890s.

In 1863 the church became involved with Spaniards who had to leave their country because they were spreading Protestant propaganda. Manuel Matamoros, José Alhama and Miguel Trigo were sentenced in Granada and were amongst these exiles. Matamoros was eventually exiled from Spain and died in Switzerland although he was to be known as the start of Spanish Protestantism.

Always linked with work among service personnel, that work became focussed in the establishment of a recreation club in part of the school, and in 1898 a 'Welcome' home for soldiers and sailors was opened at No.6 Church Street, the site of the old Eastern Telegraph offices. The 'Welcome' moved to the present site at 297 Main Street in 1933. Through the Church and its ministry of worship and service thousands of people of all faiths and none were welcomed and cared for over these years of increasing outreach and growth.

The Church moved to its present location in 1956 when the old Church and Manse were sold. The building was reconstructed into its present shape and was renamed Wesley House. From here the Church has become the spiritual home not only of Methodists but of Christians from many backgrounds who live and work in and around Gibraltar.

In 1997 the Church in Gibraltar became part of the then London South West District of the Methodist Church of Great Britain and ceased to come under the orbit of the Forces Board. This move recognized that, while the link with the forces remained, the work of the Church was now very much focussed towards the whole community of Gibraltar and its surrounding area.

In 2006 it appointed Fidel Patron - the first Gibraltarian Superintendent Minister.

Following the resignation of Fidel Patron, Conrad Hicks was appointed in succession as Superintendent Minister.
