= Félix Torres Amat =

18-19th-century translator of the Bible into Spanish

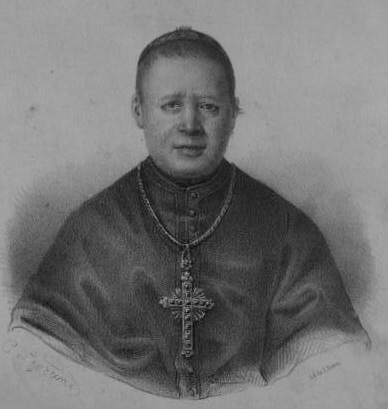
- Born: 6 August 1772; Sallent de Llobregat, Spain
- Died: 29 December 1847 (aged 75); Madrid, Spain
- Known for: First Spanish translation of the bible

Seat T of the Real Academia Española
- In office 1847 – 29 December 1847
- Preceded by: Demetrio Ortiz
- Succeeded by: Jaime Balmes (Note: Balmes was elected for the position in 1848 but never took the seat)

Félix Torres Amat or Félix Torres i Amat de Palou (6 August 1772 – 29 December 1849) was a Spanish Bishop. He translated the Bible into vernacular Spanish and published a record of leading authors in Catalan.

== Life ==
Torres Amat, born in Sallent de Llobregat in 1772, was the son of Joseph Torres and Teresa Amat. Félix Torres Amat began his education in Humanities in his hometown and, in 1786, moved to Tarragona to study Philosophy and Theology at the literary academy associated with the University of Cervera, earning a doctorate in 1794. That same year, he became a professor of Philosophy in Tarragona and introduced Mathematics, a discipline he greatly favored. Two years later, he was appointed rector of the seminary in Tarragona. In 1802, he began teaching Sacred Scripture but soon left teaching when, in 1805, he was appointed a canon in the royal collegiate church of San Ildefonso by his uncle Félix Amat, archbishop of Palmyra.

After the collegiate church was dissolved on June 15, 1810, Torres Amat moved to Madrid, where he taught Rhetoric, Philosophy, and Mathematics at the Royal Studies of San Isidro for two years. Following the French occupation, he returned to Catalonia with his uncle, was named senior sacristan of the Barcelona Cathedral, and gained prominence as a preacher. On April 17, 1817, he delivered a sermon on peace in the cathedral, showcasing his conciliatory spirit. On January 21, 1819, he gave a funeral oration for Queen Maria Isabel of Braganza, praising the monarchy without exaggerating the sacredness of royal absolutism.

In 1816, he was admitted as a corresponding member of the Royal Academy of History and the Academy of Letters in Barcelona. During the proclamation of the liberal Constitution in 1820, he was called to be part of a provisional council to oversee local governance. His moderate political stance led to his appointment as a censor for the province of Catalonia.

When Bishop Pablo de Sichar resigned as Bishop of Barcelona in 1820, Torres Amat was chosen to manage the diocese, although he only accepted the position as vicar general since Sichar remained the legitimate bishop. Criticized by the nuncio Giustiniani for his regalism and perceived Jansenist tendencies due to his defense of his uncle Félix Amat’s works—placed on the Index of Forbidden Books—Torres Amat dedicated himself to study.

== New Bible ==
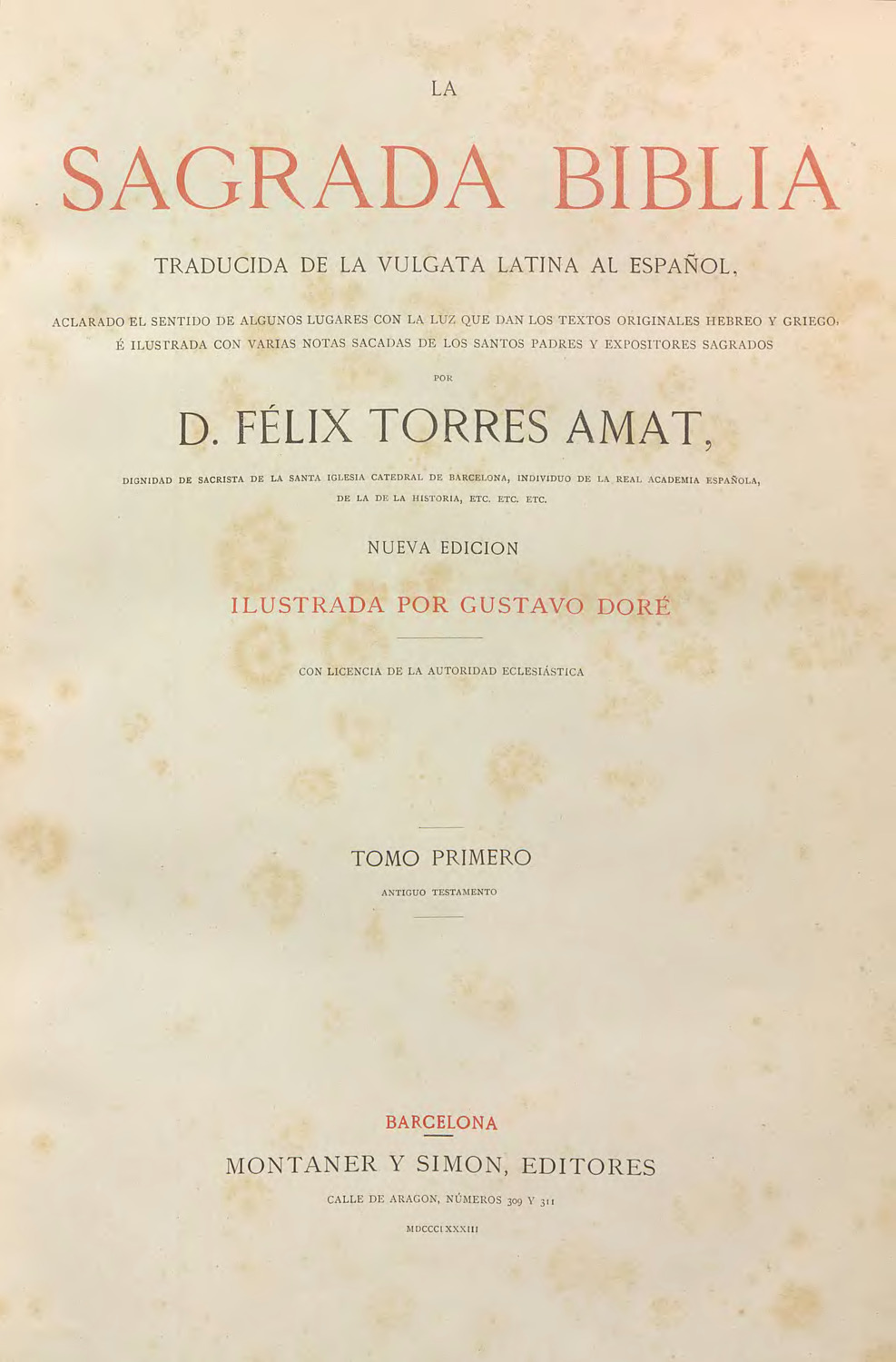
The Sagrada Biblia was illustrated by Gustave Doré

In 1824, he published a translation of the Bible in vernacular Spanish which had been entrusted to him by the Spanish kings Carlos IV and Fernando VII. This caused some criticism as both he and his father had become associated with Jansenism, and he had to retire to a monastery for some time. On May 1, 1834 he was ordained as the Bishop of Astorga, and in the following year, he met William Harris Rule from Gibraltar as they both shared a common interest in distributing the Bible in people's first languages. Torres Amat had had difficulty publishing his translation, and he had relied on money from Anglicans in London.

Torres Amat was elected to the prestigious Real Academia Española where he briefly held the T Seat. Torres Amat's bible, known as the Torres Amat Bible, was published with illustrations by Gustave Doré.

Apart from the translation of the Bible, his best-known work is Reports to help form a critical dictionary of Catalan writers and give some idea of the ancient and modern literature of Catalonia. This was based on the work of his brother who had been a leading librarian in Barcelona and he had started to record notable Catalan authors.

Torres Amat died in Madrid on December 29, 1847.

== Works ==
- Treaty of the Church of Jesus Christ, Madrid, 1793–1805.
- Succinct account of the funeral honors ... Maria Isabel Francisca de Braganza. Barcelona, 1819.
- Art of living in peace, Barcelona, 1821.
- The happiness of Christian death, 1832.
- Life of the Hon. Mr. D. Felix Amat, Madrid, 1835, with an appendix, Madrid, 1838.
- Reports to help form a critical dictionary of Catalan writers and give some idea of the ancient and modern literature of Catalonia, Barcelona, 1836.
- Pastoral, Madrid, 1838.
- Advantages of a good Christian, Astorga, 1839.
- Catholic Apology ... Observations of the Archbishop of Palmyra peaceful, Madrid, 1843.
- Translation of the Bible into Spanish, 1823.
