= William Harris Rule =

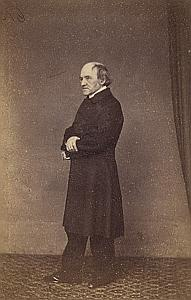
- A Carte de Visite card given to Manuel Matamoros
- Born: 15 November 1802; Penryn, Cornwall
- Died: 25 September 1890 (aged 87); Addiscombe
- Known for: Methodism in Gibraltar
- Spouse: Mary Ann Dunmill

William Harris Rule (born 15 November 1802 – 1890) was a British Methodist missionary and writer. Rule and his wife started schools building to 400 pupils in Gibraltar. He tried to establish missions in Spain.

== Life ==
Rule was born in Penryn in Cornwall to John Rule, who was an army surgeon, and Louise, his wife (born Harris). Rule did not get on with his family and left to work as an artist at the age of seventeen. Rule was converted to Methodism at the age of twenty and moved from the career of artist to schoolmaster. He decided he wanted to become a missionary, and he started studying Latin and Greek. In 1825 he was summoned to London to await a missionary position, and early in 1826 he married Mary Ann Dunmill. In March they were sent to Malta to train for a mission in Palestine. However, war broke out and they were redirected to Gibraltar.

Rule arrived in Gibraltar in 1832 although he had briefly visited before, where he had made a favourable impression on the church there. Rule was of the belief that he was in charge and that lay volunteers were welcome to assist, but it was Rules's role to make decisions. This led to some friction and resignations, but Rule appears to have been unrepentant.

The start of free schools can be assigned to Mary Ann Rule. They had both learnt Spanish, and Mary was asked informally to teach a neighbour's child to read. Her first student was joined by her brother and then other Catholics and then Jewish children. Rule was obliged to get himself involved. Rule noted that he (sic) became unawares the "founder of the first charity school in the garrison". The Jews eventually withdrew on religious grounds, and Rule was involved when Lieutenant Governor William Houston set up the first official free school on Flat Bastion Road in 1832 and he sent his own children there.

The new school was secular although it was led by a committee which included the major religious leaders, but not Rule. The following year Rule announced that he would reform his school and it would not only include religious instruction for girls and boys but students would be required to attend the Methodist church on a Sunday. The school thrived, and he took on assistants, and in 1835 he appointed William Lyon to be master of the school. This allowed him and Lyon to start up another Sunday School targeted at Spanish children. Rule was also interested in the families, and he would survey the population so that he could distribute Bibles translated into Spanish, Portuguese and Italian. He had few refusals. The Catholic population realised that they needed to establish their own school, and in 1835 two Irish Brothers arrived to found the Christian Brothers School. However, progress was slow as the children did not speak English and the new teachers did not speak Spanish. The brothers were overworked and nearly left when they realised that they were not expected to take a holiday.

In 1835 Rule journeyed around Spain speaking to like-minded people about distributing the Bible. Amongst others he twice met Félix Torres Amat, who was the Bishop of Astorga who had translated the Bible into Spanish in 1824, but had had difficulty finding money for publication. Rule reported that he found Amat's liberal views interesting, but when he read his works he found that he was expressing much more conservative views. Rule decided that he wanted to create his own translation of the gospels into Spanish. He completed this in 1841, and these were printed together with hymn books, school books and other religious works.

Rule's new schools were very popular, particularly with the better off, who wanted to avoid the poor-quality education supplied by public subscription. The whole matter came to a head on the centenary of the Wesleyan Foundation in 1839 when Gibraltarians were surprised to see 400 of Rule's local school children marching down Main Street carrying banners that showed that they were committing to the Methodist approach. It was apparent that Rule was training converts and missionaries. This was the start of the end of his Methodist academies.

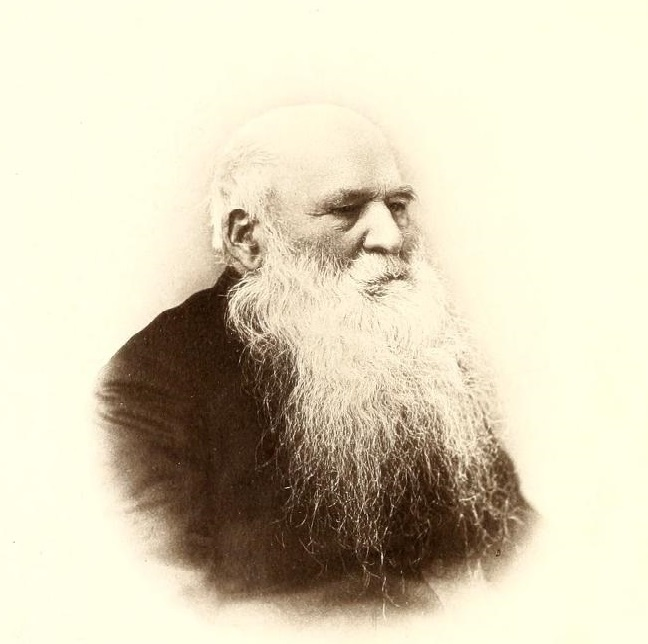
Photograph from Rule's autobiography

Rule came into a disagreement with the governor when a soldier was disciplined for his Methodism, which Rule felt was against standing orders. He appealed directly to London and won a small victory, but the garrison prevented the support he had received from volunteers, and he no longer enjoyed the support he once had. Rule's obsession was Spain, and he concentrated on teaching in Spanish whilst trying to establish missions in Cadiz, Madrid and eventually Algeciras. The latter was done against the specific advice from the Missionary society who funded his work that he should conduct any work over the border. Advocating Protestantism and supplying Bibles was against Spanish law, but Rule seemed to ignore this.

Matters came to a head after Rule had been requested to economise and it emerged that he had committed to purchase a property in the south of Gibraltar without prior approval. Moreover, Rule had purchased the property in his own name and had not revealed the full details of the contract. Rule offered his resignation, and it was accepted, with the Missionary Society noting later that he was fortunate to escape so lightly.

Rule worked as a Methodist minister at the first Wesleyan chapel in Aldershot and in Plymouth before retiring in 1872. He still visited Gibraltar, but he never travelled outside the UK again in an official capacity. There is a carte de visite from Rule in the collection of Manuel Matamoros and he has been called the founder of Protestantism in Spain. His wife died in February 1872, and it was she who actually started the first charity school. Rule married again in 1873, and he extended his earlier translation of the gospels to include the whole of the New Testament, and this was published by the Missionary Society in 1880. Rule died on 25 September 1890 in Addiscombe, near Croydon, Surrey.

== Reform of religious exclusivity in the British Army ==
For most of the first half of the 19th century, with some exception in Scottish and Irish regiments, the British Army recognised the Church of England's religious observances, exclusive of other Christian churches. William Rule played an important role in bringing Wesleyan Methodism observances to soldiers who professed Wesleyan Methodism.
