= List of Hampshire County Cricket Club players =

This article contains a list in alphabetical order of cricketers who have played for Hampshire County Cricket Club in top-class matches since it was founded in 1863. The county club is classified as an important team by substantial sources from its first match in 1864 until 1885; classified as an official first-class team from 1895 by Marylebone Cricket Club (MCC) and the County Championship clubs; classified as a List A team since the beginning of limited overs cricket in 1963; and classified as a first-class Twenty20 team since the inauguration of the Twenty20 Cup in 2003.

The details are the player's usual name followed by the years in which he was active as a Hampshire player. Note that many players represented other top-class teams besides Hampshire. Current players are shown as active to the latest season in which they played for the club. The list excludes Second XI and other players who did not play for the club's first team; and players whose first team appearances were in minor matches only. Players who represented the county before 1864 are included if they also played for the county club but excluded if not.

For more detailed information about the Hampshire players in each of the three main forms of top-class cricket, see the following:

- List of Hampshire County Cricket Club first-class players
- List of Hampshire County Cricket Club List A players
- List of Hampshire County Cricket Club Twenty20 players

As of 21 July 2026

== A ==
- Aaqib Javed (1991): Aaqib Javid
- Kyle Abbott (2014–2026): KJ Abbott
- Abdul Razzaq (2010): Abdul Razzaq
- Anthony Abdy (1881): AJ Abdy
- Cecil Abercrombie (1913): CH Abercrombie
- James Acton (1880–1882): J Acton
- Andre Adams (2015): AR Adams
- Geoffrey Adams (1928–1930): GCA Adams
- Jimmy Adams (2002–2018): JHK Adams
- Ronnie Aird (1920–1939): R Aird
- Robert Airey (1911): RB Airey
- Basil Akram (2014): BMR Akram
- Toby Albert (2021–2026): TE Albert
- Kabir Ali (2010–2012/13): Kabir Ali
- Cecil Allenby (1900): MC Allenby
- Tom Alsop (2014–2021): TP Alsop
- Harry Altham (1919–1923): HS Altham
- Gareth Andrew (2016): GM Andrew
- Steve Andrew (1984–1989): SJW Andrew
- William Andrew (1897–1898): W Andrew
- Arthur Andrews (1880–1885): AJ Andrews
- Clifford Andrews (1938–1948): CJ Andrews
- Francis Arkwright (1923): FGB Arkwright
- Edward Armitage (1919–1925): EL Armitage
- H. H. Armstrong (1882–1885): HH Armstrong
- Alban Arnold (1912–1914): ACP Arnold
- John Arnold (1929–1950): J Arnold
- Jon Ayling (1987–1993): JR Ayling
- Adrian Aymes (1987–2002): AN Aymes

== B ==
- Francis Bacon (1895–1911): FH Bacon
- John Badcock (1906–1908): J Badcock
- George Bailey (2013–2017): GJ Bailey
- Jim Bailey (1927–1952): J Bailey
- Michael Bailey (1979–1982): MJ Bailey
- W. P. Bailey (1864): WP Bailey (Note: Bailey made one first class appearance for Hampshire in 1864, scoring fourteen runs in two innings, with a high score of ten runs.)
- Sonny Baker (2024/25–2026): S Baker
- Paul-Jan Bakker (1986–1992): PJ Bakker
- David Balcombe (2006–2014): DJ Balcombe
- William Baldock (1877–1882): WS Baldock
- Dennis Baldry (1959–1963): DO Baldry
- Harry Baldwin (1877–1905): H Baldwin
- Tom Barber (2014): TE Barber
- Giles Baring (1930–1939): AEG Baring
- Keith Barker (2019–2025): KHD Barker
- Mike Barnard (1952–1966): HM Barnard
- Edward Barrett (1885): E Barrett
- Edward Barrett (1896–1925): EIM Barrett
- Peter Barrett (1975–1976): P Barrett
- Edward Bartley (1931): ELD Barley
- Charles Barton (1895–1896): CG Barton
- Harold Barton (1910–1912): HGM Barton
- Victor Barton (1895–1902): VA Barton
- Richard Bateman (1883): R Bateman
- Frederick Bates (1920): FS Bates
- Michael Bates (2010–2014): MD Bates
- Sydney Beadle (1911): SW Beadle
- Henry Bedford (1882): H Bedford
- Gordon Belcher (1905): G Belcher
- Russell Bencraft (1876–1896): HWR Bencraft
- Chris Benham (2004–2010): CC Benham
- Winston Benjamin (1994–1996): WKM Benjamin
- Richard Bennett (1896–1899): RA Bennett
- Bernhard Bentinck (1900–1902): BW Bentick
- Gareth Berg (2015–2019): GK Berg
- Tino Best (2016): TL Best
- Henry Bethune (1885–1897): HB Bethune
- Andy Bichel (2005): AJ Bichel
- Guy Bignell (1904–1925): GN Bignell
- Hugh Bignell (1901–1902): HG Bignell
- Jackson Bird (2015): JM Bird
- Percy Bird (1900): PJ Bird
- Lawrence Black (1903–1919): LG Black
- David Blake (1949–1958): DE Blake
- John Blake (1937–1939): JP Blake
- Frederick Blundell (1880): FJ Blundell
- Cecil Bodington (1901–1902): CH Bodington
- Robert Bolton (1913–1922): RHD Bolton
- Shane Bond (2008): SE Bond
- Lothian Bonham-Carter (1880–1885): LG Bonham-Carter
- Clement Booth (1875–1880): C Booth
- Liam Botham (1996): LJ Botham
- James Bovill (1993–1997): JNB Bovill
- Alex Bowell (1902–1927): HAW Bowell
- Norman Bowell (1924): NH Bowell
- Edward Bowen (1864): EE Bowen
- Joseph Bower (1897–1898): J Bower
- Stuart Boyes (1921–1939): GS Boyes
- Sir Evelyn Bradford, 2nd Baronet (1895–1905): ER Bradford
- Ruel Brathwaite (2013–2014): RMR Brathwaite
- Dewald Brevis (2025): DT Brevis
- John Bridger (1946–1954): JR Bridger
- Charles Briggs (1900): CE Briggs
- Danny Briggs (2009–2024/25): DR Briggs
- Bernard Brodhurst (1897): BML Brodhurst
- Dallas Brooks (1919–1921): RAD Brooks
- Ben Brown (2022–2026): BC Brown
- George Brown (1908–1933): G Brown
- Michael Brown (2004–2008): MJ Brown
- James Bruce (2003–2007): JTA Bruce
- Iain Brunnschweiler (2000–2003): I Brunnschweiler
- Charles Brutton (1921–1930): CP Brutton
- Septimus Brutton (1904): S Brutton
- Bill Buck (1969): WD Buck
- Edward Buckland (1895): EH Buckland
- Lloyd Budd (1934–1946): WL Budd
- Charles Budden (1900): C Budden
- James Budden (1912): JTWF Budden
- George Bull (1900): G Bull
- Mervyn Burden (1953–1963): MD Burden
- Tom Burrows (2005–2009): TG Burrows
- Lindsay Bury (1877): L Bury
- Richard Busk (1919): RD Busk
- Arthur Byng (1905): AM Byng

== C ==
- Alexander Cadell (1923–1927): AR Cadell
- Edward Cadogan (1933–1935): EH Cadogan
- Henry Calder (1882–1885): H Calder
- Harry Came (2019–2020): HRC Came
- Alastair Campbell (1908–1909): AK Campbell
- Jack Campbell (2022): JOI Campbell
- Vic Cannings (1950–1959): VHD Cannings
- Robert Caple (1961–1967): RG Caple
- Michael Carberry (2006–2017): MA Carberry
- Andy Carter (2016): A Carter
- George Carter (1869–1878): G Carter
- Donald Cartridge (1953): DC Cartridge
- Hilton Cartwright (2025–2026): HWR Cartwright
- Richard Carty (1949–1954): RA Carty
- George Case (1864): GH Case
- Alan Castell (1961–1971): AT Castell
- Edward Causton (1919): EPG Causton
- Aubrey Cecil (1876): ABC Cecil
- Egerton Cecil (1875): EDC Cecil
- Geoffrey Chance (1913): GHB Chance
- G. Chandler (1865): G Chandler (Note: Chandler made one first class appearance for Hampshire in 1865, scoring sixteen runs in two innings, with a high score of sixteen runs. He also recorded one catch and two stumpings.)
- Frank Charters (1913): FH Charters
- Thomas Chignell (1901–1904): TA Chignell
- Ian Chivers (1985–1987): IJ Chivers
- Daniel Christian (2010): DT Christian
- Dominic Clapp (2003): DA Clapp
- Stuart Clark (2007): SR Clark
- Michael Clarke (2004): MJ Clarke
- George Cole (1909–1911): GL Cole
- Matt Coles (2013–2014): MT Coles
- Thomas Collins (1935): TH Collins
- Cardigan Connor (1984–1998): CA Connor
- Dominic Cork (2009–2011): DG Cork
- Oswald Cornwallis (1921): OW Cornwallis
- Bob Cottam (1963–1971): RMH Cottam
- Richard Court (1937–1939): RCL Court
- Norman Cowans (1994–1995): NG Cowans
- Alexander Cowie (1910): AG Cowie
- Nigel Cowley (1974–1989): NGC Cowley
- Rupert Cox (1990–1994): RMF Cox
- Mason Crane (2015–2023): MS Crane
- Cosmo Crawley (1923): CS Crawley
- John Crawley (2003–2009): JP Crawley
- Len Creese (1928–1939): WCL Creese
- Edward Crofton (1881): EH Crofton
- Edmund Crofts (1885): ES Crofts
- John Crookes (1920): JE Crookes
- James Crowdy (1875–1884): JG Crowdy
- George Cull (1877): G Cull
- Cecil Currie (1881–1885): CE Currie
- Scott Currie (2020–2026): SW Currie
- Christopher Curzon (1981): CC Curzon

== D ==
- Ajeet Singh Dale (2020): AS Dale (Note: Singh Dale was known as just Ajeet Dale while representing Hampshire.)
- James Darby (1884–1897): JH Darby
- Reginald Dare (1949–1954): RA Dare
- Thomas Dashwood (1904): THK Dashwood
- Josh Davey (2013): JH Davey
- Henry Davies (1883): HGS Davies
- Gilbert Dawson (1947–1949): GW Dawson
- Harold Dawson (1947–1948): Harold Dawson
- Liam Dawson (2007–2026): LA Dawson
- Harold Day (1922–1931): HLV Day
- Thomas Dean (1939–1949): TA Dean
- William Dean (1907): W Dean
- William Deane (1895): MW Deane
- Alec Debnam (1950–1951): AFH Debnam
- Arthur Delmé-Radcliffe (1896–1900): AH Delmé-Radcliffe
- Harold Denham (1896): HA Denham
- Colin de Grandhomme (2021): C de Grandhomme
- Friedel de Wet (2011): F de Wet
- Richard Dibden (1995): RR Dibden
- William Dible (1883–1885): WG Dible
- Calvin Dickinson (2017–2018): CM Dickinson
- Michael Dighton (2004): MG Dighton
- Cecil Dixon (1929): CE Dixon
- William Dodd (1931–1935): WTF Dodd
- Aneurin Donald (2019–2023): AHT Donald
- Lewis Dorey (1925): LHJ Dorey
- J. H. Down (1914): JH Down
- Harry Downer (1946): HR Downer
- Ted Drake (1931–1936): EJ Drake
- Horatio Dumbleton (1884): HN Dumbleton
- Arthur Duncan (1878–1883): AJ Duncan
- Dunbar Duncan (1875–1885): DWJ Duncan
- Arthur Duthie (1911): AM Duthie
- Henry Dutton (1875): HJ Dutton

== E ==
- Desmond Eagar (1946–1957): EDR Eagar
- Charles Eccles (1870–1875): CV Eccles
- Joseph Eckland (2023–2024): JR Eckland
- Edward Ede, Sr. (1864–1870): EL Ede
- Edward Ede (1902–1906): EMC Ede
- George Ede (1864–1869): GM Ede
- Fidel Edwards (2015–2019): FH Edwards
- John Eggar (1938): JD Eggar
- T.C. Elliott (1842–1850): TC Elliott (Note: Elliott made four first class appearances for Hampshire between 1842 and 1850, scoring 59 runs across eight innings, with a high score of fourteen runs.)
- Nathan Ellis (2022–2023): N Ellis
- Richard Elms (1977–1978): RB Elms
- Kevin Emery (1982–1984): KSD Emery
- Edward English (1898–1901): EA English
- Sean Ervine (2005–2018): SM Ervine
- Alfred Evans (1919–1920): AE Evans
- Alfred Evans (1885): AH Evans
- John Evans (1908–1920): AJ Evans
- Bertram Evans (1900–1909): BS Evans
- Dudley Evans (1904–1911): DM Evans
- James Evans (1913–1921): J Evans
- Ralph Evans (1912): RD Evans
- William Evans (1902–1910): WHB Evans
- Rodney Exton (1946–1946): RN Exton

== F ==
- James Fellowes (1883–1885): J Fellowes
- Walter Feltham (1884): WG Feltham
- Stanley Fenley (1935): S Fenley
- Albert Fielder (1911–1913): AE Fielder
- Walter Fielder (1923): WG Fielder
- Reginald Fisher (1898): RWC Fisher
- Darren Flint (1993–1995): DPJ Flint
- Raymond Flood (1956–1960): RD Flood
- Jake Foley (2014): JM Foley
- Harold Forster (1911): HT Forster
- Henry Forster, 1st Baron Forster (1885–1895): HW Forster
- Bjorn Fortuin (2025): BC Fortuin
- Francis Foster (1876): FG Foster
- Robert St Leger Fowler (1924): RS Fowler
- Thomas Fox (1875): TC Fox
- John Francis (2001–2003): JD Francis
- Simon Francis (1997–2000): SRG Francis
- Edward Frederick (1903–1904): EB Frederick
- John Frederick (1864–1869): JS Frederick
- Frederick Freemantle (1900): FW Freemantle
- Henry Frere (1864–1866): HT Frere
- Charles Fry (1960): CA Fry
- C. B. Fry (1909–1921): CB Fry
- Stephen Fry (1922–1931): S Fry
- James Fuller (2019–2026): JK Fuller
- Charles Fynn (1930–1931): CG Fynn

== G ==
- Henry Gale (1865–1866): H Gale
- John Galpin (1875–1880): JG Galpin
- Christopher Gandy (1900): CH Gandy
- Mark Garaway (1996–1999): M Garaway
- Thomas Garnier (1864): TP Garnier
- Joe Gatting (2014–2015): JS Gatting
- Leslie Gay (1900): LH Gay
- Jack Gentry (1919): JSB Gentry
- Herbert Gibbons (1925–1928): HGC Gibbons
- Ed Giddins (2003): ESH Giddins
- Richard Gilliat (1966–1978): RMC Gilliat
- Frederick Gladdon (1905): F Gladdon
- John Godfrey (1939–1947): JF Godfrey
- Chris Goldie (1983–1985): CFE Goldie
- Jake Goodwin (2016): J Goodwin
- James Gornall (1923): JP Gornall
- David Gower (1990–1993): DI Gower
- Shaun Graf (1980): SF Graf
- Mark Gravett (1899–1900): M Gravett
- Jimmy Gray (1948–1966): JR Gray
- George Greenfield (1875): GP Greenfield
- Hubert Greenhill (1901): HM Greenhill
- Gordon Greenidge (1970–1987): CG Greenidge
- Granville Greenwood (1875): GG Greenwood
- John Gregory (1913): JT Gregory
- John Greig (1901–1922): JG Greig
- David Griffiths (2006–2013): DA Griffiths
- Gavin Griffiths (2016): GT Griffiths
- Frederick Gross (1924–1929): FA Gross
- David Guard (1946–1949): DR Guard
- Nick Gubbins (2021–2026): NRT Gubbins
- Charles Gunner (1878): CR Gunner
- John Gunner (1906–1907): JH Gunner
- George Gutteres (1882): GG Gutteres

== H ==
- Herbert Hake (1920–1925): HD Hake
- Clifford Hall (1933–1935): CG Hall
- Ernest Hall (1880–1885): E Hall
- Patrick Hall (1919–1926): PM Hall
- James Hamblin (2001–2004): JRC Hamblin
- Brett Hampton (2025): BR Hampton
- Hamza Ali (2016): Hamza Ali
- Thomas Hansen (1997–1999): TM Hansen
- Jon Hardy (1983–1985): JJE Hardy
- Lewis Harfield (1925–1931): L Harfield
- James Hargreaves (1884–1885): JH Hargreaves
- Reginald Hargreaves (1875–1885): RG Hargreaves
- Frederick Harold (1909–1912): FV Harold
- George Harris (1899): GW Harris
- Henry Harris (1880): HE Harris
- Bernard Harrison (1957–1962): BRS Harrison
- Calvin Harrison (2020): CG Harrison
- Gerald Harrison (1914–1920): GC Harrison
- Leo Harrison (1939–1966): L Harrison
- William Harrison (1902): WH Harrison
- Asher Hart (2017–2017/18): AHJA Hart
- Peter Hartley (1998–2000): PJ Hartley
- Frank Harvey (1899–1900): FN Harvey
- Ian Harvey (2008): IJ Harvey
- Peter Haslop (1962–1972): P Haslop
- Matthew Hayden (1997): ML Hayden
- Edward Haygarth (1875): EB Haygarth
- Ernest Hayter (1935–1937): E Hayter
- Montague Hayter (1904): MW Hayter
- Arthur Hayward (1925–1926): AJ Hayward
- Nantie Hayward (2008): M Hayward
- Richard Hayward (1981–1982): RE Hayward
- Edwin Hazelton (1883): EH Hazelton
- Allan Heath (1883–1885): AB Heath
- George Heath (1937–1949): GEM Heath
- Malcolm Heath (1954–1962): MB Heath
- Geoffrey Hebden (1937–1951): GGL Hebden
- Coote Hedley (1905): WC Hedley
- Edward Hemsted (1866–1869): E Hemsted
- Anthony Henley (1866): AA Henley
- Robert Henley (1875): R Henley
- Rangana Herath (2010): HMRKB Herath
- Lofty Herman (1929–1948): OW Herman
- Bob Herman (1972–1977): RS Herman
- Sir Frederick Hervey-Bathurst, 4th Baronet (1865–1866): FTA Hervey-Bathurst
- Lionel Hervey-Bathurst (1875): L Hervey-Bathurst
- Christopher Heseltine (1895–1904): C Heseltine
- Hesketh Hesketh-Prichard (1900–1913): HV Hesketh-Prichard
- Anthony Hill (1920–1930): AEL Hill
- Ledger Hill (1895–1921): AJL Hill
- Gerry Hill (1932–1954): G Hill
- Michael Hill (1973–1976): MJ Hill
- Richard Hindley (2003): RJE Hindley
- Basil Hitchcock (1896): BFB Hitchcock
- John Holder (1968–1972): JW Holder
- Ian Holland (2017–2024): IG Holland
- Thomas Hollingworth (1929): TV Hollingworth
- Henry Holmes (1864–1878): H Holmes
- Arthur Holt (1935–1948): AG Holt
- Frank Hopkins (1906–1911): FJ Hopkins
- Henry Horton (1953–1967): H Horton
- Alexander Hosie (1913–1935): AL Hosie
- Alan Hotham (1901): AG Hotham
- Benny Howell (2010–2025): BAC Howell
- Phillip Hughes (2010): PJ Hughes
- William Humphrey (1864): W Humphrey
- Walter Humphreys, Sr. (1900): WA Humphreys Sr.
- Frederick Hyland (1924): FJ Hyland
- Hector Hyslop (1876–1877): HH Hyslop

== I ==
- Imran Tahir (2008–2014): Imran Tahir
- Colin Ingleby-Mackenzie (1951–1966): ACD Ingleby-Mackenzie
- Lionel Isherwood (1919–1923): LCR Isherwood

== J ==
- Eddie Jack (2023–2026): EV Jack
- Frederick Jackman (1875–1877): F Jackman
- Kevan James (1985–1999): KD James
- Thomas Jameson (1930–1931): TGC Jameson
- Tom Jameson (1919–1932): TO Jameson
- Arthur Jaques (1913–1914): A Jacques
- Martin Jean-Jacques (1993–1994): M Jean-Jacques
- Stephen Jefferies (1988–1989): ST Jefferies
- Arthur Frederick Jeffreys (1876–1878): AF Jeffreys
- Frederick Jellicoe (1877–1880): FGG Jellicoe
- William Jephson (1903–1919): WV Jephson
- Robert Jesson (1907–1910): RWF Jesson
- Gilbert Jessop (1933): GLO Jessop
- Trevor Jesty (1966–1984): TE Jesty
- Guy Jewell (1952): GAFW Jewell
- Neil Johnson (2001–2002): NC Johnson
- Alexander Johnston (1902–1919): AC Johnston
- Henry Jolliffe (1902): JH Jolliffe
- George Jones (1937): GL Jones
- Simon Jones (2010–2011): SP Jones
- Linden Joseph (1990): LA Joseph
- Arthur Judd (1925–1935): AK Judd
- William Judd (1878): WG Judd

== K ==
- Simon Katich (2003–2012): SM Katich
- George Katinakis (1904–1905): GD Katinakis
- Henry Kay (1882): HG Kay
- James Kaye (1881): JL Kaye
- Matthew Keech (1994–1999): M Keech
- Geoff Keith (1962–1967): GL Keith
- Dominic Kelly (2022–2026): DC Kelly
- William Kendall (1996–2004): WS Kendall
- Charles Kendle (1899): CEC Kendle
- William Kendle (1869–1878): WJ Kendle
- John Kennard (1919): JAG Kennard
- Alec Kennedy (1907–1936): AS Kennedy
- Derek Kenway (1997–2005): DA Kenway
- Arthur Kimish (1946): AE Kimish
- James King (1882): J King
- Matt King (2013–2014): MJ King
- Frederick Kitchener (1896–1903): FG Kitchener
- Rory Kleinveldt (2008): RK Kleinveldt
- Arthur Kneller (1924–1926): AH Kneller
- Arthur Knight (1913–1923): AE Knight
- Charles Knott (1938–1954): CJ Knott

== L ==
- Francis Lacey (1880–1897): FE Lacey
- Bruce Lamb (1898–1901): B Lamb
- Greg Lamb (2004–2008): GA Lamb
- Walter Lancashire (1935–1937): W Lancashire
- Jason Laney (1993–2002): JS Laney
- William Langford (1902–1908): WT Langford
- Kevin Latouf (2005–2008): KJ Latouf
- Percy Lawrie (1921–1928): PE Lawrie
- Howard Lawson (1935–1937): HM Lawson
- Maurice Lawson (1907–1919): MB Lawson
- Charles Leat (1878–1885): CW Leat
- Arthur Lee (1933): AM Lee
- Edward Lee (1896–1909): EC Lee
- Jake Lehmann (2026): JS Lehmann
- Frederick Leveson-Gower (1899–1900): FAG Leveson-Gower
- Arthur Lewis (1929): AH Lewis
- Richard Lewis (1967–1976): RV Lewis
- Elisha Light (1898–1900): EE Light
- William Light (1897–1898): WF Light
- Edwin Lineham (1898): E Lineham
- Jake Lintott (2017): JB Lintott
- Francis Lipscomb (1881–1882): FW Lipscomb
- William Lipscomb (1866–1867): WH Lipscomb
- Danny Livingstone (1959–1972): DA Livingstone
- Walter Livsey (1913–1929): WH Livsey
- Charlie Llewellyn (1899–1910): CB Llewellyn
- Lewis Lodge (1900): LV Lodge
- Richard Logan (2005–2006): RJ Logan
- Adam London (2013): AB London
- Okeover Longcroft (1869–1870): OB Longcroft
- George Longman (1875–1885): GH Longman
- John Lord (1864): JC Lord
- Raymond Love (1923): RHAD Love
- H. F. Lowe (1882): HF Lowe
- Geoffrey Lowndes (1924–1935): WGLF Lowndes
- Arthur Luard (1897): AJH Luard
- Charles Lucas (1864–1880): CF Lucas
- Verner Luckin (1910–1912): VV Luckin
- Steve Lugsden (1999): S Lugsden
- Michael Lumb (2007–2011): MJ Lumb
- Manny Lumsden (2025–2026): ET Lumsden
- Algernon Lushington (1870–1877): AH Lushington
- Chris Lynn (2025): CA Lynn
- Joseph Lynn (1875): J Lynn
- George Lyon (1907): GHD Lyon

== M ==
- Sydney Maartensz (1919): SGA Maartensz
- Percy MacKenzie (1938–1939): PA MacKenzie
- Alistair MacLeod (1914–1938): A MacLeod
- Steve Malone (1980–1984): SJ Malone
- John Manners (1936–1948): JE Manners
- George Mannings (1864): G Mannings
- Robert Manser (1904): RM Manser
- Edward Mariner (1896): EC Mariner
- Aiden Markram (2019): AK Markram
- Malcolm Marshall (1979–1993): MD Marshall
- Roy Marshall (1953–1972): RE Marshall
- Charles Martin (1869–1870): C Martin
- George Martin (1898–1899): G Martin
- J. Martin (1904): J Martin
- William Martin (1867): W Martin
- Rajesh Maru (1984–1998): RJ Maru
- Dimitri Mascarenhas (1996–2013): AD Mascarenhas
- Henry Maturin (1864–1882): H Maturin
- William Maundrell (1900): WH Maundrell
- Glenn Maxwell (2012–2014): GJ Maxwell
- John May (1867–1870): J May
- Ben Mayes (2025–2026): BA Mayes
- Walter McBride (1925–1929): WN McBride
- Neil McCorkell (1932–1951): NT McCorkell
- Ben McDermott (2022–2024): BR McDermott
- Harold McDonell (1908–1921): HC McDonell
- Charlie McGibbon (1919): CE McGibbon
- Richard McIlwaine (1969–1970): RJ McIlwaine
- Arthur McIntyre (1920–1923): AS McIntyre
- Neil McKenzie (2010–2013): ND McKenzie
- Frederick McLaren (1908): FA McLaren
- Ryan McLaren (2015–2016): R McLaren
- Jono McLean (2005–2006): JJ McLean
- Nixon McLean (1998–1999): NAM McLean
- Lewis McManus (2015–2021): LD McManus
- Craig McMillan (2005): CD McMillan
- Brandon McMullen (2025): BJ McMullen
- Phil Mead (1905–1936): CP Mead
- Henry Meaden (1881): HJB Meaden
- Basil Melle (1914–1921): BGV Melle
- Edward Michell (1880): EJ Michell
- Fletcha Middleton (2021–2026): FS Middleton
- Tony Middleton (1984–1995): TC Middleton
- Stuart Milburn (1996–1997): SM Milburn
- Sir Henry Mildmay, 6th Baronet (1881–1884): HPS Mildmay
- Henry Misselbrook (1869): H Misselbrook
- John Moberly (1877): JC Moberly
- Mohammad Abbas (2021–2024): Mohammad Abbas
- William Moorcroft (1911): W Moorcroft
- John Moore (1910–1913): JWS Moore
- Dick Moore (1931–1939): RH Moore
- Henry Mordaunt, 12th Baronet (1885): HJ Mordaunt
- Robert Mornement (1906): RH Mornement
- Alex Morris (1998–2003): AC Morris
- Chris Morris (2019): CH Morris
- Sean Morris (1992–1996): RSM Morris
- Zac Morris (1998–2001): ZC Morris
- Tom Mottram (1971–1977): TJ Mottram
- Mujeeb Ur Rahman (2018): Mujeeb Ur Rahman
- Alan Mullally (1988–2005): AD Mullally
- Charlie Mumford (2022): CS Mumford
- Colin Munro (2018): C Munro
- George Munsey (2020): HG Munsey
- Henry Murgatroyd (1883): H Murgatroyd
- Andy Murtagh (1973–1977): AJ Murtagh
- Johann Myburgh (2010/11–2011): JG Myburgh

== N ==
- Andrew Neal (2025–2026): AJ Neal
- Michael Neser (2024): MG Neser
- Jack Newman (1906–1930): JA Newman
- Edward Newton (1900): E Newton
- Mark Nicholas (1978–1995): MCJ Nicholas
- Victor Norbury (1905–1906): DV Norbury
- Marcus North (2009): MJ North
- Sam Northeast (2018–2021): SA Northeast
- Frank Burnell-Nugent (1904): FH Nugent (Note: Burnell-Nugent changed his name in 1905. While playing for Hampshire he played under the surname Nugent.)
- Tom Nugent (2014): TM Nugent

== O ==
- Eric Olivier (1911): E Olivier
- Sidney Olivier (1895): SR Olivier
- Felix Organ (2017–2026): FS Organ
- Ali Orr (2024–2026): AGH Orr
- Hugh Orr (1902–1907): HJ Orr
- David O'Sullivan (1971–1973): DR O'Sullivan

== P ==
- Thomas Page (1900): TH Page
- Cecil Palmer (1899–1907): CH Palmer
- Rodney Palmer (1930–1933): RH Palmer
- Cecil Paris (1933–1948): CGA Paris
- William Paris (1875–1881): W Paris
- Frederick Parker (1946): FAV Parker
- John Parker (1926–1933): JP Parker
- Bobby Parks (1980–1992): RG Parks
- Tom Parsons (2009): TW Parsons
- Walter Parsons (1882): WD Parsons
- Alfred Parvin (1885): AW Parvin
- George Passmore (1896): G Passmore
- Chetan Patel (1997): CM Patel
- Kenneth Paver (1925–1926): KE Paver
- Stanley Pearce (1885): SHH Pearce
- Walter Pearce (1923–1926): WK Pearce
- Francis Pember (1885): FW Pember
- Henry Persse (1905–1909): HW Persse
- Harry Petrie (2022–2026): HW Petrie (Note: Petrie made his debut in May 2022 in a first-class match against a Sri Lanka Development XI. He had previously played for the Hampshire Second XI and the Hampshire Academy, while he also represented Dorset in the Minor Counties Trophy and represented England U19s. He signed a rookie-deal with Hampshire in November 2021. Petrie later re-signed for the club for the 2026 One-Day Cup.)
- Howard Phillips (1899–1902): HW Phillips
- Dan Piachaud (1960): JD Piachaud
- Kevin Pietersen (2005–2010): KP Pietersen
- Albert Pillans (1896): AA Pillans
- Alfred Pink (1885): A Pink
- Raymond Pitman (1954–1959): RWC Pitman
- Henry Plowden (1865): HM Plowden
- Nick Pocock (1976–1984): NEJ Pocock
- Robert Poore (1898–1906): RM Poore
- Albert Porter (1895): AL Porter
- Michael Porter (2014): MJ Porter
- Delano Potgieter (2026): D Potgieter
- Nic Pothas (2002–2011): N Pothas
- Arthur Pothecary (1927–1946): AE Pothecary
- Sidney Pothecary (1912–1920): SG Pothecary
- Daren Powell (2007): DBL Powell
- Ernest Powell (1884–1885): EO Powell
- Walter Powys (1877–1878): WN Powys
- Tom Prest (2021–2026): TJ Prest
- Lhuan-dre Pretorius (2025): LG Pretorius
- Lawrence Prittipaul (1999–2005): LR Prittipaul
- Rowland Prothero, 1st Baron Ernle (1875–1883): RE Prothero
- Bill Proud (1938–1939): RB Proud
- Ralph Prouton (1949–1954): RO Prouton

== Q ==
- Glen Querl (2013): RG Querl
- Francis Quinton (1895–1900): FWD Quinton
- James Quinton (1895–1899): JM Quinton

== R ==
- Ajinkya Rahane (2019): AM Rahane
- George Raikes (1900–1902): GB Raikes
- Victor Ransom (1947–1950): VJ Ransom
- Tim Ravenscroft (2011): TJ Ravenscroft
- John Rawlence (1934): JR Rawlence
- Alan Rayment (1949–1958): AWH Rayment
- Robert Raynbird (1878): R Raynbird
- Walter Raynbird (1880–1881): W Raynbird
- Ollie Rayner (2018): OP Rayner
- Ernest Read (1903): EG Read
- Harry Redhouse (1900): H Redhouse
- Barry Reed (1958–1972): BL Read
- Elvis Reifer (1984): EL Reifer
- Ernest Remnant (1908–1922): ER Remnant
- Simon Renshaw (1996–2000): SJ Renshaw
- Hamza Riazuddin (2008–2013): H Riazuddin
- John Rice (1971–1982): JM Rice
- Arthur Richards (1884–1904): AC Richards
- Barry Richards (1968–1978): BA Richards
- Cyril Richards (1895): CJR Richards
- Charles Ridding (1864): CH Ridding
- Alfred Ridley (1884–1885): AB Ridley
- Arthur Ridley (1875–1878): AW Ridley
- Anthony Rimell (1946–1950): AGJ Rimell
- Nathan Rimmington (2014): NJ Rimmington
- Andy Roberts (1973–1978): AME Roberts
- Michael Roberts (2013): MDT Roberts
- Ollie Robinson (2014): OE Robinson
- Charles Robson (1895–1906): C Robson
- David Rock (1976–1979): DJ Rock
- Herbert Rogers (1912–1914): HJ Rogers
- Neville Rogers (1946–1955): NH Rogers
- Colin Roper (1957): C Roper
- Donald Roper (1947): DGB Roper
- Rilee Rossouw (2017–2019): RR Rossouw
- Adam Rouse (2013): AP Rouse
- H. F. Russell (1884): HF Russell
- William Russell (1898): WC Russell
- Arnold Rutherford (1912): AP Rutherford
- John Rutherford (1913): JS Rutherford
- Frank Ryan (1919–1920): FP Ryan

== S ==
- Peter Sainsbury (1954–1976): PJ Sainsbury
- Matt Salisbury (2017): MET Salisbury
- Daren Sammy (2016): DJG Sammy
- George Sandeman (1913): GAC Sandeman
- Lee Savident (1997–2000): L Savident
- James Schofield (2001–2002): JEK Schofield
- Richard Scott (1986–1990): RJ Scott
- William Scott (1927): WEN Scott
- Tom Scriven (2018–2021): TAR Scriven
- Andrew Sexton (2000): AJ Sexton
- Alfred Seymour (1870): A Seymour
- Charles Seymour (1880–1885): CR Seymour
- Derek Shackleton (1948–1970): D Shackleton
- Bilal Shafayat (2012): BM Shafayat
- Owais Shah (2014–2015): OA Shah
- Shaheen Afridi (2020): Shaheen Afridi
- Shahid Afridi (2011–2017): Shahid Afridi
- Tabraiz Shamsi (2019): T Shamsi
- Shan Masood (2024/25): Shan Masood
- Ashutosh Sharma (2026): AR Sharma
- Edgar Sheldrake (1884–1885): EFT Sheldrake
- Jack Sheppard (2013): JD Sheppard
- Thomas Sheppard (1905): TW Sheppard
- Ian Shield (1939): INR Shield
- Kevin Shine (1989–1993): KJ Shine
- William Shirley (1922–1925): WRD Shirley
- Alan Shirreff (1946–1947): AC Shirreff
- D'Arcy Short (2021): DJM Short
- Herbert Shutt (1906): H Shutt
- Valentine Simpson (1885): V Simpson
- Chris Smith (1980–1991): CL Smith
- Hamilton Smith (1909–1914): HAH Smith
- Robin Smith (1982–2003): RA Smith
- Thomas Smith (1923–1924): TM Smith
- Will Smith (2014–2017): WR Smith
- George Smoker (1885): G Smoker
- Henry Smoker (1901–1907): HG Smoker
- Henry Soames (1867): H Soames
- Oli Soames (2018–2020): OC Soames
- Thomas Soar (1895–1904): T Soar
- Sohail Tanvir (2013): Sohail Tanvir
- John Southern (1975–1983): JW Southern
- James Southerton (1864–1867): J Southerton
- Adolphus Sparrow (1902): AJ Sparrow
- Joshua Spencer-Smith (1864): GJ Spencer-Smith
- Orlando Spencer-Smith (1866): O Spencer-Smith
- James Spens (1884–1899): J Spens
- Henry Sprinks (1925–1929): HRJ Sprinks
- Edward Sprot (1898–1914): EM Sprot
- Cameron Steel (2021): CT Steel
- David Steele (1895–1906): DA Steele
- John Steele (1938–1939): JWJ Steele
- Bob Stephenson (1969–1980): GR Stephenson
- John Stephenson (1995–2001): JP Stephenson
- Keith Stevenson (1978–1983): K Stevenson
- Ryan Stevenson (2015–2021): RA Stevenson
- Herbert Stewart (1869): H Stewart
- William Stewart (1869–1878): WA Stewart
- Dale Steyn (2018): DW Steyn
- Mitchell Stokes (2005–2007): MST Stokes
- Jimmy Stone (1900–1914): J Stone
- Mark Stoneman (2025): MD Stoneman
- Heath Streak (1995): HH Streak
- Tristan Stubbs (2026): T Stubbs
- Herbert Studd (1898): HW Studd
- Reginald Studd (1895): RA Studd
- Henry Style (1865): WHM Style
- James Sutcliffe (1911): JF Sutcliffe
- Thomas Sutherland (1898–1899): T Sutherland
- Ernest Sykes (1896): EC Sykes

== T ==
- Edward Tate (1898–1902): E Tate
- Frederick Tate (1870–1876): F Tate
- Henry Tate (1869–1885): HW Tate
- Robert Tayler (1866): RF Tayler
- Brad Taylor (2013–2019): BJ Taylor
- Billy Taylor (2004–2009): BV Taylor
- George Taylor (1935–1939): GR Taylor
- John Taylor (1947–1949): JD Taylor
- Mike Taylor (1973–1980): MNS Taylor
- Lionel Tennyson, 3rd Baron Tennyson (1913–1935): LH Tennyson
- Sean Terry (2012–2015): SP Terry
- Paul Terry (1978–1996): VP Terry
- Hugh Thompson (1953–1954): HRP Thompson
- Mark Thorburn (2003): M Thorburn
- Robert Thorne (1883): R Thorne
- Dominic Thornely (2006): DJ Thornely
- Philip Thresher (1865–1869): P Thresher
- Martin Thursfield (1992–1996): MJ Thursfield
- Brian Timms (1959–1968): BSV Timms
- Edward Tolfree (1906–1919): E Tolfree
- James Tomlinson (2002–2016): JA Tomlinson
- Reece Topley (2016–2018): RJW Topley
- Geoffrey Toynbee (1912): GPR Toynbee
- Stanley Toyne (1905): SM Toyne
- Chris Tremlett (2000–2009): CT Tremlett
- Tim Tremlett (1976–1991): TM Tremlett
- Sampson Tubb (1864–1867): S Tubb
- James Tuck (1877–1882): JJ Tuck
- Derek Tulk (1956–1957): DT Tulk
- David Turner (1968–1989): DR Turner
- Francis Turner (1912): FG Turner
- Ian Turner (1989–1993): IJ Turner
- John Turner (2021–2025): JA Turner

== U ==
- George Ubsdell (1864–1870): G Ubsdell
- Shaun Udal (1989–2007): SD Udal
- George Underdown (1882–1885): G Underdown
- Richard Utley (1927–1928): RPH Utley

== V ==
- Chaminda Vaas (2003): WPUJC Vaas
- Charles van der Gucht (2000): CG van der Gucht
- Tilak Varma (2025): NTT Varma
- James Vince (2009–2026): JM Vince
- Adam Voges (2007): AC Voges

== W ==
- David Wainwright (2016): DJ Wainwright
- Alan Waldron (1948): ANE Waldron
- Clifford Walker (1949–1954): C Walker
- Donald Walker (1937–1939): DF Walker
- Frank Walkinshaw (1885): F Walkinshaw
- Nesbit Wallace (1884): NW Wallace
- Francis Walton (1864–1866): F Walton
- Albert Ward (1921): AP Ward
- Charles Ward (1897–1901): CG Ward
- Herbert Ward (1895–1897): HF Ward
- John Ward (1877): J Ward
- Merrik Ward (1927–1929): MDC Ward
- Shane Warne (2000–2007): SK Warne
- Washington Sundar (2025): Washington Sundar
- Wasim Akram (2003): Wasim Akram
- Alan Wassell (1957–1966): AR Wassell
- Arthur Watson (1885): AL Watson
- Ian Watson (1973): IR Watson
- Shane Watson (2004–2005): SR Watson
- Alfred Watts (1882): AW Watts
- Joe Weatherley (2016–2026): JJ Weatherley
- Philip Weaver (1938): PHP Weaver
- Arthur Webb (1895–1904): AS Webb
- Hubert Webb (1954): HE Webb
- Edward Whalley-Tooker (1883–1885): E Whalley-Tooker
- Brad Wheal (2015–2026): BTJ Wheal
- Adam Wheater (2013–2016): AJA Wheater
- Keith Wheatley (1965–1970): KJ Wheatley
- Walter Wheeler (1878–1880): WC Wheeler
- Paul Whitaker (1994–1998): PR Whitaker
- William Whitcher (1864–1867): W Whitcher
- Butch White (1957–1971): DW White
- Giles White (1994–2004): GW White
- William White (1903–1914): WN White
- Ross Whiteley (2022–2023): RA Whiteley
- Tom Wild (1880): T Wild
- William Wild (1877): W Wild
- George Wilder (1909): G Wilder
- Edmund Willes (1865): EHL Willes
- George Williams (1904): GE Williams
- Ollie Williams (2026): OS Williams (Note: Williams made his debut in July 2026 in a List A match against Yorkshire. He had previously played for the Hampshire Second XI and the Hampshire Academy, before signing a professional contract for the 2026 One-Day Cup.)
- Frederick Willoughby (1885): FG Willoughby
- Thomas Wilson (1870–1870): TH Wilson
- Alfred Wood (1901): AH Wood
- Arthur Wood (1870–1885): AH Wood
- Chris Wood (2010–2026): CP Wood
- Julian Wood (1989–1993): JR Wood
- Matthew Wood (1876): M Wood
- Maxmillian Wood (1907): MDF Wood
- Kenneth Woodroffe (1912–1913): KHC Woodroffe
- Jimmy Wootton (1895–1900): J Wootton
- Larry Worrell (1969–1972): LR Worrell
- H. W. Wright (1885): HW Wright
- Francis Wyatt (1905–1919): FJC Wyatt
- Teddy Wynyard (1878–1908): EG Wynyard

== Y ==
- Charles Yaldren (1912): CH Yaldren
- Yasir Arafat (2015): Yasir Arafat
- Humphrey Yates (1910–1913): HWM Yates
- Charles Young (1867–1885): CR Young
- Codi Yusuf (2026): CE Yusuf

== See also ==
- List of Hampshire County Cricket Club captains

== Bibliography ==
- ACS (1981). A Guide to Important Cricket Matches Played in the British Isles 1709 – 1863. Nottingham: ACS.
- ACS (1982). A Guide to First-Class Cricket Matches Played in the British Isles. Nottingham: ACS.
- Wisden. Pardon, Sydney (ed.). Wisden Cricketers' Almanack, 32nd edition (1895 ed.). London: John Wisden & Co. Ltd.
