= Edward Ede =

Edward Ede may refer to:

- Edward Ede (cricketer, born 1834), English cricketer
- Edward Ede (cricketer, born 1881), his son, English cricketer
