= Fynn =

Fynn is a surname and given name. Notable people with the surname include:

- Charles Fynn (1897–1976), English cricketer
- David Fynn, Irish actor, producer and screenwriter
- Henry Francis Fynn (1803–1861), English traveler and trader
- James Fynn (1893–1917), English recipient of the Victoria Cross
- James Lindsay-Fynn (born 1975), British rower
- Mark Fynn (born 1985) Zimbabwean tennis player.
- Paula Fynn (born 1988), team handball player from Uruguay
- Percival Fynn (1872–1940), Rhodesian diplomat and politician
- Warrick Fynn (born 1985), cricketer

Given name

- Fynn Arkenberg (born 1996), German footballer
- Fynn Hudson-Prentice (born 1996), English cricketer
- Fynn Lakenmacher (born 2000), German footballer
- Fynn Otto (born 2002), German footballer
- Fynn Seidel (born 2004), German footballer
- Fynn Talley (born 2002), English footballer

== See also ==
- Fynn, pseudonymous writer of Mister God, This Is Anna and its sequels (1970s), probably Sydney George Hopkins
