= Arthur McIntyre =

Arthur McIntyre may refer to:

- Arthur McIntyre (cricketer, born 1918) (1918–2009), English cricketer
- Arthur McIntyre (cricketer, born 1889) (1889–1945), English cricketer
- Arthur McIntyre (artist) (1945–2003), Australian artist and art critic
