= Alfred Watts =

Alfred Watts may refer to:

- Alfred Watts (cricketer) (1859–?), English cricketer
- Alfred Watts (South Australian politician) (1815–1884), Australian politician
- Alfred Watts (Western Australian politician) (1873–1954, Australian politician
- Alf Watts, British Communist

== See also ==
- Alfred Watt, priest
