= James Tuck =

James Tuck may refer to:

- James Tuck (archaeologist) (1940–2019), Canadian archaeologist
- James L. Tuck (1910–1980), British physicist
- James Tuck (cricketer) (1853–1918), English cricketer
- James Tuck (Canadian football) (born 1990), Canadian football player
