= William Moorcroft =

William Moorcroft may refer to:

- William Moorcroft (cricketer) (fl. 1911), English cricketer
- William Moorcroft (explorer) (1770–1825), English explorer and veterinarian
- William Moorcroft (potter) (1872–1945)
