= List of Hampshire county cricketers to 1863 =

This is a list of cricketers who represented the Hampshire county team in historically important matches before the creation of Hampshire County Cricket Club on 12 August 1863. (Note: Any match listed in the ACS' Important Match Guide (1981) is historically important, and therefore of the highest standard, whether or not a scorecard might exist. The same applies to numerous matches discovered by researchers since 1981. For further information, see First-class cricket.) The county club played its first matches in the 1864 season, and this list is limited to those who played for the county until 1863. Some players listed here played for the county both before and after August 1863, so they also appear in List of Hampshire County Cricket Club players.

This list uses the layout style of player's usual name followed by the seasons he was active at county level, and then his name in scorecard format with any useful notes in brackets.

== Key ==
- † preceding a player's name means that the original article is now a redirect to this list.

== Bibliography ==
- ACS (1981). A Guide to Important Cricket Matches Played in the British Isles 1709–1863. Nottingham: ACS. OCLC 85045528.
- Haygarth, Arthur (1996) [1862]. Scores & Biographies, Volume 1 (1744–1826). Kennington: Frederick Lillywhite. ISBN 978-19-00592-23-9.
- Haygarth, Arthur (1997) [1862]. Scores & Biographies, Volume 2 (1827–1840). Kennington: Frederick Lillywhite. ISBN 978-19-00592-23-9.
