= Delme =

Delme may refer to:

- Delme, Moselle, a commune in the Moselle department in Grand Est in France
- Canton of Delme, a former French administrative division located in the department of the Moselle and the Lorraine region
- Delme (river), a river of Lower Saxony, Germany

== People with that surname ==
- Peter Delmé (banker) (died 1728), British figure in commerce and banking
- Peter Delmé (MP for Ludgershall and Southampton) (1710–1770), wealthy English merchant and landowner, Member of Parliament
- Peter Delmé (MP for Morpeth) (1748–1789), English Member of Parliament
- Arthur Delmé-Radcliffe (1870–1950), English first-class cricketer
