= Misselbrook =

Misselbrook is an English surname and may refer to:

- Henry Misselbrook (1832–1895), an English cricketer
- Misselbrook and Weston, an English convenience store chain since taken over by Tesco; see Brighton Hill
- Daryl Misselbrook, a special educational needs specialist and area manager in Hampshire
