= Causton =

Causton may refer to:

- Edward Causton (1876–1957), English cricketer
- Richard Causton (composer) (born 1971), English composer and teacher
- Richard Causton, 1st Baron Southwark PC, DL (1843–1929), English stationer and Liberal politician
- Causton, county town of the fictional Midsomer County in the Midsomer Murders novels and television series

== See also ==
- Caston
