= Bernhard Bentinck =

English cricketer

Personal information
- Full name: Bernhard Walter Bentinck
- Born: 16 July 1877; South Warnborough, Hampshire, England
- Died: 27 June 1931 (aged 53); Winchester, Hampshire, England
- Batting: Right-handed
- Relatives: Charles Seymour (brother-in-law)

Domestic team information
- Years: Team
- 1900–1902: Hampshire

Career statistics
Competition	First-class
Matches	2
Runs scored	26
Batting average	6.50
100s/50s	0/0
Top score	15
Catches/stumpings	1/–
- Source: Cricinfo, 8 January 2010

Bernhard Walter Bentinck (16 July 1877 – 27 June 1931) was an English first-class cricketer, barrister and an officer in the First World War, serving with the British Army and the newly formed Royal Air Force.

The son of Walter Theodore Edward Bentinck, he was born in July 1877 at South Warnborough, Hampshire. He was educated at Winchester College, before going up to Exeter College, Oxford to study law. He played first-class cricket for Hampshire in 1900 and 1902, against Leicestershire and Surrey respectively. He had little success in his two first-class matches, scoring 26 runs with a highest score of 15. He was described by Wisden as "possessing a fine drive". He played his club cricket for Alton Cricket Club, being dismissed in unusual fashion while playing for them when he was bowled by Henry Roberts after the ball had deflected off, and killed, a swallow. A member of the Middle Temple, he was called to the bar in 1902, where he practiced on the Western Circuit. Bentinck served in the Rifle Brigade with the 13th Battalion in the First World War, being appointed a temporary lieutenant in February 1915, with appointment to the temporary rank of captain in October of the same year. He transferred to the newly formed Royal Air Force in April 1918, retaining the temporary rank of captain. His military service finished in February 1919. Bentinck died at Winchester in June 1931. His brother-in-law was Charles Seymour, a fellow first-class cricketer.
