= Guy Jewell =

English cricketer and SAS officer

Personal information
- Full name: Guy Alonzo Frederick William Jewell
- Born: 6 October 1916; Axford, Hampshire, England
- Died: 23 December 1965 (aged 49); Basingstoke, Hampshire, England
- Batting: Left-handed
- Bowling: Slow left-arm wrist-spin

Domestic team information
- Years: Team
- 1938: Berkshire
- 1952: Hampshire

Career statistics
| Competition | First-class |
|---|---|
| Matches | 1 |
| Runs scored | 1 |
| Batting average | 0.50 |
| 100s/50s | –/– |
| Top score | 1 |
| Balls bowled | 66 |
| Wickets | 1 |
| Bowling average | 52.00 |
| 5 wickets in innings | – |
| 10 wickets in match | – |
| Best bowling | 1/38 |
| Catches/stumpings | 2/– |
- Source: Cricinfo, 6 January 2010

Guy Alonzo Frederick William Jewell MC (6 October 1916 – 23 December 1965) was an English first-class cricketer, British Army officer, and educator.

Jewell was born in October 1916 at Axford, Hampshire. He studied at the University of Reading prior to the Second World War, graduating in 1937. After graduating from Reading, Jewell took up a teaching post at Queen Mary's School for Boys, Basingstoke. He played minor counties cricket for Berkshire in 1938, making five appearances in the Minor Counties Championship. Jewell served in the Second World War, being commissioned as a second lieutenant into the Royal Artillery in December 1940. In the final year of the war, he was decorated with both the Military Cross in February 1945 and the Czechoslovak Military Cross in May. He ended the war with the acting rank of major.

Following the end of the war, Jewell returned to his career as a teacher. A club cricketer for Basingstoke and North Hants Cricket Club, he was a highly successful slow left-arm wrist-spin, taking more than 100 wickets each season from 1948 to 1956. On several occasions he took all 10 wickets in an innings, and in one 12-a-side match in 1956, he took all 11 wickets. After strong performances at club level, Jewell made a single appearance in first-class cricket for Hampshire against Glamorgan at Swansea in the 1952 County Championship. Batting twice in the match, he was dismissed without scoring by Wilf Wooller in Hampshire's first innings, while in their second innings he was run out for a single run. With the ball, he went wicketless in Glamorgan's first innings, before taking the wicket of Willie Jones in their second innings. In the same year that he played for Hampshire, Jewell set up the Guy Jewell Cup at Basingstoke and North Hants, which was created to give local cricketers, playing for the surrounding village teams, a chance to play at May's Bounty; it is still contested as of 2026.

Jewell died at Basingstoke on 23 December 1965. At the time of his death, he was deputy head teacher and head of mathematics at Queen Mary's School for Boys. Following his death, a new cricket pavilion was opened in his memory at the school by his friend, the commentator John Arlott, in June 1967.
