= William Eccles (cricketer) =

English cricketer, cricket administrator and soldier

Personal information
- Full name: William Hall Eccles
- Born: 24 March 1838; Davenham, Cheshire, England
- Died: 18 April 1900 (aged 62); Folkestone, Kent, England
- Batting: Right-handed
- Relatives: Charles Eccles (brother)

Domestic team information
- Years: Team
- 1866–1867: Marylebone Cricket Club

Career statistics
Competition	First-class
Matches	2
Runs scored	30
Batting average	15.00
100s/50s	–/–
Top score	17
Catches/stumpings	–/–
- Source: Cricinfo, 29 May 2021

William Hall Eccles (24 March 1838 – 18 April 1900) was an English first-class cricketer, cricket administrator and British Army officer.

The son of William Eccles, he was born in March 1838 at Davenham, Cheshire. Eccles was commissioned into the British Army as an ensign with the Rifle Brigade in February 1855, receiving a promotion to lieutenant in June of the same year. He saw action during the Crimean War, during which he was described as "an intrepid character". He later purchased the rank of captain in May 1861. Eccles retired from active service in October of the same year, before resigning his commission fully in April 1868. A keen cricketer, Eccles had an association with cricket in Hampshire and the Isle of Wight. He served as the honorary secretary of Hampshire County Cricket Club from 1867 to 1869, having replaced George Ede.

In addition to his role as an administrator, Eccles was also played two first-class cricket matches for the Marylebone Cricket Club in 1866 and 1867, both against Sussex at Hove. He scored 30 runs in these matches, with a highest score of 17. He was also a playing member of the nomadic I Zingari club. He was resident in Hampshire at Fair Oak and was a justice of the peace for the county. Eccles died suddenly while attending the Radnor Club at Folkestone in April 1900. He was survived by his wife, Emma Cornelia. His brother, Charles, was also a first-class cricketer.
