= Axford, Hampshire =

Hamlet in Hampshire, England

Coordinates: 51.1868°N 1.1285°W

Axford
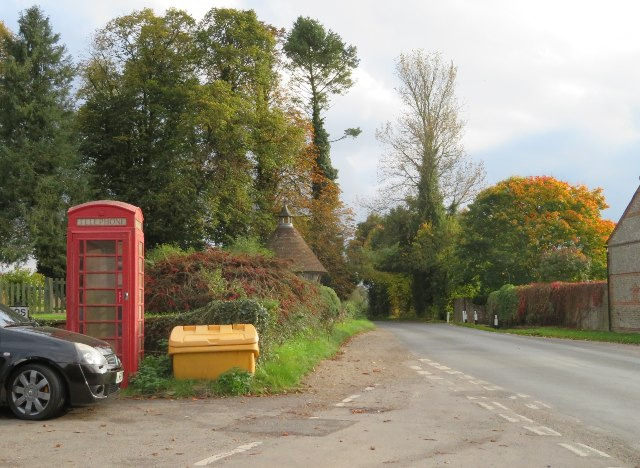
- Phone box and pavilion in Axford

- Location within Hampshire
- OS grid reference: SU610433
- District: Basingstoke and Deane
- Shire county: Hampshire
- Region: South East
- Country: England
- Sovereign state: United Kingdom
- Post town: BASINGSTOKE
- Postcode district: RG25
- Dialling code: 01256
- Police: Hampshire and Isle of Wight
- Fire: Hampshire and Isle of Wight
- Ambulance: South Central
- UK Parliament: Basingstoke
- Website: Preston Candover and Nutley Parish Council

Axford is a hamlet in the Basingstoke and Deane district of Hampshire, England. The settlement is within the civil parish of Nutley, and is located approximately 5.5 miles (8.9 km) south-west of Basingstoke.

== Governance ==
The hamlet of Axford is part of the civil parish of Nutley, which is part of the parish council of Preston Candover and Nutley. It is also part of the Upton Grey and the Candovers ward of Basingstoke and Deane borough council. The borough council is a Non-metropolitan district of Hampshire County Council.
