= Maurice Lawson =

English cricketer

Personal information
- Full name: Maurice Bertie Lawson
- Born: 28 February 1885; Christchurch, Hampshire, England
- Died: 8 August 1961 (aged 76); Alton, Hampshire, England
- Batting: Right-handed
- Bowling: Right-arm fast-medium
- Relatives: Howard Lawson (son)

Domestic team information
- Years: Team
- 1907–1919: Hampshire

Career statistics
| Competition | First-class |
|---|---|
| Matches | 7 |
| Runs scored | 122 |
| Batting average | 12.20 |
| 100s/50s | –/– |
| Top score | 36 |
| Balls bowled | 228 |
| Wickets | 5 |
| Bowling average | 34.00 |
| 5 wickets in innings | – |
| 10 wickets in match | – |
| Best bowling | 2/45 |
| Catches/stumpings | 2/– |
- Source: Cricinfo, 4 February 2010

Maurice Bertie Lawson (28 February 1885 — 8 August 1961) was an English first-class cricketer.

Lawson was born in February 1885 at Christchurch, Hampshire. Lawson made his debut in first-class cricket for Hampshire against Somerset at Taunton in the 1907 County Championship. He made four further appearances in 1907, before making a further appearance in the 1909 County Championship against Gloucestershire. Lawson was commissioned into the Royal Engineers in April 1918 as a second lieutenant, serving in the final five months of the First World War. Following the war, he made a further appearance in first-class cricket for Hampshire against Kent at Tunbridge Wells in the 1909 County Championship. In seven first-class matches for Hampshire, he scored 122 runs at an average of 12.20, with a highest score of 36. With the ball, he took 5 wickets with best figures of 2 for 45. He continued his military career after the war until September 1921, when he relinquished his commission whilst serving with the 43rd (Wessex) Divisional Engineers. Outside of cricket, he was an architect by profession. Lawson was married to Lillian Swaine, with the couple having two children: Howard and Neil. Howard also played first-class cricket for Hampshire. Lawson designed his family home, Firlands, in the grounds of the Camberley Court Hotel in Surrey; at the beginning of the Second World War, Firlands was sold and Lawson moved into the hotel, which was run by his wife and daughter-in-law. Lawson died in August 1961 at Alton, Hampshire.
