= Dunbar Duncan =

English cricketer (1852–1919)

Personal information
- Full name: Dunbar Wilson Johnston Duncan
- Born: 8 July 1852; Southampton, Hampshire, England
- Died: 12 December 1919 (aged 67); Regent's Park, London, England
- Batting: Right-handed
- Bowling: Unknown
- Relatives: Arthur Duncan (brother)

Domestic team information
- Years: Team
- 1875–1885: Hampshire

Career statistics
| Competition | First-class |
|---|---|
| Matches | 17 |
| Runs scored | 581 |
| Batting average | 22.34 |
| 100s/50s | –/4 |
| Top score | 87* |
| Balls bowled | 60 |
| Wickets | 3 |
| Bowling average | 6.00 |
| 5 wickets in innings | – |
| 10 wickets in match | – |
| Best bowling | 1/1 |
| Catches/stumpings | 4/– |
- Source: Cricinfo, 8 December 2009

Dunbar Wilson Johnston Duncan (8 July 1852 – 12 December 1919) was an English first-class cricketer.

Duncan was born at Southampton in July 1852. A heavy run-scorer in club cricket for Swanmore in local league cricket, Duncan made his debut in first-class cricket for Hampshire against Sussex at Winchester in 1875, debuting alongside his brother Arthur. He played first-class cricket until Hampshire lost its first-class status in 1885, having made seventeen appearances. In these, he scored 581 runs at an average of 22.34; he made four half centuries, with a highest score of 87 not out. The Hampshire Advertiser posthumously described him as "an excellent bat, with a most graceful style". Despite the loss of Hampshire's first-class status, Duncan continued to play second-class cricket for Hampshire until 1889. Duncan died at Regent's Park in London on 12 December 1919.
