= Ernest Hayter =

English cricketer

Personal information
- Full name: Ernest Hayter
- Born: 31 July 1913; Bournemouth, Hampshire, England
- Died: 16 December 2005 (aged 92); Southampton, Hampshire, England
- Batting: Right-handed
- Bowling: Leg break

Domestic team information
- Years: Team
- 1935–1937: Hampshire

Career statistics
Competition	First-class
Matches	3
Runs scored	36
Batting average	7.20
100s/50s	–/–
Top score	17
Balls bowled	66
Wickets	0
Bowling average	–
5 wickets in innings	–
10 wickets in match	–
Best bowling	–
Catches/stumpings	–/–
- Source: Cricinfo, 16 January 2010

Ernest Hayter (31 July 1913 — 16 December 2005) was an English first-class cricketer and footballer.

Hayter was born at Bournemouth in July 1913. His father was the secretary of Brockenhurst Cricket Club in the New Forest. He was a member of the ground staff at Hampshire by the mid-1930s, and made his debut in first-class cricket against Derbyshire at Queen's Park, Chesterfield in the 1935 County Championship. He made two further first-class appearances for Hampshire in 1937, against Cambridge University at Basingstoke, and Northamptonshire at Rushden in the County Championship. In these, he scored 36 runs with a highest score of 17. Hayter was released at the end of the 1937 season, alongside Howard Lawson, having "not progress[ed] in the way hoped and expected".

Outside of cricket, Hayter played football as a goalkeeper for Lymington Town. In 1936, he had trials with Norwich City. In August 1937, while at sea on board SS Dunvegan Castle, Hayter was the victim of an attempted murder, when he was stabbed by Antonio Mifsud, a Maltese kitchen porter. He later served in the Royal Air Force during the Second World War, playing minor exhibition matches for the Royal Air Force cricket team during the war. Hayter died suddenly whilst playing golf at Southampton in December 2005, aged 92. He had resided during his final years at Bartley, Hampshire.
