= Nutley, Hampshire =

Village and parish in Hampshire, England

Coordinates: 51.1927°N 1.1265°W

Nutley
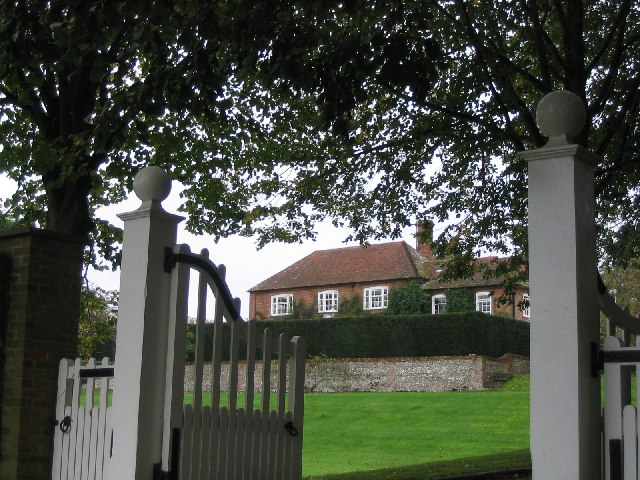
- Nutley Manor Farm

- Location within Hampshire
- Population: 196 (2011 Census including Farleigh Wallop)
- OS grid reference: SU5538837410
- District: Basingstoke and Deane
- Shire county: Hampshire
- Region: South East
- Country: England
- Sovereign state: United Kingdom
- Post town: BASINGSTOKE
- Postcode district: RG25
- Dialling code: 01256
- Police: Hampshire and Isle of Wight
- Fire: Hampshire and Isle of Wight
- Ambulance: South Central
- UK Parliament: North East Hampshire
- Website: Preston Candover and Nutley Parish Council

Nutley is a small village and civil parish in the Basingstoke and Deane district of Hampshire, England. It is located approximately 5.6 miles (9.0 km) south-west from Basingstoke, just off the B3046 road. The parish has an acreage of 1,524 acres (617 ha) with 74 acres (30 ha) made up of permanent grass and 386 acres (156 ha) of woodland.

== Governance ==
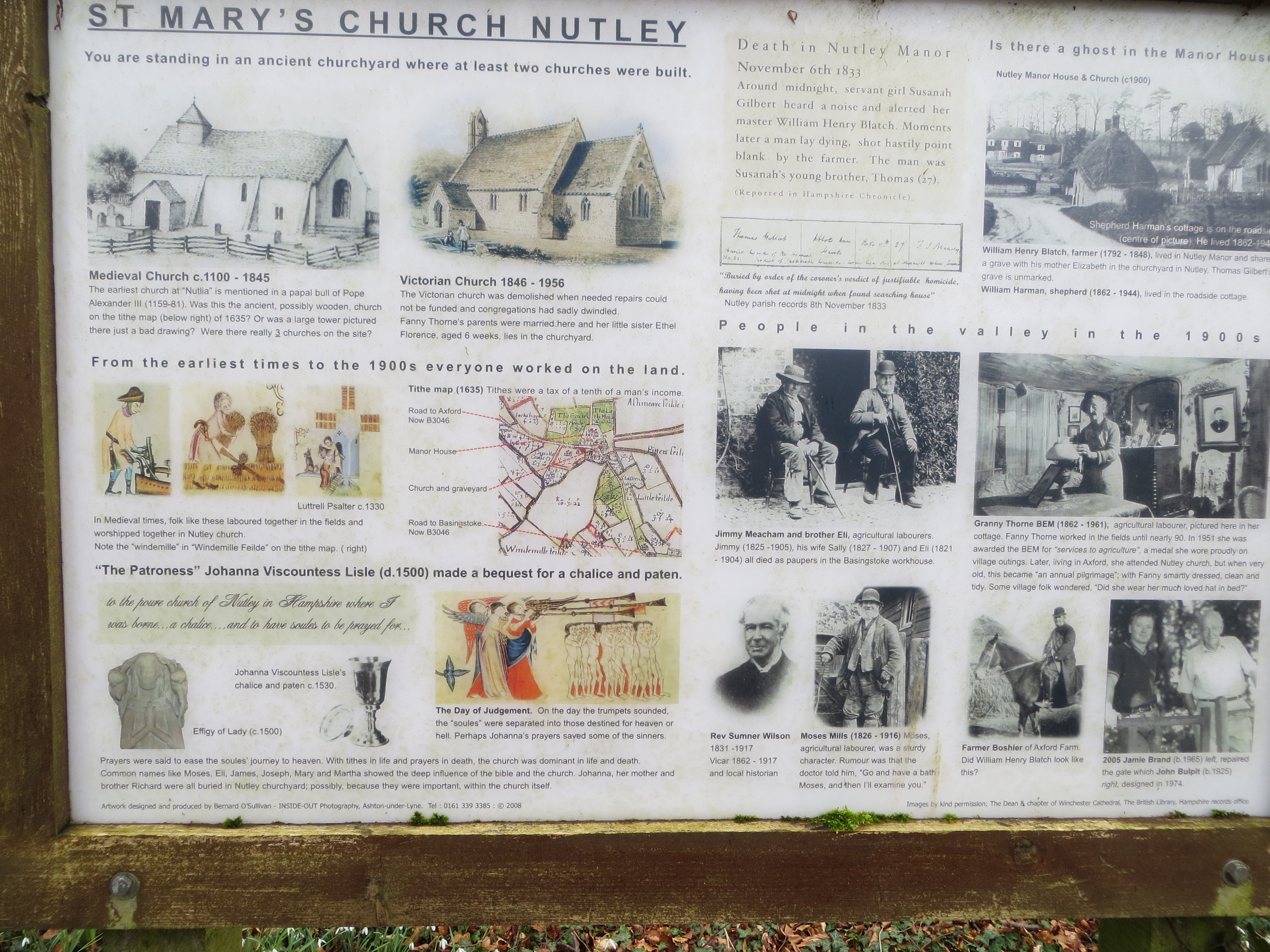
Information board at the site of St Mary's Church

The village of Nutley is part of the civil parish of Nutley, which is part of the parish council of Preston Candover and Nutley. It is also part of the Upton Grey and the Candovers ward of Basingstoke and Deane borough council. The borough council is a Non-metropolitan district of Hampshire County Council.
