= Arthur Duncan (English cricketer) =

English cricketer

Personal information
- Full name: Arthur James Duncan
- Born: 21 November 1856; Southampton, Hampshire, England
- Died: 26 August 1936 (aged 79); Wandsworth, London, England
- Batting: Right-handed
- Relatives: Dunbar Duncan (brother)

Domestic team information
- Years: Team
- 1878–1883: Hampshire

Career statistics
Competition	First-class
Matches	2
Runs scored	28
Batting average	7.00
100s/50s	–/–
Top score	26
Catches/stumpings	–/–
- Source: Cricinfo, 4 January 2010

Arthur James Duncan (21 November 1856 – 26 August 1936) was an English first-class cricketer.

Duncan was born in Southampton in November 1856. He made two appearances in first-class cricket for Hampshire on two occasions. The first came against Kent at Southampton in 1878; against Kent, he played alongside his brother, Dunbar. Five years later, he made his second appearance against Sussex at Southampton; In these, he scored 26 runs at an average of exactly 7. Duncan died in Wandsworth in November 1856.
