= Edmund Crofts =

English cricketer and British Army officer

Personal information
- Full name: Edmund Sclater Crofts
- Born: 23 January 1859; Winchester, Hampshire, England
- Died: 23 December 1938 (aged 79); Carlton, Bedfordshire, England
- Batting: Right-handed

Domestic team information
- Years: Team
- 1885: Hampshire

Career statistics
Competition	First-class
Matches	1
Runs scored	5
Batting average	2.50
100s/50s	–/–
Top score	3
Catches/stumpings	–/–
- Source: Cricinfo, 7 January 2010

Edmund Sclater Crofts (23 January 1859 – 23 December 1938) was an English first-class cricketer and British Army officer.

== Biography ==
The son of Edmund William Crofts, he was born at Winchester in January 1859. He was educated at Winchester College, before going up to Keble College, Oxford. After graduating from Oxford, Crofts pursued a career in the British Army. He passed out from the Royal Military College in August 1880, entering into the 37th Foot as a second lieutenant. In July of the following year he was promoted to lieutenant and was serving in the 1st Battalion of the Royal Hampshire Regiment. Crofts played first-class cricket for Hampshire in 1885, appearing in a single match against the Marylebone Cricket Club at Southampton. Batting twice in the match, he was dismissed in the Hampshire first innings for 3 runs by William Attewell, while in their second innings following-on, he was dismissed for 2 runs by William Gunn.

In the army, he was promoted to captain in August 1886, and served with the Burmese expedition in 1887 (for which he received the India General Service Medal with clasps). He was promoted to major on 27 March 1897. Three years later he again saw active service in the Second Boer War, where he took part in operations in the Orange River Colony in August 1900, including the attack on Winburg and the capture of Boer Commandant Cornelis Hermanus Olivier. Following the end of the war in June 1902, he returned to the United Kingdom on the SS European which arrived at Southampton in early September. He was placed on retired pay in January 1907, but returned to active service in November 1914 to serve in the First World War in command of the 13th Battalion of the Royal Hampshire Regiment. He held the temporary rank of lieutenant colonel in 1915, and relinquished his command of the 13th Battalion in September of the same year.

Crofts died at Carlton in Bedfordshire on 23 December 1938, leaving an estate worth £30,172.
