= Robert Raynbird =

English cricketer

Personal information
- Born: 29 May 1851; Laverstoke, Hampshire, England
- Died: 26 December 1920 (aged 69); Basingstoke, Hampshire, England
- Relatives: Walter Raynbird (brother)

Domestic team information
- Years: Team
- 1878: Hampshire

Career statistics
Competition	First-class
Matches	1
Runs scored	0
Batting average	0.00
100s/50s	0/0
Top score	0
Balls bowled	12
Wickets	0
Bowling average	–
5 wickets in innings	–
10 wickets in match	–
Best bowling	–
Catches/stumpings	0/–
- Source: Cricinfo, 30 December 2009

Robert Raynbird (29 May 1851 — 26 December 1920) was an English first-class cricketer.

The son of Hugh E. Raynbird, he was born in May 1851 at Laverstock, Hampshire. His father was a land manager for the Marquess of Winchester. He was a prominent club cricketer in Basingstoke, playing for Basingstoke Cricket Club, for whom he would later hold the positions of treasurer and secretary. Raynbird made a single appearance in first-class cricket for Hampshire against Kent in 1878. He was dismissed for without scoring in both of Hampshire's innings by George Hearne and Dick Penn respectively, and bowled twelve balls in Kent's only innings, conceding fifteen runs.

Outside of cricket, he was an auctioneer, surveyor and land agent with the family firm, Raynbird and Sons. He was also the honorary secretary of the Basingstoke Sheep Fair, having succeeded his brother Walter (who was also a first-class cricketer) in that role in 1883. He also volunteered in the Hampshire Regiment, being commissioned as a lieutenant in July 1886 and resigning his commission in November 1889. Raynbird died at Basingstoke in December 1920.
