= Bill Proud =

English cricketer

Personal information
- Full name: Roland Barton Proud
- Born: 29 September 1919; Bishop Auckland, County Durham, England
- Died: 27 October 1961 (aged 42); Bishop Auckland, County Durham, England
- Batting: Right-handed
- Bowling: Right-arm medium

Domestic team information
- Years: Team
- 1938–1939: Hampshire
- 1939: Oxford University
- 1946–1955: Durham
- 1950: Minor Counties

Career statistics
Competition	First-class
Matches	18
Runs scored	681
Batting average	21.28
100s/50s	–/4
Top score	87
Catches/stumpings	7/–
- Source: Cricinfo, 31 January 2010

Roland Barton "Bill" Proud (29 September 1919 – 27 October 1961) was an English first-class cricketer.

The son of the Durham cricketer Ernest Proud, he was born in Bishop Auckland in September 1919. He was educated at Winchester College, where he played for the college cricket team from 1936 to 1938, captaining the team in his final year. It was during his final year at Winchester that he made his debut in first-class cricket for Hampshire against Derbyshire at Chesterfield in the County Championship, with him playing two further matches that season against Surrey and Nottinghamshire at Bournemouth. From Winchester, he matriculated to Brasenose College, Oxford.

In November 1938, he was commissioned into the 6th Battalion, Durham Light Infantry as a second lieutenant. Proud played first-class cricket for Oxford University during his freshman year in 1939, making ten appearances; he gained his blue by playing in The University Match against Cambridge University at Lord's, in which he made 87 in the Oxford second innings to help them to a 45-run victory. During the summer holidays, he played a further four first-class matches for Hampshire in the 1939 County Championship. With the outbreak of the Second World War and cancellation of first-class cricket, his first-class career came to an abrupt end.

Following the war, he played minor counties cricket for Durham, for whom he made his debut against Northumberland in the 1946 Minor Counties Championship. He played minor counties cricket for Durham until 1955, making 63 appearances. He was appointed Durham captain in 1948, an appointment he held until his retirement in 1955. He made one final appearance in first-class cricket in 1950, when he was chosen to represent the combined Minor Counties cricket team against the touring West Indians at Norwich. This brought his total first-class appearances to eighteen, in which he scored 681 runs at an average of 21.28. After he retired from minor counties cricket, he continued to play club cricket for Bishop Auckland. Outside of cricket, he was a farmer who acted as steward of the Durham County Agricultural Show. Proud died at Bishop Auckland in October 1961.
