= Billy Gladdon =

English cricketer (1880–1961)

Personal information
- Full name: William Thomas Alexander Gladdon
- Born: 9 June 1880; Peckham, Surrey, England
- Died: 17 February 1961 (aged 80); Bedhampton, Hampshire, England
- Batting: Unknown
- Bowling: Unknown

Domestic team information
- Years: Team
- 1905: Hampshire

Career statistics
Competition	First-class
Matches	1
Runs scored	1
Batting average	0.50
100s/50s	–/–
Top score	1
Balls bowled	168
Wickets	0
Bowling average	–
5 wickets in innings	–
10 wickets in match	–
Best bowling	–
Catches/stumpings	–/–
- Source: Cricinfo, 19 January 2010

William 'Billy' Thomas Alexander Gladdon (born 9 June 1880 — 17 February 1961) was an English first-class cricketer and footballer.

Gladdon was born at Peckham in June 1880. A professional club cricketer for Freshwater on the Isle of Wight, he made a single appearance in first-class cricket for Hampshire against Warwickshire at Southampton in the 1905 County Championship. Batting twice in the match, he was dismissed for a single run in Hampshire's first innings by Frank Field, while in their second innings he was dismissed without scoring by Sydney Santall. Across the match, he also bowled 28 overs in Warwickshire's first innings, but did not take a wicket. Outside of cricket, Gladdon was a prominent figure in Portsmouth League football, playing for and captaining East Southsea F.C. In 1926, he was appointed groundsman and coach at The Portsmouth Grammar School (PGS) following the school's acquisition of land behind the Hilsea Lines, where a cricket ground was constructed. During his time at PGS, he was credited with producing many of the school's best cricketers. Gladdon died at his residence in Bedhampton in February 1961. Following his death, he was described by the Portsmouth Evening News as "an outstanding sportsman".
