= Aubrey Cecil =

English cricketer

Personal information
- Full name: Aubrey Bruce Cooper Cecil
- Born: 10 March 1847; Toddington, Bedfordshire, England
- Died: 21 January 1900 (aged 52) at sea, near Santa Cruz Islands, Pacific Ocean
- Batting: Right-handed
- Relatives: Egerton Cecil (brother)

Domestic team information
- Years: Team
- 1876: Hampshire

Career statistics
Competition	First-class
Matches	1
Runs scored	6
Batting average	3.00
100s/50s	–/–
Top score	4
Catches/stumpings	–/–
- Source: Cricinfo, 26 January 2010

Aubrey Bruce Cooper Cecil (10 March 1847 — 21 January 1900) was an English first-class cricketer.

The son of Moses Tearle (who changed his surname to Cecil), he was born at Toddington Manor in Bedfordshire in July 1853. He played first-class for Hampshire in 1876, making a single appearance against Derbyshire at Derby in 1875. Batting twice in the match, he was dismissed for 2 runs in Hampshire's first innings by John Platts, while following-on in their second innings, he was dismissed for 4 runs by William Hickton.

Outside of cricket, Cecil was a ships' surgeon, though it is unclear how he came about his medical qualification. He later emigrated to Australia with his wife, where he worked as a government agent from 1882 aboard ships voyaging around the South Pacific. Cecil was aboard the barquentine Coquette in January 1900 when he fell ill at Flinders Island near Tasmania. Over the coming weeks he gradually became more ill, and subsequently died on board the ship on 21 January near the Santa Cruz Islands, where he was buried at sea. His brother, Egerton, was also a first-class cricketer.
