= Henry Tate (cricketer) =

English cricketer

Personal information
- Full name: Henry William Tate
- Born: 4 October 1849; Lyndhurst, Hampshire, England
- Died: 9 May 1936 (aged 86); Richmond, Surrey, England
- Height: 5 ft 7 in (1.70 m)
- Batting: Right-handed
- Bowling: Right-arm roundarm fast
- Relatives: Frederick Tate (brother)

Domestic team information
- Years: Team
- 1869–1886: Hampshire

Umpiring information
- FC umpired: 1 (1882)

Career statistics
Competition	First-class
Matches	29
Runs scored	499
Batting average	11.08
100s/50s	–/1
Top score	61*
Balls bowled	4,814
Wickets	96
Bowling average	18.16
5 wickets in innings	6
10 wickets in match	1
Best bowling	6/51
Catches/stumpings	26/–
- Source: Cricinfo, 16 February 2010

Henry William Tate (4 October 1849 — 9 May 1936) was an English first-class cricketer.

The son of Thomas Turner Tate, he was born at Lyndhurst in October 1849. An all-rounder who bowled right-arm roundarm fast, Tate made his debut in first-class cricket for Hampshire against the Marylebone Cricket Club (MCC) at Lord's in 1869, with him featuring in the return fixture at Southampton. He took 13 wickets across these two matches, which included two five wicket hauls. He was engaged by Richmond Cricket Club as their professional in 1874 and 1875. Following a six-year gap, Tate returned to first-class cricket in 1875, when he made four appearances and took 11 wickets. The following season, he made a further four first-class appearances, in which he took 14 wickets and one five wicket haul against Kent at Faversham.

In 1877, he took 18 wickets from five matches, which included career-best figures of 6 for 76 against Derbyshire. He bettered this in 1878 by taking 6 for 51 against Kent; across the season from five matches, he took 20 wickets at an average of 12.65. He also made his only career half-century with the bat during the 1878 season, which came against Kent in the same match that he took his career-best bowling figures. Tate did not play for Hampshire in 1879, but did return in 1880, when he made a further four appearances. He took 12 wickets from four matches in 1881, with a four-year gap following before he made a final first-class appearance against Kent in 1885, which was to be Hampshire's last season with first-class status until 1895, following a series of poor seasons. He continued to play second-class cricket for Hampshire in 1886.

Tate made 29 first-class appearances for Hampshire, taking 96 wickets at an average of 18.16; he took five wickets in an innings on six occasions, and took ten-wickets in a match once. Described by Arthur Haygarth in Scores and Biographies as "an average bat", he scored 499 runs at a batting average of 11.08. It was noted by Haygarth that he fielded at short-slip. During his playing career, Tate also stood as an umpire in one first-class match between Sussex and Hampshire at Hove in 1882. Tate died at Richmond on 9 May 1936, and was buried at Richmond Cemetery. His brother, Frederick, was also a first-class cricketer.
