= Edward Whalley-Tooker =

English cricketer and farmer

Personal information
- Full name: Edward Whalley-Tooker
- Born: 15 January 1863; Wem, Shropshire, England
- Died: 23 November 1940 (aged 77); Hambledon, Hampshire, England
- Batting: Right-handed
- Bowling: Unknown-arm underarm slow

Domestic team information
- Years: Team
- 1883-1885: Hampshire

Career statistics
Competition	First-class
Matches	3
Runs scored	20
Batting average	4.00
100s/50s	–/–
Top score	7
Catches/stumpings	–/–
- Source: Cricinfo, 12 December 2009

Edward Whalley-Tooker JP (15 January 1863 — 23 November 1940) was an English first-class cricketer and farmer.

The son of Hyde Whalley-Toker, he was born in January 1863 at Wem, Shropshire. Whalley-Tooker was educated at Eton College. He made two appearances in first-class cricket for Hampshire, against Sussex at Southampton in 1883, and against the same opposition at Hove in 1885. He was engaged in farming at Hinton Daubney, where he farmed a flock of sheep. Whalley-Toker was a member of Hambledon Cricket Club, which he captained for 37 years, and was a descendant of a member of the original Hambledon Club, which gave him a proud link to cricketing history.

By 1907, the Broadhalfpenny Down ground which had been used by the original Hambledon Club had been turned over to agricultural use by the Pease family. It was at this time that Whalley-Toker helped to organise the commissioning and erection of a monument to the original Hambledon Club and entered into discussions with Hampshire County Cricket Club to play a commemorative first-class match at the ground featuring a Hambledon XI and an England XI, an idea which had been suggested by C. B. Fry. And so the match was organised for the end of the 1908 season, with Hampshire captain Edward Sprot unveiling the monument. In the first-class fixture, Whalley-Toker captained the Hambledon XI, in what his first appearance in first-class cricket in 23 years, to a five wicket victory. After the match, the ground was turned back over to farming. However, Whalley-Tooker took it upon himself to secure the land for permanent use as a cricket ground. This was achieved by 1925, when Hambledon played Winchester College, who had been given possession of the land. Outside of cricket and farming, he was a justice of the peace for Hampshire. Whalley-Tooker died at Hambledon in November 1940, following a short illness.
