= Geoffrey Toynbee =

English cricketer

Personal information
- Full name: Geoffrey Percy Robert Toynbee
- Born: 18 May 1885; Paddington, London, England
- Died: 15 November 1914 (aged 29); Ploegsteert, Hainaut, Belgium
- Batting: Right-handed
- Relatives: Walter Toynbee (uncle)

Domestic team information
- Years: Team
- 1912: Marylebone Cricket Club
- 1912: Hampshire

Career statistics
Competition	First-class
Matches	3
Runs scored	18
Batting average	6.00
100s/50s	–/–
Top score	14
Catches/stumpings	1/–
- Source: Cricinfo, 17 January 2010

Geoffrey Percy Robert Toynbee (18 May 1885 — 15 November 1914) was an English first-class cricketer and British Army officer.

== Cricket and military career ==
The son of Percy Toynbee and Frances Raitt, he was born at Paddington in May 1885. He was educated at Winchester College, where he played for the college cricket team. From Winchester, he attended the Royal Military College, Sandhurst. There he played for the Sandhurst XI, becoming one of the college's most successful batsman in its history, averaging 70.71 in 1904 and 42.33 in 1905. He graduated from Sandhurst into the Rifle Brigade as a second lieutenant in August 1905, with promotion to lieutenant following in May 1909. In 1911, while playing cricket for the Green Jackets against Aldershot Command, he made scores of 115 and 101 not out. A member of the Marylebone Cricket Club (MCC) since 1904, Toynbee made his debut in first-class cricket for the MCC against Kent in 1912 at Lord's. His performances in army matches bought him to the attention of Hampshire County Cricket Club, with him making two first-class appearances for the club in the 1912 County Championship against Gloucestershire at Southampton and Sussex at Portsmouth. He scored 18 runs in his three first-class matches, with a highest score of 14.

In February 1914, he was promoted to captain, in addition to being placed in command of a company of the 1st Battalion of the Rifle Brigade while serving in British India. When the First World War began in July 1914, Toynbee travelled at his own expense to join the 1st Battalion at Le Havre on 23 August 1914 to provide reinforcements for the Battle of Le Cateau. The 1st Battalion later took part in the Battle's of the Marne, Aisne and Battle of Messines. In November 1914, he took part in actions at Ploegsteert Wood in Belgium, where he was killed on 15 November 1914. His body was never recovered, but he is commemorated on the Ploegsteert Memorial to the Missing.
