= Henry Roberts (cricketer) =

English cricketer

Cricket information
- Batting: Right-handed
- Bowling: Right-arm medium

Career statistics
Competition	First-class
Matches	157
Runs scored	2,302
Batting average	13.30
100s/50s	1/4
Top score	124*
Balls bowled	16,567
Wickets	342
Bowling average	24.17
5 wickets in innings	18
10 wickets in match	2
Best bowling	7/32
Catches/stumpings	70/–
- Source: CricInfo

Henry Edmund Roberts (8 February 1888 – 28 June 1963) was an English first-class cricketer. Roberts was a fast bowler for Sussex, debuting in 1911. He ended his career 14 years later and in 1927 became coach of the Sandhurst Royal Military Academy.
