= Walter Pearce (English cricketer) =

English cricketer, cricket administrator, soldier, solicitor

Personal information
- Full name: Walter Kennedy Pearce
- Born: 2 April 1893; Bassett, Hampshire, England
- Died: 31 July 1960 (aged 67); Romsey, Hampshire, England
- Batting: Right-handed

Domestic team information
- Years: Team
- 1923–1926: Hampshire

Career statistics
| Competition | First-class |
|---|---|
| Matches | 9 |
| Runs scored | 127 |
| Batting average | 18.14 |
| 100s/50s | –/1 |
| Top score | 63 |
| Catches/stumpings | 1/– |
- Source: Cricinfo, 28 December 2009

Walter Kennedy Pearce (2 April 1893 — 31 July 1960) was an English first-class cricketer, cricket administrator, and solicitor.

The son of Arthur William Pearce (1858–1928) and his wife Frederica Emma, née Maund (1853–1932), he was born in April 1893 at Bassett in Southampton. He was educated at Malvern College. After completing his education at Malvern, Pearce was commissioned into the Hampshire Regiment as a second lieutenant in December 1912, with promotion to lieutenant in June 1914. He served with the Hampshire Regiment during the First World War, during which he was promoted to captain in April 1917, antedated to June 1916. Following the war, he relinquished his commission in July 1921. Transferring to the Territorial Army Reserve, he was promoted to major in October 1922.

Pearce played first-class cricket for Hampshire, making his debut against Gloucestershire at Gloucester in the 1923 County Championship. He played first-class cricket for Hampshire as a batsman until 1926, making nine appearances. In these, he scored 127 runs at an average of 18.14, with a single half century score of 63. Pearce made this score against Glamorgan in 1923, sharing in a partnership of 162 for the eighth wicket with Phil Mead. He later served Hampshire in an administrative capacity as club chairman in the late 1930s and during the Second World War, during which he played a pivotal role ensuring the club's continuing function during wartime. He was later elected the first life vice-president of the club in 1953.

Outside of cricket, he was by professional a solicitor based in Southampton. In his capacity as a solicitor, he served as a Commissioners for Oaths and a clerk to the justices at Hythe. During the Second World War, he volunteered with the National Defence Companies; following the war, having exceeded the age for recall, he resigned his commission for a second time in November 1948. Pearce died at Romsey in July 1960. Following his death, he left £100 to Lyndhurst Cricket Club, where he had been a member.
