= John Rutherford (Hampshire cricketer) =

English cricketer

Personal information
- Full name: John Seymour Rutherford
- Born: 27 February 1890; Highclere, Hampshire, England
- Died: 14 April 1943 (aged 53); Oxford, Oxfordshire, England
- Batting: Right-handed
- Bowling: Right-arm medium
- Relatives: Arnold Rutherford (brother)

Domestic team information
- Years: Team
- 1913: Hampshire

Career statistics
Competition	First-class
Matches	8
Runs scored	128
Batting average	9.14
100s/50s	–/–
Top score	33*
Balls bowled	198
Wickets	3
Bowling average	36.66
5 wickets in innings	–
10 wickets in match	–
Best bowling	1/4
Catches/stumpings	1/–
- Source: Cricinfo, 3 March 2010

John Seymour Rutherford (27 February 1890 – 14 April 1943) was an English first-class cricketer.

The son of the soldier J. A. Rutherford, he was born in February 1892 at Highclere, Hampshire. He was educated at Repton School. Rutherford played first-class cricket for Hampshire in the 1913 County Championship, making his debut against Derbyshire at Southampton. He made a further seven appearances that season, scoring 128 runs at an average of 9.14, with a highest score of 33 not out. With his right-arm medium pace bowling, he also took three wickets. Rutherford served in the British Army during the First World War, being commissioned as a second lieutenant into the Hampshire Regiment in September 1914. He relinquished his commission on account of ill-health in September 1916 and was granted the honorary rank of lieutenant. Following the war, he gained employment as a solicitors clerk. Rutherford died at Oxford in April 1943. His brother, Arnold, was also a first-class cricketer.
