= Charles Seymour (cricketer) =

English cricketer

Personal information
- Full name: Charles Read Seymour
- Born: 6 February 1855; Winchfield, Hampshire, England
- Died: 6 November 1934 (aged 79); Winchester, Hampshire, England
- Batting: Right-handed
- Relatives: Bernhard Bentinck (brother-in-law)

Domestic team information
- Years: Team
- 1879: Marylebone Cricket Club
- 1880–1888: Hampshire

Career statistics
Competition	First-class
Matches	16
Runs scored	485
Batting average	17.32
100s/50s	–/2
Top score	77*
Catches/stumpings	12/–
- Source: Cricinfo, 31 January 2010

Charles Read Seymour JP (6 February 1855 — 6 November 1934) was an English first-class cricketer and barrister.

The son of the Reverend Charles Frederic Seymour, Rector of Winchfield, he was born at Winchfield in February 1855. He was educated at Harrow School, but did not play for the school cricket team. From there, he matriculated to Merton College, Oxford. A student of the Inner Temple, he was later called to the bar to practice as a barrister in 1880. Seymour made his debut in first-class cricket for the Marylebone Cricket Club (MCC) against Lancashire at Lord's in 1879. The following season, he played first-class cricket for Hampshire, making his debut for the county against the MCC at Lord's. He played first-class cricket for Hampshire until 1885, making fifteen appearances. In his fifteen matches, he scored 481 runs at an average of 18.50, making two half centuries with a highest score of 77 not out. Wisden described him as a "smart point" fielder, taking 12 catches. Despite Hampshire losing their first-class status at the end of the 1885 season, Seymour continued to play second-class county cricket for Hampshire until 1888. In later life, he was a justice of the peace for both Hampshire and Wiltshire. Seymour died at Winchester in November 1934. His brother-in-law was the cricketer Bernhard Bentinck.
