= Howard Lawson =

English cricketer

Personal information
- Full name: Howard Maurice Lawson
- Born: 22 May 1914; Bournemouth, Hampshire, England
- Died: 21 October 2006 (aged 92); Worthing, Sussex, England
- Batting: Right-handed
- Bowling: Right-arm fast-medium
- Relatives: Maurice Lawson (father)

Domestic team information
- Years: Team
- 1935–1937: Hampshire

Career statistics
Competition	First-class
Matches	46
Runs scored	560
Batting average	10.00
100s/50s	–/1
Top score	53
Balls bowled	5,076
Wickets	71
Bowling average	36.23
5 wickets in innings	2
10 wickets in match	–
Best bowling	5/91
Catches/stumpings	18/–
- Source: Cricinfo, 20 February 2010

Howard Maurice Lawson (22 May 1914 — 21 October 2006) was an English first-class cricketer.

The son of the cricketer Maurice Lawson, he was born at Bournemouth in May 1914. Lawson made his debut in first-class cricket for Hampshire against Essex at Chelmsford in the 1935 County Championship, with him making seven appearances in that season's County Championship, alongside appearing for the Gentlemen in the Gentlemen v Players fixture at Folkestone. During his debut season, he took 12 wickets with his right-arm fast-medium bowling at an average of exactly 45. With the bat, he scored 155 runs at an average of 17.22, making one half century (53) against Essex at Bournemouth, sharing in a last-wicket partnership of 78 with Gerry Hill.

Lawson established himself in the Hampshire team in 1936, making 21 appearances in the County Championship. In these, he took 54 wickets at an average of 31.22, with two five wicket hauls and best figures of 5 for 91. Although he never passed fifty with the bat, he scored 303 runs at an average of 8.65. However, he dropped out of the Hampshire team during the 1937, making just seven first-class appearances; in these, he took 5 wickets and scored 101 runs. In 45 first-class matches for Hampshire, he took 69 wickets at an average of 36.14. As a lower order batsman, he scored 527 runs, averaging 9.41 runs per innings. He was noted by John Arlott as having a "lively action" who was at his best opening with the new ball, delivering mainly inswingers. Lawson was released at the end of the 1937 season alongside Ernest Hayter, having "not progress[ed] in the way hoped and expected".

Lawson served in the Second World War with the Royal Engineers, being commissioned as a second lieutenant in October 1941. He died in Worthing on 21 October 2006.
