= William Light (cricketer) =

English cricketer

Personal information
- Full name: William Frederick Light
- Born: 1 March 1878; Winchester, Hampshire, England
- Died: 10 November 1930 (aged 52); Exeter, Devon, England
- Batting: Left-handed
- Bowling: Right-arm fast Slow left-arm orthodox
- Relatives: Elisha Light (brother)

Domestic team information
- Years: Team
- 1897–1898: Hampshire
- 1902–1928: Devon

Career statistics
| Competition | First-class |
|---|---|
| Matches | 12 |
| Runs scored | 101 |
| Batting average | 5.94 |
| 100s/50s | –/– |
| Top score | 41 |
| Balls bowled | 695 |
| Wickets | 10 |
| Bowling average | 34.30 |
| 5 wickets in innings | – |
| 10 wickets in match | – |
| Best bowling | 3/32 |
| Catches/stumpings | 9/– |
- Source: Cricinfo, 12 February 2010

William Frederick Light (1 March 1878 — 10 November 1930) was an English first-class cricketer.

Light was born at Winchester in March 1878. A professional cricketer, he made his debut in first-class cricket for Hampshire against Essex at Southampton in the 1897 County Championship. He played first-class cricket for Hampshire until 1898, making twelve appearances. Playing as a left-arm fast-medium and slow left-arm orthodox bowler, he took 10 wickets for Hampshire at an average of 34.30, with best figures of 3 for 32. Following the 1898 season, he was employed as a cricket coach at Marlborough College, before moving to Devon, qualifying to play for Devon County Cricket Club by 1902 having gained his residential qualification. His debut for Devon in minor counties cricket came against Monmouthshire in the 1902 Minor Counties Championship. Light played minor counties cricket for Devon until 1928, making 165 appearances. He took 587 wickets for Devon at an average of 17.41, taking a five wicket haul on 43 occasions and ten wickets in a match on seven occasions. His best innings bowling figures were 9 for 55. He is Devon's second highest wicket-taker in the Minor Counties Championship, behind Doug Yeabsley (733). Light also scored 6,388 runs in the Minor Counties Championship for Devon, at a batting average of 28.86. He made seven centuries and 38 half centuries, with a highest score of 157. Light married at Crediton in September 1905, and died suddenly at Exeter in November 1930. His brother, Elisha, was also a first-class cricketer.
