= Harold Forster =

English cricketer

Personal information
- Full name: Harold Thomas Forster
- Born: 17 November 1878; Winchester, Hampshire, England
- Died: 29 May 1918 (aged 39) near Ventelay, Marne, France
- Batting: Left-handed
- Bowling: Left-arm slow-medium

Domestic team information
- Years: Team
- 1911: Hampshire

Career statistics
Competition	First-class
Matches	5
Runs scored	33
Batting average	6.60
100s/50s	–/–
Top score	13
Balls bowled	494
Wickets	10
Bowling average	21.20
5 wickets in innings	1
10 wickets in match	–
Best bowling	5/38
Catches/stumpings	3/–
- Source: Cricinfo, 15 January 2010

Harold Thomas Forster DSO & Bar MC & Bar (14 November 1878 – 29 May 1918) was an English first-class cricketer and an officer in the British Army. Forster began his military career in 1897 with as a ranking with the Royal Marines Light Infantry. He would later join the Royal Berkshire Regiment as a non-commissioned officer and serve in the First World War, where he gained a commission with the Royal Berkshire's. He would become one of the most decorated first-class cricketers to serve in the war, being awarded the Distinguished Service Order and the Military Cross and earning a bar to both. Forster would be killed in action at the Third Battle of the Aisne, in late-May 1918.

Prior to the First World War, he played first-class cricket for Hampshire on five occasions, taking ten wickets and one five wicket haul.

== Early life and cricket ==
The son of Brian Robert Forster and his wife, Victoria, he was born at St Faith in Winchester in November 1878. After completing his education, Forster decided on a career in the military. He joined the Royal Marines Light Infantry in 1897, but later bought himself out and returned to civilian life. However, he re-enlisted into the British Army as a non-commissioned rank with the Royal Berkshire Regiment. During his service, his leadership qualities were quickly recognised, and he was eventually promoted to the rank of company sergeant major (CSM). Forster later played cricket at first-class level for Hampshire, debuting for the county against the Marylebone Cricket Club (MCC) at Lord's in 1911. He took a five wicket haul in this match, with figures of 5 for 38 in the MCC's first innings, before taking 4 for 54 in their second innings. He made four further first-class appearances for Hampshire, all coming in the 1911 County Championship. Playing as a slow-medium bowler, he took 10 wickets (though took just one following his debut) at an average of 21.20. Hampshire attempted to persuade Forster to play professionally by offering to but him out of his army contract, however, he turned down their offer. In addition to playing cricket, he also played field hockey for his regiment.

== First World War service ==
During the First World War, Forster travelled with his battalion to the Western Front, where he was wounded in action on 30 October 1914. After a period of convalescence back home, he returned to the Western Front and gained a commission as a second lieutenant with the 2nd Battalion, Royal Berkshire Regiment. He was promoted to lieutenant in December 1915. In June 1916, he was mentioned in despatches, and in August 1916 he was awarded the Military Cross (MC) for distinguished conduct in the field while still a CSM. He was appointed a battalion adjutant in October 1916, with a further mention in despatches in May 1917. Forster was made a Companion of the Distinguished Service Order (DSO) in September 1917, alongside a bar to his MC. He achieved his DSO and medal bar when he took command of his battalion after its colonel became a casualty. Forster subsequently led the battalion with great skill to its objective, twice changing direction in order to avoid hostile barrage. It was noted that he remained perfectly cheerful throughout, showing a fine example of fearlessness and contempt for danger.

Having again been mentioned in despatches in December 1917. In April 1918, Forster was attached to the 2nd Battalion, Northamptonshire Regiment as an acting major and second-in-command; he assumed command of the battalion when the lieutenant-colonel was presumed killed on 24 April. Forster himself was killed in action at Bouleuse Ridge during the Third Battle of the Aisne on 29 May 1918. He was initially only reported missing, and it took until 23 March 1919 for his death to be confirmed. One of the most decorated cricketers to have served in the First World War, Forster was buried at the Terlincthun British Cemetery. He was posthumously awarded a bar to his DSO for the first few days of his command of the 2nd Battalion, Northamptonshire Regiment, when he assumed command and successfully extricated it from a critical situation. He was survived by his widow, Victoria, and several children.
