= Anthony Rimell =

English cricketer

Personal information
- Full name: Anthony Geoffrey Jordan Rimell
- Born: 29 August 1928; Kasauli, Punjab, British India
- Died: 18 October 2007 (aged 79); Sonning, Berkshire, England
- Batting: Left-handed
- Bowling: Right-arm off break

Domestic team information
- Years: Team
- 1946–1950: Hampshire
- 1949–1950: Cambridge University

Career statistics
Competition	First-class
Matches	23
Runs scored	854
Batting average	28.46
100s/50s	1/3
Top score	160
Balls bowled	3,456
Wickets	40
Bowling average	36.12
5 wickets in innings	1
10 wickets in match	–
Best bowling	6/100
Catches/stumpings	13/–
- Source: Cricinfo, 15 February 2010

Anthony Geoffrey Jordan Rimell (29 August 1928 — 18 October 2007) was an English first-class cricketer and businessman.

Rimmell was born in British India at Kasauli in August 1928. He was educated in England at Charterhouse School, where he played for the school cricket team. He made his debut in first-class cricket for Hampshire against Surrey at Kingston-upon-Thames in 1946. The following year, he was commissioned into the Royal Engineers as a second lieutenant in October 1947. He proceeded to matriculate to Magdalene College, Cambridge in 1948. While studying at Cambridge, he played first-class cricket for Cambridge University Cricket Club from 1949 to 1950, making 21 appearances; amongst these were two appearances in The University Match against Oxford University at Lord's. Described by his contemporary Oliver Popplewell as "a good all-rounder", he took 39 wickets for Cambridge at an average of 35.38; he took one five wicket haul, with figures of 6 for 100 against Gloucestershire in 1950. As a batsman, he scored 772 runs for Cambridge at an average of 28.59; he made three half centuries and one century, a score of 160 opening the batting against Worcestershire in 1949. His final appearance in first-class cricket came for Hampshire against Worcestershire at Dudley in the 1950 County Championship.

Rimell later undertook post-graduate studies in the United States at the Harvard Business School. From there, he went into business and was later director of the steel firm Firth Cleveland. Rimell died on 18 October 2007 at Sonning, Berkshire.
