= Maximillian Wood =

English cricketer

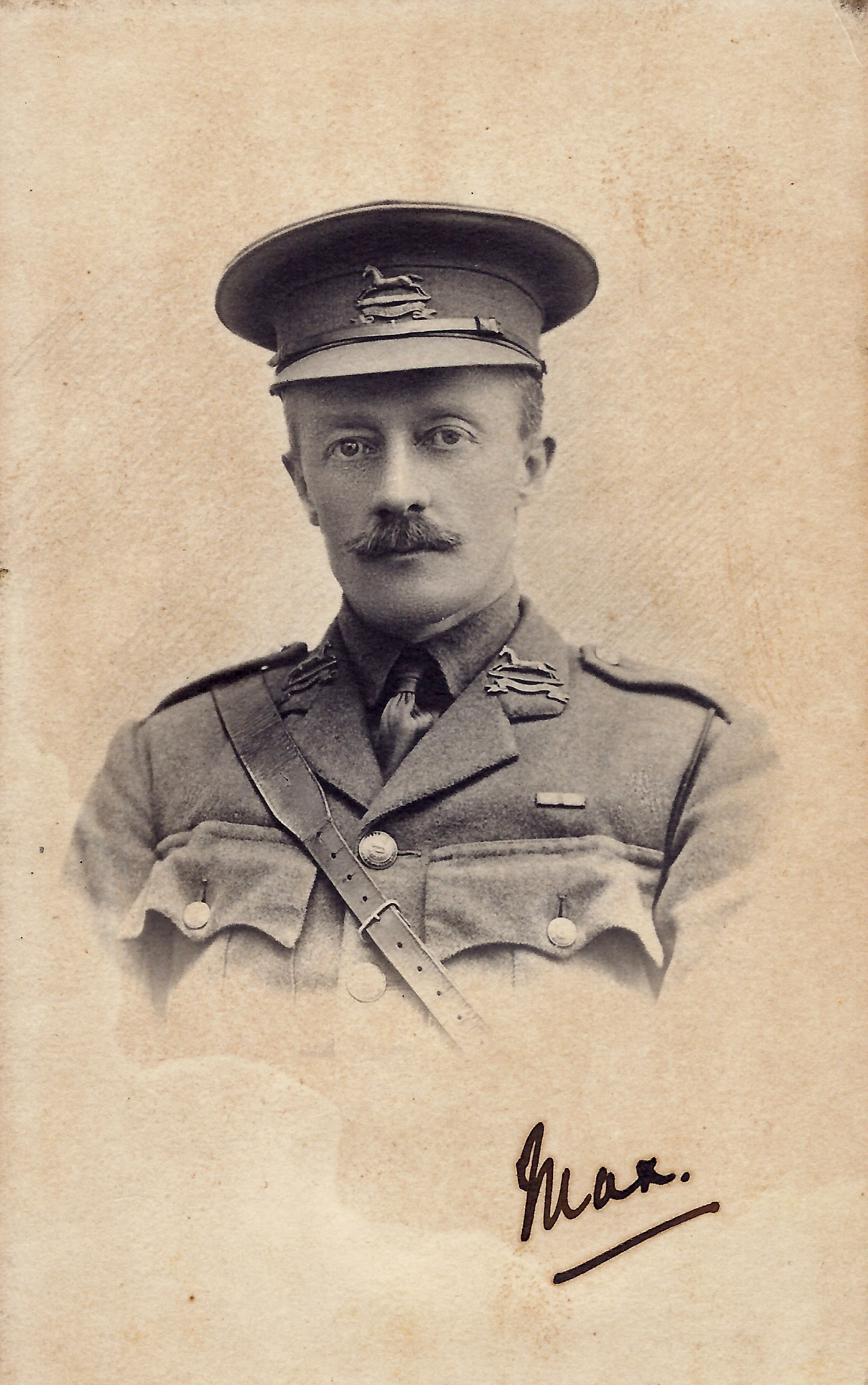

Personal information
- Full name: Maximillian David Francis Wood
- Born: 22 February 1873; Kamptee, Bombay Presidency, British India
- Died: 21 August 1915 (aged 42); Ismail Oglu Tepe, Gallipoli, Ottoman Empire
- Batting: Right-handed
- Bowling: Right-arm fast-medium

Domestic team information
- Years: Team
- 1897–1902: Europeans (India)
- 1907: Hampshire

Career statistics
Competition	First-class
Matches	10
Runs scored	196
Batting average	10.31
100s/50s	–/–
Top score	30
Balls bowled	1,049
Wickets	34
Bowling average	14.20
5 wickets in innings	1
10 wickets in match	–
Best bowling	6/51
Catches/stumpings	8/–
- Source: ESPNcricinfo, 16 January 2010

Maximillian David Francis Wood DSO (22 February 1873 – 21 August 1915) was an English first-class cricketer and British Army officer.

The son of Captain Charles Watkins Arthur Harcourt Wood and his wife, Louisa, he was born in British India at Kamptee. He was educated in England at Wellington College, where he played for the college cricket team and was considered one of the best batsman the college had produced. After completing his education, he embarked on a career in the British Army by going up to the Royal Military College, Sandhurst. He graduated from Sandhurst into the West Yorkshire Regiment as a second lieutenant in 1893, before gaining promotion to lieutenant in 1895. Wood served with the West Yorkshire Regiment in British India, where he played first-class cricket for the Europeans cricket team, making seven appearances in the Bombay Presidency Match between 1897 and 1902. In his seven matches for the Europeans, he scored 163 runs at an average of 12.53, with a highest score of 30. With his right-arm fast-medium bowling, he took 34 wickets at a bowling average of 13.26; he took one five wicket haul of 6 for 51 against the Parsees in August 1900.

Wood was appointed aide-de-camp to the Governor of Bombay, The Lord Northcote in November 1900. He was promoted to captain in March 1901. He served in the Second Boer War, for which he was decorated for his service in the war with the Queen's South Africa Medal (six clasps) and the King's South Africa Medal (two clasps). After returning to England from service in India, Wood made a single appearance in first-class cricket for Hampshire against Yorkshire at Bradford in the 1907 County Championship. He later made two further appearances in first-class cricket for H. D. G. Leveson Gower's XI in 1909 against Oxford University and Cambridge University. In the military, he was appointed an Officer in charge of a Company of Gentlemen Cadets in August 1910, with restoration to his regiment in August 1914.

Wood served in the First World War, being promoted to the rank of major in December 1914, having served as a major in a temporary capacity since October 1914. He sailed with the 9th Battalion, West Yorkshire Regiment from Liverpool in July 1915 for Moudros in preparation for the Gallipoli campaign. He was appointed a temporary lieutenant colonel on 15 August 1915, and was killed in action six days later at Ismail Oglu Tepe. His body was never recovered, with Wood being commemorated at the Helles Memorial. For his actions during the Gallipoli campaign, he was posthumously made a Companion of the Distinguished Service Order in February 1916. He was survived by his wife, Eugenie Sybil Ward, whom he had married in December 1911.
