= Frederick Gross =

English cricketer

Personal information
- Full name: Frederick Albert Gross
- Born: 17 September 1902; South Stoneham, Hampshire, England
- Died: 11 March 1975 (aged 72); Birmingham, Warwickshire, England
- Batting: Right-handed
- Bowling: Leg break googly

Domestic team information
- Years: Team
- 1924–1929: Hampshire
- 1934: Warwickshire

Career statistics
Competition	First-class
Matches	35
Runs scored	202
Batting average	7.21
100s/50s	–/–
Top score	32*
Balls bowled	3,251
Wickets	51
Bowling average	37.76
5 wickets in innings	1
10 wickets in match	–
Best bowling	5/53
Catches/stumpings	18/–
- Source: Cricinfo, 23 January 2010

Frederick Albert Gross (17 September 1902 — 11 March 1975) was an English first-class cricketer.

Gross was born in September 1902 at South Stoneham, Hampshire. He was educated at King Edward VI School, Southampton. Gross made his debut in first-class cricket for Hampshire against Sussex at Portsmouth in the 1924 County Championship. He played first-class cricket for Hampshire until 1929, making 34 appearances. In his 34 matches for Hampshire, he took 50 wickets with his leg break googly bowling, at an average of 37.00; he took one five wicket haul, with figures of 5 for 53 against Yorkshire in 1927. As a lower order batsman, he scored 202 runs with a highest score of 32 not out. He later moved to Birmingham, where he took up employment with Mitchells & Butlers. He played club cricket for the company cricket team, and in the 1934 County Championship he made a single appearance for Warwickshire against Yorkshire at Edgbaston; notably, Gross took the wicket of Len Hutton in his first County Championship innings. He died at Birmingham in March 1975.
