= Egerton Cecil =

English cricketer

Personal information
- Full name: Egerton Dodge Cooper Cecil
- Born: 4 July 1853; Worthing, Sussex, England
- Died: 25 September 1928 (aged 75); Mortlake, Surrey, England
- Batting: Right-handed
- Bowling: Unknown
- Relatives: Aubrey Cecil (brother)

Domestic team information
- Years: Team
- 1875: Hampshire

Career statistics
Competition	First-class
Matches	1
Runs scored	4
Batting average	4.00
100s/50s	–/–
Top score	4
Balls bowled	18
Wickets	0
Bowling average	–
5 wickets in innings	–
10 wickets in match	–
Best bowling	–
Catches/stumpings	–/–
- Source: Cricinfo, 7 December 2009

Egerton Dodge Cooper Cecil (4 July 1853 — 25 September 1928) was an English first-class cricketer.

The son of Moses Tearle (who changed his surname to Cecil), he was born in Worthing in July 1853. He played first-class for Hampshire in 1875, making a single appearance against Kent at Catford. Batting once in the match, he was dismissed for 4 runs by Edgar Willsher; he was absent hurt in their second innings, with Kent winning the match by an innings. In later life, Cecil joined the Civil Service with the Science and Art Department in July 1891. He later joined the Board of Education as a clerk in January 1902. Cecil died at Mortlake in September 1928. His brother, Aubrey, was also a first-class cricketer.
