= Francis Foster (cricketer, born 1848) =

English cricketer

Personal information
- Full name: Francis George Foster
- Born: 6 November 1848; Havant, Hampshire, England
- Died: 10 December 1931 (aged 83); Earl Grey, Saskatchewan, Canada
- Batting: Right-handed

Domestic team information
- Years: Team
- 1876: Hampshire

Career statistics
Competition	First-class
Matches	1
Runs scored	12
Batting average	6.00
100s/50s	–/–
Top score	10
Catches/stumpings	1/–
- Source: Cricinfo, 2 March 2010

Francis George Foster JP (6 November 1848 — 10 December 1931) was an English first-class cricketer.

Foster was born at Havant in December 1848. He made a single appearance in first-class cricket for Hampshire against Derbyshire at Southampton in 1876. Batting twice in the match, he was dismissed in Hampshire's first innings for 10 runs by William Mycroft, while in their second innings he was dismissed for 2 runs by the same bowler. Foster was a tanner in Havant, following in the footsteps of his father and grandfather. He was active in civic life, being elected to Hampshire County Council upon its foundation in April 1889. In Havant, he was chairman of both the Board of Guardians and of the Local Board, in addition to serving as a justice of the peace. Foster emigrated to Canada in later life, where he died in December 1931 at Earl Grey, Saskatchewan.
