= William Russell (cricketer) =

Australian-born English cricketer

Personal information
- Full name: William Cecil Russell
- Born: 25 April 1866; Rokewood, Victoria, Australia
- Died: 9 May 1928 (aged 62); Etchingham, Sussex, England
- Batting: Unknown

Domestic team information
- Years: Team
- 1898: Hampshire

Career statistics
Competition	First-class
Matches	1
Runs scored	7
Batting average	3.50
100s/50s	–/–
Top score	5
Catches/stumpings	–/–
- Source: Cricinfo, 20 January 2010

William Cecil Russell (25 April 1866 — 9 May 1928) was an Australian-born English first-class cricketer and barrister.

The son of Thomas Russell and his Australia wife, Louisa, he was born in Australia in April 1866 at Rokewood, Victoria. He was educated in England at Eton College, before matriculating to Trinity College, Cambridge. Russell gained membership of the Inner Temple in April 1893, being one of the 72 successful applicants from a field of 110 candidates. He was called to the bar in June 1893, where he practiced as a barrister on the South-Eastern Circuit. Russell later made a single appearance in first-class cricket for Hampshire against Yorkshire at Huddersfield in the 1898 County Championship. Batting twice in the match, he was dismissed for 2 runs in Hampshire's first innings by Ted Wainwright, while following-on in their second innings he was promoted to open the batting alongside Charles Robson (who had also been promoted to open the innings), being dismissed for 5 runs by Wilfred Rhodes. He later served in the First World War, being commissioned as a second lieutenant into the Sussex Volunteer Regiment in October 1916, having previously volunteered with the 1st Cinque Ports Rifle Volunteers and the Inns of Court Volunteer Rifles. Russell died in May 1928 at Haremere Hall near Etchingham, Sussex; he had married Eileen Ella Delamain in January 1923 at the Savoy Chapel.
