= Elisha Light =

English cricketer

Personal information
- Full name: Elisha Edward Light
- Born: 1 September 1873; Winchester, Hampshire, England
- Died: 12 March 1952 (aged 78); Llanelli, Carmarthenshire, Wales
- Batting: Left-handed
- Bowling: Slow left-arm orthodox
- Relatives: William Light (brother)

Domestic team information
- Years: Team
- 1898–1900: Hampshire
- 1907: Carmarthenshire

Career statistics
Competition	First-class
Matches	13
Runs scored	168
Batting average	10.50
100s/50s	–/–
Top score	35
Balls bowled	481
Wickets	5
Bowling average	52.60
5 wickets in innings	–
10 wickets in match	–
Best bowling	2/22
Catches/stumpings	6/–
- Source: Cricinfo, 18 January 2010

Elisha Edward Light (1 September 1873 — 12 March 1952) was an English first-class cricketer.

Light was born at Winchester in September 1873. He first played for Hampshire in second-class county cricket in 1893 and 1894. After a gap of four years, in which time Hampshire had regained their first-class status, Light trialled for Hampshire in a minor match in May 1898. In this, he took ten wickets in the match. This performance earned Light his first-class debut for Hampshire a few days later against Yorkshire at Southampton in the County Championship, with him playing first-class cricket until 1900, making thirteen appearances for Hampshire. Light took 5 wickets with his slow left-arm orthodox bowling in his thirteen first-class matches, at an average of 53.60 and with best figures of 2 for 22. As a lower order batsman, he scored 168 runs at a batting average of 10.50, with a highest score 35. He later played minor counties cricket in Wales for Carmarthenshire, making three appearances in the 1908 Minor Counties Championship. Light died at Llanelli in March 1952. His brother, William, was also a first-class cricketer.
