= Arnold Rutherford =

English cricketer

Personal information
- Full name: Arnold Page Rutherford
- Born: 2 September 1892; Highclere, Hampshire, England
- Died: 23 July 1980 (aged 87); Weybridge, Surrey, England
- Batting: Right-handed
- Bowling: Right-arm medium
- Relatives: John Rutherford (brother)

Domestic team information
- Years: Team
- 1912: Hampshire

Career statistics
| Competition | First-class |
|---|---|
| Matches | 1 |
| Runs scored | 18 |
| Batting average | 18.00 |
| 100s/50s | –/– |
| Top score | 18 |
| Balls bowled | 36 |
| Wickets | 0 |
| Bowling average | – |
| 5 wickets in innings | – |
| 10 wickets in match | – |
| Best bowling | – |
| Catches/stumpings | –/– |
- Source: Cricinfo, 6 January 2010

Arnold Page Rutherford (2 September 1892 — 23 July 1980) was an English first-class cricketer.

The son of the soldier J. A. Rutherford, he was born in July 1892 at Highclere, Hampshire. He was educated at Repton School, where he captained the school cricket team in 1911. Rutherford made a single appearance in first-class cricket for Hampshire against Cambridge University at Southampton in 1912. Batting once in the match, he was dismissed for 18 runs by Eric Kidd. Following the First World War, he was employed as an accountants clerk in Highclere. Rutherford died at Weybridge in July 1980. His elder brother, John, was also a first-class cricketer.
