= James Crowdy (cricketer) =

English cricketer (1847–1918)

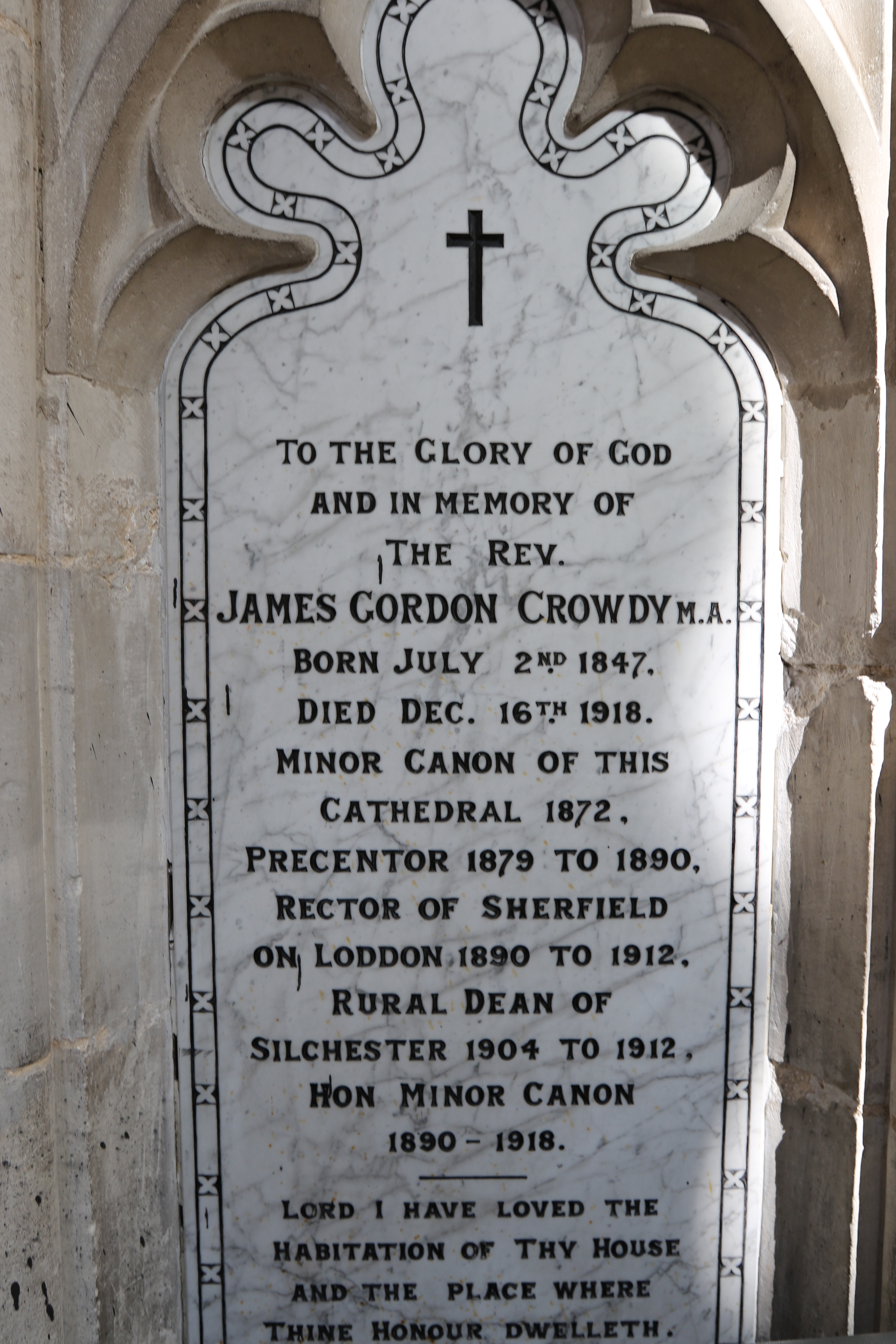

Personal information
- Full name: James Gordon Crowdy
- Born: 2 July 1847; Highworth, Wiltshire, England
- Died: 16 December 1918 (aged 71); Winchester, Hampshire, England
- Height: 5 ft 8 in (1.73 m)
- Batting: Right-handed

Domestic team information
- Years: Team
- 1872: Marylebone Cricket Club
- 1875–1884: Hampshire

Career statistics
Competition	First-class
Matches	7
Runs scored	112
Batting average	9.33
100s/50s	–/–
Top score	21
Balls bowled	28
Wickets	1
Bowling average	31.00
5 wickets in innings	–
10 wickets in match	–
Best bowling	1/31
Catches/stumpings	–/–
- Source: Cricinfo, 28 January 2010

James Gordon Crowdy (2 July 1847 – 16 December 1918) was an English first-class cricketer and clergyman.

== Life and first-class cricket ==
The son of George Frederick Crowdy, he was born in July 1847 at Highworth, Wiltshire. He was educated at Rugby School, where he played for the school cricket team. From Rugby, he matriculated to Wadham College, Oxford. After graduating from Oxford, he was appointed a minor canon at Winchester Cathedral in 1872, a post he held until 1890. In the same year as his appointment at Winchester, Crowdy made his debut in first-class cricket for the Marylebone Cricket Club against Oxford University at Oxford. He later played county cricket for Hampshire on six occasions between 1875 and 1884. In seven first-class matches, he scored 112 runs at an average of 9.33, with a highest score of 21. Commenting in Scores and Biographies, Arthur Haygarth noted that Crowdy was "a good hitter and field generally at point or cover-point".

Crowdy was later appointed rector of Sherfield on Loddon in 1890, alongside being an honorary canon and precentor at Winchester Cathedral. He held the rectorship at Sherfield until 1912. He died at Winchester in December 1918, with a memorial to him being erected on the wall inside Winchester Cathedral.
