= Walter Raynbird =

English cricketer

Personal information
- Born: 1 June 1854; Winslade, Hampshire, England
- Died: 6 May 1891 (aged 36); Winslade, Hampshire, England
- Relatives: Robert Raynbird (brother)

Domestic team information
- Years: Team
- 1880–1881: Hampshire

Career statistics
Competition	First-class
Matches	2
Runs scored	25
Batting average	8.33
100s/50s	0/0
Top score	13
Balls bowled	28
Wickets	0
Bowling average	–
5 wickets in innings	–
10 wickets in match	–
Best bowling	–
Catches/stumpings	0/–
- Source: Cricinfo, 10 January 2010

Walter Raynbird (1 June 1854 – 6 May 1891) was an English first-class cricketer.

The son of Hugh E. Raynbird, he was born in June 1854 on the Hackwood Park estate at Winslade near Basingstoke, where his father was manager for the Marquess of Winchester. Raynbird played club cricket for Basingstoke Cricket Club, most likely as a bowler. He made two appearances in first-class cricket for Hampshire, both against Sussex at Southampton and Hove in 1880 and 1881 respectively. He scored 25 runs in these two matches, with a highest score of 13. With the ball, he bowled 28 deliveries, but went wicketless.

Outside of cricket, he was the honorary secretary of the Basingstoke Sheep Fair, being succeeded in that role by his brother Robert (who was also a first-class cricketer) in 1883. He was also an auctioneer and estate agents with the family firm, Raynbird and Sons. Raynbird died in May 1891, at Home Farm on the Hackwood Park estate.
