= Bernard Brodhurst =

English cricketer

Personal information
- Full name: Bernard Maynard Lucas Brodhurst
- Born: 6 August 1873; Benares, North-Western Provinces, British India
- Died: 27 April 1915 (aged 41); Ypres, West Flanders, Belgium
- Batting: Right-handed
- Bowling: Right-arm fast-medium

Domestic team information
- Years: Team
- 1897: Hampshire

Career statistics
Competition	First-class
Matches	1
Runs scored	9
Batting average	9.00
100s/50s	–/–
Top score	9
Balls bowled	35
Wickets	0
Bowling average	–
5 wickets in innings	–
10 wickets in match	–
Best bowling	–
Catches/stumpings	1/–
- Source: ESPNcricinfo, 3 January 2010

Bernard Maynard Lucas Brodhurst (6 August 1873 — 27 April 1915) was an English first-class cricketer and British Indian Army officer.

The son of Maynard Brodhurst, a judge of the High Court of the North-Western Provinces in British India, Brodhurst was born there at Benares in April 1915. He was educated in England at Clifton College, where he played for the college cricket team. From there, he attended the Royal Military College, Sandhurst. Brodhurst graduated from there into the British Indian Army as a second lieutenant in September 1892. He spent the next year serving in India with the 2nd Battalion, Border Regiment (as part of the British Army). In January 1894, he was appointed to the 4th Gorkha Rifles and was promoted to lieutenant in December 1894. Brodhurst saw action with the regiment in the Waziristan Expedition of 1894–95. In England in 1897, he made a single appearance in first-class cricket for Hampshire against Leicestershire at Southampton in the County Championship. Batting once in the match at number eleven, he was dismissed in Hampshire's first innings for 9 runs by Francis Stocks. With his right-arm fast-medium bowling, he bowled seven wicketless overs across the match.

Brodhurst was made an adjutant of his battalion in 1900, and in that same year he served in the Boxer Rebellion in China. He was promoted to captain in September 1901, before becoming the first officer to be appointed Inspector of Signalling to the Imperial Service Troops in 1903. Brodhurst held that appointment until 1906. He was promoted to major in September 1910, and later served in the First World War. He travelled with the Gorkha Rifles to the Western Front as part of the Sirhind Brigade, arriving in France at Marseille in November 1914. Brodhurst saw action during the battles of Givenchy, Neuve Chapelle, and Ypres. It was during the Second Battle of Ypres that Brodhurst was killed in action on 27 April 1915, whilst temporarily commanding his battalion. He was buried at the La Brique Military Cemetery in Belgium.
