= Frederick Tate (cricketer) =

English cricketer

Personal information
- Full name: Frederick Tate
- Born: 6 June 1844; Lyndhurst, Hampshire, England
- Died: 24 April 1935 (aged 90); Lyndhurst, Hampshire, England
- Height: 5 ft 7 in (1.70 m)
- Batting: Right-handed
- Bowling: Right-arm roundarm fast
- Relatives: Henry Tate (brother)

Domestic team information
- Years: Team
- 1870–1876: Hampshire

Career statistics
Competition	First-class
Matches	4
Runs scored	50
Batting average	10.00
100s/50s	–/–
Top score	18*
Balls bowled	310
Wickets	13
Bowling average	11.30
5 wickets in innings	1
10 wickets in match	–
Best bowling	6/63
Catches/stumpings	5/–
- Source: Cricinfo, 2 February 2010

Frederick Tate (6 June 1844 — 24 April 1935) was an English professional first-class cricketer.

The son of Thomas Turner Tate, he was born at Lyndhurst in June 1844. Having played club cricket for both Southgate Cricket Club and Lyndhurst, he made his debut in first-class cricket for Hampshire against Lancashire at Old Trafford in 1870. On debut, he took a five wicket haul in Lancashire first innings with figures of 6 for 63. Tate played later that season against Lancashire in the return fixture at Southampton. Having spent four seasons as cricket coach for Trinity College, Cambridge, Tate began his association with Richmond Cricket Club in 1873. He returned to play two first-class matches for Hampshire in 1876, against Derbyshire and Kent. With his roundarm fast bowling, he took 13 wickets in first-class cricket at an average of 11.30. He was noted by Wisden as being "a safe field, usually in the slips or at point". In addition to playing, Tate also stood as an umpire in a single first-class match between Hampshire and Sussex at Hove in 1881. Tate died at Lyndhurst in April 1935. His brother, Henry, also played first-class cricket.
