= Adolphus Sparrow =

English cricketer (1869–1936)

Personal information
- Full name: Adolphus James Sparrow
- Born: 10 May 1869; Alverstoke, Hampshire, England
- Died: 6 September 1936 (aged 67); Minster, Kent, England

Domestic team information
- Years: Team
- 1902: Hampshire

Career statistics
Competition	First-class
Matches	1
Runs scored	1
Batting average	1.00
100s/50s	0/0
Top score	1
Catches/stumpings	0/–
- Source: Cricinfo, 26 August 2023

Adolphus James Sparrow (10 May 1869 – 6 September 1936) was an English first-class cricketer and Royal Navy sailor.

Sparrow was born in May 1869 at Alverstoke, Hampshire. Sparrow was a bandsman in the Royal Navy, serving on board HMS Immortalité at Sheerness Dockyard. He later played first-class cricket for Hampshire, making a single appearance against Leicestershire at Southampton in the 1902 County Championship. Batting once in the match, he made a single run in Hampshire's only innings from the middle order, before being dismissed by John King. Sparrow remained in Sheerness after leaving the navy, and would be resident there for thirty years. He died in hospital at Minster in September 1936.
