= Harold Denham =

English cricketer and British Army officer

Personal information
- Full name: Harold Alfred Denham
- Born: 13 October 1872; Howrah, Bengal Presidency, British India
- Died: 25 February 1946 (aged 73); Wilmington, Sussex, England
- Batting: Right-handed

Domestic team information
- Years: Team
- 1896: Hampshire

Career statistics
Competition	First-class
Matches	1
Runs scored	8
Batting average	4.00
100s/50s	–/–
Top score	7
Catches/stumpings	–/–
- Source: ESPNcricinfo, 18 January 2010

Harold Alfred Denham OBE (13 October 1872 – 25 February 1946) was an English first-class cricketer and an officer in the British Army.

Denham was born in British India at Howrah in October 1872. He later attended the Royal Military College at Sandhurst, graduating from there into the King's (Liverpool Regiment) as a second lieutenant in October 1893, with promotion to lieutenant following in July 1896. Denham made a single appearance in first-class cricket for Hampshire against Sussex at Southampton in the 1896 County Championship. Batting twice in the match, he was dismissed for a single run in Hampshire's first innings by Fred Tate, while in their second innings he was dismissed by 7 runs by the same bowler. He also later represented Ireland in a minor match against the touring South Africans at Dublin, whilst stationed there in 1900.

In the army, he was promoted to captain in March 1900, and saw active service in South Africa during the Second Boer War in 1901; he did not leave that colony until after the end of the war the following year, arriving home with the SS Walmer Castle in November 1902. He was later appointed to be an adjutant in December 1908, prior to his retirement from active service in July 1910. He returned to service in the army during the First World War, being appointed to the staff from the Reserve of Officers in September 1914; however, this appointment was cancelled the following month. Denham was made an OBE in the 1919 Birthday Honours, by which point he held the rank of major and was a temporary lieutenant colonel. He gained the full rank of lieutenant colonel in November 1919. In October 1920, he was decorated by the Kingdom of Yugoslavia with the Order of the White Eagle, 4th Class. Having exceeded the age for recall in October 1927, he was removed from the Reserve of Officers. Denham died in February 1946 at Wilmington, Sussex.
