= Charles Fynn =

English cricketer

Personal information
- Full name: Charles Garnet Fynn
- Born: 24 April 1897; Marylebone, London, England
- Died: 26 August 1976 (aged 79); Bournemouth, Dorset, England
- Batting: Right-handed
- Bowling: Leg break googly

Domestic team information
- Years: Team
- 1930–1931: Hampshire

Career statistics
Competition	First-class
Matches	9
Runs scored	45
Batting average	6.42
100s/50s	–/–
Top score	21
Balls bowled	778
Wickets	11
Bowling average	40.54
5 wickets in innings	–
10 wickets in match	–
Best bowling	3/92
Catches/stumpings	2/–
- Source: Cricinfo, 19 January 2010

Charles Garnet Fynn (24 April 1897 — 26 August 1976) was an English first-class cricketer.

Fynn was born at Marylebone in April 1897. He began his club cricket as a young fast bowler, but was wounded during the First World War and as a result he never bowled fast again. After the war he reinvented himself as a leg break googly bowler, making his debut in first-class cricket for Hampshire against Lancashire at Bournemouth in the 1930 County Championship. He took the wickets of Jack Iddon and Malcolm Taylor with his first over in first-class cricket. He played first-class cricket for Hampshire until 1931, making nine appearances. Fynn took 11 wickets in his nine matches, at an average of 40.54, with best figures of 3 for 92. As a tailend batsman, he scored 45 runs with a highest score of 21. Following his playing career, Fynn was a founder the Bournemouth Amateurs Cricket Club and played in club cricket in Bournemouth. He died at Bournemouth in August 1976.
