= Arthur McIntyre (sportsman, born 1889) =

English cricketer, rugby union player, soldier

Personal information
- Full name: Arthur Seymour McIntyre
- Born: 29 May 1889; Hartley Wintney, Hampshire, England
- Died: 14 March 1945 (aged 55); Nottingham, Nottinghamshire, England
- Batting: Right-handed
- Bowling: Unknown

Domestic team information
- Years: Team
- 1920–1923: Hampshire

Career statistics
Competition	First-class
Matches	28
Runs scored	493
Batting average	11.46
100s/50s	–/1
Top score	55
Balls bowled	48
Wickets	0
Bowling average	–
5 wickets in innings	–
10 wickets in match	–
Best bowling	–
Catches/stumpings	15/–
- Source: Cricinfo, 14 August 2010

Arthur Seymour McIntyre MC (29 May 1889 — 14 March 1945) was an English first-class cricketer, rugby union player, and British Army officer.

The son of Dr. William McIntyre, he was born in May 1889 at Hartley Wintney, Hampshire. McIntyre was commissioned into the part-time 3rd (Leicestershire Militia) Battalion, Leicestershire Regiment as a second lieutenant in October 1907. Having completed the prescribed period of training, he was transferred to the Reserve of Officers in July 1908 and was promoted to lieutenant in January 1912. During the early years of his military service, McIntyre played rugby union for the Midlands in November 1908 against Middlesex, and between 1908 and 1912 he made 46 appearances for Leicester F.C., scoring three tries.

McIntyre served with the Leicestershire Regiment during the First World War, going to the Western Front at the end of 1914 and seeing action at the Battle of Neuve Chapelle in March 1915, following which he was promoted to captain in June 1915. From the Western Front, he went to Mesopotamia as part of Major-General Aylmer's force assigned to relieve Kut. It was for actions during the relief attempt that McIntyre was awarded the Military Cross in December 1916, during actions in the Battle of Sheikh Sa'ad where he took part in an assault against an Ottoman position and was seriously wounded. Having recovered from his wounds, he was made a temporary major in November 1917, which he relinquished the following the month. In February 1918, he was appointed a brevet major. He was mentioned in dispatches for his services during the Mesopotamian campaign and in British Egypt during 1918. Following the war, McIntyre relinquished his commission in April 1920, but remained in the Special Reserve with the 3rd Battalion, Leicestershire Regiment until April 1921.

McIntyre began playing first-class cricket for Hampshire during the Bournemouth Cricket Week of 1920, making his debut against Essex in the County Championship. He played first-class cricket for Hampshire until 1923, making a total of 28 appearances. In these, he scored 493 runs at an average of 11.46, with one half century. McIntyre died at Nottingham in March 1945.
