= William Moorcroft (cricketer) =

English cricketer

Domestic team information
- Years: Team
- 1911: Hampshire

Career statistics
Competition	First-class
Matches	1
Runs scored	0
Batting average	–
100s/50s	–
Top score	–
Balls bowled	114
Wickets	0
Bowling average	–
5 wickets in innings	–
10 wickets in match	–
Best bowling	–
Catches/stumpings	0/–
- Source: Cricinfo, 10 January 2009

William Moorcroft (dates of birth and death unknown) was an English first-class cricketer.

Moorcroft was employed in Southampton by the Ordnance Survey, for whom he played club cricket for as a bowler. He made a single appearance in first-class cricket for Hampshire against Gloucestershire at Southampton in the 1911 County Championship. Moorcroft was not required to bat in the match and bowled 19 wicketless overs. He later played league cricket in Southampton for Deanery, where he was a prolific batsman and bowler. Following the First World War, he would sit on the club's committee.
