= Arthur Delmé-Radcliffe =

English cricketer and educator

Personal information
- Full name: Arthur Henry Delmé-Radcliffe
- Born: 23 November 1870; South Tidworth, Hampshire, England
- Died: 30 June 1950 (aged 79); Branksome Park, Dorset, England
- Batting: Right-handed
- Bowling: Right-arm slow

Domestic team information
- Years: Team
- 1896–1900: Hampshire
- 1897: Berkshire

Career statistics
Competition	First-class
Matches	7
Runs scored	190
Batting average	14.61
100s/50s	–/–
Top score	43
Catches/stumpings	3/–
- Source: Cricinfo, 9 December 2009

Arthur Henry Delmé-Radcliffe (23 November 1870 — 30 June 1950) was an English first-class cricketer and educator.

The son of The Reverend Henry Eliot Delmé-Radcliffe, he was born in November 1870 at South Tidworth, Hampshire. He was educated at Sherborne School, where he played for the school cricket team. From there, he matriculated to Exeter College, Oxford. He made his debut in first-class cricket for Hampshire against Leicestershire at Portsmouth in the 1896 County Championship. He played first-class cricket intermittently for Hampshire until 1900, making seven appearances. He scored 190 runs at an average of 14.61, with a highest score of 43.

Delmé-Radcliffe was involved in an unusual incident against Somerset in a second-class county match for Hampshire in 1889. Believing himself to have been stumped from the final ball of the over, he proceeded to make his way back to the pavilion, but the appeal was not upheld by the umpire. A fielder then pulled a stump out of the ground to run him out, but the umpire had called the end of the over, allowing him to continue his innings. He played minor counties cricket for Berkshire in 1897, making seven appearances in the Minor Counties Championship. Outside of cricket, he was a private schoolmaster. Delmé-Radcliffe died in June 1950 at Branksome Park, Dorset.
