= James Tuck (cricketer) =

English cricketer and umpire

Personal information
- Full name: James Jeffry Tuck
- Born: 3 June 1853; Ringwood, Hampshire, England
- Died: 20 January 1918 (aged 64); Devizes, Wiltshire, England
- Batting: Right-handed
- Bowling: Right-arm roundarm medium
- Role: Wicket-keeper

Domestic team information
- Years: Team
- 1877–1882: Hampshire

Umpiring information
- FC umpired: 90 (1886–1908)

Career statistics
Competition	First-class
Matches	9
Runs scored	176
Batting average	11.73
100s/50s	–/–
Top score	32*
Balls bowled	76
Wickets	2
Bowling average	18.00
5 wickets in innings	–
10 wickets in match	–
Best bowling	1/11
Catches/stumpings	4/–
- Source: Cricinfo, 7 February 2010

James Jeffry Tuck (3 June 1853 — 20 January 1918) was a first-class English cricketer and umpire.

Tuck was born at in June 1853 at Ringwood, Hampshire. A club cricketer for Brockenhurst Cricket Club, he made his debut in first-class for Hampshire against Kent at Southampton in 1877, with Tuck making four further first-class appearances in 1878. He would next play first-class cricket for Hampshire in 1882, when he made four appearances. In nine first-class matches, Tuck scored 173 runs at a batting average of 11.73, with a high score of 32 not out.

He later stood as an umpire in 90 first-class matches between 1886 and 1908, with the last match he stood in being the commemorative fixture played between Hambledon and an England XI at Broadhalfpenny Down. Tuck died at Devizes in January 1918.
