= Edward Ede (cricketer, born 1834) =

English cricketer

Personal information
- Full name: Edward Lee Ede
- Born: 22 February 1834; Southampton, Hampshire, England
- Died: 7 July 1908 (aged 74); Southampton, Hampshire, England
- Height: 5 ft 7 in (1.70 m)
- Batting: Right-handed
- Bowling: Right-arm underarm
- Relatives: Edward Ede junior (son); George Ede (twin brother)

Domestic team information
- Years: Team
- 1861: Hampshire (pre-county club)
- 1864–1870: Hampshire

Career statistics
| Competition | First-class |
|---|---|
| Matches | 17 |
| Runs scored | 265 |
| Batting average | 9.46 |
| 100s/50s | –/– |
| Top score | 49 |
| Balls bowled | 488 |
| Wickets | 40 |
| Bowling average | 26.66 |
| 5 wickets in innings | – |
| 10 wickets in match | – |
| Best bowling | 4/79 |
| Catches/stumpings | 6/– |
- Source: Cricinfo, 26 December 2009

Edward Lee Ede (22 February 1834 – 7 July 1908) was an English first-class cricketer and horse racing trainer.

== Early life and education ==
The son of Job Ede and his wife, Catherine, he was born alongside his twin brother, George, at Southampton in February 1834. He was educated and boarded at Abingdon School in 1851, with his brother George. His older brother Frederic boarded at Abingdon in 1840. Edward was also educated at Eton College, but did not play cricket for the college eleven. He did, however, learn to bowl while at Eton by watching William Clarke coaching the college cricket team.

== Cricket career ==
He made his debut in first-class cricket for Hampshire in 1861 against the Marylebone Cricket Club at Lord's. Two years later, he was a founding member Hampshire County Cricket Club, alongside his twin brother. The following year, he played in the club's inaugural first-class match against Sussex at Southampton in 1864, with the Hampshire side captained by his twin brother. Ede played first-class cricket for Hampshire until 1870, making sixteen appearances for the county club. Described by Wisden as "a good all-round cricketer", he scored 265 runs in his seventeen first-class matches, at an average of 9.46, with a highest score of 49. With his right-arm underarm bowling, he took 15 wickets at a bowling average of 25.46, with best figures of 4 for 79.

His association with Hampshire continued long after the end of his first-class career, with him being their honorary scorer for nearly a quarter of a century from 1882, in addition to being the editor of the Hampshire County Cricket Guide. His twin-brother was a successful horse racing jockey of his day, with Ede being well known as a horse racing trainer. He had previously served in the Hampshire Regiment of Militia Artillery, being commissioned as an ensign in December 1854. Ede died suddenly at Southampton in July 1908. His son, Edward junior, was also a first-class cricketer.
