= Edward Causton =

English cricketer

Personal information
- Full name: Edward Postle Gwyn Causton
- Born: 27 November 1876; Hammersmith, Middlesex, England
- Died: 18 April 1957 (aged 80); Torquay, Devon, England

Domestic team information
- Years: Team
- 1919: Hampshire

Career statistics
Competition	First-class
Matches	1
Runs scored	21
Batting average	21.00
100s/50s	0/0
Top score	21
Balls bowled	6
Wickets	0
Bowling average	–
5 wickets in innings	–
10 wickets in match	–
Best bowling	–
Catches/stumpings	0/–
- Source: Cricinfo, 11 April 2023

Edward Postle Gwyn Causton OBE (27 November 1876 — 18 April 1957) was an English first-class cricketer, physician, and an officer in both the Royal Navy and British Army.

The son of the physician William Henry Causton, he was born at Hammersmith in November 1876. Causton studied medicine at Emmanuel College, Cambridge and completed his medical training at St Mary's Hospital, London. He was appointed to the Royal Navy as a surgeon in November 1903, and was based on board HMS Cumberland. He was promoted to staff surgeon in November 1911, before withdrawing from his naval service in September 1913. Causton returned to military service in the First World War with the Royal Army Medical Corps, during which he was appointed a temporary captain in August 1915 and a temporary major in September 1917; he was mentioned in dispatches during his war service.

Following the war, he was made an OBE in the 1919 Birthday Honours. Causton played first-class cricket for Hampshire against Essex at Leyton in the 1919 County Championship. Batting once in the match, he was dismissed for 21 runs by George Louden. He was later a house surgeon and anaesthetist at the Royal Berkshire Hospital in Reading, Berkshire. Causton died at St. John of God Nursing Home in Torquay in April 1957.
