= Alfred Watts (cricketer) =

English cricketer

Personal information
- Full name: Alfred William Watts
- Batting: Unknown
- Bowling: Unknown

Domestic team information
- Years: Team
- 1882: Hampshire

Career statistics
Competition	First-class
Matches	2
Runs scored	26
Batting average	8.66
100s/50s	–/–
Top score	11
Balls bowled	92
Wickets	2
Bowling average	21.00
5 wickets in innings	–
10 wickets in match	–
Best bowling	1/9
Catches/stumpings	–/–
- Source: Cricinfo, 26 January 2010

Alfred William Watts (born 5 April 1859 — date of death unknown) was an English first-class cricketer.

Watts was born in April 1859 at in Millbrook, Hampshire. He made two appearances in first-class cricket for Hampshire in 1882, against Somerset at Taunton and the Marylebone Cricket Club at Southampton. In these, he scored 26 runs at an average of 8.66, in addition to taking two wickets. His date of death is not known.
