= Henry Misselbrook =

English cricketer

Personal information
- Born: 16 December 1832; Otterbourne, Hampshire, England
- Died: 11 July 1895 (aged 62); Winchester, Hampshire, England

Domestic team information
- Years: Team
- 1869: Hampshire

Career statistics
Competition	First-class
Matches	1
Runs scored	3
Batting average	1.50
100s/50s	0/0
Top score	3
Balls bowled	168
Wickets	6
Bowling average	6.50
5 wickets in innings	0
10 wickets in match	0
Best bowling	4/18
Catches/stumpings	0/–
- Source: Cricinfo, 5 January 2010

Henry Misselbrook (16 December 1832 – 11 July 1895) was an English first-class cricketer.

Misselbrook was born in December 1832 at Otterbourne, Hampshire. He played club cricket for Otterbourne Cricket Club, who he captained, whilst also being engaged as a bowler in Oxford. In Otterbourne, he was the landlord of the Cricketers' Inn. Misselbrook was involved in many important minor matches for Hampshire in the 1860s, before making a single appearance in first-class cricket for the county against the Marylebone Cricket Club (MCC) at Southampton in 1869. Opening the batting twice in the match, he was dismissed in Hampshire's first innings for 3 runs by William Marten, while in their second innings he was dismissed without scoring by the same bowler. With the ball, he took figures of 4 for 18 in the MCC first innings and took two further wickets in their second innings. Misselbrook died in Winchester in July 1895.
