= Edward Ede (cricketer, born 1881) =

English cricketer and solicitor

Personal information
- Full name: Edward Murray Charles Ede
- Born: 24 April 1881; Southampton, Hampshire, England
- Died: 23 July 1936 (aged 55); Sydney, New South Wales, Australia
- Batting: Left-handed
- Bowling: Slow left-arm orthodox
- Relatives: Edward Ede senior (father); George Ede (uncle)

Domestic team information
- Years: Team
- 1902–1906: Hampshire

Career statistics
Competition	First-class
Matches	16
Runs scored	245
Batting average	12.25
100s/50s	–/–
Top score	43
Balls bowled	1,988
Wickets	40
Bowling average	31.17
5 wickets in innings	2
10 wickets in match	1
Best bowling	7/72
Catches/stumpings	11/–
- Source: Cricinfo, 26 December 2009

Edward Murray Charles Ede (24 April 1881 – 23 July 1936) was an English first-class cricketer and solicitor.

The son of the cricketer Edward Ede senior, he was born at Southampton in April 1881. He was educated at Eton College, from where he studied law. Ede made his debut in first-class cricket for Hampshire against Leicestershire at Leicester in the 1902 County Championship. He played first-class cricket for Hampshire until 1908, making fourteen appearances. In addition to playing for Hampshire, Ede also made two further appearances in first-class cricket. The first came for the Gentlemen of England against Cambridge University in 1905, while the second came for the Hambledon Club in a commemorative first-class match against an England XI in 1908. Playing primarily as a slow left-arm orthodox bowler, he took 40 wickets in his sixteen first-class matches at an average of 31.17; he took a five wicket haul on two occasions, with best figures of 7 for 72, and took ten wickets in a match once. Ede's best season was in 1905, when he took 28 wickets. As a batsman, he scored 245 runs at a batting average of 12.25, with a highest score of 43.

Ede served in the British Army during the First World War, being commissioned as a second lieutenant in March 1915. He was subsequently posted to the South Wales Borderers and was promoted to lieutenant in February 1916, in addition to being appointed a temporary captain in the same month. In December 1916 he was transferred to the South Staffordshire Regiment, with him relinquishing his commission following the war in October 1920.

As a solicitor, Ede was charged with fraud in 1924, alongside fellow solicitor Victor Clark. At trial, they were found guilty of misappropriating £200 of their client's money and were sent to prison. Ede was subsequently struck off the Roll of Solicitors of the Supreme Court in February 1925. After completing his prison sentence, Ede immigrated to Australia where he found employment as a journalist. He died in Sydney in July 1936 from pneumonia after a fall. His uncle, George Ede, was also a first-class cricketer, and was a famous horse racing jockey.
