= Teddy Wynyard =

English sportsman and soldier (1861–1936)

Teddy Wynyard DSO OBE
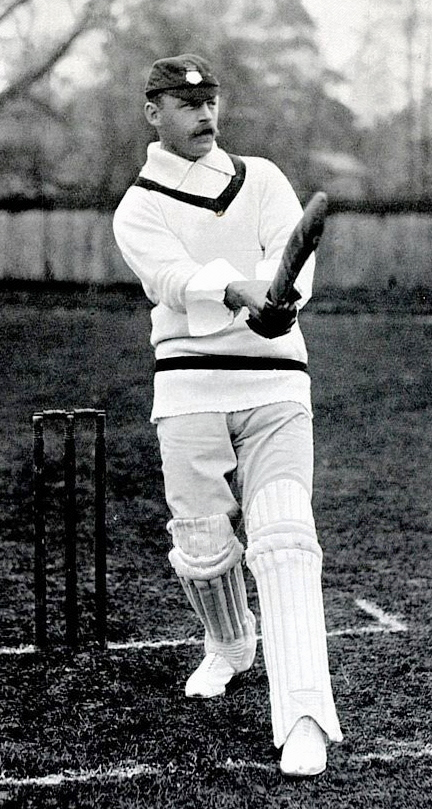
- Wynyard in about 1900

Personal information
- Full name: Edward George Wynyard
- Born: 1 April 1861; Saharanpur, North-Western Provinces, British India
- Died: 30 October 1936 (aged 75); Knotty Green, Buckinghamshire, England
- Height: 6 ft 1 in (1.85 m)
- Batting: Right-handed
- Bowling: Unknown-arm slow
- Role: Occasional wicket-keeper
- Relatives: Frank Wright (cousin)

International information
- National side: England (1896–1906)
- Test debut (cap 106): 10 August 1896 v Australia
- Last Test: 6 March 1906 v South Africa

Domestic team information
- Years: Team
- 1878–1908: Hampshire
- 1887–1912: Marylebone Cricket Club

Career statistics
Competition	Test	First-class
Matches	3	154
Runs scored	72	8,318
Batting average	12.00	33.00
100s/50s	–/–	13/42
Top score	30	268
Balls bowled	24	3,790
Wickets	0	66
Bowling average	–	32.27
5 wickets in innings	–	1
10 wickets in match	–	–
Best bowling	–	6/63
Catches/stumpings	–/–	163/5
- Source: Teddy Wynyard at Cricinfo; 6 November 2022

Edward George Wynyard DSO OBE (1 April 1861 – 30 October 1936) was an English sportsman and a career officer in the British Army. He was primarily known as a first-class cricketer who played at the domestic level predominantly for Hampshire and the Marylebone Cricket Club (MCC), in addition to playing Test cricket for England on three occasions. He made over 150 appearances in first-class cricket between 1878 and 1912, as a batsman whom Wisden described as "a splendid forcing batsman". He scored over 8,300 runs and made thirteen centuries. He was an important figure in Hampshire's return to first-class status in 1894, and shortly after their re-elevation he was engaged as both their captain and president. Wynyard's administrative duties would later see him serve on the committee of the MCC.

Wynyard was also a successful amateur football centre-forward. In 1881, he was a member of the Old Carthusians team that won the FA Cup Final, in which he scored the opening goal in a 3–0 victory over Old Etonians at The Oval. He also played for both Winchester and the Corinthians. He was adept at winter sports, participating as a tobogganist in the International Championship at Davos in Switzerland, which he won in 1894, 1895 and 1899. He also played hockey for Hampshire and was a keen golfer, forming his own club, "The Jokers".

A career soldier, Wynyard was commissioned into the Warwickshire Militia in September 1879 and later served with the King's Liverpool Regiment from May 1883. He saw action in the Burma Expedition of 1885–87, during the course of which he was awarded the Distinguished Service Order. He joined the Welsh Regiment in 1890, and in the lead-up to the Second Boer War he held a number of staff appointments and instructed at the Royal Military College. He retired from military service in 1903, but returned to active service in the First World War, initially with the Middlesex Regiment. He was seconded later in the war to the Labour Corps, where he was commandant of Thornhill Labour Camp in Thornhill, Southampton. For his role in the conflict, he was appointed an Officer of the Order of the British Empire. Wynyard was the recipient of the medal of the Royal Humane Society in 1894, for bravery at "great personal risk" when he rescued a Swiss peasant who had fallen under the ice on a lake.

== Early life ==
The son of the soldier and judge William Wynyard, Edward George Wynyard was born at Saharanpur in British India in April 1861, where his father served in the Bengal Civil Service as a judge in the High Court of Allahabad. His mother, Henrietta, died when he was eight years old. Wynyard and his siblings were recorded as living in Kensington in the 1871 census. He was educated at the Woodcote House preparatory school in Windlesham, before attending Charterhouse School from 1874 to 1877. At the time, Charterhouse had strict academic criteria which 16-year-old students had to meet in order to remain at the school after that age; Wynyard failed to meet these requirements and subsequently left Charterhouse for St Edward's School, Oxford. At St Edward's, he excelled in rugby union, where he was described as "a glorious three-quarter, fast and strong". It was speculated that, had he not pursued a military career, he might have achieved international rugby honours. In preparation for his military career, he enrolled in the fee-paying Oxford Military College.

== Military career ==
Wynyard was commissioned as a second lieutenant in the 1st Warwickshire Militia in September 1879, and promoted to lieutenant in May 1881. From the militia, he briefly served with the Middlesex Regiment before transferring to regular service with the King's Liverpool Regiment in May 1883. After just five months service with the latter, he went with the regiment to British India and saw active service in the Burma Expedition of 1885–87, winning the Distinguished Service Order (DSO) in the latter year and being twice mentioned in despatches. His DSO was gained during actions in June 1885, when a large rebel force led by Oo Temah unsuccessfully attacked a small force of the King's Liverpool Regiment and the 2nd Bengal Infantry. Following the death of their commanding officer, Captain Dunsford, during the attack, Wynyard assumed command and "boldly" led the British counterattack against the rebels, who had retreated to a fortified pagoda. His actions were praised by Generals Sir Robert Low and Sir George White. In recognition of his actions, he was appointed to command a company of the Welsh Regiment, and was awarded the Indian General Service Medal.

Wynyard was promoted to captain in March 1890, at which point he formally transferred to the Welsh Regiment. In August 1890, he was appointed an instructor in tactics, military administration and law at the Royal Military College. He was adjutant of the Oxford University Volunteers until late 1899, prior to being appointed an instructor of military engineering at Sandhurst from 26 December 1899 until August 1902, when he returned to his regiment. While in charge of cricket at the college, he arranged an officer cadets' match against W. G. Grace's XI. Two days before the game Grace wrote to say he would be unable to play, but after learning none of the cadets had seen him play, Wynyard disguised himself with make-up and false beard and played in the match with the visiting team, batting, making several runs and getting purposely hit on the hand to retire 'hurt'. He revealed his identity minus beard and cap at the teams' lunch, but no one had seen through the disguise and his realistic imitation of Grace's batting style. Wynyard retired from the army in 1903.

After the outbreak of the First World War, Wynyard was recalled in September 1914 as a temporary major with the King's Liverpool Regiment, then was attached to the Army Ordnance Corps (AOC) in May 1915. He remained with the AOC until November 1916, at which point he ceased to be employed in the corps and relinquished his temporary rank. After leaving the AOC, he was transferred to the Middlesex Regiment. He was then seconded to the Labour Corps, being made a temporary major for the appointment. He was commandant of the Thornhill Labour Camp in Thornhill, Southampton from 1916 to 1919, by which point the war had concluded. He relinquished his commission on account of ill-health in April 1919. Wynyard was appointed an Officer of the Order of the British Empire in the 1919 Birthday Honours, in recognition of his service during the war.

== Sporting career ==
=== Cricket ===
==== Early first-class career ====
Considered too young to make the cricket eleven at Charterhouse, Wynyard played for the St Edward's cricket eleven. There, it was opined by the School Chronicle that he "would do well to remedy the grave faults of being too eager to make big hits, and of getting before his wicket". Nonetheless, whilst still a schoolboy he came to the attention of Hampshire, whom he qualified to play for by means of his residence at his father's home near Hursley, Hampshire. Thus, he made his debut in first-class cricket for Hampshire at the age of 17 in 1878, against the Marylebone Cricket Club (MCC) at Lord's. In 1879, he captained St Edward's to fifteen victories and only one defeat from nineteen matches, and headed both the batting and bowling averages; the School Chronicle declared that he was "by far the best all round cricketer that has ever been at St Edward's". He made three further first-class appearances for Hampshire in 1880, playing twice more against the MCC and once against Sussex, before playing against Sussex in 1881.

Opportunities to play for Hampshire during his early years were restricted by his military service. He made four appearances in 1883, during which he made his first half-century against Surrey at The Oval, top-scoring in Hampshire's first innings with 61. Thereafter, his military duties took him to British India, where he remained until 1887, and where he took part in non-first-class matches. During one match in India at Nainital in 1885, he made scores of 123 and 106 for a team named The Visitors against The Residents. In another for his regiment in 1887, he made 237 against the 23rd Battalion, Royal Fusiliers. With his presence in the regimental team, it is believed they only lost one match between 1883 and 1890, with Wynyard averaging around 100 runs per innings. He would later play down his batting feats in India in an 1896 interview, in which he attributed his success to "generally very easy [bowling]".

By the time he had returned home later in 1887, Hampshire had lost their first-class status two years prior, following a number of poor seasons. Following his return, he played two first-class matches for the MCC in 1887, in addition to making 233 in a minor match in the same year for Incogniti against Phoenix Park at Dublin. Further first-class appearances came for the MCC in 1888, and A. J. Webbe's XI and the Gentlemen of England (both 1890). He continued to play for Hampshire at second-class level from 1887 to 1894. In 1893, he averaged 50 across the season, leading to his selection for the Second Class Counties combined team against the touring Australians at Edgbaston, while in 1894 he notably scored three successive centuries for Hampshire. The latter was his most successful season to date, scoring 465 runs at an average of 66.43, despite only playing from August onwards. Prior to his arrival in August, four second-class counties (Derbyshire, Essex, Leicestershire and Warwickshire) were earmarked for elevation to first-class status for the 1895 season, but Hampshire were initially overlooked. Wynyard's good form contributed to a change of heart, with Hampshire added to the elevated list in October 1894.

==== Hampshire's return to first-class cricket ====
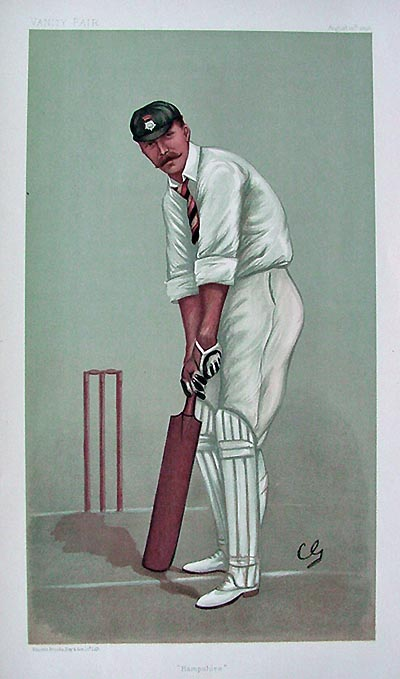
Wynyard as caricatured by F. C. Gould in Vanity Fair, August 1898

Following confirmation of Hampshire's re-elevation to first-class status and their admittance into the County Championship, Wynyard was elected Hampshire president in December 1894. He had a modest 1895 season, scoring 581 runs from thirteen matches, and although he passed double-figures in 19 of his 26 innings, he averaged 22.34. During this season, he also played for I Zingari in their jubilee match against the Gentlemen of England at Lord's. Wynyard was appointed Hampshire captain prior to the 1896 season, succeeding Russell Bencraft who had opted to retire from the role; thus he was both captain and president for the forthcoming season. He was prolific in 1896, beginning the season by scoring his maiden first-class century (121 runs) playing for Charles Thornton's personal team against Cambridge University. Later in the season, he made a century against Sussex, and in the match which followed he made 268 runs in a total of 515 against Yorkshire; at the time, this was the highest individual first-class score for Hampshire. He finished the season with 1,038 runs at an average of 49.42, with his average for the season being second only to Ranjitsinhji. His good form led to him being selected to play for England against Australia at The Oval in the Third Test of Australia's tour of England; he made scores of 10 and 3 as England clinched the deciding Test match of the series.

His 1897 season was less productive, with 713 runs from twelve matches at an average of 32.40, though he made centuries. Early in the season, he featured for the Gentlemen in the prestigious Gentlemen v Players fixture, making two scores of 33. Despite a more modest season, he was still in contention for the 1897–98 tour of Australia, but declined a place on the tour due to his concurrent military duties. His commitment to military cricket in 1898 drew criticism from some at Hampshire, who were frustrated that he frequently missed Hampshire matches while still captain, in order to play army cricket. Indeed, this had been alluded to by the Hampshire committee in 1897, who had noted that both Wynyard and fellow soldier Francis Quinton had been missing Hampshire matches to play in local matches. He made just three appearances for the county in the 1898 County Championship, playing more first-class matches for teams besides Hampshire during the season. His one century in 1898 came in a Championship match against Leicestershire, making a quick 140 in just under three hours of play, contributing to a 145-runs victory for Hampshire. Wynyard was featured in a caricature in Vanity Fair in 1898, with the caption to his caricature alluding to his reputed short and sometimes violent temper, whilst also mentioning his dispute with Ranjitsinhji, which had begun when Ranjitsinhji helped himself to some of Wynyard's grapes.

In 1899, he featured more regularly for Hampshire, making twelve of his eighteen first-class appearances that season for the county. Wynyard had a successful full-time return to the Hampshire team, passing 1,000 first-class runs for the second time, and was well complemented by a fellow army cricketer Robert Poore, who headed the national averages. The pair added 411 runs for the sixth wicket against Somerset at Taunton. Wynyard contributed 225 runs to the partnership, while Poore eventually made 304, surpassing Wynyard's individual high score for Hampshire that he had made in 1896. This would remain the highest Hampshire partnership for any wicket for over a century, until it was surpassed by the partnership of 523 by Michael Carberry and Neil McKenzie in 2011; however, as of 2026 their partnership remains a Hampshire record for the sixth wicket. As captain, he was also inclined to bowl himself during this season, taking 27 wickets at a bowling average of 27.27; he notably claimed his only five wicket haul in 1899, taking 6 for 63 against Leicestershire with his underarm lob bowling.

With the outbreak of the Second Boer War in October 1899, Wynyard felt compelled to resign the Hampshire captaincy in November 1899 to focus on his military duties. His army commitments limited him to just three first-class appearances for Hampshire in the 1900 County Championship, in addition to playing in the North v South fixture, where he made 85 runs for the South in their first innings. In 1901 he made just two appearances for Hampshire and one for the MCC against Yorkshire, while in 1902 he did not play any first-class cricket. He returned to first-class cricket in 1903, playing four times early in the season for the MCC without much success, before making three appearances in August for Hampshire in the County Championship, scoring half-centuries against Essex and Somerset. His retirement from the army in 1903 enabled him to dedicate more time to playing cricket, and he made eleven first-class appearances in 1904. Only two of these came for Hampshire, with the majority of the remainder coming for the MCC, which Wynyard assisted in running at Lord's. Later in the season, he played for I Zingari and made 147, which was to become the highest individual first-class score for the team; his innings was pivotal in helping I Zingari to a six wicket victory, chasing 412 runs in their second innings.

==== Return to Test cricket ====
During the winter which followed the 1904 season, Wynyard toured the West Indies with Lord Brackley's personal team, making eight first-class appearances during the tour. The pitches in the West Indies suited his playing style, with Wynyard heading the team's batting averages. His most notable innings on the tour came against Jamaica, against whom he made 157 to inflict a heavy innings and 169-runs defeat on the Jamaicans. As in previous seasons, the majority of his first-class appearances during the 1905 English season came for the MCC, the highlight of which was a century opening the batting against Cambridge University at Lord's. He also featured in three matches for Hampshire in the 1905 County Championship, with his overall season return being 583 runs at an average of 34.29. This form led to his selection to tour South Africa with the MCC, captained by Plum Warner, in the winter which followed the 1905 season. During the tour, he struggled against the leg spin of Reggie Schwarz and Bert Vogler, averaging under 20 runs per innings in the six first-class matches that he played, passing fifty just once; however, he earned selection for the first two Test matches of the series played at the Old Wanderers. These were to be Wynyard's final Test matches, ending his Test career with 72 runs and a highest score of 30.

Thereafter, he made just three further first-class appearances for Hampshire, playing twice in the 1906 County Championship and once in the 1908 County Championship, which brought his total first-class appearances for Hampshire since his 1878 debut to 71 matches. In these, he scored 4,322 runs at an average of 34.57, making seven centuries and 22 half-centuries. Though the frequency with which he played for Hampshire reduced, Wynyard still featured extensively for the MCC both domestically and on tours. During the winter of 1906, he captained the MCC on their tour to New Zealand, where he made two first-class appearances against Auckland and Wellington. However, against Wellington he snapped a tendon in his leg and was forced to return home. The injury he sustained in New Zealand further curtailed his first-class cricket, with him making just four first-class appearances for the MCC in 1907. Two of these came on their tour to North America against the Gentlemen of Philadelphia, where he struggled against the bowling of Bart King and H. V. Hordern. Nonetheless, he was offered the England captaincy for their 1907–08 tour of Australia, but declined the invitation for family reasons.

Wynyard was recruited by the South African Cricket Association in January 1908 as their representative in England for that year. In 1908, he played for a Hambledon XII in a commemorative first-class match against an England XI at Broadhalfpenny Down, scoring a half-century in the match. In the winter he toured Egypt with the MCC, though the tour featured no first-class matches. After appearing as a guest in Ireland for Stanley Cochrane's personal team against the touring Australians in 1908, Wynyard toured South Africa in early 1910 with an MCC side captained by H. D. G. Leveson-Gower, making four first-class appearances against South African provincial sides, which reflected his utilisation as a reserve player on the tour. Wynyard played his final two first-class matches for the MCC against Oxford University in 1910 and 1912, with both matches being played at Lord's; thus, his first-class career came to an end at the same venue at which it began 34 years earlier. His association with the MCC encompassed 49 first-class appearances, scoring 1,878 runs at an average of 26.82.

Between 1878 and 1912, he played in 154 first-class matches. He was described by Wisden as "a splendid forcing batsman", and "a fine, free hitter" who "used a great variety of strokes, especially those in front of the wicket". He also developed a special method of hitting left-handed bowling over cover point. In his 154 matches, he scored 8,318 runs at an average of exactly 33; he made thirteen centuries and 42 half-centuries. As a bowler, he took 66 wickets at a bowling average of 32.27, and by the end of his first-class career he was one of the last proponents of lob-bowling. He was a versatile fielder, who fielded predominantly in the slips, though could also field at mid-on and as a wicket-keeper. He was Hampshire's regular wicket-keeper during the 1890 season.

==== Later cricket ====
Shortly before the First World War, Wynyard became president of Charterhouse School's Cricket and Football Club in 1913, an appointment he would hold until 1919. Following his wartime service, he continued to play an active part in cricket, both in a playing and administrative capacity. He toured North America with Incogniti in 1920, though he featured in just one match on the tour. At the age of 62, he captained the Free Foresters on their 1923 tour of Canada, but again featured in only a couple of matches. He served on the committee of the MCC between 1920 and 1924. During the 1920s, he played club cricket in Buckinghamshire for Beaconsfield Cricket Club, who he captained in 1924.

=== Football ===
Wynyard was in the school association football XI at Charterhouse in 1876, which was the same year that the school aligned its football rules to the rules of football established by The Football Association. During the final year of his education at Charterhouse, he played for Winchester, who were captained by Henry Bayard Rich. In 1881, he played for the Old Carthusians old boys' club as a centre-forward in the 1880–81 FA Cup, playing in the semi-final against Darwen, which led to an unexpected victory for the Old Carthusians. He also played in the final at Kennington Oval on 9 April. Around 25 minutes into the match, Wynyard scored his team's first goal in a 3–0 win against the Old Etonians. In the same season, he received an invitation to play for England against Ireland, but had to decline.

He later played twice for the Corinthians in 1893, scoring five goals. He also appeared in representative matches for London, and captained Hampshire. C. W. Alcock described him as "a heavy forward, charging and dribbling well; always middles splendidly" and "good forward, plenty of dash; makes himself obnoxious to the opposing backs". Baily's Monthly Magazine of Sports and Pastimes proffered that he was "one of the most brilliant of amateurs".

=== Other sports ===
Wynyard competed in winter sports. He won the European International Toboggan Championship at Davos in Switzerland in 1894, 1895 and 1899. It was while competing in the 1893 event that he rescued a peasant from drowning in a lake on 9 December, when she had become drawn under the ice following a mountain torrent; his actions earned him the medal of the Royal Humane Society in 1894, for bravery at "great personal risk". He was also a competent figure skater, passing one of the National Ice Skating Association's figure skating tests.

He played county hockey for Hampshire and later took up golf, forming his own club, "The Jokers", which was drawn largely from distinguished cricketers of which he was "Chief Joker"; he played for "The Jokers" into the 1930s. Other clubs he joined were Beaconsfield, Royal Wimbledon (of whom he was an elected honorary member) and Oxford Graduates' Golfing Society. During his military service, he was a member of the regimental polo team.

== Death ==
Wynyard died at his home, The Red House, at Knotty Green near Beaconsfield on 30 October 1936, aged 75, and was buried in the churchyard at Penn, Buckinghamshire. Amongst the mourners at his funeral were his contemporaries Reymond de Montmorency, William Findlay, Kenneth Goldie, J. T. Hearne, H. D. G. Leveson-Gower, Evelyn Metcalfe, William Sarel, and Plum Warner. Warner also represented the MCC, with I Zingari being represented by Ronnie Aird. The England footballer Arthur Melmoth Walters also attended, as did notable figures from the British armed services and the aristocracy. Wynyard was survived by his wife, Sarah, whom he married in 1914, and their only child, a son who was also called Edward.

== Works cited ==
- Bancroft, James W. (2021). The Early Years of the FA Cup: How the British Army Helped Establish the World's First Football Tournament. Barnsley: Pen and Sword Books. ISBN 9781399099943.
- Curry, Graham (2019). The Early Development of Football: Contemporary Debates. Abingdon-on-Thames: Taylor & Francis. ISBN 9781000021707.
- Girdlestone, Frederick Kennedy Wilson; Hardman, Edward Trevor; Tod, Alexander Hay (1911). Charterhouse Register, 1872-1910. Vol. 1. London: Chiswick Press. OCLC 926287944.
- Haygarth, Arthur (1895). Scores and Biographies. Vol. 14. London: Longmans & Co.
- Humphris, Edith M.; Creagh, Sir O'Moore (1924). The V. C. and D. S. O. Vol. 2. London: Standard Art Book Company Limited. OCLC 749126130.
- Sweetman, Simon (2012). H. V. Hesketh-Prichard: Amazing Stories. Cardiff: ACS. ISBN 9781908165213.
- Warsop, Keith (2004a). E. G. Wynyard: His Record Innings-by-Innings. Nottingham: ACS. ISBN 1902171853.
- Warsop, Keith (2004b). The Early FA Cup Finals and the Southern Amateurs. Nottingham: SoccerData. ISBN 1899468781.

Sporting positions
Preceded by Russell Bencraft	Hampshire cricket captain 1896–1899	Succeeded by Charles Robson
