= List of Hampshire cricket captains =

The following 32 first-class cricketers have been appointed as Hampshire County Cricket Club as club captain since 1864.

No.	Name	Nationality	Years	First	Last	FC	LA	T20	Total	Refs
1	George Ede	England	1864–1869	7 July 1864	11 July 1864	2	–	–	2	
2	Clement Booth	England	1875–1878	7 July 1864	11 July 1864	2	–	–	2	

- (England) Clement Booth 1875–1878
- (England) Arthur Wood 1879
- (England) Sir Russell Bencraft 1880–1882
- (England) Arthur Wood 1883–1885
- (England) Sir Francis Lacey 1888–1889
- (England) Sir Russell Bencraft 1895
- (England) Teddy Wynyard 1896–1899
- (England) Charles Robson 1900–1902
- (Scotland) Edward Sprot 1903–1914
- (England) Lionel Hallam Tennyson 1919–1932
- (England) Ronnie Aird 1931
- (England) Giles Baring 1931
- (England) Stephen Fry 1931
- (England) Phil Mead 1931
- (England) Geoffrey Lowndes 1934–1935
- (England) Dick Moore 1936–1937
- (England) Cecil Paris 1938
- (England) George Taylor 1939
- (England) Desmond Eagar 1946–1957
- (England) Colin Ingleby-Mackenzie 1958–1965
- (Cricket West Indies) Roy Marshall 1966–1970
- (England) Richard Gilliat 1971–1978
- (England) Bob Stephenson 1979
- (England) Nick Pocock 1980–1984
- (England) Mark Nicholas 1985–1995
- (England) John Stephenson 1996–1997
- (England) Robin Smith 1998–2002
- (England) John Crawley 2003
- (Australia) Shane Warne 2004–2007
- (England) Dimitri Mascarenhas 2008–2009
- (England) Dominic Cork 2010–2011
- (England) Jimmy Adams 2012–2015
- (England) James Vince 2015 to date
- (England) Will Smith 2016
- (Australia) George Bailey 2017
- (South Africa) Kyle Abbott 2018–2021
- (England) Sam Northeast 2019–2020
- (England) Felix Organ 2022
