= Ernest Read (cricketer) =

English cricketer

Personal information
- Full name: Ernest George Read
- Born: 8 October 1873; Portsmouth, Hampshire, England
- Died: 21 March 1921 (aged 47); Wandsworth, London, England
- Batting: Right-handed
- Role: Wicket-keeper
- Relatives: Russell Bencraft (uncle)

Domestic team information
- Years: Team
- 1903: Hampshire
- 1904–1906: Sussex

Career statistics
Competition	First-class
Matches	7
Runs scored	113
Batting average	10.27
100s/50s	–/–
Top score	44
Catches/stumpings	7/–
- Source: Cricinfo, 13 February 2010

Ernest George Read (8 October 1873 – 21 March 1921) was an English first-class cricketer.

Read was born at Portsmouth in October 1873 and was educated in Oxford at St Edward's School. Although born in Hampshire, he was resident in Sussex and played club cricket in the county for Worthing and Heathfield, scoring heavily for both clubs. By virtue of being born in Hampshire, Read made three appearances in first-class cricket for Hampshire in the 1903 County Championship. The following season, through his residency in Sussex, Read played first-class cricket for Sussex, making two appearances in 1904 against Cambridge University and Oxford University, before making two further appearances in 1906 against Oxford University and Middlesex in the County Championship. Playing as an occasional wicket-keeper in first-class cricket, he scored 113 runs in his seven matches at an average of 10.27, with a highest score of 10.27. As a fielder, he took 7 catches. Read died at Wandsworth in March 1921. His uncle, Russell Bencraft, was also a first-class cricketer.
