= Ronnie Aird =

English cricketer and administrator

Personal information
- Full name: Ronald Aird
- Born: 4 May 1902; Paddington, London, England
- Died: 16 August 1986 (aged 84); Yapton, Sussex, England
- Batting: Right-handed
- Bowling: Right-arm medium

Domestic team information
- Years: Team
- 1920–1938: Hampshire
- 1923: Cambridge University
- 1927–1939: Marylebone Cricket Club

Career statistics
Competition	First-class
Matches	136
Runs scored	4,482
Batting average	21.97
100s/50s	4/14
Top score	159
Balls bowled	526
Wickets	7
Bowling average	59.00
5 wickets in innings	–
10 wickets in match	–
Best bowling	2/35
Catches/stumpings	52/–
- Source: Cricinfo, 22 September 2009

Ronald Aird MC (4 May 1902 – 16 August 1986) was an English first-class cricketer, cricket administrator and British Army officer. Aird began his first-class cricket career with Hampshire County Cricket Club in 1920, making over 100 appearances for the county in which he scored over 3,600 runs. After also playing first-class cricket for Cambridge University Cricket Club while studying at Clare College, Aird was appointed assistant secretary of the Marylebone Cricket Club (MCC) in 1926, which restricted his appearances in first-class cricket thereafter. He served as assistant secretary under William Findlay and Rowan Rait Kerr, and was himself elected secretary following Kerr's retirement in 1952. Aird remained in the post until 1962 and became MCC president in 1968, the year in which he chaired the special general meeting of the MCC over relations with South Africa during the D'Oliveira affair. He was president of Hampshire County Cricket Club from 1971 to 1983. Outside of cricket, Aird served in the Second World War with the Royal Armoured Corps and was decorated with the Military Cross.

== Early life and cricket career ==
The son of Malcolm Rucker Aird, who was the son of Sir John Aird, he was born at Paddington in May 1902. He was educated at Eton College, where he played for the college cricket team in the Eton v Winchester matches. He was also active in rackets at Eton, reaching the pairs final at Queen's Club twice. During his final two years at Eton in 1920 and 1921, Aird trialled for Hampshire, making his debut in first-class cricket against Warwickshire at Portsmouth. From Eton, he matriculated to Clare College, Cambridge. Despite featuring for Hampshire regularly in the 1922 County Championship, it was not until 1923 that he played first-class cricket for Cambridge University Cricket Club, having not been in the running for selection in 1922. He gained a blue in 1923, a season in which he made 12 appearances for the university, largely due to his performance against Yorkshire, when he scored 64 against a strong bowling line-up containing George Macaulay, Wilfred Rhodes, Emmott Robinson and Abe Waddington.

For Hampshire, it took him time to acclimatise to the level of first-class cricket, but he soon became a regular member of the Hampshire side. In 1924, he played his only full season of county cricket, making 28 appearances and passing 1,000 runs for the season for the only time, while also scoring his maiden first-class century. He played first-class cricket for Hampshire until 1938, making 108 appearances for the county. He was known, on occasion, to deputise as captain for Lionel Tennyson, doing so for matches in 1924, 1926 and 1931. Aird scored 3,603 runs for Hampshire at an average of 22.24; he made four centuries and ten half centuries. His highest score of 159 came against Leicestershire in 1929, in a total of 272. A capable fielder, he took over 50 catches in first-class cricket.

Aird began his association with the Marylebone Cricket Club (MCC) when he was appointed assistant secretary in 1926, with William Findlay succeeding Francis Lacey as MCC secretary in the same year. He also played first-class cricket for the MCC from 1927 to 1939, making fifteen appearances and scoring 520 runs at an average of exactly 26. His administrative duties with the MCC had the effect of greatly reducing his appearances for Hampshire, so much so that after the 1926 season he never made more than seven appearances for the county in a given season. Aird maintained his role as assistant secretary in 1936, when Findlay was succeeded as secretary by Rowan Rait Kerr. In addition to playing first-class cricket for Hampshire and the MCC, Aird also played for the Gentlemen in the Gentlemen v Players fixture of 1925.

== War service and cricket administration ==
Aird served in the British Army during the Second World War, being commissioned as a lieutenant into the Royal Armoured Corps in August 1939, a day before the outbreak of hostilities. He saw action during the North African campaign and was wounded several times, once severely. He had been the sole survivor of a destroyed tank on two occasions. He was awarded the Military Cross in November 1942. He remained in the military following the war, transferring to the 4th County of London Yeomanry. He was conferred the Territorial Decoration in April 1951, at which point he held the rank of captain. He exceeded the age limit for liability to recall in August 1952, at which point he ceased to belong to the Reserve of Officers, but was allowed to retain his honorary rank of major.

Following the war, he continued to assist Rait-Kerr, until he succeeded him as MCC secretary in 1952. A year into the post, he gave permission for the BBC to broadcast live coverage of the deciding Test of the 1953 Ashes Series, due to 'enormous public interest' as England sought to win back The Ashes for the first time in 19 years. The remainder of his secretaryship was summarised by Wisden as one absent of any startling reforms or innovations. He retired in 1962, being succeeded as secretary by Billy Griffith. Although known as a man who was imperturbable, he gained admiration from his peers during his presidency of the MCC in 1968, when he chaired the heated special general meeting over relations with South Africa in light of the D'Oliveira affair, which led to the cancellation of England's tour of South Africa. He praised D'Oliveria for the great dignity that he had maintained throughout the affair. He was elected a trustee of the MCC in 1971, a position he held until his appointment as a life vice-president in 1983. In addition to his administrative roles within the MCC over a sixty-year period, Aird was also an administrator in county cricket; he served as president of Hampshire County Cricket Club between 1971 and 1983, being succeeded by Cecil Paris. He was also involved with I Zingari for over fifty years, as secretary and treasurer, helping raise the club from the low esteem with which it had fallen to in the 1920s, to a club whose membership again became popular.

== Personal life and death ==
Outside of cricket, Aird competed at Lord's in real tennis, winning the silver racket six times between 1933 and 1949, though he never won the gold racket, being defeated twice by Baron Aberdare and four times by W. D. Macpherson. In retirement, he moved to the Sussex village of Yapton, where he was resident at West Down House. His move there bought him close to nearby Arundel, with Aird becoming associated with the Friends of Arundel Castle Cricket Ground, to whom he provided much wisdom and experience. In his latter years, Aird struggled with illness and died at Yapton in August 1986, aged 84.
