= Francis Lacey =

English cricketer (1859–1946)

Sir Francis Lacey
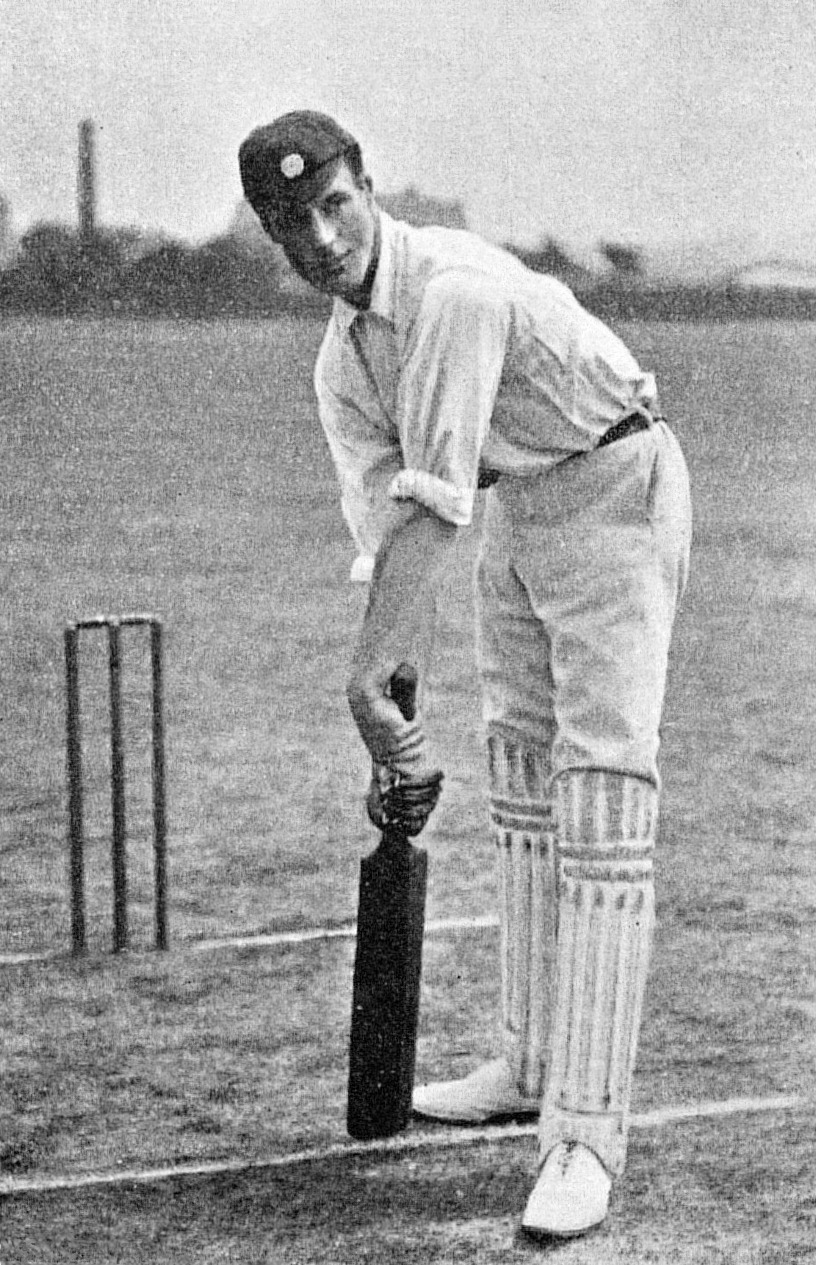

Personal information
- Full name: Francis Eden Lacey
- Born: 19 October 1859; Wareham, Dorset, England
- Died: 26 May 1946 (aged 86); Sutton Veny, Wiltshire, England
- Batting: Right-handed
- Bowling: Right-arm roundarm slow

Domestic team information
- Years: Team
- 1880–1897: Hampshire
- 1882: Cambridge University
- 1887–1896: Marylebone Cricket Club

Career statistics
Competition	First-class
Matches	50
Runs scored	2,589
Batting average	32.77
100s/50s	4/12
Top score	211
Balls bowled	2,234
Wickets	52
Bowling average	21.59
5 wickets in innings	3
10 wickets in match	1
Best bowling	7/149
Catches/stumpings	34/–
- Source: Cricinfo, 14 January 2023

Sir Francis Eden Lacey (19 October 1859 — 26 May 1946) was an English cricketer, cricket administrator and barrister. Lacey played first-class cricket for Hampshire from 1880 to 1896, either side of the club losing its first-class status between 1886 and 1894; it was during this period that he captained Hampshire in 1888 and 1889. A prolific batsman for Hampshire, he scored over 2,000 runs for the county in 33 first-class appearances, which included a double century against Kent in 1884. As a roundarm slow bowler, he also took 45 wickets for Hampshire, including three five wicket hauls. He made additional appearances in first-class cricket for Cambridge University and the Marylebone Cricket Club (MCC), amongst others. In a minor fixture against Norfolk he made 323 runs, which remains the highest individual score in second-class county cricket.

A barrister by profession, Lacey was a member of the Inner Temple who was called to the bar in 1889. It was his profession as a barrister that set him in good stead when he was appointed secretary of the MCC in 1898, setting in motion a number of reforms. He was instrumental in the formation of the Imperial Cricket Conference in 1909, the forerunner of the International Cricket Council, which set in motion the global governance of the game. He remained secretary of the MCC until 1926, and following his retirement he later served as president of both Hampshire County Cricket Club and Wiltshire County Cricket Club. He was awarded a knighthood for his services to cricket in the 1926 Birthday Honours list, becoming the first person to be knighted for services to any sport.

== Early life and education ==
The youngest son of William Lacey, he was born in October 1859 at Wareham, Dorset. He got his early education at Sherborne School, where he captained the school in both cricket and football. In cricket, he scored six successive centuries for the school in his final year. From there, he matriculated in 1878 to Gonville and Caius College, Cambridge. He graduated from Cambridge with a Bachelor of Arts in 1882.

== Cricket ==
=== Playing career ===
While studying at Cambridge, Lacey made his debut in first-class cricket for Hampshire against Sussex at Hove in 1880. He appeared for Hampshire during the summer break from university in 1881 and 1882, in addition playing first-class cricket for Cambridge University Cricket Club three times in 1882, including in The University Match against Oxford University at Lord's. He gained his cricket blue in cricket in 1882, in addition to gaining a blue in football the previous year. After graduating from Cambridge, he continued to play county cricket for Hampshire until the club lost its first-class status following the 1885 season. During this period, Lacey made two first-class appearances for teams besides Hampshire; in 1884 he appeared for a Cambridge University Past and Present cricket team against the touring Australians at Hove and in 1885 he played for A. J. Webbe's XI against Cambridge University at Fenner's. Prior to the loss of their first-class status, Lacey scored three centuries. The first, a score of 157 came in 1882 against Sussex, while his next two centuries came in 1884, scores of 100 against Somerset and 211 against Kent, a match in which he also made an unbeaten 92.

Despite the loss of their first-class status, Lacey continued his association with Hampshire. He was club captain from 1888 to 1894, succeeding Arthur Wood. In 1887, in a minor match against Norfolk at Southampton, Lacey made 323 not out, which remains as of 2026 the highest individual score in a second-class fixture in England. At the time, it was the fifth-highest score in an inter-county match. Although Hampshire had lost their first-class status, Lacey continued to play in first-class matches for the Marylebone Cricket Club (MCC), debut for them in 1887 against Derbyshire; in that same year, he also played for the 'wandering' cricket club I Zingari in a first-class fixture against the Gentlemen of England at the Scarborough Festival. In 1890, he played for an Oxford and Cambridge Universities Past and Present cricket team against the touring Australians in 1890 and for the Gentlemen in the Gentlemen v Players fixture of 1892. Hampshire regained first-class status in 1894, with Russell Bencraft succeeding Lacey as captain. The following season, when Hampshire were admitted to the County Championship, Lacey resumed his first-class career with the county. He played for Hampshire until 1897, having made 33 appearances for the county in first-class cricket. Described by Wisden as a "stylish bat, hitting with plenty of power especially in front of the wicket", he scored 2,028 runs for Hampshire in first-class matches at an average of 39.76, making four centuries and ten half centuries. As a roundarm slow bowler, he was described by Wisden as bowling with deceptive flight. For Hampshire, he took 45 wickets at a bowling average of 20.93 and took a five wicket haul on three occasions, with best figures of 7 for 149.

=== Administrator ===
With the end of his first-class playing career in 1897, Lacey was nominated by Spencer Ponsonby-Fane to succeed the retiring Henry Perkins as MCC secretary, being appointed in 1898. Upon becoming secretary, he instilled a business-based approach to the running of the MCC, which was in contrast to Perkins' easy-going approach. Amongst his reforms were the remodelling of the MCC subcommittees and putting the business of the club on a more formal basis. Under his leadership, the MCC formed the Advisory County Cricket Committee, the predecessor to the Test and County Cricket Board, which was designed to bring together representatives of the first-class counties and the minor counties under the chairmanship of the MCC president. In June 1909, he was instrumental in the foundation of the Imperial Cricket Council, which had been the idea of the South African Abe Bailey and bought together the governing bodies of cricket in Australia and South Africa to form a global governing body. At the start of the First World War, Lacey issued a statement to confirm the cessation of cricket during the conflict and the placing of Lord's at the disposal of the War Office. In 1922, he protested the burden that the entertainment tax was having on county cricket. He retired as secretary in 1926 and was succeeded by William Findlay. Upon his retirement, he was elected a trustee of the MCC, which still afforded him great influence over the running of the club. In December 1926, a presentation was made to Lacey following a meeting of the county secretaries, in which they gifted him a motor vehicle and an illuminated book containing appreciations from all the first-class and minor counties clubs for his time as secretary. He enjoyed a good working relationship with Lord Harris, regarded as the dominant presence on the MCC committee.

In addition to his administrative roles within the MCC, Lacey was also an administrator in county cricket. He was elected president of Hampshire County Cricket Club for a two-year term in 1928. As president, in early 1929 he wanted the club to support calls for reforms to the leg before wicket rules to discourage pad play, wishing for "the laws of cricket to be a perfectly ethical code as well as a legal code". He later served as president of Wiltshire County Cricket Club, guiding the club to become debt free for the first time in its history in 1932. He remained club president until 1946, when ill health necessitated Sir Henry Everitt to deputise for him in a meeting to discuss the resumption of cricket following the Second World War.

== Personal life ==
Outside of cricket, Lacey as a member of the Inner Temple was called to the bar to practise as a barrister in 1889, which limited his availability to appear in cricket matches. Lacey married twice. Firstly, on 9 April 1890, he married Helen Carnegie, daughter of the 9th Earl of Northesk. She died on 18 May 1908. He married secondly Mary Marshall (née Ramsay), former wife of J. Campbell Walker.

He served in the First World War with the Secret Service, from its start in 1914 to 1919, the year following its conclusion. Lacey was knighted in the 1926 Birthday Honours for services to cricket and was the first sportsman to be knighted for services to any sport. In 1927, he was appointed chairman of the London Playing Fields Society.

His portrait was painted by George Spencer Watson in 1928.

== Death ==
He died on 26 May 1946 at his home, Sutton Veny House in the Wiltshire village of Sutton Veny, and was survived only by his wife. Flags were flown at half-mast at Lord's upon his death. He was remembered by Sir Pelham Warner as "a man of high character and integrity".

Sporting positions
Preceded by Arthur Wood	Hampshire cricket captain 1888–1889	Succeeded by Russell Bencraft
