= Frank Wright (cricketer, born 1844) =

English cricketer

Frank Wynyard Wright (6 April 1844 – 15 February 1924) played cricket for Oxford University and Lancashire, plus other amateur teams, as a middle-order batsman and occasional wicketkeeper in the 1860s. He was born at Woodstock, Oxfordshire, England and died at Eastbourne, Sussex, England. He was the cousin of the England Test cricketer and FA Cup-winning footballer Teddy Wynyard. He was educated at St John's College, Oxford, then became a Church of England priest and was rector of Hedsor, Buckinghamshire, 1870–76.
