= Hampshire County Cricket Club record by opponent =

This article summarizes the records of Hampshire County Cricket Club by opponent.

== First-class ==
This is a summary of the 2,951 first-class cricket matches played by Hampshire County Cricket Club from 1864 to the end of the 2026 season.

Hampshire County Cricket Club first-class record by opponent
| Opponent | M | W | L | D | T | A | Win% | First | Last |
|---|---|---|---|---|---|---|---|---|---|
| Australian Imperial Forces | 1 | 0 | 0 | 1 | 0 | 0 | 0.00 | 1919 | 1919 |
| Australians | 26 | 2 | 13 | 11 | 0 | 1 | 7.70 | 1896 | 2001 |
| Cambridge University | 20 | 7 | 3 | 10 | 0 | 0 | 35.00 | 1897 | 1996 |
| Cardiff MCCU | 3 | 0 | 0 | 3 | 0 | 0 | 0.00 | 2016 | 2018 |
| Combined Services | 2 | 2 | 0 | 0 | 0 | 0 | 100.00 | 1948 | 1949 |
| Derbyshire | 148 | 51 | 45 | 52 | 0 | 0 | 35.14 | 1876 | 2014 |
| Durham | 34 | 12 | 6 | 16 | 0 | 2 | 35.29 | 1992 | 2025 |
| Essex | 155 | 39 | 56 | 60 | 0 | 2 | 25.16 | 1895 | 2026 |
| Glamorgan | 130 | 47 | 25 | 58 | 0 | 1 | 36.15 | 1921 | 2026 |
| Gentlemen of Philadelphia | 3 | 2 | 0 | 1 | 0 | 0 | 66.66 | 1897 | 1908 |
| Gloucestershire | 174 | 58 | 48 | 68 | 0 | 2 | 33.33 | 1907 | 2022 |
| Indians | 14 | 2 | 5 | 7 | 0 | 0 | 14.29 | 1932 | 2002 |
| Ireland | 1 | 0 | 0 | 1 | 0 | 0 | 0.00 | 1965 | 1965 |
| Kent | 215 | 46 | 87 | 81 | 1 | 2 | 21.40 | 1867 | 2024 |
| Lancashire | 155 | 20 | 69 | 65 | 1 | 3 | 12.90 | 1870 | 2024 |
| Leicestershire | 170 | 56 | 43 | 71 | 0 | 1 | 32.94 | 1895 | 2026 |
| Loughborough MCCU | 3 | 2 | 0 | 1 | 0 | 0 | 66.67 | 2012 | 2014 |
| Loughborough UCCE | 2 | 0 | 0 | 2 | 0 | 0 | 0.00 | 2006 | 2009 |
| Marylebone Cricket Club | 22 | 8 | 12 | 2 | 0 | 0 | 36.38 | 1866 | 1974 |
| Middlesex | 150 | 32 | 56 | 61 | 1 | 2 | 21.33 | 1864 | 2023 |
| New Zealand A | 1 | 0 | 1 | 0 | 0 | 0 | 0.00 | 2000 | 2000 |
| New Zealanders | 9 | 0 | 2 | 7 | 0 | 0 | 0.00 | 1931 | 1999 |
| Northamptonshire | 118 | 40 | 35 | 43 | 0 | 1 | 33.90 | 1905 | 2023 |
| Nottinghamshire | 151 | 43 | 42 | 66 | 0 | 0 | 28.48 | 1912 | 2026 |
| Oxford MCCU | 2 | 0 | 0 | 2 | 0 | 0 | 0.00 | 2001 | 2019 |
| Oxford UCCE | 1 | 0 | 0 | 1 | 0 | 1 | 100.00 | 2001 | 2003 |
| Oxford University | 47 | 24 | 3 | 20 | 0 | 0 | 51.07 | 1912 | 1999 |
| Oxford Universities | 0 | 0 | 0 | 0 | 0 | 1 | 0.00 | 2000 | 2000 |
| Pakistanis | 7 | 1 | 1 | 5 | 0 | 0 | 14.29 | 1962 | 1992 |
| Rest of the World XI | 1 | 1 | 0 | 0 | 0 | 0 | 100.00 | 1968 | 1968 |
| Somerset | 220 | 75 | 57 | 88 | 0 | 3 | 34.09 | 1882 | 2026 |
| South Africa A | 1 | 0 | 1 | 0 | 0 | 0 | 0.00 | 2017 | 2017 |
| South Africans | 13 | 1 | 5 | 7 | 0 | 0 | 7.70 | 1901 | 1994 |
| Sri Lankans | 5 | 0 | 1 | 4 | 0 | 0 | 0.00 | 1981 | 1998 |
| Sri Lanka Cricket Development XI | 1 | 0 | 0 | 1 | 0 | 0 | 0.00 | 2022 | 2022 |
| Surrey | 199 | 32 | 93 | 74 | 0 | 3 | 16.08 | 1865 | 2026 |
| Sussex | 220 | 57 | 80 | 82 | 1 | 0 | 25.91 | 1864 | 2026 |
| Warwickshire | 170 | 48 | 53 | 69 | 0 | 3 | 28.24 | 1895 | 2026 |
| West Indians | 14 | 2 | 5 | 7 | 0 | 0 | 17.15 | 1906 | 1995 |
| Worcestershire | 159 | 55 | 39 | 65 | 0 | 2 | 34.59 | 1900 | 2025 |
| Yorkshire | 182 | 24 | 76 | 82 | 0 | 3 | 13.19 | 1895 | 2026 |
| Young Australia | 1 | 0 | 1 | 0 | 0 | 0 | 0.00 | 1995 | 1995 |
| Zimbabweans | 1 | 0 | 0 | 1 | 0 | 0 | 0.00 | 2000 | 2000 |
| All First-Class | 2,951 | 789 | 968 | 1,190 | 4 | 33 | 26.74 | 1864 | 2026 |

== List A ==
This is a summary of the 1,059 List A cricket matches played by Hampshire County Cricket Club from 1963 to the end of the 2026 One-Day Cup.

Hampshire County Cricket Club List A record by opponent
| Opponent | M | W | L | T | NR | A | Win% | First | Last |
|---|---|---|---|---|---|---|---|---|---|
| Bangladesh A | 1 | 1 | 0 | 0 | 0 | 1 | 100.00 | 2005 | 2013 |
| Barbados | 2 | 0 | 2 | 0 | 0 | 0 | 0.00 | 2017/18 | 2017/18 |
| Bedfordshire | 1 | 1 | 0 | 0 | 0 | 0 | 100.00 | 1968 | 1968 |
| Berkshire | 2 | 2 | 0 | 0 | 0 | 0 | 100.00 | 1985 | 1991 |
| British Universities | 2 | 2 | 0 | 0 | 0 | 1 | 100.00 | 1997 | 1998 |
| Buckinghamshire | 1 | 1 | 0 | 0 | 0 | 0 | 100.00 | 1970 | 1970 |
| Cambridgeshire | 2 | 2 | 0 | 0 | 0 | 0 | 100.00 | 1994 | 1997 |
| Cheshire | 3 | 3 | 0 | 0 | 0 | 0 | 100.00 | 1981 | 2004 |
| Combined Campuses and Colleges | 2 | 2 | 0 | 0 | 0 | 0 | 100.00 | 2017/18 | 2017/18 |
| Combined Universities | 8 | 8 | 0 | 0 | 0 | 0 | 100.00 | 1978 | 1995 |
| Derbyshire | 49 | 30 | 18 | 1 | 0 | 6 | 61.22 | 1963 | 2026 |
| Dorset | 3 | 3 | 0 | 0 | 0 | 0 | 100.00 | 1987 | 1998 |
| Durham | 29 | 15 | 12 | 0 | 2 | 2 | 51.72 | 1992 | 2026 |
| Essex | 75 | 39 | 33 | 0 | 3 | 2 | 52.00 | 1969 | 2026 |
| Glamorgan | 69 | 40 | 28 | 0 | 1 | 4 | 57.97 | 1967 | 2026 |
| Gloucestershire | 64 | 29 | 31 | 2 | 2 | 6 | 45.31 | 1969 | 2025 |
| Hertfordshire | 2 | 2 | 0 | 0 | 0 | 0 | 100.00 | 1983 | 1986 |
| Ireland | 4 | 4 | 0 | 0 | 0 | 1 | 100.00 | 1996 | 2009 |
| Kent | 70 | 27 | 38 | 0 | 5 | 2 | 38.57 | 1965 | 2024 |
| Kent Cricket Board | 3 | 3 | 0 | 0 | 0 | 0 | 100.00 | 2000 | 2002 |
| Lancashire | 66 | 25 | 36 | 1 | 4 | 2 | 37.88 | 1969 | 2024 |
| Leicestershire | 51 | 23 | 24 | 0 | 4 | 3 | 45.10 | 1969 | 2025 |
| Lincolnshire | 2 | 2 | 0 | 0 | 0 | 0 | 100.00 | 1966 | 1967 |
| Middlesex | 65 | 34 | 28 | 1 | 2 | 5 | 52.31 | 1969 | 2026 |
| Minor Counties | 4 | 3 | 1 | 0 | 0 | 0 | 75.00 | 1981 | 1991 |
| Minor Counties South | 3 | 3 | 0 | 0 | 0 | 0 | 100.00 | 1972 | 1974 |
| Norfolk | 3 | 3 | 0 | 0 | 0 | 0 | 100.00 | 1965 | 1996 |
| Northamptonshire | 46 | 22 | 22 | 0 | 2 | 2 | 47.83 | 1969 | 2024 |
| Nottinghamshire | 53 | 29 | 23 | 0 | 1 | 0 | 54.72 | 1969 | 2025 |
| Pakistan A | 1 | 0 | 1 | 0 | 0 | 0 | 0.00 | 1997 | 1997 |
| Scotland | 11 | 10 | 0 | 0 | 1 | 0 | 90.90 | 1992 | 2013 |
| Shropshire | 2 | 2 | 0 | 0 | 0 | 0 | 100.00 | 1998 | 2005 |
| Somerset | 60 | 29 | 29 | 1 | 1 | 5 | 48.33 | 1969 | 2024 |
| Sri Lanka A | 1 | 0 | 0 | 0 | 1 | 0 | 0.00 | 2015 | 2015 |
| Sri Lankans | 0 | 0 | 0 | 0 | 0 | 1 | 0.00 | 1998 | 1998 |
| Staffordshire | 1 | 1 | 0 | 0 | 0 | 0 | 100.00 | 1993 | 1993 |
| Surrey | 67 | 32 | 32 | 1 | 2 | 3 | 47.76 | 1966 | 2025 |
| Sussex | 60 | 36 | 23 | 0 | 1 | 3 | 60.00 | 1967 | 2026 |
| Trinidad and Tobago | 2 | 0 | 2 | 0 | 0 | 0 | 0.00 | 2017/18 | 2017/18 |
| Warwickshire | 54 | 26 | 27 | 0 | 1 | 0 | 48.15 | 1964 | 2023 |
| West Indians | 3 | 1 | 2 | 0 | 0 | 0 | 33.33 | 1988 | 2000 |
| West Indies A | 1 | 1 | 0 | 0 | 0 | 0 | 100.00 | 2006 | 2006 |
| Wiltshire | 3 | 3 | 0 | 0 | 0 | 0 | 100.00 | 1964 | 1973 |
| Windward Islands | 2 | 0 | 2 | 0 | 0 | 0 | 0.00 | 2017/18 | 2017/18 |
| Worcestershire | 56 | 23 | 30 | 1 | 2 | 4 | 41.07 | 1966 | 2026 |
| Yorkshire | 49 | 28 | 20 | 0 | 1 | 1 | 57.14 | 1969 | 2026 |
| Zimbabweans | 1 | 1 | 0 | 0 | 0 | 0 | 100.00 | 2003 | 2003 |
| All List A | 1,059 | 551 | 464 | 8 | 36 | 53 | 52.03 | 1963 | 2026 |

== Twenty20 ==
This article is a summary of the 311 Twenty20 cricket matches played by Hampshire County Cricket Club from 2003 to the end of the 2026 season.

Hampshire County Cricket Club Twenty20 record by opponent
| Opponent | M | W | L | T | NR | A | Win% | First | Last |
|---|---|---|---|---|---|---|---|---|---|
| Auckland | 1 | 0 | 1 | 0 | 0 | 0 | 0.00 | 2012/13 | 2012/13 |
| Barbados | 1 | 0 | 0 | 1 | 0 | 0 | 0.00 | 2010/11 | 2010/11 |
| Canada | 1 | 0 | 1 | 0 | 0 | 0 | 0.00 | 2010/11 | 2010/11 |
| Derbyshire | 1 | 1 | 0 | 0 | 0 | 0 | 100.00 | 2017 | 2017 |
| Durham | 2 | 2 | 0 | 0 | 0 | 0 | 100.00 | 2011 | 2025 |
| Essex | 47 | 22 | 18 | 3 | 4 | 4 | 46.81 | 2003 | 2026 |
| Glamorgan | 20 | 12 | 7 | 0 | 1 | 2 | 60.00 | 2010 | 2025 |
| Gloucestershire | 19 | 14 | 4 | 0 | 1 | 3 | 73.68 | 2010 | 2025 |
| Guyana Amazon Warriors | 1 | 0 | 1 | 0 | 0 | 0 | 0.00 | 2024/25 | 2024/25 |
| Kent | 38 | 17 | 19 | 1 | 1 | 1 | 44.74 | 2003 | 2026 |
| Lahore Qalandars | 1 | 0 | 1 | 0 | 0 | 0 | 0.00 | 2024/25 | 2024/25 |
| Lancashire | 5 | 2 | 3 | 0 | 0 | 0 | 40.00 | 2004 | 2022 |
| Leeward Islands | 1 | 1 | 0 | 0 | 0 | 0 | 100.00 | 2010/11 | 2010/11 |
| Middlesex | 43 | 25 | 15 | 1 | 2 | 5 | 58.14 | 2003 | 2026 |
| Northamptonshire | 3 | 1 | 2 | 0 | 0 | 0 | 33.33 | 2009 | 2026 |
| Nottinghamshire | 5 | 4 | 1 | 0 | 0 | 0 | 80.00 | 2012 | 2026 |
| Rangpur Riders | 1 | 0 | 0 | 1 | 0 | 0 | 0.00 | 2024/25 | 2024/25 |
| Sialkot Stallions | 1 | 0 | 1 | 0 | 0 | 0 | 0.00 | 2012/13 | 2012/13 |
| Somerset | 32 | 10 | 21 | 1 | 0 | 3 | 31.25 | 2010 | 2026 |
| Surrey | 35 | 15 | 20 | 0 | 0 | 5 | 42.86 | 2003 | 2026 |
| Sussex | 43 | 23 | 17 | 0 | 3 | 5 | 53.49 | 2003 | 2026 |
| Trinidad and Tobago | 2 | 0 | 1 | 0 | 1 | 0 | 0.00 | 2010/11 | 2010/11 |
| Victoria | 1 | 0 | 1 | 0 | 0 | 0 | 0.00 | 2024/25 | 2024/25 |
| Warwickshire | 2 | 2 | 0 | 0 | 0 | 0 | 100.00 | 2010 | 2022 |
| Worcestershire | 2 | 2 | 0 | 0 | 0 | 0 | 100.00 | 2015 | 2023 |
| Windward Islands | 1 | 1 | 0 | 0 | 0 | 0 | 100.00 | 2010/11 | 2010/11 |
| Yorkshire | 2 | 2 | 0 | 0 | 0 | 0 | 100.00 | 2012 | 2026 |
| All Twenty20 | 311 | 156 | 134 | 8 | 13 | 28 | 50.16 | 2003 | 2026 |
