= George Ede =

English cricketer and jockey

Personal information
- Full name: George Matthew Ede
- Born: 22 February 1834; Southampton, Hampshire, England
- Died: 13 March 1870 (aged 36); Sefton, Lancashire, England
- Height: 5 ft 7 in (1.70 m)
- Batting: Right-handed
- Bowling: Unknown
- Relatives: Edward Ede senior (twin brother); Edward Ede junior (nephew)

Domestic team information
- Years: Team
- 1864–1869: Hampshire

Career statistics
Competition	First-class
Matches	15
Runs scored	257
Batting average	9.51
100s/50s	–/1
Top score	52
Balls bowled	52
Wickets	1
Bowling average	22.00
5 wickets in innings	–
10 wickets in match	–
Best bowling	1/22
Catches/stumpings	–/–
- Source: Cricinfo, 25 August 2009

George Matthew Ede (22 February 1834 – 13 March 1870) was an English first-class cricketer and a Grand National winning jockey. A founding member of Hampshire County Cricket Club, he was the club's first captain from 1864 to 1869. In horse racing, he was one of the most successful amateur riders of his age, winning 306 races, including the 1868 Grand National. He was killed two years later from injuries sustained in a race over the Grand National course at the 1870 meeting.

== Early life and education ==
The son of Job Ede and his wife, Catherine, he was born alongside his twin brother, Edward, at Southampton in February 1834. He was educated and boarded at Abingdon School in 1851, with his brother Edward. His older brother Frederic boarded at Abingdon in 1840. He was also educated at Eton College. After completing his education, he became an agriculturalist at Northampton under Lord Spencer, before returning to Southampton.

== Cricket career ==
Ede first appeared for Hampshire in minor matches in 1861 and recorded the first century at the Antelope Ground in 1862, scoring 122 for South Hampshire v East Hampshire. A founding member of Hampshire County Cricket Club in 1863, he scored over 1,200 runs for the club in its founding year.

He made his debut in first-class cricket in the clubs inaugural first-class match against Sussex at Southampton the following year, with him captaining the side. Ede played first-class cricket for Hampshire until 1869, making fifteen appearances. In his third match, against Sussex, he scored 52 in Hampshire's first innings, by doing so he became the first batsman to score a half century for the county club. Playing as a batsman in the Hampshire team, he scored 257 runs at an average of 9.51. During his playing period, he was also honorary secretary of the club until 1867, when he resigned and was replaced by William Eccles. Following his death, he was succeeded as Hampshire captain by Clement Booth.

== Horse racing career ==
Coming from the age of the public school educated all round sportsman, it is perhaps as an accomplished horse racing jockey that Ede is better remembered, riding for several years as one of the top Victorian amateurs in steeplechasing. He was considered, following the retirement of Josey Little, to be the first gentlemen rider of his age, not only in England but the world. Racing under the pseudonym 'Mr Edwards', he first competed as a rider in September 1856 at Warwick Racecourse. Between 1856 and 1870, Ede rode 306 winners. Amongst his greatest achievements came in 1868, when he won the Grand Annual at Warwick on Musketeer, and the Grand National at Aintree on Lamb, owned by Lord Poulett. These feats were made even more remarkable by the fact he had been seriously injured in a fall just a few months earlier at Croydon Racecourse, followed by a complicated recovery. It was at Aintree where Ede would suffer the injuries which ultimately cost him his life.

Having competed in the 1870 Grand National, Ede was leaving the course when he was approached by a trainer to ride a horse named Chippenham in the following day's Grand Sefton Steeplechase over the notorious big fences. He had not planned to ride the following day, and it was widely believed that he would be announcing his retirement from the saddle, but when presented with a mount the following day he accepted. His close friend and riding colleague Arthur Yates implored him not to take the ride, which had already been refused by many of the top professional riders, stating "Don't ride the brute George, he'll kill you!" Yates' words were to prove prophetic. At the Monument fence, today known as The Chair, Ede fell from Chippenham and although the initial fall did not injure him, it was when the horse tried to rise that he was fatally injured when Chippenham stumbled and crashed heavily onto him, causing crush injuries to his chest and several broken ribs, in addition causing a serious head injury. Ede succumbed to his injuries three days later at the Sefton home of horse trainer Ben Land, without regaining consciousness.

Sporting positions
Preceded by New position	Hampshire cricket captain 1864–1869	Succeeded by Clement Booth
