= 1870 Grand National =

English steeplechase horse race

- Grand National
- Location: Aintree
- Date: 9 March 1870
- Winning horse: The Colonel
- Starting price: 7/2 F
- Jockey: (England) George Stevens
- Trainer: R. Roberts
- Owner: Matthew Evans
- Conditions: Good to firm

The 1870 Grand National was the 32nd renewal of the Grand National horse race that took place at Aintree Racecourse near Liverpool, England, on 9 March 1870. This was the fifth and final time George Stevens rode the winner in the Grand National.

== The Course ==
After crowd encroachment the previous year, the course was widened with rails added to the approach of fences one, two and three, although the fences themselves were unaltered.

First circuit: From the start, the runners had a long run away from the racecourse, across the lane towards Fence 1 {15} Ditch and Rails Fence 2 {16} Ditch and Bank, Fence 3 {17} Double Rails, Fence 4 {18} Rails and Ditch, Fence 5 {19} Becher's Brook Fence 6 {20} Post and Rails, Fence 7 {21} Post and Rails, Fence 8 {22} Post and Rails {Canal Turn}, Fence 9 {23} Valentine's Brook, Fence 10 {24} Drop, Fence 11 {25} Post and Rails, Fence 12 {26} Table.

The runners then crossed the lane at the canal bridge to re-enter the racecourse proper, turning at the first opportunity towards the fences in front of the stands. Fence 13 Made Fence, Fence 14 Stand Water.

Second circuit: The runners then turned away from the Grandstands again and crossed the lane again, following the first circuit until reaching the racecourse again. This time the runners continued to the wider extreme of the course after crossing the lane at canal bridge before turning to run up the straight in front of the stands where two hurdles, Fence 27 and Fence 28 had to be jumped

The runners then bypassed the Made Fence and Stand Water inside before reaching the winning post in front of the Main Stand.

== Leading Contenders ==
The Colonel was made 4/1 favourite on the day to repeat his victory of the previous year. George Stevens was again in the saddle, now being the only rider ever to have won the race four times.

The Doctor had been a long time ante post favourite until the day of the race, being sent off at 5/1, having finished sixth in his previous appearance in the race four years earlier. This was George Holman's eighth ride in the race, having twice finished fourth previously.

Primrose was at 9/1 third favourite and the best supported runner having her first attempt at the National. It was also a debut ride for her owner, Mr Brockton.

Surney was fourth in market at 100/8, providing a debut ride in the race for Richard I'Anson.

The leading public fancies were completed by a trio of 100/7 shotss who had experienced mixed fortunes last year. Q.C. had finished fifth and was a debut ride for Arthur Yates, Guy Of Warwick had refused at the second fence, but the public put this down to the lack of space at the first three fences, which this year would not be a problem. He also had the benefit of former winning rider, George Ede who was having his tenth ride. Pearl Diver had been considered very unlucky to fall late on in last year's National and was also aided by a formerly successful rider, Johnny Page, taking his sixth mount in the race.

In a publicity stunt before this year's race, an athlete by the name of Tom Scott jumped a circuit of the course without the assistance of a horse. At this time the course was still not fully laid to turf and some of the obstacles were still natural hedges and banks making this a difficult two mile cross country run.

== The Race ==
Scottish Grand National winner, The Elk was first to show at the off, with Primrose, Gardener, Guy Of Warwick and Kerslake prominent going to the first fence, where the improvements of adding the rails to control the crowd and leave more space paid dividends when only Traveller exited the contest. Fan who had added to the notoriety of her hatred of this course, by refusing yet again at the second fence during the Autumn meeting, this time cleared the fence, only to promptly crash through the rails of the third fence in trying to refuse there.

The Elk and Primrose continued to set the pace throughout the first circuit and entered the racecourse with twenty of the twenty-three starters still standing, Middleton being the missing competitor after running outside the flag at the post and rails at the Canal Turn.

At the Made Fence beside the distance chair, Ede rushed Guy Of Warwick to the front only for the horse to do his best to refuse, the Cricketing jockey did well to not only get his mount over, but avoided a pile up in the process. That put The Elk and Primrose back where they had been throughout, at the head of the field, chased by Gardener, Karslake, Pretentaine II, Cristal, Q.C., Surney, The Doctor, Keystone, Guy Of Warwick, The Colonel, Moose and Pearl Diver. The remaining six runners, Cinna, Scarrington, Tathwell, Alcibiade, Casse Tete and Hall Court being tailed off.

Hall Court was clearly struggling, the two time runner up, taking part for the sixth time, pulling up having badly broken down before setting off for the second circuit.

The Elk and Primrose continued to lead the way with Surney moving up to dispute on the run down to Bechers. However, the Scottish National winner's lead from the front efforts were starting to take its toll and he rapidly dropped back after taking the brook.

At Valentines, Primrose remained at the head of affairs, though this was now partly due to his tongue getting caught in his bit, which made it harder for his owner/rider, Brockton to control his mount. Surney was upsides with Karslake, Q.C., Gardener, The Doctor, Keystone, The Colonel, Pearl Diver, Moose and Guy Of Warwick all still close up while Pretentaine II and Cristal were now losing touch.

Surney and Primrose retained their lead to the penultimate hurdle where a poor jump ended the former's chance, dropping back to fifth as Primrose led a tightly grouped quarter of The Doctor, Pearl Diver and The Colonel towards the last hurdle. The bookies also gulped at the sight of the first five runners in the betting market now planning to fight out the finish.

The Colonel cleared the final flight better than the tiring Primrose while The Doctor jumped well to set up a finish between the favourite and second favourite. The result remained in doubt all the way up the run in before The Colonel held off The Doctor to win by a neck and join the elite group of dule winners while George Stevens increased his record as a winning jockey to five. Primrose was a very unlucky third by four lengths, with some pundits speculating that she would have won had Brockton been able to control her up the Canal side. Surney was fourth another five lengths down on the blackest of Grand National days for the bookies. Having been able to give the runners every chance at the early fences, a record seventeen completed the course.

== Finishing Order ==
Position	Name	Jockey	Handicap (st-lb)	SP	Distance	Colours
Winner	The Colonel	George Stevens	11-12	4/1 Fav	Neck	Blue, white sleeves, black cap
Second	The Doctor	George Holman	11-7	5/1	3 Lengths	Brown, white sleeves and cap
Third	Primrose	William Brockton	10-12	9/1	4 Lengths	Buff
Fourth	Surney	R I'Anson	10-4	100/8		Purple, white seams and cap
Fifth	Keystone	Robert Walker	10-12	200/1		White, blue seams and cap
Sixth	Gardener	Tom Ryan	10-12	20-1		White, blue cap
Seventh	Q.C.	Arthur Yates	10-10	100-7		Black, yellow sash, black cap
Eighth	Alcibiade	Captain Frederick 'Lummy' Harford	10-12	33-1		Cherry, yellow spots and cap
Ninth	Scarrington	John Wheeler	10-12	100-1		White, black sash and cap
Tenth	Moose	Alfred French	11-7	40/1		Red, red and yellow quartered cap
Eleventh	Karslake	Arthur Tempest	10-0	66/1		Black, white sleeves, black cap
Twelfth	Guy of Warwick	George Ede	10-8	100/7		White, red cap
Thirteenth	Pearl Driver	Johnny Page	12-7	100/7		Red, yellow cap
Fourteenth	Cristal	Hiram Crawshaw	10-6	20-1		Cerise, French grey sleeves and cap
Fifteenth	Pretentaine II	John Mumford	10-8	200/1	Passed the post but probably bypassed the final hurdles	Grey, red hoop and cap
Sixteenth	Casse Tete	Joseph Rudd	10-0	200/1	Passed the post but probably bypassed the final hurdles	Red, black cap
Seventeenth	The Elk	Ben Land	10-7	100/1	Passed the post but probably bypassed the final hurdles	Light blue
Fence 28 {Final Hurdle}	Cinna	Count	10-7	50-1	Pulled up	Brown, red cap
Fence 28 {Final Hurdle}	Tathwell	George Waddington	10-12	20/1	Broke Down, Pulled Up	Buff, red sleeves, black cap
Fence 15 {Post & Rails}	Hall Court	Tommy Pickernell	10-12	40/1	Broke Down, Pulled Up	Cerise, white sash and cap
Fence 8 {Post & Rails at Canal Turn}	Middleton	Kirk	10-12	200/1	Ran Out	Black, pink cap
Fence 3 {Double Rails}	Fan	Harry Taylor	10-0	66/1	Refused	Orange, blue sash and cap
Fence 1 {Ditch & Rails}	Traveller	Napier	10-4	66/1	Fell	Tartan, yellow sleeves and cap

== Aftermath ==
The Colonel became the third horse to win the annual principal race at the Liverpool Spring Meeting twice, the second to become an official duel Grand National winner and the first to retain the race as defending champion. George Stevens extended his record as the most successful rider in Grand National history to five wins.

The changes in widening the approach to the first three fences and adding rails to control the crowd were hailed as a huge success with just two horses eliminated from the race in the early stages and seventeen completing the course, although some of those had likely pulled up and bypassed the final obstacles.

Two jockeys who took part in this year's race would be killed while racing before the end of the year. George Ede accepted a chance ride on Chippenham in the Grand Sefton Chase over the same fences the day after the National, despite a warning from friend and colleague, Arthur Yates that the horse could quite possibly kill him. Ede suffered critical crush injuries in a fall at the Made Fence, today known as the chair and never recovered, dying three days later. Harry Taylor, whose debut National ride ended with a third fence refusal onboard Fan died days after a fall in September.
