= 1868 Grand National =

English steeplechase horse race

- Grand National
- Location: Aintree
- Date: 4 March 1868
- Winning horse: The Lamb
- Starting price: 9/1
- Jockey: Mr George Ede
- Trainer: Ben Land
- Owner: Lord Poulett
- Conditions: Heavy

The 1868 Grand National was the 30th renewal of the Grand National horse race that took place at Aintree near Liverpool, England, on 4 March 1868.

== The Course ==
The only change to the details description of the course given the previous year was the addition of a second hurdle in the finishing straight. The final fence on the course, previously described as a stump hedge and ditch was this year referred to as the Table Jump, suggesting it was built in the style of a bank, most commonly found on Irish courses such as Punchestown.

First circuit: From the start, the runners had a long run away from the racecourse, across the lane towards Fence 1 {15} Ditch and Rails Fence 2 {16} Ditch and Bank, Fence 3 {17} Double Rails, Fence 4 {18} Rails and Ditch, Fence 5 {19} Becher's Brook Fence 6 {20} Post and Rails, Fence 7 {21} Post and Rails, Fence 8 {22} Canal Turn, Fence 9 {23} Valentine's Brook, Fence 10 {24} Ditch and Quickset, Fence 11 {25} Post and Rails, Fence 12 {26} Table.

The runners then crossed the lane at the canal bridge to re-enter the racecourse proper, turning at the first opportunity towards the fences in front of the stands. Fence 13 Gorse Hurdle, Fence 14 Stand Water.

Second circuit: The runners then turned away from the Grandstands again and crossed the lane again, following the first circuit until reaching the racecourse again. This time the runners continued to the wider extreme of the course after crossing the lane at canal bridge before turning to run up the straight in front of the stands where Fence 27 Hurdle had to be jumped. This year a second hurdle Fence 28 was reinstated for the first time since 1857.

The runners then bypassed the Gorsed Hurdle and Stand Water inside before reaching the winning post in front of the Main Stand.

== Leading contenders ==
After the late withdrawal of the anti post favourite, Chimney Sweep was installed as the 7/1 favourite for Lord Coventry, despite his dropping the popular regular jockey George Stevens in favour of twenty-three year old Dorset born debut rider, Jimmy Adams who had won the Grand Metropolitan Chase on the horse the previous year.

In a tight betting market Moose was sent off at 8/1 after his owner, Mr Brayley declared him to be the better of his pair of entrants. With Stevens not having a ride in the race, Walter White weighed out as the most experienced rider this year, taking his twelfth ride, the most of any rider ever not to have previously won the race.

Pearl Diver was the second of Mr Brayley's pair and showed how powerful his stable was when the public still backed him to 9/1 despite the stable preference for Moose the relatively young and inexperienced J Tomlinson made the second string his debut in the race.

The Lamb was backed down to 10/1 after it was reported he had easily beaten his better fancied stable companion in a trial before that horse was withdrawn from the race. George Ede was to take the ride as his eighth in the race, having finished second on Weathercock at his first attempt ten years earlier.

Fan was backed to 10/1 largely on the back of her finishing second last year with Arthur Thorpe retaining the ride as his third in the race.

Helen was also a short price at 10/1 in the very open market, her price falling sharply when duel winner, Alec Goodman became available at the last moment when his intended mount was withdrawn.

== The Race ==
Garus was first to show at the off, leading Huntsman's Daughter, Charming Woman, Mentmore, Captain Crosstree, The Lamb and Alcibiade with Buszke and The Plover slow away and bringing up the rear. However, favourite backers hopes were ended in literally shattering circumstances when Chimney Sweep struck a boulder, which lined the lane and suffered a horrific broken leg.

The remainder continued to the first fence where Slieve Carne refused while last year's runner up, Fan followed suit at the second, eventually being enticed over only to refuse again at the next fence. Charming Woman also refused here, eventually continuing on to Becher's Brook where a fall ended her contest, joining the early leader Garus who refused, hampering Thalassius who fell and was soon joined by tail enders, Mentmore and Kingswood in coming to grief.

Only thirteen continued around the Canal Turn and back towards the stands, led by Captain Crosstree, The Lamb, Daisy, Astrolabe and Alcibiade.

At the Stand Water Pearl Diver was driven to the front, just leading The Lamb over with Captain Crosstree, Alcibiade, Huntsman's Daughter, Moose, Buszke and Daisy. The Nun came next but stumbled on landing, leaving her young rider, Wheeler, little chance of staying on board, having failed to recover an iron from a jumping error at the Gorsed Hurdle just before. The remaining quartet of The Plover, Helen, Astrolabe and Hall Court were almost swallowed up by the poorly controlled crowd as they negotiated the jump. The remounted Kingswood was so far behind that by the time the clearly exhausted horse reached the fence, the police had placed a crowd control rope in front of it, causing the rider to receive a thoroughly deserved soaking in the water.

The Plover was the only casualty on the way to Bechers for the second time, refusing at the first fence on the second circuit as Captain Crosstree, Pearl Diver, The Lamb and Alcibiade began to draw clear of their six tiring rivals to the point that, barring all four coming to grief, the race lay between them by the time the brook, Canal Turn and Valentines were taken. Behind them Buszke called it a day at Valentine's while Tommy Pickernell saw no point in taking Daisy any farther than the fence beyond it.

For the leading quartet it was the former winner, Alcibiade who was first to fade, losing touch as the leading trio reached the Table jump at the Canal lane. Captain Crosstree decided his day's racing was done and dug his heels in here to leave the race reduced to a match between Pearl Diver and The Lamb turning for the home straight and final hurdles. both were showing signs of fatigue with tired jumps on the run in as the inexperienced Tomlinson tried to race Pearl Diver while Ede nursed The Lamb. The latter method proved the better option and the Irish grey eased ahead to secure victory by two lengths. Alcibiade was a further ten lengths back in third, just beating off the unlucky Captain Crosstree by three lengths, the fourth horse having cleared the Table at the second attempt. Huntsman's Daughter, Moose and Hall Court began walking in long before the final hurdle to allow Astrolabe and Helen to be recorded as the only other official finishers.

== Finishing Order ==
Position	Name	Jockey	Handicap (st-lb)	SP	Distance	Colours
Winner	The Lamb	George Ede	10-7	10-1	2 lengths	Cerise, blues sleeves and cap
Second	Pearl Driver	J. Tomlinson	10-12	9-1	10 lengths	Red, black cap
Third	Alcibiade	Colonel George 'Curly' Knox	11-10	100-6	3 lengths	Cherry, yellow spots and cap
Fourth	Captain Crosstree	William Reeves	10-5	33-1	A distance - Refused Fence 26, went on	Pink and white diablo, white cap pink diamonds
Fifth	Astrolabe	Alfred French	12-0	25-1		Pink and white stripes, black cap
Sixth and last	Helen	Alec Goodman	10-0	10-1		Brown, black cap
Fence 28 {Final Hurdle}	Hall Court	Ben Land	11-4	50-1	Pulled up and walked in	Scarlet, white sash and cap
Fence 28 {Final Hurdle}	Huntsman's Daughter	George Holman	10-12	100-6	Pulled Up	Claret, black cap
Fence 28 {Final Hurdle}	Moose	Walter White	10-7	8-1	Pulled Up	Red, yellow cap
Fence 24 {Ditch and Quickset}	Daisy	Tommy Pickernell	11-7	11-1	Pulled Up	Orange, black cap
Fence 23 {Valentine's Brook}	Buszke	Count László Szapáry	12-0	40-1	Pulled Up	Blue, red sleeves and cap
Fence 15 {Ditch and Rails}	The Plover	R Walker	10-10	100-1	Refused	White, black sleeves and cap
Fence 14 {Stand Water}	The Nun	John Wheeler	11-6	100-6	Fell	Red and purple jagged horizontal halves, red cap
Fence 5 {Bechers Brook}	Garus	Johnny Page	10-12	33-1	Refused	Cerise, light blue sleeves and cap
Fence 5 {Bechers Brook}	Kingswood	Gilroy	10-12	100-1	Fell, remounted tailed off and fell again Fence 14	Blue, black cap
Fence 5 {Bechers Brook}	Mentmore	Larry Hyland	10-4	100-1	Fell	Blue, black cap
Fence 5 {Bechers Brook}	Thalassius	H Crawshaw	10-0	40-1	Hampered and Fell	Light blue, black and yellow sash, black cap
Fence 3 {Double Rails}	Charming Woman	J Terratta	10-0	100-1	Fell	Red, white cap
Fence 2 {Ditch and Bank}	Fan	Arthur Thorpe	10-6	10-1	Refused, went on tailed off, refused again Fence 3.	Brown, white cap
Before Fence 1 {The lane}	Chimney Sweep	Jimmy Adams	12-0	7-1	struck a boulder and fractured a pastern	Brown, light blue cap
Fence 1 {Ditch and Rails}	Slieve Carne	Pritchard	10-0	50-1	Refused	Blue birds eye

== Aftermath ==
The scenes after the race were considered unprecedented, with spectators cutting hairs from The Lambs tail to keep as souvenirs. The press were scathing about what they considered the uncouth behaviour of the Irish contingent in their celebrations.

There was also much criticism of crowd control at the course, particularly around the Stand Water where many of the tail enders in the race had been forced to weave their way through the encroaching crowd to take the fence, despite a heavy police presence. They also dolled off the fence with a rope before the last horse had reached them, although the criticism was aimed more at the rider of Kingswood, Gilroy for riding the horse so aggressively when almost half a mile behind the field.

The fate of Chimney Sweep became known to the crowd when Jimmy Adams was seen running back towards the stands with his saddle shouting "He's killed!" It emerged that Chimney Sweep had struck a boulder marking the edge of the lane being crossed on the way to the first fence and shattered a pastern in five places, the attending vet claiming it to be the worst racing injury they had witnessed. A visibly upset Lord Coventry ordered the misery of his horse be immediately ended and he be buried where he fell to be saved from 'going to the dogs'.
