= Clement Booth =

English cricketer

Personal information
- Born: 11 May 1842; Friskney, Lincolnshire, England
- Died: 14 July 1926 (aged 84); Spilsby, Lincolnshire, England
- Height: 5 ft 11 in (1.80 m)
- Batting: Right-handed
- Bowling: Unknown

Domestic team information
- Years: Team
- 1862–1865: Cambridge University
- 1871–1886: Marylebone Cricket Club
- 1875–1880: Hampshire

Career statistics
Competition	First-class
Matches	75
Runs scored	1,922
Batting average	15.37
100s/50s	–/4
Top score	78
Balls bowled	440
Wickets	5
Bowling average	37.20
5 wickets in innings	–
10 wickets in match	–
Best bowling	1/4
Catches/stumpings	34/–
- Source: Cricinfo, 25 August 2009

Clement Booth (11 May 1842 – 14 July 1926) was an English first-class cricketer and administrator. Booth played first-class cricket for several teams, but was largely associated with Cambridge University, Hampshire and the Marylebone Cricket Club. He was Hampshire County Cricket Club's second captain at first-class level. As an administrator, he was the honorary secretary of both Lincolnshire and Hampshire.

== Early life and cricket career ==
The son of The Reverend Thomas Willingham Booth, he was born in May 1842 at Friskney, Lincolnshire. Booth was educated at Rugby School, where he was coached in cricket by Alfred Diver and Daniel Hayward. From there, he matriculated to Trinity College, Cambridge. At Cambridge, Booth excelled at sport, gaining blues in both cricket and athletics. As a member of Cambridge University Cricket Club, he made his debut in first-class cricket for the University against the Marylebone Cricket Club (MCC) at Fenner's in 1862. He played first-class cricket for the University until 1865, making ten appearances, which included four in The University Match. Booth played minor matches for an early Lincolnshire county organisation, acting as its honorary secretary from 1867 until the end 1871, when he resigned. In the same year as his resignation from Lincolnshire, played first-class cricket for the MCC. His first appearance for the MCC came against Cambridge University at Lord's in 1871, with him making 40 appearances for the MCC from 1871 to 1886. Booth scored 1,013 runs for the MCC at an average of 15.58; he made one half century, a score of 78.

== Hampshire cricket and later life ==
In 1872, Booth had moved to Hampshire where he was a farmer at New House Farm in Kilmeston. Upon moving south, he played minor matches for Hampshire County Cricket Club from 1873, later captaining the club against Kent, which was their first appearance in first-class cricket since 1870; Booth was the club's second captain, after the late George Ede. He played first-class cricket for Hampshire until 1880, making 20 appearances. In these, he scored 620 runs at an average of 17.71; he made three half centuries, recording a highest score of 78. Booth was captain until 1878, being replaced by Arthur Wood in 1879. In addition to playing cricket for Hampshire, he also served as the club's honorary secretary from 1874 to 1879, being succeeded by Russell Bencraft. Upon his appointment to the position, Booth endeavoured to improve the fortunes of Hampshire cricket, although he was unsuccessful in improving the Hampshire's fortunes. Besides his lengthy associations with Cambridge University, the MCC and Hampshire, Booth also played first-class cricket on three occasions for the South in the North v South match, as well as making a single appearance each for the Gentlemen of England and an Oxford and Cambridge Universities Past and Present team. Wisden described Booth's as a "sound free batsman, with strong back play and a fine cut, and an excellent field at long-leg and cover".

By March 1881, his farm had encountered financial difficulties, with Booth being declared bankrupt. Following his bankruptcy, he returned to farming in Lincolnshire at Hundleby Grange near Spilsby. He played club cricket for Spilsby in the 1880s and was associated with Skegness Cricket Club into the 1890s and the turn of the century, helping to organise matches for the club against the MCC and acting as the club's president. In March 1917, Booth and his wife celebrated their 50th wedding anniversary, having married at Elkstone near Cheltenham in March 1867. Booth died at Spilsby in July 1926.

Sporting positions
Preceded by George Ede	Hampshire cricket captain 1875–1878	Succeeded by Arthur Wood
