= Russell Bencraft =

English cricketer (1858–1943)

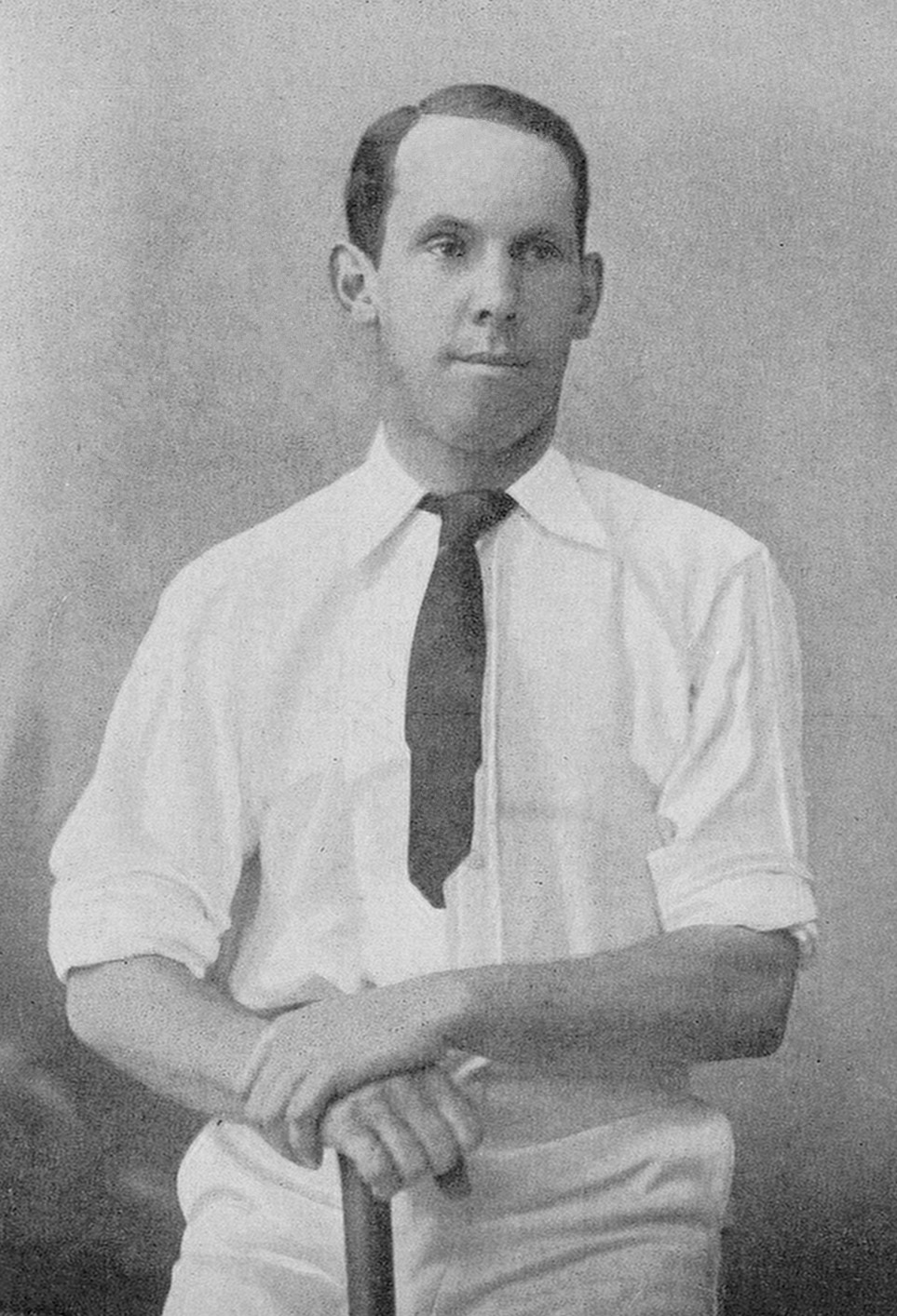

Personal information
- Full name: Henry William Russell Bencraft
- Born: 4 March 1858; Southampton, Hampshire, England
- Died: 25 December 1943 (aged 85); Compton, Hampshire, England
- Batting: Right-handed
- Bowling: Right-arm fast
- Relatives: Ernest Read (nephew)

Domestic team information
- Years: Team
- 1876–1896: Hampshire
- 1881–1885: Marylebone Cricket Club

Career statistics
Competition	First-class
Matches	46
Runs scored	932
Batting average	15.53
100s/50s	–/2
Top score	62*
Balls bowled	363
Wickets	5
Bowling average	39.40
5 wickets in innings	–
10 wickets in match	–
Best bowling	2/15
Catches/stumpings	32/–
- Source: Cricinfo, 24 August 2009

Sir Henry William Russell Bencraft JP (4 March 1858 — 25 December 1943) was an English first-class cricketer, sports administrator, medical doctor, businessman and philanthropist. Bencraft was an important figure in the early history of Hampshire County Cricket Club, overseeing the club from the loss of its first-class status to its reacquisition of that status, both as a player and an administrator. As an administrator, he is credited with saving Hampshire County Cricket Club from extinction in 1880, and later played a role in its reacquisition of first-class status and joining of the County Championship in 1895. Outside of Hampshire cricket, he sat on the committee of the Marylebone Cricket Club, then the governing body of cricket.

Bencraft took an interest in other sports beside cricket and was described as a pioneer of association football in Southampton, holding the chairmanship of Southampton St. Mary's F.C., and was instrumental in the club's move from the Antelope Ground to Northlands Road. He was president of the Hampshire Football Association, overseeing the formation of the Southern Football League. In rugby union, he was president of the Hampshire Rugby Football Union and played for the Trojans. He also held administrative positions across other sporting organisations in the Southampton area.

In his hometown of Southampton, Bencraft played a prominent role in business and civic life, holding appointments with a number of prominent businesses in the town, in addition to sitting on the town council and serving as a magistrate, which he managed alongside his medical career. He was involved in philanthropy in Southampton, raising money for a number of causes and supporting disabled soldiers during the First World War.

== Early life and education ==
The son of Dr. Henry Bencraft senior, he was born at Southampton in March 1858. As a young child he grew fond of cricket by playing it in local fields, often at the deanery of St Mary's Church. His education began at preparatory level at the City College, after which he went up to St Edward's School in Oxford where he was head boy, playing both cricket and football for the school. From there, he matriculated to St George's, University of London to study medicine. He played cricket and football for St George's, in addition to playing club cricket for the United Hospitals. During this time, he once scored six centuries in a week with a highest score of 243. In Hampshire, he played rugby union as a scrum-half for the Trojans in Hampshire. Bencraft later passed the examinations to be admitted to the Royal College of Surgeons of England and Edinburgh in 1885.

== Cricket career and administration ==
After strong performances in club cricket in Southampton, he was noticed by Hampshire and made his debut in first-class cricket for them against Kent at Faversham in 1876, at the age of 18. The following year during a meeting at Winchester to decide whether Hampshire County Cricket Club should be wound up, he was appointed secretary of the club, replacing Clement Booth. Speaking to the magazine Cricket, Bencraft stated he became secretary simply because nobody else could be found who was willing to do it. Three years later, with the club facing extinction, Bencraft took a prominent role in saving it in his capacity as secretary. He succeeded Arthur Wood as captain for the 1880 season, with him captaining the side until 1882. During this period, Bencraft ran the club virtually unassisted, holding the roles of captain, secretary and committee member. He relinquished the captaincy back to Arthur Wood in 1883, and played first-class cricket for Hampshire until their first-class status was revoked in 1885 following years of difficult circumstances and poor results. In the 1880s, Bencraft also played in first-class cricket for the Marylebone Cricket Club (MCC), making two appearances against Oxford University 1881 and Hampshire in 1885. He was subsequently succeeded as honorary secretary of Hampshire in 1885 by James Fellowes, the season in which Hampshire lost first-class status.

Bencraft played an important role alongside Fellowes in Hampshire's acquisition of a new ground on land at Northlands Road, negotiations for which began in 1883 while Bencraft was still club secretary. His best season for Hampshire came during the period in which they did not hold first-class status, with him scoring 428 runs with a highest score of 195 against Warwickshire at Edgbaston. He captained Hampshire for a second time in 1894, succeeding Francis Lacey. While afforded first-class status for the 1894 season, Hampshire did not play any first-class fixtures that season, but Bencraft did lead Hampshire in their first ever County Championship match the following season against Somerset at Taunton in 1895, which Hampshire won by 11 runs. Later in the 1895 season, he led Hampshire to victory against a strong Yorkshire team at Sheffield. He continued to play first-class cricket for Hampshire into the 1896 season, though had relinquished the captaincy to Teddy Wynyard following that season. In total, Bencraft played 44 first-class matches for Hampshire from 1876 to 1896, after which he retired from playing at the age of 37 to focus on his medical career. He scored 908 runs for Hampshire at an average of 15.65; he made two half centuries, with a highest score of 62 not out. Considered a safe pair of hands in the field who usually fielded at cover-point, he took 32 catches.

After finishing his playing career, Bencraft maintained his connection to Hampshire County Cricket Club, holding every office at Hampshire over a 60 years, including club president. He resigned as honorary secretary in 1905, after which the position was abolished. At an annual meeting during the First World War, he advocated for schemes to find cricketers winter work, arguing it was wrong that fit men could not earn a wage outside the cricket season. As a member of the MCC, he served on the MCC Committee and was instrumental in the appointment of Hampshire's Lionel Tennyson to captain England midway through the 1921 Ashes Series.

== Administrator in other sports ==
Bencraft was also active in sports administration outside of cricket. Described as a pioneer of association football in Southampton, he succeeded Canon Basil Wilberforce as president of Southampton St. Mary's F.C., with his connections helping them secure the use of the County Ground at Northlands Road, at an annual rental of £200, when the Antelope Ground was sold for re-development in 1896. He held the position of club president until its conversion into a company, thereafter assisting in its development. As president of the Hampshire Football Association, he oversaw the formation of the Southern Football League and presented Southampton St. Mary's with the competition trophy when they won 1896–97 Southern Football League. He maintained his presidency of the Southern Football League until 1908, when he was replaced by Sydney Buxton. He was known to referee football matches, particularly in Hampshire Senior Cup matches.

He also held similar administrative positions in other sports, including as president of the Hampshire Rugby Football Union, the Southampton Civil Service Sports Association, and the Stoneham Golf Club, for which he was also a life-long member. During his tenure as president of the Hampshire Rugby Football Union, the county won the County Championship twice in 1933 and 1936.

== Life outside of sport ==
Like his father before him, Bencraft held the post of medical officer to the St. Mary's Workhouse. He also held a number of similar medical appointments across Southampton; he was medical officer for the Ordnance Survey, Workhouse Infirmary, the Southampton Post Office, Hollybrook Children's Home, and Messrs Edwin Jones & Co. Bencraft's association with medical institutions in Southampton extended to administration, where he was an honorary treasurer of the Royal South Hants Hospital and Southampton Hospital, helping to raise between £30,000 and £40,000 for both hospitals during his tenure. He also lent his assistance to the Free Southampton Eye Hospital.

He was also actively involved in several local companies and was a director of three of the biggest companies in Southampton; these were the Southern Daily Echo, Southampton Gas Company, and Edwin Jones & Co. He was appointed director of the Southern Daily Echo in 1904, subsequently becoming its deputy chairman and later chairman in 1932. With the Southampton Gas Company, he was appointed director in 1914 and was appointed its chairman in 1928, a post he continued to hold on his 75th birthday. The company named a collier Sir Russell in his honour; it was later sunk by enemy action during the Second World War. His business association with Edwin Jones & Co. had begun in 1896, when he was appointed to its board. In 1911, he was appointed to the Southampton Chamber of Commerce. Bencraft had additional business interests in Southampton, as chairman of the Southampton Trustee Savings Bank, a local director of the Royal Exchange Assurance Company, and director of the Chapel Tramways Company.

Bencraft was noted for his philanthropic interests in Southampton. He was chairman of The Hampshire Girls Orphanage, retaining the chairmanship until he relinquished it due to ill health toward the end of his life. He did much to assist military personnel in Southampton during the First World War, helping to raise money for disabled soldiers and contributions toward a church for military personnel on Southampton Common. His civic duties extended to Bencraft being appointed a magistrate in 1895, an appointment he held for nearly fifty years. He was also a councillor, representing the All Saints Ward from November 1889 to 1902. Bencraft was knighted in the 1924 New Year Honours for services to medicine, with a banquet held to celebrate his knighthood in February 1924.

During the Second World War, his house, where he had lived since his birth on Winn Road, was destroyed in a Luftwaffe air raid. Following the destruction of his home, Bencraft and his wife (who had been married since 1889) moved to the village of Compton and Shawford near Winchester. He was a Freemason and was a past master of the Twelve Brothers Lodge in Southampton. Six months after having his left leg amputated above the knee, Bencraft died at Compton and Shawford on Christmas Day in 1943, aged 85; his wife had predeceased him the previous year. His funeral took place five days later at St Mary's Church. His nephew, Ernest Read, was also a first-class cricketer.

Sporting positions
Preceded by Arthur Wood; Francis Lacey	Hampshire cricket captain 1880–1882; 1895	Succeeded by Arthur Wood; Teddy Wynyard
