= Arthur Wood (cricketer, born 1844) =

English cricketer

Personal information
- Full name: Arthur Hardy Wood
- Born: 25 May 1844; Bentworth, Hampshire, England
- Died: 10 July 1933 (aged 89); Hove, Sussex, England
- Height: 6 ft 0 in (1.83 m)
- Batting: Right-handed
- Bowling: Unknown
- Role: Wicket-keeper
- Relatives: Arthur Wood junior (son)

Domestic team information
- Years: Team
- 1870–1885: Hampshire
- 1880–1881: Marylebone Cricket Club

Career statistics
Competition	First-class
Matches	30
Runs scored	876
Batting average	17.87
100s/50s	–/6
Top score	82
Balls bowled	28
Wickets	–
Bowling average	–
5 wickets in innings	–
10 wickets in match	–
Best bowling	–
Catches/stumpings	25/5
- Source: Cricinfo, 25 August 2009

Arthur Hardy Wood JP (25 May 1844 — 10 September 1933) was an English first-class cricketer.

The third son of the industrialist John Wood, he was born in May 1844 at Thedden Grange in Bentworth, Hampshire. Wood was educated at Eton College, but did not play for the college cricket eleven. Wood made his debut in first-class cricket for Hampshire against Lancashire at Old Trafford in 1870. He played six times in first-class cricket for Hampshire in the 1870s, and was appointed Hampshire's third captain in 1879 (though Hampshire played no first-class matches in that season). He was replaced as captain by Russell Bencraft the following season, but did captain Hampshire again, this time in first-class matches between 1883 and 1885, being Hampshire's final captain before their first-class status was revoked at the end of the 1885 season. In total, Wood played 28 first-class matches for Hampshire as a wicket-keeper. In these, he scored 849 runs at an average of 18.45; he made six half centuries, with a highest score of 82. As wicket-keeper, he took 23 catches and made five stumpings. In addition to playing for Hampshire, Wood also made two first-class appearances for the Marylebone Cricket Club in 1880 and 1881. In 1886, he was elected president of Hampshire County Cricket Club and was its vice-president the remainder of his life.

Outside of cricket, Wood was a justice of the peace for Hampshire. He was well known in hunting circles in Hampshire, becoming Master of the Hounds for the Hampshire Hunt in 1884, in addition to serving as its secretary. Later moving to Uckfield in Sussex, Wood became associated with Sussex County Cricket Club, serving as its vice president and was for many years a member of its committee. He died in Hove in September 1933. He was married three times during his life. His son, also called Arthur, played first-class cricket while serving with the Royal Navy.

Sporting positions
Preceded by Clement Booth; Russell Bencraft	Hampshire cricket captain 1879; 1883–1885	Succeeded by Russell Bencraft; Russell Bencraft
