= 1903 County Championship =

English cricket tournament

- Cricket format: First-class cricket (3 days)
- Tournament format: League system
- Champions: Middlesex (1st title)
- Participants: 15
- Most runs: C. B. Fry (2,413 for Sussex)
- Most wickets: Wilfred Rhodes (143 for Yorkshire)

Location of the home ground of each county

The 1903 County Championship was the 14th officially organised running of the County Championship, and ran from 4 May to 3 September 1903. Middlesex won their first championship title, ending Yorkshire's run of three successive titles. Sussex finished in second place for the second successive season.

== Table ==
- One point was awarded for a win, and one point was taken away for each loss. Final placings were decided by dividing the number of points earned by the number of completed matches (i.e. those that ended in a win or a loss), and multiplying by 100.

Team	Pld	W	L	D	A	Pts	Fin	%Fin
Middlesex	18	8	1	7	2	7	9	77.77
Sussex	24	7	2	14	1	5	9	55.55
Yorkshire	26	13	5	8	0	8	18	44.44
Lancashire	26	10	5	11	0	3	15	33.33
Nottinghamshire	20	6	4	10	0	2	10	20.00
Worcestershire	20	8	6	6	0	2	14	14.28
Warwickshire	18	5	4	9	0	1	9	11.11
Essex	22	7	6	7	2	1	13	7.69
Kent	22	7	6	7	2	1	13	7.69
Somerset	18	6	6	5	1	0	12	0.00
Surrey	28	7	11	9	1	–4	18	–22.22
Derbyshire	16	4	7	5	0	–3	11	–27.27
Gloucestershire	20	3	10	7	0	–7	13	–53.84
Hampshire	18	1	10	4	3	–9	11	–81.81
Leicestershire	18	1	10	4	3	–9	11	–81.81

== Records ==
=== Batting ===
Most runs
Aggregate	Average	Player	County
2,413	80.43	C. B. Fry	Sussex
1,618	44.94	Johnny Tyldesley	Lancashire
1,565	40.12	Archie MacLaren	Lancashire
1,449	34.50	Ernie Hayes	Surrey
1,428	44.62	Percy Perrin	Essex

=== Bowling ===
Most wickets
Aggregate	Average	Player	County
143	14.72	Wilfred Rhodes	Yorkshire
137	13.05	Charlie Blythe	Kent
131	17.85	Sydney Barnes	Lancashire
123	12.17	Sam Hargreave	Warwickshire
115	12.79	George Hirst	Yorkshire
