= Winchester F.C. =

Former association football club in England

Winchester F. C.
- Full name: Winchester Football Club
- Nickname: the Wintonians
- Founded: 1884
- Dissolved: 1893
- Ground: Cricket Ground
- Secretary: Arnold Tebbutt, B. H. Wooldridge
Home colours

The Winchester Football Club was an English football team based in Winchester, Hampshire.

== History ==
Winchester Football Club was at a meeting at the Royal Hotel, Winchester, on 11 November 1884. The club reached the final of the Hampshire Senior Cup competition in 1887–88, losing 2–0 to Woolston Works at the County Ground, Southampton; Winchester had been handicapped by the loss of captain Wooldridge on business, with honorary secretary Tebbutt having to step in, and the first Woolston goal followed a handball which the referee noted, but as no Wintonian appealed, the referee could not award a foul. It was the only defeat the club suffered all season, other than two defeats for incomplete XIs, and Winchester gained some measure of revenge by beating Woolston 2–1 on Easter Monday 1888.

The club folded in July 1893, owing to a lack of playing members. Another Winchester club, Winchester Swallows F.C., changed its name to Winchester F.C. in 1894. It was this club that became Winchester City F.C. in 1908.

== Ground ==
The club played at the Winchester Cricket Ground and used the Red Lion for its facilities.

== Club Honours ==
=== Cup honours ===
- Hampshire Senior Cup
  - Runners Up: 1887–88
