= William Findlay (cricketer, born 1880) =

English cricketer and administrator (1880–1953)

William Findlay

William Findlay (22 June 1880 – 19 June 1953) was an English cricketer and administrator.

== Life ==
Findlay was born in Liverpool, and educated at Eton and Oriel College, Oxford. Between 1901 and 1906 he played 88 matches of first-class cricket for Lancashire and Oxford University as a batsman and wicket-keeper. He scored 1,984 runs at an average of 19.45, and made 140 catches and 27 stumpings.

When Albert Chevallier Tayler was preparing his painting, Kent vs Lancashire at Canterbury he arranged sittings with the Kent team. Tayler also intended to do the same with the non-striking Lancashire batsman, Harry Makepeace. Makepeace however was unable to attend a sitting, so Tayler compromised by using Findlay as the batsman. Findlay had not played in that match in 1906, but he was able to travel to Tayler's London studio as he had just been appointed as secretary of Surrey County Cricket Club after his retirement as a cricket player at the end of 1906.

Findlay was secretary at Surrey County Cricket Club from 1907 until 1920, when he was appointed as assistant secretary to Sir Francis Lacey at the Marylebone Cricket Club at Lord's; he succeeded Lacey as secretary in 1926 and served until 1936. In 1937 he led the commission that investigated the difficulties that many counties had in competing in the County Championship. He was president of MCC in 1951–52. He was renowned, said his obituary notice in Wisden, for his "genial, diplomatic manner and never-failing courtesy".

Findlay died at his home in Tenterden, Kent, in June 1953, after a heart attack.
