= Hampshire County Cricket Club =

Cricket club in England

- One Day name: Hampshire
- Twenty20 name: Hampshire Hawks

Personnel
- Captain: Ben Brown
- One Day captain: Nick Gubbins (LA); James Vince (T20)
- Coach: TBA
- Overseas player: Kyle Abbott

Team information
- Colours
- Founded: 1863
- Home ground: Utilita Bowl
- Capacity: 15,000

History
- First-class debut: Sussex in 1864 at Antelope Ground, Southampton
- Championship wins: 2
- Sunday/National League/CB40/YB40 wins: 3
- Friends Provident Trophy/RLODC wins: 5
- T20/FLT20/NT20B wins: 3
- B&H Cup wins: 2
First-class
One-day
T20

Hampshire County Cricket Club is one of eighteen first-class county clubs within the domestic cricket structure of England and Wales. It represents the historic county of Hampshire. Hampshire teams formed by earlier organisations, principally the Hambledon Club, always had first-class status and the same applied to the county club when it was founded in 1863. Because of poor performances for several seasons until 1885, Hampshire then lost its status for nine seasons until it was invited into the County Championship in 1895, since when the team have played in every top-level domestic cricket competition in England. Hampshire originally played at the Antelope Ground, Southampton until 1885 when they relocated to the County Ground, Southampton until 2000, before moving to the purpose-built Rose Bowl in West End, which is in the Borough of Eastleigh on the north east outskirts of Southampton. The club has twice won the County Championship, in the 1961 and 1973 seasons.

Hampshire played their first one-day match in the 1963 Gillette Cup, but did not win their first one-day silverware until 1975 when they won the Sunday League which it won twice more, in 1978 and 1986. It has twice won the Benson & Hedges Cup, in 1988 and 1992; the Natwest Trophy in 1991; the Cheltenham & Gloucester Trophy once in 2005 and the Friends Provident Trophy once in 2009. Having first played Twenty20 cricket in 2003, Hampshire won the Friends Provident t20 in 2010. The County Championship was restructured in 2000, and at the end of the 2002 Hampshire was relegated for the first time. The club remained in the second division for three seasons and since 2004 had competed in the top tier. However, the club was relegated once more in 2011. The club won both the Friends Life t20 and ECB 40 in 2012, but it wasn't until 2014 before they were promoted to the first division again. They narrowly avoided relegation in 2015 before being relegated again in 2016, only to be reprieved after Durham were relegated after taking ECB sanctions to secure their future. In 2018 the club won the Royal London One-Day Cup and in 2022 won their third t20 tournament when they secured the T20 Blast. Subject to ratification by the England and Wales Cricket Board, in 2024 a £120 million deal was agreed to sell the club to Indian Premier League franchise Delhi Capitals, including a 51% stake in the Hundred team Southern Brave.

Phil Mead is the club's leading run-scorer with 48,892 runs in 700 matches for Hampshire between 1905 and 1936. Fast bowler Derek Shackleton took 2,669 wickets in 583 first-class matches between 1948 and 1969 which remains a club record. Alec Kennedy, whose career lasted from 1907 to 1936, was the first player to score 10,000 runs and take 1,000 wickets for Hampshire. Colin Ingleby-Mackenzie was both Hampshire's last amateur captain and first professional captain.

== Honours ==
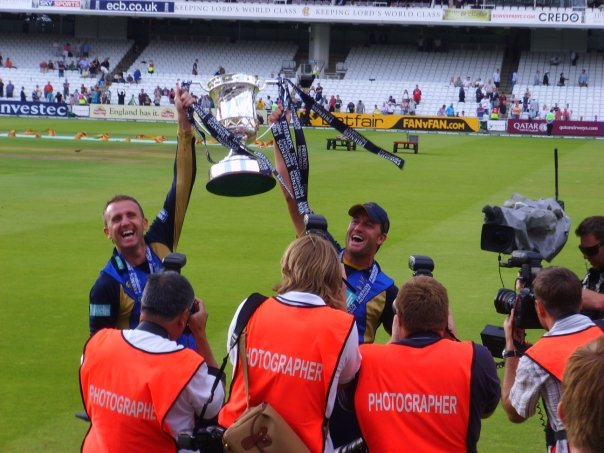
Dominic Cork (left) and Sean Ervine hold aloft the 2009 Friends Provident Trophy

=== First XI honours ===
- County Championship (2) – 1961, 1973
  - Division Two (1) – 2014
- Gillette/NatWest/C&G/Friends Provident Trophy/CB40/RLODC (5) – 1991, 2005, 2009, 2012, 2018
- Twenty20 Cup (3) – 2010, 2012, 2022
- Sunday/National League (3) – 1975, 1978, 1986
- Benson & Hedges Cup (2) – 1988, 1992

=== Second XI honours ===
- Second XI Championship (6) – 1967, 1971, 1981, 1995, 2001, 2019
- Second XI Trophy (1) – 2003, 2008

== History ==
=== Earliest cricket ===
A poem written in Latin by Robert Matthew in 1647 contains a probable reference to cricket being played by pupils of Winchester College on nearby St. Catherine's Hill. If authentic, this is the earliest known mention of cricket in Hampshire. But, with the sport having originated in Saxon or Norman times on the Weald, it is likely to have reached what is now modern Hampshire long before 1647. In 1680, lines written in an old Bible invite "All you that do delight in Cricket, come to Marden, pitch your wickets". Marden is in Sussex, north of Chichester, and close to Hambledon, which is just across the county boundary in Hampshire. Hampshire is used in a team name for the first time in August 1729, when a combined Hampshire, Surrey and Sussex XI played against Kent.

=== Hambledon and after ===
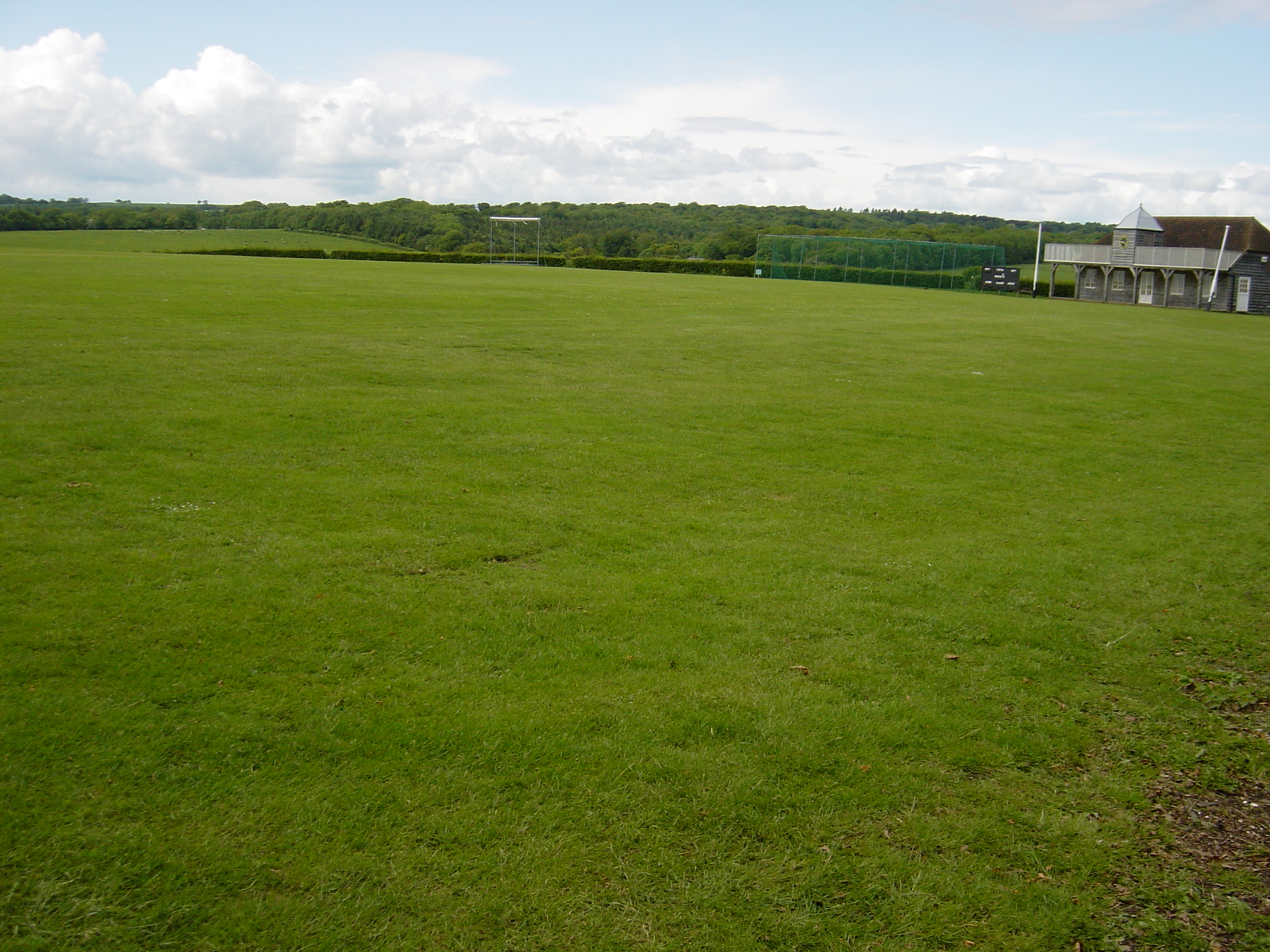
Broadhalfpenny Down, the original ground of the Hambledon Club

The origin of the legendary Hambledon Club is lost. There remains no definite knowledge of Hambledon cricket before 1756, when its team had gained sufficient repute to be capable of attempting three matches against Dartford, itself a famous club since the 1720s if not earlier. Hambledon had presumably earned recognition as the best parish team in Hampshire, but no reports of their local matches have been found. We do not know when the Hambledon Club was founded and it seems likely that some kind of parish organisation was operating in 1756, although there may well have been a patron involved. The Sussex v Hampshire match in June 1766 is the earliest reference to Hampshire as an individual county team. Whether the Hambledon Club was involved is unrecorded but presumably it was. Some historians believe it was at about this time that the club, as distinct from a parish organisation, was founded. The Hambledon Club was in many respects a Hampshire county club for it organised Hampshire matches, although it was a multi-functional club and not dedicated to cricket alone. Its membership attracted large numbers of sporting gentry and it dominated the sport, both on and off the field, for about thirty years until the formation of Marylebone Cricket Club in 1787. Hambledon produced some legendary Hampshire players including master batsman John Small and the two great fast bowlers Thomas Brett and David Harris. Following the demise of the Hambledon Club towards the end of the 18th century, Hampshire continued to be recognised as a first-class team into the nineteenth century but, after the 1828 season, they had long spells without any first-class matches until the county club was founded in 1864. The county played some first-class fixtures during 1842 to 1845 and one match versus MCC in 1861 but was otherwise outside cricket's mainstream through 1829 to 1863.

=== Origin of club ===
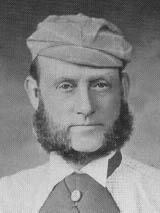
James Southerton, who played in the first ever Test match

Hampshire County Cricket Club was founded on 12 August 1863 and played its first first-class match against Sussex at the Antelope Ground, Southampton on 7 and 8 July 1864. Sussex won by 10 wickets with James Lillywhite claiming ten wickets in the match for 80 runs, including his 100th career wicket. Hampshire was recognised as a first-class team from 1864 to 1885. In 1886, Hampshire lost its status after years of difficult circumstances and poor results. The team did play against Surrey and Sussex in 1886 but the matches were considered minor standard. Hampshire recovered first-class status from the beginning of the 1895 County Championship season when the team was invited to join the now official County Championship. They finished the season in tenth place, sixteen points behind winners Surrey.

=== 20th century ===
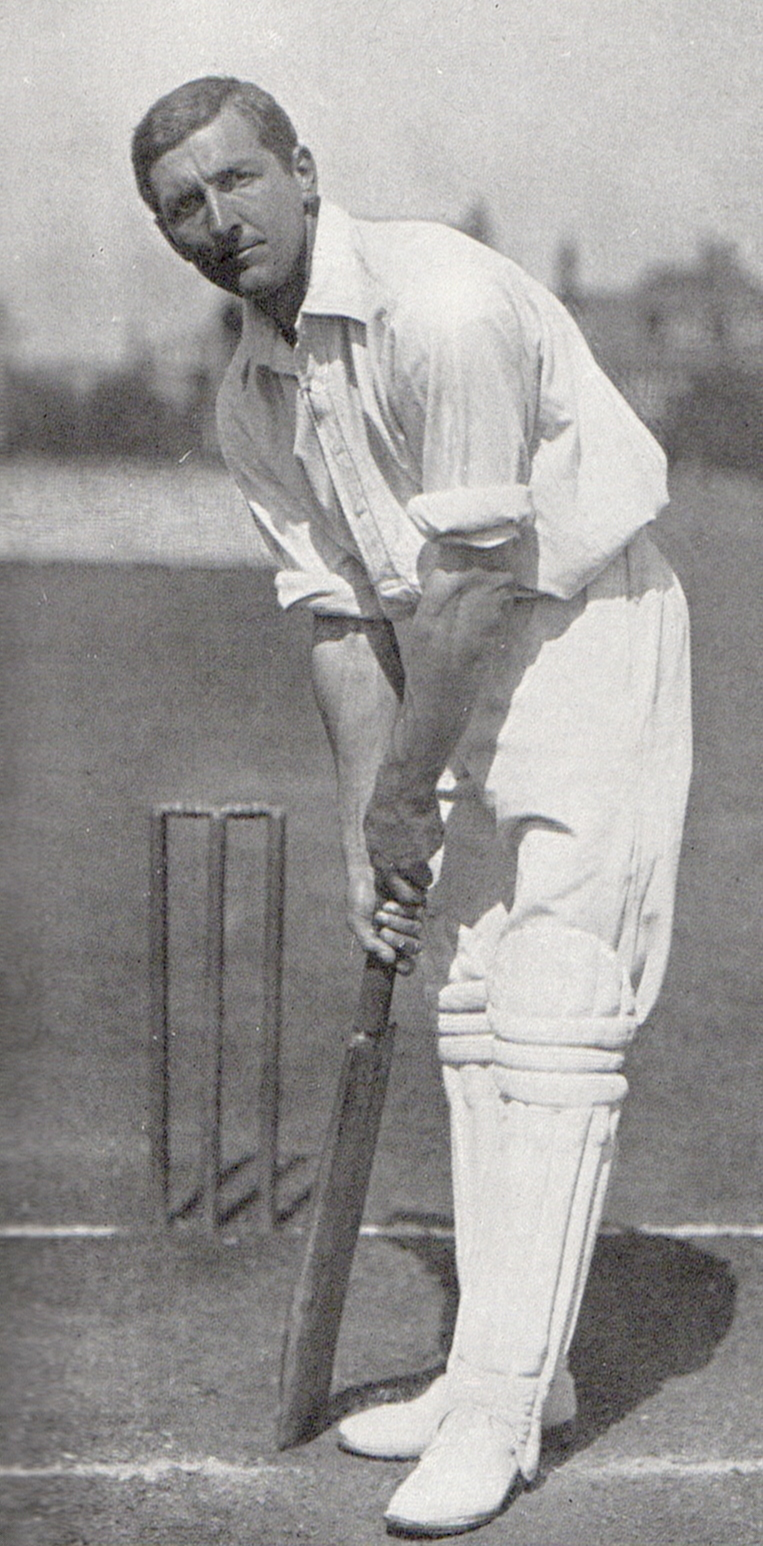
C.B. Fry, who represented Hampshire between 1909 and 1921

Between 1900 and 1905, Hampshire were almost continuously struggling as their key officer-batsmen, Major Robert Poore and Captain Teddy Wynyard were faced with either moving to South Africa or increased military duties at home from the Boer War. The club finished last or equal last in 1900, 1902, 1903, 1904 and 1905, failing to win a single game in the first of those seasons; however in 1901, with the temporary acquisition of Captain Greig from India and the qualification of Charlie Llewellyn, Hampshire won as many games as it lost. From 1906 onwards, with the qualification of Phil Mead, Jack Newman and later George Brown, Hampshire became a much more competitive side, though not until 1910 did they win as many games as they lost in a season.

The period from 1912 to 1926, though they never got near County Championship honours, was to be the most successful for a long time in Hampshire's history: in those eleven seasons they won 98 and lost 96 of 292 games – only once otherwise until 1954 did they win more games than they lost. Mead, Brown, Kennedy and Newman were in the prime during this period, and they had the services of Lord Tennyson who captained the side from 1919 to 1932 as well as captaining the England team in three Tests, and the occasional aid of many other amateurs including the great C. B. Fry, who averaged an amazing 102 in seven games during 1912. In 1922, Hampshire won one of the most remarkable victories in County Championship history when, they defeated Warwickshire by 155 runs after having followed on when dismissed for just 15. They scored 521 after being invited to bat again, set Warwickshire 314 to win and bowled them out for 158. Brown, with 172, and Livsey who scored 110* at number 10, were the heroes.

From 1927, Hampshire declined severely as their stalwart professionals declined and the level of amateur support fell off alarmingly. Only in 1932 and 1948 did they finish above tenth until 1955. With Stuart Boyes and Lofty Herman not fully adequate replacements as bowling mainstays for Kennedy and Newman, the bowling was never strong, and the batting generally uncertain especially when Mead declined from 1929 onwards. In 1937 Dick Moore set the individual scoring record for Hampshire against Warwickshire at Dean Park Cricket Ground in Bournemouth. His 316 took just 380 minutes and contained 43 fours and three sixes. After World War II, Derek Shackleton became an outstanding bowling mainstay well backed up by Victor Cannings, but not until 1955 did these two have enough support to rise the fortunes of the club. In 1955 Hampshire finished as high as third with Shackleton taking 160 wickets and Cannings and Peter Sainsbury around 100, with Roy Marshall was one of the few exciting batsmen of the time.

The following years were mixed: a rise to second in 1958 with Malcolm Heath replacing Cannings as Shackleton's partner was followed by two disappointing years before Hampshire won the 1961 County Championship, their first ever County Championship success, finishing the season with 268 points, 18 ahead of Yorkshire. Hampshire won 19 of their 32 matches, losing only seven matches all season. The club were led by Colin Ingleby-Mackenzie with Marshall scoring the most runs for the club with 2,455. Derek Shackleton took the most wickets for the club with 153, and Butch White's tearaway speed was equally dangerous in a dry summer.

Again, however, Hampshire were disappointing until Barry Richards joined the county in 1968, when they rose from tenth to fifth in the Championship and established themselves as a power in limited-overs cricket. Bob Cottam was the second-highest first-class wicket-taker in 1968 and the highest in 1969, but did not maintain this excellence before joining Northamptonshire and in 1970 and 1971 Hampshire fell to mid-table. In the 1973 County Championship Hampshire won the County Championship for a second time, winning the competition by 31 points from Surrey. The club won 10 of their 20 matches and drew the other 10. During this season they were led by Richard Gilliat with Gordon Greenidge scoring the most runs for the club with 1,620. Bob Herman and Mike Taylor both took 63 wickets. This remains Hampshire's last success in the tournament. In 1979 West Indian Malcolm Marshall, widely regarded as one of the best bowlers to grace the game joined the club. This was to be the start of a 14-year stay with the club. During that time Marshall would go on to take 824 first-class wickets at an average of 18.64 and 239 wickets at 24.88 in one-day cricket. 1984 also saw the last game of Venezuelan captain Nick Pocock (Maracaibo, 1951) and the arrival of another West Indian, Cardigan Connor who would spend 14 years with the club. Regarded as one of the best players not to play Test cricket, Connor took 614 first-class wickets for Hampshire at an average of 31.74 and 411 wickets at 25.07 in one-day cricket. In 1985 Hampshire finished second in the County Championship, finishing 18 points behind winners Middlesex. Chris Smith led the way with the bat, scoring 1,720 runs. and was well backed up by the bowling of Malcolm Marshall who took 95 wickets at the impressive average of 17.68. Later in, 1988 the club won the Benson & Hedges Cup by beating Derbyshire by 7 wickets at Lord's, largely thanks to a five wicket haul by Stephen Jefferies. The 1990s brought about further success in the first half of the decade, and later struggles in the latter half. In the 1991 County Championship season Hampshire won the NatWest Trophy, defeating Surrey by 4 wickets, with Shaun Udal claiming the man of the match award. This was the clubs first one day honour in this competition. Hampshire again repeated their 1988 success in the Benson & Hedges Cup by winning the 1992 competition. In the final at Lord's they beat Kent by 41 runs, including 90 runs from Robin Smith and three wickets each from Malcolm Marshall and Shaun Udal. This marked Hampshire's second success in the competition. In 1996 Malcolm Marshall returned to coach the club. In 1997 work begun on Hampshire's long-awaited new ground. The realisation of this move almost led the club to financial ruin, as encouragement from financial partners Sport England and the hiring of architect Sir Michael Hopkins had led the then part-time voluntary committee running the club to lose control of the budget.

=== 21st century ===
In 2000 Australian great Shane Warne was signed as the club's overseas player. The 2000 County Championship was to be the last season that Hampshire would play at the County Ground Southampton before they moved in 2001 to the new Rose Bowl ground just outside Southampton. 2001 also saw current club chairman take over the running of the club, after a period of financial difficulty. In the 2002 County Championship Hampshire were relegated back to Division Two, finishing third bottom in Division One. It was during this season that the club signed former England batsman John Crawley from Lancashire. In the 2003 season Hampshire and England great Robin Smith retired from all forms of cricket after 23 years with the club. In 2005, Hampshire performed well in both first-class and one-day forms of the game. The side narrowly missed out on winning the County Championship Division 1 by just 2.5 points to Nottinghamshire. In the 2005 Cheltenham & Gloucester Trophy Hampshire progressed to the final thanks to a century in the semi-final against Yorkshire by Sean Ervine. In the final at Lord's against Warwickshire Ervine repeated the feat scoring 104 runs as Hampshire won by 18 runs; Hampshire's first silverware in 13 years. Two years later, Hampshire progressed to the final of the newly renamed 2007 Friends Provident Trophy at Lord's after finishing top of the South Division. In the final the club played Durham where they lost by 125 runs as the match went into a reserve day due to rain. In 2007 Hampshire chairman Rod Bransgrove announced plans for the redevelopment of the Rose Bowl to bring Test cricket to the ground. Prior to the 2008 County Championship season Australian legend and club captain Shane Warne reiterated his commitment to the club. But shortly before the start of the season Warne announced his retirement from first-class cricket.

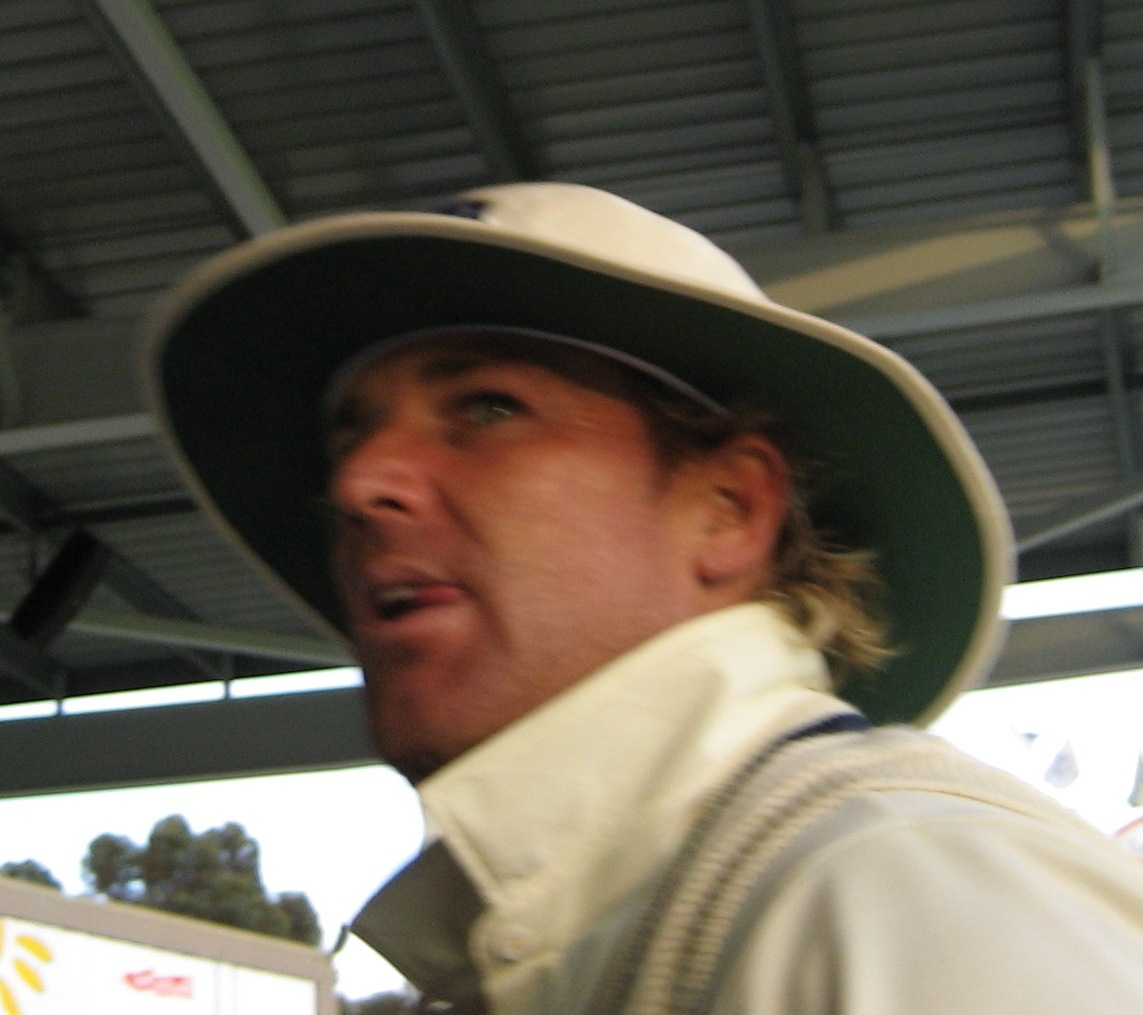
Former captain Shane Warne

Former captain Shaun Udal also announced his retirement, having played for Hampshire since 1989, though he later joined Middlesex. Dimitri Mascarenhas was named Warne's replacement as captain for the 2008 season. In 2008, Hampshire struggled and were near the foot of the Division 1 table for the majority of the season. Midway through the season coach Paul Terry stood down and was replaced by Giles White. A series of strong performances helped Hampshire go from relegation favourites to title outsiders going into the final round of matches. The club ended up finishing in third place, twelve points behind winners Durham. On 25 July the club won the 2009 Friends Provident Trophy final at Lord's, beating rivals Sussex thanks to a man-of-the-match performance from Dominic Cork, with him taking 4/41. Hampshire created history by winning the 2010 Friends Provident t20 in front of home support after defeating Somerset – the first team to win a Twenty20 trophy on home turf in England and Wales. On 14 September 2011, in their four-day game against Warwickshire at The Rose Bowl, Hampshire were officially relegated to the County Championship Second Division. The 2012 season though, under new captain Jimmy Adams after the retirement of Cork, would prove to be highly successful for Hampshire with the county winning both the 2012 Friends Life t20 – their 2nd Twenty20 title, and the 2012 Clydesdale Bank 40 where a final ball dot ball from Kabir Ali led to Hampshire winning as a result of losing less wickets than opponents Warwickshire. Club legend Dimitri Mascarenhas played in both finals but retired at the end of the 2013 season.

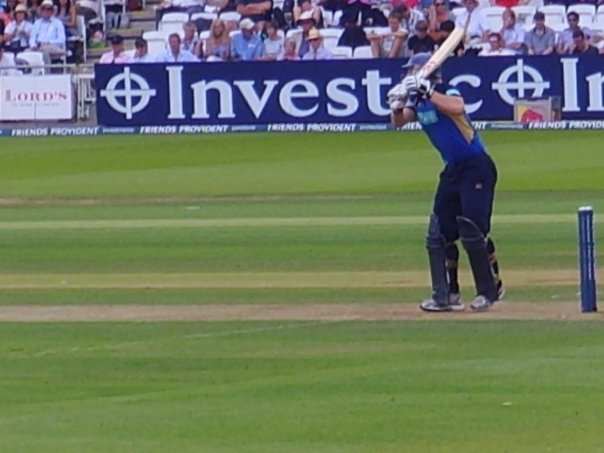
Former captain Jimmy Adams batting against Sussex in the final of the 2009 Friends Provident Trophy at Lord's. Adams scored 19,723 runs in all formats for Hampshire.

However, despite constant success in limited overs cricket the county continued to struggle in First class cricket leading to coach Giles White moving into a Director of Cricket position and Dale Benkenstein being appointed the new coach at the beginning of 2014. He brought instant success as Hampshire won promotion as champions to the County Championship First Division with victory over Glamorgan on 23 September 2014. The 2015 season was reasonable successful with Hampshire qualifying for a record 6th successive Twenty20 Finals Day, however their First class performances at the beginning of the season were poor leading to Adams' resignation as captain. James Vince took over as captain, having already become List A and T20 captain previously, and led a revival as Hampshire won four of their last five games, meaning that Hampshire completed the 'Great Escape' as victory over Nottinghamshire in their final games thanks to 10 wickets from West Indian Fidel Edwards, and Yorkshire's victory over Sussex meant that Sussex and Worcestershire were relegated to Division Two with Hampshire staying up.

In the winter of 2015 Hampshire completed the signing of England seamer Reece Topley from Essex. The club also announced that Fidel Edwards had signed a new deal and South African all rounder Ryan McLaren had signed as an overseas player. On 14 January 2016, Hampshire Cricket was announced as one of six new teams in the inaugural Women's Cricket Super League. Hampshire, in partnership with Berkshire, Dorset, Isle of Wight, Oxfordshire, Sussex and Wiltshire cricket boards along with Southampton Solent University, will compete in a women's Twenty20 competition against the other team. On 28 January 2016 Hampshire appointed former Wiltshire coach Nick Denning as their inaugural coach for their Women's team. Following the appointment of Denning, Hampshire announced the naming of their Women's Cricket Super League team as the Southern Vipers. The Vipers then won the inaugural Kia Super League on 21 August, defeating Western Force in the final by 7 wickets. Overseas star Suzie Bates was named as player of the tournament. For the male team though it was a season of disappointment. A large number of injuries at the start of the season, including to fast bowlers Reece Topley, Fidel Edwards, Chris Wood and Ryan Stevenson, coupled with poor form and tough circumstances, after the death of trialist fast bowler Hamza Ali in a drowning accident, and long serving opening batsman Michael Carberry being diagnosed with a cancerous lung tumour, saw Hampshire suffer a poor season, being knocked out in the group stages of both the Natwest t20 Blast, where they missed out on Finals Day for the first time since 2009, and the Royal London One-Day Cup. Their championship season was much the same as in 2015, again making a slow start, but they gave themselves too much to do and were relegated back to Division Two after defeat against Durham on 23 September 2016. However, on 3 October 2016 Hampshire were given a reprieve as Durham were relegated to Division Two after taking up a financial package from the ECB to help with their finances, with their relegation and a points deduction being the fine for taking this agreement. Coach Dale Benkenstein departed as coach for 'Personal Reasons' in mid-July and was replaced by Craig White originally in a caretaker role, before taking over as full-time first team coach in November. At the end of the season, long serving seamer James Tomlinson retired having been with Hampshire since 2002 and making over 150 appearances in all formats for Hampshire. The Winter of 2017 saw Hampshire draw criticism over the signings of Kyle Abbott and Rilee Rossouw on Kolpak deals, with these players giving up international cricket to represent Hampshire. On the field Hampshire again had a mixed season in first class cricket, avoiding relegation for the 3rd season in a row by drawing against already relegated Warwickshire meaning relegation for Middlesex, with Kolpak Abbott taking 60 wickets across the First-class season. In List A cricket Hampshire again missed out on the knockout stages. However Hampshire performed better in Twenty20 cricket, qualifying for their 7th Finals Day in 8 years, although they lost in the semi-final to eventual winners Nottinghamshire. They also recorded their highest Twenty20 score in their quarter-final victory over Derbyshire scoring 249–8, with Pakistan overseas player Shahid Afridi scoring a century.

2018 saw improved performances in first-class cricket as Hampshire secured their Division One status before the final day for the first time since promotion in 2014. Kolpak stars Kyle Abbott and Fidel Edwards both taking more than 50 wickets in the season but it was in List A cricket where Hampshire were most successful, winning the 2018 Royal London One-Day Cup, with a century in the final at Lord's by Rilee Rossouw. Hampshire though performed poorly in Twenty20 cricket finishing 2nd bottom of the South group. Overseas player Mujeeb Ur Rahman though became the first Afghan to play for Hampshire, and the first player to be born in the 21st century to play for Hampshire. Long time players Jimmy Adams and Sean Ervine though retired at the end of the 2018 season having amassed more than 35,000 runs in all formats between them for Hampshire, while coach Craig White also departed after two seasons as head coach, and was replaced by South African Adrian Birrell in December.

2019 again saw strong performance in first-class cricket as Hampshire finished 3rd in the County Championship, their highest finish in over 10 years. Kyle Abbott once again was leading wicket taker, while also taking the best Hampshire bowling figures in a match when he took 17/86 against Somerset in September. Ajinkya Rahane also became the first Indian player to represent Hampshire during an overseas spell in June. Hampshire once again also made the 2019 Royal London One-Day Cup final, however this year they were defeated in the final by Somerset. There was though success for Hampshire academy graduates James Vince and Liam Dawson as they were part of England's victorious World Cup winning side. Hampshire, though, again failed to progress from the group in T20 cricket. The following 2020 season was heavily disrupted by the COVID-19 pandemic with only a shortened localised red ball tournament and T20 played. Hampshire, missing a large number of players to injury, international selection and travel restrictions, struggled winning just two red ball and two white ball games. A large number of young academy players though made their debuts while James Fuller took a hat-trick in a first-class game against Surrey, while overseas player Shaheen Afridi took four wickets in four balls in the final T20 match of the season against Middlesex. West Indian fast bowler Fidel Edwards announced his departure during the season due to not being able to travel due to the restrictions around COVID-19 and the impending change to the Kolpak ruling, after taking over 200 wickets in all formats. 2021 saw a return to the traditional County Championship, although in a differing format, with Hampshire missing out on their first County Championship title since 1973 following a loss to Lancashire in the final match of the season. In Twenty20 cricket, Hampshire made Finals Day following a dramatic 2 run win over Nottinghamshire in the quarter-final, but lost to Somerset in the semi-finals. Hampshire's List A side was depleted due to The Hundred competition being played alongside the One Day Cup competition. With Hampshire missing 7 players to The Hundred, they missed out on the playoffs, although a number of young players were given the opportunity to play. Individually, Keith Barker won Hampshire's Players Player of the Year, while fellow bowler, overseas international Mohammad Abbas picked up a hat-trick in the County Championship against Middlesex.

In 2022, Hampshire continued their upturn in County Championship form, throughout the season having an outside shot at a first title since 1973, but lost their final two games, eventually finishing third in Division One. This was mainly due to the fantastic form shown by Mohammad Abbas, Kyle Abbott and Keith Barker, who all took fifty wickets in the season. Despite losing a number of players to The Hundred again, Hampshire topped their group in the One Day Cup, with young batter Tom Prest hitting Hampshire's second highest ever individual list A score, with 181 against Kent. They would, however, lose to the same opposition at the semi-final stage. The T20 Blast saw the signings of Australian pair Ben McDermott and Nathan Ellis, and the duo helped Hampshire to a third T20 title, with a narrow one-run victory over Lancashire in the final.

The 2023 season saw Hampshire finish third in the County Championship for the second consecutive year, with captain James Vince passing 1000 runs and Mohammad Abbas taking over 50 wickets again. In a match against Middlesex, Liam Dawson became only the fourth Hampshire player, the first since 1901, to score a century and take ten wickets in the same match. Hampshire again progressed in the One Day Cup, only losing one match in the group stage, but fell to a narrow defeat in the final against Leicestershire. Fast bowler John Turner helped Hampshire to a third successive Finals Day, but they were beaten by Essex in the semi-final. In 2024, Hampshire had to settle for second place in the County Championship; having been winless in the first five matches, they went unbeaten for the rest of the year, with 50-wicket hauls for Kyle Abbott and Liam Dawson, who repeated his impressive feat from the previous year against Lancashire. Hampshire again progressed from their One Day Cup group, a campaign which saw 18-year-old Dominic Kelly take a hat-trick against Derbyshire, but were again beaten by Leicestershire, this time at the quarter-final stage. However, Hampshire struggled in T20 cricket, finishing 7th in the South Group and missing out on Finals Day for the first time since 2020.

In September 2024 it was announced that the club has agreed to a deal with the GMR Group, that will take over of the club. Hampshire were part of the inaugural Global Super League in Guyana, winning a match against Rangpur Riders of Bangladesh, that went to a super over. In early 2025, long-standing captain James Vince announced he would not play red-ball cricket for Hampshire in 2025 and Ben Brown was confirmed as Hampshire's new Club Captain. Hampshire's side faced lots of disruption due to injuries and overseas callups, and they struggled for form in the County Championship, narrowly avoiding relegation on the final day owing to Durham's defeat at Yorkshire. Kyle Abbott, however, had another excellent season in which he exceeded 50 wickets. Hampshire reached the Final of the One Day Cup, built upon their fruitful opening partnership of captain Nick Gubbins and Ali Orr, losing in a rain-affected match to Worcestershire. Gubbins' tournament average of 88.37 was the highest in Hampshire's history. Hampshire returned to Finals Day again, and Chris Lynn hit the first ever century on Finals Day in Hampshire's semi-final win over Northamptonshire, but they lost in the final to Somerset. However, positive campaigns for Sonny Baker and Scott Currie saw them receive their first England call-ups. In September 2025, it was confirmed that Adrian Birrell would leave his position as head coach after seven years.

In December 2025, Hampshire announced that Birrell would be replaced by former South Africa and Bangladesh head coach Russell Domingo, with Shane Burger and Jimmy Adams his assistants.

== Players ==
=== Current squad ===
- No. denotes the player's squad number, as worn on the back of their shirt.
- ‡ denotes players with international caps.
- * denotes a player who has been awarded a county cap.

No.	Name	Nat.	Birth date	Batting style	Bowling style	Notes
Batters
5	Joe Weatherley*	England	19 January 1997 (age 29)	Right-handed	Right-arm off break	
14	James Vince* ‡	England	14 March 1991 (age 35)	Right-handed	Right-arm medium	Captain (T20); White ball contract
15	Toby Albert	England	12 November 2001 (age 24)	Right-handed	Right-arm off break	
19	Fletcha Middleton	England	21 January 2002 (age 24)	Right-handed	Right-arm off break	
21	Ben Mayes	England	21 November 2007 (age 18)	Right-handed	Right-arm medium	
31	Nick Gubbins*	England	31 December 1993 (age 32)	Left-handed	Right-arm leg break	Captain (LA)
33	Jake Lehmann	Australia	8 July 1992 (age 34)	Left-handed	Slow left-arm orthodox	UK passport
—	Rishi Patel	England	26 July 1998 (age 28)	Right-handed	Right-arm leg break	
All-rounders
3	Felix Organ	England	2 June 1999 (age 27)	Right-handed	Right-arm off break	
8	Liam Dawson* ‡	England	1 March 1990 (age 36)	Right-handed	Slow left-arm orthodox	England central contract; White ball contract
17	Andrew Neal	England	11 October 1999 (age 27)	Right-handed	Slow left-arm orthodox	
24	Tom Prest	England	24 March 2003 (age 23)	Right-handed	Right-arm off break	
26	James Fuller*	England	24 January 1990 (age 36)	Right-handed	Right-arm fast-medium	
—	Fynn Hudson-Prentice	England	12 January 1996 (age 30)	Right-handed	Right-arm fast-medium	
—	Saif Zaib	England	22 May 1998 (age 28)	Left-handed	Slow left-arm orthodox	
Wicket-keepers
10	Ben Brown*	England	23 November 1988 (age 37)	Right-handed	Slow left-arm orthodox	Club captain
Bowlers
25	Chris Wood*	England	27 June 1990 (age 36)	Right-handed	Left-arm fast-medium	White ball contract
43	Manny Lumsden	England	3 November 2008 (age 18)	Right-handed	Right-arm fast-medium	
44	Scott Currie ‡	Scotland	2 May 2001 (age 25)	Right-handed	Right-arm fast-medium	
87	Kyle Abbott* ‡	South Africa	18 June 1987 (age 39)	Right-handed	Right-arm fast-medium	Overseas player
91	Eddie Jack	England	9 September 2005 (age 21)	Left-handed	Right-arm fast-medium	England development contract
95	Sonny Baker ‡	England	13 March 2003 (age 23)	Right-handed	Right-arm fast	England central contract
Source: Updated: 27 September 2026

=== Current & former players ===
- List of Hampshire County Cricket Club first-class players
- List of Hampshire County Cricket Club List A players
- List of Hampshire County Cricket Club Twenty20 players

=== International players ===
- List of international cricketers from Hampshire

=== Captains ===
- 2025– Ben Brown
- 2015–2024 James Vince
- 2012–2015 Jimmy Adams
- 2010–2011 Dominic Cork
- 2008–2009 Dimitri Mascarenhas
- 2004–2007 Shane Warne
- 2003 John Crawley
- 1998–2002 Robin Smith
- 1996–1997 John Stephenson
- 1985–1995 Mark Nicholas
- 1980–1984 Nick Pocock
- 1979 Bob Stephenson
- 1971–1978 Richard Gilliat
- 1966–1970 Roy Marshall
- 1958–1965 Colin Ingleby-Mackenzie
- 1946–1957 Desmond Eagar
- 1939–1945 WWII – No county cricket
- 1939 George Taylor
- 1938 Cecil Paris
- 1936–1937 Dick Moore
- 1934–1935 Geoffrey Lowndes
- 1919–1933 Lionel Tennyson
- 1914–1918 WWI – No County cricket
- 1903–1914 Edward Sprot
- 1900–1902 Charles Robson
- 1896–1899 Teddy Wynyard
- 1895 Russell Bencraft
- 1886–1894 No first-class matches played by Hampshire
- 1883–1885 Arthur Wood
- 1880–1882 Russell Bencraft
- 1879 Arthur Wood
- 1875–1878 Clement Booth
- 1870–1874 No first-class matches played by Hampshire
- 1864–1869 George Ede

== Staff ==
First team staff

Position	Name
Director of cricket	Giles White
First team coach	TBA
Batting coach	TBA
Bowling coach	Shane Burger
Fielding consultant	Richard Halsall
Second XI coach	Joe Maiden
Head of Academy	Charlie Freeston
Player development manager	James Tomlinson
Player & coach mentor	Tony Middleton
Head physiotherapist	Mal Godtschailk
Head of sports science & medicine	Jamie Cook
Strength & conditioning coach	Ty Chegwidden
Performance analyst	Matt Funnell
Team liaison officer	Chris Wheeler

== Records ==
For more details on this topic, see List of Hampshire County Cricket Club first-class cricket records, List of Hampshire County Cricket Club List A cricket records, List of Hampshire County Cricket Club Twenty20 cricket records.

== Results summary ==
For more details on this topic, see Hampshire County Cricket Club record by opponent.

== Grounds ==
=== The Rose Bowl ===
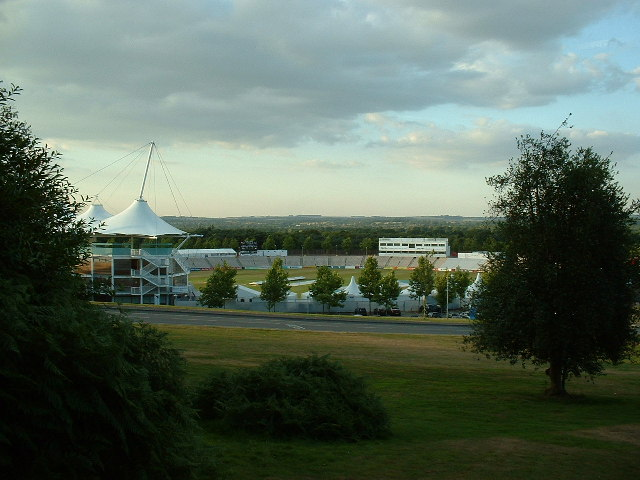
The Rose Bowl, seen before redevelopment started in 2009

Hampshire play the majority of their home matches at The Rose Bowl. One reason for building the new Rose Bowl ground was to attract international cricket to the south coast of England. The old County Ground, Hampshire's home since 1885, no longer had the capability to do this. Land in West End, on the outskirts of Southampton was chosen as the location for The Rose Bowl. Construction began in March 1997 and was completed in time for the 2001 season. Hampshire's first first-class match on the ground was against Worcestershire, ending in a victory by 124 runs for Hampshire. In July 2008 the ground hosted the Twenty20 Cup final, with Middlesex defeating Kent by 3 runs in the final. In August 2010, the ground hosted the Friends Provident t20 finals day, in which history was created when Hampshire became the first team to win the tournament at their home ground as they defeated Somerset in dramatic scenes off the last ball of the match. In 2011, England played their first Test match at the Rose Bowl during their series with Sri Lanka.

The ends are called the Pavilion End and the Hilton End or for ICC competitions the Hotel End.

== See also ==
- Lists of Hampshire County Cricket Club players
