= Sport on the Isle of Wight =

Sport plays a prominent role in the society of the Isle of Wight, an island that is part of England.

== Cycling ==
The island is well known for its cycling, and it was included within Lonely Planet's Best in Travel Guide (2010) top ten cycling locations. The island also hosts events such as the Isle of Wight Randonnée and the Isle of Wight Cycling Festival each year. A popular cycling track is the Sunshine Trail which starts in Newport and ends in Sandown.

== Rowing ==
There are rowing clubs at Newport, Ryde and Shanklin Sandown RC, all members of the Hants and Dorset rowing association.

There is a long tradition of rowing around the island dating back to the 1880s.

In May 1999 a group of local women made history by becoming the first ladies' crew to row around the island, in ten hours and twenty minutes. Rowers from Ryde Rowing Club have rowed around the island several times since 1880. The fours record was set 16 August 1995 at 7 hours 54 minutes.

Two rowers from Southampton ARC (Chris Bennett and Roger Slaymaker) set the two-man record in July 2003 at 8 hours 34 minutes, and in 2005 Gus McKechnie of Coalporters Rowing Club became the first adaptive rower to row around, completing a clockwise row.

The route around the island is about 60 miles (97 km) and usually rowed anticlockwise. Even in good conditions, it includes a number of significant obstacles such as the Needles and the overfalls at St Catherine's Point. The traditional start and finish were at Ryde Rowing Club; however, other starts have been chosen in recent years to give a tidal advantage.

== Sailing ==
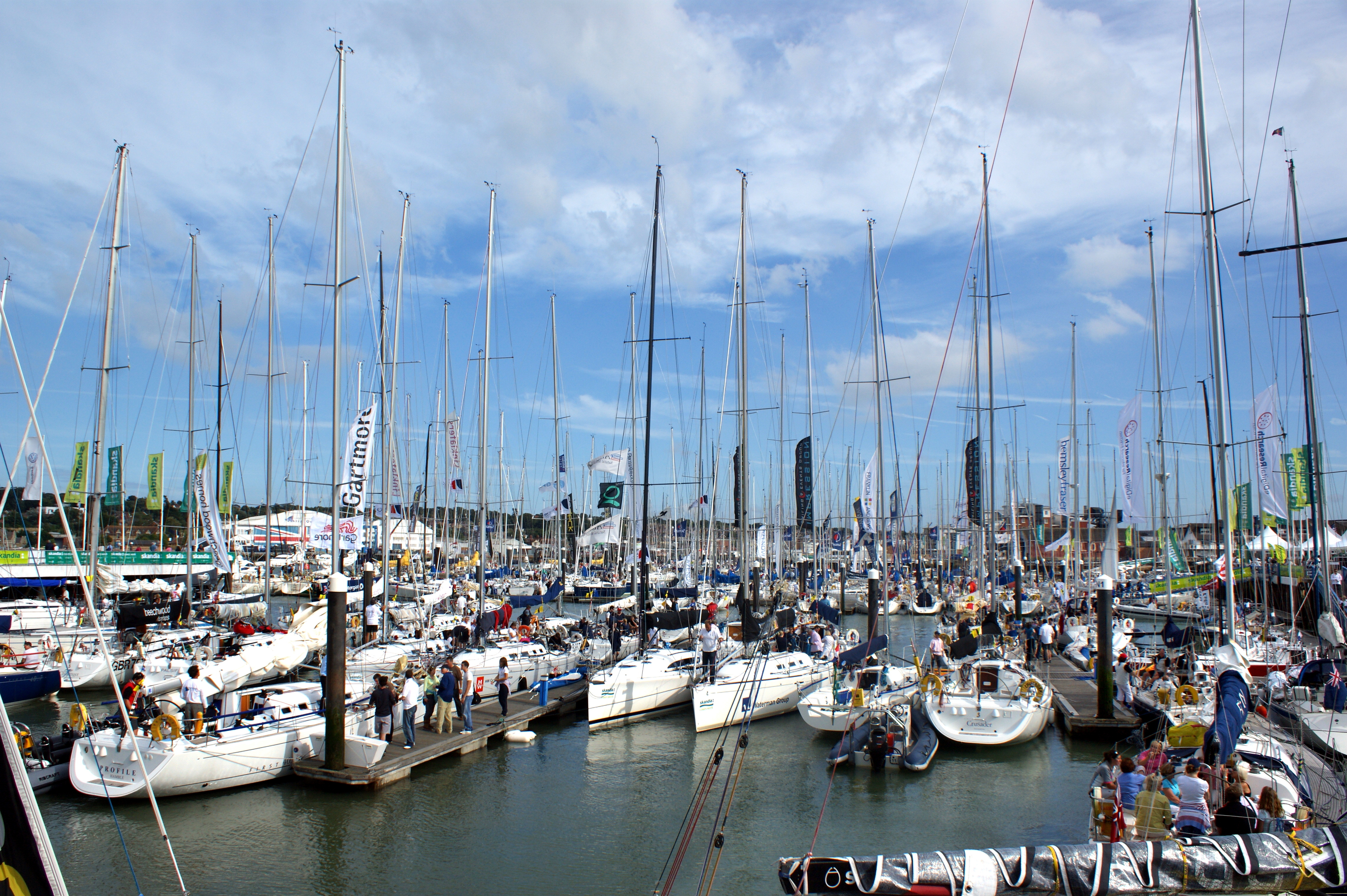
Boats in the marina during Cowes Week

Cowes is a centre for sailing, hosting several racing regattas. Cowes Week is the longest-running regular regatta in the world, with over 1,000 yachts and 8,500 competitors taking part in over 50 classes of racing. In 1851 the first America's Cup race was around the island. Other major sailing events hosted in Cowes include the Fastnet race, the Round the Island Race, the Admiral's Cup, and the Commodore's Cup.

== Trampolining ==
There are two main trampoline clubs on the island, in Freshwater and Newport, competing at regional, national and international grades.

== Marathon ==
The Isle of Wight Marathon is the United Kingdom's oldest continuously held marathon, having been run every year since 1957. Since 2013 the course has started and finished in Cowes, heading out to the west of the island and passing through Gurnard, Rew Street, Porchfield, Shalfleet, Yarmouth, Afton, Willmingham, Thorley, Wellow, Shalfleet, Porchfield, and Northwood. It is an undulating course with a total climb of 1,043 feet (318 m).

== Speedway ==
The island is home to the Isle of Wight Warriors, a motorcycle speedway team, who have competed in the British speedway leagues at Smallbrook Stadium.

== Field hockey ==
Following an amalgamation of local hockey clubs in 2010, the Isle of Wight Hockey Club now runs two men's senior and three ladies' senior teams, as well as U14 and U16 junior teams. These compete at a range of levels in the Hampshire leagues.

== Football ==
The now-disbanded Ryde Sports F.C., founded in 1888, was one of the eight founder members of the Hampshire League in 1896. There are several non-league clubs such as Newport (IOW) F.C. There is an Isle of Wight Saturday Football League which feeds into the Hampshire League with two divisions and two reserve team leagues, and a rugby union club.

== Cricket ==
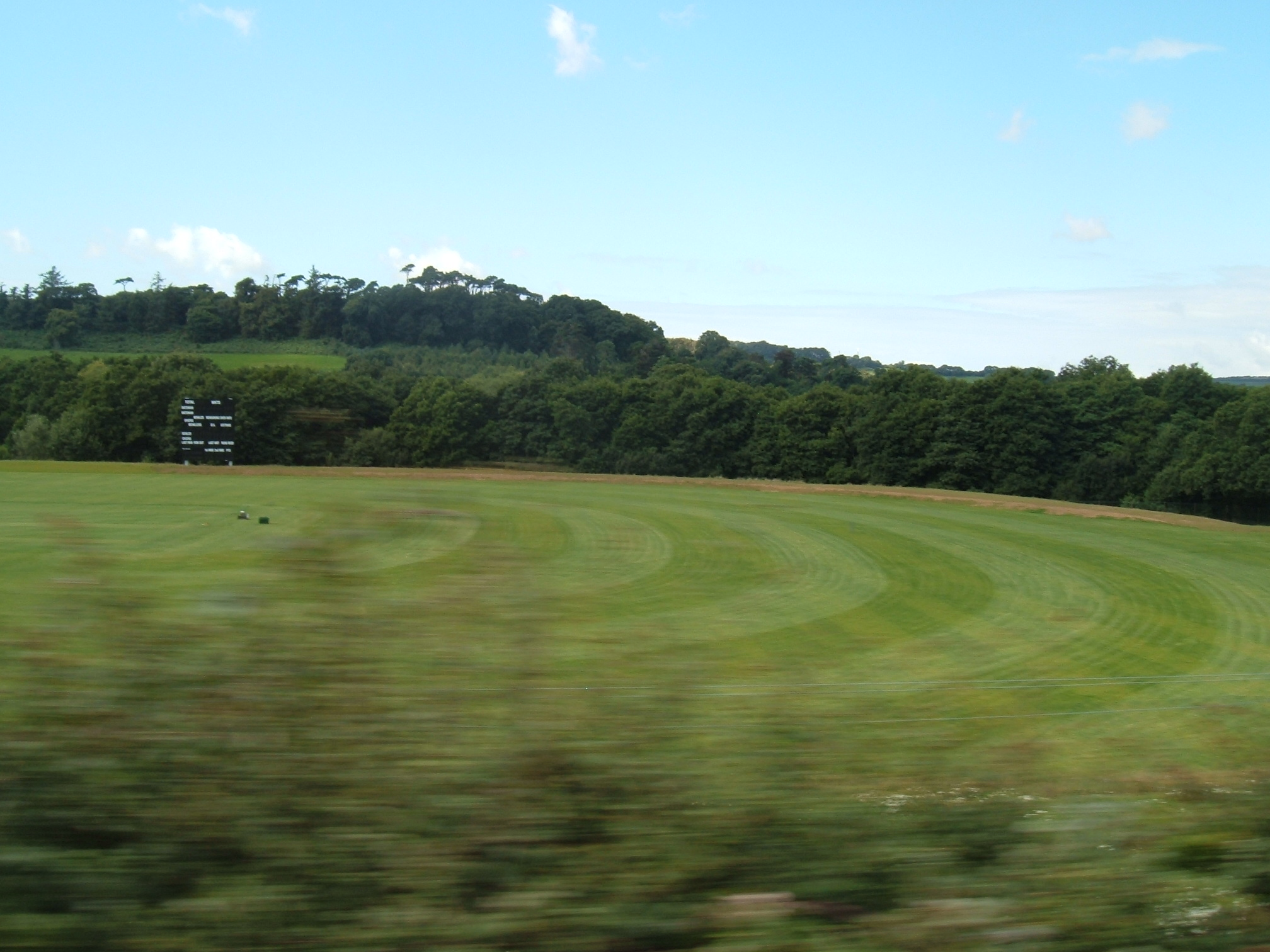
Newclose County Cricket Ground

The Isle of Wight is the 39th official county in English cricket, and the Isle of Wight Cricket Board organises a league of local clubs. Ventnor Cricket Club competes in the Southern Premier League, and has won the Second Division several times. Newclose County Cricket Ground near Newport opened officially in 2009 but with its first match held on 6 September 2008. The island has produced some notable cricketers, such as Danny Briggs, who plays county cricket for Warwickshire.

Hampshire County Cricket Club have played County Championship matches on the Isle of Wight in three separate spells. The club played two matches at the Victoria Recreation Ground in Newport in 1938 and 1939 and returned to the island to play seven matches at the J. Samuel White's Ground in Cowes, one each season from 1956 to 1962. Hampshire played another County Championship game on the Isle of Wight in 2019, at the Newclose Ground. A scheduled 2020 Royal London One-Day Cup match was shelved when the tournament was cancelled due to the COVID-19 pandemic in the United Kingdom.

== Island Games ==
The Isle of Wight competes in the biennial Island Games, which it hosted in 1993 and again in 2011.

== Golf ==
There are eight Golf courses on the Isle of Wight.

== Rock Climbing ==
There is one traditional rock climb on the Isle of Wight along the Skeleton Ridge; the chalk formation just to the East of The Needles. The route named Skeleton Ridge is graded HVS 4c and has 6 pitches; it was first ascended by Mick Fowler and Lorraine Smythe on the 3^{rd} November 1984.

== Rugby Union ==
There are three clubs on the island: Sandown & Shanklin, Isle of Wight and Ventnor, each running more than one side and competing in the RFU Leagues, typically playing against sides from Hampshire and West Sussex.

== Motor scooter ==
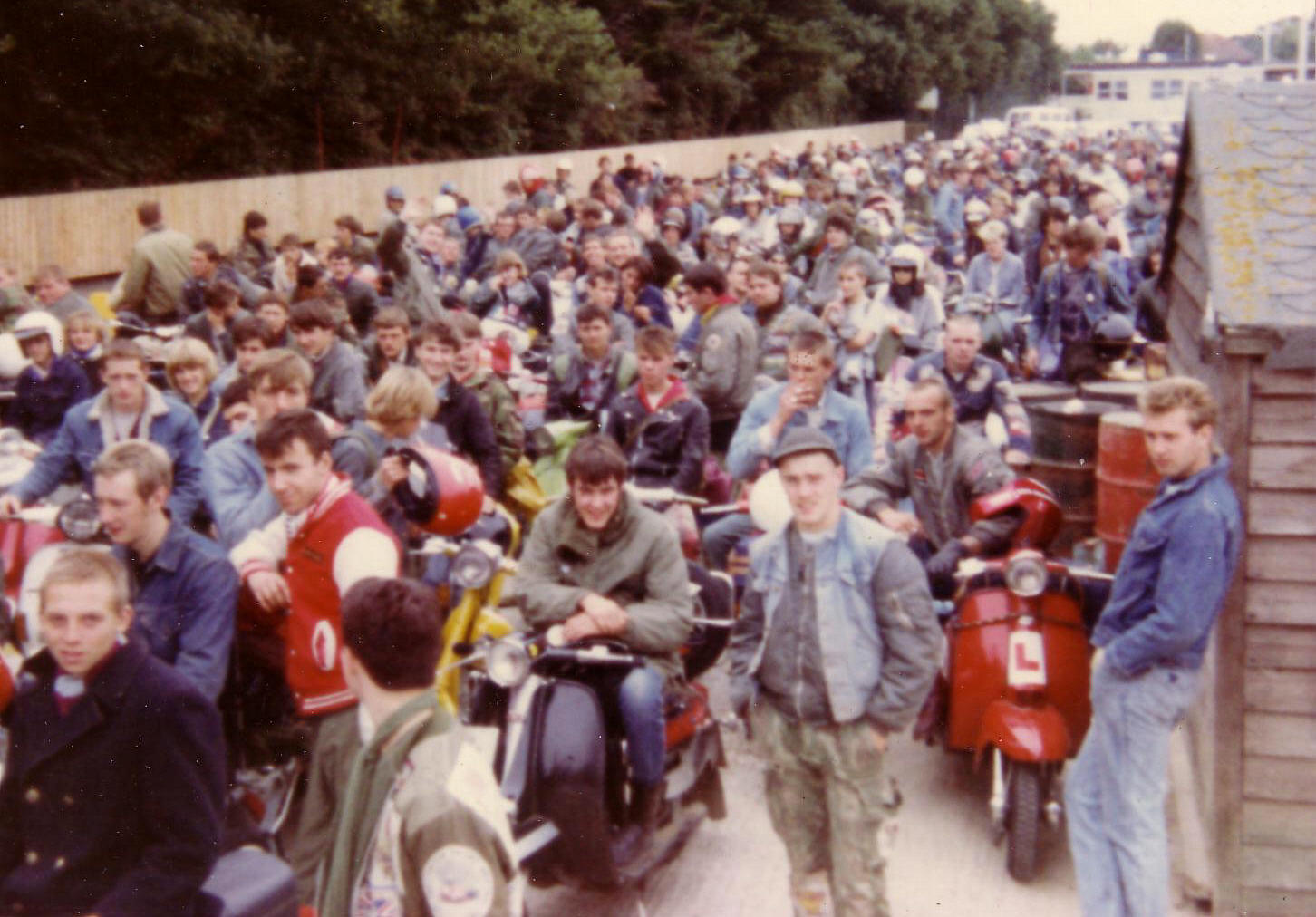
Scooterists waiting for the ferry after the Isle of Wight scooter rally in August 1983

The annual Isle of Wight International Scooter Rally has since 1980 met on the August Bank Holiday. This is now one of the biggest scooter rallies in the world, attracting between four and seven thousand participants.
