= Leslie Watson (runner) =

Scottish long-distance runner (1945–2024)

Personal information
- Nationality: British (Scottish)
- Born: 4 February 1945 Glasgow, Scotland
- Died: 1 January 2024 (aged 78)
- Occupations: powerlifter, physiotherapist

Sport
- Sport: Athletics
- Event: Long-distance running

Leslie Mary Broadfoot Watson (4 February 1945 – 1 January 2024) was a British long-distance runner, physiotherapist, and powerlifter. She helped establish women's presence in long-distance running in the UK, being the first Scotswoman to officially run a marathon, winning over 60 marathons, and helping to popularise women's participation in marathon running.

== Early life ==
Watson was born in Glasgow, Scotland, and was the only child to her father, a doctor for the British Army, and her mother, a dancer specializing in Russian Cossack dancing. Her birth registration may incorrectly state her first name as "Lesley" due to a mistaken spelling by her father. When she was 5, Watson began organizing races with her friends after school but recalled that she was always beaten until she began lengthening the race distances, where she could outlast her friends. She also began competing in swim events as a child.

Watson began official training for running at ten years old with the Maryhill Harriers Ladies, a running club in Glasgow. The club was separate from the all-male Maryhill Harriers, although they shared the same colors and crest, and practiced at the same facilities. Watson joined the Ladies with a friend, and later described herself as one of the "scrubbers": runners with little natural athletic talent who succeed by hard training. At this time, the Ladies were the only running club for women in the West End of Glasgow, so some runners carpooled with their school PE teacher, John Anderson, to attend club practices. In 1961, the head coaches of the Ladies left to form a new club, and Anderson took over operation of the Ladies; club members also decided to rename themselves to the Maryhill Ladies Athletic Club to remove the association with the male Harriers. Watson thanked Anderson's coaching from 1960 to 1968, and late in the 1970s, for her athletic success.

== Career ==
=== Track and cross-country national championships ===
During this period she began to compete in track and cross-country races. She first won the Scottish Schools 880 yards title in 1963. She placed ninth in the English Cross-Country Championships in 1964 and later described it as her most pleasing performance "because it was the first time [she'd] ever beaten anyone of any consequence." Watson then won the Scottish one mile crown in 1966, beating fellow Maryhill Ladies AC runners Dale Greig and Catherine Kelly with her 5:14:4 mile time. She achieved success at the Scottish National Championships, placing fifth in 1962 (a race won by Dale Greig), and winning first place in 1966 and 1967, beating Greig in both races.

In the 1960s Watson studied at Glasgow University to qualify as a physiotherapist, and moved to London in 1970 to work at the National Health Service. After six months, she left the NHS to set up her own private practice. In London, she joined London Olympiades AC, the oldest women's athletic club in Britain. Diane Leather and Sue Platt were two Olympiades members who had recently been to the Summer Olympics at this time, and the club sent winning teams to the English National Championships Senior Women division in 1959, 1961, and 1962. During this period, women in the U.K. were not allowed to compete at distances more than 6000 metres or compete against men, while men had no distance limits during competition. Watson competed in cross-country, track, and road relays until 1975, when the U.K.'s governing body for women's racing, the Women's Amateur Athletic Association, began to experimentally allow women over 21 years old to compete in marathons.

=== Marathon career ===
The first women's marathon in the U.K. happened 19 October 1975 when the Masters and Maidens race was held: even then, it was unofficial and did not receive a permit from the Amateur Athletic Association or the WAAA. Watson had been training at only 20 miles of running a week, but did a slow 20-mile run to prep the day before the race. Watson later recalled: "I went out the night before the race and had lots of bad red wine and then on the way down I was eating chocolate and popcorn. I felt sick by the time we started and I was exhausted after 3 miles." Watson finished in 3 hours, 31 minutes, and was the third-place women's finisher, one of twelve women to finish the race. She competed in the Barnsley Marathon the next month, and in 1976 repeated both marathons and won. Watson then became known for her success in marathons, competing in 206 races and winning more than 60, until her final marathon at Isle of Wight in 1994. She was the top-ranked female Scottish marathon runner in 1976–1978, and 1980. In 1978, she ran her first sub-three hour marathon and finished third behind Margaret Lockley in the inaugural WAAA marathon event at the 1978 WAAA Championships.

Before some long-standing marathons allowed women to compete, some female runners would sneak in to run them anyway. Dale Greig and Bridget Cushen had previously been the first women to compete in certain marathons this way. In 1979, Watson entered an established ultramarathon in the same way, following Greig's example three years prior. Watson and four other women (Ruth Anderson, Lydia Kirk, Lyn Billington, and unknown) entered the 54-mile London to Brighton ultramarathon, which had an 8-hour, 23 minute time limit. Leslie, Lydia, and Ruth finished in the time limit, with Leslie finishing first of the trio and faster than most of the men, at a 6:55:11 time. The next year, the race hosts supported an official women's London to Brighton ultramarathon, and Watson returned to claim first again.

By 1981, Watson's training regimen was to run over 20 miles on Sunday, up to 15 miles on Thursday, with shorter runs and rest days throughout the week. She ran over 20 marathons that year, with 7 overseas, and was ranked in the top ten for UK women's marathoners. At the Lake Waramaug 50 mile road race on 3 May 1981, in Connecticut, USA, Watson placed first for women and tenth overall with a 6:02:37 time, and this broke the previous women's 50-mile world record by two minutes. She also set the women's world record for the 100-km distance in Grantham. Watson's best marathon overall was at the 1982 New York City Marathon, where she ran a 2:44:18 time. In 1989, she won the Adelaide Marathon in 2:49:49, and her final 1994 race resulted in her seventh win of the Isle of Wight marathon.

=== Media and advertising ===
Starting in the 1980s, Watson's racing success led to many media appearances, commentaries, and advertising promotions. She wrote frequently about the London Marathon in running publications. After Watson's friend Lawrence Brampton started the London Runner chain of running stores in 1981, Watson frequently starred in print ads and hosted clinics. She also faced sexist expectations and gender roles in the running world and in these appearances. Magazine interviews focused on objectification and how her looks impacted male runners, and she was nicknamed the "glamour girl of marathons". Even feature articles and interviews by other runners emphasized explicit objectification of Watson alongside her successes. In addition to the comments of outsiders, Watson repeatedly mentioned her personal expectations about weight loss and diet during interviews over her career. According to Watson's obituary in The Times,

At the time hotpants were fashionable and later Watson told The Observer: “I wore them but really I was a little too fat, so one day when I saw an advertisement for the Masters and Maidens marathon it crossed my mind that marathon running might be slimming.”

=== Powerlifting career ===
After her last marathon in 1994, Watson had to stop running due to a twisted nerve in her knee. She continued work as a physiotherapist and began competitive powerlifting. By 1997 she competed in the 48-kilo bracket of the British championships for powerlifting. Over the same period, Watson began dating Bernard "Budgie" Mullan, a powerlifter who she had helped with extensive physical therapy after his 1993 motorcycle accident. Mullan taught her powerlifting technique, and they later trained together for competitions. Watson and Mullan set British, European and World records for powerlifting in their age divisions.

== Death ==
Watson was hospitalized on 23 December 2023. She died 1 January 2024, aged 78, after developing complications from blood clots. By the time of her death, she had been partners with Budgie Mullan for 30 years, and was survived by his grandchildren. As of 2024, the Maryhill Harriers give annual trophies in her name, awarding the Leslie Watson trophy to the Women's Merit League Champion each year.
