= Robert Manser =

English cricketer

Personal information
- Full name: Robert Marsack Manser
- Born: 10 October 1880; Tunbridge Wells, Kent, England
- Died: 15 February 1955 (aged 74); Parkstone, Dorset, England
- Batting: Right-handed

Domestic team information
- Years: Team
- 1904: Hampshire
- 1909–1929: Dorset

Career statistics
| Competition | First-class |
|---|---|
| Matches | 1 |
| Runs scored | 1 |
| Batting average | 0.50 |
| 100s/50s | –/– |
| Top score | 1 |
| Catches/stumpings | 1/– |
- Source: Cricinfo, 24 January 2010

Robert Marsack Manser (10 October 1880 – 15 February 1955) was an English first-class cricketer and solicitor.

The second son of Frederick Manser, he was born at Tunbridge Wells in October 1880. He was educated at Tonbridge School, where he played for the school cricket team, before matriculating to Lincoln College, Oxford. He made a single appearance in first-class cricket for Hampshire against the touring South Africans at Alton in 1904. Batting twice in the match, he was dismissed in Hampshire's first innings for a single run by Johannes Kotze, while on their second innings he was dismissed without scoring by Jimmy Sinclair. After graduating from Oxford, Manser trained to become a solicitor at Southampton under the tutorage of John Moberly, himself a former Hampshire cricketer. He later moved to Dorset, where he practiced as a solicitor at Bournemouth (then a part of Hampshire) and Poole. He later became joint registrar of Poole and Bournemouth County Courts and was clerk to the Poole Harbour Commissioners. While living in Dorset, Manser played minor counties cricket for Dorset, making 39 appearances for in the Minor Counties Championship between 1909 and 1929. Later, in July 1944, he was appointed joint registrar at Dorchester and Weymouth County Courts. Manser died at Parkstone in Poole in February 1955.
