= List of Hampshire County Cricket Club grounds =

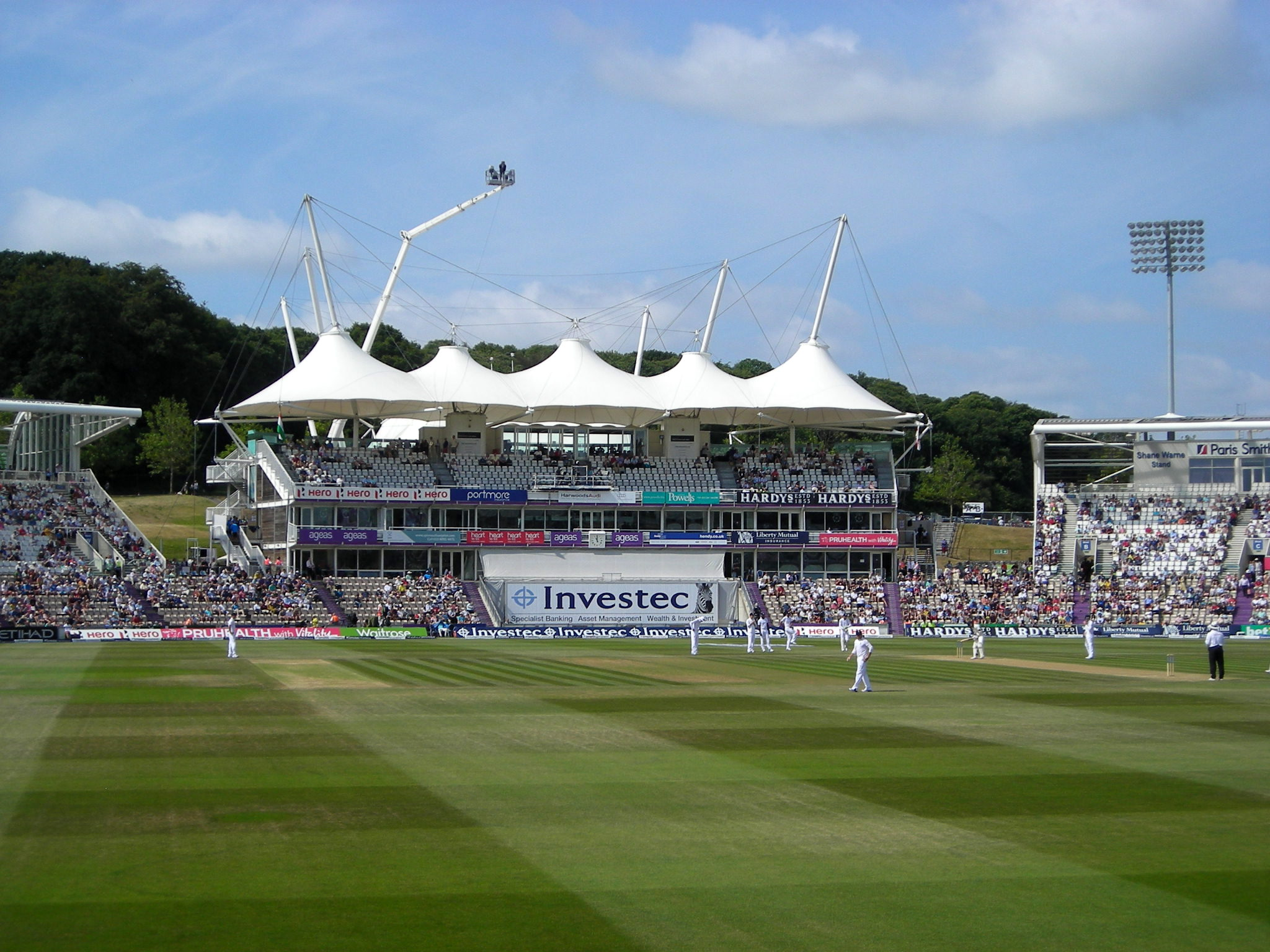
The Rose Bowl (pictured) has been Hampshire's main home ground since 2001.

Hampshire County Cricket Club was established in August 1863. Since then, Hampshire has played first-class, List A one-day, and Twenty20 matches at various venues across the historic extent of Hampshire. (Note: First-class cricket has been played in Hampshire since 1772. This list only covers the grounds used by Hampshire County Cricket Club since 1864, and not those used by ad hoc Hampshire representative sides prior to that date.) Unlike most professional sports, where a team usually has a single fixed home ground, county cricket clubs have traditionally used different home grounds in various towns and cities for home matches. However, minor "outgrounds" have diminished since the 1980s. Particularly in the early days of county cricket, where personal transportation was a rare commodity, it was an expectation that cricket would have to be taken to the large and diverse areas a county would geographically cover. The Antelope Ground hosted their inaugural home first-class match in 1864, while the County Ground hosted the most home matches in first-class and one-day cricket, when it was used as Hampshire's headquarters between 1885 and 2000. Hampshire's current headquarters, since 2001, have been at the Rose Bowl. As of 2026, Hampshire has played home fixtures at 14 venues.

== History ==
=== Headquarters ===
Locations of grounds used by Hampshire.

Hampshire's inaugural home first-class match came against Sussex at the Antelope Ground in Southampton in 1864, a ground used by various ad hoc Hampshire representative sides since 1842. The Antelope Ground was Hampshire's first headquarters. Hampshire left the Antelope Ground in 1885, moving to their new headquarters at the County Ground in Southampton, after a lease was successfully acquired by the cricketer James Fellowes, which began an association at the County Ground which would last for 115 years. During Hampshire's tenure of the County Ground, they played 565 first-class and 209 one-day matches there. Necessitated by a need to move from the cramped conditions of the County Ground and develop a headquarters which could attract international cricket, Hampshire moved to the purpose-built Rose Bowl in the Southampton suburb of West End ahead of the 2001 season, which remains their main home venue. In addition to hosting Hampshire matches, the Rose Bowl has played host to Test, One Day International, and Twenty20 International matches for England.

=== Outgrounds ===
Hampshire has used several "outgrounds" as venues for home matches. In 1875, Hampshire played two matches in Winchester at the Green Jackets Ground and Winchester College. In 1888, Hampshire began playing first-class matches in Portsmouth at the United Services Recreation Ground, used by the officers and ranks of services teams based in the city. Hampshire would use the United Services Recreation Ground as an outground for over a century, playing 316 first-class and 54 one-day matches there, before matches hosted in Portsmouth were moved to the Rose Bowl upon its completion. In 1897, Hampshire began playing at Dean Park Cricket Ground in Bournemouth. With the early matches played there proving to be financially successful, the ground was afforded two Hampshire home matches per season starting in 1899, which formed part of the matches played there during the Bournemouth Cricket Week. Following changes to county borders in 1972 that transferred Bournemouth from Hampshire to Dorset, Hampshire's use of the ground diminished and it last played host to a Hampshire home fixture in 1992. During Hampshire's use of Dean Park, they played 336 first-class and 68 one-day matches.

Shortly after the turn of the twentieth century, Hampshire played one first-class match in Alton at the Municipal Ground against the touring South Africans in 1904. The following year, they played at the Officers Club Services Ground in Aldershot for the first time, which is also the home ground of the British Army cricket team; they would play five first-class matches there up to 1948. In 1906, Hampshire played at May's Bounty in Basingstoke for the first time. They played intermittently at May's Bounty until 2010, playing 46 first-class and 30 one-day matches there. Hampshire played on the Isle of Wight, which had become its administrative county separate from Hampshire in 1890, for the first time in 1938 at the Victoria Recreation Ground in Newport, but played there for only two seasons before the Second World War. They returned to the island in 1956, playing annually at the newly constructed J Samuel White's Ground in Cowes until 1962. Half a century would pass before Hampshire would play matches at a new outground. This would come in 2013, when the Nursery Ground, located adjacent to the Rose Bowl, hosted a first-class MCC Universities Match against Loughborough MCCU. In 2019, with the Rose Bowl hosting matches in the World Cup, Hampshire returned to the Isle of Wight to play at the Newclose County Cricket Ground near Newport; since 2019, one first-class and two one-day matches have been played there.

== Grounds ==
As of 2026, Hampshire has played 1,501 first-class matches at fourteen home grounds, and 513 List A matches at six home grounds. They have also played 132 Twenty20 matches, all of which have been played at the Rose Bowl. The twelve grounds that Hampshire have used for home matches are listed below, with statistics complete through to the end of the 2024 season. Note: Only matches involving Hampshire as the home team are recorded, while matches abandoned without a toss or a ball being bowled are excluded from the count.

Grounds
Name	Location	First-class			List A			Twenty20		
Name	Location	First	Last	Matches	First	Last	Matches	First	Last	Matches
Antelope Ground	Southampton	7 July 1864 v Sussex	7 August 1884 v Somerset	27	–	–	0	–	–	0
Green Jackets Ground	Winchester	only match: 1 July 1875 v Sussex	–	1	–	–	0	–	–	0
Winchester College Ground	Winchester	only match: 19 August 1875 v Kent	–	1	–	–	0	–	–	0
United Services Recreation Ground	Portsmouth	28 August 1882 v Sussex	19 July 2000 v Kent	316	22 May 1965 v Kent	23 July 2000 v Middlesex	54	–	–	0
County Ground	Southampton	15 June 1885 v Marylebone Cricket Club	13 September 2000 v Yorkshire	565	1 May 1965 v Norfolk	17 September 2000 v Nottinghamshire	207	–	–	0
Dean Park	Bournemouth	1 July 1897 v Gentlemen of Philadelphia	18 August 1992 v Middlesex	336	22 May 1963 v Derbyshire	16 August 1992 v Northamptonshire	68 (Note: Hampshire also played a one-day match at Dean Park as the away team against Dorset in the 1998 NatWest Trophy.)	–	–	0
Municipal Ground	Alton	only match: 7 July 1904 v South Africans	–	1	–	–	0	–	–	0
Officers Club Services Ground	Aldershot	25 May 1905 v Surrey	16 June 1948 v Combined Services	5	–	–	0	–	–	0
May's Bounty	Basingstoke	21 May 1906 v Warwickshire	3 August 2010 v Durham	46	29 April 1967 v Lincolnshire	18 June 2000 v Durham	30	–	–	0
Victoria Recreation Ground	Newport	20 August 1938 v Northamptonshire	24 June 1939 v Middlesex	2	–	–	0	–	–	0
J. Samuel White's Ground	Cowes	26 May 1956 v Worcestershire	26 May 1962 v Worcestershire	7	–	–	0	–	–	0
Rose Bowl	West End	9 May 2001 v Worcestershire	still in use	195	4 May 2001 v Surrey	still in use	152	13 June 2003 v Sussex	still in use	132
Nursery Ground	West End	only match: 17 April 2013 v Loughborough MCCU	–	1	–	–	0	–	–	0
Newclose County Cricket Ground	Newport	only match: 20 May 2019 v Nottinghamshire	–	1	9 August 2022 v Northamptonshire	22 August 2023 v Kent	2	–	–	0
