= Winchester College Ground =

Cricket ground in Winchester, Hampshire

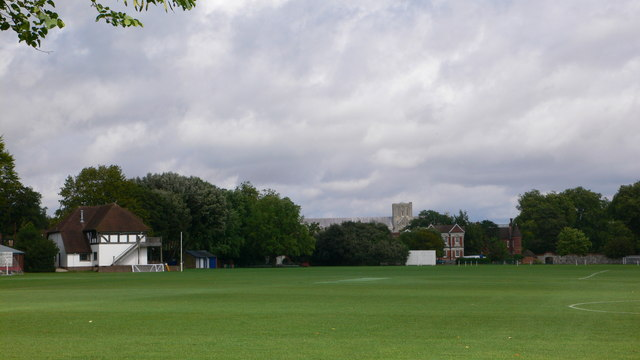

Ground information
- Location: Winchester, Hampshire
- Coordinates: 51.0546°N 1.3165°W
- Establishment: 1869

Team information
Hampshire	(1875)
- As of 28 December 2011; Source: Ground profile

Winchester College Ground is a cricket ground in Winchester, Hampshire. It is located in the historic grounds of Winchester College, with evidence suggesting cricket in Winchester dates back to the 17th century. The present ground, which is also known as New Field or Ridding Field, dates from 1869 when the then headmaster George Ridding bought land south of "meads", the original venue for college cricket, and donated it to the college. The ground held its only first-class cricket match in 1875, when Hampshire played Kent. Hampshire, who were captained by Clement Booth, were dismissed for just 34 in their first-innings. In response, Kent were dismissed for 333, giving them a lead of 299. Hampshire fared little better in their second-innings, making just 82 to lose the match by an innings and 217 runs.

Until 1888 the pitch lay east–west, after which it was moved to lay north–south, a position retained to this day. The original pavilion at the ground was constructed in memory of Herbert Webbe; it was destroyed in 1935, with a replacement constructed. The ground is still used by the college for matches against Eton College and Harrow School, and by the Old Wykehamist Cricket Club.

== See also ==
- List of Hampshire County Cricket Club grounds
