= J. Samuel White's Ground =

Sports ground in Cowes, Isle of Wight

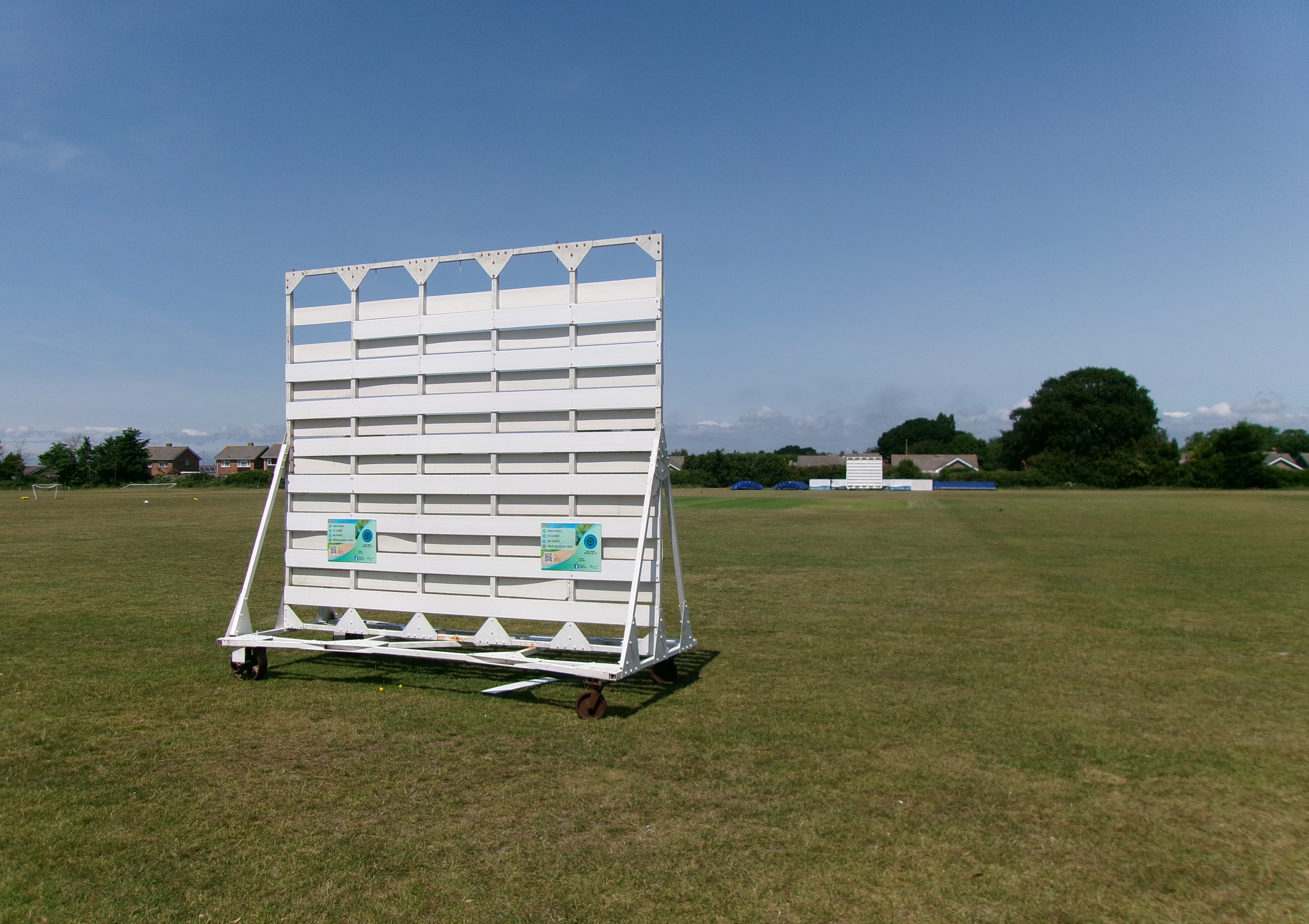
- Cricket pitch at J. Samuel White's Ground
- Interactive map of J. Samuel White's Ground

Ground information
- Location: Cowes, Isle of Wight
- Country: England
- Coordinates: 50.7572°N 1.3121°W
- Establishment: 1953
- Owner: Isle of Wight Council

Team information
Hampshire	(1956–1962)
- As of 30 December 2011; Source: Ground profile

J. Samuel White's Ground (also known as Plessey Ground) is a sports ground in Park Road, Cowes, Isle of Wight, England. The ground is owned by the Isle of Wight Council and is surrounded by residential housing. A multitude of sports have been played at the ground, including cricket, football and bowls.

== History ==
The ground was originally owned by J. Samuel White & Co. Ltd., a ship builders based in Cowes. The company constructed the ground in 1953, with construction being funded by subscriptions from employees of the company. Hampshire first played first-class cricket there three years later in 1956, when Worcestershire were the visitors in the County Championship, with Colin Ingleby-Mackenzie scoring the maiden century on the ground in Hampshire's first-innings, followed by Laddy Outschoorn in Worcestershire's second-innings. The match ended in a draw. Hampshire played a match there each year until 1962, playing seven first-class matches there. However, J.Samuel White & Co. Ltd. fell on hard times, with the company's Cowes shipyard closing in 1963, bringing to an end Hampshire's use of the ground. The ground was sought after for development, but planning was refused, with the ground falling into disuse.

The ground was later bought in 1978 by the Isle of Wight County Council. The council sought to offload the ground to a community-based organisation in 1984, with a lease being agreed with the Plessey Club. The Milne Memorial Sports Ground Co. Ltd (named after Sir James Milne, C.B.E. 1896–1966, managing director 1941–1962, J. Samuel White) was formed in 1985 to acquire the lease and manage the day-to-day running of the club. When first acquired, the clubs membership was only open to employees and ex-employees of Plessey's and J. Samuel White & Co. Having been disused by until 1984, the cricket ground and football grounds had been used for hay making, the tennis courts and bowling greens were in a state of disrepair, as was the pavilion. The club borrowed £65,000 to extend the pavilion and £10,000 to building a new clubhouse for the bowling greens. Hampshire returned there for a match in 1987 in aid of Malcolm Marshall's benefit, though the game didn't carry first-class or List A status. Today, the cricket ground is used by Cowes Cricket Club. More recently, the club was able to acquire National Lottery funding to the tune of £330,000 for an indoor bowls facility, though this was only possible by club members lending £100,000 themselves. The club is today open to membership for all residents of the Isle of Wight.

== Records ==
=== First-class ===
- Highest team total: 398 by Glamorgan v Hampshire, 1960
- Lowest team total: 84 by Leicestershire v Hampshire, 1958
- Highest individual innings: 154* by Laddy Outschoorn for Worcestershire v Hampshire, 1956
- Best bowling in an innings: 7-81 by Derek Shackleton for Hampshire v Nottinghamshire, 1957
- Best bowling in a match: 13-135 by Derek Shackleton, as above

== See also ==
- List of Hampshire County Cricket Club grounds
- List of cricket grounds in England and Wales
