= May's Bounty =

Cricket ground in Basingstoke, England

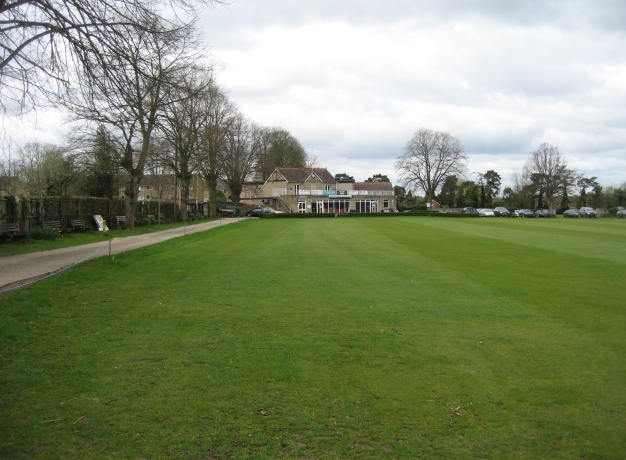
- Interactive map of May's Bounty

Ground information
- Location: Basingstoke, Hampshire
- Country: England
- Coordinates: 51.2595°N 1.0899°W
- Establishment: 1865
- Capacity: 2,500
- End names
- Town End; Castlefield End

Team information
Hampshire	(1906–2010)
- As of 31 December 2011; Source: Ground profile

May's Bounty is a cricket ground situated along Bounty Road in Basingstoke, Hampshire, England. The ground is compact and is lined on all sides by trees, with its northern side overlooked by residential housing. The Bounty was used intermittently by Hampshire County Cricket Club in the early 20th-century, before Hampshire began to play there annually from 1966 to 2000.

The ground is owned by the Basingstoke Sports and Social Club and is used in club cricket by Basingstoke and North Hants Cricket Club. The ground has a capacity for major matches of 2,500, while its end names are called the Town End to the north and the Castlefield End to the south.

== History ==
Cricket has been played in Basingstoke since at least 1817, likely at Basingstoke Common, with cricket first being played at May's Bounty, then known as The Folly, in 1855. The current Basingstoke and North Hants Cricket Club was founded in 1865, with the club playing at May's Bounty since its formation. The first match which was recorded at the ground saw Basingstoke play a United South of England Eleven. The ground was originally known as The Folly, but was renamed in honour of Lt Col John May, a member of a Basingstoke family of brewers, who bought The Folly from Thomas Burberry in 1880 to preserve it for sporting use, with the ground being donated to the cricket club playing there as a gift or "Bounty". It was around this time that a thatched roof pavilion was constructed in 1877. This was replaced by the current pavilion in 1901.

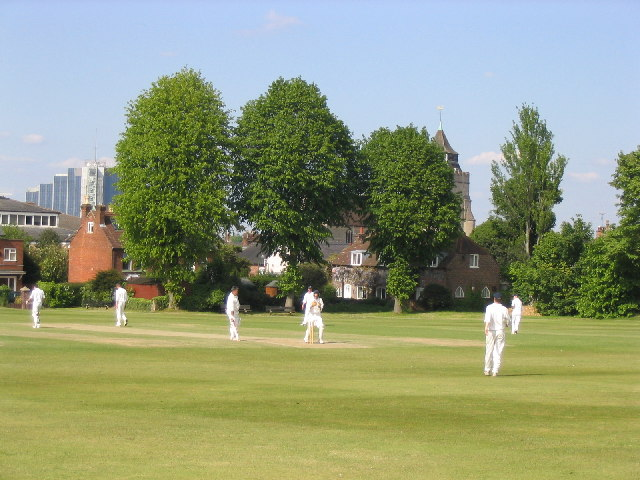
A match in progress at May's Bounty in 2005. The steeple in the background belongs to "All Saints Church" and the high rise office block in the distance is situated in Basingstoke town centre.

Hampshire first played first-class cricket there in 1906 against Warwickshire in the County Championship, which Warwickshire won by 107 runs. The maiden first-class century there was also scored in this match by Warwickshire's Sep Kinneir. Hampshire played there just once more before World War I, playing Derbyshire in 1914, which saw Hampshire's Arthur Jaques taking what remains the best match figures at the ground with figures of 14/105. Hampshire would not return to the ground until 1935, when Hampshire played Surrey in the County Championship. It was during this match that Andy Sandham scored his hundredth hundred. The following season Hampshire played two first-class matches there, against Nottinghamshire and Cambridge University. In the match against Nottinghamshire, Hampshire made their lowest first-class total at the ground when they were dismissed for just 61. Hampshire played a final first-class match there before World War II against Worcestershire. Prior to the war, Hampshire had lost six of their seven matches at May's Bounty, including three by an innings.

The ground was bought for the sum of £450 by the Basingstoke and North Hants Cricket Club in 1950. First-class cricket did not return to the ground immediately after the war, with Hampshire next playing there in 1951 against Oxford University. It was not until 1966 that the ground started to become an annual feature on Hampshire's fixture list. The following season the ground held its first List A match when Hampshire played Lincolnshire in the 1967 Gillette Cup. The 1970s saw records made at the ground which still stand, including the best innings figures in first-class matches, made by Glamorgan's Malcolm Nash, whose spell of swing bowling in 1975 returned figures of 9/56. Other records made in that decade saw both the highest and lowest List A team totals, 251 and 43 respectively. The highest score in List A cricket at the ground was made in 1974 by Barry Richards against Glamorgan. Over the coming three decades the ground held one first-class and one List A match each season, an arrangement which lasted until the 2000 season, after which Hampshire centralised all their matches to their new Rose Bowl home. During this sustained period of use by Hampshire, the county played 35 first-class matches and 30 List A matches there.

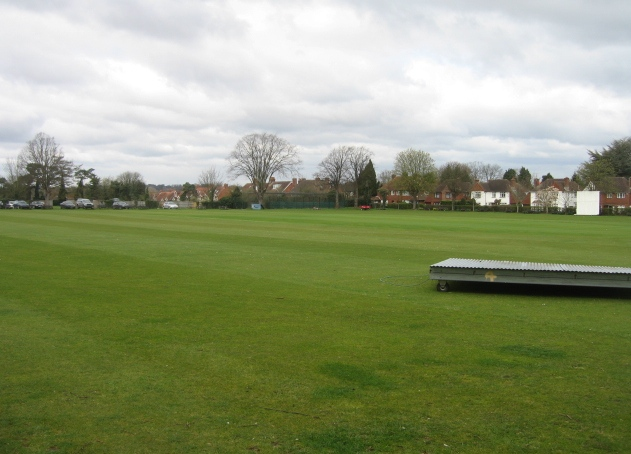
A view of the ground looking north toward the Town End.

Hampshire's Robin Smith holds the record for the most first-class runs at May's Bounty, having scored 977 runs at an average of 69.78, with six centuries. This despite Smith missing many matches due to Hampshire's Basingstoke fixture clashing with Smith's England Test duties at Lord's. Glamorgan's Alan Jones holds the highest individual first-class score at the ground, making an unbeaten 204 in 1980; this is the only double century to be made at the ground. Mark Nicholas and Gordon Greenidge also had favourable records at the ground. Cardigan Connor took the most wickets at the ground, with 40 wickets at a bowling average of 27.77, with the pitches typically favouring seam bowling and often producing low scoring encounters, despite the small size of the boundaries.

In February 2004, a fire seriously damaged the interior of the pavilion. In January 2007, Hampshire announced their intention to return to May's Bounty in 2008. In 2008 they played a single first-class match against Durham, which was a repeat of the ground's final first-class fixture in 2000, with Hampshire defeating that season's eventual county champions by 2 wickets. Hampshire played a further two first-class matches there, in the 2009 County Championship against Yorkshire, and in the 2010 County Championship against Durham. However, the ground was not included on Hampshire's fixture list for 2011.

== Records ==
=== First-class ===
- Highest team total: 524 by Yorkshire v Hampshire, 2009
- Lowest team total: 61 by Hampshire v Nottinghamshire, 1936
- Highest individual innings: 204* by Alan Jones for Glamorgan v Hampshire, 1980
- Best bowling in an innings: 9-56 by Malcolm Nash for Glamorgan v Hampshire, 1975
- Best bowling in a match: 14-105 by Arthur Jaques for Hampshire v Derbyshire, 1914

=== List A ===
- Highest team total: 251 (39.4 overs) by Hampshire v Glamorgan, 1974
- Lowest team total: 43 (24.1 overs) by Hampshire v Essex, 1972
- Highest individual innings: 123 by Barry Richards for Hampshire v Glamorgan, 1974
- Best bowling in an innings: 6-53 by Mark Ealham for Kent v Hampshire, 1993

== See also ==
- List of Hampshire County Cricket Club grounds
- List of cricket grounds in England and Wales
