= Green Jackets Ground =

Cricket ground in Winchester, Hampshire, England

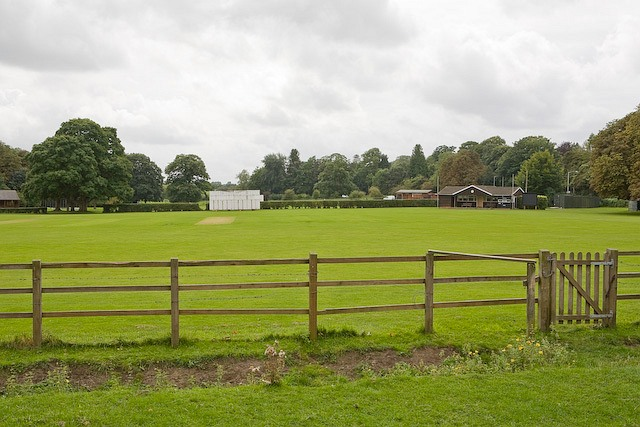
- Interactive map of Green Jackets Ground

Ground information
- Location: Winchester, Hampshire
- Country: England
- Coordinates: 51.0452°N 1.3234°W
- Establishment: c. 1859

Team information
Hampshire	(1875)
- As of 23 October 2009; Source: Ground profile

The Green Jackets Ground is a cricket ground in St Cross, Winchester, Hampshire.

The ground was first used in 1859, when Winchester Garrison played I Zingari. The ground was used by the Rifle Brigade, known as the Green Jackets, who were based in Winchester at the Peninsula Barracks. The ground is currently owned by the trustees of the nearby ancient Hospital of St Cross and lies next to water meadows of the River Itchen. The ground was first leased to the Rifle Brigade and since 1885 it has been leased to the Green Jackets Club. Only one first-class match was played at the ground, which saw Hampshire play Sussex in 1875. Sussex were dismissed in their first-innings for 206, with Hampshire being dismissed for just 60 in their first-innings and were made to follow-on in their second-innings, making a total of just 119. Sussex therefore winning by an innings and 27 runs. The original wooden cricket pavilion at the ground dated from 1886, but was destroyed by fire and a replacement was built in 1970. For many years, the ground has played host to the Southern Counties Archery Championship, in which thirteen counties from the South of England are represented. St Cross Symondians Cricket Club use the ground as their home venue.

== See also ==
- List of Hampshire County Cricket Club grounds
