= Rose Bowl (cricket ground) =

Cricket ground

- Utilita Bowl

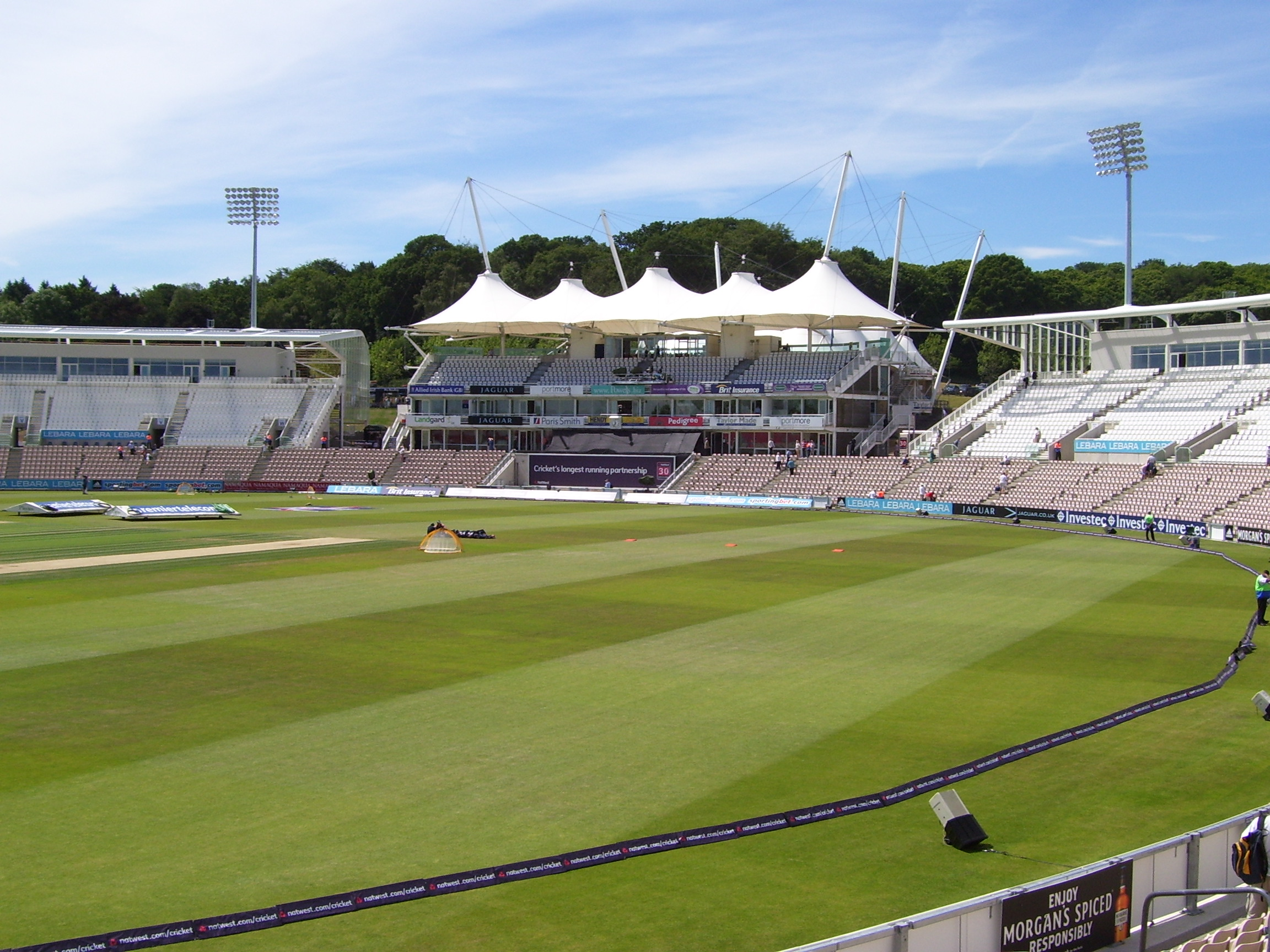
- The pavilion flanked by the Colin Ingleby-MacKenzie and Shane Warne Stands
- Interactive map of Rose Bowl

Ground information
- Location: West End, Hampshire, SO30 3XH
- Country: England
- Coordinates: 50.9240°N 1.3219°W
- Establishment: 2001
- Capacity: 15,000 (25,000 with temporary seating)
- Owner: RB Sport & Leisure Holdings plc
- End names
- Northern End Pavilion End

International information
- First men's Test: 16–20 June 2011: England v Sri Lanka
- Last men's Test: 19–23 June 2021: India v New Zealand
- First men's ODI: 10 July 2003: South Africa v Zimbabwe
- Last men's ODI: 7 September 2025: England v South Africa
- First men's T20I: 13 July 2005: England v Australia
- Last men's T20I: 15 September 2026: England v Sri Lanka
- First women's ODI: 24 August 2006: England v India
- Last women's ODI: 16 July 2025: England v India
- First women's T20I: 1 July 2010: England v New Zealand
- Last women's T20I: 20 June 2026: Bangladesh v Pakistan

Team information
Hampshire	(2001 – present)
Hampshire Cricket Board	(2001)
Southern Vipers	(2016 – 2024)
Southern Brave	(2021 -present)
- As of 6 July 2024; Source: ESPN Cricinfo

The Rose Bowl, known for sponsorship reasons as Utilita Bowl, is a cricket ground and hotel complex in West End, Hampshire. It is the home of Hampshire County Cricket Club, who have played there since 2001.

It was constructed as a replacement for the County Ground in Southampton and also the United Services Recreation Ground in Portsmouth, which had been Hampshire's homes since 1882. Hampshire played their inaugural first-class match at the ground against Worcestershire on 9–11 May 2001, with Hampshire winning by 124 runs. The ground has since hosted international cricket, including One Day Internationals, matches in the 2004 Champions Trophy, two Twenty20 Internationals and Test matches in 2011, 2014 and 2018, when England played Sri Lanka and India. In 2020, the ground was used as one of two biosecure venues, alongside Old Trafford, for the tours involving the West Indies, Pakistan and Ireland which were regulated due to the COVID-19 pandemic.

In order to be able to host Test cricket, the ground underwent a redevelopment starting in 2008, which saw stands built to increase capacity and other construction work undertaken to make the hosting of international cricket at the ground more viable. A four-star Hilton Hotel with an integrated media centre overlooking the ground opened in 2015. Following Hampshire Cricket Ltd finding itself in financial trouble in 2011, the lease on the ground was sold to Eastleigh Borough Council for £6.5 million with a benefactor injecting a similar sum in 2012.

The Rose Bowl played host to the inaugural final of the 2019–21 ICC World Test Championship between India and New Zealand, resulting in New Zealand winning by eight wickets to be crowned the inaugural World Test Champions.

== History ==
=== Background ===
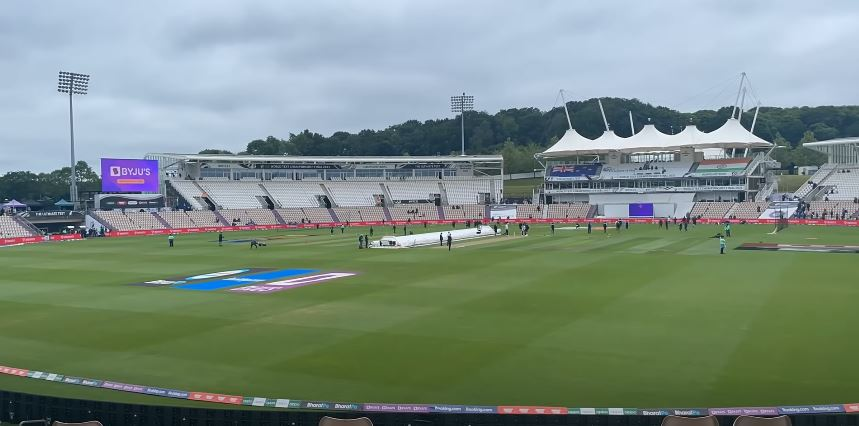
The cricket ground before the start of the play on day 6 of inaugural WTC Final 2021

Hampshire had played at their Northlands Road headquarters in Southampton since 1885, as well as using Dean Park in Bournemouth, the United Services Recreation Ground in Portsmouth and May's Bounty in Basingstoke as regular outground venues. Northlands Road was a cramped location, surrounded by residential buildings which meant expanding the ground was largely impossible. Hampshire also wanted to encourage international cricket to the county, which would not have been possible with Northlands Road. Talk of a move from Northlands Road had begun as early as 1987, with Mark Nicholas discussing the idea with then Hampshire vice-chairman Bill Hughes in a Leeds restaurant. A site was eventually selected just outside Southampton, in West End, on a gently sloping field owned by Queen's College, Oxford located between the M27 motorway and Telegraph Woods.

The ground was designed by architect Sir Michael Hopkins, whose design of the centrepiece pavilion with its tented roof was reminiscent of the Mound Stand at Lord's, which Hopkins also designed. Construction started on the ground in 1997, however, the budget for the ground's construction soon spiralled out of control, threatening the very existence of the club. Further funding was secured as construction continued until its first stage was completed in time for the 2001 season. Its final cost was £20 million, with a large part of that cost being secured with Lottery and Sport England funding, while the club's financial future was secured by the incoming chairman, Rod Bransgrove.

The ground is built into the side of the gently sloping hill on which it is located, resulting in an amphitheatre bowl. The initial name for the ground was announced in 2000 as The Rose Bowl, in recognition of the club's rose and crown logo and the bowl-shaped nature of the ground.

=== Early years ===
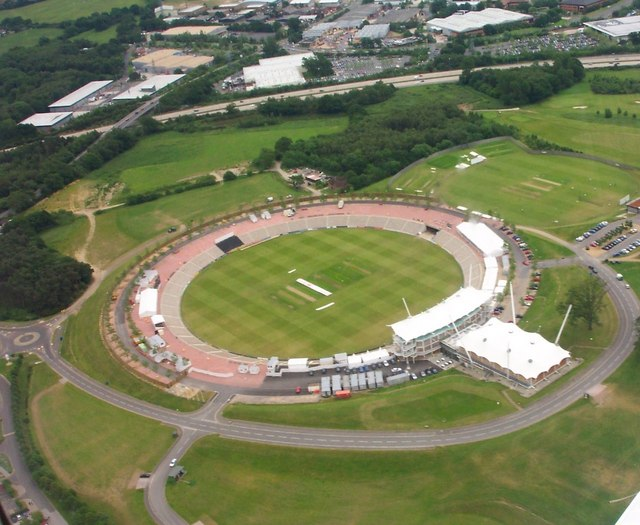
An aerial view of the Rose Bowl in 2004

Hampshire's first scheduled county match at the ground was a List A match in the 2001 Benson & Hedges Cup against Essex on 2 May, though the match was abandoned without a ball bowled due to rain, therefore the first completed match on the ground was a List A match in the same competition against Surrey on 4 May, which Hampshire lost. First-class cricket was first played there days later on 9–11 May, when Hampshire played Worcestershire in the County Championship, which resulted in Hampshire's first victory there with a 124 run victory. Hampshire were not the only tenant in the first year of the ground, with the Hampshire Cricket Board playing Ireland in September 2001 in the Cheltenham & Gloucester Trophy.

In November 2001, the England and Wales Cricket Board (ECB) awarded the Rose Bowl a Youth Test match between England Under-19s and India Under-19s. The following month the ECB announced the Rose Bowl would be awarded One Day International status with effect from 2004. The pavilion was completed in March 2002 at a cost of £2 million, and upon completion it was the only pavilion among the first-class counties to have jacuzzis in the players changing rooms.

In 2003, the ground played host to only the second ever Twenty20 match played, when Hampshire hosted Sussex in the Twenty20 Cup. The Rose Bowl hosted its first One Day International (ODI) on 10 July 2003, when South Africa played Zimbabwe in the 2003 NatWest Series, with numerous publications calling the hosting of the match a resounding success for Hampshire.

In 2004, the ground hosted another ODI between New Zealand and the West Indies in the 2004 NatWest Series, though the match was abandoned without a ball bowled. The ground later held five ODIs during that seasons Champions Trophy, which saw India post 290/4 against Kenya, the United States dismissed for 65 by Australia, and Mervyn Dillon take figures of 5/29 for the West Indies against Bangladesh: all three of these records remain to this day in terms of the highest and lowest innings scores in ODI cricket at the ground, as well as the best innings bowling figures. During the course of the tournament, England also played there for the first time, against Sri Lanka, though The Rose Bowl was criticised for its organisation of the match, with spectators citing access to the ground, long queues and stringent searches at the gate among complaints.

In 2005, England played their first ever Twenty20 International (T20I) against Australia as part of the build up to the Ashes series, with England winning the match by 100 runs.

In 2006, England played another T20I against Sri Lanka, which England won, due in large to Marcus Trescothick's 72. The Rose Bowl hosted three further ODIs prior to the grounds redevelopment, hosting Pakistan in 2006, India in 2007 and Australia in 2009. The ground held Twenty20 Cup Finals Day in 2008, which saw Middlesex defeat Kent in front of a capacity crowd. Prior to the redevelopment, major matches such as this match and international matches were catered for by erecting temporary seating to boost the grounds capacity from 6,500 to 15,000.

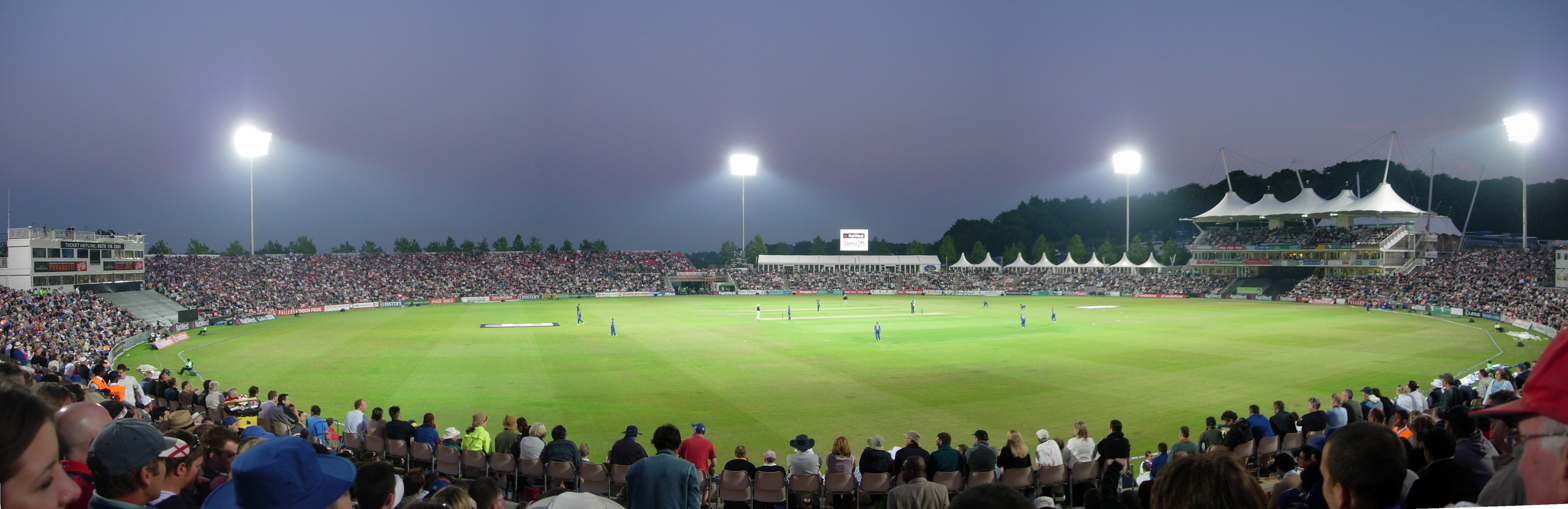
A view of the ground during England's 2006 T20 International against Sri Lanka

The early years at the ground were notable for immature wickets that favoured seam bowling, resulting in many low scoring encounters. The quality of these pitches drew much criticism. In the first season, seamer Alan Mullally took 8/90 against Warwickshire in the County Championship, which remains the best innings bowling figures at the ground. As the pitches settled down, higher scores became more frequent, though it was still more favourable to bowlers than batsmen. In 2005, Hampshire scored 714/5 against Nottinghamshire, in a match which also saw John Crawley record the first triple century at the ground. His unbeaten 311 helped Hampshire to reach that formidable total. These records remain to this day as the highest team and individual scores at the venue. Worcestershire posted the lowest first-class total at the ground in 2007, making 86.

=== Expansion ===
The attraction of international cricket to Hampshire was one of the main motivators facilitating Hampshire's move from Northlands Road. While Hampshire had hosted ODI cricket, obtaining Test cricket status still proved elusive. Hampshire had applied to the ECB for the venue to be given Test status, applying as early as 2006 for the right to host Test matches, however their application was rejected, with Glamorgan's SWALEC Stadium instead preferred to host a Test match during the 2009 Ashes series. This rejection persuaded Hampshire chairman Bransgrove to invest £35 million in redeveloping the ground, which would include the construction of a new access road to alleviate the transport problems which have affected major matches, the expansion of the ground's capacity and the construction of a hotel to make the Rose Bowl more financially viable for Hampshire. By the time permission had been granted for the first phase of the redevelopment to commence, costs had risen to £45 million.

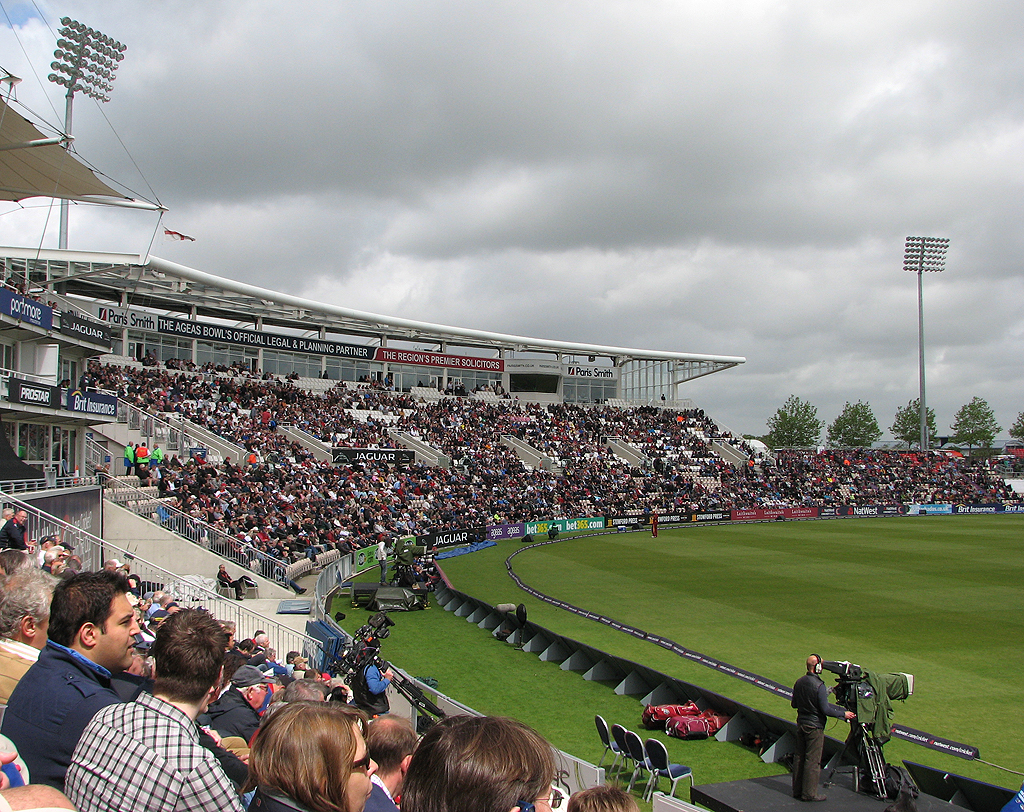
View of the pavilion and the Shane Warne Stand during an ODI between England and the West Indies in June 2012.

The plans called for the construction of two matching stands either side of the pavilion to increase the permanent capacity to 15,000, as well as a four-star, 175-room hotel overlooking the ground at the northern end. Access problems for spectators were to be eased by creating two ticket gates to access to ground, as well as creating an additional access road off Moorhill Road.

The redevelopment plans led to the ECB awarding the Rose Bowl Test status and a Test match between England and Sri Lanka in 2011, with the redevelopment scheduled to be completed before the Test match. The redevelopment was beset with a number of problems. During the construction of the new stands, a construction worker was crushed to death in February 2009, while prior to the Test match the new access road still had not been constructed. Meanwhile, legal action by local hoteliers led to the construction of the hotel at the Northern End being put on hold, with the hoteliers objecting to the possible impact on competition and to the use of public funds from Eastleigh Borough Council.

As part of their preparations for the Test match, the Rose Bowl was awarded the right to host finals day of the 2010 Friends Provident t20, during which Hampshire became the first county to win the final at their home ground, when they defeated Somerset in controversial circumstances. Also in 2010, the Rose Bowl was voted "Best International Ground" in an independent ECB survey of fans around the country and was also voted the "Most Improved Ground" by readers of All Out Cricket magazine.

The first Test match was played on 16–20 June 2011. It was a heavily rain affected match that ended in a draw, but did see Ian Bell and Kumar Sangakkara score the first Test centuries at the ground, in addition to Chris Tremlett taking the first five wicket haul.

Hampshire found themselves £12 million in debt by the end of the 2011 season. With the county unable to maintain the upkeep of the ground from their own finances, the decision was taken to sell the lease from Queens College Oxford (the Landlord) to Eastleigh Borough Council and to sub-lease from the council with buy-back options. This transaction was conditional on a further injection of £6 million from Rod Bransgrove and was completed in January 2012. The council also administered some £30 million Prudential Funding from Central Government for the building of the hotel, which was given the go-ahead after the legal action by local hoteliers was quashed at the High Court.

On 29 August 2013, the Australian opener Aaron Finch set a new record for Twenty20 international cricket when he scored 156 runs off 63 balls for Australia against England at the Rose Bowl. Finch's innings included 14 sixes (also a record) and 11 fours. The previous record was 123 runs, scored by Brendon McCullum of New Zealand. In 2020 the ground was used as one of two biosecure venues, alongside Old Trafford, for the tours involving West Indies, Pakistan and Ireland which were regulated due to the COVID-19 pandemic.

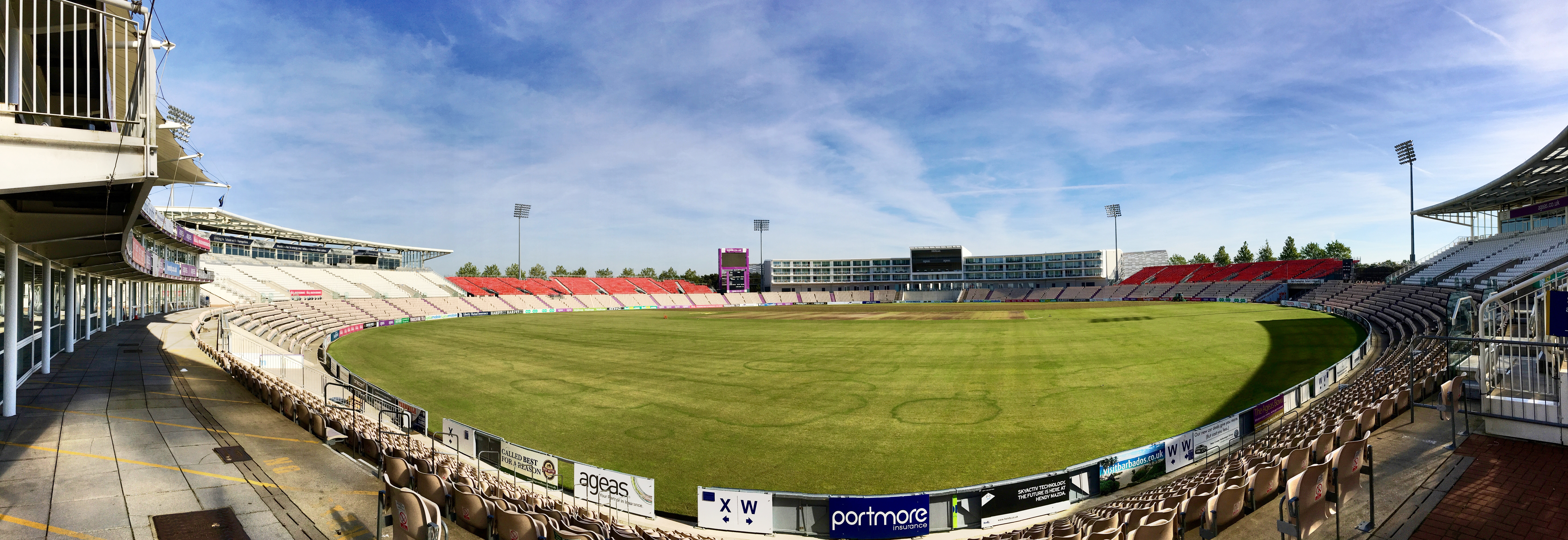
Panorama in 2015 looking north from the pavilion

=== Naming rights ===
The cricket club announced in February 2012 that a six-year sponsorship deal had been signed with Ageas, an insurance provider headquartered in nearby Eastleigh. The deal included naming rights for the ground, which officially became known as the Ageas Bowl. The deal was extended, but in June 2023 the insurer announced that the partnership was coming to an end at the end of the season. In January 2024, a new deal was announced with Utilita Energy, with the official name of the venue becoming the Utilita Bowl.

== Facilities and functions ==
=== Utilita Bowl Nursery Ground ===
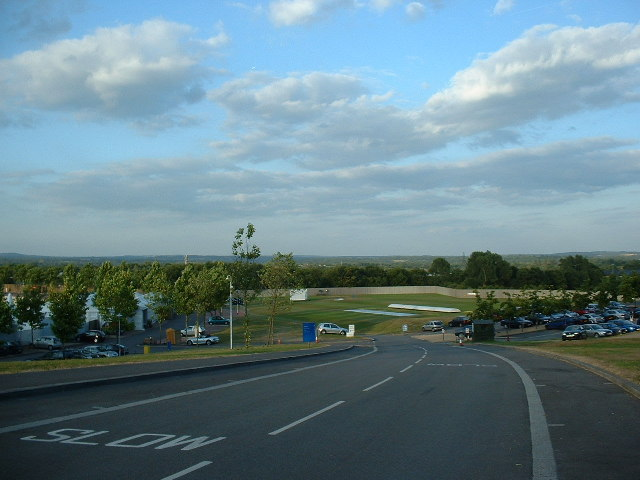
A view of the Nursery Ground

Besides the main cricket ground at the Rose Bowl, an additional satellite ground borders the main ground to the south-east. Known as the Nursery Ground, it hosts Hampshire Second XI matches at the Hampshire Academy in Southern Premier Cricket League matches. Its end names are the Northern End and the Golf Club End. Its pavilion is named after Arthur Holt, who coached Hampshire from 1949 to 1965. The Nursery Ground has hosted one first-class match, Hampshire v Loughborough MCCU in April 2013.

The main pavilion, now known as the Rod Bransgrove Pavilion, holds the players facilities, as well as facilities for club members, such as the Robin Smith Suite, Derek Shackleton suite, the Richards Suite, the Greenidge Suite and The Hambledons (a suite named after the famous Hambledon Club). Located between the pavilion and the cricket academy building is the atrium restaurant. The cricket academy, which has six lanes of cricket nets is used by county squads, the Hampshire Academy, cricket clubs and schools. It is known to have some of the best facilities of its kind outside of Lord's and is available for hire by the general public. The two new stands include permanent catering facilities along the internal concourse of the ground floor, which were lacking prior to the redevelopment. Also located on the ground floor of the west stand is the club shop. Both of the new stands contain suites which can be used for conferences and exhibitions outside of match days. The stands are named after two of Hampshire's most popular captains, Colin Ingleby-MacKenzie and Shane Warne.

Also part of the Rose Bowl complex is the Boundary Lakes Golf Club, an eighteen-hole golf course opened in 2017 and set in the rolling countryside which surrounds large parts of the main stadium. The current clubhouse and golf shop are located in the Hilton Hotel. It is hoped the course will be able to host major championship golf tournaments in the future. A David Lloyd health club (formerly Virgin Active) is also onsite.

Every November the venue hosts one of the largest fireworks displays on the South Coast. It also acts as a venue big-name music concerts. Recent acts to have performed there include Oasis in 2005, who performed in front of 35,000 people, Billy Joel in 2006, the Who in 2007, Neil Diamond and R.E.M., both in 2008, Rod Stewart in 2016, Bryan Adams and Little Mix, both in 2017. Arctic Monkeys in 2023 The late Italian opera singer Luciano Pavarotti was due to play at the ground in 2006, but cancelled his farewell UK tour due to ill health.

== List of centuries ==
As of 26 June 2021

=== Test centuries ===
As of June 2021 a total of 8 centuries have been scored in Test cricket on the ground.

Centuries in Men's Test Matches at the Rose Bowl
No.	Score	Player	Team	Balls	Inns.	Opposing team	Date	Result
1	119	Ian Bell (1/2)	England	169	2	Sri Lanka	16 June 2011	Drawn
2	119*	Kumar Sangakkara	Sri Lanka	249	3	England	16 June 2011	Drawn
3	156	Gary Ballance	England	288	1	India	27 July 2014	Won
4	167	Ian Bell (2/2)	England	256	1	India	27 July 2014	Won
5	132*	Cheteshwar Pujara	India	257	2	England	30 August 2018	Lost
6	267	Zak Crawley	England	393	1	Pakistan	21 August 2020	Drawn
7	152	Jos Buttler	England	311	1	Pakistan	21 August 2020	Drawn
8	141*	Azhar Ali	Pakistan	272	2	England	21 August 2020	Drawn

=== One-Day International centuries ===
As of August 2025 a total of 25 centuries have been scored in one-day international cricket on the ground.

Centuries in Men's One-Day Internationals at the Rose Bowl
No.	Score	Player	Team	Balls	Inns.	Opposing team	Date	Result
1	104	Andrew Flintoff	England	91	1	Sri Lanka	17 September 2004	Won
2	101	Younis Khan	Pakistan	109	2	England	5 September 2006	Won
3	102	Alastair Cook	England	126	1	India	21 August 2007	Won
4	126*	Ian Bell (1/2)	England	118	1	India	21 August 2007	Won
5	105	Cameron White	Australia	124	2	England	9 September 2009	Won
6	103*	Eoin Morgan (1/3)	England	85	2	Australia	22 June 2010	Won
7	107*	Eoin Morgan (2/3)	England	101	1	Pakistan	22 September 2010	Won
8	126	Ian Bell (2/2)	England	117	1	West Indies	16 June 2012	Won
9	150	Hashim Amla	South Africa	124	1	England	28 August 2012	Won
10	189*	Martin Guptill	New Zealand	155	1	England	2 June 2013	Won
11	109*	Jonathan Trott	England	104	2	New Zealand	2 June 2013	Lost
12	143	Shane Watson	Australia	107	1	England	16 September 2013	Won
13	118	Kane Williamson	New Zealand	113	2	England	14 June 2015	Won
14	110	Ross Taylor	New Zealand	123	2	England	14 June 2015	Won
15	101	Ben Stokes	England	79	1	South Africa	27 May 2017	Won
16	141*	Jonny Bairstow	England	114	2	West Indies	29 September 2017	Won
17	110*	Jos Buttler	England	55	1	Pakistan	11 May 2019	Won
18	138	Fakhar Zaman	Pakistan	106	2	England	11 May 2019	Lost
19	122*	Rohit Sharma	India	144	2	South Africa	5 June 2019	Won
20	100*	Joe Root (1/2)	England	94	2	West Indies	14 June 2019	Won
21	106	Eoin Morgan (3/3)	England	84	1	Ireland	4 August 2020	Lost
22	142	Paul Stirling	Ireland	128	2	England	4 August 2020	Won
23	113	Andy Balbirnie	Ireland	112	2	England	4 August 2020	Won
24	100	Joe Root (2/2)	England	96	1	South Africa	7 September 2025	Won
25	110	Jacob Bethell	England	82	1	South Africa	7 September 2025	Won

== List of five-wicket hauls ==
As of 26 June 2021

=== Test match five-wicket hauls ===
As of June 2021, 12 five-wicket hauls have been taken in international matches on the ground, eight in Test matches and four in ODIs.

Five-wicket hauls in Men's Test matches at the Rose Bowl
No.	Bowler	Date	Team	Opposing Team	Inn	O	R	W	Result
1	Chris Tremlett	16 June 2011	England	Sri Lanka	1	20	48	6	Drawn
2	James Anderson (Note: Anderson and Moeen took their five-wicket hauls during the same match.)	27 July 2014	England	India	2	26.1	53	5	England won
3	Moeen Ali	27 July 2014	England	India	4	20.4	67	6	England won
4	Moeen Ali	30 August 2018	England	India	2	16	63	5	England won
5	Jason Holder (Note: Holder and Gabriel took their five-wicket hauls during the same match.)	8 July 2020	West Indies	England	1	20	42	6	West Indies won
6	Shannon Gabriel	8 July 2020	West Indies	England	3	21.2	75	5	West Indies won
7	James Anderson	23 August 2020	England	Pakistan	1	23	56	5	Drawn
8	Kyle Jamieson	20 June 2021	New Zealand	India	1	22	31	5	New Zealand won

=== One Day International five-wicket hauls ===
Five-wicket hauls in Men's One Day Internationals at the Rose Bowl
No.	Bowler	Date	Team	Opposing Team	Inn	O	R	W	Result
1	Mervyn Dillon	15 September 2004 (Note: This match was part of the 2004 Champions Trophy.)	West Indies	Bangladesh	2	10	29	5	West Indies won
2	Ben Stokes	16 September 2013	England	Australia	1	10	61	5	Australia won
3	Shakib Al Hasan	24 June 2019 (Note: This match was part of the 2019 Cricket World Cup.)	Bangladesh	Afghanistan	2	10	29	5	Bangladesh won
4	David Willey	30 July 2020	England	Ireland	1	8.4	30	5	England won

== Other International records on the ground ==
=== Test ===
- Highest team total: 583/8d by England against Pakistan, 2020
- Lowest team total: 170 by India against New Zealand, 2021
- Highest individual innings: 267 by Zak Crawley for England against Pakistan, 2020
- Best bowling in an innings: 6/42 by Jason Holder for West Indies against England, 2020
- Best bowling in a match: 9/137 by Shannon Gabriel for West Indies against England, 2020

=== One-Day International ===
- Highest team total: 414/5 (50 overs) by England against South Africa, 2025
- Lowest team total: 65 (24 overs) by USA against Australia, 2004
- Highest individual innings: 189 not out by Martin Guptill for New Zealand against England, 2013
- Best bowling in an innings: 5/29 by Mervyn Dillon for West Indies against Bangladesh, 2004 and 5/29 by Shakib Al Hasan for Bangladesh against Afghanistan, 2019

=== Twenty20 International ===
- Highest team total: 257/3 (20 overs) by England against India, 2026
- Lowest team total: 79 (14.3 overs) by Australia against England, 2005
- Highest individual innings: 156 by Aaron Finch for Australia against England, 2013
- Best bowling in an innings: 4/22 by Paul Collingwood for England against Australia, 2005

== Domestic records ==
=== First-class ===
- Highest team total: 714/5d by Hampshire against Nottinghamshire, 2005
- Lowest team total: 86 by Worcestershire against Hampshire, 2007
- Highest individual innings: 311* by John Crawley for Hampshire against Nottinghamshire, 2005
- Best bowling in an innings: 8/90 by Alan Mullally for Hampshire against Warwickshire, 2001
- Best bowling in a match: 11/59 by Kyle Hogg for Lancashire against Hampshire, 2011

=== List A ===
- Highest team total: 350/5 (50 overs) by Gloucestershire against Hampshire, 2008
- Lowest team total: 101 (36.4 overs) by Sussex against Hampshire, 2003
- Highest individual innings: 167* by Sean Ervine for Hampshire against Ireland, 2009
- Best bowling in an innings: 6/27 by Stuart Clark for Hampshire against Surrey, 2007

=== Twenty20 ===
- Highest team total: 225/2 (20 overs) by Hampshire against Middlesex, 2006
- Lowest team total: 72 (14 overs) by Kent against Hampshire, 2011
- Highest individual innings: 124 not out by Michael Lumb for Hampshire against Essex, 2009
- Best bowling in an innings: 5/19 by Danny Briggs for Hampshire against Durham, 2011

== Ground images ==
=== Before redevelopment ===
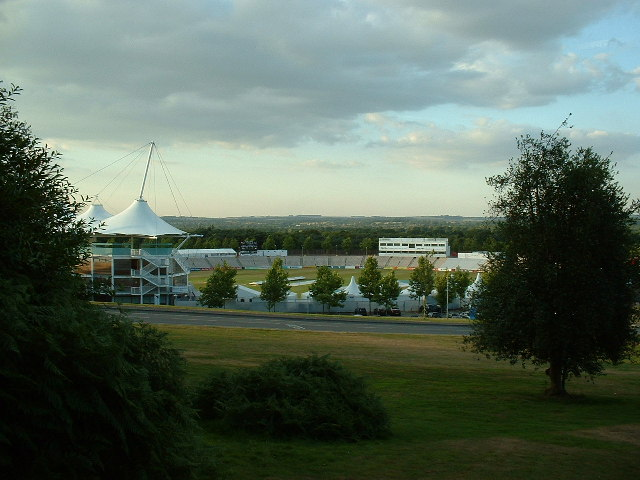
View from the Pavilion End, looking toward the Northern End of the ground.

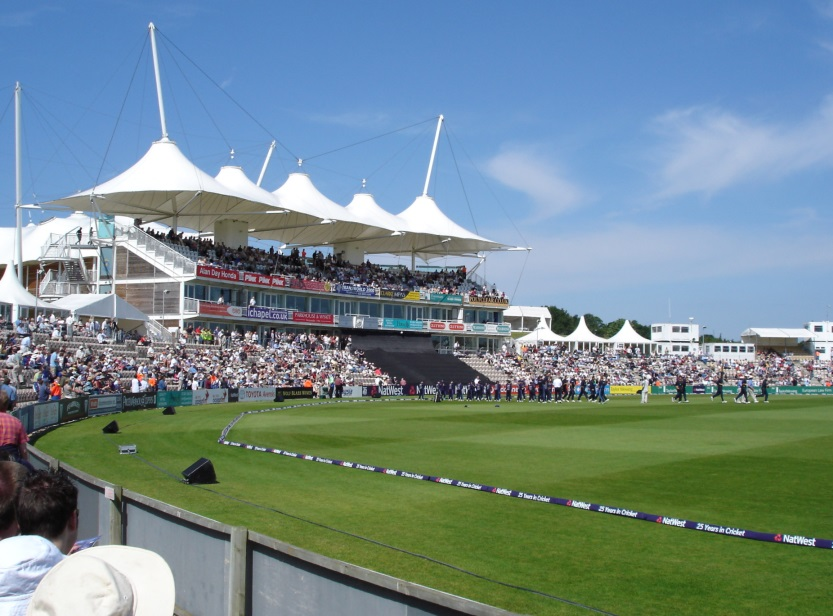
Main pavilion at the Rose Bowl. The England team are taking to the field in a friendly match against Hampshire.

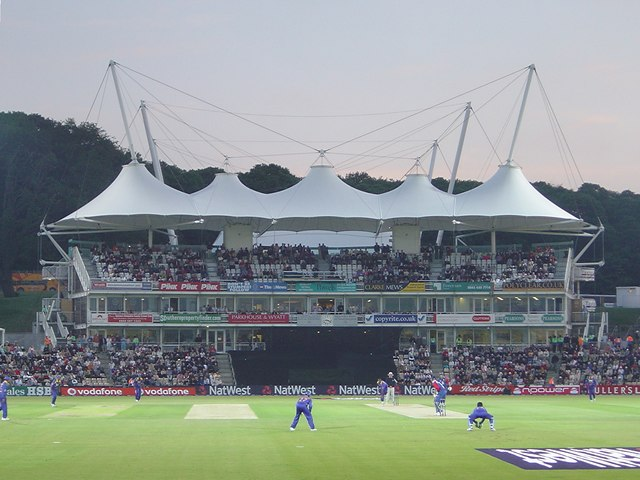
Another view of the pavilion.

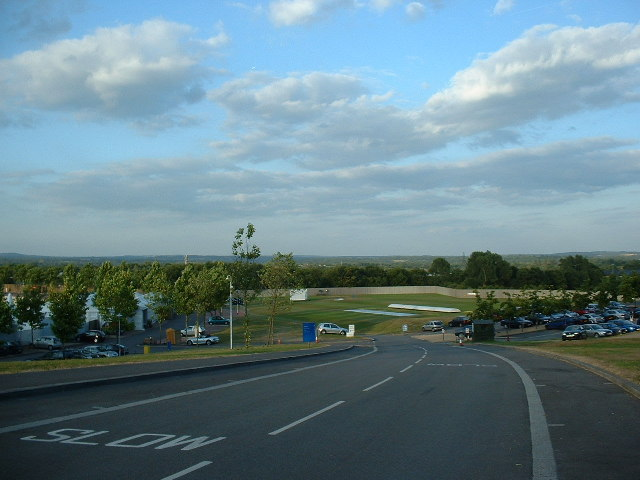
Nursery Ground.

=== After redevelopment ===
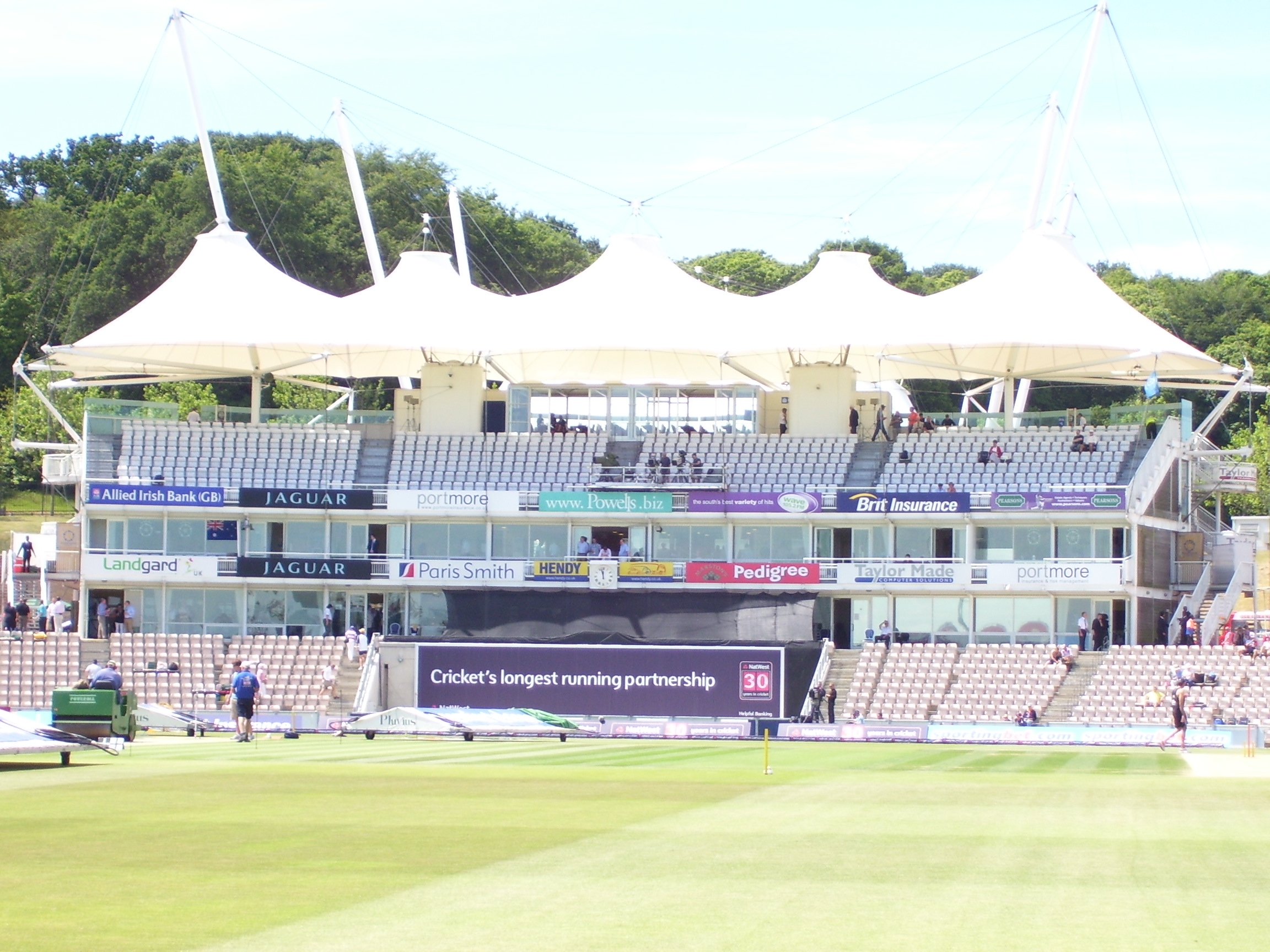
The pavilion, with seating section removed.

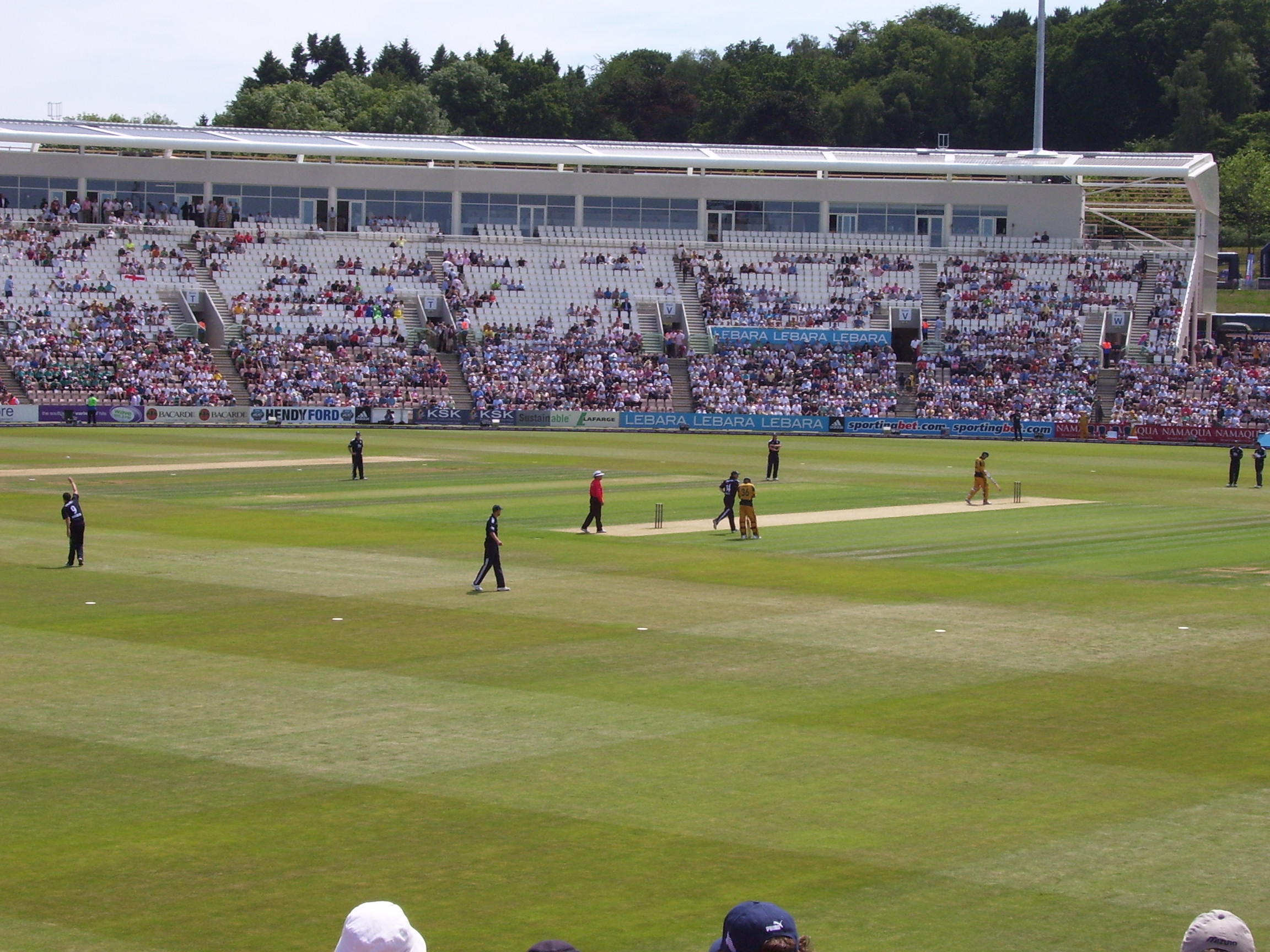
The East Stand. Top right of the stand is the Shaun Udal suite.

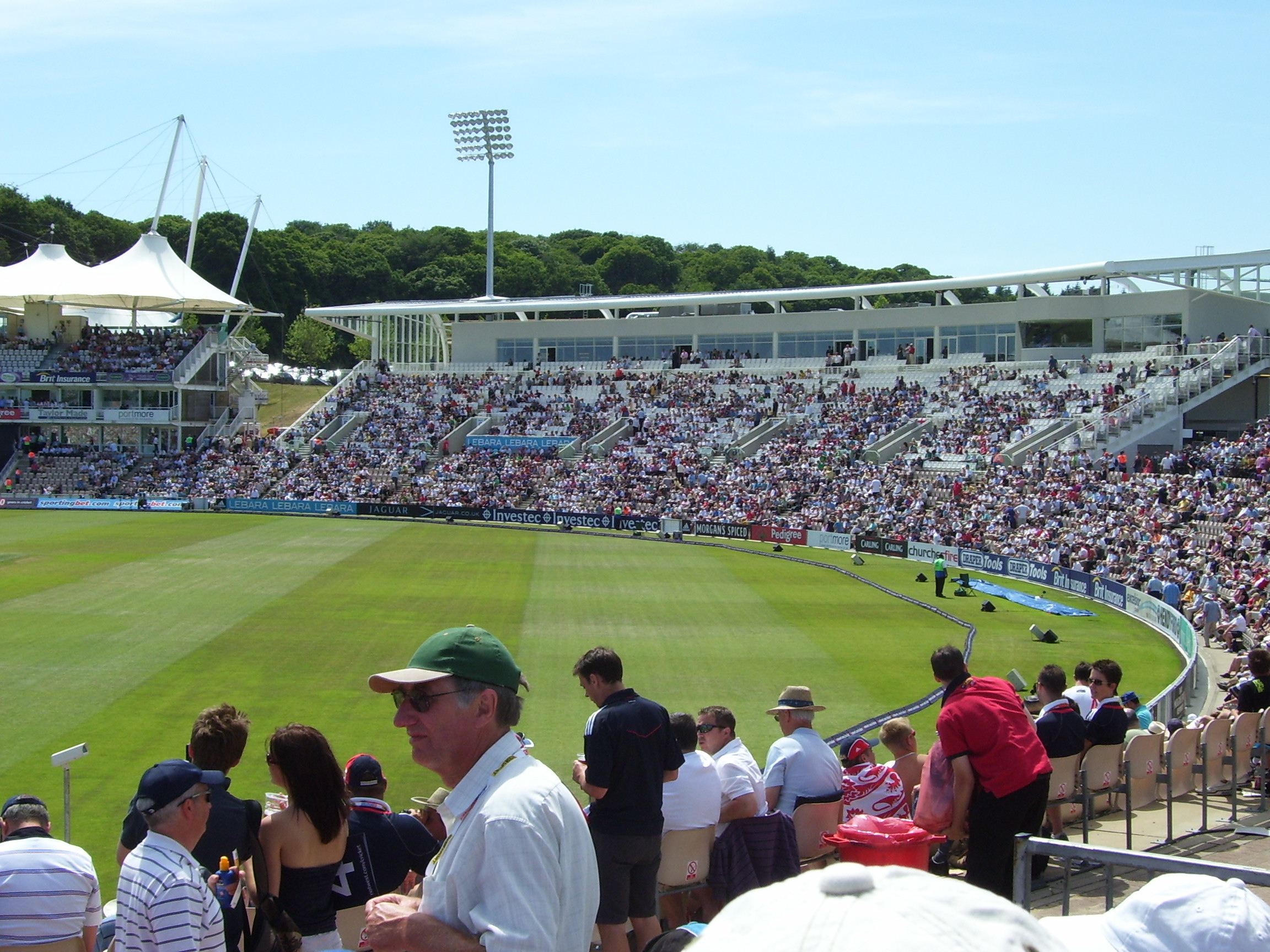
The new West Stand. Top left of the stand is the Shane Warne suite.

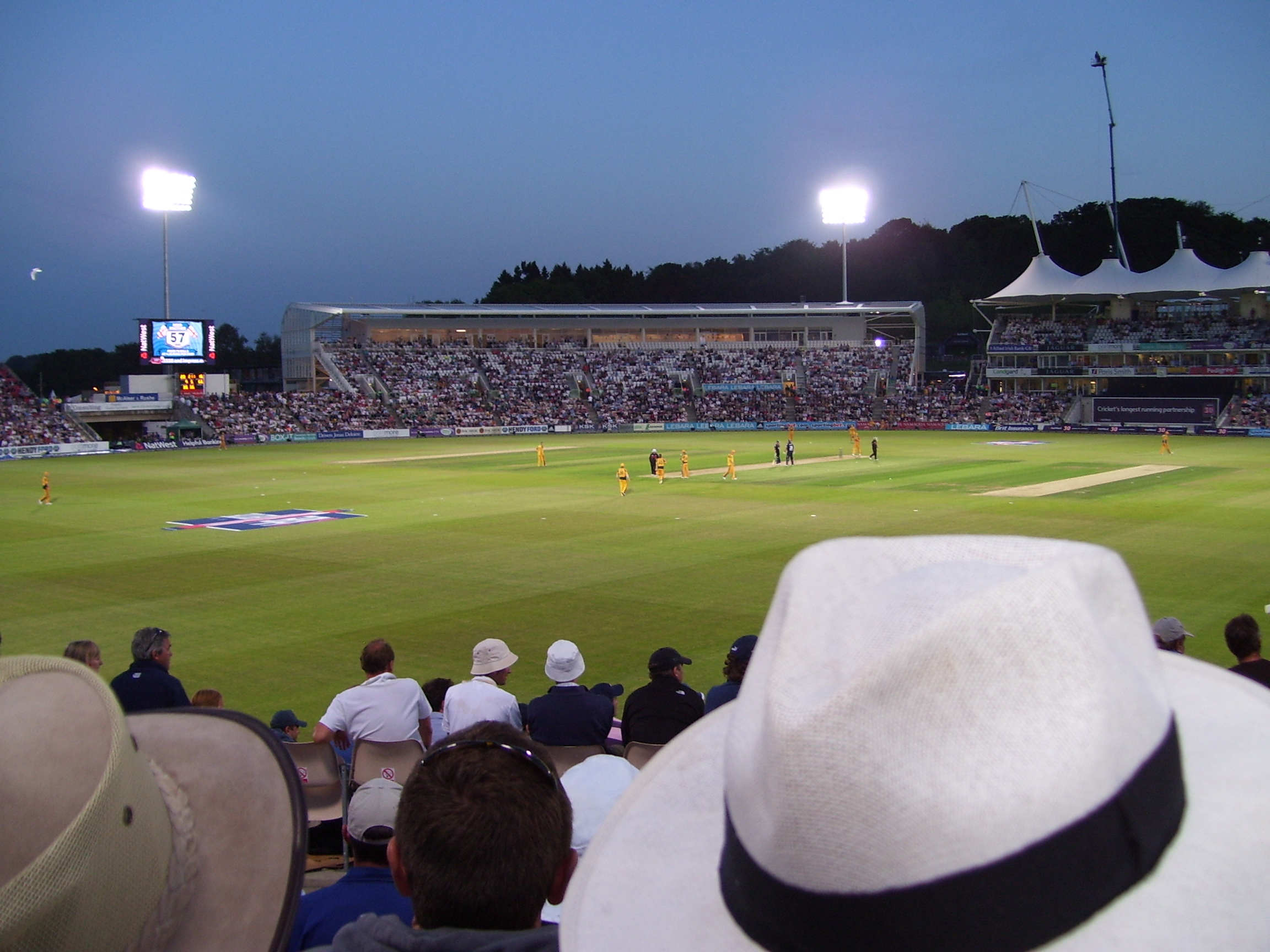
The new East Stand under floodlights during an England v Australia ODI in 2010.

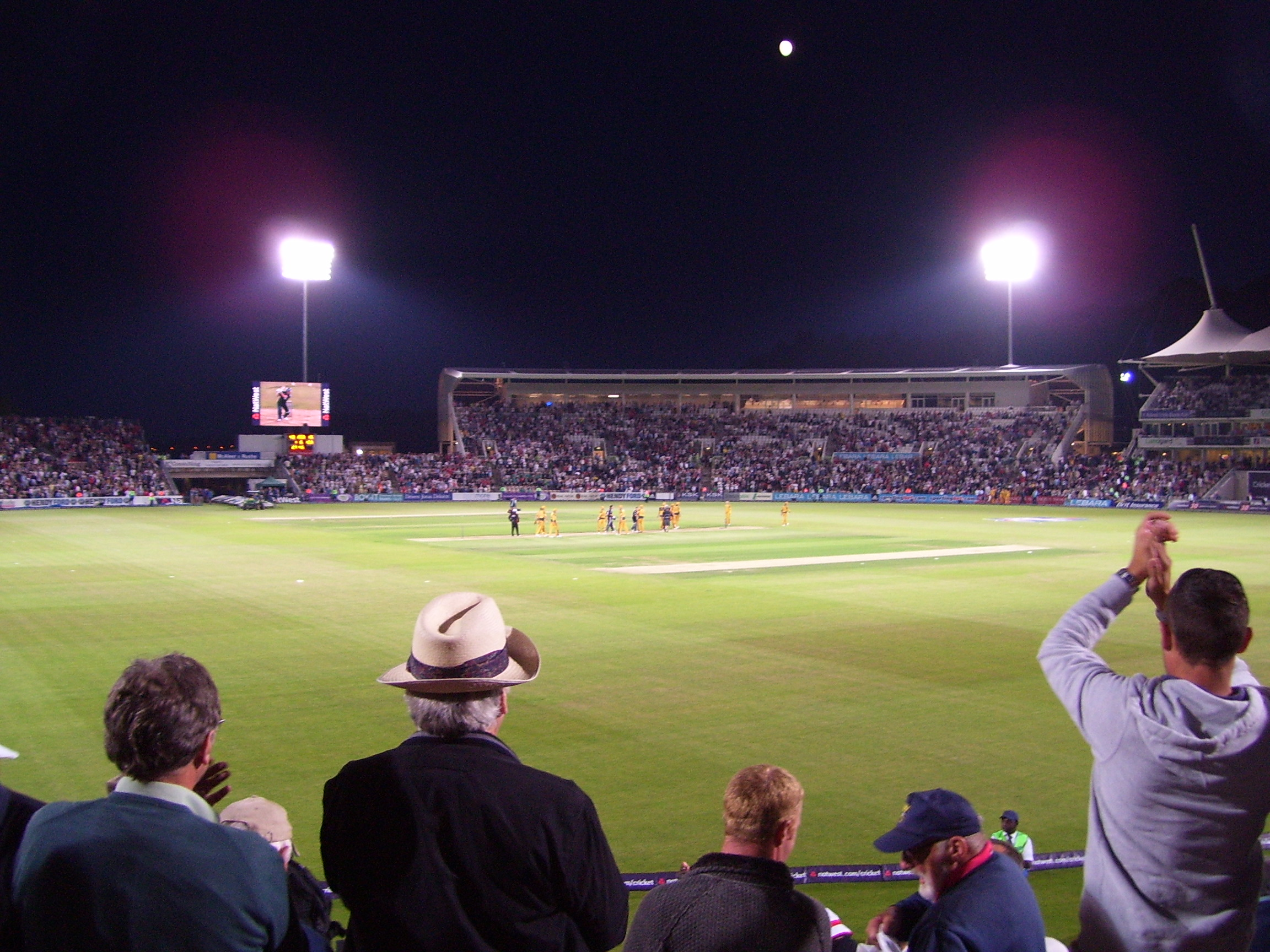
Similar view of the East Stand, in the foreground Eoin Morgan has just brought up his century with the winning runs.

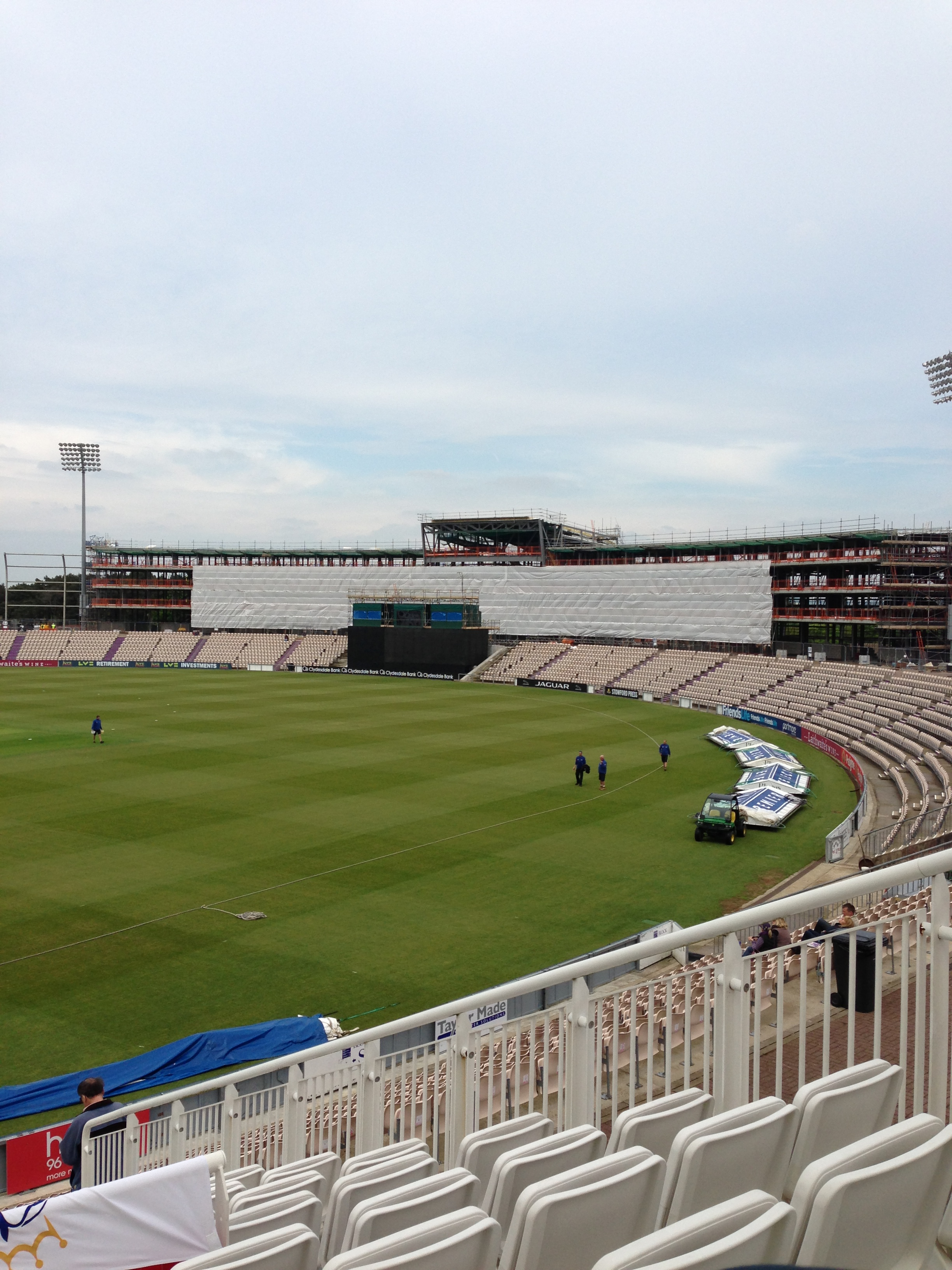
The Hilton Hotel under construction in May 2013.

== See also ==
- List of Hampshire County Cricket Club grounds
- List of cricket grounds in England and Wales
- List of Test cricket grounds
