= Laddie Outschoorn =

English cricketer

Personal information
- Full name: Ladislaus Frederick Outschoorn
- Born: 26 September 1918; Colombo, Ceylon
- Died: 9 January 1994 (aged 75); Westminster, England
- Batting: Right-handed
- Bowling: Right-handed medium
- Role: Batsman

Domestic team information
- Years: Team
- 1946–1959: Worcestershire
- FC debut: 31 July 1946 Worcestershire v Combined Services
- Last FC: 8 September 1959 Commonwealth XI v England XI

Career statistics
Competition	First-class
Matches	346
Runs scored	15,496
Batting average	28.59
100s/50s	25/81
Top score	215*
Balls bowled	3,890
Wickets	33
Bowling average	61.51
5 wickets in innings	0
10 wickets in match	0
Best bowling	2/15
Catches/stumpings	277/–
- Source: CricketArchive, 22 November 2008

Ladislaus Frederick "Laddie" Outschoorn (26 September 1918 – 9 January 1994) was a Ceylonese first-class cricketer, a right-handed batsman and occasional right-arm medium-pace bowler who played for Worcestershire in the years after the Second World War.

== Life and career ==
Outschoorn was born in Colombo, Ceylon. While working in Malaya, he played two matches for the Straits Settlements against the Federated Malay States in 1939 and 1940. He was taken prisoner by the Japanese in World War II, and went to England afterwards for rehabilitation.

He made his first-class debut in July 1946 for Worcestershire against Combined Services at New Road, scoring 3 and 9. His career proper began in 1947, when he played 21 times for the county, although averaging a mediocre 23.39 with a top score of only 66. He improved markedly the following summer, passing 1,000 runs for the first time, hitting his first century, exactly 100 not out against Derbyshire, and gaining his county cap. He also took his first wickets in 1948, when he took three in a match against Gloucestershire in May; his victims (George Emmett, Tom Goddard and Charlie Barnett) were all Test cricketers.

Outschoorn was a champion close fielder in slip or gully; in 1949 he took 55 catches, more than any other fieldsman in England. Although he never surpassed the 12 wickets he claimed in 1948, his batting continued to improve, and he passed 1,000 runs in seven of the next eight seasons, helped in 1949 by his career-best score of 215 not out against Northamptonshire. His best year was probably 1951, when he made 1,761 runs at 35.93 (his best season's average) including four centuries, as well as taking 43 catches. Outschoorn's batting declined in the late 1950s, although he rallied himself for his last season, 1959, when he made 1,271 first-class runs.

He had an eccentric style of batting, "[rocking] back to cut at almost anything, half-volleys even, or [jumping] out of the crease to make full-tosses of good length balls". Unusually for a cricketer of the period, he exercised with weights every morning.

Only five of Outschoorn's 346 first-class games were for a team other than Worcestershire, all for a Commonwealth XI against an England XI at the end-of-season Hastings Festival. His last first-class innings, in September 1959, was for the Commonwealth XI: he made 58 before being dismissed by John Mortimore. He played for Worcestershire's second team on several occasions in 1960.

He was appointed national coach of Ceylon in 1966. He died in Westminster at the age of 75.
