= Municipal Ground =

Cricket ground in Hampshire, England

- Interactive map of Municipal Ground

Ground information
- Location: Alton, Hampshire
- Country: England
- Coordinates: 51.1553°N 0.9633°W
- Establishment: 1890

Team information
Hampshire	(1904)
- As of 21 October 2009; Source: Ground profile

The Municipal Ground (also known as the Alton Recreation and Sports Ground) and locally at different times as the Courage Ground and Bass Sports Ground was a cricket ground in Alton, Hampshire.

== History ==
Construction

The ground was constructed as a result of the efforts of G.J. Poole, the headmaster of a local Grammar School. Construction was started by the formation of a company in the year 1890. The ground was built on land adjacent to the old Eggar's Grammar School; the old Eggar's Grammar School is a Grade II listed building now being used for housing.

First-Class Cricket Match

Completed by 1899, the Hampshire Second XI played there in the ground's first recorded match in that year, while Hampshire later played one first-class match at the ground, against the touring South Africans in 1904. The match ended in a South African victory by innings and 19 runs, during which South African batsman Louis Tancred was dismissed for 99 by Hesketh Hesketh-Prichard, while in Hampshire's first-innings Johannes Kotze took a five wicket haul with figures of 5 for 66.

Ownership

The Municipal Ground was sold by the original owners and acquired at different times by various local breweries who used the facilities as a social club for their staff and provided general usage for the town's citizens.

Brewing has a long tradition in Alton dating back to 1763. With clean spring water from the chalk hills and the fine quality of locally grown hops and barley, the size of market for Alton Ales was increased by the arrival of the railway in 1852 and the development of Aldershot as a military town from 1860. This saw beer production in Alton greatly expanded and the town prosper. By 1900, there were two major breweries in the town, the Alton Brewery Co. Ltd (formerly "Halls") and Crowley & Co.

In 1903, the Alton Brewery Co. Ltd was taken over by Courage of London ("Courage"). It is unclear whether Courage acquired the Municipal Ground at this time through the purchase of the Alton Brewery Co. Ltd or as a separate later transaction. It seems likely that the Municipal Ground was still owned by the original corporation at the time of the First Class cricket match.

Courage & Company (Alton) FC joined the Hampshire League in 1928/9 which would suggest that they would be using the Municipal Grounds for home matches and the ground may have been under the brewery's ownership by this date. The Municipal Ground is documented as owned by Courage & Company in1932.

Courage continued to operate a brewery in the town until the 1970s, before announcing a move to Reading and the closure of its brewing operations in Alton. On the 25 September 1979, the Courage site, the Municipal Ground, pump/well and old maltings were purchased by Bass Brewing Company.("Bass")

In June 2000, it was announced that, due to the government's beer order policies designed to limit the size of big brewer's pub empires, Bass was to sell its brewing arm to the Belgian group Interbrew. Interbrew had already purchased the Whitbread breweries in May 2000, leaving it with a 84% slice of the beer market in the U.K. Early in 2001, the sale of the Bass brewing arm was referred to the Monopolies and Mergers Commission, whose eventual recommendations included that Interbrew had to sell some of its breweries and brands.

As a result of this, the brewery and the Municipal Ground found new owners in Coors, an American based drinks company. A deal was signed in the early hours of Christmas Eve 2001.

Use of the Ground

The ground was approximately 170 yards by 160 yards in shape. This rectangular shape and size of the field was unique among cricket grounds in Alton, with The Butts (triangular) and Anstey Park (1950s) (much larger open parkland and two pitches). The current home of Alton Cricket Club at Jubilee Playing Fields was completed in 1977 (incorporating three cricket pitches).

The Municipal Ground was home to Courage (Alton) Cricket Club, renamed Bass (Alton) Cricket Club in 1979, until the club folded in the 1990s. Alton Town Football Club played at the ground after they merged in the 1990s with the incumbent Bass Alton FC (the successors to Courage & Company (Alton) FC). Alton Town Football Club moved back to their original ground in Anstey Lane at the end of 2015 when the Municipal Ground was redeveloped.

The Municipal Ground was also home to tennis and bowls clubs.

The bowls club was founded in the 1950s by a number of Courage employees. Originally games were played at the back of Swathmore House in Alton High Street before a bowling green was laid at the Municipal Ground, around the end of the 1950s. The Bowls club was relocated when the ground was redeveloped to a new facility at Chawton Park Road, Alton.

Tennis was played at the Municipal Ground until 1994 when the Bass Sports Tennis Club moved to a new site near the Alton Sports Centre at Chawton Park Road and was renamed Alton Tennis Club.

The Municipal Ground represented the main sports facility in the town until the council acquired Anstey Manor and its land in 1946, in turn selling the manor house and 11 acres to the Alton Convent, to be turned into a school. The rest of the land was used to create Anstey Park for sports and recreational purposes, including cricket, rugby, football and the building of a town lido.

Anstey Park became home to Alton Cricket Club and Alton Town Football Club creating a local rivalry between the "Townsmen" and the "Brewers" at senior county league level, often between neighbors.

Structures and Buildings

For many years, a small pavilion stood in the south-west corner of the Municipal Ground next to the Alton to London railway line. The pavilion was used as changing facilities for cricket and football and was still standing (but had fallen into disuse) when the ground was redeveloped as a result of a new clubhouse being built on the opposite side of the ground in 1982.

Tennis courts, the bowling green and a Football Stand were located to the north of the field running alongside Anstey Road.

Aerial photographs of Alton from 1928 show the Municipal Ground as a playing field with no obvious structures suggesting that the pavilion, football stand and tennis courts had not been constructed at this point. The car park was located in the north-east corner with an entrance almost opposite Anstey Lane.

Ground Redevelopment

By early 2010, Coors had transferred most of its beer production to Burton Upon Trent and the Alton brewery was only producing contract beers at lower capacity. This brought the long-term future of the brewery and the Municipal Ground into question.

Just before Christmas 2014, the company announced that they had received planning permission to redevelop the Municipal Ground for residential housing, and that the brewery would close at the end of May 2015, with the loss of 105 jobs.

In 2016, the Municipal Ground was sold by Coors for £6.7 million. The old site of the Municipal Ground is now occupied by housing and apartment blocks on a road called Goswell Square with access through Murray Grove.

== See also ==
- List of Hampshire County Cricket Club grounds
- List of cricket grounds in England and Wales
