= Victoria Recreation Ground =

Park on the Isle of Wight, England

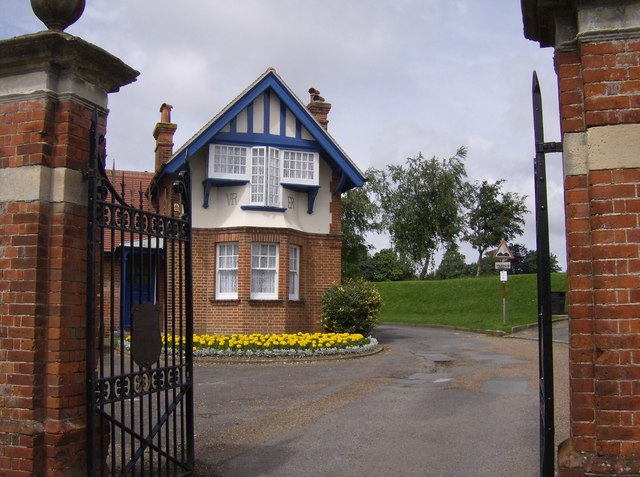
- Entrance to the ground

Ground information
- Location: Newport, Isle of Wight
- Country: England
- Coordinates: 50.6968°N 1.3065°W
- Establishment: circa 1902

Team information
Hampshire	(1938–1939)
- As of 21 October 2009; Source: Ground profile

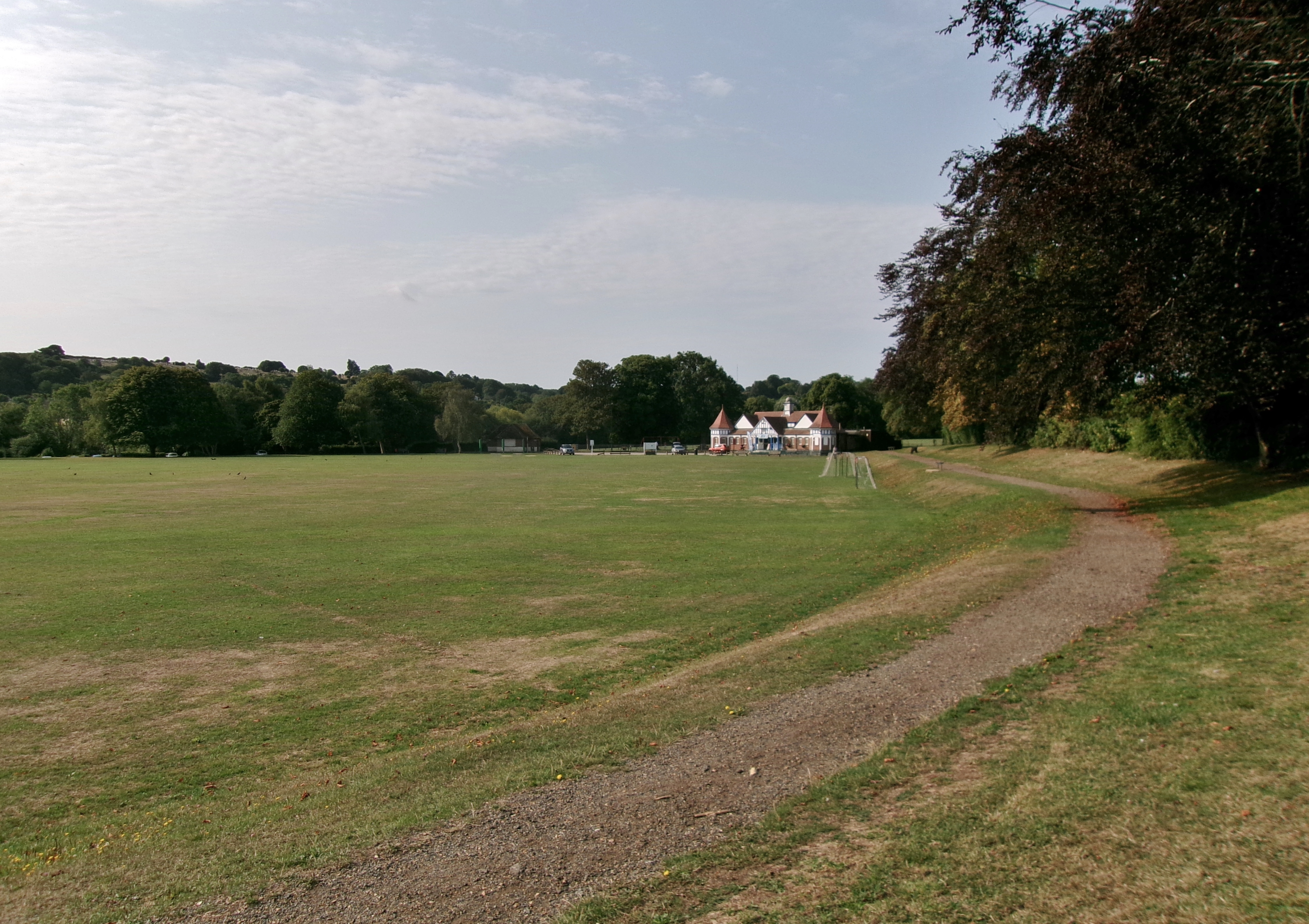
View of the ground with the pavilion in the distance

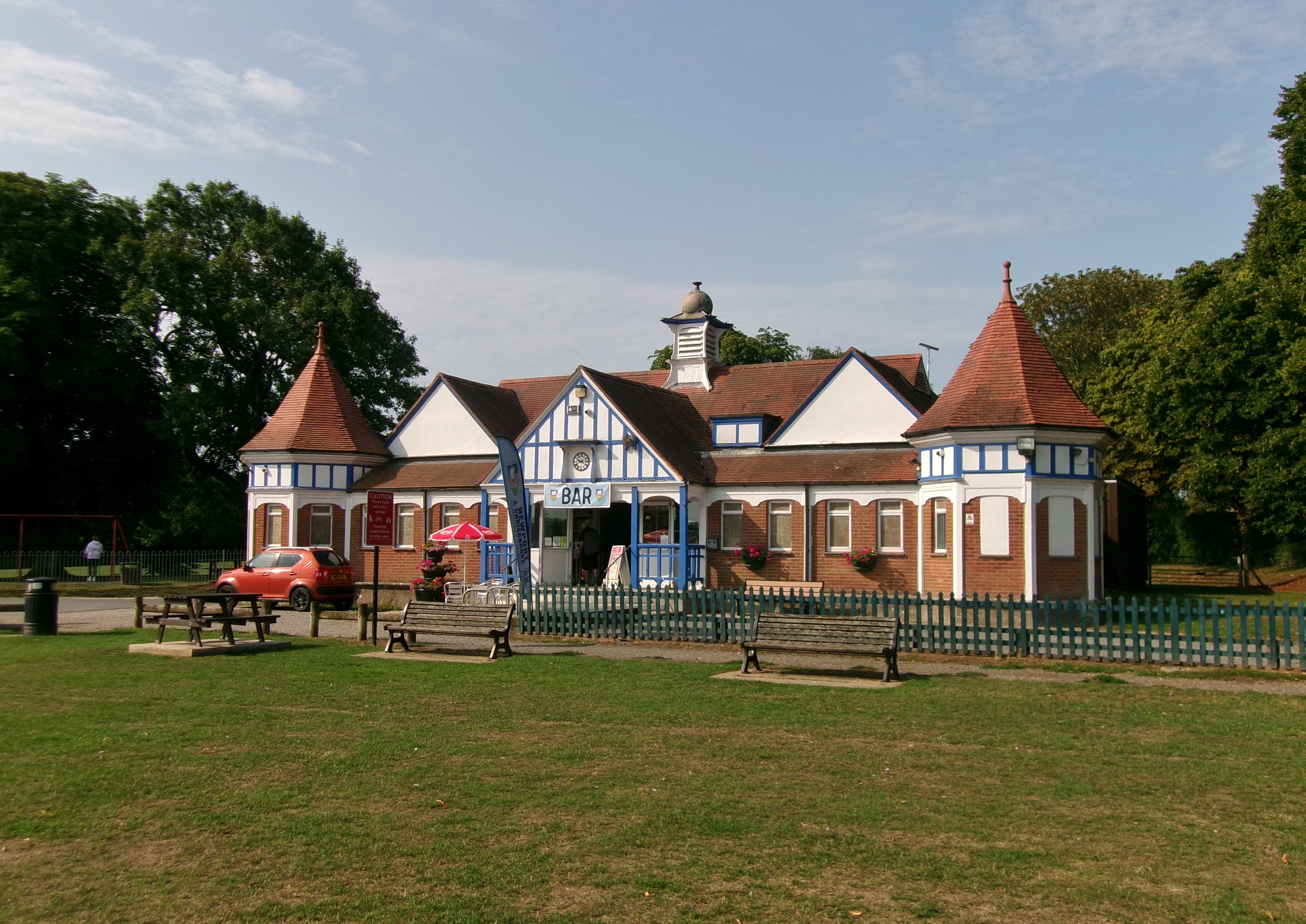
The pavilion

Victoria Recreation Ground is a park located on Recreation Ground Road, just off Carisbrooke Road, in Newport, on the Isle of Wight, England. It was opened in 1902.

The park comprises a cricket pitch, tennis courts, petanque terrain, pavilion and a sports hall. It operates as Newport Victoria Sports and Social Club, formed in 1983 by the amalgamation of the Newport Cricket Club, IW Hockey Club, Newport Victoria Sports Club (Lawn Tennis and Table Tennis) and the IW Ladies' Hockey Club. At that time, the Medina Borough Council gave a grant of £17,500 to upgrade the facilities at the recreation ground. This was received by Mr Roy Kinner, the chairman of the newly formed Newport Victoria Sports and Social Club, together with a grant of £2,000 from the National Sports Council. The money was used to improve and extend the pavilion and bring the ground and pavilion up to standard.

The pavilion was virtually doubled in size by connecting a large prefabricated extension. The newly formed club undertook to ensure that the ground was capable of holding hockey and netball festivals, County cricket matches and County table tennis matches. At the same time, the new club took out a 28-year lease on the pavilion from the Medina Borough Council.

In 2014, the ground was said to be in crisis and there were real fears of its closure. This was because the £4,000 annual grant from the Council was set to be axed and there was genuine concern that the ground would face insolvency without it. It was said that it could also mean that the pavilion would have to be pulled down and the recreation ground closed. However, the ground's future was secured when Newport Parish Council agreed to take over the lease and pledged £7,600 to the upkeep of the pavilion. The parish councillors also agreed to pursue £17,000 which was said to be owed to the ground by the Isle of Wight Council.

== Newport Victoria Sports Club ==
Part of the new club, the similarly named Newport Victoria Sports Club, which operated as the Newport Lawn Tennis Club was formed in 1910 and was originally based here at Victoria Recreation Ground. As well as tennis, the club also incorporated table tennis and hockey. However, in 1964, the club moved to playing tennis at the Priory Secondary Girls' School courts and were awaiting planning permission for new headquarters. The only explanation found for the move was that the fortunes of the club had "reached a low ebb", although as the awaited planning permission was next to Victoria Recreation Ground, it may imply that the pavilion's condition was deteriorating badly.

In 1966, their new premises were ready on an alternative site and they moved to Mount Pleasant Road, using an £80 ex-army hut as their headquarters. There were three adjacent grass tennis courts. In 1971, the club celebrated its Diamond Jubilee and eventually returned to its original home at Victoria Recreation Ground in 1983, after a 19-year absence, with the formation of the current Newport Victoria Sports and Social Club.

Following the move, the former site of the club at Mount Pleasant Road was quickly developed for housing.

== History ==
The land on which the park sits was donated by Tankerville Chamberlayne to commemorate Queen Victoria's Diamond Jubilee in 1897. The event is recorded on a metal plaque on the park gates. It was opened and dedicated to the public by Princess Henry of Battenberg, the then Governor of the Isle of Wight, in 1902. This is recorded on a second metal plaque on the park gates. The facilities include a cricket pavilion.

The land given was a field of Mr Chamberlayne's Priory Estate near to West Mill, which was said to be "very conveniently placed, being within ten minutes' walk of Newport Guildhall." The area covered nine acres and was said at that time to be worth around one thousand pounds. The land was at that time bounded on the north-west by the Freshwater, Yarmouth and Newport Railway; the intersection of the railway and an earlier field boundary accounts for the sharp "point" at the north end of the ground.

As well as giving the land, Tankerville Chamberlayne also offered help in planting and laying out the site, writing in his letter to the Mayor of Newport on 15 March 1897, "I could send you a cargo of shrubs or young trees if they are wanted". Control and ownership of the land was vested in the Newport Town Council, with the proviso "I desire to saddle the gift with no restrictions except that it be always a recreation ground for the people". At the time of the offer, there was a crop of wheat growing in the field.

Within a few months, the Corporation had raised subscriptions amounting to £717 15s 2d towards the recreation ground, £68 1s 6d towards a celebration fund, with £70 17s 8d left to the discretion of the committee. In addition to the ornamental layout of the ground, the plans included a cycle track, cricket pitch and a pavilion. However to realize all of these goals, the committee realized that it would need to raise more subscriptions, although it had no doubt that they would be forthcoming.

On 1 December 1897, the deed of conveyance was signed, permitting the ground's use for recreational purposes, power was given to the Corporation to close the ground for paying events, all money taken to be used for improving and maintaining the grounds and buildings thereon. The Council in return agreed to erect entrance gates and surround the land with suitable fencing and to make a roadway to the ground,

A further gift of two acres of land was given by Alderman Mr F T Mew to provide a place for children's amusements of all sorts, adding to the ground's size. The required Recreation Ground Road was built from West Mill on land purchased from a Mr Spickernell for £60. This also involved diverting Lukely Brook and building a bridge over it. The land was leveled and prepared, to enable the proposed cricket pitch and cycle track to be laid and paths and fences were constructed. The trees and shrubs supplied by Mr Chamberlayne and grass seeds were sowed, generously supplied free of charge by Messrs Toogood of Southampton.

Up until June 1900, the following had been expended, Purchase of land £107 4s 0d, Road and fencing costs £600 0s 0d, Wages, horse hire, smith's work and freight £1,288 7s 0d, Tools, plant, rollers and mowers £84 5s 2d and miscellaneous costs, bringing the total to £2,154 4s 9d. However, this still did not include the building of the pavilion and it was advised that an application should be made to the Local Government Board for the sanction to borrow the remaining money needed, to be repaid though the rates over a number of years. Due to further costs of around £2,000, the decision on whether to lay the concrete cycling track, at three laps to the mile, was delayed. It was thought that a grass track could be supplied in the meantime, equally good as that at Carisbrooke Castle.

Estimates of the future costs were as follows, Building of Caretaker's lodge £350, Fencing and paths £650, Pavilion £1,000, Drains and swings etc. for land given by Mr Mew £150, Fees £200, Cycle track £2000, the loan to be repaid over 30 years. The estimated annual expenses were put at, Loan repayment £196 12s 6d, Wages of man and lad £78 0s 0d, Keep of horse £40 0s 0d, Incidentals £50. Income was estimated at Members Subscriptions £105, Sale of refreshments £100, Profits from events on Bank Holidays and Coronation Day £160, Lets for cricket and football matches and carnivals £100. This gave an estimated annual profit of £100 and as it included loan repayments, it meant that the rates would not be burdened. Although, the Mayor thought that the public would vote for the recreation ground, even if a full penny rate per annum were needed.

In October 1900, the question was raised as to whether the recreation ground could be turned into allotments, as this would provide fine recreation for classes of people such as clerks and mechanics, who could on their half-holidays grow fruit and vegetables. This motion was quickly quashed on the basis that the agreement was that the land could be used for genuine recreation only. By 1902, Newport Cricket Club was playing at the ground, although the pavilion and some of the other works had not yet been finished. They were very relieved that they no longer had the annual anxiety of whether to dissolve the club, for lack of a ground to play on. It had also meant that in the last year they could form an Isle of Wight County Cricket Club, who would no doubt also play at the venue. It was also proposed that there might be a railway siding for visitors to the ground in future, which never happened.

Cycling was indeed brought to the Recreation Ground and on 26 June 1903 a meeting of the Isle of Wight Cycling and Amateur Athletic Clubs was held there. It brought over 3,000 spectators, including Mr and Mrs Tankerville Chamberlayne MP. As well as the events, there were trick-cycling performances, a bicycle polo match and a performance by the Volunteer Band. There were unfortunately a number of accidents on the grass cycle track and Chamberlayne hoped that this would spur everybody on to provide within a year, one of the finest cinder tracks in the country.

In 1906, a Sweetmeat Automatic Delivery Company LTD Automatic Weighing Machine was installed at the premises. At the same time, it was agreed that the St Paul's and Newport Band would be given permission to play at the ground every alternate Thursday evening and to collect money for the Nursing Fund. However, dancing was to be strictly prohibited, thought to be a very wise decision for many reasons, as it led to misconduct in the long run. Because of complaints of unruly conduct at the ground, it was agreed to appoint a Supervision Officer to keep order until at least September at a wage of not exceeding 10 shillings a week.

Though cricket had undoubtedly been played at the recreation ground prior to 1938, it was in this year that Hampshire came across from the mainland to play a first-class match against Northamptonshire in the County Championship, which Hampshire won by 7 wickets, thanks in large part to a century and six wickets from Stuart Boyes. Hampshire returned the following season to play a second first-class match against Middlesex, which Middlesex won by an innings and 25 runs, following scores of 97 by Jack Robertson and 118 by Bill Edrich. First-class cricket didn't return to the ground following World War II. Newport Cricket Club play on the ground today.

Certainly, up until at least 1940, there was a World War One tank at the ground. In a Council meeting at that time, it was asked whether it should be disposed of, so that the metal could be used in the national interest, for the Second World War effort.

== Records ==
=== First-class ===
- Highest team total: 261 by Middlesex v Hampshire, 1939
- Lowest team total: 93 by Hampshire, as above
- Highest individual innings: 118 by Bill Edrich for Middlesex, as above
- Best bowling in an innings: 6-23 by Jim Smith for Middlesex, as above
- Best bowling in a match: 7/95 by Reg Partridge, for Northamptonshire v Hampshire, 1938

== See also ==
- List of Hampshire County Cricket Club grounds
- List of cricket grounds in England and Wales
