= Newclose County Cricket Ground =

Cricket ground in Isle of Wight, England

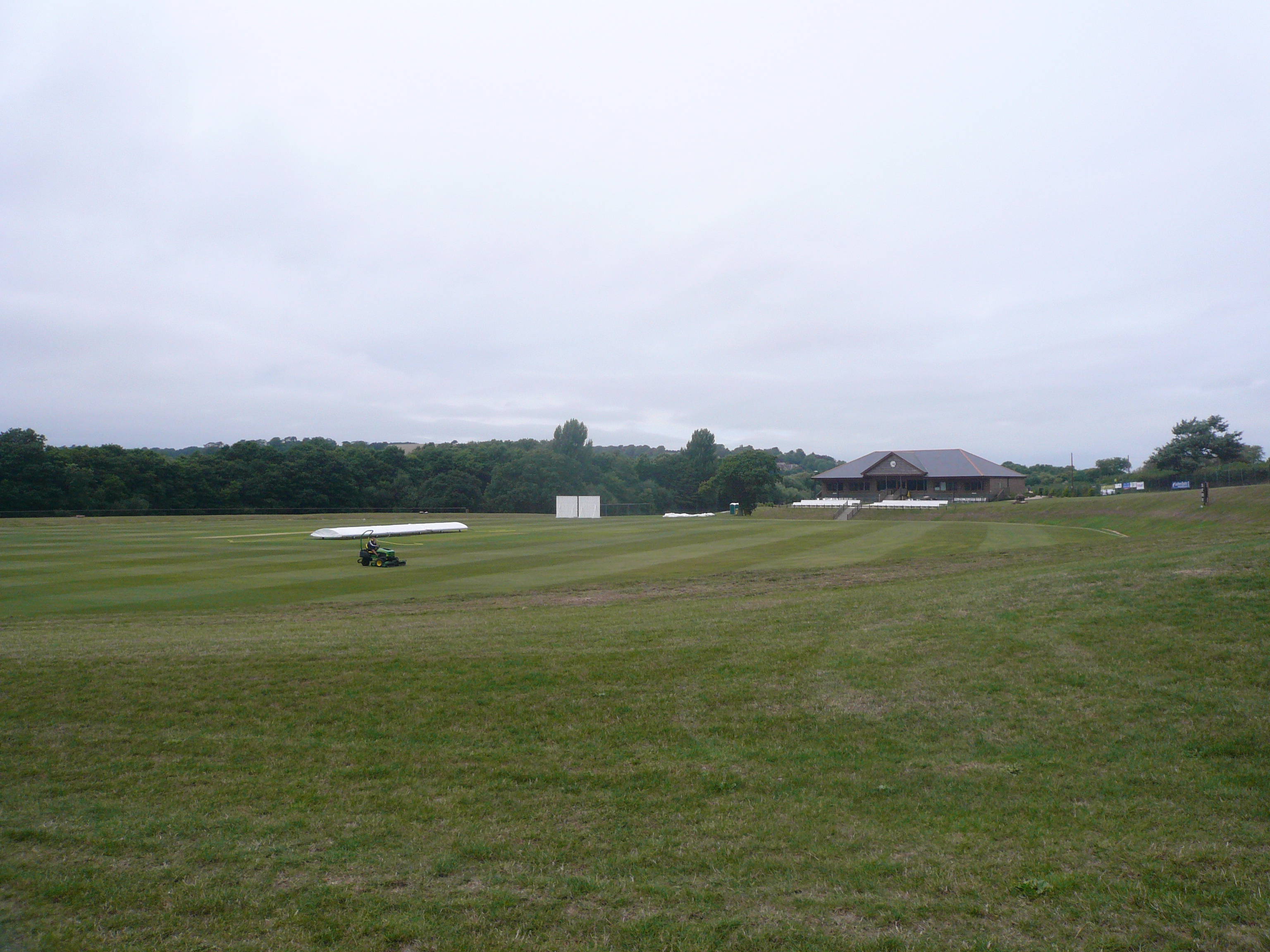
- Summer 2008
- Interactive map of Newclose County Cricket Ground

Ground information
- Location: Isle of Wight
- Coordinates: 50.6812°N 1.2875°W
- Establishment: 2008

Team information
Hampshire	(2019–2023)
- As of 2009; Source: IOW Cricket Board

Newclose County Cricket Ground is the county cricket ground for the Isle of Wight, located between Newport and Blackwater on the eastern bank of the River Medina.

As the county ground of the Isle of Wight Cricket Board, Newclose hosts county finals and minor counties matches, as well as Southern Vipers out-ground fixtures.

Newclose became a Hampshire out-ground in 2019, hosting a four-day fixture against Nottinghamshire. In 2022 and 2023, Hampshire hosted one-day fixtures against Northamptonshire and Kent at Newclose.

It was opened by Mike Gatting in 2009. The ground is also used as a conference and wedding venue.
