= Hampshire County Cricket Club in 2017 =

Hampshire County Cricket Club
2017 season
- Coach: (England) Craig White
- Captain: (Australia) George Bailey (First-class) (England) James Vince (Limited overs)
- Overseas player: (Australia) George Bailey (Pakistan) Shahid Afridi (T20 only)
- Ground(s): Rose Bowl, West End, Southampton

In 2017, Hampshire County Cricket Club will compete in Division One of the County Championship, the Royal London One-Day Cup and the NatWest t20 Blast.

== Squad ==
=== Departures ===
Left-arm medium bowler James Tomlinson and right-arm medium bowler Andy Carter both retired at the end of the 2016 season, although Carter later joined Northamptonshire. Wicket-keeper Adam Wheater left the club to join Essex in September 2016 after being released with a year left on his contract. South African all-rounder Ryan McLaren left Hampshire to join Lancashire in October 2016. In March 2017, former England U19 captain Joe Weatherley signed a new contract with Hampshire. As part of this deal, he agreed to move on loan for the 2017 season to Kent, although he was recalled in August due to a spate of injuries. Fast bowlers Gareth Andrew, Tino Best and Yasir Arafat (who had been on loan at Somerset in 2016) all were released after short-term deals, along with David Wainwright. Gavin Griffiths who had been on loan at the club, joined Leicestershire, while Craig Young did not have his loan extended either. Overseas player Darren Sammy will not be returning in 2017. In late August, Michael Carberry was loaned to Leicestershire for first-class cricket.

=== Arrivals ===
In September 2017, Hampshire signed young all-rounder Asher Hart from Durham's academy. In October 2016, young all-rounder Fraser Hay was awarded a summer contract for 2017, having impressed in the academy. In January 2017, South Africans Kyle Abbott and Rilee Rossouw both quit international cricket and subsequently signed for Hampshire on Kolpak contracts. George Bailey returned to the side on a two-year deal as overseas player, having previously played for the club as overseas in the 2013 season. Australian Ian Holland also joined the club during April, having played for the Second XI during the 2016 and early 2017 season. Youngsters Calvin Dickinson, Ben Duggan, Jake Goodwin and Josh McCoy all signed Hampshire scholarships with the side for the 2017 season after their performances for the academy and Second XI, while Felix Organ, on an academy contract, represented the first team in September. Former Essex bowler Matt Salisbury joined the club on trial following some impressive performances in the Second XI. Wiltshire spinner Jake Lintott joined the team in August while Mason Crane was on international duty.

=== Squad list ===
- No. denotes the player's squad number, as worn on the back of their shirt.
- ‡ denotes players with international caps.
- * denotes a player who has been awarded a county cap.

No.	Name	Nat	Birth date	Batting Style	Bowling Style	Notes
Batsmen
4	Jimmy Adams*	England	23 September 1980 (age 45)	Left-handed	Left-arm medium pace	
5	Joe Weatherley	England	19 January 1997 (age 29)	Right-handed	Right-arm off break	On loan at Kent (Apr—Aug)
9	Tom Alsop	England	27 November 1995 (age 30)	Left-handed	Slow left-arm orthodox	Occasional wicketkeeper
10	George Bailey ‡	Australia	7 September 1982 (age 44)	Right-handed	Right-arm medium pace	Overseas player, First-class captain
14	James Vince* ‡	England	14 March 1991 (age 35)	Right-handed	Right-arm medium pace	Club Captain
15	Michael Carberry* ‡	England	29 September 1980 (age 45)	Left-handed	Right-arm off break	Joined Leicestershire on loan in September 2017
30	Rilee Rossouw ‡	South Africa	9 October 1989 (age 36)	Left-handed	Right-arm off break	Kolpak player
All-rounders
00	Shahid Afridi ‡	Pakistan	1 March 1980 (age 46)	Right-handed	Right-arm leg break	Overseas player (T20 only)
2	Will Smith*	England	28 September 1982 (age 43)	Right-handed	Right-arm off break	
7	Sean Ervine* ‡	Zimbabwe	6 December 1982 (age 43)	Left-handed	Right-arm medium pace	Irish passport
8	Liam Dawson* ‡	England	1 March 1990 (age 36)	Right-handed	Slow left-arm orthodox	
13	Gareth Berg* ‡	Italy	18 January 1981 (age 45)	Right-handed	Right-arm fast-medium	
22	Ian Holland	Australia	3 October 1990 (age 35)	Right-handed	Right arm fast-medium	Joined April 2017
25	Chris Wood	England	27 June 1990 (age 36)	Right-handed	Left-arm fast-medium	
28	Asher Hart	England	30 March 1997 (age 29)	Right-handed	Right arm fast-medium	
87	Kyle Abbott ‡	South Africa	18 June 1987 (age 39)	Right-handed	Right-arm fast-medium	Kolpak player
—	Fraser Hay	Australia	9 July 1996 (age 30)	Right-handed	Right arm medium pace	UK Passport, Summer contract
—	Felix Organ	England	2 June 1999 (age 27)	Right-handed	Right-arm off break	Promoted from Academy September 2017
Wicket-keepers
18	Lewis McManus	England	9 October 1994 (age 31)	Right-handed	—	
21	Calvin Dickinson	England	3 November 1996 (age 29)	Right-handed	—	Hampshire scholarship, Promoted from Academy June 2017
Bowlers
6	Reece Topley ‡	England	12 February 1994 (age 32)	Right-handed	Left-arm fast-medium	
24	Matt Salisbury	England	18 April 1993 (age 33)	Right-handed	Right-arm fast-medium	Joined June 2017
32	Mason Crane ‡	England	18 February 1997 (age 29)	Right-handed	Right-arm leg break	
47	Ryan Stevenson	England	2 April 1992 (age 34)	Right-handed	Right-arm fast-medium	
58	Brad Wheal ‡	Scotland	28 August 1996 (age 30)	Right-handed	Right-arm fast-medium	
82	Fidel Edwards ‡	West Indies	6 February 1982 (age 44)	Right-handed	Right-arm fast	Kolpak player
93	Brad Taylor	England	14 March 1997 (age 29)	Right-handed	Right-arm off break	
—	Jake Lintott	England	22 April 1993 (age 33)	Right-handed	Slow left-arm orthodox	Joined August 2017

- Squad information correct as of 17 August 2017

== County Championship ==
Hampshire will play 14 County Championship Division One matches in 2017. The Championship has been restructured for 2017, with Division One having eight teams, leaving the remaining ten counties in Division Two instead of the previous nine-nine split. Teams in both divisions will play fewer matches than in 2016 (14 instead of 16), meaning that teams in Division One will play all of their rivals twice.

Hampshire's opening fixture was away against Yorkshire at Headingley Cricket Ground, which they won by 4 wickets after successfully chasing 320. They will then play seven home matches in total at the Rose Bowl. One fixture, a home game against Somerset, will be a day–night match, part of an experiment by the England and Wales Cricket Board ahead of the staging of the first UK day–night test match in August.

=== Division One ===
Team	Pld	W	L	D	Bat	Bowl	Ded	Pts
Essex (C)	14	10	0	4	28	40	0	248
Lancashire	14	5	3	6	29	37	0	176
Surrey	14	2	2	10	47	34	0	163
Yorkshire	14	4	5	5	24	35	0	148
Hampshire	14	3	3	8	24	36	0	148
Somerset	14	4	6	4	24	39	0	147
Middlesex (R)	14	3	4	7	28	37	2	146
Warwickshire (R)	14	1	9	4	19	31	0	86

Source: CricInfo

=== Matches ===
7–9 April 2017	Yorkshire (H)	v	Hampshire	Hampshire won by 4 wickets
Scorecard	273 (73.5 overs); GS Ballance 120 (190); FH Edwards 3/58 (14 overs)		187 (48.5 overs); LD McManus 41* (75); BO Coad 6/37 (17 overs)	Headingley Cricket Ground, Headingley, Leeds; Umpires: RA Kettleborough and SJ O'Shaughnessy
Scorecard	187 (55.3 overs); GS Ballance 55 (93); KJ Abbott 7/41 (14 overs)		321/6 (101 overs); JHK Adams 72 (161); TT Bresnan 3/73 (25 overs)	Headingley Cricket Ground, Headingley, Leeds; Umpires: RA Kettleborough and SJ O'Shaughnessy
No toss, Hampshire elected to field.; Points: Hampshire 19, Yorkshire 5.; Rilee Rossouw made his first class debut for Hampshire.

14–17 April 2017	Middlesex	v	Hampshire (H)	Match drawn
Scorecard	356 (113 overs); SD Robson 84 (144); BTJ Wheal 4/98 (23 overs)		438 (133.4 overs); RR Rossouw 99 (143); DJ Malan 2/19 (3.4 overs)	Rose Bowl, West End, Southampton; Umpires: RJ Bailey and JW Lloyds
Scorecard	278/9d (112 overs); AC Voges 92 (196); KJ Abbott 5/59 (25 overs)			Rose Bowl, West End, Southampton; Umpires: RJ Bailey and JW Lloyds
Middlesex won the toss and elected to bat.; Fidel Edwards and Gareth Berg (Hants) both played their 100th first-class match.; Points: Hampshire 10, Middlesex 10.

21–24 April 2017	Hampshire (H)	v	Yorkshire	Match drawn
Scorecard	455 (144.4 overs); JM Vince 147 (254); BO Coad 4/71 (30 overs)		231 (77.2 overs); GS Ballance 108 (198); GK Berg 4/62 (20 overs)	Rose Bowl, West End, Southampton; Umpires: BV Taylor and AG Wharf
Scorecard			399/6d (132 overs) (f/o); GS Ballance 203* (384); KJ Abbott 3/65 (28 overs)	Rose Bowl, West End, Southampton; Umpires: BV Taylor and AG Wharf
No toss, Yorkshire elected to field.; Points: Hampshire 11, Yorkshire 8.

19–22 May 2017	Essex (H)	v	Hampshire	Essex won by an innings and 97 runs
Scorecard	360 (132.4 overs); AN Cook 124 (281); KJ Abbott 5/58 (30 overs)		115 (37.3 overs); LD McManus 39 (74); JA Porter 5/24 (14 overs)	Essex County Ground, Chelmsford; Umpires: SA Garratt and RT Robinson
Scorecard			148 (47.3 overs) (f/o); LD McManus 37 (52); SR Harmer 3/23 (5 overs)	Essex County Ground, Chelmsford; Umpires: SA Garratt and RT Robinson
No toss, Hampshire elected to field.; 17 overs were lost on day one due to rain. 11 overs were then lost on day two due to rain.; Points: Essex 22, Hampshire 1.

26–29 May 2017	Hampshire	v	Somerset (H)	Hampshire won by 90 runs
Scorecard	162 (49.1 overs); KJ Abbott 49 (54); MJ Leach 6/78 (20.1 overs)		197 (57.3 overs); D Elgar 60 (91); KJ Abbott 4/49 (14 overs)	County Ground, Taunton; Umpires: NGB Cook and GD Lloyd
Scorecard	293 (67.3 overs); MA Carberry 51 (78); DM Bess 7/117 (23.3 overs)		168 (54.2 overs); D Elgar 60 (100); MS Crane 5/40 (13.2 overs)	County Ground, Taunton; Umpires: NGB Cook and GD Lloyd
Hampshire won the toss and elected to bat.; Points: Hampshire 19, Somerset 3.

2–5 June 2017	Hampshire (H)	v	Warwickshire	Hampshire won by an innings and 94 runs
Scorecard	515 (161.5 overs); SM Ervine 203 (363); Sukhjit Singh 6/144 (50 overs)		254 (102.1 overs); IJL Trott 101 (213); MS Crane 3/104 (36 overs)	Rose Bowl, West End, Southampton; Umpires: NGC Cowley and PJ Hartley
Scorecard			167 (64.4 overs); IR Bell 68 (76); KJ Abbott 4/32 (18 overs)	Rose Bowl, West End, Southampton; Umpires: NGC Cowley and PJ Hartley
Hampshire won the toss and elected to bat.; Ian Holland and Matt Salisbury made their first class debuts for Hampshire.; Points: Hampshire 22, Warwickshire 3.

19–22 June 2017	Hampshire	v	Lancashire (H)	Lancashire won by an innings and 30 runs
Scorecard	395 (114.1 overs); GJ Bailey 127 (187); LA Procter 2/49 (14 overs)		593 (146.2 overs); DJ Vilas 244 (275); GK Berg 4/111 (38 overs)	Old Trafford Cricket Ground, Old Trafford, Greater Manchester; Umpires: PK Baldwin and NA Mallender
Scorecard	168 (56.5 overs); GK Berg 49 (71); JM Anderson 4/20 (15 overs)			Old Trafford Cricket Ground, Old Trafford, Greater Manchester; Umpires: PK Baldwin and NA Mallender
Hampshire won the toss and elected to bat.; George Bailey scored his maiden first-class century for Hampshire.; Points: Lancashire 24, Hampshire 5.

26–29 June 2017 (D/N)	Hampshire (H)	v	Somerset	Match drawn
Scorecard	211/9d (88 overs); LA Dawson 53 (139); L Gregory 3/51 (17 overs)		147 (52.2 overs); AJ Hose 48 (98); IG Holland 4/16 (6 overs)	Rose Bowl, West End, Southampton; Umpires: ID Blackwell and MJ Saggers
Scorecard	96/5d (39 overs); RR Rossouw 22 (37); L Gregory 2/34 (10 overs)		88/8 (31 overs); SM Davies 47 (40); GK Berg 3/17 (9 overs)	Rose Bowl, West End, Southampton; Umpires: ID Blackwell and MJ Saggers
Hampshire won the toss and elected to bat.; Only 13 overs were possible on day 2 due to rain. Only 27.1 overs were then possible on day 3 due to rain. A further 19 overs were lost on day 4 due to rain.; Eddie Byrom (Somerset) made his first-class debut.; Points: Hampshire 9, Somerset 8.

3–6 July 2017	Hampshire	v	Surrey (H)	Match drawn
Scorecard	648/7d (161.4 overs); GJ Bailey 161 (294); TK Curran 2/85 (25 overs)		483 (147.5 overs); RJ Burns 219* (423); IG Holland 3/37 (16.5 overs)	The Oval, Kennington, London; Umpires: NGB Cook and AG Wharf
Scorecard			166/3d (52 overs) (f/o); RJ Burns 68 (112); IG Holland 2/16 (7 overs)	The Oval, Kennington, London; Umpires: NGB Cook and AG Wharf
Hampshire won the toss and elected to bat.; Points: Hampshire 12, Surrey 10.

6–9 August 2017	Lancashire	v	Hampshire (H)	Match drawn
	149 (57.5 overs); AL Davies 36 (73); MS Crane 3/27 (5.5 overs)		224 (57.4 overs); LA Dawson 75 (98); KJ Jarvis 6/61 (18 overs)	Rose Bowl, West End, Southampton; Umpires: SC Gale and JW Lloyds
	314/5 (76 overs); AL Davies 97 (92); LA Dawson 2/62 (22 overs)			Rose Bowl, West End, Southampton; Umpires: SC Gale and JW Lloyds
Lancashire won the toss and elected to bat.; No play possible on days 3 and 4 due to rain.; Points: Hampshire 9, Lancashire 8.

5–8 September 2017	Surrey	v	Hampshire (H)	Match drawn
	200 (65.4 overs); R Patel 81 (163); LA Dawson 4/22 (15.4 overs)		290 (88.5 overs); GK Berg 80 (116); TK Curran 4/69 (19.5 overs)	Rose Bowl, West End, Southampton; Umpires: M Burns and DJ Millns
	280/4 (88.5 overs); OJ Pope 100* (137); LA Dawson 2/35 (27 overs)			Rose Bowl, West End, Southampton; Umpires: M Burns and DJ Millns
Hampshire won the toss and elected to field; Points: Hampshire 10, Surrey 9.

12–15 September 2017	Middlesex (H)	v	Hampshire	Match drawn
	204 (72 overs); JA Simpson 36 (67); FH Edwards 5/79 (26 overs)		146 (36.1 overs); JJ Weatherley 35 (38); ST Finn 3/41 (10.1 overs)	Uxbridge Cricket Club Ground, Uxbridge, London; Umpires: RJ Evans and GD Lloyd
	14/1 (9 overs); NRD Compton 11* (28); GK Berg 1/9 (5 overs)			Uxbridge Cricket Club Ground, Uxbridge, London; Umpires: RJ Evans and GD Lloyd
No toss, Hampshire elected to field first.; No play on day one due to a wet outfield.; Only 31.1 overs possible on day two due to rain.; Only 28.5 overs possible on day three due to rain.; Only 58.1 overs possible on day four due to rain.; Felix Organ (Hampshire) made his first class debut.; Points: Middlesex 9, Hampshire 8.

19–22 September 2017	Hampshire (H)	v	Essex	Essex won by 108 runs
	254 (67.5 overs); GJ Bailey 89 (130); JA Porter 4/53 (17 overs)		76 (35.2 overs); RN ten Doeschate 26 (36); KJ Abbott 6/20 (11 overs)	Rose Bowl, West End, Southampton; Umpires: NJ Llong and AG Wharf
	76 (29.4 overs); IG Holland 16* (46); SJ Cook 5/18 (11.4 overs)		362 (123 overs) (f/o); DW Lawrence 101 (209); FH Edwards 3/73 (26 overs)	Rose Bowl, West End, Southampton; Umpires: NJ Llong and AG Wharf
No toss, Essex elected to field first.; Points: Essex 19, Hampshire 5.

25–28 September 2017	Warwickshire (H)	v	Hampshire	Match drawn
	188 (61 overs); DP Sibley 92* (168); FH Edwards 5/49 (14 overs)		116 (34.2 overs); GJ Bailey 55 (57); OJ Hannon-Dalby 4/29 (12 overs)	Edgbaston Cricket Ground, Edgbaston, Birmingham; Umpires: JH Evans and R Warren
	186 (49.5 overs); IR Bell 77* (101); GK Berg 3/40 (9 overs)		195/7 (87.4 overs); GK Berg 34 (66); RN Sidebottom 3/55 (19 overs)	Edgbaston Cricket Ground, Edgbaston, Birmingham; Umpires: JH Evans and R Warren
No toss, Hampshire elected to field first.; No play on Day 1 due to rain.; Points: Hampshire 8, Warwickshire 8.; As a result of Hampshire's draw they remain in Division One, while Middlesex are relegated to Division Two.

== Other first-class matches ==
Hampshire began the 2017 English cricket season with a three-day University match against Cardiff MCC University on 2 April. They will also play South Africa A in a day night match on 8 June.

2–4 April 2017	Hampshire (H)	v	Cardiff MCCU	Match drawn
Scorecard	289 (63.3 overs); MA Carberry 100 (121); N Brand 3/7 (4.3 overs)		98 (36.3 overs); KS Leverock 21 (28); AHJA Hart 3/17 (6.3 overs)	Rose Bowl, West End, Southampton; Umpires: ID Blackwell and BV Taylor
Scorecard	271/6d (66 overs); JM Vince 90 (114); N Brand 1/2 (3 overs)		110/2 (56 overs); N Brand 44* (102); SM Ervine 1/10 (9 overs)	Rose Bowl, West End, Southampton; Umpires: ID Blackwell and BV Taylor
Cardiff MCCU won the toss and elected to field.; David O'Sullivan (Cardiff MCCU) and Asher Hart (Hampshire) made their first class debuts.

8–11 June 2017 (D/N)	South Africa A	v	Hampshire (H)	South Africa A won by 251 runs
	370/7d (104.1 overs); HG Kuhn 200* (291); MET Salisbury 3/65 (19.1 overs)		185 (51.4 overs); CM Dickinson 99 (102); D Paterson 7/27 (13.4 overs)	Rose Bowl, West End, Southampton; Umpires: RJ Evans and SG Gale
	185/1d (51 overs); AK Markram 102* (150); MET Salisbury 1/29 (9 overs)		119 (45.5 overs); TP Alsop 51 (115); BE Hendricks 5/20 (13.5 overs)	Rose Bowl, West End, Southampton; Umpires: RJ Evans and SG Gale
Hampshire won the toss and elected to field.; Calvin Dickinson made his first-class debut for Hampshire.

== Royal London One-Day Cup ==
Hampshire will play in the South group of the 2017 Royal London One-Day Cup. They will play each of the other eight teams in the group once.

=== South Group ===
Pos	Team	Pld	W	L	T	NR	Ded	Pts	NRR
1	Essex (Note: advanced directly to the semi-finals)	8	7	1	0	0	0	14	0.882
2	Somerset (Note: advanced to the quarter-finals)	8	5	2	0	1	0	11	0.543
3	Surrey	8	4	3	0	1	0	9	0.101
4	Glamorgan	8	4	4	0	0	0	8	−0.660
5	Sussex	8	3	3	0	2	0	8	0.535
6	Hampshire	8	3	4	0	1	0	7	−0.109
7	Gloucestershire	8	3	4	0	1	0	7	−0.435
8	Middlesex	8	2	4	0	2	0	6	−0.243
9	Kent	8	1	7	0	0	0	2	−0.409

Source: BBC Sport

=== Matches ===
27 April 2017	Kent (H); 258 (49.4 overs)	v	Hampshire; 260/4 (45.1 overs)	Hampshire won by 6 wickets
11:00 BST; Scorecard	Kent (H); 258 (49.4 overs)	v	Hampshire; 260/4 (45.1 overs)	St Lawrence Ground, Canterbury; Umpires: PR Pollard and MJ Saggers
11:00 BST; Scorecard	DI Stevens 60 (57); RJW Topley 3/65 (9.4 overs)		TP Alsop 112* (132); ME Claydon 2/51 (8 overs)	St Lawrence Ground, Canterbury; Umpires: PR Pollard and MJ Saggers
Hampshire won the toss and elected to field.; Ian Holland (Hampshire) made his List A debut.; Reece Topley made his List A debut for Hampshire.; Points: Hampshire 2, Kent 0.				St Lawrence Ground, Canterbury; Umpires: PR Pollard and MJ Saggers

30 April 2017	Essex (H); 304/7 (50 overs)	v	Hampshire; 279 (48.2 overs)	Essex won by 25 runs
11:00 BST; Scorecard	Essex (H); 304/7 (50 overs)	v	Hampshire; 279 (48.2 overs)	Essex County Ground, Chelmsford; Umpires: RJ Bailey and BJ Debenham
11:00 BST; Scorecard	T Westley 93 (98); LA Dawson 2/40 (10 overs)		JM Vince 68 (74); N Wagner 4/41 (9.2 overs)	Essex County Ground, Chelmsford; Umpires: RJ Bailey and BJ Debenham
Hampshire won the toss and elected to field.; George Bailey (Hampshire) played his 250th List A match.; Kyle Abbott made his List A debut for Hampshire.; Points: Essex 2, Hampshire 0.				Essex County Ground, Chelmsford; Umpires: RJ Bailey and BJ Debenham

3 May 2017	Middlesex; 295 (50 overs)	v	Hampshire (H); 146/7 (30.3 overs)	Middlesex won by 89 runs (D/L/S)
14:00 BST (D/N); Scorecard	Middlesex; 295 (50 overs)	v	Hampshire (H); 146/7 (30.3 overs)	Rose Bowl, West End, Southampton; Umpires: JH Evans and AG Wharf; Player of the match: TS Roland-Jones (Middlesex)
14:00 BST (D/N); Scorecard	NRT Gubbins 114 (117); RJW Topley 4/68 (10 overs)		GJ Bailey 52* (67); TS Roland-Jones 4/10 (7 overs)	Rose Bowl, West End, Southampton; Umpires: JH Evans and AG Wharf; Player of the match: TS Roland-Jones (Middlesex)
Hampshire won the toss and elected to field.; Rain stopped play during Hampshire's innings, from which play never restarted. The target was revised to 236.; James Fuller (Middlesex) played his 50th List A match.; Points: Middlesex 2, Hampshire 0.				Rose Bowl, West End, Southampton; Umpires: JH Evans and AG Wharf; Player of the match: TS Roland-Jones (Middlesex)

7 May 2017	Gloucestershire; 237 (49.2 overs)	v	Hampshire (H); 239/3 (42.3 overs)	Hampshire won by 7 wickets
11:00 BST; Scorecard	Gloucestershire; 237 (49.2 overs)	v	Hampshire (H); 239/3 (42.3 overs)	Rose Bowl, West End, Southampton; Umpires: SA Garratt and AG Wharf
11:00 BST; Scorecard	JMR Taylor 63 (62); LA Dawson 3/30 (10 overs)		JM Vince 89* (81); CJ Liddle 1/18 (3 overs)	Rose Bowl, West End, Southampton; Umpires: SA Garratt and AG Wharf
Gloucestershire won the toss and elected to bat.; Points: Hampshire 2, Gloucestershire 0.				Rose Bowl, West End, Southampton; Umpires: SA Garratt and AG Wharf

10 May 2017	Somerset (H); 249 (44.2 overs)	v	Hampshire; 250/6 (37.2 overs)	Hampshire won by 4 wickets
11:00 BST; Scorecard	Somerset (H); 249 (44.2 overs)	v	Hampshire; 250/6 (37.2 overs)	County Ground, Taunton; Umpires: NGC Cowley and JH Evans
11:00 BST; Scorecard	D Elgar 78 (88); GK Berg 3/44 (8 overs)		RR Rossouw 156 (113); J Overton 4/64 (9 overs)	County Ground, Taunton; Umpires: NGC Cowley and JH Evans
Hampshire won the toss and elected to field.; Rilee Rossouw made his List A debut for Hampshire.; Points: Hampshire 2, Somerset 0.				County Ground, Taunton; Umpires: NGC Cowley and JH Evans

12 May 2017	Hampshire (H); 332/6 (49 overs)	v	Glamorgan; 334/7 (48.5 overs)	Glamorgan won by 3 wickets
11:00 BST; Scorecard	Hampshire (H); 332/6 (49 overs)	v	Glamorgan; 334/7 (48.5 overs)	Rose Bowl, West End, Southampton; Umpires: SC Gale and MJ Saggers
11:00 BST; Scorecard	JM Vince 178 (138); M de Lange 5/49 (9 overs)		CA Ingram 115 (78); MS Crane 3/69 (10 overs)	Rose Bowl, West End, Southampton; Umpires: SC Gale and MJ Saggers
Glamorgan won the toss and elected to field.; Rain delays reduced the match to 49 overs per side.; Liam Dawson (Hampshire) passed 3,000 List A runs.; James Vince's 178 was the highest List A score by a Hampshire batsman.; James Vince and Liam Dawson's partnership of 221 runs for the 4th wicket was a new Hampshire List A record.; Colin Ingram (Glamorgan) passed 7,000 List A runs.; Points: Glamorgan 2, Hampshire 0.				Rose Bowl, West End, Southampton; Umpires: SC Gale and MJ Saggers

14 May 2017	Hampshire; 271/8 (50 overs)	v	Surrey (H); 238/2 (38 overs)	Surrey won by 66 runs (D/L/S)
11:00 BST; Scorecard	Hampshire; 271/8 (50 overs)	v	Surrey (H); 238/2 (38 overs)	The Oval, Kennington, London; Umpires: NL Bainton and GD Lloyd
11:00 BST; Scorecard	GJ Bailey 145* (132); R Rampaul 4/61 (10 overs)		KC Sangakkara 124* (121); KJ Abbott 1/34 (7 overs)	The Oval, Kennington, London; Umpires: NL Bainton and GD Lloyd
Hampshire won the toss and elected to bat.; Rain delays reduced Surrey's innings to 38 overs.; Ravi Rampaul (Surrey) took his 250th List A wicket.; George Bailey and Kyle Abbott's partnership of 152 runs for the 8th wicket was a new Hampshire List A record.; Points: Surrey 2, Hampshire 0				The Oval, Kennington, London; Umpires: NL Bainton and GD Lloyd

17 May 2017	Hampshire (H)	v	Sussex	Match abandoned
14:00 BST (D/N); Scorecard	Hampshire (H)	v	Sussex	Rose Bowl, West End, Southampton; Umpires: M Burns and GD Lloyd
No toss.; No play was possible due to rain.; Points: Hampshire 1, Sussex 1.				Rose Bowl, West End, Southampton; Umpires: M Burns and GD Lloyd

== NatWest t20 Blast ==
Hampshire will play in the South group of the 2017 NatWest t20 Blast. The county will play 14 matches, playing each team in the group at least once.

=== South Group ===
Pos	Team	Pld	W	L	T	NR	Ded	Pts	NRR
1	Glamorgan	14	7	3	0	4	0	18	0.045
2	Surrey	14	7	5	0	2	0	16	−0.130
3	Hampshire	14	7	6	0	1	0	15	−0.021
4	Somerset	14	6	6	0	2	0	14	0.491
5	Sussex Sharks	14	5	5	1	3	0	14	0.423
6	Kent Spitfires	14	6	7	1	0	0	13	−0.158
7	Middlesex	14	5	7	1	1	0	12	0.221
8	Essex Eagles	14	5	7	0	2	0	12	−0.204
9	Gloucestershire	14	4	6	1	3	0	12	−0.648

Source: BBC Sport

=== Matches ===
7 July 2017	Hampshire; 167/5 (20 overs)	v	Glamorgan (H); 145/9 (20 overs)	Hampshire won by 22 runs
(D/N)	Hampshire; 167/5 (20 overs)	v	Glamorgan (H); 145/9 (20 overs)	Sophia Gardens, Cardiff; Umpires: RJ Evans and T Lungley; Player of the match: Lewis McManus (Hampshire)
(D/N)	LD McManus 59* (35); MG Hogan 2/25 (4 overs)		GG Wagg 50 (28); Shahid Afridi 4/20 (4 overs)	Sophia Gardens, Cardiff; Umpires: RJ Evans and T Lungley; Player of the match: Lewis McManus (Hampshire)
Glamorgan won the toss and elected to field.; Kiran Carlson (Glamorgan) made his Twenty20 debut.; Rilee Rossouw, George Bailey and Reece Topley made their Twenty20 debuts for Hampshire.; Points: Hampshire 2, Glamorgan 0.				Sophia Gardens, Cardiff; Umpires: RJ Evans and T Lungley; Player of the match: Lewis McManus (Hampshire)

12 July 2017	Hampshire; 188/3 (20 overs)	v	Sussex (H); 169/7 (20 overs)	Hampshire won by 19 runs
(D/N)	Hampshire; 188/3 (20 overs)	v	Sussex (H); 169/7 (20 overs)	County Cricket Ground, Hove, Brighton and Hove; Umpires: JW Lloyds and NA Mallender; Player of the match: Kyle Abbott (Hampshire)
(D/N)	JM Vince 81 (48); WAT Beer 1/27 (3 overs)		LJ Wright 50 (33); KJ Abbott 3/22 (4 overs)	County Cricket Ground, Hove, Brighton and Hove; Umpires: JW Lloyds and NA Mallender; Player of the match: Kyle Abbott (Hampshire)
Sussex won the toss and elected to field.; Points: Hampshire 2, Sussex 0.				County Cricket Ground, Hove, Brighton and Hove; Umpires: JW Lloyds and NA Mallender; Player of the match: Kyle Abbott (Hampshire)

14 July 2017	Hampshire (H); 189/8 (20 overs)	v	Middlesex; 160/7 (20 overs)	Hampshire won by 29 runs
(D/N)	Hampshire (H); 189/8 (20 overs)	v	Middlesex; 160/7 (20 overs)	Rose Bowl, West End, Southampton; Umpires: PK Baldwin and NGC Cowley; Player of the match: Michael Carberry (Hampshire)
(D/N)	MA Carberry 77 (45); TS Roland-Jones 4/39 (4 overs)		TG Southee 64* (32); MS Crane 3/15 (4 overs)	Rose Bowl, West End, Southampton; Umpires: PK Baldwin and NGC Cowley; Player of the match: Michael Carberry (Hampshire)
Hampshire won the toss and elected to bat.; Points: Hampshire 2, Middlesex 0.				Rose Bowl, West End, Southampton; Umpires: PK Baldwin and NGC Cowley; Player of the match: Michael Carberry (Hampshire)

20 July 2017	Hampshire (H); 126/9 (20 overs)	v	Sussex; 127/4 (17.2 overs)	Sussex won by 6 wickets
(D/N)	Hampshire (H); 126/9 (20 overs)	v	Sussex; 127/4 (17.2 overs)	Rose Bowl, West End, Southampton; Umpires: PK Baldwin and MA Gough; Player of the match: Jofra Archer (Sussex)
(D/N)	TP Alsop 64 (50); JC Archer 4/18 (4 overs)		BC Brown 42 (35); MS Crane 1/19 (4 overs)	Rose Bowl, West End, Southampton; Umpires: PK Baldwin and MA Gough; Player of the match: Jofra Archer (Sussex)
Hampshire won the toss and elected to bat.; Points: Sussex 2, Hampshire 0.				Rose Bowl, West End, Southampton; Umpires: PK Baldwin and MA Gough; Player of the match: Jofra Archer (Sussex)

21 July 2017	Hampshire; 124/9 (20 overs)	v	Essex (H); 129/3 (14 overs)	Essex won by 7 wickets
(D/N)	Hampshire; 124/9 (20 overs)	v	Essex (H); 129/3 (14 overs)	Essex County Ground, Chelmsford; Umpires: M Burns and DJ Millns; Player of the match: Ravi Bopara (Essex)
(D/N)	MA Carberry 30 (25); RS Bopara 4/19 (4 overs)		AJ Wheater 44* (32); Shahid Afridi 1/25 (3 overs)	Essex County Ground, Chelmsford; Umpires: M Burns and DJ Millns; Player of the match: Ravi Bopara (Essex)
Essex won the toss and elected to field.; Points: Essex 2, Hampshire 0.				Essex County Ground, Chelmsford; Umpires: M Burns and DJ Millns; Player of the match: Ravi Bopara (Essex)

23 July 2017	Hampshire (H)	v	Surrey	Match abandoned without a ball bowled
(D/N)	Hampshire (H)	v	Surrey	Rose Bowl, West End, Southampton; Umpires: RJ Bailey and M Burns
Points: Hampshire 1, Surrey 1.				Rose Bowl, West End, Southampton; Umpires: RJ Bailey and M Burns

26 July 2017	Somerset (H); 204/9 (20 overs)	v	Hampshire; 190 (19.3 overs)	Somerset won by 14 runs
(D/N)	Somerset (H); 204/9 (20 overs)	v	Hampshire; 190 (19.3 overs)	County Ground, Taunton; Umpires: PK Baldwin and BV Taylor; Player of the match: Lewis Gregory (Somerset)
(D/N)	L Gregory 43 (20); GK Berg 3/35 (4 overs)		LD McManus 34 (18); TD Groenewald 2/28 (4 overs)	County Ground, Taunton; Umpires: PK Baldwin and BV Taylor; Player of the match: Lewis Gregory (Somerset)
Somerset won the toss and elected to bat.; Points: Somerset 2, Hampshire 0.				County Ground, Taunton; Umpires: PK Baldwin and BV Taylor; Player of the match: Lewis Gregory (Somerset)

28 July 2017	Gloucestershire (H); 174/5 (19 overs)	v	Hampshire; 121/3 (11.4 overs)	Hampshire won by 24 runs (D/L/S method)
(D/N)	Gloucestershire (H); 174/5 (19 overs)	v	Hampshire; 121/3 (11.4 overs)	Bristol County Ground, Ashley Down, Bristol; Umpires: NGC Cowley and BV Taylor; Player of the match: Michael Klinger (Gloucestershire)
(D/N)	M Klinger 101* (58); MS Crane 2/17 (3 overs)		RR Rossouw 45* (27); MD Taylor 2/29 (4 overs)	Bristol County Ground, Ashley Down, Bristol; Umpires: NGC Cowley and BV Taylor; Player of the match: Michael Klinger (Gloucestershire)
Hampshire won the toss and elected to field.; Rain lead to both innings being shortened to 19 overs per side.; Rain stopped play after 11.4 overs of Hampshire's innings.; Points: Hampshire 2, Gloucestershire 0.				Bristol County Ground, Ashley Down, Bristol; Umpires: NGC Cowley and BV Taylor; Player of the match: Michael Klinger (Gloucestershire)

1 August 2017	Kent; 159/6 (20 overs)	v	Hampshire (H); 154/4 (20 overs)	Kent won by 5 runs
(D/N)	Kent; 159/6 (20 overs)	v	Hampshire (H); 154/4 (20 overs)	Rose Bowl, West End Southampton; Umpires: SJ O'Shaughnessy and BV Taylor; Player of the match: Daniel Bell-Drummond (Kent)
(D/N)	DJ Bell-Drummond 62 (42); Shahid Afridi 4/26 (4 overs)		TP Alsop 43* (41); JDS Neesham 1/22 (3 overs)	Rose Bowl, West End Southampton; Umpires: SJ O'Shaughnessy and BV Taylor; Player of the match: Daniel Bell-Drummond (Kent)
Kent won the toss and elected to bat.; Points: Kent 2, Hampshire 0.				Rose Bowl, West End Southampton; Umpires: SJ O'Shaughnessy and BV Taylor; Player of the match: Daniel Bell-Drummond (Kent)

3 August 2017	Middlesex (H); 136 (19.1 overs)	v	Hampshire; 137/4 (17.3 overs)	Hampshire won by 6 wickets
(D/N)	Middlesex (H); 136 (19.1 overs)	v	Hampshire; 137/4 (17.3 overs)	Lord's, St John's Wood, London; Umpires: NL Bainton and MA Gough; Player of the match: Rilee Rossouw (Hampshire)
(D/N)	SS Eskinazi 43 (27); KJ Abbott 3/26 (4 overs)		RR Rossouw 60 (47); TG Helm 1/30 (4 overs)	Lord's, St John's Wood, London; Umpires: NL Bainton and MA Gough; Player of the match: Rilee Rossouw (Hampshire)
Middlesex won the toss and elected to bat.; Tom Barber (Middlesex) and Ian Holland (Hampshire) made their Twenty20 debuts.; Points: Hampshire 2, Middlesex 0.				Lord's, St John's Wood, London; Umpires: NL Bainton and MA Gough; Player of the match: Rilee Rossouw (Hampshire)

4 August 2017	Hampshire (H); 168/6 (20 overs)	v	Essex; 169/6 (19.4 overs)	Essex won by 4 wickets
(D/N)	Hampshire (H); 168/6 (20 overs)	v	Essex; 169/6 (19.4 overs)	Rose Bowl, West End, Southampton; Umpires: RJ Evans and SC Gale; Player of the match: Adam Wheater (Essex)
(D/N)	GJ Bailey 89* (62); Ashar Zaidi 2/24 (4 overs)		AJ Wheater 50 (26); LA Dawson 3/41 (4 overs)	Rose Bowl, West End, Southampton; Umpires: RJ Evans and SC Gale; Player of the match: Adam Wheater (Essex)
Essex won the toss and elected to field.; Points: Essex 2, Hampshire 0.				Rose Bowl, West End, Southampton; Umpires: RJ Evans and SC Gale; Player of the match: Adam Wheater (Essex)

10 August 2017	Glamorgan; 118/6 (20 overs)	v	Hampshire (H); 119/2 (13.5 overs)	Hampshire won by 8 wickets
(D/N)	Glamorgan; 118/6 (20 overs)	v	Hampshire (H); 119/2 (13.5 overs)	Rose Bowl, West End, Southampton; Umpires: JW Lloyds and DJ Millns; Player of the match: Mason Crane (Hampshire)
(D/N)	AG Salter 37* (27); MS Crane 3/21 (4 overs)		JM Vince 60* (41); CA Ingram 2/29 (4 overs)	Rose Bowl, West End, Southampton; Umpires: JW Lloyds and DJ Millns; Player of the match: Mason Crane (Hampshire)
Glamorgan won the toss and elected to bat.; Calvin Dickinson (Hampshire) made his Twenty20 debut.; Points: Hampshire 2, Glamorgan 0.				Rose Bowl, West End, Southampton; Umpires: JW Lloyds and DJ Millns; Player of the match: Mason Crane (Hampshire)

11 August 2017	Kent (H); 167/7 (20 overs)	v	Hampshire; 171/4 (17.2 overs)	Hampshire won by 6 wickets
(D/N)	Kent (H); 167/7 (20 overs)	v	Hampshire; 171/4 (17.2 overs)	St Lawrence Ground, Canterbury; Umpires: PK Baldwin and RT Robinson; Player of the match: Calvin Dickinson (Hampshire)
(D/N)	SA Northeast 59 (42); LA Dawson 2/25 (4 overs); KJ Abbott 2/25 (4 overs)		JM Vince 57 (36); ME Claydon 2/33 (3 overs)	St Lawrence Ground, Canterbury; Umpires: PK Baldwin and RT Robinson; Player of the match: Calvin Dickinson (Hampshire)
Hampshire won the toss and elected to field.; Points: Hampshire 2, Kent 0.				St Lawrence Ground, Canterbury; Umpires: PK Baldwin and RT Robinson; Player of the match: Calvin Dickinson (Hampshire)

18 August 2017	Somerset; 189/3 (20 overs)	v	Hampshire (H); 91 (18.1 overs)	Somerset won by 98 runs
(D/N)	Somerset; 189/3 (20 overs)	v	Hampshire (H); 91 (18.1 overs)	Rose Bowl, West End, Southampton; Umpires: JW Lloyds and RJ Warren; Player of the match: Peter Trego (Somerset)
(D/N)	PD Trego 84* (50); JB Lintott 1/24 (3 overs)		TP Alsop 36 (29); RE van der Merwe 3/13 (4 overs)	Rose Bowl, West End, Southampton; Umpires: JW Lloyds and RJ Warren; Player of the match: Peter Trego (Somerset)
Somerset won the toss and elected to bat.; Jake Lintott (Hampshire) made his Twenty20 debut.; Points: Somerset 2, Hampshire 0.				Rose Bowl, West End, Southampton; Umpires: JW Lloyds and RJ Warren; Player of the match: Peter Trego (Somerset)

=== Quarter-final ===
As a result of Hampshire finishing in the top 4 of the South Group, they qualified for the quarter-finals. They will play Derbyshire on 22 August with the winner qualifying for Finals Day.

22 August 2017	Hampshire; 249/8 (20 overs)	v	Derbyshire (H); 148 (19.5 overs)	Hampshire won by 101 runs
(D/N)	Hampshire; 249/8 (20 overs)	v	Derbyshire (H); 148 (19.5 overs)	County Ground, Derby; Umpires: M Gough and AG Wharf; Player of the match: Shahid Afridi (Hampshire)
(D/N)	Shahid Afridi 101 (43); MJJ Critchley 3/32 (3 overs)		BD Cotton 30* (21); KJ Abbott 3/25 (3.5 overs)	County Ground, Derby; Umpires: M Gough and AG Wharf; Player of the match: Shahid Afridi (Hampshire)
Derbyshire won the toss and elected to field.; Hampshire's score of 249/8 was their highest in Twenty20 cricket.; Hampshire's score of 249/8 was the highest Derbyshire had conceded in Twenty20 cricket.; Hampshire advanced to Finals Day.				County Ground, Derby; Umpires: M Gough and AG Wharf; Player of the match: Shahid Afridi (Hampshire)

=== Finals Day ===
As a result of winning their quarter-final, Hampshire advanced to Finals Day to be held at Edgbaston on 2 September. After the 4th quarter-final it was confirmed that Hampshire had been drawn against Nottinghamshire in the second semi-final.

2 September 2017	Nottinghamshire; 169/7 (20 overs)	v	Hampshire; 146 (18.4 overs)	Nottinghamshire won by 23 runs
	Nottinghamshire; 169/7 (20 overs)	v	Hampshire; 146 (18.4 overs)	Edgbaston, Birmingham; Umpires: RJ Bailey and M Gough; Player of the match: Steven Mullaney (Nottinghamshire)
	MH Wessels 48 (27); CP Wood 2/17 (2 overs)		JM Vince 56 (32); HF Gurney 3/19 (3 overs)	Edgbaston, Birmingham; Umpires: RJ Bailey and M Gough; Player of the match: Steven Mullaney (Nottinghamshire)
Hampshire won the toss and elected to field.; Nottinghamshire advanced to the final.				Edgbaston, Birmingham; Umpires: RJ Bailey and M Gough; Player of the match: Steven Mullaney (Nottinghamshire)

== Statistics ==
=== Batting ===
==== First-class ====
First-class (including matches vs. Cardiff MCCU and South Africa A)
Player	Matches	Innings	NO	Runs	HS	Ave	SR	100	50	0	4s	6s
James Vince	13	21	0	738	147	35.14	58.29	2	2	1	109	3
Sean Ervine	15	23	1	653	203	29.68	53.65	1	3	3	76	1
George Bailey	11	18	0	651	161	36.16	61.58	2	3	4	87	3
James Adams	13	19	0	580	166	30.52	44.00	2	1	2	76	2
Gareth Berg	14	20	2	568	99*	31.55	74.83	0	2	1	67	14
Kyle Abbott	14	18	4	418	97*	29.85	65.00	0	2	1	53	6
Liam Dawson	11	18	0	386	75	21.44	42.55	0	2	0	49	3
Michael Carberry	8	12	0	372	100	31.00	45.20	1	2	0	54	3
Lewis McManus	11	16	2	323	41*	23.07	51.92	0	0	1	42	3
Rilee Rossouw	8	13	0	253	99	19.46	64.54	0	1	5	40	1
Tom Alsop	7	11	0	235	62	21.36	47.18	0	2	2	39	0
Ian Holland	9	13	4	234	58*	26.00	42.77	0	2	2	26	0
Calvin Dickinson	2	3	0	113	99	37.66	90.40	0	1	0	17	3
Mason Crane	8	10	3	66	29	9.42	39.05	0	0	4	8	1
Brad Taylor	2	4	2	55	18	27.50	37.67	0	0	0	8	0
Joe Weatherley	3	5	0	45	35	11.25	66.17	0	0	0	7	0
Asher Hart	2	4	1	44	36	14.66	30.55	0	0	1	3	1
Fidel Edwards	10	11	4	43	20	6.14	46.23	0	0	3	6	0
Brad Wheal	6	7	2	40	18	8.00	26.84	0	0	3	5	0
Ryan Stevenson	1	2	1	39	20	39.00	44.31	0	0	0	6	0
Matt Salisbury	3	5	2	33	17*	11.00	31.42	0	0	1	3	1
Reece Topley	2	3	2	23	16	23.00	23.46	0	0	0	3	0
Will Smith	1	2	0	20	18	10.00	46.51	0	0	0	4	0
Felix Organ	1	1	0	16	16	16.00	44.44	0	0	0	2	0
Chris Wood	1	2	0	5	5	2.50	45.45	0	0	1	0	0

As of 28 September 2017 — Source: CricInfo

==== List A ====
List A
Player	Matches	Innings	NO	Runs	HS	Ave	SR	100	50	0	4s	6s
James Vince	7	7	1	463	178	77.16	113.75	1	3	0	50	8
George Bailey	6	6	2	312	145*	78.00	92.30	1	2	1	25	4
Tom Alsop	7	7	1	203	112*	33.83	66.55	1	1	1	21	0
Rilee Rossouw	3	3	0	196	156	65.33	130.66	1	0	0	33	2
Liam Dawson	7	7	1	160	74	26.66	78.04	0	1	1	11	0
Sean Ervine	7	6	1	112	33*	22.40	93.33	0	0	0	9	1
Lewis McManus	7	5	2	85	33	41.50	28.33	0	0	0	7	2
Kyle Abbott	6	3	1	79	56	39.50	85.86	0	1	0	3	3
James Adams	2	2	0	58	36	29.00	109.43	0	0	0	9	0
Gareth Berg	5	4	1	19	15	6.33	82.60	0	0	0	2	0
Ian Holland	2	1	1	11	11*	—	100.00	0	0	0	0	0
Michael Carberry	3	3	0	9	9	9.00	47.36	0	0	2	2	0
Mason Crane	7	2	1	5	3	5.00	71.42	0	0	0	0	0
Reece Topley	5	1	1	0	0*	—	—	0	0	0	0	0

As of 14 May 2017 — Source: CricInfo

==== Twenty20 ====
Twenty20
Player	Matches	Innings	NO	Runs	HS	Ave	SR	100	50	0	4s	6s
James Vince	15	15	1	542	81	38.71	158.47	0	5	1	68	18
George Bailey	15	15	5	301	89*	30.10	125.94	0	1	1	28	6
Tom Alsop	10	10	2	267	64	33.37	120.27	0	1	0	27	3
Rilee Rossouw	10	10	1	255	60	28.33	137.09	0	1	0	29	6
Michael Carberry	8	8	1	224	77	32.00	150.33	0	1	0	21	9
Shahid Afridi	12	9	0	151	101	16.77	157.29	1	0	2	13	8
Lewis McManus	10	8	2	128	59	21.33	134.73	0	1	1	6	8
Calvin Dickinson	5	5	0	102	51	20.40	152.23	0	1	0	16	2
Gareth Berg	14	8	3	72	31	14.40	122.03	0	0	1	3	1
Sean Ervine	10	8	2	65	23*	10.83	87.83	0	0	1	4	1
Liam Dawson	8	6	1	46	18	9.20	104.54	0	0	0	3	1
Kyle Abbott	15	7	1	25	14	4.16	100.00	0	0	3	2	1
Chris Wood	9	3	2	15	13*	15.00	55.55	0	0	0	1	0
Mason Crane	13	3	2	9	3*	9.00	56.25	0	0	0	0	0
Fidel Edwards	1	1	1	8	8*	—	133.33	0	0	0	0	1
Jake Lintott	1	1	0	8	8	8.00	44.44	0	0	0	0	0
Brad Wheal	1	1	1	2	2*	—	66.66	0	0	0	0	0
Reece Topley	7	3	1	1	1*	0.50	16.66	0	0	2	0	0

As of 2 September 2017 — Source: CricInfo

=== Bowling ===
==== First-class ====
First-class (including matches vs. Cardiff MCCU and South Africa A)
Player	Matches	Innings	Overs	Maidens	Runs	Wickets	BBI	Ave	Econ	SR	5w	10wm
Kyle Abbott	14	26	415.3	131	1092	60	7/41	18.20	2.62	41.5	4	0
Gareth Berg	14	26	391.5	103	987	37	4/28	26.67	2.51	63.5	0	0
Fidel Edwards	10	17	221.5	35	794	33	5/49	24.06	3.57	40.3	2	0
Liam Dawson	11	20	350.2	94	835	32	4/22	26.09	2.38	65.6	0	0
Ian Holland	9	17	158.0	45	416	19	4/16	21.89	2.63	49.8	0	0
Mason Crane	8	14	223.1	34	830	16	5/40	51.87	3.71	83.6	1	0
Brad Wheal	6	12	120.5	22	476	15	4/98	31.73	3.93	48.3	0	0
Matt Salisbury	3	5	74.3	11	271	8	3/65	33.87	3.63	55.8	0	0
Sean Ervine	15	13	135.4	31	341	7	2/1	48.71	2.51	116.2	0	0
Asher Hart	2	4	43.5	8	111	5	3/17	22.20	2.53	52.6	0	0
Brad Taylor	2	3	64.0	3	275	4	2/57	68.75	4.29	96.0	0	0
Reece Topley	2	4	44.2	6	178	2	1/56	89.00	4.01	133.0	0	0
James Vince	13	4	8.5	0	38	1	1/13	38.00	4.30	53.0	0	0
Joe Weatherley	3	2	15.0	3	55	1	1/46	55.00	3.66	90.0	0	0
James Adams	13	1	1.0	1	0	0	—	—	0.00	—	0	0
Michael Carberry	8	2	5.0	2	5	0	—	—	1.00	—	0	0
George Bailey	11	1	2.0	0	9	0	—	—	4.50	—	0	0
Chris Wood	1	2	3.0	0	12	0	—	—	4.00	—	0	0
Ryan Stevenson	1	2	15.0	2	55	0	—	—	3.66	—	0	0

As of 29 September 2017 — Source: CricInfo

==== List A ====
List A
Player	Matches	Innings	Overs	Maidens	Runs	Wickets	BBI	Ave	Econ	SR	4w	5w
Mason Crane	7	7	64.0	1	384	14	3/53	27.42	6.00	27.4	0	0
Reece Topley	5	5	45.3	3	300	9	4/68	33.33	6.59	30.3	1	0
Liam Dawson	7	7	68.0	3	303	9	3/30	33.66	4.45	45.3	0	0
Gareth Berg	5	5	46.0	1	253	7	3/44	36.14	5.50	39.4	0	0
Kyle Abbott	6	6	52.2	1	300	7	2/46	42.85	5.73	44.8	0	0
Ian Holland	2	2	19.0	1	117	3	2/57	39.00	6.15	38.0	0	0
Fidel Edwards	2	2	19.2	0	137	3	2/57	45.66	7.08	38.6	0	0
Sean Ervine	7	4	10.3	0	58	2	1/17	29.00	5.52	31.5	0	0
Chris Wood	1	1	5.3	0	30	0	—	—	5.45	—	0	0

As of 14 May 2017 — Source: CricInfo

==== Twenty20 ====
Twenty20
Player	Matches	Innings	Overs	Maidens	Runs	Wickets	BBI	Ave	Econ	SR	4w	5w
Mason Crane	13	13	47.0	0	312	18	3/15	17.33	6.63	15.6	0	0
Kyle Abbott	15	15	54.3	0	487	17	3/22	28.64	8.93	19.2	0	0
Liam Dawson	8	8	32.0	2	237	14	3/28	16.92	7.40	13.7	0	0
Shahid Afridi	12	12	44.0	0	317	13	4/20	24.38	7.20	20.3	2	0
Gareth Berg	14	14	45.1	0	393	13	3/35	30.23	8.70	20.8	0	0
Chris Wood	9	9	28.0	0	257	9	2/17	28.55	9.17	18.6	0	0
Reece Topley	7	7	24.0	0	193	7	3/23	27.57	8.04	20.5	0	0
Jake Lintott	1	1	3.0	0	24	1	1/24	24.00	8.00	18.00	0	0
Ian Holland	1	1	4.0	0	33	1	1/33	33.00	8.25	24.0	0	0
Brad Wheal	1	1	4.0	0	45	1	1/45	45.00	11.25	24.0	0	0
Fidel Edwards	1	1	3.2	0	29	0	—	—	8.70	—	0	0

As of 2 September 2017 — Source: CricInfo
