= List of Hampshire County Cricket Club Twenty20 players =

Hampshire County Cricket Club was formed in 1863, and first appeared in the County Championship in 1895 and played their first List A match in 1963. They played their first Twenty20 match in the 2003 Twenty20 Cup against Sussex. The players in this list have all played at least one Twenty20 match for Hampshire. Hampshire cricketers who have not represented the county in Twenty20 cricket are excluded from the list.

Players are listed in order of appearance, where players made their debut in the same match, they are ordered by batting order. Players in bold have played only Twenty20 cricket for the Hampshire.

== Key ==
**General**

- ♠ – Captain
- † – Wicket-keeper
- **First** – Year of debut for Hampshire
- **Last** – Year of latest match played for Hampshire
- **Mat** – Number of matches played for Hampshire
- **Win%** – Winning percentage

**Batting**

- **Inn** – Number of innings batted
- **NO** – Number of innings not out
- **Runs** – Runs scored in career
- **HS** – Highest score
- **100** – Centuries scored
- **50** – Half-centuries scored
- **Avg** – Runs scored per dismissal
- * – Batsman remained not out

**Bowling**

- **Balls** – Balls bowled in career
- **Wkt** – Wickets taken in career
- **BBI** – Best bowling in an innings
- **BBM** – Best bowling in a match
- **Ave** – Average runs per wicket

**Fielding**

- **Ca** – Catches taken
- **St** – Stumpings effected

== List of players ==
No.	Name	Nationality	First	Last	Mat	Runs	HS	Avg	Balls	Wkt	BBI	Ave	Ca	St
No.	Name	Nationality	First	Last	Mat	Batting			Bowling				Fielding	
1	James Hamblin	England	2003	2003	5	124	38	24.80	48	7	3/31	10.14	1	0
2	Derek Kenway †	England	2003	2005	10	134	40	14.88	0	0	–	–	4	3
3	Wasim Akram ♠	Pakistan	2003	2003	5	55	24	13.75	114	8	2/19	15.12	0	0
4	Simon Katich	Australia	2003	2012	12	344	59*	49.14	0	0	–	–	4	0
5	Dimitri Mascarenhas ♠	England	2003	2013	74	732	52	20.33	1,493	94	5/14	18.19	13	0
6	John Crawley ♠	England	2003	2004	10	107	23	11.88	0	0	–	–	3	0
7	William Kendall	England	2003	2003	4	13	12	4.33	0	0	–	–	1	0
8	Nic Pothas ♠†	South Africa	2003	2011	79	687	59	21.46	0	0	–	–	33	14
9	Shaun Udal ♠	England	2003	2006	25	188	37	17.09	465	25	3/21	22.28	7	0
10	Alan Mullally	England	2003	2004	6	0	0	0.00	102	2	1/16	61.50	1	0
11	Ed Giddins	England	2003	2003	5	1	1	0.50	66	2	1/19	54.50	0	0
12	Lawrence Prittipaul	England	2003	2005	13	84	35	10.50	83	2	2/17	54.50	5	0
13	Michael Clarke	Australia	2004	2004	6	151	46	25.16	51	1	1/27	76.00	4	0
14	Michael Brown	England	2004	2008	10	184	44	20.44	0	0	–	–	4	0
15	Shane Watson	Australia	2004	2004	5	122	97*	30.50	0	0	–	–	3	0
16	Greg Lamb	Zimbabwe	2004	2008	38	462	67	17.11	367	19	4/28	27.52	11	0
17	Chris Tremlett	England	2004	2009	24	58	13	7.25	507	30	4/25	20.30	5	0
18	James Bruce	England	2004	2007	20	30	12	7.50	288	15	3/20	26.06	11	0
19	Billy Taylor	England	2004	2009	37	22	12*	22.00	713	30	2/9	29.43	3	0
20	Shane Warne ♠	Australia	2004	2005	2	12	12	6.00	48	1	1/29	51.00	0	0
21	Craig McMillan	New Zealand	2005	2005	7	183	65*	36.60	60	6	2/21	17.00	2	0
22	Sean Ervine ♠	Zimbabwe	2005	2017	144	2,518	75*	24.44	936	50	4/12	27.20	49	0
23	James Adams ♠	England	2005	2016	123	2,393	101*	23.93	36	0	–	–	33	0
24	Richard Logan	England	2005	2005	7	0	0	0.00	84	5	4/37	23.00	0	0
25	Mitchell Stokes	England	2005	2006	14	179	62	14.91	6	0	–	–	4	0
26	Tom Burrows †	England	2005	2009	2	0	0	0.00	0	0	–	–	2	0
27	Michael Carberry	England	2006	2017	112	3,066	100*	31.28	18	1	1/16	19.00	38	0
28	Dominic Thornely	Australia	2006	2006	8	150	50*	21.42	122	9	4/22	17.88	5	0
29	Chris Benham	England	2006	2010	37	447	59	15.96	0	0	–	–	20	0
30	Jono McLean	South Africa	2006	2006	6	39	23	9.75	0	0	–	–	1	0
31	James Tomlinson	England	2006	2006	2	5	5	5.00	42	1	1/20	48.00	0	0
32	David Balcombe	England	2006	2014	2	3	3	3.00	31	0	–	–	0	0
33	Michael Lumb	England	2007	2011	47	1,101	124*	24.46	0	0	–	–	11	0
34	**Adam Voges**	Australia	2007	2007	7	106	66*	17.66	18	3	2/16	6.00	5	0
35	David Griffiths	England	2007	2013	9	4	4*	–	186	9	3/13	26.33	1	0
36	**Ian Harvey**	Australia	2008	2008	9	197	43	21.88	156	7	2/20	27.00	3	0
37	Kevin Pietersen	England	2008	2010	2	58	43	29.00	24	3	3/33	15.66	2	0
38	Nantie Hayward	South Africa	2008	2008	10	6	5	3.00	210	13	3/22	21.38	5	0
39	Liam Dawson ♠	England	2008	present	191	1,885	82	17.95	3,499	165	5/17	25.84	83	0
40	Hamza Riazuddin	England	2008	2013	17	24	13*	8.00	348	21	4/15	19.85	2	0
41	Dominic Cork ♠	England	2009	2011	45	141	21	12.81	884	43	3/30	24.06	7	0
42	Imran Tahir	South Africa	2009	2011	27	21	17*	10.50	552	25	3/13	22.92	10	0
43	Neil McKenzie ♠	South Africa	2010	2013	55	1,289	89*	41.58	0	0	–	–	15	0
44	**Abdul Razzaq**	Pakistan	2010	2010	10	183	44	20.33	188	7	2/16	35.00	1	0
45	Danny Briggs	England	2010	2024/25	98	44	9	6.28	2,095	121	5/19	19.60	18	0
46	Chris Wood ♠	England	2010	present	219	584	31	11.68	4,521	237	5/32	26.01	50	0
47	Daniel Christian	Australia	2010	2010	12	33	10*	8.25	218	9	2/37	31.55	7	0
48	James Vince ♠†	England	2010	present	232	6,972	129*	35.03	78	3	1/5	29.00	153	0
49	Simon Jones	Wales	2010	2011	14	4	2	4.00	300	23	4/10	15.26	0	0
50	Michael Bates †	England	2010	2014	37	63	15	10.50	0	0	–	–	16	10
51	Johann Myburgh	South Africa	2010/11	2010/11	6	223	88	44.60	84	2	1/10	43.00	2	0
52	Benny Howell	England	2010/11	2025	53	547	62*	21.88	691	35	2/12	26.91	24	0
53	Shahid Afridi	Pakistan	2011	2017	36	536	101	17.29	783	41	5/20	20.24	10	0
54	Glenn Maxwell	Australia	2012	2014	22	359	66*	21.12	165	7	3/36	31.57	9	0
55	Kabir Ali	England	2012	2012	5	26	13*	–	86	1	1/31	143.00	2	0
56	Adam Wheater †	England	2013	2016	47	598	78	21.35	0	0	–	–	21	12
57	Sohail Tanvir	Pakistan	2013	2013	9	9	7*	9.00	188	9	3/29	30.22	1	0
58	Matt Coles	England	2014	2014	15	175	54	19.44	342	18	2/24	26.05	0	0
59	Will Smith	England	2014	2016	36	280	37	14.73	690	35	3/15	24.14	8	0
60	Joe Gatting	England	2014	2015	7	49	22	16.33	0	0	–	–	6	0
61	Kyle Abbott	South Africa	2014	2021	44	121	29	11.00	950	49	3/15	27.87	6	0
62	**Owais Shah**	England	2014	2015	22	558	64	31.00	0	0	–	–	4	0
63	Brad Taylor	England	2014	2019	8	23	9*	7.66	104	4	2/20	32.00	3	0
64	Nathan Rimmington	Australia	2014	2014	1	0	0	0.00	24	0	–	–	0	0
65	Yasir Arafat	Pakistan	2015	2015	16	15	9	3.75	329	17	4/37	28.64	3	0
66	Fidel Edwards	Barbados	2015	2018	11	15	8*	7.50	248	8	2/30	43.75	0	0
67	Jackson Bird	Australia	2015	2015	6	1	1	1.00	96	4	2/41	41.75	3	0
68	Gareth Berg	Italy	2015	2018	34	203	31	14.50	572	26	3/34	33.07	8	0
69	Mason Crane	England	2015	2023	68	81	12*	27.00	1,371	75	3/15	23.92	13	0
70	Sean Terry	Ireland	2015	2015	1	1	1	1.00	0	0	–	–	0	0
71	Ryan McLaren	South Africa	2016	2016	3	39	23	19.50	54	5	2/14	14.60	1	0
72	Gareth Andrew	England	2016	2016	9	64	31	16.00	120	8	2/19	22.25	3	0
73	Tino Best	Barbados	2016	2016	9	16	8	5.33	163	4	2/38	64.50	2	0
74	**Daren Sammy**	Saint Lucia	2016	2016	7	70	30	14.00	83	6	2/20	21.00	1	0
75	Lewis McManus †	England	2016	2021	61	674	60*	16.85	0	0	–	–	27	15
76	Ryan Stevenson	England	2016	2021	22	62	17	10.33	387	14	2/28	44.35	6	0
77	Tom Alsop †	England	2016	2021	42	793	85	22.65	0	0	–	–	15	3
78	Joe Weatherley	England	2016	present	110	2,741	88*	31.87	6	0	–	–	39	0
79	Brad Wheal	Scotland	2016	2025	41	30	16	5.00	808	54	5/38	21.83	8	0
80	**Gavin Griffiths**	England	2016	2016	4	6	4*	–	72	5	3/33	20.20	2	0
81	**Jake Goodwin**	England	2016	2016	1	32	32	32.00	0	0	–	–	0	0
82	Rilee Rossouw	South Africa	2017	2019	35	646	60	20.83	0	0	–	–	20	0
83	George Bailey	Australia	2017	2017	15	301	89*	30.10	0	0	–	–	5	0
84	Reece Topley	England	2017	2017	7	1	1*	0.50	144	7	3/23	27.57	1	0
85	Ian Holland	United States	2017	2021	17	191	65	27.28	193	5	1/14	50.60	4	0
86	Calvin Dickinson †	England	2017	2018	6	103	51	17.16	0	0	–	–	4	2
87	**Jake Lintott**	England	2017	2017	1	8	8	8.00	18	1	1/24	24.00	0	0
88	**Colin Munro**	New Zealand	2018	2018	8	211	63	26.37	60	4	2/20	19.25	3	0
89	Sam Northeast ♠	England	2018	2021	36	684	73*	20.72	0	0	–	–	11	0
90	**Mujeeb Ur Rahman**	Afghanistan	2018	2018	12	10	8*	5.00	269	9	2/31	35.33	1	0
91	Dale Steyn	South Africa	2018	2018	4	19	11*	–	92	5	2/29	21.60	1	0
92	Tom Scriven	England	2018	2020	2	2	2	2.00	6	0	–	–	0	0
93	Aneurin Donald †	Wales	2019	2023	19	242	51	14.23	0	0	–	–	11	0
94	James Fuller	England	2019	present	113	1,370	57	22.09	1,342	75	4/17	27.16	46	0
95	**Chris Morris**	South Africa	2019	2019	11	86	18*	14.33	228	12	3/22	24.75	8	0
96	**Tabraiz Shamsi**	South Africa	2019	2019	4	0	–	–	90	3	1/32	47.00	0	0
97	**George Munsey**	Scotland	2020	2020	5	55	32	11.00	0	0	–	–	1	0
98	Scott Currie	Scotland	2020	present	53	44	13*	4.88	1,074	81	4/18	18.34	16	0
99	Felix Organ	England	2020	present	5	24	9	6.00	66	3	2/21	25.00	1	0
100	**Shaheen Afridi**	Pakistan	2020	2020	7	9	9*	9.00	156	7	6/19	30.00	0	0
101	**Calvin Harrison**	England	2020	2020	2	2	2*	2.00	38	1	1/39	64.00	1	0
102	**D'Arcy Short**	Australia	2021	2021	12	316	69	26.33	156	6	2/25	38.00	5	0
103	Tom Prest	England	2021	present	50	881	64	19.15	36	2	1/8	21.50	15	0
104	Colin de Grandhomme	New Zealand	2021	2021	7	150	66	21.42	60	2	2/41	53.00	3	0
105	Toby Albert †	England	2021	present	71	1,413	98*	27.17	0	0	–	–	23	1
106	**Ben McDermott** †	Australia	2022	2024	44	1,138	83	27.75	0	0	–	–	34	10
107	Ross Whiteley	England	2022	2023	33	361	41*	16.41	6	0	–	–	7	0
108	**Nathan Ellis**	Australia	2022	2023	29	58	15	11.60	588	38	4/6	18.37	8	0
109	Nick Gubbins	England	2022	present	4	15	14	3.75	0	0	–	–	0	0
110	John Turner	England	2023	2025	27	11	4	11.00	518	41	4/23	17.82	5	0
111	Ali Orr	England	2024	2026	9	77	28	8.55	0	0	–	–	8	0
112	Michael Neser	Australia	2024	2024	7	39	19	19.50	143	11	3/32	19.18	3	0
113	Fletcha Middleton	England	2024	present	3	36	18	18.00	0	0	–	–	1	0
114	Eddie Jack	England	2024	present	7	17	14	8.50	132	8	2/43	30.12	2	0
115	**Shan Masood**	Pakistan	2024/25	2024/25	4	159	79	39.75	0	0	–	–	2	0
116	Sonny Baker	England	2024/25	present	20	3	3*	1.50	441	35	5/21	17.60	4	0
117	**Dewald Brevis**	South Africa	2025	2025	8	166	68	33.20	0	0	–	–	5	0
118	Bjorn Fortuin	South Africa	2025	2025	5	4	4*	–	90	2	1/16	59.00	1	0
119	**Lhuan-dre Pretorius** †	South Africa	2025	2025	4	110	44*	36.66	0	0	–	–	0	0
120	**Chris Lynn**	Australia	2025	2025	4	222	108*	74.00	0	0	–	–	0	0
121	**Hilton Cartwright**	Australia	2025	2026	22	526	70	40.46	0	0	–	–	19	0
122	Ben Mayes	England	2025	present	12	174	55*	29.00	0	0	–	–	3	0
123	Delano Potgieter	South Africa	2026	2026	3	26	24	13.00	26	1	1/22	41.00	1	0
124	Manny Lumsden	England	2026	present	5	0	0	0.00	99	5	2/26	34.20	0	0
125	**Tristan Stubbs**	South Africa	2026	2026	12	288	69*	41.14	36	0	–	–	4	0
126	Andrew Neal	England	2026	present	5	3	3	3.00	108	6	3/29	23.33	2	0
127	Jake Lehmann	Australia	2026	present	1	0	–	–	0	0	–	–	0	0

== See also ==
- Hampshire County Cricket Club
- List of Hampshire County Cricket Club first-class players
- List of Hampshire County Cricket Club List A players
- List of international cricketers from Hampshire
