= List of international cricketers from Hampshire =

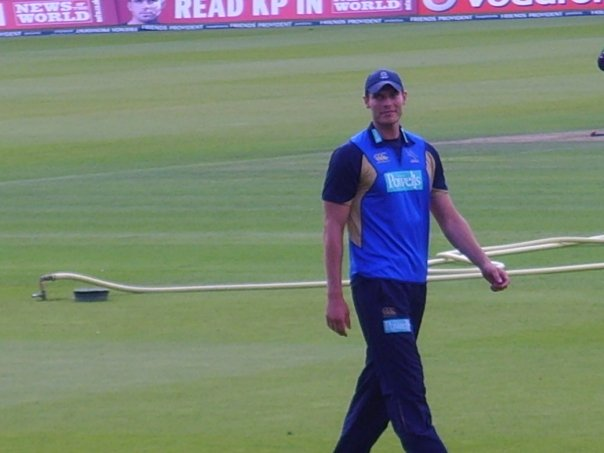
Chris Tremlett (pictured) is the last cricketer to be born in Hampshire to have represented England.

Hampshire is one of the eighteen counties which make up the first-class structure of English county cricket. It has produced international cricketers for the England cricket team in all forms of the game — Tests, One Day Internationals (ODIs) and Twenty20 Internationals (T20Is). No player born in Hampshire has ever captained England. Victor Barton, from Netley, became the first Hampshire-born player to represent England when he played against South Africa in 1892, which was his only Test appearance. Nine cricketers born in Hampshire have represented England, with Chris Tremlett, born in Southampton, the last. Sean Terry, born in Southampton, is the only international player born in Hampshire to represent another nation, in this case Ireland. 111 cricketers born outside of Hampshire have played county cricket for Hampshire, as well as playing international cricket. Of these, 75 have played international cricket for a team other than England, while 4 have played internationally, but not in matches recognised by the ICC. 3 cricketers who represented Hampshire Cricket Board but not Hampshire have also played international cricket, their statistics are also listed below.

Two female cricketers from Hampshire have played internationally. Margaret Wilks represented England and Young England internationally between 1973 and 1978 (but did not represent Hampshire Women), while Pippa Sproul has represented Scotland since 2024 (and represented Hampshire between 2023 and 2024) - both players were born in Southampton.

== From Hampshire ==
Key

- Apps denotes the number of appearances the player has made.
- Runs denotes the number of runs scored by the player.
- Wkts denotes the number of wickets taken by the player.

England captains

Statistics correct as of: 27 September 2026

=== England ===
Name	International career	Hampshire career	Apps	Runs	Wkts	Apps	Runs	Wkts	Apps	Runs	Wkts	References
Name	International career	Hampshire career	Tests			ODIs			T20Is			References
Victor Barton	1892	1895–1902	1	23	–	–	–	–	–	–	–	
Arthur Hill	1896	1895–1921	3	251	4	–	–	–	–	–	–	
Frank Milligan	1899	N/A	2	58	–	–	–	–	–	–	–	
John Evans	1921	1908–1920	1	18	–	–	–	–	–	–	–	
Ken Palmer	1961	N/A	1	10	1	–	–	–	–	–	–	
Graham Roope	1973–1978	N/A	21	860	–	8	173	–	–	–	–	
Trevor Jesty	1983	1966–1984	–	–	–	10	127	1	–	–	–	
Shaun Udal	1994–2006	1989–2007	4	109	8	11	35	9	–	–	–	
Chris Tremlett	2005–2013	2000–2009	12	113	53	15	50	15	1	–	2	

=== Ireland ===
Name	International career	Hampshire career	Apps	Runs	Wkts	Apps	Runs	Wkts	Apps	Runs	Wkts	References
Name	International career	Hampshire career	Tests			ODIs			T20Is			References
Sean Terry (Note: Terry was born in Southampton, however represented Ireland in international cricket.)	2016	2012–2015	–	–	–	5	32	–	1	4	–	

== Played for Hampshire CCC ==
The cricketers listed in this section have played for Hampshire County Cricket Club and played Test, One Day Internationals and Twenty20 Internationals for an international team, but were not born in the county. Players are listed in order from the year of their International debut.

=== Afghanistan ===
Name	International career	Hampshire career	Apps	Runs	Wkts	Apps	Runs	Wkts	Apps	Runs	Wkts	References
Name	International career	Hampshire career	Tests			ODIs			T20Is			References
Mujeeb Ur Rahman	2017–	2018	1	18	1	75	236	101	68	98	87	

=== Africa XI ===
Name	International career	Hampshire career	Apps	Runs	Wkts	Apps	Runs	Wkts	Apps	Runs	Wkts	References
Name	International career	Hampshire career	Tests			ODIs			T20Is			References
Dale Steyn (Note: Steyn played international cricket for both the South Africa and Africa XI. Only his statistics for Africa XI are shown here.)	2005	2018	–	–	–	2	4	2	–	–	–	
Heath Streak (Note: Streak played international cricket for both the Zimbabwe and Africa XI. Only his statistics for Africa XI are shown here.)	2005–2006	1995	–	–	–	2	41	2	–	–	–	

=== Asia XI ===
Name	International career	Hampshire career	Apps	Runs	Wkts	Apps	Runs	Wkts	Apps	Runs	Wkts	References
Name	International career	Hampshire career	Tests			ODIs			T20Is			References
Abdul Razzaq (Note: Razzaq played international cricket for the Pakistan and the Asia XI. Only his statistics for Asia XI are shown here.)	2004–2006	2010	–	–	–	4	49	1	–	–	–	
Chaminda Vaas (Note: Vaas played international cricket for both the Sri Lanka and Asia XI. Only his statistics for Asia XI are shown here.)	2004–2005	2003	–	–	–	1	7	1	–	–	–	
Shahid Afridi (Note: Afridi played international cricket for the Pakistan, Asia XI and World XI. Only his statistics for Asia XI are shown here.)	2005–2006	2011–2017	–	–	–	3	19	2	–	–	–	

=== Australia ===
Name	International career	Hampshire career	Apps	Runs	Wkts	Apps	Runs	Wkts	Apps	Runs	Wkts	References
Name	International career	Hampshire career	Tests			ODIs			T20Is			References
Shaun Graf	1980–1981	1981	–	–	–	11	24	8	–	–	–	
Shane Warne (Note: Warne played international cricket for both the Australia and World XI. Only his statistics for Australia are shown here.)	1992–2007	2000–2007	145	3,154	708	193	1,016	291	–	–	–	
Matthew Hayden (Note: Hayden played international cricket for both the Australia and World XI. Only his statistics for Australia are shown here.)	1993–2009	1997	103	8,625	–	160	6,131	–	9	308	–	
Andy Bichel	1997–2004	2005	19	355	58	67	471	78	–	–	–	
Ian Harvey	1997–2004	2008	–	–	–	73	715	85	–	–	–	
Simon Katich	2001–2010	2003–2012	56	4,188	21	45	1,324	–	3	69	–	
Shane Watson	2002–2016	2004–2005	59	3,731	75	190	5,758	168	58	1,462	48	
Michael Clarke	2004–2015	2004	115	8,643	31	245	7,981	57	34	488	6	
Stuart Clark	2005–2009	2007	24	248	94	39	69	53	9	–	13	
Adam Voges	2007–2017	2007	20	1,485	–	31	870	6	7	139	2	
Luke Ronchi (Note: Ronchi played international cricket for both Australia and New Zealand. Only his statistics for Australia are shown here.)	2008–2009	N/A (Note: Represented Hampshire Cricket Board and did not play for Hampshire.)	–	–	–	4	76	–	3	47	–	
Marcus North	2009–2010	2009	21	1,171	14	2	6	–	1	20	–	
Phillip Hughes	2009–2014	2010	26	1,535	–	25	826	–	1	6	–	
Dan Christian	2010–2021	2010	–	–	–	20	273	20	23	118	13	
George Bailey (Note: Bailey played international cricket for both the Australia and World XI. Only his statistics for Australia are shown here.)	2011–2016	2013–2017	5	183	–	90	3,044	–	29	470	–	
Glenn Maxwell	2012–	2012–2014	7	339	8	149	3,990	77	130	2,897	51	
Jackson Bird	2012–2017	2015	9	43	34	–	–	–	–	–	–	
Chris Lynn	2014–2018	2025	–	–	–	4	75	–	18	291	–	
Hilton Cartwright	2017	2025–2026	2	55	–	2	2	–	–	–	–	
D'Arcy Short	2018–2020	2021	–	–	–	8	211	–	23	642	3	
Michael Neser	2018–	2024	5	131	22	4	11	4	–	–	–	
Ben McDermott	2018–2023	2022–2024	–	–	–	5	223	–	25	342	–	
Nathan Ellis	2021–	2022–2023	–	–	–	26	185	40	39	39	58	

=== Denmark ===
Thomas Hansen (Hampshire 1997–1999) played 23 List A matches and 19 ICC Trophy matches for Denmark (1997–2005), but these did not have International status.

=== England ===
Name	International career	Hampshire career	Apps	Runs	Wkts	Apps	Runs	Wkts	Apps	Runs	Wkts	References
Name	International career	Hampshire career	Tests			ODIs			T20Is			References
James Southerton	1877	1864–1867	2	7	7	–	–	–	–	–	–	
Leslie Gay	1894	1900	1	37	–	–	–	–	–	–	–	
Christopher Heseltine	1895–1896	1895–1904	2	18	5	–	–	–	–	–	–	
C. B. Fry	1896–1912	1909–1921	26	1,223	–	–	–	–	–	–	–	
Teddy Wynyard	1896–1906	1878–1908	3	72	–	–	–	–	–	–	–	
Phil Mead	1911–1928	1905–1936	17	1,185	–	–	–	–	–	–	–	
Hon. Lionel Tennyson	1913–1921	1913–1935	9	345	–	–	–	–	–	–	–	
George Brown	1921–1923	1908–1933	7	299	0	–	–	–	–	–	–	
Alec Kennedy	1922–1923	1907–1936	5	93	31	–	–	–	–	–	–	
Johnny Arnold	1931	1929–1950	1	34	–	–	–	–	–	–	–	
Derek Shackleton	1950–1963	1948–1969	7	113	18	–	–	–	–	–	–	
Butch White	1961–1962	1957–1971	2	0	4	–	–	–	–	–	–	
Bob Cottam	1969–1972	1963–1971	4	27	14	–	–	–	–	–	–	
David Gower	1978–1992	1990–1993	117	8,231	1	114	3,170	–	–	–	–	
Chris Smith	1983–1986	1980–1991	8	392	3	4	109	2	–	–	–	
Paul Terry	1984	1978–1996	2	16	–	–	–	–	–	–	–	
Robin Smith	1988–1996	1982–2003	62	4,236	–	71	2,419	–	–	–	–	
John Stephenson	1989	1995–2001	1	36	–	–	–	–	–	–	–	
Dominic Cork	1992–2002	2009–2011	37	864	131	32	180	41	–	–	–	
John Crawley	1994–2003	2002–2009	37	1,800	–	13	235	–	–	–	–	
Alan Mullally	1996–2001	2000–2005	19	127	58	50	86	63	–	–	–	
Ed Giddins	1999–2000	2003	4	10	12	–	–	–	–	–	–	
Owais Shah	2001–2010	2014–2015	6	269	–	71	1,834	7	17	347	–	
Simon Jones	2002–2005	2010–2011	18	205	59	8	1	7	–	–	–	
Kabir Ali	2003–2006	2010–2013	1	10	5	14	93	20	–	–	–	
Kevin Pietersen (Note: Pietersen played international cricket for both the England and World XI. Only his statistics for England are shown here.)	2004–2014	2005–2010	104	8,181	10	134	4,422	7	37	1,176	1	
Dimitri Mascarenhas	2007–2009	1996–2013	–	–	–	20	245	13	14	123	12	
Michael Lumb	2010–2014	2007–2011	–	–	–	3	165	–	27	552	–	
Michael Carberry	2010–2014	2006–2017	6	345	–	6	114	–	1	7	–	
Danny Briggs	2012–2014	2009–2024/25	–	–	–	1	–	2	7	–	5	
James Vince	2015–2023	2009–	13	548	–	25	616	1	17	463	–	
Reece Topley	2015–	2016–2018	–	–	–	30	35	47	35	17	33	
Liam Dawson	2016–	2007–	4	110	8	11	133	12	39	79	40	
Mark Stoneman	2017–2018	2025	11	526	–	–	–	–	–	–	–	
Mason Crane	2017–2018	2015–2023	1	6	1	–	–	–	2	–	1	
Ollie Robinson	2021–	2014	24	498	104	–	–	–	–	–	–	
John Turner	2024	2021–2025	–	–	–	2	2	2	2	–	1	
Sonny Baker	2025–	2024/25–	1	4	3	2	–	1	4	–	6	
Aneurin Donald	2026–	2019–2023	–	–	–	–	–	–	3	46	–	

=== Guernsey ===
Lee Savident (Hampshire 1997–2000) and Tim Ravenscroft (Hampshire 2011) have both represented Guernsey (Savident 1993–2014 and Ravenscroft 2008–2015) in List A and T20 matches, but none of these games had International status.

=== India ===
Name	International career	Hampshire career	Apps	Runs	Wkts	Apps	Runs	Wkts	Apps	Runs	Wkts	References
Name	International career	Hampshire career	Tests			ODIs			T20Is			References
Ajinkya Rahane	2011–2023	2019	85	5,077	–	90	2,962	–	20	375	–	
Washington Sundar	2017–	2025	18	937	41	34	445	30	63	279	53	
Tilak Varma	2023–	2025	–	–	–	5	68	–	63	1,666	5	

=== Italy ===
Name	International career	Hampshire career	Apps	Runs	Wkts	Apps	Runs	Wkts	Apps	Runs	Wkts	References
Name	International career	Hampshire career	Tests			ODIs			T20Is			References
Gareth Berg	2021–2024	2015–2019	–	–	–	–	–	–	19	153	20	

=== Netherlands ===
Name	International career	Hampshire career	Apps	Runs	Wkts	Apps	Runs	Wkts	Apps	Runs	Wkts	References
Name	International career	Hampshire career	Tests			ODIs			T20Is			References
Paul-Jan Bakker	1996	1986–1992	–	–	–	5	1	3	–	–	–	

=== New Zealand ===
Name	International career	Hampshire career	Apps	Runs	Wkts	Apps	Runs	Wkts	Apps	Runs	Wkts	References
Name	International career	Hampshire career	Tests			ODIs			T20Is			References
David O'Sullivan	1973–1976	1971–1973	11	158	18	3	2	2	–	–	–	
Craig McMillan	1997–2007	2005	55	3,116	28	197	4,707	49	8	187	–	
Chris Nevin	2000–2003	N/A (Note: Represented Hampshire Cricket Board and did not play for Hampshire.)	–	–	–	37	732	–	–	–	–	
Andre Adams	2001–2007	2015	1	18	6	42	419	53	4	13	3	
Shane Bond	2001–2010	2008	18	168	87	82	292	147	20	21	25	
Colin de Grandhomme	2012–2022	2021	29	1,432	49	45	742	30	41	505	12	
Colin Munro	2012–2020	2018	1	15	2	57	1,271	7	65	1,724	4	
Luke Ronchi (Note: Ronchi played international cricket for both Australia and New Zealand. Only his statistics for New Zealand are shown here.)	2013–2017	N/A (Note: Represented Hampshire Cricket Board and did not play for Hampshire.)	4	319	–	81	1,321	–	29	312	–	

=== Pakistan ===
Name	International career	Hampshire career	Apps	Runs	Wkts	Apps	Runs	Wkts	Apps	Runs	Wkts	References
Name	International career	Hampshire career	Tests			ODIs			T20Is			References
Wasim Akram	1985–2003	2003	104	2,898	414	356	3,717	502	–	–	–	
Aaqib Javed	1989–1998	1991	22	101	54	163	267	182	–	–	–	
Abdul Razzaq (Note: Razzaq played international cricket for the Pakistan and the Asia XI. Only his statistics for Pakistan are shown here.)	1996–2013	2010	46	1,946	100	261	5,031	268	32	393	20	
Shahid Afridi (Note: Afridi played international cricket for the Pakistan, Asia XI and the World XI. Only his statistics for Pakistan are shown here.)	1996–2016	2011–2017	27	1,716	48	393	8,027	393	98	1,405	97	
Yasir Arafat	1997–2013	2015	3	94	9	11	74	4	13	92	16	
Sohail Tanvir	2007–2017	2013	2	17	5	62	399	71	57	196	54	
Mohammad Abbas	2017–	2021–2024	33	240	131	3	–	1	–	–	–	
Shan Masood	2013–	2024/25	50	2,926	2	9	163	–	19	395	–	
Shaheen Afridi	2018–	2020	34	269	126	77	332	146	103	345	136	

=== Scotland ===
Name	International career	Hampshire career	Apps	Runs	Wkts	Apps	Runs	Wkts	Apps	Runs	Wkts	References
Name	International career	Hampshire career	Tests			ODIs			T20Is			References
Josh Davey	2010–	2013	–	–	–	33	498	50	31	115	37	
George Munsey	2015–	2020	–	–	–	79	2,777	–	88	2,598	–	
Brad Wheal	2016–2026	2015–2026	–	–	–	18	49	27	26	20	24	
Brandon McMullen	2022–	2025	–	–	–	47	1,572	68	30	787	8	
Scott Currie	2024	2020–	–	–	–	3	10	3	–	–	–	

=== South Africa ===
Name	International career	Hampshire career	Apps	Runs	Wkts	Apps	Runs	Wkts	Apps	Runs	Wkts	References
Name	International career	Hampshire career	Tests			ODIs			T20Is			References
Robert Poore	1895–1896	1898–1906	3	76	1	–	–	–	–	–	–	
Charlie Llewellyn	1896–1912	1899–1910	15	544	48	–	–	–	–	–	–	
Barry Richards	1970	1968–1978	4	508	1	–	–	–	–	–	–	
Nantie Hayward	1998–2004	2008	16	66	54	21	12	21	–	–	–	
Nic Pothas	2000	2002–2011	–	–	–	3	24	–	–	–	–	
Neil McKenzie	2000–2009	2010–2012	58	3,253	–	64	1,688	–	2	7	–	
Graeme Smith (Note: Smith played international cricket for both the South Africa and World XI. Only his statistics for South Africa are shown here.)	2002–2014	N/A (Note: Represented Hampshire Cricket Board and did not play for Hampshire.)	116	9,253	8	197	6,989	18	33	982	–	
Hashim Amla (Note: Amla played international cricket for both the South Africa and World XI. Only his statistics for South Africa are shown here.)	2004–2019	2018	124	9,282	–	181	8,113	–	41	1,158	–	
Dale Steyn (Note: Steyn played international cricket for both the South Africa and Africa XI. Only his statistics for South Africa are shown here.)	2005–2020	2018	93	1,251	439	123	361	194	47	21	64	
Rory Kleinveldt	2008–2013	2008	4	27	10	10	105	12	6	25	9	
Friedel de Wet	2009–2010	2011	2	20	6	–	–	–	–	–	–	
Ryan McLaren	2009–2015	2015–2016	2	47	3	54	485	77	12	9	17	
Imran Tahir (Note: Tahir played international cricket for both the South Africa and World XI. Only his statistics for South Africa are shown here.)	2011–2019	2008–2014	20	130	57	107	157	173	35	19	61	
Chris Morris	2012–2019	2019	4	173	12	42	467	48	23	133	34	
Kyle Abbott	2013–2017	2014–	11	95	39	28	76	34	21	23	26	
Rilee Rossouw	2014–2023	2017–2019	–	–	–	36	1,239	1	29	767	–	
Tabraiz Shamsi	2016–	2019	2	20	6	55	39	73	70	10	89	
Aiden Markram	2017–	2019	50	3,192	6	86	2,708	20	77	1,966	16	
Bjorn Fortuin	2019–	2025	–	–	–	19	78	24	32	129	33	
Tristan Stubbs	2022–	2026	14	759	–	15	392	–	52	967	–	
Dewald Brevis	2023–	2025	4	138	1	12	306	–	35	923	1	
Lhuan-dre Pretorius	2025–	2025	2	235	–	3	142	–	17	427	–	
Codi Yusuf	2025–	2026	2	35	10	1	5	–	–	–	–	

=== Sri Lanka ===
Name	International career	Hampshire career	Apps	Runs	Wkts	Apps	Runs	Wkts	Apps	Runs	Wkts	References
Name	International career	Hampshire career	Tests			ODIs			T20Is			References
Chaminda Vaas (Note: Vaas played international cricket for both the Sri Lanka and Asia XI. Only his statistics for Sri Lanka are shown here.)	1994–2009	2003	111	3,089	355	321	2,018	399	6	33	6	
Rangana Herath	1999–2018	2010	93	1,699	433	71	140	74	17	8	18	

=== United States ===
Name	International career	Hampshire career	Apps	Runs	Wkts	Apps	Runs	Wkts	Apps	Runs	Wkts	References
Name	International career	Hampshire career	Tests			ODIs			T20Is			References
Ian Holland	2019–2022	2017–2024	–	–	–	15	368	19	6	47	10	

=== West Indies ===
Name	International career	Hampshire career	Apps	Runs	Wkts	Apps	Runs	Wkts	Apps	Runs	Wkts	References
Name	International career	Hampshire career	Tests			ODIs			T20Is			References
Roy Marshall	1951–1952	1953–1972	15	143	–	–	–	–	–	–	–	
Gordon Greenidge	1974–1991	1970–1987	108	7,558	–	128	5,134	1	–	–	–	
Andy Roberts	1974–1983	1973–1978	47	762	202	56	231	87	–	–	–	
Malcolm Marshall	1978–1992	1979–1993	81	1,810	376	136	955	157	–	–	–	
Winston Benjamin	1986–1995	1994–1996	21	470	61	85	298	100	–	–	–	
Nixon McLean	1996–2003	1998–1999	19	368	44	45	314	46	–	–	–	
Daren Powell	2002–2009	2007	37	407	85	55	118	71	5	1	2	
Tino Best	2003–2014	2016	25	401	57	26	76	34	6	17	6	
Fidel Edwards	2003–2021	2015–2019	55	394	165	50	73	60	26	11	20	
Daren Sammy (Note: Sammy played international cricket for both the West Indies and World XI. Only his statistics for the West Indies are shown here.)	2004–2016	2016	38	1,323	84	126	1,871	81	66	534	44	

=== World XI ===
Name	International career	Hampshire career	Apps	Runs	Wkts	Apps	Runs	Wkts	Apps	Runs	Wkts	References
Name	International career	Hampshire career	Tests			ODIs			T20Is			References
Matthew Hayden (Note: Hayden played international cricket for both the Australia and World XI. Only his statistics for World XI are shown here.)	2004–2005	1997	–	–	–	1	2	–	–	–	–	
Shane Warne (Note: Warne played international cricket for both the Australia and World XI. Only his statistics for World XI are shown here.)	2004–2005	2000–2007	–	–	–	1	2	2	–	–	–	
Graeme Smith (Note: Smith played international cricket for both the South Africa and World XI. Only his statistics for World XI are shown here.)	2005–2006	N/A (Note: Represented Hampshire Cricket Board and did not play for Hampshire.)	1	12	–	–	–	–	–	–	–	
Kevin Pietersen (Note: Pietersen played international cricket for both the England and World XI. Only his statistics for World XI are shown here.)	2005–2006	2005–2010	–	–	–	2	18	–	–	–	–	
Shahid Afridi (Note: Afridi played international cricket for the Pakistan, Asia XI and World XI. Only his statistics for World XI are shown here.)	2005–2018	2011–2017	–	–	–	2	18	–	1	11	1	
Hashim Amla (Note: Amla played international cricket for both the South Africa and World XI. Only his statistics for World XI are shown here.)	2017	2018	–	–	–	–	–	–	3	119	–	
Daren Sammy (Note: Sammy played international cricket for both the West Indies and World XI. Only his statistics for World XI are shown here.)	2017	2016	–	–	–	–	–	–	2	53	–	
Imran Tahir (Note: Tahir played international cricket for both the South Africa and World XI. Only his statistics for World XI are shown here.)	2017	2008–2014	–	–	–	–	–	–	3	–	2	
George Bailey (Note: Bailey played international cricket for both the Australia and World XI. Only his statistics for World XI are shown here.)	2017	2013–2017	–	–	–	–	–	–	1	3	–	

=== Zimbabwe ===
Name	International career	Hampshire career	Apps	Runs	Wkts	Apps	Runs	Wkts	Apps	Runs	Wkts	References
Name	International career	Hampshire career	Tests			ODIs			T20Is			References
Heath Streak (Note: Streak played international cricket for both the Zimbabwe and Africa XI. Only his statistics for Zimbabwe are shown here.)	1993–2005	1995	65	1,990	216	187	2,901	237	–	–	–	
Neil Johnson	1998–2000	2001–2002	13	532	15	48	1,679	35	–	–	–	
Sean Ervine	2001–2004	2005–2018	5	261	9	42	698	41	–	–	–	
Greg Lamb	2010–2011	2004–2008	1	46	3	15	197	12	5	32	4	

== Women's cricket ==
The cricketers listed in this section have played for Hampshire women's cricket team and played Women's Test, Women's One Day Internationals and Women's Twenty20 Internationals for an international team, but were not born in the county.

- The following players represented Hampshire Women internationally pre-professionalism but weren't born in Hampshire: Suzie Bates (for New Zealand), Maia Bouchier, Charlie Dean, Charlotte Edwards, Katie George and Betty Snowball.
- The following represented partnered regional side Southern Vipers internationally but weren't born in Hampshire: Georgia Adams, Suzie Bates (for New Zealand), Tammy Beaumont, Lauren Bell, Maia Bouchier, Arran Brindle, Charlie Dean, Freya Davies, Mignon du Preez (for South Africa), Charlotte Edwards, Georgia Elwiss, Tash Farrant, Katie George, Lydia Greenway, Freya Kemp, Amelia Kerr (for New Zealand), Gaby Lewis (for Ireland), Sara McGlashan (for New Zealand), Hayley Matthews (for the West Indies), Morna Nielsen (for New Zealand), Tara Norris (for the United States), Paige Scholfield, Anya Shrubsole, Linsey Smith, Stafanie Taylor (for the West Indies), Amanda-Jade Wellington (for Australia), Issy Wong & Danni Wyatt-Hodge
- The following represented Hampshire following professionalism but weren't born in Hampshire: Georgia Adams, Lauren Bell, Maia Bouchier, Freya Davies, Freya Kemp, Ellyse Perry (for Australia), Linsey Smith & Amanda-Jade Wellington (for Australia).

== See also ==
- Hampshire County Cricket Club
- Hampshire women's cricket team
- List of Hampshire County Cricket Club first-class players
- List of Hampshire County Cricket Club List A players
- List of Hampshire County Cricket Club Twenty20 players
- List of Southern Vipers cricketers
