= Jake Goodwin =

English cricketer

Personal information
- Full name: Jake Goodwin
- Born: 19 January 1998 (age 28); Swindon, Wiltshire, England
- Batting: Right-handed
- Bowling: Right-arm medium

Domestic team information
- Years: Team
- 2016: Hampshire
- 2016–present: Wiltshire

Career statistics
Competition	Twenty20
Matches	1
Runs scored	32
Batting average	32.00
100s/50s	–/–
Top score	32
Catches/stumpings	–/–
- Source: Cricinfo, 31 July 2016

Jake Goodwin (born 19 January 1998) is an English cricketer who played Twenty20 cricket for Hampshire and currently plays national counties cricket for Wiltshire.

Goodwin was born in Swindon in January 1998, where he was educated at Kingsdown School. Developed through Wiltshire age-group cricket by coach Alan Crouch, in 2013 he signed an academy contract with Hampshire, with Goodwin going onto represent the academy in the Southern Premier Cricket League. He later made a single senior Twenty20 appearance for Hampshire in the 2016 T20 Blast against Somerset at the Rose Bowl. Opening the batting alongside Tom Alsop, he made 32 runs before being dismissed by Dom Bess, having shared in an opening stand of 83 runs with Alsop. Despite being awarded a scholarship by Hampshire alongside Ben Duggan, Josh McCoy, and Calvin Dickinson in October 2016, he was released following the 2017 season without playing for Hampshire again.

Goodwin subsequently played national counties cricket for Wiltshire beginning in 2016, and has played for the county in all three formats of the national counties game.
