= Asher Hart =

English cricketer (born 1997)

Personal information
- Full name: Asher Hale-Bopp Joseph Arthur Hart
- Born: 30 March 1997 (age 29); Carlisle, Cumbria, England
- Batting: Right-handed
- Bowling: Right-arm medium

Domestic team information
- Years: Team
- 2016: Northumberland
- 2017–2018: Hampshire (squad no. 28)

Career statistics
Competition	First-class	List A
Matches	2	5
Runs scored	44	58
Batting average	14.66	11.60
100s/50s	–/–	–/–
Top score	36	21
Balls bowled	263	144
Wickets	5	3
Bowling average	22.20	48.00
5 wickets in innings	–	–
10 wickets in match	–	–
Best bowling	3/17	2/34
Catches/stumpings	1/–	2/–
- Source: Cricinfo, 18 February 2018

Asher Hale-Bopp Joseph Arthur Hart (born 30 March 1997) is an English former first-class cricketer.

Hart was born in Carlisle in March 1997. He was educated at Ullswater Community College in Penrith. An all-rounder, he played minor counties cricket for Northumberland in the 2016 Minor Counties Championship, making a single appearance against Cambridgeshire. Having been associated with the academy and Second XI teams at Durham, Asher signed for Hampshire ahead of the 2017 season. He made his debut for Hampshire in a first-class match against Cardiff MCCU at the Rose Bowl in 2017, with him making a further first-class appearance later in the season against the touring South Africa A cricket team. In these, he scored 44 runs and took 5 wickets with his medium pace bowling. In February 2018, he was part of the Hampshire team which took part in the 2017–18 Regional Super50 in the West Indies, making five List A one-day appearances in the competition. Hart was released by Hampshire at the end of the 2018 season, alongside Calvin Dickinson and Chris Sole.

Following his release by Hampshire, Hart returned to the North of England, where he coaches cricket at Sedbergh School.
