= Matt Salisbury =

English cricketer (born 1993)

Personal information
- Full name: Matthew Edward Thomas Salisbury
- Born: 18 April 1993 (age 33); Chelmsford, Essex, England
- Batting: Right-handed
- Bowling: Right-arm medium-fast
- Role: Bowler

Domestic team information
- Years: Team
- 2012–2013: Cambridge MCCU
- 2014–2015: Essex (squad no. 18)
- 2017: Hampshire
- 2018–2022: Durham
- 2023–2025: Leicestershire
- FC debut: 31 March 2012 Cambridge MCCU v Essex
- LA debut: 13 May 2014 Essex v Sri Lankans

Career statistics
Competition	FC	LA	T20
Matches	54	25	19
Runs scored	528	12	5
Batting average	8.65	12.00	2.50
100s/50s	0/0	0/0	0/0
Top score	45	5*	1*
Balls bowled	8,098	1,045	376
Wickets	141	28	17
Bowling average	34.15	33.50	34.05
5 wickets in innings	2	0	0
10 wickets in match	0	0	0
Best bowling	6/37	4/55	2/19
Catches/stumpings	6/–	4/–	4/–
- Source: ESPNcricinfo, 26 August 2025

Matthew Edward Thomas Salisbury (born 18 April 1993) is an English cricketer who plays for Leicestershire County Cricket Club in first-class matches as a righthanded batsman who bowls right arm medium-fast pace. After several years on the fringes of the Essex XI, he was released in 2015. After a period out of the professional game, he impressed Hampshire when playing against their second XI, and he played for them in 2017. In July 2018 he was given a two-year contract by Durham having performed well during a loan period. He joined Leicestershire for the 2023 season.
