= Felix Organ =

English cricketer (born 1999)

Personal information
- Full name: Felix Spencer Organ
- Born: 2 June 1999 (age 27); Sydney, New South Wales, Australia
- Batting: Right-handed
- Bowling: Right-arm off break
- Role: All-rounder

Domestic team information
- Years: Team
- 2017–present: Hampshire (squad no. 3)
- First-class debut: 12 September 2017 Hampshire v Middlesex
- List A debut: 7 February 2018 Hampshire v Windward Islands

Career statistics
Competition	FC	LA	T20
Matches	63	44	5
Runs scored	2,262	719	24
Batting average	23.56	25.67	6.00
100s/50s	4/9	0/4	0/0
Top score	118	79	9
Balls bowled	4,934	1,666	66
Wickets	80	24	3
Bowling average	34.42	59.16	25.00
5 wickets in innings	3	0	0
10 wickets in match	0	0	0
Best bowling	6/67	3/39	2/21
Catches/stumpings	28/–	18/–	1/–
- Source: Cricinfo, 26 September 2026

Felix Spencer Organ (born 2 June 1999) is an Australian-born English cricketer. He made his first-class debut for Hampshire in the 2017 County Championship on 13 September 2017. He made his List A debut for Hampshire in the 2017–18 Regional Super50 on 7 February 2018. He made his Twenty20 debut on 3 September 2020, for Hampshire in the 2020 t20 Blast.
