= Ryan Stevenson (cricketer) =

English cricketer

Personal information
- Full name: Ryan Anthony Stevenson
- Born: 2 April 1992 (age 34); Torquay, Devon, England
- Batting: Right-handed
- Bowling: Right-arm fast-medium

Domestic team information
- Years: Team
- 2015–2016: Devon
- 2015–2021: Hampshire (squad no. 47)

Career statistics
Competition	FC	LA	T20
Matches	7	3	22
Runs scored	124	0	62
Batting average	20.66	0.00	10.33
100s/50s	–/1	–/–	–/–
Top score	51	0	17
Balls bowled	773	120	387
Wickets	9	2	14
Bowling average	51.11	71.00	44.35
5 wickets in innings	–	–	–
10 wickets in match	–	–	–
Best bowling	4/70	1/28	2/28
Catches/stumpings	1/–	–/–	6/–
- Source: Cricinfo, 26 September 2021

Ryan Anthony Stevenson (born 2 April 1992) is an English former cricketer.

Stevenson was born at Torquay in April 1992. He was educated at King Edward VI Community College in Totnes. In the summer of 2015, Stevenson was working on his father's farm setting up his own campsite business while playing minor counties cricket for Devon and club cricket for Torquay Cricket Club when he was spotted by Hampshire director of cricket Giles White, who offered him a trial at Hampshire to play Second XI cricket. He made his debut in first-class cricket for Hampshire against Durham in the 2015 County Championship at Chester-le-Street, with him making three first-class appearances that season. He did not feature in first-class cricket the following season, but did make three List A one-day appearances in the 2016 One-Day Cup, taking two wickets. He also made his Twenty20 debut in the 2016 T20 Blast against Surrey at The Oval. However, he suffered a stress fracture to his back which ruled him out of the remainder of the 2016 season,

Upon his return from injury, Stevenson featured just once in 2017, in a first-class match against Loughborough MCCU. Stevenson was mostly utilised in Twenty20 cricket for Hampshire, making ten appearances in the 2018 T20 Blast and nine in the 2019 T20 Blast. He also made three further first-class appearances to 2020. He played a leading role in Hampshire's Second XI Championship winning team in 2019, being named Hampshire's clubman of the year. Stevenson announced his retirement from professional cricket on 8 October 2021, alongside teammate Brad Taylor. In first-class cricket, he made eight appearances, scoring 124 runs at an average of 20.66; he made one half century, a score of 51. With his right-arm fast-medium bowling, he took 9 wickets at a bowling average of 51.11, with best figures of 4 for 70. In Twenty20 cricket, he took 14 wickets at an average of 44.35, with best figures of 2 for 28. In 2019, he began studying for an online diploma in farm management.
