= Brad Taylor =

English cricketer (born 1997)

Personal information
- Full name: Bradley Jacob Taylor
- Born: 14 March 1997 (age 29); Winchester, Hampshire, England
- Batting: Right-handed
- Bowling: Right-arm off break

Domestic team information
- Years: Team
- 2013–2019: Hampshire (squad no. 93)

Career statistics
Competition	FC	LA	T20
Matches	6	18	8
Runs scored	133	355	23
Batting average	19.00	35.50	7.66
100s/50s	–/–	–/3	–/–
Top score	36	69	9*
Balls bowled	798	852	104
Wickets	13	15	4
Bowling average	41.84	44.06	32.00
5 wickets in innings	–	–	–
10 wickets in match	–	–	–
Best bowling	4/64	4/26	2/20
Catches/stumpings	2/–	7/–	3/–
- Source: Cricinfo, 30 September 2019

Bradley Jacob Taylor (born 14 March 1997) is an English former cricketer.

Taylor was born at Winchester in March 1997. He was educated at Eggar's School in Alton, Hampshire. A product of Hampshire's youth development programme, Taylor made his debut at the age of 16 for Hampshire in a List A one-day match against Bangladesh A at the Rose Bowl in 2013, becoming the youngest player to appear for the club in 135 years. Shortly after, he made his debut in first-class cricket against Lancashire at Southport in the 2013 County Championship. He took the wicket of Luis Reece with his third ball in Lancashire's second innings, becoming the youngest player in 146 years to take a first-class wicket for Hampshire. The following season, he made his Twenty20 debut for Hampshire against Sussex in the T20 Blast. He secured a contract at Hampshire in 2015. Taylor played for Hampshire until 2018, making eight first-class, eighteen one-day, and eight Twenty20 appearances. An all-rounder who bowled off break, Taylor scored 133 runs in first-class cricket, whilst with the ball he took 13 wickets at an average of 41.84 and best figures of 4 for 64. In one-day cricket, he scored 355 runs at a batting average of 35.50; he made three half centuries, with a highest score of 69. With the ball, he took 15 wickets at an average of 44.06, with best figures of 4 for 26. In Twenty20 cricket, he only scored 23 runs from four innings, in addition to taking four wickets. Having not featured for Hampshire since the 2019 season, with his 2020 season interrupted by injury, Taylor announced his retirement from professional cricket at the end of the 2021 season, alongside teammate Ryan Stevenson.

Taylor represented the England Under-19 cricket team from 2014 to 2016, making three Youth Test and 22 Youth One Day International appearances. In December 2015, he was named as captain in England's squad for the 2016 Under-19 Cricket World Cup.

== External list ==
- Brad Taylor at Cricinfo
