= Adam Wheater =

English cricketer

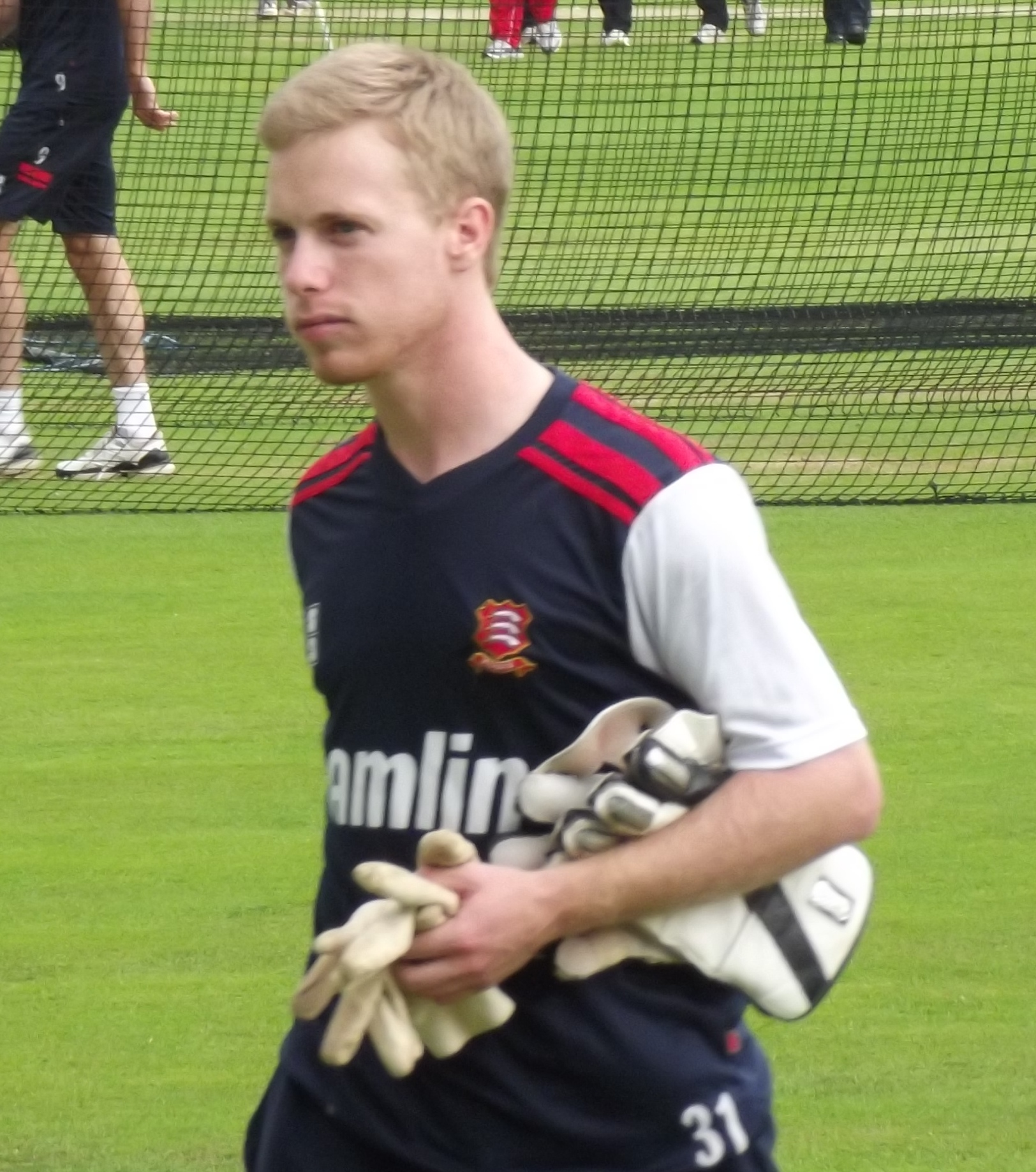
- Wheater pictured in 2011

Personal information
- Full name: Adam Jack Aubrey Wheater
- Born: 13 February 1990 (age 36); Leytonstone, England
- Nickname: Wheats
- Batting: Right-handed
- Role: Wicket-keeper

Domestic team information
- Years: Team
- 2008–2012: Essex (squad no. 31)
- 2010: Cambridge MCCU
- 2010/11–2011/12: Matabeleland Tuskers
- 2011/12: Badureliya Sports Club
- 2012/13: Northern Districts
- 2013–2016: Hampshire (squad no. 31)
- 2016: → Essex (on loan)
- 2017–2022: Essex
- FC debut: 12 April 2008 Essex v Cambridge UCCE
- Last FC: 28 April 2022 Essex v Northants
- LA debut: 25 June 2010 Essex v Northants
- Last LA: 16 August 2021 Essex v Glamorgan

Career statistics
Competition	FC	LA	T20
Matches	162	89	129
Runs scored	7,216	1,924	1,736
Batting average	35.20	28.71	19.28
100s/50s	12/39	2/11	0/4
Top score	204*	135	78
Balls bowled	24	–	–
Wickets	1	–	–
Bowling average	86.00	–	–
5 wickets in innings	0	–	–
10 wickets in match	0	–	–
Best bowling	1/86	–	–
Catches/stumpings	284/21	51/14	51/29
- Source: CricInfo, 2 October 2022

Adam Jack Aubrey Wheater (born 13 February 1990) is an English former first-class cricketer who played for Essex County Cricket Club. He was a right-handed batsman who played as a wicket-keeper.

== Career ==
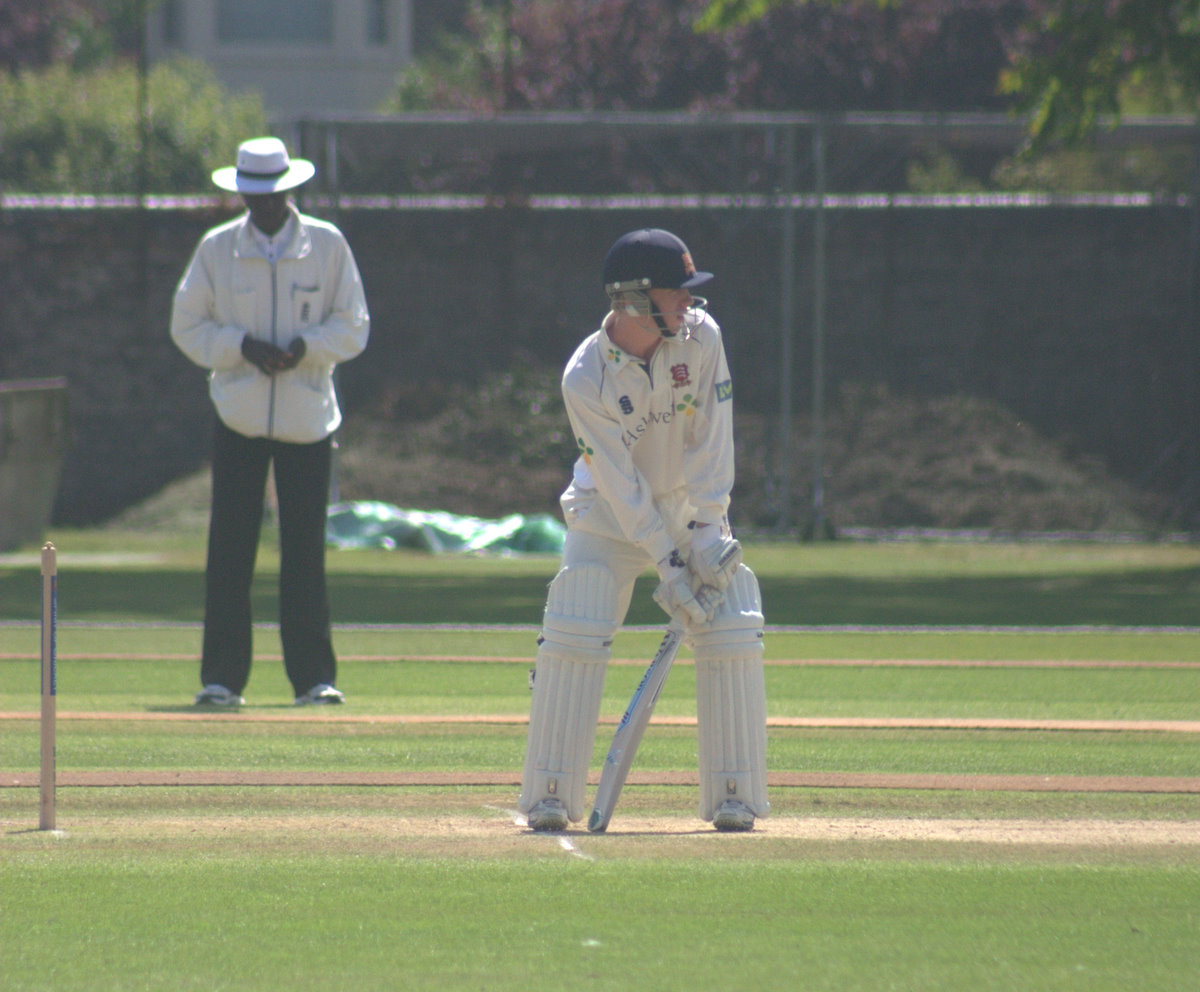
Wheater batting at Fenner's

Wheater was born at Leytonstone in 1990 and educated at Millfield School and at Anglia Ruskin University. He made two appearances in the non-first-class Pro ARCH Trophy in March 2008 against the United Arab Emirates, and made his first-class debut for Essex against Cambridge UCCE the following month.

Wheater spent the first few seasons of his professional career at Essex as understudy to James Foster.

Wheater spent the winter of 2010/11 playing for Zimbabwean franchise Matabeleland Tuskers. He made his maiden first-class century for the Tuskers during his spell. On his return, he was picked as a specialist batsman twice in CB40 games for Essex with Foster in the same team. Wheater fielded at slip or point while Foster, being the senior and superior gloveman, kept wicket.

Frustrated with his lack of wicket-keeping opportunities at Essex, he bought himself out of his contract and moved to Hampshire. There he had a new battle for the gloves, as Michael Bates was a highly rated keeper. Wheater once again found himself sometimes playing as a specialist batsman. After a spell as first-choice wicket-keeper he once again found himself in a battle, this time with Lewis McManus. He then returned to Essex, even though James Foster was still there. He was only sure of his position as first-choice keeper once Foster retired at the end of the 2018 season.

In May 2022, Essex County Cricket Club announced that Wheater would retire after the 2022 season.
