= Tom Alsop =

English cricketer

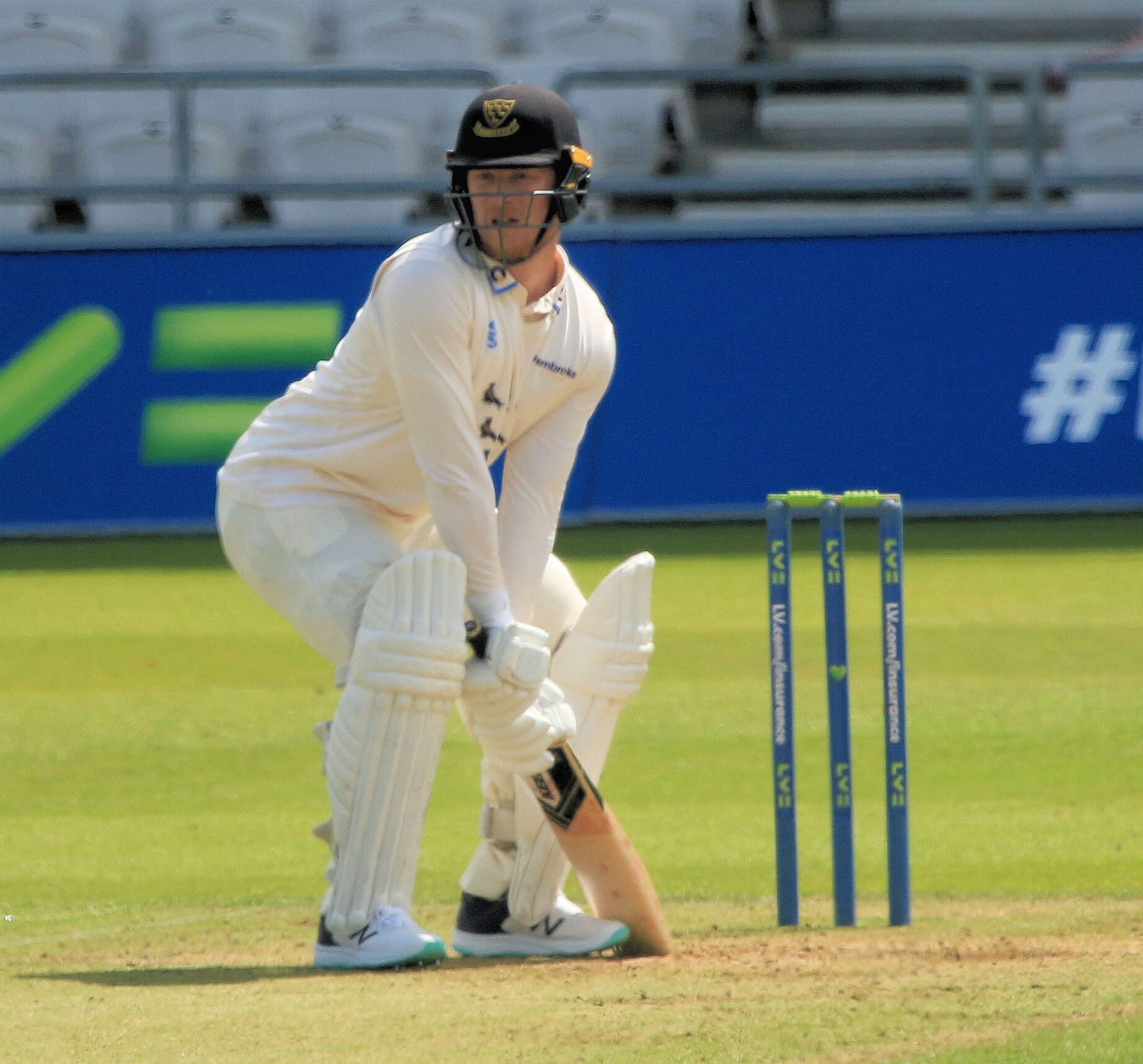
- Alsop in 2023

Personal information
- Full name: Thomas Philip Alsop
- Born: 26 November 1995 (age 30) (Note: Date of birth listed as 26 November on CricketArchive and 27 November on ESPNcricinfo); High Wycombe, Buckinghamshire, England
- Batting: Left-handed
- Bowling: Slow left-arm orthodox
- Role: Wicket-keeper-batter

Domestic team information
- Years: Team
- 2013: Wiltshire
- 2014–2022: Hampshire (squad no. 9)
- 2022: → Sussex (loan) (squad no. 45)
- 2023–2026: Sussex (squad no. 45)
- 2024–2025: Trent Rockets
- 2024/25−present: Brisbane Heat
- 2025: Gulf Giants
- 2026: Sunrisers Leeds
- FC debut: 15 September 2014 Hampshire v Kent
- LA debut: 31 July 2014 Hampshire v Gloucestershire

Career statistics
Competition	FC	LA	T20
Matches	118	73	120
Runs scored	5,683	2,407	2,521
Batting average	31.22	35.92	26.81
100s/50s	10/34	6/12	0/14
Top score	182*	189*	87*
Balls bowled	167	–	6
Wickets	3	–	0
Bowling average	44.66	–	–
5 wickets in innings	0	–	–
10 wickets in match	0	–	–
Best bowling	2/59	–	–
Catches/stumpings	136/0	47/6	45/5
- Source: ESPNcricinfo, 15 August 2026

Thomas Philip Alsop (born 26 November 1995) is an English first-class cricketer. Born in High Wycombe, Buckinghamshire, Alsop is a left-handed batsman who plays as a wicket-keeper, and plays for Gloucestershire.

== Career ==
Tipped for a bright future and a big talent, Alsop was educated at Lavington School. Alsop has played for the Hampshire Cricket Academy in the Southern Premier Cricket League since 2010; during this time Alsop has finished within the top three averages of the league on more than one occasion. In the 2014 season he finished with the highest average in the league, 86.71, scoring 609 runs in just nine innings. In January 2013 he was called up to the England Under-19 following an injury to captain Shiv Thakor, playing four Youth One Day Internationals against South Africa Under-19s during the tour. In May 2013, he played two Minor Counties Trophy matches for Wiltshire against Lincolnshire and Suffolk. In that same month he was required as a substitute wicket-keeper for Hampshire in their Yorkshire Bank 40 match against Lancashire following an injury during the warm-up to Adam Wheater. (Note: Alsop deputised as a substitute for Wheater until the arrival of Michael Bates, therefore this appearance does not count toward his overall List A statistics) During this YB40 game Alsop took a smart catch behind the stumps to dismiss Croft. For the start of the 2014 season, Alsop was awarded a development contract with Hampshire. This was a result of impressing against a strong Surrey attack in a pre-season friendly. Later in the season he made his senior debut in a List A match against Gloucestershire. The following day he made his Youth Test debut for England Under-19s against South Africa Under-19s, having been called up to the under-19 Test squad earlier in July. Alsop went on to impress immensely with the bat during the summer series against South Africa scoring 107 off 83 balls at Trent bridge, and then went on to score a half century the next day.

Alsop is the 528th player to have played for Hampshire and on 15 September 2014 he made his first-class debut against Kent at the Ageas Bowl. He was also a member of the 2014 LV county championship division two winning side in Cardiff.

At the end of the 2016 season, Alsop was selected for the upcoming England Lions tour to the UAE and Sri Lanka in the new year. In Sri Lanka he shared a record partnership with Daniel Bell-Drummond in the fourth ODI.

In 2018 Tom Alsop was a key player in Hampshire's success in the Royal London One day cup, he went on to score 72 in the final becoming the youngest Lord's final half centurion. The following year in 2019 Alsop helped Hampshire reach another Lord's final.

At the end of the 2021 domestic season Tom Alsop was awarded his county cap by Hampshire CCC.

In March 2022, Alsop was loaned to Sussex for the 2022 season and later signed a permanent contract with the team in early June.

Alsop played for the Brisbane Heat as an overseas draft pick in the Australian Twenty20 Big Bash League during the 2024-25 season. He made his playing debut on 6 January 2025.

After his tournament with Brisbane Heat, Alsop was signed by the Gulf Giants in the ILT20 league. He was man of the match against Sharjah Warriorz for his match winning innings of 85.

On 27;July 2026, it was announced that Alsop had agreed to move from Sussex to Gloucestershire on a three-year contract beginning at the end of that year's county season.
