= Calvin Dickinson =

South African-born English cricketer

Personal information
- Full name: Calvin Miles Dickinson
- Born: 3 November 1996 (age 30); Durban, KwaZulu-Natal, South Africa
- Batting: Right-handed
- Role: Wicket-keeper

Domestic team information
- Years: Team
- 2016: Oxford MCCU
- 2017–2018: Hampshire (squad no. 21)

Career statistics
Competition	FC	LA	T20
Matches	4	6	6
Runs scored	211	45	103
Batting average	35.16	9.00	17.16
100s/50s	–/2	–/–	–/1
Top score	99	21	51
Catches/stumpings	4/–	4/–	4/2
- Source: Cricinfo, 23 August 2018

Calvin Miles Dickinson (born 3 November 1996) is a South African-born English former cricketer who played for Hampshire.

Dickinson was born in Durban in November 1996. He moved to England with his parents, who settled on the Isle of Wight. There he was educated at Ryde School, before his parents moved to Oxfordshire. There, his education continued at St Edward's School in Oxford, where he played for and captained the school cricket team. In May 2015, he made the highest individual score in the school's 150–year history, when he made 181 against The Oratory School. From there, he matriculated to Oxford Brookes University. While studying at Oxford Brookes, Dickinson made his debut in first-class cricket as a wicket-keeper for Oxford MCCU in 2016, making two appearances against Worcestershire and Northamptonshire at Oxford. Following the end of the 2016 season, he was awarded a scholarship by Hampshire, with Dickinson returning to South Africa over the winter to be coached by Dale Benkenstein.

He made his debut for Hampshire in June 2017, in a first-class match against South Africa A at the Rose Bowl. On debut, he scored 99 runs in Hampshire's first innings, before he was dismissed by Theunis de Bruyn. Later in the season, he made an appearance in the County Championship against Middlesex at Uxbridge. He made his Twenty20 debut in the 2017 NatWest t20 Blast against Glamorgan, with him making five appearances in the competition; in his second match against Kent, he struck a 24-ball 51 opening the batting alongside James Vince, who made 57 runs. At the end of the 2017 season, he was handed a one-year contract extension. In February 2018, he was part of the Hampshire team which took part in the 2017–18 Regional Super50 in the West Indies, making six List A one-day appearances in the competition. After making just a single Twenty20 appearance in 2018, Dickinson was released by Hampshire at the end of the season, alongside Asher Hart and Chris Sole.
