= Gareth Berg =

English-Italian cricketer

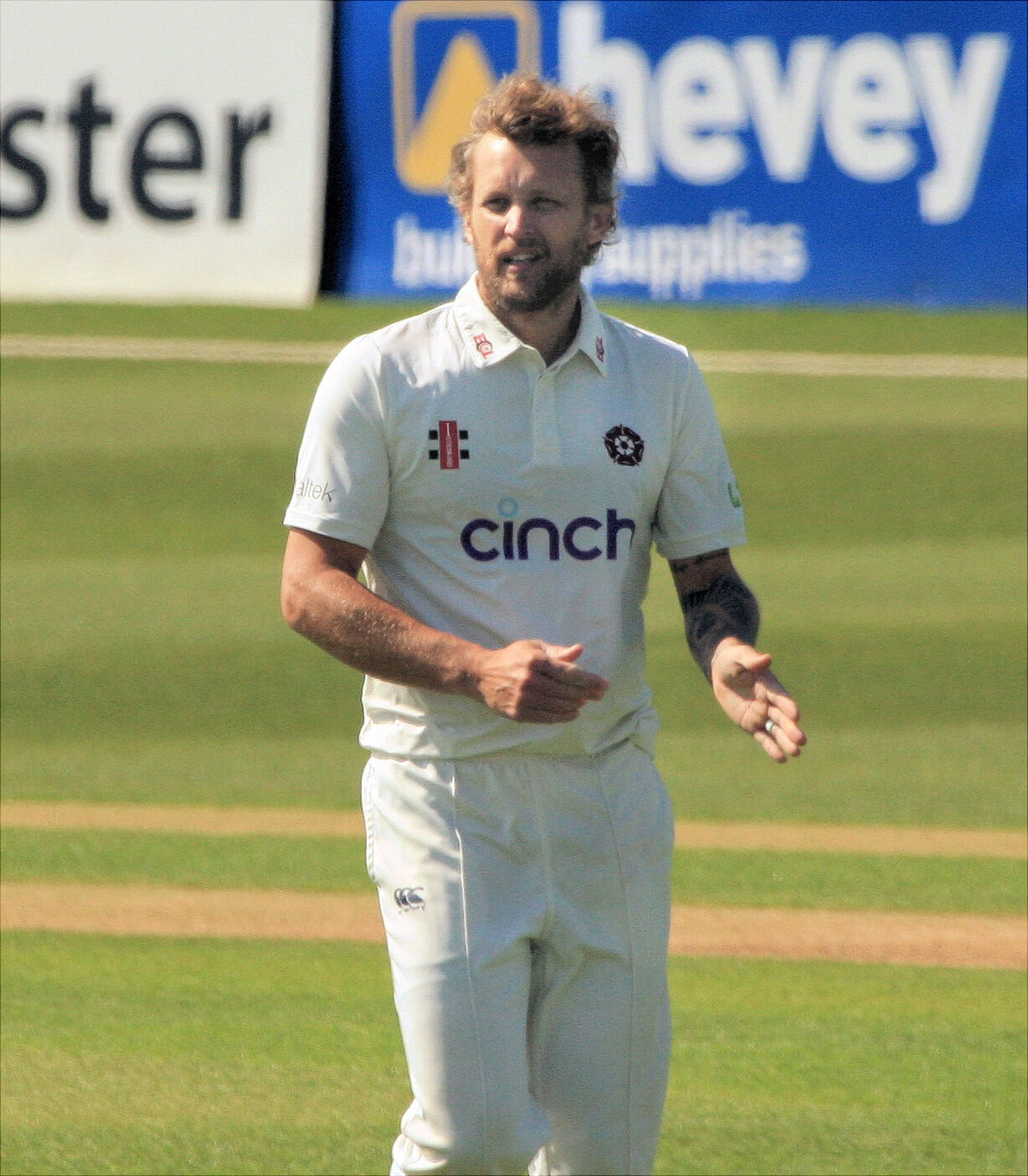
- Berg in 2022

Personal information
- Full name: Gareth Kyle Berg
- Born: 18 January 1981 (age 45); Cape Town, Cape Province, South Africa
- Nickname: Fossil, Batman, Ice, Bergy, The Iceberg
- Height: 6 ft 0 in (1.83 m)
- Batting: Right-handed
- Bowling: Right-arm medium-fast
- Role: All-rounder

International information
- National side: Italy (2012–2023)
- T20I debut (cap 16): 15 October 2021 v Denmark
- Last T20I: 20 July 2023 v Ireland

Domestic team information
- Years: Team
- 2001/02–2002/03: Western Province B
- 2004: Northamptonshire
- 2007–2014: Middlesex
- 2015–2019: Hampshire (squad no. 13)
- 2019: → Northamptonshire (on loan)
- 2020–2023: Northamptonshire

Head coaching information
- Years: Team
- 2020–present: Italy

Career statistics
| Competition | T20I | FC | LA | T20 |
|---|---|---|---|---|
| Matches | 19 | 152 | 116 | 113 |
| Runs scored | 153 | 5,565 | 1,617 | 1,236 |
| Batting average | 19.12 | 28.10 | 22.15 | 21.31 |
| 100s/50s | 0/0 | 2/31 | 0/7 | 0/3 |
| Top score | 39* | 130* | 75 | 90 |
| Balls bowled | 318 | 20,133 | 4,266 | 1,939 |
| Wickets | 20 | 321 | 124 | 94 |
| Bowling average | 16.45 | 31.57 | 28.87 | 26.51 |
| 5 wickets in innings | 0 | 7 | 2 | 0 |
| 10 wickets in match | 0 | 0 | 0 | 0 |
| Best bowling | 4/14 | 6/56 | 5/26 | 4/14 |
| Catches/stumpings | 6/– | 75/– | 44/– | 30/– |
- Source: CricInfo, 25 August 2024

Gareth Kyle Berg (born 18 January 1981) is a South African-born English-Italian cricketer who last played domestic cricket for Northamptonshire County Cricket Club. Born in South Africa, he attended Edgemead Primary School and then SACS (South African College School) . He is not considered a Kolpak player, and is qualified by residency for England as well as holding an Italian passport. In January 2021, Berg was named as the head coach of the Italian cricket team and still continues to play for them.

== Career ==
Berg's career began at Western Province where he appeared in a handful of one day matches, before moving to England where he signed with Northamptonshire, playing second XI cricket for the county. He signed with Middlesex in 2007, again playing in the second XI before breaking into the first team in 2008, making his List A debut against Surrey at the Oval and his First Class debut a few days later at Lord's against Glamorgan. He received his county cap in 2010.

He played for Italy in the 2012 ICC World Twenty20 qualifiers. In May 2019, he was named in Italy's squad for the Regional Finals of the 2018–19 ICC T20 World Cup Europe Qualifier tournament in Guernsey.

On 30 August 2019, it was confirmed that Berg would join Northamptonshire on loan for the remainder of the 2019 season, ahead of a permanent move from 2020 onwards. In November 2019, he was named in Italy's squad for the Cricket World Cup Challenge League B tournament in Oman. In September 2021, he was named as the captain of Italy's Twenty20 International (T20I) squad for the Regional Final of the 2021 ICC Men's T20 World Cup Europe Qualifier tournament. He made his T20I debut on 15 October 2021, for Italy against Denmark.

He announced his retirement from professional cricket in September 2023 although he has continued to play for Italy.
