= Lewis McManus =

English cricketer

Personal information
- Full name: Lewis David McManus
- Born: 9 October 1994 (age 32); Poole, Dorset, England
- Batting: Right-handed
- Role: Wicket-keeper

Domestic team information
- Years: Team
- 2013–2022: Hampshire (squad no. 18)
- 2022: → Northamptonshire (on loan) (squad no. 15)
- 2023–present: Northamptonshire (squad no. 15)
- First-class debut: 10 May 2015 Hampshire v Yorkshire
- List A debut: 5 June 2016 Hampshire v Essex

Career statistics
Competition	FC	LA	T20
Matches	115	74	133
Runs scored	4,054	1,363	1,382
Batting average	28.54	24.33	17.71
100s/50s	3/20	1/4	0/3
Top score	168*	107	76
Catches/stumpings	281/26	55/16	89/24
- Source: CricketArchive, 27 September 2026

Lewis David McManus (born 9 October 1994) is an English first-class cricketer. He is a right-handed wicket-keeper batsman.

McManus is a wicketkeeper-batsman from Bournemouth who currently plays for Northamptonshire county cricket club. He came through Hampshire's academy. He was part of the county's Under-17 side that won the 50-over cup in 2011 and performed strongly for Hampshire Academy in the Southern Premier League. An average of 36 in second XI cricket earned him a call-up for the England Under-19s in February 2014 where he was named in the World Cup squad.

McManus made his Hampshire first team debut on 5 May 2014 against Cardiff MCCU. He scored a century in each innings. Many at the match thought that McManus had become the first English player ever in first-class history to score two centuries on his first-class debut, but this match was not granted first-class status. The reason for this is unclear.

McManus made his Hampshire debut against Yorkshire in a County Championship match on 10 May 2015 at Headingley. McManus scored 38 runs in this match, 10 in the first innings before being dismissed by Jack Brooks and 28 in the second innings before being dismissed by Will Rhodes. He though took 4 catches in this match as wicket-keeper, 3 in the first innings of Adam Lyth, Jonny Bairstow and Brooks, and a solitary catch in the second innings of Lyth again as Yorkshire would go on to win by 305 runs.

On 23 October 2019, he signed a one-year contract extension with Hampshire to keep him at the club until at least the end of the 2020 season.
