= List of Hampshire County Cricket Club first-class players =

As of 27 September 2026

This list contains the players who represented Hampshire County Cricket Club in first-class matches from 1864 to the last match against Sussex at the end of the 2026 season. Hampshire till then has been represented by 741 players in first-class cricket.

Hampshire County Cricket Club was founded in 1863. Hampshire county cricket team (pre-1864) formed by earlier organisations, principally the Hambledon Club and dating back to the 18th century, always had first-class status and so the county club was rated accordingly from its foundation in 1864 until 1885. Then, after a nine-year break, it was classified as an official first-class team from 1895 by Marylebone Cricket Club (MCC) and the County Championship clubs.

The club's first match was played in 1864 against Sussex at the Antelope Ground. Led by George Ede, Hampshire lost by 10 wickets. Over the next 21 years, Hampshire played 74 first-class matches, although with little success. Following years of difficult circumstances and poor results to 1885, Hampshire is not rated a first-class team between 1886 and 1894.

Players are listed in order of appearance, where players made their debut in the same match, they are ordered by batting order.

== Key ==
General

- ♠ – Captain
- † – Wicket-keeper
- First – Year of debut for Hampshire
- Last – Year of latest match played for Hampshire
- Mat – Number of matches played for Hampshire

Batting

- Inn – Number of innings batted
- NO – Number of innings not out
- Runs – Runs scored in career
- HS – Highest score
- 100 – Centuries scored
- 50 – Half-centuries scored
- Avg – Runs scored per dismissal
- * – Batsman remained not out

Bowling

- Balls – Balls bowled in career
- Wkt – Wickets taken in career
- BBI – Best bowling in an innings
- BBM – Best bowling in a match
- Ave – Average runs per wicket

Fielding

- Ca – Catches taken
- St – Stumpings effected

== List of players ==
No.	Name	Nationality	First	Last	Mat	Runs	HS	Avg	Balls	Wkt	BBI	Ave	Ca	St
No.	Name	Nationality	First	Last	Mat	Batting			Bowling				Fielding	
1	Charles Lucas	England	1864	1880	14	502	135	20.08	0	0	–	–	5	0
2	John Lord	Australia	1864	1864	1	15	11	15.00	0	0	–	–	0	0
3	Henry Holmes	England	1864	1878	27	692	71	15.04	1,690	22	5/57	29.90	0	0
4	George Ede ♠	England	1864	1869	15	257	52	9.51	52	1	1/22	22.00	0	0
5	Henry Frere †	England	1864	1866	6	92	23	10.22	660	6	2/20	41.33	2	2
6	Charles Ridding	England	1864	1864	2	33	13	8.25	0	0	–	–	0	0
7	Edward Ede, Sr.	England	1864	1870	16	260	49	10.00	464	15	4/79	25.46	6	0
8	William Humphrey	England	1864	1864	4	50	25	7.14	190	4	3/61	25.00	0	0
9	George Ubsdell †	England	1864	1870	15	170	29	6.80	0	0	–	–	4	13
10	Sampson Tubb	England	1864	1867	10	170	24*	12.14	1,926	37	7/32	20.16	5	0
11	George Case	England	1864	1864	2	85	48	28.33	40	0	–	–	0	0
12	W. P. Bailey	England	1864	1864	1	14	10	7.00	0	0	–	–	0	0
13	James Southerton †	England	1864	1867	12	200	44	10.00	2,185	63	7/45	14.15	8	3
14	John Frederick	England	1864	1869	5	171	44	17.10	128	4	4/45	17.25	4	0
15	Henry Maturin	Ireland	1864	1882	9	136	28	9.71	408	6	4/68	30.00	6	0
16	George Mannings	England	1864	1864	1	7	5	3.50	0	0	–	–	1	0
17	Francis Walton	England	1864	1866	3	55	16	11.00	268	6	3/48	27.50	1	0
18	Joshua Spencer-Smith	England	1864	1864	1	20	11	10.00	0	0	–	–	11	0
19	William Whitcher	England	1864	1867	2	27	17*	13.50	48	0	–	–	0	0
20	Edward Bowen	England	1864	1864	1	0	0	0.00	0	0	–	–	0	0
21	Thomas Garnier	England	1864	1864	1	29	23	14.50	0	0	–	–	0	0
22	Edmund Willes	England	1865	1865	1	2	1*	1.00	20	0	–	–	1	0
23	Henry Gale	England	1865	1866	5	144	44	18.00	0	0	–	–	2	0
24	G. Chandler †	England	1865	1865	1	16	16	8.00	0	0	–	–	1	2
25	Henry Style †	England	1865	1865	1	1	1	0.50	0	0	–	–	0	1
26	Henry Plowden	England	1865	1865	1	37	34	18.50	72	2	2/46	23.00	0	0
27	Hon. Frederick Hervey-Bathurst	England	1865	1866	2	53	30	17.66	0	0	–	–	0	0
28	Philip Thresher	England	1865	1869	5	93	47*	11.62	36	1	1/19	19.00	0	0
29	Edward Hemsted	England	1866	1869	7	204	39	17.00	160	8	5/14	12.25	3	0
30	Robert Tayler	England	1866	1866	2	68	42	17.00	0	0	–	–	0	0
31	Anthony Henley	England	1866	1866	1	16	9	8.00	0	0	–	–	0	0
32	Orlando Spencer-Smith	England	1866	1866	1	53	39	26.50	0	0	–	–	0	0
33	William Lipscomb	England	1866	1867	4	99	34	14.14	32	0	–	–	0	0
34	John May	England	1867	1870	4	71	28	11.83	336	6	4/80	27.50	0	0
35	Charles Young	England	1867	1885	38	717	48	11.95	7,381	149	7/19	21.86	35	0
36	Henry Soames	England	1867	1867	1	54	52	27.00	0	0	–	–	0	0
37	William Martin	England	1867	1867	1	2	1	1.00	0	0	–	–	0	0
38	George Carter	England	1869	1878	12	274	34	11.91	68	1	1/11	12.00	4	0
39	Herbert Stewart †	England	1869	1869	1	1	1	0.50	0	0	–	–	1	0
40	Henry Tate	England	1869	1885	29	499	61*	11.08	4,814	96	6/51	18.16	26	0
41	Charles Martin	England	1869	1870	4	9	3	1.28	476	9	3/38	18.66	3	0
42	Henry Misselbrook	England	1869	1869	1	3	2	1.50	168	6	4/18	6.50	0	0
43	William Kendle	England	1869	1878	5	66	29	7.33	0	0	–	–	1	0
44	Okeover Longcroft †	England	1869	1870	2	28	12	7.00	103	8	3/15	9.37	1	1
45	William Stewart †	England	1869	1878	2	10	6	3.33	0	0	–	–	3	1
46	Alfred Seymour	England	1870	1870	1	2	2	1.00	0	0	–	–	0	0
47	Charles Eccles	England	1870	1875	2	36	23	9.00	64	0	–	–	0	0
48	Arthur Wood ♠†	England	1870	1885	28	849	82	18.45	28	0	–	–	23	5
49	Thomas Wilson	England	1870	1870	2	15	9	3.75	0	0	–	–	0	1
50	Frederick Tate	England	1870	1876	5	50	18*	10.00	310	13	6/63	11.30	5	0
51	Algernon Lushington	England	1870	1877	3	48	21	8.00	176	3	2/48	32.66	1	0
52	Lionel Hervey-Bathurst †	England	1875	1875	2	30	14	7.50	16	0	–	–	1	1
53	Clement Booth ♠	England	1875	1880	20	620	77	17.71	312	2	1/13	71.50	8	0
54	Thomas Fox	England	1875	1875	2	10	7	2.50	28	0	–	–	1	0
55	Reginald Hargreaves	England	1875	1885	12	307	38*	15.35	536	14	4/55	26.85	7	0
56	Egerton Cecil	England	1875	1875	2	36	23	9.00	64	0	–	–	0	0
57	Frederick Jackman	England	1875	1877	2	26	16	13.00	52	1	1/21	42.00	0	0
58	William Paris	England	1875	1881	6	81	51*	8.10	116	5	3/28	10.40	0	0
59	John Galpin	England	1875	1880	7	100	27	11.11	1,361	28	6/68	16.50	4	0
60	James Crowdy	England	1875	1884	7	112	21	9.33	28	1	1/31	31.00	0	0
61	Edward Haygarth	England	1875	1875	1	10	6	5.00	0	0	–	–	0	0
62	Rowland Prothero	England	1875	1883	4	57	24	11.40	160	2	1/27	48.00	4	0
63	Dunbar Duncan	England	1875	1885	17	581	87*	22.34	60	3	1/1	6.00	4	0
64	George Longman †	England	1875	1885	27	856	78	17.46	256	3	1/1	54.33	20	3
65	Arthur Ridley	England	1875	1878	10	558	104	29.36	2,258	68	7/46	13.26	4	0
66	Joseph Lynn	England	1875	1875	1	4	4*	4.00	84	2	2/25	17.00	1	0
67	George Greenfield	England	1875	1875	1	0	0	0.00	44	0	–	–	0	0
68	Henry Dutton	England	1875	1875	1	7	7*	–	36	0	–	–	0	0
69	Granville Greenwood	England	1875	1875	1	2	1	1.00	0	0	–	–	1	0
70	Robert Henley	England	1875	1875	1	14	14	14.00	12	0	–	–	0	0
71	Hector Hyslop †	England	1876	1877	7	106	34	8.83	72	2	2/12	15.50	6	11
72	Arthur Jeffreys †	England	1876	1878	10	203	51	11.94	0	0	–	–	3	0
73	Matthew Wood	England	1876	1876	1	0	0	0.00	0	0	–	–	0	0
74	Francis Foster	England	1876	1876	1	12	10	6.00	0	0	–	–	1	0
75	Russell Bencraft ♠	England	1876	1896	44	908	62*	16.65	355	5	2/15	37.00	32	0
76	William Wild	England	1877	1877	1	10	8	10.00	24	0	–	–	0	0
77	George Cull	England	1877	1877	2	14	7	3.50	0	0	–	–	1	0
78	William Baldock	England	1877	1882	7	155	40	12.91	108	2	1/10	24.00	4	0
79	Harry Baldwin	England	1877	1905	150	1,863	55*	10.64	34,045	580	8/74	24.71	54	0
80	Walter Powys	England	1877	1878	2	8	5*	4.00	160	2	1/26	42.00	0	0
81	James Tuck †	England	1877	1882	9	176	32*	11.73	76	2	1/11	18.00	4	0
82	Lindsay Bury	England	1877	1877	1	15	15	7.50	36	1	1/23	23.00	1	0
83	John Moberly	England	1877	1877	1	31	27	15.50	0	0	–	–	0	0
84	Frederick Jellicoe	England	1877	1880	4	37	12	9.25	712	23	7/23	10.56	3	0
85	John Ward	England	1877	1877	1	14	11	7.00	152	0	–	–	0	0
86	Teddy Wynyard ♠†	England	1878	1908	71	4,322	268	34.57	2,861	49	6/63	31.61	89	3
87	Charles Leat †	England	1878	1885	16	323	63	11.53	105	2	2/10	24.50	21	1
88	Charles Gunner	England	1878	1878	1	0	0	–	0	0	–	–	1	0
89	Arthur Duncan	England	1878	1883	2	28	26	7.00	0	0	–	–	0	0
90	William Judd	England	1878	1878	1	8	7	4.00	164	1	1/22	50.00	0	0
91	Robert Raynbird	England	1878	1878	1	0	0	0.00	12	0	–	–	0	0
92	Walter Wheeler	England	1878	1880	3	35	15	7.00	348	6	6/133	31.00	1	0
93	Henry Harris	England	1880	1880	3	53	28	10.60	152	0	–	–	1	0
94	Sir Francis Lacey ♠	England	1880	1897	33	2,028	211	39.76	1,867	45	7/149	20.93	26	0
95	Arthur Andrews †	England	1880	1885	7	236	62*	21.45	24	0	–	–	6	2
96	Charles Seymour	England	1880	1885	15	481	77*	18.50	0	0	–	–	12	0
97	Ernest Hall †	England	1880	1885	11	198	22	10.42	152	0	–	–	11	3
98	Lothian Bonham-Carter ♠	England	1880	1885	8	260	67	17.33	92	2	2/22	31.50	5	0
99	Tom Wild	England	1880	1880	2	40	25	13.33	0	0	–	–	0	0
100	Edward Michell	England	1880	1880	1	7	7	7.00	0	0	–	–	1	0
101	James Acton	England	1880	1882	2	41	31	13.66	8	0	–	–	0	0
102	Frederick Blundell	England	1880	1880	1	2	2	2.00	68	2	2/22	11.00	1	0
103	Walter Raynbird	England	1880	1881	2	25	13	8.33	28	0	–	–	0	0
104	Henry Meaden	England	1881	1881	3	20	9*	4.00	0	0	–	–	2	0
105	Francis Lipscomb	England	1881	1882	3	92	53	18.40	152	2	2/46	51.50	0	0
106	Hon. Henry Mildmay	England	1881	1884	7	137	26	11.41	104	1	1/26	51.00	4	0
107	Edward Crofton	England	1881	1881	3	32	23	6.40	84	1	1/21	42.00	0	0
108	Cecil Currie	England	1881	1885	16	284	32	13.52	2,817	56	8/57	21.87	6	0
109	James Kaye †	England	1881	1881	1	14	11	7.00	0	0	–	–	0	1
110	Anthony Abdy	England	1881	1881	1	30	23	15.00	0	0	–	–	0	0
111	Henry Kay	England	1882	1882	2	0	0	0.00	36	0	–	–	0	0
112	Henry Calder	England	1882	1885	5	128	44	14.22	270	5	3/24	23.60	3	0
113	H.F. Lowe	England	1882	1882	1	0	0	0.00	0	0	–	–	0	0
114	Walter Parsons	England	1882	1882	2	31	12*	15.50	124	1	1/23	72.00	1	0
115	Henry Bedford	England	1882	1882	1	3	3	3.00	16	1	1/5	5.00	0	0
116	James King	England	1882	1882	1	13	9	6.50	132	5	4/64	18.60	1	0
117	George Gutteres	England	1882	1882	1	52	28	26.00	0	0	–	–	3	0
118	George Underdown	England	1882	1885	9	227	63	14.18	124	1	1/15	80.00	0	0
119	Alfred Watts	England	1882	1882	2	26	11	8.66	92	2	1/9	21.00	0	0
120	Herbert Armstrong	England	1882	1885	23	502	68	14.34	3,601	68	7/33	20.23	11	0
121	Robert Thorne	England	1883	1883	2	9	6	2.25	0	0	–	–	0	0
122	Henry Davies	Wales	1883	1883	1	45	42	22.50	0	0	–	–	0	0
123	William Dible	England	1883	1885	25	495	68	13.37	4,949	90	7/60	22.12	18	0
124	Henry Murgatroyd	England	1883	1883	1	2	1*	2.00	24	0	–	–	0	0
125	Edwin Hazelton	England	1883	1883	3	83	50	16.60	0	0	–	–	0	0
126	Edward Whalley-Tooker	England	1883	1885	2	14	7	3.50	0	0	–	–	0	0
127	Allan Heath	England	1883	1885	7	132	42	9.42	45	2	2/28	14.00	2	0
129	Richard Bateman	England	1883	1883	1	18	14*	18.00	0	0	–	–	0	0
130	James Fellowes ♠	England	1883	1885	11	186	26	12.40	817	11	3/38	35.72	17	0
131	Ernest Powell	England	1884	1885	11	759	140	34.94	0	0	–	–	9	0
132	Nesbit Wallace	Canada	1884	1884	2	57	25	14.25	0	0	–	–	1	0
133	H.F. Russell	England	1884	1884	1	11	10	5.50	0	0	–	–	0	0
134	James Spens	England	1884	1899	10	546	118*	28.73	15	0	–	–	5	0
135	Edgar Sheldrake	England	1884	1885	3	52	20	10.40	160	1	1/41	78.00	0	0
136	James Hargreaves	England	1884	1885	2	15	14	3.75	0	0	–	–	0	0
137	James Darby	England	1884	1897	4	78	35	13.00	70	0	–	–	1	0
138	Alfred Ridley	England	1884	1885	2	43	41	10.75	76	2	2/30	17.50	1	0
139	Walter Feltham	England	1884	1884	3	1	1	0.25	541	12	4/54	21.16	1	0
140	Arthur Richards	England	1884	1904	4	104	47	17.33	304	3	3/45	37.33	2	0
141	Horatio Dumbleton	England	1884	1884	1	16	9	8.00	8	0	–	–	0	0
142	Francis Pember	England	1885	1885	2	49	30	12.25	0	0	–	–	2	0
143	Frank Walkinshaw †	England	1885	1885	3	15	11	3.00	0	0	–	–	4	1
144	Edward Barrett	England	1885	1885	2	22	13*	11.00	48	0	–	–	1	0
145	George Smoker	England	1885	1885	2	17	13	5.66	0	0	–	–	2	0
146	Edmund Crofts	England	1885	1885	1	5	3	2.50	0	0	–	–	0	0
147	H.W. Wright	England	1885	1885	1	12	12	6.00	140	1	1/70	70.00	1	0
148	Frederick Willoughby	England	1885	1885	8	60	19	5.00	1,330	25	4/39	22.56	5	0
149	Stanley Pearce	England	1885	1885	1	18	18	9.00	0	0	–	–	0	0
150	Alfred Pink	England	1885	1885	1	54	39	27.00	36	1	1/15	15.00	0	0
151	Henry Bethune	England	1885	1897	2	26	9	8.66	60	1	1/27	27.00	1	0
152	Valentine Simpson	England	1885	1885	1	10	7	5.00	0	0	–	–	2	0
153	Arthur Watson	England	1885	1885	1	22	22	11.00	0	0	–	–	0	0
154	Alfred Evans	England	1885	1885	3	82	33	13.66	477	10	4/47	17.80	2	0
155	Hon. Henry Forster	England	1885	1895	5	76	28	9.50	178	5	3/22	16.00	4	0
156	Hon. Henry Mordaunt	England	1885	1885	1	0	0	0.00	0	0	–	–	0	0
157	Alfred Parvin	England	1885	1885	1	11	11	5.50	0	0	–	–	1	0
158	Charles Robson ♠†	England	1895	1906	129	3,229	101	15.27	186	1	1/40	143.00	165	37
159	Ledger Hill ♠	England	1895	1921	161	8,381	199	30.58	11,950	199	7/36	31.22	110	0
160	Victor Barton	England	1895	1902	143	6,204	205	25.01	9,535	130	6/28	29.37	95	0
161	Herbert Ward	England	1895	1897	33	1,334	113	22.03	1,033	19	4/17	29.10	20	0
162	Francis Bacon ♠	England	1895	1911	75	1,909	110	15.77	217	6	2/23	31.66	34	0
163	Christopher Heseltine	England	1895	1904	52	1,039	77	13.67	5,970	116	7/106	27.45	28	0
164	Thomas Soar	England	1895	1904	101	1,927	95	13.38	16,620	323	8/38	23.82	49	0
165	Charles Barton	England	1895	1896	4	28	22	9.33	310	3	2/66	50.66	0	0
166	Albert Porter	England	1895	1895	1	7	7	7.00	0	0	–	–	1	0
167	William Deane †	England	1895	1895	4	15	8	3.00	0	0	–	–	6	3
168	Francis Quinton	England	1895	1900	45	2,178	178	28.28	1,319	30	5/93	28.50	42	0
169	Reginald Studd	England	1895	1895	3	169	93	28.16	0	0	–	–	2	0
170	Arthur Webb	England	1895	1904	149	5,475	162*	21.72	1,821	22	2/18	46.50	83	0
171	Hon. Evelyn Bradford	England	1895	1905	8	311	102	25.91	743	20	6/28	16.40	5	0
172	Jimmy Wootton	England	1895	1900	24	391	53	12.61	3,797	69	5/37	27.05	13	0
173	David Steele ♠†	England	1895	1906	163	3,418	80	13.89	8,573	135	5/32	34.28	132	5
174	Edward Buckland	England	1895	1895	4	116	73	14.50	516	9	5/30	23.44	4	0
175	James Quinton	England	1895	1899	4	47	22	9.40	65	1	1/14	36.00	4	0
176	Sidney Olivier †	England	1895	1895	1	0	0	0.00	0	0	–	–	3	0
177	Cyril Richards	England	1895	1895	1	48	43	24.00	0	0	–	–	0	0
178	Harold Denham	England	1896	1896	1	8	7	4.00	0	0	–	–	0	0
179	Frederick Kitchener	England	1896	1903	13	80	16	5.00	1,440	28	6/59	22.50	6	0
180	Ernest Sykes †	England	1896	1896	1	5	5*	–	0	0	–	–	0	0
181	George Passmore †	England	1896	1896	1	0	0	0.00	0	0	–	–	2	1
182	Richard Bennett ♠†	England	1896	1899	23	468	47	12.31	0	0	–	–	22	6
183	Albert Pillans	England	1896	1896	3	82	32*	20.50	339	6	2/31	25.16	0	0
184	Basil Hitchcock	England	1896	1896	2	33	21	11.00	0	0	–	–	0	0
185	Edward Lee	England	1896	1909	46	994	54*	14.61	1,247	9	2/0	74.77	26	0
186	Edward Barrett ♠	England	1896	1925	80	3,518	215	32.57	32	0	–	–	34	0
187	Edward Mariner	England	1896	1896	1	0	0	0.00	40	0	–	–	0	0
188	Arthur Delmé-Radcliffe	England	1896	1900	7	190	43	14.61	0	0	–	–	3	0
189	Arthur Luard	England	1897	1897	5	60	18	7.50	0	0	–	–	0	0
190	Charles Ward	England	1897	1901	14	186	30	8.08	183	2	1/17	67.50	3	0
191	Joseph Bower	England	1897	1898	3	14	8	4.66	430	8	4/43	20.75	0	0
192	Billy Light	England	1897	1898	12	101	41	5.94	695	10	3/32	34.30	9	0
193	William Andrew	England	1897	1898	12	312	106	14.85	1,297	23	5/157	27.21	3	0
194	Bernard Brodhurst	England	1897	1897	1	9	9	9.00	35	0	–	–	1	0
195	Robert Poore	South Africa	1898	1906	36	2,819	304	47.77	158	3	1/9	33.33	23	0
196	Bruce Lamb	England	1898	1901	4	29	8	4.14	0	0	–	–	2	0
197	Elisha Light	England	1898	1900	13	168	35	10.50	481	5	2/22	52.60	6	0
198	Edward English	England	1898	1901	18	565	98	18.83	194	1	1/11	101.00	5	0
199	Edwin Lineham	England	1898	1898	1	0	0*	0.00	0	0	–	–	0	0
200	Reginald Fisher	England	1898	1898	1	3	3	3.00	0	0	–	–	0	0
201	William Russell	England	1898	1898	1	7	5	3.50	0	0	–	–	0	0
202	Edward Tate	England	1898	1902	29	256	34*	7.11	3,772	56	8/51	31.03	12	0
203	Edward Sprot ♠	Scotland	1898	1914	267	12,212	147	28.80	3,042	54	5/28	34.37	228	0
204	George Martin	England	1898	1899	4	19	6*	9.50	470	8	3/64	40.12	3	0
205	Herbert Studd	England	1898	1898	4	217	60	31.00	40	0	–	–	3	0
206	Thomas Sutherland	England	1898	1899	9	74	21	14.80	767	11	6/111	40.50	6	0
207	Mark Gravett	England	1899	1900	4	41	17*	6.83	1,001	15	5/50	29.66	4	0
208	Cecil Palmer	England	1899	1907	8	264	64	17.60	0	0	–	–	2	0
209	Charlie Llewellyn	South Africa	1899	1910	196	8,772	216	27.58	33,407	711	8/72	24.66	135	0
210	Frank Harvey †	England	1899	1900	3	20	7	5.00	0	0	–	–	2	1
211	Charles Kendle †	England	1899	1899	2	27	11	9.00	0	0	–	–	2	1
212	Howard Phillips	England	1899	1902	5	53	40	5.88	178	0	–	–	1	0
213	Frederick Leveson-Gower	England	1899	1900	2	45	20	11.25	30	0	–	–	1	0
214	George Harris	England	1899	1899	1	10	10	5.00	0	0	–	–	0	0
215	Edward Newton	England	1900	1900	17	568	69	18.32	0	0	–	–	8	0
216	Harry Redhouse	England	1900	1900	1	4	4	2.00	18	0	–	–	1	0
217	Leslie Gay †	England	1900	1900	9	164	34*	10.25	0	0	–	–	12	2
218	Christopher Gandy	England	1900	1900	2	6	6*	2.00	174	3	2/84	39.00	1	0
219	Hesketh Hesketh-Prichard	England	1900	1913	60	461	36	6.77	10,642	233	8/32	23.45	30	0
220	George Raikes	England	1900	1902	9	409	77	27.26	1,289	25	4/30	30.24	10	0
221	Charles Budden	England	1900	1900	2	35	32*	17.50	168	2	1/30	51.00	0	0
222	George Bull	England	1900	1900	2	12	10	6.00	36	0	–	–	0	0
223	Bertram Evans	England	1900	1909	5	67	18*	11.16	0	0	–	–	2	0
224	Charles Briggs ♠	England	1900	1900	6	158	58	15.80	0	0	–	–	4	0
225	Thomas Page	England	1900	1900	2	77	61*	25.66	240	4	4/115	49.50	3	0
226	Percy Bird	England	1900	1900	1	37	28	18.50	0	0	–	–	0	0
227	Lewis Lodge	England	1900	1900	3	6	4	1.50	12	0	–	–	0	0
228	Frederick Freemantle	England	1900	1900	2	28	26	9.33	120	0	–	–	0	0
229	William Maundrell	England	1900	1900	1	0	0	0.00	0	0	–	–	0	0
230	Jimmy Stone †	England	1900	1914	274	9,167	174	22.30	72	1	1/77	104.00	360	114
231	Walter Humphreys	England	1900	1900	2	17	13*	8.50	273	9	5/71	27.33	1	0
232	Bernhard Bentinck	England	1900	1902	2	26	15	6.50	0	0	–	–	1	0
233	Cecil Allenby	England	1900	1900	1	0	0	0.00	0	0	–	–	0	0
234	John Greig ♠	England	1901	1922	77	4,375	249*	34.17	3,603	64	6/38	32.03	52	0
235	Alan Hotham	Scotland	1901	1901	1	16	11	8.00	6	0	–	–	0	0
236	Henry Smoker	England	1901	1907	31	334	39*	9.54	1,416	33	7/35	22.21	18	0
237	Cecil Bodington	England	1901	1902	10	154	36	11.00	375	9	3/19	31.88	4	0
238	Hubert Greenhill	England	1901	1901	2	15	6	5.00	145	3	3/39	25.66	0	0
239	Alfred Wood	England	1901	1901	1	22	11	11.00	0	0	–	–	1	0
240	Hugh Bignell	England	1901	1902	5	99	49*	14.14	54	0	–	–	2	0
241	Thomas Chignell	England	1901	1904	18	181	29*	10.05	1,858	33	5/68	33.57	11	0
242	Henry Jolliffe	England	1902	1902	1	1	1	0.50	0	0	–	–	1	0
243	Adolphus Sparrow	England	1902	1902	1	1	1	1.00	0	0	–	–	0	0
244	William Evans	England	1902	1910	20	940	115	26.85	2,608	45	7/59	33.13	12	0
245	Alexander Johnston ♠†	England	1902	1919	108	5,442	175	30.74	910	18	4/21	44.72	57	1
246	Alex Bowell ♠†	England	1902	1927	473	18,466	204	24.20	2,979	34	4/20	51.94	260	2
247	Hugh Orr	England	1902	1907	6	59	11*	5.90	514	11	3/34	32.72	2	0
248	Edward Ede	England	1902	1906	14	218	43	12.11	1,850	38	7/72	29.73	10	0
249	William Langford	England	1902	1908	93	1,663	62*	12.99	12,763	215	8/82	26.88	67	0
250	William Harrison	England	1902	1902	1	12	12*	12.00	0	0	–	–	10	0
251	William Jephson ♠†	England	1903	1919	57	1,571	90	16.89	18	1	1/13	13.00	31	1
252	William White ♠	England	1903	1914	61	2,827	160*	27.44	17	0	–	–	34	0
253	Lawrence Black	England	1903	1919	4	36	21	7.20	276	1	1/27	229.00	3	0
254	Ernest Read	England	1903	1903	7	113	44	10.27	0	0	–	–	7	0
255	Edward Frederick	England	1903	1904	5	32	11	6.40	546	9	3/41	36.77	10	0
256	Thomas Dashwood	England	1904	1904	2	34	12	8.50	0	0	–	–	2	0
257	Montague Hayter	England	1904	1904	7	166	82	13.83	0	0	–	–	3	0
258	Robert Manser	England	1904	1904	1	1	1	0.50	0	0	–	–	1	0
259	Septimus Brutton	England	1904	1904	1	22	15	11.00	0	0	–	–	1	0
260	George Williams	England	1904	1904	1	16	15	8.00	0	0	–	–	0	0
261	J. Martin	England	1904	1904	1	66	39	33.00	186	5	4/100	33.20	3	0
262	Frank Nugent †	England	1904	1904	1	0	0	0.00	0	0	–	–	1	0
263	Dudley Evans	England	1904	1911	15	361	64	15.04	2,116	50	6/81	27.56	16	0
264	George Katinakis	England	1904	1905	4	46	16*	9.20	18	0	–	–	1	0
265	Guy Bignell	England	1904	1925	55	1,582	109	20.54	1,404	17	3/67	42.47	22	0
266	Henry Persse	England	1905	1909	51	889	71	11.69	6,993	127	6/64	30.02	40	0
267	Coote Hedley	England	1905	1905	3	69	35	11.50	234	2	1/23	62.50	1	0
268	Victor Norbury	England	1905	1906	11	179	35	10.52	756	7	2/48	75.71	4	0
269	Arthur Byng	England	1905	1905	3	40	21	8.00	36	0	–	–	0	0
270	Francis Wyatt	England	1905	1919	11	73	14*	5.61	1,927	44	6/31	21.25	11	0
271	Phil Mead ♠	England	1905	1936	700	48,892	280*	48.84	17,893	266	7/18	34.78	633	0
272	Stanley Toyne	England	1905	1905	1	10	9	5.00	0	0	–	–	1	0
273	Thomas Sheppard	England	1905	1905	1	17	17	17.00	0	0	–	–	0	0
274	Gordon Belcher	England	1905	1905	1	0	0	0.00	6	0	–	–	0	0
275	Billy Gladdon	England	1905	1905	1	1	1	0.50	168	0	–	–	0	0
276	John Badcock	England	1906	1908	63	1,199	74	14.44	9,157	212	8/44	25.53	30	0
277	Frank Hopkins	England	1906	1911	3	12	6*	4.00	318	4	2/66	43.75	0	0
278	Robert Mornement	England	1906	1906	3	41	19	8.20	294	6	3/62	28.50	3	0
279	Jack Newman	England	1906	1930	506	13,904	166*	20.90	96,323	1,946	9/131	24.82	295	0
280	John Gunner	England	1906	1907	6	65	32	8.12	0	0	–	–	4	0
281	Edward Tolfree	England	1906	1919	5	53	22*	8.83	324	2	2/13	92.50	0	0
282	Herbert Shutt	England	1906	1906	4	7	6	3.50	647	8	4/29	28.87	0	0
283	Maxmillian Wood	England	1907	1907	1	9	5	4.50	0	0	–	–	1	0
284	William Dean	England	1907	1907	1	3	3*	–	126	2	2/52	26.00	2	0
285	George Lyon	England	1907	1907	2	41	29	10.25	84	2	1/5	21.00	1	0
286	Robert Jesson	England	1907	1910	14	191	38	8.68	846	21	5/42	24.42	8	0
287	Alec Kennedy ♠	England	1907	1936	596	14,925	163*	18.51	134,153	2,549	9/33	21.16	484	0
288	Maurice Lawson	England	1907	1919	7	122	36	12.20	228	5	2/45	34.00	2	0
289	Ernest Remnant ♠	England	1908	1922	121	2,843	115*	17.33	9,118	170	8/61	27.35	59	0
290	Frederick McLaren	England	1908	1908	2	2	4	1.33	198	4	2/30	28.50	1	0
291	George Brown ♠†	England	1908	1933	539	22,962	232*	26.88	30,530	602	8/55	29.66	484	52
292	Harold McDonell ♠	England	1908	1921	78	1,747	76	16.17	9,659	263	7/47	22.43	69	0
293	John Evans	England	1908	1920	7	307	51	27.90	372	5	3/92	41.40	8	0
294	Alastair Campbell	England	1908	1909	7	91	21	9.10	0	0	–	–	1	0
295	C. B. Fry ♠	England	1909	1921	44	3,829	258*	58.90	30	0	–	–	27	0
296	Hamilton Smith	England	1909	1914	27	327	43*	10.54	759	14	3/95	41.00	9	0
297	Frederick Harold	England	1909	1912	2	16	16	8.00	24	0	–	–	1	0
298	George Wilder	England	1909	1909	1	13	13	6.50	60	3	3/14	8.33	0	0
299	George Cole	England	1909	1911	6	111	33	12.22	0	0	–	–	4	0
300	John Moore	England	1910	1913	15	256	30	13.47	72	0	–	–	4	0
301	Verner Luckin	England	1910	1912	10	17	8	2.42	908	13	3/39	39.46	5	0
302	Humphrey Yates	England	1910	1913	13	242	65*	15.12	24	0	–	–	7	0
303	Harold Barton	England	1910	1912	8	146	31	11.23	0	0	–	–	2	0
304	Alexander Cowie	England	1910	1910	2	3	2	1.50	396	9	5/94	29.00	2	0
305	Harold Forster	England	1911	1911	5	33	13	6.60	494	10	5/38	21.20	3	0
306	Arthur Duthie	England	1911	1911	1	6	5	3.00	225	5	3/85	28.20	1	0
307	Albert Fielder	England	1911	1913	3	38	35	12.66	266	6	5/128	37.50	4	0
308	Eric Olivier	South Africa	1911	1911	7	87	43	10.87	618	7	4/30	51.28	5	0
309	Robert Airey	England	1911	1911	3	52	30	10.40	0	0	–	–	2	0
310	Sydney Beadle	England	1911	1911	3	88	28	14.66	54	0	–	–	2	0
311	William Moorcroft	England	1911	1911	1	0	0	–	114	0	–	–	0	0
312	James Sutcliffe	England	1911	1911	1	24	16	12.00	0	0	–	–	0	0
313	Herbert Rogers	England	1912	1914	7	69	18	5.75	66	1	1/126	62.00	0	0
314	Francis Turner	England	1912	1912	1	14	14	14.00	0	0	–	–	1	0
315	Arnold Rutherford	England	1912	1912	1	18	18	18.00	36	0	–	–	0	0
316	Charles Yaldren	England	1912	1912	1	8	8	8.00	66	1	1/52	60.00	0	0
317	Alban Arnold	England	1912	1914	16	542	76	24.63	6	0	–	–	5	0
318	James Budden	England	1912	1912	1	0	0	–	72	0	–	–	0	0
319	Geoffrey Toynbee	England	1912	1912	2	14	14	14.00	0	0	–	–	1	0
320	Sidney Pothecary	England	1912	1920	12	103	22*	10.30	408	4	3/43	64.25	5	0
321	Ralph Evans	England	1912	1912	1	4	4*	–	0	0	–	–	0	0
322	Kenneth Woodroffe	England	1912	1913	2	27	18*	27.00	324	8	5/33	27.00	1	0
323	Frank Charters	England	1913	1913	1	14	9	7.00	0	0	–	–	5	0
324	John Rutherford	England	1913	1913	8	128	33*	9.14	198	3	1/4	36.66	1	0
325	Arthur Jaques ♠	England	1913	1914	49	864	68	13.50	8,725	168	8/21	21.52	28	0
326	James Evans ♠	England	1913	1921	15	196	41	10.31	126	1	1/34	81.00	10	1
327	Geoffrey Chance	England	1913	1913	1	0	0*	0.00	54	0	–	–	0	0
328	Robert Bolton	England	1913	1922	7	121	24	10.08	0	0	–	–	2	0
329	George Sandeman	England	1913	1913	3	9	5*	3.00	252	3	2/73	41.33	1	0
330	Arthur Knight ♠	England	1913	1923	4	41	29	5.85	18	1	1/17	17.00	2	0
331	Cecil Abercrombie	England	1913	1913	13	920	165	38.33	270	1	1/81	166.00	6	0
332	Walter Livsey †	England	1913	1929	309	4,818	110*	15.44	0	0	–	–	373	255
333	John Gregory	England	1913	1913	1	0	0	0.00	144	0	–	–	0	0
334	Hon. Lionel Tennyson ♠	England	1913	1935	347	12,626	217	23.68	3,000	43	3/50	55.20	126	0
335	Alexander Hosie ♠	England	1913	1935	80	3,542	155	26.83	366	4	2/35	78.75	42	0
336	Gerald Harrison	England	1914	1920	22	991	111	28.31	0	0	–	–	10	0
337	James Down	England	1914	1914	2	32	31*	16.00	96	1	1/33	53.00	0	0
338	Basil Melle	South Africa	1914	1921	27	1,207	110	29.43	2,210	25	5/70	42.96	6	0
339	Alistair MacLeod ♠	England	1914	1938	12	271	87	15.05	0	0	–	–	5	0
340	Harry Altham	England	1919	1923	24	713	141	22.28	18	0	–	–	15	0
341	John Kennard	England	1919	1919	2	46	18	23.00	12	0	–	–	0	0
342	Sydney Maartensz †	England	1919	1919	12	283	60	18.86	0	0	–	–	21	4
343	Reginald Brooks †	England	1919	1921	9	224	107	16.26	0	0	–	–	3	0
344	Alfred Evans	England	1919	1920	5	84	47	10.50	556	14	4/74	29.07	3	0
345	Richard Busk	England	1919	1919	2	0	0*	0.00	156	2	1/28	62.50	1	0
346	Charlie McGibbon	England	1919	1919	1	1	1*	1.00	6	0	–	–	0	0
347	Tom Jameson	Ireland	1919	1932	53	2,013	105*	24.85	4,950	77	7/92	33.20	41	0
348	Frank Ryan	England	1919	1920	23	138	23	6.00	2,785	63	7/60	26.09	16	0
349	Patrick Hall	England	1919	1926	11	164	94*	10.25	0	0	–	–	2	0
350	Edward Causton	England	1919	1919	1	21	21	21.00	6	0	–	–	0	0
351	Lionel Isherwood ♠	England	1919	1923	26	627	61*	16.50	0	0	–	–	13	0
352	Edward Armitage	England	1919	1925	8	183	42	13.07	0	0	–	–	5	0
353	Jack Gentry	England	1919	1919	1	3	3	3.00	48	0	–	–	0	0
354	Anthony Hill	England	1920	1930	18	193	24	7.42	0	0	–	–	6	0
355	Herbert Hake ♠	England	1920	1925	21	478	94	17.70	18	0	–	–	5	0
356	John Crookes	England	1920	1920	3	50	36*	12.50	0	0	–	–	6	0
357	Frederick Bates	England	1920	1920	2	18	9	6.00	0	0	–	–	0	0
358	Arthur McIntyre ♠	England	1920	1923	28	493	55	11.46	48	0	–	–	15	0
359	Ronnie Aird ♠	England	1920	1938	108	3,603	159	22.24	236	2	1/4	95.50	41	0
360	Oswald Cornwallis	England	1921	1921	1	0	0	–	0	0	–	–	0	0
361	Charles Brutton ♠	England	1921	1930	81	2,052	119*	17.84	132	0	–	–	36	0
362	Albert Ward	England	1921	1921	1	11	6	11.00	72	1	1/28	57.00	1	0
363	Stuart Boyes	England	1921	1939	474	7,515	104	14.42	82,926	1,415	9/57	23.68	471	0
364	Percy Lawrie	England	1921	1928	28	959	107	22.30	0	0	–	–	14	0
365	Stephen Fry ♠†	England	1922	1931	29	508	78	10.58	0	0	–	–	16	1
366	Harold Day ♠	England	1922	1931	78	3,047	142	25.18	36	0	–	–	26	0
367	William Shirley	England	1922	1925	49	1,035	90	17.54	2,343	52	4/51	27.42	23	0
368	Cosmo Crawley	England	1923	1923	1	22	14	11.00	0	0	–	–	0	0
369	Walter Pearce	England	1923	1926	9	127	63	18.14	0	0	–	–	1	0
370	James Gornall	England	1923	1923	1	18	11	9.00	0	0	–	–	0	0
371	Alexander Cadell	England	1923	1927	2	8	6	4.00	56	2	1/7	12.50	1	0
372	Thomas Smith	England	1923	1924	9	88	18	8.90	0	0	–	–	3	0
373	Walter Fielder	England	1923	1923	1	2	2*	–	42	0	–	–	0	0
374	Raymond Love	England	1923	1923	2	15	13*	7.50	12	0	–	–	2	0
375	Francis Arkwright	England	1923	1923	3	44	14	8.80	0	0	–	–	2	0
376	Geoffrey Lowndes ♠	England	1924	1935	41	1,558	143	21.94	3,172	40	3/22	37.57	15	0
377	Robert St Leger Fowler	Ireland	1924	1924	3	106	51	17.66	402	4	3/68	51.50	2	0
378	Arthur Kneller	England	1924	1926	8	76	25*	8.44	0	0	–	–	1	0
379	Frederick Gross	England	1924	1929	34	202	32*	7.21	3,101	50	5/53	37.00	17	0
380	Norman Bowell	England	1924	1924	2	8	6	4.00	60	0	–	–	0	0
381	Frederick Hyland	England	1924	1924	1	0	0	–	0	0	–	–	0	0
382	Arthur Judd ♠	England	1925	1935	64	1,625	119	17.47	1,217	28	6/65	33.07	26	0
383	Kenneth Paver	England	1925	1926	2	52	26	13.00	0	0	–	–	2	0
384	Lewis Dorey	England	1925	1925	1	0	0	0.00	0	0	–	–	1	0
385	Arthur Hayward	England	1925	1926	4	17	10	4.25	0	0	–	–	0	0
386	Lewis Harfield	England	1925	1931	80	2,460	89	20.00	1,119	14	3/35	46.35	37	0
387	Herbert Gibbons	England	1925	1928	7	70	27	10.00	96	0	–	–	1	0
388	Henry Sprinks	England	1925	1929	21	167	40	9.27	2,082	29	4/56	46.13	14	0
389	Walter McBride	England	1925	1929	31	405	35	13.96	1,769	24	3/36	37.54	19	0
390	John Parker ♠	England	1926	1933	44	1,094	156	18.54	354	6	2/14	43.00	21	0
391	Arthur Pothecary	England	1927	1946	271	9,477	130	23.34	3,107	52	4/47	41.15	147	0
392	Richard Utley	England	1927	1928	27	164	27	6.56	3,670	79	6/43	26.32	8	0
393	William Scott	England	1927	1927	5	102	35	20.40	192	4	2/66	32.75	0	0
394	Jim Bailey	England	1927	1952	242	9,302	133	24.93	30,227	467	7/7	26.97	62	0
395	Merrik Ward	England	1927	1929	5	141	48	15.66	234	0	–	–	3	0
396	Len Creese ♠	England	1928	1939	278	9,894	241	24.01	25,030	401	8/37	27.78	190	0
397	Geoffrey Adams ♠	England	1928	1930	18	421	42	13.58	283	4	1/0	40.50	3	0
398	Arthur Lewis	England	1929	1929	1	20	20	20.00	0	0	–	–	1	0
399	Thomas Hollingworth	England	1929	1929	2	14	14	4.66	18	0	–	–	0	0
400	Lofty Herman	England	1929	1948	321	4,327	92	11.09	56,266	1,041	8/49	27.02	120	0
401	Cecil Dixon	Scotland	1929	1929	2	10	5	2.50	0	0	–	–	0	0
402	John Arnold	England	1929	1950	396	21,596	227	32.92	1,531	17	3/34	69.52	181	0
403	Rodney Palmer	England	1930	1933	3	0	0	0.00	308	6	5/93	31.16	1	0
404	Giles Baring ♠	England	1930	1939	62	562	46	8.32	9,237	176	9/26	27.48	28	0
405	Thomas Jameson	England	1930	1931	3	44	23*	14.66	24	0	–	–	0	0
406	Charles Fynn	England	1930	1931	9	45	21	6.42	778	11	3/92	40.54	2	0
407	Edward Bartley †	England	1931	1931	3	5	5*	1.66	0	0	–	–	2	0
408	William Dodd	England	1931	1935	10	95	31	6.78	698	10	5/63	32.10	3	0
409	Ted Drake	England	1931	1936	16	219	45	8.11	294	4	2/37	42.75	10	0
410	Dick Moore ♠	England	1931	1939	129	5,885	316	26.99	1,705	25	3/46	39.12	115	0
411	Neil McCorkell †	England	1932	1951	383	15,833	203	25.87	117	1	1/73	117.00	512	177
412	Gerry Hill	England	1932	1954	371	9,085	161	18.13	44,356	617	8/62	29.92	170	0
413	Gilbert Jessop ♠	England	1933	1933	3	47	25	9.40	96	1	1/16	47.00	2	0
414	Edward Cadogan	England	1933	1935	5	53	27	7.57	714	17	5/52	23.82	3	0
415	Clifford Hall	England	1933	1935	5	77	37	11.00	0	0	–	–	1	0
416	Arthur Lee	England	1933	1933	1	0	0	0.00	0	0	–	–	0	0
417	Cecil Paris ♠	England	1933	1948	98	3,660	134*	22.87	438	4	1/10	54.00	73	0
418	John Rawlence	England	1934	1934	5	87	38	14.50	0	0	–	–	3	0
419	Lloyd Budd	England	1934	1946	60	941	77*	11.47	4,827	64	4/22	39.15	24	0
420	Stanley Fenley	England	1935	1935	3	25	11	4.16	228	1	1/66	162.00	1	0
421	Thomas Collins	England	1935	1935	2	31	13	7.75	42	1	1/22	22.00	0	0
422	Ernest Hayter	England	1935	1937	3	36	17	7.20	66	0	–	–	0	0
423	Walter Lancashire	England	1935	1937	18	471	66	16.82	531	7	2/49	51.00	7	0
424	Arthur Holt	England	1935	1948	79	2,853	116	22.46	34	1	1/24	47.00	32	0
425	George Taylor ♠	England	1935	1939	24	306	41	9.27	21	1	1/8	21.00	15	0
426	Howard Lawson	England	1935	1937	45	527	53	9.41	4,950	69	5/91	36.14	16	0
427	John Manners	England	1936	1948	21	1,162	147	31.40	24	0	–	–	4	0
428	Donald Walker †	England	1937	1939	73	3,004	147	26.12	18	0	–	–	75	1
429	Richard Court	England	1937	1939	18	224	35	10.18	2,273	33	4/53	37.21	8	0
430	George Heath	England	1937	1949	132	586	34*	5.58	24,845	404	7/49	28.11	49	0
431	John Blake	England	1937	1939	14	328	48	13.66	0	0	–	–	9	0
432	George Jones	Scotland	1937	1937	9	169	37*	14.08	0	0	–	–	3	0
433	Geoffrey Hebden	England	1937	1951	6	69	22*	8.62	342	3	1/11	57.33	1	0
434	John Steele	England	1938	1939	19	434	44	16.69	3,673	66	6/72	25.90	9	0
435	Percy MacKenzie	England	1938	1939	22	652	76	19.75	874	17	4/34	35.58	11	0
436	Philip Weaver	England	1938	1938	2	55	37	18.33	0	0	–	–	1	0
437	Clifford Andrews †	England	1938	1948	7	127	29	14.11	0	0	–	–	6	1
438	Charles Knott ♠	England	1938	1954	166	1,003	27	7.11	32,764	647	8.26	23.53	55	0
439	John Eggar	England	1938	1938	2	38	28	12.66	0	0	–	–	2	0
440	Bill Proud	England	1938	1939	7	183	38*	16.63	0	0	–	–	2	0
441	Ian Shield	England	1939	1939	4	16	6	4.00	528	4	2/91	68.50	0	0
442	John Godfrey	England	1939	1947	12	61	25*	4.35	1,462	15	4/116	50.20	1	0
443	Thomas Dean	England	1939	1949	28	283	26	9.12	2,883	51	7/51	31.11	31	0
444	Leo Harrison ♠†	England	1939	1966	387	8,708	153	17.66	256	0	–	–	567	99
445	Desmond Eagar ♠	England	1946	1957	311	10,091	158*	21.02	1,201	15	2/10	62.46	333	0
446	Neville Rogers ♠	England	1946	1955	285	15,292	186	31.79	28	0	–	–	193	0
447	Harry Downer	England	1946	1946	2	8	4	2.00	0	0	–	–	0	0
448	Frederick Parker	England	1946	1946	2	22	11	5.50	0	0	–	–	0	0
449	Alan Shirreff	England	1946	1947	12	387	77*	21.50	1,231	13	3/48	56.23	5	0
450	John Bridger ♠	England	1946	1954	38	1,725	142	27.82	31	0	–	–	29	0
451	David Guard	England	1946	1949	15	405	89	15.57	0	0	–	–	7	0
452	Rodney Exton	England	1946	1946	4	39	24*	9.75	108	0	–	–	1	0
453	Arthur Kimish †	England	1946	1946	3	18	12*	6.00	0	0	–	–	3	3
454	Anthony Rimell	England	1946	1950	2	82	42*	27.33	144	1	1/52	65.00	1	0
455	Victor Ransom	England	1947	1950	34	419	58	9.97	6,123	88	5/50	34.89	18	0
456	Harold Dawson	England	1947	1948	10	236	37	13.11	12	0	–	–	6	0
457	Gilbert Dawson	England	1947	1949	60	2,643	158*	26.43	18	0	–	–	36	0
458	Donald Roper	England	1947	1947	1	30	30	15.00	0	0	–	–	0	0
459	John Taylor	England	1947	1949	4	76	27*	15.20	18	0	–	–	0	0
460	Derek Shackleton ♠	England	1948	1969	583	8,602	87*	14.43	146,807	2,669	9/30	18.23	207	0
461	Alan Waldron	England	1948	1948	2	74	52	24.66	294	3	2/66	43.66	1	0
462	Jimmy Gray	England	1948	1966	453	22,450	213*	30.83	32,636	451	7/52	30.02	350	0
463	Clifford Walker	England	1949	1954	126	4,990	150*	27.26	5,872	51	5/40	49.88	88	0
464	Alan Rayment	England	1949	1958	198	6,333	126	20.36	1,175	19	4/75	39.78	86	0
465	Richard Carty	England	1949	1954	55	798	53	14.77	8,619	138	7/29	30.17	24	0
466	Reginald Dare	England	1949	1954	109	1,679	109*	12.25	15,229	185	6/28	35.02	70	0
467	David Blake †	England	1949	1958	50	1,811	100	21.81	0	0	–	–	62	8
468	Ralph Prouton †	England	1949	1954	52	982	90	14.44	0	0	–	–	84	13
469	Vic Cannings	England	1950	1959	230	1,888	43*	9.88	47,703	834	7/52	21.69	89	0
470	Alec Debnam	England	1950	1951	10	239	64	15.93	276	4	1/2	48.25	4	0
471	Colin Ingleby-Mackenzie ♠	England	1951	1965	309	11,140	132*	24.59	40	0	–	–	186	0
472	Mike Barnard	England	1952	1966	276	9,314	128*	22.02	1,113	16	3/35	35.18	312	0
473	Guy Jewell	England	1952	1952	1	1	1	0.50	66	1	1/38	52.00	2	0
474	Henry Horton	England	1953	1967	405	21,536	160*	33.49	306	3	2/0	54.00	254	0
475	Roy Marshall ♠	Barbados	1953	1972	504	30,303	228*	36.03	6,254	99	6/36	24.27	233	0
476	Donald Cartridge	England	1953	1953	3	6	4	1.00	0	0	–	–	2	0
477	Hugh Thompson	England	1953	1954	2	16	16	16.00	390	2	2/106	129.50	1	0
478	Mervyn Burden	England	1953	1963	174	901	51	6.82	29,210	481	8/38	26.11	76	0
479	Raymond Pitman	England	1954	1959	50	926	77	13.61	95	1	1/4	68.00	42	0
480	Hubert Webb	England	1954	1954	1	27	16	13.50	0	0	–	–	0	0
481	Peter Sainsbury ♠	England	1954	1976	593	19,576	163	27.03	85,641	1,245	8/76	24.14	601	0
482	Malcolm Heath	England	1954	1962	143	569	33	5.86	28,992	527	8/43	25.11	42	0
483	Derek Tulk	England	1956	1957	2	8	8*	–	96	0	–	–	1	0
484	Raymond Flood	England	1956	1960	24	885	138*	23.28	12	0	–	–	10	0
485	Bernard Harrison	England	1957	1962	14	519	110	23.59	108	1	1/34	65.00	8	0
486	Colin Roper †	England	1957	1957	1	7	7	7.00	0	0	–	–	1	0
487	Butch White	England	1957	1971	315	2,967	58*	10.86	55,744	1,097	9/44	23.36	103	0
488	Alan Wassell	England	1957	1966	121	1,207	61	9.07	21,181	317	7/87	27.05	96	0
489	Barry Reed	England	1958	1970	122	4,910	138	24.30	6	0	–	–	60	0
490	Dennis Baldry	England	1959	1962	85	3,342	151	24.75	4,883	70	7/76	36.77	38	0
491	Brian Timms †	England	1959	1968	208	3,236	120	15.70	0	0	–	–	402	60
492	Danny Livingstone †	England	1959	1972	299	12,660	200	27.94	110	1	1/31	68.00	240	2
493	Charles Fry	England	1960	1960	5	134	38	16.75	6	0	–	–	1	0
494	Dan Piachaud	Ceylon	1960	1960	12	37	13	6.16	2,034	29	4/62	29.31	8	0
495	Robert Caple	England	1961	1967	65	1,531	64*	18.22	2,399	28	5/54	35.82	32	0
496	Alan Castell	England	1961	1971	112	1,622	76	15.90	14,832	229	6/22	30.97	89	0
497	Geoff Keith	England	1962	1967	60	1,775	101*	21.38	1,032	12	4/49	45.83	63	0
498	Peter Haslop	England	1962	1962	1	2	2*	–	204	2	2/82	41.00	1	0
499	Bob Cottam	England	1963	1971	188	615	35	5.44	37,112	693	9/25	20.71	84	0
500	Keith Wheatley	England	1965	1970	79	1,781	79*	18.55	5,208	69	4/1	28.31	32	0
501	Richard Gilliat ♠	England	1966	1978	220	9,358	223*	30.09	101	3	1/3	44.33	181	0
502	David Turner ♠	England	1968	1989	416	18,683	184*	30.88	626	9	2/7	39.66	185	0
503	Trevor Jesty ♠†	England	1966	1984	340	14,753	248	31.79	31,299	475	7/75	28.62	200	1
504	Richard Lewis	England	1967	1976	103	3,282	136	18.97	132	1	1/59	104.00	65	0
505	Barry Richards ♠	South Africa	1968	1978	204	15,607	240	50.50	3,708	46	7/63	36.41	264	0
506	John Holder	England	1968	1972	47	347	33	10.68	7,098	139	7/79	24.56	12	0
507	Bob Stephenson ♠†	England	1969	1980	263	4,566	100*	16.48	1,531	55	–	–	570	75
508	Larry Worrell	England	1969	1972	32	289	50	11.56	4,965	65	5/67	33.55	21	0
509	Bill Buck	England	1969	1969	1	11	6	5.50	264	2	2/54	67.50	0	0
510	Richard McIlwaine	England	1969	1970	4	29	17	14.50	558	4	2/40	68.25	1	0
511	Gordon Greenidge ♠	Barbados	1970	1987	275	19,840	259	45.40	744	16	5/49	24.18	315	0
512	John Rice	England	1971	1982	168	5,091	161*	20.44	16,936	230	7/48	33.50	153	0
513	David O'Sullivan	New Zealand	1971	1973	26	347	45	15.77	5,896	84	6/26	23.82	14	0
514	Bob Herman	England	1972	1977	89	869	56	11.58	16,614	270	8/42	25.06	32	0
515	Tom Mottram	England	1972	1976	35	95	15*	5.58	6,013	111	6/63	24.11	11	0
516	Mike Taylor	England	1973	1980	145	3,646	103*	22.93	19,922	308	7/23	24.21	75	0
517	Andy Murtagh	Ireland	1973	1977	26	631	65	15.39	642	6	2/46	72.33	8	0
518	Ian Watson	England	1973	1973	1	6	5	3.00	0	0	–	–	2	0
519	Michael Hill †	England	1973	1976	6	68	27*	17.00	0	0	–	–	9	0
520	Andy Roberts	(Antigua and Barbuda) Leeward Islands	1973	1978	58	583	39	13.88	10,705	244	8/47	16.70	11	0
521	Nigel Cowley	England	1974	1989	257	6,773	109*	22.57	30,763	425	6/48	32.89	96	0
522	John Southern	England	1975	1983	164	1,653	61*	15.30	28,757	412	6/46	29.81	59	0
523	Peter Barrett	England	1975	1976	6	138	26	12.54	6	0	–	–	0	0
524	Tim Tremlett	England	1976	1991	201	3,815	102*	21.31	25,699	445	6/53	23.44	69	0
525	David Rock	England	1976	1979	37	1,227	114	19.17	6	0	–	–	19	0
526	Nick Pocock ♠	England	1976	1984	127	3,790	164	23.10	554	4	1/4	99.00	124	0
527	Richard Elms	England	1977	1978	17	196	48	16.33	1,888	27	4/83	37.59	7	0
528	Keith Stevenson	England	1978	1983	99	672	31	9.88	14,182	257	7/22	29.33	33	0
529	Mark Nicholas ♠	England	1978	1995	361	17,401	206*	33.98	5,693	69	6/37	45.84	207	0
530	Paul Terry ♠	England	1978	1996	288	16,134	190	36.50	94	0	–	–	328	0
531	Malcolm Marshall ♠	Barbados	1979	1993	210	5,847	117	25.20	37,614	826	8/71	18.64	76	0
532	Michael Bailey	England	1979	1982	20	228	24	11.40	1,750	18	5/89	55.33	8	0
533	Shaun Graf	Australia	1980	1980	15	284	57*	20.28	1,883	20	2/24	44.45	9	0
534	Chris Smith ♠	England	1980	1991	222	15,287	217	45.63	3,852	44	5/69	53.75	154	0
535	Steve Malone	England	1980	1984	46	178	23	6.48	6,295	103	7/55	33.79	11	0
536	Bobby Parks ♠†	England	1980	1992	253	3,936	89	19.68	189	0	–	–	630	70
537	Richard Hayward	England	1981	1982	13	454	101*	25.22	12	0	–	–	6	0
538	Christopher Curzon †	England	1981	1981	1	53	31*	53.00	0	0	–	–	1	0
539	Kevin Emery	England	1982	1983	29	45	18*	3.75	4,386	84	6/51	25.64	3	0
540	Robin Smith ♠	England	1982	2003	307	18,984	209*	42.09	1,010	14	2/11	66.57	166	0
541	Chris Goldie †	England	1983	1985	3	6	6	6.00	0	0	–	–	5	3
542	Jon Hardy	England	1984	1985	29	1,255	107*	35.85	6	0	–	–	13	0
543	Rajesh Maru	England	1984	1998	213	2,818	74	17.50	38,363	504	8/41	33.62	240	0
544	Elvis Reifer	Barbados	1984	1984	20	357	47	19.83	3,149	49	4/43	35.93	6	0
545	Steve Andrew	England	1984	1989	57	105	14	7.50	8,061	147	7/92	28.91	15	0
546	Cardigan Connor	(Anguilla) Leeward Islands	1984	1998	221	1,814	59	11.93	37,397	614	9/38	31.74	61	0
547	Tony Middleton	England	1984	1995	105	5,665	221	34.75	22,545	359	8/49	32.47	78	0
548	Kevan James	England	1985	1999	204	8,189	162	31.01	12	0	–	–	75	0
549	Ian Chivers	England	1985	1987	2	20	20*	–	150	2	1/4	38.00	0	0
550	Paul-Jan Bakker	Netherlands	1986	1992	69	333	22	9.51	11,525	193	7/31	28.01	9	0
551	Adrian Aymes †	England	1987	2002	215	7,338	133	31.22	246	6	2/101	73.00	516	44
552	Stephen Jefferies	South Africa	1988	1989	22	707	60	33.66	3,329	46	8/97	41.69	11	0
553	Richard Scott	England	1988	1990	27	917	107*	21.83	279	5	2/5	51.40	20	0
554	Jon Ayling	England	1988	1993	60	2,082	121	26.69	7,374	134	5/12	25.41	17	0
555	Alan Mullally	England	1988	2004	53	301	36	7.52	10,495	192	9/93	23.43	9	0
556	Shaun Udal ♠	England	1989	2007	250	6,496	117*	22.95	46,254	708	8/50	32.12	112	0
557	Kevin Shine	England	1989	1993	54	258	26*	9.92	6,977	119	8/47	38.28	7	0
558	Julian Wood	England	1989	1993	27	960	96	29.09	63	1	1/5	38.00	13	0
559	Ian Turner	England	1989	1993	24	159	39*	8.36	4,299	54	5/81	36.38	12	0
560	Linden Joseph	Guyana	1990	1990	6	152	69*	152.00	612	7	2/28	66.00	1	0
561	David Gower ♠	England	1990	1993	73	4,325	155	40.80	1	0	–	–	54	0
562	Rupert Cox	England	1990	1994	19	605	104*	24.20	6	0	–	–	12	0
563	Aaqib Javed	Pakistan	1991	1991	18	25	15*	6.25	3,061	53	6/91	31.24	0	0
564	Sean Morris	England	1992	1996	37	1,830	174	29.04	4	0	–	–	43	0
565	Martin Thursfield	England	1993	1996	20	277	47	14.57	2,415	33	6/130	39.42	1	0
566	Martin Jean-Jacques	England	1993	1994	7	94	22*	18.80	634	9	3/44	47.00	2	0
567	Darren Flint	England	1993	1995	15	72	17*	8.00	2,924	34	5/32	38.76	8	0
568	James Bovill	England	1993	1997	37	314	31	10.12	5,507	99	6/29	33.11	6	0
569	Matthew Keech	England	1994	1999	49	2,240	127	32.46	414	3	1/12	90.33	47	0
570	Winston Benjamin	(Antigua and Barbuda) Leeward Islands	1994	1996	11	371	117	21.82	2,102	30	6/46	26.20	7	0
571	Norman Cowans	England	1994	1994	12	51	19	5.66	2,097	26	4/76	37.92	3	0
572	Giles White †	England	1994	2004	126	6,048	156	30.39	835	11	3/23	54.45	106	2
573	Paul Whitaker ♠	England	1994	1998	37	1,734	119	30.42	955	13	3/36	43.15	15	0
574	John Stephenson ♠	England	1995	2001	93	3,617	140	26.40	11,460	187	7/51	34.09	61	0
575	Heath Streak	Zimbabwe	1995	1995	19	378	69	15.12	3,098	53	4/40	30.73	6	0
576	Richard Dibden	England	1995	1995	5	1	1	0.16	835	8	2/36	74.00	0	0
577	Jason Laney	England	1995	2002	84	4,307	112	30.11	366	2	1/24	110.50	70	0
578	Stuart Milburn	England	1996	1997	21	270	54*	16.87	3,534	39	4/38	52.97	1	0
579	Mark Garaway †	England	1996	1999	3	119	55	29.75	0	0	–	–	8	2
580	Simon Renshaw	England	1996	2000	38	459	56	17.00	6,265	91	5/110	37.24	14	0
581	William Kendall ♠	England	1996	2004	116	5,668	201	31.66	780	7	2/46	63.71	103	0
582	Liam Botham	England	1996	1996	3	31	30	10.33	330	8	5/67	33.50	2	0
583	Dimitri Mascarenhas ♠	England	1996	2013	195	6,495	131	25.07	28,331	450	6/25	28.22	76	0
584	Matthew Hayden	Australia	1997	1997	17	1,446	235*	53.55	198	3	2/17	55.33	13	0
585	Derek Kenway †	England	1997	2005	93	4,382	166	29.60	150	4	1/5	39.75	85	1
586	Lee Savident	Guernsey	1997	2000	4	32	10*	8.00	384	4	2/86	71.50	2	0
587	Chetan Patel	England	1997	1997	1	9	6	9.00	108	0	–	–	0	0
588	Thomas Hansen	Denmark	1997	1999	4	64	24	12.80	540	5	3/59	54.20	0	0
589	Simon Francis	England	1997	2000	14	84	30*	7.63	1,844	24	4/95	45.79	1	0
590	Peter Hartley	England	1998	2000	34	446	58	15.92	5,707	102	8/65	29.23	6	0
591	Nixon McLean	(Saint Vincent and the Grenadines) Windward Islands	1998	1999	30	494	70	13.72	5,939	108	6/101	28.37	11	0
592	Alex Morris	England	1998	2003	46	1,030	65	21.45	7,021	147	5/39	24.56	22	0
593	Zac Morris	England	1998	1999	2	11	10	2.25	205	0	–	–	0	0
594	Steve Lugsden	England	1999	1999	2	25	16	12.50	306	4	3/105	40.25	0	0
595	Charles van der Gucht	England	2000	2000	1	0	0*	–	132	3	3/75	25.00	0	0
596	Shane Warne ♠	Australia	2000	2007	66	2,040	107*	25.50	14,446	276	7/99	25.58	69	0
597	Andrew Sexton	England	2000	2000	4	71	36	10.14	0	0	–	–	3	0
598	Iain Brunnschweiler †	England	2000	2003	6	91	34	13.00	0	0	–	–	20	0
599	Chris Tremlett	England	2000	2009	84	1,504	64	18.12	13,864	264	6/44	28.55	25	0
600	Lawrence Prittipaul	England	2000	2004	23	975	152	28.67	759	9	3/17	49.22	18	0
601	Neil Johnson	Zimbabwe	2001	2002	34	1,930	117	37.84	2,971	45	4/20	38.33	55	0
602	James Hamblin	England	2001	2003	11	440	96	27.50	1,002	14	6/93	51.64	5	0
603	James Schofield	England	2001	2002	4	43	21*	10.75	853	19	4/51	25.10	1	0
604	John Francis	England	2001	2003	17	700	82	24.13	48	2	1/1	17.50	12	0
605	John Crawley ♠†	England	2002	2009	103	7,210	311*	45.06	83	1	1/7	82.00	54	1
606	Nic Pothas ♠†	South Africa	2002	2011	132	7,549	146*	43.88	114	1	1/16	58.00	375	23
607	James Tomlinson	England	2002	2016	127	936	51	10.88	22,059	380	8/46	31.61	26	0
608	James Adams ♠	England	2002	2018	216	13,298	262*	37.88	973	11	2/16	60.09	178	0
609	Wasim Akram	Pakistan	2003	2003	5	55	23	9.16	1,005	20	3/31	25.15	0	0
610	Ed Giddins	England	2003	2003	3	10	10	3.33	593	13	4/88	25.84	0	0
611	Simon Katich	Australia	2003	2012	39	2,661	196	46.68	1,420	23	4/21	36.13	33	0
612	Dominic Clapp	England	2003	2003	1	4	4	4.00	0	0	–	–	0	0
613	Mark Thorburn	England	2003	2003	1	0	0	–	186	3	2/53	40.00	0	0
614	James Bruce	England	2003	2007	43	216	32	6.96	6,329	119	5/43	32.23	13	0
615	Richard Hindley	England	2003	2003	1	76	68*	76.00	54	0	–	–	0	0
616	Chaminda Vaas	Sri Lanka	2003	2003	3	64	35	16.00	564	8	4/82	38.75	2	0
617	Michael Brown	England	2004	2008	64	3,645	133	34.71	0	0	–	–	52	0
618	Michael Clarke	Australia	2004	2004	12	709	140	35.45	253	1	1/52	160.00	20	0
619	Billy Taylor	England	2004	2009	26	248	40	11.80	3,740	65	6/32	31.41	4	0
620	Shane Watson	Australia	2004	2005	6	676	203*	84.50	724	9	2/33	44.44	10	0
621	Chris Benham ♠	England	2004	2010	45	1,975	111	27.05	30	0	–	–	51	0
622	Greg Lamb	Zimbabwe	2004	2008	22	684	94	21.37	1,304	13	2/30	66.61	22	0
623	Sean Ervine ♠	Zimbabwe	2005	2018	188	9,040	237*	35.17	16,304	214	5/60	43.16	147	0
624	Richard Logan	England	2005	2006	9	69	28	6.90	1,030	10	3/59	75.00	1	0
625	Kevin Pietersen	England	2005	2008	7	524	126	43.66	36	0	–	–	4	0
626	Tom Burrows †	England	2005	2009	12	247	42	19.00	0	0	–	–	36	1
627	Craig McMillan	New Zealand	2005	2005	4	169	52	24.14	246	3	2/49	50.00	0	0
628	Jono McLean	South Africa	2005	2006	7	302	68	33.55	0	0	–	–	4	0
629	Andy Bichel	Australia	2005	2005	4	227	138	75.66	724	14	4/122	31.50	1	0
630	Dominic Thornely	Australia	2006	2006	15	759	76	34.50	1,194	22	3/38	26.27	12	0
631	Michael Carberry	England	2006	2017	147	10,277	300*	42.64	1,235	13	2/85	62.84	60	0
632	Kevin Latouf	England	2006	2006	1	29	29	29.00	0	0	–	–	0	0
633	David Griffiths	England	2006	2013	36	202	31*	6.51	5,716	105	6/85	34.80	4	0
634	Michael Lumb ♠	England	2007	2011	54	2,997	219	36.54	24	0	–	–	44	0
635	Stuart Clark	Australia	2007	2007	6	71	17	10.14	1,052	24	7/82	25.08	3	0
636	Daren Powell	Jamaica	2007	2007	4	63	25	10.50	615	15	4/8	22.86	1	0
637	David Balcombe	England	2007	2014	52	701	73	18.45	8,584	141	8/71	33.27	8	0
638	Liam Dawson	England	2007	2026	211	10,424	171	34.17	24,694	361	7/68	32.36	204	0
639	Shane Bond	New Zealand	2008	2008	4	33	17	6.60	595	19	7/66	19.21	0	0
640	Hamza Riazuddin	England	2008	2013	9	130	55*	18.57	1,074	18	5/61	28.88	3	0
641	Nantie Hayward	South Africa	2008	2008	1	24	17*	24.00	151	3	2/87	33.66	0	0
642	Rory Kleinveldt	South Africa	2008	2008	1	20	16	10.00	54	1	1/17	42.00	0	0
643	Imran Tahir	South Africa	2008	2014	29	409	77*	17.04	6,187	130	7/66	25.46	14	0
644	Dominic Cork ♠	England	2009	2011	35	987	55	24.07	5,837	94	5/14	27.77	32	0
645	Marcus North	Australia	2009	2009	1	15	15	15.00	0	0	–	–	0	0
646	James Vince ♠	England	2009	2024	197	12,408	240	41.22	1,604	23	5/41	45.08	198	0
647	Tom Parsons	England	2009	2009	1	0	0	0.00	108	3	3/39	21.00	0	0
648	Danny Briggs	England	2009	2015	61	921	54	15.61	10,823	158	6/65	34.91	16	0
649	Neil McKenzie	South Africa	2010	2013	42	2,898	237	47.51	264	3	2/30	45.00	39	0
650	Kabir Ali	England	2010	2012	17	302	32	14.38	2,897	54	5/33	31.37	3	0
651	Michael Bates †	England	2010	2014	46	1,124	103	21.21	0	0	–	–	136	7
652	Chris Wood	England	2010	2018	43	1,326	105*	23.67	6,169	105	5/39	30.22	14	0
653	Rangana Herath	Sri Lanka	2010	2010	4	59	17*	19.66	1,053	10	4/98	46.30	1	0
654	Daniel Christian	Australia	2010	2010	1	64	36	32.00	133	2	2/115	57.50	0	0
655	Phillip Hughes	Australia	2010	2010	3	85	38	14.16	0	0	–	–	0	0
656	Simon Jones	Wales	2010	2011	2	0	0*	0.00	243	5	4/60	25.00	0	0
657	Johann Myburgh	South Africa	2011	2011	6	287	80	26.09	90	1	1/30	66.00	2	0
658	Friedel de Wet	South Africa	2011	2011	4	49	16*	16.33	744	9	2/78	52.22	5	0
659	Benny Howell	England	2011	2011	1	71	71	35.50	0	0	–	–	0	0
660	Sean Terry	Ireland	2012	2015	11	440	62*	29.33	0	0	–	–	9	0
661	Bilal Shafayat	England	2012	2012	8	289	93	28.90	12	0	–	–	0	0
662	George Bailey ♠	Australia	2013	2017	16	914	161	38.08	12	0	–	–	8	0
663	Adam Wheater †	England	2013	2016	56	2,760	204*	36.80	0	0	–	–	84	7
664	Michael Roberts	England	2013	2013	6	159	44	19.87	23	0	–	–	2	0
665	Glen Querl	Zimbabwe	2013	2013	1	0	0	–	162	1	1/20	47.00	0	0
666	Sohail Tanvir	Pakistan	2013	2013	4	133	38	26.60	644	10	3/62	34.80	0	0
667	Adam Rouse †	England	2013	2013	1	9	9	9.00	0	0	–	–	0	0
668	Matt Coles	England	2013	2014	20	369	83	16.77	2943	62	6/71	29.00	6	0
669	Brad Taylor	England	2013	2018	6	133	36	19.00	798	13	4/64	41.84	2	0
670	Ruel Brathwaite	Barbados	2013	2013	3	26	17	13.00	348	6	3/112	37.00	1	0
671	Will Smith ♠	England	2014	2017	50	2,982	210	37.74	1,240	13	2/27	48.15	42	0
672	Joe Gatting	England	2014	2015	12	471	67	27.70	36	0	–	–	3	0
673	Kyle Abbott ♠	South Africa	2014	present	130	2,478	97*	17.45	22,240	542	9/40	19.54	18	0
674	Glenn Maxwell	Australia	2014	2014	1	109	85	54.50	36	2	2/33	16.50	0	0
675	Nathan Rimmington	Australia	2014	2014	1	65	65*	65.00	96	2	2/51	25.50	0	0
676	Tom Alsop †	England	2014	2021	60	2,500	150	26.88	84	3	2/59	27.00	78	0
677	Gareth Berg	Italy	2015	2019	57	1,959	99*	27.59	8,475	125	6/56	31.34	21	0
678	Andre Adams	New Zealand	2015	2015	3	58	31	14.50	720	9	3/68	39.88	3	0
679	Lewis McManus †	England	2015	2021	55	1,876	132*	27.18	0	0	–	–	122	13
680	Fidel Edwards	Barbados	2015	2019	50	186	20	6.20	7,417	185	6/50	25.35	7	0
681	Brad Wheal	Scotland	2015	2026	56	591	61	12.84	7,885	136	6/51	33.03	18	0
682	Jackson Bird	Australia	2015	2015	6	54	12	6.75	1,244	19	4/146	39.73	1	0
683	Mason Crane	England	2015	2023	43	444	29	10.57	6,588	104	5/35	39.76	11	0
684	Ryan McLaren	South Africa	2015	2016	20	992	100	47.23	3,083	43	5/104	38.34	8	0
685	Ryan Stevenson	England	2015	2020	7	124	51	20.66	773	9	4/70	51.11	1	0
686	Joe Weatherley	England	2016	present	65	2,385	168	23.38	396	5	1/2	53.60	54	0
687	Hamza Ali	England	2016	2016	1	0	0	–	102	2	2/47	29.50	1	0
688	Reece Topley	England	2016	2017	3	38	16	19.00	266	2	1/56	89.00	0	0
689	Tino Best	Barbados	2016	2016	6	49	23*	7.00	821	14	5/90	39.57	3	0
690	Gareth Andrew	England	2016	2016	6	85	25	14.16	774	7	3/104	62.71	2	0
691	Andy Carter	England	2016	2016	2	8	4	4.00	252	8	4/52	21.00	1	0
692	David Wainwright	England	2016	2016	1	36	35*	–	186	2	2/112	56.00	0	0
693	Asher Hart	England	2017	2017	2	44	36	14.66	263	5	3/17	22.20	1	0
694	Rilee Rossouw	South Africa	2017	2019	29	1,423	120*	30.93	0	0	–	–	17	0
695	Ian Holland	United States	2017	2024	69	2,580	146*	25.80	6,214	95	6/60	30.23	37	0
696	Matt Salisbury	England	2017	2017	3	33	17*	11.00	447	8	3/65	33.87	0	0
697	Calvin Dickinson †	England	2017	2017	2	113	99	37.66	0	0	–	–	4	0
698	Felix Organ ♠	England	2017	present	63	2,262	122*	23.56	4,934	80	6/67	34.42	28	0
699	Sam Northeast ♠	England	2018	2021	38	2,105	169	36.92	0	0	–	–	10	0
700	Hashim Amla	South Africa	2018	2018	5	492	112	54.66	0	0	–	–	2	0
701	Dale Steyn	South Africa	2018	2018	5	65	25	10.83	855	20	5/66	19.10	1	0
702	Ollie Rayner	England	2018	2018	2	0	0	0.00	432	5	4/54	39.20	2	0
703	Oli Soames	England	2018	2019	10	217	62	12.05	0	0	–	–	2	0
704	Keith Barker	England	2019	2025	56	1,946	84	28.61	9,638	179	7/46	24.27	7	0
705	Aiden Markram	South Africa	2019	2019	2	115	63	38.33	0	0	–	–	0	0
706	Aneurin Donald †	Wales	2019	2022	19	968	173	33.37	0	0	–	–	24	0
707	Ajinkya Rahane	India	2019	2019	7	307	119	23.61	0	0	–	–	6	0
708	James Fuller	England	2019	present	64	2,023	78*	24.37	6,853	134	6/37	32.75	20	0
709	Harry Came	England	2019	2020	5	72	23*	14.40	0	0	–	–	1	0
710	Ajeet Singh Dale	England	2020	2020	2	7	6	2.33	126	4	3/20	18.25	0	0
711	Tom Scriven	England	2020	2020	2	84	68	28.00	126	3	2/24	26.33	1	0
712	Scott Currie	Scotland	2020	present	10	191	44*	11.93	1,179	19	4/61	39.42	12	0
713	Mohammad Abbas	Pakistan	2021	2024	47	97	13*	4.04	8,663	180	6/11	19.26	7	0
714	Cameron Steel	England	2021	2021	1	29	15	14.50	0	0	–	–	0	0
715	Nick Gubbins	England	2021	present	74	4,382	201*	36.82	332	3	1/1	78.00	25	0
716	Colin de Grandhomme	New Zealand	2021	2021	2	186	174*	186.00	222	6	4/31	11.33	2	0
717	Tom Prest	England	2021	present	41	1,740	156	28.52	680	8	2/32	60.00	29	0
718	Ben Brown ♠†	England	2022	present	68	3,352	165*	35.28	24	0	–	–	224	7
719	Fletcha Middleton	England	2022	present	44	1,977	116	27.08	24	0	–	–	26	0
720	Toby Albert	England	2022	present	34	1,363	124	23.10	0	0	–	–	32	0
721	Ross Whiteley	England	2022	2022	1	55	55*	–	24	0	–	–	0	0
722	Charlie Mumford	England	2022	2022	1	0	–	–	0	0	–	–	0	0
723	Dominic Kelly	England	2022	2025	2	12	12*	–	295	4	2/55	44.25	1	0
724	John Turner	England	2022	2025	7	22	7	2.44	751	21	5/31	19.85	0	0
725	Harry Petrie	England	2022	2022	1	0	–	–	162	4	3/48	17.75	1	0
726	Jack Campbell	England	2022	2022	1	0	–	–	33	0	–	–	1	0
727	Ali Orr	England	2024	2026	15	634	126	23.48	0	0	–	–	9	0
728	Michael Neser	Australia	2024	2024	1	3	3	3.00	93	2	2/39	27.50	0	0
729	Mark Stoneman	England	2025	2025	7	259	57	21.58	0	0	–	–	2	0
730	Brett Hampton	New Zealand	2025	2025	3	40	26	13.33	329	5	2/61	46.40	1	0
731	Sonny Baker	England	2025	present	14	57	27	4.38	2,155	48	5/45	28.95	7	0
732	Tilak Varma	India	2025	2025	4	358	112	59.66	90	0	–	–	2	0
733	Eddie Jack	England	2025	present	14	234	36	13.76	1,682	32	4/36	36.68	3	0
734	Bjorn Fortuin	South Africa	2025	2025	1	17	15	8.50	118	5	4/30	7.80	0	0
735	Washington Sundar	India	2025	2025	2	136	56	34.00	271	4	3/5	38.50	2	0
736	Jake Lehmann	Australia	2026	present	12	965	133*	48.25	0	0	–	–	12	0
737	Ben Mayes	England	2026	present	9	385	59	22.64	12	0	–	–	5	0
738	Codi Yusuf	South Africa	2026	2026	5	75	20*	9.37	844	6	3/67	83.66	3	0
739	Delano Potgieter	South Africa	2026	2026	3	173	84*	43.25	384	7	3/83	33.42	1	0
740	Andrew Neal	England	2026	present	5	200	47	20.00	840	13	4/98	33.30	2	0
741	Manny Lumsden	England	2026	present	2	72	31	18.00	281	9	5/36	30.77	1	0

== See also ==
- Hampshire County Cricket Club
- List of Hampshire County Cricket Club List A players
- List of Hampshire County Cricket Club Twenty20 players
- List of international cricketers from Hampshire
