= Meaden =

Meaden is a surname. Notable people with the surname include:

- Deborah Meaden (born 1959), English businesswoman
- Henry Meaden (1862–?), English cricketer
- John Meaden, Bishop of Newfoundland 1956–1965
- Levi Meaden (born c.1987), Canadian actor
- Peter Meaden (1941–1978), music publicist, managed the Who
- Terence Meaden (born 1935), British archaeologist
