= H. W. Wright =

English cricketer

Personal information
- Full name: H. W. Wright

Domestic team information
- Years: Team
- 1885: Hampshire

Career statistics
Competition	FC
Matches	1
Runs scored	12
Batting average	6.00
100s/50s	–/–
Top score	12
Balls bowled	140
Wickets	1
Bowling average	70.00
5 wickets in innings	–
10 wickets in match	–
Best bowling	1/70
Catches/stumpings	1/–
- Source: Cricinfo, 5 January 2009

H. W. Wright (full name unknown, date of birth and death unknown) was an English first-class cricketer. Wright made a single first-class appearance for Hampshire in 1885, against the Marylebone Cricket Club.
