= Alfred Pink =

English cricketer and umpire

Personal information
- Full name: Alfred Pink
- Born: 1 June 1853; Fratton, Hampshire, England
- Died: 12 January 1931 (aged 77); Portsmouth, Hampshire, England
- Batting: Right-handed
- Bowling: Right-arm medium

Domestic team information
- Years: Team
- 1885: Hampshire

Career statistics
Competition	First-class
Matches	1
Runs scored	54
Batting average	27.00
100s/50s	–/–
Top score	39
Balls bowled	36
Wickets	1
Bowling average	15.00
5 wickets in innings	–
10 wickets in match	–
Best bowling	1/15
Catches/stumpings	–/–
- Source: Cricinfo, 3 February 2023

Alfred Pink (1 June 1853 – 12 January 1931) was an English first-class cricketer and umpire.

Pink was born in Portsmouth at Fratton in June 1853. He was made a single appearance in first-class cricket for Hampshire against Somerset at Taunton in 1885, which was Hampshire's final season with first-class status until 1894. Batting twice in the match, he was dismissed in Hampshire's first innings by Charles Winter for 15 runs, while in their second innings he was dismissed for 39 runs by the same bowler. With his medium pace bowling, he took the wicket of Francis Terry in Somerset's first innings for the cost of 15 runs. Pink was the first cricketer to be born in Portsmouth to represent Hampshire in first-class cricket. In later life, he was a member of the Harting Cricket Club near Petersfield. In addition to playing cricket, Pink also stood as an umpire in two first-class matches separated by eight years, in matches where Oxford University played the Gentlemen of England in 1888 and A. J. Webbe's XI in 1896. Pink died at Portsmouth in January 1931.
