= Percy Bird =

English cricketer

Personal information
- Full name: Percy John Bird
- Born: 27 May 1877; Northwood, Isle of Wight, England
- Died: 11 November 1942 (aged 65); Freshwater Bay, Isle of Wight, England
- Batting: Left-handed
- Bowling: Slow left-arm orthodox

Domestic team information
- Years: Team
- 1900: Hampshire

Career statistics
Competition	First-class
Matches	1
Runs scored	37
Batting average	18.50
100s/50s	–/–
Top score	28
Catches/stumpings	–/–
- Source: Cricinfo, 2 January 2009

Percy John Bird (27 May 1877 — 11 November 1942) was an English first-class cricketer.

The son of James Binfield Bird, he was born on the Isle of Wight at Northwood in May 1877. He was educated at Cheltenham College, where he played for the cricket eleven. A prominent figure in local cricket on the Isle of Wight, Bird made a single appearance in first-class cricket for Hampshire against Somerset at Southampton in the 1900 County Championship. Batting twice in the match, he was dismissed for 9 runs in Hampshire's first innings by George Gill, while following-on in their second innings he was dismissed for 28 runs by the same bowler. Outside of cricket, he was a well known figure in racing and yachting circles on the Isle of Wight. He died suddenly there at Freshwater Bay in November 1942.
