= Frederick Harold =

English cricketer

Personal information
- Full name: Frederick Vere Harold
- Born: 5 September 1888; Eling, Hampshire, England
- Died: 17 February 1964 (aged 75); Southall, Middlesex, England

Domestic team information
- Years: Team
- 1909–1912: Hampshire

Career statistics
Competition	First-class
Matches	2
Runs scored	16
Batting average	8.00
100s/50s	–/–
Top score	8
Balls bowled	24
Wickets	0
Bowling average	–
5 wickets in innings	–
10 wickets in match	–
Best bowling	–
Catches/stumpings	1/–
- Source: Cricinfo, 12 December 2009

Frederick Vere Harold (5 September 1888 — 17 February 1964) was an English first-class cricketer.

Harold was born in September 1888 at Eling, Hampshire. He made two appearances in first-class cricket for Hampshire; the first came against Derbyshire at Blackwell in the 1909 County Championship, with the second coming against Sussex at Eastbourne in the 1912 County Championship. In these, he scored 16 runs and took no wickets. Harold died in Southall in February 1964.
