= Ian Shield =

English cricketer and soldier

Personal information
- Full name: Ian Noel Ridley Shield
- Born: 24 December 1914; Ayot St Lawrence, Hertfordshire, England
- Died: 22 February 2005 (aged 90); Petersfield, Hampshire, England
- Batting: Left-handed
- Bowling: Right-arm fast-medium

Domestic team information
- Years: Team
- 1939: Hampshire

Career statistics
Competition	First-class
Matches	4
Runs scored	16
Batting average	4.00
100s/50s	–/–
Top score	6
Balls bowled	528
Wickets	4
Bowling average	68.50
5 wickets in innings	–
10 wickets in match	–
Best bowling	2/91
Catches/stumpings	–/–
- Source: Cricinfo, 3 February 2010

Ian Noel Ridley Shield MBE (24 December 1914 – 22 February 2005) was an English first-class cricketer and British Army officer.

Shield was born in December 1914 at Ayot St Lawrence, Hertfordshire. He was educated at Rugby School, before matriculating to Oriel College, Oxford. A club cricketer for the Hampshire Hogs, he took 495 wickets for the club over a 20-year period. His performances at club level bought him to the attention of Hampshire, with him making his first-class debut for the county against Essex at Southampton in the 1939 County Championship. He made three further appearances that season, against Somerset, Glamorgan and Sussex. Although effective as a fast-medium bowler, he was unable to carry that through into first-class cricket, taking just 4 wickets at an average of 68.50, with best figures of 2 for 91. The start of the Second World War in September 1939 bought the cricket season to a premature end. Shield served in the war, being commissioned as a second lieutenant into the Royal Artillery in October 1940 and ended the war as a temporary captain. Following the war, he was made an MBE in January 1946. Shield died at Petersfield in February 2005.
