= H. F. Russell =

English cricketer

Domestic team information
- Years: Team
- 1885: Hampshire

Career statistics
Competition	FC
Matches	1
Runs scored	11
Batting average	5.50
100s/50s	–/–
Top score	10
Balls bowled	–
Wickets	–
Bowling average	–
5 wickets in innings	–
10 wickets in match	–
Best bowling	–
Catches/stumpings	–/–
- Source: Cricinfo, 1 January 2009

H. F. Russell (dates unknown) was an English first-class cricketer.

Russell represented Hampshire in one first-class match in 1885 against Surrey.

Russell's date of death is lost to history.
