= George Passmore (cricketer) =

English cricketer

Personal information
- Born: 5 August 1852; Yealmpton, Devon, England
- Died: 8 February 1935 (aged 82); Oreston, Devon, England
- Batting: Right-handed
- Role: Wicket-keeper

Domestic team information
- Years: Team
- 1896: Hampshire

Career statistics
Competition	First-class
Matches	1
Runs scored	0
Batting average	0.00
100s/50s	–/–
Top score	0
Catches/stumpings	2/1
- Source: Cricinfo, 2 January 2009

George Passmore (5 August 1852 — 8 February 1935) was an English first-class cricketer.

Passmore was born in August 1852 at Yealmpton, Devon. A club cricketer in Southampton for Deanery Cricket Club, Passmore made a single first-class appearance for Hampshire against Yorkshire at Southampton in the 1896 County Championship. Batting at number eleven in the match, he was dismissed in Hampshire's first innings without scoring by Bobby Peel. Behind the stumps, he took two catches and made a single stumping. He later died in his native Devon at Oreston in February 1935.
