= William Dean (Hampshire cricketer) =

Australian-born English cricketer

Domestic team information
- Years: Team
- 1907: Hampshire

Career statistics
Competition	FC
Matches	1
Runs scored	3
Batting average	–
100s/50s	–/–
Top score	3*
Balls bowled	126
Wickets	2
Bowling average	26.00
5 wickets in innings	–
10 wickets in match	–
Best bowling	2/52
Catches/stumpings	2/–
- Source: Cricinfo, 2 January 2010

William Dean (born c. 1882 in Australia; date of death unknown) was an Australian born English cricketer who represented Hampshire in one first-class match in 1907 against the touring South Africans. Dean took two wickets in the South Africans' second innings, dismissing William Shalders LBW and Aubrey Faulkner caught and bowled.
