= H. F. Lowe =

English cricketer

H. F. Lowe (full name and dates unknown) was an English cricketer who played for Hampshire.

Lowe made a single first-class appearance for the team, against Sussex in 1882. Batting in the lower order, Lowe scored a duck in the first innings of the match and did not bat in the second.
