= Richard Carty =

English cricketer

Personal information
- Full name: Richard Arthur Carty
- Born: 28 July 1922; Southampton, Hampshire, England
- Died: 31 March 1984 (aged 61); Bishop's Waltham, Hampshire, England
- Batting: Right-handed
- Bowling: Right-arm fast-medium

Domestic team information
- Years: Team
- 1949–1954: Hampshire

Career statistics
Competition	First-class
Matches	55
Runs scored	798
Batting average	14.77
100s/50s	–/2
Top score	53
Balls bowled	8,619
Wickets	138
Bowling average	30.17
5 wickets in innings	8
10 wickets in match	1
Best bowling	7/29
Catches/stumpings	24/–
- Source: Cricinfo, 13 February 2010

Richard Arthur Carty (28 July 1922 — 31 March 1984) was an English first-class cricketer.

Carty was born at Southampton in July 1922. Following the Second World War, Hampshire were in the process of rebuilding their post-war team under the secretaryship and captaincy of Desmond Eagar. Amongst his aims was to seek local players with which to build a team, with Carty being amongst these new post-war locally produced players. He made his debut in first-class cricket for Hampshire against Oxford University at Bournemouth in 1949, with him making ten appearances in his debut season. His first season proved to be his most successful as a right-arm fast-medium bowler, with him taking 34 wickets at an average of 25.82; he took three five wicket hauls, with best figures of 6 for 110. The following season, he made fifteen appearances and took 31 wickets at an average of 33.29. He became less effective in later seasons, but did record his best match figures of 11 for 117 against Glamorgan in the 1952 County Championship. With Victor Cannings joining Hampshire in 1950, coupled with Carty suffering a number of injuries, his opportunities became limited, and his first-class career thus came to an end following the 1954 season. In 55 first-class appearances for Hampshire, he took 138 wickets at an average of 30.17; he took eight five wicket hauls and ten wickets in a match once. His best innings figures of 7 for 29 came against Oxford University at Basingstoke in 1951. As a lower order batsman, he scored 798 runs at a batting average of 14.77; he made two half centuries, with a highest score of 53. Carty died at Bishop's Waltham in March 1984.
