= William Wild (cricketer) =

English cricketer

Personal information
- Full name: William Wild
- Born: 21 February 1846; Thorncombe, Dorset, England
- Died: 7 January 1891 (aged 44); Norwich, Norfolk, England
- Batting: Right-handed
- Bowling: Right-arm roundarm-fast

Domestic team information
- Years: Team
- 1877: Hampshire

Career statistics
Competition	First-class
Matches	1
Runs scored	10
Batting average	10.00
100s/50s	–/–
Top score	8
Balls bowled	24
Wickets	0
Bowling average	–
5 wickets in innings	–
10 wickets in match	–
Best bowling	–
Catches/stumpings	–/–
- Source: Cricinfo, 14 February 2010

William Wild (21 February 1846 — 7 January 1891) was an English first-class cricketer.

Wild was born in February 1846 at Thorncombe, Dorset. He later made a single appearance in first-class cricket for Hampshire against the Marylebone Cricket Club at Lord's in 1877. Batting twice in the match, he was dismissed for 8 runs by Fred Morley in Hampshire's first innings, while following-on in their second innings he ended Hampshire's innings of 149 all out unbeaten on 2 runs. As a bowler, he was described by the Hampshire Independent as a "Southampton lad, free and graceful delivery, [with] a good pace". Prior to playing first-class cricket for Hampshire, Wild was summoned to Southampton Police Court in October 1869 on charges of assaulting John Gray, a toll collector on the Itchen Bridge. Wild later moved to Norfolk, where he worked as a tailor. He died at his residence in Norwich in January 1891, with his wife informing the coroner that leading up to his death he had been suffering from rheumatic fever.
