= Arthur Kimish =

English cricketer

Personal information
- Full name: Arthur Edwards Kimish
- Born: 5 July 1917; Southampton, Hampshire, England
- Died: May 2001 (aged 83); Warwickshire, England
- Batting: Right-handed
- Relatives: Wicket-keeper

Domestic team information
- Years: Team
- 1946: Hampshire

Career statistics
| Competition | First-class |
|---|---|
| Matches | 3 |
| Runs scored | 18 |
| Batting average | 6.00 |
| 100s/50s | –/– |
| Top score | 12* |
| Catches/stumpings | 3/3 |
- Source: Cricinfo, 30 December 2009

Arthur Edwards Kimish (5 July 1917 — May 2001) was an English first-class cricketer.

Kimish was born at Southampton in July 1917, and was educated there at Taunton's College. A wicket-keeper, he played club cricket for Old Tauntonians, Kimish made his debut in first-class cricket for Hampshire against Leicestershire at Bournemouth in the 1946 County Championship, having been called into the Hampshire side as a replacement for their regular wicket-keeper Neil McCorkell. He made a further two first-class appearances for Hampshire in 1946, both in the County Championship against Lancashire and Surrey. In his three appearances, he scored 18 runs and took three catches and stumpings apiece.

He later moved to Birmingham in the 1960s, where he worked as a manager. Kimish died in Warwickshire in May 2001.
