= Francis Lipscomb =

English cricketer

Personal information
- Full name: Francis Wallis Lipscomb
- Born: 20 July 1834; Alresford, Hampshire, England
- Died: 3 October 1906 (aged 72); Southsea, Hampshire, England
- Batting: Right-handed
- Bowling: Right-arm roundarm slow

Domestic team information
- Years: Team
- 1881–1882: Hampshire

Career statistics
Competition	First-class
Matches	5
Runs scored	121
Batting average	15.12
100s/50s	–/1
Top score	53
Balls bowled	152
Wickets	2
Bowling average	51.50
5 wickets in innings	–
10 wickets in match	–
Best bowling	2/46
Catches/stumpings	–/–
- Source: Cricinfo, 31 January 2010

Francis Wallis Lipscomb (20 July 1834 — 3 October 1906) was an English first-class cricketer and British Army officer.

Lipscomb was born in Alresford in July 1834. He was commissioned into the British Army as an ensign with the 2nd Royal Lanarkshire Militia in November 1855, with promotion to lieutenant following in September 1857. He transferred from the militia to the Royal Irish Regiment in March 1858, being given the commission of ensign upon his transfer to the regular army. He was promoted to lieutenant in April 1859, before being appointed an instructor of musketry in March 1865. Lipscomb retired from active service in May 1867. Shortly thereafter, he returned to the militia with the 3rd Lanarkshire Rifle Volunteer Corps, holding the rank of captain.

Lipscomb made his debut first-class cricket while serving in the army in 1857, debuting for the Gentlemen of England against the Gentlemen of Kent and Sussex at Canterbury in 1857. His next first-class match came in 1862, for the Gentlemen of the South against the Gentlemen of the North at Lord's. After the end of his military career, Lipscomb played first-class cricket for Hampshire, for whom he first appeared for in 1881 against Sussex at the Antelope Ground in Southampton; he played two further first-class matches for Hampshire, making a second appearance in 1881 against Sussex at Hove, before playing against Sussex for a third time at the County Ground in Southampton in 1882. In five first-class matches, Lipscomb scored 121 runs at an average of 15.12, making one half century score of 53. Beginning from the mid–1850s, he played club cricket in Scotland and played for the representative Scottish team as captain in 1870.

Following the end of his military and cricketing endeavours, he became a hops merchant. Lipscomb died at Southsea on 3 October 1906. He was survived by his widow, Sophia.
