= Herbert Shutt =

English cricketer

Personal information
- Full name: Herbert Shutt
- Born: 3 September 1879; Ardwick, Lancashire, England
- Died: 19 November 1922 (aged 43); Whitehaven, Cumberland, England
- Batting: Left-handed
- Bowling: Left-arm fast

Domestic team information
- Years: Team
- 1906: Hampshire

Career statistics
Competition	First-class
Matches	4
Runs scored	7
Batting average	3.50
100s/50s	–/–
Top score	6
Balls bowled	647
Wickets	8
Bowling average	28.87
5 wickets in innings	–
10 wickets in match	–
Best bowling	4/29
Catches/stumpings	–/–
- Source: Cricinfo, 13 February 2010

Herbert Shutt (3 September 1879 – 19 November 1922) was an English first-class cricketer.

Shutt was born in September 1879 at Ardwick, Lancashire. For many years he was a club cricketer in Southern England at Aldershot, with Shutt being selected to play for Hampshire in the 1906 season. He made four first-class appearances during that season, debuting against the touring West Indians and making a further three appearances in the County Championship. Playing as a left-arm fast bowler, he took 8 wickets in his four matches at an average of 28.87, with best figures of 4 for 29. He later returned to the North-West, where he was engaged by Heywood Cricket Club as their professional in 1908. Shutt played minor matches for Cumberland from 1910 to 1914, with a final minor appearance coming in July 1922; he died five months later at Whitehaven on 19 November 1922, with his final words reportedly being "the last ball of the over".
