= Tom Wild =

English cricketer

Personal information
- Full name: Tom Wild
- Born: 4 November 1855; Southampton, Hampshire, England
- Died: 2 May 1921 (aged 65); Southampton, Hampshire, England
- Batting: Unknown

Domestic team information
- Years: Team
- 1880: Hampshire

Career statistics
Competition	First-class
Matches	2
Runs scored	40
Batting average	13.33
100s/50s	–/–
Top score	25
Catches/stumpings	–/–
- Source: Cricinfo, 31 January 2010

Tom Wild (4 November 1855 — 2 May 1921) was an English first-class cricketer.

Wild was born in Southampton in November 1855. He made two appearances in first-class cricket for Hampshire in 1880, against the Marylebone Cricket Club and Sussex, with both matches played at Southampton. In those, he scored 40 runs at an average of 13.33. Wild died in the Bevois Valley area of Southampton in May 1921.
