= Okeover Longcroft =

English cricketer

Personal information
- Full name: Okeover Butler Longcroft
- Born: 6 March 1850; Havant, Hampshire, England
- Died: 7 September 1871 (aged 21); Havant, Hampshire, England
- Batting: Right-handed
- Bowling: Unknown
- Role: Wicket-keeper

Domestic team information
- Years: Team
- 1869–1870: Hampshire

Career statistics
Competition	First-class
Matches	2
Runs scored	28
Batting average	7.00
100s/50s	–/–
Top score	12
Balls bowled	103
Wickets	8
Bowling average	9.37
5 wickets in innings	–
10 wickets in match	–
Best bowling	3/15
Catches/stumpings	1/1
- Source: Cricinfo, 28 December 2009

Okeover Butler Longcroft (6 March 1850 — 7 September 1871) was an English first-class cricketer.

The son of Charles John Longcroft, he was born in the family ancestral home of Hall Place in Havant in March 1850. Longcroft was educated at Bradfield College. He played first-class cricket for Hampshire on two occasions, against the Marylebone Cricket Club in 1869 and Lancashire in 1870, with both matches played at Southampton. Playing as a wicket-keeper, he took a single catch and made a single stumping across his two matches, while with the bat he scored 28 runs with a highest score of 12. He also bowled in both matches, taking 8 wickets at an average of 9.37, with best figures of 3 for 15. Whilst out shooting, Longcroft began to feel unwell. He subsequently died a few days later on 7 September 1871, at Hall Place. His cause of death was registered as typhoid fever.
