= Ian Chivers =

English cricketer

Personal information
- Full name: Ian James Chivers
- Born: 5 November 1964 (age 62); Southampton, Hampshire, England
- Batting: Right-handed
- Bowling: Right-arm off break

Domestic team information
- Years: Team
- 1985–1987: Hampshire

Career statistics
Competition	First-class
Matches	2
Runs scored	20
Batting average	–
100s/50s	–/–
Top score	20*
Balls bowled	150
Wickets	2
Bowling average	38.00
5 wickets in innings	–
10 wickets in match	–
Best bowling	1/4
Catches/stumpings	–/–
- Source: Cricinfo, 12 December 2009

Ian James Chivers (born 5 November 1964) is an English former first-class cricketer.

Chivers was born in November 1964 at Southampton. A club cricketer for Old Tauntonians, Chivers was an off break bowler who was engaged by Hampshire at a time when they possessed the spin bowling options of Nigel Cowley and Rajesh Maru, which limited his appearances to mostly Second XI matches. He made two appearances in first-class cricket for Hampshire, against Oxford University at Oxford in 1985, and against Glamorgan at Swansea in the 1987 County Championship; He took two wickets in these matches. He later played club cricket for Calmore Sports and Winchester Krakatoa Simmarians.
