= Edward Mariner =

English cricketer

Personal information
- Full name: Edward Charles Mariner
- Born: 3 January 1877; Winchester, Hampshire, England
- Died: 10 May 1949 (aged 72); Portsmouth, Hampshire, England
- Batting: Unknown
- Bowling: Unknown

Domestic team information
- Years: Team
- 1896: Hampshire

Career statistics
Competition	First-class
Matches	1
Runs scored	0
Batting average	0.00
100s/50s	–/–
Top score	0
Balls bowled	40
Wickets	0
Bowling average	–
5 wickets in innings	–
10 wickets in match	–
Best bowling	–
Catches/stumpings	–/–
- Source: Cricinfo, 1 February 2010

Edward Charles Mariner (3 January 1877 — 10 May 1949) was an English first-class cricketer.

Mariner was born at Winchester in January 1877. He made a single appearance in first-class cricket for Hampshire against Warwickshire at Southampton in the 1896 County Championship. Batting twice in the match, Mariner was twice dismissed without scoring by Henry Pallett. He also bowled eight wicketless overs across the match. Mariner died in May 1949 at Portsmouth, following a short illness.
