= Albert Pillans =

English cricketer

Personal information
- Full name: Albert Alexander Pillans
- Born: 25 February 1869; Dickoya, British Ceylon
- Died: 28 November 1901 (aged 32); Maskeliya, British Ceylon
- Batting: Right-handed
- Bowling: Unknown

Domestic team information
- Years: Team
- 1896: Hampshire

Career statistics
Competition	First-class
Matches	3
Runs scored	82
Batting average	20.50
100s/50s	–/–
Top score	32*
Balls bowled	339
Wickets	6
Bowling average	25.16
5 wickets in innings	–
10 wickets in match	–
Best bowling	2/31
Catches/stumpings	–/–
- Source: Cricinfo, 13 February 2010

Albert Alexander Pillans (25 February 1869 – 28 November 1901) was an Anglo-Ceylonese first-class cricketer.

The son of Albert Pillans senior and Maria Elphinstone, he was born in British Ceylon at Dickoya in February 1869. In England, he played club cricket for Hampshire Rovers, before making his debut in first-class cricket for Hampshire against Derbyshire at Derby in the 1896 County Championship. He made two further first-class appearances that season, against Yorkshire at Harrogate and Warwickshire at Southampton. In his three matches, Pillans scored 82 runs at an average of 20.50, with a high score of 32 not out. As a bowler, he took 6 wickets at a bowling average of 25.16, with best figures of 2 for 31. He later returned to Ceylon, where he played in a minor match for Ceylon against the touring Australians in 1896. Pillans died from peritonitis in Ceylon at Maskeliya in November 1901.
