= Thomas Page (cricketer, born 1872) =

English cricketer

Personal information
- Full name: Thomas Howard Page
- Born: 28 May 1872; Dover, Kent, England
- Died: 7 December 1953 (aged 81); Swanage, Dorset, England

Domestic team information
- Years: Team
- 1900: Hampshire

Career statistics
Competition	First-class
Matches	2
Runs scored	77
Batting average	25.66
100s/50s	0/1
Top score	61*
Balls bowled	240
Wickets	4
Bowling average	49.50
5 wickets in innings	0
10 wickets in match	0
Best bowling	4/115
Catches/stumpings	3/–
- Source: Cricinfo, 2 January 2009

Thomas Howard Page (28 May 1872 — 7 December 1953) was an English first-class cricketer.

The son of George Page, he was born at Dover in May 1872. He grew up in Southampton and was educated at St Edward's School, Oxford. Page made two appearances in first-class cricket in the 1900 County Championship, against Essex at Leyton and Surrey at Bournemouth. On debut, he scored an unbeaten 61 in Hampshire's first innings, while with the ball he took figures of 4 for 115 runs in Surrey's first innings. He was known to play cricket for the Old St Edward's team. He married Lilian Austen in 1904. Page died at Swanage in December 1953.
