= George Mannings =

English cricketer

Personal information
- Born: 13 October 1843; Downton, Wiltshire, England
- Died: 28 November 1876 (aged 33); Downton, Wiltshire, England

Domestic team information
- Years: Team
- 1864: Hampshire

Career statistics
Competition	First-class
Matches	1
Runs scored	7
Batting average	3.50
100s/50s	0/0
Top score	5
Catches/stumpings	1/–
- Source: Cricinfo, 2 January 2009

George Mannings (13 October 1843 – 28 November 1876) was an English first-class cricketer and medical doctor.

The son of George Mannings senior, he was born in October 1843 at Downton, Wiltshire and was educated at Marlborough College. After completing his education, Mannings became a surgeon for the Peninsular and Oriental Steam Navigation Company (P&O). He played first-class cricket for Hampshire against Middlesex at Islington in 1864, in what was only Hampshire's second first-class match. In a match which Middlesex won by an innings and 38 runs, Mannings was run out for 2 runs in Hampshire's first-innings, while in their second-innings he was dismissed for 5 runs by William Catling. Mannings died at Downton in November 1876.
