= Alfred Parvin =

English cricketer

Personal information
- Full name: Alfred William Parvin
- Born: 31 December 1859; Southampton, Hampshire, England
- Died: 12 July 1916 (aged 56); Brighton, Sussex, England
- Batting: Unknown

Domestic team information
- Years: Team
- 1885: Hampshire

Career statistics
Competition	First-class
Matches	1
Runs scored	11
Batting average	5.50
100s/50s	–/–
Top score	11
Catches/stumpings	1/–
- Source: Cricinfo, 24 January 2010

Alfred William Parvin (31 December 1859 – 12 July 1916) was an English first-class cricketer.

Parvin was born in Southampton in December 1859. He successfully undertook an apprenticeship in 1876 to become a second assistant master at a boys' school in Southampton. Parvin later made a single appearance in first-class cricket for Hampshire in a single first-class match against Kent at Tonbridge in 1885. Batting twice in the match, he was dismissed without scoring by Jimmy Wootton in Hampshire's first innings, while following-on in their second innings he was dismissed for 11 runs by the same bowler. In November 1885, he was elected a fellow of the Royal Geographical Society. Parvin died in Brighton in July 1916.
