= Henry Murgatroyd =

English cricketer

Personal information
- Full name: Henry Murgatroyd
- Born: 19 September 1853; Swindon, Wiltshire, England
- Died: 15 March 1905 (aged 51); Portsmouth, Hampshire, England
- Batting: Right-handed
- Bowling: Right-arm fast

Domestic team information
- Years: Team
- 1883: Hampshire

Career statistics
Competition	First-class
Matches	1
Runs scored	2
Batting average	2.00
100s/50s	–/–
Top score	1*
Balls bowled	24
Wickets	0
Bowling average	–
5 wickets in innings	–
10 wickets in match	–
Best bowling	–
Catches/stumpings	–/–
- Source: Cricinfo, 14 December 2009

Henry Murgatroyd (19 September 1853 – 15 March 1905) was an English first-class cricketer

Murgatroyd was born at Swindon in September 1853. He made a single appearance in first-class cricket for Hampshire against Sussex at Hove in 1883. Batting twice in the match, he was dismissed for a single run in Hampshire's first innings by John Juniper, while in their second innings he was unbeaten on a single run. As a right-arm fast bowler, he went wicketless in the match. Murgatroyd died in Portsmouth in March 1905.
