= Stanley Pearce =

English cricketer

Personal information
- Full name: Stanley Herbert Hicks Pearce
- Born: 21 September 1863; Totton, Hampshire, England
- Died: 5 April 1929 (aged 65); Oswestry, Shropshire, England

Domestic team information
- Years: Team
- 1885: Hampshire

Career statistics
Competition	First-class
Matches	1
Runs scored	18
Batting average	9.00
100s/50s	0/0
Top score	18
Catches/stumpings	0/–
- Source: Cricinfo, 8 January 2010

Stanley Herbert Hicks Pearce (21 September 1863 – 5 May 1929) was an English first-class cricketer.

The son of Henry Stanley Pearce, he was born at Totton in September 1863. He was educated at Winchester College, before matriculating to Jesus College, Cambridge. Pearce was commissioned into the British Army as a lieutenant in the Dorsetshire Regiment in April 1885, before resigning his commission in February 1886. Pearce made a single appearance in first-class cricket for Hampshire against Somerset at Taunton in 1885. Opening the batting twice in the match, he was dismissed in Hampshire's first innings for 18 runs by E. W. Bastard, while in their second innings he was dismissed without scoring by John Challen. Pearce died at Oswestry in May 1929 and was buried at Oswestry Cemetery.
