= Frederick Willoughby =

Scottish-born English cricketer

Personal information
- Full name: Frederick George Willoughby
- Born: 25 April 1862; Edinburgh, Midlothian, Scotland
- Died: 14 April 1952 (aged 89); Eastleigh, Hampshire, England
- Batting: Right-handed
- Bowling: Left-arm medium

Domestic team information
- Years: Team
- 1885: Hampshire
- 1895: Worcestershire

Umpiring information
- FC umpired: 21 (1906)

Career statistics
Competition	First-class
Matches	8
Runs scored	60
Batting average	5.00
100s/50s	–/–
Top score	19
Balls bowled	1,334
Wickets	25
Bowling average	22.56
5 wickets in innings	–
10 wickets in match	–
Best bowling	4/39
Catches/stumpings	5/–
- Source: Cricinfo, 1 January 2010

Frederick George Willoughby (25 April 1862 — 16 April 1952) was a Scottish-born English first-class cricketer.

Willoughby was born at Edinburgh in April 1862. He made his debut in first-class cricket for Hampshire against Derbyshire at Southampton in 1885. He made seven further first-class appearances for Hampshire during that season. Playing in the Hampshire side as a left-arm medium pace bowler, he took 25 wickets at an average of 22.56, with best figures of 4 for 39. As a lower order batsman, he scored 60 runs with a highest score of 19. With Hampshire losing their first-class status following that season, he continued to play minor matches for the county in 1886. Around the as he played first-class cricket for Hampshire, Willoughby founded the now defunct Botley F.C.

Soon after this, he relocated to Malvern to take up the post of cricket coach at Malvern College, where he helped to produce several first-class cricketers. There, he initially began playing minor matches for Worcestershire in 1890, before playing for Worcestershire in their maiden season of minor counties cricket; his sole minor counties appearance came against Hertfordshire in the 1895 Minor Counties Championship. He later stood as an umpire in the Minor Counties Championship in 1904 and 1905, before standing in 21 first-class matches in 1906. Willoughby returned to Hampshire in his latter years, where he was resident at Eastleigh. He died there in April 1952, eleven days short of his 90th birthday.
