= William Lipscomb (cricketer) =

English cricketer and barrister

Personal information
- Full name: William Henry Lipscomb
- Born: 20 November 1846; Winchester, Hampshire, England
- Died: 9 April 1918 (aged 71); Clapham, London, England
- Batting: Right-handed
- Bowling: Right-arm roundarm medium

Domestic team information
- Years: Team
- 1866–1867: Hampshire
- 1868: Oxford University

Career statistics
| Competition | First-class |
|---|---|
| Matches | 7 |
| Runs scored | 154 |
| Batting average | 14.00 |
| 100s/50s | –/– |
| Top score | 34 |
| Balls bowled | 176 |
| Wickets | 3 |
| Bowling average | 33.33 |
| 5 wickets in innings | – |
| 10 wickets in match | – |
| Best bowling | 2/26 |
| Catches/stumpings | 3/– |
- Source: Cricinfo, 25 January 2010

William Henry Lipscomb (20 November 1846 — 9 April 1918) was an English first-class cricketer and barrister.

The eldest son of William Henry Lipscomb, he was born at Winchester in November 1846. He was educated at Marlborough College, where he played for the college cricket team. From there, he matriculated to University College, Oxford in 1865, graduating in 1870. Following the end of his freshman year, Lipscomb made his debut in first-class cricket for Hampshire against Surrey at Southampton. He made three further first-class appearances for Hampshire in 1867, all against Kent. He also played in 1867 for the Gentlemen of the South against the Gentlemen of the North at Islington. A member of the Oxford University Cricket Club, Lipscomb made just first-class appearances for the university, in 1868 against the Marylebone Cricket Club and in The University Match against Cambridge University (which gained him a blue). His overall first-class record saw Lipscomb play in seven matches, scoring 99 runs with a highest score of 34; with his right-arm roundarm medium pace bowling, he took 3 wickets, with best figures of 2 for 26. He was a noted oarsman at Oxford, but did not take part in any of The Boat Race's while there.

A member of Lincoln's Inn, he was called to the bar to practice as a barrister in November 1872. Lipscomb died at Clapham in April 1918.
