= William Martin (English cricketer) =

English cricketer

Personal information
- Born: 19 February 1844; Southampton, Hampshire, England
- Died: 27 May 1871 (aged 27); Southampton, Hampshire, England
- Batting: Right-handed
- Bowling: Right-arm medium

Domestic team information
- Years: Team
- 1867: Hampshire

Career statistics
Competition	First-class
Matches	1
Runs scored	2
Batting average	1.00
100s/50s	–/–
Top score	1
Catches/stumpings	–/–
- Source: Cricinfo, 8 January 2010

William Martin (19 February 1844 — 27 May 1871) was an English first-class cricketer.

Martin was born at Southampton in February 1844. A professional club cricketer for the Southampton Union Club, he made a single appearance in first-class cricket for Hampshire against Kent at Southampton in 1867. Batting twice in the match at number ten and eleven, he was dismissed in Hampshire's first innings for a single run by Edgar Willsher, while in their second innings he was dismissed for the same score by the same bowler. In their first innings, he batted at ten due to the absence of Henry Maturin. Despite occupying the batting positions often reserved for bowlers, he was not called upon to bowl in the match. In the four years following his sole county appearance, he continued to play club cricket in Edinburgh and Southampton. but had also been engaged in Edinburgh. The Hampshire Advertiser described him as "a good batsman and bowler" and "a valuable man in the field". Martin died at his residence, the Adelaide Hotel in Southampton, on 27 May 1871 having suddenly fallen ill; he had been married for two months prior to his death.
