= George Case (cricketer) =

English cricketer and medical doctor

Personal information
- Full name: George Henry Case
- Born: 4 April 1839; Fareham, Hampshire, England
- Died: 21 April 1911 (aged 72); Fareham, Hampshire, England
- Batting: Right-handed
- Bowling: Unknown

Domestic team information
- Years: Team
- 1864: Hampshire

Career statistics
Competition	First-class
Matches	2
Runs scored	85
Batting average	28.33
100s/50s	–/–
Top score	48
Balls bowled	40
Wickets	0
Bowling average	–
5 wickets in innings	–
10 wickets in match	–
Best bowling	–
Catches/stumpings	–/–
- Source: Cricinfo, 9 January 2010

George Henry Case (4 April 1839 – 21 April 1911) was an English first-class cricketer and physician.

Case was born at Fareham in April 1839. He was a physician by profession. Case played two first-class cricket matches for Hampshire in 1864. The first was against Sussex at Southampton, in what was Hampshire's inaugural first-class match. He became the first Hampshire batsman to be listed as absent ill; but probably, as a doctor, he was called away in Hampshire's first innings to a medical emergency. His second first-class appearance of 1864 came against Middlesex at Southampton. He scored 85 runs in his two first-class matches, with a high score of 48. while with the ball he bowled 10 wicketless overs. He was also involved with Hampshire in an administrative capacity, serving on the club's committee. His medical practice began on the Isle of Wight, where he remained until 1862. From there he returned to Fareham, later becoming the towns Medical Officer in 1874. He was a member of the Worshipful Society of Apothecaries, having been appointed in 1860. Case died at Fareham in April 1911.
