= Harry Downer =

English cricketer

Personal information
- Full name: Harry Rodney Downer
- Born: 19 October 1915; Southampton, Hampshire, England
- Died: March 1980 (aged 64–65); Montreal, Quebec, Canada
- Batting: Right-handed

Domestic team information
- Years: Team
- 1946: Hampshire

Career statistics
Competition	First-class
Matches	2
Runs scored	8
Batting average	2.00
100s/50s	–/–
Top score	4
Catches/stumpings	–/–
- Source: Cricinfo, 6 January 2010

Harry Rodney Downer (19 October 1915 – March 1980) was an English first-class cricketer.

Downer was born at Southampton in October 1915. He served in the British Army as a second lieutenant in the Intelligence Corps during the Second World War. Following the war, Downer represented Hampshire in two first class matches in 1946, the first County Championship after the war. He made his debut against Middlesex at Lord's. In this match, he was dismissed for a single run in Hampshire's first innings by Bill Etherington. In their second innings he was dismissed for 4 runs by the same bowler. His second and final first-class match came against Gloucestershire at Southampton. In this match he was dismissed for a duck in Hampshire's first innings by Sam Cook and in their second innings he was run out for 3. His two matches for Hampshire had yielded him 8 runs at a batting average of 2.00. Downer emigrated, along with his wife, to Canada in 1952. There, he went into business and continued to play club cricket, in addition to field hockey, in the Montreal area. He died there from heart disease in March 1980. He was survived by his wife, and their two children.
