= Frank Walkinshaw =

English cricketer

Personal information
- Full name: Frank Walkinshaw
- Born: 28 February 1861; British Hong Kong
- Died: 14 July 1934 (aged 73); Bramley, Hampshire, England
- Batting: Unknown
- Role: Wicket-keeper

Domestic team information
- Years: Team
- 1885: Hampshire

Career statistics
Competition	First-class
Matches	3
Runs scored	15
Batting average	3.00
100s/50s	–/–
Top score	11
Catches/stumpings	4/1
- Source: Cricinfo, 24 January 2010

Frank Walkinshaw JP (28 February 1861 – 14 July 1934) was an English first-class cricketer.

The son of W. Walkinshaw, he was born in British Hong Kong in February 1861. Walkinshaw played first-class cricket for Hampshire on three occasions in 1885, which was Hampshire's last season with first-class status until 1894. His debut came against Surrey at The Oval, before playing against the Marylebone Cricket Club and Derbyshire at Southampton. Playing as a wicket-keeper, he took four catches and made a single stumping, in addition to scoring 15 runs.

Outside of cricket, he was a mechanical engineer by profession. He spent five years in China and Japan between 1886 and November 1891. Walkinshaw was active in civic life in Hartley Wintney in Hampshire, where he was member of the rural council. He was also a justice of the peace for Hampshire. Walkinshaw died in July 1934 at Bramley, Hampshire.
