= Thomas Smith (cricketer, born 1899) =

English cricketer

Personal information
- Full name: Thomas Michael Smith
- Born: 16 May 1899; Lambeth, London, England
- Died: 17 November 1965 (aged 66); Taunton, Somerset, England

Domestic team information
- Years: Team
- 1923–1924: Hampshire

Career statistics
Competition	First-class
Matches	9
Runs scored	89
Batting average	8.90
100s/50s	0/0
Top score	18
Catches/stumpings	3/–
- Source: Cricinfo, 30 June 2023

Thomas Michael Smith (16 May 1899 – 17 November 1965) was an English cricketer who played for Hampshire County Cricket Club during 1923 and 1924.

Smith was born in Lambeth in London and made his first-class cricket debut during the 1923 season, against Glamorgan. He made five appearances in 1923, with a top score of 16 not out. In the following season, he made four appearances, including a top score of 18 in his final appearance for the side, his highest first-class score.

Between 1928 and 1930, Smith made three appearances for a Gold Coast Europeans side, including a top score of 70 runs in his second appearance for the team. He died at Taunton in Somerset in 1965 aged 66.
