= Thomas Sutherland (cricketer) =

English cricketer

Personal information
- Full name: Thomas Sutherland
- Born: 17 February 1880; England
- Died: Unknown
- Batting: Right-handed
- Bowling: Right-arm fast

Domestic team information
- Years: Team
- 1898–1899: Hampshire

Career statistics
Competition	First-class
Matches	9
Runs scored	74
Batting average	14.80
100s/50s	–/–
Top score	21
Balls bowled	767
Wickets	11
Bowling average	40.54
5 wickets in innings	1
10 wickets in match	–
Best bowling	6/111
Catches/stumpings	6/–
- Source: Cricinfo, 18 January 2010

Thomas Sutherland (born 17 February 1880 — date of death unknown) was an English first-class cricketer.

Sutherland made his debut in first-class cricket for Hampshire against Warwickshire at Southampton in the 1898 County Championship. He played first-class cricket for Hampshire until 1899, making nine appearances. Playing as a right-arm fast-bowler, he took 11 wickets at an average of 40.54; his one bowling performance of note came on debut against Warwickshire, with him taking 6 for 111 in their first innings, but thereafter he struggled to take wickets. Sutherland's date and place of death is currently unknown.
