= Charlie Mumford =

English cricketer

Personal information
- Full name: Charles Simon Mumford
- Born: 30 May 2004 (age 22); Watford, Hertfordshire, England
- Batting: Right-handed
- Role: Wicket-keeper

Domestic team information
- Years: Team
- 2022: Hampshire (squad no. 21)
- 2023: Hertfordshire

Career statistics
Competition	First-class
Matches	1
Runs scored	0
Batting average	–
100s/50s	–/–
Top score	–
Catches/stumpings	0/0
- Source: Cricinfo, 21 July 2025

Charles Simon Mumford (born 30 May 2004) is an English former cricketer.

== Career ==
Mumford was born in Watford in May 2004. He was educated at Bedford School. A right-handed wicket-keeper batsman, Mumford joined the cricket academy at Hampshire as a 14-year-old. In 2021, following a good season at Bedford, he was selected by the England and Wales Cricket Board to take part in the ECB U19 'Super 4s' competition at Loughborough. He was a member of Hampshire's 2021 Second XI Championship winning team. In 2022, he made his only senior appearance for Hampshire in a first-class match against a Sri Lanka Cricket Development XI at the Rose Bowl; he was not called upon to bat during the match. Mumford was released by Hampshire at the end of the 2022 season, and subsequently played club cricket for St Cross Symondians in the Southern Cricket League.

Mumford played national counties cricket for Hertfordshire in the 2023. He made three appearances in the National Counties Championship, and five in the National Counties T20 Competition. He was a member of Hertfordshire's squad for the competition's finals day at Tring, where he featured in Hertfordshire's semi-final defeat to Cornwall. He later studied at the University of Exeter, where he played for the university cricket club in a friendly match against Somerset in 2024.

== External list ==
- Charlie Mumford at Cricinfo
