= James Down (cricketer) =

English cricketer

Personal information
- Full name: James Herbert Down
- Born: 11 July 1895; Seaton, Yorkshire, England
- Died: 16 January 1958 (aged 62); Birmingham, Warwickshire, England
- Batting: Left-handed
- Bowling: Slow left-arm orthodox

Domestic team information
- Years: Team
- 1914: Hampshire

Career statistics
Competition	First-class
Matches	2
Runs scored	32
Batting average	16.00
100s/50s	–/–
Top score	31*
Balls bowled	96
Wickets	1
Bowling average	53.00
5 wickets in innings	–
10 wickets in match	–
Best bowling	1/33
Catches/stumpings	–/–
- Source: Cricinfo, 9 January 2026

James Herbert Down (11 July 1895 — 16 January 1958) was an English first-class cricketer.

Down was born in Seaton in July 1895. He was educated in Hampshire at the Winchester College Choir School. A left-handed batsman and slow left-arm orthodox bowler, Down was a member of the groundstaff at Lord's. He was afforded a trial by Hampshire in 1914, making his debut in first-class cricket as cover for the injured George Brown against Sussex at Horsham in the 1914 County Championship; he played a second Championship match in 1914, against Worcestershire at Dudley. His two matches yielded him 32 runs and took a single wicket. Down died in Birmingham in January 1958.
