= Francis Walton =

English first-class cricketer (1832–1871)

Personal information
- Born: c. 1832; England
- Died: 14 July 1871 (aged 40); Surbiton, Surrey, England
- Batting: Right-handed
- Bowling: Right-arm roundarm fast

Domestic team information
- Years: Team
- 1864–1866: Hampshire

Career statistics
Competition	First-class
Matches	3
Runs scored	55
Batting average	11.00
100s/50s	–/–
Top score	16
Balls bowled	268
Wickets	6
Bowling average	27.50
5 wickets in innings	–
10 wickets in match	–
Best bowling	3/48
Catches/stumpings	1/–
- Source: Cricinfo, 16 January 2010

Francis Walton (c. 1832 – 14 July 1871) was an English first-class cricketer and Royal Marines officer.

Walton was born in England in about 1832. Walton was commissioned as a second lieutenant in the Royal Marines in February 1849. He served in the Crimean War, for which he was later decorated by the Ottoman Empire in April 1858 with the Order of the Medjidie, 5th Class. Following the war, he gained promotion to first lieutenant in January 1853. A further promotion to captain followed in December 1860, before being appointed an adjutant in the 48th Middlesex Rifle Volunteer Corps in September 1863. Walton played first-class cricket for Hampshire, debuting in the 1864 season against Middlesex at Islington. He made two further first-class appearances, in 1865 against Middlesex at Islington, and the Marylebone Cricket Club at Lord's in 1866. He scored 55 runs in his three first-class matches with a highest score of 16, while with his right-arm roundarm fast bowling, he took 6 wickets at an average of 27.50, with best figures of 3 for 48. In the mid-1860s, Walton was in a business partnership with Thomas Linklater Thomson as sailmakers and ship chandlers at Wapping, though by March 1867 the partnership had been dissolved by mutual consent. Walton died at his brother's residence in Surbiton on 14 July 1871.
