= Thomas Wilson (cricketer, born 1841) =

English cricketer

Personal information
- Full name: Thomas Henry Wilson
- Born: 10 June 1841; Cheltenham, Gloucestershire, England
- Died: 31 January 1929 (aged 87); Bedford, Bedfordshire, England
- Batting: Unknown
- Role: Occasional wicket-keeper

Domestic team information
- Years: Team
- 1869: Marylebone Cricket Club
- 1870: Hampshire

Career statistics
Competition	First-class
Matches	3
Runs scored	23
Batting average	3.83
100s/50s	–/–
Top score	9
Catches/stumpings	–/1
- Source: Cricinfo, 14 February 2010

Thomas Henry Wilson (10 June 1841 – 31 January 1929) was an English first-class cricketer.

Wilson was born at Cheltenham in June 1841. He began playing representative county cricket in minor matches for Huntingdonshire between 1862 and 1869. He later played first-class cricket, making his first-class debut for the Marylebone Cricket Club against Hampshire at Southampton in 1869. The following season, he made two first-class appearances for Hampshire against Lancashire at Old Trafford and Southampton. In three first-class matches, he scored 23 runs at an average of 3.23, while keeping-wicket he made a single stumping. Wilson died in Bedford on 31 January 1929, with his funeral taking place at the Holy Trinity Church in Bedford.
