= Robert Thorne (cricketer) =

English cricketer

Personal information
- Born: 1 March 1860; Southampton, Hampshire, England
- Died: 11 February 1930 (aged 69); Bitterne Park, Hampshire, England

Domestic team information
- Years: Team
- 1883: Hampshire

Career statistics
Competition	First-class
Matches	2
Runs scored	9
Batting average	2.25
100s/50s	0/0
Top score	6
Catches/stumpings	0/–
- Source: Cricinfo, 8 January 2010

Robert Thorne (1 March 1860 — 11 February 1930) was an English first-class cricketer.

Thorne was born at Southampton in March 1860. He made two appearances in first-class cricket for Hampshire in 1883, both against Sussex at Hove and Southampton respectively. In his two appearances, he scored 9 runs with a highest score of 6. Thorne died at Bitterne Park in Southampton on 11 February 1930.
