= Philip Thresher =

English cricketer and barrister

Personal information
- Full name: Philip Thresher
- Born: 1 March 1844; Hamble-le-Rice, Hampshire, England
- Died: 11 April 1883 (aged 39); Shepherd's Bush, London, England
- Batting: Unknown
- Bowling: Unknown

Domestic team information
- Years: Team
- 1865–1869: Hampshire

Career statistics
Competition	First-class
Matches	5
Runs scored	93
Batting average	11.62
100s/50s	–/–
Top score	47*
Balls bowled	36
Wickets	1
Bowling average	19.00
5 wickets in innings	–
10 wickets in match	–
Best bowling	1/19
Catches/stumpings	–/–
- Source: Cricinfo, 26 January 2010

Philip Thresher (1 March 1844 – 11 April 1883) was an English first-class cricketer and barrister.

The son of The Reverend Philip Thresher senior, he was born in March 1844 at Hamble-le-Rice. He was educated at Winchester College, before matriculating to University College, Oxford. Thresher made his debut in first-class cricket for Hampshire against Surrey at Southampton in 1865. He played first-class cricket for Hampshire until 1869, making five appearances. He scored 93 runs in his five first-class matches, at an average of 11.62 and with a highest score of 47 not out. Thresher joined the West Kent Cricket Club in the late 1860s, an association which he would maintain until 1875 when he became stricken by ill-health. A student of the Inner Temple, he was called to the bar to practice as a barrister in 1868. Thresher died, unmarried, in April 1883 at Shepherd's Bush.
