= Arthur Hayward =

English cricketer

Personal information
- Full name: Arthur John Hayward
- Batting: Right-handed
- Bowling: Leg-break googly

Domestic team information
- Years: Team
- 1925–1926: Hampshire

Career statistics
Competition	FC
Matches	4
Runs scored	17
Batting average	4.25
100s/50s	–/–
Top score	10
Balls bowled	–
Wickets	–
Bowling average	–
5 wickets in innings	–
10 wickets in match	–
Best bowling	–
Catches/stumpings	–/–
- Source: Cricinfo, 7 February 2010

Arthur John Hayward (born 12 September 1905, date of death unknown) was an English first-class cricketer. Hayward was a right-handed batsman who bowled leg-break googly. He was born in Christchurch, Hampshire.

Hayward represented Hampshire in four first-class matches, the first of which came in 1925 against Middlesex. Hayward's final first-class match came in 1926 against Northamptonshire.

Hayward's date of death is unknown.
