= Walter Wheeler (cricketer) =

English cricketer

Personal information
- Full name: Walter Charles Wheeler
- Born: 30 December 1841; Newport, Isle of Wight, England
- Died: 10 October 1907 (aged 65); Kennington, London, England
- Batting: Right-handed
- Bowling: Right-arm roundarm medium

Domestic team information
- Years: Team
- 1873: Middlesex
- 1875: Surrey
- 1878–1880: Hampshire

Career statistics
Competition	First-class
Matches	10
Runs scored	80
Batting average	4.44
100s/50s	–/–
Top score	15
Balls bowled	696
Wickets	14
Bowling average	23.64
5 wickets in innings	1
10 wickets in match	–
Best bowling	6/133
Catches/stumpings	2/–
- Source: Cricinfo, 21 January 2010

Walter Charles Wheeler (30 December 1841 – 10 October 1907) was an English first-class cricketer.

The son of John Wheeler and Emma Wadham, he was born in December 1841 at Newport on the Isle of Wight. He first played first-class cricket in 1873, when he made a single appearance for Middlesex against Surrey at The Oval. The following season, he played for the Players of the South against the Gentlemen of the South. He played first-class cricket for Surrey in 1875, making four appearances; in these, he took 5 wickets. Three years would elapse before Wheeler next appeared in first-class cricket, when he played twice for Hampshire against Kent and Derbyshire; against Kent, he claimed his only career five wicket haul when he took 6 for 133 in Kent's first innings. Two years later in 1880, he made a final first-class appearance for Hampshire against Sussex at Hove. In ten first-class matches, he took 14 wickets at an average with his right-arm roundarm medium pace bowling. As a lower order batsman, he scored 80 runs at a batting average of 4.44. In club cricket, he played for Cheam and won the Surrey Cup with them in 1881. Wheeler died at Kennington in October 1907.
