= William Judd (English cricketer) =

English cricketer and umpire

Personal information
- Full name: William Judd
- Born: 23 October 1845; Bramshaw, Hampshire, England
- Died: 12 March 1925 (aged 79); Boscombe, Hampshire, England
- Batting: Right-handed
- Bowling: Unknown

Domestic team information
- Years: Team
- 1878: Hampshire

Umpiring information
- FC umpired: 1 (1877)

Career statistics
Competition	First-class
Matches	1
Runs scored	8
Batting average	4.00
100s/50s	0/0
Top score	7
Balls bowled	164
Wickets	1
Bowling average	50.00
5 wickets in innings	0
10 wickets in match	0
Best bowling	1/22
Catches/stumpings	0/–
- Source: CricInfo, 28 October 2012

William George Judd (23 October 1845 — 12 March 1925) was an English first-class cricketer.

Judd was born in October 1845 at Bramshaw, Hampshire. Judd later made a single appearance in first-class cricket for Hampshire against Kent at Southampton in 1878. Batting twice in the match from the tail, he was dismissed for 7 runs in Hampshire's first innings by George Hearne, while in their second innings he was dismissed for a single run by Charlie Absolom. With the ball, he took a single wicket in the match, that of Francis MacKinnon. A year prior to this match, Judd had stood as an umpire between Hampshire and Derbyshire in 1877. He died at Boscombe in March 1925.
