= Charles Yaldren =

English cricketer (1891–1916)

Personal information
- Full name: Charles Henry Yaldren
- Born: 8 December 1891; Southampton, Hampshire, England
- Died: 23 October 1916 (aged 24); Thiepval, Picardy, France
- Batting: Right-handed
- Bowling: Unknown

Domestic team information
- Years: Team
- 1912: Hampshire

Career statistics
Competition	First-class
Matches	1
Runs scored	8
Batting average	8.00
100s/50s	–/–
Top score	8
Balls bowled	66
Wickets	1
Bowling average	60.00
5 wickets in innings	–
10 wickets in match	–
Best bowling	1/52
Catches/stumpings	–/–
- Source: Cricinfo, 12 December 2009

Charles Henry Yaldren (8 December 1891 – 23 October 1916) was an English first-class cricketer and soldier.

The son of Charles Henry Yaldren senior, he was born at Southampton in December 1891. He made a single appearance in first-class cricket for Hampshire against Cambridge University at Southampton in 1912. Described as a "useful bowler and tail-end bat", he was run out for 8 runs in his only first-class innings, while with his bowling he took one wicket in the match, that of Geoffrey Hopley. Yaldren served in the First World War as a private in the 1st Battalion, Royal Hampshire Regiment. He was killed in action at Thiepval on 23 October 1916, during the First Battle of the Somme. His body was never recovered, but he is commemorated at the Thiepval Memorial.
