= Sampson Tubb =

English cricketer

Personal information
- Born: 11 October 1840; Broughton, Hampshire, England
- Died: 27 January 1891 (aged 50); Salisbury, Wiltshire, England
- Batting: Right-handed
- Bowling: Right-arm roundarm fast

Domestic team information
- Years: Team
- 1864–1867: Hampshire

Career statistics
Competition	First-class
Matches	10
Runs scored	170
Batting average	12.14
100s/50s	–/–
Top score	24*
Balls bowled	2,726
Wickets	37
Bowling average	20.16
5 wickets in innings	2
10 wickets in match	–
Best bowling	7/32
Catches/stumpings	5/–
- Source: Cricinfo, 24 December 2009

Sampson Tubb (11 October 1840 — 27 January 1891) was an English first-class cricketer.

Tubb was born in October 1840 at Broughton, Hampshire. He made his debut in first-class cricket for Hampshire County Cricket Club in its inaugural first-class match against Sussex at Southampton in 1864. He played first-class cricket for Hampshire until 1867, making ten appearances. In these matches, Tubb scored 170 runs at an average of 12.14, with a highest score of 24 not out. With his right-arm roundarm fast bowling, he took 37 wickets at a bowling average of 20.16;he took two five wicket hauls, with best figures of 7 for 32 against Surrey in 1865. In later life, Tubb spent his time living between Salisbury and Southsea, and was employed as a bookmaker. He died at the West End Hotel in Salisbury in January 1891. His name at death was registered as Samson Tubb.
