= Henry Persse =

English cricketer

Personal information
- Full name: Henry Wilfred Persse
- Born: 19 September 1885; Portswood, Hampshire, England
- Died: 28 June 1918 (aged 32) near Saint-Omer, Pas-de-Calais, France
- Batting: Right-handed
- Bowling: Right-arm fast

Domestic team information
- Years: Team
- 1905–1909: Hampshire

Career statistics
Competition	First-class
Matches	51
Runs scored	889
Batting average	11.69
100s/50s	–/3
Top score	71
Balls bowled	6,993
Wickets	127
Bowling average	30.02
5 wickets in innings	3
10 wickets in match	–
Best bowling	6/64
Catches/stumpings	40/–
- Source: Cricinfo, 20 February 2010

Henry Wilfred Persse MC & Bar (19 September 1885 — 28 June 1918) was an English first-class cricketer and an officer in the British Army.

The son of the soldier Edward Persse and his wife, Margaret, he was born in the Southampton suburb of Portswood in September 1885. Persse made his debut in first-class cricket for Hampshire County Cricket Club against Surrey at The Oval in the 1905 County Championship, with him making thirteen first-class appearances that season. He took 39 wickets with his right-arm fast bowling in 1905, at an average of 34.25; amongst these was his maiden five wicket haul of 5 for 39 against Northamptonshire. He did not feature for Hampshire in 1906, but returned to play in 1907, when he had his most successful season. In 22 matches, he took 60 wickets at an average of 23.20; he took two five wicket hauls, with career-best figures of 6 for 64 against Leicestershire. In addition to performing well with the ball, he also scored 571 runs at a batting average of 16.79, with three half centuries. Over the next two years, Persse featured less for Hampshire, making ten and six appearances respectively in 1908 and 1909. He was less effective with the ball, taking 18 wickets at an average of 39.38 in 1908 and 10 wickets at an average of 37.60 in 1909. In total, he made 51 first-class appearances for Hampshire. In these, he took 127 wickets at an average of 30.02, whilst with the bat, he scored 889 runs at an average of 11.69.

Persse's first-class career finished in 1909, with the reason given being he was travelling abroad. He went to Siam, where he worked for the Siam Forest Company. Persse later returned to England to serve in the First World War, with him being commissioned into the Royal Fusiliers as a probationary second lieutenant in August 1914. He was confirmed in that rank in March 1915, with promotion to lieutenant following in May 1915. Persse was awarded the Military Cross (MC) in January 1916, with a bar being added to his MC in June 1917. Between his MC awards, he had been made a temporary captain in August 1916, with him gaining the full rank in September of the same year. He was made an acting major in April 1917, while serving at headquarters. Persse was twice wounded in action during the war, with his second wounding, which occurred on the Western Front near Saint-Omer on 28 June 1918, proving to be fatal. His brother, Edward, was killed in action four months later.
