= Kenneth Paver =

English cricketer

Personal information
- Full name: Kenneth Edwin Paver
- Born: 4 October 1903; Dover, Kent, England
- Died: 20 November 1975 (aged 72); Ringwood, Hampshire, England

Domestic team information
- Years: Team
- 1925–1926: Hampshire

Career statistics
| Competition | First-class |
|---|---|
| Matches | 2 |
| Runs scored | 52 |
| Batting average | 13.00 |
| 100s/50s | 0/0 |
| Top score | 26 |
| Catches/stumpings | 2/– |
- Source: Cricinfo, 10 January 2010

Kenneth Edwin Paver (4 October 1903 – 20 November 1975) was an English first-class cricketer.

Paver was born at Dover in October 1903. He later made two appearances in first-class cricket for Hampshire, playing once each in the 1925 County Championship and the 1926 County Championship, against Northamptonshire and Somerset respectively, with both matches played at Portsmouth. In these, he scored 52 runs. Paver was active in club cricket in the Portsmouth area, playing for Southsea, Havant Cricket Club, and Hampshire Rovers. He later played for Chichester Priory Park, just across the county border in Sussex. Paver died at Ringwood in November 1975.
