= Richard Court (cricketer) =

English cricketer

Personal information
- Full name: Richard Charles Lucy Court
- Born: 23 October 1916; Ambala, Punjab, British India
- Died: 10 April 1974 (aged 57); Southampton, Hampshire, England
- Batting: Right-handed
- Bowling: Right-arm fast

Domestic team information
- Years: Team
- 1937–1939: Hampshire

Career statistics
Competition	First-class
Matches	18
Runs scored	224
Batting average	10.18
100s/50s	–/–
Top score	35
Balls bowled	2,273
Wickets	33
Bowling average	37.21
5 wickets in innings	–
10 wickets in match	–
Best bowling	4/51
Catches/stumpings	8/–
- Source: Cricinfo, 13 February 2010

Richard Charles Lucy Court (23 October 1916 — 10 April 1974) was an English first-class cricketer.

Court was born in British India at Ambala in October 1916. He joined Hampshire's ground staff in 1936, making his first-class debut for the county the following season against Lancashire at Old Trafford in the County Championship. He played first-class cricket for Hampshire until 1939, making eighteen appearances. Playing in the Hampshire side as a right-arm fast bowler, he took 33 wickets at an average of 37.21, with best figures of 4 for 51. As a lower order batsman, he scored 224 runs at a batting average of 10.18, with a highest score of 35.

With the start of the Second World War in September 1939, county cricket was cancelled for the foreseeable future, bringing to an end Court's first-class career. During the war, he served in the British Army. He died at Southampton in 10 April 1974.
