= Harry Redhouse =

English cricketer (1880–1959)

Personal information
- Born: 27 March 1880; Brompton, Kent, England
- Died: 3 December 1959 (aged 79); England

Domestic team information
- Years: Team
- 1900: Hampshire

Career statistics
Competition	First-class
Matches	1
Runs scored	4
Batting average	2.00
100s/50s	0/0
Top score	4
Balls bowled	18
Wickets	0
Bowling average	–
5 wickets in innings	–
10 wickets in match	–
Best bowling	–
Catches/stumpings	1/–
- Source: Cricinfo, 13 January 2024

Harry Redhouse (27 March 1880 — 3 December 1959) was an English first-class cricketer.

Redhouse was born in March 1880 at Brompton, Kent. A club cricketer for Liphook Cricket Club, Redhouse made a single appearance in first-class cricket for Hampshire against Lancashire at Old Trafford in the 1900 County Championship. Batting twice in the match, he was dismissed without scoring in Hampshire's first innings by Sidney Webb, while in their second innings he was dismissed for 4 runs by Willis Cuttell; the match resulted in a heavy 265 runs defeat for Hampshire. Redhouse died in December 1959.
