= Valentine Simpson =

English cricketer

Personal information
- Born: 15 August 1849; Newington, Surrey, England
- Died: 2 November 1915 (aged 66); Fareham, Hampshire, England

Domestic team information
- Years: Team
- 1885: Hampshire

Career statistics
| Competition | First-class |
|---|---|
| Matches | 1 |
| Runs scored | 10 |
| Batting average | 5.00 |
| 100s/50s | 0/0 |
| Top score | 7 |
| Catches/stumpings | 2/– |
- Source: Cricinfo, 29 July 2023

Valentine Simpson (15 August 1849 – 2 November 1915) was an English first-class cricketer.

The son of John Henry Simpson, he was born at Newington in August 1859. A club cricketer for Reigate Priory Cricket Club, he later made a single appearance in first-class cricket for Hampshire against Kent at Southampton in 1885. Batting twice in the match, he was dismissed for 7 runs in Hampshire's first innings by Alec Hearne, while in their second innings he was dismissed by Jimmy Wootton. Outside of cricket, Simpson was a pastoral farmer. He farmed a herd of roughly sixty Jersey and Guernsey cattle, which he sold in February 1883, alongside Albany Farm near Fareham. He was a member of the Royal Agricultural Society of England, having been elected in 1873. He was also associated as a club cricketer with Fareham Cricket Club, where he was described as "Fareham's Jessop" and was described by the Hampshire Post and Southsea Observer as being a "forcing bat, with an eye like a hawk, and hardly ever known to miss a catch". Simpson died at Fareham in November 1915.
