= William Paris =

English cricketer

Personal information
- Full name: William Paris
- Born: 29 April 1838; Old Alresford, Hampshire, England
- Died: 12 January 1915 (aged 76); Winchester, Hampshire, England
- Batting: Right-handed
- Bowling: Right-arm roundarm

Domestic team information
- Years: Team
- 1875–1881: Hampshire

Umpiring information
- FC umpired: 1 (1878)

Career statistics
Competition	First-class
Matches	6
Runs scored	81
Batting average	8.10
100s/50s	–/1
Top score	51*
Balls bowled	116
Wickets	5
Bowling average	10.40
5 wickets in innings	–
10 wickets in match	–
Best bowling	3/28
Catches/stumpings	–/–
- Source: Cricinfo, 31 December 2009

William Paris (29 April 1838 — 12 January 1915) was an English first-class cricketer.

Paris was born at Old Alresford in April 1838. A professional cricketer, he founded and played for Winchester Cricket Club, in addition to playing for Alresford Cricket Club. He made his debut in first-class cricket for Hampshire against Kent at Catford in 1875. He played first-class cricket for Hampshire until 1876, making five appearances, later returning in 1881 to play a single match against the Marylebone Cricket Club. In these, he scored 81 runs at an average of 8.10; he made one half century, an unbeaten score of 51 on debut. With his right-arm roundarm bowling, he took 5 wickets at a bowling average of 10.40, with best figures of 3 for 28. In addition to playing, Paris also stood as an umpire in a first-class match between Hampshire and Kent at Southampton in 1878.

Paris was a popular figure in Winchester, with a smoking concert and presentation in his honour being held in the city at The George Hotel in December 1889. He was active with the church, spending 25 years as warden of Holy Trinity Church, Winchester. Paris died at Winchester in January 1915; his widow, Amy, survived him by fourteen years.
