= Reginald Fisher (cricketer) =

English cricketer

Personal information
- Full name: Reginald Wordsworth Cecil Fisher
- Born: 17 April 1872; Stoke Rochford, Lincolnshire, England
- Died: 31 December 1939 (aged 67); Hemel Hempstead, Hertfordshire, England
- Batting: Right-handed

Domestic team information
- Years: Team
- 1898: Hampshire

Career statistics
Competition	First-class
Matches	1
Runs scored	3
Batting average	3.00
100s/50s	–/–
Top score	3
Catches/stumpings	–/–
- Source: Cricinfo, 24 January 2010

Reginald Wordsworth Cecil Fisher (17 April 1872 — 31 December 1939) was an English first-class cricketer.

The son of The Reverend Cecil Edward Fisher, he was born in April 1872 at Stoke Rochford, Lincolnshire. Fisher was educated at Haileybury, where he played for the college cricket team and represented the college in middleweight boxing. From there, he matriculated to Keble College, Oxford. He became an assistant master after graduating from Oxford, eventually teaching at a preparatory school. Fisher made a single appearance in first-class cricket for Hampshire against Lancashire at Old Trafford in the 1898 County Championship. Batting once in the match, he was dismissed for 3 runs in Hampshire's first innings by Johnny Briggs. Fisher died at Hemel Hempstead in December 1939.
