= George Gutteres =

English cricketer

Personal information
- Full name: George Gilbert Gutteres
- Born: 11 October 1859; Kensington, London, England
- Died: 2 March 1898 (aged 38); Algiers, French Algeria
- Batting: Right-handed

Domestic team information
- Years: Team
- 1881: Oxford University
- 1882: Hampshire

Career statistics
Competition	First-class
Matches	3
Runs scored	111
Batting average	37.00
100s/50s	–/–
Top score	34*
Catches/stumpings	4/–
- Source: Cricinfo, 26 January 2010

George Gilbert Gutteres (11 October 1859 – 2 March 1898) was an English first-class cricketer and clergyman.

The son of George Gutteres, he was born at Kensington in October 1859. He was educated at Winchester College, before matriculating to Oriel College, Oxford. While studying at Oxford, Gutteres made two appearances in first-class cricket for Oxford University Cricket Club in 1881 against the Gentlemen of England and the Old Oxonians, with both matches played at Oxford. The following year he made a single first-class appearance for Hampshire against Somerset at Taunton. He scored 111 runs in his three first-class matches, at an average of exactly 37.00 and a highest score of 34 not out. Outside of cricket, Gutteres was ordained as a deacon at Ely Cathedral in 1884, having attended the Ely Theological College prior to his ordination. He was appointed curate at St Paul's in Bedford in 1884, a post which he held until 1886 when he was appointed curate at St John's Church in Torquay. In 1892, he was appointed reverend at Plymtree until 1897, prior to becoming reverend of Carlton Colville in Suffolk. Gutteres died in French Algeria at Algiers from influenza in March 1898.
