= Edward Tolfree =

English cricketer

Personal information
- Full name: Edward Tolfree
- Born: 12 July 1881; Southampton, Hampshire, England
- Died: 20 March 1966 (aged 84); West End, Hampshire, England
- Batting: Unknown
- Bowling: Unknown

Domestic team information
- Years: Team
- 1906–1919: Hampshire

Career statistics
Competition	First-class
Matches	5
Runs scored	53
Batting average	8.83
100s/50s	–/–
Top score	22*
Balls bowled	324
Wickets	2
Bowling average	92.50
5 wickets in innings	–
10 wickets in match	–
Best bowling	2/13
Catches/stumpings	–/–
- Source: Cricinfo, 17 January 2010

Edward Tolfree (12 July 1881 – 20 March 1966) was an English first-class cricketer.

The son of Edward Tolfree, he was born at Southampton in July 1881. Tolfree made his debut in first-class cricket for Hampshire against the touring West Indians at Southampton in 1906, in what was his only appearance of that season. A single first-class appearance followed the following season against Warwickshire in the County Championship, followed by two further appearances in the 1909 County Championship against Surrey and Leicestershire. Tolfree returned to play for Hampshire following the end of the First World War, making his only post-war appearance against Middlesex at Lord's in the 1919 County Championship; his return to playing for Hampshire was likely necessitated by the impact the war had on Hampshire cricket, with many of its leading pre-war players being killed in action during the war. In five first-class appearances, Tolfree scored 53 runs with a highest score of 22 not out, while with the ball he took 2 wickets.

By profession, he was a property auctioneer in Southampton. Tolfree died in the Southampton suburb of West End in March 1966.
