= George Cull =

English cricketer

Personal information
- Full name: George Cull
- Born: 3 March 1856; Lymington, Hampshire, England
- Died: 9 May 1898 (aged 42); Sandown, Isle of Wight, England
- Batting: Right-handed
- Role: Wicket-keeper

Domestic team information
- Years: Team
- 1877: Hampshire

Career statistics
| Competition | First-class |
|---|---|
| Matches | 2 |
| Runs scored | 14 |
| Batting average | 3.50 |
| 100s/50s | –/– |
| Top score | 7 |
| Catches/stumpings | 1/– |
- Source: Cricinfo, 19 January 2010

George Cull (3 March 1856 — 9 May 1898) was an English first-class cricketer.

Cull was born at Lymington in March 1856. A club cricketer for Ringwood Cricket Club, he made two appearances in first-class cricket for Hampshire in 1877, against the Marylebone Cricket Club at Lord's and Derbyshire at Southampton. He scored 14 runs in his two matches, with a highest score of 7. Although he was a wicket-keeper at club level, in his two matches for Hampshire, Hector Hyslop was preferred as wicket-keeper. Cull spent the final twenty years of his life working as a postman on the Isle of Wight, where he died at Sandown in May 1898.
