= Henry Meaden =

English cricketer

Personal information
- Full name: Henry J.B. Meaden

Domestic team information
- Years: Team
- 1881: Hampshire

Career statistics
Competition	FC
Matches	3
Runs scored	20
Batting average	4.00
100s/50s	–/–
Top score	9*
Balls bowled	–
Wickets	–
Bowling average	–
5 wickets in innings	–
10 wickets in match	–
Best bowling	–
Catches/stumpings	2/–
- Source: Cricinfo, 8 January 2010

Henry J.B. Meaden (born in 1862 in Point de Galle, Ceylon; date of death unknown) was an English first-class cricketer.

Meaden represented Hampshire in three first-class match in 1881, making his debut against Sussex. Meaden represented the county in two more games, against Sussex again and lastly the Marylebone Cricket Club.
