= List of people from Hampshire =

This is a list of famous or notable people from were either born or resided in the English county of Hampshire:

== A ==
- Edward Abraham, biochemist, was born in Shirley
- James Acton, cricketer, was born in Southampton
- Fanny Adams, murder victim, was born in Alton
- James Adams, cricketer, was born in Winchester
- Rick Adams, broadcaster, was born in Winchester
- Adamski, Adam Tinley, music producer, was born in Lymington
- William Adelin, prince, was born in Winchester
- Æthelwold of Winchester, bishop, was born in Winchester
- Ben Ainslie, yachtsman, was raised in Lymington
- Ben Mansfield, actor, born in Romsey
- Holly Aird, actor, was born in Aldershot
- Bill Albury, footballer, was born in Portsmouth
- Richard Aldington, poet, was born in Portsmouth
- Michael Alexander, diplomat, was born in Winchester
- Alfie Allen, actor, was born in Portsmouth
- Anthony Allen, rugby union player, was born in Southampton
- Christopher Allen, cricketer, was born in Southampton
- Mabel Alleyne, wood engraver, was born in Southampton
- James Alms, naval commander, was born in Gosport
- Richard Altham, cricketer, was born in Winchester
- Charles Ambler, footballer, was born in Alverstoke
- Charlie Amesbury, rugby union player, was born in Portsmouth
- Linda Amos, swimmer, was born in Portsmouth
- Bob Anderson, darts player, was born in Winchester
- Bob Anderson, fencer, was born in Gosport
- Diana Anderson, midwife, was born in Portsmouth
- Darren Anderton, footballer, was born in Southampton
- Cecil Andrews, footballer, was born in Alton
- Percy Andrews, footballer, was born in Alton
- Richard Andrews, industrialist, was born in Bishops Sutton
- Manny Andruszewski, footballer, was born in Eastleigh
- John Antrobus, playwright, was born in Aldershot
- Kirsty Applebaum, children's author
- Aqualung, singer, was born in Southampton
- Alexander Dundas Young Arbuthnott, naval commander, was born in Forton
- Geoffrey Arbuthnot, naval commander, was born in Havant
- Edward Archdale, sailor, was born in Portsmouth
- Les Archer, motorcycle racer, was born in Aldershot
- John Arlott, sports commentator, was born in Basingstoke
- Maxwell Armfield, painter, was born in Ringwood
- Richard Arthur, politician, was born in Aldershot
- Arthur Atherley, politician, was born in Southampton
- Sam Attwater, actor, was born in Basingstoke
- Juliet Aubrey, actor, was born in Fleet
- Claude Auchinleck, army commander, was born in Aldershot
- Cassandra Austen, painter, was born in Steventon
- Charles Austen, naval commander, was born in Steventon
- Francis Austen, naval commander, was born in Steventon
- Jane Austen, novelist, was born in Steventon
- Danny Axford, cyclist, was born in Winchester
- Wilbert Awdry, novelist, was born in Ampfield
- John Ayliffe, jurist, was born in Pember
- Jon Ayling, cricketer, was born in Portsmouth
- Hertha Marks Ayrton, engineer, was born in Portsea, Portsmouth

== B ==
- James Bailey, politician, was born in Ropley
- Jim Bailey, cricketer, was born in Otterbourne
- Donald Baker, bishop, was born in Portsmouth
- Graham Baker, footballer, was born in Southampton
- Rae Baker, footballer, was born in Southampton
- Richard St. Barbe Baker, Founder of the International Tree Foundation, born in West End
- Tom Baker, clergyman, was born in Southampton
- William Morrant Baker, physician, was born in Andover
- Clare Balding, presenter, was born in Kingsclere
- William Baldock, cricketer, was born in Chilworth
- Herbert Baldwin, cricketer, was born in Hartley Wintney
- Peter Baldwin, politician, was born in Aldershot
- Nicky Banger, footballer, was born in Southampton
- David Banks, cricketer, was born in Southampton
- Carl Barât, guitarist, was born in Basingstoke
- George Barfoot, cricketer, was born in Twyford
- Stuart Barfoot, footballer, was born in Southampton
- Peter Barlow, footballer, was born in Portsmouth
- Joseph Osmond Barnard, engraver, was born in Portsmouth
- Mike Barnard, cricketer and footballer, was born in Portsmouth
- James Barnes, television director, was born in Portsmouth
- Nora Stanton Blatch Barney, civil engineer, was born in Basingstoke
- Peter Barrett, cricketer, was born in Winchester
- Laurence D. Barron, chemist, was born in Southampton
- Edward Dodsley Barrow, politician, was born in Ringwood
- Martin Barry, physician, was born in Fratton
- Kevin Bartlett, footballer, was born in Portsmouth
- Emma Barton, actor, was born in Portsmouth
- Charles Barton, cricketer, was born in Sherfield English
- Victor Barton, cricketer, was born in Hound
- Steve Basham, footballer, was born in Southampton
- Geeta Basra, actor, was born in Portsmouth
- Justin Bates, cricketer, was born in Farnborough
- Elizabeth Bather, police officer, was born in Winchester
- Mike Batt, music producer, was born in Southampton
- Tim Battersby, composer, was born in Fleet
- Henry Beagley, cricketer, was born in Alton
- John Beagley, cricketer, was born in Alton
- Daniel Marcus William Beak, naval commander, was born in Southampton
- George Beare, footballer, was born in Shirley Warren
- Don Beauman, racing driver, was born in Farnborough
- Julia Beckett, swimmer, was born in Winchester
- Tony Beckley, actor, was born in Southampton
- George Bell, theologian, was born in Hayling Island
- Kelly Bell, model, was born in Aldershot
- John Belling, geneticist, was born in Aldershot
- Francis Benali, footballer, was born in Southampton
- Russell Bencraft, cricketer, was born in Southampton
- Paul Bennett, footballer, was born in Southampton
- Peter B. Bennett, anaesthesiologist, was born in Portsmouth
- Godfrey Benson, politician, was born in New Alresford
- Graham Benstead, footballer, was born in Aldershot
- Bernhard Bentinck, cricketer, was born in South Warnborough
- Eugene Bernard, footballer, was born in Southampton
- Amelle Berrabah, singer, was born in Aldershot
- Cyril Berry, winemaker, was raised in Andover
- Johnny Berry, footballer, was born in Aldershot
- Walter Besant, novelist, was born in Portsmouth
- Scott Bevan, footballer, was born in Southampton
- Billy Bevis, footballer, was born in Warsash
- Bevis of Hampton, legendary hero, was born in Southampton
- Alexander William Bickerton, physicist, was born in Alton
- George Biddlecombe, naval surveyor, was born in Portsea, Portsmouth
- Thomas Bilson, bishop, was born in Winchester
- Henry Bird, chess player, was born in Portsea, Portsmouth
- Birdy, singer, was born in Lymington
- Denise Black, actor, was born in Emsworth
- Roger Black, athlete, was born in Gosport
- Kenneth Blackburne, colonial governor, was born in Bordon
- Ronnie Blackman, footballer, was born in Portsmouth
- David Blake, cricketer, was born in Havant
- John Blake, cricketer, was born in Portsmouth
- Thomas Blakiston, naturalist, was born in Lymington
- Helena Blackman, actor, was born in Southampton
- Frederick Blundell, cricketer, was born in South Stoneham
- Gary Bond, actor, was born in Alton
- Ronnie Bond, drummer, was born in Andover
- John Bonham-Carter, politician, was born in Portsmouth
- Lothian Bonham-Carter, cricketer, was born in Adhurst St Mary
- Emma Bonney, billiards player, was born in Portsmouth
- Cecil Bouchier, pilot, was born in Fleet
- Lionel Bowen, footballer, was born in Southampton
- Marjorie Bowen, novelist, was born in Hayling Island
- Judi Bowker, actor, was born in Shawford
- John Boxall, clergyman, was born in Bramshott
- Ken Boyes, footballer, was born in Southampton
- Stuart Boyes, cricketer, was born in Southampton
- A.V. Bramble, actor, was born in Portsmouth
- Thomas Bramsdon, politician, was born in Portsea, Portsmouth
- John Bray, communications engineer, was born in Fratton
- Noel Brett, cricketer, was born in Aldershot
- Frederick Lee Bridell, painter, was born in Southampton
- Wayne Bridge, footballer, was born in Southampton
- Henry Bromfield, politician, was born in South Stoneham
- William Arnold Bromfield, botanist, was born in Boldre
- Robert Brooke, colonial governor, was born in Southampton
- Jeremy Brooks, novelist, was born in Southampton
- Joe Brooks, singer, was born in Southampton
- Arthur Brough, actor, was born in Petersfield
- Bob Brown, footballer, was born in Southampton
- Jason "J" Brown, singer, was born in Aldershot
- John Brown, cricketer, was born in Warblington
- Kevan Brown, footballer, was born in Andover
- Laurie Brown, bishop, was born in Basingstoke
- Peter Brown, footballer, was born in Andover
- Wayne Brown, footballer, was born in Southampton
- Tom Browne, broadcaster, was born in Lymington
- Donovan Browning, footballer, was born in Ashley
- Isambard Kingdom Brunel, engineer, was born in Portsea, Portsmouth
- Iain Brunnschweiler, cricketer, was born in Southampton
- Charles Brutton, cricketer, was born in Southsea
- Nick Buchanan, cricketer, was born in Basingstoke
- Bill Buck, cricketer, was born in Portswood
- Hugh Buckler, actor, was born in Southampton
- Charles Budden, cricketer, was born in Fareham
- James Budden, cricketer, was born in Bevois Town
- John Bulbeck, cricketer, was born in Havant
- Mervyn Burden, cricketer, was born in Southampton
- Thomas Burgess, bishop, was born in Odiham
- Geoffrey Burgon, composer, was born in Hambledon
- Frank Burnell-Nugent, cricketer, was born in Sherborne St John
- Andy Burrows, drummer, was born in Winchester
- Tom Burrows, footballer, was born in Portsmouth
- Alan Burton, footballer, was born in Aldershot
- Charles Butler, novelist, was born in Romsey
- George Edmund Butler, painter, was born in Southampton
- Martin Butler, composer, was born in Romsey
- Thomas Adair Butler, soldier, was born in Soberton
- Len Butt, footballer, was born in Freemantle
- John Button, politician, was born in Buckland
- John Button, politician, was born in Buckland
- James Bye, actor, was born in Basingstoke
- Arthur Byng, cricketer, was born in Southsea

== C ==
- David Calder, actor, was born in Portsmouth
- Henry Calder, cricketer, was born in South Stoneham
- Olli Caldwell, racing driver.
- James Callaghan, politician, was born in Copnor
- Isabella Calthorpe, actor, was born in Winchester
- Douglas Cameron, pilot, was born in Southampton
- Alastair Campbell, cricketer, was born in South Stoneham
- Alec Campbell, footballer, was born in Southampton
- John Candy, pilot, was born in Froyle
- Victor Cannings, cricketer, was born in Bighton
- Mornington Cannon, jockey, was born in Houghton
- Noel Capon, academic, was born in Southampton
- Matt Cardle, singer, was born in Southampton
- Arthur Carlisle, bishop, was born in Portsmouth
- Laura Carmichael, actor, was born in Southampton
- Harry Carpenter, bishop, was born in Liss
- George Carter, cricketer, was born in Warblington
- James Carter, judge, was born in Portsmouth
- Stuart Bonham Carter, naval officer, was born in Portsmouth
- Donald Cartridge, cricketer, was born in Sholing
- Richard Carty, cricketer, was born in Southampton
- George Case, cricketer, was born in Fareham
- Louise Casey, government adviser, was born in Portsmouth
- Raquel Cassidy, actor, was born in Fleet
- Sid Castle, footballer, was born in Basingstoke
- Vito Cataffo, restaurateur, was raised in Southampton
- Bob Catley, singer, was born in Aldershot
- Ethel Caterham, supercentenarian, was born in Shipton Bellinger
- Stuart Catterall, cricketer, was born in Southampton
- Ronald Cavaye, pianist, was born in Aldershot
- Kathryn Cave, novelist, was born in Aldershot
- Christopher Cazenove, actor, was born in Winchester
- Maureen Chadwick, screenwriter and dramatist, was born in Aldershot
- Garry Chalk, actor, was born in Southampton
- Norman Chalk, footballer, was born in Bitterne
- Basil Hall Chamberlain, linguist, was born in Southsea
- Houston Stewart Chamberlain, philosopher, was born in Southsea
- Will Champion, drummer, was born in Southampton
- Arthur Bertram Chandler, novelist, was born in Aldershot
- Richard Chandler, antiquary, was born in Elson
- John Worthy Chaplin, soldier, was born in Ramsdell
- Bill Charlton, footballer, was born in South Stoneham
- Ernle Chatfield, naval commander, was born in Southsea
- Mary Cheke, lady of the privy chamber, courtier poet, epigrammatist, was born in Hampshire
- Kara Chesworth, cyclist, was born in Portsmouth
- David Chidgey, politician, was born in Basingstoke
- Thomas Chignell, cricketer, was born in Havant
- Robert L. Chidlaw-Roberts, pilot, was born in Winchester
- Chris Chittell, actor, was born in Aldershot
- Ian Chivers, cricketer, was born in Southampton
- Martin Chivers, footballer, was born in Southampton
- Chris T-T, singer, was born in Winchester
- Cecil Christmas, footballer, was born in Southampton
- Charles Chubb, locksmith, was born in Fordingbridge
- Alexa Chung, model, was born in Privett
- Hedley Churchward, painter, was born in Aldershot
- Steve Claridge, football manager, was born in Portsmouth
- Clive Clark, golfer, was born in Winchester
- Andrew Clarke, colonial governor, was born in Southsea
- Alasdair Clayre, singer, was born in Southampton
- Montagu Cleeve, music teacher, was born in Southsea
- William Clement, cricketer
- Stan Clements, footballer, was born in Portsmouth
- Tom Cleverley, footballer, was born in Basingstoke
- Basil Coad, general, was born in Portsmouth
- Charles Cobbe, archbishop, was born in Swarraton
- Denise Coffey, actor, was born in Aldershot
- Peter Coke, actor, was born in Southsea
- John Colborne, colonial governor, was born in Lyndhurst
- Bill Coldwell, football manager, was born in Petersfield
- Marilyn Cole, model, was born in Portsmouth
- Norman Cole, footballer, was born in Southampton
- Andrew Collins, cricketer, was born in Andover
- Darren Collins, footballer, was born in Winchester
- Richard Collins, painter, was born in Gosport
- Alan Comfort, footballer, was born in Aldershot
- Hugh Constantine, air force commander, was born in Southsea
- Andy Cook, footballer, was born in Romsey
- Pam Cook, film historian, was born in Farnborough
- George Costigan, actor, was born in Portsmouth
- Alexander Cowie, cricketer, was born in Lymington
- Darren Cowley, cricketer, was born in Winchester
- William Cowper, anatomist, was born in Petersfield
- Walter Cox, footballer, was born in Southampton
- William Denton Cox, steward, was born in Southampton
- Lol Coxhill, saxophonist, was born in Portsmouth
- Ray Crawford, footballer, was born in Portsmouth
- Stan Cribb, footballer, was born in Gosport
- Thomas Crimble, cricketer, was born in Overton
- N. J. Crisp, dramatist, was born in Southampton
- Tom Croft, rugby union player, was born in Basingstoke
- Edmund Crofts, cricketer, was born in Winchester
- Alex Cropley, footballer, was born in Aldershot
- Ian Crosby, cricketer, was born in Aldershot
- Matt Crossley, footballer, was born in Basingstoke
- Noel Croucher, businessman and philanthropist
- Philip Crowley, entomologist, was born in Alton
- Jon Cruddas, politician, was raised in Waterlooville
- George Cull, cricketer, was born in Lymington
- Barry Cunliffe, archaeologist, was raised in Portsmouth
- Bessie Cursons, actor, was born in Portsmouth
- Henry Curtis, sailor, was born in Romsey
- William Curtis, botanist, was born in Alton

== D ==
- Ranulph Dacre, merchant, was born in Owslebury
- Liam Daish, footballer, was born in Portsmouth
- Richard Dalton, cricketer, was born in Portsmouth
- Guy Daly, cricketer, was born in Bramley
- Sid Daniels, mariner, was born in Portsmouth
- Alex Danson, field hockey player, was born in Southampton
- James Darby, cricketer, was born in Fareham
- Ian Darke, sports commentator, was born in Portsmouth
- Julia Darling, novelist, was born in Winchester
- George Darvill, pilot, was born in Petersfield
- Craig David, singer, was born in Southampton
- Arthur Lumley Davids, orientalist, born in Hampshire
- Harold Davidson, clergyman, was born in Hound
- Emily Davies, suffragist, was born in Southampton
- Libby Davies, politician, was born in Aldershot
- Samantha Davies, yachtswoman, was born in Portsmouth
- Walter Davis, botanist, was born in Amport
- Richard Dawson, actor, was born in Gosport
- George Fiott Day, sailor, was born in Southampton
- Adam de Gurdon, knight, was born in Alton
- Geoffrey de Havilland, test pilot, was born in Kingsclere
- Robbe De Hert, film director, was born in Farnborough
- William de Meones, judge, was born in East Meon
- Thomas Dean, cricketer, was born in Gosport
- George Deane, cricketer, was born in Bighton
- Nick Dear, playwright, was born in Portsmouth
- Alfred Denning, judge, was born in Whitchurch
- Harry Dennis, footballer, was born in Romsey
- Charles Dibdin, songwriter, was born in Southampton
- William Dible, cricketer, was born in Southampton
- Charles Dickens, novelist, was born in Landport
- Jimmy Dickinson, footballer, was born in Alton
- Edward Didymus, footballer, was born in Portsmouth
- Kirsty Dillon, actor, was born in Portsmouth
- Charlie Dimmock, gardener, was born in Southampton
- Thomas Dingley, antiquary, was born in Southampton
- William Dodd, cricketer, was born in Steep
- Sean Doherty, footballer, was born in Basingstoke
- Arthur Dominy, footballer, was born in South Stoneham
- Daisy Dormer, singer, was born in Portsmouth
- Aman Dosanj, footballer, was born in Southampton
- Sarah Doucette, politician, was born in Winchester
- Howard Douglas, general, was born in Gosport
- Peter John Douglas, naval commander, was born in Portsmouth
- Harry Downer, cricketer, was born in Southampton
- Ted Drake, footballer, was born in Southampton
- Paul Draper, cricketer, was born in Southampton
- Frederick Drew, geologist, was born in Southampton
- Samuel Rolles Driver, theologian, was born in Southampton
- Henry Drummond, religious leader, was born in Northington
- Nicola Duffett, actor, was born in Portsmouth
- John Duigan, film director, was born in Hartley Wintney
- Edmund Dummer, shipbuilder, was born in North Stoneham
- Richard Dummer, colonist, was born in Bishopstoke
- Arthur Duncan, cricketer, was born in Southampton
- Dunbar Duncan, cricketer, was born in Southampton
- Bill Newton Dunn, politician, was born in Greywell
- Eric Dunn, air marshall, was born in Winchester
- John Freeman Dunn, politician, was born in Basingstoke
- John Charles Durant, politician, was born in Fordingbridge
- Ralph Dutton, gardener, was born in Hinton Ampner
- Bert Dyer, footballer, was born in Portsmouth

== E ==
- Pat Earles, footballer, was born in Titchfield
- Michael East, athlete, was born in Portsmouth
- David Easter, actor, was born in Eastleigh
- Mark Easton, journalist, was raised in Winchester
- John Ecton, tithe collector, was born in Winchester
- Ernie Edds, footballer, was born in Portsmouth
- Edward Lee Ede, cricketer, was born in Itchen
- Edward Murray Charles Ede, cricketer, was born in Southampton
- George Ede, cricketer, was born in Itchen
- Kate Edmondson, broadcaster, was born in Portsmouth
- Matt Edmondson, broadcaster, was born in Portsmouth
- Spike Edney, keyboard player, was born in Portsmouth
- Emma Edwards, politician, was born in Portsmouth
- Bill Ellerington, footballer, was born in Southampton
- Edward Elliot-Square, cricketer, was born in Winchester
- Albert Elliott, rugby union player, was born in Southampton
- Wade Elliott, footballer, was born in Eastleigh
- Christopher Elrington, historian, was born in Farnborough
- Charles Isaac Elton, barrister, was born in Southampton
- Gareth Emery, music producer, was born in Southampton
- Arthur English, actor, was born in Aldershot
- Edward Evans, theologian, was born in West Meon
- Ralph Evans, cricketer, was born in Newtown
- Eamon Everall, painter, was born in Aldershot
- John Ewbank, songwriter, was born in Eastleigh

== F ==
- Bob Fairman, footballer, was born in Southampton
- Brett Fancy, actor, was born in Portsmouth
- Harry Warner Farnall, politician, was born in Burley
- Richard Faulds, sport shooter, was raised in Longparish
- John Favour, theologian, was born in Southampton
- Sam Fay, railwayman, was born in Hamble le Rice
- John Feaver, tennis player, was born in Fleet
- J. W. C. Fegan, altruist, was born in Southampton
- Edward Stephen Fogarty Fegen, naval commander, was born in Southsea
- Walter Feltham, cricketer, was born in Ringwood
- Ronald Ferguson, polo player, was raised in Dummer
- Albert Fielder, cricketer, was born in Sarisbury Green
- Colin Fielder, footballer, was born in Winchester
- Walter Fielder, cricketer, was born in Fareham
- George Rudolf Hanbury Fielding, soldier, was born in Twyford
- Susannah Fielding, actor, was raised in Havant
- Anne Finch, poet, was born in Sydmonton
- Colin Firth, actor, was born in Grayshott
- Frances Fisher, actor, was born in Milford on Sea
- Rosa Frederica Baring FitzGeorge, socialite, was born in West Tytherley
- Desmond Fitzpatrick, general, was born in Aldershot
- Henry Fitzroy, cricketer, was born in Southampton
- Ray Flacke, guitarist, was born in Milford on Sea
- Aaron Flahavan, footballer, was born in Southampton
- Darryl Flahavan, footballer, was born in Southampton
- Thomas Fletcher, poet, was born in Avington
- Walter Flight, mineralogist, was born in Winchester
- Darren Flint, cricketer, was born in Basingstoke
- Gerald Flood, actor, was born in Portsmouth
- Raymond Flood, cricketer, was born in Northam
- James Foad, rower, was born in Southampton
- Henry Foot, cricketer, was born in Romsey
- Mark Foran, footballer, was born in Aldershot
- Charles John Forbes, politician, was born in Gosport
- Julia Fordham, singer, was born in Portsmouth
- Darren Foreman, footballer, was born in Southampton
- Philippa Forrester, broadcaster, was born in Winchester
- Harold Forster, cricketer, was born in Winchester
- Charles Forward, cricketer, was born in Romsey
- Francis Foster, cricketer, was born in Havant
- Steve Foster, footballer, was born in Portsmouth
- Thomas Fox, cricketer, was born in Broughton
- William Tilbury Fox, dermatologist, was born in Broughton
- Mike Foyle, music producer, was born in Southampton
- Harold Frank, painter, was born in Southampton
- Martin Freeman, actor, was born in Aldershot
- Brian Freemantle, novelist, was born in Southampton
- Frederick Freemantle, cricketer, was born in Binley
- Joe French, footballer, was born in Southampton
- Henry Frere, cricketer, was born in Odiham
- Brian Froud, illustrator, was born in Winchester
- Stephen Fry, cricketer, was born in Portsmouth
- Charles Fryatt, mariner, was born in Southampton
- Jim Fryatt, footballer, was born in Southampton

== G ==
- David Gaiman, public relations officer, was born in Portsmouth
- Neil Gaiman, novelist, was born in Portchester
- Henry Gale, cricketer, was born in Winchester
- Phil Gallie, politician, was born in Portsmouth
- John Galpin, cricketer, was born in Alverstoke
- Ted Galpin, businessman, was born in Portsmouth
- Russell Garcia, field hockey player, was born in Portsmouth
- Thomas Garnier, clergyman, was born in Bishopstoke
- George Garrett, composer, was born in Winch
- Joseph Garrett, YouTuber, stampylonghead, lives in Hampshire
- Stephen Gaselee, judge, was born in Portsmouth
- Chris Geere, actor, was raised in Winchester
- Pam Gems, playwright, was born in Bransgore
- Helen Ghosh, civil servant, was born in Farnborough
- Richard Gibbons, religious scholar, was born in Winchester
- Edgar Gibson, bishop, was born in Fawley
- William Gilbert, novelist, was born in Bishopstoke
- Michael Giles, drummer, was born in Waterlooville
- Peter Giles, bass guitarist, was born in Havant
- John Gilpin, ballet dancer, was born in Southsea
- Malcolm Gladwell, journalist, was born in Fareham
- Murray Gold, composer, was born in Portsmouth
- Alison Goldfrapp, singer, was raised in Alton
- Ernest Spiteri Gonzi, footballer, was born in Aldershot
- Josh Goodall, tennis player, was born in Basingstoke
- Jim Goodchild, footballer, was born in Southampton
- John Goodyer, botanist, was born in Alton
- Johnny Gordon, footballer, was born in Portsmouth
- Arthur Gore, tennis player, was born in Lyndhurst
- Robert Vaughan Gorle, soldier, was born in Southsea
- David Gorman, cricketer, was born in Havant
- James Gornall, cricketer, was born in Farnborough
- Andy Gosney, footballer, was born in Southampton
- John Goss, composer, was born in Fareham
- John Gother, priest, was born in Southampton
- Stephen Gough, public nudity activist, was born in Eastleigh
- Rupert Gould, horologist, was born in Southsea
- Claude Grahame-White, aviator, was born in Bursledon
- Thomas Tassell Grant, inventor, was born in Portsea, Portsmouth
- Richard Granville, cricketer, was born in Kings Worthy
- Andy Gray, footballer, was born in Southampton
- Paul Gray, footballer, was born in Portsmouth
- Simon Gray, playwright, was born in Hayling Island
- Nicholas Greaves, clergyman, was born in Colemore
- Chris Green, railwayman, was born in Winchester
- Frederick Green, novelist, was born in Portsmouth
- Judd Green, actor, was born in Portsmouth
- Malcolm Green, chemist, was born in Eastleigh
- George Greenfield, cricketer, was born in Winchester
- Herbert Greenfield, politician, was born in Winchester
- Carl Greenidge, cricketer, was born in Basingstoke
- David Greetham, cricketer, was born in Liss
- Jack Gregory, footballer, was born in Southampton
- Maundy Gregory, political fixer, was born in Southampton
- John Griffin, rugby union player, was born in Southampton
- Phil Griggs, footballer, was born in Southampton
- Frederick Gross, cricketer, was born in South Stoneham
- Harriet Grote, biographer, was born in Southampton
- Anthony Norris Groves, missionary, was born in Newton Valence
- David Guard, cricketer, was born in Romsey
- Chris Gubbey, businessman, was born in Gosport
- Charles Gunner, cricketer, was born in Bishop's Waltham
- John Gunner, cricketer, was born in Bishop's Waltham
- Neil Gunter, cricketer, was born in Basingstoke
- Steve Guppy, footballer, was born in Winchester
- John Gurdon, biologist, was born in Dippenhall
- Bernard Gutteridge, poet, was born in Southampton
- May Gutteridge, social worker, was born in Gosport

== H ==
- David Habbin, opera singer, was born in Ringwood
- James Hackman, murderer, was born in Gosport
- Kevin Hague, politician, was born in Aldershot
- David Haig, actor, was born in Aldershot
- Clifford Hall, cricketer, was born in Breamore
- Patrick Hall, cricketer, was born in Portsmouth
- Robert Hall, cricketer, was born in Andover
- Lewis Stratford Tollemache Halliday, soldier, was born in Medstead
- John Halsted, naval commander, was born in Gosport
- Lawrence Halsted, naval commander, was born in Gosport
- Charles Powell Hamilton, naval commander, was born in Droxford
- Mark Hamilton, guitarist, was raised in Alton
- Stephen Hammond, politician, was born in Southampton
- Mike Hancock, politician, was born in Portsmouth
- Peter Hancock, bishop, was raised in Fareham
- Jonathan Handley, naval commander, was born in Southsea
- Terry Hands, theatre director, was born in Aldershot
- St John Emile Clavering Hankin, playwright, was born in Southampton
- John Hanlon, athlete, was born in Portsmouth
- Antony Hansen, singer, was born in Southampton
- Jonas Hanway, merchant, was born in Portsmouth
- Francis Pym Harding, colonial governor, was born in Lymington
- Israel Harding, sailor, was born in Portsmouth
- William Harding, photographer, was born in Southampton
- Charles Hardy, naval commander, was born in Portsmouth
- Jeremy Hardy, comedian, was born in Aldershot
- Lewis Harfield, cricketer, was born in Cheriton
- Jane Harley, socialite, was born in Itchen Stoke
- Toby Harnden, journalist, was born in Portsmouth
- Frederick Harold, cricketer, was born in Eling
- Pamela Harriman, diplomat, was born in Farnborough
- Ashley Harris, footballer, was born in Purbrook
- Benjamin Randell Harris, soldier, was born in Portsea, Portsmouth
- Charles Harris, basketball player, was born in Southampton
- Jack Harris, film editor, was born in South Farnborough
- Keith Harris, ventriloquist, was born in Lyndhurst
- Peter Harris, footballer, was born in Portsmouth
- Steve Harris, novelist, was born in Basingstoke
- Fred Harrison, footballer, was born in Winchester
- William Henry Harrison, cricketer, was born in Nursling
- Miranda Hart, actor, was raised in Petersfield
- Donna Hartley-Wass, athlete, was born in Southampton
- Henry Robinson Hartley, philanthropist, was born in Southampton
- Mark Hartmann, footballer, was born in Southampton
- Matthew Hartmann, footballer, was born in Southampton
- Bill Harvey, footballer, was born in Shirley
- Frank Harvey, cricketer, was born in Southampton
- Nick Harvey, politician, was born in Chandler's Ford
- Nikki Harvey, ten-pin bowler, was born in Southampton
- Richard Harwood, cellist, was born in Portsmouth
- Anthony Haswell, printer, was born in Portsmouth
- Owen Hatherley, journalist, was born in Southampton
- Lanoe Hawker, pilot, was born in Longparish
- Paddy Haycocks, broadcaster, was born in Portsmouth
- Brian Hayles, screenwriter, was born in Portsmouth
- Rob Hayles, cyclist, was born in Portsmouth
- Montague Hayter, cricketer, was born in Ringwood
- Edwin Hazelton, cricketer, was born in Southampton
- Allan Heath, cricketer, was born in East Woodhay
- Mark Evelyn Heath, diplomat, was born in Emsworth
- George Handel Heath-Gracie, organist, was born in Gosport
- Trevor Hebberd, footballer, was born in Winchester
- Nadia Hebson, painter, was born in Romsey
- Heinz, singer, was raised in Eastleigh
- Edward Hemsted, cricketer, was born in Whitchurch
- Doug Henderson, footballer, was born in Southampton
- David Heneker, composer, was born in Southsea
- Janet Henfrey, actor, was born in Aldershot
- Henry III of England, monarch, was born in Winchester
- Bob Herman, cricketer, was born in Southampton
- James Hibberd, cricketer, was born in Southampton
- George Elgar Hicks, painter, was born in Lymington
- George Hicks, trade unionist, was born in Vernhams Dean
- Anthony Hill, cricketer, was born in Romsey Extra
- Benny Hill, comedian, was born in Southampton
- Derek Hill, painter, was born in Southampton
- Georgiana Hill, cookery book writer, lived in Tadley
- Gerry Hill, cricketer, was born in Totton
- Harold Hillier, horticulturist, was born in Winchester
- James Hillyar, naval commander, was born in Portsea, Portsmouth
- Harold Hinde, cricketer, was born in Southsea
- Richard Hindley, cricketer, was born in Portsmouth
- John Hinton, footballer, was born in Southampton
- Christopher Hitchens, journalist, was born in Portsmouth
- Ernest Hoare, cricketer, was born in Upper Clatford
- Joe Hoare, footballer, was born in Southampton
- Philip Hoare, author, was born in Southampton
- Carleton Hobbs, actor, was born in Farnborough
- Jack Hobbs, footballer, was born in Portsmouth
- John Raymond Hobbs, pathologist, was born in Aldershot
- Charles Howard Hodges, painter, was born in Portsmouth
- Roger Hodgson, singer, was born in Portsmouth
- Lancelot Hogben, zoologist, was born in Portsmouth
- Norman Douglas Holbrook, submariner, was born in Southsea
- John Hold, footballer, was born in Southampton
- Amanda Holden, actor, was born in Bishop's Waltham
- Cedric Holland, naval commander, was born in Alverstoke
- Henry Holland, cricketer, was born in Hartley Row
- Maggie Holland, singer, was born in Alton
- Ralph Hollins, naturalist, was born in Martin
- Henry Holmes, cricketer, was born in Romsey
- Nick Holmes, footballer, was born in Southampton
- Arthur Holt, footballer, was born in Bitterne Park
- Geoff Holt, yachtsman, was born in Portsmouth
- Ernest George Horlock, soldier, was born in Alton
- Bert Hoskins, football manager, was born in Southampton
- Jon Hotten, author, was born in Aldershot
- Brian Howard, footballer, was born in Winchester
- Peter Howard, physician, was born in Aldershot
- Brian Howe, singer, was born in Portsmouth
- Kate Howey, judoka, was born in Andover
- Mike Hugg, drummer, was born in Gosport
- David Hughes, novelist, was born in Alton
- Phil Hughes, cricketer, was born in Southampton
- Walter Humphreys, cricketer, was born in Southsea
- Dennis Hunt, footballer, was born in Portsmouth
- Douglas Hunt, footballer, was born in Shipton Bellinger
- Ralph Hunt, footballer, was born in Portsmouth
- Stephen Hunt, footballer, was born in Southampton
- Warren Hunt, footballer, was born in Portsmouth
- Elizabeth Hurley, actress, model was born in Basingstoke
- Hector Hurst, racing driver, was born in Lymington
- Chris Hutchings, football manager, was born in Winchester
- Steve Hutchings, footballer, was born in Portsmouth
- Arthur Hutchins, footballer, was born in Bishop's Waltham
- Peter Orlando Hutchinson, artist, was born in Winchester
- Sam Hutsby, golfer, was born in Portsmouth
- George Hyde, naval commander, was born in Southsea
- Hector Hyslop, cricketer, was born in Southampton

== I ==
- Nelson Illingworth, sculptor, was born in Portsmouth
- Danny Ings, footballer, was born in Winchester
- Simon Ings, novelist, was born in Horndean
- Robert Irving, conductor, was born in Winchester
- Gwyther Irwin, abstract artist, was born in Basingstoke
- Lionel Isherwood, cricketer, was born in Portsmouth

== J ==
- Frederick Jackman, cricketer, was born in Fareham
- Alison Jackson, photographer, was born in Southsea
- Charlotte Jackson, journalist, was born in Portsmouth
- Joan Jackson, muse, was born in Farnborough
- Joe Jackson, singer, was raised in Paulsgrove
- Richard Downes Jackson, colonial administrator, was born in Petersfield
- Edgar Jacob, bishop, was born in Crawley
- Giles Jacob, literary critic, was born in Romsey
- John James, architect, was raised in Basingstoke
- Manley Angell James, soldier, was born in Odiham
- Raji James, actor, was born in Portsmouth
- William Milbourne James, naval commander, was born in Hartley Wintney
- Robert Sympson Jameson, politician, was born in Harbridge
- Waldemar Januszczak, art critic, was born in Basingstoke
- Frank Jefferis, footballer, was born in Fordingbridge
- Joanna Jeffrees, actor, was born in Winchester
- Henry Jelf, cricketer, was born in Aldershot
- Frederick Jellicoe, cricketer, was born in Southampton
- John Jellicoe, naval commander, was born in Southampton
- Albert Jenkin, rugby union player, was born in Ibsley
- Frank Jenner, evangelist, was born in Southampton
- Sam Jepp, footballer, was born in Aldershot
- Selwyn Jepson, novelist, was born in Farther Common
- Belita Jepson-Turner, figure skater, was born in Nether Wallop
- Robert Jesson, cricketer, was born in Southampton
- Trevor Jesty, cricketer, was born in Gosport
- Guy Jewell, cricketer, was born in Axford
- Robin Johns, cricketer, was born in Southampton
- Alexander Bryan Johnson, philosopher, was born in Gosport
- Neil Johnson, film director, was born in Southampton
- Claire Johnstone, footballer, was born in Portsmouth
- Christian Jolley, footballer, was born in Fleet
- Allen Jones, sculptor, was born in Southampton
- Howard Jones, singer, was born in Southampton
- Loftus William Jones, naval commander, was born in Petersfield
- Mick Jones, guitarist, was born in Portsmouth
- Paul Jones, singer, was born in Portsmouth
- Frank Jordan, footballer, was born in Southampton
- John Wesley Judd, geologist, was born in Portsmouth
- William Judd, cricketer, was born in Bramshaw
- Lukas Jutkiewicz, footballer, was born in Southampton

== K ==
- Herminie Templeton Kavanagh, novelist, was born in Aldershot
- Henry Kay, cricketer, was born in Bedhampton
- Robbie Kay, actor, was born in Lymington
- Dillie Keane, actor, was born in Portsmouth
- Jessie Keane, British author, born in Hampshire
- Richard Goodwin Keats, naval commander, was born in Chalton
- Joe Keenan, footballer, was born in Southampton
- Laura Keene, theatre director, was born in Winchester
- Nelson Keene, singer, was born in Farnborough
- Frederick Keeping, cyclist, was born in Pennington
- Michael Keeping, footballer, was born in Milford on Sea
- Martin Kellaway, cricketer, was born in Southampton
- Edward Kelsey, actor, was born in Petersfield
- John Kempe, politician, was born in Beaulieu
- William Kendle, cricketer, was born in Romsey Extra
- Derek Kenway, cricketer, was born in Fareham
- Richard Kenway, cricketer, was born in Southampton
- Paul Kerr, footballer, was born in Portsmouth
- Bob Kiddle, footballer, was born in Southampton
- Cath Kidston, retail designer, was raised near Andover
- Sidney Kimber, politician, was born in Highfield
- Arthur Kimish, cricketer, was born in Southampton
- Danielle King, cyclist, was born in Southampton
- Ernie King, footballer, was born in Southampton
- James King, cricketer, was born in Southampton
- Clarence Kingsbury, cyclist, was born in Portsmouth
- John Kingsmill, politician, was born in King's Enham
- Frederick Kitchener, cricketer, was born in Hartley Row
- Matthew Kleinveldt, cricketer, was born in Southampton
- Philip Klitz, composer, was born in Lymington
- Charles Knott, cricketer, was born in Southampton
- Roy Koerner, explorer, was born in Copnor
- Nicole Koolen, field hockey player, was born in Aldershot

== L ==
- Arthur Lake, bishop, was born in Southampton
- Kirsopp Lake, theologian, was born in Southampton
- Thomas Lake, politician, was born in Southampton
- Bruce Lamb, cricketer, was born in Andover
- Christopher Lambert, politician, was born in Winchester
- Martin Lambert, footballer, was born in Southampton
- Oliver Lambert, politician, was born in Southampton
- Thomas Lambert, politician, was born in Hazeley
- Thomas Lambert, politician, was born in Winchester
- Amanda Lamb, broadcaster, was born in Portsmouth
- Olly Lancashire, footballer, was born in Basingstoke
- James Lancaster, privateer, was born in Basingstoke
- Iain Landles, playwright, was born in Portsmouth
- Mark Lane, cricket coach, was born in Aldershot
- Jason Laney, cricketer, was born in Winchester
- George Langdon, cricketer, was born in Winchester
- William Langford, cricketer, was born in Hythe
- William Lashly, explorer, was born in Hambledon
- James Lawrence, cricketer, was born in Portsmouth
- Patricia Lawrence, actor, was born in Andover
- Alex Lawther, actor, was born in Winchester
- Cliff Lazarenko, darts player, was born in Liss
- Stephen Leacock, humorist, was born in Swanmore
- John Leak, soldier, was born in Portsmouth
- Kenneth Leask, pilot, was born in Southsea
- Charles Leat, cricketer, was born in Ringwood
- Arthur Lee, cricketer, was born in Liphook
- Humphrey de Verd Leigh, inventor, was born in Aldershot
- Chrystabel Leighton-Porter, model, was born in Eastleigh
- Jose Levy, theatre director, was born in Portsmouth
- Jona Lewie, singer, was born in Southampton
- Phil Lewis, cricketer, was born in Liss
- Richard Lewis, cricketer, was born in Winchester
- Dave Leworthy, footballer, was born in Portsmouth
- Henry Liddon, theologian, was born in North Stoneham
- Billy Light, footballer, was born in Woolston
- Elisha Light, cricketer, was born in Winchester
- William Light, cricketer, was born in Winchester
- George Lillycrop, footballer, was born in Gosport
- James Lillywhite, cricketer, was born in Tichborne
- William Lily, grammarian, was born in Odiham
- Kathleen Lindsay, novelist, was born in Aldershot
- Edwin Lineham, cricketer, was born in Landport
- John Lingard, historian, was born in Winchester
- Robert Linzee, naval commander, was born in Portsmouth
- Francis Lipscomb, cricketer, was born in New Alresford
- William Lipscomb, cricketer, was born in Winchester
- Alice Lisle, fugitive shelterer, was born in Ellingham
- John Lloyd, politician, was born in Aldershot
- Martha Lloyd, recipe collector, was born in Bishopstoke
- Nicholas Lloyd, lexicographer, was born in Wonston
- Dan Lobb, broadcaster, was born in Colden Common
- Herbert Lock, footballer, was born in Southampton
- Michael Lockett, soldier, was born in Aldershot
- Kathleen Lockhart, actor, was born in Southsea
- Christopher Logue, poet, was born in Portsmouth
- Henry Long, footballer, was born in Southampton
- Selden Long, pilot, was born in Aldershot
- Okeover Longcroft, cricketer, was born in Havant
- Sue Lopez, footballer, was born in Southampton
- Montagu Love, actor, was born in Portsmouth
- John Lucarotti, screenwriter, was born in Aldershot
- William Lugg, actor, was born in Portsea, Portsmouth
- Frederick Luke, soldier, was born in Lockerley
- David Lunn-Rockliffe, sports administrator, was raised near Winchester
- Algernon Lushington, cricketer, was born in Lyndhurst
- Nicholas Lyndhurst, actor, was born in Emsworth
- Humphrey Lyons, army commander, was born in St Austins
- Richard Lyons, diplomat, was born in Lymington
- Tracy Lyons, paedophile, was born in Portsmouth

== M ==
- Graham Maby, bass guitarist, was born in Gosport
- Angus Macdonald, footballer, was born in Winchester
- Marjorie Oludhe Macgoye, novelist, was born in Southampton
- Alexander Mackonochie, clergyman, was born in Fareham
- Frederic Madden, palaeographer, was born in Portsmouth
- Michelle Magorian, novelist, was born in Portsmouth
- Sam Magri, footballer, was born in Portsmouth
- Dorothy Maijor, consort, was born in Hursley
- Alan Mais, surveyor, was born in Southampton
- Peregrine Maitland, colonial governor, was born in Longparish
- Arthur Malet, actor, was born in Lee on the Solent
- Tom Maley, football manager, was born in Portsmouth
- Anne-Marie Mallik, actor, was born in Fordingbridge
- Simon Mann, mercenary, was born in Aldershot
- Herbert Manners, cricketer, was born in Hartley Wintney
- Olivia Manning, novelist, was born in Portsmouth
- Richard Mant, bishop, was born in Southampton
- John Maples, politician, was born in Fareham
- Stephen Marcus, actor, was born in Portsmouth
- Margaret of York, monarch's daughter, was born in Winchester
- Edward Mariner, cricketer, was born in Winchester
- Jessie White Mario, nurse, was born in Gosport
- Paul Marks, cricketer, was born in Southampton
- Laura Marling, singer, was raised in Eversley
- George Marshall, footballer, was born in Southampton
- Charles Martin, cricketer, was born in Breamore
- George Martin, comedian, was born in Aldershot
- John Martin, paralympian, was born in Eastleigh
- William Martin, cricketer, was born in Southampton
- Craig Maskell, footballer, was born in Aldershot
- Tom Mason, footballer, was born in Portsmouth
- Wally Masur, tennis player, was born in Southampton
- Matilda of England, empress, was born in Winchester
- Sally Matthews, opera singer, was born in Southampton
- Charmian May, actor, was born in Purbrook
- John May, cricketer, was born in Southampton
- Kieran McAnespie, footballer, was born in Gosport
- Caitlin McClatchey, swimmer, was born in Portsmouth
- Neil McCorkell, cricketer, was born in Portsmouth
- Dennis McDermott, trade unionist, was born in Portsmouth
- Ian McEwan, novelist, was born in Aldershot
- Charlie McGibbon, footballer, was born in Portsmouth
- Doug McGibbon, footballer, was born in Netley
- Richard McIlwaine, cricketer, was born in Milton
- Arthur McIntyre, cricketer, was born in Hartley Wintney
- Stephen McKay, academic, was born in Aldershot
- Ian McNeice, actor, was born in Basingstoke
- Josh McQuoid, footballer, was born in Southampton
- George Meredith, novelist, was born in Portsmouth
- Sammy Meston, footballer, was born in Southampton
- Jeremy Metcalfe, racing driver, was born in Fleet
- Daniel Middleton, YouTube personality and professional gamer, was born in Aldershot
- Steve Middleton, footballer, was born in Portsmouth
- Tony Middleton, cricketer, was born in Winchester
- Ian Mikardo, politician, was born in Portsmouth
- John Everett Millais, painter, was born in Southampton
- Roger Miller, cricketer, was born in Southampton
- Frank Milligan, cricketer, was born in Farnborough
- Brusher Mills, snake-catcher, was born in Emery Down
- Heather Mills, charity campaigner, was born in Aldershot
- Scott Mills, broadcaster, was born in Eastleigh
- Steve Mills, footballer, was born in Portsmouth
- Ralph Milner, martyr, was born in Slackstead
- Henry Misselbrook, cricketer, was born in Otterbourne
- Mary Russell Mitford, author, was born in New Alresford
- John Moberly, cricketer, was born in Winchester
- Bob Moffat, footballer, was born in Portsmouth
- Harry Moger, footballer, was born in Southampton
- George Monger, soldier, was born in Woodmancott
- Santa Montefiore, novelist, was born in Winchester
- Edwin Moon, pilot, was born in Southampton
- Liam Mooney, entrepreneur, was born in Gosport
- John Moore, cricketer, was born in Winchfield
- Rob Moore, field hockey player, was born in Winchester
- Richie Moran, footballer, was raised in Gosport
- Aubrey Morris, actor, was born in Portsmouth
- Paul Morris, academic, was born in Southampton
- Sarah Jane Morris, singer, was born in Southampton
- Talwin Morris, illustrator, was born in Winchester
- Wolfe Morris, actor, was born in Portsmouth
- James Morrison, politician, was born in Middle Wallop
- John Mortimore, football manager, was born in Farnborough
- Neil Moss, footballer, was born in New Milton
- Olly Moss, graphic designer, was born in Winchester
- Mickie Most, music producer, was born in Aldershot
- Fred Mouncher, footballer, was born in Southampton
- Edwina Mountbatten, socialite, was born in Romsey Extra
- Dominic Muldowney, composer, was born in Southampton
- Albert Mundy, footballer, was born in Gosport
- John Murray, religious minister, was born in Alton
- Rosemary Murray, university vice-chancellor, was born in Havant
- Paul Musselwhite, footballer, was born in Portsmouth

== N ==
- Ñāṇavīra Thera, monk, was born in Aldershot
- Frank Neary, footballer, was born in Aldershot
- Tiff Needell, racing driver, was born in Havant
- Jan Needle, novelist, was born in Portsmouth
- James Newcome, bishop, was born in Aldershot
- Jack Newman, cricketer, was born in Southsea
- Ron Newman, footballer, was born in Fareham
- Tony Newman, drummer, was born in Southampton
- Edward Newton, cricketer, was born in Blackmoor
- Paul Newton, bass guitarist, was born in Andover
- David Nicholls, novelist, was born in Eastleigh
- William Graham Nicholson, politician, was raised in Froxfield
- Donald Nicol, academic, was born in Portsmouth
- Florence Nightingale, lived at Embley Park, buried at St Margaret's Church, East Wellow.
- Arthur Nineham, footballer, was born in Southampton
- Victor Norbury, cricketer, was born in Bartley
- Lee Nurse, cricketer, was born in Basingstoke
- Colin Nutley, film director, was born in Gosport
- John Nyren, cricketer, was born in Hambledon

== O ==
- David Oakes, actor, was born in Fordingbridge
- Tony Oakey, boxer, was born in Portsmouth
- Joe Oastler, footballer, was born in Portsmouth
- James Ockendon, soldier, was born in Portsmouth
- Christian O'Connell, broadcaster, was born in Winchester
- Tom Oliver, actor, was born in Fareham
- Andrew O'Neill, comedian, was born in Portsmouth
- Michael O'Neill, poet, was born in Aldershot
- Thomas Onslow, cricketer, was born in Old Alresford
- Paul O'Prey, author, was born in Southampton
- Martin Orford, keyboard player, was born in Southampton
- Peter Orton, television producer, was born in Portsmouth
- Roland Orzabal, singer, was born in Portsmouth
- Harry Osman, footballer, was born in Bentworth
- Mike Osman, broadcaster, was born in Millbrook
- Alison Owen, film producer, was born in Portsmouth
- Alex Oxlade-Chamberlain, footballer, was born in Portsmouth

== P ==
- Marlon Pack, footballer, was born in Portsmouth
- Chris Packham, naturalist, was born in Southampton
- Bert Paddington, footballer, was born in Bishopstoke
- Jonathan Page, footballer, was born in Portsmouth
- Martin Page, singer, was born in Southampton
- James Paine, architect, was born in Andover
- Terry Paine, footballer, was born in Winchester
- Garrick Palmer, wood engraver, was born in Portsmouth
- Rodney Palmer, cricketer, was born in Sherfield on Loddon
- Tara Palmer-Tomkinson, socialite, was raised in Dummer
- William Paris, cricketer, was born in Old Alresford
- John Parker, cricketer, was born in Portsmouth
- Tom Parker, footballer, was born in Woolston
- Bruce Parry, explorer, was born in Hythe
- Vivienne Parry, journalist, was born in Portsmouth
- Tony Parsons, journalist, was born in Gosport
- Joe Partington, footballer, was born in Portsmouth
- David M Partner, photographer, was born in Winchester
- Alfred Parvin, cricketer, was born in Southampton
- Alan Pascoe, athlete, was born in Portsmouth
- Marcus Patric, actor, was born in Portsmouth
- Josh Payne, footballer, was born in Basingstoke
- John Paynter, pilot, was born in Southsea
- Stanley Pearce, cricketer, was born in Totton
- Walter Pearce, cricketer, was born in Bassett
- Iain Percy, yachtsman, was born in Southampton
- Mark Perego, rugby union player, was born in Winchester
- Russell Perrett, footballer, was born in Barton on Sea
- Andrew Perry, cricketer, was born in Portsmouth
- Brian Perry, ice hockey player, was born in Aldershot
- Seamus Perry, academic, was born in Aldershot
- Henry Persse, cricketer, was born in Portswood
- John Pestell, colonial official, was raised in Portsmouth
- Dorothy Peto, police officer, was born in Emery Down
- William Petty, economist, was born in Romsey
- Edmund Phipps-Hornby, army officer, was born in Emsworth
- Stuart Piggott, archaeologist, was born in Petersfield
- Hew Pike, army commander, was born in Bentley
- Thelwell Pike, footballer, was born in Andover
- Lucy Pinder, model, was born in Winchester
- Robert Pink, academic, was born in Kempshott
- Katie Piper, charity campaigner, was born in Andover
- Raymond Pitman, cricketer, was born in Bartley
- John Pitts, religious scholar, was born in Alton
- Roy Player, footballer, was born in Portsmouth
- William Plowden, politician, was raised in Basingstoke
- William Ponting, footballer, was born in Andover
- Peter Pook, novelist, was raised in Southsea
- Joseph Ellison Portlock, geologist, was born in Gosport
- Arthur Pothecary, cricketer, was born in Southampton
- Sidney Pothecary, cricketer, was born in Southampton
- Ken Pound, footballer, was born in Portsmouth
- Thomas Pounde, religious brother, was born in Farlington
- John Pounds, teacher, was born in Portsmouth
- Budge Pountney, rugby union player, was born in Southampton
- Reg Presley, singer, was born in Andover
- Kevin Pressman, footballer, was born in Fareham
- James Charles Prevost, naval commander, was born in Bedhampton
- Alan Priddy, sailor and adventurer, was born and raised in Portsmouth
- Albert Prince-Cox, football manager, was born in Southsea
- Jason Prior, footballer, was born in Portsmouth
- Edward William Pritchard, murderer, was born in Southsea
- Lawrence Prittipaul, cricketer, was born in Portsmouth
- Ralph Prouton, cricketer, was born in Southampton
- David Puckett, footballer, was born in Southampton
- Sidney Pullen, footballer, was born in Southampton
- Richard Purchase, cricketer, was born in Liss
- George Puttenham, literary critic, was born in Sherfield on Loddon
- Patrick Pye, sculptor, was born in Winchester

== R ==
- Mark Raffety, actor, was born in Portsmouth
- John Ralfs, botanist, was born in Millbrook
- Cyril Raikes, pilot, was born in Swanmore
- Joe Ralls, footballer, was born in Aldershot
- George Randell, politician, was born in New Milton
- Umer Rashid, cricketer, was born in Southampton
- Bill Rawlings, footballer, was born in Andover
- John Frederick Peel Rawlinson, politician, was born in New Alresford
- Robert Raynbird, cricketer, was born in Laverstoke
- Walter Raynbird, cricketer, was born in Basing
- Ernest Read, cricketer, was born in Portsmouth
- Richard Reade, judge, was born in Nether Wallop
- Jamie Redknapp, footballer, was born in Barton on Sea
- Barry Reed, cricketer, was born in Southsea
- Libby Rees, author, was born in Ringwood
- Kevin Reeves, footballer, was born in Burley
- Thomas Reeves, sailor, was born in Portsmouth
- Alex Reid, kickboxer, was born in Aldershot
- Reinald av Stavanger, bishop, was born in Winchester
- Thomas Rennell, theologian, was born in Winchester
- Reg Revans, management consultant, was born in Portsmouth
- Edward Reynolds, bishop, was born in Southampton
- John Russell Reynolds, neurologist, was born in Romsey
- Kurt Reynolds, ice hockey player, was born in Basingstoke
- John Rice, cricketer, was born in Chandler's Ford
- Richard of Cornwall, monarch, was born in Winchester
- Bob Richards, cricketer, was born in Winchester
- Cyril Richards, cricketer, was born in Andover
- Peter Richards, rugby union player, was born in Portsmouth
- Charles Ridding, cricketer, was born in Winchester
- William Ridding, cricketer, was born in Winchester
- Alfred Ridley, cricketer, was born in East Woodhay
- Derek Riggs, painter, was born in Portsmouth
- Les Riggs, footballer, was born in Portsmouth
- Bruce Rioch, football manager, was born in Aldershot
- James Riordan, novelist, was born in Portsmouth
- Michael Ripper, actor, was born in Portsmouth
- Matt Ritchie, footballer, was born in Gosport
- Dave Roberts, footballer, was born in Southampton
- Graham Roberts, footballer, was born in Southampton
- Edward Robinson, sailor, was born in Portsea, Portsmouth
- David Rock, cricketer, was born in Southsea
- Nick Rogers, yachtsman, was born in Lymington
- Paul Rogers, footballer, was born in Portsmouth
- Albie Roles, footballer, was born in Southampton
- Tony Rolt, racing driver, was born in Bordon
- Graham Roope, cricketer, was born in Fareham
- Don Roper, footballer, was born in Botley
- Alec Rose, yachtsman, was born in Portsmouth
- Jordan Rose, footballer, was born in Southampton
- Stuart Rose, businessman, was born in Gosport
- Stella Ross-Craig, illustrator, was born in Aldershot
- Jonathan Routh, broadcaster, was born in Gosport
- Eddie Rowles, footballer, was born in Gosport
- Susanna Rowson, novelist, was born in Portsmouth
- Benjamin Rudyerd, politician, was born in Hartley Wintney
- Ralph Ruffell, footballer, was born in Southampton
- Mary Rundle, naval superintendent, was born in Swaythling
- John Russell, art critic, was born in Fleet
- Ken Russell, film director, was born in Southampton
- Kevin Russell, footballer, was born in Paulsgrove
- Mary Russell, pilot, was born in Stockbridge
- Stuart J. Russell, computer scientist, was born in Portsmouth
- Arnold Rutherford, cricketer, was born in Highclere

== S ==
- George Saintsbury, literary historian, was born in Southampton
- John Salew, actor, was born in Portsmouth
- Guy Salisbury-Jones, vintner, was born in Hambledon
- Nowell Salmon, naval commander, was born in Swarraton
- Jock Salter, footballer, was born in Bitterne
- Lee Sandford, footballer, was born in Basingstoke
- William Sandys, diplomat, was born in Sherborne St John
- Charles Roscoe Savage, photographer, was born in Southampton
- Robert Savage, cricketer, was born in Southampton
- Michael Scammell, biographer, was born in Lyndhurst
- William Scammell, poet, was born in Southampton
- Jon Schofield, canoeist, was born in Petersfield
- Rachel Schofield, journalist, was born in Winchester
- Philip Sclater, zoologist, was born in Wootton St Lawrence
- Charles Kennedy Scott, organist, was born in Romsey
- Edwin Scott, footballer, was born in Portsmouth
- Matthew Scott, cricketer, was born in Portsmouth
- Bert Scriven, footballer, was born in Winsor
- Margaret Scudamore, actor, was born in Portsmouth
- Hugh Seagrim, soldier, was born in Ashmansworth
- Alfred Seal, cricketer, was born in Millbrook
- Ron Searle, politician, was born in Southampton
- Luke Sears, cricketer, was born in Portsmouth
- William Sedgwick, bishop, was born in Freemantle
- Peter Sellers, actor, was born in Southsea
- James Alexander Seton, duellist, was born in Fordingbridge
- Samuel Sewall, judge, was born in Bishopstoke
- Katy Sexton, swimmer, was born in Portsmouth
- Charles Seymour, cricketer, was born in Winchfield
- Clive Shakespeare, guitarist, was born in Southampton
- John Sharpe, footballer, was born in Portsmouth
- John Shearman, art historian, was born in Aldershot
- Edgar Sheldrake, cricketer, was born in Aldershot
- Bert Shelley, footballer, was born in Romsey
- George Shenton, pharmacist, was born in Winchester
- Beatrice Shilling, aeronautical engineer, was born in Waterlooville
- Aaron Shingler, rugby union player, was born in Aldershot
- Lowri Shone, ballet dancer, was born in Winchester
- Ray Shulman, bass guitarist, was born in Portsmouth
- John Sillett, football manager, was born in Southampton
- Peter Sillett, footballer, was born in Southampton
- Tim Sills, footballer, was born in Romsey
- Andrew Simmons, wrestler, was born in Liss
- Terry Simpson, footballer, was born in Southampton
- Richard Skinner, broadcaster, was born in Portsmouth
- Donald Slade, footballer, was born in Southampton
- Harry Slater, politician, was born in Portsmouth
- Mark Sloan, wrestler, was born in Portsmouth
- Henry Small, footballer, was born in Southampton
- Kathy Smallwood-Cook, athlete, was born in Winchester
- Andy Smart, comedian, was born in Southsea
- David Smith, boccia player, was born in Eastleigh
- Digby Smith, military historian, was born in Aldershot
- George Smith, footballer, was born in Portsmouth
- George D. W. Smith, materials scientist, was born in Aldershot
- Hugh Smith, cricketer, was born in Lasham
- John Derek Smith, biologist, was born in Southampton
- Jolyon Brettingham Smith, composer, was born in Southampton
- Sarah Smith, singer, was raised in Widley
- Sean Smith, singer, was raised in Widley
- Sydney Philip Smith, pilot, was born in Aldershot
- Victor Smith, footballer, was born in Southampton
- George Smoker, cricketer, was born in Ovington
- Henry Smoker, cricketer, was born in Hinton Ampner
- Martin Snape, painter, was born in Gosport
- Steve Snell, cricketer, was born in Winchester
- Thomas D'Oyly Snow, army commander, was born in Newton Valence
- Tom Solesbury, rower, was born in Farnborough
- Clare Solomon, politician, was born in Winchester
- Caroline Anne Southey, poet, was born in Buckland
- Nigel Spackman, footballer, was born in Romsey
- Adolphus Sparrow, cricketer, was born in Alverstoke
- Joshua Spencer-Smith, cricketer, was born in Fareham
- Orlando Spencer-Smith, cricketer, was born in Fareham
- Tim Spicer, arms dealer, was born in Aldershot
- Isaac Spratt, toy dealer, was born in Ibsley
- William Spry, army commander, was born in Titchfield
- Lisbee Stainton, singer, was raised in Basingstoke
- Lorraine Stanley, actor, was born in Portsmouth
- Len Stansbridge, footballer, was born in Southampton
- Bill Stead, footballer, was born in Portsea, Portsmouth
- Robert Steadman, composer, was raised in Basingstoke
- Anne Steele, hymnwriter, was born in Broughton
- David Steele, cricketer, was born in Southampton
- Catharni Stern, sculptor, was born in Southsea
- Herbert Stewart, army commander, was born in Sparsholt
- Kris Stewart, football executive, was born in Portsmouth
- William Stewart, cricketer, was born in Sparsholt
- Brian Stock, footballer, was born in Winchester
- Julian Stockwin, novelist, was born in Basingstoke
- Bobby Stokes, footballer, was born in Portsmouth
- Mitchell Stokes, cricketer, was born in Basingstoke
- John Stonehouse, politician, was born in Southampton
- Mike Stowell, footballer, was born in Portsmouth
- John Straffen, murderer, was born in Bordon
- Gary Streeter, politician, was born in Gosport
- David Stride, footballer, was born in Lymington
- William Strugnell, pilot, was born in Southampton
- Rob Styles, football referee, was born in Waterlooville
- Murray Sueter, naval commander, was born in Alverstoke
- George Summerbee, footballer, was born in Winchester
- Rishi Sunak, politician, was born in Southampton
- Sarah Sutton, actor, was born in Basingstoke
- John Sydenham, footballer, was born in Southampton
- Peter Symonds, merchant, was born in Winchester
- Kit Symons, footballer, was born in Basingstoke
- Katy Stephens, Actress/presenter was born in Southampton

== T ==
- Basil Talbot, cricketer, was born in Southsea
- Charles Tannock, politician, was born in Aldershot
- Bradley Tarbuck, footballer, was born in Emsworth
- Walter George Tarrant, builder, was born in Gosport
- Edward Tate, cricketer, was born in Lyndhurst
- Frederick Tate, cricketer, was born in Lyndhurst
- Henry Tate, cricketer, was born in Lyndhurst
- Saint Cyprian Tayler, pilot, was born in Winchester
- Billy Taylor, cricketer, was born in Southampton
- George Taylor, cricketer, was born in Havant
- James Taylor, cricketer, was born in Southampton
- Kerrie Taylor, actor, was born in Romsey
- Peter Taylor, film editor, was born in Portsmouth
- Scott Taylor, footballer, was born in Portsmouth
- Thomas William Taylor, politician, was born in Portsmouth
- Walter Taylor, wooden block maker, was born in Southampton
- Suzie Templeton, animator, was raised in Highfield
- Sean Terry, cricketer, was born in Southampton
- Caryl Thain, cricketer, was born in Catherington
- William Thoburn, politician, was born in Portsmouth
- Mary Thomas, diarist, was born in Southampton
- Des Thompson, footballer, was born in Southampton
- Edward Thomson, bishop, was born in Portsea, Portsmouth
- Henry Thomson, painter, was born in Portsea, Portsmouth
- Jake Thomson, footballer, was born in Portsmouth
- Robert Thorne, cricketer, was born in Southampton
- Philip Thresher, cricketer, was born in Hamble le Rice
- Henry Thurston, coachman, was born in Brockenhurst
- Chidiock Tichborne, poet, was born in Southampton
- Nicholas Tichborne, martyr, was born in Hartley Mauditt
- Thomas Tichborne, martyr, was born in Hartley Mauditt
- Annabel Tiffin, journalist, was born in Southampton
- Tanita Tikaram, singer, was raised in Basingstoke
- Brian Timms, cricketer, was born in Ropley
- Mark Tinley, music producer, was born in Lymington
- Edward Tolfree, cricketer, was born in Southampton
- James Tomlinson, cricketer, was born in Winchester
- Alfred Maurice Toye, soldier, was born in Aldershot
- Edward Robert Tregear, linguist, was born in Southampton
- Chris Tremlett, cricketer, was born in Southampton
- Arthur Trollope, cricketer, was born in Eling
- Richard Trowbridge, naval commander, was born in Andover
- Sampson Tubb, cricketer, was born in Broughton
- James Tuck, cricketer, was born in Ringwood
- William Tucker, trader, was born in Portsea, Portsmouth
- Arthur Tudor, prince, was born in Winchester
- Derek Tulk, cricketer, was born in Southampton
- Archie Turner, footballer, was born in Hartley Wintney
- Fred Turner, footballer, was born in Southampton
- Frank Turner, singer/songwriter, born in Meonstoke
- Hanson Victor Turner, soldier, was born in Andover
- Harry Turner, footballer, was born in Farnborough
- Ian Turner, cricketer, was born in Denmead
- John Tutchin, journalist, was born in Lymington
- John Twyne, politician, was born in Bullington

== U ==
- George Ubsdell, cricketer, was born in Southampton
- Shaun Udal, cricketer, was born in Cove
- George Underdown, cricketer, was born in Petersfield
- Arthur Upfield, novelist, was born in Gosport
- Richard Utley, cricketer, was born in Havant

== V ==
- Henry Valder, sawmiller, was born in Southampton
- Geoffrey Van Orden, politician, was born in Waterlooville
- Bobby Veck, footballer, was born in Titchfield
- Adela Verne, pianist, was born in Southampton
- Mathilde Verne, pianist, was born in Southampton
- Mike Vickers, guitarist, was born in Southampton
- Paul Vigay, computer consultant, was raised in Waterloovlle
- Peter Viggers, politician, was born in Gosport
- Rowan Vine, footballer, was born in Basingstoke
- Pelham Von Donop, footballer, was born in Southsea

== W ==
- James Wade, darts player, was born in Aldershot
- Alan Waldron, cricketer, was born in Southsea
- Malcolm Waldron, footballer, was born in Emsworth
- Henry Wallop, politician, was born in Farleigh Wallop
- Henry Wallop, politician, was born in Farleigh Wallop
- John Wallop, diplomat, was born in Farleigh Wallop
- Brian Walsh, footballer, was born in Aldershot
- Joel Ward, footballer, was born in Emsworth
- John Ward, politician, was raised in Appleshaw
- William Warham, archbishop, was born in Malshanger
- Elijah Waring, writer, was born in Alton
- Betty Warren, actor, was born in Fareham
- Samantha Warriner, triathlete, was born in Alton
- Thomas Warton, poet, was born in Basingstoke
- Derek Warwick, racing driver, was born in New Alresford
- Paul Warwick, racing driver, was born in New Alresford
- Alan Wassell, cricketer, was born in Fareham
- Aeone Victoria Watson, singer, was born in Liss
- Giz Watson, politician, was born in Eastleigh
- Tom Watson, kickboxer, was born in Southampton
- Alfred Watts, cricketer, was born in Millbrook
- Isaac Watts, hymnwriter, was born in Southampton
- David Weir, footballer, was born in Aldershot
- Daniel Welch, racing driver, was born in Aldershot
- James Welch, soldier, was born in Stratfield Saye
- Dan Wells, racing driver, was born in Southampton
- Jerold Wells, actor, was born in Wallington
- Swithun Wells, martyr, was born in Brambridge
- Alfred John West, photographer, was born in Gosport
- Francis West, colonial governor, was raised in Wherwell
- John West, colonial governor, was born in Testwood
- Thomas West, privy councillor, was born in Wherwell
- John Portsmouth Football Club Westwood, renowned football supporter, was born in Liss
- Alf Wheeler, footballer, was born in Fareham
- William Whitcher, cricketer, was born in Emsworth
- Gary White, football manager, was born in Southampton
- Gilbert White, naturalist, was born in Selborne
- Jamie White, footballer, was born in Southampton
- Peter White, journalist, was born in Winchester
- Thomas White, cricketer, was born in Basingstoke
- Edward Whitehead, advertising mascot, was born in Aldershot
- William Whiting, footballer, was born in Southampton
- George Byrom Whittaker, publisher, was born in Southampton
- Tom Whittaker, football manager, was born in Aldershot
- Mabel Wickham, painter, was born in Fleet
- Tom Wild, cricketer, was born in Southampton
- Gabriella Wilde, actor, was born in Basingstoke
- Len Wilkins, footballer, was born in Southampton
- Chris Wilkinson, tennis player, was born in Southampton
- Maurice Wilks, automotive engineer, was born in Hayling Island
- Edmund Willes, cricketer, was born in Dibden Purlieu
- William of Wykeham, bishop, was born in Wickham
- Christine Williams, model, was born in Basingstoke
- David Williams, academic, was born in Lasham
- George Williams, cricketer, was born in Aldershot
- James Williams, bishop, was born in Overton
- Ursula Moray Williams, novelist, was born in Petersfield
- James G. Willie, missionary, was born in Murrell Green
- Joseph Willoughby, cricketer, was born in Aldershot
- Pippa Wilson, yachtswoman, was born in Southampton
- Paul Wimbleton, footballer, was born in Havant
- Dave Winfield, footballer, was born in Aldershot
- Pete Wingfield, singer, was born in Liphook
- George Winter, painter, was born in Portsea, Portsmouth
- Donald Wiseman, archaeologist, was born in Emsworth
- George Wither, poet, was born in Bentworth
- Ted Withers, footballer, was born in Ower
- William Withers, settler, was born in Portsmouth
- Arthur Wood, cricketer, was born in Bentworth
- Arthur Wood, footballer, was born in Southampton
- Chris Wood, cricketer, was born in Basingstoke
- Julian Wood, cricketer, was born in Winchester
- Ross Wood, cricket umpire, was born in Basingstoke
- Kim Woodburn, cleaner, was born in Portsmouth
- John Woodcock, journalist, was born in Longparish
- George Woodford, footballer, was born in Lymington
- Charles Woodmason (ca. 1720–1789), Anglican clergyman and apologist, American loyalist, leader of the South Carolina Regulator Movement. Also, a published poet, musical editor, and responsible for the Handel organ being moved from Canongate to Holy Trinity Church, Gosport
- Harry Ellis Wooldridge, musical antiquary, was born in Winchester
- Ian Wooldridge, journalist, was born in New Milton
- Janet Wright, British-Canadian actress (1945–2016), was born in Farnhorough
- David Wynne, sculptor, was born in Lyndhurst

== Y ==
- Charles Yaldren, cricketer, was born in Southampton
- Christopher Yates, cricketer, was born in Aldershot
- Frances Yates, historian, was born in Southsea
- Peter Yates, film director, was born in Aldershot
- Joanna Yeates, murder victim, was raised in Ampfield
- James Lucas Yeo, naval commander, was born in Southampton
- Harry Yeomans, footballer, was born in Farnborough
- Charlotte Mary Yonge, novelist, was born in Otterbourne
- Charles Yorke, naval commander, was born in Hamble le Rice
- Arthur Young, police commissioner, was born in Eastleigh
- Bob Young, songwriter, was born in Basingstoke
