= Leat (disambiguation) =

A leat is an artificial watercourse dug into the ground. The term may also refer to:

== People ==
- Adrian Leat (born 1987), New Zealand judoka
- Alia Leat (born 2005), English artistic gymnast
- Alister Leat (1985–2014), New Zealand judoka
- Anna Leat (born 2001), New Zealand footballer
- Charles Leat (1855–1937), English cricketer
- Edwin Leat (1885–1918), English cricketer
- Rayne Leat (born 1998), English wrestler performing as Lizzy Rain

== Places ==
- Levate, Lombardy, known as Leàt in the Bergamasque dialect
- Leat, Nebraska
- Leat Island, Texas
