= Alf Wheeler =

Alf or Alfred Wheeler may refer to:

- Alf Wheeler (footballer, born 1910) (1910–1978), English footballer who played for Walsall, Northampton Town, Southampton and Gillingham
- Alf Wheeler (footballer, born 1922) (1922–2013), English footballer who played for Blackburn Rovers and Swindon Town
- Alfred Wheeler (composer) (1865–1949), Australian composer
- Alf Wheeler (Australian footballer) (1885–1929), Australian rules footballer
- Alfred Wheeler (cricketer) (1845–?), English cricketer
- Alfred G. Wheeler (1899–1982), American football and basketball player and coach
