= Bulbeck =

Bulbeck may refer to:

- 17th Earl of Oxford, Lord Bulbeck (1550–1604), English peer and courtier of the Elizabethan era
- John Bulbeck (born 1818), English cricketer
- Matthew Bulbeck (born 1979), former English First-class and List A cricketer
- Swaffham Bulbeck, village in East Cambridgeshire, England

== See also ==
- Swaffham Bulbeck Lode, man-made waterway, Cambridgeshire, England
- Swaffham Bulbeck Priory, priory in Cambridgeshire, England
