= Binley =

Binley may refer to:

== Places ==
- Binley, Coventry, a district of Coventry, West Midlands, England
  - Binley Woods, a village in the Rugby borough of Warwickshire, England, formerly called "Binley"
- Binley, Hampshire, a place in Hampshire, England

== People ==
- Brian Binley (1942-2020), British politician, Conservative Party Member of Parliament for Northampton South 2005-2015
- Margaret Binley, 18th-century English silversmith
