= Pothecary =

Pothecary is the surname of three cricketers:

- Sidney Pothecary (1886–1976), played for Hampshire 1912–1920
- Arthur Pothecary (1906–1991), played for Hampshire 1927–1946, later an umpire
- Jim Pothecary (1933–2016), played for South Africa and Western Province in the 1950s–1960s
