= William Clement =

William Clement may refer to:

- Bill Clement (rugby union) (1915–2007), rugby union player from Wales
- Bill Clement (born 1950), ice hockey player from Canada
- William Clement (academic) (1707–1782), Irish academic
- William James Clement (1802–1870), English surgeon and Liberal Party politician
- William Innell Clement (1780–1852), English newspaper proprietor
- William Pope Clement (1887–1982), lawyer and politician in Ontario, Canada
- William T. Clement (1897–1955), general of the United States Marine Corps during World War II
- Willy Clément (1918–1965), French baritone
- William Clement (cricketer) (1820–1864), English cricketer
- William Clement (priest) (died 1711), English priest
- William Clement (clockmaker) (1638-1704), British clockmaker, inventor of the Grandfather clock

== See also ==
- William Clements (disambiguation)
