= Partner (surname) =

Partner is also a surname. Notable people with the surname include:

- Andy Partner (born 1974), English footballer
- David Partner (born 1956), British portrait photographer
- Peter Partner (1924–2015), British historian

== See also ==
- Partner (disambiguation)
