= Pardner =

Pardner or pardners may refer to:

- Pardners, a 1956 American comedy movie
- Pardners (1917 film), a lost 1917 American silent film
- Pardner shotgun, manufactured by H&R Firearms

== See also ==
- Partner (disambiguation)
