= Raymond Flood =

Raymond Flood may refer to:

- Raymond Flood (mathematician), British mathematician at University of Oxford and Gresham College
- Raymond Flood (cricketer) (1935–2014), English cricketer
