= Landles =

Landles is a surname. Notable people with this surname include:

- Iain Landles, English playwright and novelist
- William Landles (1923–2016), Scottish artist and sculptor
