= Nick Buchanan =

Nick Buchanan can refer to:

- Nick Buchanan (English cricketer) (born 1990), English cricketer
- Nick Buchanan (Australian cricketer) (born 1991), Australian cricketer
