= The News (Portsmouth) =

Local newspaper for Portsmouth, England

- Type: Daily newspaper
- Format: Compact
- Owner: National World
- Founder: Samuel Storey
- Publisher: Portsmouth Publishing & Printing
- Editor: Print Editor Chris Broom / Digital Editor Kelly Brown
- Founded: 1873
- Language: English
- Headquarters: Technopole, Kingston Crescent, North End, Portsmouth, PO2 8FA
- Circulation: 6,642 (as of 2023)
- Sister newspapers: The Portsmouth View
- Website: portsmouth.co.uk

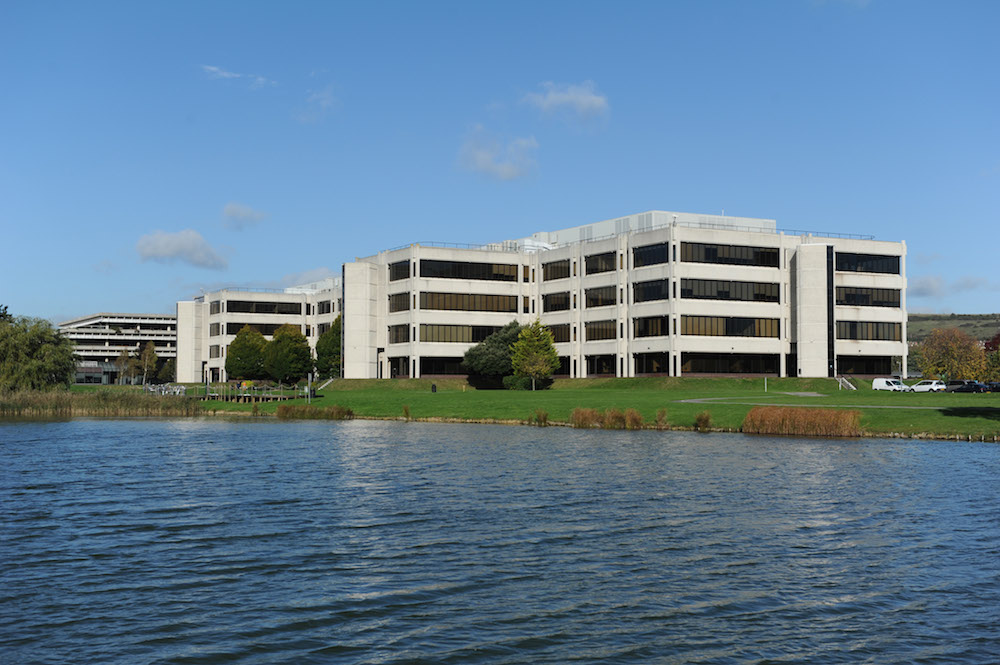
The former headquarters and newsroom of The News, at 1000 Lakeside

The News is the only local paid-for newspaper and website in Portsmouth, England, and covers a wide area of south Hampshire. It is produced by NationalWorld at their office at the Technopole building. Its official title is The News, though it was formerly known as The Portsmouth Evening News and is still popularly referred to as The Evening News despite being printed in the early hours of the morning.

The News is printed Monday to Saturday. There was also a weekly sports paper, The Sports Mail, which followed the fortunes of local club Portsmouth F.C. and local sports news. Sales have declined rapidly following price rises and the rise of social media.

== History ==
The News began in the North East in 1873, when Samuel Storey MP founded The Echo in Sunderland. Together with six partners and an original investment of £3,500, Storey hoped to produce an evening paper that reflected his radical views.

Storey was elected into Parliament as the mayor, where he met future business partner Andrew Carnegie, a Scottish born millionaire. The partners, along with businessman, Passmore Edwards, arrived in Portsmouth in 1883 with intentions of buying out the Hampshire Telegraph and starting a new evening newspaper, the Southern Standard.

By this time, The Evening News had already been established in Portsmouth by Graham Niven, who served as the paper's editor, manager, reporter and distributor. Both Storey and Niven faced a problem when they realised there was no room for two evening papers in Portsmouth. Niven soon sold out to Storey, retaining one quarter share.

Storey's original project, The Southern Standard only survived for eight issues. When the Storey-Carnegie syndicate broke up in 1885, Storey invested in various other papers expanding his newspaper company to West Sussex, Chichester and the Isle of Wight.

In 1903 Samuel Storey's son Frederick George took over from his father as the managing director of The Echo. When Frederick died in 1924 it was his son, also named Samuel Storey born in 1896, who was to begin the third generation of the Storey family in control of the newspaper group. The original founder of the group died in 1925.

During his 49 years as chairman of his grandfather's company, which had since become Portsmouth and Sunderland Newspapers Limited (P&SN), Lord Buckton guided the company through the technological advances of the 1950 and 1960s. Aided by his brother F.G.H Storey, P&SN explored the new processes of photo-composition and web-offset printing.

The final member of the Storey family to become chairman at the company was Sir Richard Storey, who stepped down in June 1998. Sir Stephen Waley-Cohen took over as chairman at P&SN until the company was sold to Johnston Press in July 1999. The News has remained in the control of Johnston Press, whose slogan is "Life is Local". It was bought by National World in January 2021

In 2000 the paper launched the "We can do it" awards recognising "unsung heroes" in the community. It continues to host awards promoting and highlighting the city's local businesses.

The News' current editor is Kelly Brown

=== Offices ===
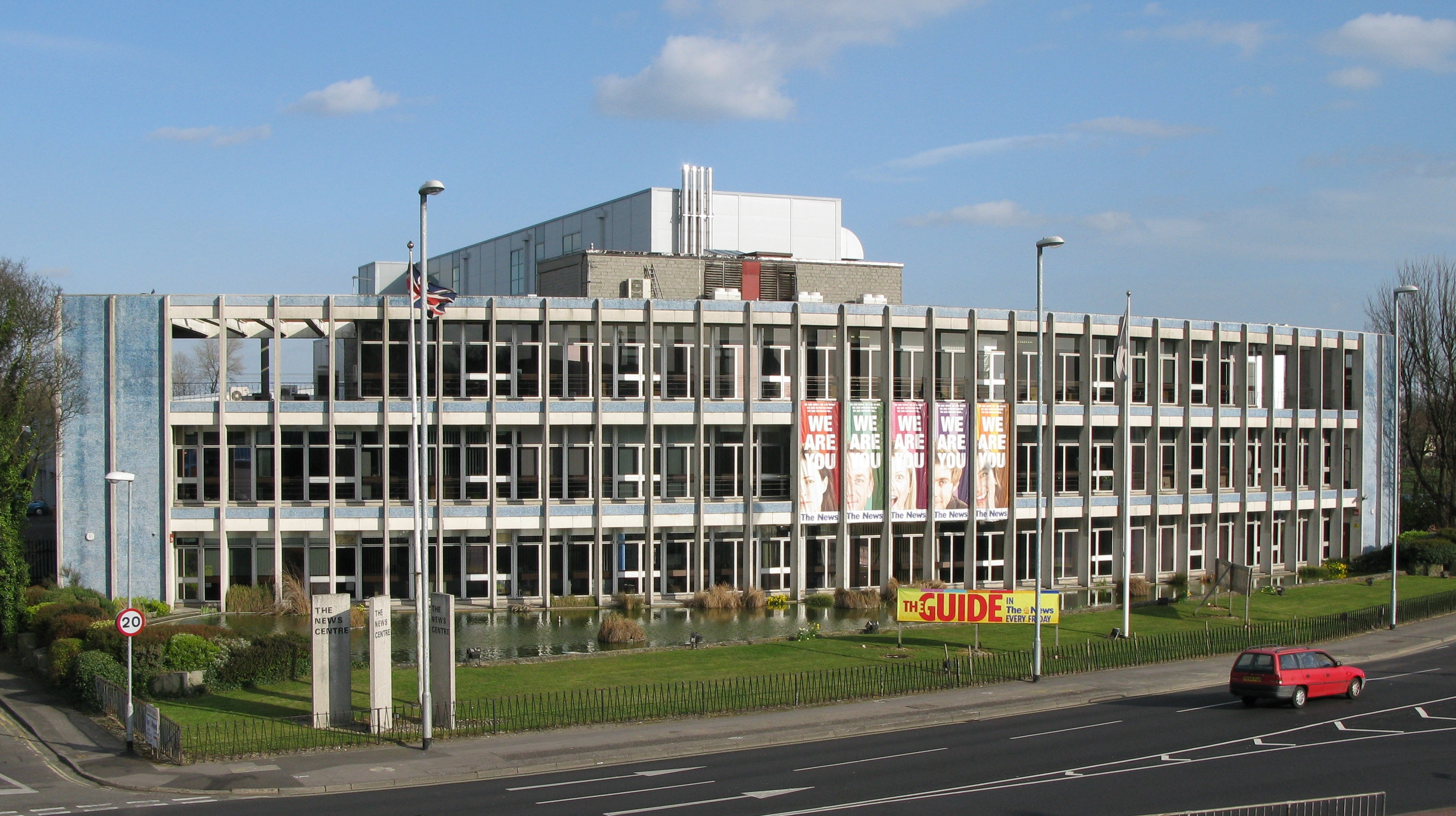
The former offices of The News, in Hilsea

For many years, the newspaper was based out of offices in a former slaughterhouse in Portsmouth's Stanhope Road. In 1969, The News moved from the centre of Portsmouth to a new location in Hilsea, under the supervision of Ted Galpin, a Director and general manager (South) of P&SN. Galpin was subsequently made an OBE for his services to the newspaper industry, an honour he dedicated to his staff. When Lord Buckton died in 1978 his son Richard (who inherited his father's baronetcy) assumed the role of chairman of the company.

In 1982 an £11 million plan to develop The News Centre was announced. This hoped to provide the latest equipment for editorial, marketing, production and administration departments.

The extension was opened in 1983 by Kenelm Storey, the son of the former chairman, who became the fifth generation of the family to be involved with the company. In the following years, southern editions of a number of national newspapers have been printed at the News Centre, using the time when the presses are not needed to print evening papers.

In April 2013, The News announced it would be closing its Hilsea headquarters and moving to new offices in Portsmouth's former IBM headquarters at Lakeside in North Harbour. The newspaper's newsroom, advertising, newspaper sales, finance, IT, and front counter staff moved to the new headquarters in June. The former News Centre site is now being demolished to make way for a new bus depot.

In 2023 editorial staff moved to their current office at the Technopole building in Portsmouth.
