= William Clements (disambiguation) =

Bill Clements (1917–2011) was Governor of Texas.

William Clements may also refer to:

- William Clements (Baltimore MP) (1733–1770), Irish politician, MP for Baltimore 1761–1768
- Bill Clements (American football), American football player and coach
- Bill Clements (Australian footballer) (1933–2025), Australian rules footballer
- William Clements, 3rd Earl of Leitrim (1806–1878), Anglo-Irish nobleman
- William L. Clements (1861–1934), American book and manuscript collector
- William Clements High School in Texas, established in 1983

== See also ==
- William Clemens (disambiguation)
- William Clement (disambiguation)
