= Peter Brown (footballer, born 1934) =

English footballer

Personal information
- Full name: Peter Barry Brown
- Date of birth: 13 July 1934
- Place of birth: Andover, England
- Date of death: 8 December 2011 (aged 77)
- Place of death: Andover, England
- Height: 5 ft 7 in (1.70 m)
- Position: Outside forward

Youth career
- Andover Old Boys

Senior career*
Years	Team	Apps	(Gls)
1952–1958	Southampton	16	(3)
1958–1960	Wrexham	33	(9)
1960–1962	Poole Town		
1962–1963	Dorchester Town		
1963–19??	Andover		
- * Club domestic league appearances and goals

Peter Barry Brown (13 July 1934 – 8 December 2011) was an English footballer who played as a forward for Southampton and Wrexham in the 1950s.

== Football career ==
Brown was born in Andover, Hampshire and joined Southampton as a part-time professional in January 1952, while continuing his trade as a sign-writer. Later that year, he was called up for national service which he spent with the Royal Army Medical Corps (RAMC) at Crookham Camp, near Aldershot. He returned to Southampton in 1954, when he became a full-time professional, making his debut in the first team on 30 April 1954 at Norwich City. He played at outside-right in place of John Flood; the match ended in a 1–0 defeat, with Brown missing a chance to level the scores.

He spent most of his time at The Dell in the reserves, making three first team appearances at the end of the 1954–55 season, again as a replacement for Flood, with his first goal coming in a 5–3 victory at Colchester United on 30 April. Brown played the first five matches of the following season, scoring against Ipswich Town with a "splendid individual effort" on 24 August 1955; he then gave way to Flood before making a further four appearances towards the end of the season. With Terry Paine beginning to establish himself at outside-right, Brown's first team appearances became more infrequent and in July 1958 he was transferred to Wrexham.

He stayed with the Welsh club for two years, during which time he scored nine goals from 33 league appearances.

== Later career ==
In 1960, he returned to Southampton, where he worked as a timekeeper in Southampton Docks, while continuing to play Non-League football with Poole Town, Dorchester Town and Andover.

He moved to Andover, where he worked for Test Valley Borough Council as a repairs inspector. He later owned the Cabin Café, in Bridge Street, Andover.

His son, Kevan was a trainee at Southampton before joining Brighton and Hove Albion in 1987, where he made 53 league appearances.

Peter Brown died in the Willow Court Nursing Home in Andover on 8 December 2011, following a long battle against Parkinson's disease.
