= William Clemens =

William Clemens may refer to:

- William Clemens (film director) (1905–1980), American film director
- William A. Clemens Jr. (1932–2020), paleontologist
- William Clemens (public servant) (1873–1941), Australian public servant
- William Roger Clemens (born 1962), baseball player

== See also ==
- William Clements (disambiguation)
