= Frederick Freemantle =

English cricketer (1871–1943)

Personal information
- Full name: Frederick William Freemantle
- Born: 27 June 1871; Binley, Hampshire, England
- Died: 12 September 1943 (aged 72); Houghton, Hampshire, England
- Batting: Right-handed
- Bowling: Fast-medium

Domestic team information
- Years: Team
- 1900: Hampshire

Career statistics
Competition	First-class
Matches	2
Runs scored	28
Batting average	9.33
100s/50s	–/–
Top score	26
Balls bowled	120
Wickets	0
Bowling average	–
5 wickets in innings	–
10 wickets in match	–
Best bowling	–
Catches/stumpings	–/–
- Source: Cricinfo, 2 January 2009

Frederick William Freemantle (27 June 1871 – 12 September 1943) was an English first-class cricketer.

Freemantle was born in June 1871 at Binley, Hampshire. He made two appearances in first-class cricket for Hampshire in the 1900 County Championship, against Kent and Leicestershire at Southampton. Playing in the Hampshire side as a fast-medium bowler, he went wicketless across both matches, while with the bat he scored 28 runs with a highest score of 26. Freemantle died in September 1943 at Houghton, Hampshire.
