= Harold Frank =

American abstract expressionist artist

Harold Frank (1917–1995) was an American abstract expressionist artist, born in Southampton, England.

== Life and career ==
Born in England in 1917, Harold Frank and his family immigrated to the United States via Ellis Island. He was brought up in the tenements of New York and showed a talent for drawing when young. Feeling the angst of the great depression and World War II, his search for answers to the meaning of life lead him to take up abstract expressionism:

I can live with the abstract. Life is a mystery.

After some time in the US Army, he traveled to Paris to study and returned to New York in the 1950s. He attended the New York Art Students League, the National Academy of Design, Pratt Institute, Chouinard Art Institute, and UCLA, where he was a colleague of Richard Diebenkorn, who had a lasting influence on his work. Other artists who affected his creative philosophy included De Kooning, Matisse, Picasso, and Rouault.

He had an extensive one-man and group exhibition record and he was shown internationally in London, Paris, Amsterdam and Aubonne, Switzerland, as well as throughout the United States from the 1960s through to the 1980s. His awards included the Adolph and Clara Obrig Award and the Sudam Silver Medal from the National Academy of Design; the National Watercolor Society's Grumbacher Award; the John Marin Memorial Award in the Watercolor U.S.A. Show and a First Prize from the Laguna Beach Museum of Art.

His subject matter included pure abstracts, landscapes, still lifes and the male and female head and figure. As many artists have done, he explored variations of each subject, experimenting with changes in medium, technique, light and color. His paintings of the female head and form quickly developed into a vehicle for his abstract interpretations. He used very quick brushwork and often labored over several pieces at the same time.

Sometimes I work on three or four things at a time. I need large pots of paint with brushes in each one. I like to use mixed media because it affords new possibilities and surprises of texture and effect. The whites are a mixture of enamel and acrylic paint. I might, for example, have three cans of white paint of varying degrees of thickness. Once I came across a can of brown paint which had to have been fifteen years old. It was almost acidified. It was beautiful and I used the hell out of it.

His colors are rooted in the creative freedom of the Fauvists and were applied with a craftsman's confidence and expertise.

I use a fluid and fast brush stroke. My paints are wet. I draw while I paint like Soutine did. As I get caught up in a painting, there seems to be a chemical change--I feel a shortness of breath, an excitement. This is the exuberance of creativity. It is passionate, impulsive. Sometimes I should stop. My body cries out, 'Stop, stop,' but I say, 'No, no, I cannot stop.

He led a reclusive and introspective life, yet when asked, he communicated his creative experience with eloquence:

When I stand at a canvas I know what I am doing. I am both humble and proud. I am both knowing and not knowing. I am strong and fragile. I am all of those things.

Harold Frank died in Los Angeles, California, USA, in 1995.

== Education ==
- National Academy of Design, New York, 1936
- Art Students League, New York, 1937
- Pratt Institute, Brooklyn, New York
- Chouinard Art Institute, Los Angeles
- University of California (Los Angeles)

According to the Social Security Death Index found on Ancestry.com, Harold Frank was born in Poland on April 21, 1917 (not 1921).

== Selected solo exhibitions ==
- Savage Gallery, London, England, 1960
- Galerij Werking, Amsterdam, Netherlands, 1960
- Ardail-Castro Gallery, Paris, France, 1960
- Pasadena Art Museum, Pasadena, California, 1962
- Ryder Gallery, Los Angeles, California, 1964
- Ankrum Gallery, Los Angeles, California, 1964
- Gallerie Chantepierre, Aubonne, Switzerland, 1966
- Haggenmmaker Gallery, Beverly Hills, California, 1966
- Irene Neuman Galleries (with Ernest Halpern), Los Angeles, California, 1968
- Emerson Gallery, Encino, California, 1973
- Otis Art Institute, Los Angeles, California, 1977
- Chester House Gallery, Chester, Vermont, 1977
- L'Atelier Gallerie, Carmel, California, 1978
- Upstairs Downstairs, Laguna Beach, California, 1979
- International Student Center, UCLA, 1984
- Robert Zehil Gallery, Beverly Hills, California, 1986
- Front Porch/Human Arts Gallery, West Los Angeles, California, 1987
- Soho Gallery, Studio City, California, 2002 (first posthumous exhibition)

== Selected group exhibitions ==
- Los Angeles County Museum of Art, Los Angeles, California, 1959
- National Water Color Society Traveling Exhibition, 1965–1968, 1971–1973
- San Diego Museum of Art, San Diego, California, 1966
- Municipal Art Gallery (Barnsdall Park), Los Angeles, California, 1969
- KCET Television Auction, Los Angeles, California, 1968, 1969
- Pasadena Art Museum, Pasadena, California, 1971, 1972
- Water Color USA, 1968, 1970, 1971, 1973, 1974, 1980
- Virginia Museum of Fine Arts, Richmond, Virginia, 1970, 1975
- Springfield Art Museum, Springfield, Missouri, 1977–1979
- Butler Institute of American Art, Youngstown, Ohio, 1977–1979
- William Grant Still Community Arts Center, "Artists Against Hunger," Los Angeles, California, 1985
- Otis Art Institute, Los Angeles, California, 1988
- Salander-O'Reilly Galleries, Beverly Hills, California, 1992

== Selected awards ==
- John Marin Memorial Award, Watercolor USA, 1968
- Honor Award, University of Judaism, School of Fine Arts, Los Angeles, California, 1969
- Certificate of Merit, National Academy of Design, New York, 1975
- All California Show, Laguna Beach Museum of Art, Laguna Beach, California, 1976
- Grumbacher Award, National Watercolor Society, 1976
- The Adolph and Clara Obrig Prize, National Academy of Design, New York, 1977, 1978
- Miles Blatt Award, National Watercolor Society, 1979
- Certificate of Merit, Watercolor USA Honor Society, 1986

== Selected reviews ==
- Leverque, Jean-Jacques. "Eloge de l'effervescence," Sens Plasticque, 1961
- Carles, Henry Galy. "Les Exhibitions a Paris," Aujourd'hui, 1961
- Who's Who in Art, 1971–1972
- Johnson, Judy, "Poetic Overflow," Southwest Art, June 1980
- Bordeau, Jean-Luc. "A Feminine Ideal", Robert Zehil Gallery, Exhibition Catalogue, 1986
- Los Angeles Times, 1965, 1985
- Welles, Eleanor. Artscene, Los Angeles, January 1987
- Mugnaini, Joseph. Expressive Drawing, A Schematic Approach, 1989

== Sources ==
- Sandie Stern, Harold Frank, Abstract Expressionist, 1921–1995, Millennium Twelve Two, 2001.
