= Partner =

Partner, Partners, The Partner, or, The Partners may refer to:

== Books ==
- The Partner (Grisham novel), by John Grisham, 1997
- The Partner (Prieto novel), by Jenaro Prieto, 1928
- The Partners (book), a 1983 book by James B. Stewart
- Partner (manga), a Japanese Shōjo manga by Miho Obana

== Companies and brands ==
- Partner Communications Company, an Israeli wireless telecommunications service provider
- Peugeot Partner, a vehicle made by the French car manufacturer Peugeot
- Peugeot Partner Rapid, a rebranded version of the Brazilian Fiat Fiorino
- Honda Partner, a vehicle made by Honda, also known as Honda Orthia
- Partners HealthCare, a not-for-profit healthcare organization in Massachusetts

== Film ==
- Partners (1912 film), a film by Colin Campbell (director)
- Partners (1916 film), a film directed by Hobart Henley
- Partners (1932 film), a Western directed by Fred Allen
- Partner (1968 film), an Italian film directed by Bernardo Bertolucci
- Partners (1976 film), a film directed by Don Owen
- Partners (1982 film), a film directed by James Burrows, starring Ryan O'Neal and John Hurt
- Partners (1993 film), an American short film
- Partner (2007 film), an Indian Hindi-language film directed by David Dhawan, starring Salman Khan and Govinda
- Partner (2008 film), an Indian Bengali-language film directed by Shankar Ray
- Partners (2009 film), an action film set in New York City
- The Partner (1963 film), a British film
- The Partner (2013 film), a Japanese-Vietnamese television film
- Partner (2023 film), an Indian Tamil-language comedy-drama film

== Television ==
- The Partner (2004 TV series), an unaired American reality series planned for broadcast by Fox in 2004
- The Partner (2017 TV series), an American reality show that aired on CNBC in 2017
- The Partners, an American sitcom that aired on NBC in 1971–1972
- Partners (1995 TV series), an American sitcom that aired on Fox 1995–1996
- Partners (2012 TV series), an American sitcom that aired on CBS in 2012
- Partners (2014 TV series), an American sitcom that aired on FX in 2014
- Partners (2017 TV series), an Indian series

=== Episodes ===
- "Partners" (Homicide: Life on the Street), 1995
- "Partners" (MacGyver), 1987
- "Partners" (Never the Twain), 1983
- "Partners" (Renegade), 1992
- "Partners" (Spider-Man: The Animated Series), 1997
- "Partners", a 2024 episode of the Indian series Bujji and Bhairava

== Music ==
- Partner (band), Canadian indie rock band
- Partners (Scherrie & Susaye album), 1979
- Partners (Willie Nelson album), 1986
- Partners (Paul Bley & Gary Peacock album), 1991
- Partners (Barbra Streisand album), 2014
- Partners (Peter Broderick album), 2016
- Partners, a 1992 album by Flaco Jiménez

== Other uses ==
- Partner (business rank), in accounting, consulting, financial, or law firms
- Partner (card game)
- Partner (cigarette)
- Partner dances, choreographed for pairs
- Partner (horse), a thoroughbred racehorse born 1718
- Partners (statue), a statue depicting Walt Disney holding the hand of Mickey Mouse
- Partner (surname), for people with this name

== See also ==
- Pardners, 1956 American comedy western film
- Partnership
- Business partner
- Sexual partner
- Significant other, spouse, husband, or wife
- Cooperative participants in various activities:
  - Tennis doubles
  - Contract bridge
