= Ted Galpin =

Edward Thomas William Galpin OBE (4 July 1914 – 3 September 1996) was general manager (South) of Portsmouth and Sunderland Newspapers Ltd. from 1962 to 1976 and a director until 1979.

Galpin was made an Officer of the Order of the British Empire (OBE) in 1977 for his services to the newspaper industry. As general manager (South) and a director of the Portsmouth and Sunderland Newspapers, Galpin was responsible for introducing web offset printing to the Portsmouth Evening News and managing the newspaper's move to its Hilsea location in 1969. This made the newspaper the first newspaper in the world with a circulation of over 100,000 copies to use computerised printing technology and colour photocomposition.

== Military career ==
After completing Officer Cadet training, Galpin was promoted to 2nd Lieutenant of the Royal Regiment of Artillery on 19 September 1943. He was awarded a variety of medals for his military service including the Efficiency Medal.

During the Second World War, Galpin was a member of the Royal Artillery regiment, where he served in Portsmouth during the Battle of Britain. He then served overseas in North Africa, most notably in the Second Battle of El Alamein. Following his service in North Africa, and the Middle East, he was transferred to the infantry and fought in Italy; here, he was wounded in action before returning to the front line.

== Portsmouth and Sunderland Newspapers Ltd. ==
Galpin's career at the newspaper group began in 1933 when he started work as a junior clerk in the London office.

He resumed his newspaper career after the war in 1946 and, after attending night school, qualified as a chartered secretary in 1948. In the following years he was Company Secretary at the London office and in 1962 he was promoted to general manager (South) and a director of the company in Portsmouth.

In this latter role, he managed the move to web offset printing and computerised photocomposition in 1969. As part of this, the newspaper moved to a new production plant at Hilsea, where The News is still printed today. The Evening News was consequently at the forefront of technological advancements in the newspaper industry, with the technology eventually adopted by most newspapers in the UK.

The move from so-called ‘hot-type’ to ‘cold-type’ typesetting (photocomposition) streamlined the production process and allowed newspapers to be printed much more quickly than in the past. It was local newspapers rather than the nationals which were ‘leading the computer revolution’ in the industry. By managing this process in Portsmouth, Galpin "guided the destinies of both daily and weekly newspapers into an era of clarity of print which was inconceivable at the threshold of his career".

He retired as general manager in 1976 and was awarded his OBE in 1977, the year of the centenary of the Portsmouth Evening News. He accepted his OBE as "recognition of the work of all staff who had maintained uninterrupted publication of the newspapers".
