= Swaffham Bulbeck Priory =

Benedictine nunnery in Cambridgeshire, England

Coordinates: 52.2472°N 0.2813°E

Swaffham Bulbeck Priory was a priory in Cambridgeshire, England.
