= Tom Mason (footballer) =

English footballer

Personal information
- Full name: Thomas Lot Mason
- Date of birth: 23 November 1886
- Place of birth: Portsmouth, England
- Date of death: 1954 (aged 67–68)
- Position: Inside right

Senior career*
| Years | Team | Apps | (Gls) |
| 1911–1912 | Tottenham Hotspur | 7 | (1) |
| | Southend United | 0 | (0) |
| | Sittingbourne | ? | (?) |
- * Club domestic league appearances and goals

Thomas Lot Mason (23 November 1886 – 1954) was an English professional footballer who played for Tottenham Hotspur, Southend United and Sittingbourne.

== Football career ==
Mason began his career at Tottenham Hotspur and competed in seven matches and scoring once between 1911 and 1912. The inside right went on to play for Southend United and finally Sittingbourne.
