= Kevan Brown =

English footballer

Personal information
- Full name: Kevan Barry Brown
- Date of birth: 2 January 1966 (age 60)
- Place of birth: Andover, England
- Height: 5 ft 9 in (1.75 m)
- Position: Full back

Youth career
- Southampton

Senior career*
Years	Team	Apps	(Gls)
1984–1987	Southampton	0	(0)
1987–1988	Brighton & Hove Albion	53	(0)
1988–1992	Aldershot	175	(4)
1992–1998	Woking	354	(6)
1998–2000	Yeovil Town	55	(0)
2000–2001	Woking	25	(0)

International career
1995–1997	England C	5	(0)
- * Club domestic league appearances and goals

Kevan Barry Brown (born 2 January 1966) is an English retired professional footballer who played at full back in the Football League for Brighton & Hove Albion and Aldershot in the 1980s and 1990s, before a career in non-League football.

== Football career ==
Brown was born in Andover, Hampshire, the son of Peter Brown, the former Southampton forward, and his wife, June.

Brown joined Southampton as a trainee in 1982 after signing Associate School Boy Forms in 1979. He then signed as a professional in July 1984. He remained at The Dell until the spring of 1987, without breaking into the first team, although he made over 120 appearances for the reserves. In February 1987, he went on loan to Brighton and Hove Albion, with the deal being made permanent the following month with Brighton paying £10000 for his signature.

After a two seasons at Brighton and helping them to promotion back to the then 2nd Division in November 1988 he transferred to Aldershot, where he was to remain for four seasons, making 175 senior appearances. Described as "a talented right back", Brown made his debut for Aldershot in a 1–0 victory over Sheffield United.

Brown then joined Woking in the Football Conference whom he helped win the FA Trophy in 1994 and 1995. In 1996–97, he formed a defensive partnership with Steve Foster which was described as "impeccable". In February 1997, Woking played Coventry City in the FA Cup with the first match at Highfield Road being drawn 1–1. In the replay at the Kingfield Stadium, an own goal by Steve Foster handed the match to Coventry. On 16 May 1997, Woking won the FA Trophy defeating Dagenham & Redbridge 1–0 in extra time.

Brown left Woking in March 1998, having achieved much success winning and captaining the team to three FA Trophy wins at Wembley, finishing runner-up twice in the Conference and playing for England 5 times before joining Yeovil Town with Steve Thompson for a fee of £7,500. In August 1998, Woking arranged a testimonial match for Brown against West Ham United. Brown remained at Huish Park until March 2000 when he was released by new manager David Webb. He returned to Woking, to help the club avoid relegation from the Football Conference.

== Later career ==
In 2007, Brown was appointed Director of Sport at St. Francis School in Pewsey, Wiltshire.

== Honours ==
Woking

- FA Trophy winners: 1994, 1995, 1997
