= Alf Wheeler (Australian footballer) =

Australian rules footballer

Personal information
- Full name: Alfred Arthur Wheeler
- Born: 26 August 1885; Prahran, Victoria
- Died: 23 May 1929 (aged 43); East Melbourne, Victoria
- Height: 177 cm (5 ft 10 in)
- Weight: 66 kg (146 lb)

Playing career^{1}
Years	Club	Games (Goals)
1907	Carlton	1 (0)
- ^{1} Playing statistics correct to the end of 1907.

Alfred Arthur Wheeler (26 August 1885 – 23 May 1929) was an Australian rules footballer who played for the Carlton Football Club in the Victorian Football League (VFL).
