= Sherfield English =

Village and parish in Hampshire, England

Coordinates: 50.99973°N 1.58566°W

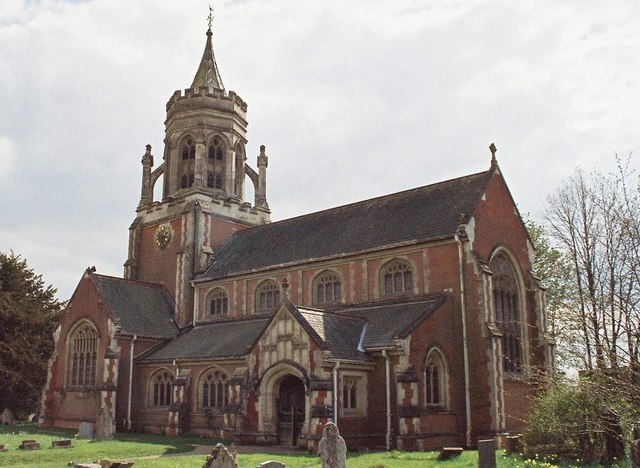
- St Leonard's Parish Church

- Location within Hampshire
- Population: 708 (2011 Census)
- OS grid reference: SU2843022544
- Civil parish: Sherfield English
- District: Test Valley
- Shire county: Hampshire
- Region: South East
- Country: England
- Sovereign state: United Kingdom
- Post town: ROMSEY
- Postcode district: SO51
- Dialling code: 01264/01794
- Police: Hampshire and Isle of Wight
- Fire: Hampshire and Isle of Wight
- Ambulance: South Central
- UK Parliament: Romsey and Southampton North

Sherfield English is a small village and civil parish in the Test Valley borough of Hampshire, England. It is located on the A27 road, around 4 miles (6.4 km) west of Romsey.

Sherfield English appears in Domesday Book of 1086 as the manor of Sirefelle, derived from the Anglo-Saxon scir feld, which probably means "bright open land". The suffix "English" probably comes from the L'Engleys family, who held the manor in the 14th century.

The parish church is dedicated to St Leonard. It was built in 1902 with funds given by Lady Ashburton, and is Grade II listed. The village also contains a village hall and a pub, The Hatchet Inn.

== Notable people ==
- Charles Barton DSO (1860–1919), first-class cricketer
