= Charles Barton (cricketer) =

English cricketer and British Army officer

Personal information
- Full name: Charles Gerard Barton
- Born: 26 April 1860; Sherfield English, Hampshire, England
- Died: 3 November 1919 (aged 59); Hatfield Peverel, Essex, England
- Batting: Right-handed
- Bowling: Slow left-arm orthodox

Domestic team information
- Years: Team
- 1893: Europeans
- 1895-1896: Hampshire

Career statistics
Competition	First-class
Matches	6
Runs scored	29
Batting average	4.83
100s/50s	–/–
Top score	22
Balls bowled	510
Wickets	9
Bowling average	22.88
5 wickets in innings	1
10 wickets in match	–
Best bowling	6/27
Catches/stumpings	–/–
- Source: ESPNcricinfo, 1 February 2010

Charles Gerard Barton DSO (26 April 1860 — 3 November 1919) was an English first-class cricketer and British Army officer. Barton served in the army from 1879 to 1905, seeing action in the Second Boer War, for which he was made a Companion of the Distinguished Service Order in 1901. As a cricketer, he played in both England and British India, making six appearances in first-class cricket.

== Military career and first-class cricket ==
The son of The Reverend Joseph Barton, he was born in April 1860 at Sherfield English, Hampshire. Barton was educated at Sherborne School. From there he was commissioned into the Royal Sussex Regiment as a second lieutenant in October 1879, but resigned his commission in March of the following year to attend the Royal Military College, Sandhurst. Barton graduated from there into the 46th Foot as second lieutenant in January 1881, and shortly thereafter he was transferred to the 75th Foot. Promotion to lieutenant followed in July 1881, which came prior to him being transferred to the King's Own Royal Regiment (Lancaster) in September 1881. A further promotion to captain followed in June 1889.

Barton's association with Hampshire County Cricket Club began in 1881, but he did not play first-class cricket for the club in the lead-up to its first-class status being rescinded in 1885. He continued to play second-class county cricket for Hampshire following the loss of its first-class status, most notably leading the county's bowling averages in 1891 with 42 wickets at an average of 9.79; in a match against the Marylebone Cricket Club in 1891 at Southampton, he took match figures of 14 for 67. However, it was to be while serving in British India that Barton made his debut in first-class cricket for the Europeans cricket team in the 1893 Bombay Presidency Matches, playing twice against the Parsees. In 1894, Hampshire regained their first-class status. Returning to England, Barton made four first-class appearances for Hampshire, playing three times in the 1895 County Championship and once in the 1896 County Championship. Described by Wisden as a "useful all-round cricketer", he took 9 wickets with his slow left-arm orthodox bowling in six first-class matches at an average of 22.88; he took one five wicket haul, with figures of 6 for 27 for the Europeans.

With The King's Own, he served in the Second Boer War. During the war, he was promoted to major in January 1900 and was made a Companion of the Distinguished Service Order. Barton retired from active service in June 1905. He died from heart failure in November 1919 at Hatfield Peverel, Essex.
