= Thomas Onslow (cricketer) =

English cricketer

Personal information
- Full name: Thomas Frederick Onslow
- Born: 15 January 1821; Old Alresford, Hampshire, England
- Died: 15 July 1883 (aged 62); New Alresford, Hampshire, England
- Relatives: Thomas Cranley Onslow (father); Thomas Onslow (grandfather)

Domestic team information
- Years: Team
- 1848–1849: Hampshire

Career statistics
| Competition | First-class |
|---|---|
| Matches | 2 |
| Runs scored | 13 |
| Batting average | 3.25 |
| 100s/50s | 0/0 |
| Top score | 7 |
| Catches/stumpings | 3/– |
- Source: Cricinfo, 26 April 2010

Thomas Frederick Onslow (15 January 1821 – 15 July 1883) was an English first-class cricketer. Onslow was the son of British politician Thomas Cranley Onslow and the grandson of Thomas Onslow, 2nd Earl of Onslow who had played first-class cricket for Surrey and the Marylebone Cricket Club.

Onslow represented Hampshire, making his first-class debut in 1848 against an All England Eleven. Onslow played one further match for the county against the same opposition in 1849.

Onslow died at New Alresford, Hampshire, on 15 July 1883.
