= Edwin Leat =

English cricketer

Edwin John Leat (24 April 1885 – 8 June 1918) played first-class cricket for Somerset in two matches, one each in 1908 and 1910. He was born at Wellington, Somerset and died in the fighting of the First World War near Beaumont Hamel in France.

In his two first-class matches, Leat batted in the lower order and did not bowl. He scored just 18 runs in three innings, with a highest of 11 in the match against Kent in 1908. He played with some success as a middle-order batsman for Buckinghamshire in Minor Counties cricket between 1908 and 1911. It is not known whether he batted right- or left-handed, and he bowled a little for Buckinghamshire, but the bowling style is also unknown.

Leat was a second lieutenant in the Dorsetshire Regiment when he was killed in the fighting on the Somme in 1918; he is commemorated at the Pozières memorial. At the time of his death, his widowed mother was living in Ottery St Mary, Devon and he left a wife, Winifred Emily, who lived at an address in Slough, then in Buckinghamshire (now Berkshire).
