= Leat, Nebraska =

Unincorporated community in Nebraska, U.S.

Coordinates: 42°53′45″N 101°49′29″W

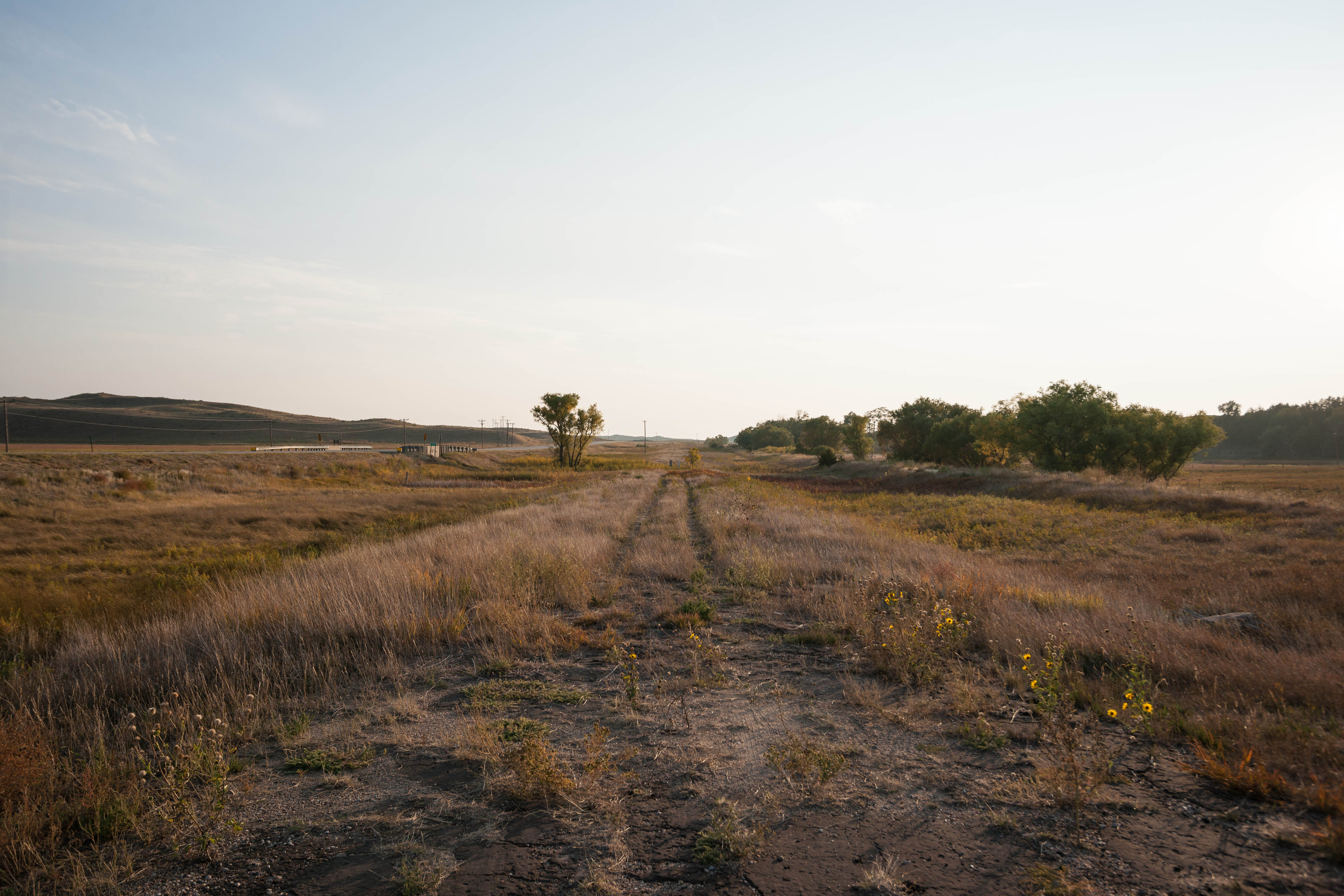
Leat, Nebraska

Leat is an unincorporated community in Cherry County, Nebraska, United States.

A post office was established at Leat in 1915, and remained in operation until it was discontinued in 1920.
