= John Flood (footballer, born 1932) =

English footballer (1932–2023)

Personal information
- Full name: John Ernest Flood
- Date of birth: 21 October 1932
- Place of birth: Southampton, England
- Date of death: 13 May 2023 (aged 90)
- Height: 5 ft 6 in (1.68 m)
- Position: Winger

Youth career
- Pennington St. Marks
- 1949–1952: Southampton

Senior career*
Years	Team	Apps	(Gls)
1952–1958	Southampton	122	(28)
1958–1959	Bournemouth	17	(3)
1959	Headington United	1	(0)
- Cowes
Total		139	(31)
- * Club domestic league appearances and goals

John Ernest Flood (21 October 1932 – 13 May 2023) was an English professional footballer who played as a winger.

== Early life ==
Flood was born in Southampton on 21 October 1932. He was one of eight brothers; his younger brother Raymond was a first-class cricketer.

== Career ==
Flood was capped as an England schoolboy international.

Flood joined Southampton from Pennington St. Marks in 1949 and played in the first team from 1952 to 1958, normally as a winger, making 129 appearances in all competitions and scoring 29 goals. His appearances coincided with Southampton's longest spell in Division 3. He later played 17 games in the Football League for Bournemouth, before joining Headington United, where he made 1 appearance in the Southern Football League in August 1959. He finished his career at Cowes.

== Death ==
Flood died on 13 May 2023, at the age of 90. At the time of his death, he was the oldest surviving former Southampton player.
