= Margaret Binley =

British silversmith

- Occupation: Silversmith

Margaret Binley or Bingley (née Stallwood) was an 18th-century English silversmith.

A specialist in the creation of wine labels, Binley is usually classified as a smallworker, although she is also listed as a bucklemaker, buttonmaker, and goldsmith. Resident in London, she registered her date mark on 15 May 1764, and continued active until the middle of the following decade.

In 1744 at London's All Hallows-on-the-Wall church, she married smallworker Richard Binley, from whom she was later widowed, and lived in Gutter Lane. No record of apprenticeship or freedom has been found.

Examples of Binley's work continue to turn up for sale. A Hermitage wine label, dated to around 1775, is owned by the National Museum of Women in the Arts in Washington, DC., in the United States.
