= Alfred Wheeler (cricketer) =

English cricketer

Alfred Wheeler (2 October 1845 – unknown) was an English first-class cricketer active 1872–73 who played for Surrey. He was born in Croydon; place of death unknown.
