= David Partner =

British portrait photographer (born 1956)

David M Partner (born 1956 in Winchester) is a British portrait photographer. His parents were academics with a lifelong attachment to Italy, where he first encountered classicism and renaissance art.

== Early life ==
Partner went to school in Winchester and then at Charterhouse School in Surrey, England. He first discovered photography at Winchester School of Art, taking portraits and photo documentary images. Partner's British influences included the early Victorian masters David Hill, Robert Adamson, and Julia Margaret Cameron. He was also influenced by 20th century American photographers such as Paul Strand, Edward Weston, Ansel Adams and the surrealist Man Ray; and by the Pre-Raphaelite Brotherhood of painters.

After art school, Partner moved to Paris, working as a photographers’ assistant, primarily with fashion and advertising photographers, learning to use mixed lighting techniques, as well as the business of photography. Partner worked on many major advertising campaigns including for Citroen, De Beers and G.H. Mumm. Partner also assisted on photographing portraits of Paris mayor Jacques Chirac, Spanish artist Salvador Dalí and Russian artist and designer Erté.

== Career ==
In the 1980s, Partner moved to London where his first published photograph was in the Sunday Times Magazine, and then also in The Observer, The Sunday Telegraph, The Daily Express and The Mail on Sunday on Sunday magazines. A feature on his work in the magazine Creative Review led to commissions from business magazines and design companies, where he worked on many of the top 100 plc's annual reports, developing a distinctive style of large format industrial photography.

In 2005, Partner initiated a series of 100-plus portrait photographs of all United Kingdom government ministers, with the intent of highlighting the normality of the lesser-known personalities in government. The “Heads of Government” series, now held in several national collections, was exhibited at the National Portrait Gallery in London during 2005/2006.

In 2006/2007, in recognition of his expertise and interest in the institutions that have developed over generations he was honoured to receive the first ever photographic commission from the British House of Commons entitled ‘Working for Parliament’. Following in the footsteps, he later discovered, of Victorian MP and photographer Sir John Benjamin Stone, this saw Partner photographing over 100 staff from all departments of the House of Commons at the Palace of Westminster. This was followed by an exhibition at Portcullis House, Westminster and a commemorative book.

Partner has also exhibited international work from Africa and the Middle East and has received commissions from the UK’s leading companies. In 2004, a commission for British car manufacturer Jaguar Land Rover, resulted in the company’s then head of Global Marketing, John Edwards, describe his work as: “some of the best photographs of our product we have seen."

Partner has been; a member director of the British Association of Photographers, and a trustee of Rook Lane Arts in Frome.
