= Charles Leat =

English cricketer

Personal information
- Full name: Charles William Leat
- Born: 6 December 1855; Ringwood, Hampshire, England
- Died: 18 December 1937 (aged 82); Christchurch, Hampshire, England
- Batting: Right-handed
- Bowling: Right-arm roundarm fast
- Role: Wicket-keeper

Domestic team information
- Years: Team
- 1878–1885: Hampshire

Career statistics
Competition	First-class
Matches	16
Runs scored	323
Batting average	11.53
100s/50s	–/1
Top score	63
Balls bowled	105
Wickets	2
Bowling average	24.50
5 wickets in innings	–
10 wickets in match	–
Best bowling	2/10
Catches/stumpings	21/1
- Source: Cricinfo, 20 January 2010

Charles William Leat (6 December 1855 — 18 December 1937) was an English first-class cricketer.

Leat was born in December 1855 at Ringwood, Hampshire. Playing primarily as a wicket-keeper, Leat made his debut in first-class cricket for Hampshire against the Marylebone Cricket Club at Lord's in 1878; he played first-class cricket until 1885, making sixteen appearances. In these, he scored 323 runs at an average of 11.53, with a single half-century score of 63. As a wicket-keeper, he took 21 catches and made a single stumping. Following the 1885 season, Hampshire lost their first-class status. Despite this, Leat continued to play second-class cricket for Hampshire until 1887. He died at Christchurch in December 1937.
