= Alf Wheeler (footballer, born 1922) =

English footballer

Personal information
- Full name: Alfred John Wheeler
- Date of birth: 6 April 1922
- Place of birth: Fareham, England
- Date of death: January 2013 (aged 90)
- Place of death: Lancashire, England
- Height: 5 ft 6 1/4 in (1.68 m)
- Position: Right winger

Senior career*
Years	Team	Apps	(Gls)
	Portsmouth	0	(0)
1947–1948	Blackburn Rovers	21	(5)
1949–1951	Swindon Town	23	(4)
- Weymouth
Total		44	(9)
- * Club domestic league appearances and goals as of 14:04, 18 April 2011 (UTC)

Alfred John Wheeler (6 April 1922 – January 2013) was an English footballer who played as a right winger in the Football League.
