= Sidney Pothecary =

English cricketer

Personal information
- Full name: Sidney George Pothecary
- Born: 26 September 1886; Southampton, Hampshire, England
- Died: 31 October 1976 (aged 90); Eastleigh, Hampshire, England
- Batting: Left-handed
- Bowling: Left-arm medium
- Relatives: Sam Pothecary (nephew)

Domestic team information
- Years: Team
- 1912–1920: Hampshire

Career statistics
Competition	First-class
Matches	12
Runs scored	103
Batting average	10.30
100s/50s	–/–
Top score	23*
Balls bowled	408
Wickets	4
Bowling average	64.25
5 wickets in innings	–
10 wickets in match	–
Best bowling	3/43
Catches/stumpings	5/–
- Source: Cricinfo, 30 January 2010

Sidney George Pothecary (26 September 1886 – 31 October 1976) was an English first-class cricketer.

Pothecary was born at Southampton in September 1886. He made his debut in first-class cricket for Hampshire against Gloucestershire at Southampton in the 1912 County Championship. Prior to the First World War, he made five appearances for Hampshire, and following the war, he made a further six. Notably during the 1919 season, he was incorrectly given out caught against Gloucestershire, when the ball lodged in his pads. In his twelve first-class appearances, he scored 103 runs at an average of 10.30, with a high score of 23 not out. With the ball, took four wickets, three of which (3 for 43) came against the Australian Imperial Forces in 1919. Pothecary died at Eastleigh in October 1976. His brother, Arthur, was a professional footballer, while his nephew, Sam Pothecary, was also a first-class cricketer.
