= William Clement (cricketer) =

English cricketer

Personal information
- Full name: William Thomas Clement
- Born: c. 1820; Chawton, Hampshire
- Died: January 1864; Anstey, Hampshire

Domestic team information
- Years: Team
- 1845: Hampshire

Career statistics
Competition	FC
Matches	1
Runs scored	5
Batting average	2.50
100s/50s	–/–
Top score	4
Balls bowled	–
Wickets	–
Bowling average	–
5 wickets in innings	–
10 wickets in match	–
Best bowling	–
Catches/stumpings	–/–
- Source: Cricinfo, 5 March 2010

William Thomas Clement (c. 1820 – January 1864) was an English cricketer.

Clement made a single first-class appearance for Hampshire against an All England Eleven in 1845. In his only first-class match Clement scored 5 runs.
