= Nick Buchanan (English cricketer) =

English cricketer and schoolteacher

Personal information
- Full name: Nicholas John Scouler Buchanan
- Born: 11 June 1989 (age 37); Basingstoke, Hampshire, England
- Height: 6 ft 4 in (1.93 m)
- Batting: Right-handed
- Bowling: Right-arm fast-medium

Domestic team information
- Years: Team
- 2009: Oxford University

Career statistics
Competition	First-class
Matches	1
Runs scored	8
Batting average	8.00
100s/50s	–/–
Top score	7
Balls bowled	66
Wickets	1
Bowling average	39.00
5 wickets in innings	–
10 wickets in match	–
Best bowling	1/30
Catches/stumpings	–/–
- Source: Cricinfo, 26 December 2011

Nicholas John Scouler Buchanan (born 11 June 1989) is an English cricketer and schoolteacher. Buchanan is a right-handed batsman who bowls right-arm fast-medium. He was born at Basingstoke, Hampshire. He is now a teacher of history and politics at Dr Challoner's Grammar School, in Amersham, Buckinghamshire.

While studying for a degree in history at Hertford College, Oxford, Buchanan made a single first-class appearance for Oxford University against Cambridge University in the 2009 University Match at Fenner's. In this match, he was dismissed for 7 runs by Ruel Brathwaite in Oxford's first-innings total of 152, while in Cambridge's first-innings he took the wicket of Ananya Sen to finish with figures of 1/30 from ten overs, with Cambridge being dismissed for 339. He ended Oxford's second-innings of 226 not out on 1, while in Cambridge's second-innings he bowled just the one over as Cambridge won the match by 10 wickets.

After joining the staff of Dr Challoner's Grammar School in 2013, as a history teacher Nick Buchanan. Following the departure of Patrick Buckland on 18 December 2020, Buchanan was appointed the head of the History and Politics Department. The Headteacher, Mr Atkinson, upon appointing him to this position made the following statement on X (formerly known as Twitter): 'At DCGS, we are delighted to announce the promotion of Nicholas Buchanan to the role as head of the Politics and History department following the latest inter-departmental reshuffle. He is a fresh new face to the Politics and History, with a wide breadth of experience.'
