= Raymond Flood (cricketer) =

English cricketer

Personal information
- Full name: Raymond David Flood
- Born: 21 November 1935; Northam, Hampshire, England
- Died: 13 March 2014 (aged 78); Lyndhurst, Hampshire, England
- Batting: Right-handed
- Bowling: Right-arm off break

Domestic team information
- Years: Team
- 1956–1960: Hampshire

Career statistics
Competition	First-class
Matches	24
Runs scored	885
Batting average	23.28
100s/50s	1/5
Top score	138*
Balls bowled	12
Wickets	0
Bowling average	–
5 wickets in innings	–
10 wickets in match	–
Best bowling	–
Catches/stumpings	10/–
- Source: Cricinfo, 2 January 2009

Raymond David Flood (21 November 1935 – 13 March 2014) was an English first-class cricketer active in the late 1950s and beginning of the 1960s.

== Cricket career and life ==
Flood joined Hampshire in April 1956, signing alongside Bernard Harrison, Brian Robbins and Roy Stride. He made his first-class debut for Hampshire against Essex at the Portsmouth during the 1956 County Championship, one of two first-class matches he played that season. He did not feature for Hampshire in 1957, while in 1958 he played just once against Derbyshire. Flood made scarce first–team appearances, with the established presence of Roy Marshall, Jimmy Gray and Henry Horton limiting his appearances, in what was a strong Hampshire side for the time.

He made his breakthrough into the Hampshire first-team in 1959, making twenty first-class appearances in a season characterised by good weather and an early experiment with covered wickets. He scored 780 runs in 1959, averaging 25.16 and made his only first-class century, an unbeaten 138 against Sussex at Hove. With the emergence of Dennis Baldry and Danny Livingstone, and with Mike Barnard's move from The Football League to playing for Hampshire on a full-time basis, Flood's career did not survive much longer; he made one further appearance, in 1960 against Oxford University. After a serious knee injury, he was released by Hampshire prior to the 1961 season.

His batting strengths were described by John Arlott in 1959 Cricket Journal, with Arlott remarking "His strength lies in two strokes... a truly bucolic swing to, or over, mid-wicket and the archaic square-cut off the front foot”. Following his retirement from first-class cricket, Flood lived in the New Forest, working as a window cleaner and playing club cricket for Lyndhurst for thirty seasons. He was diagnosed with liver cancer in 2013 and died six months later on 13 March 2014 in Lyndhurst. His brother, John, was a footballer who played 129 matches for Southampton.
