= John Bulbeck =

English cricketer

Personal information
- Full name: John Bulbeck
- Born: Unknown; Havant, Hampshire, England
- Died: 1888; Havant, Hampshire, England
- Batting: Unknown

Domestic team information
- Years: Team
- 1842: Hampshire

Career statistics
Competition	First-class
Matches	1
Runs scored	0
Batting average	0.00
100s/50s	–/–
Top score	0
Balls bowled	–
Wickets	–
Bowling average	–
5 wickets in innings	–
10 wickets in match	–
Best bowling	–
Catches/stumpings	–/–
- Source: Cricinfo, 16 February 2010

John Bulbeck (christened 30 December 1818 – 1888) was an English cricketer. Bulbeck's batting style is unknown.

Likely born at Havant, Hampshire, Bulbeck made a single first-class appearance for Hampshire against England in 1842 at Day's Ground, Southampton. In a match which England won by an innings and 5 runs, Bulbeck batted twice opening the innings, being dismissed for a duck in each innings by William Hillyer.

He died at the town of his birth sometime in 1888.
