= Iain Landles =

English playwright

Iain Joseph Robert Landles is an English playwright and novelist. His plays are mainly avant garde and experimental in nature, and his work has been seen on the London fringe, Edinburgh, the Brighton Festival, and on numerous tours across the UK. Landles created the successful Captain Garforth Mysteries series in which his main protagonist, Rider Garforth, is a shell-shocked veteran of the First World War. The series is set in the 1920s.

== Biography ==
Landles was born in Portsmouth, England, the eldest son of John and Pauline Landles. His early childhood was spent between England and Malta and his first language is Maltese. Landles obtained a First at Portsmouth University, where he also gained an MA in Literature, and received his Doctorate at Sussex University. He has been writing plays since 1988 and his first show (Urak-Hai) took place in 1992. Since then his work has appeared on the London Fringe, the Edinburgh and Brighton Festivals, and on numerous tours across Britain.

Landles' War Trilogy was performed between 2003 and 2005 at the White Bear Theatre, London. Time Out said of The Siege: "Landles' fierce poetic style, together with his themes of political and sexual depravity, might make you think of Howard Barker, and you'd not be far wrong. ... Landles has served up an intriguingly nasty piece of work." Landles is a controversial playwright, experimenting with theatrical form (see Seventh Day Respite, 2007, and Accelerating Expansion, 2008), language, character, and narrative. His confrontational style of writing has made him few friends in the theatrical world, and his unique voice is known for its lack of compromise. Seventh Day Respite received its premiere on 6 September 2011, at the White Bear Theatre, London.

Landles began writing the Captain Garforth Mysteries in 2015 and has produced two books, Cabin Fever and Death on Broadway. The novels follow the investigations of Captain Rider (Reggie) Garforth and Sergeant Martins across the world. the first book takes place on the Imperator cruise ship in the Atlantic, whilst Death on Broadway takes place in New York City. A third book in the series is underway.

Landles gained a Doctorate from the University of Sussex and has published extensively on the poet E.E. Cummings, for example, The Case for Cummings and is also a Contributing and Consulting editor for SPRING, The Journal of the E. E. Cummings Society. He finished his first novel KK: A Death in January 2009, and has completed 1920: Variations on a Theme of Masculinity which was published by Black Opal Books in August, 2017. In February, 2025, Cabin Fever and Death on Broadway; were published by Holand press. These novels comprise the first two novels in the Captain Rider Garforth Mystery series. He is currently working on the third novel of the series. Landles is also working on a new play set in Stalingrad, 1942.

== Personal life ==
Iain Landles is married to Joanna and lives in Oxford, England.

== Selected Plays ==
- Folk Singer (1989)
- Pictures at an Exhibition (1990)
- If Six Were Nine (1990)
- The Scottish Play (1991)
- A Message of Love (1991)
- Eve Hero, ID Ruler (1992)
- Urak-Hai (1992)
- Soach (1993)
- Kaliayev (1994)
- Lequesa (1995)
- Our Lady (1997)
- A Chamber Play (1998)
- The Park (1999)
- Sorry Seemed (2000)
- The Philosophy of Roses (2001)
- Roisin Dubh (2002)
- The Siege (2003)
- Angel of Mons (2004)
- Berezina (2005)
- Fortuna: Scenes of the Martyrdom of St. Osyth (2006)
- Aftermath (2006)
- Seventh Day Respite (2007)
- Accelerating Expansion (2008)
- Eyam Days (2008)
- Ophelia: Off Text (2008)
- Di: The Flatmate (2009)
- Sensuous Mechanism (2010)
- Deus Vult (2011)
- An Actor's Pain (2012)
- Ouroboros (2013)
- Picasso's Palette (2014)
- Zerzura (2015)
- Dismemberment (2016)
- Black Metal Trilogy (2020)
- Stalingrad (2026)

== Novels ==
- K K: A Death (2009)
- 1920: Variations of a Theme of Masculinity (2017)
- Cabin Fever (2025)
- Death on Broadway (2025)
