= Sam Pothecary =

English cricketer

Personal information
- Full name: Arthur Ernest Pothecary
- Born: 1 March 1906; Southampton, Hampshire, England
- Died: 21 May 1991 (aged 85); Iver, Buckinghamshire, England
- Batting: Left-handed
- Bowling: Slow left-arm orthodox
- Relatives: Sidney Pothecary (uncle)

Domestic team information
- Years: Team
- 1927–1946: Hampshire

Umpiring information
- FC umpired: 254 (1949–1958)

Career statistics
Competition	First-class
Matches	271
Runs scored	9,447
Batting average	23.34
100s/50s	9/47
Top score	130
Balls bowled	3,107
Wickets	52
Bowling average	41.15
5 wickets in innings	–
10 wickets in match	–
Best bowling	4/47
Catches/stumpings	147/–
- Source: Cricinfo, 20 February 2010

Arthur Ernest "Sam" Pothecary (1 March 1906 – 21 May 1991) was an English first-class cricketer who made 271 appearances in first-class cricket for Hampshire between 1927 and 1946, scoring over 9,000 runs. He later stood as an umpire in first-class cricket between 1949 and 1958.

== Cricket career ==
=== Playing career ===
The son of the Southampton footballer Arthur Pothecary senior, he was born in Southampton in March 1906. Towards the end of the 1920s, Hampshire were looking to bring in replacements for the ageing Phil Mead, George Brown, Jack Newman and Alec Kennedy. with Pothecary being one such player bought into the Hampshire team. He made his debut in first-class cricket for Hampshire against Surrey at The Oval in the 1927 County Championship. He impressed on debut, scoring 24 runs batting at number eleven, while also taking four wickets in Surrey's second innings, including those of Jack Hobbs and Andy Sandham. Pothecary made ten appearances during his debut season. He made just three first-class appearances in 1928, before making ten in 1929. He struggled for a regular place in the Hampshire eleven early in his career, but began to play more regularly for Hampshire from 1930. He scored 419 runs at an average of 16.76 from nineteen matches in 1930, and 372 runs at an average of 13.77 from twenty matches in 1931.

Beginning in 1932, his consistency with the bat began to improve. His batting average passed 20 for the first time that season, with Pothecary scoring 841 runs from 23 matches. The following season, he passed a thousand runs in a season for the first time, scoring 1,216 runs from 27 matches at an average of 27.02; it was during this season that he recorded his first two centuries, with scores of 101 against Surrey, which helped Hampshire avoid defeat, and 118 against Nottinghamshire. The following season he narrowly missed out on scoring a thousand runs in consecutive seasons, before seeing his average drop below 20 during the 1935 season. Pothecary enjoyed his most successful seasons between 1936 and 1938. During that period, he passed a thousand runs for the season in three consecutive seasons, making seven centuries during that period. Batting at number nine, he made an unbeaten 100 against Northamptonshire at Portsmouth in 1936, with Pothecary having come to crease when Hampshire were 103 for 7; his partnership of 125 for the eighth wicket with Stuart Boyes helped Hampshire recover to 260 all out. In 1937, he made his career-highest first-class score of 130 against the touring New Zealanders at Bournemouth.

After making 21 appearances in 1939 and scoring 753 runs, the Second World War bought about the cancellation of first-class cricket following the outbreak of the war in September. Pothcary served in the war as a corporal, where he played services cricket in Egypt. In also in played exhibition matches for the London Counties cricket team during the war. Pothecary returned to play for Hampshire following the end of the war, making three appearances in the 1946 County Championship. In total, he made 271 first-class appearances for Hampshire. In these, he scored 9,477 runs at an average of 23.34, making nine centuries and 47 half centuries. With his part-time slow left-arm orthodox bowling, which had shown promise early in his career, he took 52 wickets at a bowling average of 41.15, with best figures of 4 for 47. He often fielded at cover-point, taking 46 catches during his career.

=== Umpiring career ===
Following his retirement, he was appointed groundsman and cricket coach at Millfield School in Somerset in October 1946. He was appointed to the first-class umpires list ahead of the 1949 season, with Pothecary standing in his first match in the 1949 County Championship fixture between Middlesex and Northamptonshire at Lord's. He stood in 254 first-class matches until 1958, with Pothecary leaving the list in April 1959 in order to take up other employment.

== Later life and death ==
After stepping down from the first-class umpires list, Pothecary began an 18-year spell as head groundsman of the Royal Air Force Sports Ground in Uxbridge. He combined this with his coaching at the Chiswick Indoor Cricket School during the 1960s. In 1989, he had a leg amputated, with Pothecary later dying in May 1991 at a nursing home in Iver, Buckinghamshire. His uncle, Sidney Pothecary, was also a first-class cricketer.
