= Binley, Hampshire =

Village in Hampshire, England

Coordinates: 51.2770°N 1.3976°W

Binley
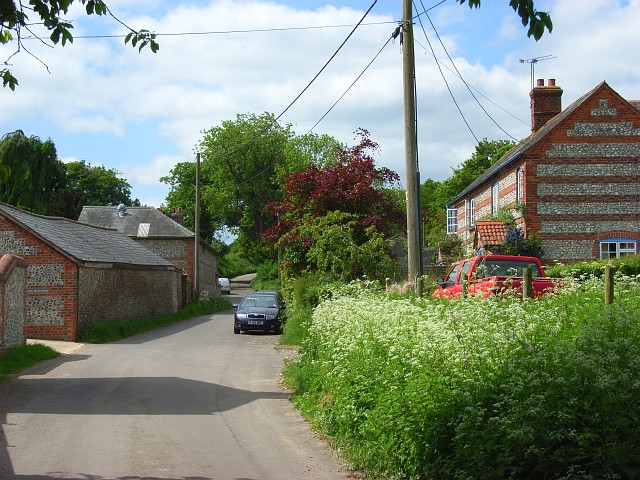
- Lane in Binley

- Location within Hampshire
- OS grid reference: SU4211553264
- Civil parish: St Mary Bourne
- District: Basingstoke and Deane
- Shire county: Hampshire
- Region: South East
- Country: England
- Sovereign state: United Kingdom
- Post town: WHITCHURCH
- Postcode district: SP11
- Dialling code: 01264
- Police: Hampshire and Isle of Wight
- Fire: Hampshire and Isle of Wight
- Ambulance: South Central
- UK Parliament: North West Hampshire

Binley is a village in Hampshire, England. The village lies near the A34 road between Whitchurch and Stockbridge. Its nearest town is Whitchurch, which lies approximately 4.4 miles (7.1 km) south-east from the village.

== Governance ==
The village is part of the civil parish of St. Mary Bourne and is part of the Burghclere, Highclere and St. Mary Bourne ward of Basingstoke and Deane borough council. The borough council is a Non-metropolitan district of Hampshire County Council.
