= Humphreys (surname) =

Humphreys is a common surname. Notable people with the surname include:

- Alan Humphreys (born 1939), English former professional footballer
- Alastair Humphreys, English cyclist, adventurer, author and motivational speaker
- Alf Humphreys (1953–2018), Canadian actor
- Andrew Humphreys (1821–1904), American politician
- Andrew A. Humphreys (1810–1883), American Army officer and Union general
- Anthony Humphreys (born 1971), Australian cricketer
- Arthur Humphreys (1917–2003), British former managing director of International Computers Limited (ICL)
- Ben Humphreys (1934–2019), Australian politician
- Benjamin G. Humphreys (1808–1882), American politician and Confederate Army general
- Benjamin G. Humphreys II (1865–1923), American politician
- Billy Humphreys, English footballer
- Bob Humphreys (disambiguation), multiple people
- Cecil Humphreys (1883–1947), British film actor
- Charles Humphreys (1714–1786), American miller, Continental Congressman from Pennsylvania
- Chris Humphreys, British novelist and actor
- Christine Humphreys, Welsh politician
- Christmas Humphreys (1901–1983), British High Court judge and founder of the London Buddhist Society
- Colin Humphreys (born 1941), British physicist and author (Biblical studies)
- Conrad Humphreys (born 1973), English professional sailor
- Corinne Humphreys (born 1991), English sprinter
- Curtis J. Humphreys (1898–1986), American physicist
- David Humphreys (disambiguation)
- Ed Humphreys (born 1953), Canadian retired professional ice hockey player
- Edward Humphreys (disambiguation)
- Eliza Humphreys (1850–1938), English novelist
- Emyr Humphreys (1919–2020), Welsh novelist
- Francis Humphreys (died 1961), Irish politician
- Frederick Humphreys (disambiguation)
- George Humphreys (cricketer) (1845–1894), English cricketer
- George Humphreys (civil engineer) (1863–1945), British civil engineer
- George Humphreys (rugby union) (1870–1933), English-born New Zealand rugby union player
- Gerry Humphreys (1931–2006), Welsh sound engineer
- Gordon Noel Humphreys (1883–1966), British surveyor, pilot, botanist, explorer and doctor
- Heather Humphreys (born 1960), Irish politician
- Helen Humphreys (born 1961), Canadian author
- Henry Noel Humphreys (1810–1879), British illustrator, naturalist, entomologist, and numismatist
- Humphrey Humphreys (1648–1712), Welsh bishop
- Justin Humphreys, American film historian
- Ian Humphreys (born 1982), Northern Irish rugby player
- Ian Humphreys (poet) (living), British poet
- James Humphreys (disambiguation)
- Jennett Humphreys (1829/30–1917), English author and poet
- Jessica Dee Humphreys (born 1970), Canadian writer
- Jere T. Humphreys (born 1949), American music scholar
- Jimmy Humphreys (1894–1956), Irish hurler
- John Humphreys (disambiguation)
- Jonathan Humphreys (born 1969), Welsh rugby player
- Josephine Humphreys (born 1945), American novelist
- Joshua Humphreys (1751–1838), American ship builder
- Kalita Humphreys (1915/1916–1954), American actress
- Kathryn Humphreys (born 1970), Canadian sports commentator
- Kevin Humphreys (disambiguation), multiple people
- Kirk Humphreys (born 1950), American politician
- Laud Humphreys (1930–1988), American sociologist
- Lloyd Humphreys (1913–2003), American psychologist
- London Humphreys (born 2005), American football player
- Margaret Humphreys (born 1944), English social worker, author and whistleblower
- Neil Humphreys (born 1974), British humour columnist
- Marika Humphreys (born 1977), British ice dancer
- Michael Humphreys (MP) (died 1626), English politician
- Mike Humphreys (born 1967), American baseball player
- Murray Humphreys (1899–1965), American criminal
- Sir Myles Humphreys (died 1998), Northern Irish politician and activist
- Nigel Humphreys (born 1951), British actor
- Noel Forbes Humphreys (1890–1918), Welsh rugby union international
- Onslow Humphreys (born c.1893), Australian rugby union player
- Parry Wayne Humphreys (1778–1839), American politician
- Paul Humphreys (born 1960), British musician
- Percy Humphreys (1880–1959), English international footballer
- Peter Humphreys, Papua New Guinea politician
- Phebe Westcott Humphreys (1864–1939) American horticulturist and author
- Punter Humphreys (1881–1949), English cricketer
- Reg Humphreys (1888–1967), English footballer
- Richard Humphreys (disambiguation)
- Ritchie Humphreys (born 1977), English footballer
- Robert Humphreys (disambiguation)
- Robin Humphreys (1907–1999), founder of Latin American studies in the United Kingdom
- Sir Salusbury Pryce Humphreys (1778–1845), British naval officer
- Samuel Humphreys (1778–1846), American naval engineer
- Sarah C. Humphreys, Classical scholar
- Sarah Gibson Humphreys (1830–1907), American author, suffragist
- Sheila Humphreys (1899–1994), Irish political activist
- Thomas Humphreys (disambiguation), multiple people
- Tog Humphreys (born 1968), English former cricketer
- Walter Humphreys senior (1849–1924), English cricketer
- Walter Humphreys junior (1878–1960), English cricketer
- Warren Humphreys (born 1952), English professional golfer
- West Hughes Humphreys (1806–1882), American and Confederate Judge, prohibitionist
- William Humphreys (disambiguation), multiple people

== See also ==
- Humfrey, given name and surname
- Humphery, surname
- Humphrey, given name and surname
- Humphry, surname
- Humphries, surname
- Humphrys, surname
