= 1890 County Championship =

British cricket tournament

- Cricket format: First-class cricket (3 days)
- Tournament format: League system
- Champions: Surrey (1st title)
- Participants: 8
- Matches: 54
- Most runs: Arthur Shrewsbury (1,082 for Nottinghamshire)
- Most wickets: George Lohmann (113 for Surrey)

The 1890 County Championship was the first County Championship held as an official competition, following agreement between Marylebone Cricket Club (MCC) and the leading county clubs at a meeting in December 1889. Surrey became the first official county champions after winning nine out of fourteen games.

== Constitution of the official championship ==
The official County Championship was constituted in a meeting at Lord's on 10 December 1889 which was called to enable club secretaries to determine the 1890 fixtures. While this was going on, representatives of the eight leading county clubs held a private meeting to discuss the method by which the County Championship should in future be decided. A majority were in favour of "ignoring drawn games altogether and settling the championship by wins and losses." Under this system defeats were subtracted from victories and the county with the highest total were champions. The new competition, which had official sanction, began in the 1890 season and initially featured Gloucestershire, Kent, Lancashire, Middlesex, Nottinghamshire, Surrey, Sussex and Yorkshire.

== 1890 County Championship ==
The 1890 County Championship was the first officially organised edition. It ran from 12 May to 28 August. Surrey, who had been unofficially proclaimed "Champion County" by sections of the press after the previous season, became the first official champions by winning nine of their fourteen matches.

== Fixtures ==
=== May ===
12–14 May 1890	Gloucestershire (H)	v	Yorkshire	Yorkshire won by 8 Wickets
Scorecard	194 (123.2 Overs); James Cranston 101; Ted Wainwright 4/37 (21 Overs)		330 (151.4 Overs); George Ulyett 107; Edward Grace 3/59 (24.4 Overs)	County Ground, Bristol; Umpires: Edward Henty and Frank Silcock
Scorecard	178 (86.2 Overs); Octavius Radcliffe 61; Robert Peel 4/76 (37 Overs)		43/2 (18.3 Overs); Robert Frank 21; Octavius Radcliffe 1/4 (3 Overs)	County Ground, Bristol; Umpires: Edward Henty and Frank Silcock
Gloucestershire won the toss and elected to bat.; Points: Gloucestershire -1, Yorkshire 1.

15–17 May 1890	Middlesex (H)	v	Kent	Kent won by 39 runs
Scorecard	98 (102.2 Overs); Charles Fox 33; George Burton 7/46 (50.2 Overs)		148 (70.2 Overs); Andrew Stoddart 59; Walter Wright 5/53 (25.2 Overs)	Lord's, London; Umpires: James Chatterton and Henry Holmes
Scorecard	183 (106.2 Overs); Francis Marchant 56; George Burton 5/62 (38.2 Overs)		94 (77.3 Overs); Alexander Webbe 21; Stanley Scott 21; Walter Wright 8/53 (39 Overs)	Lord's, London; Umpires: James Chatterton and Henry Holmes
Middlesex won the toss and elected to field.; Points: Middlesex -1, Kent 1

15–17 May	Nottinghamshire (H)	v	Sussex	Nottinghamshire won by an Innings and 266 runs
Scorecard	590 (284.4 Overs); Arthur Shrewsbury 267; Walter Humphreys 4/72 (31 Overs)		186 (106.4 Overs); George Bean 50; Francis Shacklock 6/87 (35.4 Overs)	Trent Bridge, Nottingham; Umpires: Richard Humphrey and Frank Silcock
Scorecard			138 (97.4 Overs) (f/o); Jesse Hide 44; William Barnes 6/59 (28.4 Overs)	Trent Bridge, Nottingham; Umpires: Richard Humphrey and Frank Silcock
Nottinghamshire won the toss and elected to bat.; Points: Nottinghamshire 1, Sussex -1

== Final table ==
One point was awarded for a win, and one point was taken away for each loss, therefore:

- 1 for a win
- 0 for a draw
- -1 for a loss

Team	Pld	W	T	L	D	Pts
Surrey	14	9	0	3	2	6
Lancashire	14	7	0	3	4	4
Kent	14	6	0	3	5	3
Yorkshire	14	6	0	3	5	3
Nottinghamshire	14	5	0	5	4	0
Gloucestershire	14	5	0	6	3	–1
Middlesex	12	3	0	8	1	–5
Sussex	12	1	0	11	0	–10

=== Statistical summary ===
Most runs
Aggregate	Average	Player	County
1,082	49.18	Arthur Shrewsbury	Nottinghamshire
832	36.17	W. G. Grace	Gloucestershire
798	34.69	James Cranston	Gloucestershire
704	39.11	Bobby Abel	Surrey
693	33.00	William Gunn	Nottinghamshire

Most wickets
Aggregate	Average	Player	County
113	12.66	George Lohmann	Surrey
102	12.08	John Sharpe	Surrey
90	12.90	Bobby Peel	Yorkshire
88	14.45	Frederick Martin	Kent
80	14.61	Arthur Mold	Lancashire

== Bibliography ==
- Lillywhite. James Lillywhite's Cricketers' Annual (Red Lilly) (1891 ed.). Lillywhite.
- Wisden. Pardon, Charles (ed.). Wisden Cricketers' Almanack, 28th edition (1891 ed.). London: John Wisden & Co. Ltd.
