= Humpherys =

Humpherys is a surname. Notable people with the surname include:

- David Humpherys (born 1972), American Magic: The Gathering player
- Douglas Humpherys, American pianist, educator, and adjudicator

== See also ==
- Humphery
- Humphreys (disambiguation)
- Humphries
- Humphrys
