= Jimmy Humphries =

Jimmy Humphries may refer to:

- Jimmy Humphreys (1894–1956), Irish hurler
- Jimmie Humphries (1889–1971), American professional baseball player, manager and executive

See also

- James Humphreys (disambiguation)
- Humphreys (surname)
- Humphries
