= Humphrey (disambiguation) =

Humphrey is a given name and a surname.

Humphrey may also refer to:

== Animals ==
- Humphrey (cat) (1988–2006), cat employed at 10 Downing Street, the British Prime Minister's residence
- Humphrey (chimpanzee), featured in several books and documentaries
- Humphrey the Whale, a humpback whale that deviated from its migration path and swam into San Francisco Bay and up the Sacramento River

== Places in the United States ==
- Humphrey, Arkansas, a city
- Humphrey, Idaho, an unincorporated community
- Humphrey, Nebraska, a city
- Humphrey, New York, a town
- Humphrey, West Virginia, an unincorporated community
- Humphrey Township, Platte County, Nebraska

== Other uses ==
- Humphrey Center, administration building at Grand View University in Des Moines, Iowa, United States
- Humphrey Coliseum, a multi-purpose arena in Starkville, Mississippi, United States
- Humphrey Go-Bart, a shuttle bus service that connected UC Berkeley with Berkeley BART station, United States
- Humphrey School of Public Affairs, University of Minnesota, Minneapolis, Minnesota, United States

== See also ==
- Humphreys (disambiguation)
- Humph (disambiguation)
