= Hunfrith =

Hunfrith is an Anglo-Saxon male given name, equivalent to modern English Humphrey. It may refer to:

- Hunfrith, bishop of Elmham
- Hunfrith of Winchester (died c. 752), bishop of Winchester

== See also ==
- Humfrid
- Hunferth
