= Frank Silcock =

Frank Silcock may refer to:

- Frank Silcock (footballer)
- Frank Silcock (cricketer)
