= Walter Humphreys =

Walter Humphreys may refer to:

- Walter Humphreys Sr. (1849–1924), English cricketer
- Walter Humphreys Jr. (1878–1960), English cricketer
