= Humphreys =

Humphreys may refer to:

== Places ==
- 10172 Humphreys, main belt asteroid

=== In the United States ===
- Benjamin G. Humphreys Bridge, Arkansas-Mississippi
- Camp Humphreys, U.S. Camp in South Korea
- Humphreys, Missouri
- Humphreys County, Mississippi
- Humphreys County, Tennessee
- Humphreys County Airport, Tennessee
- Humphreys County School District, Mississippi
- Humphreys National Forest, Virginia
- Humphreys Peak, the highest point in Arizona
- Humphreys Station, California
- Mount Humphreys, a peak in the Sierra Nevada

== Other uses ==
- Humphreys (surname)
- Humphreys College, Californian college
- Humphreys series, spectral line emissions of the hydrogen atom
- Humphreys (Unigate), characters featured in a 1970s advertising campaign for milk
- USS Humphreys (DD-236), U.S. destroyer
- USNS Joshua Humphreys (T-AO-188), U.S. oiler

== See also ==
- Humphries (surname)
- Humphrys (surname)
- Humphrey (disambiguation)
- Humph (disambiguation)
