= William Humphrey =

William Humphrey may refer to:

- William Humphrey (engraver) (1740–1810), English printseller
- William Humphrey (cricketer) (1843–1918), English cricketer
- William Humphrey (writer) (1924–1997), American novelist
- William Humphrey (Northern Ireland politician) (born 1967), Northern Irish unionist
- William E. Humphrey (1862–1934), American politician
- William F. Humphrey (1860–1928), Canadian politician in the Legislative Assembly of New Brunswick
- William J. Humphrey (1875–1942), film director
- Willie Humphrey (1900–1994), jazz clarinetist
- William Humfrey (died 1579), mining promoter, Assay Master at the Royal Mint

== See also ==
- William Humphreys (disambiguation)
