= John Humphrey =

John Humphrey may refer to:

- John Humphrey (Massachusetts colonist) (1597–1661), financial backer and settler of colonial Massachusetts
- John Humphrey (Illinois politician) (1838–1914), Illinois Representative and State Senator
- John Humphrey (bass player), bass player with Scott Henderson and Kirk Covington
- John Humphrey (drummer) (born 1970), percussionist
- John Humphrey (cricketer) (1837–?), English cricketer
- John Humphrey (footballer) (born 1961), English footballer
- John Peters Humphrey (1905–1995), Canadian legal scholar, jurist, and human rights advocate
- John A. Humphrey (1823–?), mill owner and political figure in New Brunswick, Canada
- John Francis Humphrey (1919–2012, American World War II pilot and skateboard designer.
- John H. Humphrey (1915–1987), British bacteriologist and immunologist
- John Humphrey House (disambiguation)
- John Humphrey, architect, designed Tabernacle Chapel, Morriston
- Jack Humphrey (1901–1967), painter
- Jack Humphrey (producer) (1932–1987), Canadian television producer and writer

== See also ==
- John Humphreys (disambiguation)
