= William Humphries =

William Humphries may refer to:

- William Stanley Humphries or Stan Humphries (born 1965), American football player

== See also ==
- William Humphreys (disambiguation)
