= Humphries =

Humphries is a surname, and may refer to:

- Barry Humphries (1934–2023), Australian comedian, creator of characters Dame Edna Everage and Sir Les Patterson
- Carla Humphries (born 1988), American-born Filipina actress and commercial model, also known as Carla Loren
- Charles Humphries, British countertenor
- Chris Humphries (1947–2009), British botanist
- David Humphries (1953–2020), English cricketer, brother of Mark Humphries
- D. J. Humphries (born 1993), American football player
- Edward "Ted" Humphries, Australian politician
- Gary Humphries (born 1958), Australian politician
- Gemma Humphries, British weather forecaster
- Gerald Humphries (1908–1983), English cricketer
- Henry Humphries (1879–1964), Canadian cricketer
- Isaac Humphries (born 1998), Australian basketball player
- Jay Humphries (born 1962), American basketball player
- Jimmie Humphries (1889–1971), American professional baseball player, manager and executive
- Joe Humphries (1876–1946), English cricketer
- John Humphries (disambiguation), several people
- Kaillie Humphries (born 1985), Canadian/American bobsledder
- Kris Humphries (born 1985), American basketball player
- Leonard Humphries (born 1970), American football player
- Les Humphries (1940–2007), English-born founder of the Les Humphries Singers
- Lex Humphries (1936–1994), American jazz drummer
- Luke Humphries (born 1995), English darts player
- Mark Humphries (born 1965), English cricketer, brother of David Humphries
- Ralph "Rusty" Humphries (born 1965), American radio presenter
- Sage Humphries (born 1998), American ballet dancer and model
- Shawn Paul Humphries (1971–2005), American murderer
- Stan Humphries (born 1965), American football player
- Tessa Humphries, Australian actress
- Tom Humphries, Irish former sports journalist and convicted child molester
- Tony Humphries (administrator), former administrator of the British Indian Ocean Territory
- Tony Humphries (musician) (born 1957), American DJ and producer

== See also ==
- Humfrey, given name and surname
- Humphery, surname
- Humphrey, given name and surname
- Humphreys (surname)
- Humphry, surname
- Humphrys, surname
