= Thomas Humphrey =

Thomas Humphrey may refer to:

- Thomas Humphrey (cricketer), English cricketer
- Tom Humphrey (artist) (1858–1922), Scottish-born Australian artist
- T. C. Humphrey (Thomas Chauncey Humphrey, 1846–1937), state legislator in Arkansas
- Thomas E. Humphrey (born 1945), chief justice of the Maine Superior Court
- Thomas M. Humphrey (born 1935), American economist
- Thomas Humphrey (MP) (c. 1554–1624), English politician
- Thomas Humphrey, a fictional character from the TV series Orange Is the New Black

== See also ==
- Thomas Humphreys (disambiguation)
