= Robert Humphreys =

Robert or Bob Humphreys may refer to:

- Robert Humphreys (politician) (1893–1977), U.S. senator from Kentucky
- Robert Humphreys (priest),19th-century Anglican priest in Ireland
- Robert Cunningham Humphreys (1905–1965), American Republican party operative
- Robert J. Humphreys (born 1950), judge of the Virginia Court of Appeals
- Robin Humphreys (Robert Arthur Humphreys, 1907–1999), British historian
- Laud Humphreys (Robert Allan Humphreys, 1930–1988), American sociologist and author
- Bob Humphreys (baseball) (born 1935), American baseball player
- Bob Humphreys (athlete) (1936–2022), American track and field athlete
- Bob Humphreys (speedway rider) (born 1946), Australian speedway rider

== See also ==
- Bob Humphries (1933–1988), English footballer
- Bob Humphrys (1952–2008), Welsh sports presenter
- Bobby Humphrey (born 1966), American football player
- Humphreys (surname)
