= Humph =

Humph or hmph may refer to:

== People and characters ==
- Humphrey, a masculine given name and surname, frequently nicknamed "Humph"
- Humphrey Lyttelton (1921–2008), English trumpeter and broadcaster, with the stagename "Humph"
- Humph, a fictional character from Tikki Tikki Tembo
- Humph, a fictional character from Jungle Beat: The Movie

== Arts, entertainment, media ==
=== Literature ===
- Hmph! (Japanese: フン!, romanized: Fun!), a manga by Hisaichi Ishii
- "Hmph!" (Japanese: プイ, romanized: Pui; chapter 47), a serialized chapter of the manga Demon Slayer; see List of Demon Slayer: Kimetsu no Yaiba chapters

=== Songs ===
- "Humph" (song), a 1947 tune by Thelonious Monk
- "Humph!" (song), a song on the 2019 EP Sum(me:r) by the Korean music group Pentagon
- "Hmph!" (Korean: 흥칫뿡, romanized: Heungchisppung), a 2020 song and single by WJSN: Cosmic Girls; see WJSN discography

== Other uses ==
- HMPH (gene and protein), an alternate name for HHEX, the hematopoietically-expressed homeobox protein
- Hyundai Motors Philippines (HMPH), a division of Hyundai Motor Company; see Automotive industry in the Philippines
- The Humph Trust, established by Humphrey Lyttelton to support young jazz artists

== See also ==
- "Humph! Humph! Humph!" (episode), a 2001 season 2 episode 2 number 32 of Between the Lions; see List of Between the Lions episodes
- Humphreys (disambiguation)
- Humphrey (disambiguation)
