= Thomas Humphries =

Thomas Humphries may refer to:

- Tom Humphries, Irish sports journalist
- Tom L. Humphries, American university professor

== See also ==
- Thomas Humphreys (disambiguation)
