= Richard Humphrey =

Richard Humphrey may refer to:

- Richard Humphrey (cricketer, born 1848) (1848–1906), English cricketer
- Richard Humphrey (cricketer, born 1936), English cricketer
- Richard Humphrey (priest), Dean of Hobart

== See also ==
- Richard Humphreys (disambiguation)
