= Humfrid =

Humfrid (also Humfred or Hunfrid) is a masculine given name of Germanic origin and the origin of the name Humphrey. It may refer to:

- Hunfrid of Prüm, bishop of Thérouanne
- Humfrid, Margrave of Gothia, also count of Barcelona
- Humfrid (archbishop of Magdeburg)
- Hunfrid, Margrave of Istria, Italian nobleman
- Hunfrid (archbishop of Ravenna)
- Humphrey of Hauteville, count of Apulia

== See also ==
- Hunfrith
- Hunferth
- Humphry, given name and surname
- Humfrey, given name and surname
