= Frederick Humphreys =

Frederick or Fred Humphreys may refer to:

- Frederick K. Humphreys (1816–1900), American physician; founder of Humphreys Homeopathic Medicine Company
- Frederick Humphreys (athlete) (1878–1954), British tug of war competitor and sport wrestler
- Frederic E. Humphreys (1883–1941), one of the original three military pilots trained by the Wright brothers
- Fred Humphreys (1907–1967), Australian government official, amateur photographer and botanist

== See also ==
- Frederick Humphries (disambiguation)
