= Humphrey =

Humphrey is both a masculine given name and a surname. Earlier forms of the name include Hunfrid and Hunfrith.

Notable people with the name include:

== People with the given name ==
=== Medieval period ===
Ordered chronologically

- Hunfrid of Prüm (Saint Humphrey, died 871), Benedictine bishop, abbot, saint
- Humphrey de Vieilles (died c. 1050), lord of Beaumont-le-Roger
- Humphrey of Hauteville (c. 1010–1057), Count of Apulia
- Humphrey de Bohun (disambiguation), various people who lived from the 11th to 14th centuries
- Humphrey of Toron (disambiguation), four 12th-century nobles
- Humphrey de Bassingbourne (fl. 1206), English justice
- Humphrey of Montfort (died 1284), nobleman of the Kingdom of Jerusalem
- Humphrey de Cherlton (fl. 1354–1357), Chancellor of the University of Oxford
- Humphrey Stafford (disambiguation), various English nobles
- Humphrey, 2nd Earl of Buckingham (1381–1399), English peer and member of the House of Lords
- Humphrey, Duke of Gloucester (1390–1447)

=== Modern era ===
- Humphrey Atkins (1922–1996), British politician and a member of the Conservative Party
- Humphrey Barclay (1941–), British television comedy producer.
- Humphrey Bate (1875–1936), American harmonica player and string band leader
- Humphrey Bland (1686–1763), British Army general
- Humphrey Bogart (1899–1957), American film actor
- Humphrey Bowman (1879–1965), British civil servant
- Sir Humphrey Burton (1931–2025), British television and radio presenter
- Humphrey Carpenter (1946–2005), English biographer, writer, and radio broadcaster
- Humphrey Cobb (1899–1944), American novelist and screenwriter
- Humphrey Critchley-Salmonson (1894–1956), cricketer
- Humphrey Crum-Ewing (1802–1887), English Liberal politician who sat in the House of Commons from 1857 to 1874
- Humphrey J. Desmond (1858–1932), American politician, writer, lawyer, and newspaper editor
- Humphrey Gilbert (1539–1583), English adventurer, explorer, member of parliament and soldier
- Humphrey Henchman (1592–1675), Church of England clergyman and bishop of London from 1663 to 1675
- Humphrey Jennings (1907–1950), English filmmaker and co-founder of Mass-Observation
- Humphrey Lyttelton (1921–2008), British jazz musician and host of I'm Sorry I Haven't a Clue
- Humphrey Mitchell (1894–1950), Canadian politician and trade unionist
- Humphrey Moseley (died 1661), prominent London publisher and bookseller in the middle seventeenth century
- Humphrey Mwanza (1949–2015), Zambian politician
- Humphrey Nyone, Zambian military officer
- Humphrey Owen (1702–1768), Principal of Jesus College, Oxford
- Humphrey Rudge (1977-), Dutch Footballer
- Humphrey Searle (1915–1982), English composer
- Humphrey Wells, former Governor of Georgia
- Humphrey Wingfield (died 1545), English lawyer, Speaker of the House of Commons of England between 1533 and 1536

== People with the surname ==
=== Arts and entertainment ===
- Bobbi Humphrey (born 1950), American jazz flautist and singer
- Doris Humphrey (1895–1958), dancer
- Earl Humphrey (1902–1971), American jazz trombonist, brother of Willie and Percy
- Jake Humphrey (born 1978), television presenter
- Madison Humphrey, American TikToker and journalist
- Maud Humphrey (1868–1940), American illustrator
- Nene Humphrey (born 1947), American artist
- Ozias Humphrey or Humphry (1742–1810), English painter
- Percy Humphrey (1905–1995), American jazz trumpeter, brother of Earl and Willie
- Renee Humphrey (born 1975), American actress
- Scott Humphrey, Canadian record producer and mix engineer
- Willie Humphrey (1900–1994), American jazz clarinetist, brother of Earl and Percy

=== Politics ===
- Charles Humphrey (1792–1850), American lawyer and politician
- Chester Humphrey (born 1951), Grenadian politician
- Friend Humphrey (1787–1854), New York politician
- Gordon J. Humphrey (born 1940), U.S. senator from New Hampshire
- Hubert Humphrey (1911–1978), Vice President of the United States
- Jasper Humphrey (1812–1892), American sailor and politician
- Lester H. Humphrey (1850–1902), New York state senator
- Muriel Humphrey (1912–1998), U.S. senator from Minnesota and wife of Hubert Humphrey
- Philander P. Humphrey (1823–1862), American politician and physician
- Skip Humphrey (Hubert H. Humphrey III, born 1942), son of Hubert H. Humphrey II
- William E. Humphrey (1862–1934), American politician
- Wolcott J. Humphrey (1817–1890), New York state senator

=== Sports ===
- Chris Humphrey (born 1987), footballer
- Claude Humphrey (1944–2021), American former football defensive lineman
- Creed Humphrey (born 1999), American football player
- John Humphrey (American football) (born 2002), American football player
- Julian Humphrey (born 2003), American football player
- Lil'Jordan Humphrey (born 1998), American football player
- Marlon Humphrey (born 1996), American football player
- Ryan Humphrey (born 1979), American basketball player
- Tasha Humphrey (born 1985), professional basketball player
- Terin Humphrey (born 1986), American gymnast
- Tory Humphrey (born 1983), American football player

=== Science and academics ===
- Heman Humphrey (1779–1861), President of Amherst College
- James Ellis Humphrey (1861–1897), American botanist and mycologist with the botanical author abbreviation Humphrey
- John H. Humphrey (1915–1987), bacteriologist and immunologist
- Nicholas Humphrey (born 1943), British psychologist
- Philip Strong Humphrey (1926–2009), American ornithologist
- Thomas M. Humphrey (1935–2023), American economist

=== Other fields ===
- Alexander Pope Humphrey (1848–1928), American lawyer, judge of chancery court
- Andrew Humphrey (1921–1977), Marshal of the Royal Air Force
- Edward Porter Humphrey (1809–1886), American Presbyterian minister, author, Presbyterian General Assembly moderator
- Edward William Cornelius Humphrey (1844–1917), American theological and legal scholar
- Hannah Humphrey (active 1745–1818), British publisher and print seller
- John Peters Humphrey (1905–1995), Canadian jurist
- Lewis Craig Humphrey (1875–1927), American newspaper editor
- Mary Vance Humphrey (1838-1916), American writer, clubwoman
- Mose Humphrey, American and member of Fire Company 40
- Watts Humphrey (1927–2010), American software engineer

== Fictional characters ==
- Sir Humphrey Appleby, on the BBC television show Yes Minister
- Sir Humphrey Pengallan, main antagonist of the film Jamaica Inn
- Sir Humphrey Pumphrey, antagonist in Rupert
- Dalton Humphrey, on The Red Green Show
- Dan Humphrey, Gossip Girl character
- Humphrey Chimpden Earwicker, in James Joyce's novel Finnegans Wake
- Humphrey B. Bear, an Australian children's TV character
- Humphrey the Bear, a Disney character
- Humphrey, a muppet on Sesame Street
- Jenny Humphrey, Gossip Girl character
- Rufus Humphrey, Gossip Girl character
- HUMPHREY, a character in the 2020 role-playing video game Omori
- Humphrey Goodman, a main character in the BBC TV series Death in Paradise and Beyond Paradise, portrayed by Kris Marshall

== See also ==
- Humfrey, given name and surname
- Humphery, surname
- Humphry, surname
- Humphreys (surname)
- Humphries, surname
- Humphrys, surname
