= James Humphrey =

James Humphrey may refer to:

- James Humphrey (New York politician) (1811–1866), U.S. Representative from New York
- James Brown Humphrey (1859–1937), musician, bandleader, and music instructor in New Orleans, Louisiana
- James K. Humphrey, founder of the United Sabbath-Day Adventist Church, a small African American Christian denomination
- James M. Humphrey (1819–1899), also a U.S. Representative from New York
- James Humphrey (convict) (1832–1898), Australian convict and schoolteacher
- James Ellis Humphrey (1861–1897), American botanist and mycologist
- James H. Humphrey (1911–2008), educator and leader in the field of physical education

== See also ==
- James Humphreys (disambiguation)
