= Thomas Shooter =

English cricketer

Personal information
- Full name: Thomas Shooter
- Born: 11 March 1845; Hucknall Torkard, Nottinghamshire, England
- Died: 4 July 1919 (aged 74); Hucknall Torkard, Nottinghamshire, England
- Batting: Right-handed
- Bowling: Right-arm fast
- Relatives: Walter Wright (nephew)

Domestic team information
- Years: Team
- 1881: Nottinghamshire

Career statistics
Competition	First-class
Matches	2
Runs scored	23
Batting average	7.66
100s/50s	–/–
Top score	15*
Balls bowled	132
Wickets	–
Bowling average	–
5 wickets in innings	–
10 wickets in match	–
Best bowling	–
Catches/stumpings	1/–
- Source: Cricinfo, 30 May 2012

Thomas Shooter (11 March 1845 – 4 July 1919) was an English cricketer. Shooter was a right-handed batsman who bowled right-arm fast. He was born at Hucknall Torkard, Nottinghamshire.

Shooter made two first-class appearances for Nottinghamshire in 1881, against Surrey at The Oval, and Sussex at the County Ground, Hove. In his first match, Surrey won the toss and elected to bat first, making 293 all out. Shooter bowled 22 overs during the innings, conceding 36 runs. In response, Nottinghamshire were dismissed for 109, with Shooter being dismissed for a duck by Ted Barratt. Forced to follow-on in their second-innings, Nottinghamshire were dismissed for 162, with Shooter once again dismissed by Barratt, this time for 5 runs. Surrey won the match by an innings and 22 runs. In his second match against Sussex, Nottinghamshire won the toss and elected to bat first, making 174 all out, with Shooter ending the innings not out on 15. Replying, Sussex made 210 all out, with Shooter bowling 11 wicketless overs for the cost of 21 runs. Nottinghamshire then made 172 all out in their second-innings, with Shooter scoring 3 runs before he was dismissed by James Lillywhite. Requiring 137 for victory, Sussex were dismissed for just 100, giving Nottinghamshire victory by 36 runs. Shooter did not bowl in their second-innings.

Outside of cricket he worked as a coal miner. He died at the town of his birth on 4 July 1919. His nephew, Walter Wright, also played first-class cricket.
