= Ethel McClellan Plummer =

American artist

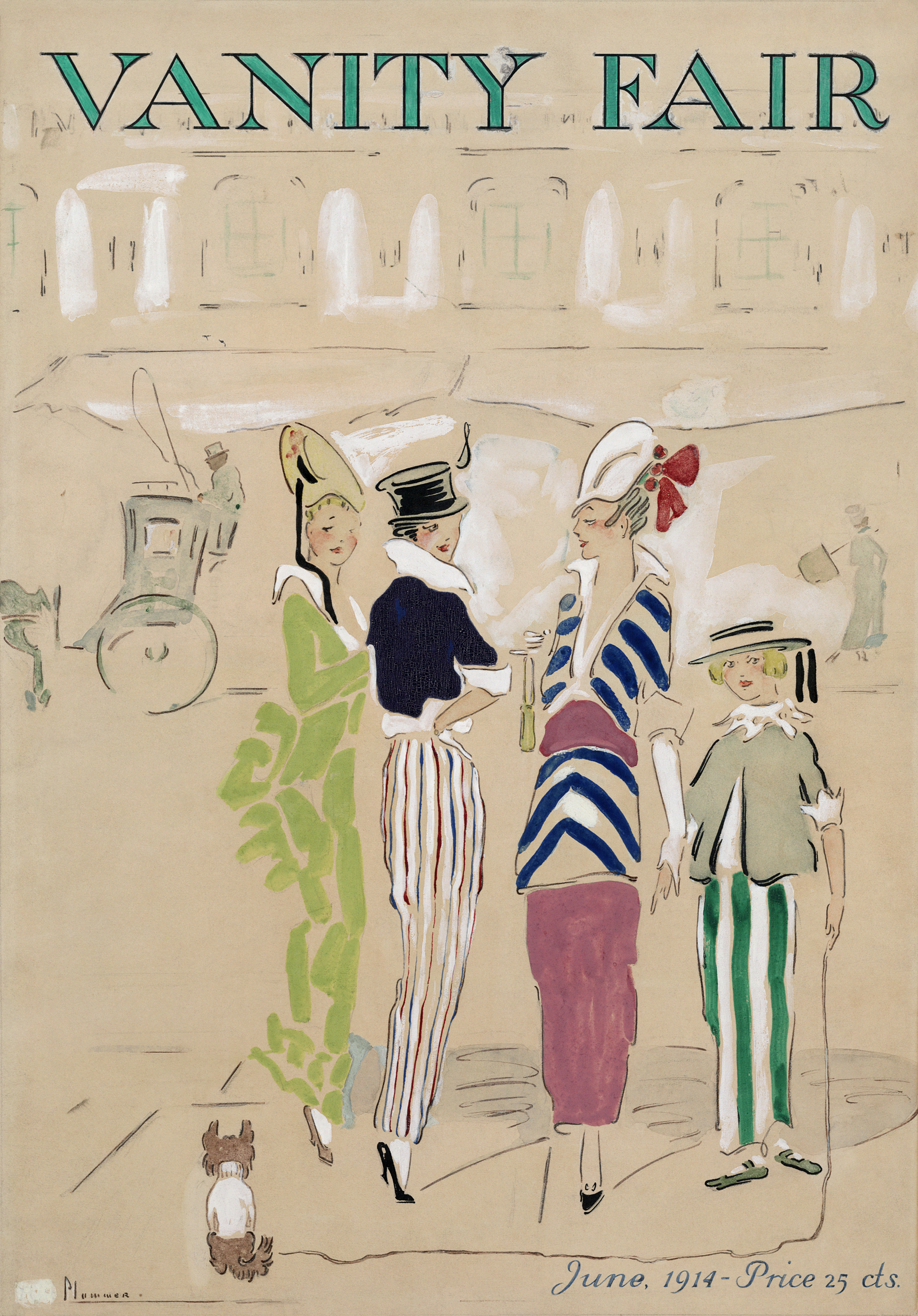
Cover art for Vanity Fair magazine, June 1914. Scanned from the artist's original sketch in India ink, gouache, and watercolor over pencil. Digitally restored.

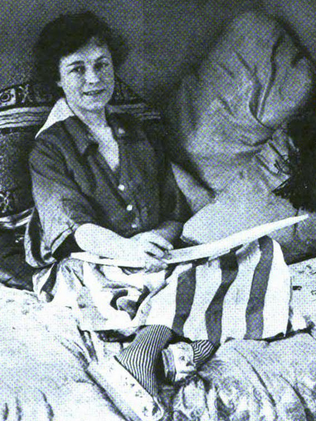
Ethel Plummer, from a 1916 publication.

Ethel McClellan Plummer (March 30, 1888 – October 30, 1936) was an American artist who resided primarily in New York. She worked primarily with drawings, prints, and paintings. She was the Vice President of the Society of Illustrators and Artists and exhibited at the Society of Independent Artists in 1910, the MacDowell Club in 1915, the Exhibition of Painting and Sculpture by Women Artists for the Benefit of Woman Suffrage Campaign at the Macbeth Gallery (1915). She worked as an illustrator for various magazines, including Life, Vogue, Shadowland, and Vanity Fair.

Plummer was born on March 30, 1888 in Brooklyn, New York City. She studied at the Packer Institute and the New York School of Art. On December 25, 1917, she married fellow artist Norman Jacobsen (1884–1944) in Hackensack, New Jersey. He was soon drafted into the American Expeditionary Forces and chose to pursue his art career in Europe after World War I. They divorced in late 1929 and Plummer married Frederic E. Humphreys. She died from a cerebral hemorrhage on October 30, 1936 in Manhattan and was interred at the Green-Wood Cemetery in Brooklyn on November 2.
