= Humphreys' Specifics =

Historic homeopathic brand

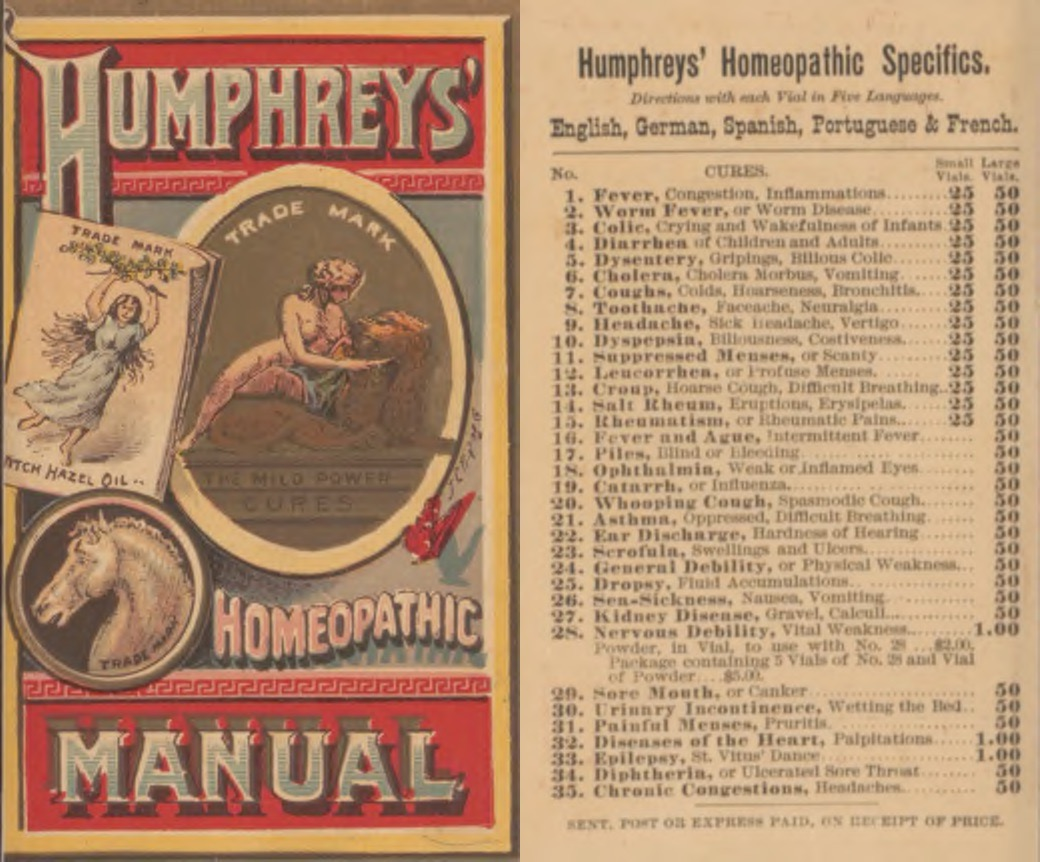
Humphreys' Homeopathic Specifics - 1884 manual (U.S. National Library of Medicine 101212220)

Humphreys' Specifics were a line of American-made homeopathic remedies. There were typically 35 products in the Humphreys Medical Company line. In 2022, researchers determined "sucrose and apigenin were identified as primary components in Humphreys' specifics through the utilization of MS/MS technique." An early 20th-century activist against quack medicine, Arthur J. Cramp, advised as much in a letters to consumers, writing "'If the patient's condition calls for No. 10 and that particular remedy is not at hand, I take it that two doses of No. 5 or one dose each of No. 7 and No. 3 would accomplish the same result,'" and "'If they are truly homeopathic remedies you can take the entire 77 varieties and eat them with the same impunity that you would eat the same amount of milk sugar'."

The pills were popular in the Midwestern United States. In addition to patent medicines for people Humphrey also sold veterinary treatments (Humphreys' Veterinary Specifics), witch-hazel oil, and "Marvel of Healing, a patent medicine taken internally and externally for bruises, corns, diarrhea, earache, neuralgia, rheumatism, shaving, sunburn, toothache, varicose veins, and vomiting". In 2015, an Antiques Roadshow host appraised a "nearly full" cabinet of Humphreys' Specifics as potentially worth $4,000 at auction.

Humphreys' Specifics may have been ironically named, as they "were the first combination remedies, as each contained several remedies. The idea was that one of them would surely work for the patient, making for a much simpler practice of homeopathy, or at least quasi-homeopathy". In addition to criticism of the product by the American Medical Association, the popular product line had its detractors within the homeopathic community.

== No. 11 ==
Humphreys No. 11 was an American-made homeopathic abortifacient. The recommended dosage in the early 20th century was two pills four times a day until "desired result". As of 1857, No. 11 "for suppressed or painful periods" cost 25¢ for a bottle. In 1884 the usage directions from the manual of Humphreys' Specifics were:

Tardy Menses.—When menstruation in young girls does not come on at the usual time, it is not wise to hasten to administer medicine to produce it. So long as the general health remains good, do nothing to promote this secretion, beyond attention to proper clothing, exercise and diet. The clothing should be warm, and changed to suit the temperature and season, and a wholesome, generous diet should be adopted, avoiding spices, coffee and high-seasoned food. This will generally be sufficient. Should, however, there be symptoms of its approach, such as flushes of heat, frequent giddiness of the head, heaviness in the abdomen and about the loins, six pellets of Specific No. Eleven, night and morning, will usually, in due time, produce the result.

== No. 31 ==
A container of Humphreys No. 31 "for painful menstruation," that was sold in the late 1930s, listed the following ingredients: black haw (Viburnum Prun.) 1X, .46%; belladonna 2X, .35%; platinum 8X, .35%; graphites 8X, .02%; sepia 8X, .02%.

== No. 77 ==
The most popular remedy in the 1930s, Humphreys' No. 77 was supposed to cure colds, the flu, and "catarrh".
