= Frederick Humphries =

Frederick or Fred Humphries may refer to:

- Frederick S. Humphries (1935–2021), American academic administrator and chemistry professor
- Frederick Ward Humphries II (born 1965/66), American FBI agent involved in the Petraeus scandal
- Fred Humphries, a character in the 1983 film Kentucky Woman

== See also ==
- Frederick Humphreys (disambiguation)
