= Karen O'Connor (judge) =

Irish judge

The Hon. Ms. Justice Karen O'Connor

Judge of the High Court
- Incumbent
- Assumed office 6 December 2021
- Nominated by: Government of Ireland
- Appointed by: Michael D. Higgins

Judge of the Circuit Court
- In office 27 November 2014 – 6 December 2021
- Nominated by: Government of Ireland
- Appointed by: Michael D. Higgins

Personal details
- Education: Trinity College Dublin; King's Inns

Karen O'Connor is an Irish judge and lawyer who has served as a Judge of the High Court since December 2021. She previously served as a Judge of the Circuit Court from 2014 to 2021. She previously practiced as a barrister specialising in criminal law.

== Early life ==
O'Connor was educated at Trinity College Dublin and the King's Inns.

== Legal career ==
She was called to the Bar in 1993. During her career as a barrister she frequently appeared in criminal trials, often prosecuting on behalf of the Director of Public Prosecutions. She acted in cases involving sexual offences, drug offences, theft, murder and assault.

== Judicial career ==
=== Circuit Court ===
O'Connor became a judge of the Circuit Court in November 2014. She presided over criminal trials in the Circuit Court. She was initially not assigned to a circuit and heard cases in Galway. She was assigned to the Dublin Circuit between 2017 and 2021.

O'Connor was the presiding judge in the criminal trials of Tom Humphries in 2017 and David Drumm in 2018. The Drumm trial lasted for 16 weeks.

=== High Court ===
The Irish government agreed to nominate her to become a judge of the High Court in November 2021. She was appointed on 6 December 2021.
