= 1893 County Championship =

English cricket tournament

- Cricket format: First-class cricket (3 days)
- Tournament format: League system
- Champions: Yorkshire (1st title)
- Participants: 9
- Matches: 72
- Most runs: William Gunn (1,223 for Nottinghamshire)
- Most wickets: J. T. Hearne (137 for Middlesex)

The 1893 County Championship was the fourth officially organised running of the County Championship, and ran from 11 May to 28 August 1893. Yorkshire County Cricket Club claimed their first title, ending Surrey's run of three consecutive titles.

== Table ==
- One point was awarded for a win, and one point was taken away for each loss.

Team	Pld	W	T	L	D	Pts
Yorkshire	16	12	0	3	1	9
Lancashire	16	9	0	5	2	4
Middlesex	16	9	0	6	1	3
Kent	16	6	0	4	6	2
Surrey	16	7	0	8	1	–1
Nottinghamshire	16	5	0	7	4	–2
Sussex	16	4	0	7	5	–3
Somerset	16	4	0	8	4	–4
Gloucestershire	16	3	0	11	2	–8

== Leading averages ==
Most runs
Aggregate	Average	Player	County
1,223	47.03	William Gunn	Nottinghamshire
1,178	47.12	Andrew Stoddart	Middlesex
1,035	38.33	Albert Ward	Lancashire
976	37.53	Arthur Shrewsbury	Nottinghamshire
965	35.74	Billy Murdoch	Sussex

Most wickets
Aggregate	Average	Player	County
137	16.04	J. T. Hearne	Middlesex
122	16.43	Walter Humphreys	Sussex
117	14.99	Arthur Mold	Lancashire
108	13.75	Johnny Briggs	Lancashire
99	14.34	Tom Richardson	Surrey
