= Thomas Humphreys =

Thomas Humphreys may refer to:

- Thomas Humphreys (athlete) (1890–1967), British athlete
- Thomas Basil Humphreys (1840–1890), English-born miner, auctioneer and political figure in British Columbia
- Thomas Humphreys (British Army officer) (1878–1955)
- Thomas Humphreys (Baptist minister) (died 1909), minister of Seion, Cwmaman
- T. H. Humphreys (1865–1951), American politician

== See also ==
- Thomas Humphries (disambiguation)
- Thomas Humphrey (disambiguation)
