= George Humphreys (cricketer) =

English cricketer

Personal information
- Full name: George Thomas Humphreys
- Born: 28 March 1845; Brighton, Sussex, England
- Died: 18 December 1894 (aged 49); Preston Park, Sussex, England
- Batting: Right-handed
- Role: Wicket-keeper
- Relatives: Walter Humphreys, Sr. (brother); Walter Humphreys, Jr. (nephew)

Domestic team information
- Years: Team
- 1869–1886: Sussex

Career statistics
Competition	First-class
Matches	32
Runs scored	545
Batting average	10.28
100s/50s	–/1
Top score	58
Balls bowled	–
Wickets	–
Bowling average	–
5 wickets in innings	–
10 wickets in match	–
Best bowling	–
Catches/stumpings	20/3
- Source: Cricinfo, 7 January 2012

George Thomas Humphreys (28 March 1845 – 18 December 1894) was an English cricketer. Humphreys was a right-handed batsman who fielded as a wicket-keeper. He was born at Brighton, Sussex.

Humphreys made his first-class debut for Sussex against Surrey at The Oval in 1869. He played infrequently for Sussex over the next seventeen years, making 31 further first-class appearances for the county, the last of which came against Surrey at the County Ground, Hove, in 1886. Described in his 1896 obituary in Wisden as a "fair bat", Humphreys scored a total of 545 runs in his 32 matches, which came at an average of 10.28. He passed fifty just once in his career, making 58 against Lancashire in 1869. In the field he took 20 catches and made 3 stumpings.

Outside of county cricket, he worked as the cricket coach at Brighton College from 1871 to 1872. In 1874 he was recorded as living at 177 Edward Street, Brighton, where he worked as a shoe maker. The 1881 census has him recorded living at 14 Preston Road, Brighton, still working as a shoe maker, though by this time widowed and with two young children. He was a Councillor for the Kemp Town ward of Brighton, a post he still held when he died suddenly at Preston Park, Sussex on 18 December 1894, from a broken blood vessel. His brother, Walter, was a famous lob bowler, while his son, also called Walter, played first-class cricket as well.
