= Thomas Humphrey (cricketer) =

English cricketer

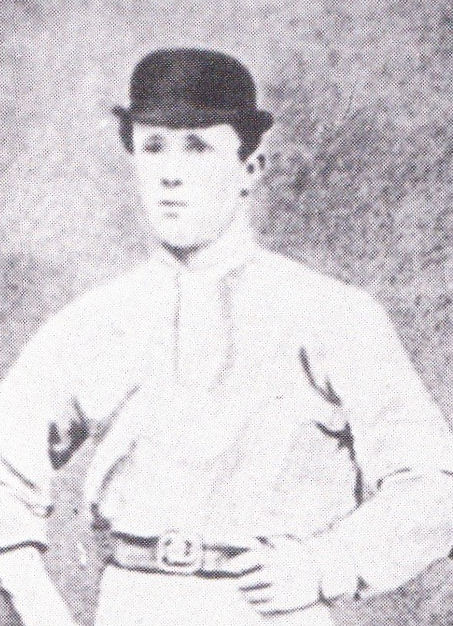
- Humphrey in 1865

Personal information
- Born: 16 January 1839; Mitcham, Surrey, England
- Died: 3 September 1878 (aged 39); Brookwood Hospital, Surrey, England
- Batting: Right-handed
- Bowling: Right-arm slow
- Role: All-rounder

Domestic team information
- Years: Team
- 1862-1874: Surrey
- FC debut: 12 June 1862 Surrey v Nottinghamshire
- Last FC: 28 May 1874 Surrey v Cambridge University

Career statistics
Competition	First-class
Matches	214
Runs scored	6,687
Batting average	18.42
100s/50s	4/31
Top score	144
Balls bowled	4,897
Wickets	116
Bowling average	21.58
5 wickets in innings	6
10 wickets in match	0
Best bowling	6/29
Catches/stumpings	95/–
- Source: CricketArchive, 6 June 2009

Thomas Humphrey (16 January 1839 – 3 September 1878) was an English cricketer who played first-class cricket for Surrey between 1862 and 1874.

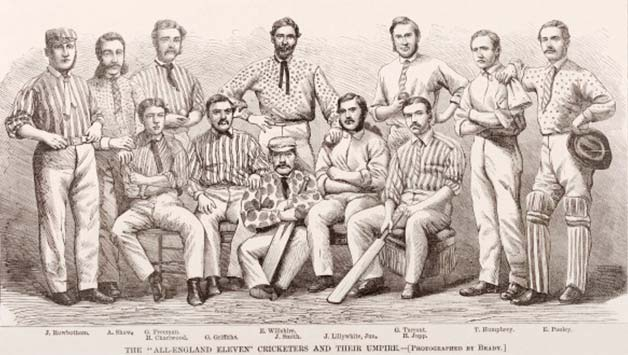
The England Cricket Team that toured North America 1868–9. Thomas Humphrey standing second from right

A right-hand batsman and a round arm right-armed slow bowler, he featured as an all-rounder for Surrey with four centuries and 116 wickets (though his batting was more significant than his bowling). He was a member of the Surrey side that was generally reckoned as Champion County for 1864. His best season with the bat was 1865, when he reached one thousand runs for the only time: 1223 at 29.82.

After 1873, he played in only four more first-class matches: one final match for Surrey in 1874, two for the South against the North in 1875, and lastly for United South of England Eleven v United North of England Eleven in a match that began on 13 July 1876.

According to David Lemmon, with Harry Jupp he formed the first great opening partnership for Surrey, one which caused "a sensation" with "their bright and attractive cricket, their long partnerships, by their speed between the wickets."

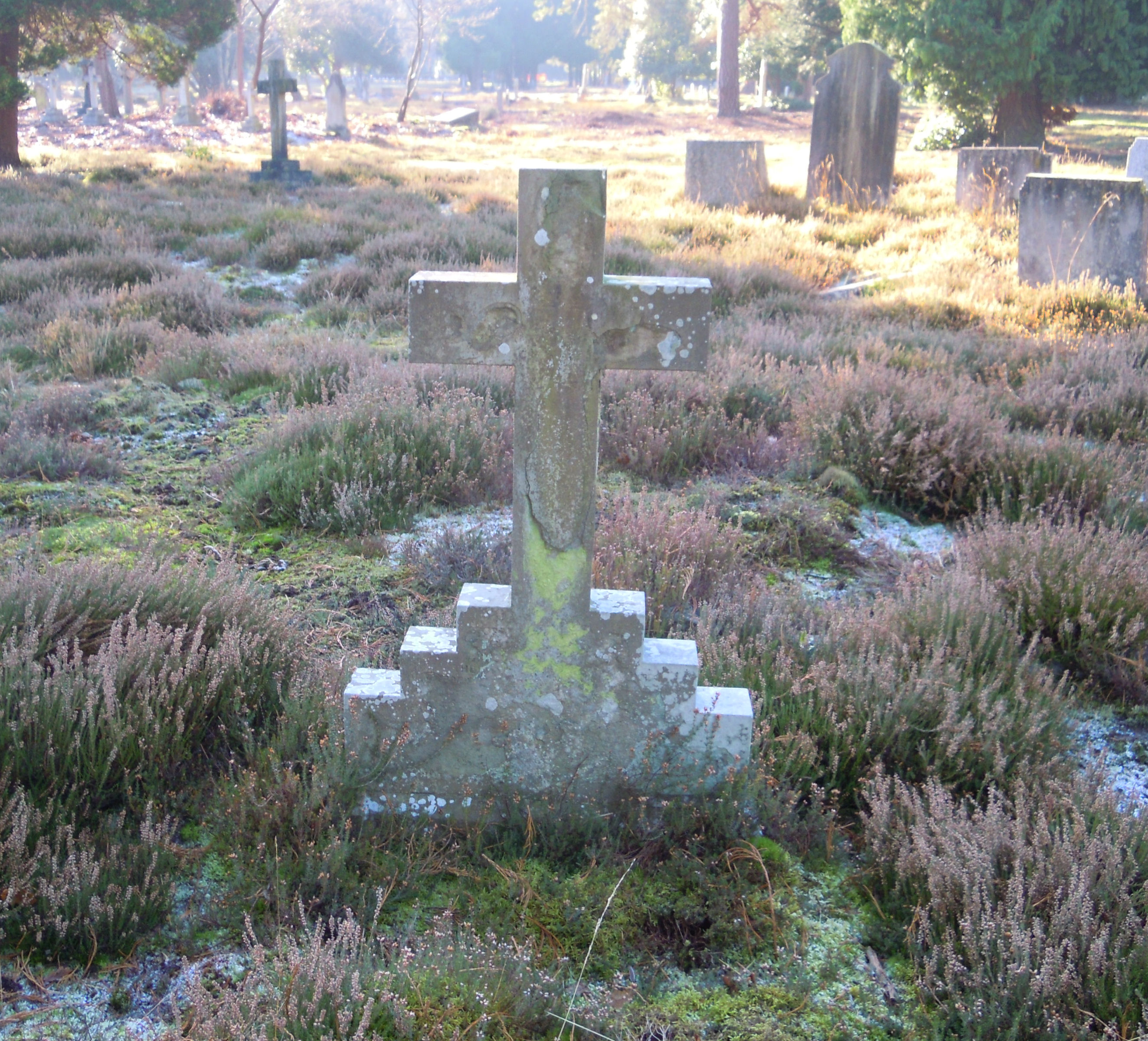
The grave of Thomas Humphrey in Brookwood Cemetery

He was known as the Pocket Hercules, because although short he could hit powerfully. He was particularly strong on the off-side, and appeared to have plenty of time to play his shots.

He umpired in a number of first-class matches between 1872 and 1877, including some Gentlemen v Players and North v South matches. In 1876, a benefit year at Surrey brought him £300, however he died two years later from congestion of the lungs in Brookwood Asylum. His brothers John, William and Richard also played first-class cricket.

He was the landlord of the Cricketers Inn at Westcott and the Ram Inn and the Jolly Butchers Inn, both in Dorking.

He is buried in Brookwood Cemetery.
