= Jennett Humphreys =

British author and poet

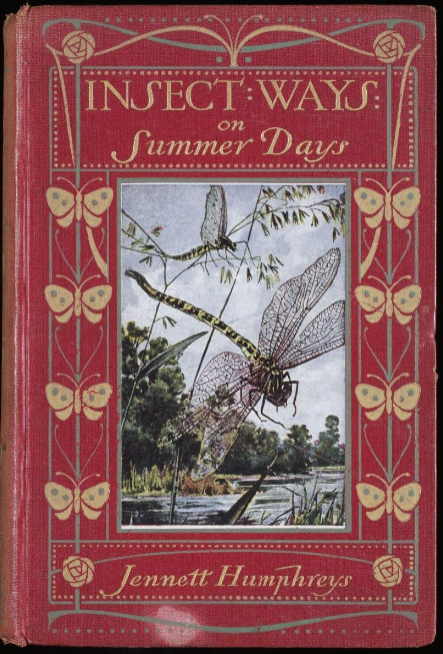
Insect ways on summer days: in garden, forest, field, and stream 1910

Jennett Humphreys (17 April 1829 – 6 February 1917) was a British author, poet, and contributor to major reference works.

== Life ==
Humphreys was born in 1829 in Cricklewood, a district in North London, to a Scottish father, Griffith Humphreys, and English mother, Sarah Leggett Humphreys. She came from a large family and she lived with her parents until they died. As a reader she supplied numerous quotations and other information for entries in the Oxford English Dictionary, much of which was a by-product of research for an unpublished book on the early history of cooking, and wrote an article on the OED for Fraser's Magazine. She was the author of nearly 100 articles in the Dictionary of National Biography becoming one of the top six contributors before being sacked without ceremony by Leslie Stephen.
