= Humphrys =

Humphrys is a surname. Notable people with the surname include:

- Bob Humphrys (1952–2008), BBC Wales sports broadcaster
- Fletcher Humphrys (born 1976), Australian actor
- Sir Francis Humphrys (1879–1971), British colonial administrator and diplomat
- John Humphrys (born 1943), BBC broadcaster
- Stephen Humphrys, English footballer
- William Humphrys (1794–1865), Irish engraver

== See also ==
- Humfrey, given name and surname
- Humphery, surname
- Humphrey, given name and surname
- Humphreys (surname)
- Humphry, surname
- Humphries, surname
