= Humphery =

Humphery is a surname. Notable people with the surname include:

- Bobby Humphery (born 1961), American football player
- Frederick Humphery (1841–1908), Australian politician
- William Humphery (1827–1909), British politician

== See also ==
- Humfrey, given name and surname
- Humphrey, given name and surname
- Humphry, surname
- Humphreys (surname)
- Humphries, surname
- Humphrys, surname
