= Madison Humphrey =

American TikToker

- Education: University of North Texas
- Occupations: social media influencer journalist
- Spouse: Brayden Humphrey (m. 2022)

TikTok information
- Page: madison.humphreyy
- Followers: 5 M
- Last updated: October 12, 2026

Madison Humphrey is an American social media influencer and former broadcast journalist.

== Education ==
Humphrey studied acting at a film school in Virginia before graduating with a journalism degree from the University of North Texas.

== Career ==
Humphrey began her career as a broadcast journalist with D210 TV in Dallas, Texas, where she worked as a sideline football reporter.

Humphrey began creating comedic content on TikTok during the COVID-19 pandemic in the United States. She started filming “point-of-view” videos depicting everyday character types, including leasing managers, relatives, and high-school “mean girls.” By 2025, she had expanded her content to include parody videos of other people’s online posts, such as weddings and gender-reveal parties.
