= Kevin Humphreys =

Kevin Humphreys may refer to:

- Kevin Humphreys (politician) (born 1958), Irish politician
- Kevin Humphreys (rugby league) (1930–2010), Australian rugby league player and administrator

== See also ==
- Kevin Humphries, Australian politician
