= John Humphrey (cricketer) =

English cricketer

John Humphrey (9 February 1837 – unknown) was an English first-class cricketer active 1870–81 who played for the Surrey Club. He was born in Mitcham and was the elder brother of Thomas, William and Richard Humphrey.
