= James Chatterton (cricketer) =

English cricketer

James Chatterton (1 April 1836 – 13 February 1891) was an English first-class cricketer active 1856–67 who played for Nottinghamshire. He was born and; died in Newark, Nottinghamshire.
