= Humphrey de Bassingbourne =

Humphrey de Bassingbourne (fl. 1206), was an English itinerant justice.

Humphrey, in the year 1206, when certain fines were acknowledged before him and Richard de Seing at St. Edmund's, Cambridge, and Bedford. On this occasion he is called Humphrey, archdeacon of Salisbury, and Foss has identified this Humphrey with the Humphrey de Bassingbourne who, according to Le Neve, was archdeacon of Sarum in various years from 1188 to 1222. William Henry Jones, however, in his work, Fasti Ecclesiæ Sarisberiensis, remarks that there were several archdeacons of the name of Humphrey in the diocese of Salisbury about this time, and that Le Neve is possibly confusing Humphrey, who was archdeacon of Wiltshire in 1214, with another Humphrey who was archdeacon of Salisbury in 1222.

We learn from an entry in the Close Rolls for 1208 that in April this year the goods of the archdeacon of Sarum, which had been confiscated at the time of the interdict, were restored to him; and from the same authority we learn that in 1216 Humphrey, archdeacon of Sarum, received letters of protection from the king. It was probably just previous to this that he had incurred the king's displeasure, and been obliged to pay a fine of one hundred marks and a palfrey as the price of his restoration to the king's favour.
