= Frederick K. Humphreys =

American physician (1816–1900)

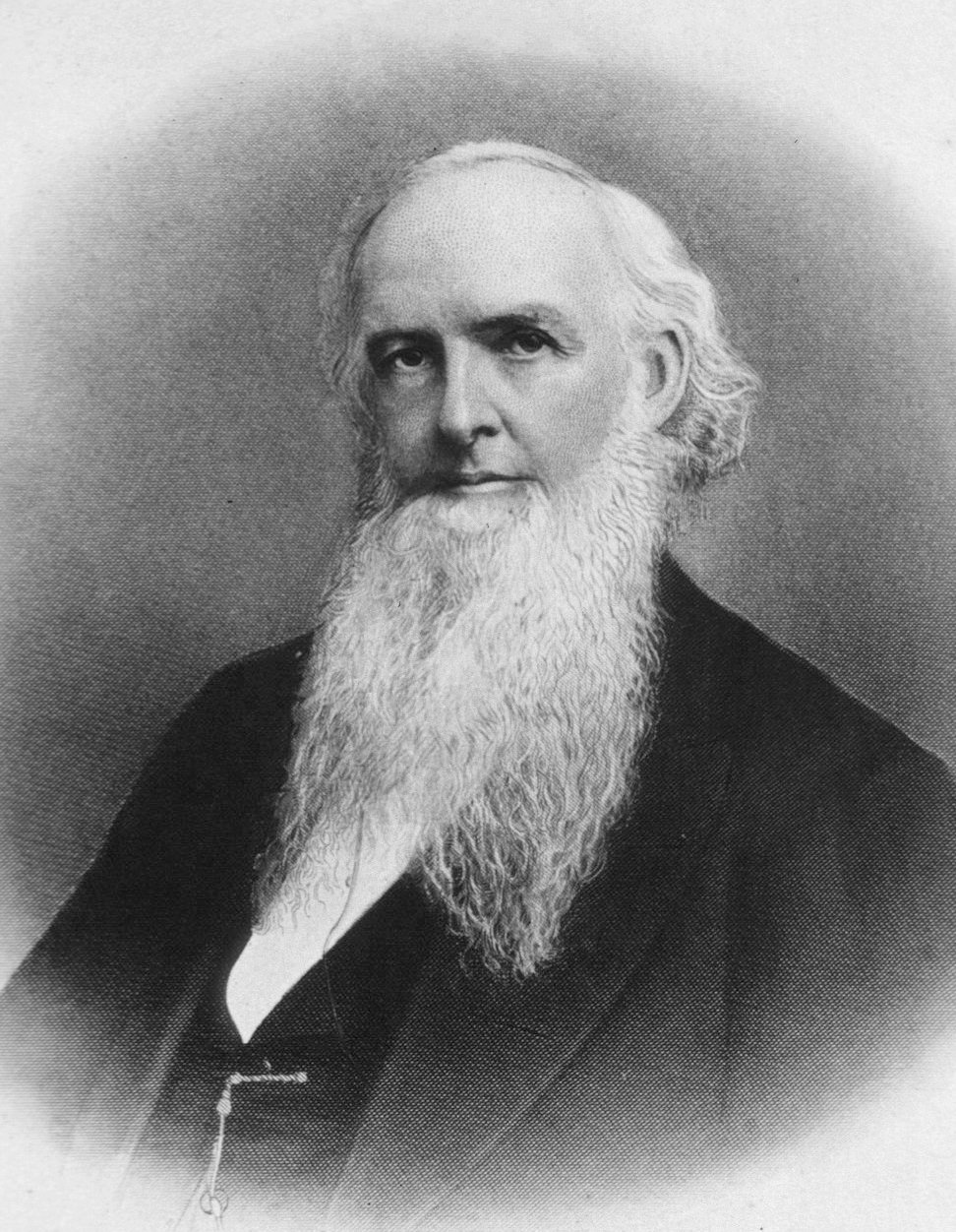
- Born: March 11, 1816; Marcellus, New York, US
- Died: July 18, 1900 (aged 84); Monmouth Beach, New Jersey, US
- Occupation: Homeopath
- Spouse(s): Cornelia Palmer (c1816–1840); Frances Maria Sperry (1826–1902)

Frederick K. Humphreys (March 11, 1816 – July 18, 1900) was an American physician and the founder of Humphreys Homeopathic Medicine Company in New York City in 1853.

== Biography ==
Frederick was born in Marcellus, New York, on March 11, 1816. Frederick was raised in Auburn, New York, where he went to the Auburn Academy. In 1832 he joined his uncle and brother in their clock business. In 1835 he returned home to manage his father's farm.

In 1837, at the age of 21, he married Cornelia Palmer (c 1816–1840), and they moved to Chillicothe, Ohio, where Cornelia's father lived. In Chillicothe Frederick entered the Methodist Episcopal ministry. His wife died in 1840 and Fredrick returned to Auburn as an itinerant preacher. On August 1, 1843, Frederick married his second wife, Frances Maria Sperry (1826–1902) of Ludlowville, Tompkins County, New York. They had the following children: Helen Frances Humphreys (1844–?); Frederick Hahnemann Humphreys (1847–1919); Alvah Jay Sperry Humphreys (1851–1884) who was the father of Frederic Erastus Humphreys; and Frank Landon Humphreys (1858–1937), an Episcopal priest, chaplain and canon of the Cathedral of St. John the Divine from 1900 to 1906, who later served as mayor of Boynton, Florida and chairman of the board of his father's company after his retirement from active ministry.

Humphreys began the study of medicine under his father, then, in 1848 attended the Homeopathic Medical College of Pennsylvania (later Hahnemann Medical College; now part of Drexel University College of Medicine) as one of the first class of fifteen students, earning joint M.D. and H.M.D. degrees.

Humphreys was the personal physician of Theron T. Pond (?–1852), and Humphreys claimed that Pond gave him permission to manufacture Pond's Creams before he died. Humphreys began to manufacture the product under the name "Pond's Extract". Palmer, who took over the Pond's corporation, received an injunction from Humphrey using the name 'Pond's Extract' or manufacturing the cream. Around 1871 the lawsuit of Palmer vs. Humphrey was still pending, when F. W. Hurtt, a banker of New York, bought the alleged rights from Humphrey Homeopathic Medicine Company, and took Palmer into the new partnership, giving him a one-eighth interest in the new corporation.

Frederick Humphreys died in 1900 in Monmouth Beach, New Jersey, and he was buried in Fort Hill Cemetery in Auburn.

== President ==
- Frederick K. Humphreys (1816–1900) from 1853 to 1900
- Frederick Hahnemann Humphreys (1847–1919) from 1900 to 1919
- Frederick Erastus Humphreys (1883–1941) from 1929 to 1941
- Suzanne Humphreys-Ford-de Florez (1915–2001) from 1954 to 2001. She was born in Far Hills, New Jersey on April 2, 1915 and died in Grand View-on-Hudson, New York on July 25, 2001.

== Company ==
- Humphreys Homeopathic Medicine Company (1854) in New York City
- Humphreys Medicine Company (1940)
- Humphreys Pharmacal, Inc. (1968) in Rutherford, New Jersey

== Publications ==
- Homoeopathic Treatment of Diseases of the Sexual System, a complete repertory. New York City, New York W. Radde. 144p. (1850)
- Dysentery and its Homoeopathic Treatment. Containing a repertory and cases. New York City, New York W. Radde. 87p. (1853)
- Homoeopathic Treatment of Diseases of the Sexual System, a complete repertory. 2d ed. Philadelphia, Pennsylvania Rademacher & Sheek. 144p. (1854)
- Humphrey's Manual of Specific Homoeopathy for the Administration of Medicine and Cure of Disease. Auburn, New York. 148p. (1856)
- Humphrey's Manual of Specific Homoeopathy for the Administration of Medicine and Cure of Disease. New York City, New York *Humphreys Specific Homoeopathic Medicine Co. 148p. (1858)
- Humphrey's Manual of Specific Homoeopathy for the Administration of Medicine and Cure of Disease. New York City, New York J. A. Gray Printer. 106p. (1859)
- Humphreys' homeopathic mentor: Or Family Adviser in the Use of Specific Homeopathic Medicine (1873)

== See also ==
- Humphreys' Specifics
