= Walter Humphreys (cricketer, born 1849) =

English cricketer

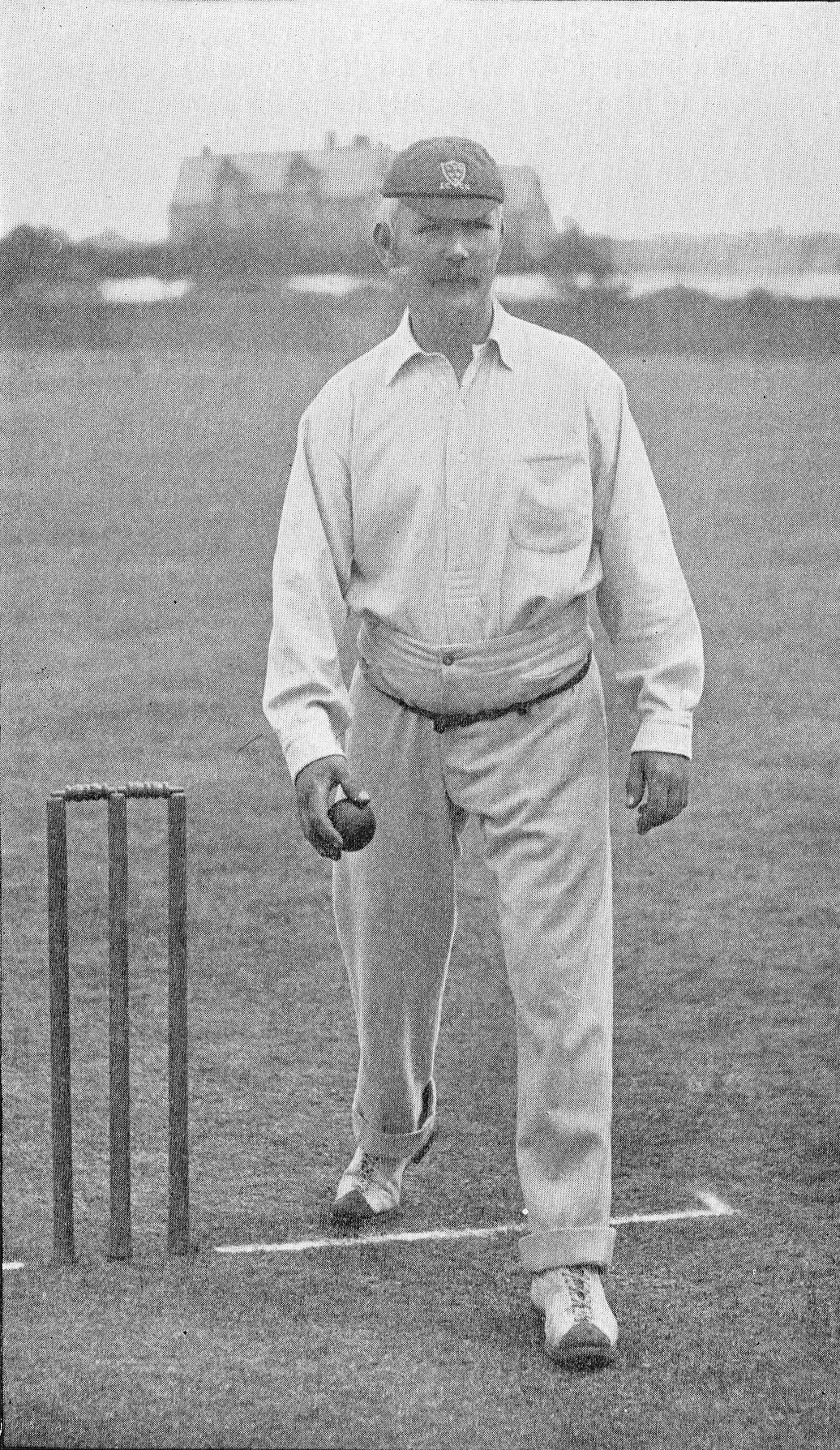
- Humphreys photographed c. 1897

Personal information
- Full name: Walter Alexander Humphreys
- Born: 28 October 1849; Southsea, Hampshire, England
- Died: 22 March 1924 (aged 74); Brighton, Sussex, England
- Nickname: Punter
- Height: 5 ft 7 in (1.70 m)
- Batting: Right-handed
- Bowling: Right-arm underarm slow
- Relatives: Walter Humphreys junior (son); George Humphreys (brother)

Domestic team information
- Years: Team
- 1871–1896: Sussex
- 1900: Hampshire

Career statistics
Competition	First-class
Matches	273
Runs scored	6,268
Batting average	16.11
100s/50s	1/17
Top score	117
Balls bowled	23,712
Wickets	718
Bowling average	21.52
5 wickets in innings	51
10 wickets in match	8
Best bowling	8/83
Catches/stumpings	217/–
- Source: Cricinfo, 24 January 2010

Walter Alexander Humphreys (28 October 1849 – 22 March 1924) was an English professional first-class cricketer. Considered one of the last and greatest lob bowlers, he played first-class cricket from 1871 to 1900, predominantly for Sussex. Beginning his career as a batsman, Humphreys reinvented himself as a lob bowler by 1880, which would bring him to public prominence. In first-class cricket, he took 718 wickets and was considered a capable enough batsman to be called an all-rounder. Humphreys is considered one of the greatest bowlers to have never played Test cricket, despite having been selected as a member of the England team which toured Australia in 1894–95.

== Cricket career ==
=== Sussex ===
==== Early years ====
Humphreys was born at Southsea in Portsmouth in October 1849, but moved to Sussex three weeks after his birth. Having shown good form for the Queen's Park Club, he was offered a trial by Sussex. Shortly thereafter, he made his debut in first-class cricket for Sussex against Kent at Hove in 1871, with him making four further appearances in his first season. He played irregularly for Sussex during the 1870s, and in his initial years he was utilised as a batsman and a fielder, who could keep wicket in an emergency. Prior to the 1878 season, he had taken no wickets in first-class cricket. Humphreys lost his place in the Sussex team during the 1878 season, and did not play for Sussex in 1879, having seemingly dropped out of the team on a permanent basis.

==== Reinvention as a lob bowler ====
By the 1880 season, Humphreys had reinvented himself as a lob bowler. By 1880, lob bowling was perceived as a lost art, previously exploited by the likes of Edward Drake, Thomas Goodrich, Roger Iddison, Walter Money, William Rose, and V. E. Walker. It wasn't long before his lob bowling bought him success, with Humphreys claiming a five wicket haul (5 for 32) against Surrey in August 1880, while later in the season against the touring Australians, he took a hat-trick when he dismissed Tom Groube, Alec Bannerman and Jack Blackham.

Despite this initial success, he had three sedate seasons as a bowler in which he never took more than 28 wickets in a season. In the 1883 season, he was Sussex's highest run scorer, with 497 runs. In 1884, he repeated his 1880 hat-trick feat against the touring Australians, this time dismissing Percy McDonnell, George Giffen and Tup Scott. The 1884 season was the first in which he took more than fifty wickets, in addition to claiming his then career best figures of 7 for 57 and taking ten-wickets in a match for the first time. The magazine Cricket proffered that Humphreys was amongst the chief contributors to Sussex's marked improvement in the 1884 season. His lob bowling was so effective in 1884 that he was chosen to play for the Players against the Australians at The Oval. He took 47 and 49 wickets in 1885 and 1886 respectively, while in 1886 he scored 735 runs, which would be his highest career season aggregate. In the seasons which followed, Humphreys played fewer matches for Sussex, but was also less effective with the ball, taking 25 wickets in each season from 1887 to 1889. In 1887, he scored his only first-class century when he made 117 against Cambridge University, sharing in a partnership of 136 for the sixth wicket with Jesse Hide. The following season, Humphreys and Arthur Hide played an important role in bowling Sussex to what remains, as of 2024, their only victory against the Australians, with Humphreys taking nine wickets in the match.

==== Success into the 1890s ====
Humphrey's began the 1890s by playing for Lord Sheffield's personal team against the touring Australians at Sheffield Park, and shortly thereafter he played in Sussex's first ever County Championship match against Nottinghamshire at Trent Bridge, beginning the decade by taking 31 wickets across the seventeen first-class matches he played in the 1890 season. He was provided with a benefit match by Sussex against Gloucestershire in 1891, in recognition of his twenty years service. The early completion of the match was a disappointment for his benefit, as the proceeds from the match were earmarked for Humphreys. Lord Sheffield contributed £100 toward the benefit. After taking 70 wickets in 1891 and 74 in 1892, Humphreys had his most successful season as a bowler in 1893, when he took 150 wickets from 21 matches – the only time he would take more than 100 wickets in a season – at an average of 17.32; he took nineteen five wicket hauls across the season, in addition to taking what would become his career best innings figures of 8 for 83 against Middlesex. His 122 wickets in the County Championship placed him second on the list of leading wicket-takers that season, behind J. T. Hearne with 137. His achievements in 1893 were all the more remarkable, given the short boundary on the pavilion side of the County Ground that allowed for easy scoring.

Although Humphreys played four fewer first-class matches in 1894, he was still nonetheless effective with his lobs, taking 47 wickets at an average of 22.61. In September of that season, he was selected to tour Australia that winter with an English team captained by Andrew Stoddart, which departed for Australia aboard the RMS Ophir on 21 September. It was hoped that Humphreys bowling would suit the pitches at the Sydney and Melbourne Cricket Ground's, which had traditionally not suited fast bowling. He struggled on the tour, posing little threat to batsmen, and thus did not feature in any of the Test matches; he did, however, play in four first-class matches against South Australia, Victoria, New South Wales, and a combined New South Wales and Queensland team, but took just six wickets at an average of 52.33. He was recorded as having performed well in the minor up-country matches. During the tour, Humphreys tried to recruit the Australian all-rounder Albert Trott for Sussex, however his "overtures" were not successful.

When he returned home, Humphreys was not the same bowler. In 1895, he took 26 wickets at an average of 26.92, with him taking the decision in December 1895 to retire from first-class cricket. He was subsequently nominated to stand as an umpire in first-class matches in 1896. Despite retiring in 1895, he returned to play two first-class matches for Sussex in 1896, against Hampshire and Cambridge University. He stood as an umpire in four first-class matches in 1896, officiating in three County Championship matches and the match between the North of England and the Australians. His brief foray into umpiring was not without controversy. Standing in a match between Surrey and Warwickshire, he no-balled Surrey's Bill Lockwood for having "gone through the form of bowling without delivering the ball", a move which was widely condemned. While playing for Sussex, he was recorded by Arthur Haygarth in Scores and Biographies as a shoemaker by trade. Alongside his first-class cricket, Humphreys was engaged as the professional for the Brighton Brunswick club, topping their batting and bowling averages, and played minor matches for Lord Sheffield's team at Sheffield Park, alongside his first-class appearances for his team.

=== Hampshire ===
Humphrey's later made two first-class appearances for Hampshire in the 1900 County Championship against Kent and Leicestershire. However, despite taking a five wicket haul against Kent, it was apparent that his best days were behind him, with Humphreys retiring from first-class cricket. With his second retirement, he was succeeded by Digby Jephson and George Simpson-Hayward as the leading English lob bowlers; The Times noted that despite the fame and success of his lob bowling, this did not have the effect of inspiring more cricketers to take up lob bowling, and by the mid-1920s it was a dead art.

=== Records and bowling style ===
Humphreys made 273 appearances in first-class cricket in a career which spanned nearly thirty years. 248 of these came for Sussex, for whom in his capacity as an all-rounder he scored 5,806 runs at a batting average of 16.12; alongside his single century, he also scored sixteen half centuries for Sussex. With his bowling, he took 682 wickets for Sussex at an average of 20.72; he claimed a total of 49 five wicket hauls and took ten-wickets in a match on eight occasions.

Humphreys bowling style was described as being "vigorous", with him bowling off of a long run-up which meant his follow-through took him well down the wicket. He was known to cleverly disguise his deliveries. Following Humphreys death, E. V. Lucas explained the manner in which he managed to deceive players in a letter to The Times. In it, he described how he used to let the cuff of his right sleeve flap over his hand mid-delivery, thus disguising the delievery he would bowl. He recounted a match in which he used this to deceive William Gunn, who he bowled around his legs with a delivery to which Gunn "made no effort to play except with his pads". He typically wore a pink flannel shirt whilst playing. The Australian William Murdoch recalled that during his unbeaten innings of 286 against Sussex in 1882, he could not tell by watching Humphreys hand which way he intended to turn the ball. In a letter, also to The Times following his death, Humphreys Sussex teammate George Brann went so far as to suggest that it was Humphreys and not Bernard Bosanquet who invented the googly, with Brann commenting that his disguised off-break came off the pitch at nearly double the speed of his normal leg break delivery, which he put forward as proof that Humphreys was the inventor of the googly. Neville Cardus wrote following his death: "No doubt the man in the street will smile at the mere mention of lobs. ‘Grubs’, he calls them derisively... But surely the success of Humphreys’ modest art, at a period great in batsmanship, cannot be dismissed with a smile of indulgence."

== Death ==
After retiring, Humphreys disappeared from public life. He died at his Brighton residence in March 1924, following a long illness. He was buried at the Brighton and Preston Cemetery, with the inscription on his tombstone reading: "The stumps are drawn, the final over bowled". His son, Walter junior, and brother George, were both first-class cricketers.

== Works cited ==
- Haygarth, Arthur (1879). Frederick Lillywhite's Cricket scores and Biographies. Vol. 12. London: Longman's & Co.
- Pearson, Harry (2013). The Trundlers. London: Little, Brown Book Group. ISBN 9781405515955.
