= Humphrey of Toron =

Humphrey of Toron may refer to:

- Humphrey I of Toron, Norman from Italy, fl. 1115
- Humphrey II of Toron (1117–1179), lord of Toron and constable of the Kingdom of Jerusalem, son of the above
- Humphrey III of Toron
- Humphrey IV of Toron (c. 1166 – before 1197), lord of Toron, Kerak, and Oultrejordain in the Kingdom of Jerusalem
