= Gemma Humphries =

British weather forecaster

Gemma Humphries is a former British weather forecaster.

After studying drama, Humphries worked for a small London radio station, then moved on to forecasting, having first become interested in weather when she took geography 'A' Level at school.

She trained as a broadcast meteorologist with the Met Office, before taking a job as regional weather presenter for the BBC in Southampton.

She joined Meridian Television as South East weather presenter in July 2000 and from Summer 2002, took over from Carl Tyler as the station's chief weather presenter. Humphries was made redundant in February 2009 as part of major cutbacks to Meridian's regional news services. She now works as a Creative Director for 'ODYLdesign', an online fashion firm.
