= David Humphreys =

David Humphreys may refer to:

- David Humphreys (soldier) (1752–1818), American Revolutionary War soldier and poet
- David Humphreys (rugby union) (born 1971), Irish rugby player
- David Campbell Humphreys (1817–1879), U.S. federal judge
- David Humphreys (cyclist) (1936–2021), Australian cyclist
- David Carlisle Humphreys (1855–1921), engineer, architect, educator and co-founder of Omicron Delta Kappa
- David L. Humphreys (born 1939), Canadian journalist, writer, lobbyist, and consultant

== See also ==
- David Humphries (1953–2020), English cricketer
- David Humphrey (born 1955), American painter and art critic
