= Edward Humphreys =

Edward Humphreys may refer to:

- Edward Wingfield Humphreys (1841–1892), New Zealand Member of Parliament
- Edward Morgan Humphreys (1882–1955), Welsh novelist, translator, and journalist
- Punter Humphreys (1881–1949), English first-class cricketer with the real name of Edward Humphreys
