= Richard Humphreys =

Richard Humphreys may refer to:

- Richard Humphreys (philanthropist) (1750–1832), U.S. Quaker philanthropist who funded the establishment of a school for African Americans
- Richard Humphreys (judge) (fl. 1980s–2020s), Irish judge and former politician
- Dick Humphreys (1896–1968), member of Irish Volunteers
- Richard Franklin Humphreys (1911–1968), American scientist
- Richard Humphreys (writer) (1953–2025), British writer
- Ritchie Humphreys (born 1977), British footballer
- Richard Humphreys, American advertising executive, CEO of Saatchi & Saatchi in the 1980s

== See also ==
- Richard Humphrey (disambiguation)
