= Anthony Humphreys =

Australian cricketer (born 1971)

Personal information
- Full name: Anthony John Rolph Hymphreys
- Born: 9 June 1971 (age 55); Launceston, Tasmania, Australia
- Batting: Left-handed
- Bowling: Right-arm fast-medium

Domestic team information
- Years: Team
- 1993/94: Tasmania
- Only FC: 24 February 1994 Tasmania v Western Australia

Career statistics
Competition	First-class
Matches	1
Runs scored	1
Batting average	–
100s/50s	0/0
Top score	1*
Balls bowled	177
Wickets	3
Bowling average	40.00
5 wickets in innings	0
10 wickets in match	0
Best bowling	2/63
Catches/stumpings	1/–
- Source: CricketArchive, 17 August 2010

Anthony John Rolph Humphreys (born 9 June 1971) is an Australian former cricketer who played one match for Tasmania against Western Australia in the 1993–94 Sheffield Shield season. He took three wickets in the match with his maiden first-class dismissal being that of Damien Martyn.
