= Humphrey, West Virginia =

Humphrey
- Unincorporated community
- Location within the state of West Virginia Humphrey (the United States)
- Coordinates: 39°8′33″N 81°43′53″W
- Country: United States
- State: West Virginia
- County: Wood
- Elevation: 600 ft (180 m)
- Time zone: UTC-5 (Eastern (EST))
  - Summer (DST): UTC-4 (EDT)
- GNIS ID: 1549754

Humphrey is an unincorporated community in Wood County, West Virginia, United States.
