= Walter Wright (cricketer) =

English cricketer

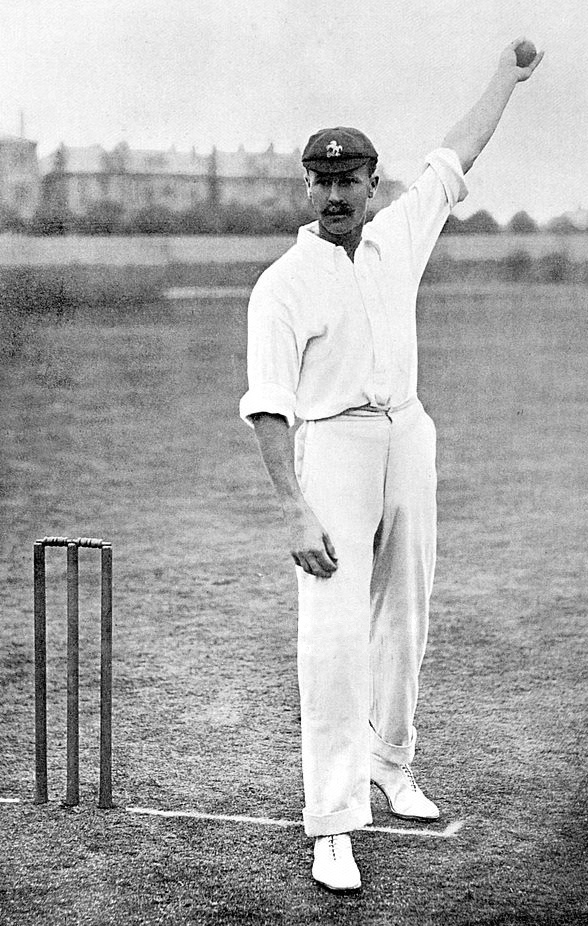
- Walter Wright

Personal information
- Full name: Walter Wright
- Born: 26 February 1856; Hucknall Torkard, Nottinghamshire, England
- Died: 22 May 1940 (aged 84); Leigh, Lancashire, England
- Batting: Right-handed
- Bowling: Left-arm fast-medium
- Relatives: Thomas Shooter (uncle)

Domestic team information
- Years: Team
- 1879–1886: Nottinghamshire
- 1888–1899: Kent
- 1904: Berkshire

Career statistics
Competition	First-class
Matches	289
Runs scored	4,075
Batting average	12.31
100s/50s	1/5
Top score	127*
Balls bowled	53,158
Wickets	976
Bowling average	19.52
5 wickets in innings	60
10 wickets in match	13
Best bowling	9/72
Catches/stumpings	136/–
- Source: Cricinfo, 24 September 2010

Walter Wright (born Walter Shooter, 29 February 1856 – 22 March 1940) was an English cricketer. He was a right-handed batsman and a left-arm medium-fast bowler. He was born in Hucknall Torkard and died in Leigh, Lancashire.

Wright's began playing county cricket in the 1879 season, representing Nottinghamshire for the first seven years of his career, having played his first professional game at the age of seventeen for the Notts Bank club, having been a creditable sprinter during his youth, as well as a football trainer.

Wright made his first-class debut against Lancashire, scoring a duck in his first innings, but bowling economically, conceding just twelve runs from five overs. He played four further matches during the 1879 season, his final game coming against Gloucestershire in which he scored a first-innings duck. Wright waited over nine months until his next first-class fixture, and between the following two, over a year, as he played for Gentlemen of Canada for the entirety of the 1880 season. When he returned for the team, having attended several games for Gentlemen of Canada, he immediately hit a poor patch of form, he continued in the lower-order for the rest of the year.

The English summer of 1882 saw an Australian tour of England, climaxing in a single Test in August, in which Wright played a single game, though he was immediately dropped to the tailend after this fixture, under pressure from an improving Alfred Shaw, the team's captain for four seasons as of 1883. However, this pressure spurred Wright to improve his stamina over the long game, and he appeared for the first time as a permanent fixture in the Nottinghamshire team, as well as playing in several special fixtures, including one for a WG Grace XI and one for North vs. South of England. The following year saw another tour by Australia, in which, after a stream of good form, Wright once again played. While 1886 saw further good form from Wright which saw him play in an England XI against Australia, this was to prove his final fixture for nearly two years. He had taken 193 wickets bowling for Nottinghamshire in county matches.

By the time of his return, in June 1888, Wright had moved to Kent, where, within his first month at the club, he was already being selected once again for North vs. South of England matches, as well as various Gentlemen vs. Players and selected elevens. Come 1890, the inaugural season of the newly formed County Championship, Wright was once again a fixture as a bowler, supported by Test cricketer Fred Martin. A steady performer in the first league season, Kent finished in equal-third position in the table, while Wright was one of only five Kent players who played in all fourteen games of the season, managing also to play all but one game in 1891, and again in 1892.

While his season-best scores were steadily declining season by season from his career-best century-score of the 1883 season, this form would come back in 1892, when he scored two half-centuries, his first for eight years. This good form for Wright would not show for the rest of the county, as they only managed to pick up two victories in the entire season, finishing second from bottom in the championship. Things were looking up, however, as for the first time since the inaugural season, Kent finished with a positive points total, and Wright with 300 runs to show for the season and a half-century to his credit. Kent had vastly improved come 1894, under the captaincy of Frank Marchant.

1895 was a poor season, Kent finishing bottom of the league, however, hope was not lost as fresh blood was pumped into the team, in the form of Bill Bradley and Fred Huish, and, the following season, improvements were seen in the consistency of both club and player, Wright and Martin forming, on various occasions, a successful bowling partnership. As Martin improved and moved up the order, his positioning in the lineup would be sacrificed to the blooming Fred Huish, in only his second season in the team. 1896 and 1897 saw Kent struggle with form as they had in 1895, in spite of Wright's significant improvement in deep field. While in 1897 and 1898 Wright would once again in most County Championship games, his speed in the field and at the crease had decreased with his advancing age, and the following year, he would quit the first-class game. He had taken 696 wickets bowling for Kent in 11 seasons.

WG Grace's held the opinion of Wright is that he believed him to be at the forefront of the creation and proliferation of swing bowling, a formidable prospect at his speed of movement, Wright being believed to be the second-fastest runner in the world in his prime sprinting days. Following his exit from playing, Wright became a first-class umpire, taking charge of 97 matches between 1900 and 1904 and one further game 20 years later. With decent knowledge and a love of football, Wright acted as a trainer to several football clubs, coaching Reading.

More information about Walter Wright's life can be found in his home town web site at Hucknall-Torkard.com by following the people link.

Wright's uncle, Thomas Shooter, played for Nottinghamshire during the 1881 season.

== Bibliography ==
- Carlaw, Derek (2020). Kent County Cricketers, A to Z: Part One (1806–1914) (PDF). Cardiff: ACS.
