= Frederic E. Humphreys =

Pioneer aviator (1883–1941)

Frederic Erastus Humphreys
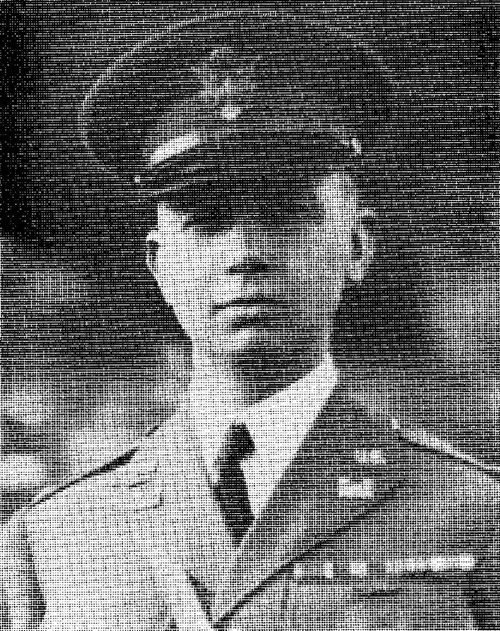
- Born: September 16, 1883; Summit, New Jersey, U.S.
- Died: January 20, 1941 (aged 57); Miami Beach, Florida, U.S.
- Resting place: Arlington National Cemetery
- Occupation: Aviator
- Parent(s): Alvah Jay Sperry Humphreys; Fannie Brush
- Military career
- Allegiance: United States of America
- Branch: United States Army; New York National Guard; U.S. Army Reserve
- Service years: 1906–1910 (USA); 1915–1939 (NYNG); 1920–1939 (USAR)
- Rank: Brigadier General (NYNG); Colonel (USAR)
- Commands: 102nd Engineers Regiment
- Conflicts: Mexican Border War; World War I

Frederic Erastus Humphreys (Note: His first name is spelled "Frederick" in some sources.) (September 16, 1883 – January 20, 1941) was one of the original three military pilots trained by the Wright brothers and the first to fly solo.

== Biography ==
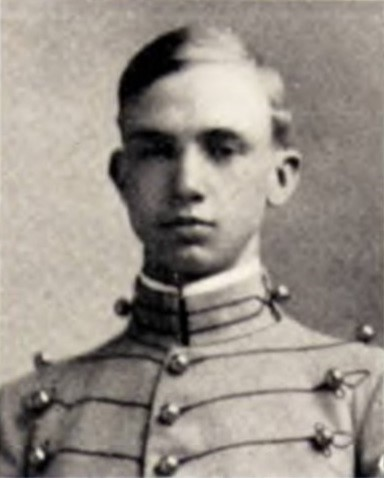
At West Point in 1906

Humphreys was born on September 16, 1883, in Summit, New Jersey, the only son of Jay Humphreys and Fannie Brush. He attended the Pennsylvania Military College, and won an appointment from New York to the United States Military Academy at West Point, New York. He was made Cadet Captain, he lettered in fencing, and was the top eighth student of seventy-eight in the West Point Class of 1906. After graduation and commissioning, he was assigned to the Army Corps of Engineers and sent to Fort Riley, Kansas, where he worked in bridge construction. 2nd Lt. Humphreys deployed to Cuba during the Pacification Expedition, and a year later, returned to attend the Engineer Officer Basic Course.

Humphreys volunteered for assignment to the Aeronautical Division, U.S. Signal Corps and was chosen to replace Benjamin Foulois in pilot training by the Wright brothers. On October 26, 1909, after three hours of instruction by Wilbur Wright, he became the first Army aviator to solo in a heavier-than-air craft, and thus the first pilot of the first progenitor of the United States Air Force. The Army's sole military airplane crashed on November 5, 1909. After repairs, it was subsequently ordered to Fort Sam Houston, Texas, but on a different program. Meanwhile, Humphreys returned to the Corps of Engineers.

In 1910, Humphreys resigned his commission to attend to his father's business, the Humphreys Homeopathic Medicine Company, founded by his grandfather in 1853. Thereafter he served as an officer of the company, the last twelve years of his life as its president.

=== National Guard ===
In June 1915, Humphreys joined the New York National Guard's 22d Engineers Regiment as a First Lieutenant. He was called up with his regiment for Mexican Border service after Pancho Villa's raids in 1916, he served as an aide to Major General John F. O'Ryan, Commanding General of the New York (later 27th) Division. Shortly after his return to New York, the regiment was inducted into federal service for World War I.

After initial service with his regiment at the divisional training post at Spartanburg, South Carolina, he was recalled and was transferred to the Air Service in January 1918. After flight training at Rockwell Field in San Diego, California, he was assigned to the first class of the School of Military Aeronautics at the Massachusetts Institute of Technology for advanced technical training. He remained at MIT as head of the school's Department of Practical Aircraft Design, and then was made school commander. At about the time of the Armistice, he was assigned to the newly founded Technical Section, Engineering Division, at McCook Field, in Dayton, Ohio, remaining there until he was demobilized in February 1919.

Humphreys returned to New York and was appointed Colonel of the 102nd Army Engineers, a position he had until his retirement due to ill health on July 11, 1939. On November 5, 1920, he received federal recognition as a colonel of engineers in the United States Army Reserve. At the time of his retirement, Humphreys was the senior Colonel of New York. He was advanced to Brigadier General on the State Retired List.

=== Marriages ===
In December 1910, Humphreys married Myrtle Lee Fears (January 31, 1888 – January 28, 1980) in New York City. In 1931, they divorced and he married Ethel McClellan Plummer. After his second wife's death in October 1936, Frederic and Myrtle Humphreys remarried on December 7, 1936, in Manhattan.

=== Death ===
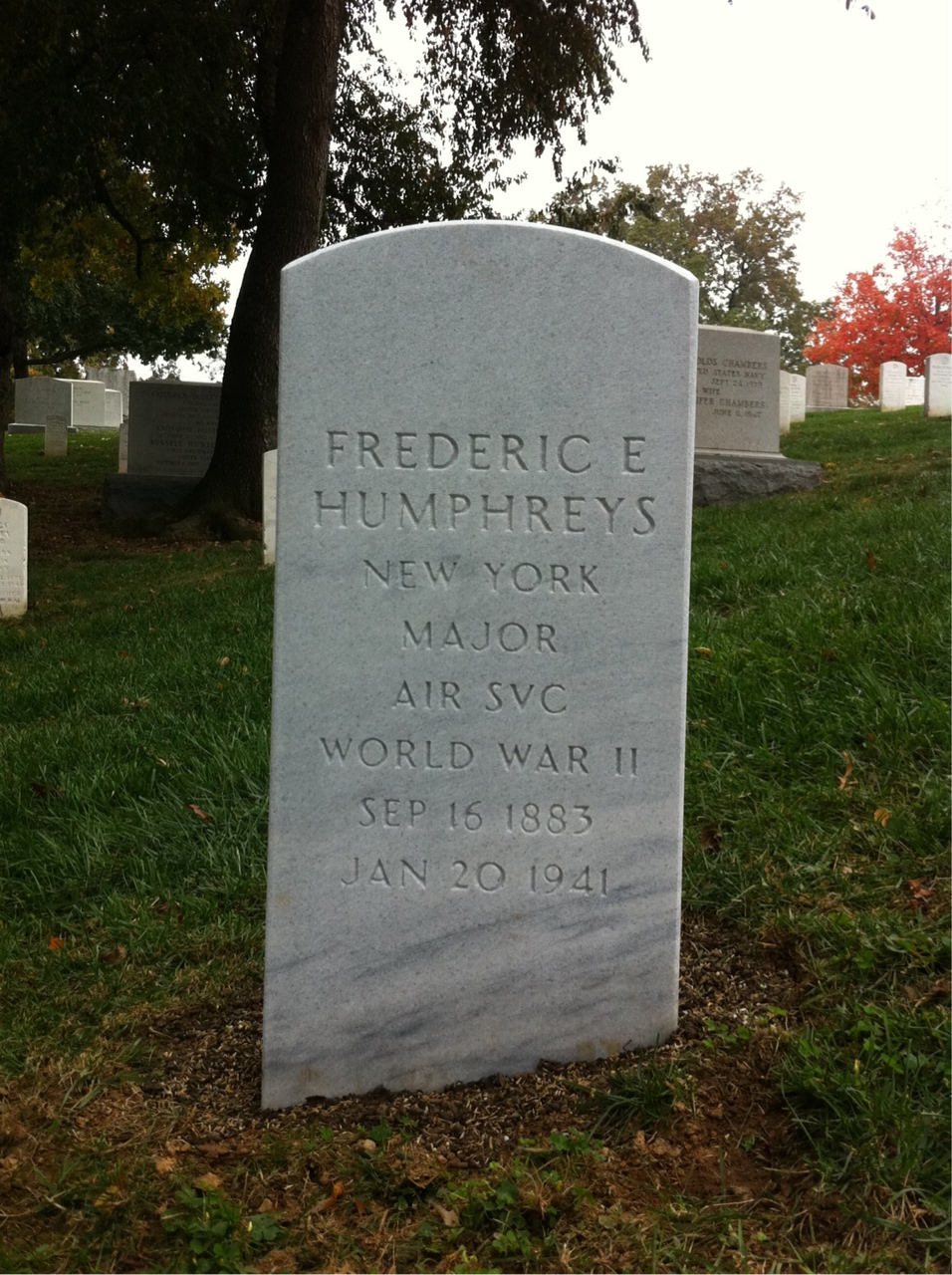
Frederic E. Humphreys gravestone (front)

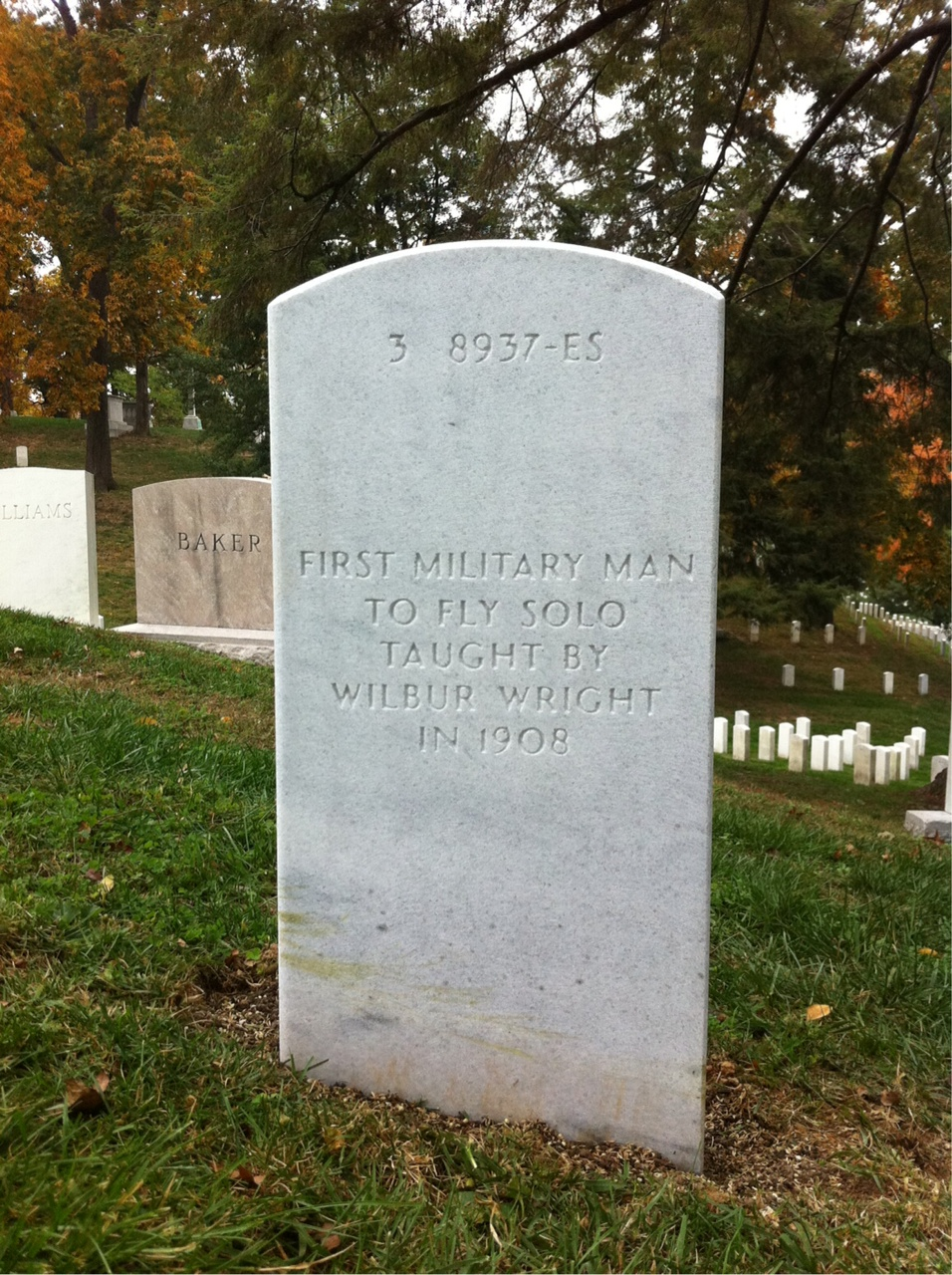
Frederic E. Humphreys gravestone (back)

Recuperating from pneumonia in Miami Beach, Florida, Humphreys had a heart attack and died in 1941. He was 57 years old, and was buried in Arlington National Cemetery. Despite having been a brigadier general in the New York National Guard and a colonel in the U.S. Army Reserve, his gravestone is marked "Major, Air Svc" in recognition of his contributions to military aviation during World War I.

== Organizations ==
- National Foreign Trade Council
- New York Board of Trade
- American Museum of Natural History
- National Geographic Society
- American Legion
- Institute of Aeronautical Sciences
- West Point Association of Graduates

== See also ==
- List of accidents and incidents involving military aircraft (pre-1925)
