= Henry Holmes (cricketer) =

English cricketer and umpire

Personal information
- Full name: Henry Holmes
- Born: 11 November 1833; Romsey, Hampshire, England
- Died: 6 January 1913 (aged 79); Southampton, Hampshire, England
- Batting: Right-handed
- Bowling: Right-arm roundarm medium
- Role: Occasional wicketkeeper

Domestic team information
- Years: Team
- 1861–1862: Hampshire (pre-county club)
- 1863–1878: Hampshire

Umpiring information
- FC umpired: 110 (1877–1899)

Career statistics
Competition	First-class
Matches	32
Runs scored	798
Batting average	14.77
100s/50s	–/4
Top score	77
Balls bowled	1,878
Wickets	28
Bowling average	27.21
5 wickets in innings	2
10 wickets in match	–
Best bowling	5/57
Catches/stumpings	14/1
- Source: Cricinfo, 20 February 2010

Henry Holmes (11 November 1833 — 6 January 1913) was an English first-class cricketer and cricket umpire. He was a member of Hampshire County Cricket Club's eleven for its inaugural first-class match against Sussex in 1864.

== First-class and umpiring careers ==
Holmes was born at Romsey in November 1833. A professional cricketer, he made his debut in first-class cricket for Hampshire against the Marylebone Cricket Club at Lord's in 1861. On debut, he claimed his maiden five wicket haul with figures of 8 for 82. During the early 1860s, he was engaged as the professional by a variety of clubs across Hampshire and Sussex. He continued to play minor matches for Hampshire until the formation of Hampshire County Cricket Club in 1863, and their subsequent elevation to first-class status in 1864. He played in the nascent county club's inaugural first-class match that season against Sussex at Southampton. He was a member of the Gentlemen of Hampshire side who inflicted Surrey's only defeat in 1864, though the match held no status. Holmes played first-class cricket for Hampshire until 1878, making 27 appearances, and was considered by the cricket historian Alan Edwards as "one of the unsung heroes of Hampshire cricket", In these 27 matches, he scored 692 runs at an average of 15.04; he made three half centuries, with a highest score of 71. With his right-arm roundarm medium bowling, he took 22 wickets at a bowling average of 29.90; he took one five wicket haul, with figures of 5 for 57 against Derbyshire in 1876. Holmes also played first-class cricket for the South against Surrey in 1864, the Players of the South against the Gentlemen of the South at The Oval in 1868, and for a United England Eleven in 1865, and for a United South of England Eleven in 1876. It was for the Gentlemen of the South that he made his highest first-class score of 77.

Holmes also stood as a first-class umpire, officiating in his first match in 1877 between Hampshire and Kent. He umpired in first-class cricket until 1899, standing in 110 first-class matches; amongst these were some of the first matches in the County Championship, which was formed in 1890. In 1898, he stood in the match between Yorkshire and Derbyshire at Chesterfield in which the Yorkshire pair of Jack Brown and John Tunnicliffe put on a world record partnership of 554. Alongside his umpiring, he had also been employed as a groundsman for Hampshire, in addition to playing his club cricket for Totton Cricket Club. Holmes died at Southampton in January 1913; he was amongst the last survivors of the county club's inaugural first-class match in 1864. He was buried alongside his wife, Harriet, at St. Mary's Church in Eling near Southampton.
