= Bob Humphries =

English footballer

Personal information
- Full name: Robert Humphries
- Date of birth: 4 July 1933
- Place of birth: Hindhead, England
- Date of death: 1988 (aged 54)
- Place of death: Spain
- Positions: Right half; inside forward

Senior career*
Years	Team	Apps	(Gls)
–1955	Tottenham Hotspur	0	(0)
1955–1956	Eastbourne United		
1956	Sheffield United	0	(0)
1956–1957	Brighton & Hove Albion	10	(2)
1957–1960	Millwall	47	(4)
1960	Chelmsford City		
1960–1961	Hastings United		
1961–1962	Cambridge United		
1962–196?	Hastings United		
196?–1966	Tunbridge Wells Rangers		
1966–1968	Bognor Regis Town		

Managerial career
- 1966–1968: Bognor Regis Town (player-manager)
- * Club domestic league appearances and goals

Robert Humphries (4 July 1933 – 1988) was an English professional footballer who played as a right half or inside forward in the Football League for Brighton & Hove Albion and Millwall.

== Life and career ==
Humphries was born in Hindhead, Surrey, in 1933. He was on the books of Tottenham Hotspur as an amateur and then played for Sussex County League club Eastbourne United. After a month's trial with First Division club Sheffield United, he signed professional forms in February 1956. He never made a league appearance, and moved on later that same year to Brighton & Hove Albion, for whom he made his debut in the Football League in November. Humphries made ten appearances in the Third Division South for Albion, scoring twice, before joining another third-tier club, Millwall. After three years and 47 league appearances, he returned to non-league football with Chelmsford City, Hastings United, Cambridge United, a return to Hastings, where he was a member of the team promoted to the Southern League Premier Division in 1962–63, Tunbridge Wells Rangers and Bognor Regis Town, where he acted as player-manager. Humphries died in a car accident in Spain in 1988 at the age of 54.
