= John Humphries =

John Humphries may refer to:

- John Humphries (author), Welsh journalist, author and politician
- John Humphries (baseball) (1861–1933), Canadian baseball player
- John Barry Humphries (1934–2023), Australian comedian

== See also ==
- John Humphreys (disambiguation)
