= Walter Humphreys (cricketer, born 1878) =

English cricketer

Personal information
- Full name: Walter Alexander Humphreys
- Born: 28 June 1878; Brighton, Sussex, England
- Died: 1 January 1960 (aged 81); Hove, Sussex, England
- Batting: Right-handed
- Bowling: Right-arm underarm slow
- Relatives: Walter Humphreys senior (father); George Humphreys (uncle)

Domestic team information
- Years: Team
- 1898–1900: Sussex

Career statistics
Competition	First-class
Matches	14
Runs scored	81
Batting average	5.78
100s/50s	–/–
Top score	27
Balls bowled	1,958
Wickets	48
Bowling average	28.18
5 wickets in innings	2
10 wickets in match	–
Best bowling	5/107
Catches/stumpings	9/–
- Source: Cricinfo, 15 March 2012

Walter Alexander Humphreys (28 June 1878 – 1 January 1960) was an English cricketer. Humphreys was a right-handed batsman who bowled right-arm underarm slow. He was born in Brighton, Sussex.

Humphreys made his first-class debut for Sussex against Middlesex in the 1898 County Championship. He made thirteen further first-class appearances for the county, the last of which came against Surrey in the 1900 County Championship. In his fourteen first-class matches for Sussex, he took 48 wickets at an average of 28.18, with best figures of 5/107. One of two five-wicket hauls he took, these figures came against Hampshire in 1899. With the bat, he scored 81 runs at a batting average of 5.78, with a high score of 27.

He died at Hove, Sussex, on 1 January 1960. His father, Walter Humphreys Sr, played first-class cricket, like his uncle George Humphreys.
