= Onslow Humphreys =

- Born: Oliver W. Humphreys c. 1893 Sydney

Rugby union career
- Position: fly-half
International career
Years	Team	Apps	(Points)
1920–25	Wallabies	6	(3)

Oliver W. "Onslow" Humphreys (born c. 1893) was a rugby union player who represented Australia.

Humphreys, a fly-half, was born in Sydney and claimed a total of 6 international rugby caps for Australia.
