= John Humphreys =

John Humphreys may refer to:

- John Humphreys (economist) (born 1978), Australian economist and Liberal Democratic Party first President
- John Lisseter Humphreys (1881–1929), British colonial administrator and Governor of North Borneo
- John Humphreys (cricketer), Australian cricketer
- John Humphreys (fencer) (1932–2017), Australian Olympic fencer
- John F. Humphreys (1839–1922), American politician

== See also ==
- John Humphrys (born 1943), Welsh broadcaster, journalist and author
- John Humphries (disambiguation)
- John Humphrey (disambiguation)
- Jonathan Humphreys (born 1969), Welsh rugby player
