= Frank Silcock (footballer) =

Australian rules footballer

Personal information
- Full name: Francis Clair Silcock
- Born: 17 October 1894; Morwell, Victoria
- Died: 29 July 1974 (aged 79); Yinnar, Victoria
- Original team: Hazlewood

Playing career^{1}
Years	Club	Games (Goals)
1921	St Kilda	4 (1)
- ^{1} Playing statistics correct to the end of 1921.

Frank Silcock (17 October 1894 – 29 July 1974) was an Australian rules footballer who played with St Kilda in the Victorian Football League (VFL).
