= Arthur Humphreys =

Arthur L. C. Humphreys (1917–2003) was a managing director of International Computers Limited and a long-time member of the British computer industry.

He joined the British Tabulating Machine Company in 1940, and was involved in the negotiations with Powers-Samas that led to the formation of International Computers and Tabulators in 1958. In 1968, on the formation of ICL, he became its first Managing Director. When Geoff Cross became managing director in 1972, Humphreys was moved to the post of Deputy Chairman, where he remained until his retirement in 1983.
