= William Humphrey (cricketer) =

English cricketer

Personal information
- Full name: William Humphrey
- Born: 15 September 1843; Mitcham, Surrey, England
- Died: 24 February 1918 (aged 74); Norwich, Norfolk, England
- Height: 5 ft 8 in (1.73 m)
- Batting: Right-handed
- Bowling: Right-arm roundarm fast
- Relatives: Richard Humphrey (brother); Thomas Humphrey (brother); John Humphrey (brother)

Domestic team information
- Years: Team
- 1864: Hampshire
- 1864: Surrey

Career statistics
Competition	First-class
Matches	8
Runs scored	99
Batting average	7.61
100s/50s	–/–
Top score	25
Balls bowled	478
Wickets	6
Bowling average	41.33
5 wickets in innings	–
10 wickets in match	–
Best bowling	3/61
Catches/stumpings	1/–
- Source: Cricinfo, 12 February 2010

William Humphrey (15 September 1843 — 24 February 1918) was an English first-class cricketer.

Humphrey was born at Mitcham in September 1843. In 1862, he was engaged at Southampton by Hampshire, where he remained for three seasons. In his second season, Hampshire County Cricket Club was founded. However, it was for his native Surrey that he made his debut in first-class cricket, against Sussex at The Oval in 1864; he made three further first-class appearances for Surrey in 1864, and later in that season he made four first-class appearances for Hampshire (playing two matches each against Middlesex and Sussex; the first match against Sussex was Hampshire County Cricket Club's inaugural first-class match). In eight first-class matches, Humphrey scored 99 runs at an average of 7.61; with the ball, he took 6 wickets with best figures of 3 for 61. Thereafter in 1865, he was engaged at East Dereham or Swaffham, and played minor matches for Norfolk. Humphrey remained in Norfolk in later life, dying at Norwich in February 1918. His brothers, Richard, Thomas and John, all played first-class cricket.
