= Humphry =

- Gender: Male

Other names
- Related names: Humphrys, Humphrey

Humphry is a masculine given name and surname. It comes from the Old Germanic name Hunfrid, which means "friend of the hun". The name may refer to:

== People ==
=== First name ===
- Humphry Berkeley (1926–1994), British politician
- Humphry Bowen (1929–2001), British botanist and chemist
- Humphry Davy (1778–1829), British scientist
- Humphry Ditton (1675–1715), British mathematician
- Humphry Garratt (1898–1974), British cricket player
- Humphry Knipe (1941–2023), South African writer
- Humphry Legge, 8th Earl of Dartmouth (1888–1962), British police officer
- Humphry Marshall (1722–1801), American botanist
- Humphry Morice (1671–1731), British banker
- Humphry Osmond (1917–2004), British psychiatrist
- Humphry Repton (1752–1818), British landscape designer
- Humphry Rolleston (1862–1944), British physician
- Humphry Tlou (1995), South African scientist and engineer
- Thomas Humphry Ward (1845–1926), British writer
- Humphry William Woolrych (1795–1871), British lawyer and writer

=== Surname ===
- C. E. Humphry (1843–1925), British journalist
- Derek Humphry (1930–2025), British and American journalist and author
- George Humphry (1816–1867), British cricketer
- George Murray Humphry (1820–1896), British doctor and writer
- Jay Humphry (born 1948), Canadian figure skater
- Ozias Humphry (1742–1810), British painter
- William Gilson Humphry (1815–1886), British clergyman

== Fiction ==
- Humphry Clinker, fictional character in the novel The Expedition of Humphry Clinker by Tobias Smollett

== See also ==
- Humfrey, given name and surname
- Humphery, surname
- Humphrey, a more common spelling
- Humphreys (surname)
- Humphries, surname
- Humphrys, surname
