= William Humphreys =

William Humphreys may refer to:

- William Humfrey (died 1579), also written William Humphreys, Elizabethan goldsmith
- William Humphreys Jackson (1839–1915), U.S. Congressman from Maryland
- William Jackson Humphreys (1862–1949), American physicist and meteorologist
- Billy Humphreys (1884–?), English footballer
- William Benbow Humphreys (1889–1965), South African politician
- William Y. Humphreys (1890–1933), U.S. Congressman from Mississippi
- William Humphreys (footballer), English footballer

== See also ==
- William Humfreys (died 1735), Lord Mayor of London
- Bill Humphries, actor
- Billy Humphries (born 1936), Northern Irish footballer
- William Humphrey (disambiguation)
