= Tom Humphries =

Irish journalist

- Born: London, United Kingdom
- Education: St. Joseph's Secondary C.B.S., Fairview; University College Dublin
- Occupation: Former sports journalist

Tom Humphries is a former sports journalist and columnist who wrote for The Irish Times while volunteering at a North Dublin Gaelic games club. His career as a leading sportswriter was ended after his history of child sexual abuse emerged in 2011. In 2017, he pleaded guilty to a number of child sex offences and received a 2 1/2 year imprisonment sentence. Maeve Sheehan, writing in the Sunday Independent, noted as his prison sentence concluded in 2019: "As one of the few sex offenders who was famous before he went to prison, his crimes ensure his name will stay on the public radar for years to come. But as the paedophile, not the writer".

== Early life ==
Humphries was born in London and grew up in Foxfield, Raheny, in Dublin. He was educated at St Joseph's Christian Brothers School in Fairview. He has a Bachelor of Commerce degree and a Higher Diploma in Education from University College Dublin (UCD). He ran unsuccessfully for the office of President of the UCD Student Union in 1986; Ulick Stafford defeated him.

== The Irish Times ==
Humphries began writing columns for The Irish Times during the early 1990s. His writings contained references to "the cunning of paedophiles" and of sport as "a fine feeding ground for those few sick minds who prey on kids".

He was for many years a regular among children at a North Dublin Gaelic games club.

Besides his regular sports reporting and feature articles, Humphries wrote a Monday column in The Irish Times called "Locker Room".

A collection of his writings for The Irish Times and Sports Illustrated was published in 2004 as Booked! and was nominated for the William Hill Sports Book of the Year Award. The book's royalties went to Amnesty International.

== Roy Keane interview ==
Humphries received international attention in May 2002 for his interview with Irish footballer Roy Keane on the island of Saipan, during the national football team's preparation to take part in the 2002 FIFA World Cup. Originally, Humphries planned to write an article based on the interview, but Keane's openly critical remarks about preparations for the World Cup and the attitudes of the team management, the players, and the Football Association of Ireland, led to the interview appearing as a verbatim transcript on the front page of The Irish Times (an almost unheard of action) and continuing inside the newspaper. The resulting furore caused Keane to resign from the squad before the tournament started, and he was also dismissed by the team manager, Mick McCarthy.

== Niall Quinn book ==
Humphries was the ghost writer of Irish football player Niall Quinn's autobiography, Niall Quinn – The Autobiography, published in 2002. It won the Best Autobiography category in the inaugural British Sports Book Awards, and was nominated for a William Hill Sports Book of the Year award. The book is not structured chronologically, but rather in the context of Quinn's career swansong, the 2002 World Cup in South Korea and Japan.

== Gaelic games ==
Humphries volunteered at a North Dublin Gaelic games club.

His first book, Green Fields: Gaelic Sport in Ireland, analysed the importance of the Gaelic Athletic Association in Ireland, a recurring theme of his work.

His book Dublin V Kerry gave an account of historic clashes between the two dominant teams in Gaelic football of the mid-to-late 1970s.

=== Collaboration with Donal Óg Cusack ===
Humphries co-wrote Come What May, the autobiography of the openly gay hurler Donal Óg Cusack. It won the William Hill Irish Sports Book of the Year. Tony Kenny, PR Manager for William Hill, said at the time: "Donal Og's book is an excellently told story of ... someone who wasn't afraid to put themselves forward as a role model to many in sport and life not just in Ireland but across the world."

== Sexual abuse conviction ==
In 2011, Humphries's child sex abuse came to light when his daughter discovered messages of a sexual nature on an old mobile phone of Humphries; the messages were exchanged between Humphries and a 14-year-old girl with an eating disorder who played at the North Dublin Gaelic games club with which Humphries volunteered. This led to a police investigation that eventually revealed that Humphries had sent the girl thousands of sexually-explicit texts before going on to meet her for sexual acts. Humphries subsequently spent a year in a psychiatric facility, before being arrested in September 2012. He was charged in March 2014. He had not written for The Irish Times since 2011, but was formally suspended after being charged.

In March 2017, Humphries pleaded guilty to two counts of defilement of a child and four counts of inviting a child to participate in a sexually explicit, obscene or indecent act. The Irish Times terminated his employment after his guilty plea. Reporting restrictions on the case had been in place until June 2017; they were lifted after three charges involving another girl were dropped. Judge Karen O'Connor sentenced Humphries to 2 1/2 years in jail on 24 October 2017. When sentencing, she took into account Humphries's guilty plea and the two character references for the defence from the journalist David Walsh and the hurler Donal Óg Cusack. The chief executive of the Dublin Rape Crisis Centre was surprised and disappointed about the sentence's leniency.

== Prison ==
Humphries began serving his sentence at the Midlands Prison in Portlaoise.

Humphries was offered therapy but declined, having earlier claimed he was remorseful for his crimes while in court. In prison, he shared a landing with Graham Dwyer, who murdered Elaine O'Hara, and shared his cell with John Tighe, who killed his baby son. While serving his sentence he called a prison officer an "uneducated turnkey". The officer was reported by the Irish Independent at the time to have responded: "I would rather be an uneducated turnkey than an educated paedophile". He studied Spanish while in jail, believed to be an indicator of his intentions upon completion of his sentence; Humphries spent time in Spain before his trial.

Humphries was released from prison on 16 August 2019, having served 19 months.

== Bibliography ==
- Green Fields: Gaelic Sport in Ireland (Weidenfeld Nicolson Illustrated, ISBN 978-0-297-83566-0, 1996)
- Laptop Dancing and the Nanny Goat Mambo: A Sportswriter's Year (Pocket Books/Town House, ISBN 1-903650-53-4, 2003)
- Booked! (V. Carefully) Selected Writings (Town House, ISBN 1-86059-212-0, 2004)
- Dublin V Kerry (Penguin Ireland, ISBN 1-84488-085-0, 2006)
