= 1900 County Championship =

English cricket tournament

- Cricket format: First-class cricket (3 days)
- Tournament format: League system
- Champions: Yorkshire (4th title)
- Participants: 15
- Matches: 166
- Most runs: K. S. Ranjitsinhji (2,563 for Sussex)
- Most wickets: Wilfred Rhodes (206 for Yorkshire)

The 1900 County Championship was the 11th officially organised running of the County Championship, and ran from 7 May to 1 September 1900. Yorkshire County Cricket Club won their fourth championship title, remaining unbeaten throughout the season. Lancashire finished as runners-up, their best position since winning the Championship in 1897.

== Table ==
- One point was awarded for a win, and one point was taken away for each loss. Final placings were decided by dividing the number of points earned by the number of completed matches (i.e. those that ended in a win or a loss), and multiplying by 100.

Team	Pld	W	L	D	Pts	Fin	%Fin
Yorkshire	28	16	0	12	16	16	100.00
Lancashire	28	15	2	11	13	17	76.47
Kent	22	8	4	10	4	12	33.33
Sussex	24	4	2	18	2	6	33.33
Nottinghamshire	18	7	4	7	3	11	27.27
Warwickshire	18	3	2	13	1	5	20.00
Gloucestershire	22	9	7	6	2	16	12.50
Middlesex	22	9	7	6	2	16	12.50
Surrey	28	9	7	12	2	16	12.50
Essex	22	4	6	12	–2	10	–20.00
Somerset	16	4	11	1	–7	15	–46.67
Worcestershire	22	3	10	9	–7	13	–53.85
Derbyshire	18	2	7	9	–5	9	–55.56
Leicestershire	22	3	11	8	–8	14	–57.14
Hampshire	22	0	16	6	–16	16	–100.00
Source: CricketArchive

== Records ==
Most runs
Aggregate	Average	Player	County
2,563	85.43	K. S. Ranjitsinhji	Sussex
1,880	58.75	Bobby Abel	Surrey
1,850	50.00	Tom Hayward	Surrey
1,830	63.10	C. B. Fry	Sussex
1,733	44.43	Gilbert Jessop	Gloucestershire

Most wickets
Aggregate	Average	Player	County
206	12.29	Wilfred Rhodes	Yorkshire
154	19.85	Albert Trott	Middlesex
145	14.16	Schofield Haigh	Yorkshire
122	15.45	Walter Mead	Essex
120	17.45	Johnny Briggs	Lancashire
