= James Humphreys =

James Humphreys may refer to:

- James Humphreys (printer) (1748–1810), American-born publisher & politician
- James Humphreys (lawyer) (c. 1768–1830), British lawyer, writer and law reformer
- James Humphreys (pornographer) (1930–2003), British operator of adult book shops and strip clubs
- James E. Humphreys (1939–2020), American mathematician
- James Humphreys (author) (born 1967), British political strategist and fiction writer
- Jimmy Humphreys (1894–1956), Irish hurler

== See also ==
- James Humphrey (disambiguation)
- Jimmie Humphries (1890–1971), American baseball player
