= Richard Humphrey (cricketer, born 1848) =

English cricketer (1848–1906)

Richard Humphrey (12 December 1848 – 24 February 1906) was an English first-class cricketer active 1870–81 who played for Surrey and numerous occasional teams as a right-handed batsman. He was born in Mitcham as the youngest of four brothers who all played first-class cricket: John, Thomas and William Humphrey being his elder brothers. He made 194 first-class appearances, including 145 for Surrey, scoring 5,614 runs with a highest score of 116* against Kent in 1871, his sole first-class century. As a fielder, he held 106 catches. He was a specialist batsman and there is no record of him ever bowling. Humphrey toured Australia with W. G. Grace's team in 1873–74 but the matches on that tour were all of second-class or minor standard.

Humphrey was a plumber for much of his working life. He also ran businesses as a tobacconist and as a sports outfitter. He held two cricket coaching positions after his playing career ended, first at Clifton College and latterly at Bedford Grammar School. He was prone to epilepsy and was hospitalised April 1891 in Bristol after one attack.

Humphrey drowned in February 1906 in mysterious circumstances. His body was recovered from the River Thames at Westminster. It is believed that he succumbed to mental illness having been reduced to poor circumstances. He was buried in St Pancras Cemetery, East Finchley, on 28 February 1906.
