= Frank Silcock (cricketer) =

English cricketer

Personal information
- Full name: Frank Silcock
- Born: 2 August 1838; Sawbridgeworth, Hertfordshire, England
- Died: 26 May 1897 (aged 58); Marden Ash, Essex, England
- Height: 5 ft 10 in (1.78 m)
- Batting: Right-handed
- Bowling: Right-arm roundarm fast-medium

Career statistics
Competition	First-class
Matches	41
Runs scored	776
Batting average	11.41
100s/50s	–/1
Top score	66
Balls bowled	4,532
Wickets	79
Bowling average	20.63
5 wickets in innings	5
10 wickets in match	–
Best bowling	7/132
Catches/stumpings	31/–
- Source: Cricinfo, 31 March 2019

Frank Silcock (2 October 1838 – 26 May 1897) was an English first-class cricketer and a founding member of Essex County Cricket Club. Debuting in first-class cricket in 1864, Silcock made 41 appearances in first-class cricket from 1864–1879, scoring 776 runs and taking 79 wickets. Regarded as one of the best professionals of his time to play for Essex, he was instrumental in the foundation of Essex County Cricket Club in 1876 and played for the county until 1887. He later stood as an umpire in first-class matches between 1889–1892.

== Cricket career ==
Silcock was born at Sawbridgeworth and grew up in Chipping Ongar, Essex. He began playing cricket at the age of seventeen and was originally a saddler by profession. Playing as an all-rounder, he made his debut in first-class cricket for a United England Eleven (UEE) against an All England Eleven (AEE) at Lord's in 1864. He was employed as a cricket coach by several notable public schools, starting with Uppingham in 1864. In April and May 1865, he was employed by Felsted School, while from June–August of the same year he was coaching the officers of the Colchester Garrison.

Three years later he appeared twice for England against the Marylebone Cricket Club and a combined Surrey and Middlesex cricket team, as well as appearing for the Players in two Gentlemen v Players fixtures, and for the Players of the South against the Gentlemen of the South. He took 16 wickets with his right-arm roundarm fast-medium bowling at an average of 17.43, including taking what would be career best first-class figures when he took 7 for 132 against the Gentlemen at The Oval. He featured in six first-class matches in 1869, taking a further 15 wickets at 22.86. In that same year he was employed by Eton, while the following year he was the professional at Thorndon Hall with William Petre. He had been an inn-keeper at the Chequers Inn in Maldon for sometime prior to 1869, having given that up in 1869. Silcock played eight further first-class matches in 1870, featuring mostly for the United South of England Eleven and various Players' teams and taking a further 14 wickets at 27.35.

He featured just once in 1871, appearing for the Players of the South against the Gentlemen of the South, taking 5 for 56 in the Gentlemen's first-innings. He had returned to Eton to coach in 1871, a position he held until 1874. He played in five first-class matches in 1872, taking 12 wickets at 14.83, before making just one appearance in 1873 in the Gentlemen of the South v Gentlemen of the North fixture, during which he made his highest first-class batting score, with 66 opening the batting in the Players' first-innings. He made five first-class appearances in 1874, taking 9 wickets at 15.55, following this up in 1875 with a further five appearances and 6 at 13.66; Silcock took all six of his wickets in one match, against the North at Tunbridge Wells. His last major season of first-class cricket came the following year in 1876, when he made three appearances, taking a single wicket.

== Formation of Essex County Cricket Club ==
Silcock had played for Essex in minor matches since 1860, during which time he was considered one of the finest professionals to play for the county. He was a founding member of Essex County Cricket Club in 1876 and captained the Players of Essex against the Gentlemen of Essex in a match to celebrate the occasion at Brentwood. The year prior to the formation of the county club, Silcock was keeping a cricket warehouse at Chipping Ongar.

A benefit match played on his behalf was held in 1878, when a United South of England Eleven captained by W. G. Grace played Essex. In 1879, Silcock appeared in his 41st and final first-class match, playing for a London United Eleven against the United North of England Eleven at Birmingham. Across his 41 first-class matches, he scored 776 runs at a batting average of 11.41, while with the ball he took 79 wickets at 20.63 apiece. He continued to play for Essex until 1887, seven years prior to its elevation to first-class status. He took up umpiring in first-class matches in 1889, standing in 36 matches until 1892, including the earliest matches of the nascent County Championship.

He died at Marden Ash in May 1897. His cousin, Joseph Silcock, also played for Essex as a professional, but did not feature in first-class matches.
