= Humfrey =

Humfrey is a given name and surname. Notable people with the name include:

== Given name ==
- Humfrey Malins (born 1945), British Conservative politician
- Humfry Payne (1902–1936), English archaeologist

== Surname ==
- Chris Humfrey, Australian zoologist and television personality
- Pelham Humfrey (1647–1674), English Restoration composer
- William Humfrey (died 1579), goldsmith and Assay Master to Queen Elizabeth I of England

== See also ==
- Humphery, surname
- Humphrey, given name and surname
- Humphry, given name and surname
