= List of people from Aldershot =

Notable people from Aldershot include:

== A ==
- Holly Aird - actress
- John Antrobus - playwright and script writer
- Claude Auchinleck - Field Marshal

== B ==
- Peter Baldwin - Australian politician
- Joan Bates - model and self-styled 'Princess Joan of Sealand'
- Kelly Bell - glamour model
- John Belling - cytogeneticist
- Graham Benstead - footballer
- Amelle Berrabah - Sugababes musician
- Johnny Berry - footballer and 'Busby Babe'
- Noel Brett - cricketer
- Oliver Brotherhood (Mumbo Jumbo) -YouTuber
- Jason "J" Brown - former member of the boy band Five
- Alan Burton - footballer
- Barry Blankley- footballer

== C ==
- Dave Carter - British powerlifter
- Bob Catley - musician, singer from band Magnum
- Ronald Cavaye - classical pianist and writer
- Kathryn Cave, children's author
- Maureen Chadwick - screenwriter and dramatist
- A. Bertram Chandler - science-fiction writer
- Michael Chappell - military writer and illustrator
- Chris Chittell - actor in Emmerdale
- Hedley Churchward - scene painter and early British convert to Islam
- Denise Coffey - actress
- Francis Lyon Cohen - first Jewish chaplain in the British Army
- Alan Comfort - footballer
- Ian Crosby - cricketer

== D ==
- Georgiana Fanny Shipley Daniell - philanthropist
- Louisa Daniell - philanthropist
- Joseph Darracott - art historian and writer
- Libby Davies - Canadian politician, New Democratic Party MP for Vancouver East
- Grace Dent - columnist, broadcaster and author
- Norman "Dinky" Diamond - drummer in the 1970s with Sparks

== E ==
- Arthur English - actor
- Richard Eve - local solicitor and Grand Treasurer of the United Grand Lodge of England in 1889
- Eamon Everall - artist and educator

== F ==
- Desmond Fitzpatrick - general
- Mark Foran - footballer
- Russell Foster - professor of circadian neuroscience and Nicholas Kurti Senior Fellow at Brasenose College at the University of Oxford
- George Malcolm Fox - Inspector of Gymnasia for the British Army (1890–1897, 1900–1902)
- Martin Freeman - actor

== G ==
- Andrew Godsell - author
- Maud Gonne - Irish revolutionary; muse of William Butler Yeats
- Ernest Spiteri-Gonzi - footballer

== H ==
- David Haig - actor
- T. J. Hamblin - formerly professor of immunohaematology at the University of Southampton
- Frederick Hammersley - Major-General and first Inspector of Gymnasia in the British Army
- Terry Hands - theatre director who founded the Liverpool Everyman Theatre and ran the Royal Shakespeare Company for 13 years
- Jeremy Hardy - comedian
- Janet Henfrey - actress
- John Raymond Hobbs - pioneer in clinical immunology, protein biochemistry and bone marrow transplantation, specifically in child health
- Ann Hunt and Elizabeth Hamel - longest separated twins
- Jon Hotten - author
- Peter Howard - aviation physician
- Tom Hunter - winner of the Victoria Cross during World War II

== J ==
- Henry Jelf - cricketer and naval officer
- Sam Jepp - footballer
- Joe Jopling - footballer

== K ==
- Herminie Templeton Kavanagh - British - Irish - American writer
- Ted Keating - New Zealand politician
- Nicole Koolen - Dutch field hockey player

== L ==
- Mark Lane - cricketer and coach
- Humphrey de Verd Leigh - RAF officer and inventor
- Lisa-Jayne Lewis - Eurovision Song Contest commentator and broadcaster
- Kathleen Lindsay - novelist
- John Lloyd - Canadian politician
- Michael Lockett - soldier
- Selden Long - British fighter ace during World War I
- Constance Loseby - Victorian actress and Gilbert and Sullivan performer

== M ==
- Floyd Manderson - competed in the 1988 Summer Olympics
- Simon Mann - mercenary
- George Martin - comedian
- Craig Maskell - footballer
- Ian McEwan - novelist
- Stephen McKay - Distinguished Professor in Social Research at the University of Lincoln.
- Dan Middleton - British professional gamer, YouTuber and author. He is best known as DanTDM
- Heather Mills - former wife of Paul McCartney
- Mickie Most - record producer

== N ==
- Frank Neary - footballer
- Gordon Neilson - Scottish rugby football player and Army officer
- Nigel Neilson - actor
- James Newcome - Anglican bishop

== O ==
- Michael O'Neill - poet, academic and Head of the Department of English Studies at Durham University

== P ==
- Brian Perry - American ice hockey player
- Seamus Perry - Fellow of Balliol College, Oxford and a professor in the English Faculty at the University of Oxford since 2014.
- Sir Robert Pringle - Principal Veterinary Officer at Aldershot Command 1908 to 1910

== R ==
- Joe Ralls - footballer
- Alex Reid - MMA fighter and television personality
- Bruce Rioch - former professional footballer, now manager
- Stella Ross-Craig - botanical artist

== S ==
- John Shearman - art historian
- Randall Swingler -poet
- Edgar Sheldrake - cricketer
- Aaron Shingler - rugby union player
- Janet 'Rusty' Skuse - Britain's most tattooed woman
- Digby Smith - author and military historian
- George D. W. Smith - materials scientist
- Sydney Philip Smith - World War I flying ace
- Tim Spicer - arms dealer

== T ==
- Charles Tannock - politician
- Nanavira Thera - Buddhist monk
- Alfred Toye - recipient of the Victoria Cross
- Stephanie Twell - athlete

== W ==
- James Wade - darts player
- Brian Walsh - footballer
- Daniel Welch - racing driver
- Davie Weir - 19th-century footballer
- John White - Lord Mayor of London
- Edward Whitehead - former Royal Navy officer better known for advertising Schweppes tonic water
- Tom Whittaker - footballer and manager
- George Williams - cricketer
- Joseph Willoughby - cricketer
- Dave Winfield (footballer) - footballer

== V ==
- Charles Viner- jurist

== Y ==
- Christopher Yates - cricketer
- Peter Yates - film director and producer

== Notable animals from Aldershot ==
- Buster - war dog decorated for heroism
