= Churchward =

Churchward is a surname. Notable people with the surname include:

- George Jackson Churchward (1857–1933), chief mechanical engineer of the Great Western Railway
- Hedley Churchward (1862–1929), British painter
- James Churchward (1851–1936), British tea planter, Inventor and later, an author
- Joseph Churchward (1932–2013), Samoan New Zealander graphic designer and typesetter
