= Holy Trinity Church, Aldershot =

Church in Aldershot in Hampshire

Coordinates: 51°14′51″N 0°45′33″W

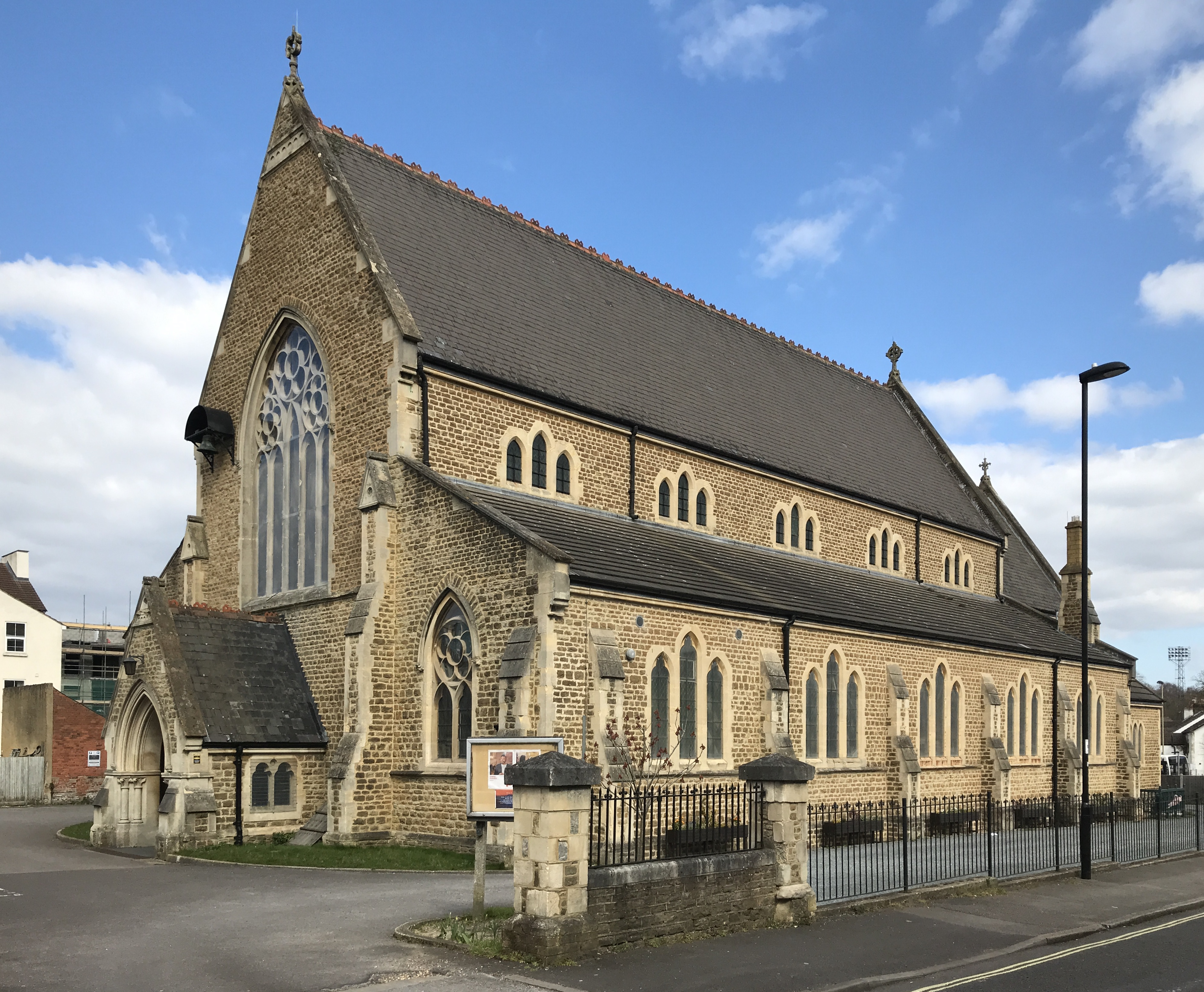
Holy Trinity Church from Albert Road in 2020

The Church of the Holy Trinity is one of four Anglican churches in Aldershot in Hampshire and is the parish church for the centre of the town being located on Victoria Road. A Grade II listed building since 1980, it comes under the Diocese of Guildford.

== History ==
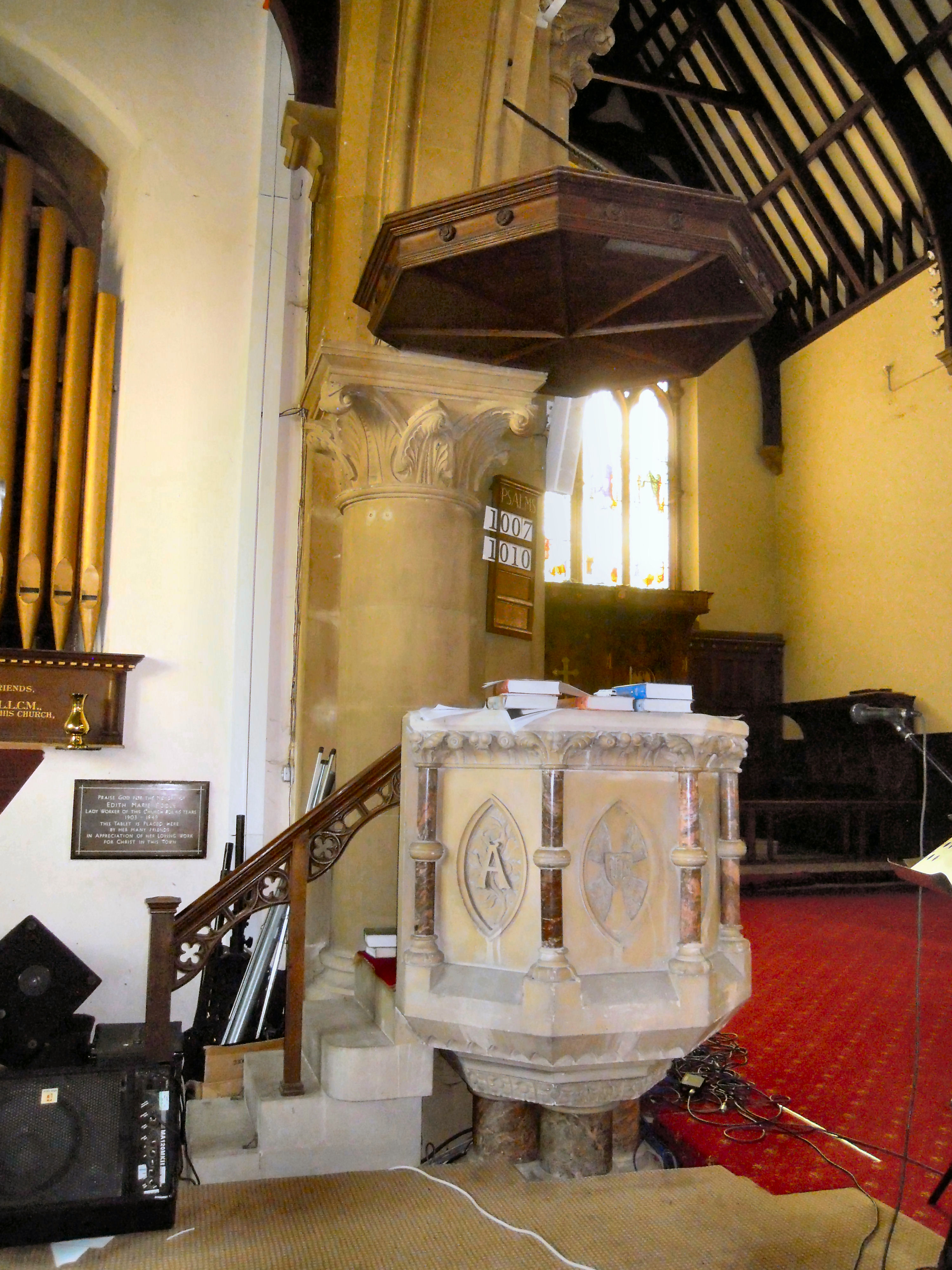
The Victorian pulpit

The parish church for Aldershot had always been St Michael's church in the centre of the historic village centre on the edge of Manor Park, but with the arrival of large numbers of troops with the British Army in the area from the 1850s onwards it was felt that a church nearer to the Camp was desirable which could also serve the needs of the residents in the rapidly growing town centre. The first new church to be built in the town, work began on building Holy Trinity in 1875 when the foundation stone was laid by Edward Harold Browne, Bishop of Winchester and was completed in 1878.

The first President of the Committee charged with raising the funds to build the church was Sir James Hope Grant. Designed by Farnham-based architect Sidney Stapley, the church consists of a chancel of two bays and a good-sized nave of five bays with clerestory together with north and south aisles and north porch of simple style and the west porch with moulded arches. The church has a steep slate roof and is constructed of brick and coursed rubble with ashlar dressings, and is designed in an adaptation of 13th-century Early English style. The building contract went to the local firm of Martin, Wells and Company, and cost £6,000, plus an additional £350 for the organ. The church could accommodate 800 people, but lack of funds meant that the tower and spire of Stapley's original design were never built.

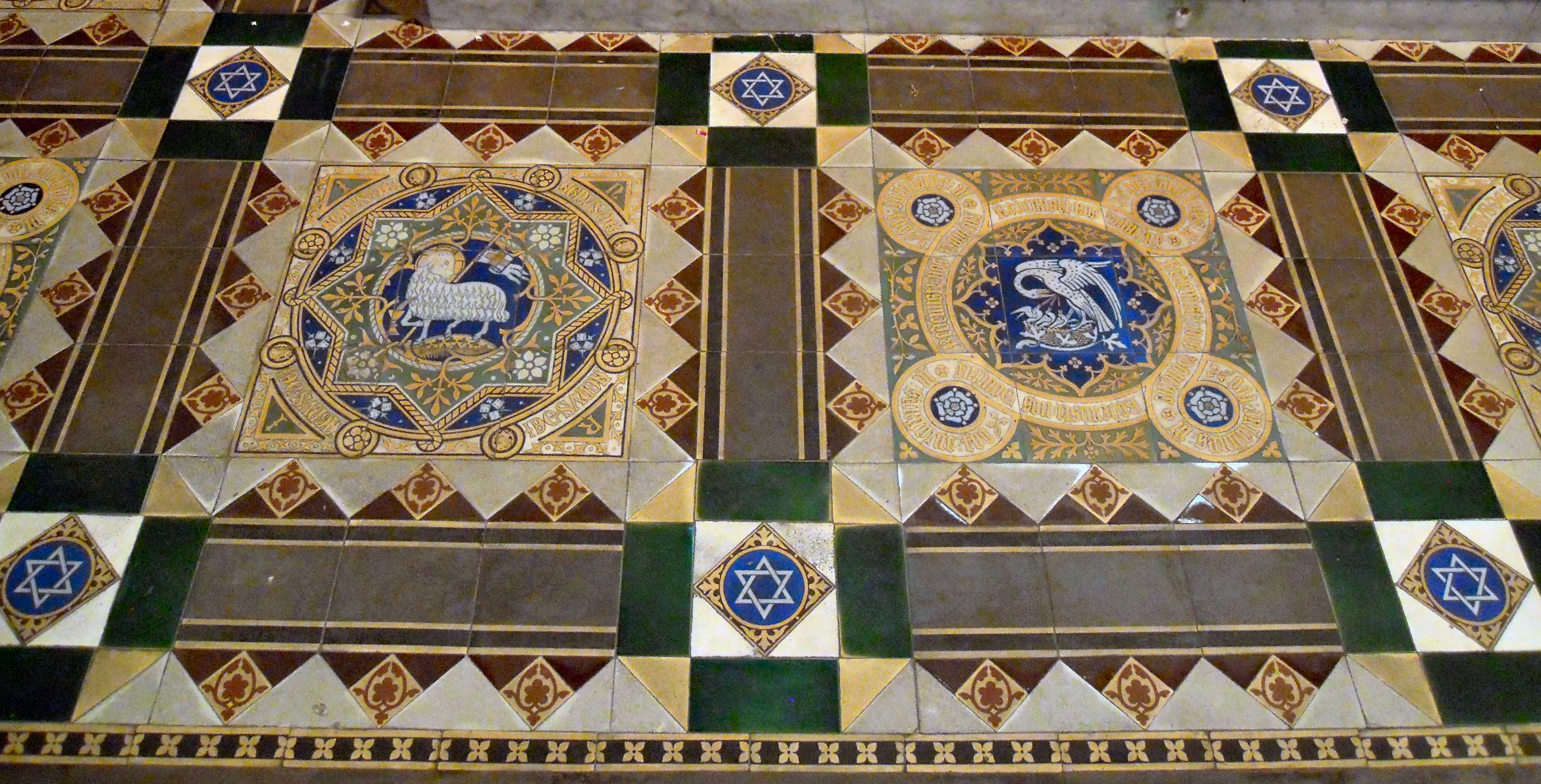
Tiles in the Sanctuary showing Masonic designs

Masonic designs are incorporated into various features of the church interior, including on the pulpit, various floor tiles and a window. The north window is Pre-Raphaelite in design and is in memory of Sarah Frances Bateman (1881–2). Created by the Ellison Glass Works, the design is attributed to Arthur Hardwick Marsh (1842–1909). The brass bookrest is a war memorial dedicated to the Anglo-Zulu War of 1879 and is inscribed TO THE GLORY OF GOD AND IN MEMORY OF THE OFFICERS AND MEN WHO FELL AT ISANDULA: JANUARY 22 1879. The parents of comedian and actor Arthur English married in the church in 1909 and he and his two older brothers were baptised there. The great west window is a memorial to 53 men of the parish who died in World War I.

Although not a military church, Holy Trinity has strong connections with the Army. During World War II it served the men of the Canadian Army Overseas, whose chaplains conducted services for the troops who were quartered in Wellington Lines, Aldershot. It became traditional for drafts who were leaving Aldershot to join the forces overseas to hold a communion service in this church before being deployed.

On the Albert Road stands the current Church hall, which replaced an earlier iron hall on the same site. The new building was named the Galpin Hall in memory of the Reverend Eric C Galpin MA, vicar of Holy Trinity from 1952 to 1966, who died a few months after taking early retirement due to ill health.

In May 1992 thieves stole the church safe containing £4,000 worth of communion plates and chalices. However, the next day two men handed it back saying it was “too hot to handle”. Two months later two men were charged with stealing the silverware.

Since 1999 the parish priest has been the Rev. Sir George Peter Howgill Newton, 4th Baronet of The Wood and Kottingham House.

In 2017 the church was put on the Heritage at Risk Register.

== Gallery ==
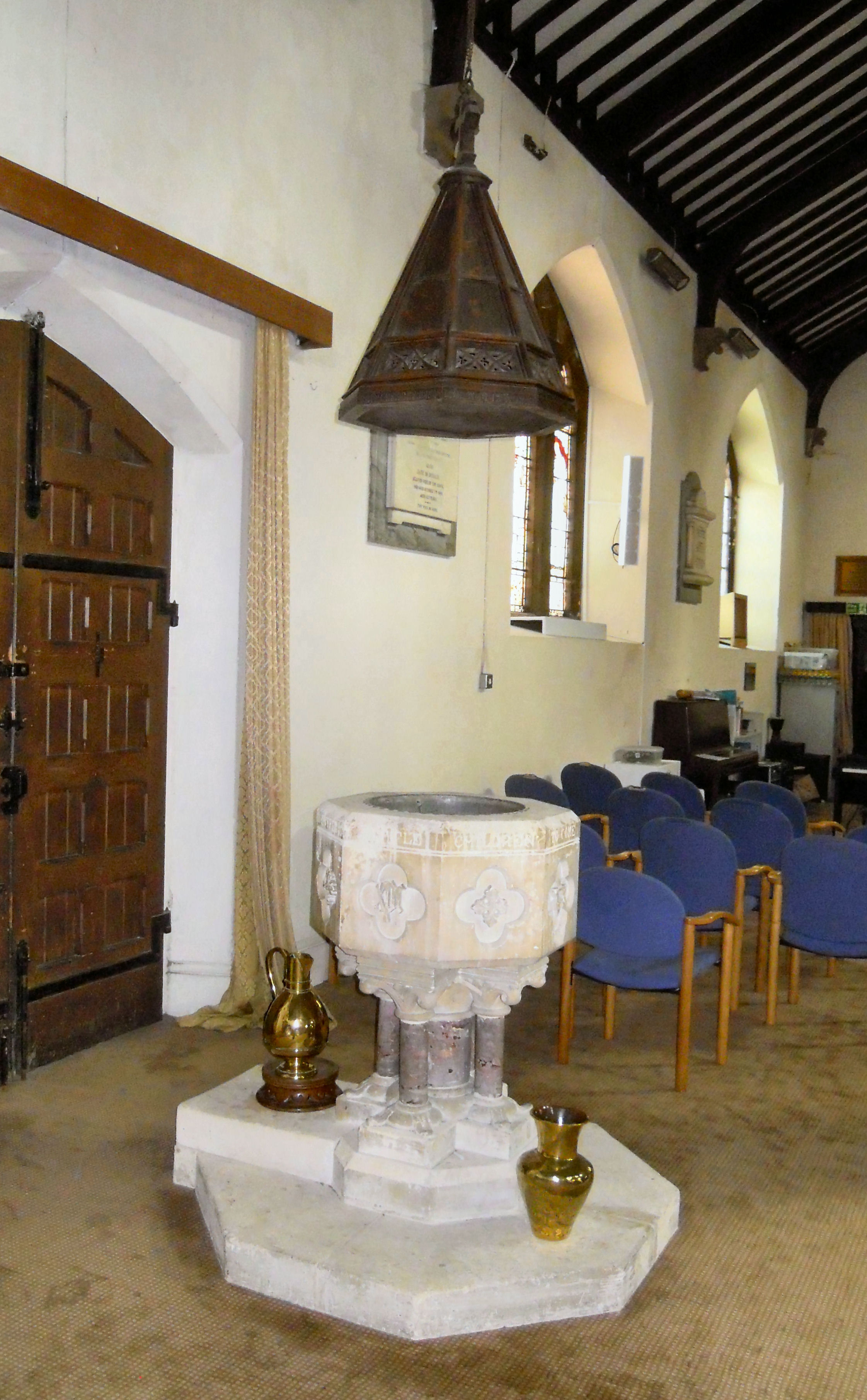
The Victorian baptismal font

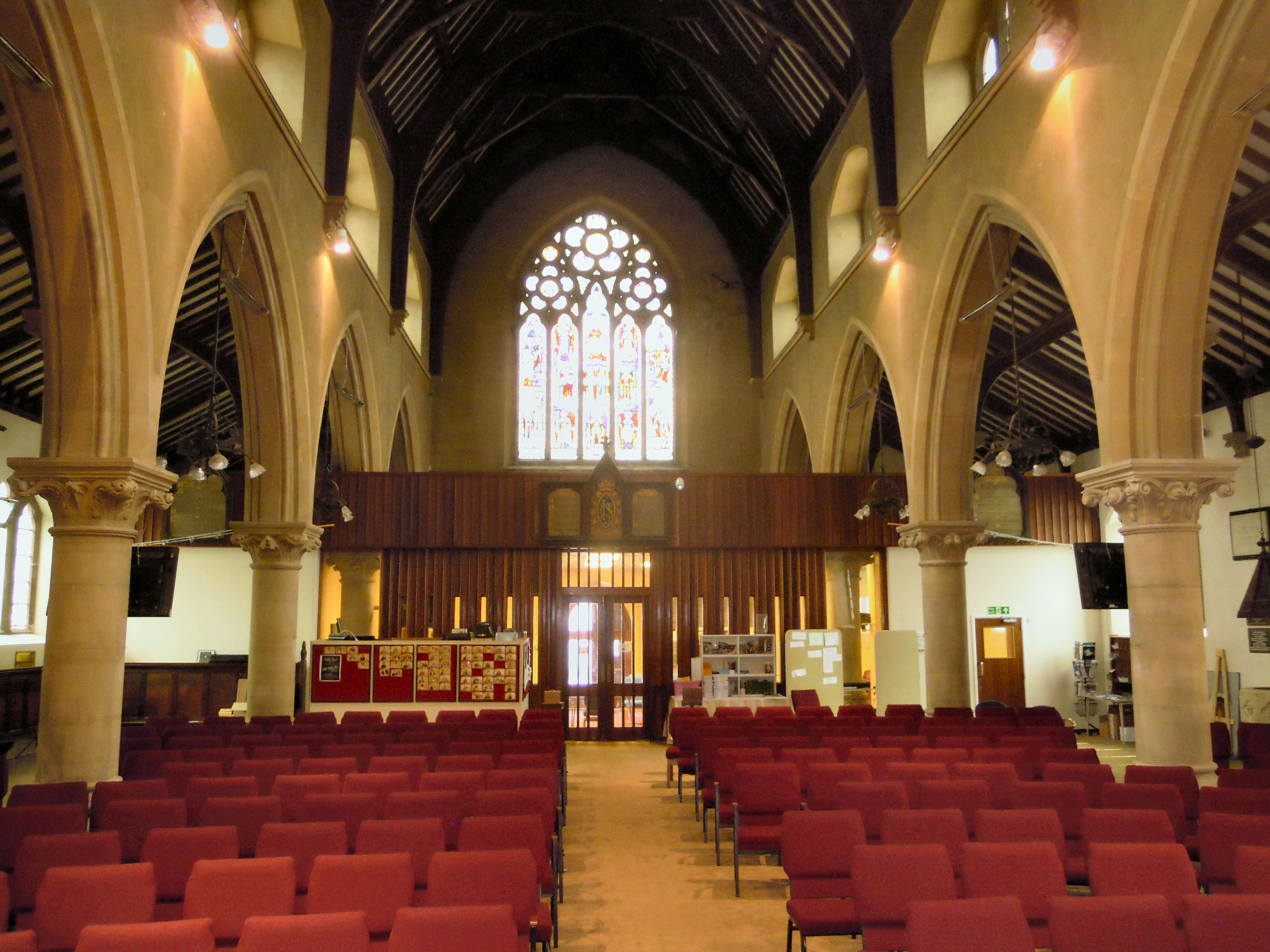
View down the nave to the West

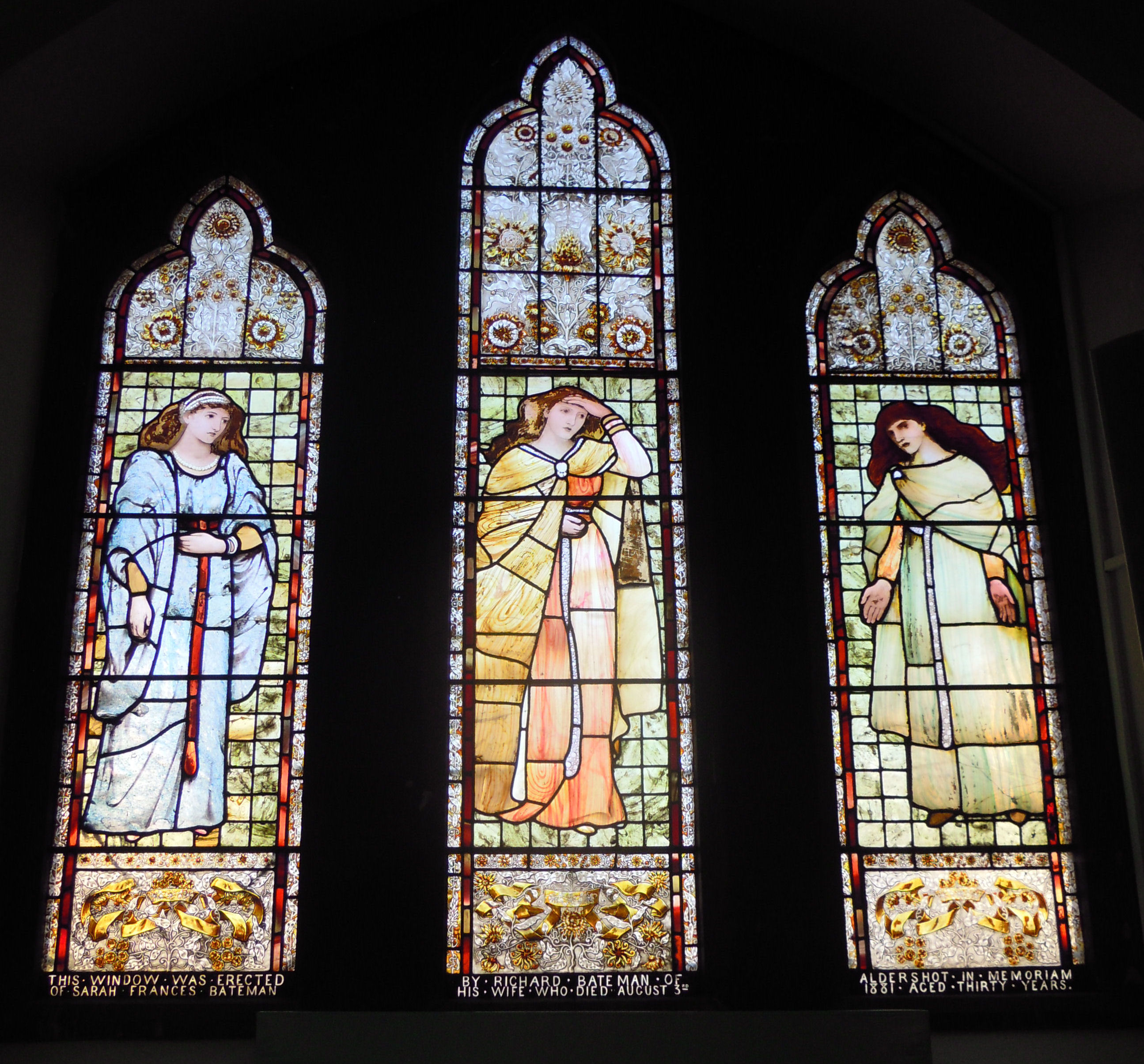
North window attributed to Arthur Hardwick Marsh

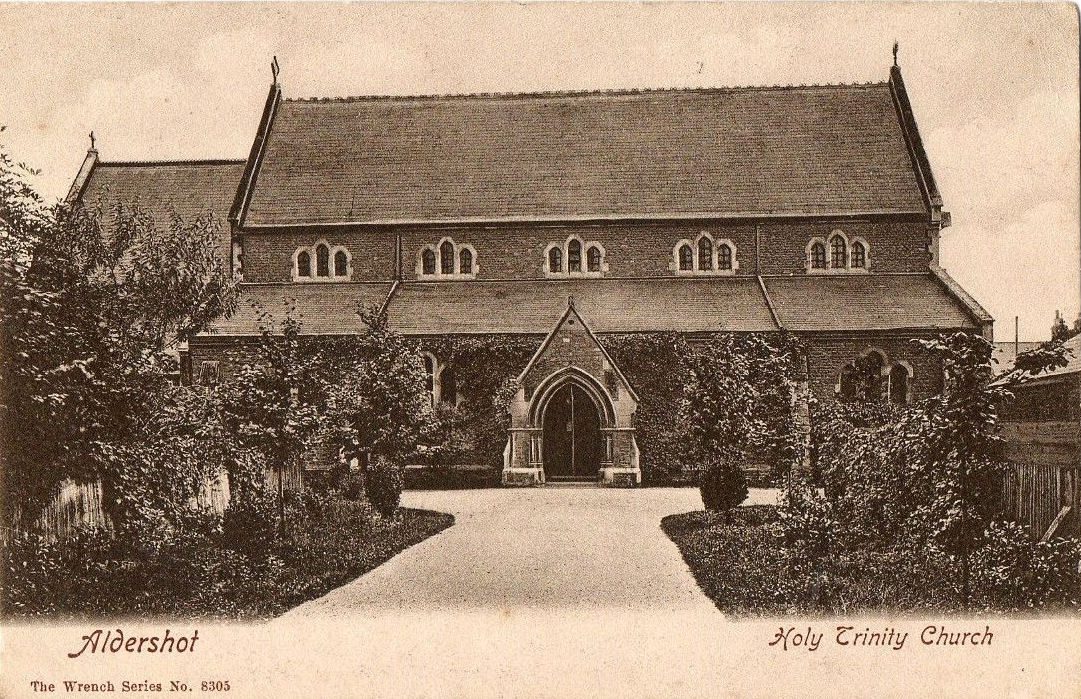
Holy Trinity from Victoria Road in 1905

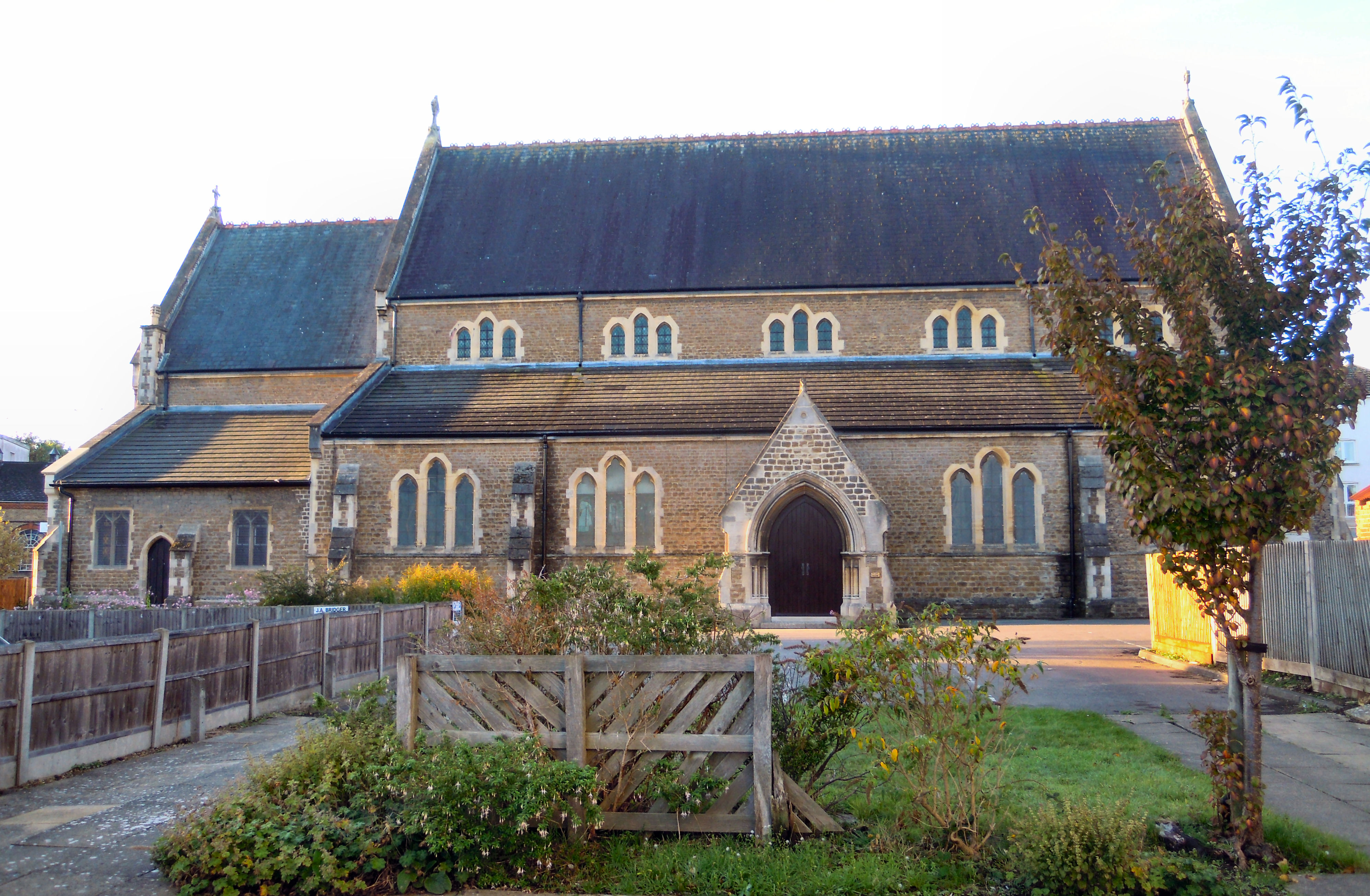
Holy Trinity from Victoria Road in 2018
