= Church of St Michael the Archangel, Aldershot =

Church in Hampshire, England

Coordinates: 51.2417°N 0.7559°W

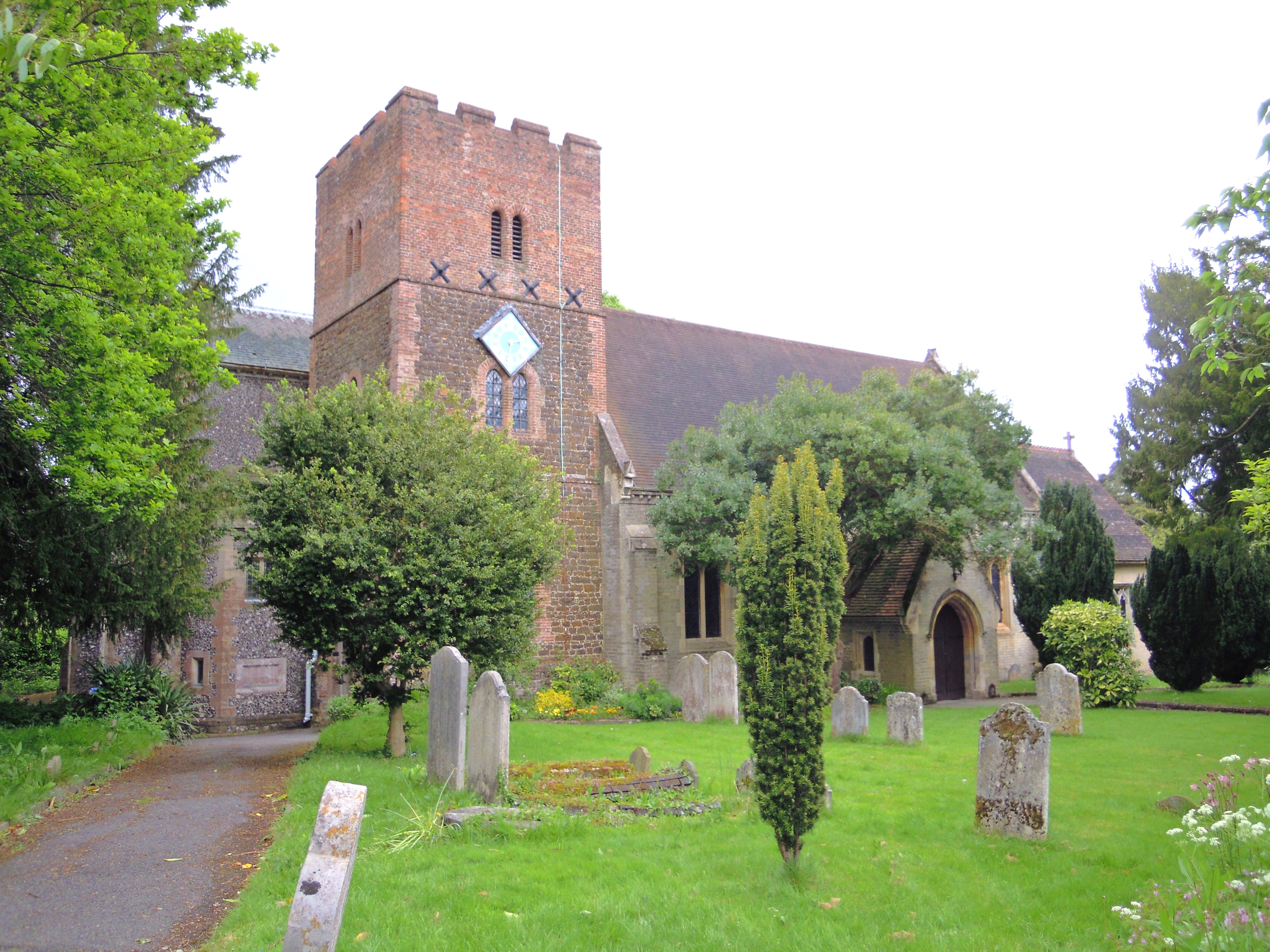
Church of St Michael the Archangel in Aldershot

The Church of St Michael the Archangel is the parish church for the town of Aldershot in Hampshire, England. Dating to the 12th century with later additions, there was almost certainly an earlier church on the site. The existing structure is a Grade II listed building and is located beside Manor Park.

== History of St Michael's ==
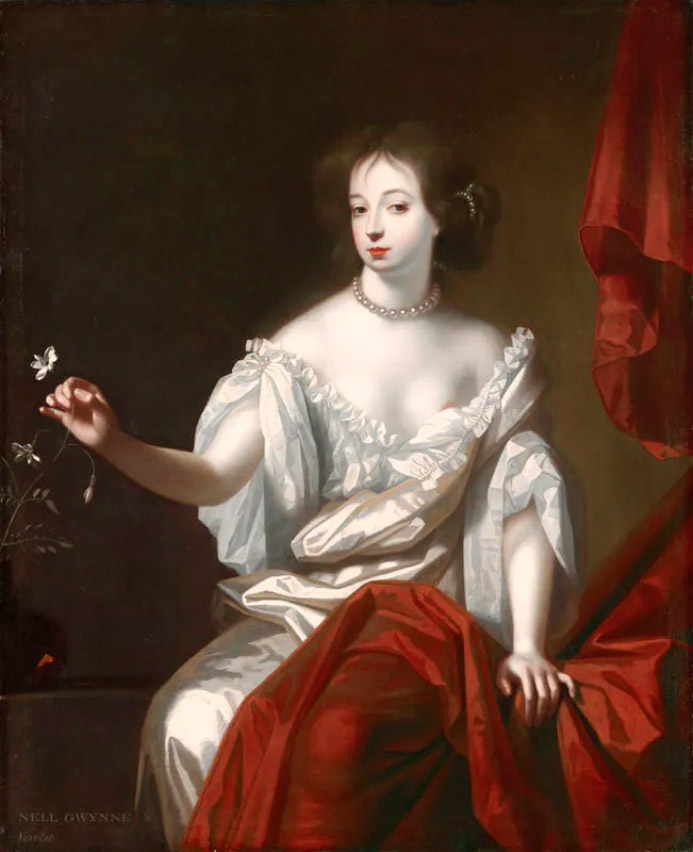
Legend says Nell Gwynn's stillborn child with Charles II is buried in the churchyard.

The land on which St Michael's now stands was personally owned by Alfred the Great and when he died he left the land to the monks of Winchester Cathedral. The church was probably built sometime around 1120.

The earliest mention of St Michael's church dates to 1121 and concerns wax for candles. The church is mentioned again in 1171 regarding an annual payment made by the parish of Aldershot to the Priory of St Swithun for the maintenance of three lights to burn continually before the High Altar there.

In 1399 the parish priest, John Bertone, was severely attacked while officiating in the church. By 1400 the church was in a state of collapse and Bishop William of Wykeham sequestrated the Rectory of Crondall to pay for the necessary repairs. However, this seems to have achieved little because the church was reportedly still in a poor condition some 80 years later. In 1481 John Awbrey pledged 'My Manor at Aldershot' for a loan from the London Charterhouse of £126 in order to restore the church. He and his wife are buried in the old chancel (now the Lady Chapel), as is Sir John White (c1500–1573), Lord Mayor of London in 1563/4.

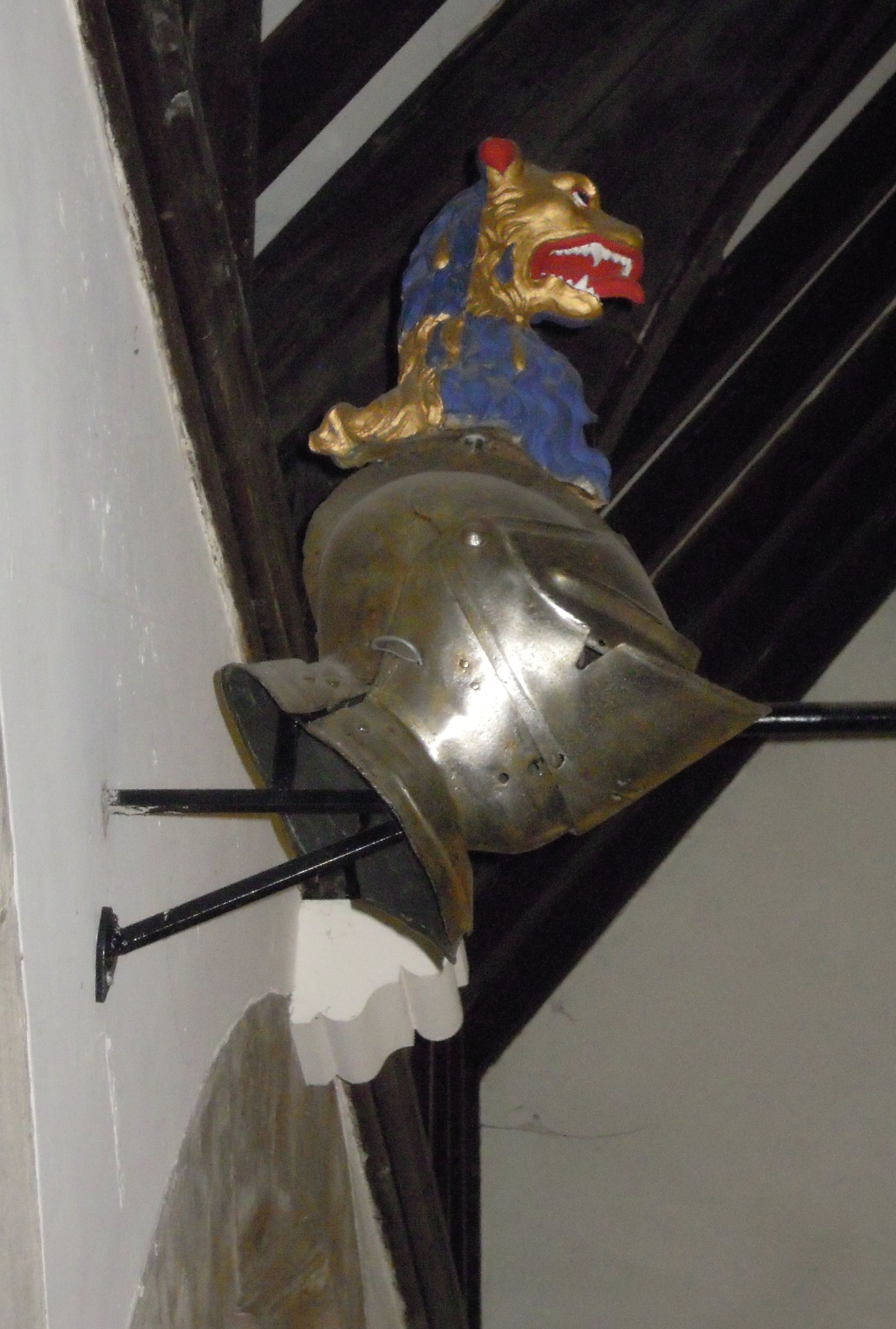
Funerary helm of Sir John White in the Lady Chapel

The registers of baptisms, marriages and burials were first begun by William Shakford in 1571, and are still in use. During the Civil War a curate of the parish, Thomas Hollinshead, was ejected in 1641. In 1645 during the same conflict, Royalist troops invaded the village of Aldershot and set fire to it but St Michael's was spared the fire and survived.

There is a local legend that, after the Restoration, Nell Gwyne, making a journey from Portsmouth to London in 1678, stopped over in the area where she gave birth to a stillborn child of Charles II, with medical help coming from 'Old Mother Squall' who lived near the church; the child was said to have been buried under a tree in the churchyard. It was claimed that for this assistance the King made an annual grant of £200 to the church, but no record of this has ever been found.

The jurist Charles Viner (1678–1756) and his wife are buried in the churchyard and have a wall memorial in the church. The clock was installed in 1799 (as well as a turret bell) and in 1801 fear of body snatching resulted in the distinctive brick-arched graves in the churchyard. The Rev John West was appointed the first 'Perpetual Curate' (1818–1820) of the parish on the nomination of the patrons John Andrews, John Eggar, John Alden, James Alden and William Tice and licensed by Brownlow North, Bishop of Winchester. West went on to become the missionary founder of the Church in Canada.

In 1855, during the Crimean War, the Army came to Aldershot, which saw a major expansion not just in the town but also in St Michael's church. During this period the nearby Holy Trinity church was built to be nearer the Camp. From 1859 to 1912 St Michael's underwent a period of development and expansion, including the addition of an aisle, the rebuilding of the nave, and a new organ.

Here in 1864 was baptised Edgar Sheldrake who went on to become a first-class cricketer. Also here Alfred Toye VC married Flora Robertson in 1918. The marriage of local actor and comedian Arthur English to dancer Teresa Mann was held at the church in 1977, and in 1995 his funeral service was held there, following which he was cremated at the Park Crematorium in Aldershot.

In the early 20th century, the parish of St Michael's set up two daughter churches: St Augustine's on Holly Road in Aldershot North Town, and St Aidan's on Kings Road in Aldershot West End. The latter has since closed and is now a private residence.

== The churchyard ==
The ancient churchyard is on land donated by John-atte-Halle in a deed dated 24 October 1409. It is approached by a lychgate donated by Mr. and Mrs. Walter Finch in 1954. In 1527 Thomas Hore, the Chaplain, had a meeting with his churchwardens and various leading parishioners to discuss fencing the churchyard in order to prevent irreverent behaviour such as May dancing and ribald talk.

Near the lychgate is an ancient yew tree which a guide to Aldershot (1859) claimed `In its prime the yew was the admiration of the whole neighbourhood and people travelled miles to see it'. Local legend has it that it was beneath this tree that the stillborn child of Nell Gwynne and Charles II was buried. Despite the fact that at least 2,000 parishioners have been buried in the churchyard since records began in 1571, and an unknown number before that date, the churchyard is not overly filled with memorials. Various 19th-century graves dating to between 1801 and 1856 have been covered with hand-made local bricks and these probably afforded some measure of protection from the activities of the 'Resurrectionists' or 'body-snatchers' who were plying their 'trade' at this time.

The North side of the churchyard was not built on and here the church building was later to be extended. However, in 1884 land in this section was given by the then Lord of the Manor for the Newcome family burial ground. In addition, with the arrival of the British Army into the area in the early 1850s, and having at that time no burial ground of its own, four soldiers were buried here. An ancient stone located near the porch was recorded in 1841, which may have been the shaft of a churchyard cross, but no trace of it remains today.

== Structure of the church ==
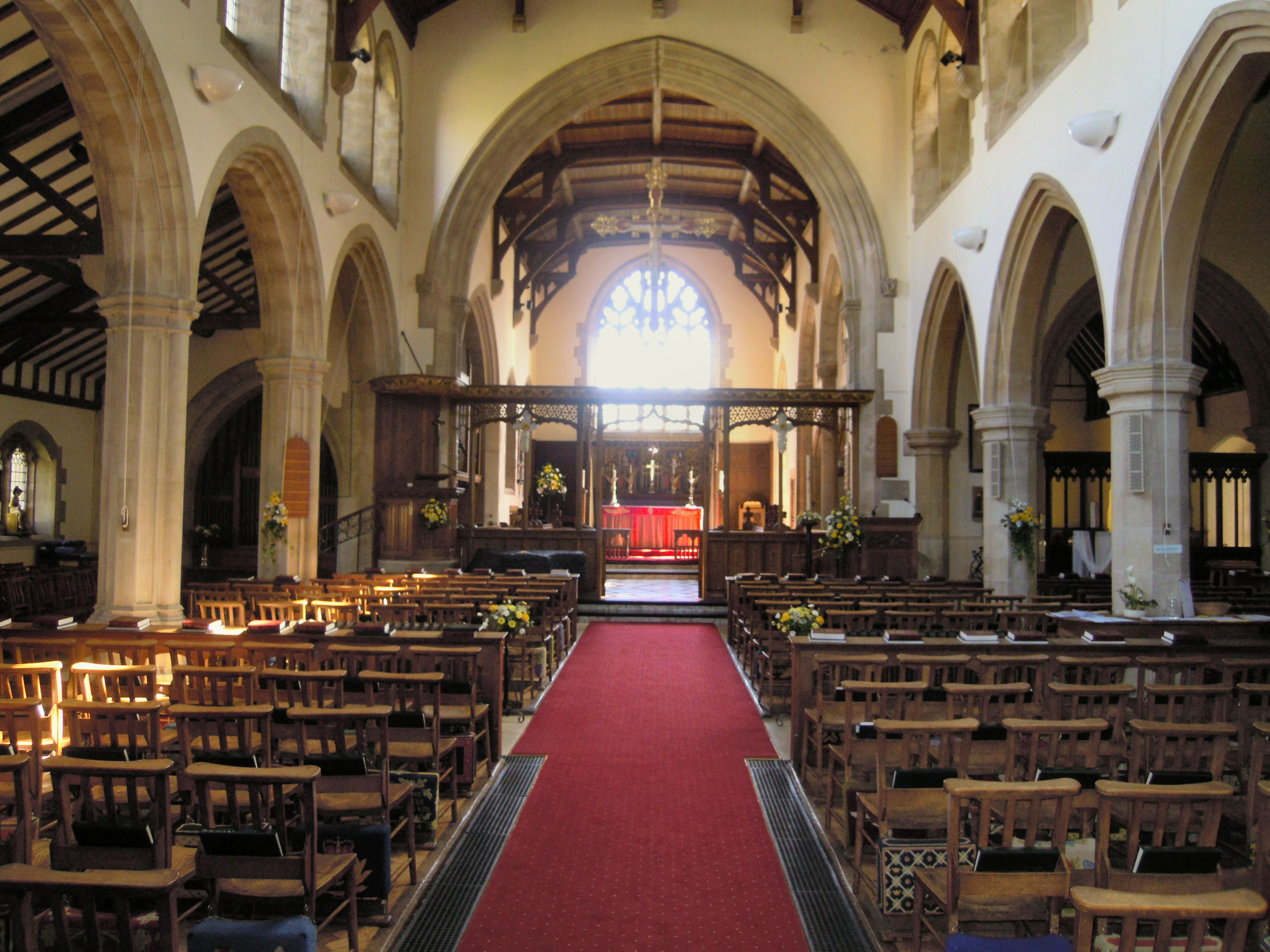
The nave looking east

The tower's foundations sit on large blocks of sarsen stone on a subsoil of London clay. During the reign of Elizabeth I the upper part of the tower was rebuilt and formed part of a chain of beacons to warn against the threatened invasion of the Spanish. It is built from local 'galleted' iron stone with mortar and flints and dressings of narrow red bricks. The tower clock was made by James Styles of Odiham and was donated by the Revd. George West in 1810. The dial was restored in 1966.

There is a chancel, a nave of five bays, north aisle, and modern south porch. With the arrival of the British Army in the area in the early 1850s the church proved to be too small for the sudden influx of residents, and the building was extended in 1859. The nave was restored and the north aisle added in 1868, so that the tower, the chancel and the Lady Chapel extension of 1380 are the only ancient parts of the original church to survive. The main door to the original church is today the one giving access to the tower. The so-called 'Lady Chapel' is in fact the original church and arches to its left were once the outer wall. In 1912 a new nave, chancel, and North arcade were added to a design by Sir Thomas Jackson, R.A.

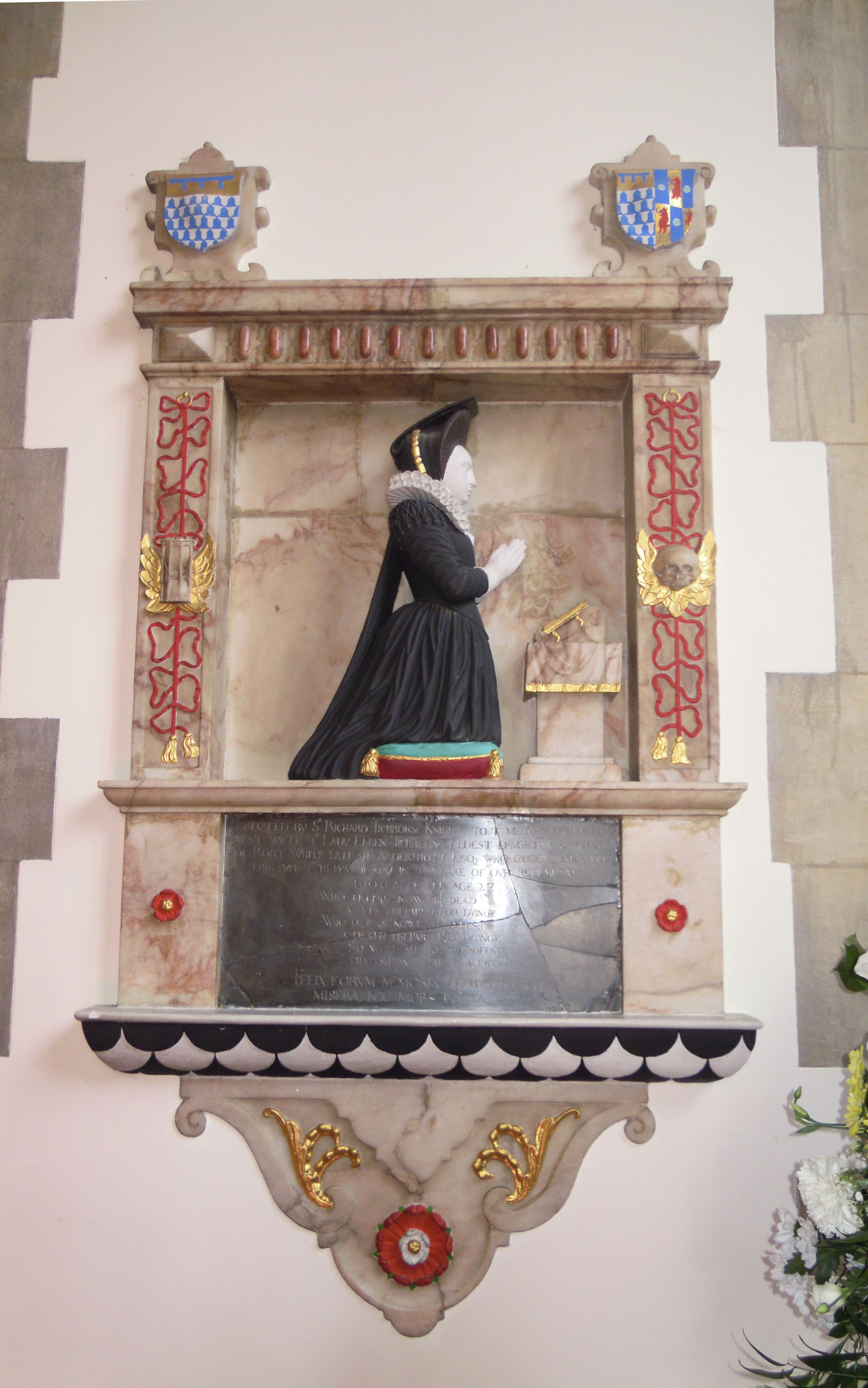
Memorial to Lady Ellen Tichborne (1589–1606) the eldest daughter of Sir Robert White and first wife of Sir Richard Tichborne

The chancel contains monuments dedicated to the local White and Tichborne Family. The wall memorial to Lady Ellen Tichborne, wife of Sir Richard Tichborne was originally in the old chancel (today the Lady Chapel) but was removed to its present position when the church was extended in the 19th century. That to her sister Lady Mary Tichborne (d.1620), the first wife of Sir Walter Tichborne, remains in its original position in the old chancel.

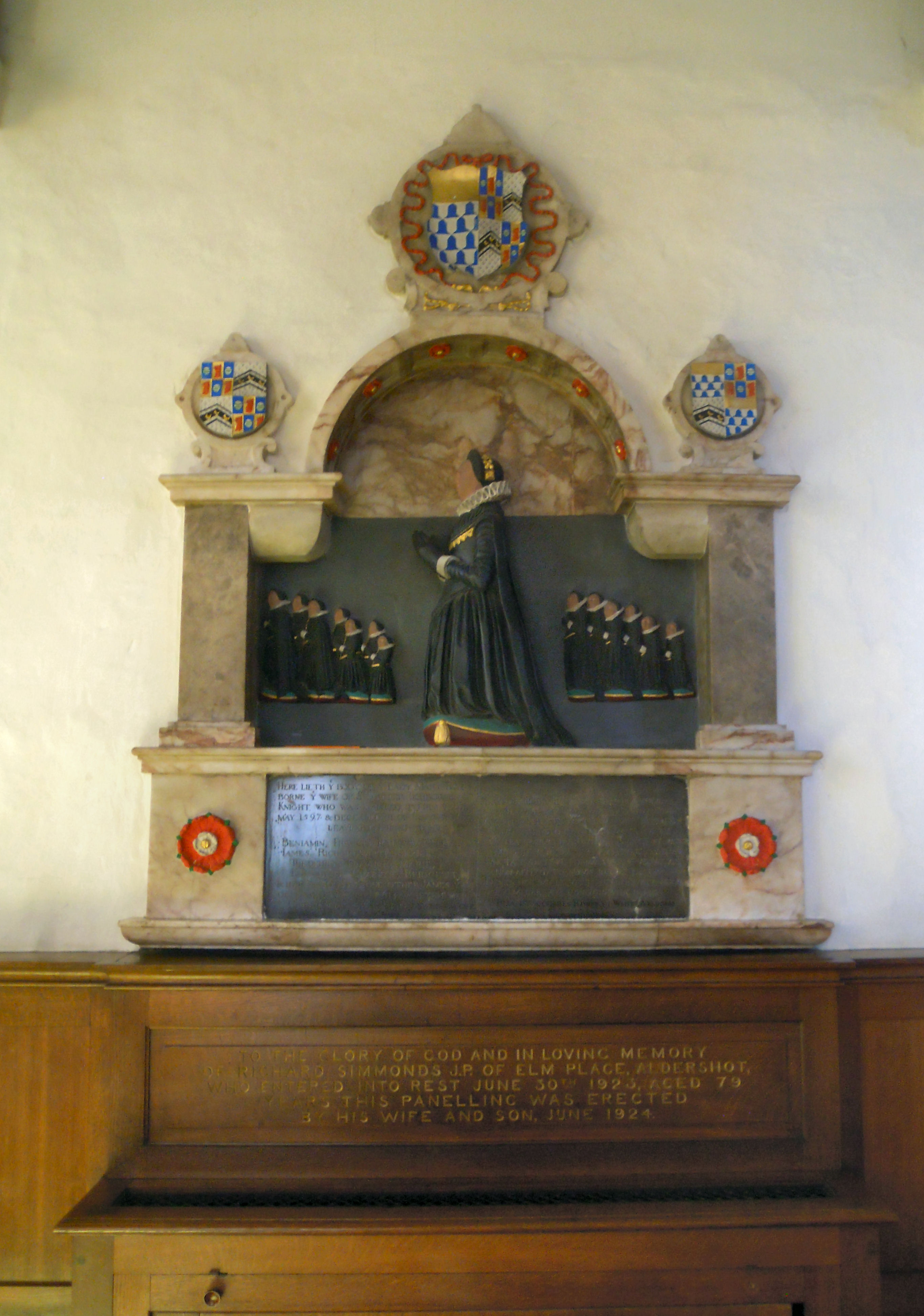
Memorial to Lady Mary Tichborne (d.1620) the younger daughter of Sir Robert White and wife of Sir Walter Tichborne

A particularly fine memorial brass to the memory of Sir John White was probably made shortly before his death as the date of his death is not inscribed on it. Lord of the Manor of Aldershot, his will of 29 May I573 states:

That there be sett in the wall, nigh that place where my bodie is buried, in the wall, the plat of Brasse with my armes and my wives with the time of my Depture to be added to the same, with the border of Allibaster stone alredie made for it together, to be sett up within a conveniet tyme after my buriall by the discretion of myne executors . . .'

White was buried at the North East corner of the old chancel beneath his funerary helm and crest. There are also stained glass windows in memory of members of the Newcome family.

== The Bells ==
The light eight were recast and rehung by John Taylor of Loughborough in early 1960. The first bell in the tower was hung in the late 14th century, with additional bells being added in 1611 and 1624. These two bells were probably given by Sir Walter Tichborne, whose son James (born 1611) was a godchild of James I who travelled to Aldershot for the christening at St Michael's church. Sir Walter's wife Mary died in 1621, and the second bell may have been a memorial to her.

When the church was enlarged in 1911 the oldest bell was recast and three other bells added, making a ring of six. After World War I two trebles were donated by soldiers in Aldershot Camp in memory of their colleagues who had been killed in that conflict, and these are known as the 'Soldier's Bells'.

== Gallery ==
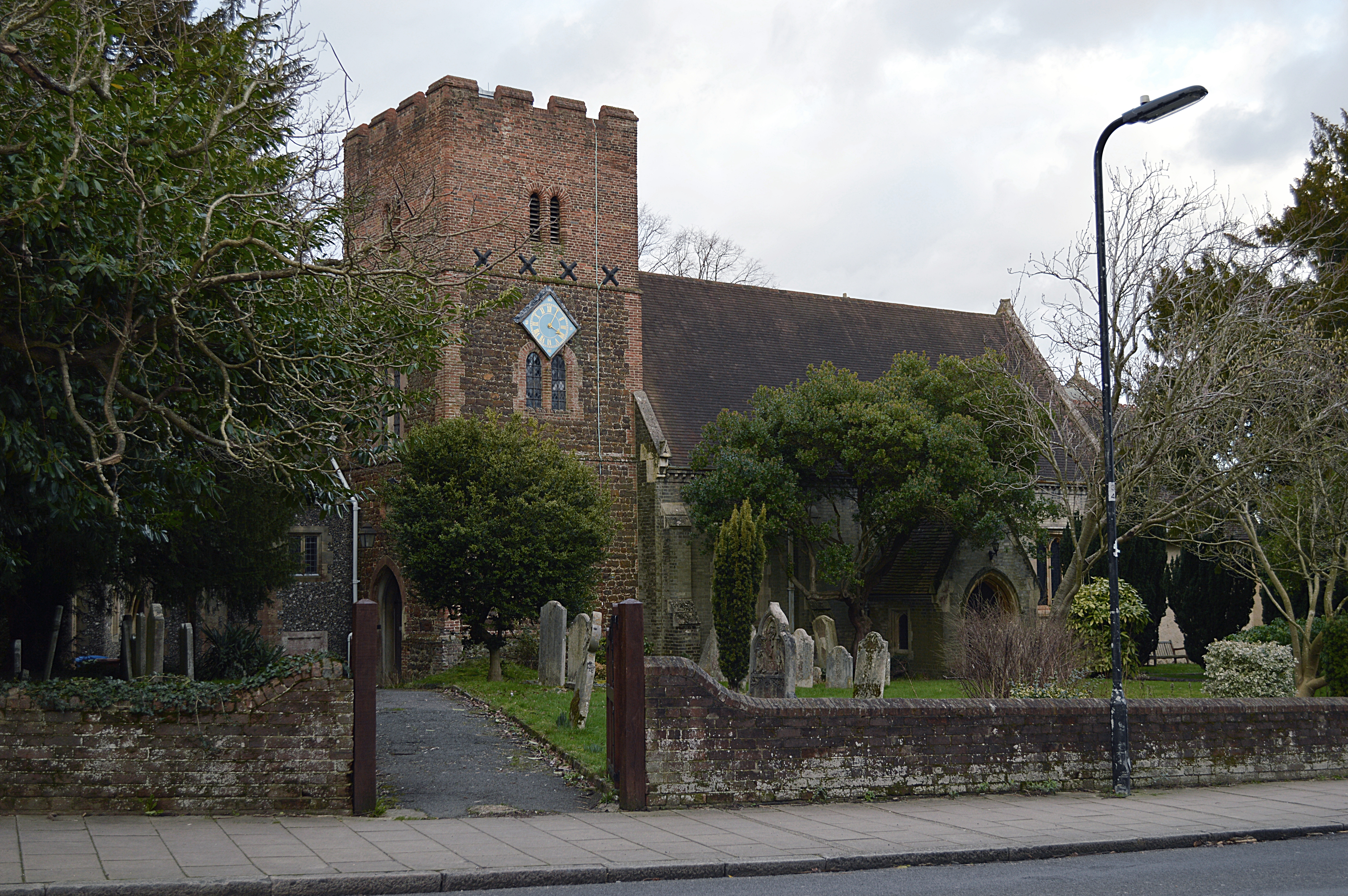
The church from the road

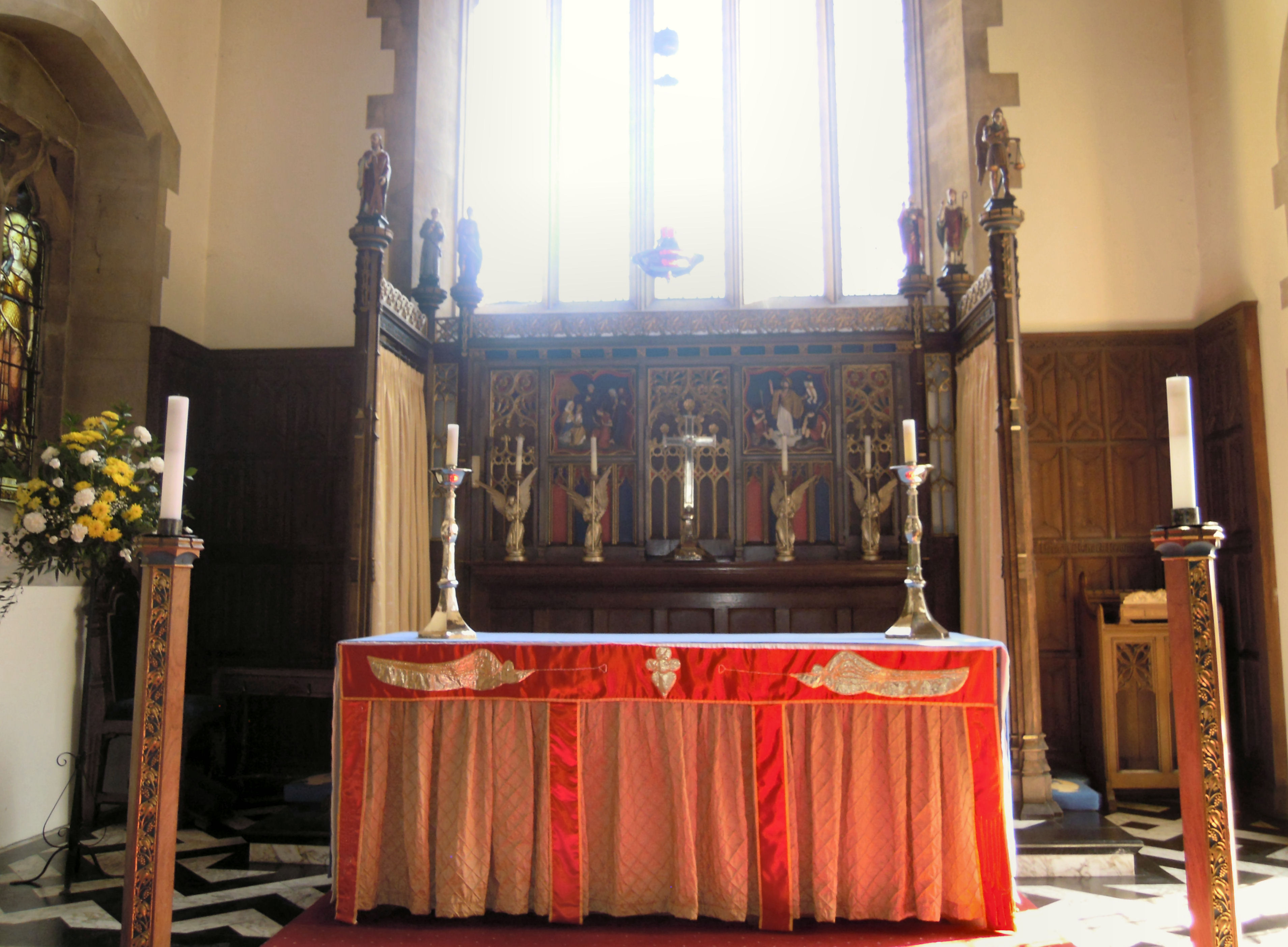
The altar in St Michael's

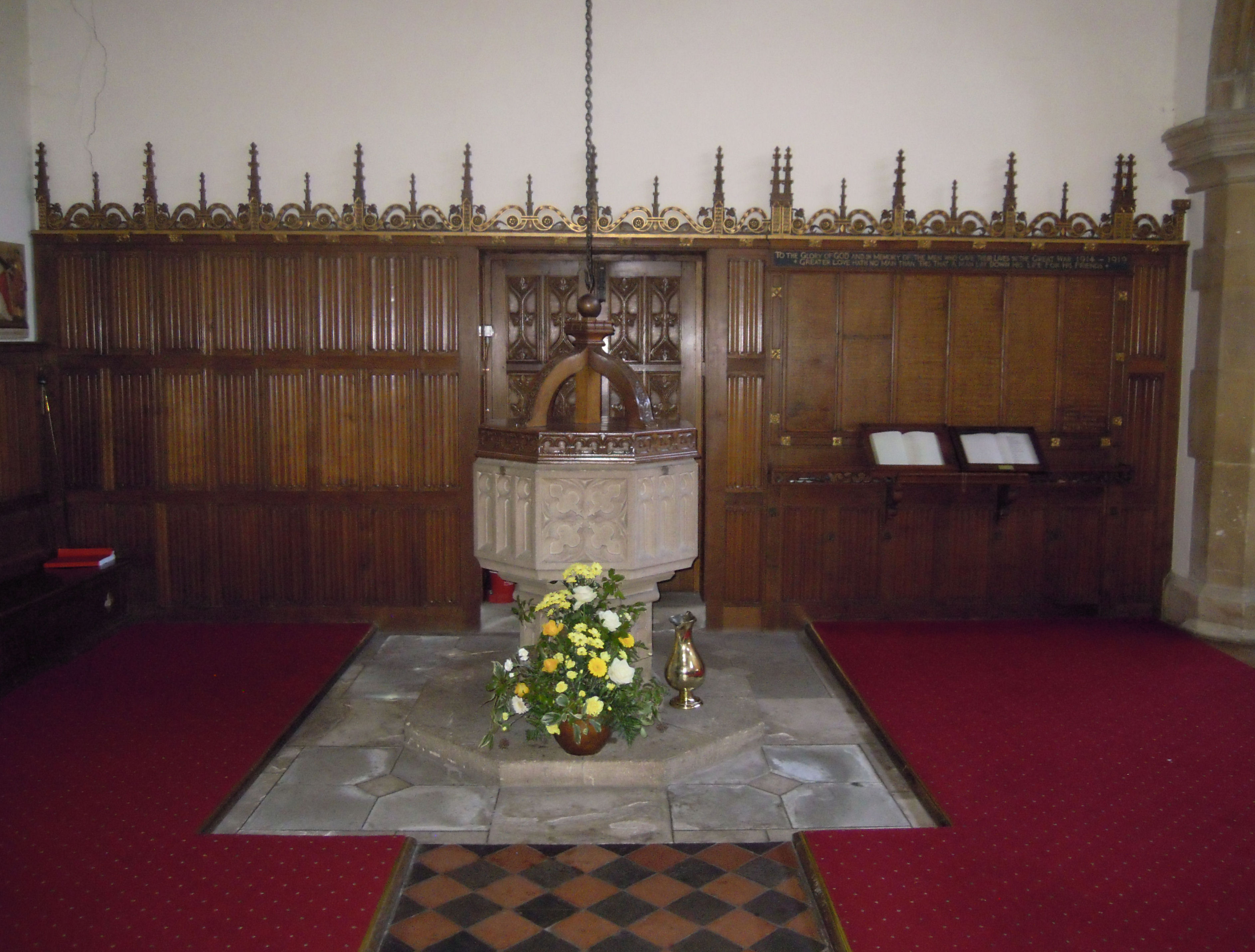
The font in St Michael's

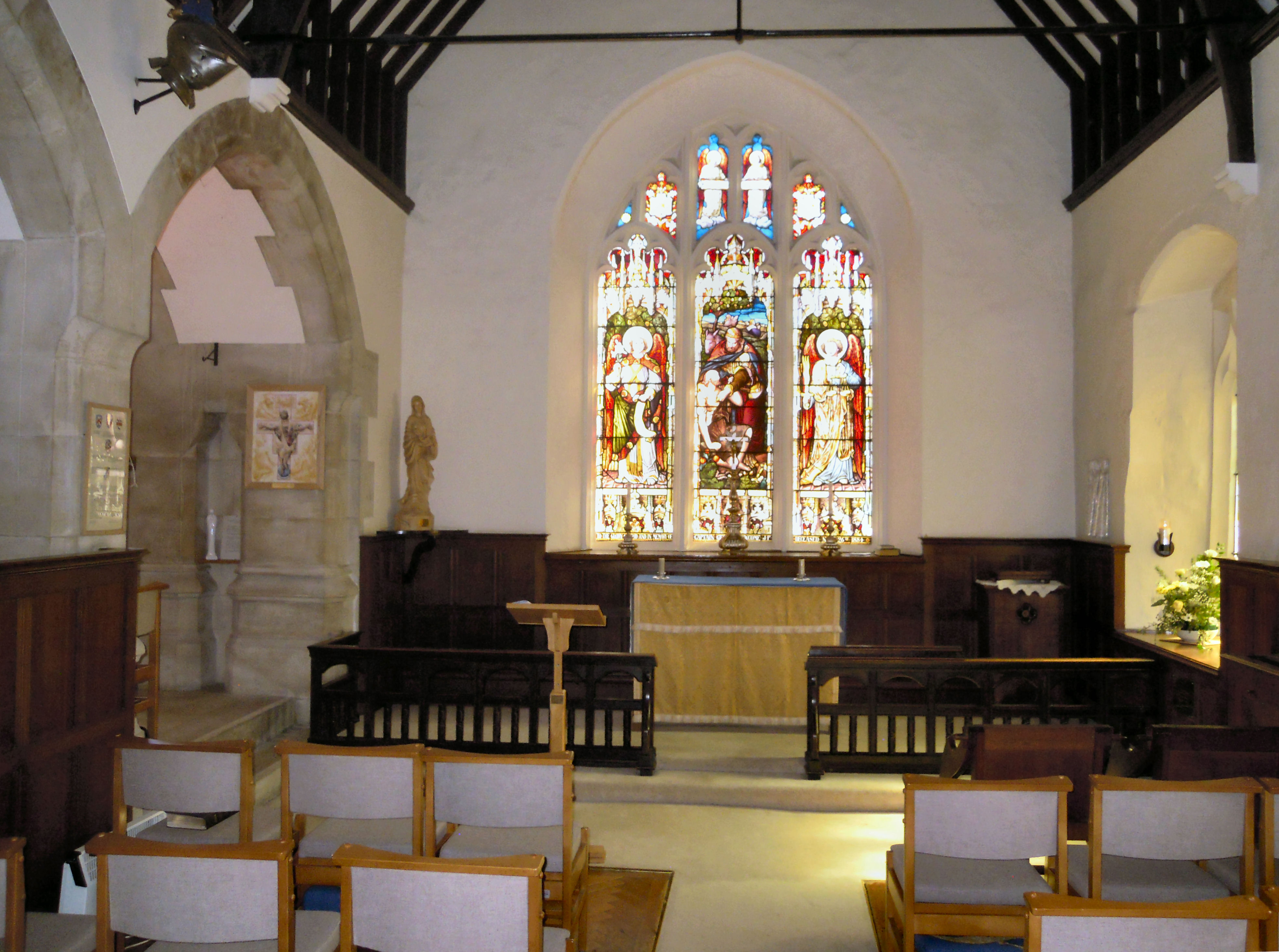
The Lady Chapel
