= Arthur Hardwick Marsh =

English painter

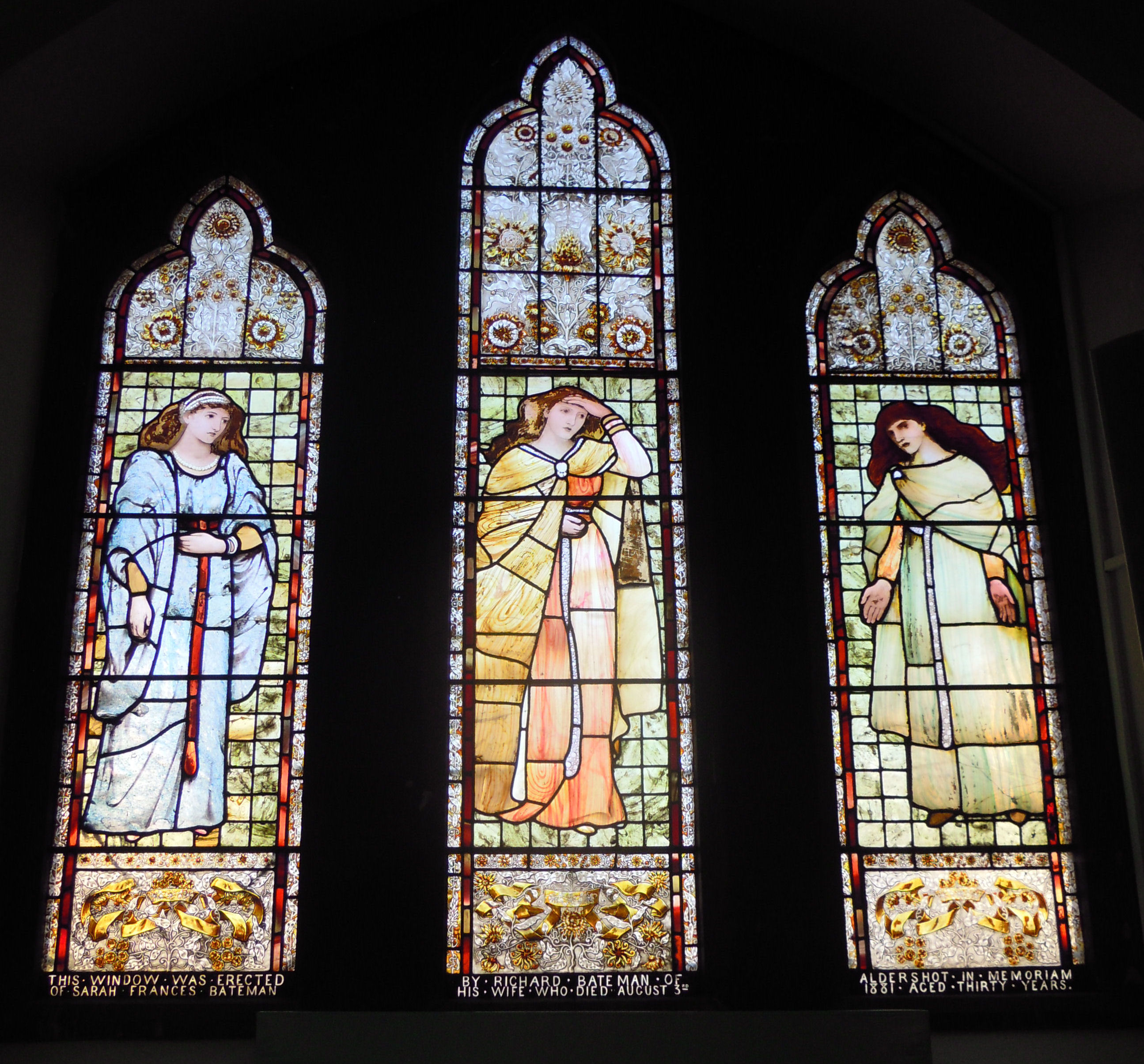
Window attributed to A. H. Marsh in Holy Trinity Church in Aldershot, Hampshire

Arthur Hardwick Marsh (27 January 1842 – 10 December 1909) was a British painter and watercolourist who flourished during the late Victorian era.

== Early life ==
Born in 1842 in Fairfield in Lancashire the son of Margaret and Edward Marsh, Arthur Marsh was a painter and watercolourist of genre scenes and landscapes.

== Career ==
He originally trained as an architect but later travelled to London where he studied art at the British Museum and the National Gallery.

Marsh exhibited in London from 1865 and was an Associate of the Society of Painters in Watercolours (ASRW) and a member of the Royal Society of British Artists (RBA). He spent a period working in Wales before settling in Newcastle upon Tyne.

His 1887 painting Lighting the Beacon shows the role of working-class women in guiding ships to shore. Other paintings include The Wayfarers (1879), The Turnip Cutter (1902), The Ploughman Homeward Plods his Weary Way, The Worker, The wreck of the Hesperus (1868), Lady Macbeth (1878) and In the Cottage Garden (1886).

A stained-glass window attributed to him is in Holy Trinity Church in Aldershot in Hampshire.

== Personal life ==
In 1860 he married Juliana Phillis Glover (1839–1878) and with her had two daughters: Margaret Hannah Phillis Marsh (1877–1931) and Phillis Clara Sylvia Marsh (1877–1965). He married Ellen Hall (1863–1942) in Newcastle upon Tyne in 1884 and with her had a further five daughters: Nellie Wellesley Marsh (1885–1964); the militant British suffragette Charlotte Marsh (1887–1961), Dorothy Hale Marsh (1890–); Margaret Marsh (1892–) and Lois Marsh (1895–1963).

Arthur Hardwick Marsh died on 10 December 1909 in Newcastle upon Tyne aged 67 and was buried in St Andrew's Cemetery there. His daughter Charlotte was imprisoned and force fed 139 times for suffragette activity during his final illness and her release to see him was delayed even though the prison authorities knew of his terminal condition. In his will he left £601, 15s, 6d to his widow.
