= John White (died 1573) =

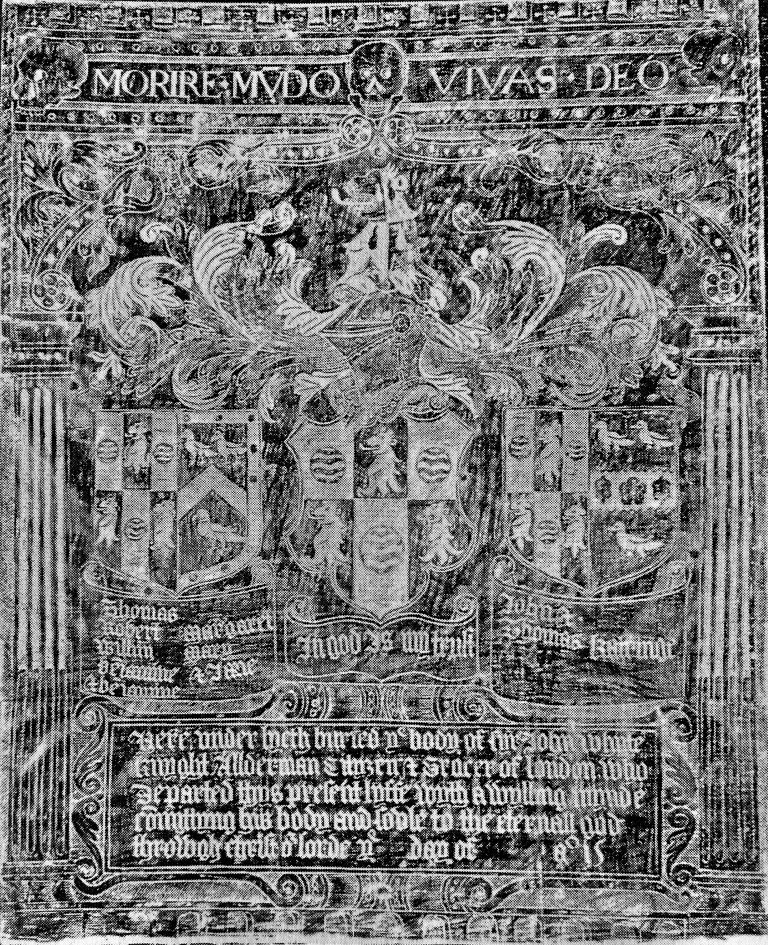
Brass memorial to Sir John White of Aldershot at the Church of St Michael in Aldershot

Sir John White or Whyte (c. 1512 – 9 June 1573) of Aldershot and London was Lord Mayor of London 1563-64. He was knighted by Elizabeth I in 1564. He lived during the reigns of Henry VIII, Edward VI, Lady Jane Grey, Mary I, and Elizabeth I.

== Early life ==
He was born in Farnham in Surrey in about 1512, the sixth of eight sons of Katherine née Wells and Robert White, one of several generations of merchants of Farnham. By 1500 the two branches of the White family held properties in nearby Aldershot as well as in Berkshire and Surrey. His eldest brother Henry White was Vice Chancellor at Oxford University and head of the Canon Law School; another elder brother was John White, the Marian Bishop of Lincoln (1554–1556) and Bishop of Winchester (1556–1559).

== Public offices ==
White held the offices of Treasurer of St Bartholomew's Hospital (1549); alderman for Cornhill and auditor for the City of London (1554); Master of the Worshipful Company of Grocers (1555-6, 1560-1); Freeman of the Worshipful Company of Merchant Taylors; Sheriff of the City of London 1556/7; Lord Mayor of London (1563/4); President, Bethlem Royal Hospital and Bridewell Hospital (1568-his death), and of Christ's Hospital; and Surveyor-General of London hospitals (1572-3).

== Career and life ==
Although his brother, Bishop John White, was a staunch Catholic and enthusiastic persecutor of Protestants under Queen Mary, Sir John White does not appear to have had any strong religious convictions as his name is listed on the pardon roll at the beginning of the reign of Queen Mary but also on that at the beginning of the reign of Elizabeth I. White was a successful merchant in the Spanish markets, and he was probably the Mr. White, merchant of London, who was recorded as being in Spain in August 1562. In 1570 White was on the panel appointed to hear the complaints of two English merchants similarly trading in Spain. However, in common with most merchants of the period, it is not likely that he restricted his activities to one market or one type of merchandise. In 1554 he and Sir Henry Hoberthorne received a licence to export 100,000 pounds of bell-metal. White lent money to the Crown and with the profits from his successful business ventures was able to build up a landed estate, adding these to the properties he had already inherited in Aldershot. In 1535 he and his relative Stephen Kirton purchased Farnham chantry built on the north side of St Andrew's Church in the town and its goods and properties from the Crown for £407 4s. He also purchased land in Devon, Kent, Surrey, Shropshire and Wiltshire.

He became Member of Parliament in 1566, when he sat in the Commons as one of the four representatives for London. He was returned again in 1571. On 31 October 1566 White was present at a conference with the House of Lords concerning Elizabeth I's marriage and the succession, while in the Parliament of 1571 he sat on four committees.

== Personal life ==
His first wife, and possibly a distant cousin, was Sybil White, daughter of Robert White of South Warnborough in Hampshire, the sister of the English politician Sir Thomas White (1507–1566). With her he had 4 sons and 3 daughters: Thomas, William, Benjamin and Robert (1545–1599), while his daughters were Mary, Jane and Margaret. In 1558 he married secondly Catherine (1530–1576), the daughter of the Spanish-born John Soday, apothecary to Queen Catherine of Aragon, and the widow firstly of Jasper Aleyn, a draper of London, and secondly of Ralph Greenway, alderman and grocer of London. Her brother John Soday II had been apothecary to Queen Mary while another brother, Richard, had been her second husband's agent in Spain. With her White had a further 2 sons and a daughter, John (1559–1645) whose godfather was his uncle Bishop John White, Thomas and Catherine.

== Death and burial ==
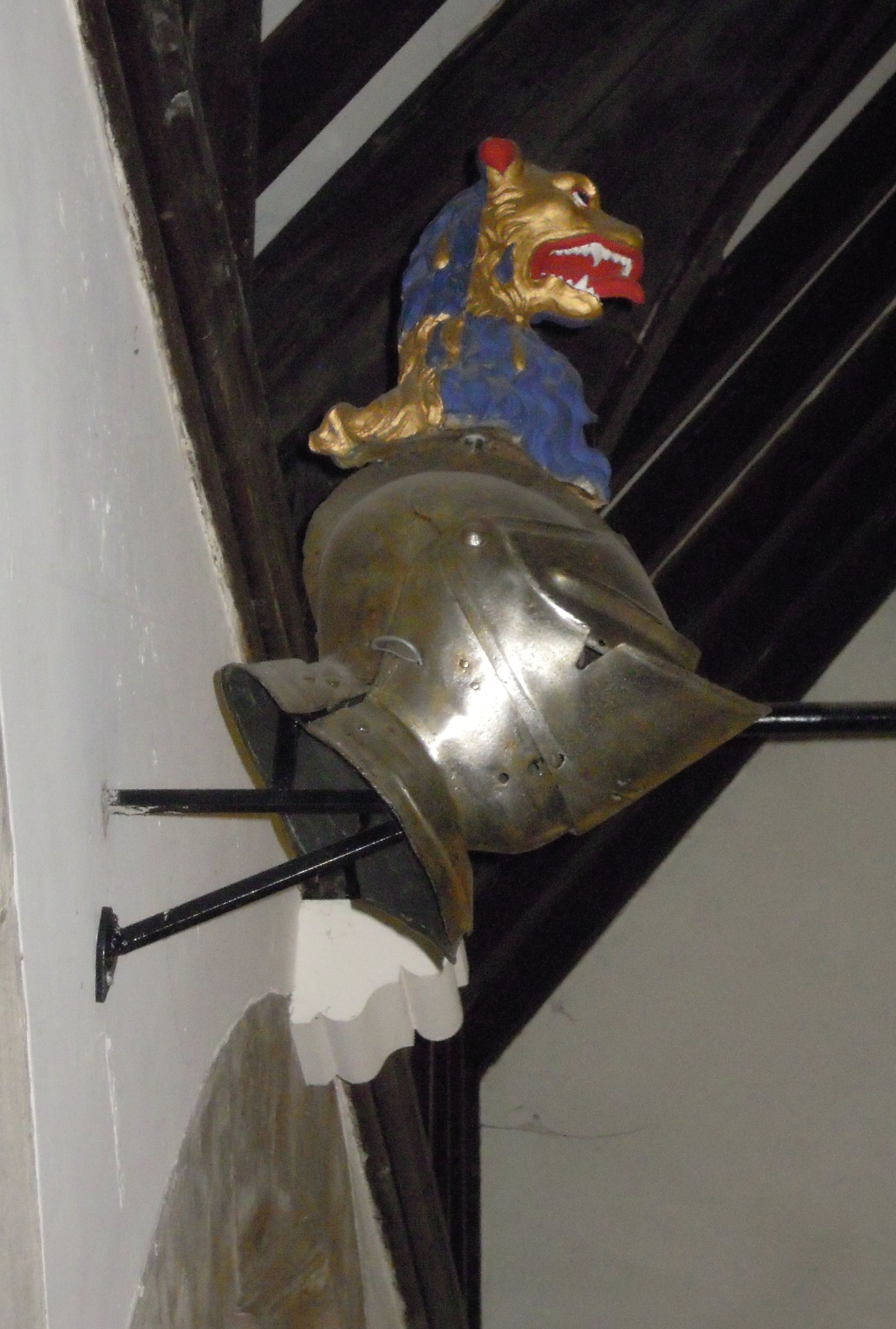
Funerary helm of Sir John White in the Lady Chapel in St Michael's Church in Aldershot

Sir John White died in London in June 1573, having made his will the previous month. In it he stipulated that, as Lord of the Manor of Aldershot, he was to be buried in St Michael's Church there where a brass memorial plaque remains to this day. His will stated:

That there be sett in the wall, nigh that place where my bodie is buried, in the wall, the plat of Brasse with my armes and my wives with the time of my Depture to be added to the same, with the border of Allibaster stone alredie made for it together, to be sett up within a conveniet tyme after my buriall by the discretion of myne executors . . .'.

A further stipulation in his will was that a ‘discreet learned man’ should preach a sermon, either at the funeral or during a holiday soon after. His goods were divided into three parts, with a third going to his wife; a third for his children as yet unprovided for, and the last third for personal bequests - including to each of his maidservants; to the poor of Aldershot and the poor of Cornhill ward; and to the prisoners in Ludgate, Newgate. He was buried in the North East corner of the old chancel at Aldershot beneath his funerary helm and crest. His estates in Aldershot passed to his son Sir Robert White.
