= Ann Hunt and Elizabeth Hamel =

Longest-separated twin siblings

- Born: (A. H.) Patricia Susan Lamb (E. H.) Elizabeth Ann Lamb; 28 February 1936; Aldershot, Hampshire, England
- Died: (A. H.) 16 December 2017 (aged 81) (E. H.) 8 November 2014 (aged 78)
- Citizenship: (A. H.) United Kingdom (E. H.) United States and United Kingdom
- Known for: The longest separated twins
- Children: (A. H.) 3 (E. H.) 2

Ann Hunt (28 February 1936 – 16 December 2017) and Elizabeth Hamel (28 February 1936 – 8 November 2014) were twin sisters who were reunited after almost 78 years apart. The period of separation is a Guinness World Record for twins. Both women were born in Aldershot, England, in 1936. Their mother could not afford to keep both of them since she was a domestic servant. Elizabeth was kept because she had curvature of the spine and her mother thought that it would be difficult for her to be adopted. Ann was adopted and raised as an only child. As an adult, Elizabeth met an American and moved to the United States. On 1 May 2014, the sisters were reunited again in Fullerton, California, United States. The women spent the next day undergoing testing at the Twin Studies Center at California State University in Fullerton, which does research into how genes and environment affect development.

== Early years ==
The fraternal twins' mother's name was Alice Alexandra Patience Lamb and their father's last name was Peters. They were born Patricia Susan Lamb (Ann Hunt) and Elizabeth Ann Lamb (Elizabeth Hamel). Their mother was unmarried and a domestic cook. Their father was in the Army and stationed in Aldershot, UK, but he never saw his daughters.

Their mother could not afford to raise both of them, so she gave Patricia Susan Lamb up for adoption when she was five months old. She was adopted by Hector and Gladys Wilson who also lived in Aldershot. They renamed her Ann Patricia Wilson. When Ann was 14, her aunt told her that she was adopted. When she asked her mother if she was adopted, her mother told Ann that she was adopted because her birth mother could not care for her and that Ann's birth mother allowed her (Gladys) to care for Ann.

== Search for the other twin ==
In 2001, Gladys died and Ann went to the register office to get a copy of her own birth certificate. She discovered that her birth mother's name was Alice Lamb and that her occupation was a domestic cook. There was, however, no information about other children, the age of her birth mother, nor the address where she lived. Ann's youngest daughter, Samantha Stacey, was interested in genealogy, so Ann asked her to look into it. It turned out to be a long process because they had so little information to work with and they assumed that Ann's birth mother Alice was very young when she had Ann, when, in fact, she had been 33. Samantha put ads in the local newspaper, searched electoral rolls and online forums. She made little headway.

In 2013, a breakthrough came. Samantha said she was exhausted doing the research and taking care of her child at the same time. Her husband asked her what he could do for her, and she asked him to find Alice's death certificate. He did, and they discovered that Alice married George Burton when she was 49; they had married in 1951 in the Parish Church of St Bridget with St Martin in Chester. They also knew that the couple married in Chester, England, and that Alice had a stepson named Albert. Albert died by this time, but they were able to track down his son, who told them, "Oh, yes, Alice has a daughter in the US." Samantha later told her mother Ann that not only did she have a sister, but that her sister was her twin. Samantha was apprehensive about telling her mother that she had a twin because her mother was the twin that was adopted; but when Samantha told her mother, she was just happy to find out that she had a sister.

== First contact ==
On 22 April 2013, Elizabeth was going through her mail when she spotted a letter (sent by Samantha) from Aldershot, UK, where she was born. When she opened it she saw that the letter began with "I am writing to you as I am searching for a family connection" and she immediately knew what it was about. She shared the letter with her two sons Quinton and Jeff. A few minutes later she called her long-lost sister Ann in the UK. After their first phone conversation Elizabeth wrote a letter to Ann to explain what had happened. Elizabeth wrote to Ann that their mother planned to have both of her twins adopted, but that when she found out that Elizabeth had curvature of the spine, which back then made her harder to adopt, she decided to keep Elizabeth. In 1936, it was difficult for an unmarried woman in domestic service to keep a child. Alice was a live-in servant and live-in servants were almost never allowed to keep any children with them. Moreover, she had the stigma of an illegitimate child, which back then could have resulted in her losing her job.

== Years of separation ==
Because of Alice's situation, Elizabeth did not live with her for a number of years. An aunt took care of Elizabeth until she was about three or four years old when her mother moved to Berkhamsted where she worked for Captain Hallam. A woman in Berkhamsted then took care of Elizabeth. Alice would visit Elizabeth every week on her half-day off, but one week she was unable to visit at her usual time because of a dinner party at the Hallam's estate. When she did arrive unexpectedly, Alice found Elizabeth dressed in rags. Alice had made many dresses for Elizabeth to wear. She immediately took Elizabeth to the Hallam's estate and they lived in the servants quarters, which occurred during World War II.

Both Alice and Elizabeth moved to London where Alice earned £2 a week with room and board. When Elizabeth was 15 her mother got married. It was at about this time that Alice told Elizabeth that she had a twin sister. She saw Ann's adoption papers but they were lost in 1980 when Alice died. At the time, Elizabeth wished that she had asked her mother more questions because her cousins told her two conflicting stories about the reason for the adoption. One story was that when her father found out she was pregnant, he completely rejected her. The other story was that he wanted the twins but by the time his message got to Alice, it was too late.

Both Elizabeth and Ann married in their mid-20s. After Ann left school, she worked as a printer until she was 25 when she married Jim Hunt, whom she had met at school. They lived in Aldershot and had three daughters. After Elizabeth left school, she worked in a sweet shop, but wanted to join the Navy. She went to night school and was later able to join the Women's Royal Naval Service in Portsmouth. She was then stationed in Malta where she met Jim Hamel, an American, on a blind date. Elizabeth married Jim when she was 28. They moved to Oregon, had two sons, and were married for 48 years until Jim died in 2012.

== Reunion ==
After the initial call, the sisters got to know each other using Skype. Finally, on 1 May 2014, over a year after the first phone call, Ann and Elizabeth reunited after 78 years apart. They met in a hotel room in Fullerton, California, which is near Los Angeles. They went to Fullerton to meet because Dr. Nancy Segal invited them to participate her twins research program, which has been going on for over 20 years. After meeting Elizabeth, Ann said "I feel like I've known Liz all my life now." After two days of testing they went to Elizabeth's home in Albany, Oregon. When they went to Oregon, they spent 6 May at Historic Carousel and Museum in Albany and Ann left for England on 9 May.

They found that the hardest part of meeting was the international spotlight they found themselves in. The BBC interviewed them in their room and they also had many requests for interviews from other media outlets. Hamel said that "We've gotten a taste of what it's like to be a famous film star or royalty" as she reportedly wrinkled her face up in disgust. They exchanged gifts as Dr. Segal reports separated twins often do when they reunite. Elizabeth gave Ann a cameo that had been passed down from her grandmother to her mother to her.

== Twin research ==
The twins were invited to the Twin Studies Center at California State University, Fullerton, California, to participate in an ongoing study of twins who have been raised separately most of their lives to investigate the effects of genes on behaviour. During the two-day study, Dr. Segal assessed similarities and differences between the twins and conducted DNA analyses. In particular, she aimed to get a comprehensive assessment of their abilities, interests, and lives since they are the world's longest separated twins.

In the Minnesota Study of Twins Reared Apart, researchers found that 44.5% of twins separated at or near birth were separated because of birth out of marriage. Almost all twins separated for this reason are both adopted, but Ann and Elizabeth's case is unusual because one baby was kept by the natural mother. Dr. Segal has found that twins separated for even long periods of time, have surprising similarities. For example, Bridget and Dorothy, a pair of separated twins were wearing the same jewellery when they were reunited: "seven rings, three bracelets and a watch." Where these similarities come from is a complicated question, but Dr. Segal suspects that genes associated with intelligence, temperament, and personality may explain some of the similarities between separated twins.

Ann and Elizabeth have a number of similarities. They both married men named "Jim." Both are widowed, grandmothers, and religious. After talking on Skype many times during the year before they met, they believe they shared many mannerisms in common. There are also major differences in their lives. Ann married and remained in her birth town. Elizabeth joined the navy, married an American, and ended up moving to the US and becoming an American citizen.

== Guinness World Record ==
Both twins were born on 28 February 1936 and they were separated at five months of age. They were reunited 1 May 2014. The length of their separation was 77 years and 289 days, which is a Guinness World Record for longest separated twins. The previous record was held by Philip and Barbara McAuley also from the United Kingdom. They had been separated for 69 years and 364 days.

== Death ==
Hunt died on 16 December 2017. She was predeceased by Hamel on 8 November 2014.
