= Hedley Churchward =

English painter

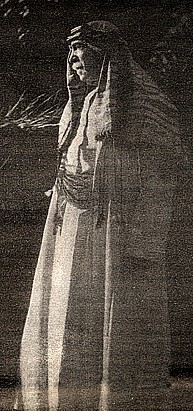
Hedley Churchward c.1910

Al-Hajj Hedley Cole Churchward (Mahmoud Mobarek) (1862, Walmer, Kent – 28 August 1929, Johannesburg), was an English set designer and painter, notable for converting to Islam and in 1910 being the first known British Muslim to make the Hajj.

== Early years ==
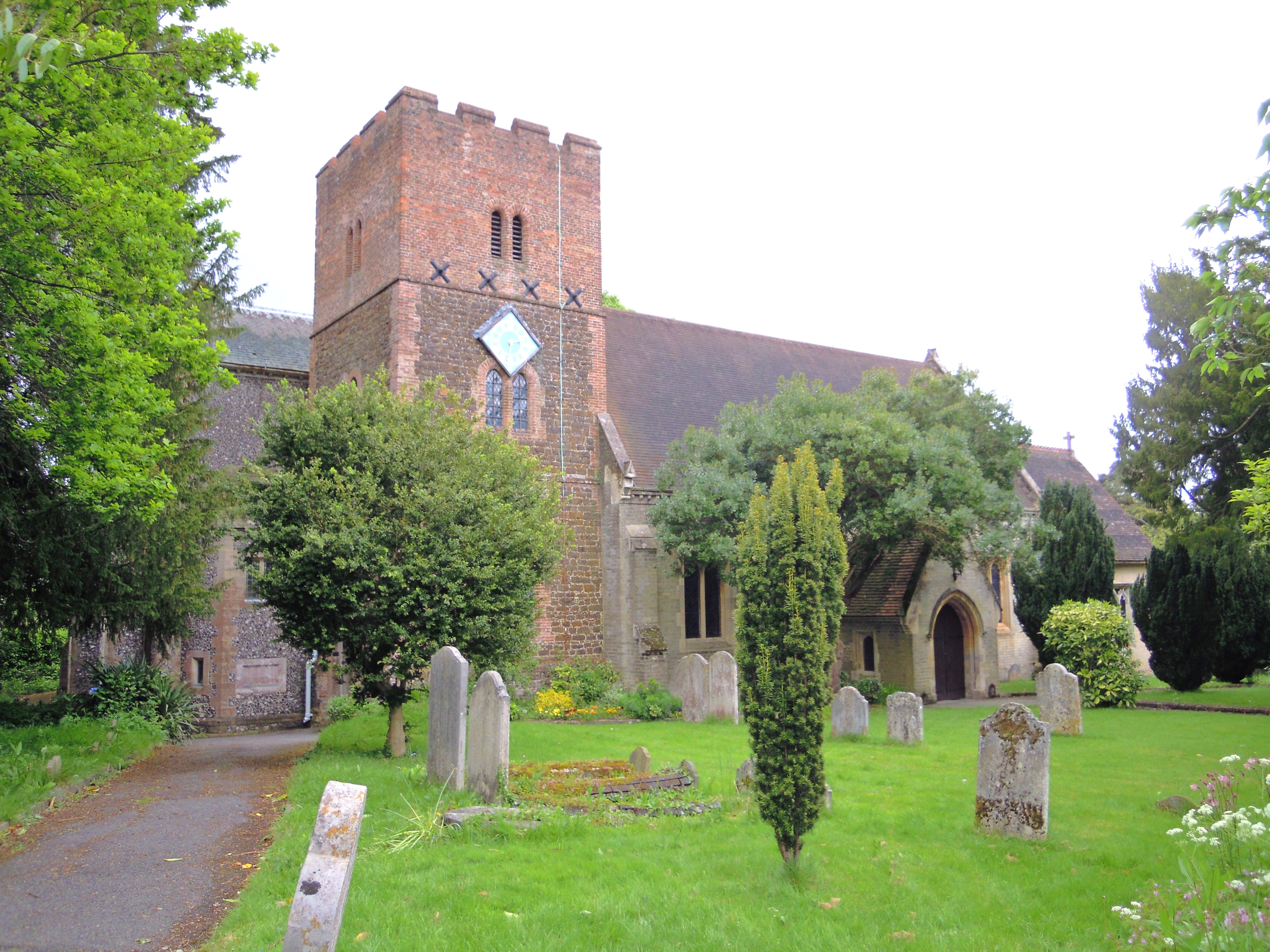
His parents married at St Michael's church in Aldershot in 1858

Born in Walmer in Kent in 1862 to Eliza née Cole (1833–1914) and farmer's son Richard Gunter Churchward (1833–1912), Hedley's father was a cook in the British Army at the time of the Crimean War, an occupation he still held when he married Hedley's mother Eliza in 1858 at St Michael's church in Aldershot. In 1861 when Richard Churchward was initiated as a Freemason into Wellington Lodge No 1086 in Deal in Kent but residing at nearby Walmer his occupation was given as Military Mess Master.

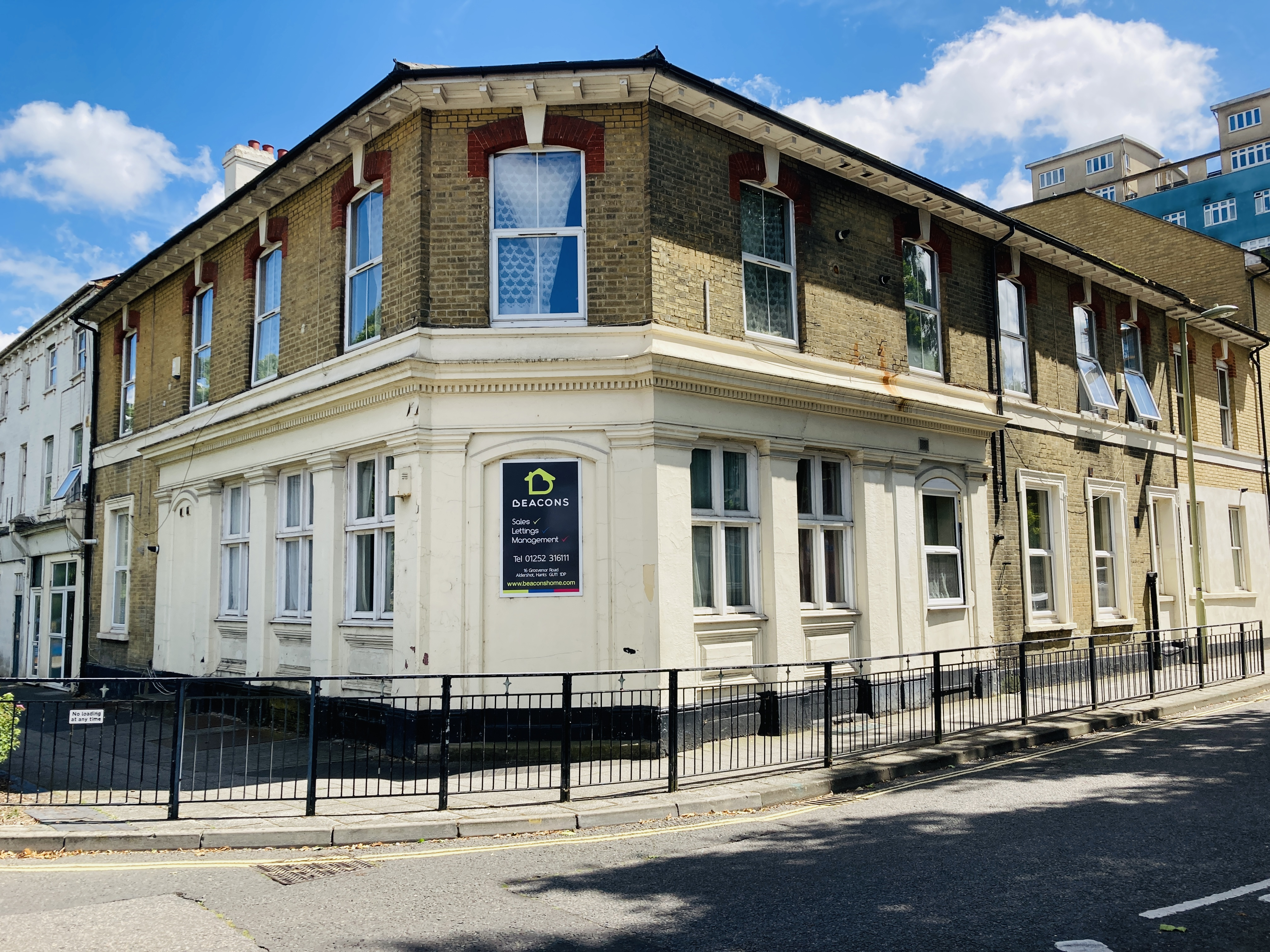
The former Royal Exchange public house in Aldershot (2022)

By 1871 Richard Churchward was the landlord of the Royal Exchange public house in Aldershot and here Hedley lived as a boy. Eric Rosenthal in his biography of Hedley Churchward records Hedley's fanciful claims that the Churchwards were members of an aristocratic family and that because of his father's success in Aldershot the young Hedley became known to Queen Victoria, the Empress Eugenie and the philanthropist Baroness Burdett-Coutts. Rosenthal further records claims that during Hedley's childhood he came into contact with his father's rather unusual circle of friends and acquaintances and was sent to Kilburn College, where he "shared lollipops with the sons of South American presidents, of Indian generals, of big-game hunters, polar explorers and professional empire builders" (Eric Rosenthal, From Drury Lane to Mecca). It can be independently verified that in 1871 aged 9 Hedley was a boarder at Cleveland House School in Hampstead with his older brother Owen.

== Career ==
Poster for Churchward's Hotel in Aldershot (c1884)

His painting skills were said to have been noticed at Kilburn and he was promptly commandeered to produce backdrops. In 1877 his father had become a wine merchant and hotel keeper of the Churchward Hotel on Victoria Road in Aldershot while Hedley served an apprenticeship in the Merchant Navy from 1880 to 1884. On leaving the Merchant Navy Hedley with his older brother Owen Churchward ran these ventures as O & H Churchward. However, the businesses were not a success and they were declared bankrupt in 1885.

After this business failure Hedley was apprenticed to the well-known scene-painter Walter Brookes Spong of Sadler's Wells Theatre, and in the late 1880s became an important part of London's West End circle of artists, working at the Globe Theatre and Drury Lane, and with notable figures such as Tennyson, Millais, Lord Leighton, and Lily Langtry. In 1889 he worked as a scene painter in Melbourne, Australia and exhibited at the Victorian Artists' Society there. From 1890 to 1891 he was working elsewhere in Australia.

== Conversion ==
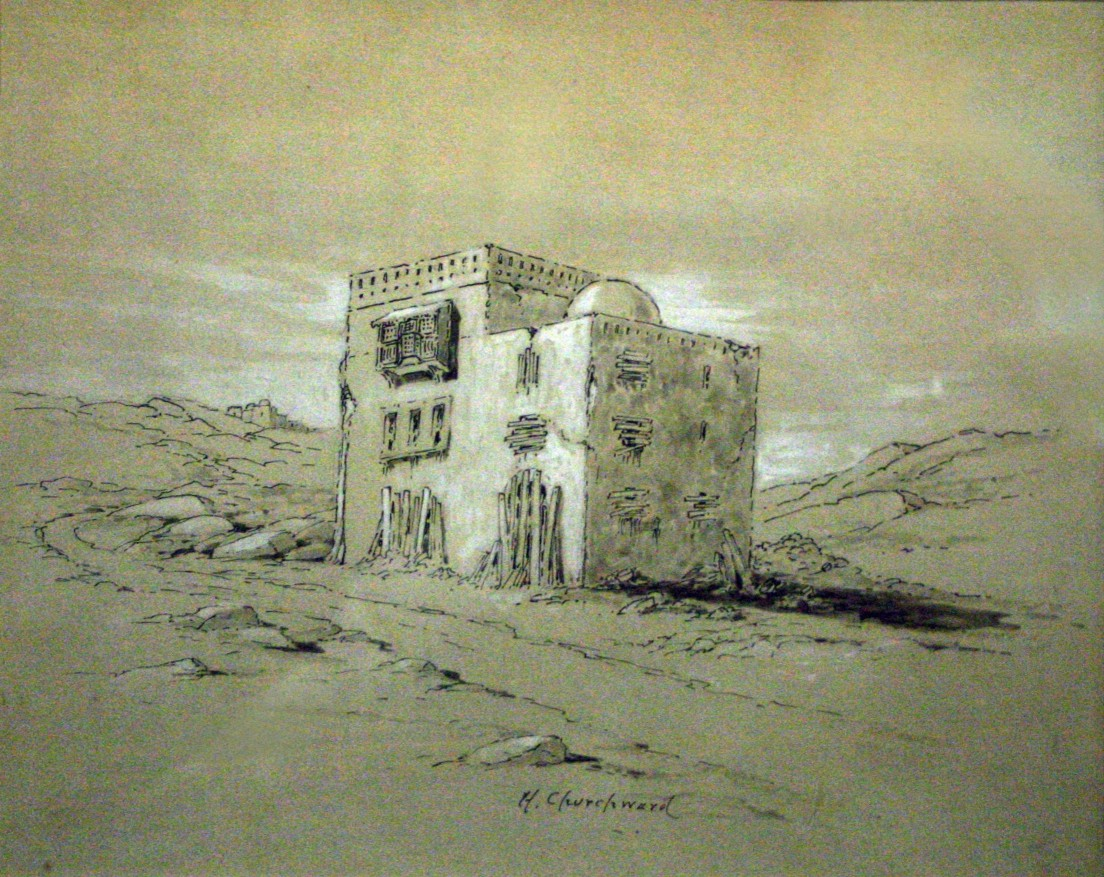
House of the Jinns

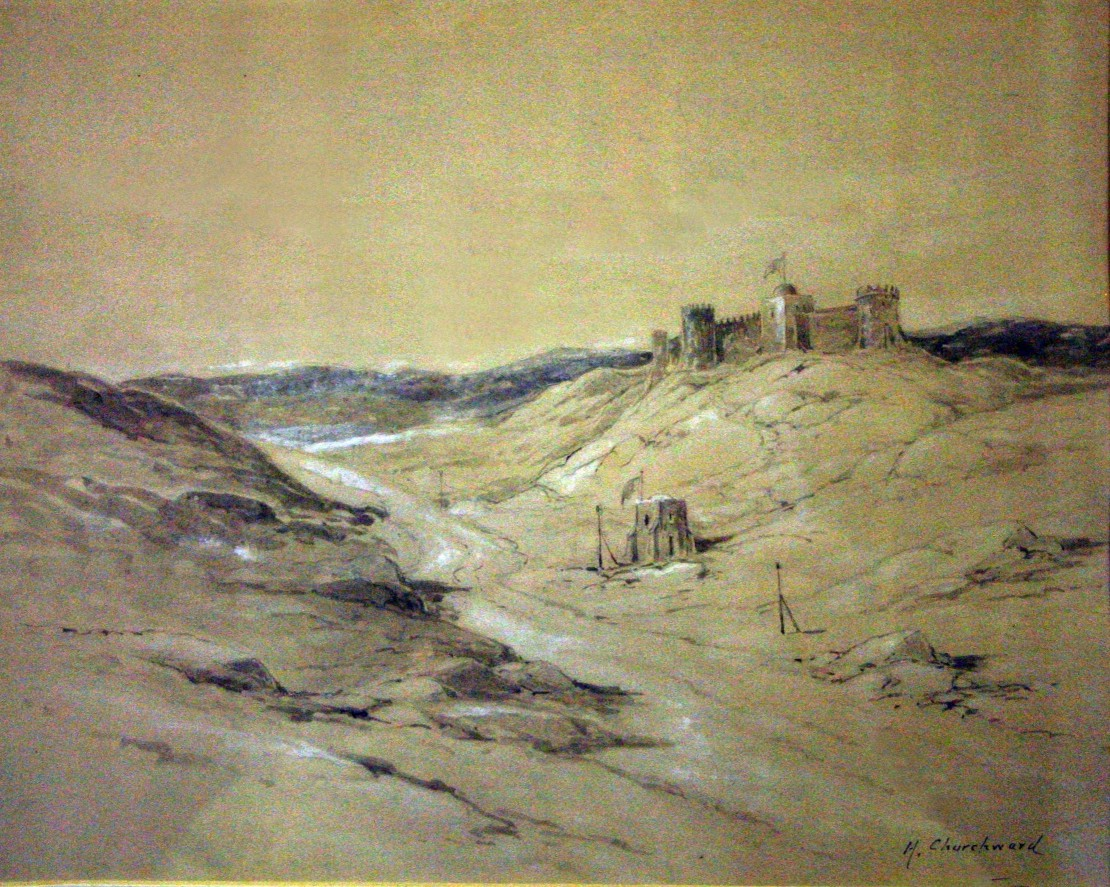
On the road to Mecca

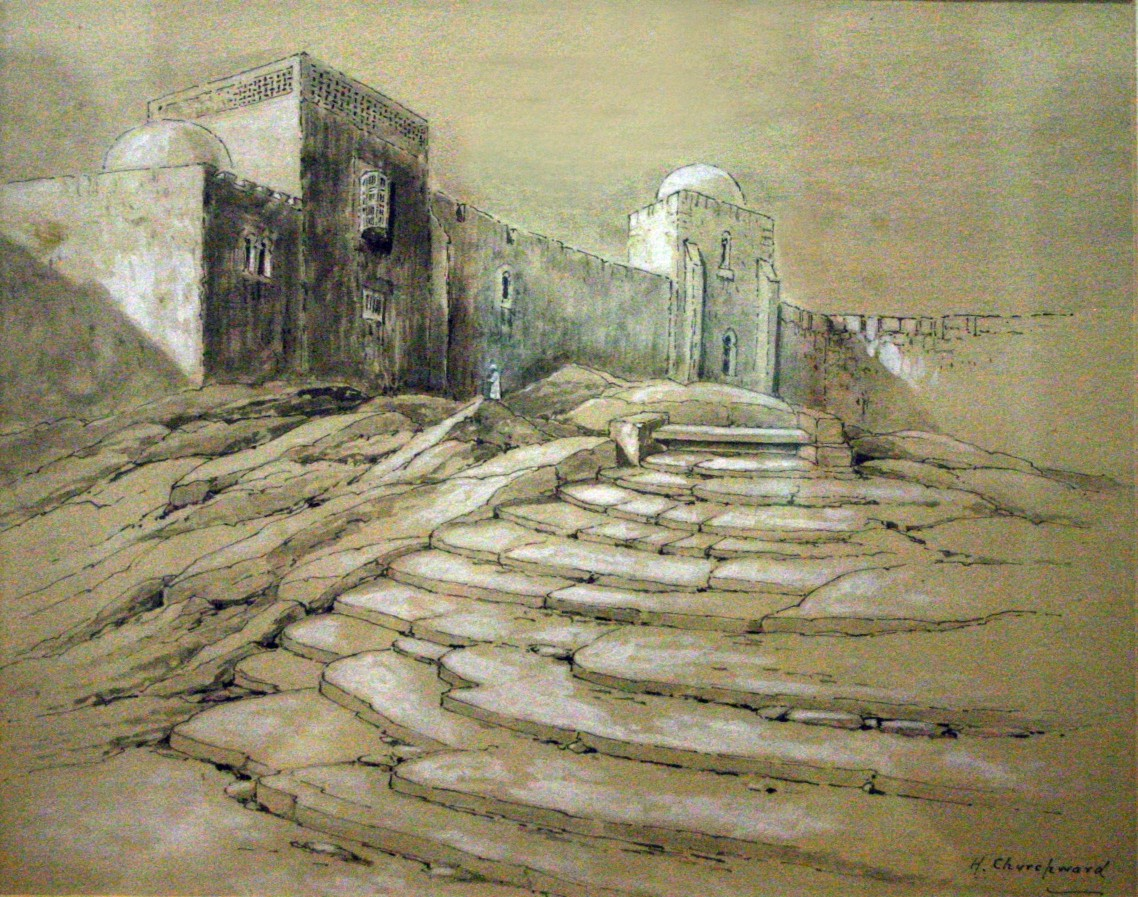
Hagar's steps

On a sketching trip to Spain Churchward first made his acquaintance with Islam. He was awed by the Alhambra in Granada and the stunning architecture of the Córdoba Mosque, developed a liking for the landscape of Al-Andalus, and determined to travel to Morocco. He became steeped in Arab culture, gradually exchanging his western clothing for local garb and announcing to his family that he had adopted Islam.

In Cairo, his growing reputation in the Arab world, resulted in a commission to decorate one of the city's mosques. He built a home for himself close to the Pyramids, and became a student at the Al-Azhar. He proved an able scholar, and soon preached sermons at a small mosque, winning an appointment as lecturer in Sira at the Qadi's Academy. In the years that followed he shuttled between England and Morocco, also managing to visit Australia and South Africa to investigate work opportunities. In South Africa his art and easy elegance gained him the patronage of Cecil Rhodes and the favour of the Randlords. Churchward's intercession with President Paul Kruger resulted in the construction of the first mosque on the Witwatersrand.

=== Hajj ===
His many visits to Cairo led to his marrying Gadijah Salie (1869–1942), the daughter of a Shafi Jurist of Al-Azhar. After his conversion he planned on making the Hajj to Mecca, amidst doubts expressed by the British Embassy in Cairo. He was subjected to a lengthy examination by the Qadi of Egypt to determine the extent of his faith and knowledge. Passing the test, he received a testimonial ornately endorsed by the chief Ottoman cleric, leading scholars and imams, certifying his suitability for the pilgrimage.

Hedley and his wife settled amongst the Cape Malays of South Africa. A year later, Hedley left Johannesburg on the first stage of his hajj. The steamship voyage went via Bombay, where he arranged passage on an ancient pilgrim ship, the SS Islamic. The vessel, armed against pirates, and captained by a cantankerous Scotsman, finally made its way to the Red Sea. The boat docked at the Sudanese port of Suakin, where Churchward called on the British Consul, to be informed that the Arab authorities would almost certainly not allow him to disembark at Jeddah. Having arrived in Jeddah, Hedley encountered no problem with the officials and set off the following evening with two donkeys and a pilgrim guide with Halley's Comet a brilliant spectacle in the heavens.

After two days of hot and exhausting travel, Hedley and his guide arrived in the Holy City.

A few of Churchward's paintings and drawings are preserved at the University of Witwatersrand.

== Bibliography ==
- Rosenthal, Eric & Churchward, Hedley:From Drury Lane to Mecca – Being an account of the strange life and adventures of Hedley Churchward, etc. (1931)
