= Edgar Sheldrake =

English cricketer

Personal information
- Full name: Edgar Francis Talman Sheldrake
- Born: 18 January 1864; Aldershot, Hampshire, England
- Died: 14 December 1950 (aged 86); Surbiton, Surrey, England
- Batting: Right-handed
- Bowling: Right-arm fast

Domestic team information
- Years: Team
- 1884–1885: Hampshire

Career statistics
Competition	First-class
Matches	3
Runs scored	52
Batting average	10.40
100s/50s	–/–
Top score	20
Balls bowled	160
Wickets	1
Bowling average	78.00
5 wickets in innings	–
10 wickets in match	–
Best bowling	1/41
Catches/stumpings	–/–
- Source: Cricinfo, 15 December 2009

Edgar Francis Talman Sheldrake (18 January 1864 — 14 December 1950) was an English first-class cricketer and publisher.

Edgar Sheldrake was born in Aldershot in Hampshire in 1864, the son of William Henry Sheldrake (1816–1885), a stationer and printer of Sheldrake's Aldershot Military Gazette. As a young man he joined his father's publishing and printing business in Aldershot.

Sheldrake performed well in club cricket in Aldershot, which gained the attention of Hampshire. He went on to play for Hampshire in three first-class cricket matches, playing twice in 1884 against Sussex and Somerset and once in 1885 against Surrey. In these, he scored 52 runs with a highest score of 20, in addition to taking a single wicket. Although his county cricket amounted to three matches, he continued to play in Aldershot club cricket for the Aldershot Athletic Club, where he scored heavily as a batsman into the 1890s. After his cricketing career he continued to work for the family newsagent and stationers business.

On 3 February 1900, he married Lucy Maunde (1862–1935) at St Bartholomew's church in Haslemere in Surrey. There were no children from the marriage. Sheldrake died in Surbiton in December 1950.
