= Peter Sainsbury =

English cricketer (1934–2014)

- Sainsbury in 1958

Personal information
- Full name: Peter James Sainsbury
- Born: 13 June 1934; Chandlers Ford, Hampshire, England
- Died: 12 July 2014 (aged 80); Southampton, Hampshire, England
- Nickname: Sains
- Batting: Right-handed
- Bowling: Slow left-arm orthodox

Domestic team information
- Years: Team
- 1954–1976: Hampshire
- 1955–1960: Marylebone Cricket Club

Career statistics
Competition	First-class	List A
Matches	618	165
Runs scored	20,176	2,079
Batting average	26.86	19.61
100s/50s	7/97	0/5
Top score	163	76
Balls bowled	89,896	7,821
Wickets	1,316	202
Bowling average	24.14	23.90
5 wickets in innings	36	1
10 wickets in match	5	0
Best bowling	8/76	7/30
Catches/stumpings	617/–	1/–
- Source: Cricinfo, 28 August 2009

Peter James Sainsbury (13 June 1934 – 12 July 2014) was an English professional cricketer who played first-class cricket for Hampshire from 1954 to 1976 and the Marylebone Cricket Club from 1955 to 1960. Born in Chandlers Ford, Hampshire in June 1934, Sainsbury was educated in Southampton, where he first played cricket and as a teenager was coached by Arthur Holt. After making his debut for Hampshire, his career was interrupted by two years of National Service, during which he played first-class cricket for the Combined Services. After completing his National Service, Sainsbury established himself in the Hampshire team as an all-rounder who bowled slow left-arm orthodox spin and batted as a right-hander in the middle order. In his first full season in 1955, he took a hundred wickets in a season. He established a spin bowling partnership with Mervyn Burden in the 1950s and into the early 1960s.

He was a member of the Hampshire team that won their first County Championship in 1961, and their second in 1973; he is the only player to have featured in both of Hampshire's County Championship winning teams. His bowling declined in the 1960s, due to him producing less flight with the ball, but he had marked success as a batsman, passing a thousand runs in a season six times in the 1960s, including five seasons in a row between 1960 and 1964. With the introduction of one-day cricket in 1963, Sainsbury was described as one of the first players to adapt to the format. With the return of his ability to flight the ball at the end of the 1960s, he found new success as a bowler and took over a hundred wickets during the 1971 season. He was named one of the five Wisden Cricketers of the Year for 1974, becoming the first Hampshire-born Cricketer of the Year. He won the John Player League in 1975, before retiring at the end of the 1976 season.

In 618 first-class matches, Sainsbury took 1,316 wickets, including 36 five wicket hauls. His career total is the seventh highest in first-class cricket, with his is 1,245 wickets for Hampshire the fifth most for the county. As a batsman, he scored 20,176 runs making seven centuries and 97 half-centuries. He scored 19,576 runs, the eighth highest aggregate for the county. He was a renowned fielder, later being considered by the cricket historian John Arlott to have been the best short-leg fielder in the world. He took 617 wickets in first-class cricket, with his 601 for Hampshire only bettered by Phil Mead. In one-day cricket, he scored over 2,000 runs and took more than 200 wickets. Despite his all-round record, Sainsbury never won a Test cap for England, finding himself overlooked for the spin bowlers spot by Tony Lock, Ray Illingworth, Fred Titmus, and Derek Underwood; his abilities as a fielder often saw him fulfill twelfth man duties for England.

Following his retirement, Sainsbury coached Hampshire following the death of Geoff Keith from 1977 to 1991, leading Hampshire to success in one-day cricket in the 1978 John Player League, 1986 John Player Special League, to their first cup final appearance at Lord's in the 1988 Benson & Hedges Cup, in which they were victorious, and to the 1991 NatWest Trophy. After the end of his coaching career, he ran a sports shop alongside his former teammate Jimmy Gray in Shirley, Southampton. He died on 12 July 2014.

== Cricket career ==
=== Early life and career ===
Peter James Sainsbury was born on 13 June 1934 in Chandler's Ford, Hampshire. He was educated at Bitterne Park Secondary Modern School, playing both cricket and football for combined Southampton schools. Aged 14, he was amongst the first to play for Hampshire's newly formed colt's side in 1949, under the guidance of coach Arthur Holt. He joined the staff at Hampshire the following year, and played for the Second Eleven a week after his 16th birthday. The start of his career was interrupted by two-years compulsory National Service, beginning in July 1952. Sainsbury later made his first-class debut for Hampshire against Oxford University at Oxford; following this match, he played twice for the Combined Services against the touring Pakistanis, and Yorkshire. He made his County Championship debut in the 1954 County Championship, when he played against Nottinghamshire at Southampton, scoring 63 runs in Hampshire's second innings and added 90 runs for the eighth wicket with Desmond Eagar. Sainsbury made six Championship appearances in the latter half of the 1954 season. In his first season, he took 25 wickets with his slow left-arm orthodox bowling at a bowling average of 27.96; he took his first five wicket haul (5 for 63) against Kent.

=== Established all-rounder ===
Sainsbury established himself in the Hampshire team in 1955, making 30 first-class appearances. He took 102 wickets at 18.50, taking five or more wickets in an innings on six occasions. Against Essex in June, he took 7 for 25 to help Hampshire to victory by seven wickets. On his 21st birthday against Yorkshire, he took 5 for 19 in their first innings and 4 for 43 in their second, dismissing Len Hutton twice in a day. Hampshire won the match by an innings, their first victory over Yorkshire in 23 years. He was Hampshire's second-highest wicket-taker in the 1955 County Championship with 97, behind Derek Shackleton's 147. With the bat, he scored 586 runs at an average of 15.42. He was awarded his county cap at the end of the season, and was chosen for the Marylebone Cricket Club (MCC) 'A' tour of Pakistan during the winter. His selection ended Chelsea manager Ted Drake's hopes of signing Sainsbury, after he had received reports of his abilities as an outside left in Southampton club football. He made nine first-class appearances on the tour, playing in two of the four representative matches against Pakistan. He took 16 first-class wickets on the tour, averaging 16.75. Upstaged on the tour by fellow spinner Tony Lock, Sainsbury attempted to emulate his bowling, negatively affecting his own game for the next two years.

In the 1956 season he took 59 wickets with two five wicket hauls from 32 first-class matches, his average rising to 28.38, with his batting yielding him 741 runs at a batting average of 22.45, with two half centuries. He had played for the MCC at the start of the season, making two appearances at Lord's against Yorkshire and Surrey, followed by a third later in the season against the touring Australians. The following season, he took 57 wickets at 24.49 from 28 appearances, though he took five wickets in an innings just once. He scored 652 runs at an average of 18.11, passing fifty once — a score of 94 against Worcestershire that formed part of a 154 runs partnership made in 135 minutes with Leo Harrison. Prior to the 1958 season, Sainsbury received coaching from former Surrey bowler Alf Gover. His all-round form assisted Hampshire to second place in the 1958 County Championship. He took 71 wickets at 19.98, with two five wicket hauls from 34 matches. As a consequence of Jimmy Gray breaking his arm prior to the season, Hampshire were left without an opening partner for Roy Marshall; Sainsbury was one of five batsman to open the batting (Note: The others were: David Blake, Bernard Harrison, Raymond Pitman, and Alan Rayment.) prior to Gray's return at the end of May. Sainsbury scored 886 runs at 22.78 during the season, scoring his maiden first-class century (105 runs) against Worcestershire in August. He took part in the season-ending Scarborough Festival, playing for the MCC against Yorkshire and earning his callup to the Gentlemen versus Players fixture; as a paid professional he represented the Players, in contrast to unpaid amateurs who played for the Gentlemen. His 6 for 72 in the Gentlemen's second innings helped the Players to victory with 25 minutes left in the match.

In the early stages of England's 1958–59 tour of Australia, it was decided to add another spinner to the squad, with Sainsbury being chosen. However, by the following morning, the decision had changed and John Mortimore was called-up instead; this would not be revealed until 2004, when a letter detailing the decision was discovered. Sainsbury made 25 appearances in the 1959 season, though missed six weeks in June and July through pneumonia. He took 60 wickets at 27.75 and scored 934 runs at 30.12. He made six half-centuries during the season, with his highest score coming against Warwickshire in May, when he made 96 runs and shared in a partnership of 86 runs for the seventh wicket with Leo Harrison, to aid Hampshire's recovery from 87 for 6. He played again in the Scarborough Festival at the end of the season, playing for a second time in the Gentlemen versus Players fixture. Following the season, he travelled to South Africa to coach alongside Holt and teammates Gray and Marshall. He passed a thousand runs in a season for the first time in 1960, scoring 1,195 at 29.14 from 35 matches, with seven half-centuries; his highest score for the season, an unbeaten 98 runs, came in May against Warwickshire. He took 81 wickets in the season at 25.33, claiming five or more wickets three times. He took part in the Scarborough Festival at the end of the season, playing in the Gentlemen versus Players fixture and for T. N. Pearce's XI against the touring South Africans.

=== First County Championship ===
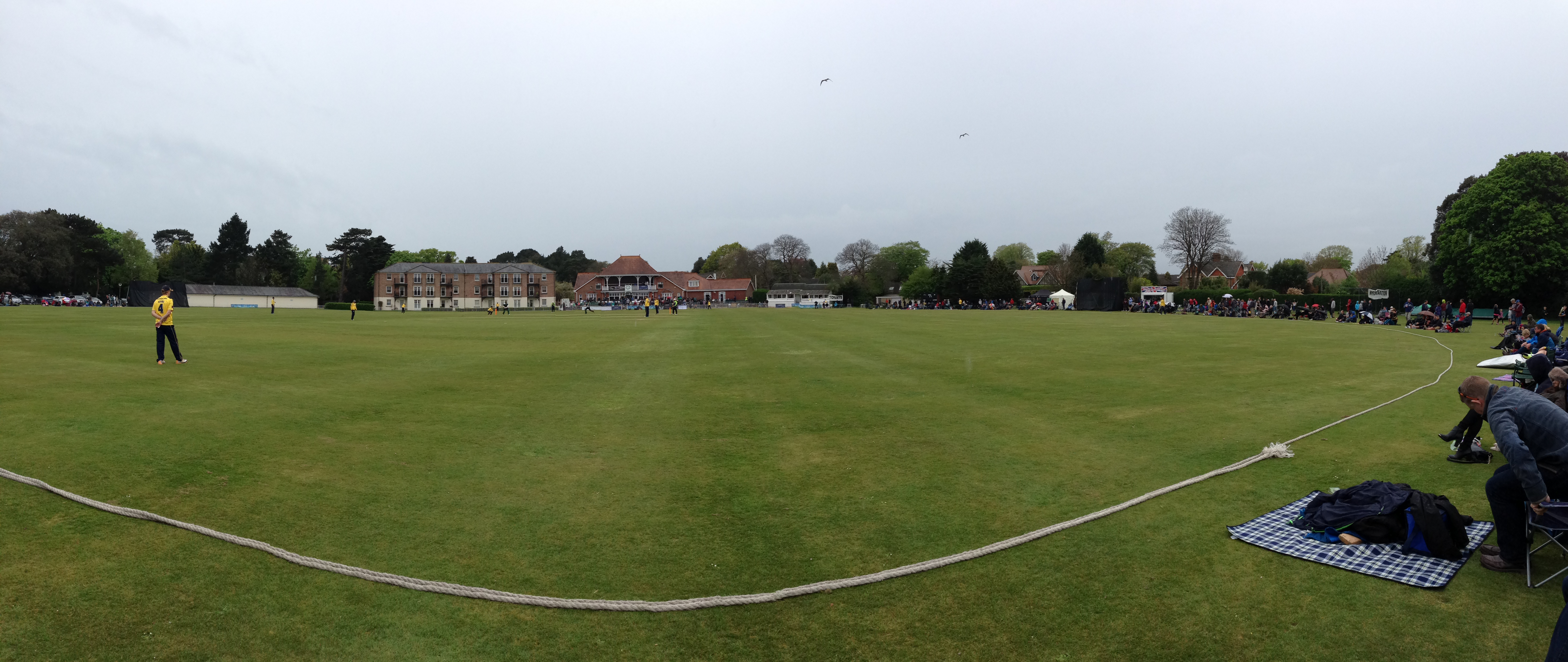
Sainsbury took the wicket that secured Hampshire the 1961 County Championship title at Dean Park in Bournemouth (pictured in 2015)

Sainsbury was a key part of Hampshire's first County Championship title winning team in 1961, making 1,459 runs in the County Championship at 31.04; he would make one century and eight half-centuries in the Championship. His century was the highest score of his career to that point, an unbeaten 125 runs against Glamorgan. The Hampshire Telegraph noted that his batting consistency often ensured Hampshire gained first innings batting points. He also took 54 wickets at 26.09, taking six wickets in an innings once. In the final Championship match of the season, he played an important role in Hampshire's victory against Derbyshire at Bournemouth, which secured them the title. On the final day, Hampshire were 129 runs ahead with six wickets remaining, and a draw looking the likely outcome. With Barnard, he put on 99 runs in 70 minutes for the fifth wicket, allowing them to declare on 263 for 8; this gave Shackleton (6 for 39) time to bowl Hampshire to victory. Sainsbury took the final wicket in Derbyshire's innings, that of Harold Rhodes. Hampshire could not repeat their 1961 success the following season, finishing tenth in the County Championship. In 33 first-class matches in 1962, he scored 1,503 runs at 31.97, making eight half-centuries and one century for the second consecutive season; he surpassed his highest first-class score, with 163 runs against Oxford University in June. Although he had begun to concentrate more on batting, he still took 56 wickets at 28.57 in 1962.

Sainsbury made 30 first-class appearances in the 1963 season. He scored 1,046 runs at 22.25, making a century and three half-centuries. He bowled less in 1963, delivering 229 fewer overs compared to the previous season, and took 37 wickets at an average of 30.62; his only five wicket haul (7 for 77) came against Yorkshire. In May, he was a member of Hampshire's team for their inaugural List A one-day match against Derbyshire in the 1963 Gillette Cup. At the end of the season, Mervyn Burden, with whom Sainsbury had formed a bowling partnership with since his debut, retired. In 1964, he scored a thousand runs in a season for the fifth consecutive year. His 1,305 runs came at 34.34, making one century and three half-centuries. He notably scored an aggressive 90 runs in 130 minutes against the touring Australians, helping Hampshire recover from 85 for 5 to 232 for 8; when his scored reached 43 runs, Sainsbury passed 10,000 career first-class runs. He took 57 wickets at 23.12; he showed considerable control against Glamorgan, bowling 31 overs, 27 of which were maidens. He played twice in the 1964 Gillette Cup, in Hampshire's victory against minor county Wiltshire in the first round and their defeat to Warwickshire in the second.

Sainsbury was afforded a benefit in 1965, raising £6,035. He again played 30 first-class matches, scoring 917 runs at 26.20, but did not score a century. He took 67 wickets at an average of 23.64, with one five wicket haul. In the Gillette Cup first round against minor county Norfolk, he became the first man to take seven wickets in a one-day match when he claimed 7 for 30, that included the first six wickets to fall; this would remain a Hampshire one-day record until it was surpassed by Liam Dawson's 7 for 15 against Warwickshire in 2023. He also scored his first one-day half-century in the match, making 76 runs. He subsequently played in the second-round victory against Kent and their quarter-final defeat to Warwickshire. In the 1966 season, Sainsbury made 27 first-class appearances, scoring 819 runs at 27.30. In 1966, the Test and County Cricket Board introduced a rule that in twelve of each county's Championship matches the first innings would be restricted to 65 overs. Conversely, Sainsbury's bowling workload reduced and he took only 21 wickets at 42.14. In one-day cricket that season, he made four appearances in Hampshire's run to the semi-final of the 1966 Gillette Cup. He would pass a thousand runs for the sixth and last time in the 1967 season, scoring 1,164 at 34.23, making eight half-centuries from 30 matches. The limitation on first innings came to an end in 1967, and although his workload increased as a result, he still took only 35 wickets at an average of 35.02. He featured in all three of Hampshire's matches in the 1967 Gillette Cup.

Sainsbury made 31 first-class appearances in 1968, scoring 975 runs at 24.37, making four half-centuries. Alongside this, he also took 43 wickets at an average of 29.20. He played in Hampshire's second round victory over minor county Bedfordshire in the Gillette Cup, and quarter-final defeat to Warwickshire. He made 21 first-class appearances the following season, scoring 610 runs and taking 36 wickets at an average of 27.11. In a season in which the one-day format was expanded with the introduction of the Player's County League, Sainsbury made 15 one-day appearances. In these, he scored 189 runs with a highest score of 60 not out, and took 29 wickets at 14.86. He was the second highest wicket taker in the Player's County League with 28, behind Ray East (29), with Sainsbury's tally helping Hampshire to finish second in the competition.

=== Second County Championship ===
Having lost much of his ability to flight the ball for a large part of the 1960s, Sainsbury had rediscovered it by the 1970 season. He took over 50 wickets for the first time since 1965, with 71 from 23 matches at 26.54, claiming five wickets in an innings twice. He finished second in Hampshire's County Championship bowling aggregates, with 68 wickets, seven behind Bob Cottam, and scored 688 runs at 23.72, making two half centuries. In one-day cricket in 1970, he made 17 appearances, taking 19 wickets at an average of 28.57. He achieved greater success bowling in first-class cricket in the 1971 season, having taken on a heavier workload following the retirement of Shackleton and frequent injuries to Butch White. In 25 matches, he took 107 wickets at 17.51; he claimed five wickets in an innings on seven occasions, and took ten wickets in a match three times. He achieved his career-best bowling figures of 8 for 76 against Gloucestershire in August. He was Hampshire's leading wicket taker in the County Championship with 101, and nationally he was behind Fred Titmus (102) and Lance Gibbs (123). He also scored 959 runs, averaging 33.06, with nine half-centuries, narrowly missing out on the double. He made 16 one-day appearances in 1971, taking 25 wickets at 18.16, and scored 255 runs, averaging 21.25 alongside 19 wickets. He won The Cricket Society's Wetherall Award in recognition of him being the leading all-rounder in county cricket in 1971.

Sainsbury made 21 first-class appearances in 1972. He bowled 250 fewer overs compared to 1971 during the season, taking 49 wickets at 26.87. He also scored 628 runs, averaging 28.54, and making three half-centuries. His 21 one-day appearances yielded him 19 wickets at an average of 23.63 and 229 runs. Hampshire won their second County Championship title in 1973, going unbeaten throughout the competition. Sainsbury was the only member of the team remaining from their 1961 success. He made 22 first-class appearances in the season, taking 53 wickets at 17.83, taking five wickets in an innings twice; his best figures, 6 for 29, came against Sussex in May. At various times in the season he combined well with the slow-left arm spin of David O'Sullivan, with their bowling partnership spinning Hampshire to the verge of the Championship title by late August. He scored 758 runs at 34.45, making one century, an unbeaten 120 runs made in just over five hours against Somerset; it was his first since 1964. He came to the crease with Hampshire 59 for 5 in their first innings, and alongside O'Sullivan's 45 runs, he took the total to 262. In the Championship, he ended the season as Hampshire's third highest runscorer and headed their bowling averages. He also made twenty one-day appearances during the season, taking 18 wickets and scoring 173 runs.

=== Wisden Cricketer of the Year and retirement ===
Ahead of the 1974 season, Sainsbury was named one of the five Wisden Cricketers of the Year, and the first born in Hampshire. In 21 first-class matches in 1974, he took 35 wickets at an average of 23.22, but bowled only 425 overs across the season, his lowest since 1966. He was Hampshire's sole spinner during the season, with the attack led largely by the seam bowling of Bob Herman, Andy Roberts, and Mike Taylor. He also scored 599 runs at 33.27, narrowly missing out on making a century against Gloucestershire in July, with 98 runs. Hampshire missed out on consecutive County Championship titles, finishing in second place, two points behind Worcestershire. In 21 one-day matches in 1974, Sainsbury took 30 wickets, averaging 18.46, and scored 284 runs. He was afforded a testimonial in 1974, that raised £8,843. Shortly after the season ended, he was selected in the International Wanderers team that toured Rhodesia and Transvaal; the team was promoted by the businessman Derrick Robins. Tours to South Africa were considered controversial due to the apartheid policies of its government, and were viewed as breaking the anti-apartheid stance that had seen South Africa isolated in international cricket in 1971; despite this, the tour received little political or public condemnation. The team played one first-class match each against Rhodesia and Transvaal.

In the 1975 season, he made 19 first-class appearances, 18 of which came in the County Championship. In these, he scored 834 runs at 30.88, making his final century (105 runs) against Nottinghamshire in June. He also claimed 52 wickets, averaging 21.78, and twice taking five wickets in an innings. Hampshire enjoyed success in one-day cricket in 1975, winning the John Player League. Sainsbury contributed 20 wickets from 24 matches at an average of 32.90, and scored 295 runs, the highest aggregate of his career, averaging 22.69 and making one half-century. It was announced at the beginning of the 1976 season that Sainsbury would retire at the end of the season, bringing to a close his 22-year career. His retirement from playing would enable him to succeed Hampshire coach Geoff Keith, who had passed away in December 1975. He made 16 first-class appearances in the season, and had success with the ball, finishing fourth in the national bowling averages; he took 66 wickets at 18.72, taking five or more wickets on four occasions, and ten wickets in a match twice. His best figure of 8 for 114 came against Gloucestershire, a match in which he took overall figures of 12 for 184. Alongside his wicket tally, he also scored 492 runs at 23.42, making three half-centuries. Making 16 one-day appearances, he took 16 wickets at 32.75, and scored 241 runs. He was adjudged man-of-the-match in the Gillette Cup quarter-final against Derbyshire, taking 4 for 49 and scoring 63 runs, his only one-day half-century in the season.

=== Playing style and statistics ===
Sainsbury was a slow left-arm orthodox bowler (delivery shown in animation).

An all-rounder, Arlott described him as "immensely fit" and "keen" cricketer. As a slow left-arm orthodox bowler, his inability to impart spin on the ball was attributed by Arlott to his small hands and short fingers, which did not allow him to gain sufficient purchase on the ball; this meant that on flat and unresponsive wickets he was unable to generate much spin off the pitch. Sainsbury admitted that he was rarely able to turn the ball, and remarked that this contributed to him being overlooked by England at Test level and saw him behind Lock, Ray Illingworth, Titmus, and Derek Underwood for the spin bowlers spot. He possessed an arm ball that went straight on without spinning, taking many wickets by luring batsmen into playing for spin on the ball. He was described in the Maidstone Telegraph by the cricketer Doug Wright in 1958 as an "economical" bowler; this view was later correlated to his bowling in one-day cricket by Arlott, who described it as "tight", and by Wisden, that remarked that he "seldom [gave] anything away". His delivery trajectory changed in limited-overs cricket, being much flatter. The cricket journalist Ryan Bailey opined that Sainsbury was one of the first spin bowlers to adapt to limited-overs cricket.

Although naturally a left-handed batsman, Sainsbury batted right-handed. He predominantly batted in the middle-order (usually at number six), but could also open the batting. He was useful for halting a batting collapse, with Bailey believing that he gave the Hampshire side "solidity" through his presence in the middle order. Wright described him as a "useful bat" and in possession of a good defence; he used his defence as the springboard to play shots described by Wisden as "nudges, squirts, pushes, dabs and flicks". Conversely, he could score quickly if required by manipulating the field with clever placement of the ball and quick running between the wickets. Norman Yardley, writing in the Derby Telegraph, described him as a "forcing" batsman. Despite this, Arlott proffered that he never dominated opponents. His batting adapted to the advent of one-day cricket, where he was a "busy" batter who used his favourite shot, a hit over mid-off, effectively.

Sainsbury was considered an excellent fielder, with Wisden claiming he had few peers who could match his abilities in the field. He was particularly strong close to the wicket at short-leg, where he took many catches from Shackleton's bowling. Arlott considered him to have been one of the best in the world at that position. Sainsbury's athletic physique complimented his agility in the field; his speed saved many runs, and he possessed the ability to pick the ball up at speed and throw in one movement. He was a good fielder away from short-leg, taking catches in the deep and having a good aim at the stumps when attempting to run out opponents. Arlott reckoned that his reputation alone deterred opponents from taking him on in the field. His fielding abilities saw him selected as England's twelfth man several times.

Sainsbury made 618 appearances in first-class cricket. He took 1,316 wickets during his career at 21.23, taking five or more wickets in an innings 36 times and ten wickets or more in a match on five. He took 50 wickets or more in 16 seasons. For Hampshire, he made 593 first-class appearances, third to Alec Kennedy's 596 and Phil Mead's 700. He took 1,245 wickets at an average of 24.14 for Hampshire, taking five wickets or more in an innings on 35 occasions, with all five of his ten-wicket match hauls coming for the county. His wickets aggregate is the fifth highest for Hampshire. Sainsbury had success as a bowler with other first-class teams, beside Hampshire. Sainsbury made 16 appearances for the MCC between 1955 and 1960, taking 30 wickets at 25.46, whilst his three appearances for the Players yielded him 21 wickets at 20.95. In one-day cricket, he made 165 appearances. He took 202 wickets at an average of 23.90, taking five wickets in an innings once. Sainsbury scored 20,176 runs at 26.86 in his first-class career, making seven centuries and 97 half-centuries. For Hampshire, he scored 19,576 runs, the eighth highest aggregate for the county, and made all seven of his centuries for the county. He scored over a thousand runs in a season on six occasions, and is one of 20 players in first-class history to score 20,000 runs and take 1,000 wickets, and the only without a Test cap. In one-day cricket, he scored 2,079 runs at 19.61, making five half-centuries. He took 617 catches in first-class cricket, 601 for Hampshire — a total only bettered by Mead.

== Coaching career ==
Sainsbury took over the role of Hampshire coach on 1 April 1977, with Barry Reed having assumed some of Keith's coaching responsibilities on a caretaker basis in 1976. He coached Hampshire to the 1978 John Player League and the 1986 John Player Special League titles, and to their first cup final appearance at Lord's in the 1988 Benson & Hedges Cup, where the county defeated Derbyshire by seven wickets, and again in 1991, when Hampshire won the NatWest Trophy for the first time. He coached Hampshire to the runners-up spot in the 1985 County Championship. With Sainsbury and his wife, Joyce, emigrating to South Africa in the winter of 1989, there was speculation that he might not be able to continue as coach the following year; however, he was offered a six-month summer contract to return for the 1990 season. He stood down as Hampshire coach at the end of the 1991 season, and was succeeded by Tim Tremlett.

== Personal life ==
Sainsbury took a keen interest in schools' cricket, and was president of the Rushmoor Primary Schools' Cricket Association. He was also president of the village cricket club in Eversley in the north-east of Hampshire. Following his retirement as Hampshire coach in 1991, Sainsbury joined the staff at Embley near Romsey, where he tended to the school playing fields and coached the pupils. Alongside Jimmy Gray, Sainsbury took over the Holt and Haskell shop in Shirley; the shop had been established by Arthur Holt in 1946. In retirement, he enjoyed playing golf. Sainsbury died in Southampton on 12 July 2014, nearly a month after his 80th birthday; he was survived by his wife, with whom he had a son and a daughter. Following his death, tributes were paid by Hampshire chairman Rod Bransgrove, and cricketers Ian Botham, Mark Nicholas, Shaun Udal, and former teammate Reed.

== Works cited ==
- Arlott, John (1979). John Arlott's Book Of Cricketers. London: Sphere Books. ISBN 978-0-7188-2306-1 – via Internet Archive.
- Booth, Douglas (1998). The Race Game: Sport and Politics in South Africa. London: Frank Cass & Co. ISBN 978-0-7146-4799-9 – via Internet Archive.
- Wilde, Simon (2013). Wisden Cricketers of the Year: A Celebration of Cricket's Greatest Players. London: John Wisden & Co. ISBN 978-1-4081-4084-0.

Sporting positions
Preceded by Geoff Keith; Barry Reed (interim 1976)	Hampshire cricket coach 1977–1991	Succeeded by Tim Tremlett
