= Mervyn Burden =

English cricketer

- Mervyn Burden in 1958

Personal information
- Full name: Mervyn Derek Burden
- Born: 4 October 1930; Southampton, Hampshire, England
- Died: 9 November 1987 (aged 57); Whitchurch, Hampshire, England
- Batting: Right-handed
- Bowling: Right-arm off-break

Domestic team information
- Years: Team
- 1953–1963: Hampshire

Career statistics
Competition	First-class
Matches	174
Runs scored	901
Batting average	6.82
100s/50s	–/1
Top score	51
Balls bowled	29,210
Wickets	481
Bowling average	26.11
5 wickets in innings	23
10 wickets in match	4
Best bowling	8/38
Catches/stumpings	76/–
- Source: Cricinfo, 10 December 2009

Mervyn Derek Burden (4 October 1930 – 9 November 1987) was an English first-class cricketer.

== Early life ==
Burden was born at Southampton in October 1930, being educated there at King Edward VI School. The school was evacuated to Poole during the Second World War, where he excelled at football more than cricket. While practicing in the cricket nets at the Cunliffe-Owen Aircraft factory in March 1947, in order to maintain his fitness for football, he was spotted by Hampshire coach Sam Staples and their captain and secretary Desmond Eagar, who recommended him for a trial at the County Ground. He reportedly turned up to his trial with no pads or bat. Bowling medium pace, his first delivery of his trial (bowled at Neil McCorkell) flew over the nets without bouncing and shattered a dining-room window. His misfortune continued on the second day of his trial, when he was asked to assist groundsman Ernie Knights, having been struck on the ankle by a shot from Johnny Arnold, only to kick a bucket of whiting all over the square. He subsequently spent two years on National Service.

== Cricket career ==
Burden would eventually turn to off spin bowling following a discussion with Staples successor, Arthur Holt, about Hampshire's lack of a spin-bowler following a number of retirements. He made his debut for Hampshire in first-class cricket against Worcestershire at Worcester in the 1953 County Championship, with him making a second appearance that season against Surrey. He established himself in the Hampshire side following a match against Leicestershire, in which he took figures of 7 for 48. He played regularly for Hampshire throughout the 1950s in partnership with fellow spinner Peter Sainsbury, taking over fifty wickets in a season in 1955, 1957, and 1958. He received his county cap in 1955, the same season in which he took 70 wickets at an average of 21.75. Described as a genuine number eleven, he made one half century in 1960 when he came in as a nightwatchman against Warwickshire. The following season, he played an important role in helping Hampshire win their first County Championship title, taking exactly fifty wickets at an average of 22.92; these included his career best bowling figures of 8 for 38 against Somerset at Bournemouth. However, despite a successful season, he did not feature after July, with slow left-arm orthodox spinner Alan Wassell being preferred. He returned to make seventeen appearances in 1962, taking 65 wickets, albeit at a higher average of 30.38. In 1963, he made just three appearances in the County Championship, but did take 6 for 84 in his penultimate match against Gloucestershire. He was subsequently released from his contract in August of that year to take up an appointment outside of cricket. In 174 first-class matches, Burden took 481 wickets at an average of 26.11; he took 23 five wicket hauls and took ten-wickets in a match on four occasions.

Burden was popular among both players and spectators and was included in a 2005 list of popular Hampshire cricket figures. His obituary in Wisden declared, "The value of such a man is not to be estimated in figures." Tony Lewis said of him that "his humour was never extinguished by failure" and noted that John Arlott called Burden "salt of the cricketing earth". Arlott himself devoted a chapter to Burden in his book, John Arlott's Book of Cricketers. Burden died suddenly at Whitchurch on 9 November 1987, aged 57.
