= Mike Barnard (sportsman) =

English cricketer and footballer (1933–2018)

- Barnard in 1958

Personal information
- Full name: Henry Michael Barnard
- Born: 18 July 1933; Portsmouth, Hampshire, England
- Died: 18 December 2018 (aged 85); Southampton, Hampshire, England
- Batting: Right-handed
- Bowling: Right-arm medium

Domestic team information
- Years: Team
- 1952–1966: Hampshire

Career statistics
Competition	First-class	List A
Matches	276	9
Runs scored	9,314	315
Batting average	22.07	39.37
100s/50s	6/46	–/2
Top score	128*	98
Balls bowled	1,113	–
Wickets	16	–
Bowling average	35.18	–
5 wickets in innings	–	–
10 wickets in match	–	–
Best bowling	3/35	–
Catches/stumpings	312/–	8/–
Source: Mike Barnard at Cricinfo
30 August 2009
Association football career
- Position: Inside forward
Senior career*
Years	Team	Apps	(Gls)
1950–1951	Gosport Borough		
1951–1959	Portsmouth	116	(24)
1959–1963	Chelmsford City		
1963–1964	Poole Town		
- * Club domestic league appearances and goals

Henry Michael Barnard (18 July 1933 – 18 December 2018) was an English first-class cricketer and professional footballer. As a cricketer, he represented Hampshire in 276 first-class matches and played an important part in helping the county win their first County Championship in 1961. As a predominantly middle order batsman, he scored over 9,000 runs for Hampshire in a career that spanned from 1952 to 1966. In football, he made 116 appearances in the Football League as an inside forward for Portsmouth, scoring 24 goals. He also played non-League football for Gosport Borough, Chelmsford City, and Poole Town.

== Early life ==
Henry Michael Barnard was born on 18 July 1933 in Portsmouth, Hampshire, the youngest of four sons of the hotelier and garage proprietor Robert Barnard, and his wife, Ada. His was a second generation Jewish family, descended from the Rabbi Daniel Barnard, who had emigrated to England from Prague in 1782. During the Second World War, he moved with his family to the nearby town of Havant to escape the threat posed by the Portsmouth Blitz. He was educated at The Portsmouth Grammar School, where he was noted as being a talented sportsman in cricket, football, and rugby union. He won several local and national accolades in all three sports as a youth, and played rugby for Hampshire at under-19 level.

== Cricket career ==
=== Early years ===
Barnard was a member of Hampshire's first colts side in 1949, coached by Arthur Holt. (Note: Hampshire's youth team was founded in 1949 by their coach, Arthur Holt. It was known by the echoic expression "Holt's Colts".) He joined the staff at the county in 1951, prior to embarking on two years of national service in the British Army as a quartermaster. He made his debut in first-class cricket for Hampshire in the 1952 County Championship against Glamorgan at Swansea, with a second appearance following in the 1953 County Championship against Warwickshire at Portsmouth; in the latter, he made a pair.

Barnard's breakthrough into the first team came under unusual circumstances in 1954. When he was attending the opening day of a County Championship match at Southampton against Middlesex, the club received a phone call from off-spinner Charles Knott to say he had been detained at his fishmonger's business and was unable to play in the match, resulting in Barnard being called into the Hampshire team. He came in to bat when Hampshire were 48 for 8, with batting having proven difficult. Barnard launched a counter-attack against the Middlesex attack, top-scoring with a fluent 39 runs. He added 24 runs in their second innings, and although they lost the match, his performance gained him a regular place in the first eleven. In their following match against the touring Pakistanis at Portsmouth, Barnard scored his maiden first-class century with an unbeaten 101 runs in Hampshire's second innings; his innings was watched by his brother and father. He was the first Englishman to score a century against the Pakistanis, on what was their first tour to England. He made 14 first-class appearances in 1954, scoring 394 runs at an average of 21.88. By the 1955 season, he had established himself in the middle order, becoming an integral member of an increasingly successful team. His 27 first-class appearances in 1955 yielded him 908 runs, averaging 21.11, with him making a second century; he also earned his county cap during the season.

Barnard played 22 games the following season. He made his highest first-class score, an unbeaten 128 runs against the Marylebone Cricket Club at Lord's, aggregating 600 runs across the season at an average of 20. Over the next two seasons his batting returns were modest. In 1957, his 21 matches returned him 800 runs at an average of 25, whilst in 1958 he scored 720 runs from 29 matches, averaging 16.36. His football commitments delayed the start of his season in 1959, with Portsmouth refusing to release him until 9 May, resulting in him being deemed to have had insufficient practice. As a result, he played 11 matches across the season, scoring 488 runs at an average of 25.68; against the touring Indians in August, he top-scored in Hampshire's first innings with 128 runs, equalling his highest score.

=== County Championship winner ===
In the 1960 season, Barnard scored 640 runs from 23 matches, averaging 18.82. He had a poor start to the 1961 season, scoring just 154 runs in ten innings and lost his place in the team. However, a back injury to captain Colin Ingleby-Mackenzie saw him return, with Barnard encountering his best form as a player. Hampshire spent most of the season competing with defending champions Yorkshire. Barnard played a series of noteworthy innings, most notably scoring an aggressive 114 runs against Warwickshire in mid-August, that sent Hampshire top of the table. He followed this with half-centuries against Nottinghamshire and Leicestershire. In a title-deciding match against Derbyshire at Bournemouth, he scored 61 runs and shared in a partnership of 99 runs with Peter Sainsbury, helping set a target which Derbyshire were unable to reach, giving Hampshire their first County Championship title. He scored 661 runs and averaged 28.73 in 1961, the highest average of his career.

Encouraged by Hampshire's Championship success and his own personal form, Barnard had his most successful season in 1962. He surpassed a thousand runs in a season for the only time, scoring 1,114 runs at an average of 27.17 from 29 matches. Despite his personal success, Hampshire were unable to repeat their Championship success, finishing in tenth place. His good form continued into the 1963 season, with 980 runs at an average of 25.12 from 27 matches. He was a member of Hampshire's team for their inaugural appearance in List A one-day cricket against Derbyshire in the 1963 Gillette Cup, with him making 98 runs batting at number three. The following season, he scored 814 first-class runs, averaging 23.94; he scored the final century of his career in 1964, with an "attractive" 123 runs opening the batting against the touring Australians. He played twice in the Gillette Cup, scoring a half-century against minor county Wiltshire in the competition's first round. In the 1965 season he made 26 first-class appearances, scoring 958 runs at an average of 21.28. He also made three appearances in the Gillette Cup.

His form fell away dramatically in the 1966 season, with 233 runs at an average of 14.56 from 11 matches, and he found himself out of the team by mid-July. He played two matches in the 1966 Gillette Cup. He played exclusively for the Second Eleven during the 1967 season and had a testimonial season in 1968, but did not play first-class or one-day cricket after 1966.

=== Playing style and statistics ===
Barnard made 276 first-class and nine one-day appearances. He was described as a "strongly built and powerful right-handed [batsman]" who commanded "elegant and economical" movement. He was particularly strong off the back foot, and was always keen to seize on any deliveries bowled just short of a length.

In first-class matches, he scored 9,314 runs at an average of 22.07; he made six centuries, alongside 46 half-centuries. He was described as a fielder of "high class", particularly close-in to the batsman and at slip. His 312 catches are, as of 2026, the tenth-highest by a Hampshire fielder (excluding wicket-keepers). He was, on occasion, used as a part-time medium pace bowler, taking 16 first-class wickets. In nine one-day matches, he scored 315 runs at an average of 39.37, while also taking eight catches.

The Daily Telegraph noted that he did not score the amount of runs during his career that he perhaps should have, with The Independent echoing a similar sentiment by suggesting that he had not fully fulfilled the "rich promise" of his early years. Barnard himself was pragmatic about his shortcomings, admitting that he suffered from occasional lapses in concentration.

== Football ==
=== Playing career ===
Barnard started his football career in 1950, playing as an inside forward in non-League football for Gosport Borough. He signed for First Division club Portsmouth in August 1951 after being spotted playing for Gosport. In Portsmouth, he joined a club which had won the First Division in the 1948–49 and 1949–50 seasons. Barnard made his Portsmouth debut on 26 December 1953 in a 1–1 draw against Tottenham Hotspur in the 1953–54 First Division, and helped Portsmouth finish third the following season, with him making 30 appearances that season and scoring five goals.

One of Barnard's best performances came in a 5–4 home victory over Arsenal in the 1958–59 First Division, in which he scored a goal. The 1958–59 season ultimately saw Portsmouth relegated to the Second Division. His professional career came to an end after the 1958–59 season, after he had been injured in a tackle, with Barnard leaving Portsmouth to focus on his cricket career. He scored 26 goals from 123 first-team appearances in all competitions, with 24 from 116 in the Football League. He continued to play football, albeit at non-League level, signing for Chelmsford City of the Southern Football League in 1959, with the club able to match Portsmouth's £20 a week wage. He once scored 4 goals in a match for Chelmsford, doing so in their 7–1 victory against Gravesend and Northfleet. His last season in football came with Poole Town in 1963–64.

=== Football career statistics ===
Appearances and goals by club, season and competition
Club	Season	League			FA Cup		Total	
Club	Season	Division	Apps	Goals	Apps	Goals	Apps	Goals
Portsmouth	1953–54	First Division	16	5	3	1	19	6
Portsmouth	1954–55	First Division	30	5	1	0	31	5
Portsmouth	1955–56	First Division	26	7	2	0	28	7
Portsmouth	1956–57	First Division	12	2	0	0	12	2
Portsmouth	1957–58	First Division	17	4	1	1	18	5
Portsmouth	1958–59	First Division	15	1	0	0	15	1
Career total			116	24	7	2	123	26

== Later life ==
After the end of his first-class cricket career, Barnard became a mature student at King Alfred's College in Winchester. He intended to go into coaching following his playing career, and was earmarked to coach the Second Eleven and become Hampshire head coach. However, while on a cricket tour of British Army bases in West Germany in April 1969, he was seriously injured when his minibus driver fell asleep at the wheel. The resultant crash caused serious head injuries, broke his neck and gave him severe spinal injuries, the latter of which afflicted him for the rest of his life. He recovered sufficiently to coach cricket at the Warsash School of Navigation, while also working as a commentator for BBC Radio Solent and Southampton Hospitals. He later organised reunions between Portsmouth footballers and Hampshire cricketers.

Barnard died on 18 December 2018 in Southampton following a stroke. His wife, Theresa, predeceased him in 2001. He was survived by their two sons and one daughter. He is considered to be the greatest all-round sportsman the city of Portsmouth has ever produced. Paying tribute following his death, then Hampshire chairman Rod Bransgrove said "he was an indelible part of Hampshire cricket history".

== See also ==
- List of select Jewish cricketers

== Works cited ==
- Booth, Lawrence (2019). The Shorter Wisden 2019. London: Bloomsbury Publishing. ISBN 978-1-4729-6387-1.
- Neasom, Mike; Cooper, Mick; Robinson, Doug (1984). Pompey: The History of Portsmouth Football Club. Horndean: Milestone Publications. ISBN 978-0-9038-5250-0.
