= Tom Mottram =

English cricketer (1945–2019)

Personal information
- Full name: Thomas James Mottram
- Born: 7 September 1945; Liverpool, Lancashire, England
- Died: 26 July 2019 (aged 73); England
- Nickname: Pink Panther
- Height: 6 ft 4 in (1.93 m)
- Batting: Right-handed
- Bowling: Right-arm medium

Domestic team information
- Years: Team
- 1972–1977: Hampshire

Career statistics
Competition	First-class	List A
Matches	35	83
Runs scored	95	48
Batting average	5.58	3.42
100s/50s	0/0	0/0
Top score	15*	7*
Balls bowled	6,013	3,853
Wickets	111	135
Bowling average	24.11	18.69
5 wickets in innings	4	1
10 wickets in match	0	0
Best bowling	6/63	5/21
Catches/stumpings	11/–	16/–
- Source: Cricinfo, 24 December 2009

Thomas James Mottram (7 September 1945 – 26 July 2019) was an English first-class cricketer who was associated with Hampshire County Cricket Club's 1973 County Championship winning team.

== Life and cricket career ==
Mottram was born at Liverpool in September 1945. He played club cricket for Liverpool Cricket Club, before coming to the attention of Lancashire County Cricket Club, for whom he would play a handful of second eleven matches for. His profession as an architect took Mottram south to Poole, and in 1972 he made his debut in first-class cricket for Hampshire against the touring Australians at Southampton. Following a handful of appearances in 1972, Mottram formed a seam bowling attack for the 1973 season alongside Bob Herman and Mike Taylor, which was complimented by spinners Peter Sainsbury and David O'Sullivan. Hampshire's bowling attack, often considered its weak link, defined expectations to guide Hampshire to the 1973 County Championship. In seventeen matches in 1973, he took 57 wickets at an average of exactly 22. His performances and personality during their championship winning season made him a cult figure at Hampshire. Despite his success in the County Championship, Hampshire signed Andy Roberts for the 1973 season, whose presence curtailed his appearances in first-class cricket; he made no first-class appearances in 1974, and just seven each in 1975 and 1976. Described as a "lanky seamer" who was able to generate deceptive bounce, he took 111 wickets at an average of 24.11, from 35 first-class matches; he took four five wicket hauls, with best figures of 6 for 63.

Mottram played most of his cricket for Hampshire in List A one-day cricket, having made his one-day debut against Somerset at Glastonbury in the 1971 John Player League. He played one-day cricket for Hampshire until 1977, and was a member of their 1975 John Player League winning team. In one-day cricket, he took 135 wickets at an average of 18.69; he took one five wicket haul, producing figures of 5 for 21. He was described by cricket writer Pat Symes as someone who "could not bat" and was an "atrocious fielder", the former reflected by his batting average across both formats which was under six, and that he only reached double figures on three occasions in first-class cricket and never in one-day cricket. Mottram retired from the game at the end of the 1977 season, returning to his architectural practice. His teammates nicknamed him 'Pink Panther', due to him supposedly resembling the character due to his height and slim build. Mottram died in July 2019; curiously, it was theorised by the Hampshire cricket historian Dave Allen that Mottram might have been older than he claimed, in order to gain a contract at Hampshire. This theory may have been correct, with Companies House recording his date of birth as occurring in September 1939.
