= Geoff Keith =

English cricketer

- Keith in 1967

Personal information
- Full name: Geoffrey Leyden Keith
- Born: 19 November 1937; Winchester, Hampshire, England
- Died: 26 December 1975 (aged 38); Southampton, Hampshire, England
- Batting: Right-handed
- Bowling: Right-arm off-break

Domestic team information
- Years: Team
- 1959–1961: Somerset
- 1962–1967: Hampshire
- 1968/69: Western Province

Career statistics
Competition	First-class	List A
Matches	77	5
Runs scored	2,108	67
Batting average	19.16	13.40
100s/50s	1/8	–/–
Top score	101*	33
Balls bowled	1,050	0
Wickets	13	–
Bowling average	43.00	–
5 wickets in innings	–	–
10 wickets in match	–	–
Best bowling	4/49	–
Catches/stumpings	79/–	3/–
- Source: Cricinfo, 15 December 2008

Geoffrey Leyden Keith (19 November 1937 — 26 December 1975) was an English cricketer and cricket coach. As a player, he played first-class cricket for Somerset, Hampshire and in South Africa with Western Province. Beginning his career with Somerset in 1959, Keith moved to Hampshire in 1962 where he made sixty appearances in first-class cricket, and played in Hampshire's inaugural List A one-day match in the 1963 Gillette Cup. He moved to South Africa in 1967, where he took up coaching. He returned to Hampshire in 1971 to become their coach, a role he maintained until his death from leukemia in December 1975.

== Cricket career ==
=== Somerset ===
Keith was born in Winchester in November 1937. He grew up in the West Country, where he played his early club cricket for Taunton Deane. Keith made his debut in first-class cricket for Somerset against Cambridge University at Fenner's in May 1959, with him making a further appearance that season against the touring Indians. He made his first County Championship appearance in the 1961 County Championship against Yorkshire. That season he made ten first-class appearances during the first half of the season, scoring 220 runs at an average of 13.75. He featured just three times in the 1961 County Championship, and was not retained by Someset at the end of the season. In fifteen first-class appearances for Somerset, he scored 319 runs at an average of 12.76, but never passed fifty.

=== Move to Hampshire ===
In April 1962, Keith joined his native county, Hampshire. He played once for Hampshire in 1962, against Oxford University at Oxford, scoring 82 in Hampshire's first innings of the match. He played only three first-class matches in 1963, but did play in Hampshire's inaugural List A one-day match against Derbyshire in the Gillette Cup. In 1964, long-standing opening batsman Jimmy Gray was available for only the second half of the season, and Keith stood in for him for the first two months of the season, opening with Roy Marshall, though he failed to retain his place for long once Gray was available again. In seventeen first-class matches that season, he scored 653 runs at an average of 21.76. He made nineteen further first-class appearances in 1965, but at a different batting position: Barry Reed and Mike Barnard became Marshall's more regular opening partners, while Keith resumed batting in the middle order. He scored 561 runs at an average of 26.75 across the season, but did score the only century of his first-class career when he made an unbeaten 101 against the touring South Africans, reaching his century by hitting a six into the pavilion in the last over of the day, with Wisden remarking that up to that point he had played a rather stubborn innings. He made a further two one-day appearances in the 1964 Gillette Cup, against Wiltshire and Warwickshire.

Keith found his first eleven opportunities limited in 1966, making seven first-class appearances in the first half of the season, alongside a single appearance in the Gillette Cup against Lincolnshire; the following season, he made twelve first-class appearances, scoring 294 runs at an average of 17.29, making two half centuries. He made a further one-day appearance in the 1967 Gillette Cup against Lincolnshire at Basingstoke. Keith asked to be released by Hampshire at the end of the 1967 season, in order to move to South Africa. For Hampshire, he made 60 first-class appearances, scoring 1,775 runs at an average of 21.38. With his part-time off break bowling, he took 12 wickets at a bowling average of 45.83, with best figures of 4 for 49. In South Africa, Keith made two first-class appearances for Western Province against Orange Free State and Natal B in the 1968–69 Currie Cup, which bought his first-class career to a conclusion.

== Coaching career and death ==
In South Africa, Keith obtained a pilot's licence. He kept his interest in the game by taking up coaching, obtaining an advanced MCC coaching certificate. He returned to England in 1971 to become Hampshire's coach, succeeding Leo Harrison, who had been expected to be replaced by Mike Barnard, however Barnard was involved in a serious car injury and was unable to take up the role. In his first season as Hampshire coach, the Second Eleven won the Second XI Championship, and were unbeaten in 1972 and 1973. The high levels of fitness and the high standards of fielding which he instilled into his players were pivotal in an unfancied Hampshire side winning the 1973 County Championship. During the latter part of the 1974 season, he was diagnosed with leukemia. He succumbed to the disease on 26 December 1975, aged 38. He was succeeded as Hampshire coach by Peter Sainsbury.

Sporting positions
Preceded by Leo Harrison	Hampshire cricket coach 1971–1975	Succeeded by Peter Sainsbury
