= Charles Knott =

English cricketer

Personal information
- Full name: Charles James Knott
- Born: 26 November 1914; Southampton, Hampshire, England
- Died: 27 February 2003 (aged 88); Southampton, Hampshire, England
- Nickname: Mr Cricket
- Batting: Right-handed
- Bowling: Right-arm medium Right-arm off-break
- Relatives: Richard Lewis (son-in-law)

Domestic team information
- Years: Team
- 1938–1954: Hampshire
- 1951–1957: Marylebone Cricket Club

Career statistics
Competition	First-class
Matches	173
Runs scored	1,023
Batting average	6.95
100s/50s	–/–
Top score	27
Balls bowled	33,962
Wickets	676
Bowling average	23.32
5 wickets in innings	47
10 wickets in match	8
Best bowling	8/26
Catches/stumpings	57/–
- Source: Cricinfo, 21 February 2010

Charles James Knott (26 November 1914 — 27 February 2003) was an English first-class cricketer, cricket administrator, and motorcycle speedway promoter. Knott began his first-class cricket career with Hampshire as a right-arm medium pace bowler, before switching to bowl off-spin from his third first-class match. Knott went onto be considered one of the best amateur spinners in England, and came close on a few occasions to being capped at Test level for England. Playing in 173 first-class matches between 1938 and 1957, he took 676 wickets, with 47 five wicket hauls. He remained connected to Hampshire following his retirement from playing, holding the post of chairman of cricket from 1967 to 1988. During that period he was instrumental in attracting some of the best young cricketers to Hampshire, and oversaw their second County Championship title in 1973.

Alongside his father, Charles, who was a promininent businessman in Southampton, Knott helped run the Banister Court Stadium and promote its motorcycle speedway team, the Southampton Saints until 1963, when the team was disbanded. In 1959, the attention of the Knott's had turned to the Poole Pirates in Dorset, whom he would promote until 1979. Knott is considered one of the sports most important figures during the 1960s and 1970s. He would later commentate on the sport.

== Early life ==
Knott was born in Southampton in November 1914. He was educated at Taunton's School, where he developed first as a footballer before turning to cricket. On leaving school he went into his father's fishmonger's business; his father, Charles Knott senior, was an important figure in Southampton during the 1930s, having built the Banister Court Stadium for greyhound racing and motor-cycle racing alongside the county cricket ground. Within a year or so of going into the business, Charles junior was in charge of the fishmonger's; he would later serve as president of the Southampton Fish Trades Association. Despite his work for the family business, he found time for cricket on Wednesday and Saturday afternoons, and on the encouragement of Don Roper he began playing for Deanery Cricket Club in the Southampton League, where he soon began to produce excellent performances bowling medium-pace. He also helped Phil Mead's son to operate the scoreboard at the county cricket ground.

== Cricket career ==
=== Pre-war beginning ===
Following strong performances as a medium pace bowler in club cricket, Knott received a phone call from Hampshire in July 1938 inviting him to play against Kent at Canterbury in the County Championship. He got off to a promising start, dismissing Arthur Fagg to claim his maiden first-class wicket, and had it not been for a series of dropped catches off his bowling, Knott might have ended with better bowling figures than his 1 for 92. Knott made nine first-class appearances during his debut season, but took just one wicket in his first two matches, which prompted him to cut the pace at which he delivered the ball and add off spin to it. His change of bowling style bought him immediate success upon its introduction in his third match on a turning pitch against Gloucestershire, with Knott taking figures of 5 for 51. He ended his debut season with 21 wickets at an average of 31.33. The following season, he made seven first-class appearances, taking 35 wickets at an average of 23.31. Against Surrey at Portsmouth, he took figures of 8 for 85. He gained his county cap at the end of the 1939, but with the outbreak of the Second World War, it would be seven years before he would wear it on a cricket field.

Knott was called-up for service twice during the war, but was invalided from active service by stomach ulcers; the condition necessitated Knott to drink a glass of milk at the end of each day. He appeared in exhibition cricket matches during the war, playing for a British Empire XI. He spent the war working at the family's fish stall in the city's market.

=== Post-war playing career ===
Knott returned to play for Hampshire upon the resumption of first-class cricket in 1946. Making 25 first-class appearances throughout the season, he took 121 wickets at an average of 18.47, a tally which included twelve five wicket hauls and ten-wickets in a match on three occasions. His most notable performance during the 1946 came against the touring Indians, when he took match figures of 10 for 100. His performances established him as the leading off-spinner in county cricket, and drew the attention of the England selectors, who played Knott in the England vs The Rest Test-trial match at Canterbury that season. However, he was overlooked for England's winter Ashes tour to Australia in favour of leg spinner Peter Smith, who was adjudged to be a better batsman. The 1946 season marked Knott's first appearance in the Gentlemen v Players fixture, with him representing the Gentlemen. By the 1947 season, Knott had been appointed vice-captain to Desmond Eagar. He was beset by injury in 1947, making just thirteen first-class appearances as a result. With emergence of Jim Laker, coupled with his injury problems, Knott fell out of the reckoning for a Test cap.

Knott overcame his injury struggles ahead of the 1948 season, in which he made 23 first-class appearances. He took a hundred wickets in a season for the second time, with 101 at an average of 24.89, whilst claiming seven five wicket hauls. One of his most noteworthy performances in 1948 came against the touring Australians in June, when he took 5 for 57 to help dismiss the tourists for 117. In August, he took his career best figures to date, with 8 for 79 against Nottinghamshire. In the proceeding season he once again took 101 wickets, this time at an average of 26.90, whilst taking six five wicket hauls. In July and August 1949, he deputised as captain in place of the injured Eagar in three matches. During the 1950 season Knott once again passed a hundred wickets for the season, taking 111 from 30 matches at an average of 23.19, with seven five wicket hauls. Playing his second match for the Gentlemen against the Players in 1950, he took a hat-trick when the Players were only 36 runs from victory, which steered the match toward a draw. Having taken over a hundred wickets for the fourth time in five seasons, talk of his inclusion in the England team once again began, but his inclusion was not forthcoming, which Wisden proffered was again due to what was perceived as his inferior batting and fielding when compared to his contemporaries.

The 1951 season was the first time since 1947 that Knott did not take a hundred wickets in a season, claiming 80 from 25 matches at an average of 23.47. In June, he took what would become his career-best figures of 8 for 26 against Cambridge University. At the beginning of the season, Knott made two appearances for the Marylebone Cricket Club (MCC) against Yorkshire and Surrey. As his career progressed, he found himself becoming more heavily involved in the running of the fishmongers business and the Banister Court Stadium, which impacted his availability and performances. As a result he made just five first-class appearances in 1952, a year in which speculation began that he could replace Eagar, who was rumoured to be returning to his native Gloucester, as captain; ultimately, Eagar would remain Hampshire captain until 1957. Following a strong start to the 1953 season, in which he had successfully taken advantage of the good spin-bowling conditions which were on offer, Knott stood on the ball during a match against Leicestershire in mid-May, injuring his foot and ruling him out for five weeks. He returned later in the season, making four appearances in July and August, and ended the season with 38 wickets at an average of 13.71. His final season came in 1954, in which he made three appearances in the County Championship; his final appearance was a mirror of his debut, with the opponents being Kent. Three years after he last played for Hampshire, Knott made a final first-class appearance for the MCC against Scotland at Aberdeen in 1957; he took 8 for 38 in the Scottish second innings.

=== Playing style and attitudes ===
As a "beguiling and flighty" off-spinner who could generate sharp turn, and who had in his repertoire several variations of delivery, which allowed Knott to take advantage of the uncovered wickets of the era. In 173 first-class matches, he took 676 wickets at an average of 23.32. He took a five wicket haul on 47 occasions and took ten-wickets in a match on eight. John Arlott proffered that Knott was the best amateur bowler in Hampshire. He was a tailend batsman, with a batting average of 6.95 and a highest score of 27 matching that. Whilst an amateur, he preferred to be considered as a non-paid professional. He broke with custom by staying in the same hotel as professionals, when traditionally amateurs and professionals sought separate accommodation. He was critical of snobbish attitudes in the game, and reacted strongly against them.

=== Role as an administrator ===
Knott initially joined the Hampshire committee, before being elected chairman of cricket in 1967. As chairman, he was influential in bringing to Hampshire a number of relatively unknown young players who would achieve great success with the club. Amongst these were Barry Richards, Gordon Greenidge, Malcolm Marshall, Andy Roberts and Robin Smith. Under his chairmanship, Hampshire won the 1973 County Championship and three one-day competitions, having struggled for consistency since their County Championship triumph in 1961. He remained Hampshire chairman until 1988, and following his retirement he remained involved with Hampshire. By 2003, he was one of only three life vice-presidents of Hampshire, and was active within the club's museum sub-committee.

== Speedway promoter ==
Alongside his father, Knott operated the Banister Court Stadium, which was used by the Southampton Saints motorcycle speedway team. He was able to attract some of the top speedway riders of the day to the Southampton Saints, including the New Zealander Barry Briggs. Knott and his father were also involved in promoting ice hockey, which was housed in a separate building on the site. The focus of the Knott's soon turned to the Poole Pirates in Dorset, where they set about redeveloping their speedway track which surrounded a football pitch by adding a greyhound racing track. As a result, the Banister Court Stadium was sold to The Rank Organisation who built housing on some of the site. A road on the development was subsequently named "Charles Knott Gardens", in tribute to both father and son. Knott continued to promote speedway at Poole until 1979. He was considered by former speedway rider Pete Smith to have been one of the most influential people in the sport, who had helped to keep it going when its survival was under threat in the 1960s.

Later in life, he commentated on speedway, providing the latest news in the sport before it was picked up by national media.

== Personal life and death ==
Following the opening of Hampshire's new home at the Rose Bowl in 2001, Knott would attend matches there when his health allowed. Knott died in Southampton on 27 February 2003. His funeral took place in the city at Highfield Church, followed by a private cremation. He was survived by his wife, Iris, and their two daughters. His son-in-law was the cricketer Richard Lewis.
