= Barry Reed (cricketer) =

English cricketer (1937–2024)

Personal information
- Full name: Barry Lindsay Reed
- Born: 17 September 1937; Southsea, Hampshire, England
- Died: 2 July 2024 (aged 86); Horndean, Hampshire, England
- Batting: Right-handed
- Bowling: Right-arm slow

Domestic team information
- Years: Team
- 1958–1972: Hampshire
- 1966: Marylebone Cricket Club

Career statistics
Competition	First-class	List A
Matches	123	32
Runs scored	4,962	900
Batting average	24.32	36.00
100s/50s	2/29	2/1
Top score	138	143*
Catches/stumpings	61/–	5/–
- Source: Cricinfo, 21 February 2010

Barry Lindsay Reed (17 September 1937 – 2 July 2024) was an English cricketer who played first-class cricket as an opening batsman for Hampshire between 1958 and 1972. Most of his appearances came between 1965 and 1970, typically partnering Roy Marshall and Barry Richards as an opening batsman. He made over 120 first-class appearances, scoring nearly 5,000 runs. He briefly coached the Hampshire Second Eleven in 1976, following the death of Hampshire coach Geoff Keith.

== Life and cricket career ==
=== Early life and cricket ===
Reed was born in Southsea in Portsmouth on 17 September 1937, but spent large parts of his childhood living with his grandparents on Hayling Island. He was educated at Winchester College, where played for the college eleven and was coached by former Test cricketer Ted Bowley. After completing his education, Reed undertook his National Service with the King's Royal Rifle Corps, being commissioned as a second lieutenant in January 1957.

Shortly after completing his education at Winchester, Reed made his debut in first-class cricket for Hampshire against Cambridge University at Portsmouth in 1958. A serious skiing injury and work interests then took Reed away from the first-class game. He would find work on a farm and at The Pub With No Name near Petersfield. His interest in cricket was rekindled when he watched the 1963 Gillette Cup final, at which point he was married and living in Brighton. He wrote to both Hampshire and Sussex seeking games, drawing a positive response from Hampshire secretary Desmond Eagar. Returning to Hampshire, he played firstly for the Second Eleven and in 1965, he joined the staff as a non-contracted player – in essence, he was an amateur two years after amateur status had been abolished.

=== Return to cricket ===
With Hampshire seeking a replacement for the retiring opening batsman Jimmy Gray, Reed opened the batting alongside Roy Marshall in the latter part of the 1965 season. In five first-class matches in 1965, he scored 223 runs at an average of 37.16, making three half centuries; on Hampshire's 1965 tour of Ireland, he made two fifties against the Irish cricket team in the first-class match between the sides. Reed established himself in the Hampshire side as Marshall's opening partner in 1966, making 27 first-class appearances and passing a thousand runs in a season for the first time. He also made his debut in List A one-day cricket against minor county Lincolnshire in the 1st Round of the Gillette Cup, with him going onto play in the 2nd Round, Quarter-Final, and Semi-Final against Kent, Surrey, and Worcestershire respectively. At the end of the season, he toured Ireland with the Marylebone Cricket Club, playing one first-class match against the Irish cricket team.

The following season, Reed made 29 first-class appearances, passing a thousand runs in consecutive seasons. His 1,136 runs came at an average of 24.17, with Reed scoring his maiden first-class century (104 runs) against Glamorgan in the County Championship. Against Northamptonshire at Portsmouth in July, Reed and Marshall shared in an opening stand of 233 runs. In one-day cricket, he made three appearances in the Gillette Cup. In the 1968 season, Reed began to open with the South African Barry Richards after Marshall had demoted himself to the middle order following a poor start to the season. He would pass a thousand runs in a season for the third and final time in 1968, scoring 1,073 runs from 30 matches at an average of 21.39, though he did not score any centuries. In one-day cricket, Reed made two appearances in the Gillette Cup, scoring a century (112 runs) in Hampshire's 2nd Round victory against minor county Bedfordshire; in the match, he shared in an opening stand of 227 runs with Marshall (140 runs).

The emergence of Richard Lewis in 1969 limited Reed's first-class appearances to 18 that year. In these, he scored 539 runs at an average of 18.58. With the introduction of the 1969 Player's County League leading to the proliferation of one-day fixtures, Reed made 11 one-day appearances, scoring 285 runs at an average of exactly 57, though his average was inflated by five not out scores. Reed made his highest first-class score against Oxford University at the beginning of the 1970 season, scoring 138 runs. With the arrival of Gordon Greenidge, another opening batsman, Reed found his opportunities in the team further limited, making just 12 first-class appearances that season; however, he ended the season with his best season average, 38.85, having scored 816 runs. In a County Championship match against Derbyshire at Chesterfield, Reed and Richards shared in an opening partnership of 180 runs. In 11 one-day appearances in 1970, Reed scored 306 runs at an average of 30.60; he made one century, an unbeaten 143 runs against minor county Buckinghamshire in the 2nd Round of the Gillette Cup. Reed would not play for Hampshire again until 1972, when he made a single one-day appearance in the John Player League against Kent.

=== Playing style and statistics ===
A bespectacled right-handed batsman, Reed made 123 appearances in first-class cricket, 122 for Hampshire. For Hampshire, he scored 4,190 runs at an average of 24.30; he made two centuries and 29 half centuries. He developed a reputation as a good fielder at cover, with Reed taking 61 catches in his career. He was said by John Arlott to have "Relished his cricket".

=== Later life and death ===
After the end of his career, Reed returned to farming. Following the death of Hampshire coach Geoff Keith in December 1975, Reed assumed some of his coaching responsibilities with the Second Eleven during the 1976 season. He later served on the Hampshire committee and managed their under-19 side. He continued to play cricket for the MCC and for the Old Wykehamists, a team of former Winchester College pupils, playing for the latter in The Cricketer Cup until 1988. Weeks prior to his death, his care home arranged a surprise visit to the Rose Bowl, where he met members of Hampshire's 2024 squad. Reed died on 2 July 2024 at his nursing home in Horndean, at the age of 86. His funeral took place at High Cross Church in Froxfield on 31 July.

== Works cited ==
- Booth, Lawrence (2025). The Obituaries from Wisden Cricketers' Almanack 2025. London: Bloomsbury Publishing. ISBN 978-1-3994-2689-3.
- Sandiford, Keith A. P. (2005). Roy Edwin Marshall: His Record Innings-by-Innings. Nottingham: ACS. ISBN 978-1-905138-15-9.
