= Jimmy Gray (English cricketer) =

English cricketer

Personal information
- Full name: James Roy Gray
- Born: 19 May 1926; Southampton, Hampshire, England
- Died: 31 October 2016 (aged 90); Southampton, Hampshire, England
- Batting: Right-handed
- Bowling: Right-arm medium

Domestic team information
- Years: Team
- 1948–1966: Hampshire
- 1954–1959: Marylebone Cricket Club

Career statistics
| Competition | First-class | List A |
|---|---|---|
| Matches | 458 | 6 |
| Runs scored | 22,650 | 70 |
| Batting average | 30.73 | 17.50 |
| 100s/50s | 30/120 | –/– |
| Top score | 213* | 22 |
| Balls bowled | 33,086 | 322 |
| Wickets | 457 | 7 |
| Bowling average | 30.01 | 24.85 |
| 5 wickets in innings | 11 | – |
| 10 wickets in match | 1 | – |
| Best bowling | 7/52 | 3/28 |
| Catches/stumpings | 352/– | 2/– |
Source: Jimmy Gray at Cricinfo
12 April 2023
Association football career
- Position: Right-back
Senior career*
| Years | Team | Apps | (Gls) |
| 1946–1951 | Southampton | 0 | (0) |
| 1951–1954 | Bedford Town | | |
| 1954–???? | Salisbury City | | (0) |
- * Club domestic league appearances and goals

James 'Jimmy' Roy Gray (19 May 1926 – 31 October 2016) was an English first-class cricketer who played as an all-rounder for Hampshire. After beginning his sporting career as a footballer on the books of Arsenal, Gray decided to pursue a career as a professional cricketer. He debuted for Hampshire in 1948, and from 1954 he would form one of the most successful opening partnerships in county cricket with the West Indian Roy Marshall, one which was to last for twelve years. He was a member of the Hampshire side which won their first County Championship in 1961. For Hampshire, Gray made 453 first-class appearances and scored 22,450 runs, placing him fourth amongst Hampshire's all-time highest runscorers in first-class cricket. As a right-arm medium bowler, he would take 451 wickets for Hampshire. Following his retirement in 1966, Gray taught at an independent school in Romsey, and later served as chairman of the Hampshire cricket committee into the 1990s.

== Early life and football career ==
Gray was born in Southampton in May 1926. He was educated in the city at the King Edward VI Grammar School. He was evacuated to Poole during the Second World War, where he took up football. After some success as a right-back, he was signed by Arsenal at the start of the 1946–47 season, alongside Ralph Prouton. He would spend four years on the staff at Arsenal, but would not make any first team appearances. During his time at Arsenal, he was afforded time off to study at University College London. He played non-League football for Bedford Town in 1952, and would later sign for Salisbury in June 1954.

== Cricket career ==
=== Early career ===
During the summer months, Gray played club cricket in Southampton for Deanery. As his professional football career failed to progress, Gray began to focus more on cricket. He made his debut in first-class cricket for Hampshire, whilst still on the books at Arsenal, against the Combined Services at Aldershot in June 1948. He made his County Championship debut in the same month, against Leicestershire. During his debut first-class season, he scored 249 runs. He made just two appearances in the 1949 County Championship. Under Hampshire's policy of giving young players opportunities, Gray was bought into the Hampshire side alongside Reginald Dare in May 1950. Batting in the middle order, he made 22 appearances in 1950, but struggled for form and scored just 498 runs at an average of 15.09. Under the tutelage of Neville Rogers during the winter his game improved, and he made his breakthrough season in 1951. He made his maiden first-class century, an unbeaten 109 against Cambridge University. He passed a thousand runs in a season for the first time in 1951, scoring 1,332 runs at an average of 34.15. Hampshire also began to utilise his medium pace bowling during the 1951 season, with Gray taking 23 wickets.

He first opened the batting late in the 1952 season, partnering Rogers and replacing the combination of Ralph Prouton and Clifford Walker. His all-round abilities came to the fore during the 1952 season. He scored 1,634 runs at an 32.68, with two centuries. With the ball, he took 48 wickets at a bowling average of 33.16 and claimed three five wicket hauls during the season. His all-round abilities were epitomised against Nottinghamshire in July, when he took figures of 7 for 56 (and overall match figures of 11 for 158), helping to set a victory target for Hampshire of 143 runs with around a hundred minutes left in the match. Gray scored a quick half century (51 runs), helped Hampshire achieve a seven wickets victory. His good form led The Times to proclaim Gray as "one of the most-improved young cricketers [in county cricket]". He passed a thousand runs in a season for the third successive year in 1953, with 1,660 at an average 33.87 from 31 appearances. His top-score during the season was 161 runs, patiently made against Northamptonshire at Bournemouth in June. He also took 63 wickets, the highest seasonal total of his entire career, at an average of 23.81. He again passed a thousand runs for the season in 1954 with 1,305 runs at an average of 27.76, in addition to taking 43 wickets at an average of 23.95. Gray was selected to play for the Marylebone Cricket Club (MCC) against Yorkshire at Lord's in May 1954.

=== Partnership with Marshall ===
With the retirement of Rogers after the 1954 season, the West Indian Roy Marshall was elevated to open the batting alongside Gray, having just completed his two-year qualification period ahead of the 1955 season. The pair combined well during their first season together, helping guide Hampshire to third place in the County Championship — then their highest finish. Gray himself scored 1,189 runs across 30 matches during the season, though his average dropped to 22.43, and he failed to score a century. He did however take 50 wickets during the 1955 season at an average of 20.50, with career-best figures of 7 for 52 against Glamorgan at Swansea. Gray's individual form with the bat recovered the following season, with him 1,572 runs from 31 matches at an average of 33.44; he made his first hundred of the season against Middlesex, in doing so he became the second Hampshire playing to reach the landmark of a thousand runs for the season in 1956. He would take 50 wickets in a season for the final time in 1956, with 54 at an average of 22.94. During the 1957 season, Gray played for the MCC against Surrey at Lord's, and for an England XI against the Commonwealth XI at the Hastings Festival. After the season, in which he again scored over a thousand runs, there was discussion of Gray succeeding the retiring Desmond Eagar as captain, through Eagar was firmly of the belief that Gray had no interest in succeeding him; Colin Ingleby-Mackenzie would assume the captaincy for the 1958 season.

Gray broke his right arm in a car accident in December, causing him to miss the start of the 1958 season; as a consequence, Hampshire utilised five different opening batsmen to partner Marshall. Having returned to action in late May, the resumption of Gray and Marshall's partnership proved pivotal in guiding Hampshire to a second-placed finish in the 1958 County Championship, surpassing their third-placed finish from 1955. Despite missing the beginning of the season, he still passed a thousand runs for the season and took 22 wickets, including 6 for 31 in a "hostile" spell against Somerset on a dry Taunton pitch in June. Gray passed 2,000 runs in a season for the first time in 1959, scoring 2,170 at an average of 41.73 from 31 matches. His six centuries were to be the most that he would score in a single season during his career, with his unbeaten 176 against Nottinghamshire in July the highest score of his career to that point. During the season, Gray and Marshall established a Hampshire record partnership for the first wicket, with an opening stand of 214 runs against Gloucestershire, which surpassed Gloucestershire's entire first innings by 45 runs. In August whilst playing against Surrey at Portsmouth, Gray was hit on the head by a delivery from fast bowler Peter Loader, necessitating a visit to hospital for stitches and resulted in him missing Hampshire's next match against Worcestershire. During the 1959 season, he made his third and final appearance for the MCC, playing against Oxford University in June.

Gray scored 1,841 runs at an average of 34.09 during the 1960 season, making three centuries. He was afforded his benefit match against Middlesex at Portsmouth in August, with fundraising for his benefit raising £4,350. His benefit match was notable for Gray and Marshall surpassing their record partnership for the first wicket which they had established in 1959, with the pair putting on 249 runs in Hampshire's first innings. His all-round abilities were important factors in Hampshire's historic maiden County Championship title in 1961. Gray scored 1,950 runs in the County Championship, at an average of 32.28; although he only made two centuries throughout the season, he crucially contributed 12 half centuries. It was noted by Keith Sandiford that he provided consistent support to Marshall throughout the season, whilst Ingleby-Mackenzie was of the belief that Hampshire possessed in Gray and Marshall the strongest opening pair in county cricket in 1961. In all first-class matches during 1961, Gray passed 2,000 runs for the second time. After two quiet seasons with the ball in 1959 and 1960, with his bowling being rarely utilised, Gray took 31 wickets at an average of 29.38 in the County Championship.

=== Later career ===
Hampshire could not repeat their 1961 success the following season, finishing tenth in the County Championship. Despite this, Gray had his most successful season in terms of runs scored, making 2,224 at an average of 40.43 from 32 matches; he was Hampshire's leading run-scorer in the 1962 Championship, with 2,196 runs and topped their batting averages. He scored the only double-century of his career during the 1962 season, making an unbeaten 213 runs against Derbyshire at Portsmouth; this was one of five centuries that Gray would make in 1962. The following season, he scored a thousand runs for the season for twelfth consecutive season, though his batting form fell away when compared to previous seasons, with Gray averaging just 20.53 from 29 matches. Having struggled with the ball in 1962 (5 wickets at an average of 84.40), he took 25 wickets in 1963, though his average remained high at 39.24. He was a member of Hampshire's team for their inaugural appearance in List A one-day cricket against Derbyshire in the 1963 Gillette Cup.

During the winter that followed the 1963 season, Gray took up a teaching appointment at the independent Stroud School in Romsey as its deputy-headmaster, a move which necessitated him to play part-time for Hampshire thereafter. His teaching commitments saw him miss several matches during the 1964 season, with Gray not featuring in the County Championship until July. He would make seventeen appearances for Hampshire during the remainder of the season, scoring 908 runs at an average of 32.42, making two centuries. With Marshall's appearances restricted due to injury, he found himself partnering Geoff Keith in several matches. With Marshall's return, Gray would find himself moved to the middle order, with Mike Barnard being preferred to open. He would make six first-class appearances in 1965, and played in all three of Hampshire's one-day matches in the 1965 Gillette Cup. The following season he made five first-class appearances, and played twice in the 1966 Gillette Cup. In November 1966, he announced his retirement from playing.

=== Playing style and records ===
For Hampshire, he scored 22,450 runs at an average of 30.83 from 453 first-class matches. He made 30 centuries and 119 half centuries. In terms of runs-scored, he has the fourth-highest first-class aggregate amongst Hampshire batsmen, behind Phil Mead, Marshall, and George Brown. With Marshall, Gray put on 33 opening partnerships of over 100 runs. Playing in the nascent years of one-day cricket, he scored 70 runs from six matches, with a top-score of 22 runs. As opening partners, Gray and Marshall were seen to complement one another well; Marshall was by nature an attacking batsman, whilst Gray was more circumspect, possessing what Wisden described as a "grooved defensive technique". He was often content to give Marshall the strike, but in the event that Marshall was dismissed early, he was capable of assuming his mantle. Such was his low-risk approach to batting, John Arlott opined "It would violate the laws of cricketing nature if Jimmy Gray were out to a careless or untidy stroke". Wisden considers Gray to be the most prolific batsman born within Hampshire.

Gray was utilised as a first change bowler, often replacing Derek Shackleton once he had completed his opening spell. It was observed by the Post Green 'un (Bristol) during a match against Gloucestershire in 1958, that he possessed the ability to "move the ball appreciably through the air", with Glamorgan's Tony Lewis remarking how Gray's inswinger's posed a challenge for wicket-keeper Leo Harrison. For Hampshire, he took 451 wickets at an average of 30.02, and claimed five wickets in an innings on eleven occasions. An adept fielder close the wicket, he took 352 catches in his first-class career. He was described by Hampshire cricket historian Dave Allen as "a highly intelligent if sometimes cautious thinker about the game", when referencing his approach to the game.

== Later life ==
In retirement, Gray and Peter Sainsbury took over the Holt and Haskell shop in Shirley; the shop had been established by Arthur Holt in 1946. During the 1980s, he coached the Hampshire Under-19 "Colts" side; during his playing career, he had coached alongside Fred Titmus in South Africa at the University of Cape Town. He later became chairman of the cricket committee at Hampshire into the 1990s, where he was supported by Neville Rogers. Gray died in Southampton on 31 October 2016, aged 90. He was cremated at Southampton Crematorium just over a fortnight after his death.

== Sources ==
- Chesterfield, Trevor; McGlew, Jackie (2003). South Africa's Cricket Captains. Johannesburg: Zebra Press. ISBN 9781868723768.
- Lewis, Tony (2010). Taking Fresh Guard. London: Headline. ISBN 9780755361588.
- Sandiford, Keith A. P. (2005). Roy Edwin Marshall: His Record Innings-by-Innings. Nottingham: ACS. ISBN 1905138156.
