= Butch White =

English cricketer

Personal information
- Full name: David William White
- Born: 14 December 1935; Sutton Coldfield, Warwickshire, England
- Died: 1 August 2008 (aged 72); Pulborough, Sussex, England
- Batting: Left-handed
- Bowling: Right-arm fast

International information
- National side: England
- Test debut (cap 406): 21 October 1961 v Pakistan
- Last Test: 2 February 1962 v Pakistan

Domestic team information
- Years: Team
- 1957–1971: Hampshire
- 1972: Glamorgan

Career statistics
Competition	Test	FC	LA
Matches	2	337	60
Runs scored	0	3,080	302
Batting average	0.00	10.58	10.06
100s/50s	0/0	0/5	0/0
Top score	0	58*	28
Balls bowled	220	58,184	3,084
Wickets	4	1,143	98
Bowling average	29.75	23.54	18.97
5 wickets in innings	0	57	1
10 wickets in match	0	5	0
Best bowling	3/65	9/44	5/31
Catches/stumpings	0/–	106/–	10/–
- Source: Cricinfo, 1 January 2025

David William "Butch" White (14 December 1935 – 1 August 2008) was an English cricketer who played in two Test matches for England against Pakistan in 1961 and 1962. A fast bowler, he played most of his first-class cricket at domestic level for Hampshire from 1957 to 1971, forming a formidable bowling partnership with Derek Shackleton. In his fifteen seasons with the county, he took nearly 1,100 wickets and was a member of the Hampshire side which won their first County Championship in 1961. At the end of his career, he spent a season playing for Glamorgan in 1972. White was considered to be one of the fastest bowlers in England.

== Cricket ==
=== Early career ===
David William White was born on 14 December 1935 in Sutton Coldfield, Warwickshire. In his youth, he played club cricket for Aston Unity in the Birmingham and District League, where his reputation as a right-handed fast bowler earned him an invitation to play for the Warwickshire Second XI. During National Service as a driving instructor in the British Army, White earned a trial with Hampshire. He made his first-class debut against Cambridge University at Bournemouth in 1957, and joined the county staff in 1958. During the 1958 season, he made his County Championship debut against Nottinghamshire, as a replacement for the injured Leo Harrison. He made seven first-class appearances across the season, taking 25 wickets at an average of 19.96, claiming his maiden five wicket haul on his Championship debut. The retirement of Vic Cannings in 1959 gave him the opportunity to open the bowling for Hampshire alongside Derek Shackleton, whom he would form a powerful bowling partnership with. In ten matches during 1959, he took 26 wickets at an average of 32.46.

In his first full season in 1960, White made 26 first-class appearances. He met with success, taking 124 wickets at an average of 19.10, with nine five wicket hauls; it was to be the best season of his entire first-class career. The 1960 season came in a period where there was "a jittery witch-hunt against chuckers", with White being called three times for chucking by umpire Paul Gibb against Sussex. Nobody quite knew why Gibb called him for chucking, and his bowling action would not be thereafter questioned. There was speculation that the incident may have dissuaded the England selectors from selecting White that summer. Commenting on White's first full season, Trevor Bailey remarked that he "was the most exciting discovery Hampshire have made in years" and rated him amongst the fastest bowlers in county cricket. He played a notable batting innings against Oxford University during the season, striking 28 runs from an over bowled by Dan Piachaud, a scoring sequence which contained four successive sixes.

His bowling partnership with Shackleton played a pivitol role in helping Hampshire to win their first County Championship in 1961. Complementing Shackleton's 153 wickets, White took 121 at an average of 25.07, with six five wicket hauls. One of his most notable contributions with the ball came against Sussex at Portsmouth, when he took a hat-trick to dismiss Jim Parks, Ian Thomson, and Donald Smith; he would have had a fourth successive wicket, had Jimmy Gray not dropped Graham Cooper, but he did succeed in dismissing Cooper with the sixth ball of the over. Although a tailender, he played an important innings in June 1961, when chasing 199 runs for victory against Gloucestershire, Hampshire were reduced to 162 for 8. White scored a quickfire 33 to take Hampshire to victory. His partnership with Shackleton afforded the Hampshire captain Colin Ingleby-Mackenzie the freedom to set bold declarations in the pursuit of victory, with the confidence that the pair could back up his bold captaincy, whilst being ably supported by the batting of Roy Marshall.

=== Test selection ===
Having impressed the England selectors in 1961, White was selected to tour India, Pakistan and Ceylon in the winter with the England team, which was organised by the Marylebone Cricket Club (MCC). He made his Test debut in the 1st Test against Pakistan at Lahore on 21 October 1961, opening the bowling. In his opening spell, he dismissed the Pakistani openers Hanif Mohammed and Imtiaz Ahmed, within 16 balls, ending the innings with figures of 3 for 65 and went wicketless in the Pakistani second innings. On what was a split tour, White did not feature in any of the Test matches against Indian, but did feature in several first-class matches the MCC played. He returned in February for the 3rd Test against Pakistan at Karachi, where he bowled Imtiaz Ahmed with his first ball of the match, but pulled a muscle and was unable to continue after only 16 deliveries. Although he had suffered a series of injuries during the tour, he still topped the tourists' bowling averages, with 32 wickets at 19.84, despite playing on "docile" pitches which offered little assistance to fast bowlers. White found his opportunities at Test level restricted by competition from Brian Statham and Fred Trueman.

=== Later Hampshire career ===
Hampshire were unable to repeat their success from 1961 in the 1962 season, finishing in tenth place. White spent periods of the season out with injury, making 24 appearances; he took 71 wickets at an average of 30.67, claiming two five wicket hauls. He took a second hat-trick during the season, against Sussex at Hove, when he dismissed Denis Foreman, Ken Suttle and Parks; soon after achieving this, he suffered a groin injury that prevented him from bowling until later in the match. He also made 24 appearances the following season, taking 95 wickets at an average of 23.41, claiming five or more wickets on five occasions. White was a member of Hampshire's team for their inaugural appearance in List A one-day cricket against Derbyshire in the 1963 Gillette Cup. For the first time since Hampshire's 1961 Championship triumph, White took a hundred wickets for the season in 1964, with 104 from 33 matches at an average of 30.27. The following season from 32 matches, he took 91 wickets at an average of 25.49; his 6 for 10 against Yorkshire on a "lively" Middlesbrough pitch was key to dismissing them for just 23 runs, Yorkshire's lowest-ever total. During the mid 1960s, White helped to run Hampshire's indoor school at Northlands Road.

White would take over a hundred wickets in a season for the final time in 1966, taking 109 from 27 matches at an average of 19.75. He claimed five wickets in an innings on five occasions, and against Leicestershire at Portsmouth, he took his career best figures of 9 for 44. His good form with the ball continued into 1967, with White taking 95 wickets at an average of 22.13 from 30 first-class matches, once again taking five wickets in an innings on five occasions across the season. In 1968, he made 28 first-class appearances, taking 87 wickets at an average of 17.44, whilst the following season he took 92 wickets at an average of 19.29 from 28 matches, claiming seven five wicket hauls. He claimed his 1000th first-class wicket in June, when he dismissed Nottinghamshire's Barry Stead. With the further proliferation of the one-day game in county cricket during the 1969 season, which came via the introduction of Sunday League, White found himself playing regular one-day cricket. He made seventeen one-day appearances in 1969, helping Hampshire to finish second in the inaugural Player's County League. In these, he took 27 wickets at an average of 18.70, and took his only career one-day five wicket haul against a Yorkshire side weakened by Test call-ups. He was afforded a benefit in 1969, which raised £4,547. Alongside fellow fast bowler Bob Cottam, White had threatened to leave Hampshire in 1969, unless his wages were bought up into line with Barry Richards; both Cottam and White reached an amicable agreement and remained with Hampshire heading into the 1970s.

White's twelve year partnership with Shackleton came to an end following the 1969 season, when Shackleton retired. During the 1970 season, White made fourteen first-class appearances, until a cartilage injury at the end of July, which required surgery, ruled him out of the remainder of the season. Prior to his injury, he had taken 45 wickets at an average of 23.86, and in June he had struck a 26-ball fifty against Sussex, having come into bat with Hampshire 64 for 7. He also made ten one-day appearances, taking 16 wickets at an average of 18.50. In 1971, White was beset by injuries. These limited his appearances to thirteen first-class and ten one-day matches, though his bowling was rendered largely ineffective in the matches that he did feature in. As a result of his injury affected season, Hampshire decided not to offer him a contract for the 1972 season, with White leaving alongside Alan Castell and Bob Cottam.

=== Move to Glamorgan ===
With Glamorgan having struggled to recruit bowlers, there was a pressing need to measure the workload of their three main bowlers Lawrence Williams, Malcolm Nash, and Tony Cordle. As a result, White was signed by Glamorgan in 1972 on a Sunday League deal. He played in eight one-day matches spread across the Benson & Hedges Cup, Gillette Cup, and John Player League, taking 8 wickets at an average of 21.62. He also made one appearance in the 1972 County Championship, against Gloucestershire, taking one wicket.

=== Playing style and statistics ===
White was a broad shouldered and muscular right-arm fast bowler, though was not exceptionally tall. He ran in energetically from 25 yards, with a delivery stride that the cricket writer John Arlott described as "convulsive". At the beginning of his career, he troubled batsmen with his ability to inswing the ball into right-handed batsman, and under the guidance of Shackleton he also developed an effective outswinger. The journalist David Foot described his bowling style as "reassuringly sound... rather than pleasing to the eye". He was known for unpredictable streaks of brilliance, though some considered these to appear when the pressure was off. Trueman shared the same view as Bailey, opining that he was the fastest bowler in England. As a left-handed tailend batsman, he used his muscular physique to his advantage to bludgeon the ball and was agricultural in his shot selection

In 315 first-class matches for Hampshire across fifteen seasons, he took 1,097 wickets at an average of 23.56; he took five wickets in an innings on 56 occasions and ten-wickets in a match on five. In terms of first-class wickets taken for Hampshire, White has the sixth-highest total. With the bat, he scored 2,967 runs for Hampshire, at an average of 10.86; he made five half centuries, with a top score of 58 not out. In the field, he took 103 catches for Hampshire.

== Later life and death ==
After retiring from the first-class game, he played club cricket in Hampshire for New Milton in the Hampshire League, whom he captained. He later settled in West Sussex, where he coached cricket at Christ's Hospital near Horsham. He played golf with a good handicap in later life, and was employed as a marshal at Mannings Heath Golf Club. He was a member of the West Sussex Golf Club in Pulborough. Whilst playing a round of golf there on 1 August 2008, he died after suffering a heart attack on the 11th hole. He was married twice, and had one son.
