= Donald Cartridge =

English cricketer

Personal information
- Full name: Donald Colin Cartridge
- Born: 31 December 1933; Sholing, Hampshire, England
- Died: 24 September 2015 (aged 81); Southampton, Hampshire, England
- Batting: Right-handed
- Bowling: Right-arm off break

Domestic team information
- Years: Team
- 1953: Hampshire

Career statistics
Competition	First-class
Matches	3
Runs scored	6
Batting average	1.00
100s/50s	–/–
Top score	4
Catches/stumpings	2/–
- Source: Cricinfo, 3 January 2010

Donald Colin Cartridge (31 December 1933 – 24 September 2015) was an English first-class cricketer and educator.

Cartridge was born in the Southampton suburb of Sholing in December 1933. He was educated at Itchen Grammar School and had the opportunity to go to university, but decided to pursue a career in county cricket instead. He joined Hampshire as one of Arthur Holt's 'colts', spending a spell in the Hampshire Second XI. He played first-class cricket for Hampshire in 1953, making one appearance against Oxford University at Oxford, and two in the County Championship against Yorkshire and Surrey. He struggled in his three first-class matches, scoring 6 runs from as many innings'. The arrival of opening batsman Roy Marshall essentially ended any prospect of Cartridge establishing himself in the Hampshire side.

Cartridge trained to become a teacher in Winchester at the King Alfred College, before becoming a physical education teacher at Millbrook School in Southampton. Following heart surgery, he became a maths teacher and spent over 35 years teaching at Millbrook. Following the end of his brief first-class career, Cartridge continued to play club cricket for several teams in Southampton, in addition to becoming a champion table tennis player and playing lawn bowls for Atherley Bowls Club, which led to him playing for Hampshire in the sport. Cartridge died at Southampton on 24 September 2015.
