= Arthur Holt (sportsman) =

English cricketer & footballer

Personal information
- Full name: Arthur George Holt
- Date of birth: 8 April 1911
- Place of birth: Southampton, Hampshire, England
- Date of death: 28 July 1994 (aged 83)
- Place of death: Southampton, Hampshire, England
- Height: 5 ft 9 in (1.75 m)
- Position: Inside forward

Youth career
- Totton

Senior career*
Years	Team	Apps	(Gls)
1932–1939	Southampton	206	(46)
- Cricket career
Cricket information
- Batting: Right-handed
- Bowling: Right-arm off break
Domestic team information
- Years: Team
- 1935–1948: Hampshire
Career statistics
Competition	First-class
Matches	79
Runs scored	2,853
Batting average	22.46
100s/50s	2/11
Top score	116
Balls bowled	34
Wickets	1
Bowling average	47.00
5 wickets in innings	–
10 wickets in match	–
Best bowling	1/24
Catches/stumpings	32/–
- Source: Arthur Holt at Cricinfo
- * Club domestic league appearances and goals

Arthur George Holt (8 April 1911 — 28 July 1994) was an English sportsman of the 1930s and 1940s. He played professional football for Southampton as an inside-forward, making 206 appearances and scoring 46 goals. As a cricketer, he played first-class cricket for Hampshire, making 79 appearances and scoring nearly 3,000 runs. After retirement from playing both sports, he became a coach with Hampshire from 1949 to 1965, coaching the county to its first County Championship title in 1961. He was also the proprietor of a successful sports shop in Southampton.

== Football career ==
Holt was born in Southampton in April 1911. He represented Southampton Schoolboys, before turning out for Bitterne Congregational in the Church League. Moving to Totton in the Hampshire League he came to the notice of Southampton, whom he joined in September 1931 as an amateur, before signing as a professional in October 1932. He made his first-team debut away to Manchester United on 7 January 1933 as centre-forward in place of Ted Drake, who was suffering from influenza. Despite scoring twice in five games, he lost his place to Drake and only made three more appearances in the 1932–33 season. In the following season, he established his place in the side, playing as an inside-forward alongside Drake, Dick Neal, Tommy Brewis and Fred Tully. It soon became obvious to manager George Kay that in Holt and Drake "Saints possessed two extremely promising young forwards".

He was "a punchy, enterprising player" and was "reputed to be one of the hardest kickers of a dead ball in the Football League". Over the next few seasons he remained a stalwart in the forward line as other players came and went as Saints struggled both on the pitch and financially. His best season was 1935–36 when, now supporting Vic Watson, he scored 13 goals (to Watson's 14). The 7–2 home win over Nottingham Forest on 15 February 1936 was the first time that two Southampton players had scored hat-tricks in the same match, with both Holt and Watson scoring hat-tricks, along with Dick Neal scoring a seventh in Southampton's first seven-goal haul in a Division Two match. A projected transfer to Bournemouth in the summer of 1939 fell through. Holt continued to appear for the Southampton in the early years of the Second World War, but joined the police and turned out for Cunliffe-Owen Aircraft in the local wartime league, and played as a wartime guest for Gosport Borough. Whilst playing for Cunliffe-Owen, he "discovered" Len Wilkins and recommended him to Southampton; Wilkins would become the mainstay of Southampton's defence until retiring in 1958. In his competitive Southampton career which lasted until 1939, he played a total of 214 games, scoring 47 goals.

== Cricket career ==
=== Playing career ===
A club cricketer in Southampton for Deanery Cricket Club, he represented Hampshire at youth level, prior to joining the staff at Hampshire in 1934. He made his debut in first-class cricket for Hampshire against Somerset at Taunton in the 1935 County Championship. He made seven appearances that season, scoring 174 runs. In the season that followed, he made just three first-class appearances. He managed to establish himself in the Hampshire side during the 1937 season, making sixteen appearances in the County Championship. scoring 586 runs. Notably that season against Surrey at The Oval, he made 78 in Hampshire's first innings in a third wicket partnership of 122 with Johnny Arnold, while in their second innings he made 64 in a stand of 125 for the second wicket with Arthur Pothecary. Hampshire would go onto win the match by 71 runs.

His first game in the following season was against Leicestershire at Leicester, with Holt scoring his maiden first-class century, making 116 and partnering Neil McCorkell in an opening stand of 101. He played eight times for Hampshire in 1938, and in the season before the war, he made eleven appearances, all in the County Championship. He scored his second first-class century in 1939, making 115 against Warwickshire and adding 137 for the fourth wicket Johnny Arnold. During the war, he played a number of exhibition matches for, including for a British Empire XI in 1944. Following the war, he returned to play first-class cricket for Hampshire between 1946 and 1948, making an additional 34 appearances. His best return came during the 1946 season, with Holt scoring 891 runs at an average of 24.75, though he did not manage to make any centuries in his post-war cricket. Overall, Holt made 79 first-class appearances for Hampshire. In these, he scored 2,853 runs at an average of 22.46. With the post-war emergence of younger batsman such as Gilbert Dawson, Jimmy Gray, Leo Harrison, and Neville Rogers, Holt retired at the end of the 1948 season.

=== Coaching career ===
In 1949, Hampshire coach Sam Staples was taken ill and his health rapidly declined, resulting in his death in June 1950. Holt was subsequently appointed coach by Hampshire captain and joint-secretary Desmond Eagar during the 1949 season. During his sixteen years coaching Hampshire, he helped to guide the county to its first County Championship win in 1961. He was regarded as a fine coach of young cricketers, with Hampshire's youth team being known as "Holt's Colts" during his tenure as coach. Amongst the future Hampshire cricketers he helped coach were Bob Cottam, Gordon Greenidge, Trevor Jesty, Peter Sainsbury, and Butch White amongst others. Many of the youngsters he coached formed the team that won Hampshire's second County Championship title in 1973. In 1953, he helped John Arlott persuade Henry Horton to take up county cricket as his football career at Southampton was coming to an end. He was succeeded as coach by Leo Harrison.

Arlott described Holt during his coaching tenure in his memoirs:

"Go to the County Ground on any day in the cricket season – or, for that matter, on a good many days outside it – and somewhere between the indoor school and the pavilion you are likely to meet a comfortable, well-fed-looking man going in one direction when he obviously wants to go in several. He has a rosy face, a quizzical look in his blue eyes and one eyebrow goes up as he asks you wistfully, out of the side of his mouth, "ave you seen so-and-so?" This is 'The Coach'. Arthur Holt finds that title convenient: it saves him the embarrassment of telling ground staff boys that they must call him Mister Holt and not Arthur."

== Later life and legacy ==
In 1946, Holt established Holt & Haskell Limited, a sports retailers in Shirley, Southampton. The business operated until 2022, specialising in the sale of cricket clothing and equipment, and was one of the United Kingdom's leading cricket specialists. He was known to provide friends with large discounts on the goods he sold. Holt died at Southampton in July 1994, following a short illness.

In 2004, the Second XI pavilion on the Nursery Ground at Hampshire's new Rose Bowl ground was named The Arthur Holt Pavilion in his memory.

Sporting positions
Preceded by Sam Staples	Hampshire cricket coach 1949–1965	Succeeded by Leo Harrison
