= Michael Hewett =

English cricketer

Personal information
- Full name: Michael John Hewett
- Born: 26 August 1950 (age 76); Hampstead, Middlesex, England
- Batting: Right-handed
- Bowling: Right-arm medium

Domestic team information
- Years: Team
- 1972–1973: Gloucestershire
- 1981–1982: Berkshire

Career statistics
| Competition | List A |
|---|---|
| Matches | 5 |
| Runs scored | 4 |
| Batting average | – |
| 100s/50s | –/– |
| Top score | 2* |
| Balls bowled | 152 |
| Wickets | 2 |
| Bowling average | 53.50 |
| 5 wickets in innings | – |
| 10 wickets in match | – |
| Best bowling | 2/14 |
| Catches/stumpings | –/– |
- Source: Cricinfo, 13 February 2019

Michael John Hewett (born 26 August 1950) is a former English cricketer.

Hewett made his debut for Gloucestershire in List A one-day cricket against Warwickshire Cheltenham in the 1972 John Player League. He made three further List A appearances in that seasons competition, before making a final List A appearance against Glamorgan in the 1973 John Player League. He bowled 25.2 overs of medium pace across his five matches, taking 2 wickets at an average of 53.50. Both wickets came against Yorkshire, with Hewett dismissing Test batsman in the form of Geoff Boycott and John Hampshire. He did not feature in first-class cricket for Gloucestershire. Nearly a decade later he played minor counties cricket for Berkshire, debuting in the 1981 Minor Counties Championship. He played one further match in 1981, before playing a further two in 1982.
