= Cartridge =

Cartridge may refer to:

== Objects ==
- Cartridge (firearms), a type of modern ammunition
- ROM cartridge, a removable component in an electronic device
- Chemical cartridge, a type of filter used in respirators
- Ink cartridge, a component for inkjet printers that contains the ink
- The liquid storage component of a vaporizer
- Magnetic cartridge, an electromechanical transducer, commonly called a 'pickup', used to play records on a turntable

== Other uses ==
- Donald Cartridge (1933–2015), English cricketer and educator
- Cartridge Creek, a creek near Fresno, California, United States
