= International Wanderers in Rhodesia and Transvaal in 1974–75 =

An International Wanderers team, made up of international players from multiple countries, toured Rhodesia in 1974. They played five matches against the Rhodesia cricket team and one game in South Africa against Transvaal.

== Squad ==
The following players played one or more matches for the International Wanderers

Player	Date of birth	Batting style	Bowling style	Country
Eddie Barlow	12 August 1940	Right hand	Right arm medium	South Africa
Tony Brown	24 June 1936	Right hand	Right arm fast-medium	England
Peter Carlstein	28 October 1938	Right hand	Right arm legbreak	Rhodesia
Ian Chappell	26 September 1943	Right hand	Right arm legbreak	Australia
Brian Close	24 February 1931	Left hand	Right arm offbreak	England
Tony Greig	6 October 1946	Right hand	Right arm medium	England
Pasty Harris	25 May 1944	Right hand	Right arm legbreak	England
Graham McKenzie	24 June 1941	Right hand	Right arm fast	Australia
Graeme Pollock	27 February 1944	Left hand	Right arm legbreak	South Africa
Barry Richards	21 July 1945	Right hand	Right arm offbreak	South Africa
Graham Roope	12 July 1946	Right hand	Right arm medium	England
Peter Sainsbury	13 June 1934	Right hand	Slow left-arm orthodox	England
John Shepherd	9 November 1943	Right hand	Right arm medium	Barbados
Jack Simmons	28 March 1941	Right hand	Right arm offbreak	England
Roger Tolchard	15 June 1946	Right hand	Right arm offbreak	England
Glenn Turner	26 May 1947	Right hand	Right arm offbreak	New Zealand
Younis Ahmed	20 October 1947	Left hand	Left arm medium	Pakistan

== Tour matches ==
12 September 1974
(50-over match)
Scorecard

International Wanderers; 194/6 (50 overs)	v	Rhodesia; 127 (43.3 overs)
Graham Roope 54*; John Traicos 3/29 (10 overs)		James Mitchell 42; Tony Greig 4/33 (6.3 overs)

International Wanderers won by 67 runs
Queens Sports Club, Bulawayo

- Toss not known

13 September 1974
(50-over match)

International Wanderers; 272/4	v	Rhodesia; 215
Glenn Turner 76		Robin Jackman 71*

International Wanderers won by 57 runs
Queens Sports Club, Bulawayo

- Toss not known

14–16 September 1974
(3-day match)
Scorecard

Rhodesia	v	International Wanderers
224 (87.2 overs); Mike Procter 68; Graham McKenzie 4/35 (16 overs)		235 (81.5 overs); Brian Close 102; Robin Jackman 3/52 (20 overs)
219 (74.4 overs); Paddy Clift 73; John Shepherd 4/37 (16.4 overs)		214/3 (41.4 overs); John Shepherd 71*; Mike Procter 2/33 (11 overs)

International Wanderers won by 7 wickets
Police B Ground, Salisbury
Umpires: Kantilal Kanjee and David O. Levy

- International Wanderers won the toss and decided to field

17 September 1974
(50-over match)
Scorecard

International Wanderers; 266 (50 overs)	v	Rhodesia; 195/8 (50 overs)
Glenn Turner 114; Brian Wishart 3/41 (10 overs)		Robin Jackman 37; Peter Sainsbury 3/18 (10 overs)

International Wanderers won by 71 runs
Gwelo Sports Club, Gwelo

- Toss not known

21 September 1974
(50-over match)
Scorecard

International Wanderers; 272/4 (50 overs)	v	Rhodesia; 215/8 (50 overs)
Glenn Turner 76; Robin Jackman 1/26 (10 overs)		Robin Jackman 71*; Graham Roope 2/14 (4 overs)

International Wanderers won by 57 runs
Umtali Sports Club, Umtali

- Toss not known

22 September 1974
(50-over match)
Scorecard

International Wanderers; 267/6 (50 overs)	v	Rhodesia; 174 (43.3 overs)
Graeme Pollock 102; Mike Procter 2/35 (10 overs)		Peter Carlstein 42*; Tony Greig 3/26 (7.3 overs)

International Wanderers won by 93 runs
Police B Ground, Salisbury
Player of the match: Graeme Pollock

- Toss not known

27–30 September 1974
(3-day match)
Scorecard

International Wanderers	v	Transvaal
407/6d (89 overs); Younis Ahmed 154; Patrick Flanagan 3/79 (21 overs)		243 (102.4 overs); Jimmy Cook 72; Graham McKenzie 4/59 (24 overs)
264/9 (60 overs); Barry Richards 68; Peter de Vaal 3/30 (9 overs)		245 (74.4 overs); Peter de Vaal 55; Brian Close 4/36 (3.4 overs)

International Wanderers won by 183 runs
New Wanderers Stadium, Johannesburg
Umpires: Arthur Norton and Ted Wood

- International Wanderers won the toss and decided to bat
- 29 September was taken as a rest day
