= 1976 English cricket season =

The 1976 English cricket season was the 77th in which the County Championship had been an official competition. Clive Lloyd adopted a new approach to Test cricket as a battery of pace bowlers was used to intimidate the England batsmen. Lloyd adopted the tactic after his own team's experiences against Jeff Thomson and Dennis Lillee the previous year. England's batsmen were no match for Andy Roberts and Michael Holding, but even more worrying was a dearth of effective England bowlers and it was West Indian batsmen like Viv Richards and Gordon Greenidge who were the real stars of a long, hot, dry summer. Middlesex won the County Championship.

== Honours ==
- County Championship – Middlesex
- Gillette Cup – Northamptonshire
- Sunday League – Kent
- Benson & Hedges Cup – Kent
- Minor Counties Championship – Durham
- Second XI Championship – Kent II
- Wisden – Mike Brearley, Gordon Greenidge, Michael Holding, Vivian Richards, Bob Taylor

== International series ==
=== West Indies men ===
After two drawn games in the first two tests, the West Indians won the remaining three Test matches to convincingly win the series 3–0.

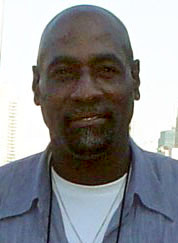
Viv Richards was outstanding for the West Indies, scoring 829 runs in the four Test matches against England.

The West Indies cricket team made their tenth visit to England, under the captaincy of Clive Lloyd. The first Test match was played at Trent Bridge in Nottingham. Viv Richards scored 232 runs for the West Indies in the first innings, and shared a partnership of 303 with Alvin Kallicharran. The West Indies ultimately batted for most of the first two days, and closed their innings on 494. In response, England made 332, avoiding the follow-on; David Steele scored a century. Batting again, the West Indies scored 176 runs, and set England a total of 339 runs to win. England, with only five and a quarter hours left in the match, did not attempt the chase, nor were the West Indies able to take early wickets to give them a chance of winning. The match finished as a draw; writing in the Wisden Cricketers' Almanack, Norman Preston said that "it was a disappointing performance" from England.

=== Australia women ===
The Australian women's cricket team toured England between May and August 1976. The test series against England women's cricket team was played for the Women's Ashes, which England were defending. The series was drawn 0–0, meaning that England retained the Ashes. England won the three-match ODI series 2–1. The second ODI, won by England, was the first women's cricket match ever played at Lord's.

== Leading batsmen ==
1976 English cricket season – leading batsmen by average
Name	Innings	Runs	Highest	Average	100s
Zaheer Abbas	39	2554	230*	75.11	11
Viv Richards	25	1724	291	71.83	6
Geoffrey Boycott	24	1288	207*	67.78	5
Dennis Amiss	38	2110	203	65.93	8
Clive Lloyd	26	1363	201*	61.95	3

1976 English cricket season – leading batsmen by aggregate
Name	Innings	Runs	Highest	Average	100s
Zaheer Abbas	39	2554	230*	75.11	11
Dennis Amiss	38	2110	203	65.93	8
Gordon Greenidge	38	1952	134	55.77	8
Ken McEwan	38	1821	156	49.21	6
Brian Davison	41	1818	132	56.81	6

== Leading bowlers ==
1976 English cricket season – leading bowlers by average
Name	Balls	Maidens	Runs	Wickets	Average
Michael Holding	2037	111	791	55	14.38
Norman Featherstone	2511	141	901	57	15.80
Asif Iqbal	418	12	214	13	16.46
Peter Sainsbury	3435	228	1236	66	18.72
Vanburn Holder	2342	109	1004	52	19.30

1976 English cricket season – leading bowlers by aggregate
Name	Balls	Maidens	Runs	Wickets	Average
Geoff Cope	5500	288	2245	93	24.13
Mike Selvey	3867	130	1913	90	21.25
Phil Edmonds	5321	286	2029	88	23.05
Robin Jackman	3382	120	1760	85	20.70
Sarfraz Nawaz	3836	143	1867	82	22.76

== Annual reviews ==
- Playfair Cricket Annual 1977
- Wisden Cricketers' Almanack 1977

== External sources ==
- CricketArchive – season and tournament itineraries
