= 1971 English cricket season =

The 1971 English cricket season was the 72nd in which the County Championship had been an official competition. India won a Test series in England for the first time. It was a huge surprise at the time because England, having just won the Ashes in Australia, had a very strong team. England also played Pakistan and won that series 1–0. Surrey won the County Championship.

== Honours ==
- County Championship - Surrey
- Gillette Cup - Lancashire
- Sunday League - Worcestershire
- Minor Counties Championship - Yorkshire II
- Second XI Championship - Hampshire II
- Wisden - Geoff Arnold, Bhagwat Chandrasekhar, Lance Gibbs, Brian Taylor, Zaheer Abbas

== Test series ==
1971 saw India tour England for the second half of the domestic season. After drawing the first two tests at Lord's and Old Trafford, India won the final test at The Oval by four wickets to claim the series 1–0. This was India's first victory on England's soil.

For the first half of the season, England hosted Pakistan. The first two games were drawn, but this time England won the final test at Headingley by 25 runs to take the series 1–0.

== Leading batsmen ==
1971 English cricket season – leading batsmen by average
| Name | Innings | Runs | Highest | Average | 100s |
|---|---|---|---|---|---|
| Geoffrey Boycott | 30 | 2503 | 233 | 100.12 | 13 |
| Zaheer Abbas | 31 | 1508 | 274 | 55.85 | 4 |
| Keith Fletcher | 41 | 1490 | 164* | 51.37 | 3 |
| Pasty Harris | 45 | 2238 | 177 | 50.86 | 9 |
| Mike Smith | 48 | 1951 | 127 | 50.02 | 6 |

1971 English cricket season – leading batsmen by aggregate
| Name | Innings | Runs | Highest | Average | 100s |
|---|---|---|---|---|---|
| Geoffrey Boycott | 30 | 2503 | 233 | 100.12 | 13 |
| Pasty Harris | 45 | 2238 | 177 | 50.86 | 9 |
| John Edrich | 44 | 2031 | 195* | 47.23 | 6 |
| Mike Smith | 48 | 1951 | 127 | 50.02 | 6 |
| Barry Richards | 45 | 1938 | 141* | 47.26 | 2 |

== Leading bowlers ==
1971 English cricket season – leading bowlers by average
| Name | Balls | Maidens | Runs | Wickets | Average |
|---|---|---|---|---|---|
| Geoff Arnold | 3792 | 171 | 1421 | 83 | 17.12 |
| Peter Sainsbury | 5105 | 332 | 1874 | 107 | 17.51 |
| Tom Cartwright | 5860 | 407 | 1852 | 104 | 17.80 |
| Don Wilson | 3164 | 210 | 1095 | 60 | 18.25 |
| Norman Featherstone | 759 | 33 | 329 | 18 | 18.27 |

1971 English cricket season – leading bowlers by aggregate
| Name | Balls | Maidens | Runs | Wickets | Average |
|---|---|---|---|---|---|
| Lance Gibbs | 6145 | 296 | 2475 | 131 | 18.89 |
| Peter Sainsbury | 5105 | 332 | 1874 | 107 | 17.51 |
| Tom Cartwright | 5860 | 407 | 1852 | 104 | 17.80 |
| Fred Titmus | 6391 | 341 | 2355 | 104 | 22.64 |
| Intikhab Alam | 6106 | 244 | 2950 | 104 | 28.36 |

== Annual reviews ==
- Playfair Cricket Annual 1972
- Wisden Cricketers' Almanack 1972
