= Trevor Jesty =

English cricketer

Personal information
- Full name: Trevor Edward Jesty
- Born: 2 June 1948 (age 78); Gosport, Hampshire, England
- Nickname: Jets
- Height: 5 ft 9 in (1.75 m)
- Batting: Right-handed
- Bowling: Right-arm medium

International information
- National side: England
- ODI debut (cap 68): 11 January 1983 v Australia
- Last ODI: 19 February 1983 v New Zealand

Domestic team information
- Years: Team
- 1966–1984: Hampshire
- 1973/74: Border
- 1974/75–1980/81: Griqualand West
- 1979/80: Canterbury
- 1985–1987: Surrey
- 1987/88–1991: Lancashire

Umpiring information
- WTests umpired: 2 (2006–2009)
- WODIs umpired: 3 (2003–2011)
- WT20Is umpired: 6 (2007–2012)
- FC umpired: 268 (1993–2013)

Career statistics
Competition	ODI	FC	LA
Matches	10	490	428
Runs scored	127	21,916	9,216
Batting average	21.16	32.71	27.10
100s/50s	0/1	35/110	7/46
Top score	52*	248	166*
Balls bowled	108	36,864	13,309
Wickets	1	585	372
Bowling average	93.00	27.47	24.95
5 wickets in innings	0	19	5
10 wickets in match	0	0	0
Best bowling	1/23	7/75	6/20
Catches/stumpings	5/–	265/1	106/–
- Source: Cricinfo, 5 December 2013

Trevor Edward Jesty (born 2 June 1948) is an English former cricketer and cricket umpire. As a player he was an all rounder (a right-handed batsman and medium-pace bowler) who played 490 first-class matches, scoring 21,916 runs and taking 585 wickets, between 1966 and 1991.

== Cricket ==
=== Early life and cricket career ===
Trevor Edward Jesty was born on 2 June 1948 in Gosport, Hampshire. He was educated there at Privett County Secondary Modern. Aged 16, Jesty played at youth level Hampshire's colt's side, under the guidance of coach Arthur Holt. An all-rounder, Jesty made his debut for Hampshire in a first-class match against Essex at Portsmouth in the 1966 County Championship. He would not play for Hampshire's first team again until the 1968 season; after playing two first-class matches against Oxford and Cambridge Universities, Jesty made three appearances in the County Championship.

Jesty established himself in the team in 1969, making 25 first-class appearances, with 23 in the County Championship. He scored 596 runs at a batting average of 22.92 from his 25 matches, including four half-centuries; amongst these was a counter-attacking unbeaten 55 made in a two runs defeat to Somerset in the Championship in May, when he hit nine fours and nearly took Hampshire to an unlikely victory, having been 107 for 7 in pursuit of 170 runs. With his right-arm medium pace bowling, he took 33 wickets at a bowling average of 27.96. In a season in which the one-day format was expanded with the introduction of the Player's County League, Jesty made his List A one-day debut against Kent. He went on to make 15 appearances in the league, taking 18 wickets at 23.83. He made 22 first-class appearances in the 1970 season, scoring 572 runs at 24.86, including three half centuries. He took 32 first-class wickets in the season, though his average increased markedly to 43.84; similarly, in one-day cricket his bowling average also increased, to 34.58, taking 17 wickets from 18 matches. In 1970, he scored his maiden one-day fifty, an unbeaten 60 runs in a defeat to Derbyshire in the John Player League.

Jesty scored 702 runs at 22.64 from 23 first-class matches in 1971, and took 42 wickets at 29.19. He scored 252 runs in from 16 one-day appearances, and took 24 wickets at 22.12.

=== County Championship winner ===
Jesty helped Hampshire to win the 1973 County Championship, taking 35 wickets at an average of 20 (although less successful with the bat that year), and the John Player League in 1975 and 1978.

=== Later years at Hampshire ===
Jesty played 10 one-day internationals for England, most of them during the Benson & Hedges World Series Cup tournament in 1983. His highlight was scoring 52 not out from 35 balls against New Zealand at Adelaide. He was named in the England squad for the 1983 World Cup. He was named as one of the five Wisden Cricketers of the Year in 1983 for his performances during the 1982 English cricket season, during which he scored 1,645 runs at 58.75, including eight hundreds, and took 31 wickets. In 1983 he made 166 not out, his highest score in limited-over cricket, in a John Player League match against Surrey, sharing in an unbroken second-wicket stand of 269 with Gordon Greenidge.

=== Move to Surrey ===
After playing 340 games for Hampshire, Jesty moved to Surrey for the 1985 season. Jesty played for Surrey for the next three seasons. While at Surrey he made 112 in a NatWest Trophy semi final against Lancashire in 1986, finishing narrowly on the losing team.

=== Career end with Lancashire ===
Jesty moved to Lancashire for the 1988 season. Into his forties he helped Lancashire to win the Refuge Assurance Cup in 1988, top-scoring in the final against Worcestershire, and the Refuge Assurance League in 1989. He was still at the county during its success in 1990, although appearing more in Refuge Assurance League fixtures.

== Playing style and statistics ==
In total Jesty scored 1,000 runs in a first-class season 10 times.

== Umpiring career ==
Following his retirement as a player, Jesty became a cricket umpire in England, and served as the reserve umpire for the Fourth Test Match at The Oval between England and Pakistan in 2006. In 2007 he umpired in the unauthorised Indian Cricket League. He continued as a first-class umpire until his retirement in 2013.
