= Gilbert Dawson =

English cricketer (1914–1969)

Personal information
- Full name: Gilbert Wilkinson Dawson
- Born: 9 December 1914; Bradford, Yorkshire, England
- Died: 24 May 1969 (aged 54); Paisley, Lanarkshire, Scotland
- Batting: Right-handed
- Bowling: Unknown

Domestic team information
- Years: Team
- 1947–1949: Hampshire

Career statistics
Competition	First-class
Matches	60
Runs scored	2,643
Batting average	26.43
100s/50s	4/10
Top score	158*
Balls bowled	18
Wickets	0
Bowling average	–
5 wickets in innings	–
10 wickets in match	–
Best bowling	–
Catches/stumpings	36/–
- Source: Cricinfo, 15 January 2010

Gilbert Wilkinson Dawson (9 December 1914 – 24 May 1969) was a first-class English cricketer.

Dawson was born at Bradford in December 1914. He initially played club cricket in the Bradford League for East Bierley, Windhill and Pudsey St. Lawrence. Following the end of the Second World War, new Hampshire captain Desmond Eagar set about recruiting younger players to replace the ageing players that had appeared for Hampshire before the war. He looked north, recruiting Dawson, alongside Derek Shackleton and the unrelated Harold Dawson. Moving south, he made his debut in first-class cricket for Hampshire against Middlesex at Lord's in the 1947 County Championship. The first of his four centuries for Hampshire came in 1947, against Yorkshire at Bournemouth. He played twelve matches in his debut season, and followed that up in 1948 with thirty appearances; he recorded a second century in 1948, making 110 against Derbyshire, whilst scoring 1,229 runs in the season at an average of 23.63. In 1949, he made eighteen first-class appearances. In this season, he scored 1,032 runs at an average of 33.29; he recorded his highest first-class score in 1949, making 158 not out against Nottinghamshire at Trent Bridge. Dawson made sixty first-class appearances for Hampshire, scoring 2,643 runs at an average of 26.43; he made four centuries and ten fifties.

During the 1949 season, he was dismissed by the Duke of Edinburgh when his personal eleven played Hampshire in a friendly match at Bournemouth. After leaving Hampshire at the end of the 1949 season, Dawson moved to Scotland, where he became well-known in Scottish cricket circles. He played his club cricket there for Ferguslie, signing for the club in October 1949, and topping their batting averages in 1952. He later played for Poloc, and would go on to umpire in club matches. During a club match on 24 May 1969, Dawson was taken unwell. He proceeded to leave the venue and was later found dead in Paisley in his crashed car.
