= Desmond Eagar =

English cricketer, writer and historian (1917–1977)

Personal information
- Full name: Edward Desmond Russell Eagar
- Born: 8 December 1917; Cheltenham, Gloucestershire, England
- Died: 13 September 1977 (aged 59); Kingsbridge, Devon, England
- Batting: Right-handed
- Bowling: Slow left-arm orthodox

Domestic team information
- Years: Team
- 1935–1939: Gloucestershire
- 1938–1939: Oxford University
- 1946–1957: Hampshire
- 1952–1958: Marylebone Cricket Club

Career statistics
Competition	First-class
Matches	363
Runs scored	12,178
Batting average	21.86
100s/50s	10/52
Top score	158*
Balls bowled	1,972
Wickets	31
Bowling average	47.77
5 wickets in innings	1
10 wickets in match	–
Best bowling	6/66
Catches/stumpings	369/–
- Source: Cricinfo, 13 August 2009

Edward Desmond Russell Eagar (8 December 1917 – 13 September 1977) was an English amateur first-class cricketer who played county cricket for Gloucestershire and Hampshire. Eagar debuted for Gloucestershire whilst still a schoolboy at Cheltenham College, before his matriculation to the University of Oxford, where he played first-class cricket for Oxford University Cricket Club. Following service in the Second World War with the South Wales Borderers, Eagar was appointed as captain and secretary of Hampshire in 1946. Eagar was instrumental, through organisation, captaincy and recruitment, in raising the county team from perennial also-rans to the point where, in the seasons after he retired from playing, it was runner-up and then, in 1961, the champions in the County Championship for the first time in its history. His career spanned from 1935 to 1958, encompassing 363 first-class matches. His 31 years as secretary of Hampshire made him the longest serving secretary in first-class cricket.

Following the end of his playing career, Eagar commentated on cricket matches for BBC Radio and Southern Television. He was an authority on cricket history and wrote extensively on the subject, contributing to several books. He spent fifteen years as the field hockey correspondent for The Sunday Telegraph, having played field hockey while at university.

== Early life and pre-war career ==
The son of Edward Frank Eagar, he was born at Cheltenham in December 1917. He was educated there at Cheltenham College, where his cricket coach was Alec Kennedy. There he played for the cricket eleven, captaining the college and meeting with considerable success with his slow left-arm bowling. Whilst still a student at Cheltenham, Eagar made his debut in first-class cricket for Gloucestershire against Middlesex at the college cricket ground in the 1935 County Championship, with him making a further appearance that season, followed by two more in the 1936 County Championship and one in the 1937 County Championship (alongside a match against Oxford University). From Cheltenham, he matriculated to Brasenose College, Oxford.

As an undergraduate at Oxford, Eagar joined the Oxford University Cricket Club, and played first-class cricket for the club in 1938 and 1939, making 23 appearances. He scored over 600 runs for Oxford in 1938, which included his maiden century, and was considered unlucky not to have played against Cambridge University in The University Match at Lord's, and thus earn a blue; however, he led the Oxford averages the following season and played in The University Match, gaining his blue. Wisden described Eagar as "the most dangerous, if not the soundest, bat in the [Oxford] side" in 1939. For Oxford, he scored 1,395 runs in first-class cricket at an average of 37.70, making two centuries and ten half centuries. As a part-time slow left-arm orthodox bowler, he took 16 wickets at a bowling average of exactly 33; it was for Oxford that he took his only five-wicket haul in first-class cricket, with figures of 6 for 66 against Sussex at Eastbourne in 1939. In addition to representing Oxford in cricket, Eagar also played field hockey for the university, for which he gained a blue. During the summer break in 1938 and 1939, Eagar continued to play for Gloucestershire in the County Championship, making an additional fifteen appearances. He scored 465 runs for Gloucestershire at an average of 16.60, with a highest score of 82.

Eagar served in the Second World War, having been commissioned as a second lieutenant onto the general list whilst still a student at Oxford in August 1938. He joined the South Wales Borderers in October 1939, and was an instructor at Cowley Barracks for part of the war, alongside future British Army Lieutenant-General James Wilson. After the end of the war in Europe, Eagar featured for the Over-33 cricket team (despite being aged 27 in 1945) against the Under-33 cricket team in a first-class match at Lord's in September 1945.

== Hampshire captaincy ==
Eagar interviewed at Hampshire for the post of captain and joint-secretary in October 1945. He had yet to be demobilised, so was interviewed wearing his military uniform. He was not initially successful, with the Hampshire committee preferring the credentials of former England Test cricketer Freddie Brown; however, he preferred an offer from Northamptonshire, and so Eagar was appointed. By combining the roles he could maintain his status as an amateur on the field. He captained Hampshire throughout his twelve seasons with the county; he did so with meagre resources in what were financially lean times in Hampshire's history. Despite this, his early objectives at Hampshire were to recruit younger players to replace the ageing players that had appeared for Hampshire before the war; amongst his early recruits were Gilbert Dawson, Harold Dawson, and Derek Shackleton.

Two years into his secretaryship, he convinced pre-war professional Arthur Holt to coach Hampshire after his playing career had ended. As a captain, he was known to keep a mark book to monitor player's performances, remarking that batting averages (which Eagar likened to a "curse") were not a true reflection of a player's value, deducing that a player's true value lay in how they approached a given situation during a match. As his captaincy progressed, he took it upon himself to increase the Hampshire membership and to put the county on a more secure financial footing. Under his leadership, Hampshire progressed from one of the weakest county sides to one of the strongest, culminating with Hampshire finishing runners-up in the 1958 County Championship, the season following his retirement. His retirement was necessitated by two factors: a desire to concentrate on his role as secretary, and worsening lumbago.

From his debut match for Hampshire in the 1946 County Championship against Worcestershire at Southampton, to his final match against Gloucestershire in 1957, Eagar made 311 appearances. He was a modest batsman for Hampshire, passing 1,000 runs in a season on five occasions, with 1,200 runs in 1949 being his most successful. In his twelve seasons with Hampshire, he scored 10,091 runs at an average of 21.02; he made eight centuries and 40 half centuries, making a highest score of 158 not out against Oxford University in 1954. He was described by The Cricketer as a fearless fielder at short leg, and took a total of 369 catches from 363 first-class matches. He also took 15 wickets for Hampshire, albeit at an expensive average of 62.46. Described as an attacking batsman, his 363 matches yielded a total of 12,178 first-class runs at an average of 21.86.

Running concurrently with his Hampshire career, Eagar also made first-class appearances for the South in the 1946 North v South fixture, for the Over-33s against the Under-33s in 1949, for the Marylebone Cricket Club (MCC) in 1952 and 1958 (playing his final first-class match for the MCC against Oxford University), and for the Duke of Norfolk's XI; the latter consisted of three appearances against Jamaica on a tour of that country in March 1957, with Eagar captaining and managing the team during the tour.

== Post-playing career and later life ==
Eagar retired from first-class cricket at the end of the 1958 season after playing for the MCC. He was succeeded as Hampshire captain by Colin Ingleby-Mackenzie, who Eagar had identified him as "the man to inspire a mixed bag of cricketers beyond their promise". With his full-time commitment to the secretaryship, Hampshire, still under the captaincy of Ingleby-Mackenzie, won the 1961 County Championship. He was credited by Wisden with sowing the seed which paved the way for Hampshire to win the County Championship for the first time. Just how in 1946 he had inherited an ageing side, in the years following Hampshire's Championship success, there was once again a need to replace an ageing squad. To this end, Eagar recruited internationals such as the West Indians Gordon Greenidge and Andy Roberts, whilst overseeing the development of home-grown players such as Richard Gilliat, Trevor Jesty, Richard Lewis, and David Turner. He oversaw Hampshire's second County Championship title in 1973, in addition to their first one-day title in the 1975 John Player League. Alongside his secretaryship at Hampshire, he was also the president of the Hambledon Cricket Club. Eagar was the assistant-manager to Freddie Brown on the MCC's 1958–59 tour of Australia, with his and Brown's leadership on the tour being criticised by Tom Graveney, as what was considered one of the strongest teams to depart for Australia heavily lost The Ashes.

In August 1958 he did some cricket commentary for BBC Radio in the South and West of England only, and in 1960 he commentated for Southern Television. He was a considerable authority on cricket history and wrote extensively on the subject, contributing to E. W. Swanton's World of Cricket and co-writing the history of Hampshire County Cricket Club. He was also the field hockey correspondent for The Sunday Telegraph, from the inception of its field hockey reporting in 1961 to 1976. Eagar died suddenly on 13 September 1977, while on holiday in Kingsbridge, Devon; he was 59. At the time of his death, he was the longest serving secretary of a first-class county, having been secretary for 31 years; following his death, he was replaced as secretary by Jimmy James. The cricket photographer Patrick Eagar is his son. His wife died in April 2013.

Sporting positions
Preceded by George Taylor	Hampshire cricket captain 1946–1957	Succeeded by Colin Ingleby-Mackenzie
