= Leo Harrison =

English cricketer (1922–2016)

Personal information
- Full name: Leo Harrison
- Born: 8 June 1922; Mudeford, Hampshire, England
- Died: 12 October 2016 (aged 94); Mudeford, Dorset, England
- Batting: Right-handed
- Bowling: Unknown
- Role: Wicket-keeper

Domestic team information
- Years: Team
- 1939–1966: Hampshire
- 1954–1956: Marylebone Cricket Club

Umpiring information
- FC umpired: 1 (1949)

Career statistics
Competition	First-class
Matches	396
Runs scored	8,854
Batting average	17.49
100s/50s	6/27
Top score	153
Balls bowled	256
Wickets	0
Bowling average	–
5 wickets in innings	–
10 wickets in match	–
Best bowling	–
Catches/stumpings	578/103
- Source: Cricinfo, 7 October 2009

Leo Harrison (8 June 1922 – 12 October 2016) was an English first-class cricketer who played for Hampshire from 1939 to 1966. Making his debut in the County Championship before the Second World War, Harrison played initially as a batsman and reserve wicket-keeper to Neil McCorkell, an arrangement which continued until McCorkell's retirement in 1951, and Hampshire's brief experiment with Ralph Prouton as first-choice wicket-keeper, after which Harrison assumed the role of first-choice wicket-keeper after 1953. He played 387 first-class appearances for Hampshire, out of a total of 396 career first-class matches, and was a member of Hampshire's 1961 County Championship winning team.

During his career, he scored nearly 9,000 runs and took over 680 dismissals in the field, including 103 stumpings as wicket-keeper. Despite failing eyesight, which had kept him out of frontline service during the Second World War, Harrison was known as a wicket-keeper who would often stand up the stumps to fast bowlers, most notably Derek Shackleton. After retiring from playing, Harrison succeeded Arthur Holt as Hampshire coach in 1965, an appointment he would hold until 1970 when he left to go into business.

== Early left and pre-war cricket ==
The son of a builder, Harrison was born in Mudeford (then in Hampshire) in June 1922. He was educated at Twynham School, and joined the Hampshire ground staff straight after completing his education in 1937. Aged 17, he made his first-class debut for Hampshire against Worcestershire at Bournemouth in the 1939 County Championship, with him playing in the following fixture against Yorkshire. Harrison served in the Royal Air Force during the Second World War, but failed the eyesight test to become a pilot, and instead spent the war making flying instruments for Bomber Command in Slough, as well as serving on airfields in Yorkshire and East Anglia.

== Post-war cricket ==
=== Understudy to Neil McCorkell ===
During the war his eyesight had continued to deteriorate, necessitating him to wear spectacles. Following the war, the new Hampshire captain and secretary Desmond Eagar inherited an ageing pre-war side, but was determined to build a younger team using local talent — amongst them Harrison. He played seven times for Hampshire in the 1946 County Championship, and while still serving in the RAF, he played for the Royal Air Force cricket team against Worcestershire, in addition to making four appearances for the Combined Services; for both teams, he would play alongside his Hampshire teammate Alan Shirreff. During the early part of his post-war career with Hampshire, Harrison would play solely as a batsman, with the wicket-keeping duties being occupied by Neil McCorkell. He established himself in the Hampshire eleven in 1947, making 22 appearances in which he scored 567 runs at an average of 20.25. He made the same number of appearances in 1948, but generally struggled with the bat, scoring 256 runs at an average of 8.82; he did however find increased wicket-keeping opportunities when deputising for McCorkell.

When McCorkell broke a finger in May 1949, Harrison deputised as wicket-keeper for two months. He stood as an umpire in a first-class match between the Combined Services and Hampshire in 1949. He featured just ten times in 1950, and once again struggled with the bat in scoring 152 runs at an average of 9.50. In the proceeding season, he was again called upon to deputise as wicket-keeper for McCorkell in May, who was injured. The 1951 season would prove to be successful for Harrison, with him passing a thousand runs in a season for the first time, with 1,189 at an average of 30.48 from thirty matches. The season was also significant for him recording his first two first-class centuries, making 122 against Worcestershire at Southampton, which he followed up with 108 against Middlesex at Portsmouth, which spared Hampshire from an innings defeat; Harrison had been awarded his county cap following his innings against Worcestershire.

=== Succeeding McCorkell ===
McCorkell retired from first-class cricket following the 1951 season, in order to take up a coaching post in South Africa. Despite his retirement, Harrison did not immediately become Hampshire's first-choice wicket-keeper, despite media speculation that he would. Instead, Hampshire entrusted Ralph Prouton with the wicket-keeping duties for the 1952 season. Playing as a batsman, Harrison once again passed a thousand runs for the season in 1952, making 1,191 runs at an average of 27.06 from 27 matches; he made what would be his career-high first-class score against Nottinghamshire at Bournemouth, making 153 in Hampshire's first innings. He alternated the wicket-keeping duties with Prouton in 1953, and became first-choice wicket-keeper from 1954. Cricket historian David Frith proffered that his transition to full-time wicket-keeping duties had deprived Hampshire of a superb outfielder. In his first full season with the gloves, Harrison made 29 appearances (including for the Marylebone Cricket Club (MCC) against Cambridge University) and scored 823 runs at an average of 17.51; He scored what would be his final first-class century in 1954, against Derbyshire at Burton upon Trent. Cyril Washbrook was of the opinion that Harrison should have been reserve wicket-keeper to Godfrey Evans for England's 1954–55 tour of Australia.

As his career progressed, his failing eyesight led to diminishing returns with the bat. In 1955, he made 31 appearances (which included playing in the season opening match for the MCC against Surrey) and scored 548 runs at an average of 12.45, while from the same number of matches in 1956, he scored 317 runs at an average of 10.22. In the 1955 Gentlemen v Players match, he appeared for the Players as a late replacement for Godfrey Evans; this was the closest he would come to gaining a Test cap, with Tom Graveney being preferred over Harrison for selection for the Third Test of the series against South Africa. He remained Hampshire's first-choice wicket-keeper throughout the 1950s, with his diminished returns with the bat being complimented by his good work behind the stumps. Against Derbyshire in the 1956 County Championship, he captained Hampshire for the first time in place of the rested Eagar. He was afforded a benefit match ahead of the 1957 season, which was chosen to be played against Northamptonshire at Bournemouth in August. His benefit helped to raise £3,000, which he and his father used to build Harrison a house in Mudeford. By 1959, Hampshire had signed young wicket-keeper Brian Timms as an apprentice to Harrison. Harrison's 82 victims from behind the stumps in 1959 were a Hampshire record. Harrison was a member of Hampshire's 1961 County Championship winning team, scoring 652 runs from 27 matches and 62 dismissals behind the stumps. He continued as Hampshire's wicket-keeper the following season, making 27 appearances and scoring 509 runs at an average of 18.85, which included two final half centuries.

=== Coaching and 1966 return ===
Harrison retired at the end of the 1962 season, and was succeeded as Hampshire's first-choice wicket-keeper by Timms. Hampshire had been coached by Arthur Holt since 1949, but he retired in 1965 and was succeeded by Harrison. Alongside his coaching duties, he continued to act as Hampshire's reserve wicket-keeper and played in the Second XI Championship until 1970. In 1966, an injury crisis at Hampshire necessitated his return to County Championship action at the age of 43, against Surrey at Basingstoke. This appearance made him the last player to have appeared in a County Championship match who had previously played in a pre-war championship game. This appearance took his number of first-class appearances for Hampshire to 387, in which he scored 8,708 runs at an average of 17.66, making six centuries and 27 half centuries. In all first-class appearances (396), he took 681 dismissals, 103 of them stumpings. He was known to stand up the stumps to the pace bowler Derek Shackleton, with Harrison taking many slick leg side catches off of his bowling.

Amongst the players Harrison would help develop whilst coach at Hampshire was the South African Barry Richards. He remained as Hampshire coach until 1970, when he left citing the "dreadful pay", and instead joined a local building firm as its director, where he would remain until his retirement in 1987. Harrison was succeeded as coach by Geoff Keith. Prior to his retirement, Harrison had a coaching stint in Argentina during the 1960–61 winter, where he coached the Argentine cricket team. In a match against Brazil, Harrison played for the Brazilians who had turned up a player short, and scored a century.

== Later life and death ==
Harrison formed a close friendship with John Arlott, who he had first met as a teenager when Arlott was a police officer in Southampton. The pair would often holiday together, and when Arlott retired to Alderney, Harrison would be a regular visitor; during Harrison's benefit year, Arlott penned two works which featured Harrison: the first, was a privately published monograph about him, while the second was a poignant-cum-humorous short story, Ain't Half a Bloomin' Game, which he contributed to Lilliput magazine, and which featured Harrison. He was the guest of honour at the unveiling of The Cricket Society's plaque commemorating Arlott's residency at the Old Sun in New Alresford in 2009.

Harrison died at Mudeford on 12 October 2016. His wife, Joan, whom he had married in 1944, predeceased him in 1995. He was survived by two daughters and a son. Following his death, his Hampshire teammate John Manners (1914–2020) became the only surviving player to have played first-class county cricket before the Second World War.

Sporting positions
Preceded by Arthur Holt	Hampshire cricket coach 1965–1971	Succeeded by Geoff Keith
