= Peter de Vaal =

South African cricketer (born 1945)

Personal information
- Full name: Peter Derek de Vaal
- Born: 3 December 1945 (age 80); Cathcart, Cape Province, South Africa
- Batting: Left-handed
- Bowling: Slow left-arm orthodox

Domestic team information
- Years: Team
- 1967–68 to 1978–79: Transvaal
- 1979–80 to 1981–82: Northern Transvaal
- 1991–92 to 1992–93: Eastern Transvaal

Career statistics
Competition	First-class	List A
Matches	109	30
Runs scored	4208	526
Batting average	29.84	29.22
100s/50s	1/23	1/2
Top score	100*	111
Balls bowled	16,465	1319
Wickets	240	23
Bowling average	30.47	33.73
5 wickets in innings	6	–
10 wickets in match	1	n/a
Best bowling	7/76	4/27
Catches/stumpings	65/–	12/0
- Source: Cricinfo, 12 January 2018

Peter de Vaal (born 3 December 1945) is a former South African cricketer who played first-class and List A cricket from 1965 to 1993. He was an all-rounder who batted in the middle order and bowled left-arm orthodox spin.

== Cricket career ==
Peter de Vaal was a regular player for Transvaal B in 1967–68 and 1968–69, and progressed to the senior Transvaal side in 1969–70. He remained there until 1978–79, then played two seasons with Northern Transvaal. He never played for South Africa, but was picked on the squad for the 1971–72 tour of Australia which was cancelled. His best bowling figures in first-class cricket were 7 for 76 for Transvaal against Rhodesia in the 1976–77 Currie Cup.

After ten seasons out of the first-class game, and at the age of 45, he returned in 1991–92 to captain the new Eastern Transvaal team in their first two seasons. Under his inspirational leadership they won the UCB Bowl in 1991–92, when de Vaal was the competition's most successful bowler, with 29 wickets at an average of 20.34. He was especially successful in the innings victory over Western Transvaal, when he made 100 not out and took 3 for 32 and 7 for 94.

He spent many years studying accounting at the University of the Witwatersrand. Between 1965 and 1975 he played seven first-class matches for South African Universities.
