= Harold Dawson =

English cricketer

Personal information
- Born: 10 August 1914; Todmorden, Yorkshire, England
- Died: 14 May 1994 (aged 79); Todmorden, Yorkshire, England
- Batting: Right-handed
- Bowling: Right-arm medium

Domestic team information
- Years: Team
- 1947–1948: Hampshire

Career statistics
Competition	FC
Matches	10
Runs scored	236
Batting average	13.11
100s/50s	–/–
Top score	37
Balls bowled	12
Wickets	–
Bowling average	–
5 wickets in innings	–
10 wickets in match	–
Best bowling	–
Catches/stumpings	6/–
- Source: Cricinfo, 24 December 2009

Harold Dawson (10 August 1914 – 14 May 1994) was an English first-class cricketer. Dawson was a right-handed batsman who bowled right-arm medium pace.

Dawson joined famous Lancashire League team Todmorden Cricket Club in 1931. A prolific batsman for the club, Dawson scored a fifty on every ground in the Lancashire League. Dawson played in four championship and four Worsley Cup-winning sides.

Dawson represented Hampshire in ten first-class matches between 1937 and 1938. Dawson made his County Championship debut against Kent in 1937. His final first-class appearance for the county came against a Combined Services team in 1938.

In 1949 Dawson represented Devon in a friendly match against Worcestershire. In 1957 Dawson was part of a combined Lancashire League side that took on Lancashire in a friendly match.

From 1985 to 1986 Dawson was the president of Todmorden Cricket Club and of the Lancashire League.

Dawson died in Todmorden, Yorkshire on 14 May 1994.
