= Rod Bransgrove =

British entrepreneur, cricket administrator (born 1950)

Roderick Granville Bransgrove OBE (born 1950) is an English entrepreneur and former cricket administrator who served as the chairman of Hampshire County Cricket Club from 2000 to 2024. The appointment was seen by many as saving Hampshire from insolvency. His daughter, Lucy, is married to the Hampshire cricketer, Chris Wood.

== Personal life ==
Bransgrove's father served in the Royal Air Force, meaning he was brought up in a number of places, including abroad in Singapore and at home in London and Kent.

== Business career ==
Bransgrove moved to Hampshire in 1985, when he was 35, to set up his pharmaceutical business, Imperial Pharmaceuticals Services. In 1995 it was merged into Shire Pharmaceuticals Group plc with Rod a non-executive Director of Shire 1995 to 1998.

== Music career ==
Bransgrove (as Bestie Rote) features in Southampton-based six-strong soft rock band, Strapped for Cash, which released a Christmas single for four charities including Children in Need, in 2013. In 2014 the band released a debut EP, Kick Me When I'm Down, and played at the Ageas Bowl and in July 2015 supported Eric Clapton at a charity gig in Wormsley.
