= 1953 County Championship =

English cricket tournament

- Cricket format: First-class cricket
- Tournament format: League system
- Champions: Surrey (9th title)
- Participants: 17
- Matches: 238
- Most runs: Don Kenyon, (Sussex); 2,063
- Most wickets: Bruce Dooland, (Nottinghamshire); 152

The 1953 County Championship was the 54th officially organised running of the County Championship. Surrey won the Championship title.

On 16 May 1953, the match between Surrey and Warwickshire finished within the first day, with Surrey winning by an innings and 49 runs.

== Table ==
- 12 points for a win
- 6 points for a tie
- 6 points to team still batting in the fourth innings of a match in which scores finish level
- 4 points for first innings lead in a lost or drawn match
- 2 points for tie on first innings in a lost or drawn match
- If no play possible on the first two days, the match played to one-day laws with 8 points for a win.

	Team	P	W	L	D	T	No Dec	1st Inns Lead	Pts
1	Surrey	28	13	4	10	0	1	7	184
2	Sussex	28	11	3	13	0	1	9	168
=3	Lancashire	28	10	4	10	0	4	9	156
=3	Leicestershire	28	10	7	11	0	0	9	156
5	Middlesex	28	10	5	11	1	1	6	150
=6	Derbyshire	28	9	7	9	0	3	7	136
=6	Gloucestershire	28	9	7	10	0	2	7	136
8	Nottinghamshire	28	9	10	8	0	1	5	128
9	Warwickshire	28	6	7	14	0	1	13	124
10	Glamorgan	28	8	4	14	0	2	6	120
11	Northamptonshire	28	6	3	15	1	3	9	114
=12	Essex	28	6	7	13	0	2	7	100
=12	Yorkshire	28	6	6	13	0	3	7	100
14	Hampshire	28	6	11	11	0	0	6	96
15	Worcestershire	28	5	12	10	0	1	3	72
16	Kent	28	4	14	8	0	2	4	64
17	Somerset	28	2	19	6	0	1	3	36
