= 1972 John Player League =

- Administrator: Test and County Cricket Board
- Cricket format: Limited overs cricket (40 overs per innings)
- Tournament format: League
- Champions: Kent County Cricket Club (1st title)
- Participants: 17
- Matches: 136
- Most runs: 643 Barry Richards (Hampshire)
- Most wickets: 31 Keith Boyce (Essex)

The 1972 John Player League was the fourth competing of what was generally known as the Sunday League. The competition was won for the first time by Kent County Cricket Club.

== Standings ==
Team	Pld	W	T	L	N/R	A	Pts	R/R
Kent (C)	16	11	0	4	1	0	45	4.361
Leicestershire	16	11	0	5	0	0	44	4.215
Essex	16	10	0	5	1	0	41	4.059
Yorkshire	16	10	0	5	0	1	41	3.984
Middlesex	16	8	0	6	1	1	34	4.456
Hampshire	16	7	1	5	2	1	33	4.69
Somerset	16	8	0	7	0	1	33	4.584
Lancashire	16	8	0	7	1	0	33	4.181
Derbyshire	16	7	0	7	0	2	30	4.282
Surrey	16	7	0	7	0	2	30	4.192
Worcestershire	16	7	0	8	0	1	29	4.883
Warwickshire	16	7	0	8	1	0	29	4.322
Nottinghamshire	16	6	0	10	0	0	24	3.899
Northamptonshire	16	5	1	8	0	2	24	3.72
Sussex	16	5	0	8	0	3	23	3.862
Gloucestershire	16	3	2	10	1	0	17	3.985
Glamorgan	16	2	0	12	0	2	10	3.805
Team marked (C) finished as champions. Source: CricketArchive

== See also ==
- Sunday League
