= 1975 John Player League =

- Administrator: Test and County Cricket Board
- Cricket format: Limited overs cricket (40 overs per innings)
- Tournament format: League
- Champions: Hampshire (1st title)
- Participants: 17
- Matches: 136
- Most runs: 689 Barry Richards (Hampshire)
- Most wickets: 29 Howard Cooper (Yorks)/Tony Brown (Gloucesters)

The 1975 John Player League was the seventh competing of what was generally known as the Sunday League. The competition was won for the first time by Hampshire County Cricket Club.

== Standings ==
| Team | Pld | W | T | L | N/R | A | Pts | R/R |
|---|---|---|---|---|---|---|---|---|
| Hampshire (C) | 16 | 13 | 0 | 3 | 0 | 0 | 52 | 5.234 |
| Worcestershire | 16 | 12 | 1 | 3 | 0 | 0 | 50 | 4.876 |
| Kent | 16 | 12 | 0 | 4 | 0 | 0 | 48 | 4.636 |
| Essex | 16 | 10 | 0 | 6 | 0 | 0 | 40 | 4.852 |
| Nottinghamshire | 16 | 9 | 0 | 7 | 0 | 0 | 36 | 4.135 |
| Warwickshire | 16 | 9 | 0 | 7 | 0 | 0 | 36 | 4.934 |
| Yorkshire | 16 | 9 | 0 | 7 | 0 | 0 | 36 | 4.395 |
| Lancashire | 16 | 8 | 1 | 7 | 0 | 0 | 34 | 4.236 |
| Derbyshire | 16 | 7 | 0 | 8 | 0 | 1 | 30 | 4.182 |
| Middlesex | 16 | 7 | 0 | 9 | 0 | 0 | 28 | 4.502 |
| Sussex | 16 | 6 | 0 | 9 | 0 | 1 | 26 | 4.283 |
| Leicestershire | 16 | 6 | 0 | 10 | 0 | 0 | 24 | 4.217 |
| Surrey | 16 | 6 | 0 | 10 | 0 | 0 | 24 | 4.506 |
| Somerset | 16 | 5 | 1 | 10 | 0 | 0 | 22 | 4.659 |
| Gloucestershire | 16 | 5 | 0 | 11 | 0 | 0 | 20 | 4.562 |
| Northamptonshire | 16 | 5 | 0 | 11 | 0 | 0 | 20 | 4.188 |
| Glamorgan | 16 | 4 | 1 | 11 | 0 | 0 | 18 | 4.148 |
Team marked (C) finished as champions. Source: CricketArchive

== See also ==
Sunday League
