= 1973 County Championship =

English cricket tournament

- Dates: 2 May – 11 September 1973
- Administrator: England and Wales Cricket Board
- Cricket format: First-class cricket
- Tournament format: League system
- Champions: Hampshire (2nd title)
- Participants: 17
- Matches: 168
- Most runs: Gordon Greenidge, (Hampshire); 1,620
- Most wickets: Peter Lee, (Lancashire); 96

The 1973 County Championship was the 74th officially organised running of the County Championship. Hampshire won the Championship title.

== Points system ==
- 10 points for a win
- 5 points to each team for a tie
- 5 points to team still batting in a match in which scores finish level
- Bonus points awarded in first 85 overs of first innings
- Batting: 1 point for 75 runs in first 25 overs
- 1 point for 150 runs in first 50 overs
- 1 point for each 25 runs above 150
- Bowling: 1 point for every 2 wickets taken
- No bonus points awarded in a match starting with less than 8 hours' play remaining.
- Position determined by points gained. If equal, then decided on most wins.
- Each team plays 20 matches.
- All counties required to achieve an overall average of at least 18.5 overs per hour. Teams failing to reach this rate fined £500, the total of all such fines being shared equally between those teams averaging 19.5 overs per hour or better.

== Table ==
	Team	P	W	L	D	T	Bat	Bowl	Pts
1	Hampshire	20	10	0	10	0	84	81	265
2	Surrey	20	9	3	8	0	71	73	234
3	Northamptonshire	20	8	4	8	0	53	75	208
4	Kent	20	4	3	13	0	98	59	197
5	Gloucestershire	19	6	4	9	0	63	70	193
6	Worcestershire	20	6	4	10	0	56	75	191
7	Warwickshire	20	5	5	10	0	74	62	186
8	Essex	20	6	5	9	0	46	72	178
9	Leicestershire	19	4	3	12	0	66	60	166
10	Somerset	20	7	2	11	0	29	60	159
11	Glamorgan	20	4	8	8	0	44	68	152
12	Lancashire	20	4	6	10	0	44	67	151
13	Middlesex	20	4	5	10	1	49	54	148
14	Yorkshire	20	3	5	11	1	28	69	132
15	Sussex	20	2	10	8	0	42	67	129
16	Derbyshire	20	2	10	8	0	15	67	102
17	Nottinghamshire	20	1	8	11	0	28	63	101
