= 1961 County Championship =

English cricket tournament

- Dates: 29 April – 5 September 1961
- Cricket format: First-class cricket
- Tournament format: League system
- Champions: Hampshire (1st title)
- Participants: 17
- Matches: 254
- Most runs: Bill Alley, (Somerset); 2,532
- Most wickets: Derek Shackleton, (Hampshire); 153

The 1961 County Championship was the 62nd officially organised running of the County Championship. Hampshire won their first ever Championship title.

For the 1961 season, the follow-on was abolished in the County Championship, when play took place on the first day of matches. Teams were able to forfeit their second innings, but none did so.

== Table ==
- 12 points for a win
- 6 points to team still batting in the fourth innings of a match in which scores finish level
- 2 points for first innings lead
- 2 bonus points for team leading on first innings if they also score faster on runs per over in first innings
- If no play possible on the first two days, and the match does not go into the second innings, the team leading on first innings scores 8 points.
- Teams played either 28 or 32 matches. Therefore, a final average was calculated by dividing the points by the matches played which determined the final placings.

	Team	P	W	L	D	No Dec	1st Inns Lead	Bonus	Pts	Average
1	Hampshire	32	19	7	6	0	4	32	268	8.37
2	Yorkshire	32	17	5	10	0	6	34	250	7.81
3	Middlesex	28	15	6	6	1	4	26	214	7.64
4	Worcestershire	32	16	9	7	0	5	24	226	7.06
=5	Gloucestershire	28	11	11	5	1	4	18	158	5.64
=5	Essex	28	10	8	10	0	6	26	158	5.64
7	Derbyshire	28	10	9	9	0	6	22	154	5.50
8	Sussex	32	11	10	11	0	9	20	170	5.31
9	Leicestershire	28	9	13	5	1	6	26	146	5.21
10	Somerset	32	10	15	7	0	9	24	162	5.06
11	Kent	28	8	8	12	0	8	20	132	4.71
12	Warwickshire	32	9	10	13	0	8	26	150	4.68
13	Lancashire	32	9	7	15	1	8	18	142	4.43
14	Glamorgan	32	9	12	11	0	5	10	128	4.00
15	Surrey	28	4	13	11	0	14	24	100	3.57
16	Northamptonshire	28	5	13	10	0	6	10	82	2.92
17	Nottinghamshire	28	4	20	4	0	8	12	76	2.71
