= Nick Pocock =

Venezuelan-born cricketer (born 1951)

Personal information
- Full name: Nicholas Edward Julian Pocock
- Born: 15 December 1951 (age 74); Maracaibo, Zulia, Venezuela
- Batting: Right-handed
- Bowling: Left-arm medium

Domestic team information
- Years: Team
- 1976–1984: Hampshire

Career statistics
Competition	First-class	List A
Matches	127	105
Runs scored	3,790	1,346
Batting average	23.10	21.36
100s/50s	2/18	–/3
Top score	164	73*
Balls bowled	554	18
Wickets	4	0
Bowling average	99.00	–
5 wickets in innings	–	–
10 wickets in match	–	–
Best bowling	1/4	–
Catches/stumpings	124/–	42/–
- Source: Cricinfo, 30 August 2009

Nicholas Edward Julian Pocock (born 15 December 1951) is an English former first-class cricketer who played county cricket for Hampshire between 1976 and 1984, making over a hundred appearances in both first-class and one-day cricket. He served as Hampshire captain from 1980 and 1984, having succeeded Bob Stephenson. He later served as president of Hampshire and sat on the committee of the Marylebone Cricket Club.

== Cricket career ==
Pocock was born in Venezuela at Maracaibo in December 1951. He was educated in England at Shrewsbury School. He began his association with Hampshire in 1973, playing for their second eleven. Two years then elapsed before his next appearance for the second eleven in 1975, with Pocock making his first eleven debut in 1976, in a first-class match in the County Championship against Leicestershire at Bournemouth, in which he top-scored in Hampshire's first innings with 68. He made two further first-class appearances that season in the County Championship, while in the 1977 County Championship he made seven appearances, scoring 265 runs. it was in 1977 that Pocock made his debut in List A one-day cricket, making five one-day appearances. His first match the following season came in a first-class fixture against the touring Pakistanis, with Pocock featuring in the Hampshire side following injuries and the unavailability of regular players. He featured in a further four first-class matches in 1978, three of which were in the County Championship, and later in the season in the final five matches of the John Player League, filling in for Barry Richards following his sudden departure from Hampshire.

Following Richards' departure, Pocock began to appear from regularly for Hampshire in the 1979 season, making twelve first-class and fourteen one-day appearances. Against Middlesex in the 1979 County Championship, he recorded his maiden century with an unbeaten 143, with him scoring 393 first-class runs in 1979. Against Oxford University that season, he equalled the Hampshire first-class record of five outfield catches in an innings when he was fielding at slip. Although by no means a certainty in the Hampshire side, despite his increased playing opportunities in 1979, it came as a surprise when he was chosen to captain Hampshire for the 1980 season following Bob Stephenson's relinquishment of the captaincy. He inherited a Hampshire side which was a stark contrast to their successful team of the early 1970s, ultimately finishing last in the 1980 County Championship. In his inaugural season as captain, he made 24 first-class appearances, scoring 874 runs at an average of 23.62, while in one-day cricket he made 21 appearances, scoring 298 runs at an average of 18.62. He remained as Hampshire captain until the 1984 season, helping lead them to third place finishes in both the 1982 and 1983 County Championship's.

While playing Lancashire in Portsmouth in mid-July 1984, Pocock made his intention to resign the Hampshire captaincy known to Mark Nicholas, who he recommended to replace him. His decision to resign the captaincy was based around his intentions to devote more time to his fledgling business interests. After resigning the captaincy, he did not play for Hampshire again, with a thumb injury ruling him out for the remainder the season. From his debut in 1976, Pocock made 127 appearances in first-class cricket for Hampshire. In these, he scored 3,790 runs at an average of 23.10, making two centuries and eighteen half centuries; his highest score of 164 came against Lancashire in 1982. In one-day cricket, he made 1,346 runs at an average of 21.36, making three half centuries and with a top-score of 73 not out. As a slip fielder, he took 124 catches in first-class cricket, with his reflexes off the bowling of Malcolm Marshall being noted.

== Post-cricket career ==
Following the end of his cricket career, Pocock worked for HSBC Insurance Brokers for over 10 years alongside former Hampshire cricketer Colin Ingleby-Mackenzie. In 1992, he helped set up Sporting Index where he was employed as its marketing director. He later became vice chairman of Hedgehog Risk Solutions, a company specialising in providing bespoke insurance and financing solutions for corporations with sports related exposure.

Pocock succeeded Ingleby-Mackenzie as Hampshire president following his death in 2006, and in 2013 he was elected to the committee of the Marylebone Cricket Club. In November 2020, he was elected the new president of the Cricketer Cup, succeeding Tony Winlaw.

Sporting positions
Preceded by Bob Stephenson	Hampshire cricket captain 1980–1984	Succeeded by Mark Nicholas
