= Giles Cheatle =

English cricketer (1953–2024)

Personal information
- Full name: Robert Giles Lenthall Cheatle
- Born: 31 July 1953; Paddington, London, England
- Died: 22 August 2024 (aged 71)
- Batting: Left-handed
- Bowling: Slow left-arm orthodox
- Relatives: Lauren Cheatle (daughter)

Domestic team information
- Years: Team
- 1974–1979: Sussex
- 1980–1983: Surrey

Career statistics
Competition	First-class	List A
Matches	60	63
Runs scored	338	185
Batting average	13.00	18.50
100s/50s	0/0	0/0
Top score	49	18*
Balls bowled	6,650	2,399
Wickets	104	66
Bowling average	31.75	23.71
5 wickets in innings	6	0
10 wickets in match	0	0
Best bowling	6/32	4/43
Catches/stumpings	54/–	21/–
- Source: Cricinfo, 6 August 2025

Robert Giles Lenthall Cheatle (31 July 1953 – 22 August 2024) was an English cricketer. Cheatle was a left-handed batsman who bowled slow left-arm orthodox. He was born at Paddington, London and is the father of Australian cricketer Lauren Cheatle.

== Sussex ==
Having played for the Sussex Second XI since 1972, Cheatle made his first-class debut for Sussex against Surrey at The Oval in the 1974 County Championship, in what was his only appearance in that season. In the 1975 County Championship he made two first-class appearances against Middlesex and Hampshire, claiming his maiden wicket against Hampshire when he dismissed Barry Richards. In the 1976 County Championship, he made three first-class appearances against Leicestershire, Essex and Kent. It was against Kent that he took his maiden five wicket haul, taking figures of 6/54 in Kent's second-innings.

In the following season, Cheatle became a regular in the Sussex first eleven, making eleven County Championship appearances, taking 23 wickets at an average of 29.17, which included best figures of 5/9 against Warwickshire, which helped Sussex to an innings victory. It was in this same season that he made his List A debut against Somerset in the 1977 John Player League, with him making six further appearances during the tournament. taking 8 wickets at an average of 15.25, with best figures of 4/33. In the 1978 County Championship, he made fifteen first-class appearances, taking 24 wickets, though at a high average than in his previous season, with these wickets coming at an average of 40.33, with best figures of 4/89. This season also saw Cheatle make what would be his highest score in first-class cricket the bat, with 49 against Kent. He also gained an extended run in Sussex's one-day (List A) team, making 24 appearances in total across the Benson & Hedges Cup, John Player League and Gillette Cup, taking 19 wickets at an average of 26.78, with best figures of 2/15. He played in the final of the Gillette Cup at Lord's in that season against Somerset, with him taking the wickets of Brian Rose and Peter Roebuck, finishing with figures of 2/50 from his twelve overs. Sussex won the match by 5 wickets.

The 1979 season was Cheatle's last with Sussex. He made eight first-class appearances in that season, with six appearances coming in the County Championship. He took 21 wickets at an average of 22.23, with best figures of 6/32. One of two five wicket hauls he took in that season, these figures came against Yorkshire. He also made sixteen List A appearances in his final season, again spread over appearances in the Benson & Hedges Cup and John Player League, though he did not feature in the Gillette Cup. He took 17 wickets in these sixteen matches, which came at an average of 26.82, with best figures of 3/28. In total Cheatle made forty first-class appearances for Sussex, scoring 276 runs at a batting average of 12.54. With the ball, he took 77 wickets at an average of 31.28, with best figures of 6/32, one of four five wickets hauls he would take for the county. In List A cricket, he 183 runs at an average of 20.33, with a high score of 18 not out. With the ball, he took 44 wickets at an average of 24.70, with best figures of 4/33.

== Surrey ==
Cheatle joined Surrey for the 1980 season, making his first-class debut for the county against Hampshire at The Oval in that season's County Championship. He made thirteen further first-class appearances in 1980, taking 23 wickets in his debut season at an average of 28.65, with best figures of 5/28. He took two five wicket hauls in this season, with his best figures coming against his former county. In List A cricket, his debut for the county in that format came against Kent in the Benson & Hedges Cup. He made fifteen List A appearances in his debut season with Surrey, taking 22 wickets at an average of 20.81, with best figures of 4/34. He made just one first-class appearance in 1982, against Cambridge University at Fenner's, as well as making a single List A appearance against Leicestershire in the John Player League, which was to be his final appearance in List A cricket. In 1982, he appeared four times in first-class cricket, appearing against Sussex, Lancashire, Middlesex and Kent in the County Championship. He made a single and final first-class appearance in the following season against Oxford University at The Oval. In total, he made twenty first-class appearances for the county, scoring 62 runs at an average of 15.50, with a high score of 27 not out. With the ball, he took 27 wickets at an average of 33.11, with best figures of 5/28, one of two five wicket hauls he took.

== Later life and death ==
After his playing career, Cheatle emigrated to Australia. He died after a long illness on 22 August 2024, at the age of 71. News of his death was not made public until October.
