= Ian King (English cricketer) =

English cricketer (1931–2020)

Personal information
- Full name: Ian Metcalfe King
- Born: 10 November 1931; Leeds, Yorkshire, England
- Died: 31 March 2020 (aged 88)
- Height: 5 ft 11 in (1.80 m)
- Batting: Left-handed
- Bowling: Slow left-arm orthodox

Domestic team information
- Years: Team
- 1952–1955: Warwickshire
- 1957: Essex

Career statistics
| Competition | First-class |
|---|---|
| Matches | 81 |
| Runs scored | 476 |
| Batting average | 8.35 |
| 100s/50s | –/– |
| Top score | 33 |
| Balls bowled | 11,847 |
| Wickets | 129 |
| Bowling average | 28.72 |
| 5 wickets in innings | 1 |
| 10 wickets in match | – |
| Best bowling | 5/59 |
| Catches/stumpings | 60/– |
- Source: Cricinfo, 10 October 2011

Ian Metcalfe King (10 November 1931 – 31 March 2020) was an English cricketer. He was a left-handed batsman who bowled slow left-arm orthodox. He was born at Leeds, Yorkshire.

King attended Hanley Castle Grammar School, where he captained the First XI. He made his first-class debut for Warwickshire against Kent in the 1952 County Championship. He made 52 further first-class appearances for Warwickshire, the last of which came against Essex in the 1955 County Championship.

He took 95 wickets for Warwickshire at an average of 26.94, with best figures of 5/59 against Essex in 1954. This season was also his most successful for Warwickshire, with King maintaining a regular starting place throughout that season. He took 71 wickets at an average of 23.84 in that season. A tailend batsman, King scored 345 runs at an average of 8.21, with a high score of 29 not out. King left Warwickshire at the end of the 1956 season.

He joined Essex in 1957, making his first-class debut for the county against Cambridge University. He made 27 further appearances that season, the last of which came against Surrey in the County Championship. King performed well with the ball in what was his only season with Essex, taking 34 wickets at an average of 33.70, with best figures of 4/25. He scored 131 runs that season at an average of 8.73, with a high score of 33, which was his highest first-class score. Throughout his first-class career he was an able fielder, taking 60 catches. His best season was in 1957, when he held 29 catches in his 28 matches.
