= Brian Timms =

English cricketer (born 1940)

Personal information
- Full name: Brian Stanley Valentine Timms
- Born: 17 December 1940 (age 85); Ropley, Hampshire, England
- Batting: Right-handed
- Role: Wicket-keeper

Domestic team information
- Years: Team
- 1959–1968: Hampshire
- 1969–1971: Warwickshire

Career statistics
Competition	First-class	List A
Matches	232	16
Runs scored	3,657	152
Batting average	15.76	19.00
100s/50s	1/8	–/1
Top score	120	55
Catches/stumpings	456/70	12/2
- Source: Cricinfo, 21 February 2010

Brian Stanley Valentine Timms (born 17 December 1940) is an English former first-class cricketer who played as a wicket-keeper for Hampshire from 1959 to 1968 and Warwickshire from 1969 to 1971.

== Cricket career ==
=== Hampshire ===
Timms was born in December 1940 in Ropley, Hampshire. He began his cricket career at Hampshire as an apprentice to wicket-keeper Leo Harrison, who Timms would replace after he retired. He played for Hampshire in the inaugural season of the Second XI Championship in 1959, and in that same season he played two first-class matches against Cambridge University and Oxford University. Harrison was injured in 1960, and as a result Timms made seventeen first-class appearances, sixteen of which came in the County Championship. In his first Championship match against Nottinghamshire, he claimed six dismissals from behind the stumps in the Nottinghamshire first innings. Following the end of the 1960 season, Timms was injured in a motor vehicle accident when the light van he was driving crashed. He sustained facial injuries, for which he was treated at the Royal Hampshire County Hospital. Harrison was again injured for part of the 1961 season, as Hampshire chased their first County Championship title, with Timms deputising in two Championship matches in June. He played a further six matches in 1962, with Harrison retiring at the end of that season.

With Harrison's retirement, Timms became Hampshire's regular wicket-keeper. He played thirty times in 1963, scoring 414 runs at an average of 12.17, while in his capacity as wicket-keeper he took 57 catches and made thirteen stumpings. He played the same number of matches the following season, scoring 595 runs and recording three half centuries, while taking 58 catches and completing nineteen stumpings. He played a further thirty first-class matches in 1965, and although he scored fewer runs (384 at an average of 12.80), he did take more catches behind the stumps, with 73. Against the touring South Africans he made 80 runs, sharing in a partnership of 143 with Geoff Keith (101) to help Hampshire recover from 121 for 6 in their first innings. During the 1965 season, he also made his debut in List A one-day cricket against Norfolk at Southampton in the 1st round of the 1965 Gillette Cup. Over the proceeding three seasons, he made nearly sixty further first-class appearances for Hampshire, and eight further one-day appearances. He remained consistent in first-class cricket, scoring over 1,500 runs from 1966 to 1968, whilst also facilitating over fifty dismissals behind the stumps in each of those seasons. Against Nottinghamshire in the 1967 County Championship, he broke his nose midway through the match when keeping to Peter Sainsbury, with Danny Livingstone deputising for Timms for the remainder of the match.

Timms retired from playing at the end of the 1968 season, in order to concentrate on business commitments. In 208 first-class matches for Hampshire, he scored 3,236 runs at an average of 15.70; he made seven half centuries, alongside a single century score of 120 against Oxford University in Hampshire's opening match in 1966. In one-day cricket, he scored 118 runs at an average of 19.66, making one half century against Sussex in the quarter-final of the 1967 Gillette Cup. He was succeeded as Hampshire's wicket-keeper for the 1969 season by Bob Stephenson. Later in life, he would become a vice-president of Hampshire.

=== Warwickshire ===
Shortly after retiring from the professional game, Timms was approached by Warwickshire to deputise for Alan Smith when he was on Test selection duty; he did not however formally join the staff at Warwickshire. He first represented Warwickshire against Northamptonshire in the 1969 County Championship, covering for Smith until 1971. During that period, he made 24 first-class and seven one-day appearances. In first-class cricket for Warwickshire, he scored 421 runs at an average of 16.19, recording one half century, while as wicket-keeper he took 54 catches and made ten stumpings. In one-day matches, he scored 34 runs and took six dismissals behind the stumps.
