= Alan Mansell =

English cricketer (1951–2010)

Personal information
- Full name: Alan William Mansell
- Born: 19 May 1951; Redhill, Surrey, England
- Died: 22 April 2010 (aged 58); Cuckfield, Sussex, England
- Batting: Right-handed
- Role: Wicket-keeper

Domestic team information
- Years: Team
- 1969–1975: Sussex

Career statistics
Competition	First-class	List A
Matches	58	39
Runs scored	1,098	165
Batting average	15.25	7.17
100s/50s	–/4	–/–
Top score	72*	28
Balls bowled	–	–
Wickets	–	–
Bowling average	–	–
5 wickets in innings	–	–
10 wickets in match	–	–
Best bowling	–	–
Catches/stumpings	109/6	39/5
- Source: Cricinfo, 18 July 2012

Alan William Mansell (19 May 1951 – 22 April 2010) was an English cricketer. Mansell was a right-handed batsman who fielded as a wicket-keeper. He was born at Redhill, Surrey.

Starting his career when Jim Parks Jr. was still Sussex's first choice wicket-keeper, Mansell made his first-class debut for the county against Cambridge University in 1969 at the County Ground, Hove. In 1970, he made three first-class appearances, against Gloucestershire and Middlesex in the County Championship, as well as against the touring Jamaicans. He made two further first-class appearances in the 1971 County Championship, both against Hampshire, as well as playing against Cambridge University. His second appearance against Hampshire at the United Services Recreation Ground, Portsmouth, saw him record his maiden half century, with a score of 51. He didn't feature in first-class cricket in the 1972 season, but did make his List A debut against Worcestershire in the first round of the 1972 Gillette Cup.

He featured more in the 1973 season, with Jim Parks Jr. having left Sussex at the end of the previous season. He made eleven first-class appearances, ten of which came in that season's County Championship, with Mansell scoring 98 runs at an average of 8.16, with a high score of 20 not out, while behind the stumps he took 17 catches and made a single stumping. In List A cricket, he made five appearances, with three coming in the Benson & Hedges Cup and two in the John Player League. Mansell made nineteen appearances in the 1974 County Championship, as well as playing a further first-class match against Oxford University. He scored 470 runs at an average of 17.40, with a high score of 72 not out, which came against Somerset at the County Ground, Hove. He took 32 catches behind the stumps, as well as making 2 stumpings. In List A cricket, he made sixteen appearances, spread across the Benson & Hedges Cup, John Player League and Gillette Cup, scoring 84 runs at an average of 8.40, with a high score of 28, while behind the stumps he took 18 catches and made 2 stumpings.

The 1975 season was to be his last with Sussex, with Mansell making twenty first-class appearances, the last of which came against Lancashire in that season's County Championship. He scored 448 runs in his final season, which came at an average of 16.00, with a high score of 52. One of two half centuries he made that season, this score came against Oxford University. Behind the stumps he took 40 catches. In List A cricket, he made seventeen appearances in that season which were spread across the Benson & Hedges Cup, John Player League and Gillette Cup, with his final appearance coming against Lancashire. He scored 70 runs in his seventeen matches, which came at an average of 7.00, with a high score of 17. In total, Mansell made 58 first-class appearances, scoring 1,098 runs at an average of 15.25, with a high score of 72 not out, which was one of four half centuries he made. Behind the stumps, he took 109 catches and 6 sumpings, This makes him Sussex's fourteenth most successful wicket-keeper in first-class cricket. In List A cricket, he made a total of 39 appearances, scoring 165 runs at an average of 7.17, with a high score of 28. Behind the stumps, he took 39 catches and made 5 stumpings. He is the seventh most successful wicket-keeper for Sussex in List A cricket. He left Sussex at the end of that season and was replaced with Surrey wicket-keeper Arnold Long.

He died at Cuckfield, Sussex, on 22 April 2010, following a battle with Parkinson's disease.
