= John Southern (cricketer, born 1952) =

English cricketer

Personal information
- Full name: John William Southern
- Born: 2 September 1952 (age 74); King's Cross, London, England
- Batting: Right-handed
- Bowling: Slow left-arm orthodox

Domestic team information
- Years: Team
- 1975–1983: Hampshire

Career statistics
Competition	First-class	List A
Matches	164	25
Runs scored	1,653	52
Batting average	15.30	10.40
100s/50s	0/3	0/0
Top score	61*	15*
Balls bowled	28,757	945
Wickets	412	14
Bowling average	29.81	44.57
5 wickets in innings	17	0
10 wickets in match	0	0
Best bowling	6/46	2/34
Catches/stumpings	59/–	9/–
- Source: Cricinfo, 21 October 2009

John William Southern (born 2 September 1952) is an English former first-class cricketer. He played county cricket as a slow left-arm orthodox bowler for Hampshire between 1975 and 1983, making 164 first-class and 25 one-day appearances. In first-class cricket, he took over 400 wickets. After retiring following the 1983 season, Southern briefly coached cricket at The Portsmouth Grammar School, before emigrating to New Zealand.

== Cricket ==
=== Playing career ===
John William Southern was born on 2 September 1952 in King's Cross, London. He studied at the University of Southampton, from where he graduated. Southern signed a one-year contract with Hampshire in December 1974, initially as an understudy to Hampshire's established spin-bowler Peter Sainsbury. He made his debut in first-class cricket for Hampshire against Gloucestershire at Bristol in the 1975 County Championship, making 13 appearances in the Championship. He took 44 wickets at an average of 27.11 with his slow left-arm orthodox bowling, taking two five-wicket hauls. He took 6 for 46 against Gloucestershire in the return fixture at Bournemouth in July, a bowling display that the Western Daily Press said had "bemused" the Gloucestershire batsmen. Later in the season against Surrey, he took 6 for 53. Southern also made his debut in List A one-day cricket in 1975, playing once against Derbyshire at Darley Dale in the John Player League. The following season, he made 20 first-class appearances, with 19 coming in the County Championship; he took 57 wickets in these, averaging 33.05. He featured in 11 one-day matches in 1976, the most in a season during his career, taking 9 wickets at an average of 36.44.

Southern made 22 first-class appearances in 1977, but did not feature in one-day cricket. He took 53 wickets at an average of 31.32, taking five or more wickets twice. his 6 for 81 in a drawn match against Somerset in the County Championship came from 39 overs. Following the season, Southern opted to stay at Hampshire after turning down the opportunity to pursue a one-year diploma course at the University of Oxford. In 23 first-class appearances in 1978, he took 76 wickets at an average of 24.11, claiming five wickets in an innings on four occasions; he was Hampshire's leading wicket-taker in the County Championship, with 72 from 21 matches. Southern scored his first half-century during the season, making 51 runs in a defeat against Gloucestershire, forming part of an 83 runs stand for the final wicket with Mike Taylor. He returned to one-day cricket during the season, making two appearances. Alongside fellow spinner Nigel Cowley, Southern was awarded his county cap in June.

Southern made fewer first-class appearances in 1979, after being afflicted with appendicitis at the end of July and requiring an operation. He took 29 wickets from 16 matches at an average of 32.79, with his only five wicket haul (6 for 81) coming against Derbyshire in the County Championship. He made the highest first-class score of his career during the season, scoring an unbeaten 61 runs against Yorkshire. He played two one-day matches, one each in the Benson & Hedges Cup and the Gillette Cup. His 51 wickets came at an average of exactly 30 from 22 first-class matches in 1980, taking five or more wickets twice. In six one-day appearances, he took only two wickets, at 68 runs apiece. At the end of the season, he expressed a desire to leave Hampshire and seek a career away from cricket, but changed his mind in December and signed a new contract. Southern made 13 first-class appearances in 1981, taking 20 wickets at an average of 47.60. His bowling form recovered in 1982, with him taking 55 wickets at an average of 23.89 from 19 first-class matches, taking five wickets in an innings twice. He scored 300 runs for the only time in his career in the 1982 season. The following season, he made 15 first-class appearances, taking 27 wickets at an average of 35.77, again taking five wickets in an innings twice. Between 1981 and 1983, he had made just three one-day appearances. Southern retired from playing in September 1983, with Hampshire releasing him from the remainder of his contract.

After the conclusion of his professional career, Southern played club cricket in Southampton for Deanery, and coached at The Portsmouth Grammar School until 1985. He later emigrated to New Zealand. By 2000, he was living in Auckland.

=== Playing style and statistics ===
Southern was a tall slow left-arm orthodox spin bowler, who was capable of bowling for long periods. With Cowley, he formed what The Birmingham Post described as a "modest" bowling partnership. Southern made 164 appearances in first-class cricket, taking 412 wickets at an average of 29.81; he took five or more wickets in an innings on 15 occasions. As a right-handed tail-end batsman, he scored 1,653 runs at an average of 15.30, making three fifties. Fielding in first-class cricket, he took 59 catches. He was seldom used in one-day cricket, making 25 appearances, and taking 14 wickets at an average of 44.57.

== Works cited ==
- Nicholas, Mark (2017). A Beautiful Game: My Love Affair with Cricket. London: Allen & Unwin. ISBN 978-1-7602-9271-3 – via Internet Archive.
