= 1995 County Championship =

English cricket tournament

- Dates: 27 April – 18 September 1995
- Administrator: England and Wales Cricket Board
- Cricket format: First-class cricket
- Tournament format: League system
- Champions: Warwickshire (5th title)
- Participants: 18
- Matches: 153
- Most runs: Mark Ramprakash, (Middlesex); 2,147
- Most wickets: Anil Kumble, (Northamptonshire); 105

The 1995 Britannic Assurance County Championship was the 96th officially organised running of the County Championship. Warwickshire won the Championship title for the second successive season.

The Championship was sponsored by Britannic Assurance for the twelfth season.

== Table ==
- 16 points for a win
- 8 points to each team for a tie
- 8 points to team still batting in a match in which scores finish level
- Bonus points awarded in first 120 overs of first innings
  - Batting:
    - 200 runs – 1 point
    - 250 runs – 2 points
    - 300 runs – 3 points
    - 350 runs – 4 points
  - Bowling:
    - 3 or 4 wickets – 1 point,
    - 5 or 6 wickets – 2 points
    - 7 or 8 wickets – 3 points
    - 9 or 10 wickets – 4 points
- No bonus points awarded in a match starting with less than 8 hours' play remaining. A one-innings match is played, with the winner gaining 12 points.
- Position determined by points gained. If equal, then decided on most wins.

	Team	P	W	L	D	Bat	Bowl	Pts
1	Warwickshire	17	14	2	1	49	64	337
2	Middlesex	17	12	2	3	51	62	305
3	Northamptonshire	17	12	2	3	41	57	290
4	Lancashire	17	10	4	3	48	61	269
5	Essex	17	8	9	0	42	58	228
6	Gloucestershire	17	8	4	5	45	50	223
7	Leicestershire	17	7	8	2	41	61	214
8	Yorkshire	17	7	8	2	39	55	206
9	Somerset	17	7	5	5	40	49	201
10	Worcestershire	17	6	7	4	29	57	182
11	Nottinghamshire	17	5	9	3	41	54	175
12	Surrey	17	5	8	4	34	55	169
13	Hampshire	17	5	8	4	32	56	168
14	Derbyshire	17	4	10	3	39	64	167
15	Sussex	17	4	7	6	37	51	152
16	Glamorgan	17	3	8	6	40	57	145
17	Durham	17	4	13	0	20	53	137
18	Kent	17	3	9	5	40	44	132

== Notable events ==
- An exceptionally hot and dry summer with few interruptions from rain and many dry pitches led to several notable records
  - Warwickshire, in winning outright fourteen of seventeen games, achieved the highest percentage of wins in Championship history, beating Surrey who won 23 of 28 games in 1955
  - Essex and Durham became the first counties to finish a season without a single draw since Surrey in 1955.
  - Overall, the proportion of finished matches — 124 of 153 — was the greatest since 1921.
- June 15: In the match between Northamptonshire and Essex at Luton, thirty wickets fall on the first day — the most in a Championship match since 1946 — and Northamptionshire win after being dismissed for 46 in their first innings. This was the lowest first innings score from which a team has come back to win since Warwickshire won after being dismissed for 45 against Yorkshire in 1934.
- August 23–26: Gloucestershire's Andrew Symonds set a new record of sixteen sixes in an innings ans twenty in a match against Glamorgan at Abergavenny
- August 24–28: Nottinghamshire lose by an innings to Northamptonshire after playing a first innings of 527 — to which Northamptonshire replies with 781 for 7. This is the highest score, first or second innings, by a team losing by an innings in first-class cricket.
