= David Goodchild =

English cricketer

Personal information
- Full name: David John Goodchild
- Born: 17 September 1976 (age 50); Harrow, Middlesex, England
- Nickname: G, Golden, G Man
- Height: 6 ft 2 in (1.88 m)
- Batting: Right-handed
- Bowling: Right-arm medium

Domestic team information
- Years: Team
- 1999–2000: Middlesex Cricket Board
- 1996–1999: Middlesex

Career statistics
Competition	First-class	List A
Matches	9	8
Runs scored	354	91
Batting average	20.82	22.75
100s/50s	1/2	–/–
Top score	105	38*
Balls bowled	131	–
Wickets	–	–
Bowling average	–	–
5 wickets in innings	–	–
10 wickets in match	–	–
Best bowling	–	–
Catches/stumpings	1/–	6/–
- Source: Cricinfo, 16 March 2012

David John Goodchild (born 17 September 1976) is a former English cricketer. Goodchild was a right-handed opening-batsman who bowled right-arm medium pace. He was born at Harrow, Middlesex. He was educated at Whitmore High School, Weald College, and the University of North London.

Goodchild made his first-class debut for Middlesex against Gloucestershire in the 1996 County Championship. He next appeared for Middlesex in first-class cricket in the 1998 County Championship against Yorkshire; despite being dismissed for a duck by Chris Silverwood in the Middlesex's first-innings, he did record his maiden first-class fifty in their second-innings, with a score of 83 not out. In the following first-class fixture against the touring Sri Lankans, he recorded what would be his only first-class century, with a score of 105 in Middlesex's first-innings. However, the promise he showed in these two matches receded, with him passing fifty only once more in the six further first-class matches he played, with his final first-class appearance coming against Cambridge University in 1999. In his nine first-class appearances for Middlesex, he scored a total of 354 runs at an average of 20.82. Goodchild also played List A cricket for the county, with his debut in that format coming against Surrey in the 1998 AXA Life League. He made seven further List A appearances, the last of which came against Nottinghamshire in the 1999 CGU National League. In his eight appearances in that format, he scored a total of 91 runs at an average of 22.75, with a high score of 38 not out. Having featured for the Middlesex Cricket Board in an MCCA Knockout Trophy fixture against Hertfordshire in 1999, he featured in two further matches for the team in the 2000 MCCA Knockout Trophy, against Suffolk and Huntingdonshire. He didn't feature for Middlesex in that season, and was released at the end of that season.
