= 1992 County Championship =

English cricket tournament

- Dates: 25 April – 15 September 1992
- Administrator: England and Wales Cricket Board
- Cricket format: First-class cricket
- Tournament format: League system
- Champions: Essex (6th title)
- Participants: 18
- Matches: 198
- Most runs: Mike Gatting, (Middlesex); 1,980
- Most wickets: Courtney Walsh, (Gloucestershire); 92

The 1992 Britannic Assurance County Championship was the 93rd officially organised running of the County Championship. Essex won the Championship title.

Durham entered the Championship for the first time. This was the first time that a new county had been admitted to the championship for 71 years since Glamorgan in 1921.

The Championship was sponsored by Britannic Assurance for the ninth time.

== Table ==
- 16 points for a win
- 8 points to each team for a tie
- 8 points to team still batting in a match in which scores finish level
- Bonus points awarded in the first 100 overs of the first innings
  - Batting: 150 runs - 1 point, 200 runs - 2 points 250 runs - 3 points, 300 runs - 4 points
  - Bowling: 3-4 wickets - 1 point, 5-6 wickets - 2 points 7-8 wickets - 3 points, 9-10 wickets - 4 points
- No bonus points awarded in a match starting with less than 8 hours' play remaining. A one-innings match is played, with the winner gaining 12 points.
- Position determined by points gained. If equal, then decided on most wins.
- Each team plays 22 matches.

	Team	P	W	L	D	Bat	Bowl	Pts
1	Essex	22	11	6	5	60	64	300
2	Kent	22	9	3	10	60	55	259
3	Northamptonshire	22	8	4	10	62	58	248
4	Nottinghamshire	22	7	7	8	54	58	224
5	Derbyshire	22	7	6	9	47	63	222
6	Warwickshire	22	6	8	8	55	68	219
7	Sussex	22	6	7	9	60	61	217
8	Leicestershire	22	7	7	8	39	60	211
9	Somerset	22	5	4	13	64	62	206
10	Gloucestershire	22	6	6	9	48	58	202
11	Middlesex	22	5	3	14	62	60	202
12	Lancashire	22	4	6	12	73	51	188
13	Surrey	22	5	7	10	56	50	186
14	Glamorgan	22	5	4	13	53	49	182
15	Hampshire	22	4	6	12	61	57	182
16	Yorkshire	22	4	6	12	56	52	172
17	Worcestershire	22	3	4	14	54	65	167
18	Durham	22	2	10	10	46	53	131
