= 1986 County Championship =

English cricket tournament

- Dates: 26 April – 16 September 1986
- Administrator: England and Wales Cricket Board
- Cricket format: First-class cricket
- Tournament format: League system
- Champions: Essex (4th title)
- Participants: 17
- Matches: 204
- Most runs: Graeme Hick, (Worcestershire); 1,934
- Most wickets: Courtney Walsh, (Gloucestershire); 118

The 1986 Britannic Assurance County Championship was the 87th officially organised running of the County Championship. Essex won the Championship title.

The Championship was sponsored by Britannic Assurance for the third time and a £1 million, three-year deal was announced.

== Table ==
- 16 points for a win
- 8 points to each team for a tie
- 8 points to team still batting in a match in which scores finish level
- Bonus points awarded in the first 100 overs of the first innings
  - Batting: 150 runs - 1 point, 200 runs - 2 points 250 runs - 3 points, 300 runs - 4 points
  - Bowling: 3-4 wickets - 1 point, 5-6 wickets - 2 points 7-8 wickets - 3 points, 9-10 wickets - 4 points
- No bonus points awarded in a match starting with less than 8 hours' play remaining. A one-innings match is played, with the winner gaining 12 points.
- Position determined by points gained. If equal, then decided on most wins.
- Each team plays 24 matches.

	Team	P	W	L	D	Bat	Bowl	Pts
1	Essex	24	10	6	8	51	76	287
2	Gloucestershire	24	9	3	12	50	65	259
3	Surrey	24	8	6	10	54	66	248
4	Nottinghamshire	24	7	2	15	55	80	247
5	Worcestershire	24	7	5	12	58	72	242
6	Hampshire	24	7	4	12	54	69	235
7	Leicestershire	24	5	7	12	55	67	202
8	Kent	24	5	7	12	42	75	197
9	Northamptonshire	24	5	3	16	53	60	193
10	Yorkshire	24	4	5	15	62	59	193
11	Derbyshire	24	5	5	14	42	70	188
12	Middlesex	24	4	5	11	47	65	176
13	Warwickshire	24	4	9	15	61	51	176
14	Sussex	24	4	5	12	46	56	166
15	Lancashire	24	4	7	14	41	51	156
16	Somerset	24	3	5	13	52	52	152
17	Glamorgan	24	2	7	15	39	47	118
