= 1984 County Championship =

English cricket tournament

- Dates: 28 April – 11 September 1984
- Administrator: England and Wales Cricket Board
- Cricket format: First-class cricket
- Tournament format: League system
- Champions: Essex (3rd title)
- Participants: 17
- Matches: 204
- Most runs: Graham Gooch, (Essex); 2,281
- Most wickets: Richard Hadlee, (Nottinghamshire); 117

The 1984 Britannic Assurance County Championship was the 85th officially organised running of the County Championship. Essex won their second successive Championship title.

The Championship was sponsored by Britannic Assurance for the first time.

== Table ==
- 16 points for a win
- 8 points to each team for a tie
- 8 points to team still batting in a match in which scores finish level
- Bonus points awarded in the first 100 overs of the first innings
  - Batting: 150 runs - 1 point, 200 runs - 2 points 250 runs - 3 points, 300 runs - 4 points
  - Bowling: 3-4 wickets - 1 point, 5-6 wickets - 2 points 7-8 wickets - 3 points, 9-10 wickets - 4 points
- No bonus points awarded in a match starting with less than 8 hours' play remaining. A one-innings match is played, with the winner gaining 12 points.
- Position determined by points gained. If equal, then decided on most wins.
- Each team plays 24 matches.

	Team	P	W	L	D	T	Bat	Bowl	Pts
1	Essex	24	13	3	8	0	64	83	355
2	Nottinghamshire	24	12	3	9	0	68	81	341
3	Middlesex	24	8	7	9	0	63	78	269
4	Leicestershire	24	8	2	14	0	60	78	266
5	Kent	24	8	3	11	2	45	65	254
6	Sussex	24	7	6	10	1	54	79	249
7	Somerset	24	6	7	11	0	60	78	234
8	Surrey	24	6	6	12	0	62	72	230
9	Warwickshire	24	6	7	11	0	71	60	227
10	Worcestershire	24	5	5	14	0	66	74	220
11	Northamptonshire	24	5	9	9	1	58	56	202
12	Derbyshire	24	4	6	14	0	72	66	202
13	Glamorgan	24	4	2	18	0	65	71	200
14	Yorkshire	24	5	4	15	0	59	55	194
15	Hampshire	24	3	13	8	0	58	62	168
16	Lancashire	24	1	9	14	0	49	72	137
17	Gloucestershire	24	1	10	13	0	56	61	133
