= 1987 County Championship =

English cricket tournament

- Dates: 25 April – 15 September 1987
- Administrator: England and Wales Cricket Board
- Cricket format: First-class cricket
- Tournament format: League system
- Champions: Nottinghamshire (4th title)
- Participants: 17
- Matches: 202
- Most runs: Graeme Hick, (Worcestershire); 1,868
- Most wickets: Neal Radford, (Worcestershire); 109

The 1987 Britannic Assurance County Championship was the 88th officially organised running of the County Championship. Nottinghamshire won the Championship title.

The Championship was sponsored by Britannic Assurance for the fourth time.

== Table ==
- 16 points for a win
- 8 points to each team for a tie
- 8 points to team still batting in a match in which scores finish level
- Bonus points awarded in the first 100 overs of the first innings
  - Batting: 150 runs - 1 point, 200 runs - 2 points 250 runs - 3 points, 300 runs - 4 points
  - Bowling: 3-4 wickets - 1 point, 5-6 wickets - 2 points 7-8 wickets - 3 points, 9-10 wickets - 4 points
- No bonus points awarded in a match starting with less than 8 hours' play remaining. A one-innings match is played, with the winner gaining 12 points.
- Position determined by points gained. If equal, then decided on most wins.
- Each team plays 24 matches.

	Team	P	W	L	D	Bat	Bowl	Pts
1	Nottinghamshire	23	9	1	13	68	80	292
2	Lancashire	24	10	4	10	55	73	288
3	Leicestershire	24	8	3	13	57	75	260
4	Surrey	24	7	4	13	65	73	250
5	Hampshire	24	7	3	14	59	73	244
6	Derbyshire	23	6	5	12	51	70	225
7	Northamptonshire	24	7	4	13	48	68	224
8	Yorkshire	24	7	3	13	52	58	222
9	Worcestershire	24	5	4	15	58	68	206
10	Gloucestershire	24	5	8	10	62	50	200
11	Somerset	24	2	3	19	61	70	163
12	Essex	24	2	4	18	45	77	162
13	Glamorgan	24	3	9	12	40	70	158
14	Kent	24	2	7	15	53	66	151
15	Warwickshire	24	2	7	15	48	67	147
16	Middlesex	24	2	8	13	47	60	139
17	Sussex	24	1	8	14	47	56	119
