= 1996 County Championship =

English cricket tournament

- Dates: 2 May – 22 September 1996
- Administrator: England and Wales Cricket Board
- Cricket format: First-class cricket
- Tournament format: League system
- Champions: Leicestershire (2nd title)
- Participants: 18
- Matches: 153
- Most runs: Graham Gooch, (Essex); 1,994
- Most wickets: Courtney Walsh, (Gloucestershire); 85

The 1996 Britannic Assurance County Championship was the 97th officially organised running of the County Championship. Leicestershire won the Championship.

The Championship was sponsored by Britannic Assurance for the thirteenth season.

== Table ==
- 16 points for a win
- 8 points to each team for a tie
- 8 points to team still batting in a match in which scores finish level
- 3 points for a draw
- 3 points for a match abandoned without a ball bowled
- Bonus points awarded in first 120 overs of first innings
  - Batting:
    - 200 runs – 1 point
    - 250 runs – 2 points
    - 300 runs – 3 points
    - 350 runs – 4 points
  - Bowling:
    - 3 or 4 wickets – 1 point,
    - 5 or 6 wickets – 2 points
    - 7 or 8 wickets – 3 points
    - 9 or 10 wickets – 4 points
- No bonus points awarded in a match starting with less than 8 hours' play remaining. A one-innings match is played, with the winner gaining 12 points.
- Position determined by points gained.
  - If equal, then decided on most wins.

	Team	P	W	L	D	Bat	Bowl	Pts
1	Leicestershire	17	10	1	6	57	61	296
2	Derbyshire	17	9	3	5	52	58	269
3	Surrey	17	8	2	7	49	64	262
4	Kent	17	9	2	6	47	52	261
5	Essex	17	8	5	4	58	57	255
6	Yorkshire	17	8	5	4	50	58	248
7	Worcestershire	17	6	4	7	45	60	222
8	Warwickshire	17	7	6	4	39	55	218
9	Middlesex	17	7	6	4	30	59	213
10	Glamorgan	17	6	5	6	50	43	207
11	Somerset	17	5	6	6	38	61	197
12	Sussex	17	6	9	2	36	58	196
13	Gloucestershire	17	5	7	5	23	59	177
14	Hampshire	17	3	7	7	41	56	166
15	Lancashire	17	2	6	9	49	52	160
16	Northamptonshire	17	3	8	6	36	57	159
17	Nottinghamshire	17	1	9	7	42	52	131
18	Durham	17	0	12	5	22	60	97

== Season notes ==
- In response to the very early finishing of many games in 1995, three points was now awarded for a drawn or abandoned game to encourage teams to battle to the end. The move gained support from the press after the season.
- Durham became the first team to finish winless since Warwickshire in 1982
