= 1985 County Championship =

English county cricket championship

- Dates: 27 April – 17 September 1985
- Administrator: England and Wales Cricket Board
- Cricket format: First-class cricket
- Tournament format: League system
- Champions: Middlesex (8th title)
- Participants: 17
- Matches: 204
- Most runs: Derek Randall, (Nottinghamshire); 1,977
- Most wickets: Neal Radford, (Worcestershire); 100

The 1985 Britannic Assurance County Championship was the 86th officially organised running of the County Championship. Middlesex won the Championship title.

The Championship was sponsored by Britannic Assurance for the second time with the winners of the championship receiving £20,000.

== Table ==
- 16 points for a win
- 8 points to each team for a tie
- 8 points to team still batting in a match in which scores finish level
- Bonus points awarded in the first 100 overs of the first innings
  - Batting: 150 runs - 1 point, 200 runs - 2 points 250 runs - 3 points, 300 runs - 4 points
  - Bowling: 3-4 wickets - 1 point, 5-6 wickets - 2 points 7-8 wickets - 3 points, 9-10 wickets - 4 points
- No bonus points awarded in a match starting with less than 8 hours' play remaining. A one-innings match is played, with the winner gaining 12 points.
- Position determined by points gained. If equal, then decided on most wins.
- Each team plays 24 matches.

	Team	P	W	L	D	Bat	Bowl	Pts
1	Middlesex	24	8	4	12	61	85	274
2	Hampshire	24	7	2	15	66	78	256
3	Gloucestershire	24	7	3	14	51	78	241
4	Essex	24	7	2	14	42	70	224
5	Worcestershire	24	5	6	13	65	68	221
6	Surrey	24	5	5	14	62	76	218
7	Sussex	24	6	1	16	52	57	205
8	Nottinghamshire	24	4	2	18	66	69	199
9	Kent	24	4	5	15	51	71	186
10	Northamptonshire	24	5	4	15	52	51	183
11	Yorkshire	24	3	4	16	58	59	165
12	Glamorgan	24	4	4	16	43	48	163
13	Derbyshire	24	3	7	14	46	69	163
14	Lancashire	24	3	7	14	44	67	159
15	Warwickshire	24	2	8	14	47	74	153
16	Leicestershire	24	2	3	19	48	65	145
17	Somerset	24	1	7	16	70	45	131
