= 1991 County Championship =

English cricket tournament

- Dates: 27 April – 20 September 1991
- Administrator: England and Wales Cricket Board
- Cricket format: First-class cricket
- Tournament format: League system
- Champions: Essex (5th title)
- Participants: 17
- Matches: 187
- Most runs: Jimmy Cook, (Somerset); 2,370
- Most wickets: Waqar Younis, (Surrey); 113

The 1991 Britannic Assurance County Championship was the 92nd officially organised running of the County Championship. Essex won the Championship title.

The Championship was sponsored by Britannic Assurance for the eighth time.

== Table ==
- 16 points for a win
- 8 points to each team for a tie
- 8 points to team still batting in a match in which scores finish level
- Bonus points awarded in the first 100 overs of the first innings
  - Batting: 150 runs - 1 point, 200 runs - 2 points 250 runs - 3 points, 300 runs - 4 points
  - Bowling: 3-4 wickets - 1 point, 5-6 wickets - 2 points 7-8 wickets - 3 points, 9-10 wickets - 4 points
- No bonus points awarded in a match starting with less than 8 hours' play remaining. A one-innings match is played, with the winner gaining 12 points.
- Position determined by points gained. If equal, then decided on most wins.

	Team	P	W	L	D	T	Bat	Bowl	Pts
1	Essex	22	11	5	6	0	69	67	312
2	Warwickshire	22	11	4	7	0	58	65	299
3	Derbyshire	22	9	5	8	0	46	68	258
4	Nottinghamshire	22	7	5	10	0	64	69	245
5	Surrey	22	8	6	8	0	47	66	241
6	Kent	22	6	3	12	1	50	55	209
7	Worcestershire	22	6	4	12	0	54	59	209
8	Lancashire	22	6	9	7	0	60	49	205
9	Hampshire	22	5	7	10	0	57	56	193
10	Northamptonshire	22	5	6	11	0	55	54	189
11	Sussex	22	4	3	14	1	57	60	189
12	Glamorgan	22	5	5	12	0	50	57	187
13	Gloucestershire	22	5	10	7	0	42	53	175
14	Yorkshire	22	4	6	12	0	58	37	159
15	Middlesex	22	3	9	10	0	48	63	159
16	Leicestershire	22	3	8	11	0	46	53	147
17	Somerset	22	2	5	15	0	66	45	143
