= 1997 County Championship =

English cricket tournament

- Dates: 23 April – 26 September 1997
- Administrator: England and Wales Cricket Board
- Cricket format: First-class cricket
- Tournament format: League system
- Champions: Glamorgan (3rd title)
- Participants: 18
- Matches: 153
- Most runs: Steve James, (Glamorgan); 1,605
- Most wickets: Mike Smith, (Gloucestershire); 78

The 1997 Britannic Assurance County Championship was the 98th officially organised running of the County Championship. Glamorgan won the Championship.

The Championship was sponsored by Britannic Assurance for the 14th time.

== Table ==
Points awarded:

- 16 points for a win
- 8 points to each team for a tie
- 8 points to team still batting in a match in which scores finish level
- 3 points for a draw
- 3 points for a match abandoned without a ball bowled
- Bonus points awarded in first 120 overs of first innings
  - Batting:
    - 200 runs – 1 point
    - 250 runs – 2 points
    - 300 runs – 3 points
    - 350 runs – 4 points
  - Bowling:
    - 3 or 4 wickets – 1 point,
    - 5 or 6 wickets – 2 points
    - 7 or 8 wickets – 3 points
    - 9 or 10 wickets – 4 points
- No bonus points awarded in a match starting with less than 8 hours' play remaining. A one-innings match is played, with the winner gaining 12 points.
- Position determined by points gained.
  - If equal, then decided on most wins.

Pos	Team	P	W	L	D	Bat	Bowl	Pts
1	Glamorgan	17	8	2	7	50	57	256
2	Kent	17	8	4	4	44	60	252
3	Worcestershire	17	6	3	7	49	54	228
4=	Middlesex	17	7	4	6	33	56	219
4=	Warwickshire	17	7	2	8	32	51	219
6	Yorkshire	17	6	3	8	41	54	215
7	Gloucestershire	17	6	6	4	35	60	206
8=	Essex	17	5	6	6	39	55	192
8=	Surrey	17	5	5	7	39	52	192
10	Leicestershire	17	4	1	12	37	54	191
11	Lancashire	17	5	6	6	34	54	186
12	Somerset	17	3	3	11	38	64	183
13	Nottinghamshire	17	4	3	10	26	55	175
14	Hampshire	17	3	5	9	42	41	158
15	Northamptonshire	17	3	5	8	33	48	156
16	Derbyshire	17	2	9	6	32	59	141
17	Durham	17	2	8	7	22	56	131
18	Sussex	17	1	10	6	24	57	115
