= 1994 County Championship =

English cricket tournament

- Dates: 28 April – 19 September 1994
- Cricket format: First-class cricket (4 days)
- Tournament format: League system
- Champions: Warwickshire (4th title)
- Participants: 18
- Matches: 153
- Most runs: Brian Lara (2,066 for Warwickshire)
- Most wickets: Courtney Walsh (89 for Gloucestershire)

The 1994 County Championship, known as the Britannic Assurance County Championship for sponsorship reasons, was the 95th officially organised running of the County Championship, and ran from 28 April to 19 September 1994. Each team played all the others in the division once. Warwickshire County Cricket Club claimed their fourth title as part of their record-breaking treble season.

The Championship was sponsored by Britannic Assurance for the 11th time.

== Table ==
- Pld = Played, W = Wins, L = Losses, D = Draws, A = Abandonments, BatBP = Batting points, BowBP = Bowling points, Pts = Points.
- 16 points for a win
- 8 points to each team for a tie
- 8 points to team still batting in a match in which scores finish level
- Bonus points awarded in first 120 overs of first innings
  - Batting: 200 runs - 1 point, 250 runs - 2 points 300 runs - 3 points, 350 runs - 4 points
  - Bowling: 3-4 wickets - 1 point, 5-6 wickets - 2 points 7-8 wickets - 3 points, 9-10 wickets - 4 points
- No bonus points awarded in a match starting with less than 8 hours' play remaining. A one-innings match is played, with the winner gaining 12 points.
- Position determined by points gained. If equal, then decided on most wins.

	Team	P	W	L	D	A	Bat	Bowl	Pts
1	Warwickshire (C)	17	11	1	5	0	41	55	272
2	Leicestershire	17	8	7	2	0	42	60	230
3	Nottinghamshire	17	8	5	4	0	39	51	218
4	Middlesex	17	7	3	7	0	43	57	212
5	Northamptonshire	17	8	4	5	0	28	53	209
6	Essex	17	7	5	5	0	32	63	207
7	Surrey	17	7	7	3	0	32	57	201
8	Sussex	17	7	5	5	0	28	60	200
9	Kent	17	6	7	4	0	44	58	198
10	Lancashire	17	8	6	3	0	32	59	194 (Note: Lancashire were deducted 25 points for a sub-standard pitch in the match against Middlesex at Old Trafford)
11	Somerset	17	7	7	3	0	32	47	191
12	Gloucestershire	17	5	8	4	0	28	56	172
13	Hampshire	17	4	7	6	0	32	55	159
14	Yorkshire	17	4	6	7	0	38	57	159
15	Worcestershire	17	4	6	7	0	42	52	158
16	Durham	17	4	10	3	0	32	57	153
17	Derbyshire	17	4	9	4	0	25	54	143
18	Glamorgan	17	2	8	7	0	29	50	111

Source: CricketArchive

=== Results ===
	Derbyshire	Durham	Essex	Glamorgan	Gloucester	Hampshire	Kent	Lancashire	Leicester	Middlesex	Northampton	Nottingham	Somerset	Surrey	Sussex	Warwick	Worcester	Yorkshire
Derbyshire		28 Apr-1 May; Durham; 7 wickets	8-12 Sep; Match drawn		4-8 Aug; Derbyshire; 155 runs		18-22 Aug; Kent; 69 runs		9-11 Jun; Leicestershire; 7 wickets	30 Jun-2 Jul; Middlesex inns & 96 runs		26–30 May; Nottinghamshire; 1 wicket				28-30 Jul; Warwickshire; 139 runs	19–23 May; Match drawn	
Durham			5–9 May; Essex; 10 wickets	18-20 Aug; Durham; 3 wickets	19–23 May; Durham; 108 runs			8-9 Sep; Lancashire; 10 wickets	21-23 Jul; Leicestershire inns & 5 runs		9-11 Jun; Durham inns & 87 runs			30 Jun-4 Jul; Surrey; 290 runs				28 Jul-1 Aug; Yorkshire; 116 runs
Essex				14-18 Jul; Essex; 18 runs	2-6 Jun; Match drawn		12–16 May; Essex; 4 wickets	4-6 Aug; Lancashire inns & 60 runs			15-19 Sep; Match drawn	23-27 Jun; Nottinghamshire; 2 wickets		11-15 Aug; Essex inns & 87 runs	30 Aug-2 Sep; Essex; 7 wickets			
Glamorgan	16-20 Jun; Derbyshire; 8 wickets						21-25 Jul; Kent; 94 runs	23-27 Jun; Lancashire; 220 runs	25-29 Aug; Glamorgan; 150 runs				28 Jul-1 Aug; Match drawn	2-6 Jun; Match drawn			8-12 Sep; Match drawn	12–16 May; Match drawn
Gloucestershire				30 Jun-2 Jul; Glamorgan; 9 wickets			28-30 Jul; Kent; 50 runs		30 Aug-2 Sep; Gloucestershire; 102 runs		11-15 Aug; Northamptonshire; 8 wickets		28 Apr-1 May; Gloucestershire; 83 runs	26–30 May; Surrey; 1 wicket	5–9 May; Match drawn	15-19 Sep; Match drawn		21-25 Jul; Gloucestershire; 324 runs
Hampshire	5–9 May; Match drawn	25-29 Aug; Match drawn	28 Apr-1 May; Essex; 8 wickets	15-19 Sep; Match drawn	14-16 Jul; Hampshire; 165 runs					19–23 May; Match drawn	28 Jul-1 Aug; Northamptonshire; 24 runs	9-13 Jun; Match drawn		18-22 Aug; Hampshire inns & 68 runs				
Kent		11-15 Aug; Kent; 9 wickets				4-8 Aug; Hampshire; 18 runs		19–23 May; Match drawn		9-13 Jun; Match drawn		5–7 May; Nottinghamshire; 9 runs	8-12 Sep; Kent inns & 57 runs		2-6 Jun; Match drawn		14-18 Jul; Worcestershire; 140 runs	30 Jun-4 Jul; Kent; 175 runs
Lancashire	14-18 Jul; Derbyshire; 3 wickets				18-22 Aug; Gloucestershire; 2 wickets	16-20 Jun; Lancashire; 263 runs			15-19 Sep; Match drawn	21-23 Jul; Lancashire; 361 runs			26–30 May; Lancashire inns & 88 runs	5–9 May; Surrey; 10 wickets			30 Aug-2 Sep; Worcestershire inns & 13 runs	
Leicestershire			30 Jun-2 Jul; Leicestershire inns & 49 runs			8-12 Sep; Leicestershire; 7 wickets	26–30 May; Leicestershire; 139 runs			16-20 Jun; Middlesex; 10 wickets	28-30 Apr; Leicestershire; 10 wickets		12–16 May; Leicestershire; 5 wickets		18-19 Aug; Sussex; 9 wickets		11-15 Aug; Leicestershire; 97 runs	
Middlesex		23-25 Jun; Middlesex inns & 34 runs	28 Jul-1 Aug; Match drawn	4-8 Aug; Middlesex; 80 runs	8-10 Sep; Middlesex inns & 63 runs								11-15 Aug; Middlesex inns & 30 runs			26–30 May; Match drawn	2-6 Jun; Match drawn	5–9 May; Match drawn
Northamptonshire	21-23 Jul; Northamptonshire; 10 wickets			5–9 May; Match drawn			25-27 Aug; Northamptonshire; 8 wickets	2-6 Jun; Match drawn		18-22 Aug; Northamptonshire; 6 wickets					4-6 Aug; Sussex; 217 runs	23-27 Jun; Warwickshire; 4 wickets		16-20 Jun; Northamptonshire; 160 runs
Nottinghamshire		12–14 May; Nottinghamshire; 8 wickets		30 Aug-2 Sep; Nottinghamshire inns & 37 runs	16-18 Jun; Gloucestershire; 3 wickets			25-29 Aug; Lancashire inns & 148 runs	4-8 Aug; Nottinghamshire; 6 wickets	15-19 Sep; Match drawn	30 Jun-4 Jul; Match drawn			21-23 Jul; Surrey inns & 231 runs	19–23 May; Match drawn			
Somerset	15-19 Sep; Match drawn	4-5 Aug; Somerset; 9 wickets	18-20 Aug; Somerset; 136 runs			2-6 Jun; Somerset; 87 runs					30 Aug-2 Sep; Northamptonshire; 2 wickets	14-18 Jul; Somerset; 111 runs		16-20 Jun; Somerset; 317 runs		19–23 May; Warwickshire; 6 wickets	30 Jun-4 Jul; Somerset; 53 runs	
Surrey	12–16 May; Surrey inns & 138 runs						15-19 Sep; Match drawn		23-25 Jun; Surrey inns & 50 runs	25-29 Aug; Middlesex; 2 wickets	19–23 May; Northamptonshire; 3 wickets				28-30 Jul; Sussex inns & 24 runs	14-18 Jul; Warwickshire; 256 runs	28 Apr-1 May; Surrey; 9 wickets	
Sussex	11-15 Aug; Derbyshire; 1 wicket	16-18 Jun; Sussex; 8 wickets		26–30 May; Match drawn		12–16 May; Sussex; 2 wickets		9-13 Jun; Sussex; 60 runs		14-16 Jul; Sussex; 148 runs			21-25 Jul; Somerset; 68 runs			25-27 Aug; Warwickshire; 10 wickets		15-19 Sep; Match drawn
Warwickshire		2-6 Jun; Match drawn	21-23 Jul; Warwickshire; 203 runs	28 Apr-1 May; Warwickshire inns & 103 runs		30 Aug-2 Sep; Warwickshire inns & 95 runs	16-20 Jun; Warwickshire; 76 runs	30 Jun-4 Jul; Warwickshire; 6 wickets	5–9 May; Match drawn			11-15 Aug; Nottinghamshire inns & 43 runs						
Worcestershire		15-19 Sep; Match drawn	9-13 Jun; Essex; 4 wickets		12–16 May; Match drawn	21-25 Jul; Hampshire; 56 runs					26–30 May; Match drawn	18-22 Aug; Worcestershire; 5 wickets			23-27 Jun; Worcestershire; 1 wicket	4-8 Aug; Match drawn		25-29 Aug; Yorkshire inns & 61 runs
Yorkshire	30 Aug-2 Sep; Yorkshire; 184 runs		19–23 May; Match drawn			23-27 Jun; Match drawn		11-15 Aug; Lancashire; 7 wickets	14-18 Jul; Yorkshire; 114 runs			2-4 Jun; Nottinghamshire; 5 wickets	9-13 Jun; Match drawn	8-12 Sep; Match drawn		18-22 Aug; Warwickshire; 8 wickets		

Home team won	Visiting team won	Match drawn

== Records ==
=== Batting ===
Most runs
Aggregate	Average	Player	County
2,066	89.82	Brian Lara	Warwickshire
1,579	54.44	Carl Hooper	Kent
1,395	55.80	Roger Twose	Warwickshire
1,389	60.39	Mike Gatting	Middlesex
1,369	45.63	John Morris	Durham
1,343	83.93	Graham Gooch	Essex

=== Bowling ===
Most wickets
Aggregate	Average	Player	County
89	17.24	Courtney Walsh	Gloucestershire
81	21.54	Tim Munton	Warwickshire
79	24.17	Min Patel	Kent
77	14.45	Curtly Ambrose	Northamptonshire
76	20.76	Joey Benjamin	Surrey
68	25.82	David Millns	Leicestershire
