= 1956 County Championship =

English cricket tournament

- Cricket format: First-class cricket
- Tournament format: League system
- Champions: Surrey (12th title)
- Participants: 17
- Matches: 238
- Most runs: Peter Wight, (Somerset); 2,086
- Most wickets: Les Jackson, (Derbyshire); 103

The 1956 County Championship was the 57th officially organised running of the County Championship. Surrey won the Championship title for the fifth successive year.

== Table ==
- 12 points for a win
- 6 points to team still batting in the fourth innings of a match in which scores finish level
- 4 points for first innings lead in a lost or drawn match
- 2 points for tie on first innings in a lost or drawn match
- If no play possible on the first two days, the match played to one-day laws with 8 points for a win.

| | Team | P | W | L | D | No Dec | 1st Inns Lead | 1st Inns Tie | Pts |
|---|---|---|---|---|---|---|---|---|---|
| 1 | Surrey | 28 | 15 | 5 | 6 | 2 | 5 | 0 | 200 |
| 2 | Lancashire | 28 | 12 | 2 | 12 | 2 | 9 | 0 | 180 |
| 3 | Gloucestershire | 28 | 14 | 7 | 5 | 2 | 2 | 0 | 176 |
| 4 | Northamptonshire | 28 | 8 | 5 | 15 | 0 | 13 | 0 | 148 |
| 5 | Middlesex | 28 | 11 | 9 | 7 | 1 | 3 | 0 | 144 |
| 6 | Hampshire | 28 | 9 | 6 | 10 | 3 | 8 | 0 | 140 |
| 7 | Yorkshire | 28 | 8 | 7 | 10 | 3 | 10 | 0 | 136 |
| 8 | Nottinghamshire | 28 | 7 | 4 | 15 (Note: Nottinghamshire were awarded eight points for the draw against Lancashire, which they won under one-day rules.) | 2 | 9 | 0 | 128 |
| =9 | Sussex | 28 | 7 | 10 | 9 | 2 | 7 | 0 | 112 |
| =9 | Worcestershire | 28 | 8 | 4 | 14 | 2 | 4 | 0 | 112 |
| 11 | Essex | 28 | 6 | 10 | 9 | 3 | 9 | 1 | 110 |
| 12 | Derbyshire | 28 | 7 | 6 | 11 | 4 | 4 | 1 | 102 |
| 13 | Glamorgan | 28 | 6 | 9 | 9 | 4 | 7 | 0 | 100 |
| 14 | Warwickshire | 28 | 5 | 11 | 9 | 3 | 5 | 0 | 80 |
| 15 | Somerset | 28 | 4 | 15 | 8 | 1 | 7 | 0 | 76 |
| 16 | Kent | 28 | 4 | 12 | 10 | 2 | 3 | 0 | 60 |
| 17 | Leicestershire | 28 | 3 | 12 | 9 | 4 | 5 | 0 | 56 |
