= 1936 County Championship =

English cricket tournament

- Cricket format: First-class cricket
- Tournament format: League system
- Champions: Derbyshire (1st title)

The 1936 County Championship was the 43rd officially organised running of the County Championship. Derbyshire County Cricket Club won their maiden (and so far the only) championship title.

== Table ==
- A minimum of 24 matches
- 15 points for a win
- 7.5 points to each team in a match where the scores finish level
- 5 points for first-innings lead in a drawn match
- 3 points for first-innings deficit in a drawn match
- 4 points to each team where the first-innings scores are level in a drawn match or where there is no result on first innings or where there is no play.
- Positions decided by a percentage of points won against possible points available
- Matches with the first two days washed out would then be played as one day matches and decided on first innings, with 10 points for the winner and 3 points for the loser.

County Championship table
Team	Pld	W	L	DWF	DLF	NR	Pts	%PC
Derbyshire	28	13	4	5	5	1	239	56.90
Middlesex	26	10	4	8	3	1	203	52.05
Yorkshire	30	10	2	12	4	2	230	51.11
Gloucestershire	30	10	7	4	8	1	203	45.11
Nottinghamshire	28	8	3	9	8	0	189	45.00
Surrey	30	9	7	6	6	2	191	42.44
Somerset	26	9	10	2	3	2	162	41.53
Kent	28	9	9	4	5	1	174	41.42
Essex	26	8	8	5	5	0	160	41.02
Hampshire	30	7	5	9	9	0	177	39.33
Lancashire	30	7	6	7	5	5	175	38.88
Worcestershire	28	7	9	4	7	1	150	35.71
Warwickshire	24	4	8	2	7	3	103	28.61
Sussex	30	4	10	7	6	3	125	27.77
Leicestershire	24	2	5	8	8	1	98	27.22
Glamorgan	26	1	12	6	5	2	68	17.43
Northamptonshire	24	0	9	5	9	1	61	16.94
