= 1934 County Championship =

English cricket tournament

- Cricket format: First-class cricket
- Tournament format: League system
- Champions: Lancashire (7th title)

The 1934 County Championship was the 41st officially organised running of the County Championship. Lancashire County Cricket Club won the championship title.

== Table ==
- A minimum of 24 matches
- 15 points for a win
- 7.5 points to each team in a match where the scores finish level
- 5 points for first-innings lead in a drawn match
- 3 points for first-innings deficit in a drawn match
- 4 points to each team where the first-innings scores are level in a drawn match or where there is no result on first innings or where there is no play.
- Positions decided by a percentage of points won against possible points available
- Matches with the first two days washed out would then be played as one day matches and decided on first innings, with 10 points for the winner and 3 points for the loser.

County Championship table
| Team | Pld | W | L | DWF | DLF | NR | Pts | %PC |
|---|---|---|---|---|---|---|---|---|
| Lancashire | 30 | 13 | 3 | 10 | 4 | 0 | 257 | 57.11 |
| Sussex | 30 | 12 | 2 | 7 | 8 | 1 | 243 | 54.00 |
| Derbyshire | 28 | 12 | 6 | 6 | 3 | 1 | 223 | 53.09 |
| Warwickshire | 24 | 10 | 4 | 4 | 4 | 2 | 190 | 52.77 |
| Kent | 30 | 12 | 7 | 6 | 5 | 0 | 225 | 50.00 |
| Yorkshire | 30 | 12 | 7 | 5 | 4 | 2 | 225 | 50.00 |
| Gloucestershire | 30 | 12 | 10 | 2 | 4 | 2 | 210 | 46.66 |
| Essex | 28 | 9 | 4 | 5 | 9 | 1 | 191 | 45.47 |
| Nottinghamshire | 28 | 8 | 7 | 7 | 6 | 0 | 173 | 41.19 |
| Middlesex | 28 | 8 | 9 | 7 | 2 | 2 | 169 | 40.23 |
| Surrey | 26 | 6 | 8 | 9 | 3 | 0 | 144 | 36.92 |
| Leicestershire | 24 | 6 | 9 | 3 | 6 | 0 | 123 | 34.16 |
| Glamorgan | 24 | 3 | 8 | 5 | 5 | 3 | 97 | 26.94 |
| Hampshire | 28 | 3 | 11 | 8 | 5 | 1 | 104 | 24.76 |
| Somerset | 24 | 3 | 10 | 0 | 11 | 0 | 78 | 21.66 |
| Worcestershire | 28 | 3 | 12 | 3 | 9 | 1 | 91 | 21.66 |
| Northamptonshire | 24 | 2 | 17 | 3 | 2 | 0 | 51 | 14.16 |
