= 1958 County Championship =

English cricket tournament

- Cricket format: First-class cricket
- Tournament format: League system
- Champions: Surrey (14th title)
- Participants: 17
- Matches: 238
- Most runs: Martin Young, (Gloucestershire); 1,755
- Most wickets: Derek Shackleton, (Hampshire); 161

The 1958 County Championship was the 59th officially organised running of the County Championship. Surrey won the Championship title for the seventh successive year.

== Table ==
- 12 points for a win
- 6 points to team still batting in the fourth innings of a match in which scores finish level
- 2 points for first innings lead
- 2 bonus points for team leading on first innings if they also score faster on runs per over in first innings
- If no play possible on the first two days, and the match does not go into the second innings, the team leading on first innings scores 8 points.

	Team	P	W	L	D	No Dec	1st Inns Lead	1st Inns Tie	Bonus	Pts
1	Surrey	28	14	5	8	1	6	0	32	212
2	Hampshire	28	12	6	10	0	7	0	28	186
3	Somerset	28	12	9	7	0	5	0	20	174
4	Northamptonshire	28	11	6	6	5	5	0	18	160
5	Derbyshire	28	9	9	8	2	9	1	24	151
6	Essex	28	9	7	7	5	7	0	24	146
7	Lancashire	28	9	7	8	4	8	0	18	142
8	Kent	28	9	10	7	2	5	1	20	139
9	Worcestershire	28	9	7	8	4	3	0	20	134
10	Middlesex	28	7	4	16 (Note: Middlesex were awarded eight points for the draw against Essex, which they won under one-day rules.)	1	10	0	18	130
11	Yorkshire	28	7	5	10 (Note: Yorkshire were awarded eight points for the draws against Hampshire and Nottinghamshire, which they won under one-day rules.)	6	6	0	14	126
12	Leicestershire	28	7	13	6	2	4	0	12	104
13	Sussex	28	6	7	11	4	6	0	18	102
14	Gloucestershire	28	5	9	11	3	7	1	14	89
15	Glamorgan	28	5	11	11	1	6	0	10	82
16	Warwickshire	28	3	7	14	4	8	0	16	68
17	Nottinghamshire	28	3	15	8	2	5	0	4	50
