= 1966 County Championship =

English cricket tournament

- Dates: 4 May – 3 September 1966
- Administrator: England and Wales Cricket Board
- Cricket format: First-class cricket
- Tournament format: League system
- Champions: Yorkshire (27th title)
- Participants: 17
- Matches: 238
- Most runs: Tony Lewis, (Glamorgan); 1,960
- Most wickets: Derek Underwood, (Kent); 143

The 1966 County Championship was the 67th officially organised running of the County Championship. Yorkshire won the Championship title.

The method of obtaining points for the first innings was changed with two points awarded for a first innings lead for any match won, lost or drawn.

== Table ==
- 10 points for a win
- 5 points to each team for a tie
- 5 points to team still batting in a match in which scores finish level
- 2 points for first innings lead
- 1 point for first innings tie
- If no play possible on the first two days, and the match does not go into the second innings, the team leading on first innings scores 6 points. If the scores are level, the team batting second scores 3 points.
- Position determined by points gained. If equal, then decided on most wins.
- Each team plays 28 matches.
- The first innings in the first 102 matches of the season (first 12 games played by each county on a home and away basis) was restricted to 65 overs. Normal conditions applied to return matches or when teams met only once in the season.

	Team	P	W	L	D	No Dec	1st Inns Lead	1st Inns Tie	Pts
1	Yorkshire	28	15	5	8	0	17	0	184
2	Worcestershire	28	13	5	9	1	18	0	166
3	Somerset	28	13	7	7	1	13	0	156
4	Kent	28	11	8	8	1	17	0	144
5	Northamptonshire	28	10	9	9	0	15	0	130
6	Warwickshire	28	8	8	10	2	16	1	113
7	Surrey	28	8	3	16	1	15	0	110
8	Leicestershire	28	8	7	12	1	14	0	108
9	Derbyshire	28	8	12	7	1	8	0	96
10	Sussex	28	6	11	11	0	16	0	92
11	Hampshire	28	5	4	18 (Note: Hampshire were awarded 5 points for the draw against Nottinghamshire, as they were batting fourth when scores were tied.)	1	15	0	87
=12	Lancashire	28	6	11	8	3	13	0	86
=12	Middlesex	28	6	5	14	3	13	0	86
14	Glamorgan	28	6	8	13 (Note: Glamorgan were awarded 5 points for the draw against Essex, as they were batting fourth when scores were tied.)	1	10	0	85
15	Gloucestershire	28	6	12	9	1	7	1	75
16	Essex	28	4	10	11	3	10	0	60
17	Nottinghamshire	28	3	11	12	2	8	0	46
