= List of official County Championship winners =

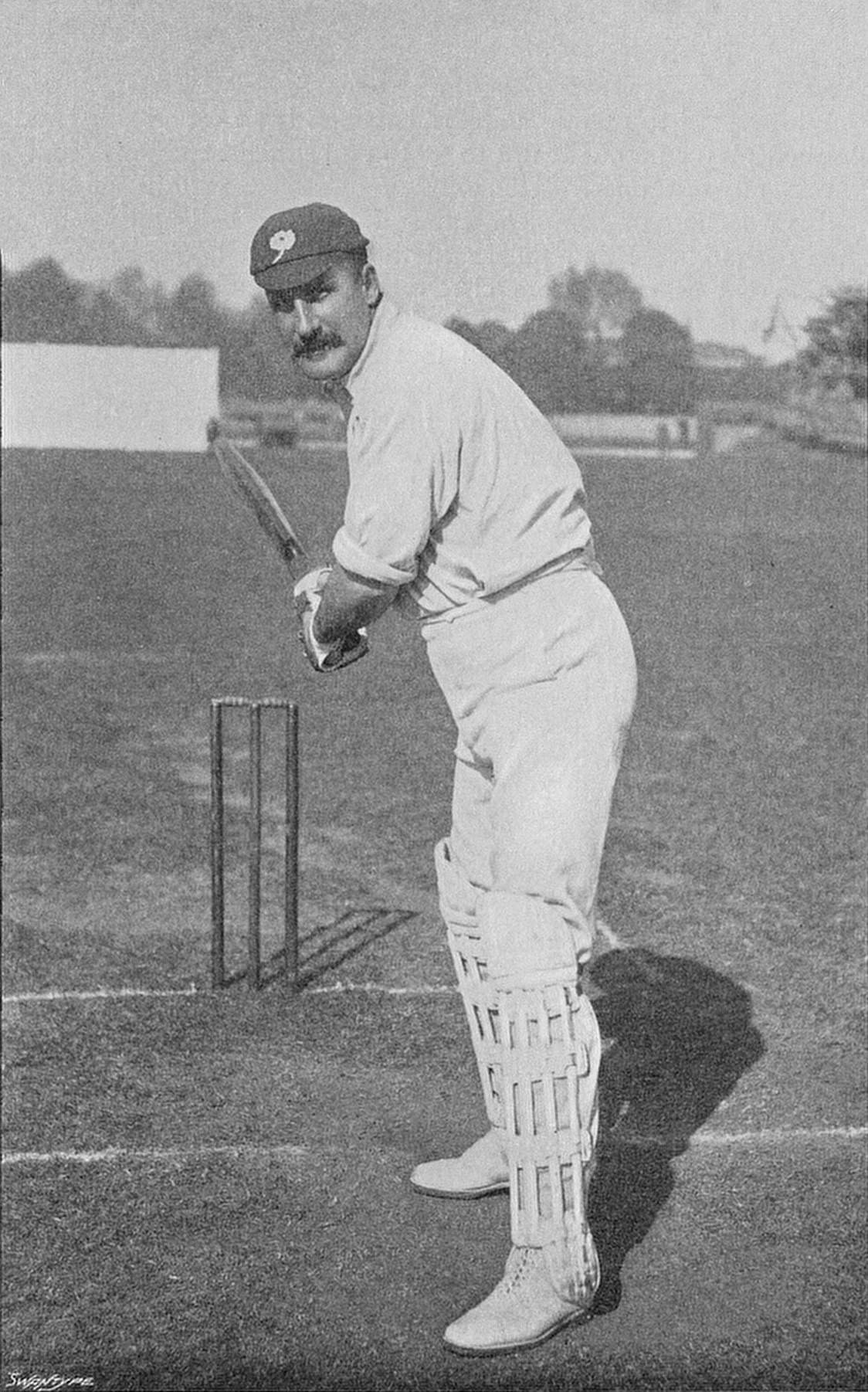
Lord Hawke captained Yorkshire to eight of their record thirty-two Championship titles.

The County Championship is an annual first-class cricket league competition for county cricket clubs in England and Wales. The league is contested on a round-robin basis and the championship awarded to the team that is top of the league at the end of the season. Warwickshire County Cricket Club are the current champions, claiming the title in the 2026 season.

The first references to county cricket come during the early 18th century, during which time cricket was played almost exclusively in the south-east of England, with teams representing Kent, Middlesex, London and Surrey frequently playing each other. The sport soon became popular through the rest of the country, and by the end of the 18th century, the game was being played nationwide. In 1744, Kent faced "All England" and became the first notional English cricket champions, winning by one wicket. Cricket was played at both club and county level equally through the next hundred years, and it was only in the 1870s that county cricket started to be played frequently and regularly: in 1870 there were 22 regular fixtures, while ten years later there were 188.

The title of "Champion County" was awarded intermittently and unreliably from 1826, with no team other than Kent, Surrey or Sussex being named champions until 1852. Qualification rules were introduced in 1873, and for a long time this was considered the start of the County Championship, but the "Champion County" continued to be inconsistently awarded as late as 1886, when Cricket Magazine named Surrey champions, while most other publications agreed upon Nottinghamshire. After a meeting of the principal clubs' secretaries in 1889, a method of ranking the teams was agreed upon, and the 1890 season is considered the first official competing of the County Championship. The inaugural winners of the competition were Surrey, who won nine of their fourteen matches. The championship grew rapidly in its infancy, and had doubled to have 16 member clubs by 1905. Glamorgan joined in 1921, becoming the only non-English county to compete, and Durham became the most recent addition, entering in 1992.

Surrey and Yorkshire each won six of the first thirteen championships, but thereafter the champions diversified, with all but two of the founding member clubs winning by the outbreak of World War I. Yorkshire dominated the competition between the wars, winning in 12 of the 21 seasons. Long periods of dominance continued after World War II: Surrey were champions seven years running during the 1950s, and Yorkshire then won seven of the following ten championships. Since then no county has managed to achieve the same level of ascendancy. In 2000, the competition was split into two divisions, with the winner of Division One being named as County Champions, a decision endorsed by Wisden Cricketers' Almanack editor Graeme Wright, due to there being "fewer meaningless matches".

Yorkshire hold the record for most championships, with 32, plus a shared win in 1949. The next most successful teams are the two London clubs, Surrey and Middlesex, with 22 (plus one shared) and 11 (plus two shared) titles respectively.

Because of the COVID-19 pandemic, the competition was not held in 2020. Essex won the substitute first-class competition, the Bob Willis Trophy.

For 2021, the new structure of three groups of six county teams was retained for the 2021 County Championship, and the Bob Willis Trophy was contested again as a five-day final between the top two teams in County Championship Division One. Warwickshire and Lancashire finished first and second of County Championship Division One respectively, to play for the Bob Willis Trophy at Lord's with Warwickshire winning the match to become the second winners of the Bob Willis Trophy.

== Champions ==
List of County Championship winners
Year	Winner (number of titles)	Runners-up	Leading run-scorer		Leading wicket-taker		Notes
Year	Winner (number of titles)	Runners-up	Player (club)	Runs	Player (club)	Wickets	Notes
1890	Surrey (1)	Lancashire	Arthur Shrewsbury (Nottinghamshire)	1,082	George Lohmann (Surrey)	113	
1891	Surrey (2)	Lancashire	Bobby Abel (Surrey)	916	George Lohmann (Surrey)	132	
1892	Surrey (3)	Nottinghamshire	Herbie Hewett (Somerset)	1,047	William Lockwood (Surrey)	114	
1893	Yorkshire (1)	Lancashire	Billy Gunn (Nottinghamshire)	1,223	Jack Hearne (Middlesex)	137	
1894	Surrey (4)	Yorkshire	Billy Gunn (Nottinghamshire)	851	Arthur Mold (Lancashire)	144	
1895	Surrey (5)	Lancashire	Bobby Abel (Surrey)	1,787	Tom Richardson (Surrey)	239	
1896	Yorkshire (2)	Lancashire	K. S. Ranjitsinhji (Sussex)	1,698	Tom Richardson (Surrey)	191	
1897	Lancashire (1)	Surrey	Bobby Abel (Surrey)	1,833	Tom Richardson (Surrey)	238	
1898	Yorkshire (3)	Middlesex	Bobby Abel (Surrey)	1,832	Charlie Townsend (Gloucestershire)	130	
1899	Surrey (6)	Middlesex	K. S. Ranjitsinhji (Sussex)	2,285	Albert Trott (Middlesex)	146	
1900	Yorkshire (4)	Lancashire	K. S. Ranjitsinhji (Sussex)	2,563	Wilfred Rhodes (Yorkshire)	206	
1901	Yorkshire (5)	Middlesex	Johnny Tyldesley (Lancashire)	2,605	Wilfred Rhodes (Yorkshire)	196	
1902	Yorkshire (6)	Sussex	Bobby Abel (Surrey)	1,570	Fred Tate (Sussex)	153	
1903	Middlesex (1)	Sussex	C. B. Fry (Sussex)	2,413	Wilfred Rhodes (Yorkshire)	143	
1904	Lancashire (2)	Yorkshire	C. B. Fry (Sussex)	2,376	George Dennett (Gloucestershire)	123	
1905	Yorkshire (7)	Lancashire	David Denton (Yorkshire)	1,963	Walter Lees (Surrey)	169	
1906	Kent (1)	Yorkshire	Tom Hayward (Surrey)	2,814	George Hirst (Yorkshire)	182	
1907	Nottinghamshire (1)	Worcestershire, Yorkshire	Ernie Hayes (Surrey)	1,721	George Dennett (Gloucestershire)	184	
1908	Yorkshire (8)	Kent	Tom Hayward (Surrey)	1,874	Colin Blythe (Kent)	167	
1909	Kent (2)	Lancashire	Ernie Hayes (Surrey)	1,844	Colin Blythe (Kent)	178	
1910	Kent (3)	Surrey	Johnny Tyldesley (Lancashire)	1,961	Razor Smith (Surrey)	215	
1911	Warwickshire (1)	Kent	Tom Hayward (Surrey)	1,963	Harry Dean (Lancashire)	175	
1912	Yorkshire (9)	Northamptonshire	David Denton (Yorkshire)	1,831	Colin Blythe (Kent)	170	
1913	Kent (4)	Yorkshire	Jack Hobbs (Surrey)	2,238	Major Booth (Yorkshire)	158	
1914	Surrey (7)	Middlesex	Jack Hobbs (Surrey)	2,499	Colin Blythe (Kent)	159	
1915–1918	Not held due to World War I						
1919	Yorkshire (10)	Kent	Harry Makepeace (Lancashire)	1,747	Wilfred Rhodes (Yorkshire)	142	
1920	Middlesex (2)	Lancashire	Percy Holmes (Yorkshire)	2,029	Frank Woolley (Kent), Alec Kennedy (Hampshire)	164	
1921	Middlesex (3)	Surrey	Phil Mead (Hampshire)	2,438	Jack Newman (Hampshire)	172	
1922	Yorkshire (11)	Nottinghamshire	Phil Mead (Hampshire)	2,270	Charlie Parker (Gloucestershire)	195	
1923	Yorkshire (12)	Nottinghamshire	Phil Mead (Hampshire)	2,265	Cec Parkin (Lancashire)	176	
1924	Yorkshire (13)	Middlesex	Dodger Whysall (Nottinghamshire)	1,786	Charlie Parker (Gloucestershire)	184	
1925	Yorkshire (14)	Surrey	Percy Holmes (Yorkshire)	2,123	Charlie Parker (Gloucestershire)	200	
1926	Lancashire (3)	Yorkshire	Ernest Tyldesley (Lancashire)	2,365	Charlie Parker (Gloucestershire)	198	
1927	Lancashire (4)	Nottinghamshire	Wally Hammond (Gloucestershire)	2,522	Charlie Parker (Gloucestershire)	183	
1928	Lancashire (5)	Kent	Phil Mead (Hampshire)	2,843	Tich Freeman (Kent)	216	
1929	Nottinghamshire (2)	Lancashire, Yorkshire	Alfred Dipper (Gloucestershire), Dodger Whysall (Nottinghamshire)	2,079	Tich Freeman (Kent)	199	
1930	Lancashire (6)	Gloucestershire	Andy Sandham (Surrey)	1,884	Tich Freeman (Kent)	249	
1931	Yorkshire (15)	Gloucestershire	Patsy Hendren (Middlesex)	2,122	Tich Freeman (Kent)	241	
1932	Yorkshire (16)	Sussex	Herbert Sutcliffe (Yorkshire)	2,624	Tich Freeman (Kent)	209	
1933	Yorkshire (17)	Sussex	Wally Hammond (Gloucestershire)	2,578	Tich Freeman (Kent)	252	
1934	Lancashire (7)	Sussex	Harold Gibbons (Worcestershire)	2,452	Tich Freeman (Kent)	187	
1935	Yorkshire (18)	Derbyshire	Frank Woolley (Kent)	2,187	Tich Freeman (Kent)	201	
1936	Derbyshire (1)	Middlesex	Patsy Hendren (Middlesex)	1,963	Alf Gover (Surrey)	171	
1937	Yorkshire (19)	Middlesex	Jim Parks, Sr. (Sussex)	2,578	Tom Goddard (Gloucestershire)	215	
1938	Yorkshire (20)	Middlesex	John Langridge (Sussex)	2,302	Arthur Wellard (Somerset)	167	
1939	Yorkshire (21)	Middlesex	Len Hutton (Yorkshire)	2,167	Tom Goddard (Gloucestershire)	181	
1940–1945	Not held due to World War II						
1946	Yorkshire (22)	Middlesex	Laurie Fishlock (Surrey)	1,963	Eric Hollies (Warwickshire)	175	
1947	Middlesex (4)	Gloucestershire	Bill Edrich (Middlesex)	2,257	Tom Goddard (Gloucestershire)	206	
1948	Glamorgan (1)	Surrey	Arthur Fagg (Kent)	2,404	Tom Pritchard (Warwickshire)	163	
1949	Middlesex, Yorkshire (Note: The County Championship title was shared in 1949, 1950 and 1977.)	N/A	John Langridge (Sussex)	2,441	Tom Goddard (Gloucestershire)	152	
1950	Lancashire, Surrey	N/A	Laurie Fishlock (Surrey)	2,077	Roy Tattersall (Lancashire)	163	
1951	Warwickshire (2)	Yorkshire	Jack Robertson (Middlesex)	2,452	Bob Appleyard (Yorkshire)	169	
1952	Surrey (8)	Yorkshire	Harold Gimblett (Somerset)	2,068	Johnny Wardle (Yorkshire)	158	
1953	Surrey (9)	Sussex	Don Kenyon (Worcestershire)	2,063	Bruce Dooland (Nottinghamshire)	152	
1954	Surrey (10)	Yorkshire	Don Kenyon (Worcestershire)	2,138	Bruce Dooland (Nottinghamshire)	179	
1955	Surrey (11)	Yorkshire	Jock Livingston (Northamptonshire)	1,957	George Tribe (Northamptonshire)	169	
1956	Surrey (12)	Lancashire	Jock Livingston (Northamptonshire)	1,846	Don Shepherd (Glamorgan)	156	
1957	Surrey (13)	Northamptonshire	Jim Parks, Jr. (Sussex)	1,861	Tony Lock (Surrey)	153	
1958	Surrey (14)	Hampshire	Martin Young (Gloucestershire)	1,755	Derek Shackleton (Hampshire)	161	
1959	Yorkshire (23)	Gloucestershire	Mike Smith (Warwickshire)	2,169	Derek Shackleton (Hampshire)	126	
1960	Yorkshire (24)	Lancashire	Peter Wight (Somerset)	2,086	Les Jackson (Derbyshire)	146	
1961	Hampshire (1)	Yorkshire	Bill Alley (Somerset)	2,532	Derek Shackleton (Hampshire)	153	
1962	Yorkshire (25)	Worcestershire	Jimmy Gray (Hampshire)	2,196	Derek Shackleton (Hampshire)	161	
1963	Yorkshire (26)	Glamorgan	Peter Richardson (Kent)	1,798	Ken Palmer (Somerset)	121	
1964	Worcestershire (1)	Warwickshire	Tom Graveney (Worcestershire)	2,271	Derek Shackleton (Hampshire)	138	
1965	Worcestershire (2)	Northamptonshire	David Green (Lancashire)	1,784	Derek Shackleton (Hampshire)	133	
1966	Yorkshire (27)	Worcestershire	Tony Lewis (Glamorgan)	1,960	Derek Underwood (Kent)	143	
1967	Yorkshire (28)	Kent	Arthur Milton (Gloucestershire)	1,971	Tom Cartwright (Warwickshire)	132	
1968	Yorkshire (29)	Kent	Barry Richards (Hampshire)	2,039	Bob Cottam (Hampshire)	122	
1969	Glamorgan (2)	Gloucestershire	Brian Luckhurst (Kent)	1,593	Mike Procter (Gloucestershire)	103	
1970	Kent (5)	Glamorgan	Glenn Turner (Worcestershire)	2,346	Don Shepherd (Glamorgan)	101	
1971	Surrey (15)	Warwickshire	Geoffrey Boycott (Yorkshire)	2,197	Lance Gibbs (Warwickshire)	123	
1972	Warwickshire (3)	Kent	Mushtaq Mohammad (Northamptonshire)	1,743	Tom Cartwright (Somerset)	93	
1973	Hampshire (2)	Surrey	Gordon Greenidge (Hampshire)	1,620	Peter Lee (Lancashire)	96	
1974	Worcestershire (3)	Hampshire	Roy Virgin (Northamptonshire)	1,845	Andy Roberts (Hampshire)	111	
1975	Leicestershire (1)	Yorkshire	Geoffrey Boycott (Yorkshire)	1,891	Peter Lee (Lancashire)	107	
1976	Middlesex (5)	Northamptonshire	Zaheer Abbas (Gloucestershire)	2,431	Sarfraz Nawaz (Northamptonshire)	82	
1977	Kent, Middlesex	N/A	Viv Richards (Somerset)	2,090	Mike Procter (Gloucestershire)	108	
1978	Kent (6)	Essex	Dennis Amiss (Warwickshire)	2,001	Derek Underwood (Kent)	110	
1979	Essex (1)	Worcestershire	Glenn Turner (Worcestershire)	1,669	Derek Underwood (Kent)	104	
1980	Middlesex (6)	Surrey	Peter Kirsten (Derbyshire)	1,891	Robin Jackman (Surrey)	114	
1981	Nottinghamshire (3)	Sussex	Zaheer Abbas (Gloucestershire)	2,230	Richard Hadlee (Nottinghamshire)	105	
1982	Middlesex (7)	Leicestershire	Alvin Kallicharran (Warwickshire)	2,118	Malcolm Marshall (Hampshire)	134	
1983	Essex (2)	Middlesex	Ken McEwan (Essex)	2,051	Derek Underwood (Kent)	105	
1984	Essex (3)	Nottinghamshire	Graham Gooch (Essex)	2,281	Richard Hadlee (Nottinghamshire)	117	
1985	Middlesex (8)	Hampshire	Derek Randall (Nottinghamshire)	1,977	Neal Radford (Worcestershire)	100	
1986	Essex (4)	Gloucestershire	Graeme Hick (Worcestershire)	1,934	Courtney Walsh (Gloucestershire)	118	
1987	Nottinghamshire (4)	Lancashire	Graeme Hick (Worcestershire)	1,868	Neal Radford (Worcestershire)	109	
1988	Worcestershire (4)	Kent	Graeme Hick (Worcestershire)	2,443	Franklyn Stephenson (Nottinghamshire)	121	
1989	Worcestershire (5)	Essex	Jimmy Cook (Somerset)	2,173	Franklyn Stephenson (Nottinghamshire)	91	
1990	Middlesex (9)	Essex	Jimmy Cook (Somerset)	2,432	Neil Foster (Essex)	94	
1991	Essex (5)	Warwickshire	Jimmy Cook (Somerset)	2,370	Waqar Younis (Surrey)	113	
1992	Essex (6)	Kent	Mike Gatting (Middlesex)	1,980	Courtney Walsh (Gloucestershire)	92	
1993	Middlesex (10)	Worcestershire	Bill Athey (Sussex)	1,432	Mushtaq Ahmed (Somerset)	85	
1994	Warwickshire (4)	Leicestershire	Brian Lara (Warwickshire)	2,066	Courtney Walsh (Gloucestershire)	89	
1995	Warwickshire (5)	Middlesex	Mark Ramprakash (Middlesex)	2,147	Anil Kumble (Northamptonshire)	105	
1996	Leicestershire (2)	Derbyshire	Graham Gooch (Essex)	1,944	Courtney Walsh (Gloucestershire)	85	
1997	Glamorgan (3)	Kent	Steve James (Glamorgan)	1,605	Mike Smith (Gloucestershire)	78	
1998	Leicestershire (3)	Lancashire	John Crawley (Lancashire)	1,681	Courtney Walsh (Gloucestershire)	106	
1999	Surrey (16)	Lancashire	Stuart Law (Essex)	1,833	Alamgir Sheriyar (Worcestershire)	86	
2000	Surrey (17)	Lancashire	Darren Lehmann (Yorkshire)	1,477	Glenn McGrath (Worcestershire)	76	
2001	Yorkshire (30)	Somerset	Michael Hussey (Northamptonshire)	2,055	James Kirtley (Sussex)	75	
2002	Surrey (18)	Warwickshire	Ian Ward (Surrey)	1,708	Kevin Dean (Derbyshire)	80	
2003	Sussex (1)	Lancashire	Stuart Law (Lancashire)	1,820	Mushtaq Ahmed (Sussex)	103	
2004	Warwickshire (6)	Kent	Brad Hodge (Leicestershire)	1,548	Mushtaq Ahmed (Sussex)	82	
2005	Nottinghamshire (5)	Hampshire	Ed Joyce (Middlesex)	1,668	Mushtaq Ahmed (Sussex)	80	
2006	Sussex (2)	Lancashire	Mark Ramprakash (Surrey)	2,211	Mushtaq Ahmed (Sussex)	102	
2007	Sussex (3)	Durham	Mark Ramprakash (Surrey)	2,026	Mushtaq Ahmed (Sussex)	90	
2008	Durham (1)	Nottinghamshire	Murray Goodwin (Sussex)	1,343	James Tomlinson (Hampshire)	67	
2009	Durham (2)	Nottinghamshire	Marcus Trescothick (Somerset)	1,817	Danish Kaneria (Essex)	75	
2010	Nottinghamshire (6)	Somerset	Mark Ramprakash (Surrey)	1,595	Andre Adams (Nottinghamshire)	68	
2011	Lancashire (8)	Warwickshire	Marcus Trescothick (Somerset)	1,673	David Masters (Essex)	93	
2012	Warwickshire (7)	Somerset	Nick Compton (Somerset)	1,191	Graham Onions (Durham)	64	
2013	Durham (3)	Yorkshire	Moeen Ali (Worcestershire)	1,375	Graham Onions (Durham)	70	
2014	Yorkshire (31)	Warwickshire	James Vince (Hampshire)	1,525	Mark Footitt (Derbyshire)	82	
2015	Yorkshire (32)	Middlesex	Ashwell Prince (Lancashire)	1,478	Chris Rushworth (Durham)	83	
2016	Middlesex (11)	Somerset	Keaton Jennings (Durham)	1,548	Jeetan Patel (Warwickshire)	69	
2017	Essex (7)	Lancashire	Kumar Sangakkara (Surrey)	1,491	Jamie Porter (Essex)	75	
2018	Surrey (19)	Somerset	Rory Burns (Surrey)	1,359	Tom Bailey (Lancashire)	64	
2019	Essex (8)	Somerset	Dominic Sibley (Warwickshire)	1,324	Simon Harmer (Essex)	83	
2020	Not held due to COVID-19						
2021	Warwickshire (8)	Lancashire	Tom Haines (Sussex)	1,176	Luke Fletcher (Nottinghamshire)	66	
2022	Surrey (20)	Lancashire	Keaton Jennings (Lancashire)	1,233	Simon Harmer (Essex)	59	
2023	Surrey (21)	Essex	Josh Bohannon (Lancashire)	1,257	Brett Hutton (Nottinghamshire)	62	
2024	Surrey (22)	Hampshire	David Bedingham (Durham)	1,331	Jamie Porter (Essex)	56	
2025	Nottinghamshire (7)	Surrey	Dom Sibley (Surrey)	1,274	Tom Taylor (Worcestershire)	58	
2026	Warwickshire (9)	Somerset	Joe Clarke (Nottinghamshire)	1,288	Ethan Bamber (Warwickshire)	69	

== Performance by club ==
Titles won by club (%)
1. Yorkshire – 33 (1 shared) (25.8%)
2. Surrey – 23 (1 shared) (17.9%)
3. Middlesex – 13 (2 shared) (10.1%)
4. Warwickshire – 9 (7.00%)
5. Lancashire – 9 (1 shared) (7.00%)
6. Essex – 8 (6.20%)
7. Nottinghamshire – 7 (5.50%)
8. Kent – 7 (1 shared) (5.50%)
9. Other counties – 20 (15.6%)

Club	Titles	Championship-winning seasons
Yorkshire	33 (1 shared)	1893, 1896, 1898, 1900, 1901, 1902, 1905, 1908, 1912, 1919, 1922, 1923, 1924, 1925, 1931, 1932, 1933, 1935, 1937, 1938, 1939, 1946, 1949 (shared), 1959, 1960, 1962, 1963, 1966, 1967, 1968, 2001, 2014, 2015
Surrey	23 (1 shared)	1890, 1891, 1892, 1894, 1895, 1899, 1914, 1950 (shared), 1952, 1953, 1954, 1955, 1956, 1957, 1958, 1971, 1999, 2000, 2002, 2018, 2022, 2023, 2024
Middlesex	13 (2 shared)	1903, 1920, 1921, 1947, 1949 (shared), 1976, 1977 (shared), 1980, 1982, 1985, 1990, 1993, 2016
Warwickshire	9	1911, 1951, 1972, 1994, 1995, 2004, 2012, 2021, 2026
Lancashire	9 (1 shared)	1897, 1904, 1926, 1927, 1928, 193, 1934, 1950 (shared), 2011
Essex	8	1979, 1983, 1984, 1986, 1991, 1992, 2017, 2019
Nottinghamshire	7	1907, 1929, 1981, 1987, 2005, 2010, 2025
Kent	7 (1 shared)	1906, 1909, 1910, 1913, 1970, 1977 (shared), 1978
Worcestershire	5	1964, 1965, 1974, 1988, 1989
Durham	3	2008, 2009, 2013
Glamorgan	3	1948, 1969, 1997
Leicestershire	3	1975, 1996, 1998
Sussex	3	2003, 2006, 2007
Hampshire	2	1961, 1973
Derbyshire	1	1936
Gloucestershire	0	
Northamptonshire	0	
Somerset	0	

== Bibliography ==
- Altham, H.S.; Swanton, E.W. (1938) [1926]. A History of Cricket (Second ed.). London: George Allen & Unwin Ltd.
