= 1933 County Championship =

English cricket tournament

- Cricket format: First-class cricket
- Tournament format: League system
- Champions: Yorkshire (17th title)

The 1933 County Championship was the 40th officially organised running of the County Championship. Yorkshire County Cricket Club won the championship title for the third successive year.

The method for deciding the championship was changed once again as follows:

- A minimum of 24 matches
- 15 points for a win
- 7.5 points to each team in a match where the scores finish level
- 5 points for first-innings lead in a drawn match
- 3 points for first-innings deficit in a drawn match
- 4 points to each team where the first-innings scores are level in a drawn match or where there is no result on first innings or where there is no play.
- Positions decided by a percentage of points won against possible points available
- Matches with the first two days washed out would then be played as one day matches and decided on first innings, with 10 points for the winner and 3 points for the loser.

== Table ==
County Championship table
Team	Pld	W	L	DWF	DLF	NR	Pts	%PC
Yorkshire	30	19	3	3	5	0	315	70.00
Sussex	32	18	5	7	2	0	311	64.79
Kent	30	15	8	3	3	1	253	56.22
Essex	28	13	8	4	3	0	224	53.33
Lancashire	28	9	1	10	7	1	210	50.00
Derbyshire	28	11	11	3	3	0	189	45.00
Warwickshire	28	9	5	5	8	1	188	44.76
Nottinghamshire	28	7	3	7	8	3	176	41.90
Surrey	26	6	5	12	3	0	159	40.76
Gloucestershire	30	10	13	5	2	0	181	40.22
Somerset	26	6	10	2	5	3	127	32.56
Middlesex	26	7	14	2	2	1	125	32.05
Northamptonshire	24	5	11	5	3	0	109	30.27
Hampshire	28	2	9	4	11	2	91	21.66
Worcestershire	30	2	13	7	6	2	91	20.22
Glamorgan	24	1	9	5	7	2	69	19.16
Leicestershire	26	3	15	1	7	0	71	18.20
