= 1924 County Championship =

English cricket tournament

- Cricket format: First-class cricket
- Tournament format: League system
- Champions: Yorkshire (13th title)
- Participants: 17

The 1924 County Championship was the 31st officially organised running of the County Championship. Yorkshire County Cricket Club won the championship title for the third successive year.

Final placings were still decided by calculating the percentage of points gained against possible points available but the points for a win on first innings drawn matches reverted to three points and in a match lost to one point. The matches Warwicks vs Notts, Surrey vs Essex, Leics vs Surrey, Somerset vs Essex and Glamorgan vs Somerset were all abandoned without a ball being bowled.

== Table ==
- Five points were awarded for a win.
- Three points were awarded for "winning" the first innings of a drawn match.
- Two points were awarded for "tying" the first innings of a drawn match.
- One point was awarded for "losing" the first innings of a drawn match.
- Final placings were decided by calculating the percentage of possible points.

County Championship table
Team	Pld	W	L	DWF	DLF	T	NR	Pts	%PC
Yorkshire	30	16	3	2	2	0	7	88	76.52
Middlesex	22	11	3	4	2	0	2	69	69.00
Surrey	24	9	1	6	4	0	4	67	67.00
Lancashire	30	11	2	6	6	0	5	79	63.20
Kent	28	12	4	5	4	1	2	81	62.30
Gloucestershire	26	9	7	6	1	0	3	64	55.65
Nottinghamshire	27	9	3	4	7	0	4	64	55.65
Somerset	22	9	7	1	2	1	2	52	52.00
Warwickshire	25	7	6	2	5	0	5	46	46.00
Sussex	26	7	12	5	1	0	1	51	40.80
Leicestershire	25	7	12	4	2	0	0	49	39.20
Hampshire	28	5	9	4	6	0	4	43	35.83
Glamorgan	21	5	11	3	1	0	1	35	35.00
Worcestershire	24	4	11	3	5	0	1	34	29.56
Essex	26	2	12	4	5	0	3	27	23.47
Northamptonshire	22	2	9	0	6	0	5	16	18.82
Derbyshire	22	0	13	4	4	0	3	16	15.23
