= 1954 County Championship =

English cricket tournament

- Cricket format: First-class cricket
- Tournament format: League system
- Champions: Surrey (10th title)
- Participants: 17
- Matches: 238
- Most runs: Don Kenyon, (Sussex); 2,138
- Most wickets: Bruce Dooland, (Nottinghamshire); 179

The 1954 County Championship was the 55th officially organised running of the County Championship. Surrey won the Championship title for the third successive year.

== Table ==
- 12 points for a win
- 6 points to team still batting in the fourth innings of a match in which scores finish level
- 4 points for first innings lead in a lost or drawn match
- 2 points for tie on first innings in a lost or drawn match
- If no play possible on the first two days, the match played to one-day laws with 8 points for a win.

	Team	P	W	L	D	T	No Dec	1st Inns Lead	1st Inns Tie	Pts
1	Surrey	28	15	3	8	0	2	7	0	208
2	Yorkshire	28	13	3	8 (Note: Yorkshire were awarded eight points for the draw against Somerset, which they won under one-day rules.)	1	3	4	1	186
3	Derbyshire	28	11	6	9	0	2	9	0	168
4	Glamorgan	28	11	5	10	0	2	4	0	148
5	Nottinghamshire	28	10	6	8	0	4	6	0	144
6	Warwickshire	28	10	5	10	0	3	5	0	140
=7	Middlesex	28	10	5	10	0	3	4	0	136
=7	Northamptonshire	28	9	9	9	0	1	7	0	136
9	Sussex	28	8	7	12	0	1	6	0	120
10	Lancashire	28	6	3	12	0	7	9	0	108
=11	Kent	28	5	7	15	0	1	10	0	100
=11	Worcestershire	28	5	12	9 (Note: Worcestershire were awarded eight points for the draw against Northants, which they won under one-day rules.)	0	2	8	1	100
13	Gloucestershire	28	5	11	10	0	2	9	0	96
14	Hampshire	28	4	10	13	0	1	8	0	80
15	Essex	28	3	11	12	0	2	7	0	64
16	Leicestershire	28	3	9	11	1	4	5	0	62
17	Somerset	28	2	18	8	0	0	4	0	40
