= 1937 County Championship =

English cricket tournament

- Cricket format: First-class cricket
- Tournament format: League system
- Champions: Yorkshire (19th title)

The 1937 County Championship was the 44th officially organised running of the County Championship. Yorkshire County Cricket Club won their 19th championship title.

== Table ==
- A minimum of 24 matches
- 15 points for a win
- 7.5 points to each team in a match where the scores finish level
- 5 points for first-innings lead in a drawn match
- 3 points for first-innings deficit in a drawn match
- 4 points to each team where the first-innings scores are level in a drawn match or where there is no result on first innings or where there is no play.
- Positions decided by a percentage of points won against possible points available
- Matches with the first two days washed out would then be played as one day matches and decided on first innings, with 10 points for the winner and 3 points for the loser.

County Championship table
Team	Pld	W	L	DWF	DLF	NR	Pts	%PC
Yorkshire	28	18	2	4	4	0	302	71.90
Middlesex	24	15	4	3	2	0	246	68.33
Derbyshire	28	14	6	2	4	2	240	57.14
Gloucestershire	30	15	10	2	3	0	244	54.22
Sussex	32	13	7	8	4	0	247	51.45
Essex	28	13	11	2	1	1	212	50.47
Glamorgan	28	11	7	4	6	0	203	48.33
Surrey	26	8	5	7	4	2	175	44.87
Lancashire	32	9	5	12	6	0	213	44.37
Nottinghamshire	28	6	4	8	8	2	162	38.57
Warwickshire	24	6	8	6	4	0	132	36.66
Kent	28	8	16	2	2	0	136	32.38
Somerset	28	7	14	2	5	0	130	30.95
Hampshire	28	7	16	4	1	0	128	30.47
Worcestershire	30	8	17	0	5	0	135	30.00
Leicestershire	26	1	11	3	11	0	63	16.15
Northamptonshire	24	0	16	4	3	1	33	9.16
