= 2000 County Championship =

English cricket tournament

- Dates: 26 April – 16 September 2000
- Administrator: England and Wales Cricket Board
- Cricket format: First-class cricket
- Tournament format: League system
- Champions: Division 1 - Surrey (17th title)
- Participants: 18
- Matches: 144
- Most runs: Darren Lehmann, (Yorkshire); 1,447
- Most wickets: Glenn McGrath, (Worcestershire); 76

The 2000 PPP Healthcare County Championship was the 101st officially organised running of the Championship. Surrey won Division One with Northamptonshire winning the second division.

It was the first time that the championship was held with two divisions with a promotion and relegation format in place.

== Tables ==
- 12 points for a win
- 4 points for a draw
- Batting 200 runs, 1 point, 250 runs, 2 points, 300 runs, 3 points, 350 runs, 4 points, 400 runs, 5 points.
- Bowling 3 wickets, 1 point, six wickets, 2 points, nine wickets, 3 points.

=== Division One ===
County Championship table
	Team	P	W	L	D	Bat	Bowl	Pts
1	Surrey	16	9	2	5	44	41	213
2	Lancashire	16	7	1	8	35	42	193
3	Yorkshire	16	7	2	7	36	48	188
4	Leicestershire	16	4	3	9	42	39	165
5	Somerset	16	2	4	10	41	40	145
6	Kent	16	4	4	8	18	42	140
7	Hampshire	16	3	9	4	20	48	120
8	Durham	16	2	9	5	27	41	112
9	Derbyshire *	16	2	6	8	19	44	111

= Champions
= Relegated

- 8 points deducted

=== Division Two ===
County Championship table
	Team	P	W	L	D	Bat	Bowl	Pts
1	Northamptonshire	16	7	4	5	39	45	188
2	Essex	16	5	2	9	28	41	165
3	Glamorgan	16	5	3	8	27	41	160
4	Gloucestershire	16	6	4	6	20	42	158
5	Worcestershire	16	5	5	6	25	42	151
6	Warwickshire	16	2	3	11	47	35	150
7	Nottinghamshire	16	2	4	10	41	43	148
8	Middlesex	16	2	6	8	36	46	138
9	Sussex	16	3	6	7	31	39	134

= Champions
= Promoted
