= 1998 County Championship =

English cricket tournament

- Dates: 17 April – 20 September 1998
- Administrator: England and Wales Cricket Board
- Cricket format: First-class cricket
- Tournament format: League system
- Champions: Leicestershire (3rd title)
- Participants: 18
- Matches: 153
- Most runs: John Crawley, (Lancashire); 1,681
- Most wickets: Courtney Walsh, (Gloucestershire); 106

The 1998 Britannic Assurance County Championship was the 99th officially organised running of the County Championship. Leicestershire won the title, and were the first undefeated Champion since Hampshire in 1973.

The Championship was sponsored by Britannic Assurance for the fifteenth and last time.

== Table ==
- 16 points for a win
- 8 points to each team for a tie
- 8 points to team still batting in a match in which scores finish level
- 3 points for a draw
- Bonus points awarded in first 120 overs of first innings
  - Batting:
    - 200 runs – 1 point
    - 250 runs – 2 points
    - 300 runs – 3 points
    - 350 runs – 4 points
  - Bowling:
    - 3 or 4 wickets – 1 point,
    - 5 or 6 wickets – 2 points
    - 7 or 8 wickets – 3 points
    - 9 or 10 wickets – 4 points
- No bonus points awarded in a match starting with less than 8 hours' play remaining. A one-innings match is played, with the winner gaining 12 points.
- Position determined by points gained.
  - If equal, then decided by the following tiebreakers in order:
1. Most wins
2. Fewest losses
3. Most points in head-to-head contests
4. Most wickets taken over whole season
5. Most runs scored over whole season

| | Team | P | W | L | D | Bat | Bowl | Pts |
|---|---|---|---|---|---|---|---|---|
| 1 | Leicestershire | 17 | 11 | 0 | 6 | 47 | 51 | 292 |
| 2 | Lancashire | 17 | 11 | 1 | 5 | 30 | 56 | 277 |
| 3 | Yorkshire | 17 | 9 | 3 | 5 | 47 | 63 | 269 |
| 4 | Gloucestershire | 17 | 11 | 5 | 1 | 23 | 65 | 267 |
| 5 | Surrey | 17 | 10 | 5 | 2 | 38 | 57 | 261 |
| 6 | Hampshire | 17 | 6 | 5 | 6 | 27 | 61 | 202 |
| 7 | Sussex | 17 | 6 | 7 | 4 | 30 | 63 | 201 |
| 8 | Warwickshire | 17 | 6 | 8 | 3 | 35 | 60 | 200 |
| 9 | Somerset | 17 | 6 | 7 | 4 | 30 | 54 | 192 |
| 10 | Derbyshire | 17 | 6 | 7 | 4 | 28 | 55 | 191 |
| 11 | Kent | 17 | 5 | 5 | 7 | 18 | 59 | 178 |
| 12 (Note: Glamorgan finished ahead of Worcestershire by virtue of having taken more wickets over the whole season.) | Glamorgan | 17 | 4 | 6 | 7 | 36 | 55 | 176 |
| 13 | Worcestershire | 17 | 4 | 6 | 7 | 32 | 59 | 176 |
| 14 | Durham | 17 | 3 | 9 | 5 | 30 | 65 | 158 |
| 15 | Northamptonshire | 17 | 4 | 5 | 8 | 31 | 52 | 146 (Note: Northamptonshire lost 25 points for preparing a pitch deemed unsuitable for first-class cricket) |
| 16 | Nottinghamshire | 17 | 3 | 10 | 4 | 20 | 60 | 140 |
| 17 | Middlesex | 17 | 2 | 9 | 6 | 28 | 52 | 130 |
| 18 | Essex | 17 | 2 | 11 | 4 | 16 | 58 | 118 |

== Notable events ==
- May 23–24: Northamptonshire's second innings total of 712 against Glamorgan at Northampton was the highest second-innings total in English first-class cricket, surpassing Cambridge University's 703 for 9 against Sussex in 1890.
  - Malachy Loye's 322 during this innings was the highest innings played by any batsman during a second innings in English first-class cricket, surpassing Emrys Davies' 287 for Glamorgan against Gloucestershire in 1939.
- June 21: Andrew Flintoff of Lancashire takes 38 runs (Note: This includes four runs for two no-balls) off an over by Surrey's Alex Tudor, breaking the English first-class record of 36 by Garfield Sobers from 1968.
