= 1932 County Championship =

English cricket tournament

- Cricket format: First-class cricket
- Tournament format: League system
- Champions: Yorkshire (16th title)

The 1932 County Championship was the 39th officially organised running of the County Championship. Yorkshire County Cricket Club won the championship title for the second successive year.

Percy Holmes and Herbert Sutcliffe set a new first-class opening partnership record of 555 for Yorkshire against Essex at Leyton.

== Table ==
- 15 points for a win
- 7.5 points to each team in a match where the scores finish level
- 5 points for first-innings lead in a drawn match
- 3 points for first-innings deficit in a drawn match
- 4 points to each team where the first-innings scores are level in a drawn match or where there is no result on first innings or where there is no play.

County Championship table
Team	Pld	W	L	DWF	DLF	NR	Pts
Yorkshire	28	19	2	3	1	3	315
Sussex	28	14	1	4	4	5	262
Kent	28	14	3	1	7	3	248
Nottinghamshire	28	13	4	6	4	1	241
Surrey	28	9	2	10	3	4	210
Lancashire	28	8	6	7	4	3	179
Somerset	28	8	7	3	7	3	168
Hampshire	28	8	10	3	6	1	157
Warwickshire	28	5	5	8	8	2	147
Derbyshire	28	6	8	5	6	3	145
Middlesex	28	6	9	8	5	0	145
Leicestershire	28	6	11	7	3	1	138
Gloucestershire	28	6	12	6	1	3	135
Essex	28	4	14	2	6	2	96
Glamorgan	28	3	12	2	9	2	90
Northamptonshire	28	3	15	3	5	2	83
Worcestershire	28	1	12	6	5	4	76
