= 1983 County Championship =

English cricket tournament

- Dates: 30 April – 13 September 1983
- Administrator: England and Wales Cricket Board
- Cricket format: First-class cricket
- Tournament format: League system
- Champions: Essex (2nd title)
- Participants: 17
- Matches: 204
- Most runs: Ken McEwan , (Essex); 2,051
- Most wickets: Derek Underwood, (Kent); 105

The 1983 Schweppes County Championship was the 84th officially organised running of the County Championship. Essex won the Championship title. The Championship was sponsored by Schweppes for the sixth and final time.

In May 1983, in the match between Essex and Surrey at Chelmsford, Surrey were dismissed in their first innings for 14 runs; as of 2025, it remains the lowest completed innings total in a Championship match since World War II.

== Table ==
- 16 points for a win
- 8 points to each team for a tie
- 8 points to team still batting in a match in which scores finish level
- Bonus points awarded in the first 100 overs of the first innings
  - Batting: 150 runs - 1 point, 200 runs - 2 points 250 runs - 3 points, 300 runs - 4 points
  - Bowling: 3-4 wickets - 1 point, 5-6 wickets - 2 points 7-8 wickets - 3 points, 9-10 wickets - 4 points
- No bonus points awarded in a match starting with less than 8 hours' play remaining. A one-innings match is played, with the winner gaining 12 points.
- Position determined by points gained. If equal, then decided on most wins.
- Each team plays 24 matches.

	Team	P	W	L	D	Bat	Bowl	Pts
1	Essex	24	11	5	8	69	79	324
2	Middlesex	24	11	4	8	60	72	308
3	Hampshire	24	10	2	12	62	71	289
4	Leicestershire	24	9	3	12	52	81	277
5	Warwickshire	24	10	3	11	52	64	276
6	Northamptonshire	24	7	4	13	63	77	252
7	Kent	24	7	4	13	68	70	250
8	Surrey	24	7	4	13	65	70	247
9	Derbyshire	24	7	5	12	46	65	219
10	Somerset	24	3	7	14	57	75	180
11	Sussex	24	3	10	10	50	72	170
12	Gloucestershire	24	3	8	12	56	61	165
13	Lancashire	24	3	4	17	56	61	165
14	Nottinghamshire	24	3	10	11	39	62	149
15	Glamorgan	24	2	10	12	45	64	141
16	Worcestershire	24	2	11	11	43	54	129
17	Yorkshire	24	1	5	17	45	64	125
