= Bob Stephenson (sportsman) =

English footballer and cricketer (born 1942)

Personal information
- Full name: George Robert Stephenson
- Born: 19 November 1942 (age 83); Derby, Derbyshire, England
- Batting: Right-handed
- Role: Wicketkeeper

Domestic team information
- Years: Team
- 1967-1968: Derbyshire
- 1969-1980: Hampshire

Career statistics
Competition	FC	LA
Matches	272	237
Runs scored	4,781	1,111
Batting average	16.42	9.91
100s/50s	1/10	–/–
Top score	100*	32
Balls bowled	55	–
Wickets	–	–
Bowling average	–	–
5 wickets in innings	–	–
10 wickets in match	–	–
Best bowling	–	–
Catches/stumpings	584/77	191/58
- Source: Cricinfo, 2 July 2020

Bob Stephenson
Personal information
- Full name: George Robert Stephenson
- Date of birth: 19 November 1942 (age 83)
- Place of birth: Derby, England
- Height: 5 ft 7 in (1.70 m)
- Position: Inside forward

Senior career*
Years	Team	Apps	(Gls)
?–1961?	Derwent Sports	?	
1961?–1963?	Derby County	11	(1)
1964?–1965?	Shrewsbury Town	3	(0)
1965?–1967?	Rochdale	51	(16)
1967	Lockheed Leamington	?	
- * Club domestic league appearances and goals

George Robert Stephenson (born 19 November 1942) is an English former cricketer and footballer.

He played first-class cricket for Derbyshire and Hampshire from 1967 to 1980. He also played football as an inside forward during the 1960s, most notably for Rochdale.

Stephenson was born in Derby. He was a right-handed batsman and wicket-keeper who played first-class cricket for Derbyshire between 1967 and 1968. He joined Hampshire for the 1969 season.

Hampshire played steadily in 1969 and finished the season in fifth place. However, the team struggled the following season and ended 1970 with only four victories.

Stephenson continued to serve Hampshire through the inconsistent times of the mid-70s, the highlight being the team's second-ever victory in the County Championship in 1973. Stephenson remained a first-team choice through the late 1970s and into the 1980 season, but he retired from first-class cricket after Hampshire finished bottom of the County Championship that year. Stephenson scored his only first-class century for Hampshire against Somerset in 1976. He served as club captain during his penultimate season after Richard Gilliat retired.

Stephenson also played professional football for Derby County, Shrewsbury Town, and Rochdale in the 1960s.

== See also ==
- List of English cricket and football players

Sporting positions
Preceded by Richard Gilliat	Hampshire cricket captain 1979	Succeeded by Nick Pocock
