= 1967 County Championship =

English cricket tournament

- Dates: 29 April – 8 September 1967
- Administrator: England and Wales Cricket Board
- Cricket format: First-class cricket
- Tournament format: League system
- Champions: Yorkshire (28th title)
- Participants: 17
- Matches: 238
- Most runs: Arthur Milton, (Gloucestershire); 1,971
- Most wickets: Tom Cartwright, (Warwickshire); 132

The 1967 County Championship was the 68th officially organised running of the County Championship. Yorkshire won their second consecutive Championship title.

The method of obtaining points changed again for a second successive year:

- 8 points for a win
- 4 points for a tie
- 4 points for a team batting first in a drawn match with scores level
- 4 points for a first innings lead
- 2 points for a tie on first innings
- 2 points for draw providing there is a first innings result
- One day rules scrapped

== Table ==
	Team	P	W	L	D	T	No Dec	1st Inns Lead	1st Inns Tie	Pts
1	Yorkshire	28	12	5	9	0	2	18	0	186
=2	Kent	28	11	3	12	0	2	16	0	176
=2	Leicestershire	28	10	3	12	0	3	18	0	176
4	Surrey	28	8	4	12	0	4	15	0	148
5	Worcestershire	28	6	6	16	0	0	13	0	132
6	Derbyshire	28	5	5	17	0	1	14	0	130
7	Middlesex	28	5	4	14	1	4	14	0	128
8	Somerset	28	5	7	14	0	2	13	0	120
=9	Northamptonshire	28	7	8	11	0	2	10	0	118
=9	Warwickshire	28	5	4	15 (Note: Warwickshire were awarded 4 points for the draw against Essex, as they were batting fourth when scores were tied.)	0	4	10	1	118
11	Lancashire	28	4	3	17	0	4	12	1	116
12	Hampshire	28	5	6	13 (Note: Hampshire were awarded 4 points for the draw against Leicestershire, as they were batting fourth when scores were tied.)	1	3	10	1	114
13	Sussex	28	5	9	12	0	2	10	0	104
14	Glamorgan	28	4	7	15	0	2	9	1	100
=15	Essex	28	3	9	14	0	2	9	0	88
=15	Nottinghamshire	28	0	4	22	0	2	11	0	88
17	Gloucestershire	28	3	11	9	0	5	11	0	86
