= 1952 County Championship =

English cricket tournament

- Cricket format: First-class cricket
- Tournament format: League system
- Champions: Surrey (8th title)
- Participants: 17
- Matches: 238
- Most runs: Harold Gimblett, (Somerset); 2,068
- Most wickets: Johnny Wardle, (Yorkshire); 158

The 1952 County Championship was the 53rd officially organised running of the County Championship. Surrey won the Championship title.

== Table ==
- 12 points for a win
- 6 points to each team in a match in which scores finish level
- 4 points for first innings lead in a lost or drawn match
- 2 points for tie on first innings in a lost or drawn match

Warwickshire and Lancashire records include eight points for a tied match with first innings lead; Sussex and Essex records include four points for tied match without first innings lead. Glamorgan and Worcestershire records include two points each for tie on first innings in drawn match.

	Team	P	W	L	D	T	No Dec	1st Inns Lead	1st Inns Tie	Pts
1	Surrey	28	20	3	5	0	0	6	0	256
2	Yorkshire	28	17	2	8	0	1	10	0	224
3	Lancashire	28	12	3	11	1	1	10	0	188
4	Derbyshire	28	11	8	9	0	0	6	0	164
5	Middlesex	28	11	12	4	0	1	8	0	136
6	Leicestershire	28	9	9	9	0	1	9	0	132
7	Glamorgan	28	8	7	13	0	0	8	0	130
8	Northamptonshire	28	7	8	12	0	1	9	1	128
9	Gloucestershire	28	7	10	11	0	0	10	0	124
=10	Essex	28	8	4	13	1	2	5	1	120
=10	Warwickshire	28	8	10	8	1	1	8	0	120
12	Hampshire	28	7	11	9	0	1	7	0	112
13	Sussex	28	7	12	6	1	2	8	0	96
14	Worcestershire	28	6	11	10	0	1	4	0	90
15	Kent	28	5	15	8	0	0	4	0	84
16	Nottinghamshire	28	3	11	13	0	1	3	0	72
17	Somerset	28	2	12	13	0	1	7	0	44
	Source: CricketArchive									
