= 1960 County Championship =

English cricket tournament

- Dates: 30 April – 6 September 1960
- Cricket format: First-class cricket
- Tournament format: League system
- Champions: Yorkshire (24th title)
- Participants: 17
- Matches: 254
- Most runs: Peter Wight, (Somerset); 2,086
- Most wickets: Les Jackson, (Derbyshire); 146

The 1960 County Championship was the 61st officially organised running of the County Championship. Yorkshire won their second successive Championship title.

== Table ==
- 12 points for a win
- 6 points to team still batting in the fourth innings of a match in which scores finish level
- 2 points for first innings lead
- 1 point for tie on first innings in a lost or drawn match
- 2 bonus points for team leading on first innings if they also score faster on runs per over in first innings
- If no play possible on the first two days, and the match does not go into the second innings, the team leading on first innings scores 8 points.
- Teams played either 28 or 32 matches. Therefore, a final average was calculated by dividing the points by the matches played which determined the final placings.

	Team	P	W	L	D	No Dec	1st Inns Lead	1st Inns Tie	Bonus	Pts	Average
1	Yorkshire	32	17	6	6	3	4	0	34	246	7.68
2	Lancashire	32	13	8	10	1	12	0	34	214	6.68
3	Middlesex	28	12	4	12	0	7	0	28	186	6.64
4	Sussex	32	12	6	12	2	8	0	28	188	5.87
5	Derbyshire	28	10	7	10	1	6	0	20	152	5.42
6	Essex	28	9	3	14	2	8	0	28	152	5.42
7	Surrey	28	9	6	10	3	5	0	20	138	4.92
8	Gloucestershire	28	9	7	12	0	3	0	16	130	4.64
9	Northamptonshire	28	8	6	13	1	7	0	16	126	4.50
10	Kent	28	7	7	12	2	7	0	20	118	4.21
11	Glamorgan	32	9	14	7	2	4	1	16	133	4.15
12	Hampshire	32	8	8	14	2	7	0	22	132	4.12
13	Worcestershire	32	8	12	10	2	7	0	20	130	4.06
14	Somerset	32	5	11	15	1	12	0	22	106	3.31
15	Warwickshire	32	4	12	16	0	11	0	26	96	3.00
16	Nottinghamshire	28	4	16	7	1	6	0	12	72	2.57
17	Leicestershire	28	2	13	12	1	5	0	12	46	1.64
