= 1970 County Championship =

English cricket tournament

- Dates: 2 May – 15 September 1970
- Administrator: England and Wales Cricket Board
- Cricket format: First-class cricket
- Tournament format: League system
- Champions: Kent (5th title)
- Participants: 17
- Matches: 204
- Most runs: Glenn Turner, (Worcestershire); 2,346
- Most wickets: Don Shepherd, (Glamorgan); 101

The 1970 County Championship was the 71st officially organised running of the County Championship. Kent won the Championship title.

== Table ==
- 10 points for a win
- 5 points to each team for a tie
- 5 points to team still batting in a match in which scores finish level
- Bonus points awarded in first 85 overs of first innings
- Batting: 1 point for each 25 runs above 150
- Bowling: 2 point for every 2 wickets taken
- No bonus points awarded in a match starting with less than 8 hours' play remaining.
- Position determined by points gained. If equal, then decided on most wins.
- Each team plays 24 matches.

	Team	P	W	L	D	Bat	Bowl	Pts
1	Kent	24	9	5	10	70	77	237
2	Glamorgan	24	9	6	9	48	82	220
3	Lancashire	24	6	2	16	78	78	216
4	Yorkshire	24	8	5	11	49	86	215
5	Surrey	24	6	4	14	60	83	203
6	Worcestershire	24	7	1	16	46	84	200
=7	Derbyshire	24	7	7	10	51	78	199
=7	Warwickshire	24	7	6	11 (Note: Warwickshire were awarded 5 points for the draw against Surrey, as they were batting fourth when scores were tied.)	53	71	199
=7	Sussex	24	5	7	12	62	87	199
10	Hampshire	24	4	6	14	69	88	197
11	Nottinghamshire	24	4	8	12	71	73	184
12	Essex	24	4	6	14	64	76	180
13	Somerset	24	5	10	9	40	86	176
14	Northamptonshire	24	4	6	14	60	74	174
15	Leicestershire	24	5	6	13	46	77	173
=16	Middlesex	24	5	5	14	47	69	166
=16	Gloucestershire	24	3	8	13	56	80	166
