= 1957 County Championship =

English cricket tournament

- Cricket format: First-class cricket
- Tournament format: League system
- Champions: Surrey (13th title)
- Participants: 17
- Matches: 238
- Most runs: Jim Parks, Jr., (Sussex); 1,861
- Most wickets: Tony Lock , (Surrey); 153

The 1957 County Championship was the 58th officially organised running of the County Championship. Surrey won the Championship title for the sixth successive year.

Changes were applied to the points system for the Championship as follows:

- 12 points for a win
- 6 points to team still batting in the fourth innings of a match in which scores finish level
- 2 points for first innings lead
- 2 bonus points for team leading on first innings if they also score faster on runs per over in first innings
- If no play possible on the first two days, and the match does not go into the second innings, the team leading on first innings scores 8 points.

== Table ==
	Team	P	W	L	D	No Dec	1st Inns Lead	Bonus	Pts
1	Surrey	28	21	3	3	1	6	48	312
2	Northamptonshire	28	15	2	10	1	8	22	218
3	Yorkshire	28	13	4	11	0	5	24	190
4	Derbyshire	28	10	8	9	1	6	30	162
5	Essex	28	11	6	10	1	5	16	158
6	Lancashire	28	10	8	8	2	6	24	156
7	Middlesex	28	10	12	3	3	3	22	148
8	Somerset	28	9	14	5	0	5	20	138
=9	Glamorgan	28	10	9	8	1	2	12	136
=9	Sussex	28	8	9	9	2	8	24	136
11	Warwickshire	28	9	7	11	1	5	16	134
12	Gloucestershire	28	8	13	6	1	6	24	132
13	Hampshire	28	7	12	8	1	6	20	116
14	Kent	28	6	13	9	0	5	8	90
15	Nottinghamshire	28	5	13	9	1	7	14	88
16	Worcestershire	28	4	9	14 (Note: Worcestershire were awarded six points for the draw against Sussex, as they were batting fourth when scores were tied.)	1	5	8	72
17	Leicestershire	28	2	16	9	1	7	2	40
