= 1978 John Player League =

- Administrator(s): Test and County Cricket Board
- Cricket format: Limited overs cricket (40 overs per innings)
- Tournament format(s): League
- Champions: Hampshire (2nd title)
- Participants: 17
- Matches: 136
- Most runs: 637 Gordon Greenidge (Hampshire)
- Most wickets: 27 Les Taylor (Leicestershire)

The 1978 John Player League was the tenth competing of what was generally known as the Sunday League. The competition was won for the second time by Hampshire County Cricket Club.

== Standings ==
Team	Pld	W	T	L	N/R	A	Pts	R/R
Hampshire (C)	16	11	0	3	0	2	48	5.356
Somerset	16	11	0	3	0	2	48	4.580
Leicestershire	16	11	0	3	0	2	48	4.266
Worcestershire	16	10	0	5	0	1	42	4.567
Lancashire	16	9	0	6	0	1	38	4.632
Essex	16	7	0	6	0	3	34	4.633
Yorkshire	16	7	0	7	0	2	32	4.807
Derbyshire	16	6	0	7	1	2	30	4.569
Sussex	16	6	0	7	0	3	30	4.038
Glamorgan	16	6	0	8	0	2	28	4.501
Kent	16	6	0	8	1	1	28	4.144
Surrey	16	6	0	8	1	1	28	4.090
Northamptonshire	16	5	0	8	1	2	26	4.543
Nottinghamshire	16	4	0	7	0	5	26	4.515
Middlesex	16	5	0	9	0	2	24	4.299
Warwickshire	16	4	0	11	0	1	18	4.438
Gloucestershire	16	3	0	11	0	2	16	4.257
Team marked (C) finished as champions. Source: CricketArchive

== See also ==
Sunday League
