= 1980 County Championship =

English cricket tournament

- Dates: 30 April – 5 September 1980
- Administrator: England and Wales Cricket Board
- Cricket format: First-class cricket
- Tournament format: League system
- Champions: Middlesex (6th title)
- Participants: 17
- Matches: 183
- Most runs: Peter Kirsten, (Derbyshire); 2,441
- Most wickets: Robin Jackman, (Surrey); 114

The 1980 Schweppes County Championship was the 81st officially organised running of the County Championship. Middlesex won the Championship title.

== Table ==
- 12 points for a win
- 6 points to each team for a tie
- 6 points to team still batting in a match in which scores finish level
- Bonus points awarded in first 100 overs of first innings
  - Batting: 150 runs - 1 point, 200 runs - 2 points 250 runs - 3 points, 300 runs - 4 points
  - Bowling: 3-4 wickets - 1 point, 5-6 wickets - 2 points 7-8 wickets - 3 points, 9-10 wickets - 4 points
- No bonus points awarded in a match starting with less than 8 hours' play remaining.
- The two first innings limited to a total of 200 overs. The team batting first limited to 100 overs. Any overs up to 100 not used by the team batting first could be added to the overs of the team batting second.
- Position determined by points gained. If equal, then decided on most wins.
- Each team plays 22 matches.

Four matches were abandoned without a ball being bowled and are not included in the table. The Championship was sponsored by Schweppes for the third time.

	Team	P	W	L	D	Bat	Bowl	Pts
1	Middlesex	22	10	2	10	58	80	258
2	Surrey	22	10	4	8	51	74	245
3	Nottinghamshire	22	6	5	11	42	64	178
4	Sussex	22	4	3	15	60	60	168
5	Somerset	21	3	5	13	56	70	168
6	Yorkshire	22	4	3	15	51	64	163
7	Gloucestershire	21	4	5	12	39	74	161
8	Essex	22	4	3	15	48	64	160
9	Derbyshire	20	4	3	13	47	62	157
10	Leicestershire	22	4	2	16	45	58	157
11	Worcestershire	21	3	7	11	54	61	151
12	Northamptonshire	22	5	4	13	41	47	148
13	Glamorgan	21	4	4	13	43	57	148
14	Warwickshire	22	3	4	15	55	54	145
15	Lancashire	20	4	3	13	26	58	132
16	Kent	22	2	8	12	36	59	119
17	Hampshire	22	1	10	11	34	56	102
