= 1974 County Championship =

English cricket tournament

- Dates: 1 May – 6 September 1974
- Administrator: England and Wales Cricket Board
- Cricket format: First-class cricket
- Tournament format: League system
- Champions: Worcestershire (3rd title)
- Participants: 17
- Matches: 168
- Most runs: Roy Virgin, (Northamptonshire); 1,845
- Most wickets: Andy Roberts, (Hampshire); 111

The 1974 County Championship was the 75th officially organised running of the County Championship. Worcestershire won the Championship title.

== Points system ==
- 10 points for a win
- 5 points to each team for a tie
- 5 points to team still batting in a match in which scores finish level
- Bonus points awarded in the first 100 overs of the first innings
  - Batting: 150 runs - 1 point, 200 runs - 2 points 250 runs - 3 points, 300 runs - 4 points
  - Bowling: 3 wickets - 1 point, 5 wickets - 2 points 7 wickets - 3 points, 9 wickets - 4 points
- No bonus points awarded in a match starting with less than 8 hours' play remaining.
- The two first innings limited to a total of 200 overs. The team batting first limited to 100 overs. Any overs up to 100 not used by the team batting first could be added to the overs of the team batting second.
- Position determined by points gained. If equal, then decided on most wins.
- Each team plays 20 matches.
- All counties are required to achieve an overall average of at least 18.5 overs per hour. Counties failing to achieve this will be fined £1000, of which the club will pay half and the players half.

== Table ==
	Team	P	W	L	D	T	Bat	Bowl	Pts
1	Worcestershire	20	11	3	6	0	45	72	227
2	Hampshire	19	10	3	6	0	55	70	225
3	Northamptonshire	20	9	2	9	0	46	67	203
4	Leicestershire	20	7	7	6	0	47	69	186
5	Somerset	20	6	4	10	0	49	72	181
6	Middlesex	20	7	5	8	0	45	56	171
7	Surrey	20	6	4	10	0	42	69	171
8	Lancashire	20	5	0	15	0	47	66	163
9	Warwickshire	20	5	5	10	0	44	65	159
10	Kent	20	5	8	7	0	33	63	146
11	Yorkshire	19	4	7	8	0	37	69	146
12	Essex	20	4	3	12	1	44	52	146
13	Sussex	20	4	9	6	1	29	63	141
14	Gloucestershire	19	4	9	6	0	29	55	124
15	Nottinghamshire	20	1	9	10	0	42	66	118
16	Glamorgan	19	2	7	10	0	28	56	104
17	Derbyshire	20	1	6	13	0	23	62	95
