= 1977 County Championship =

English cricket tournament

- Dates: 4 May – 9 September 1977
- Administrator: England and Wales Cricket Board
- Cricket format: First-class cricket
- Tournament format: League system
- Champions: Middlesex & Kent
- Participants: 17
- Matches: 181
- Most runs: Viv Richards, (Somerset); 2,090
- Most wickets: Mike Proctor, (Gloucestershire); 108

The 1977 County Championship was the 78th officially organised running of the County Championship. The Championship title was shared for only the third time in history after Middlesex and Kent finished on the same points.

There was one change to the points system with twelve points awarded for a winning team instead of ten and six matches were abandoned without a ball being bowled and are not included in the table.

== Table ==
- 12 points for a win
- 5 points to each team for a tie
- 5 points to team still batting in a match in which scores finish level
- Bonus points awarded in first 100 overs of first innings
  - Batting: 150 runs - 1 point, 200 runs - 2 points 250 runs - 3 points, 300 runs - 4 points
  - Bowling: 3-4 wickets - 1 point, 5-6 wickets - 2 points 7-8 wickets - 3 points, 9-10 wickets - 4 points
- No bonus points awarded in a match starting with less than 8 hours' play remaining.
- The two first innings limited to a total of 200 overs. The team batting first limited to 100 overs. Any overs up to 100 not used by the team batting first could be added to the overs of the team batting second.
- Position determined by points gained. If equal, then decided on most wins.
- Each team plays 22 matches.

	Team	P	W	L	D	Bat	Bowl	Pts
1	Middlesex	22	9	5	8	43	76	227
2	Kent	21	9	2	10	54	65	227
3	Gloucestershire	20	9	5	6	44	70	222
4	Somerset	21	6	4	11	58	64	194
5	Leicestershire	22	6	4	12	44	73	189
6	Essex	21	7	5	9	38	65	187
7	Derbyshire	21	7	3	11	38	64	186
8	Sussex	22	6	5	11	52	60	184
9	Northamptonshire	20	6	6	8	43	68	183
10	Warwickshire	22	4	8	10	61	72	181
11	Hampshire	22	6	5	11	53	54	179
12	Yorkshire	21	6	5	10	36	63	171
13	Worcestershire	22	5	10	7	29	55	144
14	Glamorgan	21	3	7	11	36	60	132
15	Surrey	21	3	6	12	42	54	132
16	Lancashire	21	2	4	15	36	57	117
17	Nottinghamshire	22	1	11	10	34	52	98
