= 1955 County Championship =

English cricket tournament

- Cricket format: First-class cricket
- Tournament format: League system
- Champions: Surrey (11th title)
- Participants: 17
- Matches: 238
- Most runs: Jock Livingston, (Northamptonshire); 1,957
- Most wickets: George Tribe, (Northamptonshire); 169

The 1955 County Championship was the 56th officially organised running of the County Championship. Surrey won the Championship title for the fourth successive year.

== Table ==
- 12 points for a win
- 6 points to team still batting in the fourth innings of a match in which scores finish level
- 4 points for first innings lead in a lost or drawn match
- 2 points for tie on first innings in a lost or drawn match
- If no play possible on the first two days, the match played to one-day laws with 8 points for a win.

	Team	P	W	L	D	T	No Dec	1st Inns Lead	1st Inns Tie	Pts
1	Surrey	28	23	5	0	0	0	2	0	284
2	Yorkshire	28	21	5	2	0	0	4	0	268
3	Hampshire	28	16	5	6	1	0	3	0	210
4	Sussex	28	13	8	6	1	0	8	1	196
5	Middlesex	28	14	12	2	0	0	6	0	192
6	Leicestershire	28	11	10	7	0	0	5	1	154
7	Northamptonshire	28	9	10	9	0	0	10	0	148
8	Derbyshire	28	9	10	9	0	0	9	1	146
=9	Lancashire	28	10	9	8	0	1	5	0	140
=9	Warwickshire	28	10	9	9	0	0	5	0	140
11	Nottinghamshire	28	10	11	7	0	0	3	0	132
12	Gloucestershire	28	9	13	6	0	0	5	0	128
13	Kent	28	8	13	7	0	0	2	0	104
14	Essex	28	6	15	7	0	0	7	0	100
15	Worcestershire	28	5	17	6	0	0	6	0	84
16	Glamorgan	28	5	14	8	0	1	5	0	80
17	Somerset	28	4	17	7	0	0	4	0	64
