= 1976 County Championship =

English cricket tournament

- Dates: 28 April – 10 September 1976
- Administrator: England and Wales Cricket Board
- Cricket format: First-class cricket
- Tournament format: League system
- Champions: Middlesex (5th title)
- Participants: 17
- Matches: 169
- Most runs: Zaheer Abbas, (Gloucestershire); 2,431
- Most wickets: Sarfraz Nawaz, (Northamptonshire); 82

The 1976 County Championship was the 77th officially organised running of the County Championship. Middlesex won the Championship title.

== Table ==
- 10 points for a win
- 5 points to each team for a tie
- 5 points to team still batting in a match in which scores finish level
- Bonus points awarded in first 100 overs of first innings
  - Batting: 150 runs - 1 point, 200 runs - 2 points 250 runs - 3 points, 300 runs - 4 points
  - Bowling: 3-4 wickets - 1 point, 5-6 wickets - 2 points 7-8 wickets - 3 points, 9-10 wickets - 4 points
- No bonus points awarded in a match starting with less than 8 hours' play remaining.
- The two first innings limited to a total of 200 overs. The team batting first limited to 100 overs. Any overs up to 100 not used by the team batting first could be added to the overs of the team batting second.
- Position determined by points gained. If equal, then decided on most wins.
- Each team plays 20 matches.
- All counties are required to achieve an overall average of at least 19.5 overs per hour. In the calculation, two minutes will be allowed for each wicket taken. Counties failing to reach this average will be fined £1000, half to be paid by the club and half by the players. The fines to be assed after ten matches and at the end of the season. Club fines to go to the N.C.A., players fines to go to the Cricketers' Association.

	Team	P	W	L	D	Bat	Bowl	Pts
1	Middlesex	20	11	5	4	57	67	234
2	Northamptonshire	20	9	3	8	54	74	218
3	Gloucestershire	19	9	5	5	54	66	210
4	Leicestershire	20	9	3	8	51	68	209
5	Warwickshire	20	6	7	7	65	70	195
6	Essex	20	7	4	9	57	62	189
7	Somerset	20	7	8	5	47	63	180
8	Yorkshire	20	6	6	8	49	67	176
9	Surrey	20	6	4	10	54	61	175
10	Sussex	20	5	8	7	49	71	170
11	Worcestershire	19	6	3	10	50	59	169
12	Hampshire	20	4	10	6	52	67	159
13	Nottinghamshire	20	4	7	9	58	60	158
14	Kent	20	5	7	8	48	57	155
15	Derbyshire	20	4	7	9	39	70	149
16	Lancashire	20	3	7	10	43	75	148
17	Glamorgan	20	3	10	7	37	60	127

- The match between Gloucestershire and Worcestershire at Bristol was abandoned without a ball being bowled and is not included in the table.
