= 1982 County Championship =

English cricket tournament

- Dates: 5 May – 14 September 1982
- Administrator: England and Wales Cricket Board
- Cricket format: First-class cricket
- Tournament format: League system
- Champions: Middlesex (7th title)
- Participants: 17
- Matches: 187
- Most runs: Alvin Kallicharran, (Warwickshire); 2,118
- Most wickets: Malcolm Marshall, (Hampshire); 134

The 1982 Schweppes County Championship was the 83rd officially organised running of the County Championship. Middlesex won the Championship title. The Championship was sponsored by Schweppes for the fifth time.

== Table ==
- 16 points for a win
- 8 points to each team for a tie
- 8 points to team still batting in a match in which scores finish level
- Bonus points awarded in the first 100 overs of the first innings
  - Batting: 150 runs - 1 point, 200 runs - 2 points 250 runs - 3 points, 300 runs - 4 points
  - Bowling: 3-4 wickets - 1 point, 5-6 wickets - 2 points 7-8 wickets - 3 points, 9-10 wickets - 4 points
- No bonus points awarded in a match starting with less than 8 hours' play remaining. A one-innings match is played, with the winner gaining 12 points.
- Position determined by points gained. If equal, then decided on most wins.
- Each team plays 22 matches.

| | Team | P | W | L | D | Bat | Bowl | Pts |
|---|---|---|---|---|---|---|---|---|
| 1 | Middlesex | 22 | 12 | 2 | 8 | 59 | 74 | 325 |
| 2 | Leicestershire | 22 | 10 | 4 | 8 | 57 | 69 | 286 |
| 3 | Hampshire | 22 | 8 | 6 | 8 | 48 | 74 | 250 |
| 4 | Nottinghamshire | 22 | 7 | 7 | 8 | 44 | 65 | 221 |
| 5 | Surrey | 22 | 6 | 6 | 10 | 56 | 62 | 214 |
| 6 | Somerset | 22 | 6 | 6 | 10 | 51 | 66 | 213 |
| 7 | Essex | 22 | 5 | 5 | 12 | 57 | 72 | 212 |
| 8 | Sussex | 22 | 6 | 7 | 9 | 42 | 68 | 207 |
| 9 | Northamptonshire | 22 | 5 | 3 | 14 | 61 | 54 | 195 |
| 10 | Yorkshire | 22 | 5 | 1 | 16 | 48 | 51 | 179 |
| 11 | Derbyshire | 22 | 4 | 3 | 15 | 45 | 64 | 173 |
| 12 | Lancashire | 22 | 4 | 3 | 15 | 48 | 55 | 167 |
| 13 | Kent | 22 | 3 | 4 | 15 | 55 | 63 | 166 |
| 14 | Worcestershire | 22 | 3 | 5 | 14 | 43 | 54 | 141 |
| 15 | Gloucestershire | 22 | 2 | 9 | 11 | 46 | 55 | 133 |
| 16 | Glamorgan | 22 | 1 | 8 | 13 | 43 | 60 | 119 |
| 17 | Warwickshire | 22 | 0 | 8 | 14 | 58 | 53 | 111 |
