= 1979 County Championship =

English cricket tournament

- Dates: 2 May – 7 September 1979
- Administrator: England and Wales Cricket Board
- Cricket format: First-class cricket
- Tournament format: League system
- Champions: Essex (1st title)
- Participants: 17
- Matches: 177
- Most runs: Glenn Turner, (Worcestershire); 1,669
- Most wickets: Derek Underwood, (Kent); 104

The 1979 Schweppes County Championship was the 80th officially organised running of the County Championship. Essex won their first Championship title.

== Table ==
- 12 points for a win
- 6 points to each team for a tie
- 6 points to team still batting in a match in which scores finish level
- Bonus points awarded in first 100 overs of first innings
  - Batting: 150 runs - 1 point, 200 runs - 2 points 250 runs - 3 points, 300 runs - 4 points
  - Bowling: 3-4 wickets - 1 point, 5-6 wickets - 2 points 7-8 wickets - 3 points, 9-10 wickets - 4 points
- No bonus points awarded in a match starting with less than 8 hours' play remaining.
- The two first innings limited to a total of 200 overs. The team batting first limited to 100 overs. Any overs up to 100 not used by the team batting first could be added to the overs of the team batting second.
- Position determined by points gained. If equal, then decided on most wins.
- Each team plays 22 matches.

Ten matches were abandoned without a ball being bowled and are not included in the table. The number of points awarded for a tie was increased from 5 to 6 points and the number of points awarded to a team batting last in a drawn match with the scores level also increased from 5 to 6 points. The Championship was sponsored by Schweppes for the second time.

	Team	P	W	L	D	Bat	Bowl	Pts
1	Essex	21	13	4	4	56	69	281
2	Worcestershire	21	7	4	10	58	62	204
3	Surrey	21	6	3	12	50	70	192
4	Sussex	20	6	4	10	47	65	184
5	Kent	22	6	3	13	49	60	181
6	Leicestershire	21	4	5	12	60	68	176
7	Yorkshire	21	5	3	13	52	63	175
8	Somerset	21	5	1	15	56	53	171
9	Nottinghamshire	19	6	4	9	43	54	169
10	Gloucestershire	20	5	4	11	53	54	167
11	Northamptonshire	21	3	6	12	59	58	153
12	Hampshire	21	3	9	9	39	66	141
13	Lancashire	22	4	4	14	37	55	140
14	Middlesex	20	3	3	14	44	60	140
15	Warwickshire	21	3	7	11	46	51	133
16	Derbyshire	21	1	6	14	46	60	118
17	Glamorgan	21	0	10	11	35	58	93
