= Britannic Assurance =

English insurance company

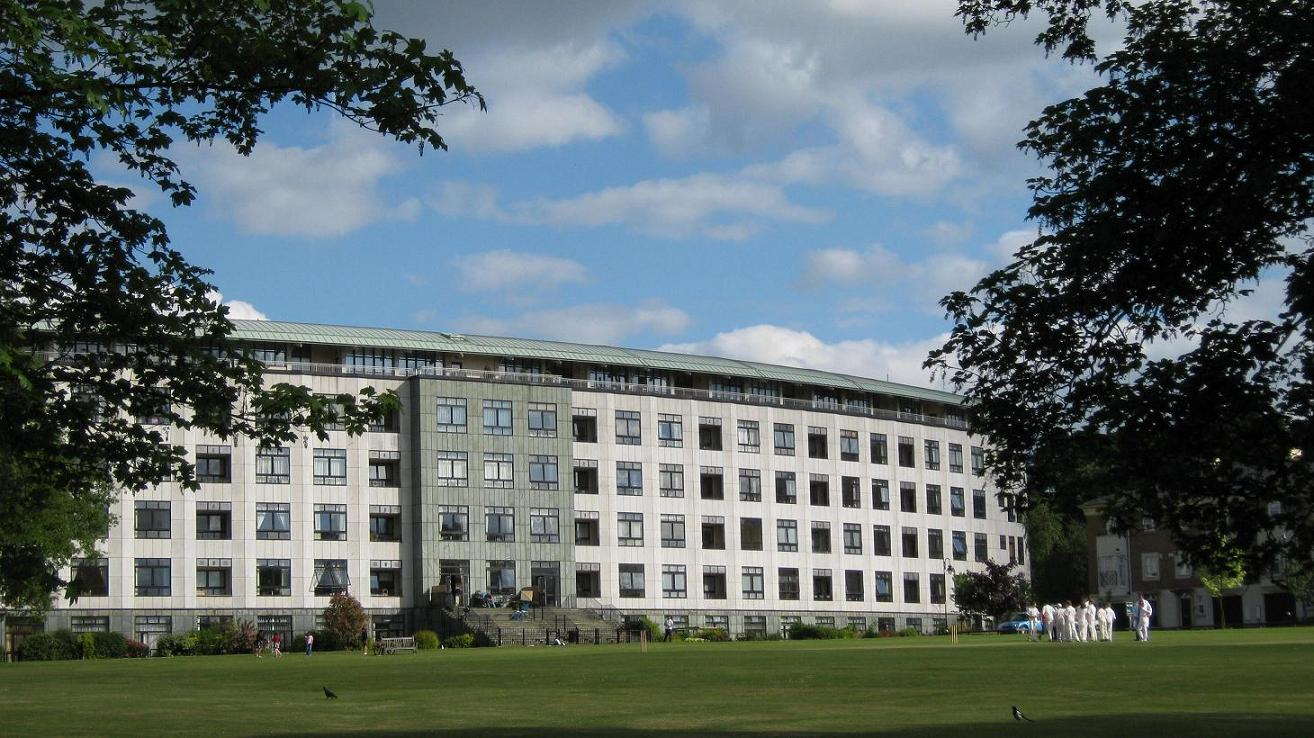
- The company's head office at Moor Green
- Industry: Insurance
- Founded: 1866; 160 years ago
- Defunct: 2003
- Fate: Merged with Resolution plc
- Successor: Phoenix Group
- Headquarters: Birmingham, England

Britannic Assurance was a major British insurance company based in Birmingham, England.

== History ==
The company was founded as the British Workmen's and General Insurance Company in Birmingham in 1866. It changed its name to Britannic Assurance in the early 20th century and established a large new office at Broad Street Corner in Birmingham in 1904.

The company acquired Moor Green House and its grounds in Birmingham and established playing grounds for its staff there in the 1920s. It commissioned new offices there in the 1960s. The new offices were designed in the modern style, built in concrete and glass and were opened by the Lord Mayor of Birmingham, Ernest Walter Horton, on 21 March 1963. The company sponsored the Cricket County Championship from 1984 to 1998. The company acquired the Glasgow-based insurance company, Alba Life, in 1999.

Following the company's departure from the Moor Green site, the main office block was converted into apartments in 1999. After issuing a profits warning in January 2003, it closed to new business in March 2003. It acquired the closed life fund of Cornhill Insurance in December 2004 and then merged with Resolution plc in September 2005.
