= Lists of cricket records =

All lists of cricket records are listed here:

== General cricket records ==
=== Men ===
- List of first-class cricket records
- List of Test cricket records
- List of List A cricket records
- List of One Day International cricket records
- List of Twenty20 cricket records
- List of Twenty20 International records
- List of Cricket World Cup records

=== Women ===
- List of women's Test cricket records
- List of women's One Day International cricket records
- List of women's Twenty20 International records
- List of Women's Cricket World Cup records

== List of records concerning county cricket ==
Records for first-class counties within the England and Wales Cricket Board area are listed below.

- List of Derbyshire first-class cricket records
- List of Derbyshire List A cricket records
- List of Durham first-class cricket records
- List of Durham List A cricket records
- List of Essex first-class cricket records
- List of Essex List A cricket records
- List of Glamorgan first-class cricket records
- List of Hampshire CCC first-class cricket records
- List of Hampshire CCC List A cricket records
- List of Hampshire CCC Twenty20 cricket records
- List of Kent County Cricket Club first-class cricket records
- List of Kent County Cricket Club List A cricket records
- List of Kent County Cricket Club Twenty20 cricket records
- List of Northamptonshire List A cricket records
- List of Somerset first-class cricket records
- List of Somerset List A cricket records
- List of Somerset Twenty20 cricket records
- List of Surrey first-class cricket records
- List of Surrey List A cricket records
- List of Surrey Twenty20 cricket records

== List of records by country ==
=== Men ===
Afghanistan

- List of Afghanistan One Day International cricket records
- List of Afghanistan Test cricket records
- List of Afghanistan Twenty20 International cricket records

Australia

- List of Australia One Day International cricket records
- List of Australia Test cricket records
- List of Australia Twenty20 International cricket records

Bangladesh

- List of Bangladesh One Day International cricket records
- List of Bangladesh Test cricket records
- List of Bangladesh Twenty20 International cricket records

England

- List of England One Day International cricket records
- List of England Test cricket records
- List of England Twenty20 International cricket records

India

- List of India One Day International cricket records
- List of India Test cricket records
- List of India Twenty20 International cricket records

Nepal

- List of Nepal One Day International cricket records
- List of Nepal Twenty20 International cricket records

New Zealand

- List of New Zealand One Day International cricket records
- List of New Zealand Test cricket records
- List of New Zealand Twenty20 International Cricket records

Pakistan

- List of Pakistan One Day International cricket records
- List of Pakistan Test cricket records
- List of Pakistan Twenty20 International cricket records

South Africa

- List of South Africa One Day International cricket records
- List of South Africa Test cricket records
- List of South Africa Twenty20 International cricket records

Sri Lanka

- List of Sri Lanka One Day International cricket records
- List of Sri Lanka Test cricket records
- List of Sri Lanka Twenty20 International cricket records

West Indies

- List of West Indies One Day International cricket records
- List of West Indies Test cricket records
- List of West Indies Twenty20 International cricket records

Zimbabwe

- List of Zimbabwe One Day International cricket records
- List of Zimbabwe Test cricket records
- List of Zimbabwe Twenty20 International cricket records

=== Women ===
Australia

- List of Australian women's national cricket team records

Bangladesh

- List of Bangladesh women's national cricket team records

England

- List of England women's national cricket team records

India

- List of India women's national cricket team records

Ireland

- List of Ireland women's national cricket team records

New Zealand

- List of New Zealand women's national cricket team records
- List of New Zealand Women's One Day International cricket records
- List of New Zealand Women's Twenty20 International cricket records

Pakistan

- List of Pakistan women's national cricket team records

South Africa

- List of South Africa women's national cricket team records

Sri Lanka

- List of Sri Lanka women's national cricket team records

West Indies

- List of West Indies women's national cricket team records

== Other ==
=== Men ===
- List of players who have scored 10,000 or more runs in Test cricket
- List of bowlers who have taken 300 or more wickets in Test cricket
- List of players who have scored 10,000 or more runs in One Day International cricket
- List of bowlers who have taken 300 or more wickets in ODI cricket
- List of batsmen who have scored 100 centuries in first-class cricket
- List of first-class cricket quadruple centuries
- List of cricketers who have taken five-wicket hauls on ODI debut
- List of ODI cricket centuries scored on debut
- List of One Day International cricket hat-tricks
- List of highest individual scores in ODIs
- List of highest individual scores in cricket
- List of Test cricket records
- List of Test cricket triple centuries
- List of players who have scored 3,000 or more runs in Twenty20 International cricket

=== Women ===
- List of women's international cricket hat-tricks
- List of women's Test cricketers who have taken five wickets on debut
- List of players who have scored 3,000 or more runs in Women's Twenty20 International cricket

=== Combined ===
- List of bowlers who have taken a wicket with their first ball in a format of international cricket
- List of cricketers with centuries in all international formats
- List of cricketers with five-wicket hauls in all international formats
- List of cricketers by number of international centuries scored
- List of cricketers by number of international five-wicket hauls
- Variations in published cricket statistics
