= 1969 Player's County League =

- Administrator: Test and County Cricket Board
- Cricket format: Limited overs cricket (40 overs per innings)
- Tournament format: League
- Champions: Lancashire (1st title)
- Participants: 17
- Matches: 136
- Most runs: 517 Michael Smith (Middlesex)
- Most wickets: 29 Ray East (Essex)

The 1969 Player's County League was the first competing of what was colloquially known as the Sunday League. The second one-day league in England and Wales, it consisted of the seventeen first-class counties playing each other on Sunday afternoons throughout the season. The competition was won by Lancashire County Cricket Club.

== Standings ==
Team	Pld	W	T	L	N/R	A	Pts	R/R
Lancashire (C)	16	12	0	3	0	1	49	4.217
Hampshire	16	12	0	4	0	0	48	4.142
Essex	16	11	0	4	1	0	45	4.305
Kent	16	9	1	6	0	0	38	3.948
Surrey	16	9	0	6	1	0	37	3.762
Gloucestershire	16	8	0	8	0	0	32	3.690
Middlesex	16	7	0	7	0	2	30	4.181
Yorkshire	16	7	0	7	0	2	30	3.958
Warwickshire	16	6	0	6	0	4	28	3.959
Glamorgan	16	7	0	9	0	0	28	3.619
Leicestershire	16	6	0	7	0	3	27	4.086
Worcestershire	16	6	0	7	1	2	27	3.956
Nottinghamshire	16	5	1	9	0	1	23	4.142
Northamptonshire	16	5	0	9	1	1	22	3.988
Derbyshire	16	5	0	10	0	1	21	3.852
Somerset	16	5	0	10	0	1	21	3.635
Sussex	16	3	0	11	2	0	14	4.193
Team marked (C) finished as champions. Source: CricketArchive

== Batting averages ==
Player	County	Matches	Innings	Runs	Average	Highest Score	100s	50s
Greg Chappell	Somerset	15	15	456	38.00	128*	1	2
Michael Smith	Middlesex	14	14	517	36.92	103	1	4
Harry Pilling	Lancashire	15	15	405	33.75	76*	0	5
Barry Richards	Hampshire	13	13	405	33.75	85*	0	3
Brian Bolus	Nottinghamshire	15	15	462	33.00	86	0	4
Brian Luckhurst	Kent	16	16	424	30.28	76	0	3
Qualification: 400 runs. Source: CricketArchive

== Bowling averages ==
Player	County	Balls	Wickets	Average	Economy	BBI	4wi	5wi
Keith Boyce	Essex	708	26	12.00	2.54	3/15	0	0
Peter Sainsbury	Hampshire	644	28	13.96	3.64	4/23	2	0
Stuart Turner	Essex	639	27	14.85	3.76	4/14	1	0
Ken Higgs	Lancashire	673	26	15.23	3.53	4/22	1	0
Ray East	Essex	660	29	15.24	4.01	6/18	0	2
Butch White	Hampshire	698	26	17.92	4.00	5/31	1	1
Qualification: 25 wickets. Source: CricketArchive

== See also ==
- Sunday League
