= List of Durham List A cricket records =

This is a list of Durham List A cricket records; that is, record team and individual performances in List A cricket for Durham. Records for Durham in first-class cricket, the longer form of the game, are found at List of Durham first-class cricket records.

== Notation ==
Team Notation: When a team score is listed as "300-3", this indicates that they have scored 300 runs for the loss of 3 wickets. If it is followed by a "d", this indicates that the side declared. When the team score is listed as "300", this means the side was all out.

Batting Notation: When a batsman's score is listed as "100", the batsman scored 100 runs and was out. If it followed by an asterisk *, the batsman was not out.

Bowling Notation: "5/100" indicates that the bowler took 5 wickets while conceding 100 runs.

== Team records ==
	Total Runs	Opponents	Venue	Season
Highest for Durham	427-9	v Sussex	Hove	2023
Highest against Durham	361-7	by Essex	Chelmsford	1996
Lowest for Durham	72	v Warwickshire	Birmingham	2002
Lowest against Durham	63	by Hertfordshire	Darlington	1964
Source: CricketArchive. Last updated: 7 August 2023

== Batting Records ==
	Runs	Batsman	Opponents	Venue	Season
Highest individual innings	150*	(England) Ben Stokes	v Warwickshire	Birmingham	2011
Most runs in a season for Durham	794	(England) Wayne Larkins			1993
Most runs in a career for Durham	unknown				
Source: CricketArchive. Last updated: 19 May 2007.

== Bowling Records ==
	Analysis	Bowler	Opponents	Venue	Season
Best innings analysis for Durham	7/32	(Australia) Simon Davis	v Lancashire	Chester-le-Street²	1983
	Wickets	Bowler	Season		
Most wickets in a season for Durham	43	(England) Neil Killeen	2002		
Most career wickets for Durham		unknown			
Source: CricketArchive. Last updated: 19 May 2007. Notes: ² Ropery Lane Ground, Chester-le-Street

== Partnership Records ==
Wicket Partnership	Runs	Batsmen	Opponents	Venue	Season
1st	255	(England) Mike Roseberry (England) Stewart Hutton	v Herefordshire	Chester-le-Street¹	1995
2nd	167	(England) Mike Roseberry (England) John Morris	v Leicestershire	Leicester	1996
3rd	177	(England) Jimmy Daley (England) Paul Collingwood	v Surrey	Cardiff	2000
4th	166	(England) Stewart Hutton (England) Phil Bainbridge	v Wiltshire	Trowbridge	1993
5th	115	(England) Jimmy Daley (England) Jonathan Lewis	v Middlesex	Chester-le-Street¹	1999
6th	94	(Cricket West Indies) Gareth Breese (England) Andrew Pratt	v Derbyshire	Derby	2004
7th	107	(Cricket West Indies) Anderson Cummins (England) Christopher Scott	v Surrey	Darlington	1994
8th	58*	(England) Michael Gough (England) Graeme Bridge	v Lancashire	Chester-le-Street¹	2002
9th	62*	(England) Graeme Bridge (England) Mark Davies	v Leicestershire	Leicester	2002
10th	77	(South Africa) Dale Benkenstein (England) Neil Killeen	v Warwickshire	Chester-le-Street¹	2005
Source: CricketArchive. Last updated: 15 May 2007. Notes: ¹ Riverside Ground, Chester-le-Street
