= List of Essex List A cricket records =

This is a list of Essex List A cricket records; that is, record team and individual performances in List A cricket for Essex. Records for Essex in first-class cricket, the longer form of the game, are found at List of Essex first-class cricket records.

== Notation ==
Team notation: When a team score is listed as "300-3", this indicates that they have scored 300 runs for the loss of 3 wickets. If it is followed by a "d", this indicates that the side declared. When the team score is listed as "300", this means the side was all out.

Batting notation: When a batsman's score is listed as "100", the batsman scored 100 runs and was out. If it followed by an asterisk *, the batsman was not out.

Bowling notation: "5/100" indicates that the bowler took 5 wickets while conceding 100 runs.

Partnership notation: When partnership runs is listed as “100”, the partnership added 100 runs and was completed. If it is followed by an asterisk *, the partnership was unbroken (ie both batsmen not dismissed)

== Playing record ==
Opposition	Matches	Won	Lost	Tied	No Result	Abandoned	% Won
Derbyshire	47	31	13	0	3	3	65.96
Durham	19	10	7	2	0	1	52.63
Glamorgan	64	36	22	1	5	4	56.25
Gloucestershire	62	33	24	1	4	3	52.23
Hampshire	73	33	37	0	3	2	45.21
Kent	69	34	32	2	1	2	49.28
Lancashire	64	32	25	1	6	4	50.00
Leicestershire	46	21	21	2	2	5	45.65
Middlesex	74	44	25	3	2	5	59.46
Northamptonshire	53	34	16	1	2	1	64.15
Nottinghamshire	48	25	21	0	2	6	52.08
Somerset	48	24	22	1	1	3	50.00
Surrey	72	30	37	0	5	3	41.67
Sussex	65	43	19	1	2	4	66.15
Warwickshire	55	29	26	0	0	1	52.73
Worcestershire	54	25	28	1	0	2	46.30
Yorkshire	51	26	25	0	0	3	50.98
Bedfordshire	1	1	0	0	0	0	100.00
Berkshire	1	1	0	0	0	0	100.00
Buckinghamshire	1	1	0	0	0	0	100.00
Cambridgeshire	1	1	0	0	0	0	100.00
Cheshire	2	2	0	0	0	0	100.00
Cumberland	1	1	0	0	0	0	100.00
Devon	3	3	0	0	0	0	100.00
Dorset	1	1	0	0	0	0	100.00
Hertfordshire	1	1	1	0	0	0	50.00
Northumberland	2	2	0	1	0	0	100.00
Oxfordshire	1	1	0	0	0	0	100.00
Shropshire	1	1	0	0	0	0	100.00
Staffordshire	1	1	0	0	0	0	100.00
Suffolk	1	1	0	0	0	0	100.00
Wales Minor Counties	1	1	0	0	0	0	100.00
Wiltshire	2	2	0	0	0	0	100.00
British Universities	1	1	0	0	0	0	100.00
Cambridge University	1	1	0	0	0	0	100.00
Combined Universities	6	6	0	0	0	0	100.00
Essex Cricket Board	1	1	0	0	0	0	100.00
Ireland	3	3	0	0	0	1	100.00
Minor Counties	2	2	0	0	0	0	100.00
Minor Counties East	2	2	0	0	0	0	100.00
Minor Counties South	1	1	0	0	0	0	100.00
Netherlands	4	3	1	0	0	0	75.00
Scotland	8	8	0	0	0	0	100.00
Unicorns	2	2	0	0	0	0	100.00
Australians	1	0	1	0	0	0	0.00
Barbados	1	1	0	0	0	0	100.00
New Zealanders	1	0	1	0	0	0	0.00
Pakistanis	1	1	0	0	0	0	100.00
South Africa A	1	0	1	0	0	0	0.00
South Africans	1	0	1	0	0	0	0.00
Sri Lankans	3	2	1	0	0	0	66.67
West Indians	2	1	1	0	0	0	50.00
Victoria	1	0	1	0	0	0	0.00
Zimbabweans	3	1	2	0	0	0	33.33
Total	1032	567	411	16	38	53	54.94
Source: CricketArchive. Abandoned matches are not included in the total number of matches. Last updated: 14 August 2024.

== Team records ==
	Total Runs	Opponents	Venue	Season
Highest for Essex	417-6	v Surrey	Chelmsford	2025
Highest against Essex	373-5	by Notts	Chelmsford	2017
Lowest for Essex	57	v Lancashire	Lord's	1996
Lowest against Essex	41	by Middlesex	Westcliff-on-Sea	1972
	41	by Shropshire	Orleton Park	1974
Source: CricketArchive. Last updated: 15 August 2025.

== Batting records ==
	Runs	Batsman	Opponents	Venue	Season
Highest individual innings	201*	(England) Ravi Bopara	v Leicestershire	Grace Road	2008
Most runs in a season for Essex	1,169	(South Africa) Ken McEwan			1980
Most runs in a career for Essex	16,536	(England) Graham Gooch			1973–1997
Source: CricketArchive. Last updated: 14 August 2024.

== Bowling records ==
	Analysis	Bowler	Opponents	Venue	Season
Best innings analysis for Essex	8/26	(Cricket West Indies) Keith Boyce	v Lancashire	Manchester	1971
	Wickets	Bowler	Season		
Most wickets in a season for Essex	47	(England) John Lever	1976		
Most career wickets for Essex	616	(England) John Lever	1968–1989		
Source: CricketArchive. Last updated: 14 August 2024.

== Partnership records ==
Wicket Partnership	Runs	Batsmen	Opponents	Venue	Season
1st	269	(England) Mark Pettini (England) Jason Gallian	v Surrey	The Oval	2008
2nd	273	(England) Graham Gooch (South Africa) Ken McEwan	v Nottinghamshire	Nottingham	1983
3rd	268*	(England) Graham Gooch (England) Keith Fletcher	v Sussex	Hove	1982
4th	230	(New Zealand) Hamish Rutherford (Netherlands) Ryan ten Doeschate	v Scotland	Chelmsford	2013
5th	209	(England) Tom Westley (Netherlands) Ryan ten Doeschate	v Yorkshire	Scarborough	2014
6th	175	(Ireland) Curtis Campher (South Africa) Simon Harmer	v Surrey	Chelmsford	2025
7th	92	(England) Brian Edmeades (England) Stuart Turner	v Nottinghamshire	Chelmsford	1969
8th	109	(England) Ray East (England) Neil Smith	v Northamptonshire	Chelmsford	1977
9th	67	(England) Stuart Turner (England) Ray East	v Gloucestershire	Chelmsford	1973
10th	81	(England) Stuart Turner (England) Ray East	v Yorkshire	Leeds	1982
Source: CricketArchive. Last updated: 15 August 2025.
