= Indian cricket team in New Zealand in 2019–20 =

International cricket tour

	New Zealand	India
- Dates: 24 January – 4 March 2020
Captains	Kane Williamson (Note: Tim Southee captained New Zealand in the fourth and fifth T20Is. Tom Latham captained New Zealand in the first two ODIs.)	Virat Kohli (Note: Rohit Sharma captained India in the fifth T20I.)

Test series
- Result: New Zealand won the 2-match series 2–0
Most runs	Tom Latham (122)	Mayank Agarwal (102)
Most wickets	Tim Southee (14)	Jasprit Bumrah (6)
- Player of the series: Tim Southee (NZ)

One Day International series
- Results: New Zealand won the 3-match series 3–0
Most runs	Henry Nicholls (199)	Shreyas Iyer (217)
Most wickets	Hamish Bennett (6)	Yuzvendra Chahal (6)
- Player of the series: Ross Taylor (NZ)

Twenty20 International series
- Results: India won the 5-match series 5–0
Most runs	Colin Munro (178)	KL Rahul (224)
Most wickets	Ish Sodhi (6); Hamish Bennett (6)	Shardul Thakur (8)
- Player of the series: KL Rahul (Ind)

The India cricket team toured New Zealand from January to March 2020 to play two Tests, three One Day Internationals (ODIs) and five Twenty20 International (T20I) matches. The Test series formed part of the inaugural 2019–2021 ICC World Test Championship. New Zealand Cricket confirmed the fixtures for the tour in June 2019.

India won the first three T20I matches to give them an unassailable lead in the series. The third T20I was decided by a Super Over, after both teams made 179 runs from their twenty overs. This gave India their first T20I series win in New Zealand. Kane Williamson was ruled out of the fourth T20I with a shoulder injury, with Tim Southee named as New Zealand's captain in Williamson's absence. The fourth T20I was also tied, with India once again winning the match in the Super Over. India won the final T20I match to take the series 5–0, becoming the first side to whitewash another team in a five-match bilateral T20 series. Williamson's injury also ruled him out of the first two ODIs, with Tom Latham captaining the side.

New Zealand won the first two ODIs, therefore giving them an unassailable lead in the series. New Zealand won the third match by five wickets, to give them a 3–0 series win, and their first clean sweep against India in an ODI series with three or more matches. It was the first time that India was whitewashed in an ODI series since losing 5–0 to the West Indies in March 1989.

During the tour, New Zealand's Ross Taylor became the first cricketer to play in 100 matches in all three formats of international cricket. New Zealand won the first Test by ten wickets to record their 100th victory in Test match cricket. New Zealand won the second Test by seven wickets, taking the series 2–0, and extending their record of being undefeated at home to thirteen Test matches. It was the first time that India had been whitewashed in a Test series under Virat Kohli's captaincy.

== Squads ==
Tests		ODIs		T20Is	
New Zealand	India	New Zealand	India	New Zealand	India
Kane Williamson (c); Tom Blundell; Trent Boult; Colin de Grandhomme; Matt Henry; Kyle Jamieson; Tom Latham; Daryl Mitchell; Henry Nicholls; Ajaz Patel; Tim Southee; Ross Taylor; Neil Wagner; BJ Watling (wk)	Virat Kohli (c); Ajinkya Rahane (vc); Mayank Agarwal; Ravichandran Ashwin; Jasprit Bumrah; Shubman Gill; Ravindra Jadeja; Rishabh Pant (wk); Cheteshwar Pujara; Wriddhiman Saha (wk); Navdeep Saini; Prithvi Shaw; Mohammed Shami; Ishant Sharma; Hanuma Vihari; Umesh Yadav	Kane Williamson (c); Hamish Bennett; Tom Blundell; Mark Chapman; Colin de Grandhomme; Martin Guptill; Kyle Jamieson; Scott Kuggeleijn; Tom Latham; James Neesham; Henry Nicholls; Mitchell Santner; Ish Sodhi; Tim Southee; Ross Taylor; Blair Tickner	Virat Kohli (c); ~~Rohit Sharma (vc)~~; Mayank Agarwal; Jasprit Bumrah; Yuzvendra Chahal; Shivam Dube; Shreyas Iyer; Ravindra Jadeja; Kedar Jadhav; Manish Pandey; Rishabh Pant (wk); Prithvi Shaw; KL Rahul (wk); Navdeep Saini; Mohammed Shami; Shardul Thakur; Kuldeep Yadav	Kane Williamson (c); Hamish Bennett; Tom Bruce; Colin de Grandhomme; Martin Guptill; Scott Kuggeleijn; Daryl Mitchell; Colin Munro; Mitchell Santner; Tim Seifert (wk); Ish Sodhi; Tim Southee; Ross Taylor; Blair Tickner	Virat Kohli (c); Rohit Sharma (vc); Jasprit Bumrah; Yuzvendra Chahal; ~~Shikhar Dhawan~~; Shivam Dube; Shreyas Iyer; Ravindra Jadeja; Manish Pandey; Rishabh Pant (wk); KL Rahul (wk); Navdeep Saini; Sanju Samson; Mohammed Shami; Washington Sundar; Shardul Thakur; Kuldeep Yadav

Ahead of the tour Shikhar Dhawan was ruled out of India's squad, after he suffered a shoulder injury during the third ODI against Australia. Prithvi Shaw and Sanju Samson replaced Dhawan in India's ODI and T20I squads respectively. India's Rohit Sharma was ruled out of the rest of the series, after suffering a calf injury during the fifth and final T20I match. Mayank Agarwal was named as Sharma's replacement in India's ODI squad. New Zealand's Kane Williamson suffered an injury during the T20I series and was ruled out of the first two ODI matches, with Mark Chapman added to their squad. After several players in the New Zealand squad became ill, Ish Sodhi and Blair Tickner were called up to the team for the third ODI match. Prior to the Test series, Matt Henry was added to New Zealand's squad as cover for Neil Wagner, who was awaiting the birth of his first child.

== Tour match ==
=== Three-day match: New Zealand XI vs India ===
14–16 February 2020
Scorecard

India	v	New Zealand XI
263 (78.5 overs); Hanuma Vihari 101 (182); Scott Kuggeleijn 3/40 (14 overs)		235 (74.2 overs); Henry Cooper 40 (68); Mohammed Shami 3/17 (10 overs)
252/4 (48 overs); Mayank Agarwal 81 (99); Daryl Mitchell 3/33 (9 overs)

Match drawn
Seddon Park, Hamilton
Umpires: Damian Morrow (NZ) and Eugene Sanders (NZ)

- India won the toss and elected to bat.

== T20I series ==
=== 1st T20I ===
24 January 2020
19:50 (N)
Scorecard

New Zealand; 203/5 (20 overs)	v	India; 204/4 (19 overs)
Colin Munro 59 (42); Ravindra Jadeja 1/18 (2 overs)		Shreyas Iyer 58* (29); Ish Sodhi 2/36 (4 overs)

India won by 6 wickets
Eden Park, Auckland
Umpires: Chris Brown (NZ) and Shaun Haig (NZ)
Player of the match: Shreyas Iyer (Ind)

- India won the toss and elected to field.
- Hamish Bennett (NZ) made his T20I debut.
- Mitchell Santner (NZ) took his 50th wicket in T20Is.

=== 2nd T20I ===
26 January 2020
19:50 (N)
Scorecard

New Zealand; 132/5 (20 overs)	v	India; 135/3 (17.3 overs)
Martin Guptill 33 (20); Ravindra Jadeja 2/18 (4 overs)		KL Rahul 57* (50); Tim Southee 2/20 (3.3 overs)

India won by 7 wickets
Eden Park, Auckland
Umpires: Chris Brown (NZ) and Shaun Haig (NZ)
Player of the match: KL Rahul (Ind)

- New Zealand won the toss and elected to bat.

=== 3rd T20I ===
29 January 2020
20:00 (N)
Scorecard

India; 179/5 (20 overs)	v	New Zealand; 179/6 (20 overs)
Rohit Sharma 65 (40); Hamish Bennett 3/54 (4 overs)		Kane Williamson 95 (48); Shardul Thakur 2/21 (3 overs)

Match tied (India won the Super Over)
Seddon Park, Hamilton
Umpires: Chris Brown (NZ) and Shaun Haig (NZ)
Player of the match: Rohit Sharma (Ind)

- New Zealand won the toss and elected to field.
- Rohit Sharma (Ind) scored his 10,000th run across all three formats of international cricket as an opening batsman.
- Super Over: New Zealand 17/0, India 20/0

=== 4th T20I ===
31 January 2020
20:00 (N)
Scorecard

India; 165/8 (20 overs)	v	New Zealand; 165/7 (20 overs)
Manish Pandey 50* (36); Ish Sodhi 3/26 (4 overs)		Colin Munro 64 (47); Shardul Thakur 2/33 (4 overs)

Match tied (India won the Super Over)
Wellington Regional Stadium , Wellington
Umpires: Chris Brown (NZ) and Shaun Haig (NZ)
Player of the match: Shardul Thakur (Ind)

- New Zealand won the toss and elected to field.
- Super Over: New Zealand 13/1, India 16/1

=== 5th T20I ===
2 February 2020
20:00 (N)
Scorecard

India; 163/3 (20 overs)	v	New Zealand; 156/9 (20 overs)
Rohit Sharma 60* (41); Scott Kuggeleijn 2/25 (4 overs)		Ross Taylor 53 (47); Jasprit Bumrah 3/12 (4 overs)

India won by 7 runs
Bay Oval, Mount Maunganui
Umpires: Chris Brown (NZ) and Shaun Haig (NZ)
Player of the match: Jasprit Bumrah (Ind)

- India won the toss and elected to bat.
- Ross Taylor (NZ) became the third cricketer to play in 100 T20Is.
- Shivam Dube (Ind) bowled the second-most expensive over in a T20I match, conceding 34 runs.

== ODI series ==
=== 1st ODI ===
5 February 2020
15:00 (D/N)
Scorecard

India; 347/4 (50 overs)	v	New Zealand; 348/6 (48.1 overs)
Shreyas Iyer 103 (107); Tim Southee 2/85 (10 overs)		Ross Taylor 109* (84); Kuldeep Yadav 2/84 (10 overs)

New Zealand won by 4 wickets
Seddon Park, Hamilton
Umpires: Shaun Haig (NZ) and Langton Rusere (Zim)
Player of the match: Ross Taylor (NZ)

- New Zealand won the toss and elected to field.
- Tom Blundell (NZ), Mayank Agarwal and Prithvi Shaw (Ind) all made their ODI debuts.
- Shreyas Iyer (Ind) scored his first century in ODIs.
- This was New Zealand's highest target that was successfully chased in ODIs.

=== 2nd ODI ===
8 February 2020
15:00 (D/N)
Scorecard

New Zealand; 273/8 (50 overs)	v	India; 251 (48.3 overs)
Martin Guptill 79 (79); Yuzvendra Chahal 3/58 (10 overs)		Ravindra Jadeja 55 (73); Tim Southee 2/41 (10 overs)

New Zealand won by 22 runs
Eden Park, Auckland
Umpires: Chris Brown (NZ) and Bruce Oxenford (Aus)
Player of the match: Kyle Jamieson (NZ)

- India won the toss and elected to field.
- Kyle Jamieson (NZ) made his ODI debut.
- Kedar Jadhav played his last ODI.

=== 3rd ODI ===
11 February 2020
15:00 (D/N)
Scorecard

India; 296/7 (50 overs)	v	New Zealand; 300/5 (47.1 overs)
KL Rahul 112 (113); Hamish Bennett 4/64 (10 overs)		Henry Nicholls 80 (103); Yuzvendra Chahal 3/47 (10 overs)

New Zealand won by 5 wickets
Bay Oval, Mount Maunganui
Umpires: Chris Brown (NZ) and Langton Rusere (Zim)
Player of the match: Henry Nicholls (NZ)

- New Zealand won the toss and elected to field.
- Hamish Bennett (NZ) played in his last ODI.

== Test series ==
=== 1st Test ===
21–25 February 2020 (Note: While five days of play were scheduled for each Test, the first Test reached a result in four days and the second Test reached a result in three days.)
Scorecard

India	v	New Zealand
165 (68.1 overs); Ajinkya Rahane 46 (138); Kyle Jamieson 4/39 (16 overs)		348 (100.2 overs); Kane Williamson 89 (153); Ishant Sharma 5/68 (22.2 overs)
191 (81 overs); Mayank Agarwal 58 (99); Tim Southee 5/61 (21 overs)		9/0 (1.4 overs); Tom Latham 7* (4)

New Zealand won by 10 wickets
Basin Reserve, Wellington
Umpires: Aleem Dar (Pak) and Richard Kettleborough (Eng)
Player of the match: Tim Southee (NZ)

- New Zealand won the toss and elected to field.
- Kyle Jamieson (NZ) made his Test debut.
- Ross Taylor (NZ) played in his 100th Test.
- Tim Southee (NZ) took his tenth five-wicket haul in Tests.
- This was New Zealand's 100th win in Tests.
- World Test Championship points: New Zealand 60, India 0.

=== 2nd Test ===
29 February – 4 March 2020
Scorecard

India	v	New Zealand
242 (63 overs); Hanuma Vihari 55 (70); Kyle Jamieson 5/45 (14 overs)		235 (73.1 overs); Tom Latham 52 (122); Mohammed Shami 4/81 (23.1 overs)
124 (46 overs); Cheteshwar Pujara 24 (88); Trent Boult 4/28 (14 overs)		132/3 (36 overs); Tom Blundell 55 (113); Jasprit Bumrah 2/39 (13 overs)

New Zealand won by 7 wickets
Hagley Oval, Christchurch
Umpires: Michael Gough (Eng) and Richard Kettleborough (Eng)
Player of the match: Kyle Jamieson (NZ)

- New Zealand won the toss and elected to field.
- Kyle Jamieson (NZ) took his first five-wicket haul in Tests.
- World Test Championship points: New Zealand 60, India 0.
