= List of New Zealand Women's Twenty20 International cricket records =

This is a List of New Zealand Women's Twenty20 International cricket records, that is record team and individual performances in by the New Zealand women's national cricket team in Twenty20 International (T20I) cricket. This list is based on the List of Women's Twenty20 International records

== Key ==
The top ten records are listed for each category. Tied records for the tenth place are listed as well. Explanations of the general symbols and cricketing terms used in the list are given below. Specific details are provided in each category where appropriate.

Symbol	Meaning
‡	Player is currently active in WT20I cricket
*	Player remained not out or partnership remained unbroken
♠	World record

ICC Women's T20I Team Rankings
Team	Matches	Points	Rating
Australia	37	10,921	295
England	46	12,751	277
India	57	14,969	263
New Zealand	42	10,744	256
South Africa	48	11,750	245
West Indies	40	9,470	237
Sri Lanka	48	11,056	230
Pakistan	39	8,467	217
Ireland	48	9,494	198
Bangladesh	44	8,553	194
Scotland	37	5,909	160
Thailand	65	9,954	153
Papua New Guinea	38	5,484	144
Netherlands	51	6,947	136
United Arab Emirates	57	7,440	131
Zimbabwe	42	5,270	125
Uganda	70	7,877	113
Namibia	59	6,378	108
Tanzania	40	4,138	103
Indonesia	33	3,155	96
Nepal	53	4,956	94
United States	36	3,341	93
Hong Kong	59	5,327	90
Italy	41	3,449	84
Rwanda	69	5,772	84
Nigeria	39	2,946	76
Switzerland	12	863	72
Malaysia	45	3,119	69
Kenya	41	2,832	69
Canada	17	1,067	63
Jersey	30	1,870	62
Spain	17	1,049	62
Vanuatu	34	2,091	62
Brazil	40	2,273	57
Germany	33	1,850	56
Oman	24	1,214	51
Myanmar	34	1,577	46
Sweden	24	1,093	46
Isle of Man	30	1,312	44
Cyprus	23	977	42
Japan	33	1,377	42
Sierra Leone	32	1,322	41
Gibraltar	15	535	36
Guernsey	13	442	34
China	27	914	34
Denmark	27	895	33
Kuwait	27	848	31
Samoa	23	709	31
Bhutan	26	792	30
Botswana	43	1,289	30
Turkey	11	322	29
France	14	352	25
Romania	12	290	24
Croatia	10	237	24
Greece	31	726	23
Austria	32	639	20
Malawi	29	550	19
Argentina	19	322	17
Qatar	29	480	17
Estonia	23	376	16
Fiji	22	358	16
Serbia	17	246	14
Mozambique	28	404	14
Norway	24	342	14
Malta	17	200	12
Luxembourg	15	149	10
Cameroon	24	160	7
Singapore	45	166	4
Lesotho	17	50	3
Philippines	23	39	2
Cook Islands	14	6	0
Mongolia	20	0	0
Cambodia	10	0	0
Eswatini	17	0	0
Finland	9	0	0
Czech Republic	19	0	0
Bulgaria	19	0	0
Belgium	8	0	0
Bahrain	22	0	0
Source: ICC Women's T20I Team Rankings, 2 May 2026

== Team records ==
=== Team wins, losses, and ties ===
==== Matches played (total) ====
Mat	Won	Lost	Tied	NR	Win %
121	73	45	2	1	61.66
Note: Win percentage excludes no result matches and counts ties as half wins i.e. [won÷(matches – noresult)×100]. Source: Cricinfo. Last updated: 24 February 2020.

==== Matches played (by country) ====
Team	First Match	Mat	Won	Lost	Tied	NR	Win %
Australia	1973	123	31	90	0	2	25.61
Denmark	1993	1	1	0	0	0	100.00
England	1973	70	34	34	1	1	50.00
India	1978	48	28	19	1	0	59.37
International XI	1973	4	3	1	0	0	75.00
Ireland	1988	20	18	0	0	2	100.00
Netherlands	1984	9	9	0	0	0	100.00
Pakistan	1997	13	12	1	0	0	92.30
South Africa	1999	13	11	2	0	0	84.61
Sri Lanka	1997	10	10	0	0	0	100.00
Trinidad and Tobago	1973	1	1	0	0	0	100.00
West Indies	1993	19	11	7	0	1	61.11
Young England	1973	1	1	0	0	0	100.00
Source: Cricinfo. Last updated: 6 February 2019.

== Individual records ==
=== Individual records (batting) ===
==== Most career runs ====
Runs	Batter	Innings	Average	T20I career span
3208 ♠	Suzie Bates‡	113	30.84	2007–present
2327	Sophie Devine ‡	85	31.87	2006–present
1526	Amy Satterthwaite	89	21.19	2007-2019
1164	Sara McGlashan	73	18.18	2004-2016
819	Rachel Priest‡	61	16.71	2007–present
Source: Cricinfo. Last updated: February 24, 2020.

=== Individual records (bowling) ===
==== Most career wickets ====
Wickets	Bowler	Matches	Bowling average	T20I career span
84	Sophie Devine‡	87	16.82	2006–present
60	Leigh Kasperek‡	36	13.11	2015–present
49	Suzie Bates‡	115	25.46	2007–present
47	Nicola Browne	54	17.31	2002-2014
46	Lea Tahuhu‡	53	21.15	2011–present
Source: Cricinfo. Last updated: February 22, 2020.

== See also ==
- List of Women's Twenty20 International records
- List of New Zealand Women's One Day International cricket records
