= List of Durham first-class cricket records =

This is a list of Durham first-class cricket records; that is, record team and individual performances in first-class cricket for Durham. Records for Durham in List A cricket, the shorter form of the game, are found at List of Durham List A cricket records.

== Notation ==
Team Notation: When a team score is listed as "300-3", this indicates that they have scored 300 runs for the loss of 3 wickets. If it is followed by a "d", this indicates that the side declared. When the team score is listed as "300", this means the side was all out.

Batting Notation: When a batsman's score is listed as "100", the batsman scored 100 runs and was out. If it followed by an asterisk *, the batsman was not out.

Bowling Notation: "5/100" indicates that the bowler took 5 wickets while conceding 100 runs.

== Team Records ==
	Total Runs	Opponents	Venue	Season
Highest for Durham	664	v Nottinghamshire	Chester-le-Street	2025
Highest against Durham	810-4 d	by Warwickshire	Birmingham	1994
Lowest for Durham	61	v Leicestershire	Grace Road	2018
Lowest against Durham	18	by Durham MCCU	Chester-le-Street	2012
Source: CricketArchive. Durham MCCU are one of six Marylebone Cricket Club Universities accorded first-class status. Last updated: 9 April 2012.

== Batting Records ==
	Runs	Batsman	Opponents	Venue	Season
Highest individual innings	279	(South Africa) David Bedingham	v Lancashire	Chester-le-Street	2024
Most runs in a season for Durham	1,654	(Australia) Michael Di Venuto			2009
Most runs in a career for Durham	15,057	(England) Paul Collingwood			1996–2015
Source: CricketArchive. Last updated: 17 October 2009.

== Bowling Records ==
	Analysis	Bowler	Opponents	Venue	Season
Best innings analysis for Durham	10/47	(Cricket West Indies) Ottis Gibson	v Hampshire	Chester-Le-Street	2007
Best match analysis for Durham	15/95	(England) Chris Rushworth	v Northamptonshire	Chester-le-Street	2014
	Wickets	Bowler	Season		
Most wickets in a season for Durham	80	(Cricket West Indies) Ottis Gibson	2007		
Most career wickets for Durham	751	(England) Chris Rushworth	2010–2022		
Source: CricketArchive. Last updated: 17 May 2007.

== Partnership Records ==
Wicket Partnership	Runs	Batsmen	Opponents	Venue	Season
1st	334*	(England) Stewart Hutton (England) Mike Roseberry	v Oxford University	Oxford	1996
2nd	274	(England) Mark Stoneman (England) Scott Borthwick	v Middlesex	Chester-le-Street	2014
3rd	205	(England) Graeme Fowler (England) Stewart Hutton	v Yorkshire	Leeds	1993
4th	331	(England) Ben Stokes (South Africa) Dale Benkenstein	v Lancashire	Chester-le-Street	2011
5th	425	(South Africa) David Bedingham (Netherlands) Colin Ackermann	v Lancashire	Chester-le-Street	2024
6th	282	(England) Cameron Bancroft (England) Ned Eckersley	v Sussex	Hove	2019
7th	315	(South Africa) Dale Benkenstein (Cricket West Indies) Ottis Gibson	v Yorkshire	Leeds	2006
8th	147	(England) Phil Mustard (England) Liam Plunkett	v Yorkshire	Leeds	2009
9th	149	(England) Liam Trevaskis (England) Matty Potts	v Northants	Northamptonshire	2021
10th	158	(England) Ben Raine (England) Callum Parkinson	v Kent	Beckenham	2026
Source: CricketArchive. Last updated: 10 September 2009
