= List of Northamptonshire List A cricket records =

This is a list of Northamptonshire's List A cricket records; that is, record team and individual performances in List A cricket for Northamptonshire County Cricket Club.

Most List A runs for Northamptonshire

Qualification - 6000 runs

Player	Runs
Rob Bailey	11,010
Allan Lamb	10,207
Wayne Larkins	9612
Geoff Cook	8257
David Sales	7041
David Capel	6274

Most List A wickets for Northamptonshire

Qualification - 130 wickets

Player	Wickets
David Capel	237
Paul Taylor	236
Kevin Curran	164
Neil Mallender	164
Nick Cook	155
Jason Brown	136

Team totals

Record	Score	Opposition	Venue	Year	Link
Highest Total For	425	Nottinghamshire	Trent Bridge	2016	
Highest Total Against	445-8	Nottinghamshire	Trent Bridge	2016	
Lowest Total For	41	Middlesex	Northampton	1972	
Lowest Total Against	56	Leicestershire	Leicester	1964	

Batting

	Player	Information
Highest score	1. Prithvi Shaw; 2. Wayne Larkins; 3. David Willey	244 v Somerset at County Ground, Northampton in 2023; 172* v Warwickshire at Wardown Park, Luton in 1983; 167 v Warwickshire at Edgbaston, Birmingham in 2013
Most runs in season	1. Alan Fordham; 2. Allan Lamb; 3. Wayne Larkins	980 in 1991; 939 in 1987; 936 in 1982

Record partnership for each wicket

Wicket	Score	Batting partners	Opposition	Venue	Year	Link
1st	232	RR Montgomerie & A Fordham	Nottinghamshire	Trent Bridge	1995	
2nd	245	G Cook & RJ Bailey	Gloucestershire	Northampton	1987	
3rd	222	SA Zaib & WA Young	Essex	Northampton	2022	
4th	215	DJG Sales & CJL Rogers	Yorkshire	Northampton	2006	
5th	161	LD McManus & TAI Taylor	Derbyshire	Northampton	2022	
6th	167*	DJG Sales & JN Snape	Sri Lanka	Northampton	1998	
7th	115	DJG Sales & N Boje	Derbyshire	Northampton	2008	
8th	112	AL Penberthy & JE Emburey	Lancashire	Old Trafford	1996	
9th	106	TAI Taylor & CJ White	Gloucestershire	Cheltenham	2023	
10th	49	RK Kleinveldt & M Azharullah	Surrey	Northampton	2016	

Bowling

	Player	Information
Best bowling (innings)	1. Charl Pietersen; 2. Neil Mallender; 3. Alan Hodgson	7-10 v Denmark at Svanholm Park, Brøndby in 2005; 7-37 v Worcestershire at County Ground, Northampton in 1984; 7-39 v Somerset at County Ground, Northampton in 1976
Most wickets in season	1. Paul Taylor; 2. Johann Louw; 3. Sarfraz Nawaz	43 in 1996; 37 in 2004; 34 in 1976

Wicket-keeping

	Player	Information
Most victims in innings	1. George Sharp; 2. Toby Bailey	5 v Middlesex at Lord's, London in 1974; 5 v Middlesex at County Ground, Northampton in 2002
Most victims in season	1. Toby Bailey; 2. Russell Warren	37 in 2002; 32 in 1995
