= Toby Bailey (cricketer) =

English cricketer (born 1976)

Personal information
- Full name: Tobin Michael Barnaby Bailey
- Born: 28 August 1976 (age 50); Kettering, England
- Batting: Right-handed
- Role: Wicketkeeper

Domestic team information
- Years: Team
- 1994–1996: Bedfordshire
- 1996–2004: Northamptonshire

Career statistics
Competition	FC	LA	T20
Matches	52	73	5
Runs scored	1,324	667	1
Batting average	22.44	21.51	–
100s/50s	1/6	0/1	0/0
Top score	101*	52	1*
Catches/stumpings	97/18	73/30	0/5
- Source: Cricinfo, 7 November 2009

Tobin Michael Barnaby Bailey (born 28 August 1976) is a former English cricketer who played for Northamptonshire between 1996 and 2004. He was a wicket-keeper.

== Cricket career ==
For most of his early career with Northamptonshire, Bailey was the understudy to the long-serving wicket-keeper David Ripley. When Ripley retired in 2001, Bailey took over for three years until Gerard Brophy arrived in 2004 and took his place because of his superior batting. Bailey was released at the end of that season.

During his time at Northants, he was involved in a bust-up with team-mate Russell Warren, after Warren started dating Bailey's fiancée. Warren was eventually forced out of the club after protests from other members of the team.

Bailey captained an MCC team that toured Mozambique in February 2009, playing six one-day matches.

Bailey has an ECB level 3 coaching certificate and is the former coach of the Argentinian cricket team He now coaches Scottish club side Carlton CC. He was acting coach of the Scotland national cricket team from September 2018 to January 2019.
