= List of Hampshire County Cricket Club first-class cricket records =

Established in 1863, Hampshire County Cricket Club has played first-class cricket from 1864 to 1885 and from 1895 to present. It has taken part in every edition County Championship since 1895. This is a list of Hampshire first-class cricket records; that is, record team and individual performances in first-class cricket for Hampshire County Cricket Club.

== Team ==
- Highest Total For: 714/5d v Nottinghamshire at the Rose Bowl, Southampton, 2005
- Highest Total Against: 742 by Surrey at The Oval, 1909
- Lowest Total For: 15 v Warwickshire at Edgbaston, Birmingham, 1922
- Lowest Total Against: 23 by Yorkshire at Acklam Park, Middlesbrough, 1965

== Batting ==
- Highest Score: 316 Dick Moore v Warwickshire, Dean Park, Bournemouth 1937
- Most Runs in Season: 2,854 Phil Mead, 1928

=== Most first-class runs for Hampshire ===
Qualification - 19,000 runs

Player	Nationality	Runs
Phil Mead	England	48,892
Roy Marshall	Barbados	30,303
George Brown	England	22,962
Jimmy Gray	England	22,450
John Arnold	England	21,596
Henry Horton	England	21,536
Gordon Greenidge	Barbados	19,840
Peter Sainsbury	England	19,576

=== Highest Partnership for each wicket ===
Correct as of 27 September 2026.

Wkt	Runs	Partnership	Opponent	Ground	Season
1st	347	Paul Terry & Chris Smith	Warwickshire	Edgbaston, Birmingham	1987
2nd	373	James Adams & Michael Carberry	Somerset	County Ground, Taunton	2011
3rd	523	Michael Carberry & Neil McKenzie	Yorkshire	Rose Bowl, Southampton	2011
4th	367	James Adams & Sean Ervine	Warwickshire	Rose Bowl, Southampton	2017
5th	273	Liam Dawson & Ben Brown	Kent	St Lawrence Ground, Canterbury	2022
6th	411	Robert Poore & Teddy Wynyard	Somerset	County Ground, Taunton	1899
7th	325	George Brown & Cecil Abercrombie	Essex	County Ground, Leyton	1913
8th	257	Nic Pothas & Andy Bichel	Gloucestershire	College Ground, Cheltenham	2005
9th	230	Danny Livingstone & Alan Castell	Surrey	County Ground, Southampton	1962
10th	192	Alex Bowell & Walter Livsey	Worcestershire	Dean Park, Bournemouth	1921
11th	13	Henry Harris & Frederick Jellicoe	Marylebone Cricket Club	Days (Antelope) Ground, Southampton	1880

== Bowling ==
- Best Bowling: 9/25 Bob Cottam v Lancashire at Old Trafford, Manchester, 1965
- Best Match Bowling: 17/86 Kyle Abbott v Somerset at Ageas Bowl, Southampton, 2019
- Wickets in Season: 190, Alec Kennedy, 1922

=== Most first-class wickets for Hampshire ===
Qualification - 1000 wickets

Player	Nationality	Wickets
Derek Shackleton	England	2,669
Alex Kennedy	England	2,549
Jack Newman	England	1,946
Stuart Boyes	England	1,415
Peter Sainsbury	England	1,245
Butch White	England	1,097
Lofty Herman	England	1,041

== Wicket-keeping ==
- Most catches in a season: 76 Leo Harrison, 1959
- Most stumpings in a season: 32 Walter Livsey, 1921

=== Most victims for Hampshire ===
Qualification - 350 victims

Player	Nationality	Catches	Stumpings	Total
Bobby Parks	England	630	70	700
Neil McCorkell	England	500	177	677
Bob Stephenson	England	570	75	645
Walter Livsey	England	371	255	626
Leo Harrison	England	511	95	606
Adrian Aymes	England	515	44	559
Jimmy Stone	England	355	114	469
Brian Timms	England	402	60	462
Nic Pothas	South Africa	375	23	398

== See also ==
- List of Hampshire CCC List A cricket records
- List of Hampshire CCC Twenty20 cricket records
