= List of Essex first-class cricket records =

This is a list of Essex first-class cricket records; that is, record team and individual performances in first-class cricket for Essex. Records for Essex in List A cricket, the shorter form of the game, are found at List of Essex List A cricket records.

== Notation ==
Team notation: When a team score is listed as "300-3", this indicates that they have scored 300 runs for the loss of 3 wickets. If it is followed by a "d", this indicates that the side declared. When the team score is listed as "300", this means the side was all out.

Batting notation: When a batsman's score is listed as "100", the batsman scored 100 runs and was out. If it followed by an asterisk *, the batsman was not out.

Bowling notation: "5/100" indicates that the bowler took 5 wickets while conceding 100 runs.

Partnership notation: When partnership runs is listed as “100”, the partnership added 100 runs and was completed. If it is followed by an asterisk *, the partnership was unbroken (ie both batsmen not dismissed)

== Playing record ==
Opposition	Matches	Won	Lost	Drawn	Tied	Abandoned	% Won
Derbyshire	183	79	31	73	0	1	43.16
Durham	20	10	3	7	0	0	50
Glamorgan	139	46	27	66	0	1	33.09
Gloucestershire	147	49	50	47	1	2	33.33
Hampshire	152	54	39	59	0	2	35.53
Kent	197	55	66	76	0	3	27.92
Lancashire	161	34	52	74	1	3	21.12
Leicestershire	173	51	41	81	0	2	29.48
Middlesex	174	41	55	78	0	2	25.29
Northamptonshire	179	56	44	78	1	2	31.28
Nottinghamshire	142	39	34	69	0	0	27.46
Somerset	151	60	37	53	1	3	39.74
Surrey	202	45	75	82	0	4	22.28
Sussex	156	49	40	66	1	0	31.41
Warwickshire	128	42	36	49	1	1	32.81
Worcestershire	153	48	35	70	0	0	32
Yorkshire	169	29	87	53	0	4	17.16
Australian Imperial Forces	2	0	2	0	0	0	0
Australians	31	3	15	13	0	0	9.67
Bangladeshis	1	1	0	0	0	0	100
Cambridge Marylebone Cricket Club University	7	3	0	4	0	0	42.86
Cambridge University	61	22	3	36	0	0	36.07
Cambridge University Centre of Cricketing Excellence	8	4	0	4	0	0	50
Canadians	1	0	0	1	0	0	0
Combined Services	2	1	0	1	0	0	50
Commonwealth XI	1	1	0	0	0	0	100
Dublin University	1	0	0	1	0	0	0
Durham Marylebone Cricket Club University	1	0	0	1	0	0	0
England A	2	1	0	1	0	0	50
Indians	11	2	1	8	0	0	18.18
Ireland	1	0	1	0	0	0	0
Jamaica	1	0	0	1	0	0	0
Loughborough University Centre of Cricketing Excellence	1	0	0	1	0	0	0
Marylebone Cricket Club	11	2	4	5	0	1	18.18
New Zealanders	14	3	7	4	0	0	21.43
Oxford University	18	8	3	7	0	1	44.44
Pakistanis	7	1	3	3	0	0	14.29
South Africa Fezelas	1	0	1	0	0	0	0
South Africans	12	1	6	5	0	0	8.33
Sri Lanka A	1	0	0	1	0	0	0
Sri Lankans	2	0	0	2	0	0	0
TN Pearce's XI	1	0	1	0	0	0	0
Victoria	1	0	0	1	0	0	0
West Indians	17	1	6	10	0	0	5.88
Zimbabweans	1	0	0	1	0	0	0
Total	2844	841	805	1192	6	32	29.57
Source: CricketArchive. Abandoned matches are not included in the total number of matches. Last updated: 14 April 2025.

== Team records ==
	Total Runs	Opponents	Venue	Season
Highest for Essex	761-6 d	v Leicestershire	Chelmsford	1990
Highest against Essex	803-4 d	by Kent	Brentwood	1934
Lowest for Essex	20	v Lancashire	Chelmsford	2013
Lowest against Essex	14	by Surrey	Chelmsford	1983
Source: CricketArchive. Last updated: 26 September 2024.

== Batting records ==
	Runs	Batsman	Opponents	Venue	Season
Highest individual innings	343*	(England) Percy Perrin	v Derbyshire	Chesterfield	1904
Most runs in a season for Essex	2,559	(England) Graham Gooch			1984
Most runs in a career for Essex	30,701	(England) Graham Gooch			1973 - 1997
Source: CricketArchive. Last updated: 26 September 2024.

== Bowling records ==
	Analysis	Bowler	Opponents	Venue	Season
Best innings analysis for Essex	10/32	(England) Harry Pickett	v Leicestershire	Leyton	1895
Best match analysis for Essex	17/119	(England) Walter Mead	v Hampshire	Southampton	1895
	Wickets	Bowler	Season		
Most wickets in a season for Essex	172	(England) Peter Smith	1947		
Most career wickets for Essex	1,610	(England) Peter Smith	1929 - 1951		
Source: CricketArchive. Last updated: 26 September 2024.

== Partnership records ==
Wicket Partnership	Runs	Batsmen	Opponents	Venue	Season
1st	373	(England) Nick Browne (England) Alastair Cook	v Middlesex	Chelmsford	2017
2nd	403	(England) Graham Gooch (England) Paul Prichard	v Leicestershire	Chelmsford	1990
3rd	347*	(Australia) Mark Waugh (England) Nasser Hussain	v Lancashire	Ilford	1992
4th	314	(Pakistan) Saleem Malik (England) Nasser Hussain	v Surrey	The Oval	1991
5th	339	(England) James Foster (England) Jaik Mickleburgh	v Durham	Chester-le-Street	2010
6th	253	(England) Adam Wheater (England) James Foster	v Northants	Chelmsford	2011
7th	261	(England) Johnny Douglas (England) John Freeman	v Lancashire	Leyton	1914
8th	263	(England) Denys Wilcox (England) Reginald Taylor	v Warwickshire	Southend-on-Sea	1946
9th	251	(England) Johnny Douglas (England) Steriker Hare	v Derbyshire	Leyton	1921
10th	218	(England) Frank Vigar (England) Peter Smith	v Derbyshire	Chesterfield	1947
Source: CricketArchive. Last updated: 26 September 2024
