= List of Hampshire County Cricket Club List A cricket records =

Established in 1863, Hampshire County Cricket Club has played List A cricket since 1963 to the present day. This is a list of Hampshire List A cricket records; that is, record team and individual performances in List A cricket for Hampshire County Cricket Club.

== Team ==
- Highest Total For: 396/5 v Kent at County Cricket Ground, Beckenham, 2022
- Highest Total Against: 360/7 by Somerset at Ageas Bowl, Southampton, 2018
- Lowest Total For: 43 v Essex at May's Bounty, Basingstoke, 1972
- Lowest Total Against: 61 by Somerset at Recreation Ground, Bath, 1973

== Batting ==
- Highest Score: 190 James Vince v Gloucestershire, Ageas Bowl, Southampton, 2019
- Most Runs in Season: 1,004 Chris Smith, 1991

=== Most List A runs for Hampshire ===
Qualification - 6,000 runs

Player	Nationality	Runs
Robin Smith	England	12,034
David Turner	England	9,835
Gordon Greenidge	Barbados	9,801
Paul Terry	England	8,622
Mark Nicholas	England	6,983
Trevor Jesty	England	6,859
Barry Richards	South Africa	6,708
Chris Smith	England	6,301

=== Highest Partnership for each wicket ===
Correct as of the end of the 2026 One-Day Cup

Wkt	Runs	Partnership	Opponent	Ground	Season
1st	269	John Stephenson & Jason Laney	Norfolk	County Ground, Southampton	1996
2nd	285*	Gordon Greenidge & David Turner	Minor Counties South	Shardeloes, Amersham	1973
3rd	260*	Sean Ervine & Michael Carberry	Ireland	Rose Bowl, Southampton	2009
4th	221	James Vince & Liam Dawson	Glamorgan	Ageas Bowl, Southampton	2017
5th	186	James Vince & Liam Dawson	Gloucestershire	Ageas Bowl, Southampton	2019
6th	177*	Chris Benham & Nic Pothas	Leicestershire	Rose Bowl, Southampton	2009
7th	137*	Michael Brown & Dimitri Mascarenhas	Worcestershire	Rose Bowl, Southampton	2008
8th	152	George Bailey & Kyle Abbott	Surrey	The Oval, London	2017
9th=	64	Adam Wheater & Chris Wood	Essex	Ageas Bowl, Southampton	2013
9th=	64*	James Fuller & Mason Crane	Somerset	Lord's, London	2019
9th=	64	Andrew Neal & Kyle Abbott	Derbyshire	Utilita Bowl, Southampton	2013
10th	61	John Rice & Andy Roberts	Gloucestershire	County Ground, Bristol	1975

== Bowling ==
- Best bowling: 7/15 Liam Dawson v Warwickshire at Edgbaston, 2023
- Wickets in season: 51, Shaun Udal, 1992

=== Most List A wickets for Hampshire ===
Qualification - 200 wickets

Player	Nationality	Wickets
Cardigan Connor	(Anguilla) Leeward Islands	411
Shaun Udal	England	407
Trevor Jesty	England	334
Dimitri Mascarenhas	England	285
Tim Tremlett	England	252
Malcolm Marshall	Barbados	239
Nigel Cowley	England	233
Kevan James	England	223
Peter Sainsbury	England	202

== See also ==
- List of Hampshire CCC first-class cricket records
- List of Hampshire CCC Twenty20 cricket records
