= List of New Zealand One Day International cricket records =

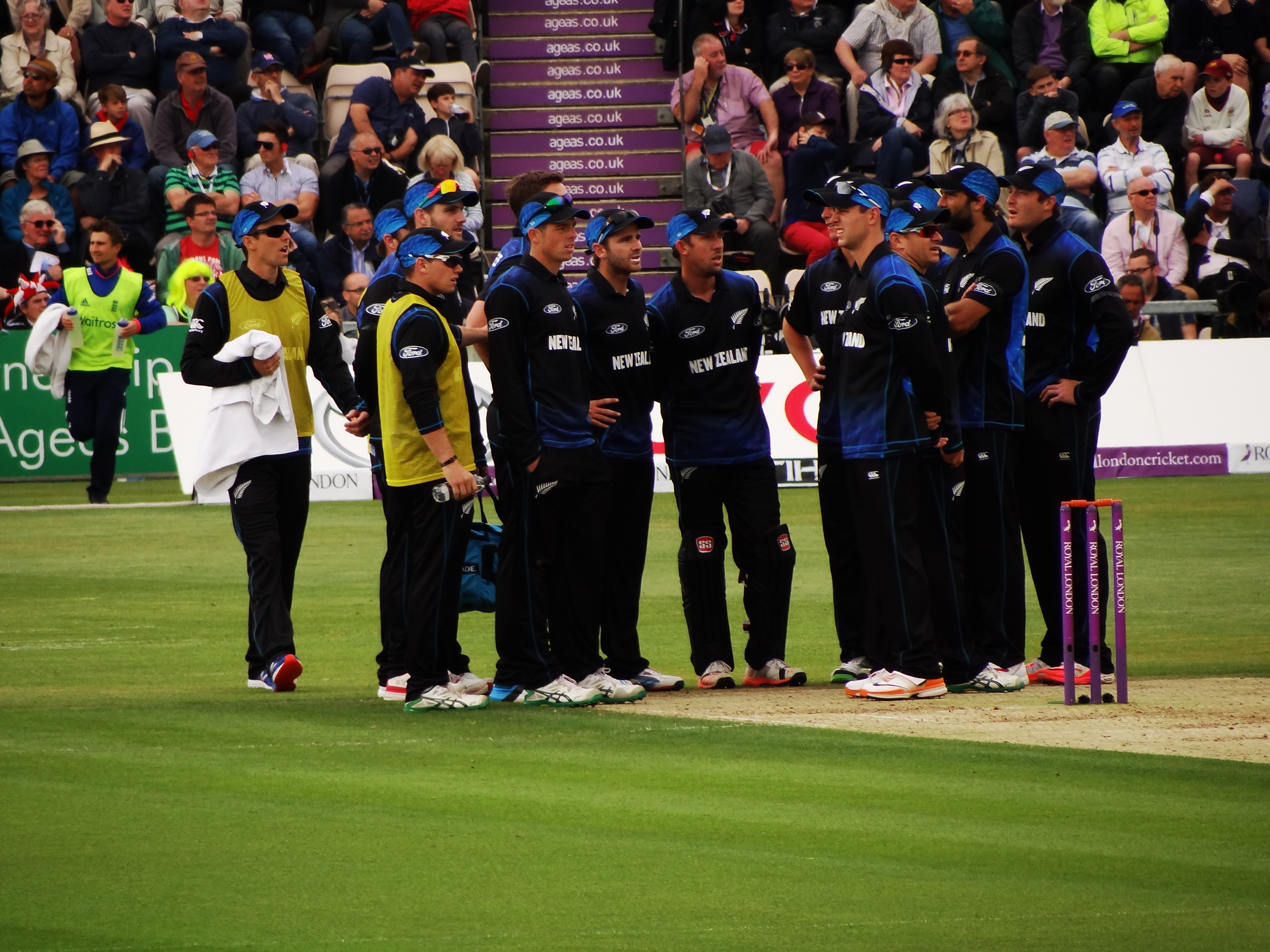
New Zealand fielding in the 3rd ODI of their 2015 tour to England. A match where Kane Williamson and Ross Taylor scored the highest 3rd wicket partnership for New Zealand, leading the team to one of their highest successful chases.

One Day International (ODI) cricket is played between international cricket teams who are Full Members of the International Cricket Council (ICC) as well as the top four Associate members. Unlike Test matches, ODIs consist of one inning per team, having a limit in the number of overs, currently 50 overs per innings – although in the past this has been 55 or 60 overs. ODI cricket is List-A cricket, so statistics and records set in ODI matches also count toward List-A records. The earliest match recognised as an ODI was played between England and Australia in January 1971; since when there have been over 4,000 ODIs played by 28 teams. This is a list of New Zealand Cricket team's One Day International records. It is based on the List of One Day International cricket records, but concentrates solely on records dealing with the New Zealand cricket team. New Zealand played its first ever ODI in 1973.

== Key ==
The top five records are listed for each category, except for the team wins, losses, draws and ties, all round records and the partnership records. Tied records for fifth place are also included. Explanations of the general symbols and cricketing terms used in the list are given below. Specific details are provided in each category where appropriate. All records include matches played for New Zealand only, and are correct as of March 2021.

Key
Symbol	Meaning
†	Player or umpire is currently active in ODI cricket
‡	Even took place during a Cricket World Cup
*	Player remained not out or partnership remained unbroken
♠	One Day International cricket record
Date	Starting date of the match
Innings	Number of innings played
Matches	Number of matches played
Opposition	The team New Zealand was playing against
Period	The time period when the player was active in ODI cricket
Player	The player involved in the record
Venue	One Day International cricket ground where the match was played

== Team records ==
=== Overall Record ===
Matches	Won	Lost	Tied	NR	Win %
850	398	401	7	44	49.75
Last Updated: 21 January 2026

=== Team wins, losses, draws and ties ===
As of January 2026, New Zealand has played 850 ODI matches resulting in 398 victories, 401 defeats, 7 ties, 1 tie (plus defeat) and 44 no results for an overall winning percentage of 49.75

Opponent	Matches	Won	Lost	Tied	No Result	% Won	First	Last
Full Members
Afghanistan	3	3	0	0	0	100.00	2015	2023
Australia	142	39	96	0	7	27.46	1974	2023
Bangladesh	46	34	11	0	1	73.91	1990	2025
England	99	48	44	3	4	51.57	1973	2023
India	123	52	63	1	7	45.25	1975	2026
Ireland	7	7	0	0	0	100.00	2007	2022
Pakistan	122	57	61	1	3	48.31	1973	2025
South Africa	74	27	42	0	5	36.48	1992	2025
Sri Lanka	108	54	44	1	9	50.00	1979	2025
West Indies	71	33	31	0	7	51.56	1975	2022
Zimbabwe	38	27	9	1	1	74.32	1987	2015
Associate Members
Canada	3	3	0	0	0	100.00	2003	2011
East Africa	1	1	0	0	0	100.00	1975	1975
Kenya	2	2	0	0	0	100.00	2007	2011
Netherlands	5	5	0	0	0	100.00	1996	2023
Scotland	4	4	0	0	0	100.00	1999	2022
United Arab Emirates	1	1	0	0	0	100.00	1996	1996
United States	1	1	0	0	0	100.00	2004	2004
Total	850	398	401	7	44	49.75	1973	2026
Statistics are correct as of January 2026.

=== Team scoring records ===
==== Most runs in an innings ====
The highest innings total scored in ODIs came in the match between England and Australia in June 2018. Playing in the third ODI at Trent Bridge in Nottingham, the hosts posted a total of 481/6. The Only ODI against Ireland in July 2008 during 2008 tour of England saw New Zealand set their highest innings total of 402/2.

Rank	Score	Opposition	Venue	Date	Scorecard
1	402/2	Ireland	Mannofield Park, Aberdeen, Scotland	1 July 2008	Scorecard
2	401/6	Pakistan	M.Chinnaswamy Stadium, Bengaluru, India	4 November 2023	Scorecard
3	398/5	England	The Oval, London, England	12 June 2015	Scorecard
4	397/5	Zimbabwe	Queens Sports Club, Bulawayo, Zimbabwe	21 August 2005	Scorecard
5	393/6	West Indies	Westpac Stadium, Wellington, New Zealand	21 March 2015 ‡	Scorecard
Last updated: 1 July 2020

==== Fewest runs in an innings ====
The lowest innings total scored in ODIs has been scored twice. Zimbabwe were dismissed for 35 by Sri Lanka during the third ODI in Sri Lanka's tour of Zimbabwe in April 2004 and USA were dismissed for same score by Nepal in the sixth ODI of the 2020 ICC Cricket World League 2 in Nepal in February 2020. The lowest score in ODI history for New Zealand is 64 scored against Pakistan in the 1986 Austral-Asia Cup in Sharjah.

Rank	Score	Opposition	Venue	Date	Scorecard
1	64	Pakistan	Sharjah Cricket Stadium, Sharjah, United Arab Emirates	15 April 1986	Scorecard
2	73	Sri Lanka	Eden Park, Auckland, New Zealand	6 January 2007	Scorecard
3	74	Australia	Basin Reserve, Wellington, New Zealand	20 February 1982	Scorecard
3	74	Pakistan	Sharjah Cricket Stadium, Sharjah, United Arab Emirates	1 May 1990	Scorecard
5	79	India	APCA-VDCA Stadium, Visakhapatnam, India	29 October 2016	Scorecard
Last updated: 1 July 2020

==== Most runs conceded an innings ====
The first match of the 2015 tour of England saw New Zealand concede their highest innings total of 408/9.

Rank	Score	Opposition	Venue	Date	Scorecard
1	408/9	England	Edgbaston, Birmingham, England	9 June 2015	Scorecard
2	392/4	India	Lancaster Park, Christchurch, New Zealand	8 March 2009	Scorecard
3	388	Australia	HPCA Stadium, Dharamsala, India	29 October 2023	Scorecard
4	385/9	India	Holkar Stadium, Indore, India	24 January 2023	Scorecard
5	378/5	Australia	Manuka Oval, Canberra, Australia	6 December 2016	Scorecard
Last updated: 24 January 2023

==== Fewest runs conceded in an innings ====
The lowest score conceded by New Zealand for a full inning is 69 scored by Kenya in the 2011 Cricket World Cup.

Rank	Score	Opposition	Venue	Date	Scorecard
1	69	Kenya	M. A. Chidambaram Stadium, Chennai, India	20 February 2011 ‡	Scorecard
2	70	Australia	Adelaide Oval, Adelaide, Australia	27 January 1986	Scorecard
3	74	Pakistan	University Oval, Dunedin, New Zealand	13 January 2018	Scorecard
4	76	Sri Lanka	Eden Park, Auckland, New Zealand	25 March 2023	Scorecard
5	77	Bangladesh	Sinhalese Sports Club Ground, Colombo, Sri Lanka	23 September 2002	Scorecard
Last updated: 1 July 2020

==== Most runs aggregate in a match ====
The highest match aggregate scored in ODIs came in the match between South Africa and Australia in the fifth ODI of March 2006 series at Wanderers Stadium, Johannesburg when South Africa scored 438/9 in response to Australia's 434/4. In 2023 Cricket World Cup the highest aggregate score of 771 scored by a team which was involving with New Zealand was Australia.

Rank	Aggregate	Scores	Venue	Date	Scorecard
1	771/19	Australia (388) v New Zealand (383/9)	HPCA Stadium, Dharamsala, India	28 October 2023	Scorecard
2	763/14	New Zealand (398/5) v England (365/9)	The Oval, London, England	12 June 2015	Scorecard
3	726/14	India (392/4) v New Zealand (334)	Lancaster Park, Christchurch, New Zealand	8 March 2009	Scorecard
4	719/15	New Zealand (360/6) v Ireland (359/9)	The Village, Dublin, Ireland	15 July 2022	Scorecard
5	699/10	New Zealand (349/7) v England (350/3)	Trent Bridge, Nottingham, England	17 June 2015	Scorecard
Last updated: 22 August 2022

==== Fewest runs aggregate in a match ====
The lowest match aggregate in ODIs is 71 when USA were dismissed for 35 by Nepal in the sixth ODI of the 2020 ICC Cricket World League 2 in Nepal in February 2020. The lowest match aggregate in ODI history for New Zealand is 106 scored in the second match of the 1985 tour of West Indies.

Rank	Aggregate	Scores	Venue	Date	Scorecard
1	106/7	New Zealand (51/3) v West Indies (55/4)	Queen's Park Oval, Port of Spain, Trinidad & Tobago	27 March 1985	Scorecard
2	130/10	New Zealand (64) v West Indies (66/0)	Sharjah Cricket Stadium, Sharjah, United Arab Emirates	15 April 1986	Scorecard
3	141/10	Kenya (69) v New Zealand (72/0)	M. A. Chidambaram Stadium, Chennai, India	20 February 2011 ‡	Scorecard
4	149/12	New Zealand (74) v Australia (75/2)	Basin Reserve, Wellington, New Zealand	20 February 1982	Scorecard
5	151/12	New Zealand (74) v Pakistan (77/2)	Sharjah Cricket Stadium, Sharjah, United Arab Emirates	1 May 1990	Scorecard
Last updated: 1 July 2020

=== Result records ===
An ODI match is won when one side has scored more runs than the total runs scored by the opposing side during their innings. If both sides have completed both their allocated innings and the side that fielded last has the higher aggregate of runs, it is known as a win by runs. This indicates the number of runs that they had scored more than the opposing side. If the side batting last wins the match, it is known as a win by wickets, indicating the number of wickets that were still to fall.

==== Greatest win margins (by runs) ====
The greatest winning margin by runs in ODIs was England's victory over South Africa by 342 runs in the third and final ODI of South Africa's 2025 tour of England. New Zealand's greatest winning margin by runs in ODIs was over Ireland by 290 runs in the only ODI of the 2008 England tour.

Rank	Margin	Target	Opposition	Venue	Date
1	290 runs	403	Ireland	Mannofield Park, Aberdeen, Scotland	1 July 2008
2	244 runs	334	India	Bay Oval, Mount Maunganui, New Zealand	13 November 2026
3	210 runs	348	United States	The Oval, London, England	10 September 2004
4	206 runs	277	Australia	Adelaide Oval, Adelaide, Australia	27 January 1986
5	204 runs	326	West Indies	Hagley Oval, Christchurch, New Zealand	23 December 2017
Last updated: 13 November 2026

==== Greatest win margins (by balls remaining) ====
The greatest winning margin by balls remaining in ODIs was England's victory over Canada by 8 wickets with 277 balls remaining in the 1979 Cricket World Cup. The largest victory recorded by New Zealand is during the Bangladesh's tour in 2007 when they won by 10 wickets with 264 balls remaining.

Rank	Balls remaining	Margin	Opposition	Venue	Date
1	264	10 wickets	Bangladesh	Queenstown Events Centre, Queenstown, New Zealand	31 December 2007
2	252	10 wickets	Kenya	M. A. Chidambaram Stadium, Chennai, India	20 February 2011 ‡
3	250	10 wickets	Sri Lanka	Hagley Oval, Christchurch, New Zealand	28 December 2015
4	226	8 wickets	England	Westpac Stadium, Wellington, New Zealand	20 February 2015 ‡
5	212	8 wickets	Scotland	Mannofield Park, Aberdeen, Scotland	3 July 2008
5	212	8 wickets	India	Seddon Park, Hamilton, New Zealand	31 January 2019
Last updated: 1 July 2020

==== Greatest win margins (by wickets) ====
A total of 55 matches have ended with chasing team winning by 10 wickets with West Indies winning by such margins a record 10 times. New Zealand have won an ODI match by this margin on nine occasions.

Rank	Margin	Opposition	Venue	Date
1	10 wickets	India	Melbourne Cricket Ground, Melbourne, Australia	10 January 1981
1	10 wickets	Australia	Westpac Stadium, Wellington, New Zealand	16 February 2007
1	10 wickets	Bangladesh	Queenstown Events Centre, Queenstown, New Zealand	31 December 2007
1	10 wickets	England	Seddon Park, Hamilton, New Zealand	12 February 2008
1	10 wickets	Kenya	M. A. Chidambaram Stadium, Chennai, India	20 February 2011 ‡
1	10 wickets	Zimbabwe	Sardar Patel Stadium, Ahmedabad, India	4 March 2011 ‡
1	10 wickets	Zimbabwe	Harare Sports Club, Harare, Zimbabwe	4 August 2015
1	10 wickets	Sri Lanka	Hagley Oval, Christchurch, New Zealand	28 December 2015
1	10 wickets	Sri Lanka	SWALEC Stadium, Cardiff, England	1 June 2019 ‡
Last updated: 3 December 2017

==== Highest successful run chases ====
South Africa holds the record for the highest successful run chase which they achieved when they scored 438/9 in response to Australia's 434/9. New Zealand's highest innings total while chasing is 348/6 in a successful run chase against India during the India tour of New Zealand in 2020.

Rank	Score	Target	Opposition	Venue	Date
1	348/6	348	India	Seddon Park, Hamilton, New Zealand	5 February 2020
2	350/9	347	Australia	Seddon Park, Hamilton, New Zealand	20 February 2007
3	340/5	337	Australia	Eden Park, Auckland, New Zealand	18 February 2007
4	339/5	336	England	University Oval, Dunedin, New Zealand	7 March 2018
5	332/8	332	Australia	AMI Stadium, Christchurch, New Zealand	10 December 2005
Last updated: 1 July 2020

==== Narrowest win margins (by runs) ====
The narrowest run margin victory is by 1 run which has been achieved in 31 ODI's with New Zealand winning such games a four times.

Rank	Margin	Opposition	Venue	Date
1	1 runs	Pakistan	Jinnah Stadium, Sialkot, Pakistan	16 October 1976
1	1 runs	Australia	Sydney Cricket Ground, Sydney, Australia	13 January 1981
1	1 runs	Australia	WACA, Perth, Australia	3 January 1988
1	1 runs	Australia	Bellerive Oval, Hobart, Australia	18 December 1990
1	1 runs	Ireland	The Village, Dublin, Ireland	15 July 2022
Last updated: 22 August 2022

==== Narrowest win margins (by balls remaining) ====
The narrowest winning margin by balls remaining in ODIs is by winning of the last ball which has been achieved 36 times with New Zealand winning five times.

Rank	Balls remaining	Margin	Opposition	Venue	Date
1	0	5 wickets	Zimbabwe	Bangabandhu National Stadium, Dhaka, Bangladesh	24 October 1998
1	0	1 wicket	Sri Lanka	Queenstown Events Centre, Queenstown, New Zealand	31 December 2006
1	0	1 wicket	England	The Oval, London, England	25 June 2008
1	0	2 wickets	Australia	WACA, Perth, Australia	1 February 2009
1	0	4 wickets	Sri Lanka	Mahinda Rajapaksa International Stadium, Hambantota, Sri Lanka	12 November 2013
Last updated: 1 July 2020

==== Narrowest win margins (by wickets) ====
The narrowest margin of victory by wickets is 1 wicket which has settled 55 such ODIs. New Zealand have recorded such victory on nine occasions.

Rank	Margin	Opposition	Venue	Date
1	1 wicket	West Indies	AMI Stadium, Christchurch, New Zealand	6 February 1980
1	1 wicket	Pakistan	AMI Stadium, Christchurch, New Zealand	17 December 1995
1	1 wicket	Sri Lanka	Queenstown Events Centre, Queenstown, New Zealand	31 December 2006
1	1 wicket	Australia	Seddon Park, Hamilton, New Zealand	20 February 2007
1	1 wicket	England	The Oval, London, England	25 June 2008
1	1 wicket	South Africa	Boland Park, Paarl, South Africa	19 January 2013
1	1 wicket	Sri Lanka	SWALEC Stadium, Cardiff, England	9 June 2013
1	1 wicket	Australia	Eden Park, Auckland, New Zealand	28 February 2015 ‡
1	1 wicket	Ireland	The Village, Dublin, Ireland	10 July 2022
Last updated: 22 August 2022

==== Greatest loss margins (by runs) ====
New Zealand's biggest defeat by runs was against Australia in the 2007 Cricket World Cup at National Cricket Stadium, St. George's, Grenada.

Rank	Margin	Opposition	Venue	Date
1	215 runs	Australia	National Cricket Stadium, St. George's, Grenada	20 April 2007 ‡
2	210 runs	England	Edgbaston, Birmingham, England	9 June 2015
3	203 runs	West Indies	Seddon Park, Hamilton, New Zealand	8 January 2014
4	190 runs	India	APCA-VDCA Stadium, Visakhapatnam, India	29 October 2016
5	189 runs	Sri Lanka	Eden Park, Auckland, New Zealand	6 January 2007
Last updated: 1 July 2020

==== Greatest loss margins (by balls remaining) ====
The greatest winning margin by balls remaining in ODIs was England's victory over Canada by 8 wickets with 277 balls remaining in the 1979 Cricket World Cup. The largest defeat suffered by New Zealand was against New Zealand in New Zealand when they lost by 10 wickets with 264 balls remaining.

Rank	Balls remaining	Margin	Opposition	Venue	Date
1	209	9 wickets	Bangladesh	McLean Park, Napier, New Zealand	23 December 2023
2	206	8 wickets	Pakistan	Sharjah Cricket Stadium, Sharjah, United Arab Emirates	1 May 1990
3	200	8 wickets	Australia	Nahar Singh Stadium, Faridabad, India	29 October 2003
4	179	8 wickets	India	Shaheed Veer Narayan Singh International Cricket Stadium, Raipur, India	21 January 2023
5	177	8 wickets	Australia	Basin Reserve, Wellington, New Zealand	20 February 1982
Last updated: 23 December 2023

==== Greatest loss margins (by wickets) ====
New Zealand have lost an ODI match by a margin of 10 wickets on three occasions with most recent being during the fourth match of the West Indies tour of New Zealand in March 1987.

Rank	Margins	Opposition	Most recent venue	Date
1	10 wickets	West Indies	Queen's Park Oval, Port of Spain, Trinidad & Tobago	17 April 1985
1	10 wickets	Pakistan	Sharjah Cricket Stadium, Sharjah, United Arab Emirates	15 April 1986
1	10 wickets	West Indies	AMI Stadium, Christchurch, New Zealand	15 April 1986
4	9 wickets	India	Vidarbha Cricket Association Ground, Nagpur, India	31 October 1987 ‡
4	9 wickets	West Indies	AMI Stadium, Christchurch, New Zealand	28 January 1995
4	9 wickets	Pakistan	Old Trafford, Manchester, England	16 June 1999 ‡
4	9 wickets	Sri Lanka	Eden Park, Auckland, New Zealand	6 February 2001
4	9 wickets	India	Reliance Stadium, Vadodara, India	4 December 2010
4	9 wickets	West Indies	Sabina Park, Kingston, Jamaica	5 July 2012
4	9 wickets	Bangladesh	McLean Park, Napier, New Zealand	23 December 2023
Last updated: 23 December 2023

==== Narrowest loss margins (by runs) ====
The narrowest loss of New Zealand in terms of runs is by 1 run suffered thrice.

Rank	Margin	Opposition	Venue	Date
1	1 run	India	Basin Reserve, Wellington, New Zealand	6 March 1990
1	1 run	South Africa	Bellerive Oval, Hobart, Australia	11 December 1997
1	1 run	Zimbabwe	AMI Stadium, Christchurch, New Zealand	4 March 1998
4	2 runs	South Africa	Brisbane Cricket Ground, Brisbane, Australia	9 January 1998
4	2 runs	Australia	Westpac Stadium, Wellington, New Zealand	5 December 2005
Last updated: 1 July 2020

==== Narrowest loss margins (by balls remaining) ====
The narrowest winning margin by balls remaining in ODIs is by winning of the last ball which has been achieved 36 times with both South Africa winning seven times. New Zealand has suffered loss by this margin six times.

Rank	Balls remaining	Margin	Opposition	Venue	Date
1	0	1 wicket	Pakistan	Multan Cricket Stadium, Multan, Pakistan	7 December 1984
1	0	2 wickets	South Africa	McLean Park, Napier, New Zealand	26 March 1999
1	0	3 wickets	South Africa	Sahara Park Newlands, Cape Town, South Africa	4 November 2000
1	0	4 wickets	West Indies	Arnos Vale Stadium, Kingstown, Saint Vincent & the Grenadines	16 June 2002
1	0	2 wickets	South Africa	Sahara Stadium, Kingsmead, Durban, South Africa	25 November 2007
1	0	1 wicket	South Africa	North West Cricket Stadium, Potchefstroom, South Africa	25 January 2013
Last updated: 1 July 2020

==== Narrowest loss margins (by wickets) ====
New Zealand has suffered defeat by 1 wicket on seven occasions.

Rank	Margin	Opposition	Venue	Date
1	1 wicket	Australia	AMI Stadium, Christchurch, New Zealand	21 March 1993
1	1 wicket	India	Eden Park, Auckland, New Zealand	11 January 2003
1	1 wicket	Pakistan	Multan Cricket Stadium, Multan, Pakistan	7 December 1984
1	1 wicket	South Africa	North West Cricket Stadium, Potchefstroom, South Africa	25 January 2013
1	1 wicket	West Indies	Sabina Park, Kingston, Jamaica	26 March 1996 ‡
1	1 wicket	Zimbabwe	Eden Park, Auckland, New Zealand	7 January 2001
1	1 wicket	Zimbabwe	Queens Sports Club, Bulawayo, Zimbabwe	25 October 2011
Last updated: 1 July 2020

==== Tied matches ====
A tie can occur when the scores of both teams are equal at the conclusion of play, provided that the side batting last has completed their innings. There have been 37 ties in ODIs history with New Zealand involved in seven such games.

Opposition	Venue	Date
Pakistan	Eden Park, Auckland, New Zealand	13 March 1994
Sri Lanka	Sharjah Cricket Stadium, Sharjah, United Arab Emirates	11 November 1996
England	McLean Park, Napier, New Zealand	26 February 1997
Zimbabwe	Queens Sports Club, Bulawayo, Zimbabwe	1 October 1997
England	McLean Park, Napier, New Zealand	20 February 2008
India	Eden Park, Auckland, New Zealand	25 January 2014
England	Lord's, London, England	14 July 2019 ‡
Last updated: 3 December 2017

== Individual records ==
=== Batting records ===
==== Most career runs ====
A run is the basic means of scoring in cricket. A run is scored when the batsman hits the ball with his bat and with his partner runs the length of 22 yards (20 m) of the pitch. India's Sachin Tendulkar has scored the most runs in ODIs with 18,246. Second is Kumar Sangakkara of Sri Lanka with 14,234 ahead of Ricky Ponting from Australia in third with 13,704. Ross Taylor is the leading New Zealand on this list.

Rank	Runs	Player	Matches	Innings	Average	100	50	Period
1	8,607	Ross Taylor	236	220	47.55	21	51	2006–2022
2	8,007	Stephen Fleming	279	268	32.41	8	49	1994–2007
3	7,346	Martin Guptill	198	189	41.73	18	38	2009–2022
4	7,256	Kane Williamson†	175	167	48.69	15	47	2010–2025
5	7,090	Nathan Astle	223	217	34.92	16	41	1995–2007
6	6,083	Brendon McCullum	260	228	30.41	5	32	2002–2016
7	4,881	Chris Cairns	214	192	29.22	4	25	1991–2006
8	4,707	Craig McMillan	197	183	28.18	3	28	1997–2007
9	4,704	Martin Crowe	143	140	38.55	4	34	1982–1995
10	4,483	Scott Styris	188	161	32.48	4	28	1999–2011
Last updated: 29 March 2025

==== Fastest runs getter ====
Runs	Batsman	Match	Innings	Record Date	Reference
1000	Devon Conway†	25	24	5 October 2023	
2000	Daryl Mitchell†	52	47	5 April 2025	
3000	Kane Williamson†	78	73	17 June 2015	
4000	Kane Williamson†	102	96	26 December 2016	
5000	Kane Williamson†	125	119	3 March 2018	
6000	Kane Williamson†	146	139	29 June 2019 ‡	
7000	Kane Williamson†	167	159	10 February 2025	
8000	Ross Taylor	218	203	20 February 2019	
Last updated: 13 January 2026

==== Most runs in each batting position ====
Batting position	Batsman	Innings	Runs	Average	Career Span	Ref
Opener	Martin Guptill	174	6,721	38.62	2009–2022	
Number 3	Kane Williamson†	140	6,504	51.61	2010–2025	
Number 4	Ross Taylor	182	7,690	51.26	2006–2022	
Number 5	Chris Cairns	85	2,374	31.23	1992–2005	
Number 6	Chris Cairns	54	1,301	28.28	1994–2006	
Number 7	Chris Harris	104	2,130	31.32	1990–2004	
Number 8	Mitchell Santner†	62	1,099	28.92	2016–2025	
Number 9	Daniel Vettori	61	554	14.20	1997–2011	
Number 10	Kyle Mills	38	344	17.20	2001–2014	
Number 11	Trent Boult†	43	176	9.26	2012–2023	
Last updated: 11 January 2026

==== Most runs against each team ====
Opposition	Runs	Player	Matches	Innings	Span	Ref
Afghanistan	112	Kane Williamson†	2	2	2015–2019	
Australia	1,241	Stephen Fleming	47	46	1994–2007	
Bangladesh	1,010	Ross Taylor	25	24	2007–2021	
Canada	153	Brendon McCullum	3	2	2003–2011	
East Africa	171	Glenn Turner	1	1	1975–1975	
England	1,424	Ross Taylor	35	34	2007–2019	
India	1,385	Ross Taylor	35	34	2009–2020	
Ireland	227	Tom Latham†	5	5	2017–2022	
Kenya	85	Ross Taylor	1	1	2007–2011	
Netherlands	294	Will Young†	4	4	2022–2023	
Pakistan	1,291	Kane Williamson†	25	25	2011–2025	
Scotland	101	Mark Chapman†	1	1	2022–2022	
South Africa	1,280	Stephen Fleming	40	37	1994–2007	
Sri Lanka	881	Ross Taylor	34	29	2006–2019	
United Arab Emirates	92	Roger Twose	1	1	1996–1996	
United States	145	Nathan Astle	1	1	2004–2004	
West Indies	1,014	Nathan Astle	29	28	1995–2006	
Zimbabwe	989	Nathan Astle	22	22	1996–2005	
Last updated: 19 February 2025

==== Highest individual score ====
Martin Guptill holds the New Zealand record, scoring 237* in the fourth quarter-final of the 2015 Cricket World Cup against West Indies.

Rank	Runs	Player	Opposition	Venue	Date
1	237*	Martin Guptill	West Indies	Westpac Stadium, Wellington, New Zealand	21 March 2015‡
2	189*	Martin Guptill	England	Rose Bowl, Southampton, England	2 June 2013
3	181*	Ross Taylor	England	University Oval, Dunedin, New Zealand	7 March 2018
4	180*	Martin Guptill	South Africa	Seddon Park, Hamilton, New Zealand	1 March 2017
5	172	Lou Vincent	Zimbabwe	Queens Sports Club, Bulawayo, Zimbabwe	24 August 2005
Last updated: 1 July 2020

==== Highest individual score – progression of record ====
Runs	Player	Opponent	Venue	Season
47	Mark Burgess	Pakistan	AMI Stadium, Christchurch, New Zealand	1972–73
55	Vic Pollard	England	St Helen's, Swansea, England	1973
82	Bevan Congdon	Australia	Carisbrook, Dunedin, New Zealand	1973–74
104	Ken Wadsworth	Australia	AMI Stadium, Christchurch, New Zealand	1973–74
171*	Glenn Turner	East Africa	Edgbaston, Birmingham, England	1975‡
172	Lou Vincent	Zimbabwe	Queens Sports Club, Bulawayo, Zimbabwe	2005
189*	Martin Guptill	England	Rose Bowl, Southampton, England	2013
237*	Martin Guptill	West Indies	Westpac Stadium, Wellington, New Zealand	2014–15
Last updated: 1 July 2020

==== Most individual score in each batting position ====
Batting position	Batsman	Score	Opposition	Ground	Date	Ref
Opener	Martin Guptill	237*	West Indies	Sky Stadium, Wellington, New Zealand	21 March 2015	
Number 3	Kane Williamson	148	West Indies	Old Trafford, Manchester, England	22 June 2019	
Number 4	Ross Taylor	181*	England	University Oval, Dunedin, New Zealand	7 March 2018	
Number 5	Tom Latham	145*	India	Eden Park, Auckland, New Zealand	25 November 2022	
Number 6	Craig McMillan	117	Australia	Seddon Park, Hamilton, New Zealand	20 February 2007	
Number 7	Luke Ronchi	170*	Sri Lanka	University Oval, Dunedin, New Zealand	23 January 2015	
Number 8	Daniel Vettori	83	Australia	AMI Stadium, Christchurch, New Zealand	22 February 2005	
Number 8	Jacob Oram	83	Bangladesh	McLean Park, Napier, New Zealand	5 February 2010	
Number 9	Kyle Mills	54	India	AMI Stadium, Christchurch, New Zealand	8 March 2009	
Number 10	Tim Southee	55	India	Himachal Pradesh Cricket Association Stadium, Dharamsala, India	16 October 2016	
Number 11	Chris Pringle	34*	West Indies	Nehru Stadium, Guwahati, India	1 November 1994	
Number 11	Mitchell McClenaghan	34*	South Africa	Bay Oval, Mount Maunganui, New Zealand	24 October 2014	
Number 11	Jeetan Patel	34	Sri Lanka	Sabina Park, Kingston, Jamaica	24 April 2007	
Last Updated: 19 January 2023

==== Highest score against each opponent ====
Opposition	Runs	Player	Venue	Date	Ref
Afghanistan	79*	Kane Williamson†	The Cooper Associates County Ground, Taunton, England	8 June 2019 ‡	
Australia	130	Chris Harris	M. A. Chidambaram Stadium, Chennai, India	11 March 1996 ‡	
Bangladesh	137	Tom Latham†	Hagley Oval, Christchurch, New Zealand	26 December 2016	
Canada	101	Lou Vincent	Darren Sammy National Cricket Stadium, Gros Islet, Saint Lucia	22 March 2007 ‡	
Canada	101	Brendon McCullum	Wankhede Stadium, Mumbai, India	13 March 2011 ‡	
East Africa	171*	Glenn Turner	Edgbaston, Birmingham, England	7 June 1975 ‡	
England	189*	Martin Guptill	Rose Bowl, Southampton, England	2 June 2013	
India	145*	Tom Latham†	Eden Park, Auckland, New Zealand	25 November 2022	
Ireland	166	Brendon McCullum	Mannofield Park, Aberdeen, Scotland	1 July 2008	
Kenya	85	Ross Taylor	Darren Sammy National Cricket Stadium, Gros Islet, Saint Lucia	20 March 2007 ‡	
Netherlands	140*	Tom Latham†	Seddon Park, Hamilton, New Zealand	2 April 2022	
Pakistan	132	Mark Chapman†	McLean Park, Napier, New Zealand	29 March 2025	
Scotland	101*	Mark Chapman†	The Grange, Edinburg, Scotland	31 July 2022	
South Africa	180*	Martin Guptill	Seddon Park, Hamilton, New Zealand	1 March 2007	
Sri Lanka	170*	Luke Ronchi	University Oval, Dunedin, New Zealand	23 January 2015	
United Arab Emirates	92	Roger Twose	Iqbal Stadium, Faisalabad, Pakistan	27 February 1996 ‡	
United States	145*	Nathan Astle	The Oval, London, England	10 September 2004	
West Indies	237*	Martin Guptill	Wellington Regional Stadium, Wellington, New Zealand	21 March 2015 ‡	
Zimbabwe	172	Lou Vincent	Queens Sports Club, Bulawayo, Zimbabwe	24 August 2005	
Last updated: 16 January 2026.

==== Highest career average ====
A batsman's batting average is the total number of runs they have scored divided by the number of times they have been dismissed.

Rank	Average	Player	Innings	Runs	Not out	Period
1	53.82	Daryl Mitchell†	52	2,422	7	2021–2026
2	48.69	Kane Williamson†	167	7,256	18	2010–2025
3	47.55	Ross Taylor	220	8,607	39	2006–2022
4	47.00	Glenn Turner	40	1,598	6	1973–1983
5	45.16	Devon Conway†	40	1,671	3	2021–2026
Qualification: 20 innings. Last updated: 11 January 2026

==== Highest Average in each batting position ====
Batting position	Batsman	Innings	Runs	Average	Career Span	Ref
Opener	Glenn Turner	29	1,197	49.87	1973–1983	
Number 3	Kane Williamson†	140	6,504	51.61	2010–2025	
Number 4	Ross Taylor	182	7,690	51.26	2006–2022	
Number 5	Grant Elliott	45	1,291	33.10	2008–2016	
Number 6	Glenn Phillips†	31	1,000	40.00	2022–2025	
Number 7	Michael Bracewell†	20	613	47.15	2022–2026	
Number 8	Chris Harris	23	519	39.92	1996–2004	
Number 9	James Franklin	20	283	23.58	2001–2007	
Number 10	Kyle Mills	38	344	17.20	2001–2014	
Number 11	Ewen Chatfield	44	106	13.25	1979–1988	
Last updated: 11 January 2026. Qualification: Min 20 innings batted at position

==== Most half-centuries ====
A half-century is a score of between 50 and 99 runs. Statistically, once a batsman's score reaches 100, it is no longer considered a half-century but a century.

Sachin Tendulkar of India has scored the most half-centuries in ODIs with 96. He is followed by the Sri Lanka's Kumar Sangakkara on 93, South Africa's Jacques Kallis on 86 and India's Rahul Dravid and Pakistan's Inzamam-ul-Haq on 83.Ross Taylor is the leading New Zealander in this list with 51 half-centuries.

Rank	Half centuries	Player	Innings	Runs	Period
1	51	Ross Taylor	220	8,607	2006–2022
2	49	Stephen Fleming	268	8,007	1994–2007
3	47	Kane Williamson†	167	7,256	2010–2025
4	41	Nathan Astle	217	7,090	1995–2007
5	39	Martin Guptill	195	7,346	2009–2022
Last updated: 9 February 2025

==== Most centuries ====
A century is a score of 100 or more runs in a single innings.

Virat Kohli has scored the most centuries in ODIs with 54. New Zealand's Ross Taylor has the most centuries for New Zealand.

Rank	Centuries	Player	Innings	Runs	Period
1	21	Ross Taylor	220	8,607	2006–2021
2	18	Martin Guptill	189	7,346	2009–2022
3	16	Nathan Astle	217	7,090	1995–2007
4	15	Kane Williamson†	167	7,256	2010–2025
5	9	Daryl Mitchell†	54	2,690	2021–2026
Last updated: 19 January 2026

==== Most Sixes ====
Rank	Sixes	Player	Innings	Runs	Period
1	200	Brendon McCullum	228	6,083	2002–2016
2	186	Martin Guptill	189	7,207	2009–2022
3	151	Chris Cairns	192	4,881	1991–2006
4	147	Ross Taylor	220	8,607	2006–2022
5	86	Nathan Astle	217	7,090	1995–2007
Last updated: 16 July 2022

==== Most Fours ====
Rank	Fours	Player	Innings	Runs	Period
1	822	Stephen Fleming	268	8,007	1994–2007
2	750	Martin Guptill	195	7,346	2009–2022
3	720	Nathan Astle	217	7,090	1995–2007
4	713	Ross Taylor	220	8,607	2006–2022
5	667	Kane Williamson†	167	7,256	2010–2025
Last updated: 29 March 2025

==== Highest strike rates ====
Andre Russell of West Indies holds the record for highest strike rate, with minimum 500 balls faced qualification, with 130.22. Luke Ronchi, one of 14 men to have played ODIs for two national teams is the New Zealand batsmen with the highest strike rate.

Rank	Strike rate	Player	Runs	Balls Faced	Period
1	111.66	Luke Ronchi	1,321	1,183	2013–2017
2	108.72	Corey Anderson	1,109	1,020	2013–2017
3	108.41	Michael Bracewell†	928	856	2022–2025
4	107.72	Mark Chapman†	781	725	2018–2025
5	107.55	Rachin Ravindra†	1,424	1,324	2023-2023
Qualification= 500 balls faced. Last updated: 11 January 2026

==== Highest strike rates in an inning ====
James Franklin of New Zealand's strike rate of 387.50 during his 31* off 8 balls against Canada during 2011 Cricket World Cup is the world record for highest strike rate in an innings.

Rank	Strike rate	Player	Runs	Balls Faced	Opposition	Venue	Date
1	387.50	James Franklin	31*	8	Canada	Wankhede Stadium, Mumbai, India	13 March 2011 ‡
2	361.53	James Neesham	47*	13	Sri Lanka	Bay Oval, Mount Maunganui, New Zealand	3 January 2019
3	355.55	Nathan McCullum	32*	9	Sri Lanka	Mahinda Rajapaksa International Stadium, Hambantota, Sri Lanka	12 November 2013
4	310.00	Martin Guptill	93*	30	Sri Lanka	Hagley Oval, Christchurch, New Zealand	28 December 2015
5	309.09	James Neesham	34*	11	West Indies	Kensington Oval, Bridgetown, West indies	21 August 2022
Last updated: 11 January 2026

==== Most runs in a calendar year ====
Tendulkar holds the record for most runs scored in a calendar year with 1894 runs scored in 1998. Guptill scored 1489 runs in 2015, the most for a New Zealand batsmen in a year.

Rank	Runs	Player	Matches	Innings	Year
1	1,489	Martin Guptill	32	32	2015
2	1,376	Kane Williamson	27	26	2015
3	1,204	Daryl Mitchell†	26	25	2023
4	1,067	Roger Twose	25	22	2000
5	1,046	Ross Taylor	27	25	2015
Last updated: 11 January 2026

==== Most runs in a series ====
George Munsey holds the record for the most runs scored in a single One Day International series, amassing 894 runs in the ICC Men's Cricket World Cup League 2 2023/24–2027, the highest aggregate in ODI history. He is followed by Milind Kumar, who scored 857 runs in the same league competition.For New Zealand, the record for the most runs scored by a New Zealand batsman in a single One Day International series is jointly held by Kane Williamson and Rachin Ravindra. Williamson scored 578 runs in the 2019 Cricket World Cup, while Ravindra matched that tally with 578 runs in the 2023 Cricket World Cup.

Rank	Runs	Player	Matches	Innings	Series
1	578	Kane Williamson†	10	9	2019 Cricket World Cup
1	578	Rachin Ravindra†	10	10	2023 Cricket World Cup
2	552	Daryl Mitchell†	10	9	2023 Cricket World Cup
3	547	Martin Guptill	9	9	2015 Cricket World Cup
4	511	John Wright	13	13	1980-81 Benson & Hedges World Series Cup
Last updated: 11 January 2026

==== Most ducks ====
A duck refers to a batsman being dismissed without scoring a run. Sanath Jayasuriya has scored the equal highest number of ducks in ODIs with 34 such knocks. Daniel Vettori, the 100th New Zealand ODI player, hold this dubious record for New Zealand with 22 ducks (23 in total including one for ICC World XI during the 2005 ICC Super Series).

Rank	Ducks	Player	Matches	Innings	Period
1	22	Daniel Vettori	291	183	1997–2015
2	20	Brendon McCullum	260	228	2002–2016
3	19	Adam Parore	179	161	1992–2002
3	19	Nathan Astle	222	217	1995–2007
5	17	Stephen Fleming	279	268	1994–2007
Last updated: 1 July 2020

=== Bowling records ===
==== Most career wickets ====
A bowler takes the wicket of a batsman when the form of dismissal is bowled, caught, leg before wicket, stumped or hit wicket. If the batsman is dismissed by run out, obstructing the field, handling the ball, hitting the ball twice or timed out the bowler does not receive credit.

New Zealand's Daniel Vettori with 297 wickets has taken the most wickets for his team in ODIs. He lies in the 14th position in the overall list of leading ODI wicket-takers.

Rank	Wickets	Player	Matches	Innings	Average	SR	4	5	Period
1	297	Daniel Vettori	291	273	31.96	46.5	7	2	1997–2015
2	240	Kyle Mills	170	169	27.02	34.2	8	1	2001–2015
3	221	Tim Southee	161	159	33.70	36.5	5	3	2008–2023
4	211	Trent Boult†	114	113	24.38	29.3	10	6	2012–2023
5	203	Chris Harris	250	232	37.50	52.5	2	1	1990–2004
6	200	Chris Cairns	214	185	32.78	40.6	3	1	1991–2006
7	173	Jacob Oram	160	154	29.17	39.9	3	2	2001–2012
8	172	Matt Henry†	95	93	24.98	28.75	13	3	2014–2025
9	158	Richard Hadlee	114	112	21.56	39.1	1	5	1973–1990
10	147	Shane Bond	82	80	20.88	29.2	7	4	2002–2010
Last updated: 11 January 2026

==== Fastest wicket taker ====
Wickets	Bowler	Match	Record Date	Reference
50	Mitchell McClenaghan	23	24 October 2014	
100	Shane Bond	54	23 January 2007	
150	Trent Boult	81	5 June 2019	
200	Trent Boult	107	13 October 2023	
250	Daniel Vettori	245	5 February 2010	
Last updated: 14 October 2023

==== Most career wickets against each team ====
Opposition	Wickets	Player	Matches	Innings	Period	Ref
Afghanistan	7	Lockie Ferguson†	2	2	2019–2023	
Australia	51	Ewen Chatfield	34	33	1980–1988	
Bangladesh	33	Kyle Mills	17	17	2002–2013	
Canada	7	Jacob Oram	3	3	2003–2011	
East Africa	3	Dayle Hadlee	1	1	1975–1975	
England	40	Tim Southee	24	24	2008–2023	
India	38	Tim Southee	25	24	2008–2022	
Ireland	11	Mitchell Santner†	4	4	2017–2022	
Kenya	4	Hamish Bennett	1	1	2011–2011	
Netherlands	8	Matt Henry†	3	3	2022–2023	
Pakistan	39	Danny Morrison	24	24	1989–1996	
Scotland	5	Daniel Vettori	2	2	2008–2015	
South Africa	33	Chris Cairns	31	30	1992–2004	
Sri Lanka	33	Matt Henry†	15	13	2015–2025	
United Arab Emirates	3	Shane Thompson	1	1	1996–1996	
United States	5	Jacob Oram	1	1	2004–2004	
West Indies	33	Daniel Vettori	25	22	2000–2015	
Zimbabwe	19	Chris Harris	20	20	1992–2003	
Zimbabwe	19	Daniel Vettori	13	12	1997–2011	
Last updated: 11 January 2025

==== Best figures in an innings ====
Bowling figures refers to the number of the wickets a bowler has taken and the number of runs conceded. Sri Lanka's Chaminda Vaas holds the world record for best figures in an innings when he took 8/19 against Zimbabwe in December 2001 at Colombo (SSC). Tim Southee holds the New Zealand record for best bowling figures when he took 7/33 against England during the 2015 Cricket World Cup.

Rank	Figures	Player	Opposition	Venue	Date
1	7/33	Tim Southee	England	Westpac Stadium, Wellington, New Zealand	20 February 2015
2	7/34	Trent Boult	West Indies	Hagley Oval, Christchurch, New Zealand	23 December 2017
3	6/19	Shane Bond	India	Queens Sports Club, Bulawayo, Zimbabwe	26 August 2005
4	6/23	Shane Bond	Australia	Axxess DSL St. Georges, Port Elizabeth, South Africa	11 March 2003 ‡
5	6/25	Scott Styris	West Indies	Queen's Park Oval, Port of Spain, Trinidad & Tobago	12 June 2002
Last updated: 1 July 2020

==== Best figures in an innings – progression of record ====
Figures	Player	Opposition	Venue	Date
4/34	Dayle Hadlee	Pakistan	AMI Stadium, Christchurch, New Zealand	1972–73
5/23	Richard Collinge	India	AMI Stadium, Christchurch, New Zealand	1975–76
5/22	Matthew Hart	West Indies	Nehru Stadium, Fatorda, India	1994–95
6/25	Scott Styris	West Indies	Queen's Park Oval, Port of Spain, Trinidad & Tobago	2002
6/23	Shane Bond	Australia	Axxess DSL St. Georges, Port Elizabeth, South Africa	2002–03 ‡
6/19	Shane Bond	India	Queens Sports Club, Bulawayo, Zimbabwe	2005
7/33	Tim Southee	England	Westpac Stadium, Wellington, New Zealand	2014–2015 ‡
Last updated: 1 July 2020

==== Best Bowling Figure against each opponent ====
Opposition	Figures	Player	Venue	Date	Ref
Afghanistan	5/31	James Neesham	The Cooper Associates County Ground, Taunton, England	8 June 2019	
Australia	6/23	Shane Bond	St George's Park, Port Elizabeth, South Africa	11 March 2003 ‡	
Bangladesh	6/39	Ish Sodhi†	Shere Bangla National Stadium, Mirpur, Bangladesh	23 September 2023	
Canada	4/52	Jacob Oram	Willowmoore Park, Benoni, South Africa	3 March 2003 ‡	
East Africa	3/21	Dayle Hadlee	Edgbaston, Birmingham, England	7 June 1975 ‡	
England	7/33	Tim Southee†	Wellington Regional Stadium, Wellington, New Zealand	20 February 2015 ‡	
India	6/19	Shane Bond	Queens Sports Club, Bulawayo, Zimbabwe	26 August 2008	
Ireland	5/50	Mitchell Santner†	Malahide Cricket Club Ground, Dublin, Ireland	14 May 2017	
Kenya	4/16	Hamish Bennett	M. A. Chidambaram Stadium, Chennai, India	20 February 2011	
Netherlands	5/59	Mitchell Santner†	Rajiv Gandhi International Cricket Stadium, Hyderabad, India	4 April 2022	
Pakistan	5/17	Trent Boult†	University Oval, Dunedin, New Zealand	13 January 2018	
Scotland	4/7	Chris Harris	Grange CC Ground, Edinburgh, Scotland	31 May 1999 ‡	
South Africa	5/25	Kyle Mills	Kingsmead Cricket Ground, Durban, South Africa	25 November 2007	
Sri Lanka	5/25	Richard Hadlee	Bristol County Ground, Bristol, England	13 June 1983 ‡	
United Arab Emirates	3/20	Shane Thompson	Iqbal Stadium, Faisalabad, Pakistan	27 February 1996 ‡	
United States	5/36	Jacob Oram	The Oval, London, England	10 September 2004	
West Indies	7/34	Trent Boult†	Hagley Oval, Christchurch, New Zealand	23 December 2017	
Zimbabwe	5/39	Shayne O'Connor	Basin Reserve, Wellington, New Zealand	6 February 1998	
Last updated: 24 September 2023.

==== Best career average ====
A bowler's bowling average is the total number of runs they have conceded divided by the number of wickets they have taken. Afghanistan's Rashid Khan holds the record for the best career average in ODIs with 18.54. Joel Garner, West New Zealand cricketer, and a member of the highly regarded late 1970s and early 1980s West Indies cricket teams, is second behind Rashid with an overall career average of 18.84 runs per wicket. Shane Bond is the highest ranked New Zealand when the qualification of 2000 balls bowled is followed.

Rank	Average	Player	Wickets	Runs	Balls	Period
1	20.88	Shane Bond	147	3,070	4,295	2002–2010
2	21.56	Richard Hadlee	158	3,407	6,182	1973–1990
3	23.87	Chris Pringle	103	2,459	3,314	1990–1995
4	24.38	Trent Boult†	211	5,146	6,180	2012–2023
5	24.98	Matt Henry†	172	4,298	4,946	2014–2025
Qualification: 2,000 balls. Last updated: 16 November 2025

==== Best career economy rate ====
A bowler's economy rate is the total number of runs they have conceded divided by the number of overs they have bowled. West Indies' Joel Garner, holds the ODI record for the best career economy rate with 3.09. New Zealand's Richard Hadlee, with a rate of 3.30 runs per over conceded over his 115-match ODI career, has the fifth best economy rate among all the bowlers.

Rank	Economy rate	Player	Wickets	Runs	Balls	Period
1	3.30	Richard Hadlee	158	3,407	6,182	1973–1990
2	3.57	Ewen Chatfield	140	3,618	6,065	1979–1989
3	3.76	Gavin Larsen	113	4,000	6,368	1990–1999
4	4.06	Lance Cairns	89	2,717	4,015	1974–1985
5	4.12	Daniel Vettori	297	9,495	13,820	1997–2015
Qualification: 2,000 balls, Last updated: 1 July 2020

==== Best career strike rate ====
A bowler's strike rate is the total number of balls they have bowled divided by the number of wickets they have taken. The top bowler with the best ODI career strike rate is Oman's Bilal Khan with strike rate of 24.8 balls per wicket. New Zealand's Mitchell McClenaghan is the highest ranked New Zealand in this list when a qualification of 2000 balls is applied.

Rank	Strike rate	Player	Wickets	Runs	Balls	Period
1	28.4	Mitchell McClenaghan	82	2,313	2,336	2013–2016
2	28.7	Matt Henry†	172	4,298	4,946	2014–2025
3	29.2	Shane Bond	147	3,070	4,295	2002–2010
3	29.2	Trent Boult†	211	5,146	6,180	2012–2023
4	32.1	Chris Pringle	103	2,459	3,314	1990-1995
Qualification: 2,000 balls. Last updated: 26 December 2025

==== Most four-wickets (& over) hauls in an innings ====
Trent Boult is joint-15th on the list of most four-wicket hauls with Pakistan's Waqar Younis, Sri Lanka's Muttiah Muralitharan and Australia's Brett Lee leading this list in ODIs.

Rank	Four-wicket hauls	Player	Matches	Balls	Wickets	Period
1	16	Trent Boult	114	6,180	211	2012–2023
2	16	Matt Henry†	95	4,946	172	2014–2025
3	11	Shane Bond	82	4,295	147	2002–2010
4	9	Kyle Mills	170	8,230	240	2001–2015
4	9	Daniel Vettori	291	13,820	297	1997–2015
Last updated: 26 October 2025

==== Most five-wicket hauls in a match ====
A five-wicket haul refers to a bowler taking five wickets in a single innings. Trent Boult, with six hauls, is the highest ranked New Zealand on the list of most five-wicket hauls which is headed by Pakistan's Waqar Younis with 13 such hauls.

Rank	Five-wicket hauls	Player	Matches	Balls	Wickets	Period
1	6	Trent Boult	114	6,180	211	2012–2023
2	5	Richard Hadlee	115	6,182	158	1973–1990
3	4	Shane Bond	82	4,295	147	2002–2010
4	3	Tim Southee	161	8,075	221	2008–2023
4	3	Matt Henry†	94	4,890	168	2014–2025
5	2	Danny Morrison	96	4,586	126	1987–1996
5	2	Shayne O'Connor	38	1,487	46	1997–2000
5	2	Jacob Oram	160	6,911	173	2001–2012
5	2	Daniel Vettori	291	13,820	297	1997–2015
5	2	James Neesham†	76	2,448	71	2013–2023
5	2	Mitchell Santner†	123	5,839	131	2015–2025
5	2	Ben Sears†	4	206	10	2025–2025
Last updated: 4 April 2025

==== Best economy rates in an inning ====
The best economy rate in an inning, when a minimum of 30 balls are delivered by the player, is West Indies player Phil Simmons economy of 0.30 during his spell of 3 runs for 4 wickets in 10 overs against Pakistan at Sydney Cricket Ground in the 1991-92 Australian Tri-Series. Ewen Chatfield holds the New Zealand record during his spell in first ODI against Sri Lanka at Carisbrook, Dunedin.

Rank	Economy	Player	Overs	Runs	Wickets	Opposition	Venue	Date
1	0.80	Ewen Chatfield	10	8	1	Sri Lanka	Carisbrook, Dunedin, New Zealand	2 March 1983
2	0.83	Richard Hadlee	12	10	0	East Africa	Edgbaston, Birmingham, England	7 June 1975 ‡
3	0.96	Ewen Chatfield	9.2	9	2	India	WACA, Perth, Australia	18 January 1986
4	1.00	Lance Cairns	10	10	0	Sri Lanka	Carisbrook, Dunedin, New Zealand	2 March 1983
4	1.00	Richard Hadlee	6	6	1	India	Eden Park, Auckland, New Zealand	14 February 1981
4	1.00	Daryl Tuffey	7	7	1	India	Ranasinghe Premadasa Stadium, Colombo, Sri Lanka	20 July 2001
Qualification: 30 balls bowled. Last updated: 1 July 2020

==== Best strike rates in an inning ====
The best strike rate in an inning, when a minimum of 4 wickets are taken by the player, is shared by Sunil Dhaniram of Canada, Paul Collingwood of England and Virender Sehwag of India when they achieved a strike rate of 4.2 balls pr wicket. Chris Harris during his spell of 4/7 achieved the best strike rate for a New Zealand bowler.

Rank	Strike rate	Player	Wickets	Runs	Balls	Opposition	Venue	Date
1	4.7	Chris Harris	4	7	19	Scotland	Grange CC Ground, Edinburgh, Scotland	31 May 1999 ‡
2	6.2	Rob Nicol	4	19	25	Zimbabwe	University Oval, Dunedin, New Zealand	3 February 2012
3	6.7	Kyle Mills	4	30	27	England	SWALEC Stadium, Cardiff, England	16 June 2013
4	7.0	Scott Styris	6	25	42	West Indies	Queen's Park Oval, Port of Spain, Trinidad & Tobago	12 June 2002
5	7.2	Daniel Vettori	5	7	42	Bangladesh	Queenstown Events Centre, Queenstown, New Zealand	31 December 2007
Last updated: 1 July 2020

==== Worst figures in an innings ====
The worst figures in an ODI came in the 5th One Day International between South Africa at home to Australia in 2006. Australia's Mick Lewis returned figures of 0/113 from his 10 overs in the second innings of the match. The worst figures by a New Zealand is 0/105 that came off the bowling of Tim Southee in the third game against India at Christchurch in March 2009.

Rank	Figures	Player	Overs	Opposition	Venue	Date
1	0/105	Tim Southee	10	India	AMI Stadium, Christchurch, New Zealand	8 March 2009
2	0/91	Matt Henry†	10	Australia	Manuka Oval, Canberra, Australia	6 December 2016
3	0/85	Chris Drum	9	India	Lal Bahadur Shastri Stadium, Hyderabad, India	8 November 1999
4	0/84	Lance Cairns	11	England	Old Trafford, Manchester, England	17 July 1978
5	0/82	Shane Bond	9	Sri Lanka	New Wanderers Stadium, Johannesburg, South Africa	27 September 2009
Last updated: 1 July 2020

==== Most runs conceded in a match ====
Mick Lewis also holds the dubious distinction of most runs conceded in an ODI during the aforementioned match. The top two New Zealand record in ODIs are held by Tim Southee and Martin Snedden.

Rank	Figures	Player	Overs	Opposition	Venue	Date
1	2/105	Martin Snedden	12	England	The Oval, London, England	9 June 1983 ‡
1	0/105	Tim Southee	10	India	AMI Stadium, Christchurch, New Zealand	8 March 2009
3	3/100	Jacob Duffy	10	India	Holkar Cricket Stadium, Indore, India	24 January 2023
4	1/96	Corey Anderson	10	Pakistan	Sharjah Cricket Stadium, Sharjah, United Arab Emirates	14 December 2014
5	2/93	Mitchell McClenaghan	10	England	Edgbaston, Birmingham, England	9 June 2015
Last updated:1 July 2020

==== Most wickets in a calendar year ====
Pakistan's Saqlain Mushtaq holds the record for most wickets taken in a year when he took 69 wickets in 1997 in 36 ODIs. Chris Pringle is the highest New Zealand on the list having taken 46 wickets in 1994.

Rank	Wickets	Player	Matches	Year
1	46	Chris Pringle	26	1994
2	43	Daniel Vettori	31	2007
3	40	Mitchell McClenaghan	15	2013
4	38	Trent Boult	20	2019
5	36	Ewen Chatfield	25	1983
5	36	Trent Boult	17	2015
Last updated: 1 July 2020

==== Most wickets in a series ====
1998–99 Carlton and United Series involving Australia, England and Sri Lanka and the 2019 Cricket World Cup saw the records set for the most wickets taken by a bowler in an ODI series when Australian pacemen Glenn McGrath and Mitchell Starc achieved a total of 27 wickets during the series, respectively. New Zealand's Trent Boult is joint 10th with his 22 wickets taken during the 2019 Cricket World Cup.

Rank	Wickets	Player	Matches	Series
1	22	Trent Boult	9	2019 Cricket World Cup
2	21	Shane Bond	9	2001-02 VB Series
2	21	Lockie Ferguson†	9	2019 Cricket World Cup
4	20	Geoff Allott	9	1999 Cricket World Cup
5	18	Chris Pringle	10	1990-91 Australian Tri-Series
5	18	Tim Southee	8	2011 Cricket World Cup
Last updated: 1 July 2020

==== Hat-trick ====
In cricket, a hat-trick occurs when a bowler takes three wickets with consecutive deliveries. The deliveries may be interrupted by an over bowled by another bowler from the other end of the pitch or the other team's innings, but must be three consecutive deliveries by the individual bowler in the same match. Only wickets attributed to the bowler count towards a hat-trick; run outs do not count. In ODIs history there have been just 49 hat-tricks, the first achieved by Jalal-ud-Din for Pakistan against Australia in 1982.

No.	Bowler	Against	Dismissals	Venue	Date	Ref.
1	Danny Morrison	India	• Kapil Dev (b) • Salil Ankola (b) • Nayan Mongia (b)	(New Zealand) McLean Park, Napier	25 March 1994	
2	Shane Bond	Australia	• Cameron White (c Craig McMillan) • Andrew Symonds (c †Brendon McCullum) • Nathan Bracken (b)	(Australia) Bellerive Oval, Hobart	14 January 2007	
3	Trent Boult	Pakistan	• Fakhar Zaman (b) • Babar Azam (c Ross Taylor) • Mohammad Hafeez (lbw)	(United Arab Emirates) Sheikh Zayed Cricket Stadium, Abu Dhabi	7 November 2018	
4	Trent Boult	Australia	• Usman Khawaja (b) • Mitchell Starc (b) • Jason Behrendorff (lbw)	(England) Lord's Cricket Ground, London	29 June 2019 ^{W}	

=== Wicket-keeping records ===
The wicket-keeper is a specialist fielder who stands behind the stumps being guarded by the batsman on strike and is the only member of the fielding side allowed to wear gloves and leg pads.

==== Most career dismissals ====
A wicket-keeper can be credited with the dismissal of a batsman in two ways, caught or stumped. A fair catch is taken when the ball is caught fully within the field of play without it bouncing after the ball has touched the striker's bat or glove holding the bat, Laws 5.6.2.2 and 5.6.2.3 state that the hand or the glove holding the bat shall be regarded as the ball striking or touching the bat while a stumping occurs when the wicket-keeper puts down the wicket while the batsman is out of his ground and not attempting a run. New Zealand's Brendon McCullum is sixth in taking most dismissals in ODIs as a designated wicket-keeper with Sri Lanka's Kumar Sangakkara and Australian Adam Gilchrist heading the list.

Rank	Dismissals	Player	Matches	Innings	Dis/Inn	Period
1	242	Brendon McCullum	260	183	1.322	2002–2016
2	136	Adam Parore	179	147	0.925	1992–2002
4	126	Tom Latham†	162	106	1.188	2012–2025
3	110	Luke Ronchi	81	79	1.392	2013–2017
5	85	Ian Smith	98	96	0.885	1980–1992
Last updated: 16 November 2025

==== Most career catches ====
McCullum is 5th in taking most catches in ODIs as a designated wicket-keeper.

Rank	Catches	Player	Matches	Innings	Period
1	227	Brendon McCullum	260	183	2002–2016
2	111	Adam Parore	179	147	1992–2002
3	109	Tom Latham†	162	106	2012–2025
4	100	Luke Ronchi	81	79	2013–2017
5	80	Ian Smith	98	96	1980–1992
Last updated: 16 November 2025

==== Most career stumpings ====
Dhoni holds the record for the most stumpings in ODIs with 123 followed by Sri Lankans Sangakkara and Romesh Kaluwitharana.

Rank	Stumpings	Player	Matches	Innings	Period
1	25	Adam Parore	179	147	1992–2002
2	17	Tom Latham†	162	106	2012–2025
3	15	Brendon McCullum	260	183	2002–2016
4	10	Luke Ronchi	81	79	2013–2017
5	9	Lee Gormon	37	37	1994–1997
Last updated: 9 March 2025

==== Most dismissals in an innings ====
Ten wicket-keepers on 15 occasions have taken six dismissals in a single innings in an ODI. Adam Gilchrist of Australia alone has done it six times.

The feat of taking 5 dismissals in an innings has been achieved by 49 wicket-keepers on 87 occasions including four New Zealanders.

Rank	Dismissals	Player	Opposition	Venue	Date
1	5	Adam Parore	West Indies	Nehru Stadium, Fatorda, IND	26 October 1994
1	5	Brendon McCullum	India	McLean Park, Napier, NZ	29 December 2002
1	5	Brendon McCullum	India	AMI Stadium, Christchurch, NZ	1 January 2003
1	5	Brendon McCullum	South Africa	McLean Park, Napier, NZ	2 March 2004
1	5	Gareth Hopkins	Ireland	Mannofield Park, Aberdeen, Scotland	1 July 2008
1	5	Brendon McCullum	Bangladesh	McLean Park, Napier, NZ	5 February 2010
1	5	Brendon McCullum	Pakistan	Basin Reserve, Wellington, NZ	22 January 2011
1	5	Tom Latham†	Australia	Eden Park, Auckland, NZ	30 January 2017
1	5	Tom Latham†	Afghanistan	The Cooper Associates County Ground, Taunton, ENG	8 June 2019 ‡
Last updated: 1 July 2020

==== Most dismissals in a series ====
Gilchrist also holds the ODIs record for the most dismissals taken by a wicket-keeper in a series. He made 27 dismissals during the 1998-99 Carlton & United Series. New Zealand record is held by Tom Latham when he made 21 dismissals during the 2019 Cricket World Cup.

Rank	Dismissals	Player	Matches	Innings	Series
1	21	Tom Latham†	10	10	2019 Cricket World Cup
2	19	Brendon McCullum	7	7	India in New Zealand in 2003
3	16	Adam Parore	10	10	2001-02 VB Series
4	14	Brendon McCullum	10	10	2007 Cricket World Cup
5	13	Luke Ronchi	7	6	Sri Lankan cricket team in New Zealand in 2014-15
5	13	Luke Ronchi	9	9	2015 Cricket World Cup
Last updated: 1 July 2020

=== Fielding records ===
==== Most career catches ====
Caught is one of the nine methods a batsman can be dismissed in cricket. (Note: In 2017, The Laws of Cricket were amended, reducing the methods of dismissals from ten to nine, with handled the ball now covered as part of obstructing the field.) The majority of catches are caught in the slips, located behind the batsman, next to the wicket-keeper, on the off side of the field. Most slip fielders are top order batsmen.

Sri Lanka's Mahela Jayawardene holds the record for the most catches in ODIs by a non-wicket-keeper with 218, followed by Ricky Ponting of Australia on 160 and New Zealand Mohammad Azharuddin with 156.Ross Taylor is the leading catcher for New Zealand.

Rank	Catches	Player	Matches	Period
1	142	Ross Taylor	236	2006–2022
2	132	Stephen Fleming	279	1994–2007
3	96	Martin Guptill	186	2009–2022
4	93	Chris Harris	186	1990–2004
5	86	Daniel Vettori	291	1997–2015
Last updated: 25 November 2022

==== Most catches in an innings ====
South Africa's Jonty Rhodes is the only fielder to have taken five catches in an innings.

The feat of taking 4 catches in an innings has been achieved by 42 fielders on 44 occasions including seven New Zealand fielders.

Rank	Dismissals	Player	Opposition	Venue	Date
1	4	Ken Rutherford	India	McLean Park, Napier, New Zealand	16 February 1995
1	4	Chris Harris	India	Ranasinghe Premadasa Stadium, Colombo, Sri Lanka	20 July 2001
1	4	Stephen Fleming	England	Adelaide Oval, Adelaide, Australia	23 January 2007
1	4	Ross Taylor	India	Rangiri Dambulla International Stadium, Dambulla, Sri Lanka	10 August 2010
1	4	Jamie How	India	Nehru Stadium, Guwahati, India	28 November 2010
1	4	Nathan McCullum	England	SWALEC Stadium, Cardiff, England	16 June 2013
1	4	Martin Guptill	Pakistan	Eden Park, Auckland, New Zealand	31 January 2016
Last updated: 1 July 2020

==== Most catches in a series ====
The 2019 Cricket World Cup, which was won by England for the first time, saw the record set for the most catches taken by a non-wicket-keeper in an ODI series. Englishman batsman and captain of the England Test team Joe Root took 13 catches in the series as well as scored 556 runs. Jeremy Coney with 11 catches in 1980-81 Benson & Hedges World Series is the leading New Zealand on this list.

Rank	Catches	Player	Matches	Innings	Series
1	11	Jeremy Coney	11	11	1980-81 Benson & Hedges World Series
2	10	Stephen Fleming	7	7	India in New Zealand in 2003
3	9	Martin Crowe	10	10	1980-81 Benson & Hedges World Series
3	9	Ross Taylor	5	5	2009 ICC Champions Trophy
5	8	Chris Harris	8	8	1997–98 Carlton and United Series
5	8	Stephen Fleming	8	8	2006–07 Commonwealth Bank Series
5	8	Ross Taylor	4	4	Sri Lanka Triangular Series in 2010
5	8	Martin Guptill	10	10	2019 Cricket World Cup
Last updated: 1 July 2020

=== All-round Records ===
==== 1000 runs and 100 wickets ====
A total of 64 players have achieved the double of 1000 runs and 100 wickets in their ODI career.

Rank	Player	Average Difference	Period	Matches	Runs	Bat Avg	Wickets	Bowl Avg
1	Richard Hadlee	0.05	1973–1990	115	1,751	21.61	158	21.56
2	Scott Styris	-2.83	1999–2011	188	4,483	32.48	200	32.78
3	Chris Cairns	-3.55	1991–2006	214	4,881	29.22	200	32.78
4	Jacob Oram	-5.07	2001–2012	160	2,434	24.09	173	29.17
5	Chris Harris	-8.50	1990–2004	250	4,379	29.00	203	37.50
6	Kyle Mills	-11.39	2001–2015	170	1,047	15.62	240	27.02
7	Daniel Vettori	-14.77	1997–2015	291	2,201	17.19	297	31.96
Last updated: 1 July 2020

=== Other records ===
==== Most career matches ====
India's Sachin Tendulkar holds the record for the most ODI matches played with 463, with former captains Mahela Jayawardene and Sanath Jayasuriya being second and third having represented Sri Lanka on 443 and 441 occasions, respectively. Former New Zealand skippers Daniel Vettori and Stephen Fleming are top two most experienced New Zealand players having represented their national teams on 291 and 279 occasions, respectively.

Rank	Matches	Player	Runs	Wkts	Period
1	291	Daniel Vettori	2,201	297	1997–2015
2	279	Stephen Fleming	8,007	1	1994–2007
3	260	Brendon McCullum	6,083	–	2002–2016
4	250	Chris Harris	4,379	203	1990–2004
5	236	Ross Taylor	8,607	0	2006–2022
Last updated: 4 April 2022

==== Most consecutive career matches ====
Tendulkar also holds the record for the most consecutive ODI matches played with 185.

Rank	Matches	Player	Period
1	122	Brendon McCullum	2004–2010
2	94	Chris Harris	1996–2000
3	84	Adam Parore	1996–2000
4	63	Luke Ronchi	2013–2016
Last updated: 3 June 2018

==== Most matches as captain ====
Ricky Ponting, who led the Australian cricket team from 2002 to 2012, holds the record for the most matches played as captain in ODIs with 230 (including 1 as captain of ICC World XI team).Stephen Fleming has led New Zealand in 218 matches, second highest behind Ponting.

Rank	Matches	Player	Won	Lost	Tied	NR	Win %	Period
1	218	Stephen Fleming	98	106	1	13	48.04	1997–2007
2	91	Kane Williamson	46	40	1	4	50.54	2012–2023
3	82	Daniel Vettori	41	33	1	7	55.33	2004–2011
4	62	Brendon McCullum	36	22	1	3	61.86	2009–2016
5	60	Geoff Howarth	31	26	0	3	54.38	1980–1985
Last updated: 13 October 2023

==== Most man of the match awards ====
Rank	M.O.M Awards	Player	Matches	Period
1	25	Nathan Astle	223	1995–2007
2	22	Martin Guptill	198	2009–2022
3	19	Martin Crowe	143	1982–1995
4	17	Ross Taylor	236	2006–2022
4	17	Stephen Fleming	279	1994–2007
Last updated: 19 January 2023

==== Most man of the series awards ====
Rank	M.O.S Awards	Player	Matches	Period
1	5	Kane Williamson†	171	2010–2025
2	3	Martin Guptill	198	2009–2022
3	2	Devon Conway†	36	2021–2023
3	2	Shane Bond	82	2002–2010
3	2	Tom Latham†	155	2012–2025
3	2	Stephen Fleming	279	1994–2007
3	2	Will Young†	43	2021–2025
Last updated: 2 March 2025

==== Youngest players on Debut ====
The youngest player to play in an ODI match is claimed to be Hasan Raza at the age of 14 years and 233 days. Making his debut for Sri Lanka against Zimbabwe on 30 October 1996, there is some doubt as to the validity of Raza's age at the time.

Rank	Age	Player	Opposition	Venue	Date
1	18 years and 57 days	Daniel Vettori	Sri Lanka	Lancaster Park, Christchurch, New Zealand	25 March 1997
2	18 years and 306 days	Brendon Bracewell	England	Old Trafford, Manchester, England	17 July 1978
3	19 years and 144 days	Martin Crowe	Australia	Eden Park, Auckland, New Zealand	13 February 1982
4	19 years and 146 days	Jeff Wilson	Australia	Carisbrook, Dunedin, New Zealand	19 March 1993
5	19 years and 152 days	Ken Rutherford	West Indies	Queens Sports Club, Port of Spain, Trinidad & Tobago	27 March 1985
Last updated: 1 July 2020

==== Oldest players on Debut ====
The Netherlands batsmen Nolan Clarke is the oldest debutant to appear in an ODI match. Playing in the 1996 Cricket World Cup against New Zealand in 1996 at Reliance Stadium in Vadodara, India he was aged 47 years and 240 days.

Rank	Age	Player	Opposition	Venue	Date
1	35 years and 0 days	Bevan Congdon	Pakistan	Lancaster Park, Christchurch, New Zealand	11 February 1973
2	33 years and 341 days	Graeme Aldridge	Zimbabwe	Harare Sports Club, harare, Zimbabwe	22 October 2011
3	33 years and 84 days	Barry Hadlee	England	Carisbrook, Dunedin, New Zealand	8 March 1975
4	32 years and 351 days	Robert Vance	England	McLean Park, Napier, New Zealand	16 March 1988
5	32 years and 325 days	Brian Hastings	Pakistan	Lancaster Park, Christchurch, New Zealand	11 February 1973
Last updated: 1 July 2020

==== Oldest players ====
The Netherlands batsmen Nolan Clarke is the oldest player to appear in an ODI match. Playing in the 1996 Cricket World Cup against South Africa in 1996 at Rawalpindi Cricket Stadium in Rawalpindi, Pakistan he was aged 47 years and 257 days.

Rank	Age	Player	Opposition	Venue	Date
1	40 years and 156 days	Bevan Congdon	England	Old Trafford, Manchester, England	17 July 1978
2	38 years and 326 days	Richard Hadlee	England	The Oval, London, England	25 May 1990
3	38 years and 218 days	Ewen Chatfield	Pakistan	Carisbrook, Dunedin, New Zealand	6 February 1989
4	38 years and 207 days	Dipak Patel	Sri Lanka	Lal Bahadur Shastri Stadium, Hyderabad, India	20 May 1997
5	38 years and 160 days	John Wright	Sri Lanka	Paikiasothy Saravanamuttu Stadium, Colombo, Sri Lanka	12 December 1992
Last updated: 1 July 2020

== Partnership records ==
In cricket, two batsmen are always present at the crease batting together in a partnership. This partnership will continue until one of them is dismissed, retires or the innings comes to a close.

=== Highest partnerships by wicket ===
A wicket partnership describes the number of runs scored before each wicket falls. The first wicket partnership is between the opening batsmen and continues until the first wicket falls. The second wicket partnership then commences between the not out batsman and the number three batsman. This partnership continues until the second wicket falls. The third wicket partnership then commences between the not out batsman and the new batsman. This continues down to the tenth wicket partnership. When the tenth wicket has fallen, there is no batsman left to partner so the innings is closed.

Wicket	Runs	First batsman	Second batsman	Opposition	Venue	Date	Scorecard
1st wicket	274	James Marshall	Brendon McCullum	Ireland	Mannofield Park, Aberdeen, Scotland	1 July 2008	Scorecard
2nd wicket	273*	Devon Conway	Rachin Ravindra	England	Narendra Modi Stadium, Ahmedabad, India	5 October 2023	Scorecard
3rd wicket	206	Kane Williamson	Ross Taylor	England	Rose Bowl, Southampton, England	14 June 2015	Scorecard
4th wicket	221*	Kane Williamson	Tom Latham	India	Eden Park, Auckland, India	25 November 2022	Scorecard
5th wicket	195	Kane Williamson	Ross Taylor	Zimbabwe	Queens Sports Club, Bulawayo, Zimbabwe	25 October 2011	Scorecard
6th wicket	267* ♠	Grant Elliott	Luke Ronchi	Sri Lanka	University Oval, Dunedin, New Zealand	23 January 2015	Scorecard
7th wicket	162	Michael Bracewell	Mitchell Santner	India	Rajiv Gandhi International Stadium, Hyderabad, India	18 January 2023	Scorecard
8th wicket	94	James Franklin	Nathan McCullum	India	Reliance Stadium, Vadodara, India	4 December 2010	Scorecard
9th wicket	84	James Neesham	Matt Henry	India	Punjab Cricket Association Stadium, Mohali, India	23 October 2016	Scorecard
10th wicket	76	Luke Ronchi	Mitchell McClenaghan	South Africa	Bay Oval, Mount Maunganui, New Zealand	24 October 2014	Scorecard
Last updated: 5 October 2023

=== Highest partnerships by runs ===
The highest ODI partnership by runs for any wicket is held by the West Indian pairing of Chris Gayle and Marlon Samuels who put together a second wicket partnership of 372 runs during the 2015 Cricket World Cup against Zimbabwe in February 2015. This broke the record of 331 runs set by Indian pair of Sachin Tendulkar and Rahul Dravid against New Zealand in 1999

Wicket	Runs	First batsman	Second batsman	Opposition	Venue	Date	Scorecard
1st wicket	274	James Marshall	Brendon McCullum	Ireland	Mannofield Park, Aberdeen, Scotland	1 July 2008	Scorecard
2nd wicket	273*	Devon Conway	Rachin Ravindra	England	Narendra Modi Stadium, Ahmedabad, India	5 October 2023	Scorecard
6th wicket	267	Grant Elliott	Luke Ronchi	Sri Lanka	University Oval, Dunedin, New Zealand	23 January 2015	Scorecard
1st wicket	236*	Martin Guptill	Tom Latham†	Zimbabwe	Harare Sports Club, Harare, Zimbabwe	4 August 2015	Scorecard
4th wicket	221	Kane Williamson†	Tom Latham†	India	Eden Park, Auckland, New Zealand	25 November 2022	Scorecard
Last updated: 5 October 2023

=== Highest overall partnership runs by a pair ===
Rank	Runs	Innings	Players	Highest	Average	100/50	T20I career span
1	3,814	118	Nathan Astle & Stephen Fleming	193	33.16	9/17	1995–2007
2	3,812	69	Ross Taylor & Kane Williamson	206	57.75	14/16	2010–2019
3	3,067	70	Martin Guptill & Kane Williamson	163	45.1	7/18	2010–2022
4	2,737	64	Martin Guptill & Brendon McCullum	166*	45.61	8/14	2009–2016
5	2,179	45	Martin Guptill & Ross Taylor	180	53.14	8/8	2009–2020
An asterisk (*) signifies an unbroken partnership (i.e. neither of the batsmen was dismissed before either the end of the allotted overs or the required score being reached). Last updated: 11 October 2022

== Umpiring records ==
=== Most matches umpired ===
An umpire in cricket is a person who officiates the match according to the Laws of Cricket. Two umpires adjudicate the match on the field, whilst a third umpire has access to video replays, and a fourth umpire looks after the match balls and other duties. The records below are only for on-field umpires.

Rudi Koertzen of South Africa holds the record for the most ODI matches umpired with 209. The current active Aleem Dar is currently at 208 matches. They are followed by New Zealand's Billy Bowden who officiated in 200 matches.

Rank	Matches	Umpire	Period
1	200	Billy Bowden	199–2016
2	100	Steve Dunne	1989–2002
3	96	Tony Hill	1998–2013
4	71	Doug Cowie	1992–2005
4	71	Chris Gaffaney	2010–2021
Last updated: 23 March 2021

== See also ==
- List of New Zealand Women's One Day International cricket records
- List of One Day International cricket records
- List of One Day International cricket hat-tricks
- List of New Zealand Test cricket records
- List of New Zealand Twenty20 International cricket records
- List of Cricket World Cup records
