= List of Hampshire County Cricket Club Twenty20 cricket records =

Established in 1863, Hampshire County Cricket Club has played Twenty20 cricket since 2003 to the present day. This is a list of Hampshire Twenty20 cricket records; that is, record team and individual performances in Twenty20 cricket for Hampshire County Cricket Club.

== Team ==
- Highest Total For: 249/8 v Derbyshire at the County Ground, Derby, 2017
- Highest Total Against: 241/5 by Somerset at County Ground, Taunton, 2024
- Lowest Total For: 74 v Somerset at County Ground, Taunton, 2023
- Lowest Total Against: 67 by Sussex at County Ground, Hove, 2004

== Batting ==
- Highest Score: 129* James Vince v Somerset, County Ground, Taunton, 2022
- Most Runs in Season: 710 James Vince, 2015

=== Most Twenty20 runs for Hampshire ===
Qualification - 1,000 runs

Player	Nationality	Runs
James Vince	England	6,972
Michael Carberry	England	3,066
Joe Weatherley	England	2,741
Sean Ervine	Zimbabwe	2,518
James Adams	England	2,393
Liam Dawson	England	1,885
Toby Albert	England	1,413
James Fuller	England	1,370
Neil McKenzie	South Africa	1,289
Ben McDermott	Australia	1,138
Michael Lumb	England	1,101

=== Hampshire Twenty20 centurions ===
- Listed in highest score order. When scores are equal, scores are listed in order of date
- QF denotes a Quarter Final

Player	Nationality	Runs	Opponent	Ground	Season
James Vince	England	129*	Somerset	County Ground, Taunton	2022
James Vince	England	125	Essex	Rose Bowl, Southampton	2026 QF
Michael Lumb	England	124*	Essex	Rose Bowl, Southampton	2009
Chris Lynn	Australia	108*	Northamptonshire	Edgbaston Cricket Ground, Birmingham	2025 SF
James Vince	England	107*	Worcestershire	New Road, Worcester	2015 QF
James Vince	England	103	Essex	County Cricket Ground, Chelmsford	2023
James Vince	England	102	Sussex	Ageas Bowl, Southampton	2021
James Adams	England	101*	Surrey	Rose Bowl, Southampton	2010
Shahid Afridi	Pakistan	101	Derbyshire	County Ground, Derby	2017 QF
James Adams	England	100*	Glamorgan	Rose Bowl, Southampton	2010
Michael Carberry	England	100*	Lancashire	Ageas Bowl, Southampton	2013 QF
James Vince	England	100	Kent	Ageas Bowl, Southampton	2022

=== Highest Partnership for each wicket ===
Correct as of the end of the 2026 T20 Blast

Wkt	Runs	Partnership	Opponent	Ground	Season
1st	145*	Ben McDermott & James Vince	Sussex	Ageas Bowl, Southampton	2023
2nd	170	Michael Lumb & Michael Carberry	Essex	Rose Bowl, Southampton	2009
3rd	144*	James Adams & Sean Ervine	Surrey	Rose Bowl, Southampton	2010
4th	114	Toby Albert & Hilton Cartwright	Glamorgan	Utilita Bowl, Southampton	2025
5th	95	George Bailey & Lewis McManus	Glamorgan	SSE SWALEC Stadium, Cardiff	2017
6th	112	Ben Mayes & Hilton Cartwright	Sussex	County Ground, Hove	2026
7th	54*	Neil McKenzie & Dimitri Mascarenhas	Nottinghamshire	Trent Bridge, Nottingham	2012
8th	54	Gareth Berg & Kyle Abbott	Glamorgan	Ageas Bowl, Southampton	2018
9th	33	Michael Neser & Chris Wood	Somerset	County Ground, Taunton	2024
10th	28	Chris Wood & John Turner	Sussex	County Cricket Ground, Hove	2024

== Bowling ==
- Best Bowling: 6/19 Shaheen Afridi v Middlesex at Ageas Bowl, Southampton, 2020
- Wickets in Season: 31, Danny Briggs, 2010

=== Most Twenty20 wickets for Hampshire ===
Qualification - 50 wickets

Player	Nationality	Wickets
Chris Wood	England	237
Liam Dawson	England	165
Danny Briggs	England	121
Dimitri Mascarenhas	England	94
Scott Currie	Scotland	81
Mason Crane	England	75
James Fuller	England	75
Brad Wheal	Scotland	54
Sean Ervine	Zimbabwe	50

== See also ==
- List of Hampshire CCC first-class cricket records
- List of Hampshire CCC List A cricket records
