= Jimmy Daley =

English cricketer (born 1973)

Jimmy Daley (born 24 September 1973) is a retired English cricketer. He was a right-handed batsman and a right-hand medium-pace bowler.

Born in Sunderland, Daley's debut came during the 1992 season, for Durham. He holds a top score of 159* which he achieved in Hampshire in 1994. His first-class career lasted until the 2002 season.
