= Ray East =

English cricketer

Personal information
- Full name: Raymond Eric East
- Born: 20 June 1947 (age 79); Manningtree, Essex, England
- Batting: Right-handed
- Bowling: Slow left-arm orthodox

Domestic team information
- Years: Team
- 1965–1984: Essex
- 1973: Marylebone Cricket Club
- 1991–1993: Suffolk

Career statistics
Competition	First-class	List A
Matches	410	280
Runs scored	7,178	1,139
Batting average	17.72	10.95
100s/50s	1/22	–/1
Top score	113	54
Balls bowled	66,037	10,982
Wickets	1,019	269
Bowling average	25.72	24.59
5 wickets in innings	49	5
10 wickets in match	10	–
Best bowling	8/30	6/18
Catches/stumpings	256/–	118/–
- Source: Cricinfo, 22 December 2021

Raymond Eric East (born 20 June 1947, in Manningtree) is an English former cricketer who played for Essex County Cricket Club.

East played county cricket and was noted for his slow left-arm spin bowling. He played alongside David Acfield for Essex as the team won trophies and competed in county and one-day cricket.

He played 405 matches for Essex from 1965 to 1984 and in 410 matches in all. He took 1019 wickets at 25.72, with five wickets in an innings 49 times, ten in a match ten times and a career best of 8 for 30. He scored 7178 runs at 17.72 in the lower order, with one hundred (113) and held 256 catches. He took 269 list A one-day wickets at 24.59 with a best of 6–18, although he once went for 79 in 8 overs in a Sunday league match.He often contributed important runs from batting at 9 or 10 and once shared a century partnership with John Lever at Westcliff

From 1984–88 he was captain/manager of Essex 2nd XI and he played for Suffolk in 1991 and 1992 and now coaches cricket at Ipswich School.

He was a member of the Derrick Robins XI that toured South Africa in 1973.
