= Stewart Hutton =

English cricketer

Personal information
- Full name: Stewart Hutton
- Born: 30 November 1969 (age 56); Stockton-on-Tees, County Durham, England
- Batting: Left-handed
- Bowling: Right-arm medium

Domestic team information
- Years: Team
- 1991–1998: Durham

Career statistics
Competition	First-class	List A
Matches	66	71
Runs scored	3,341	1,667
Batting average	29.56	27.32
100s/50s	4/13	1/5
Top score	172*	125
Balls bowled	25	–
Wickets	–	–
Bowling average	–	–
5 wickets in innings	–	–
10 wickets in match	–	–
Best bowling	–	–
Catches/stumpings	34/–	20/–
- Source: Cricinfo, 30 May 2012

Stewart Hutton (born 13 November 1969) is a former English cricketer. Hutton was a left-handed batsman who bowled right-arm medium pace. He was born at Stockton-on-Tees, County Durham.

Hutton made his debut for Durham in the 1991 Minor Counties Championship, playing in three matches in the competition, against Northumberland, Norfolk and Suffolk. He recorded two half centuries in these matches. He was one of the few players retained by Durham who had played minor counties cricket following their elevation to first-class status for the 1992 season. He made his first-class debut midway through that season against Essex in the County Championship. He made eight first-class appearances in that season, scoring 406 runs at an average of 27.06. He made two half centuries, with his highest score of 78 coming in his second match against Sussex at Horsham. He also made his List A debut in that season against Warwickshire at Edgbaston in the Sunday League. He made two further appearances in that format in 1992, against Glamorgan and Worcestershire.
