= Stuart Turner (cricketer) =

English cricketer (born 1943)

Personal information
- Full name: Stuart Turner
- Born: 18 July 1943 (age 83); Chester, Cheshire, England
- Batting: Right-handed
- Bowling: Right-arm medium-fast

Domestic team information
- Years: Team
- 1988: Minor Counties
- 1987–1995: Cambridgeshire
- 1976/77–1977/78: Natal
- 1965–1986: Essex

Career statistics
Competition	First-class	List A
Matches	361	379
Runs scored	9,411	4,333
Batting average	22.84	18.67
100s/50s	4/41	0/11
Top score	121	87
Balls bowled	53,455	18,040
Wickets	821	470
Bowling average	26.00	22.98
5 wickets in innings	27	1
10 wickets in match	1	n/a
Best bowling	6/26	5/35
Catches/stumpings	217/–	106/–
- Source: Cricinfo, 1 December 2011

Stuart Turner (born 18 July 1943) is a former English cricketer. Turner was a right-handed batsman who bowled right-arm medium-fast. He was born in Chester, Cheshire.

Turner was a key player for Essex County Cricket Club during their emergence as a force in domestic cricket, towards the twilight of his career they won the County Championship four times in eight seasons. His accuracy, combined with his ability to swing the ball both ways saw him pick up 821 First-class wickets in a career that spanned over twenty years. He was also an adept batsman, capable of scoring centuries from the lower middle order.

After retirement from professional cricket, Turner took up coaching and taught at Forest School, Walthamstow until his retirement in 2011.
