= List of New Zealand Women's One Day International cricket records =

This is a List of New Zealand Women's One Day International cricket records, that is record team and individual performances in by the New Zealand women's national cricket team in One Day International (ODI) cricket. This list is based on the List of women's One Day International cricket records

== Key ==
The top ten records are listed for each category. Tied records for the tenth place are listed as well. Explanations of the general symbols and cricketing terms used in the list are given below. Specific details are provided in each category where appropriate.

Symbol	Meaning
‡	Player is currently active in WODI cricket
*	Player remained not out or partnership remained unbroken
♠	World record

ICC Women's ODI Team Rankings
Team	Matches	Points	Rating
Australia	28	4,565	163
England	24	3,061	128
India	30	3,712	124
South Africa	36	3,614	100
New Zealand	22	2,056	93
Sri Lanka	21	1,859	89
Bangladesh	21	1,537	73
Pakistan	21	1,524	73
West Indies	23	1,639	71
Ireland	19	947	50
Scotland	7	294	42
Zimbabwe	17	221	13
Papua New Guinea	9	110	12
United Arab Emirates	8	81	10
Source: ICC Women's ODI Team Rankings, 4 May 2026

== Team records ==
=== Team wins, losses, and ties ===
==== Matches played (total) ====
Mat	Won	Lost	Tied	NR	Win %
332	170	154	2	6	52.45
Note: Win percentage excludes no result matches and counts ties as half wins i.e. [won÷(matches – noresult)×100]. Source: Cricinfo. Last updated: 6 February 2019.

==== Matches played (by country) ====
Team	First Match	Mat	Won	Lost	Tied	NR	Win %
Australia	1973	123	31	90	0	2	25.61
Denmark	1993	1	1	0	0	0	100.00
England	1973	70	34	34	1	1	50.00
India	1978	48	28	19	1	0	59.37
ICC XI	1973	4	3	1	0	0	75.00
Ireland	1988	20	18	0	0	2	100.00
Netherlands	1984	9	9	0	0	0	100.00
Pakistan	1997	13	12	1	0	0	92.30
South Africa	1999	13	11	2	0	0	84.61
Sri Lanka	1997	10	10	0	0	0	100.00
Trinidad and Tobago	1973	1	1	0	0	0	100.00
West Indies	1993	19	11	7	0	1	61.11
Young England	1973	1	1	0	0	0	100.00
Source: Cricinfo. Last updated: 6 February 2019.

== Individual records ==
=== Individual records (batting) ===
==== Most career runs ====
Runs	Batsman	Innings	Average	ODI career span
4392	Suzie Bates‡	121	42.64	2006–present
4064	Debbie Hockley	118	41.89	1982-2000
3821	Amy Satterthwaite‡	119	38.98	2007–present
2919	Haidee Tiffen	111	30.72	1999-2009
2844	Emily Drumm	94	35.11	1992-2006
Source: Cricinfo. Last updated: May 10, 2019.

=== Individual records (bowling) ===
==== Most career wickets ====
Wickets	Bowler	Matches	Bowling average	ODI career span
92	Aimee Watkins	103	31.04	2002-2011
88	Nicola Browne	125	34.14	2002-2014
78	Catherine Campbell	85	25.87	1988-2000
74	Rachel Pullar	51	16.48	1997-2005
74	Suzie Bates‡	121	33.29	2006–present
Source: Cricinfo. Last updated: May 10, 2019.

== See also ==
- List of women's One Day International cricket records
- List of New Zealand One Day International cricket records
