= Cecil Paris =

English cricketer

Personal information
- Full name: Cecil Gerard Alexander Paris
- Born: 20 September 1911; Kirkee, Bombay Presidency, British India
- Died: 4 April 1998 (aged 86); Winchester, Hampshire, England
- Batting: Right-handed
- Bowling: Right-arm off break

Domestic team information
- Years: Team
- 1933–1948: Hampshire
- 1939: Marylebone Cricket Club

Career statistics
| Competition | First-class |
|---|---|
| Matches | 100 |
| Runs scored | 3,730 |
| Batting average | 22.88 |
| 100s/50s | 2/19 |
| Top score | 134* |
| Balls bowled | 438 |
| Wickets | 4 |
| Bowling average | 54.00 |
| 5 wickets in innings | – |
| 10 wickets in match | – |
| Best bowling | 1/10 |
| Catches/stumpings | 75/– |
- Source: ESPNcricinfo, 25 August 2009

Cecil Gerard Alexander Paris (20 August 1911 — 4 April 1998) was an amateur English first-class cricketer who played for Hampshire County Cricket Club eitherside of the Second World War, including as captain in 1938. Later in his life, he was a prominent cricket administrator. He was the first chairman of the Test and County Cricket Board and succeeded the Duke of Edinburgh as president of the Marylebone Cricket Club in 1975. He also held every administrative office at Hampshire until 1989. During the Second World War, Paris was a liaison officer for General Bernard Montgomery and was awarded the Czechoslovak War Cross. By profession, he was a solicitor and was a partner in his family's long-established Southampton law firm.

== Cricket and military service ==
The son of soldier Alexander Lloyd Paris, he was born in British India at Kirkee in August 1911. He was educated in England at The King's School, Canterbury, where he captained the school cricket team. Paris made his debut in first-class cricket for Hampshire against Worcestershire at Bournemouth in the 1933 County Championship, in what was his only appearance that season. He became a regular member of the Hampshire team under the captaincy of Lionel Tennyson, making sixteen appearances in 1934, which decreased to 12 appearances in 1935. It was in 1935 that he played for the Gentlemen in the Gentlemen v Players fixture at Folkestone. He scored his maiden first-class century against Northampton in 1935, making 134 not out, with Wisden remarking that in his innings he hit "all round the wicket with marked skill and accuracy of timing". Later in that season, during an innings defeat at Portsmouth against Yorkshire, Paris scored 51 of Hampshire's 94 runs in their second innings. He was appointed vice-captain to Dick Moore in 1936, making 21 appearances during the season. The following season he featured in just fifteen matches, before making 28 appearances in 1938 when he took over the captaincy from Moore; this was the only season in which he passed 1,000 runs, though he failed to record a century during it. The official history of Hampshire County Cricket Club notes that he "captained the side with immense concentration and effort", but despite this Hampshire found themselves finishing in 14th place by the end of the season and Paris was replaced as captain for 1939 by George Taylor. He played just two County Championship matches in 1939, in addition to playing for the Marylebone Cricket Club (MCC) against Surrey at Lord's.

Paris served in the British Army during the Second World War, being commissioned into the Royal Artillery as a second lieutenant in June 1939. He gained the war substantive rank of captain in October 1941, having graduated from the intermediate staff course prior to this appointment; he was conferred the temporary rank of major at the same time. He later served in the war as a liaison officer for General Bernard Montgomery. During his role as liaison officer between Montgomery and the 1st Czechoslovak Armoured Brigade under Major General Alois Liška, Paris was awarded the Czechoslovak War Cross, the Czechoslovak version of the British Military Cross. After the war, Paris maintained his connection with the Royal Artillery by serving in the Territorial Army. He received the Territorial Decoration in September 1950, at which point he still held the rank of captain; he would eventually retire from the Reserve of Officers in May 1962, with the rank of honorary major.

Following the war, he briefly returned to first-class for Hampshire in the 1948 County Championship, making four appearances. In total, Paris made 98 first-class appearances for Hampshire. In these, he scored 3,660 runs at an average of 22.87; he made two centuries and 18 half centuries. A capable fielder, he took 75 catches in his 100 first-class matches. Besides playing cricket, he also played squash and rugby union (for the Hampshire county team in the latter).

== Administrative career and later life ==
Paris was the first chairman of the Test and County Cricket Board (TCCB), formed in 1968. His chairmanship was seen by John Arlott as beneficial to the nascent Professional Cricketers' Association, with Paris recognising its potential before many players did so; he secured a £750 annual grant to keep the association alive until membership amongst players became the norm. An early challenge to his chairmanship of the TCCB came in 1969, when ITV took the TCCB to the High Court for alleged breach of contract when the broadcasting contract for cricket went to the BBC; the High Court found in favour of the TCCB. Other challenges during his twelve-month chairmanship included facilitating the expansion of one-day cricket and the D'Oliveira affair. J. A. Bailey noted that he "handled skilfully the need to balance change with cricket's essential regard for tradition". Following the end of his twelve-month tenure, the chairmanship passed to Maurice Allom. In 1975, he was nominated by the Duke of Edinburgh to succeed him as president of the MCC, and conversely, chairman of the International Cricket Conference. He was succeeded at the end of his one-year tenure by William Webster. In an administrative capacity for Hampshire, Paris also held every office of note at the club: cricket chairman; club chairman; and president from 1984 to 1989. Following the end of his presidency, Paris became a patron of the club alongside Lord Denning.

By profession, Paris was a solicitor, having passed his law examination with third-class honours in August 1935. He became a partner in his family's well-established law-firm Paris, Smith and Randall in Southampton in 1938, the same year that he had assumed the Hampshire captaincy. His association with the firm lasted until his retirement in 1982. Paris was involved in philanthropy alongside Sir Donald Acheson during the 1980s, helping to raise £4 million for a CT scanner for the Wessex region. Paris died at Winchester in April 1998. He had been married to Winifred Anna Blanche Richardson, having married her in September 1937 at Corbridge, Northumberland. Following his death, the Cecil Paris Memorial Fund was founded under the auspices of the Hampshire County Cricket Youth Trust, where money raised through the fund would be used to support Hampshire's community and ethnic coaching programmes.

Sporting positions
| Preceded by Dick Moore | Hampshire cricket captain 1938 | Succeeded by George Taylor |
