= Geoffrey Lowndes =

English cricketer (1898–1982)

Personal information
- Full name: William Geoffrey Lowndes Frith Lowndes
- Born: 24 January 1898; Wandsworth, London, England
- Died: 23 May 1982 (aged 84); Newbury, Berkshire, England
- Batting: Right-handed
- Bowling: Right-arm medium-fast
- Relatives: William Frith (father)

Domestic team information
- Years: Team
- 1921: Oxford University
- 1924–1935: Hampshire
- 1928–1934: Marylebone Cricket Club

Career statistics
Competition	First-class
Matches	79
Runs scored	3,244
Batting average	24.02
100s/50s	5/14
Top score	216
Balls bowled	6,048
Wickets	78
Bowling average	38.50
5 wickets in innings	–
10 wickets in match	–
Best bowling	3/5
Catches/stumpings	38/–
- Source: Cricinfo, 25 August 2009

William Geoffrey Lowndes Frith Lowndes (born William Geoffrey Lowndes Frith; 24 January 1898 – 23 May 1982), known as Geoffrey Lowndes, was an English first-class cricketer. He played first-class cricket from 1921 to 1936, the majority of which was for Hampshire. He succeeded Lord Tennyson as Hampshire captain in 1934, holding the captaincy for two seasons.

== Early life and cricket ==
The son of William Frith, also a cricketer (who changed his surname and that of his issue from Frith to Frith Lowndes in July 1906), he was born at Wandsworth in February 1898. He was educated at Eton College, before joining the British Army in the final two years of the First World War, being commissioned as a temporary second lieutenant in December 1916, with appointment to the 21st Lancers in August 1917. Lowndes later served in the Third Anglo-Afghan War, which followed the First World War.

After completing his military service, Lowndes matriculated to New College, Oxford. There, he played first-class cricket for Oxford University Cricket Club, making his debut in 1921 against the Free Foresters at Oxford. He was a late inclusion in the Oxford side for the match, with his performance (three wickets and scores of 21 and 29) securing him a place in the Oxford side for their next match against the British Army cricket team, where he scored 88 in the Oxford first innings. His performances in these two trial matches secured him a place in the Oxford side in four further matches in the 1921 season, including playing in The University Match at Lord's. Against H. D. G. Leveson Gower's XI at Eastbourne, he made a double century with a score of 216, sharing in a partnership of 218 in a little over 90 minutes for the fourth wicket with Humphrey Ward. After graduating from Oxford, Lowndes played for the Free Foresters against Oxford University in 1923.

== Hampshire captaincy and later life ==
Lowndes played for Hampshire twice in the 1924 County Championship against Middlesex and Kent. He was a regular member of H. D. G. Leveson Gower's XI, first playing for his eleven in 1926. Lowndes would make twelve first-class appearances for his team, scoring 494 runs. In the 1920s, he also played for the Marylebone Cricket Club (MCC) against Ireland at Dublin, and for the Harlequins against the touring West Indians at Eastbourne. In the early 1930s, he played for an England XI against the touring New Zealanders and West Indians, in addition to playing for the Gentlemen in the Gentlemen v Players fixture at Folkestone in 1933. Having played intermittently for Hampshire since his debut for the county, Lowndes was persuaded by Lord Tennyson to succeed him as Hampshire captain in 1934. The Hampshire side he inherited was in a state of transition, so had little success, nevertheless, he was a popular captain amongst his contemporaries. He played first-class cricket for Hampshire until 1935, after which he was succeeded as captain by Dick Moore. He made a final first-class appearance in 1936, for the Free Foresters against Oxford University.

Lowndes played the majority (41 matches) of his first-class cricket for Hampshire, scoring 1,558 runs at an average of 21.94; he made four centuries, with a highest score of 143. His most notable innings of 140 came against the touring Australians in 1934, reaching his century in 75 minutes and adding 247 runs in under three hours for the fourth wicket with Phil Mead. Overall, in 79 first-class matches, he scored 3,244 runs at an average of 24.02, recording five centuries. Lowndes was described by Wisden as an "attacking batsman and a particularly fine driver, at his best on fast wickets". He also a capable fast-medium away-swing bowler, whom Wisden noted "sometimes took the new ball and might perhaps have used himself more". He took 78 wickets at a bowling average of 38.50, with best figures of 3 for 5. Lowndes played the game in an amateur spirit – playing more for fun and the enjoyment of others.

In 1943, Lowndes was alleged to have engaged in an affair with Joan Holroyd Akers-Douglas, wife of the Kent cricketer Ian Akers-Douglas; their marriage ended in divorce as a result. In September 1949, he played an exhibition match for the Duke of Edinburgh's XI at Bournemouth. Lowndes died at Newbury in May 1982, aged 84. At the time of his death, he was the last survivor of the 1921 Oxford University team.

Sporting positions
Preceded by Lionel Tennyson	Hampshire cricket captain 1934–1935	Succeeded by Dick Moore
