= William Frith (English cricketer) =

English cricketer (1871–1956)

Personal information
- Full name: William Frederick Lowndes Frith
- Born: 1 July 1871; Wandsworth, London, England
- Died: 6 October 1956 (aged 85); West Wittering, Sussex, England
- Batting: Unknown
- Bowling: Unknown
- Relatives: Geoffrey Lowndes (son)

Domestic team information
- Years: Team
- 1908–1913: Buckinghamshire
- 1901–1902: London County

Career statistics
Competition	First-class
Matches	2
Runs scored	4
Batting average	4.00
100s/50s	–/–
Top score	4
Balls bowled	48
Wickets	1
Bowling average	23.00
5 wickets in innings	–
10 wickets in match	–
Best bowling	1/23
Catches/stumpings	–/–
- Source: Cricinfo, 10 May 2011

Plaque marking Lowndes's donation of parkland to the Buckinghamshire town of Chesham in 1953.

William Frederick Lowndes Frith MBE (8 July 1871 – 6 October 1956) was an English cricketer. Frith's batting and bowling styles are unknown. He was born at Wandsworth, London. He changed his name to William Frederick Lowndes Frith-Lowndes (to "use the surname of Lowndes in addition to and after that of Frith") in July 1906.

Frith made his first-class debut for London County against Cambridge University in 1901. He played a further first-class match for the London County in 1902 against Leicestershire. He scored 4 runs and took a single wicket for the cost of 23 runs. His debut for Buckinghamshire came in the 1908 Minor Counties Championship against the Surrey Second XI. He played Minor counties cricket for Buckinghamshire from 1908 to 1913, which included 30 Minor Counties Championship matches.

He was appointed MBE in the post-war civilian honours in 1920, as "National Service Representative, Chesham". He died at West Wittering, Sussex, on 6 October 1956. He was survived by his son Geoffrey Lowndes, who played first-class cricket for Oxford University, Hampshire and the Marylebone Cricket Club.

Firth helped plant one of the 'Victory Oaks' in Lowndes Park in Chesham in 1919. First and his wife Ethel Maude, lived at The Bury in Chesham and donated the extensive grounds of the house to the people of Chesham in 1953.
