= Dick Moore (cricketer) =

English cricketer

Personal information
- Full name: Richard Henry Moore
- Born: 14 November 1913; Charminster, Dorset, England
- Died: 1 March 2002 (aged 88); Llanrhos, Denbighshire, Wales
- Batting: Right-handed
- Bowling: Right-arm medium

Domestic team information
- Years: Team
- 1931–1939: Hampshire

Career statistics
Competition	First-class
Matches	137
Runs scored	6,026
Batting average	26.08
100s/50s	10/19
Top score	316
Balls bowled	1,705
Wickets	25
Bowling average	39.12
5 wickets in innings	–
10 wickets in match	–
Best bowling	3/46
Catches/stumpings	117/–
- Source: Cricinfo, 27 August 2021

Richard Henry Moore (14 November 1913 – 1 March 2002) was an English first-class cricketer. Moore debuted as a 17-year-old for Hampshire County Cricket Club in 1931 and made nearly 130 appearances for the county during the 1930s. He was appointed Hampshire captain for 1936 and 1937, succeeding Geoffrey Lowndes. An opening batsman who passed 1,000 runs for the season on three occasions, his best innings of note came in 1937, when he scored 316 runs in a single day against Warwickshire at Bournemouth, which remains as of 2026 the highest individual first-class score for Hampshire. With business commitments taking up more of his time, he relinquished the captaincy to Cecil Paris in 1938, but continued to play for Hampshire less frequently before the start of the Second World War.

== Life and cricket career ==
Moore was born in the Bournemouth suburb of Charminster in November 1913. He was educated at Bournemouth Grammar School. Shortly after completing his education there, he debuted, aged 17, for Hampshire in first-class cricket against Leicestershire at Bournemouth in the 1931 County Championship. Having appeared twice in 1931, Moore became a more regular member of the Hampshire team in 1932, but it was not until the last game of the 1933 season against Essex that Moore recorded his maiden first-class century with a score of 159. Possessing a mixture of attacking and defensive strokeplay, he had a successful season in 1934, when he passed 1,500 runs for the season as an opening batsman, making two centuries, one of which equalled his 159 the previous season. Wisden commenting on his 1934 season, noted that he was "probably the most promising young amateur in English cricket". However, the following year he was struck down with scarlet fever and missed the entirety of the 1935 season.

He returned for the 1936 season and was duly elected captain, replacing Geoffrey Lowndes. Much in the same vein as Edward Sprot over 20-years prior, his captaincy was characterised by an enterprising, positive approach, which encouraged the acceptance of challenges in the pursuit of victory, even though some ended in defeat. In his first season as captain, he led Hampshire from 16th place to 10th in the County Championship. He again passed 1,000 runs for the season in 1936, scoring ten centuries and seven half centuries, despite a mid-season slump in form where he scored only 89 runs in 17 innings. The following season, in which he again captained Hampshire, was his most successful. He passed 1,500 runs for a season for the second time and scored two centuries and four half centuries. He played his most famous innings in 1937 against Warwickshire at Bournemouth. Moore scored 316 runs in Hampshire's first innings, reaching his century before lunch on the first day and reached his triple century before the close of play at 7 p.m., when he was the last wicket of the day to fall. His innings included 43 fours and three sixes, and involved partnerships of 108 for the first wicket with Neil McCorkell and 207 for the fourth wicket with Cecil Paris. This was the highest individual first-class score for Hampshire, a record which still stands as of 2026.

Owing to business pressures outside of cricket, Moore handed the Hampshire captaincy over to Cecil Paris for the 1938 season, with his appearances in his final two seasons prior to the Second World War becoming less. In total, he made 129 appearances in first-class cricket for Hampshire, scoring 5,885 runs at an average of 26.99; he scored ten centuries, alongside 19 half centuries. In the field, he took 115 catches for Hampshire. As a part-time medium pace bowler, he took 25 wickets at a bowling average of 39.12, with best figures of 3 for 46. In addition to playing first-class cricket for Hampshire, Moore also made four appearances each for the Marylebone Cricket Club between 1936 and 1937, and for the Gentlemen in the Gentlemen v Players fixtures between 1934 and 1938.

Moore married a North Wales baker's daughter, and during the war he commanded a prisoner-of-war camp at Pool Park in Denbighshire. Following the war, he remained in the Denbighshire area, where he helped to organise a cricket festival at Penrhyn Avenue during the 1950s, which attracted some of the most famous cricketers of the day. His health failed him in later life, with Moore too unwell to attend the farewell dinner to Northlands Road in September 2000, prior to Hampshire's relocation to the Rose Bowl. He died in March 2002 at Llanrhos, Denbighshire.

Sporting positions
Preceded by Geoffrey Lowndes	Hampshire cricket captain 1936–1937	Succeeded by Cecil Paris
