= George Taylor (cricketer) =

English cricketer

Personal information
- Full name: George Rammell Taylor
- Born: 25 November 1909; Havant, Hampshire, England
- Died: 21 October 1986 (aged 76); Romsey, Hampshire, England
- Batting: Right-handed
- Bowling: Right-arm slow

Domestic team information
- Years: Team
- 1935–1939: Hampshire

Career statistics
Competition	First-class
Matches	24
Runs scored	306
Batting average	9.27
100s/50s	–/–
Top score	41
Balls bowled	21
Wickets	1
Bowling average	21.00
5 wickets in innings	–
10 wickets in match	–
Best bowling	1/8
Catches/stumpings	15/–
- Source: Cricinfo, 26 August 2009

George Rammell Taylor (born 25 November 1909 — 21 October 1986) was an English first-class cricketer who played for Hampshire.

Taylor was born at Havant in November 1909. He was educated at Lancing College, where he played for the college cricket team. Taylor was a right-handed batsman who usually batted in the lower order in first-class cricket and a slow right-arm occasional bowler. He made a single appearance for Hampshire during the 1935 County Championship, scoring 0 and 21 in a home match against Lancashire. In the 1939 season with no other amateur available for more than a few matches, Taylor captained Hampshire, though he did not appear in the final few matches of the season when Giles Baring was available to play and was worth a place in the team on merit. The move to appoint Taylor as captain was not a success, and the team won only two out of 23 matches under his captaincy. In his obituary in the 1987 edition of Wisden Cricketers' Almanack, it was noted that he "would never have claimed to be more than a club player". He ended his career with 306 runs from 37 innings at an average of 9.27 and with a highest score of just 41, made in the match against Lancashire.

A solicitor, Taylor died in Romsey, Hampshire in October 1986 at the age of 76.

Sporting positions
Preceded by Cecil Paris	Hampshire cricket captain 1939	Succeeded by Desmond Eagar
