= Alex Dibbs =

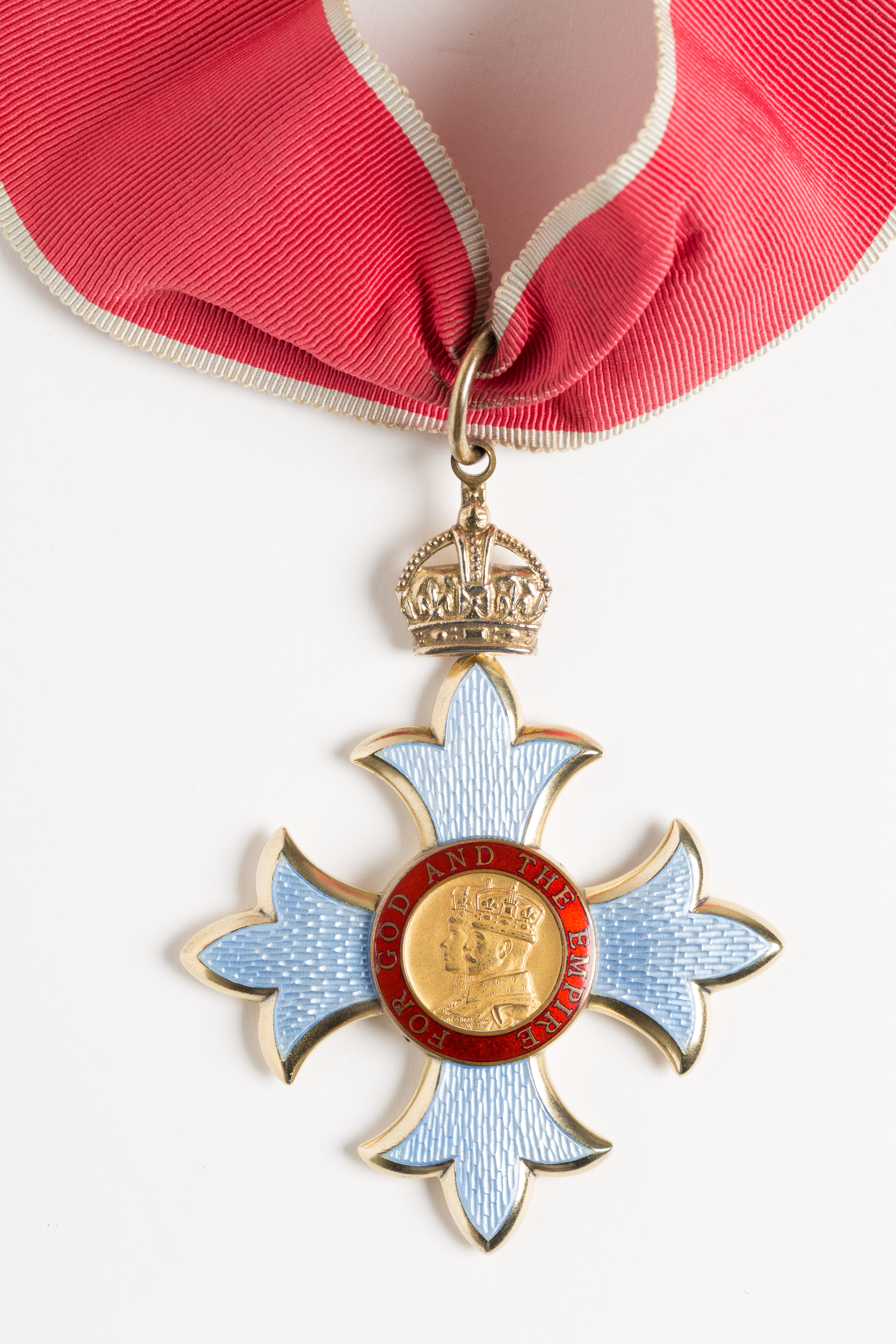
CBE insignia

Arthur Henry Alexander Dibbs CBE (9 December 1918 – 28 November 1985) was a British banker who served as CEO from 1972 until 1977 and then as deputy chairman of the NatWest Group until 1982.

Dibbs was nominated President of Marylebone Cricket Club (for 1983/84) by Sir Anthony Tuke.

== Background and early life ==
Of Scottish ancestry, he was born in 1918 at Bombay in British India, the only son of Captain Henry James Dibbs (1887–1959), late Indian Army and Phyllis née Baker, whose mother's family were cadets of the ancient Cottons from Derbyshire. His patrilineal great-great-granduncle, Captain John Dibbs, married in Australia and was father of Thomas Allwright Dibbs and George Dibbs.

Educated at Dover College then at the Whitgift School, Dibbs later pursued business studies at Harvard (AMP).

== Career ==
In 1935 Dibbs joined Westminster Bank, before transferring in 1939 to its Metropolitan Control department at Lothbury in the City of London, working there briefly until the outbreak of World War II. Commissioned into the Bedfordshire and Hertfordshire Regiment and seconded to the King's African Rifles, Dibbs served in the Middle East and Africa, being promoted captain.

Returning to Westminster Bank Metropolitan Control headquarters in 1946, between 1954 and 1960 Dibbs was secretary to bank chief general manager, Arthur Chesterfield. He then gained three years' experience as a bank branch manager in Croydon, Surrey. In April 1963, after graduating from the Advanced Management Programme at Harvard Business School, Dibbs was appointed assistant general manager in Northern Control, where he developed a reputation for getting to know his branch staff well and communicating with them personally. In 1966 he was promoted general manager of Metropolitan Control West.

In 1968 Westminster Bank announced plans to merge with National Provincial Bank and its subsidiary District Bank to form National Westminster Bank. Dibbs was appointed general manager of the new NatWest domestic banking division, and was responsible for completely reorganising the business following what was then the biggest merger in British banking history. In 1970, the year in which the merger took full effect, Dibbs was appointed deputy chief executive, and joined the board of directors. He became chief executive officer in May 1972 and served for five years before becoming deputy chairman in 1977, serving until his retirement in 1982.

Also joint deputy chairman of British Airways (1981–85), Dibbs chaired the finance committee of Marylebone Cricket Club, before serving as club president for 1983/84.

He was appointed a Commander of the Order of the British Empire (CBE) in the 1983 Birthday Honours.

== Personal life ==
In 1948, he married (Helen) Pearl Mathewson (died 1995), eldest daughter of James Wallace Mathewson.

A keen cricketer and golfer, Dibbs lived with his wife at Tadworth, Surrey, and had two daughters.

His memorial service was held on 20 January 1986 at the Guild Church of St Margaret, Lothbury led by the Rector, Chandos Morgan, with lessons read by Lord Boardman and P. B. H. May, and the eulogy given by Robin Leigh-Pemberton, Governor of the Bank of England.

== See also ==
- NatWest Trophy
