= List of Dorset County Cricket Club grounds =

Locations of grounds used by Dorset

The Dorset County Cricket Club was established in February 1896. Since then, it has played minor counties cricket since 1897 and played List A cricket from 1968 to 2004, using a different number of home grounds during that time. Their first minor counties fixture in 1897 was against Wiltshire at the Recreation Ground, Blandford Forum, while their first List A match came 71 years later against Bedfordshire in the 1968 Gillette Cup at Sherborne School. The club is based at Dean Park, Bournemouth, which also held first-class and List A cricket for Hampshire from 1897 to 1992.

The seventeen grounds that Dorset have used for home matches since 1897 are listed below, with statistics complete through to the end of the 2012 season.

== Grounds ==
=== List A ===
Below is a complete list of grounds used by Dorset County Cricket Club when it was permitted to play List A matches. These grounds have also held Minor Counties Championship and MCCA Knockout Trophy matches.

Name	Location	First	Last	Matches	First	Last	Matches	First	Last	Matches	Refs
Name	Location	List A			Minor Counties Championship			MCCA Trophy			Refs
Sherborne School	Sherborne	only match: 8 June 1992 v Bedfordshire		1	5 August 1902 v Devon	25 May 1997 v Herefordshire	69	3 June 1984 v Wiltshire	still in use	14	
Dean Park	Bournemouth	29 June 1983 v Essex	5 May 2004 v Yorkshire	8	13 August 1982 v Devon	still in use	60	2 June 1985 v Cornwall	still in use	22	(Note: Hampshire played first-class and List A cricket at Dean Park from 1897 to 1992. Only the List A matches played by Dorset at the ground are recorded in the table.)

=== Minor Counties ===
Below is a complete list of grounds used by the Dorset County Cricket Club in Minor Counties Championship and MCCA Knockout Trophy matches.

Name	Location	First	Last	Matches	First	Last	Matches	Refs
Name	Location	Minor Counties Championship			MCCA Trophy			Refs
Recreation Ground	Blandford Forum	16 August 1897 v Wiltshire	18 August 1981 v Wiltshire	38	–	–	0	
St Mary's Field	Bridport	21 July 1902 v Wiltshire	7 August 1939 v Cornwall	25	–	–	0	
Weymouth College Ground	Weymouth	23 August 1902 v Surrey Second XI	5 August 1935 v Cornwall	12	–	–	0	
Poole Park	Poole	15 July 1903 v Staffordshire	26 August 1981 v Oxfordshire	60	–	–	0	
Recreation Ground	Dorchester	1 July 1908 v Surrey Second XI	30 July 1996 v Cheshire	59	2 May 2010 v Bedfordshire	5 June 2011 v Hertfordshire	2	
Earl of Shaftesbury's Ground	Wimborne St Giles	18 August 1909 v Wiltshire	19 August 1914 v Wiltshire	5	–	–	0	
Merley Park	Wimborne	27 July 1934 v Oxfordshire	21 August 1939 v Wiltshire	7	–	–	0	
Canford School Ground	Canford Magna	16 August 1937 v Oxfordshire	12 June 1994 v Oxfordshire	14	–	–	0	
Redlands Sports Ground	Weymouth	15 August 1951 v Cornwall	11 June 2000 v Shropshire	59	24 July 1988 v Cambridgeshire	15 May 2011 v Herefordshire	4	
Royal Army Corps Ground	Bovington	only match: 8 June 1992 v Oxfordshire		1	–	–	0	
Terrace Ground	Sherborne	7 August 1957 v Wiltshire	22 August 1962 v Oxfordshire	7	–	–	0	
Hanhams Cricket Ground	Wimborne	30 August 1957 v Oxfordshire	24 July 1979 v Berkshire	11	–	–	0	
Cockram's Ground	Shaftesbury	19 August 1960 v Oxfordshire	13 August 1971 v Devon	4	–	–	0	
Bournemouth Sports Club	Bournemouth	1 August 1962 v Cornwall	10 September 2000 v Cumberland	9	–	–	0	
Day's Park	Swanage	22 August 1969 v Wiltshire	17 August 1970 v Oxfordshire	2	–	–	0	
