= MCC Coaching manual =

The MCC Coaching Manual is the popular name for The MCC Cricket Coaching Book, a manual of cricket skills produced by the Marylebone Cricket Club (MCC). The book outlined the traditional approaches to batting, bowling and fielding. It was first published in 1952, written by Harry Altham, and went through several editions before being superseded by MCC Masterclass: The New MCC Coaching Book in 1994. That book is now out of print, and has been replaced in the UK by a range of coaching resources from the ECB.

In modern cricket, the MCC coaching manual is usually cited idiomatically in reference to orthodox techniques: a well-executed classical batting stroke may be described as "straight out of the coaching manual", while unorthodox shots such as the reverse sweep are ones "you wouldn't find in the MCC coaching manual."

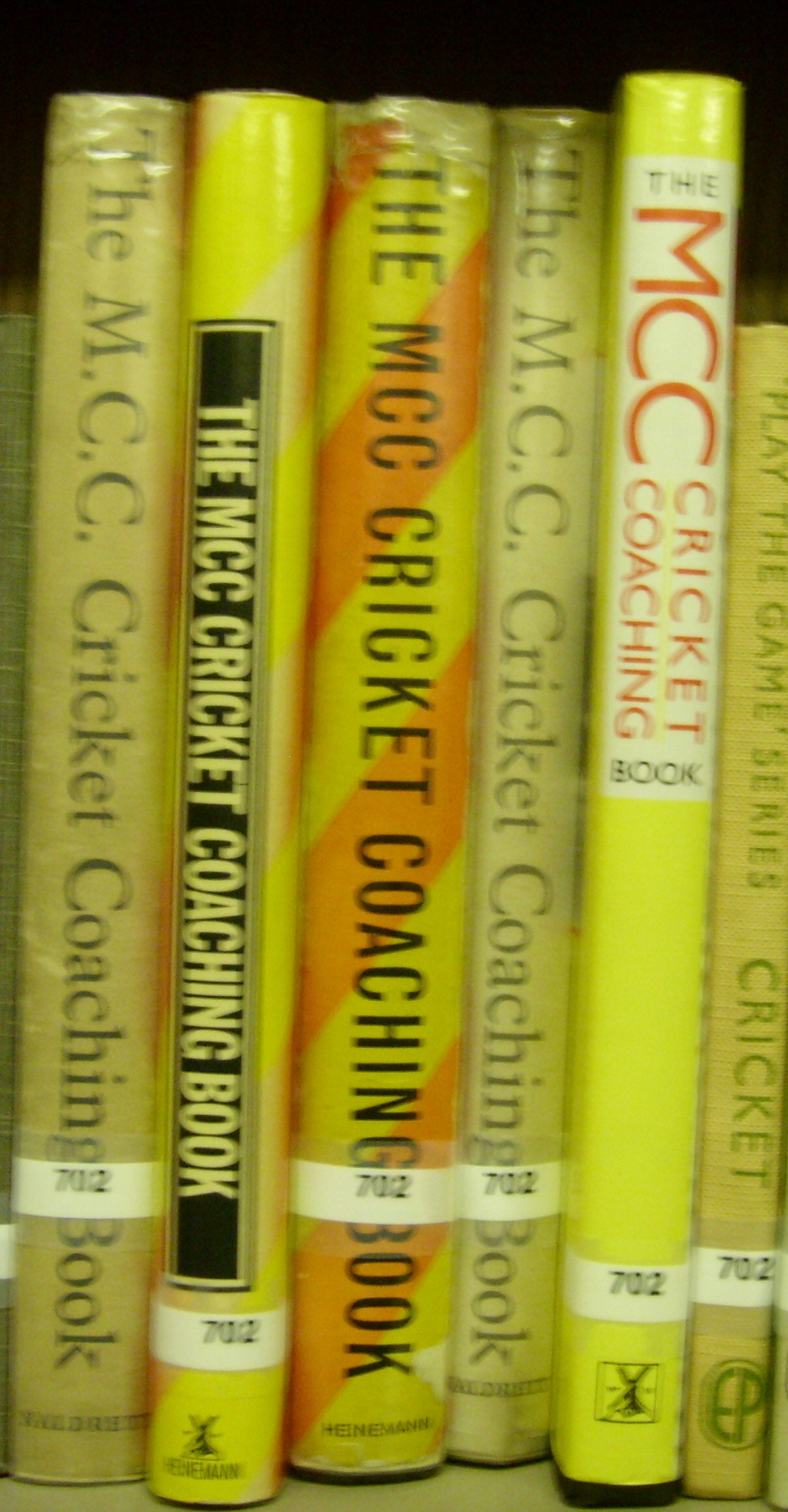
