= Harry Altham =

English cricketer and historian (1888–1965)

Harry Altham CBE DSO MC
Personal information
- Full name: Harry Surtees Altham
- Born: 30 November 1888; Camberley, Surrey, England
- Died: 11 March 1965 (aged 76); Fulwood, Yorkshire, England
- Batting: Right-handed
- Bowling: Right-arm medium
- Relatives: Richard Altham (son); Arthur Brodhurst (son-in-law)

Domestic team information
- Years: Team
- 1908–1912: Surrey
- 1909–1912: Oxford University
- 1913: Marylebone Cricket Club
- 1919–1923: Hampshire

Career statistics
Competition	First-class
Matches	55
Runs scored	1,537
Batting average	19.70
100s/50s	1/4
Top score	141
Balls bowled	72
Wickets	0
Bowling average	–
5 wickets in innings	–
10 wickets in match	–
Best bowling	–
Catches/stumpings	26/–
- Source: Cricinfo, 26 July 2020

Harry Surtees Altham CBE DSO MC (30 November 1888 – 11 March 1965) was an English first-class cricketer who became an important figure in the game as an administrator, historian and coach. He was born in Camberley in November 1888. Shortly after completing his education in 1908, Altham played first-class cricket for Surrey, prior to his matriculation to Trinity College, Oxford. There, he played first-class cricket for Oxford University Cricket Club from 1909 to 1912, gaining two blues.

After graduating from Oxford, he became a schoolmaster at Winchester College, where he would be employed for more than thirty years. Altham served with distinction in the First World War with the King's Royal Rifle Corps, being awarded the Military Cross and appointed a Companion of the Distinguished Service Order. Following the war, he played county cricket for Hampshire, and after retiring from playing he became a noted administrator and historian.

As a historian, he is best known for publishing four editions of A History of Cricket between 1926 and 1962. In an administrative capacity, he held the presidencies of both Hampshire and the Marylebone Cricket Club, in addition to being a Test selector for the England cricket team in 1954. Altham died from a heart attack two-hours after addressing a cricket society in Sheffield on 11 March 1965. Wisden posthumously described him as "among the best known personalities in the world of cricket".

== Early life ==
The son of the British Army officer Edward Altham Altham and his Scottish wife, Georgina Emily Nicol, Altham was born on 30 November 1888 in Yorktown in Camberley. He was educated at Repton School, where he captained the cricket eleven. A member of what was considered the best English school eleven of all time, Wisden described his schoolboy abilities as "more the made than the natural cricketer". A month after completing his final year at Repton, Altham made his debut in first-class cricket for Surrey, playing a single match against Leicestershire in the 1908 County Championship. From Repton, he matriculated to Trinity College, Oxford. The following season, he featured in a County Championship match for Surrey in May, before proceeding to make two first-class appearances for Oxford University Cricket Club in June, the same month that he also played against Oxford for Surrey. He made four first-class appearances for Oxford in 1910, and played once for Surrey against Oxford at The Oval, scoring a maiden half century (51 runs).

Altham made six first-class appearances for Oxford in 1911, gaining a blue by playing in The University Match against Cambridge at Lord's, having missed out playing in the match in the preceding two seasons. He played his final season for Oxford in 1912, making a further six first-class appearances and gaining a second blue by making consecutive appearances in The University Match. After completing his studies at Oxford and graduating with a second class degree in literae humaniores, Altham played six matches for Surrey in the latter half of the 1912 County Championship. In May 1913, he was appointed a master and cricket coach at Winchester College. He made just one first-class appearance in 1913, playing for the Marylebone Cricket Club (MCC) against Yorkshire in the season-ending Scarborough Festival. He did not play first-class cricket in 1914, a season that was curtailed due to the outbreak of the First World War.

== First World War service ==
Altham enlisted in the British Army in August 1914, being commissioned as a second lieutenant on probation in the 5th Battalion, King's Royal Rifle Corps. Serving on the Western Front, his probationary period finished in January 1915, with promotion to lieutenant following a fortnight later. He was seconded to the staff in March 1915, during which he was promoted to captain in May 1915. Altham was awarded the Military Cross in December 1916. He was made a temporary major in February 1918, before being appointed a Companion to the Distinguished Service Order in May 1918. He was mentioned in despatches on three occasions during the war. Following the cessation of hostilities in November 1918, Altham was made a temporary lieutenant colonel in January 1919, an appointment he relinquished the following month. He resigned his commission in January 1920, at which point he was granted the rank of major.

== Later playing career ==
Altham resumed playing first-class cricket in August 1919, when he played as an amateur for Hampshire against Middlesex in the 1919 County Championship; he had qualified to play for Hampshire having been resident at Winchester since taking up his appointment at Winchester College. Later in the season at Lord's, he played for a team of Demobilised Officers against a combined Army and Navy team. A two-year hiatus would follow, during which he played no first-class cricket. In May 1921, he became available to play for Hampshire in the 1921 County Championship, making nine appearances in the latter half of the season. Against Kent at Canterbury, he scored an "aggressive and faultless" century, making 141 runs, having been one of five Hampshire batsmen to have been dismissed without scoring in their first innings. His innings helped to save Hampshire from an innings defeat, and was later described by Gerry Weigall as "The finest innings ever played at Canterbury except Bradman's 205". His teaching commitments at Winchester restricted Altham to not appearing until August in the 1922 season, with him making eight appearances in the County Championship. He played a further season for Hampshire in 1923, making six appearances in the latter part of the County Championship, with his teaching commitments once again restricting his availability. Eight years later, Altham returned to first-class cricket when he played for the Gentlemen of England against the touring New Zealanders.

Altham made 55 appearances in first-class cricket, scoring 1,537 runs at an average of 19.70, with one century and four half centuries. In the field, he took 26 catches. For Hampshire, he made 24 appearances and scored 713 runs at an average of 22.28.

== Administration and coaching ==
Alongside coaching at Winchester College, Altham was a prominent figure in nationwide youth coaching. He was a founding member of the English Schools Cricket Association, serving as its president, and of the MCC Youth Cricket Association, serving as its first chairman. He was the co-author and editor of the MCC Cricket Coaching Book, published in 1952. Altham spent much time popularising the game amongst the youth, making efforts to ensure that cricket grounds were made available for boys to practice on, who might otherwise have had to practice on the streets. He would also coach youth cricket at the MCC coaching classes at Lilleshall Hall in Shropshire. He was appointed Chairman of a Special Committee to inquire into the future welfare of English cricket in 1949, saying, "If only we can get enough boys playing this game in England, and playing it right, it is quite certain that from the mass will be thrown up in some year or another a new Compton, a new Tate, a new Jack Hobbs, and, when that happens, we need not worry anymore about our meetings with Australia."

Altham served on the MCC Committee from 1941 until his death in 1965. He was its treasurer from 1950 until 1963 and president in 1959–60. He was a member of the Hampshire Committee for more than forty years and was elected the president of the club in 1946, succeeding J. G. Greig; he remained president until his death. Hubert Doggart would credit, in-part, Hampshire's maiden County Championship title in 1961 to his inspiration as president. Altham was also Chairman of the English Test selectors in 1954, and was a strong supporter of Len Hutton's captaincy.

== Historian ==
Altham began his authoritative writing on cricket around the same time that he began playing County Championship cricket for Hampshire. His celebrated A History of Cricket began as a serial in The Cricketer magazine and first appeared in book-form in 1926, which John Arlott would later opine was "remarkable for its scope, perception and mature style". Revised editions appeared in 1938, this time in collaboration with E. W. Swanton, and then in 1947 and 1948 with Swanton, and in 1948 including an introduction by Plum Warner. Swanton himself clarified the nature of Altham's contribution to A History of Cricket. "In the obituary written in the factual, anonymous vein generally adopted by Wisden," he wrote, "I notice for the first time what can only be described as a howler. The second paragraph of the piece begins: 'Altham collaborated with E. W. Swanton in a book, The History of Cricket...' ... The first edition of A History of Cricket (note the indefinite article) was written by Harry when I was a boy. It was twelve years later, in 1938, that he honoured me by asking me to collaborate with him, in a Second Edition. This I did, and so continued with three subsequent editions, as the junior and subservient partner, until the last appeared in two volumes some three years before his death." Altham credited Swanton's contributions in the book's fourth edition in 1948, writing: "This not-inconsiderable labour I could not have undertaken by myself, but I was fortunate enough to secure the collaboration of Mr. E. W. Swanton whose broad shoulders readily sustained by far the greater part of the burden". Writing in 1956, A. A. Thomson said of the History of Cricket that it was "a massive record of the game from first beginnings out to the undiscovered ends, written with authority and affection, accuracy and charm".

Altham was also, alongside Arlott, the joint-author of Hampshire County Cricket: The Official History of Hampshire County Cricket Club in 1957, in addition to being a regular contributor to Wisden and The Cricketer, while also writing for The Observer newspaper. Following his death, a collection of Altham's writing, edited and revised by Hubert Doggart, was published, namely The Heart of Cricket: A Memoir of H. S. Altham in 1967. Besides his writing on cricket, Altham was also considered an authority on the history of Winchester Cathedral. He was editor of the Winchester Cathedral Record from 1947 until his death in 1965, contributing a number of articles.

=== Selected works ===
- Altham, Harry; Arlott, John (1957). Hampshire County Cricket: The Official History of Hampshire County Cricket Club. London: Phoenix House. OCLC 958737412.
- A History of Cricket (1 ed.). London: George Allen & Unwin. 1926. OCLC 1221577585.
- Altham, Harry; Swanton, E. W. (1938). A History of Cricket (2 ed.). London: George Allen & Unwin. OCLC 557645553.
- Altham, Harry; Swanton, E. W. (1947). A History of Cricket (3 ed.). London: George Allen & Unwin. OCLC 6168369.
- Warner, Sir Pelham (1948). Introduction. A History of Cricket. By Altham, Harry; Swanton, E. W. (4 ed.). London: George Allen & Unwin. OCLC 1244779964.
- Altham, Harry; Swanton, E. W. (1962). A History of Cricket. Vol. 1–2 (5 ed.). London: George Allen & Unwin. OCLC 894274808.
- Altham, Harry; Arlott, John (1967). The Pictorial History of Lord's and the MCC. London: Pitkins Pictorials. OCLC 255758048.

== Personal life and death ==
Altham was a schoolmaster and a cricket coach at Winchester College for more than thirty years, retiring from the post in 1947. From 1927, he was also the housemaster of Chernocke House until his retirement. During his time at Winchester, he became an enthusiast for and patron of the sport of rackets. After retirement, he remained in Winchester, where he still lent assistance to the college as a "careers master". He was made a Commander of the Order of the British Empire (CBE) in the 1957 Birthday Honours. He was a renowned after-dinner speaker, being invited to speak at both the centenary dinners for Hampshire and Yorkshire.

Altham died approximately two hours after a speaking engagement to a cricket society in Sheffield on 11 March 1965, having suffered a heart attack. He was survived by his wife Winifred, whom he had married in 1917, with the couple having a son and two daughters; their son, Richard, also played first-class cricket. Altham was buried at the Morn Hill Cemetery in Winchester. Wisden posthumously described him as "among the best known personalities in the world of cricket". According to Swanton in his obituary for The Daily Telegraph: "He was a man of deep and abiding loyalties, with a wonderful facility, which his wife shared, of inspiring the friendship and affection of the young." He went on to ask: "Have MCC ever had so 'compleat' a cricketer in their seat of honour?"

== Works cited ==
- Warner, Pelham (1948). Introduction. A History of Cricket. By Altham, Harry; Swanton, E. W. (4 ed.). London: George Allen & Unwin. OCLC 1244779964.
- Broom, John (2022). Cricket in the First World War. Barnsley: Pen and Sword History. ISBN 978-1-5267-8014-0.
- Martin-Jenkins (1996). World Cricketers: A Biographical Dictionary. Oxford University Press. ISBN 978-0-1921-0005-4 – via Internet Archive.
- Swanton, E. W. (1968). Cricket from all Angles. London: Michael Joseph. ISBN 978-0-7181-0617-1. (pieces originally published in The Daily Telegraph)
- Swanton, E. W. (1978). Follow On. London: Fontana. ISBN 978-0-0063-5329-4.
- Swanton, E. W. (1980). Barclay's World of Cricket (2 ed.). London: Collins Publishers. ISBN 978-0-0021-6349-1 – via Internet Archive.
- Thomson, A. A. (1991). Pavilioned in Splendour. London: Pavilion Books. ISBN 978-1-8514-5658-1.
- Whitehead, Richard (2025). Victory in Australia. London: Bloomsbury Publishing. ISBN 978-1-3994-1504-0.
