= Richard Altham =

English cricketer

Personal information
- Full name: Richard James Livingstone Altham
- Born: 19 January 1924; Winchester, Hampshire, England
- Died: 17 August 2005 (aged 81); England
- Batting: Right handed
- Bowling: Right-arm medium

Domestic team information
- Years: Team
- 1947: Oxford University

Career statistics
Competition	FC
Matches	2
Runs scored	14
Batting average	4.66
100s/50s	0/0
Top score	14
Catches/stumpings	2/–
- Source: CricketArchive, 9 August 2008

Richard James Livingstone Altham MBE (19 January 1924 – 17 August 2005) was an English first-class cricketer who played for Oxford University Cricket Club and the Free Foresters. His highest score of 14 came when playing for Oxford University in the match against Free Foresters. He also played for Hertfordshire in the Minor Counties Championship. He was educated at Marlborough College and Trinity College, Oxford.

He was appointed MBE in the 2000 New Year Honours for services to young people and to Book Aid.

His father was Harry Altham CBE, the cricket historian, coach and schoolmaster of Winchester College.
