= William Webster (cricketer, born 1910) =

English athlete, stockbroker, and administrator (1910–1986)

William Hugh Webster
- Born: 22 February 1910; Hackney, London, England
- Died: 19 June 1986 (aged 76)
- Education: Cambridge University
Association football career
College career
Years	Team	Apps	(Gls)
- Cambridge University
- Cricket career

Cricket information
- Batting: Right-handed

Domestic team information
- Years: Team
- Cambridge University
- Middlesex County Cricket Club

William Hugh Webster CBE (22 February 1910 – 19 June 1986) was an English cricketer, footballer, stockbroker and administrator.

== Biography ==
He was born in Hackney and educated at Highgate School and Cambridge University. He lived in Hampstead and St John's Wood and worked in the City.

As a cricketer, his opportunities were limited by the demands of his business and also by the conflict on his spare time of football, both taking up so much of his annual leave (which was so brief pre-war).

He won seven Amateur International football caps and as well as gaining blues at Cambridge for both cricket and football, played 46 first-class matches for Middlesex as a right-handed batsman between 1932 and 1947.

Beyond these sporting skills, it is as an administrator that he will probably be best remembered. He was elected to the Middlesex General Committee in 1954, he was Chairman of the Cricket Committee (1965–1970), Treasurer (1962–1975) and President (1980–1982). He was equally active in his service to Marylebone Cricket Club (MCC). He served on its committee (1960–1978) and also chaired the Ground and Fixtures Committee (1962–1976). He was President of the MCC (1977–1978). He attended every day of the court hearing into the "Packer Case".

He served the Football Association from 1950 to 1986 and chaired the Finance Committee (1974–1986).

As a stockbroker, he advocated a long-term strategy and whether guarding Middlesex's meagre resources or the Football Association's more ample funds, they were always safe under his guidance.
