= 1935 County Championship =

English cricket tournament

- Cricket format: First-class cricket
- Tournament format: League system
- Champions: Yorkshire (18th title)

The 1935 County Championship was the 42nd officially organised running of the County Championship. Yorkshire County Cricket Club won the championship title.

== Table ==
- A minimum of 24 matches
- 15 points for a win
- 7.5 points to each team in a match where the scores finish level
- 5 points for first-innings lead in a drawn match
- 3 points for first-innings deficit in a drawn match
- 4 points to each team where the first-innings scores are level in a drawn match or where there is no result on first innings or where there is no play.
- Positions decided by a percentage of points won against possible points available
- Matches with the first two days washed out would then be played as one day matches and decided on first innings, with 10 points for the winner and 3 points for the loser.

County Championship table
Team	Pld	W	L	DWF	DLF	NR	Pts	%PC
Yorkshire	30	19	1	3	7	0	321	71.33
Derbyshire	28	16	6	4	2	0	266	63.33
Middlesex	24	11	5	6	1	1	202	56.11
Lancashire	28	12	6	8	1	1	227	54.04
Nottinghamshire	28	10	3	8	5	2	213	50.71
Leicestershire	24	11	9	2	2	0	181	50.27
Sussex	32	13	10	3	2	4*	232	48.33
Warwickshire	24	9	6	3	6	0	168	46.66
Essex	28	11	12	3	2	0	186	44.28
Kent	30	10	12	5	2	1	185	41.11
Surrey	26	7	5	5	7	2	159	40.76
Worcestershire	30	9	16	0	4	1	151	33.55
Glamorgan	26	6	11	5	2	2	129	33.07
Somerset	26	5	11	4	6	0	113	28.97
Gloucestershire	30	6	16	2	6	0	118	26.22
Hampshire	30	5	16	1	8	0	104	23.11
Northamptonshire	24	1	16	3	2	2*	44	12.22

- includes match tied on first innings
