= Dean Park Cricket Ground =

Cricket ground in Bournemouth, England

Coordinates: 50°43′38″N 1°52′17″W

Dean Park
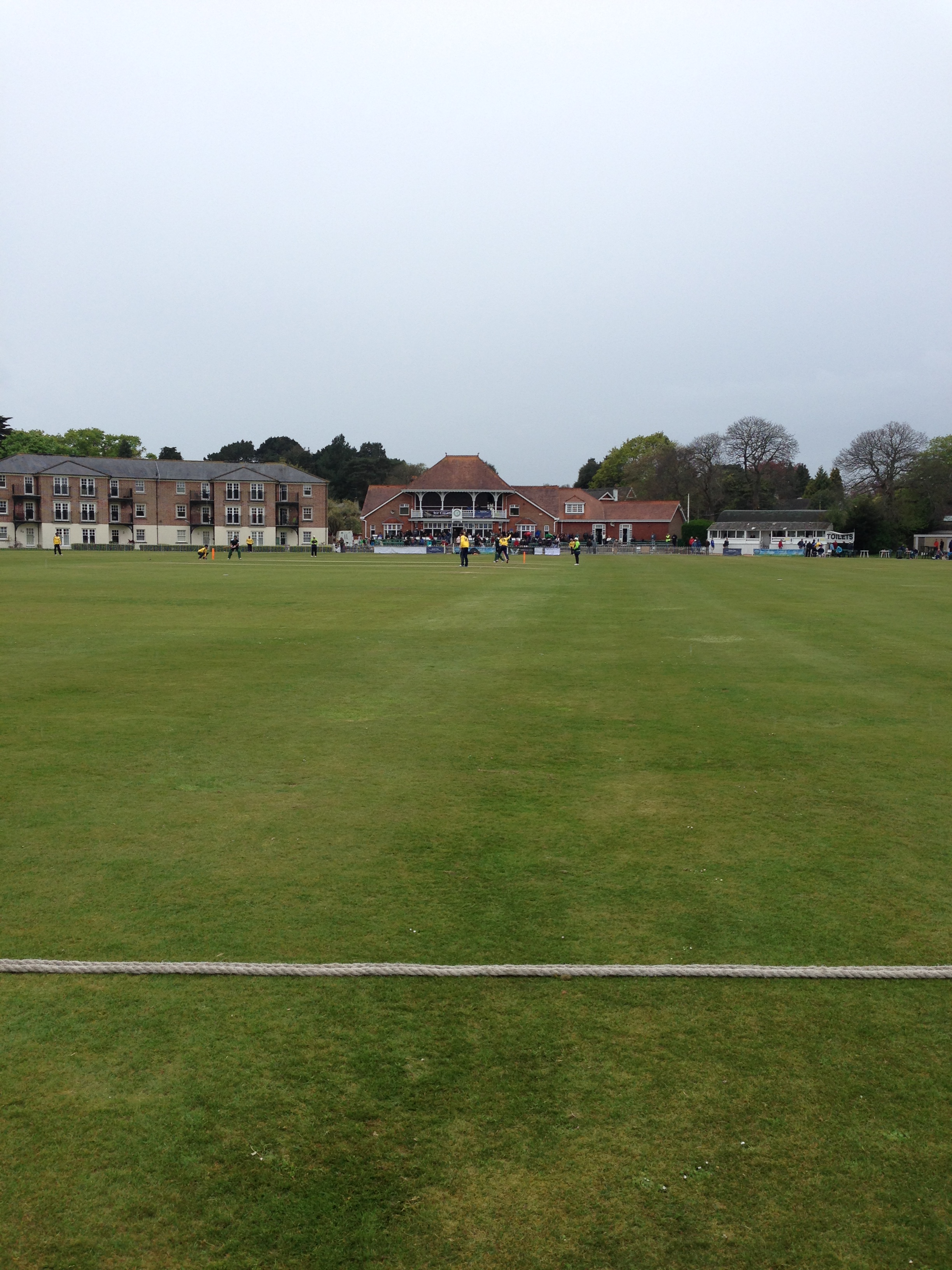
- Interactive map of Dean Park

Ground information
- Location: Bournemouth, Dorset
- Country: England
- Establishment: 1871
- Capacity: 6,000
- End names
- Town End; Winton End

Team information
Dorset	(1982–2015)
Hampshire	(1897–1992)
- As of 6 September 2020; Source: CricketArchive

Dean Park is a cricket ground in Bournemouth, England. It was formerly used by Hampshire and Dorset County Cricket Clubs. It was bought by Park School in 2014.

== History ==
The first match played at Dean Park was between Bournemouth Cricket Club and a team of artillery officers in June 1871.

Dean Park has hosted 343 first-class matches since 1897, but none since 1992. There have also been 77 List A games at the ground, the most recent being in 2010. One women's One-day International, between Young England and Australia, was staged at Dean Park as part of the inaugural Women's Cricket World Cup in 1973.

on Tuesday 26 November 1878 Bournemouth F.C. participated in one of the first floodlit matches, when they played under experimental electric lights at Dean Park for "a grand exhibition of the new electric light". In 1888 the club moved to Dean Park and changed their name to Bournemouth Dean Park.

Following changes to county borders that transferred Bournemouth from Hampshire to Dorset, Dorset County Cricket Club began using the ground in the 1980s, although Hampshire also continued to use the ground until 1992. From 1994 to 2015 it was the main ground for Dorset. The ground was also used by Bournemouth University, who took on the lease of the ground in 1995.

The ground was sold to Park School in 2014 who currently use it for sport days and a nursery.

== Records ==
=== First-class ===
- Highest team total: 610 by Kent v Hampshire, 1906
- Lowest team total: 31 by Hampshire v Worcestershire, 1965
- Highest individual innings: 316 by Dick Moore for Hampshire v Warwickshire, 1937
- Best bowling in an innings: 9–39 by Hugh Trumble for Australians v South of England, 1902
- Best bowling in a match: 15–68 by Hugh Trumble, as above

=== List A ===
- Highest team total: 333/4 (50 overs) by Glamorgan v Dorset, 2000
- Lowest team total: 71 (33.2 overs) by Norfolk v Dorset, 2000
- Highest individual innings: 156 by Matthew Elliott for Glamorgan v Dorset, 2000
- Best bowling in an innings: 5–10 by Vyvian Pike for Dorset v Norfolk, 2000
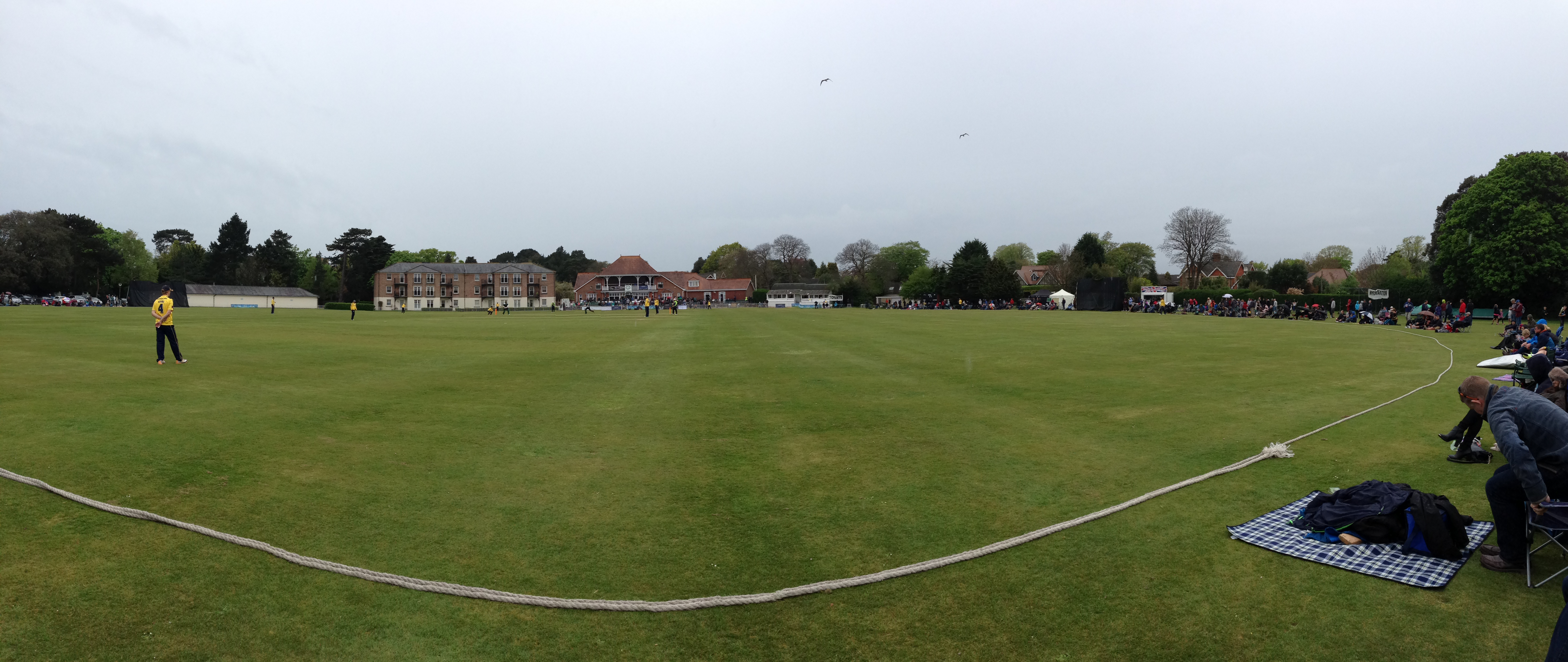
A panorama of Dean Park during a 20-over friendly match between Dorset and Hampshire in 2015

== See also ==
- List of Hampshire County Cricket Club grounds
- List of Dorset County Cricket Club grounds
