= Marylebone Cricket Club =

Cricket club and former governing body of cricket

Coordinates: 51°31′46.46″N 0°10′22.75″W

Team information
- City: St John's Wood, London, England
- Founded: 1787; 239 years ago
- Home ground: Lord's Cricket Ground
- Official website: lords.org/mcc

The Marylebone Cricket Club (MCC) is an English cricket club founded in 1787, whose Lord's headquarters are dubbed "the Home of Cricket".

Lord's Cricket Ground has been owned since Victorian times by MCC, which served as cricket's governing body from 1788 to 1909 and retains considerable global influence. Thomas Lord first established a cricket ground at Dorset Fields in Marylebone. Lord's Cricket Ground relocated in 1814 to nearby St John's Wood, historically in Middlesex and now in the City of Westminster, London NW8.

In 1788, the MCC assumed oversight for the Laws of Cricket, issuing a revised version that year. Changes to these Laws are nowadays determined by the International Cricket Council (ICC), with copyright retained by MCC. Established in 1909, the ICC was administered for eighty years by the Secretary to Marylebone Cricket Club and chaired by the MCC President ex officio.

MCC was given responsibility for organising England Test cricket overseas tours commencing with the 1903–04 tour of Australia and ending with its 1976–77 tour of India, both being victorious. England also played non-international matches overseas under the auspices of MCC.

In 1993, MCC transferred global cricket governance to the ICC, devolving domestic administration to the Test and County Cricket Board (TCCB).

Retaining first-class status when MCC plays first-class opposition, the club continues to promote the game by fielding ad hoc MCC XIs from a pool of circa 2,000 playing members, varying standards accordingly.

The outgoing MCC president, the Lord King of Lothbury KG, nominated Ed Smith as his successor for 2026.

== History and role ==
The origin of MCC was as a gentlemen's club that had flourished through most of the 18th century, including, at least in part, an existence as the original London Cricket Club, which played at the HAC cricket ground in the mid-1700s. Many of its members left for the Hambledon Club during the 1770s and then, in the early 1780s, returned to London's environs when the White Conduit Club began playing cricket in Islington. It is not known for certain when the White Conduit was established but it seems to have been after 1780 and certainly by 1785. According to Sir Pelham Warner, it was formed before 1782 as an offshoot from a West End convivial club called the Je-ne-sais-Quoi, some of whose members frequented the White Conduit House in Islington and played matches on the neighbouring White Conduit Fields, a prominent venue for cricket in the 1720s.

Arthur Haygarth states in Scores and Biographies that "the Marylebone Club was founded in 1787 from White Conduit members" but the date when it was established "could not be found". This gentlemen's club convened for multi-purpose social meetings at the Star & Garter Inn on Pall Mall. Having undertaken to draft the Laws of Cricket at various times, most notably in 1744 and 1774, the White Conduit soon vested such law-making with the MCC as the final repose of cricketing gentlemen. At the White Conduit Club's outset, its leading lights were George Finch, 9th Earl of Winchilsea and Nottingham (1752–1826) and Colonel the Hon. Charles Lennox (1764–1819), who later became the 4th Duke of Richmond. The White Conduit was nominally an exclusive club that only "gentlemen" could play for, but the club did engage professionals and one of these was Thomas Lord, recognised for his business acumen (being a successful wine merchant) "as well as his bowling ability".

The New Club may have continued there, save that White Conduit Fields was an open area where the public, including rowdier types, could watch cricket matches and voice their opinions on the play and players. The White Conduit members were not amused by such interruptions and decided to seek their own enclosed venue. Lord Winchilsea and Colonel Lennox asked Lord to find a new ground offering him a guarantee against any losses he may suffer in the venture. Lord took a lease from the Portman Estate on Dorset Fields where Dorset Square is now sited; and prepared the ground opening in 1787. Initially called the "New Cricket Ground", being nearby "the New Road" in Marylebone when the first-known match was played there on 21 May, by the end of July 1787, it was known as Lord's. As it was in Marylebone, the White Conduit members who relocated there soon decided to rename themselves the "Mary-le-bone Club". The exact date of MCC's foundation is lost but seems to have been sometime in the late spring or the summer of 1787. On 10 & 11 July 1837, a South v North match was staged at Lord's to commemorate the MCC Golden Jubilee. Warner described it as "a Grand Match to celebrate the Jubilee of the Club" and reproduced the full scorecard.

On 25 April 1787, London's Morning Herald newspaper carried a notice: "The Members of the Cricket Club are desired to meet at the Star & Garter, Pall Mall, on Mon., April 30. Dinner on table exactly at half past five o'clock. N.B. The favour of an answer is desired". Its agenda unspecified, only three weeks later on Saturday, 19 May, the Morning Herald advertised: "A grand match will be played on Monday, 21 May in the New Cricket Ground, the New Road, Mary-le-bone, between eleven Noblemen of the White Conduit Club and eleven Gentlemen of the County of Middlesex with two men given, for 500 guineas a side. The wickets to be pitched at ten o'clock, and the match to be played out". No post-match report has yet been found but, as G. B. Buckley states, it was "apparently the first match to be played on Lord's new ground".

A total of eight matches are known to have been played at Lord's in 1787, one of them a single-wicket event. The only one featuring the Mary-le-bone Club took place on Monday, 30 July. It was advertised in The World on Friday, 27 July 1787: "On Monday, 30 July will be played (at Lord's) a match between 11 gentlemen of the Mary-le-bone Club and 11 gentlemen of the Islington Club". "This is the earliest notice of the Marylebone Club" according to Buckley and as with Lord's inaugural fixture, no post-match report of MCC's inaugural game survives.

== Grounds ==
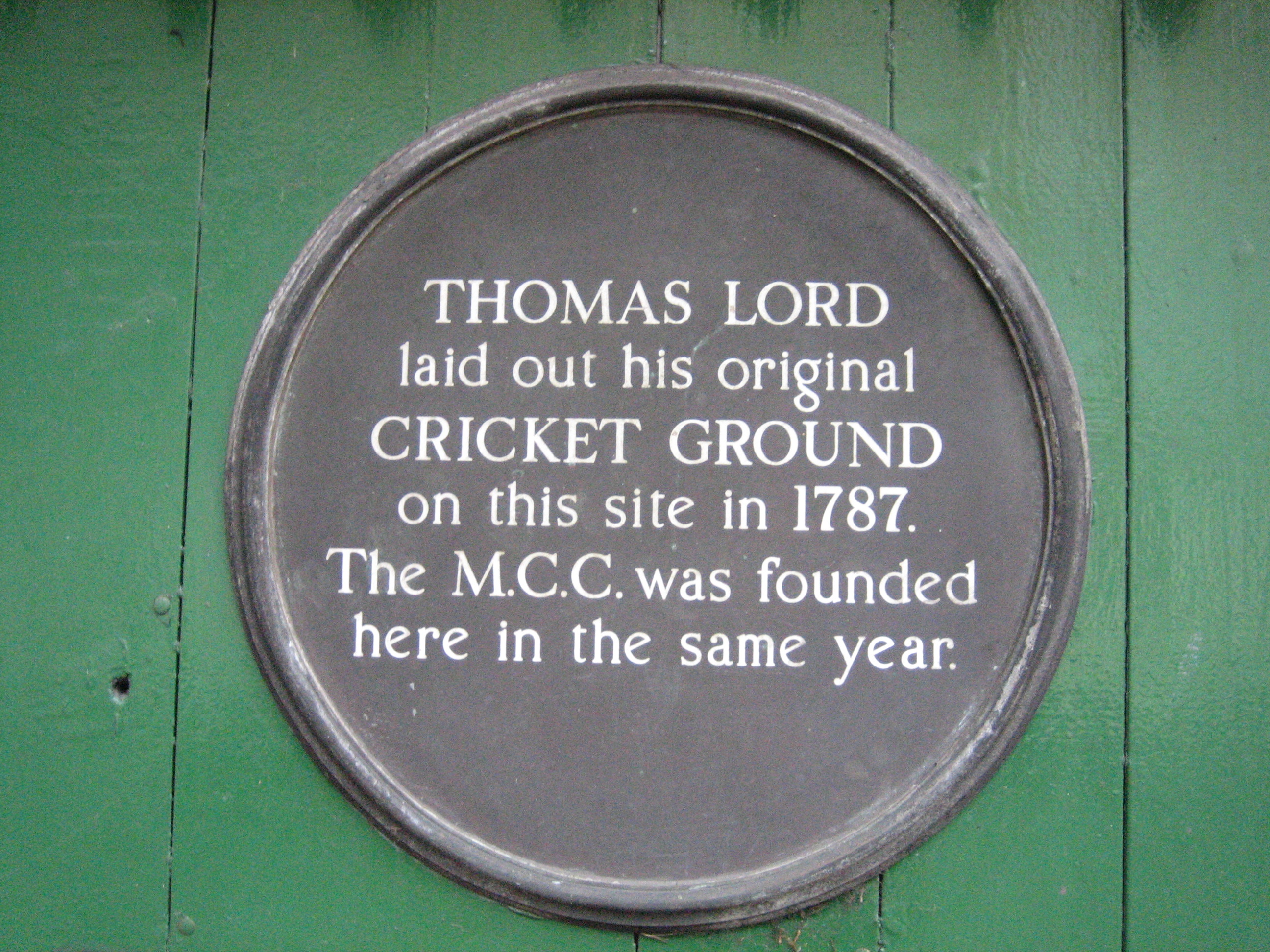
A plaque in Dorset Square, marking the site of the original Lord's Ground, commemorates MCC's foundation in 1787

There have been three Lord's cricket grounds: the original on the Portman Estate and two on the Eyre Estate. All three sites lie to the west of Regent's Park in London. Thomas Lord leased the original ground, now referred to as Lord's Old Ground, from the Portman Estate in 1787 and MCC played there until 1810 when Lord, after objecting to a rent increase, decided on terminating the lease to lift his turf and move out. Over 200 matches were known to be played there, mostly involving MCC and/or Middlesex XIs. Lord's Old Ground was on the site now occupied by Dorset Square, just east of Marylebone Station and west of Baker Street. To commemorate MCC's association, a plaque was unveiled at Dorset Square on 9 May 2006 by Sir Andrew Strauss.

With advance knowledge of the Portman Estate's intention to lease its land for building houses commanding much higher rents of over £600 per annum, on 15 October 1808, Lord secured two fields on the North Bank area of the St John's Wood Estate, which belonged to Walpole Eyre (1773–1856), a local landowner after whom Eyre's Tunnel on the Regent's Canal was named. Lord negotiated with the Eyres a rent of only £54 per annum for a term of eighty years, free of both land taxes and tithes.

The new ground on the Eyre Estate was available from 1809 and so Lord had two cricket fields at his disposal for the 1809 and 1810 seasons. This North Bank ground was sub-let to St John's Wood Cricket Club which eventually merged with MCC. Lord formally took over management of this second ground on 8 May 1811 there relaying his turf from the Old Ground. He did this so that "the noblemen and gentlemen of the MCC should be able to play on the same footing as before". According to Warner, Lord's relocation proved unpopular among many MCC members with the upshot that the club played no matches there throughout 1811 and 1812. Whilst its situation may have not been ideal, cricket generally was in decline at the time because of the Napoleonic Wars; the Association of Cricket Statisticians and Historians (the ACS) asserts that "(from) 1810 to 1814 the game was all but dead", largely because of the War and "the very real threat of civil unrest in England". This second venue is generally known as Lord's Middle Ground. In the three years that Lord leased it, only six matches were known to have taken place, with just three (all in 1813) involving the MCC. Although the exact location of Lord's Middle Ground remains uncertain, it is understood to have been at North Bank to the north end of Lisson Grove where the Regent's Canal cut through. Thus situated partially on the canal's route somewhere in the area now bounded by Lisson Grove (the B507) to south-west, Lodge Road to north-west, Park Road (the A41) to north-east and the Regent's Canal to south-east, this cricket field was no further than 300 yards (270 m) from the present Lord's Cricket Ground.

Lord was forced to abandon plans for his Middle Ground after Parliament decreed the new canal's route in 1813. Lord, via his protégé Lord Frederick Beauclerk, approached the Eyre family who agreed to lease another plot nearby in St John's Wood, but at an increased rent of £100 per annum. Accepting the Eyres' new terms, Lord again relocated his turf which was re-laid in time for the start of the 1814 season. This third ground remains Lord's present home to MCC for over 200 years.

=== Alternative grounds ===
From 1996 to 2008, the MCC played nine first-class and three List A matches against touring teams at cricket grounds other than Lord's:

- Denis Compton Oval, Shenley, Hertfordshire: (1996–1999)
  - 1996 vs South Africa A (first-class)
  - 1996 vs Pakistan (list A)
  - 1997 vs Pakistan A (first-class)
  - 1999 vs Sri Lanka (first-class)
- University Parks, Oxford, Oxfordshire: (2000)
  - 2000 vs New Zealand A (first-class)
- Savile Park, Castleford, Yorkshire: (2000)
  - 2000 vs Zimbabwe (list A)
- Arundel Castle Cricket Ground, Sussex: (2001–2007)
  - 2001 vs Australia (first-class)
  - 2004 vs West Indies (first-class)
  - 2007 vs Sri Lanka A (first-class)
- Queen's Park, Chesterfield, Derbyshire: (2002)
  - 2002 vs Sri Lanka (first-class)
- The Racecourse, Durham: (2007–2008)
  - 2007 vs West Indies (first-class)
  - 2008 vs Bangladesh A (list A)

== Laws of Cricket ==
MCC maintains responsibility for, and remains copyright holder of, the Laws of Cricket. Its Laws Sub-Committee is responsible for debating and drafting changes to the Laws, with the Main Committee then voting on any proposed amendments.

== Membership ==
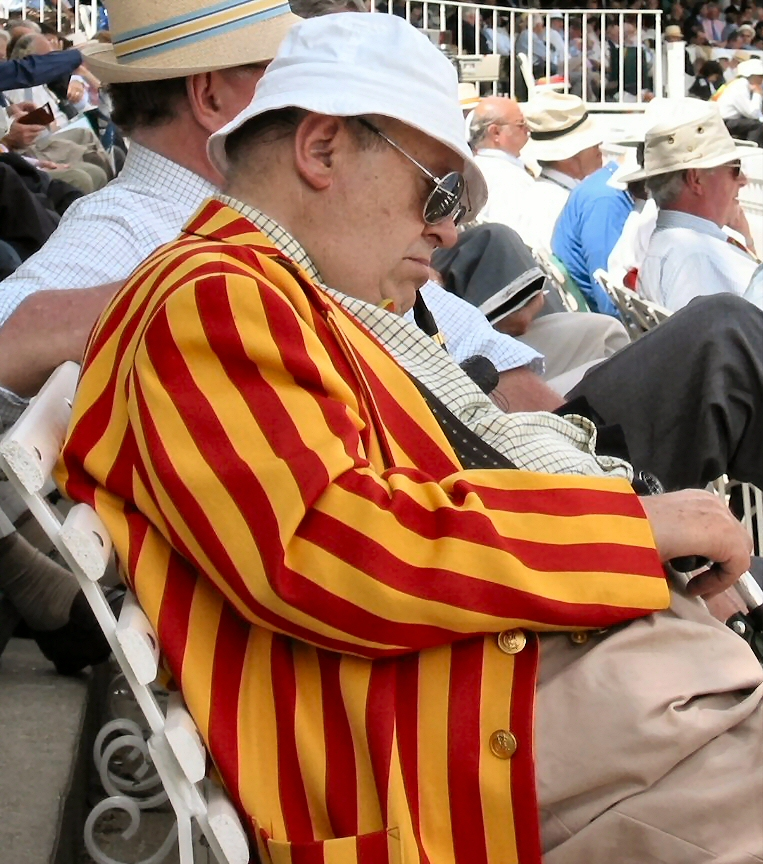
MCC member sporting the club's distinctive blazer

MCC has 18,000 full members and 5,000 associate members. Full Members enjoy voting rights and have access to the Pavilion and other stands at Lord's Cricket Ground for all matches played there; Associate Members' privileges are more restricted and vary on a case-by-case basis, but in broad terms they can attend most matches except major internationals.

MCC members did not allow female membership until 1998, with previous club ballots on change failing to achieve the requisite two-thirds majority for implementation. The move to change was spearheaded by Rachael Heyhoe Flint who applied as "R Flint" to slip under the radar into the male-only application system. When Colin Ingleby-Mackenzie, a longstanding advocate for women's membership, assumed the MCC Presidency in 1996 he led a two-year campaign to convince the membership to vote in favour of change. In September 1998 a 70% majority of members voted to allow female membership, so ending 212 years of male exclusivity, and 10 honorary life members were immediately admitted, including Baroness Heyhoe Flint. Until this time, the Queen, as club patron, was the only woman (other than domestic staff) permitted to enter the Pavilion during play. In February 1999, the first women, a group of five, were invited to join as playing members.

To join the candidates' waiting list for MCC membership one must be proposed by a full member (who can make one nomination per year) who details the prospective candidate's cricketing ability/experience/knowledge etc, corroborated with the nominee's own statement accordingly. If MCC deems the nomination form satisfactory, prospective candidates are invited to attend an interview at Lord's with two MCC Committee Members (comprising all MCC Sub-Committees; MCC Committee; MCC Out-Match Representatives; and MCC's Current, Past and Designate-President). As demand for membership always outstrips supply each year, there continues to be a substantial waiting list for Full Ordinary Membership, currently around 27 years. There are, however, ways to hasten the time it takes to become a full member: one may qualify as a Playing Member, or Out-Match Member (although this carries none of the privileges of membership, apart from being able to play for the club).

In addition, membership rules allow a certain number of people each year to be elected ahead of their turn; beneficiaries have included Sir Mick Jagger and in 2018 then-Prime Minister, Theresa May. MCC also awards limited honorary membership to people who have distinguished themselves in cricket. The club recognises achievement in women's cricket with, for example, Charlotte Edwards an inductee in 2012.

== Controversies ==
In 2005, the MCC was criticised (including by a few of its own members) for siding with the England and Wales Cricket Board (ECB) over the latter's decision to award television rights for Test cricket to British Sky Broadcasting, thus removing Test cricket from terrestrial television. The then-Secretary and Chief Executive of MCC, Roger Knight, represented the club on the board of the ECB and was party to this decision, prior to which Test cricket had been shown free to viewers on British television for over half a century.

MCC has the option of allowing members and other spectators to continue to bring a limited amount of alcoholic drinks into the ground at all matches. The ICC, was attempting to implement a ban on this practice at all international matches around the world. MCC opted to write to the ICC on an annual basis to seek permission for members and spectators to import alcohol into Lord's.

The Secretary & Chief Executive of the club has a seat on the administrative board of the ECB and it is believed that Keith Bradshaw (Secretary & Chief Executive 2006–11) may have influenced the removal from office of England Coach Duncan Fletcher in April 2007.

In 2012, MCC made headlines over a redevelopment plan, Vision for Lord's, that would have increased capacity but included construction of residential flats on some of the MCC site. Internal strife over the process of making a decision on the proposal led to the resignation of former Prime Minister Sir John Major from MCC's Main Committee.

In 2022, Guy Lavender, Secretary & Chief Executive of MCC, announced that the annual one-day Oxford v Cambridge and Eton v Harrow matches, both of which have been played at Lord's since the early 19th century, would no longer be held at the ground, so as to make room in the fixture list for the finals of competitions for all universities and schools in pursuit of greater diversity. Following opposition from a majority of its membership, the club decided that the matches would continue to be held at Lord's until 2023 to allow time for further consultation. In March 2023 it was announced that the fixtures would continue to be played at Lord's until at least 2027, following which there would be a review and a possible vote in 2028 on whether these historic matches should remain at Lord's.

During the Second Test of the 2023 Ashes series at Lord's, the MCC apologised to Cricket Australia and suspended three members for confronting Australian players walking through the Long Room. Video emerged of MCC members shouting abuse at Australian players after Jonny Bairstow was stumped in controversial circumstances, despite his dismissal being fair and legal.

== Matches ==
MCC men's and women's teams play domestic matches throughout the spring and summer against teams from universities, schools, the Armed Forces and invitational teams such as the Duchess of Rutland's XI. The men's team tour internationally four times per year, and the women's team tour every other year.

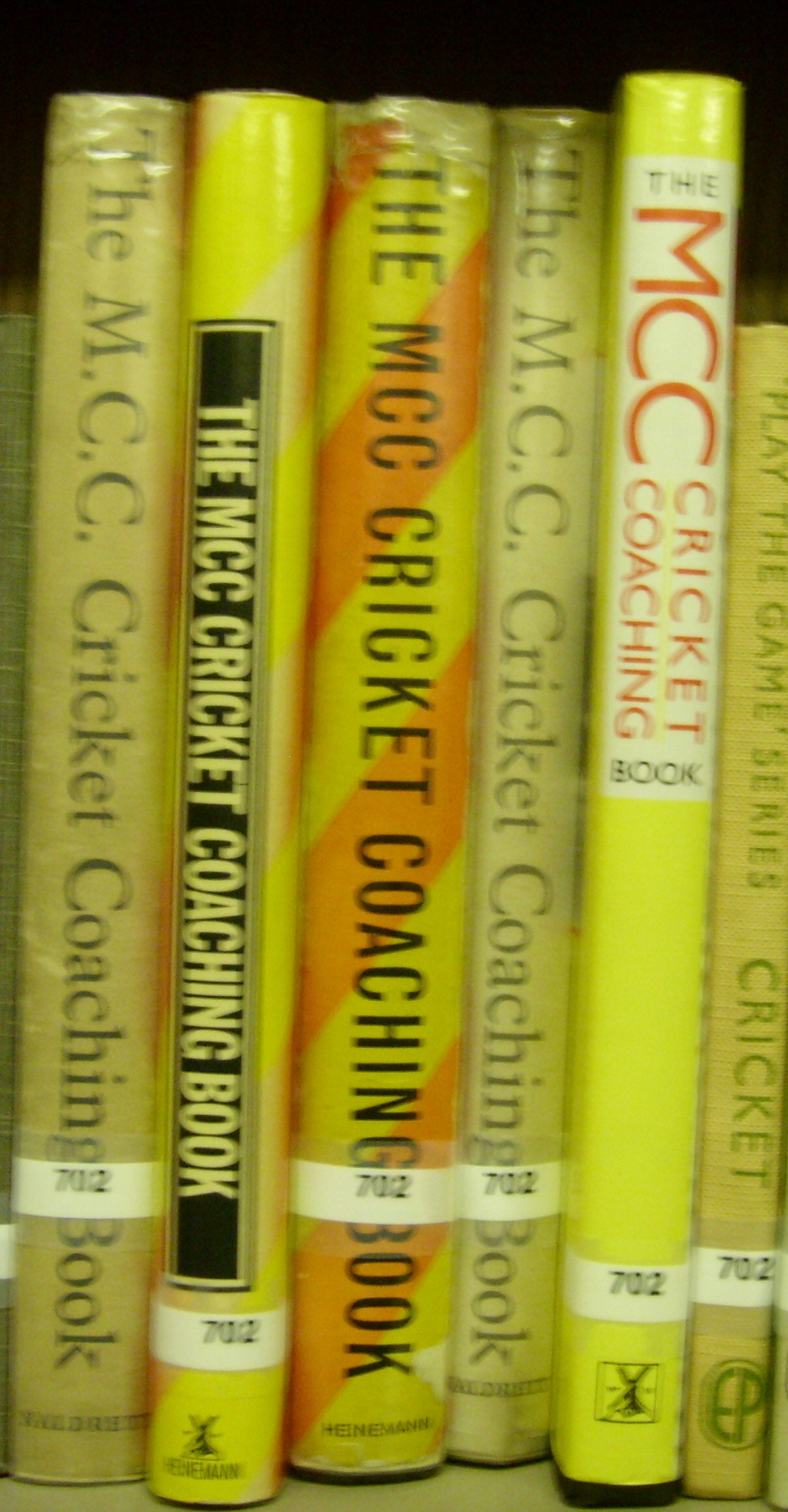
MCC coaching manuals

== Coaching ==
MCC has long had a deep involvement in coaching cricket. The club's head coach leads an extensive operation involving the running of an indoor-cricket school and a team of coaches in England and around the world. The club has traditionally produced a coaching manual, the MCC Cricket Coaching Book, a bible for cricket skills, and runs training programmes for young cricketers, including many at its Lord's Indoor Centre. MCC continues to tour around England, playing matches against various state and private schools. This tradition has been followed since the 19th century. The club has other sporting interests with both a real tennis and a squash court on site at Lord's, and golf, chess, bridge and backgammon societies.

== Club colours ==
Since Edwardian times at the beginning of the 20th century, the Marylebone Cricket Club organised England Test matches, touring overseas officially as MCC up till the 1976/77 tour of India. England cricketers last wore MCC's distinctive red and yellow-striped colours during the tour of New Zealand in 1996/97.

The true provenance of the club colours is (and probably will remain) unsubstantiated, but the MCC originally sported sky blue until well into the 19th century.

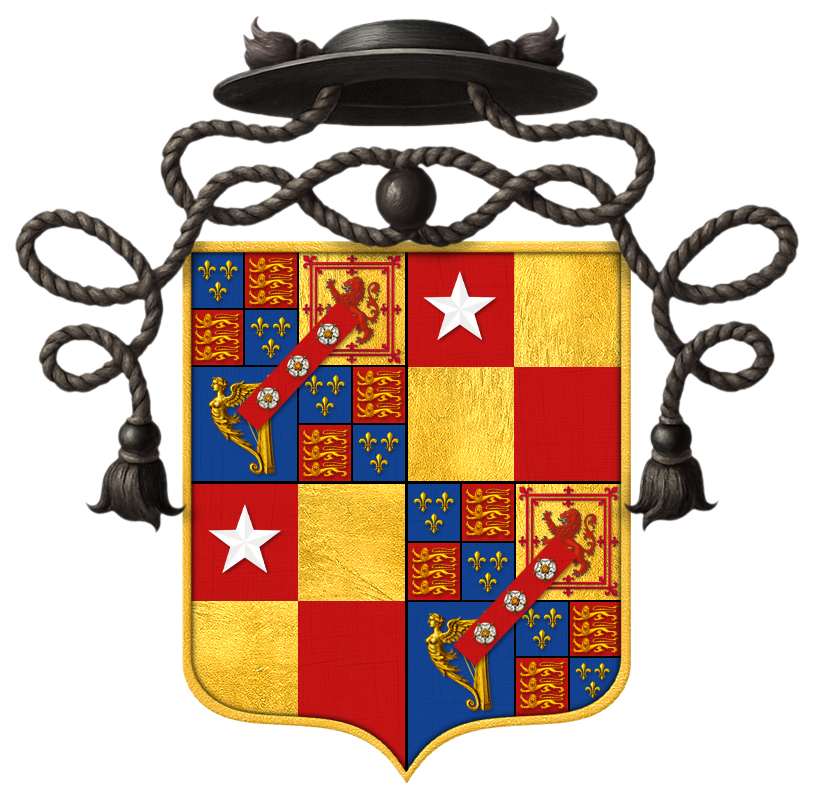
Arms of the Revd Lord Frederick Beauclerk

The Marylebone Cricket Club eventually settled on its now well-recognised colours of scarlet and gold, otherwise described as "bacon and egg". One purported theory is that they derive from the J&W Nicholson & Co. gin-distilling family, whose chairman and MCC Committee member, William Nicholson MP (1825–1909) financed the purchase of Lord's freehold in 1866.

More likely is that MCC's red and gold colours have evolved from the heraldic livery (racing) colours of key noble patrons, such as the Dukes of Richmond and kinsman, Lord Frederick Beauclerk, President of Marylebone Cricket Club in 1826.

== Image ==
Previously perceived as too traditional and elitist, MCC has adapted with the times making concerted efforts to modernise. "It would be overstating things to claim that the MCC has come full circle," admitted Andrew Miller at the beginning of October 2008, "but at a time of massive upheaval in the world game, .. [its] colours cease to represent everything that is wrong with cricket, and instead have become a touchstone for those whose greatest fear is the erosion of the game's traditional values".

== Legal status ==
Prior to 2013, MCC was an unincorporated private members' club, which status had several limitations. Since an unincorporated association cannot be a legal entity, MCC could not own property (such as Lord's Cricket Ground) in its own name. MCC could not sue anybody, nor indeed be sued (any legal action having to be taken against the Secretary & Chief Executive personally). Any successful financial claim made against the club would have to be met by the committee with liability extending to all MCC members for any shortfall in funds. The Club therefore convened a Special General Meeting in June 2012 to propose petitioning the Queen-in-Council for the incorporation of Marylebone Cricket Club by Royal Charter. Resulting from this petition, in December 2012 the MCC was granted a Royal Charter, two previous attempts having been unsuccessful.

Removing many of the barriers to simplify its administration, MCC became incorporated enabling it to hold assets in its own right, including Lord's Cricket Ground, instead of via custodian trusteeship. The Royal Charter also removed financial liability for any shortfall from its individual members, as owners of Marylebone Cricket Club.

== MCC Universities ==
From 2005 the MCC funded six university cricket academies known as the MCC Universities (MCCUs), which had previously been funded (from 2000) by the England and Wales Cricket Board (ECB). (Prior to 2010 they were known as the University Centres of Cricketing Excellence, or UCCEs.) These were based at Cambridge, Cardiff, Durham, Leeds/Bradford, Loughborough and Oxford, and incorporated a total of thirteen universities. From 2012 all six MCCUs held first-class status. Each MCCU played a trio of matches against professional county teams at the beginning of each season, with first-class status conferred on the first two of these matches. In 2018, the MCC and ECB announced that the ECB would be resuming responsibility for funding the university centres from 2020 and would run a tender process for new cities to join the scheme. The change was also said to be likely to result in more T20 cricket in the programme. Despite the ECB having resumed funding, the university teams continue to use the MCC University names.

== Officers of the MCC ==
MCC Presidents are appointed to serve an annual term (biennial terms in the 1990s), exceptions being extensions of office during World War I and World War II.

Appointed President of Marylebone Cricket Club in 1914, Lord Hawke was asked to remain in post till the end of the Great War, when Lord's was used for military (including training and recreational) purposes. Problems frequently arose but, in Wisden's view, Hawke provided "the greatest help in giving wise counsel towards their solution", liaising with Henry (then Lord) Forster, whom he nominated as his successor for 1919. Lord Hawke's tenure was exceeded only by that of Stanley Christopherson, appointed in 1939 and remaining in situ for seven years, before being succeeded in 1945 by General Sir Ronald Adam.

In his Barclay's World of Cricket essay, E. W. Swanton declares that "there is no pretence of democracy about" MCC's Presidents, commenting on how few were untitled up till the Second World War and that belonging to the aristocracy was more important than any cricketing prowess. His observation reflected societal change, although Prince Philip, former PM Sir Alec Douglas-Home, the Duke of Norfolk and his son-in-law Lord Cowdrey, served as Presidents of MCC in the latter half of the 20th century.

21st-century MCC Presidents so far include many former professional cricket players such as Tom Graveney, Derek Underwood, Mike Gatting, Matthew Fleming and Kumar Sangakkara (nominated by predecessor, Anthony Wreford), becoming the first Asian President of Marylebone Cricket Club in 2019.

List of Presidents of Marylebone Cricket Club

(Records from 1787 to 1820 were destroyed in Lord's fire of 28 July 1825.)

- 1821: Charles Gordon, Lord Strathavon
- 1822: Henry James Lloyd
- 1823: Benjamin Aislabie
- 1824: Henry Thomas Lane
- 1825: Charles James Barnett
- 1826: Lord Frederick Beauclerk
- 1827: Henry Robert Kingscote
- 1828: Algernon Frederick Greville
- 1829: John Barnard
- 1830: George Ponsonby
- 1831: William Deedes
- 1832: Henry Howard
- 1833: Herbert Jenner
- 1834: Anthony Henry Ashley
- 1835: Lord Charles Russell
- 1836: Edward Vernon Harbord, 4th Baron Suffield
- 1837: James Grimston, Viscount Grimston (also President in 1867)
- 1838: Brownlow Cecil, 2nd Marquess of Exeter
- 1839: George Stanhope, 6th Earl of Chesterfield
- 1840: James Grimston, 1st Earl of Verulam
- 1841: William Craven, 2nd Earl of Craven
- 1842: Charles Gordon-Lennox, Earl of March
- 1843: Henry Reynolds-Moreton, 2nd Earl of Ducie
- 1844: Sir John Bayley, 2nd Baronet
- 1845: Thomas Chamberlayne
- 1846: Edward Turnour, 4th Earl Winterton
- 1847: Thomas Lyon-Bowes, 12th Earl of Strathmore and Kinghorne
- 1848: Thomas Coke, 2nd Earl of Leicester
- 1849: John Bligh, 6th Earl of Darnley
- 1850: Heneage Finch, Baron Guernsey
- 1851: George Grey, 7th Earl of Stamford and Warrington
- 1852: George Hay-Drummond, Viscount Dupplin
- 1853: Henry Somerset, Marquess of Worcester (also President in 1877)
- 1854: George Vane-Tempest, Earl Vane
- 1855: Henry Paget, Earl of Uxbridge
- 1856: William Wentworth-Fitzwilliam, Viscount Milton
- 1857: Sir Frederick Hervey-Bathurst, 3rd Baronet
- 1858: Alan Stewart, Lord Garlies
- 1859: George Coventry, 9th Earl of Coventry
- 1860: Edward Bootle-Wilbraham, 2nd Baron Skelmersdale
- 1861: John Spencer, 5th Earl Spencer
- 1862: William Molyneux, 4th Earl of Sefton
- 1863: Charles Harbord, 5th Baron Suffield
- 1864: William Ward, 1st Earl of Dudley
- 1865: Robert Grosvenor, 1st Baron Ebury
- 1866: John Montagu, 7th Earl of Sandwich
- 1867: James Grimston, 2nd Earl of Verulam (also President in 1837)
- 1868: Frederick Methuen, 2nd Baron Methuen
- 1869: Henry Petty-Fitzmaurice, 5th Marquess of Lansdowne
- 1870: Sir John Scourfield
- 1871: Edward Villiers, 5th Earl of Clarendon
- 1872: Hugh Dawnay, 8th Viscount Downe
- 1873: George Cadogan, Viscount Chelsea
- 1874: James Hamilton, Marquess of Hamilton
- 1875: Sir Charles Legard, 11th Baronet
- 1876: William Denison, 2nd Baron Londesborough
- 1877: Henry Somerset, 8th Duke of Beaufort (also President in 1853)
- 1878: Francis Berkeley, 2nd Baron FitzHardinge
- 1879: William Nicholson
- 1880: Sir William Hart Dyke
- 1881: Lord George Hamilton
- 1882: Henry Strutt, 2nd Baron Belper
- 1883: The Hon. Robert Grimston
- 1884: Edward Turnour, 5th Earl Winterton
- 1885: Beilby Lawley, 3rd Baron Wenlock
- 1886: Charles Lyttelton, Baron Lyttelton
- 1887: Sir Edward Chandos Leigh
- 1888: William Montagu Douglas Scott, 6th Duke of Buccleuch
- 1889: Sir Henry James
- 1890: Gilbert Heathcote-Drummond-Willoughby, 25th Baron Willoughby de Eresby
- 1891: Vyell Edward Walker
- 1892: William Evelyn Denison
- 1893: William Legge, 6th Earl of Dartmouth
- 1894: Victor Child Villiers, 7th Earl of Jersey
- 1895: George Harris, 4th Baron Harris
- 1896: Sidney Herbert, 14th Earl of Pembroke
- 1897: Thomas Anson, 3rd Earl of Lichfield
- 1898: Alfred Lyttelton
- 1899: Sir Archibald Levin Smith
- 1900: Ivo Bligh, 8th Earl of Darnley
- 1901: Richard Curzon, 4th Earl Howe
- 1902: Allan Gibson Steel
- 1903: Richard Webster, 1st Baron Alverstone
- 1904: Henry Manners, Marquess of Granby
- 1905: Charles Ernest Green
- 1906: Walter Long, 1st Viscount Long
- 1907: Robert Reid, 1st Earl Loreburn
- 1908: Frederick Campbell, 3rd Earl Cawdor
- 1909: Edwyn Scudamore-Stanhope, 10th Earl of Chesterfield
- 1910: William Denison, 2nd Earl of Londesborough
- 1911: William Grenfell, 1st Baron Desborough
- 1912: Victor Cavendish, 9th Duke of Devonshire
- 1913: John Montagu Douglas Scott, Earl of Dalkeith
- 1914-18: Martin Hawke, 7th Baron Hawke
- 1919: Henry Forster, 1st Baron Forster
- 1920: John Egerton, 4th Earl of Ellesmere
- 1921: Sir Stanley Jackson
- 1922: Frederic Thesiger, 1st Viscount Chelmsford
- 1923: James Lowther, 1st Viscount Ullswater
- 1924: Rowland Prothero, 1st Baron Ernle
- 1925: Admiral of the Fleet Sir John de Robeck
- 1926: Thomas Brand, 3rd Viscount Hampden
- 1927: Charles Wyndham, 3rd Baron Leconfield
- 1928: George Bingham, 5th Earl of Lucan
- 1929: Field Marshal Herbert Plumer, 1st Baron Plumer
- 1930: Sir Kynaston Studd
- 1931: William Bridgeman, 1st Viscount Bridgeman
- 1932: William Legge, Viscount Lewisham
- 1933: Douglas Hogg, 1st Viscount Hailsham
- 1934: Rowland Baring, 2nd Earl of Cromer
- 1935: John Lyttelton, 9th Viscount Cobham
- 1936: Arthur Somers-Cocks, 6th Baron Somers
- 1937: John Jacob Astor
- 1938: Stanley Baldwin, 1st Earl Baldwin of Bewdley
- 1939-45: Stanley Christopherson
- 1946: General Sir Ronald Adam
- 1947: Wykeham Cornwallis, 2nd Baron Cornwallis
- 1948: Alexander Hore-Ruthven, 1st Earl of Gowrie
- 1949: Prince Philip, Duke of Edinburgh (also President in 1974)
- 1950: Sir Pelham Warner
- 1951: William Findlay
- 1952: Henry Somerset, 10th Duke of Beaufort
- 1953: Harry Primrose, 6th Earl of Rosebery
- 1954: Charles Lyttelton, 10th Viscount Cobham
- 1955: Field Marshal Harold Alexander, 1st Earl Alexander of Tunis
- 1956: Walter Monckton, 1st Viscount Monckton of Brenchley
- 1957: Bernard Fitzalan-Howard, 16th Duke of Norfolk
- 1958: Marshal Charles Portal, 1st Viscount Portal of Hungerford
- 1959: Harry Surtees Altham
- 1960: Sir Hubert Ashton
- 1961: Sir William Worsley
- 1962: Terence Nugent, 1st Baron Nugent
- 1963: Sir George Allen
- 1964: Richard Haynes Twining
- 1965: Lieutenant-General Sir Oliver Leese
- 1966: Sir Alec Douglas-Home
- 1967: Arthur Edward Robert Gilligan
- 1968: Ronald Aird
- 1969: Maurice James Carrick Allom
- 1970: Sir Cyril Hawker
- 1971: Frederick Richard Brown
- 1972: Aidan Merivale Crawley
- 1973: Harold Caccia, Baron Caccia
- 1974: Prince Philip, Duke of Edinburgh (also President in 1949)
- 1975: Cecil Gerard Alexander Paris
- 1976: William Hugh Webster
- 1977: David Graham Clark
- 1978: Charles Henry Palmer
- 1979: Stewart Cathie Griffith
- 1980: Peter Barker Howard May
- 1981: (George) Hubert Graham Doggart
- 1982: Sir Anthony Tuke
- 1983: (Arthur Henry) Alexander Dibbs
- 1984: (Francis) George Mann
- 1985: Jack Gale Wilmot Davies
- 1986: Michael Colin Cowdrey, Baron Cowdrey of Tonbridge
- 1987: John James Warr
- 1988: Field Marshal Edwin Bramall, Baron Bramall
- 1989: Sir Denys Roberts
- 1990: Hugh Griffiths, Baron Griffiths
- 1991: Michael Edward Lovelace Melluish
- 1992-93: Dennis Raoul Whitehall Silk
- 1994-95: Sir Oliver Popplewell
- 1996-97: (Alexander) Colin David Ingleby-Mackenzie
- 1998-99: Anthony Robert Lewis
- 2000: Robert Alexander, Baron Alexander of Weedon
- 2001: Edward Ralph Dexter
- 2002: Sir Timothy Rice
- 2003: Charles Anthony Fry
- 2004: Thomas William Graveney
- 2005: Robin Geoffrey Marlar
- 2006: Douglas John Insole
- 2007: (John) Michael Brearley
- 2008: Derek Leslie Underwood
- 2009: John Robert Troutbeck Barclay
- 2010: Christopher Dennis Alexander Martin-Jenkins
- 2011: (Richard) Phillip Hodson
- 2012: Mike Grenville Griffith
- 2013: Michael William Gatting
- 2014: (Frederick) David Morgan
- 2015: Roger David Verdon Knight
- 2016: Matthew Valentine Fleming
- 2017: Ian MacLaurin, Baron MacLaurin of Knebworth
- 2018: Anthony William Wreford
- 2019-20: Kumar Chokshanada Sangakkara
- 2021: Clare Joanne Connor
- 2022: Sir Stephen Fry
- 2023: Mark Charles Jefford Nicholas
- 2024: Mervyn King, Baron King of Lothbury
- 2025: Edward Thomas Smith

Presidents of MCC are required to nominate a successor at the Annual General Meeting (AGM) during their term of office. The MCC Chairman and Treasurer each serve a three-year term, both being appointed by the MCC Committee (subject to approval of the voting members), and can serve successive terms.
The Secretary & Chief Executive to Marylebone Cricket Club (a combined role) is the club's senior employee, appointed solely by the MCC Committee.

=== MCC Secretaries ===
The first Secretary to the Marylebone Cricket Club was engaged in 1822, a title which changed in 2000, under Roger Knight's tenure, to become Secretary and Chief Executive. Holders of this office have been:

- Benjamin Aislabie (1822–1842)
- Roger Kynaston (1842–1858)
- Alfred Baillie (1858–1863)
- Fitz Fitzgerald (1863–1876)
- Henry Perkins (1876–1898)
- Sir Francis Lacey (1898–1926)
- William Findlay (1926–1936)
- Rowan Rait Kerr (1936–1952)
- Ronnie Aird (1952–1962)
- Billy Griffith (1962–1974)
- Jack Bailey (1974–1987)
- John Stephenson (1987–1994)
- Roger Knight (1994–2006)
- Keith Bradshaw (2006–2011)
- Derek Brewer (2011–2017)
- Guy Lavender (2017–2024)
- Robert Lawson (2025–)

== Bibliography ==
- ACS (1982). A Guide to First-Class Cricket Matches Played in the British Isles. Nottingham: ACS.
- ACS (1981). A Guide to Important Cricket Matches Played in the British Isles 1709 – 1863. Nottingham: ACS.
- Altham, H. S. (1962). A History of Cricket, Volume 1 (to 1914). George Allen & Unwin.
- Birley, Derek (1999). A Social History of English Cricket. Aurum. ISBN 1-85410-710-0.
- Bowen, Rowland (1970). Cricket: A History of its Growth and Development. Eyre & Spottiswoode.
- Buckley, G. B. (1935). Fresh Light on 18th Century Cricket. Cotterell.
- Pope, Mick; Dyson, Paul (2001). 100 Greats – Yorkshire County Cricket Club. Tempus.
- Swanton, E. W. (1986). MCC Secretaries. Willow Books. ISBN 978-00-02181-93-8.
- Warner, Pelham (1946). Lord's 1787–1945. Harrap.

=== Further reading ===
- Green, Stephen (2003). Lord's: Cathedral of Cricket. The History Press Ltd.
- Rice, Jonathan (2006). Presidents of MCC. Methuen Publishing.
- Thévoz, Seth Alexander (2025). London Clubland: A Companion for the Curious. Robinson/Little, Brown. ISBN 978-1472149985.
- Wright, Graeme (2005). Wisden at Lord's. John Wisden & Co. Ltd.
