= List of Kent County Cricket Club Twenty20 cricket records =

This article is a list of Kent County Cricket Club Twenty20 cricket records; that is, a record of team and individual performances in Twenty20 cricket for the Kent County Cricket Club.

Kent played their first Twenty20 match in the domestic 2003 Twenty20 Cup against Hampshire at Beckenham. The club has played in each of the domestic Twenty20 competitions since, winning the competition in 2007 and 2021, and finishing as runners-up in 2008. The club plays Twenty20 cricket under the name Kent Spitfires, an allusion to the role of the Supermarine Spitfire in the Battle of Britain during 1940, much of which took place in the skies over the county. As of July 2021, the club has played over 220 Twenty20 matches, including two matches against touring international teams.

== Team records ==
As of June 2025:

- Highest total for: 236/3 vs Essex at Canterbury, 2021
- Highest total against: 250/6 by Surrey at Canterbury, 2018
- Lowest total for: 72 all out vs Hampshire at The Rose Bowl, 2011
- Lowest total against: 80 all out by Middlesex at Lord's, 2021

=== Partnerships ===
The highest partnership for Kent is 207 runs scored for the 1st wicket by Daniel Bell-Drummond and Joe Denly against Essex at Chelmsford in 2017. This set a new highest first-wicket stand in all Twenty20 cricket globally and became the third highest partnership for any wicket in the form of the game and the highest in the English domestic T20 competition. It surpassed the 163 runs the same players had scored earlier in the season against Surrey at The Oval which had, in turn, bettered Kent's previous highest partnership of 151 made the previous season by Bell-Drummond and Sam Northeast and the county's highest opening partnership of 150 scored between Bell-Drummond and Denly, also in 2016.

Highest partnership for each wicket
Partnership	Runs	Players		Opposition	Venue	Season
1st wicket	207	Joe Denly	Daniel Bell-Drummond	v Essex	County Ground, Chelmsford	2017
2nd wicket	157	Joe Denly	Jordan Cox	v Middlesex	St Lawrence Ground, Canterbury	2022
3rd wicket	130	Azhar Mahmood	Martin van Jaarsveld	v Leicestershire	Grace Road, Leicester	2011
4th wicket	106	Sam Billings	Marcus Stoinis	v Essex	St Lawrence Ground, Canterbury	2018
5th wicket	123	Jack Leaning	Jordan Cox	v Middlesex	St Lawrence Ground, Canterbury	2021
6th wicket	108*	Sam Northeast	Alex Blake	v Hampshire	Southampton	2015
7th wicket	62	Rob Key	Tyron Henderson	v Hampshire	County Cricket Ground, Beckenham	2006
8th wicket	52	Fabian Cowdrey	James Tredwell	v Lancashire	St Lawrence Ground, Canterbury	2015
9th wicket	33*	Ryan McLaren	Simon Cook	v Surrey	County Cricket Ground, Beckenham	2007
10th wicket	31	Mitchell Claydon	David Griffiths	v Essex	St Lawrence Ground, Canterbury	2016

== Individual batting records ==
Eight batsmen have scored centuries for Kent in Twenty20 cricket, with two having done so on more than one occasion. Joe Denly has scored five centuries for the team in T20 cricket and Daniel Bell-Drummond three. Denly recording the two highest individual scores in the format for the county, both made in 2017. He scored 116 not out made against Surrey at The Oval in July followed by a score of 127 made against Essex at Chelmsford in August.

Andrew Symonds scored Kent's first T20 century in 2004, scoring 112 runs against Middlesex at Maidstone. Symonds scored his century in 34 balls, at the time a record for the fastest century in T20 cricket. As of May 2024 it is the fifth-quickest century scored in top-level T20 matches worldwide and the joint-fastest scored in the UK. The other Kent centurions in T20 matches are Azhar Mahmood, Sam Northeast, Zak Crawley, Sam Billings and, most recently, Tawanda Muyeye.

Thirteen players have scored more than 1,000 runs for the county in the format, with Denly the leading run scorer in Twenty20 cricket for the team.

- Highest individual score: 127 Joe Denly vs Essex at Chelmsford, 2017
- Most runs in a season: 641 Sam Northeast, 2015
- Most career runs: 4,851 Joe Denly, 2004–present

== Individual bowling records ==
Six bowlers have taken five wickets in a Twenty20 innings for Kent, Wahab Riaz in 2011, Mitchell Claydon in 2013, Adam Milne in 2017, Imran Qayyum in 2019, Matt Milnes in 2021 and, most recently, Matt Parkinson in 2025. Adam Milne's five wickets for the cost of 11 runs in against Somerset in 2017 is the best bowling analysis for a Kent player.

Seven bowlers have taken hat-tricks for Kent in the format. Ryan McLaren was the first to do so, doing so in the 2007 Twenty20 Cup final against Gloucestershire, Kent's first Twenty20 final success. Wahab Riaz took a hat-trick in 2011 against Gloucestershire as part of his five-wicket haul, Matt Coles took one in 2017 against Middlesex and Joe Denly, primarily a batsman, took one in 2018 against Surrey in a match in which he also scored a century. Adam Milne took a hat-trick from the final three balls of a match against Surrey in 2021, Grant Stewart repeated the feat across two overs against Middlesex during the 2023 season, and Matt Parkinson took one on his Twenty20 debut for the team in 2024 against Middlesex.

Only James Tredwell and Darren Stevens have taken more than 100 T20 wickets in total for the county as of June 2025.

- Best bowling: 5/11 Adam Milne vs Somerset at Taunton, 2017
- Most wickets in a season: 24 Grant Stewart, 2023
- Most career wickets: 119 James Tredwell, 2003–2017

== See also ==
- List of Kent County Cricket Club first-class cricket records
- List of Kent County Cricket Club List A cricket records
