= Kent County Cricket Club in 2007 =

Kent County Cricket Club
2007 season
- Coach: (South Africa) Graham Ford
- Captain: (England) Rob Key
- Overseas players: (Pakistan) Yasir Arafat (South Africa) Andrew Hall (May–July) (Sri Lanka) Lasith Malinga (August) (South Africa) Morné Morkel (June–July; Twenty20 only)
- Ground(s): St Lawrence Ground, Canterbury; Nevill Ground, Tunbridge Wells; County Ground, Beckenham
- County Championship: 7th, Division One
- Friends Provident Trophy: 4th, South Conference
- Natwest Pro40: 5th, Division Two
- Twenty20 Cup: Champions
- Most runs: FC: RWT Key (1,250); LA: RWT Key (695); T20: RWT Key (282)
- Most wickets: FC: R McLaren (44); LA: SJ Cook (27); T20: SJ Cook (17)
- Most catches: FC: M van Jaarsveld (17); LA: M van Jaarsveld (16); T20: R McLaren (9)
- Most wicket-keeping dismissals: FC: GO Jones (46); LA: GO Jones (20); T20: GO Jones (6)

In 2007, Kent County Cricket Club competed in Division One of the County Championship, the South Conference of the 50-over Friends Provident Trophy, Division Two of the NatWest Pro40 and the South Division of the Twenty20 Cup. Kent also hosted a List A match against the touring Sri Lanka A team and a three-day match without first-class status against Cardiff UCCE, both at the St Lawrence Ground.

The team narrowly avoided relegation from Division One of the County Championship, with a number of matches affected by rain including one match in Worcester that was abandoned without a ball being bowled. In List A cricket, Kent finished mid-table in both the South Conference of the Friends Provident Trophy and Division Two of the Natwest Pro40 (although they only missed out on promotion in the latter tournament by a single point).

The highlight of the season was victory at finals day of the Twenty20 Cup at Edgbaston on 4 August. Kent defeated Sussex in their semi-final by 5 wickets, and then later in the day beat Gloucestershire by 4 wickets – aided by a hat-trick by Ryan McLaren – to win the title for the first time.

== Squad ==
Rob Key was re-appointed as club captain ahead of the 2007 season. Key lead a new-look squad, including overseas signing Yasir Arafat (the Pakistan all-rounder joined after having played for Sussex in 2006). Yasir would be Kent's second overseas player for 2007, joining South African all-rounder Andrew Hall. Following the 2006 season, Kent had released former captain David Fulton, wicket-keeper Niall O'Brien and bowlers Simon Cusden, Matthew Dennington and David Stiff.

Due to international commitments, Hall was away from the county during the group stage of the Twenty20 Cup in the second half of June and early July. Kent signed another South African, fast bowler Morné Morkel, to play in these eight T20 matches. After returning for two County Championship matches, Hall then left the county again in late-July and this time was replaced by Sri Lankan fast bowler Lasith Malinga on a short-term contract until the end of the season.

Left-arm spinner Min Patel retained the vice-captaincy, but injury restricted him to just a single championship appearance plus the tour match against Sri Lanka A (in which he captained a mostly young team) and he retired at the end of the season. Patel made his debut for Kent in 1989, earned two Test caps for England in 1996, and took a total of 630 first class wickets as well as 88 in List A and 15 in Twenty20 cricket (he played very little limited overs cricket in the latter years of his career). Patel had been at Kent throughout his career, also playing a short spell for Central Districts in New Zealand ahead of the 2006 English summer.

=== Squad list ===
- Ages given as of the first day of the County Championship season, 18 April 2007.

| Name | Nationality | Birth date | Batting style | Bowling style | Notes |
Batsmen
| Alex Blake | England | 25 January 1989 (aged 18) | Left-handed | Right arm medium-fast | |
| Joe Denly | England | 16 March 1986 (aged 21) | Right-handed | Right arm leg break | |
| Neil Dexter | England | 21 August 1984 (aged 22) | Right-handed | Right arm medium-fast | |
| James Goodman | England | 19 November 1990 (aged 16) | Right-handed | Right arm medium | |
| Rob Key | England | 12 May 1979 (aged 27) | Right-handed | Right arm off break | Club captain |
| Sam Northeast | England | 16 October 1989 (aged 17) | Right-handed | Right arm off break | |
| Martin van Jaarsveld | South Africa | 18 June 1974 (aged 32) | Right-handed | Right arm medium / Right arm off break | Kolpak player |
| Matt Walker | England | 2 January 1974 (aged 33) | Left-handed | Right arm medium | |
All-rounders
| Andrew Hall | South Africa | 31 July 1975 (aged 31) | Right-handed | Right arm fast-medium | Overseas player (until late July) |
| Ryan McLaren | South Africa | 9 February 1983 (aged 24) | Left-handed | Right arm medium-fast | Kolpak player |
| Darren Stevens | England | 30 April 1976 (aged 30) | Right-handed | Right arm medium | |
| Yasir Arafat | Pakistan | 12 March 1982 (aged 25) | Right-handed | Right arm fast-medium | Overseas player |
Wicket-keepers
| Paul Dixey | England | 2 November 1987 (aged 19) | Right-handed | — | |
| Geraint Jones | England | 14 July 1979 (aged 27) | Right-handed | — | |
Bowlers
| Simon Cook | England | 15 January 1977 (aged 30) | Right-handed | Right arm medium-fast | |
| James Iles | England | 11 February 1990 (aged 17) | Right-handed | Right arm medium-fast | |
| Robbie Joseph | England | 20 January 1982 (aged 25) | Right-handed | Right arm fast | |
| Amjad Khan | England | 14 October 1980 (aged 26) | Right-handed | Right arm fast-medium | |
| Lasith Malinga | Sri Lanka | 28 August 1983 (aged 23) | Right-handed | Right arm fast | Overseas player (replaced Andrew Hall from late July) |
| Morné Morkel | South Africa | 6 October 1984 (aged 22) | Left-handed | Right arm fast | Overseas player (Twenty20 Cup group stage only) |
| Tom Parsons | England | 2 May 1987 (aged 19) | Right-handed | Right arm fast-medium | |
| Min Patel | England | 7 July 1970 (aged 36) | Right-handed | Slow left arm orthodox | Vice-captain |
| Martin Saggers | England | 23 May 1972 (aged 34) | Right-handed | Right arm fast-medium | |
| James Tredwell | England | 27 February 1982 (aged 25) | Left-handed | Right arm off break | |

== County Championship ==
=== Division One ===
| Team | Pld | W | T | L | D | A | Bat | Bwl | Adj | Pts |
|---|---|---|---|---|---|---|---|---|---|---|
| Sussex | 16 | 7 | 0 | 3 | 5 | 1 | 37 | 43 | 0 | 202 |
| Durham | 16 | 7 | 0 | 5 | 4 | 0 | 38 | 47 | –1½ | 197½ |
| Lancashire | 16 | 5 | 0 | 2 | 8 | 1 | 40 | 44 | 0 | 190 |
| Surrey | 16 | 5 | 0 | 4 | 6 | 1 | 41 | 40 | –1 | 178 |
| Hampshire | 16 | 5 | 0 | 3 | 8 | 0 | 32 | 43 | 0 | 177 |
| Yorkshire | 16 | 4 | 0 | 4 | 8 | 0 | 49 | 38 | 0 | 175 |
| Kent | 16 | 3 | 0 | 5 | 7 | 1 | 43 | 36 | 0 | 153 |
| Warwickshire | 16 | 2 | 0 | 5 | 9 | 0 | 40 | 38 | 0 | 139 |
| Worcestershire | 16 | 1 | 0 | 8 | 5 | 2 | 18 | 35 | 0 | 95 |

=== Matches ===
| 16–19 April | Kent | v | (H) Sussex | Sussex won by 8 wickets |
| Scorecard | 216 (59.2 overs); R McLaren 44 (73); Mushtaq Ahmed 6/74 (21.3 overs) | | 510 (156.2 overs); RR Montgomerie 175 (445); RH Joseph 3/78 (22 overs) | County Ground, Hove; Umpires: NGC Cowley and JF Steele |
| Scorecard | 349 (88.1 overs); JL Denly 63 (87); Naved-ul-Hasan 4/106 (24 overs) | | 57/2 (8.1 overs); 33* (54); Yasir Arafat 1/10 (3.1 overs) | County Ground, Hove; Umpires: NGC Cowley and JF Steele |
Kent won the toss and elected to bat; Points: Sussex 22, Kent 3

| 2–3 May | Kent (H) | v | Sussex | Kent won by an innings and 106 runs |
| Scorecard | 368 (96.3 overs); Yasir Arafat 122 (162); RSC Martin-Jenkins 5/67 (23.3 overs) | | 102 (33.3 overs); CJ Adams 42 (56); R McLaren 4/12 (7.3 overs) | St Lawrence Ground, Canterbury; Umpires: RJ Bailey and VA Holder |
| Scorecard | | | 160 (42.5 overs) (f/o); MJ Prior 35 (25); SJ Cook 6/35 (13.5 overs) | St Lawrence Ground, Canterbury; Umpires: RJ Bailey and VA Holder |
Kent won the toss and elected to bat; Points: Kent 21, Sussex 3

| 9–12 May | Durham (H) | v | Kent | Durham won by 157 runs |
| Scorecard | 407 (86.5 overs); MJ Di Venuto 204* (248); JC Tredwell 4/88 (27 overs) | | 400 (113.3 overs); RWT Key 169 (279); LE Plunkett 5/105 (32 overs) | Riverside Ground, Chester-le-Street; Umpires: NL Bainton and NA Mallender |
| Scorecard | 319/6d (72.5 overs); DM Benkenstein 77* (135); AJ Hall 4/68 (17 overs) | | 169 (50.3 overs); JL Denly 92 (137); SJ Harmison 5/61 (19.3 overs) | Riverside Ground, Chester-le-Street; Umpires: NL Bainton and NA Mallender |
Durham won the toss and elected to bat; Points: Durham 22, Kent 8

| 23–26 May | Kent (H) | v | Hampshire | Match drawn |
| Scorecard | 199 (58.4 overs); JL Denly 115* (189); SR Clark 4/48 (14 overs) | | 272 (84.3 overs); AD Mascarenhas 90 (146); Yasir Arafat 5/63 (21.3 overs) | St Lawrence Ground, Canterbury; Umpires: B Leadbeater and RT Robinson |
| Scorecard | 533/8d (149 overs); RWT Key 120 (221); SR Clark 3/80 (28 overs) | | 275/5 (89 overs); SM Ervine 56* (100); Yasir Arafat 4/90 (23 overs) | St Lawrence Ground, Canterbury; Umpires: B Leadbeater and RT Robinson |
Kent won the toss and elected to bat; Points: Kent 7, Hampshire 9

| 30 May – 2 June | Surrey (H) | v | Kent | Kent won by an innings and 79 runs |
| Scorecard | 166 (44 overs); MJ Nicholson 48* (53); AJ Hall 5/59 (17 overs) | | 564/5d (123.2 overs); DI Stevens 174 (202); Mohammad Akram 1/81 (27 overs) | Whitgift School, Croydon; Umpires: PJ Hartley and JW Lloyds |
| Scorecard | 319 (92.1 overs); MR Ramprakash 108 (239); JC Tredwell 3/53 (16.1 overs) | | | Whitgift School, Croydon; Umpires: PJ Hartley and JW Lloyds |
Kent won the toss and elected to field; Points: Surrey 1, Kent 22

| 6–9 June | Yorkshire | v | (H) Kent | Match drawn |
| Scorecard | 551/8d (166.2 overs); JJ Sayers 187 (379); DI Stevens 3/91 (27.2 overs) | | 292 (84.5 overs); AJ Hall 77 (89); D Gough 6/47 (16.2 overs) | Nevill Ground, Tunbridge Wells; Umpires: RK Illingworth and P Willey |
| Scorecard | | | 383/6 (129 overs) (f/o); JC Tredwell 116* (233); TT Bresnan 2/82 (22 overs) | Nevill Ground, Tunbridge Wells; Umpires: RK Illingworth and P Willey |
Yorkshire won the toss and elected to bat; Points: Kent 7, Yorkshire 11

| 15–18 June | Lancashire (H) | v | Kent | Lancashire won by 8 wickets |
| Scorecard | 451/5d (112 overs); BJ Hodge 156* (200); JL Denly 1/34 (8 overs) | | 272 (88.4 overs); JL Denly 77 (118); M Muralitharan 4/73 (34 overs) | Old Trafford, Manchester; Umpires: JH Evans and MJ Harris |
| Scorecard | 12/2 (2.5 overs); MB Loye 8* (6); SJ Cook 2/9 (1.5 overs) | | 190 (63 overs) (f/o); M van Jaarsveld 85 (168); M Muralitharan 4/72 (25 overs) | Old Trafford, Manchester; Umpires: JH Evans and MJ Harris |
Lancashire won the toss and elected to bat; Points: Lancashire 22, Kent 3

| 8–11 July | Worcestershire (H) | v | Kent | Match abandoned without a ball bowled |
| Scorecard | | | | New Road, Worcester; Umpires: MJD Bodenham and RA Kettleborough |
No toss; Rescheduled for 30 July, cancelled 26 July; Points: Worcestershire 4, Kent 4

| 20–23 July | Kent (H) | v | Warwickshire | Match drawn |
| Scorecard | 550/9d (156 overs); M van Jaarsveld 117 (226); IJL Trott 2/33 (12 overs) | | 107 (36.3 overs); DL Maddy 23 (30); R McLaren 5/24 (11 overs) | St Lawrence Ground, Canterbury; Umpires: VA Holder and G Sharp |
| Scorecard | | | 268/7 (109.2 overs) (f/o); DL Maddy 148* (334); R McLaren 3/46 (23 overs) | St Lawrence Ground, Canterbury; Umpires: VA Holder and G Sharp |
Kent won the toss and elected to bat; Points: Kent 12, Warwickshire 6

| 25–28 July | Kent | v | (H) Yorkshire | Match drawn |
| Scorecard | 486 (124.3 overs); JL Denly 114 (212); AU Rashid 5/112 (23.3 overs) | | 550/9d (144.5 overs); Younis Khan 217* (252); R McLaren 4/89 (28 overs) | North Marine Road Ground, Scarborough; Umpires: NL Bainton and GI Burgess |
| Scorecard | 17/0 (10 overs); JL Denly 11* (37) | | | North Marine Road Ground, Scarborough; Umpires: NL Bainton and GI Burgess |
Kent won the toss and elected to bat; Points: Yorkshire 12, Kent 11

| 8–9 August | Kent (H) | v | Surrey | Surrey won by 4 wickets |
| Scorecard | 150 (60.4 overs); RWT Key 75* (176); Harbhajan Singh 5/34 (19.4 overs) | | 215 (62 overs); MR Ramprakash 61 (130); JC Tredwell 6/47 (16 overs) | St Lawrence Ground, Canterbury; Umpires: NGB Cook and RK Illingworth |
| Scorecard | 171 (58.3 overs); JC Tredwell 50 (82); Harbhajan Singh 6/57 (23.3 overs) | | 108/6 (24 overs); Harbhajan Singh 29 (22); JL Denly 2/13 (2 overs) | St Lawrence Ground, Canterbury; Umpires: NGB Cook and RK Illingworth |
Kent won the toss and elected to bat; Points: Kent 3, Surrey 18

| 14–17 August | Warwickshire (H) | v | Kent | Match drawn |
| Scorecard | 213 (59.5 overs); LC Parker 49 (74); R McLaren 4/42 (13 overs) | | 400/4d (121.3 overs); RWT Key 153 (268) | Edgbaston, Birmingham; Umpires: GI Burgess and AA Jones |
Warwickshire who the toss and elected to bat; No play on days 1 or 2 due to rain; Points: Warwickshire 6, Kent 12

| 21–24 August | Kent (H) | v | Worcestershire | Match drawn |
| Scorecard | forfeited | | forfeited | St Lawrence Ground, Canterbury; Umpires: B Dudleston and SA Garratt |
| Scorecard | 293/3d (65 overs); RWT Key 125 (149); RJ Sillence 1/44 (10 overs) | | 110/3 (21 overs); VS Solanki 42 (31); MJ Saggers 3/37 (7 overs) | St Lawrence Ground, Canterbury; Umpires: B Dudleston and SA Garratt |
Worcestershire won the toss and elected to field; No play on days 1, 2 or 3 due to rain; Points: Kent 4, Worcestershire 4

| 28–31 August | Kent (H) | v | Lancashire | Match drawn |
| Scorecard | 327 (110 overs); MJ Walker 142 (271); G Chapple 3/63 (22 overs) | | 317 (96.4 overs); G Chapple 88 (81); MJ Saggers 5/43 (25.4 overs) | St Lawrence Ground, Canterbury; Umpires: B Leadbeater and RT Robinson |
| Scorecard | 419/6d (112.4 overs); RWT Key 182 (332); OJ Newby 2/74 (15.4 overs) | | 208/3 (67 overs); PJ Horton 69 (100); MJ Saggers 1/22 (14 overs) | St Lawrence Ground, Canterbury; Umpires: B Leadbeater and RT Robinson |
Lancashire won the toss and elected to field; Points: Kent 10, Lancashire 10

| 11–13 September | Kent | v | (H) Hampshire | Kent won by 10 wickets |
| Scorecard | 495 (146.3 overs); M van Jaarsveld 112 (197); SK Warne 4/134 (44.3 overs) | | 216 (63.4 overs) (f/o); MA Carberry 46 (77); JC Tredwell 4/46 (23 overs) | Rose Bowl, Southampton; Umpires: R Palmer and G Sharp |
| Scorecard | 6/0 (0.3 overs); JL Denly 6* (3); 282 (100.4 overs) | | MJ Lumb 89 (181); JC Tredwell 4/114 (44 overs) | Rose Bowl, Southampton; Umpires: R Palmer and G Sharp |
Kent won the toss and elected to bat; Points: Hampshire 3, Kent 22

| 19–21 September | Kent (H) | v | Durham | Durham won by 8 wickets |
| Scorecard | 212 (50.5 overs); R McLaren 54* (55); M Davies 3/43 (11.5 overs) | | 321 (88 overs); DM Benkenstein 117 (181); MJ Saggers 4/89 (28 overs) | St Lawrence Ground, Canterbury; Umpires: JH Evans and G Sharp |
| Scorecard | 160 (44.1 overs); RWT Key 33 (61); PJ Wiseman 4/45 (12.1 overs) | | 52/2 (10.1 overs); MJ Di Venuto 23* (21); MJ Walker 1/10 (2 overs) | St Lawrence Ground, Canterbury; Umpires: JH Evans and G Sharp |
Kent won the toss and elected to bat; Points: Kent 4, Durham 20 SA Northeast made his first-class debut

== Friends Provident Trophy ==
=== South Conference ===
| Team | Pld | W | T | L | NR | Pts | NRR |
|---|---|---|---|---|---|---|---|
| Hampshire Hawks | 9 | 6 | 1 | 1 | 1 | 14 | +0.315 |
| Essex Eagles | 9 | 6 | 0 | 2 | 1 | 13 | +1.050 |
| Gloucestershire Gladiators | 9 | 6 | 0 | 2 | 1 | 13 | +0.125 |
| Kent Spitfires | 9 | 5 | 0 | 3 | 1 | 11 | +0.889 |
| Surrey Brown Caps | 9 | 4 | 0 | 3 | 2 | 10 | +0.779 |
| Somerset Sabres | 9 | 4 | 1 | 3 | 1 | 10 | +0.198 |
| Middlesex Crusaders | 9 | 3 | 0 | 5 | 1 | 7 | −0.377 |
| Sussex Sharks | 9 | 2 | 0 | 5 | 2 | 6 | −0.687 |
| Glamorgan Dragons | 9 | 0 | 0 | 6 | 3 | 3 | −1.416 |
| Ireland | 9 | 0 | 0 | 6 | 3 | 3 | −1.793 |

=== Matches ===
| 22 April | Kent; 271 (46.2 overs) | v | (H) Surrey; 274/7 (48.5 overs) | Surrey won by 3 wickets (with 7 balls remaining) |
| Scorecard | Kent; 271 (46.2 overs) | v | (H) Surrey; 274/7 (48.5 overs) | The Oval, Kennington, London; Umpires: TE Jesty and RT Robinson |
| Scorecard | RWT Key 108 (108); SJ Magoffin 4/58 (8.2 overs) | | SA Newman 73 (101); Yasir Arafat 3/60 (10 overs) | The Oval, Kennington, London; Umpires: TE Jesty and RT Robinson |
| Kent won the toss and elected to bat; Points: Surrey 2, Kent 0 RWT Key and JC Tredwell set a Kent List A record for the 8th wicket, scoring 174 runs | | | | The Oval, Kennington, London; Umpires: TE Jesty and RT Robinson |

| 29 April | Kent; 231/7 (50 overs) | v | (H) Ireland; 173 (43.5 overs) | Kent won by 58 runs |
| Scorecard | Kent; 231/7 (50 overs) | v | (H) Ireland; 173 (43.5 overs) | Civil Service Cricket Club, Belfast; Umpires: TE Jesty and AA Jones |
| Scorecard | JL Denly 102* (97); JF Mooney 2/29 (9.1 overs) | | WK McCallan 45* (54); SJ Cook 3/31 (10 overs) | Civil Service Cricket Club, Belfast; Umpires: TE Jesty and AA Jones |
| Ireland won the toss and elected to field; Points: Ireland 0, Kent 2 | | | | Civil Service Cricket Club, Belfast; Umpires: TE Jesty and AA Jones |

| 6 May | Kent; 234 (47.5 overs) | v | (H) Essex; 237/7 (49.4 overs) | Kent won by 3 wickets (with 2 balls remaining) |
| Scorecard | Kent; 234 (47.5 overs) | v | (H) Essex; 237/7 (49.4 overs) | County Ground, Chelmsford; Umpires: RJ Bailey and JF Steele |
| Scorecard | RC Irani 81 (100); Yasir Arafat 3/51 (8.5 overs) | | DI Stevens 61 (64); RN ten Doeschate 1/21 (3.4 overs) | County Ground, Chelmsford; Umpires: RJ Bailey and JF Steele |
| Essex won the toss and elected to bat; Points: Essex 0, Kent 2 | | | | County Ground, Chelmsford; Umpires: RJ Bailey and JF Steele |

| 7 May | Middlesex; 233/5 (41 overs) | v | (H) Kent; 202/5 (29.2 overs) | Kent won by 5 wickets (with 16 balls remaining) (D/L method) |
| Scorecard | Middlesex; 233/5 (41 overs) | v | (H) Kent; 202/5 (29.2 overs) | St Lawrence Ground, Canterbury; Umpires: B Dudleston and AA Jones |
| Scorecard | OA Shah 95* (89); SJ Cook 2/46 (9 overs) | | M van Jaarsveld 86* (65); M Kartik 2/31 (6 overs) | St Lawrence Ground, Canterbury; Umpires: B Dudleston and AA Jones |
| Kent won the toss and elected to bat; Match reduced to 41 overs per side before play began; further rain in the lunch break reduced Kent's inning to 32 overs with a D/L target of 200 runs; Points: Kent 2, Middlesex 0 | | | | St Lawrence Ground, Canterbury; Umpires: B Dudleston and AA Jones |

| 20 May | Glamorgan; 85 (31.5 overs) | v | (H) Kent; 87/1 (11.4 overs) | Kent won by 9 wickets (with 230 balls remaining) |
| Scorecard | Glamorgan; 85 (31.5 overs) | v | (H) Kent; 87/1 (11.4 overs) | St Lawrence Ground, Canterbury; Umpires: JW Holder and NA Mallender |
| Scorecard | DL Hemp 25 (47); SJ Cook 4/25 (9.5 overs) | | GO Jones 44* (37); AG Wharf 1/36 (5 overs) | St Lawrence Ground, Canterbury; Umpires: JW Holder and NA Mallender |
| Glamorgan won the toss and elected to bat; Points: Kent 2, Glamorgan 0 | | | | St Lawrence Ground, Canterbury; Umpires: JW Holder and NA Mallender |

| 27 May | Somerset (H) | v | Kent | No result (match abandoned without a toss) |
| Scorecard | Somerset (H) | v | Kent | County Ground, Taunton; Umpires: B Dudleston and MJ Harris |
| No toss; Points: Somerset 1, Kent 1 | | | | County Ground, Taunton; Umpires: B Dudleston and MJ Harris |

| 3 June | Kent; 264/9 (50 overs) | v | (H) Sussex; 152 (33.4 overs) | Kent won by 112 runs |
| Scorecard | Kent; 264/9 (50 overs) | v | (H) Sussex; 152 (33.4 overs) | County Ground, Hove; Umpires: NL Bainton and MJD Bodenham |
| Scorecard | AJ Hall 123 (131); RJ Kirtley 5/41 (10 overs) | | MJ Prior 76 (72); Yasir Arafat 3/20 (8 overs) | County Ground, Hove; Umpires: NL Bainton and MJD Bodenham |
| Sussex won the toss and elected to field; Points: Sussex 0, Kent 2 | | | | County Ground, Hove; Umpires: NL Bainton and MJD Bodenham |

| 10 June | Hampshire; 220 (49.4 overs) | v | (H) Kent; 218 (49.3 overs) | Hampshire won by 2 runs |
| Scorecard | Hampshire; 220 (49.4 overs) | v | (H) Kent; 218 (49.3 overs) | Nevill Ground, Tunbridge Wells; Umpires: RK Illingworth and P Willey |
| Scorecard | AD Mascarenhas 50 (56); Yasir Arafat 3/48 (8.4 overs) | | MJ Walker 83 (118); SR Clark 3/42 (8 overs) | Nevill Ground, Tunbridge Wells; Umpires: RK Illingworth and P Willey |
| Kent won the toss and elected to field; Points: Kent 0, Hampshire 2 | | | | Nevill Ground, Tunbridge Wells; Umpires: RK Illingworth and P Willey |

| 13 June | Gloucestershire; 275/6 (50 overs) | v | (H) Kent; 235 (46.2 overs) | Gloucestershire won by 40 runs |
| Scorecard | Gloucestershire; 275/6 (50 overs) | v | (H) Kent; 235 (46.2 overs) | Nevill Ground, Tunbridge Wells; Umpires: NA Mallender and G Sharp |
| Scorecard | HJH Marshall 63 (76); SJ Cook 2/43 (10 overs) | | AJ Hall 55 (65); ID Fisher 3/45 (10 overs) | Nevill Ground, Tunbridge Wells; Umpires: NA Mallender and G Sharp |
| Gloucestershire won the toss and elected to bat; Points: Kent 0, Gloucestershire 2 | | | | Nevill Ground, Tunbridge Wells; Umpires: NA Mallender and G Sharp |

== NatWest Pro40 ==
=== Division Two ===
| Team | P | W | L | T | NR | NRR | Pts |
|---|---|---|---|---|---|---|---|
| 1. Durham Dynamos | 8 | 6 | 2 | 0 | 0 | +1.311 | 12 |
| 2. Somerset Sabres | 8 | 5 | 2 | 0 | 1 | +0.690 | 11 |
| 3. Middlesex Crusaders | 8 | 5 | 3 | 0 | 0 | +0.482 | 10 |
| 4. Surrey Brown Caps | 8 | 5 | 3 | 0 | 0 | +0.400 | 10 |
| 5. Kent Spitfires | 8 | 5 | 3 | 0 | 0 | +0.263 | 10 |
| 6. Yorkshire Phoenix | 8 | 4 | 3 | 0 | 1 | −0.229 | 9 |
| 7. Leicestershire Foxes | 8 | 3 | 4 | 0 | 1 | −0.393 | 7 |
| 8. Derbyshire Phantoms | 8 | 1 | 7 | 0 | 0 | −1.040 | 2 |
| 9. Glamorgan Dragons | 8 | 0 | 7 | 0 | 1 | −2.378 | 1 |

=== Matches ===
| 14 July | Leicestershire (H); 175 (39.5 overs) | v | Kent; 179/4 (33.3 overs) | Kent won by 6 wickets (with 39 balls remaining) |
| Scorecard | Leicestershire (H); 175 (39.5 overs) | v | Kent; 179/4 (33.3 overs) | Grace Road, Leicester; Umpires: AA Jones and P Willey; Player of the match: DI Stevens (Kent) |
| Scorecard | PA Nixon 61 (82); SJ Cook 3/36 (8 overs) | | RWT Key 63 (90); Mansoor Amjad 2/34 (7 overs) | Grace Road, Leicester; Umpires: AA Jones and P Willey; Player of the match: DI Stevens (Kent) |
| Leicestershire won the toss and elected to bat; Points: Leicestershire 0, Kent 2 | | | | Grace Road, Leicester; Umpires: AA Jones and P Willey; Player of the match: DI Stevens (Kent) |

| 29 July | Kent; 282/3 (40 overs) | v | (H) Derbyshire; 272/9 (40 overs) | Kent won by 10 runs |
| Scorecard | Kent; 282/3 (40 overs) | v | (H) Derbyshire; 272/9 (40 overs) | County Ground, Derby; Umpires: IJ Gould and JW Holder |
| Scorecard | RWT Key 104 (100); MG Dighton 2/46 (8 overs) | | GM Smith 88 (68); SJ Cook 3/53 (8 overs) | County Ground, Derby; Umpires: IJ Gould and JW Holder |
| Kent won the toss and elected to bat; Points: Derbyshire 0, Kent 2 | | | | County Ground, Derby; Umpires: IJ Gould and JW Holder |

| 12 August | Durham; 203 (39.4 overs) | v | (H) Kent; 204/7 (38.5 overs) | Kent won by 3 wickets (with 7 balls remaining) |
| Scorecard | Durham; 203 (39.4 overs) | v | (H) Kent; 204/7 (38.5 overs) | St Lawrence Ground, Canterbury; Umpires: NGB Cook and RK Illingworth |
| Scorecard | MJ Di Venuto 57 (72); DI Stevens 3/15 (5 overs) | | DI Stevens 85* (59); GR Breese 3/31 (8 overs) | St Lawrence Ground, Canterbury; Umpires: NGB Cook and RK Illingworth |
| Durham won the toss and elected to bat; Points: Kent 2, Durham 0 | | | | St Lawrence Ground, Canterbury; Umpires: NGB Cook and RK Illingworth |

| 26 August | Middlesex (H); 187/5 (40 overs) | v | Kent; 151 (36.4 overs) | Middlesex won by 36 runs |
| Scorecard | Middlesex (H); 187/5 (40 overs) | v | Kent; 151 (36.4 overs) | Lord's, St John's Wood, London; Umpires: GI Burgess and JF Steele |
| Scorecard | NRD Compton 48* (68); MJ Saggers 2/9 (8 overs) | | RWT Key 72 (105); TJ Murtagh 4/21 (7 overs) | Lord's, St John's Wood, London; Umpires: GI Burgess and JF Steele |
| Kent won the toss and elected to field; Points: Middlesex 2, Kent 0 | | | | Lord's, St John's Wood, London; Umpires: GI Burgess and JF Steele |

| 27 August | Somerset; 214/8 (40 overs) | v | (H) Kent; 212/7 (40 overs) | Somerset won by 2 runs |
| Scorecard | Somerset; 214/8 (40 overs) | v | (H) Kent; 212/7 (40 overs) | St Lawrence Ground, Canterbury; Umpires: B Leadbeater and RT Robinson |
| Scorecard | JL Langer 92 (105); R McLaren 4/46 (8 overs) | | R McLaren 78* (72); PD Trego 5/44 (8 overs) | St Lawrence Ground, Canterbury; Umpires: B Leadbeater and RT Robinson |
| Kent won the toss and elected to field; Points: Kent 0, Somerset 2 | | | | St Lawrence Ground, Canterbury; Umpires: B Leadbeater and RT Robinson |

| 4 September | Kent (H); 159/8 (40 overs) | v | Surrey; 160/9 (40 overs) | Surrey won by 1 wicket (with 0 balls remaining) |
| Scorecard | Kent (H); 159/8 (40 overs) | v | Surrey; 160/9 (40 overs) | St Lawrence Ground, Canterbury; Umpires: RJ Bailey and RA Kettleborough; Player of the match: SA Newman (Surrey) |
| Scorecard | M van Jaarsveld 40 (55); RJ Hamilton-Brown 3/36 (8 overs) | | SA Newman 92* (132); NJ Dexter 3/27 (7 overs) | St Lawrence Ground, Canterbury; Umpires: RJ Bailey and RA Kettleborough; Player of the match: SA Newman (Surrey) |
| Kent won the toss and elected to bat; Points: Kent 0, Surrey 2 AJ Blake made his List A debut | | | | St Lawrence Ground, Canterbury; Umpires: RJ Bailey and RA Kettleborough; Player of the match: SA Newman (Surrey) |

| | 178/8 (40 overs) | v | 179/2 (29.5 overs) | Kent won by 8 wickets (with 61 balls remaining) |
| Scorecard | 178/8 (40 overs) | v | 179/2 (29.5 overs) | Sophia Gardens, Cardiff; Umpires: JH Evans and JF Steele; Player of the match: RWT Key (Kent) |
| Scorecard | GP Rees 46 (75); MJ Saggers 4/25 (8 overs) | | RWT Key 107* (91); HT Waters 1/35 (8 overs) | Sophia Gardens, Cardiff; Umpires: JH Evans and JF Steele; Player of the match: RWT Key (Kent) |
| Glamorgan won the toss and elected to bat; Points: Glamorgan 0, Kent 2 | | | | Sophia Gardens, Cardiff; Umpires: JH Evans and JF Steele; Player of the match: RWT Key (Kent) |

| 9 September | Kent (H); 228/9 (40 overs) | v | Yorkshire; 215/7 (40 overs) | Kent won by 13 runs |
| Scorecard | Kent (H); 228/9 (40 overs) | v | Yorkshire; 215/7 (40 overs) | St Lawrence Ground, Canterbury; Umpires: GI Burgess and JH Evans |
| Scorecard | M van Jaarsveld 50 (48); RM Pyrah 3/50 (7 overs) | | JA Rudolph 86 (107); MJ Saggers 3/21 (8 overs) | St Lawrence Ground, Canterbury; Umpires: GI Burgess and JH Evans |
| Yorkshire won the toss and elected to field; Points: Kent 2, Yorkshire 0 | | | | St Lawrence Ground, Canterbury; Umpires: GI Burgess and JH Evans |

== Other List A match ==
=== Tour match ===
| 16 July | Sri Lanka A 259/8 (50 overs) | v | (H) Kent; 7/0 (4 overs) | No result |
| Scorecard | Sri Lanka A 259/8 (50 overs) | v | (H) Kent; 7/0 (4 overs) | St Lawrence Ground, Canterbury; Umpires: JW Lloyds and DJ Millns |
| Scorecard | ML Udawatte 67 (87); M van Jaarsveld 3/43 (10 overs) | | NJ Dexter 6* (15) | St Lawrence Ground, Canterbury; Umpires: JW Lloyds and DJ Millns |
| Sri Lanka A won the toss and elected to bat; Rain stopped play after 4 overs of Kent's innings; PG Dixey, JE Goodman, JA Iles, SA Northeast and TW Parsons made their List A debuts | | | | St Lawrence Ground, Canterbury; Umpires: JW Lloyds and DJ Millns |

== Twenty20 Cup ==
=== South Division ===
| Pos | Team | Pld | W | L | T | NR | Pts | NRR |
|---|---|---|---|---|---|---|---|---|
| 1 | Sussex Sharks | 8 | 5 | 2 | 0 | 1 | 11 | +0.179 |
| 2 | Kent Spitfires | 8 | 4 | 2 | 1 | 1 | 10 | +0.324 |
| 3 | Surrey Brown Caps | 8 | 4 | 4 | 0 | 0 | 8 | +0.809 |
| 4 | Essex Eagles | 8 | 3 | 4 | 0 | 1 | 7 | -0.365 |
| 5 | Middlesex Crusaders | 8 | 2 | 3 | 0 | 3 | 7 | -0.204 |
| 6 | Hampshire Hawks | 8 | 1 | 4 | 1 | 2 | 5 | -1.116 |

=== Matches ===
| 22 June | Kent; 153/6 (20 overs) | v | (H) Hampshire; 153/7 (20 overs) | Match tied |
| Scorecard | Kent; 153/6 (20 overs) | v | (H) Hampshire; 153/7 (20 overs) | Rose Bowl, Southampton; Umpires: IJ Gould and MJ Harris; Player of the match: AD Mascarenhas (Hampshire) |
| Scorecard | RWT Key 59 (53); AD Mascarenhas 3/17 (4 overs) | | CC Benham 45 (41); SJ Cook 3/30 (4 overs) | Rose Bowl, Southampton; Umpires: IJ Gould and MJ Harris; Player of the match: AD Mascarenhas (Hampshire) |
| Kent won the toss and elected to bat; Points: Hampshire 1, Kent 1 | | | | Rose Bowl, Southampton; Umpires: IJ Gould and MJ Harris; Player of the match: AD Mascarenhas (Hampshire) |

| 23 June | Kent (H); 44/1 (5.1 overs) | v | Essex; 46/6 (5 overs) | Kent won by 3 runs (D/L method) |
| Scorecard | Kent (H); 44/1 (5.1 overs) | v | Essex; 46/6 (5 overs) | St Lawrence Ground, Canterbury; Umpires: B Dudleston and NA Mallender |
| Scorecard | RWT Key 21* (15); AP Palladino 1/12 (2 overs) | | GW Flower 20 (11); R McLaren 2/3 (1 over) | St Lawrence Ground, Canterbury; Umpires: B Dudleston and NA Mallender |
| Kent won the toss and elected to bat; Rain stopped the Kent inning after 5.1 overs, and Essex were set a D/L) target of 50 to win from 5 overs; Points: Kent 2, Essex 0 | | | | St Lawrence Ground, Canterbury; Umpires: B Dudleston and NA Mallender |

| 26 June | Kent (H); 181/3 (20 overs) | v | Sussex; 182/3 (17.1 overs) | Sussex won by 7 wickets (with 17 balls remaining) |
| Scorecard | Kent (H); 181/3 (20 overs) | v | Sussex; 182/3 (17.1 overs) | St Lawrence Ground, Canterbury; Umpires: VA Holder and JW Lloyds; Player of the match: LJ Wright (Sussex) |
| Scorecard | RWT Key 62 (46); OP Rayner 1/20 (2 overs) | | LJ Wright 103 (45); JC Tredwell 1/20 (3 overs) | St Lawrence Ground, Canterbury; Umpires: VA Holder and JW Lloyds; Player of the match: LJ Wright (Sussex) |
| Kent won the toss and elected to bat; Points: Kent 0, Sussex 2 | | | | St Lawrence Ground, Canterbury; Umpires: VA Holder and JW Lloyds; Player of the match: LJ Wright (Sussex) |

| 27 June | Middlesex (H); 146/7 (20 overs) | v | Kent | No result |
| Scorecard | Middlesex (H); 146/7 (20 overs) | v | Kent | Uxbridge Cricket Club Ground, Uxbridge; Umpires: JW Holder and JW Lloyds |
| Scorecard | ET Smith 66 (50); SJ Cook 3/28 (4 overs) | | | Uxbridge Cricket Club Ground, Uxbridge; Umpires: JW Holder and JW Lloyds |
| Middlesex won the toss and elected to bat; Rain stopped play before the start of Kent's innings; Points: Middlesex 1, Kent 1 | | | | Uxbridge Cricket Club Ground, Uxbridge; Umpires: JW Holder and JW Lloyds |

| 29 June | Kent; 141/7 | v | (H) Essex; 99 (14.5 overs) | Kent won by 42 runs |
| Scorecard | Kent; 141/7 | v | (H) Essex; 99 (14.5 overs) | County Ground, Chelmsford; Umpires: JW Holder and VA Holder; Player of the match: DI Stevens (Kent) |
| Scorecard | NJ Dexter 31* (18); GR Napier 2/21 (4 overs) | | RS Bopara 27 (15); DI Stevens 4/14 (3 overs) | County Ground, Chelmsford; Umpires: JW Holder and VA Holder; Player of the match: DI Stevens (Kent) |
| Essex won the toss and elected to field; Points: Essex 0, Kent 2 | | | | County Ground, Chelmsford; Umpires: JW Holder and VA Holder; Player of the match: DI Stevens (Kent) |

| 2 July | Kent (H); 131/8 (20 overs) | v | Surrey; 132/2 (17.4 overs) | Surrey won by 6 wickets (with 14 balls remaining) |
| Scorecard | Kent (H); 131/8 (20 overs) | v | Surrey; 132/2 (17.4 overs) | County Ground, Beckenham; Umpires: NL Bainton and NGC Cowley; Player of the match: Azhar Mahmood (Surrey) |
| Scorecard | DI Stevens 27 (28); CP Schofield 3/18 (4 overs) | | Azhar Mahmood 39* (19); SJ Cook 2/28 (4 overs) | County Ground, Beckenham; Umpires: NL Bainton and NGC Cowley; Player of the match: Azhar Mahmood (Surrey) |
| Surrey won the toss and elected to field; Points: Kent 0, Surrey 2 | | | | County Ground, Beckenham; Umpires: NL Bainton and NGC Cowley; Player of the match: Azhar Mahmood (Surrey) |

| 4 July | Kent (H); 146/4 (20 overs) | v | Middlesex; 120 (18.4 overs) | Kent won by 26 runs |
| Scorecard | Kent (H); 146/4 (20 overs) | v | Middlesex; 120 (18.4 overs) | County Ground, Beckenham; Umpires: R Palmer and P Willey; Player of the match: M Morkel (Kent) |
| Scorecard | JL Denly 40 (33); JWM Dalrymple 2/28 (4 overs) | | EJG Morgan 34 (27); M Morkel 3/24 (4 overs) | County Ground, Beckenham; Umpires: R Palmer and P Willey; Player of the match: M Morkel (Kent) |
| Middlesex won the toss and elected to field; Points: Kent 2, Middlesex 0 | | | | County Ground, Beckenham; Umpires: R Palmer and P Willey; Player of the match: M Morkel (Kent) |

| 6 July | Surrey (H); 145 (19.5 overs) | v | Kent; 148/4 (19.1 overs) | Kent won by 6 wickets (with 5 balls remaining) |
| Scorecard | Surrey (H); 145 (19.5 overs) | v | Kent; 148/4 (19.1 overs) | The Oval, Kennington, London; Umpires: NL Bainton and JH Evans; Player of the match: DI Stevens (Kent) |
| Scorecard | MR Ramprakash 33 (24); SJ Cook 3/21 (4 overs) | | DI Stevens 46* (34); CP Schofield 2/23 (4 overs) | The Oval, Kennington, London; Umpires: NL Bainton and JH Evans; Player of the match: DI Stevens (Kent) |
| Surrey won the toss and elected to bat; Points: Surrey 0, Kent 2 | | | | The Oval, Kennington, London; Umpires: NL Bainton and JH Evans; Player of the match: DI Stevens (Kent) |

=== Quarter-finals ===
| 17–18 July | Nottinghamshire (H); 138/9 (20 overs) | v | Kent; 139/1 (19.5 overs) | Kent won by 9 wickets (with 1 ball remaining) |
| Scorecard | Nottinghamshire (H); 138/9 (20 overs) | v | Kent; 139/1 (19.5 overs) | Trent Bridge, Nottingham; Umpires: RA Kettleborough and P Willey; Player of the match: JL Denly (Kent) |
| Scorecard | SP Fleming 49 (28); JC Tredwell 2/19 (4 overs) | | JL Denly 63* (61); GP Swann 1/23 (4 overs) | Trent Bridge, Nottingham; Umpires: RA Kettleborough and P Willey; Player of the match: JL Denly (Kent) |
| Nottinghamshire won the toss and elected to bat; Reserve day was used due to rain; Kent advanced to the semi-finals | | | | Trent Bridge, Nottingham; Umpires: RA Kettleborough and P Willey; Player of the match: JL Denly (Kent) |

=== Semi-finals ===
| 4 August | Sussex; 140 (19.4 overs) | v | Kent; 141/5 (19.2 overs) | Kent won by 5 wickets (with 4 balls remaining) |
| Scorecard | Sussex; 140 (19.4 overs) | v | Kent; 141/5 (19.2 overs) | Edgbaston, Birmingham; Umpires: NJ Llong and NA Mallender; Player of the match: RWT Key (Kent) |
| Scorecard | MW Goodwin 38 (35); SL Malinga 3/30 (3.4 overs) | | RWT Key 68* (54); MH Yardy 1/9 (2 overs) | Edgbaston, Birmingham; Umpires: NJ Llong and NA Mallender; Player of the match: RWT Key (Kent) |
| Sussex won the toss and elected to bat; Kent advanced to the final | | | | Edgbaston, Birmingham; Umpires: NJ Llong and NA Mallender; Player of the match: RWT Key (Kent) |

=== Final ===
| 4 August | Gloucestershire; 146/8 (20 overs) | v | Kent; 147/6 (19.3 overs) | Kent won by 4 wickets (with 3 balls remaining) |
| Scorecard | Gloucestershire; 146/8 (20 overs) | v | Kent; 147/6 (19.3 overs) | Edgbaston, Birmingham; Umpires: NA Mallender and P Willey; Player of the match: R McLaren (Kent) |
| Scorecard | HJH Marshall 65 (49); R McLaren 3/22 (4 overs) | | MJ Walker 45 (35); MA Hardinges 2/24 (4 overs) | Edgbaston, Birmingham; Umpires: NA Mallender and P Willey; Player of the match: R McLaren (Kent) |
| Kent won the toss and elected to field; Kent won the 2007 Twenty20 Cup R McLaren took a hat-trick | | | | Edgbaston, Birmingham; Umpires: NA Mallender and P Willey; Player of the match: R McLaren (Kent) |

== UCCE match ==
Kent's 3-day match against Cardiff UCCE in April did not have first-class status.

| 25–27 April | Kent | v | Cardiff UCCE | Kent won by an innings and 10 runs |
| Scorecard | 443/6d (95 overs); NJ Dexter 116 (181); MJ Wood 2/80 (16 overs) | | 171 (71.5 overs); DM Rushbrook 28 (86); RH Joseph 3/28 (15 overs) | St Lawrence Ground, Canterbury; Umpires: DJ Millns and G Sharp |
| Scorecard | | | 262 (90 overs) (f/o); RI Kaufman 95 (127); R McLaren 6/59 (20 overs) | St Lawrence Ground, Canterbury; Umpires: DJ Millns and G Sharp |
Kent won the toss and elected to bat; Match did not have first-class status
