= List of English Twenty20 cricket champions =

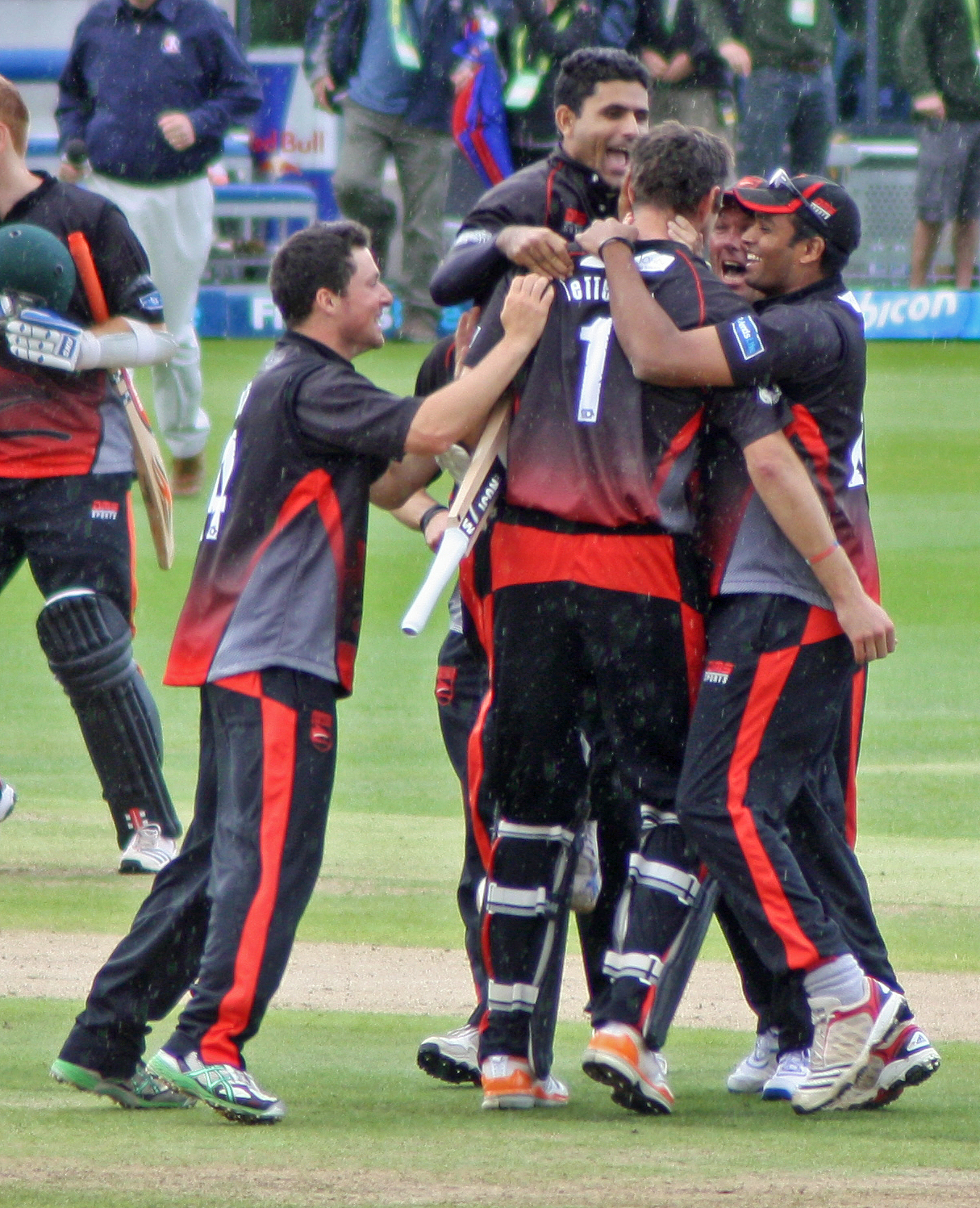
Leicestershire (pictured celebrating their semi-final win in 2011) have won the joint-most English Twenty 20 titles, winning on three occasions.

The English Twenty20 cricket champions are the winners of the England and Wales Cricket Board (ECB) Twenty20 competition for first-class cricket counties, most recently the Friends Life t20, although from 2014 this has been replaced with the NatWest t20 Blast. The competition culminates with 'Finals Day': a single day on which both semi-finals and the final are contested at the same ground. Northamptonshire are the current champions, claiming their third title in the 2026 season.

Twenty20 cricket was developed by the ECB to attract new, younger audiences to cricket. Replacing the 50 overs-per-side 'Benson & Hedges Cup', the 'Twenty20 Cup' was introduced in 2003, and was over two hours shorter than its predecessor, and matches also featured greater entertainment off the field, such as live music, barbecues, fancy dress and karaoke. The competition was rebranded as the 'Friends Provident t20' in 2010, and a season later as the 'Friends Life t20'. In 2014, the competition became known as the NatWest t20 Blast. For the first seven years of the competition, teams were allowed one overseas player, as in the other domestic tournaments, but from the 2010 season, each team was allowed two. The finalists in both 2009 and 2011 qualified for the Champions League Twenty20, an international competition between the leading domestic teams from the major cricketing nations.

The competition was won in its inaugural season by Surrey, and in the twenty-three seasons that it has run, it has been won by fourteen different counties. Leicestershire, Hampshire, Somerset and Northamptonshire have won the competition on the most occasions, doing so three times. Somerset have contested more finals than any other team; as well as winning the competition in 2005, 2023 and 2025, they were losing finalists in 2009, 2010, 2011, 2021 and 2024.

== Men's champions ==
List of English men's Twenty20 cricket champions
Year	Winner	Runners-up	Venue of final	Leading run-scorer		Leading wicket-taker		Notes
Year	Winner	Runners-up	Venue of final	Player (club)	Runs	Player (club)	Wickets	Notes
2003	Surrey	Warwickshire	Trent Bridge, Nottinghamshire	(Australia) Brad Hodge (Leicestershire)	301	(England) Adam Hollioake (Surrey)	16	
2004	Leicestershire	Surrey	Edgbaston, Warwickshire	(England) Darren Maddy (Leicestershire)	356	(England) Adam Hollioake (Surrey)	20	
2005	Somerset	Lancashire	The Oval, London	(England) Owais Shah (Middlesex)	410	(England) Nayan Doshi (Surrey)	17	
2006	Leicestershire	Nottinghamshire	Trent Bridge, Nottinghamshire	(Australia) Justin Langer (Somerset)	464	(England) Nayan Doshi (Surrey)	21	
2007	Kent	Gloucestershire	Edgbaston, Warwickshire	(England) Luke Wright (Sussex)	346	(England) Chris Schofield (Surrey), (England) Simon Cook (Kent)	17	
2008	Middlesex	Kent	The Rose Bowl, Hampshire	(England) Joe Denly (Kent)	451	(Pakistan) Yasir Arafat (Kent)	23	
2009	Sussex	Somerset	Edgbaston, Warwickshire	(England) Jonathan Trott (Warwickshire)	525	(South Africa) Alfonso Thomas (Somerset)	18	
2010	Hampshire	Somerset	The Rose Bowl, Hampshire	(England) Jimmy Adams (Hampshire)	668	(South Africa) Alfonso Thomas (Somerset)	33	
2011	Leicestershire	Somerset	Edgbaston, Warwickshire	(Australia) Andrew McDonald (Leicestershire)	584	(England) Tim Phillips (Essex)	26	
2012	Hampshire	Yorkshire	Sophia Gardens, Glamorgan	(Australia) Phillip Hughes (Worcestershire)	402	(Australia) Mitchell Starc (Yorkshire)	21	
2013	Northamptonshire	Surrey	Edgbaston, Warwickshire	(England) Craig Kieswetter (Somerset)	517	(Pakistan) Azharullah (Northamptonshire)	27	
2014	Birmingham Bears (Note: From 2014–2025, Warwickshire's Twenty20 team was known as the Birmingham Bears.)	Lancashire	Edgbaston, Warwickshire	(England) Jason Roy (Surrey)	677	(New Zealand) Jeetan Patel (Birmingham Bears)	25	
2015	Lancashire	Northamptonshire	Edgbaston, Warwickshire	(England) James Vince (Hampshire)	710	(Australia) James Faulkner (Lancashire)	25	
2016	Northamptonshire	Durham	Edgbaston, Warwickshire	(Australia) Michael Klinger (Gloucestershire)	548	(England) Benny Howell (Gloucestershire)	24	
2017	Nottinghamshire	Warwickshire	Edgbaston, Warwickshire	(England) Joe Denly (Kent)	567	(Australia) Clint McKay (Leicestershire)	23	
2018	Worcestershire	Sussex	Edgbaston, Warwickshire	(England) Laurie Evans (Sussex)	614	(England) Pat Brown (Worcestershire)	31	
2019	Essex	Worcestershire	Edgbaston, Warwickshire	(Pakistan) Babar Azam (Somerset)	578	(Cricket West Indies) Ravi Rampaul (Derbyshire)	23	
2020	Nottinghamshire	Surrey	Edgbaston, Warwickshire	(England) Daniel Bell-Drummond (Kent)	423	(England) Jake Ball (Nottinghamshire)	19	
2021	Kent	Somerset	Edgbaston, Warwickshire	(Australia) Josh Inglis (Leicestershire)	531	(Afghanistan) Naveen-ul-Haq (Leicestershire)	26	
2022	Hampshire	Lancashire	Edgbaston, Warwickshire	(England) James Vince (Hampshire)	678	(England) Richard Gleeson (Lancashire)	25	
2023	Somerset	Essex	Edgbaston, Warwickshire	(England) James Vince (Hampshire)	670	(New Zealand) Matt Henry (Somerset)	31	
2024	Gloucestershire	Somerset	Edgbaston, Warwickshire	(Australia) Daniel Hughes (Sussex)	596	(England) David Payne (Gloucestershire)	33	
2025	Somerset	Hampshire	Edgbaston, Warwickshire	(England) Toby Albert (Hampshire)	633	(Australia) Riley Meredith (Somerset)	28	
2026	Northamptonshire	Hampshire	Edgbaston, Warwickshire	(England) Joe Weatherley (Hampshire)	591	(Pakistan) Hasan Ali (Yorkshire)	27	

== Performance by county (Men's) ==
Titles won by club (%)
1. Leicestershire – 3 (12.5%)
2. Hampshire – 3 (12.5%)
3. Somerset - 3 (12.5%)
4. Northamptonshire - 3 (12.5%)
5. Kent – 2 (8.30%)
6. Nottinghamshire - 2 (8.30%)
7. Others – 8 (33.3%)

Titles	Club	Title-winning seasons
3	Leicestershire	2004, 2006, 2011
3	Hampshire	2010, 2012, 2022
3	Somerset	2005, 2023, 2025
3	Northamptonshire	2013, 2016, 2026
2	Kent	2007, 2021
2	Nottinghamshire	2017, 2020
1	Essex	2019
1	Gloucestershire	2024
1	Lancashire	2015
1	Middlesex	2008
1	Surrey	2003
1	Sussex	2009
1	Birmingham Bears	2014
1	Worcestershire	2018

== Women's champions ==
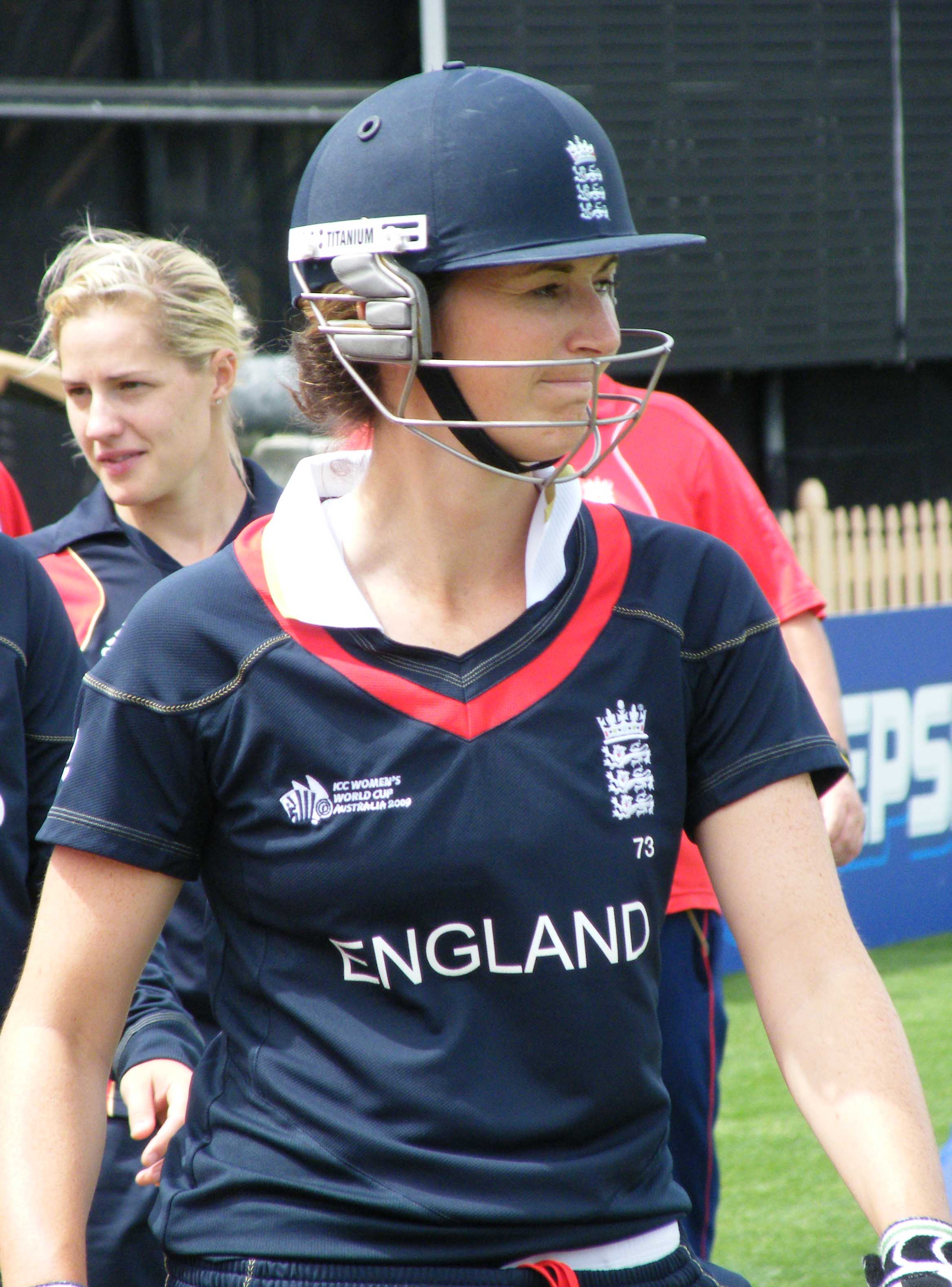
Former England captain Charlotte Edwards led the Southern Vipers to the inaugural WCSL title in 2016

List of English Women's Twenty20 cricket champions
Year	Winner	Runners-up	Venue of final	Leading run-scorer		Leading wicket-taker		Notes
Year	Winner	Runners-up	Venue of final	Player (club)	Runs	Player (club)	Wickets	Notes
2016	Southern Vipers	Western Storm	County Cricket Ground, Chelmsford	(Jamaica) Stafanie Taylor (Western Storm)	289	(Jamaica) Stafanie Taylor (Western Storm)	11	
2017	Western Storm	Southern Vipers	County Cricket Ground, Hove	(New Zealand) Rachel Priest (Western Storm)	261	(England) Nat Sciver (Surrey Stars)	12	
2018	Surrey Stars	Loughborough Lightning	County Cricket Ground, Hove	(India) Smriti Mandhana (Western Storm)	421	(Scotland) Kirstie Gordon (Loughborough Lightning)	17	
2019	Western Storm	Southern Vipers	County Cricket Ground, Hove	(England) Danielle Wyatt (Southern Vipers)	466	(England) Freya Davies (Western Storm)	19	
2021	South East Stars	Northern Diamonds	Rose Bowl, Southampton	(England) Evelyn Jones (Central Sparks)	276	(England) Bryony Smith (South East Stars)	14	
2022	Southern Vipers	Central Sparks	County Ground, Northampton	(England) Amy Jones (Central Sparks)	289	(England) Katie Levick (Northern Diamonds)	15	
2023	Southern Vipers	The Blaze	New Road, Worcester	(England) Danni Wyatt (Southern Vipers)	273	(South Africa) Nadine de Klerk (The Blaze)	15	
2024	The Blaze	South East Stars	County Ground, Derby	(Scotland) Kathryn Bryce (The Blaze)	478	(England) Kirstie Gordon (The Blaze)	22	
2025	Surrey	Birmingham Bears	The Oval, London	(New Zealand) Suzie Bates (Durham)	439	(England) Millie Taylor (Birmingham Bears)	22	
2026	The Blaze	Durham	The Oval, London	(England) Grace Scrivens (Essex)	428	(Australia) Charli Knott (The Blaze)	27	

== Performance by team (Women's) ==
Titles won by club (%)
1. Southern Vipers – 3 (30.0%)
2. Western Storm – 2 (20.0%)
3. The Blaze – 2 (20.0%)
4. Surrey Stars – 1 (10.0%)
5. South East Stars – 1 (10.0%)
6. Surrey – 1 (10.0%)

Titles	Club	Title-winning seasons
3	Southern Vipers	2016, 2022, 2023
2	Western Storm	2017, 2019
2	The Blaze	2024, 2026
1	Surrey Stars	2018
1	South East Stars	2021
1	Surrey	2025
