= List of Kent County Cricket Club List A cricket records =

This is a list of Kent County Cricket Club List A cricket records; that is, record team and individual performances in List A cricket for Kent County Cricket Club. List A cricket is a limited overs form of cricket usually played over one day.

Kent played their first List A match in the 1963 domestic season against Sussex in the 1963 Gillette Cup at the Nevill Ground, Tunbridge Wells. The county have competed in List A competitions in every season since 1963 and, as of February 2018, have played just over 1,000 List A matches, including against representative and touring international teams. In January and February 2017 they competed in the 2016–17 Regional Super50, the List A competition of the West Indies domestic season. This was the first time that any English county had competed in an overseas domestic competition. Kent competed again in the competition in 2018.

The county have won 11 domestic List A competitions, most recently the 2022 Royal London One-Day Cup. Long serving spin bowler Derek Underwood holds the record for most List A appearances for Kent with 377 matches played for the county between 1963 and 1987.

== Team records ==
All records last updated 30 September 2024

- Highest total for: 384/6 vs Berkshire at Finchampstead, 1994 (60 over match) and 384/8 vs Surrey at Beckenham, 2018 (50 over match)
- Highest total against: 405/4 by Durham at Beckenham, 2021 (50 over match)
- Lowest total for: 60 all out vs Somerset at Taunton, 1979
- Lowest total against: 60 all out by Derbyshire at Canterbury, 2008

=== Highest partnerships ===
The highest partnership for Kent was 241 runs for the 2nd wicket between Trevor Ward and Aravinda de Silva made against Surrey at Canterbury in 1995 in a 40 over match.

Highest partnership for each wicket
Partnership	Runs	Players		Opposition	Venue	Season
1st wicket	229	Trevor Ward	Mark Benson	v Surrey	St Lawrence Ground, Canterbury	1995
2nd wicket	241	Trevor Ward	Aravinda de Silva	v Surrey	St Lawrence Ground, Canterbury	1995
3rd wicket	208	Carl Hooper	Alan Wells	v Durham	St Lawrence Ground, Canterbury	1998
4th wicket	216*	Martin van Jaarsveld	Darren Stevens	v Surrey	St Lawrence Ground, Canterbury	2008
5th wicket	219	Ben Compton	Joey Evison	v Yorkshire	North Marine Road Ground, Scarborough	2023
6th wicket	226	Nigel Llong	Matthew Fleming	v Cheshire	South Downs Road Cricket Ground, Bowdon	1999
7th wicket	91	Charlie Stobo	Grant Stewart	v Worcestershire	New Road, Worcester	2024
8th wicket	174	Rob Key	James Tredwell	v Surrey	The Oval, London	2007
9th wicket	81	John Shepherd	Derek Underwood	v Middlesex	Lord's, London	1975
10th wicket	64	Matt Coles	Matt Hunn	v Surrey	The Oval, London	2015

== Individual batting records ==
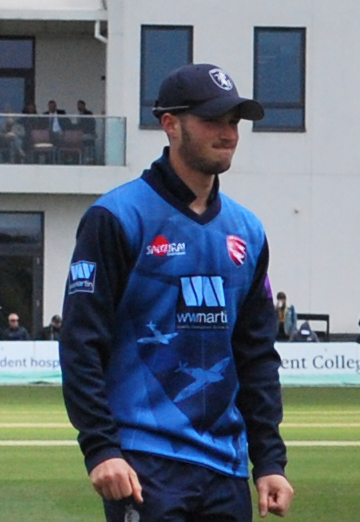
Ollie Robinson scored Kent's highest List A individual score in 2022

Over 100 players have scored a century for Kent in List A cricket since the county began competing in this form of cricket in 1963. The first century for Kent was made by Colin Cowdrey against Suffolk in the 1966 Gillette Cup. Chris Tavaré, Rob Key, Martin van Jaarsveld and Joe Denly have all scored eight centuries in their Kent careers.

The highest individual score for Kent is 206 not out made by Ollie Robinson in the 2022 Royal London One-Day Cup against Worcestershire in August 2022 at New Road, Worcester. This is the only double century to be scored by a Kent player in List A matches and surpassed the previous highest score of 150 not out made by Joe Denly in the 2018 Royal London One-Day Cup against Glamorgan in May 2018 at Canterbury. Denly in turn had surpassed the innings of 147 made by Darren Stevens in the previous year's competition and Andrew Symonds' score of 146 in the 2004 National League.

- Highest individual score: 206 not out, Ollie Robinson vs Worcestershire at Worcester, 2022 (50 over match)
- Most runs in a season: 1,073, Trevor Ward, 1995
- Most career runs: 7,814, Mark Benson, 1980–1995

== Individual bowling records ==
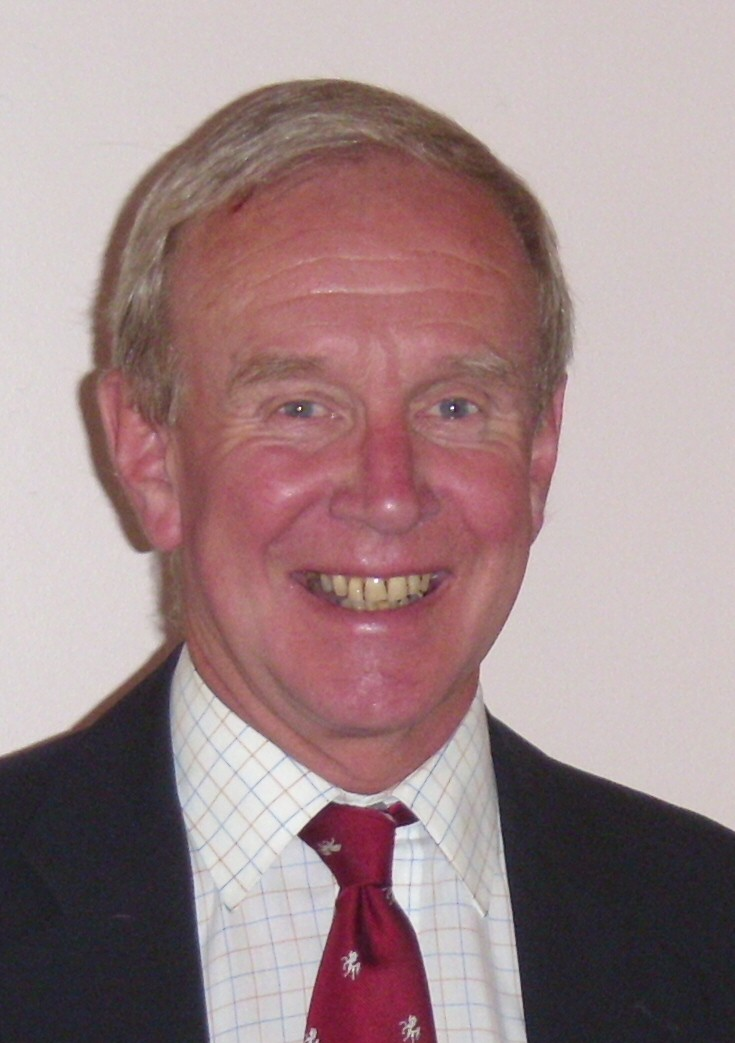
Derek Underwood, who played for the county between 1963 and 1987, is Kent's leading wicket-taker in List A cricket

Long serving spin bowler Derek Underwood dominates Kent bowling records in List A cricket, leading the county in wickets taken and, with 530 wickets, is the only player with more than 400 wickets for Kent. Underwood also has the best bowling figures in Kent List A history, with Alan Dixon taking the second best figures for the county, and took five wickets in an innings eight times. Three players have taken hat-tricks for Kent in List A cricket, Richard Ellison, Martin McCague and, most recently in 2015, Matt Coles.

- Best bowling: 8/31 Derek Underwood vs Scotland at Myreside, Edinburgh, 1987
- Most wickets in a season: 49, Martin McCague, 1992
- Most career wickets: 530, Derek Underwood, 1963–1987

== See also ==
- List of Kent County Cricket Club first-class cricket records
- List of Kent County Cricket Club Twenty20 cricket records
