= James Iles =

English cricketer

Personal information
- Full name: James Alexander Iles
- Born: 11 February 1990 (age 36); Chatham, Kent
- Height: 6 ft 4 in (1.93 m)
- Batting: Right-handed
- Bowling: Right-arm medium-fast
- Role: Bowler

Domestic team information
- Years: Team
- 2006–2009: Kent
- Only First-class: 17 May 2006 Kent v Cambridge UCCE
- Only List A: 16 July 2007 Kent v Sri Lanka A

Career statistics
Competition	First-class	List A
Matches	1	1
Runs scored	–	–
Batting average	–	–
100s/50s	–	–
Top score	–	–
Balls bowled	78	36
Wickets	1	1
Bowling average	37.00	27.00
5 wickets in innings	0	0
10 wickets in match	0	0
Best bowling	1/27	1/27
Catches/stumpings	0/–	1/–
- Source: CricInfo, 18 November 2017

James Alexander Iles (born 11 February 1990) is a former English professional cricketer. He played twice for Kent County Cricket Club.

Born in Chatham, Medway and educated at Maidstone Grammar School, Iles signed for Kent as an academy scholar in 2005, having played age-group cricket for Kent since under-13 level. Despite only making two appearances for the academy team and none for the county's second eleven, he made his first-class cricket debut against Cambridge University in May 2006. Iles was 16 years and 95 days old on his debut and became Kent's youngest ever cricketer, beating Wally Hardinge's record which had stood since the 1902 season.

He made his List A cricket debut the following season in a match against the touring Sri Lanka A team. In the match, which was later abandoned due to rain, Iles bowled six overs taking the wicket of opening batsman Dilruwan Perera.

These were Iles' only First XI appearances for Kent, although he continued to play Second XI cricket into the 2008 season. He also played rugby, representing Kent for three years.
