= Adam Cook (cricketer) =

English cricketer

Personal information
- Full name: Adam Philip Cook
- Born: 13 November 1979 (age 46); Oxford, Oxfordshire, England
- Batting: Left-handed
- Bowling: Right-arm off break
- Relatives: Simon Cook (brother)

Domestic team information
- Years: Team
- 1998–2008: Oxfordshire

Career statistics
Competition	List A
Matches	7
Runs scored	131
Batting average	21.83
100s/50s	–/1
Top score	66
Balls bowled	168
Wickets	6
Bowling average	27.66
5 wickets in innings	–
10 wickets in match	–
Best bowling	3/40
Catches/stumpings	1/–
- Source: Cricinfo, 20 May 2011

Adam Philip Cook (born 13 November 1979) is a former English cricketer. Cook was a left-handed batsman who used to bowl right-arm off break. He was born in Oxford, Oxfordshire.

Cook made his debut for Oxfordshire in the 1998 Minor Counties Championship against Shropshire. Cook played Minor counties cricket for Oxfordshire from 1998 to 2008, which included 52 Minor Counties Championship matches and 24 MCCA Knockout Trophy matches. He made his List A debut against the Durham Cricket Board in the 1999 NatWest Trophy. He played 6 further List A matches, the last coming against Herefordshire in the 1st round of the 2004 Cheltenham & Gloucester Trophy which was held in 2003. In his 7 List A matches he scored 131 runs at a batting average of 21.83, with a high score of 66. This came against Herefordshire in the 2004 Cheltenham & Gloucester Trophy. With the ball he took 6 wickets at a bowling average of 27.66, with best figures of 3/40.

He has previously played for the Middlesex Second XI. His brother, Simon, played first-class cricket for Middlesex and Kent.
