= 2004 Totesport League =

- Administrator(s): England and Wales Cricket Board
- Cricket format: Limited overs cricket (45 overs per innings)
- Tournament format(s): League system
- Champions: Glamorgan Dragons (3rd title)
- Participants: 19
- Matches: 162
- Most runs: 807 Paul Weekes
- Most wickets: 39 Simon Cook

The 2004 totesport League season was a 45 over English county cricket competition; colloquially known as the Sunday League. Glamorgan Dragons won the League for the third time.

== Final standings ==
=== Division One ===
Team	P	W	L	T	NR	Pts
1. Glamorgan Dragons	16	11	5	0	0	44
2. Lancashire Lightning	16	9	6	0	1	38
3. Hampshire Hawks	16	7	6	0	3	34
4. Northamptonshire Steelbacks	16	8	8	0	0	32
5. Gloucestershire Gladiators	16	7	7	1	1	32
6. Essex Eagles	16	6	6	1	3	32
7. Warwickshire Bears	16	7	8	0	1	30
8. Kent Spitfires	16	5	9	0	2	24
9. Surrey Lions	16	4	9	0	3	22

= Champions
= Relegated

=== Division two ===
Team	P	W	L	T	NR	Pts
1. Middlesex Crusaders	18	12	6	0	0	48
2. Worcestershire Royals	18	11	5	0	2	48
3. Nottinghamshire Outlaws	18	9	4	1	4	46
4. Yorkshire Phoenix	18	10	6	0	2	40
5. Sussex Sharks	18	9	7	1	1	40
6. Durham Dynamos	18	9	7	0	2	40
7. Leicestershire Foxes	18	7	8	0	3	34
8. Somerset Sabres	18	6	11	0	1	26
9. Derbyshire Scorpions	18	5	12	0	1	22
10. Scotland Sapphires	18	2	14	0	2	12

= Promoted
