= Matthew Wood (cricketer, born 1985) =

English cricketer (born 1985)

Matthew Joseph Wood (born 14 January 1985 in Brighton) is an English former cricketer active in 2007 who played in one first-class match for Marylebone Cricket Club as a righthanded batsman who bowled left arm medium fast pace. He scored six runs and took two wickets.
