= Ryan McLaren =

South African cricketer

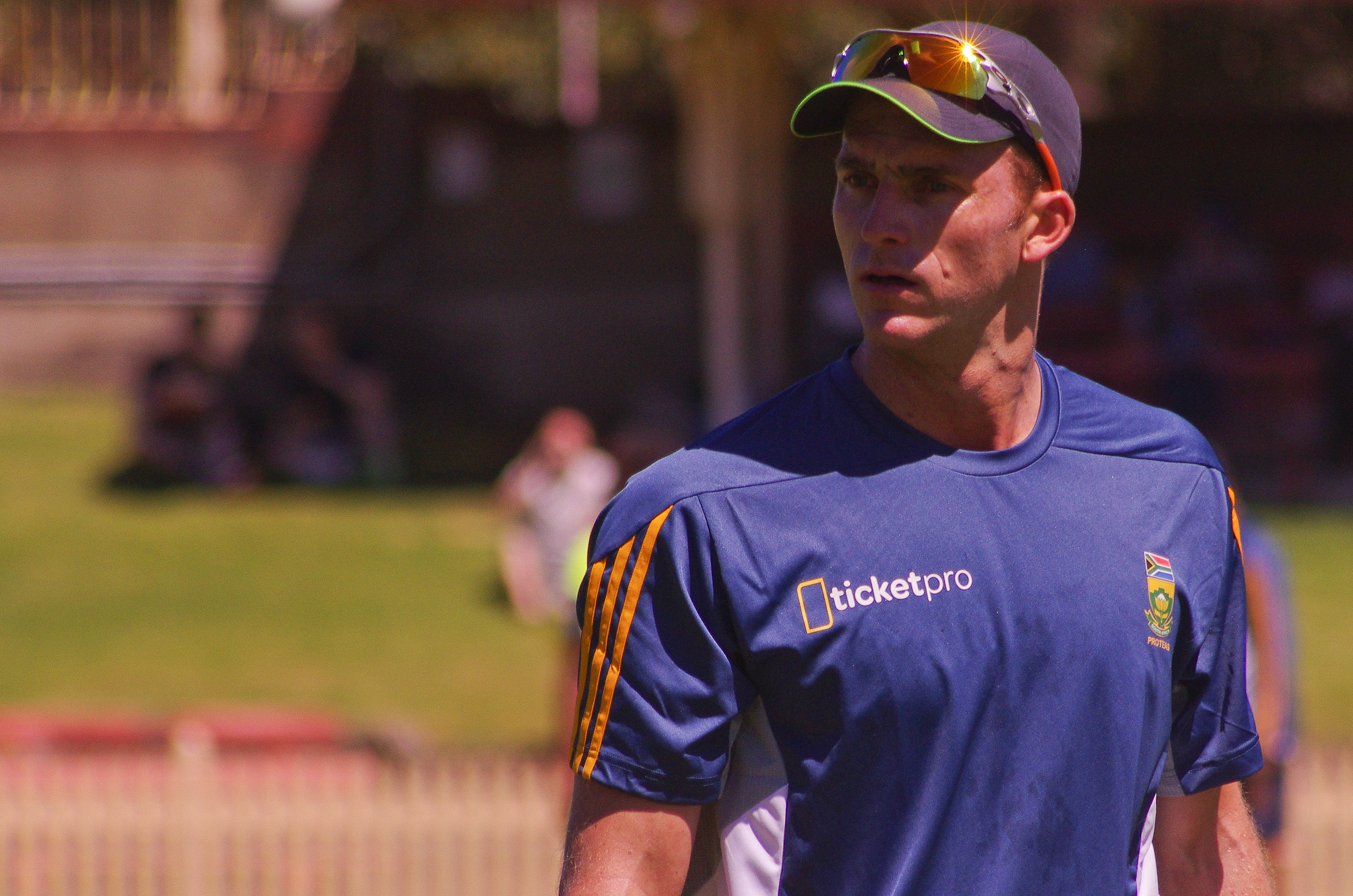

Personal information
- Full name: Ryan McLaren
- Born: 9 February 1983 (age 43); Kimberley, Cape Province, South Africa
- Height: 6 ft 4 in (1.93 m)
- Batting: Left-handed
- Bowling: Right-arm medium-fast
- Role: All-rounder

International information
- National side: South Africa (2009–2014)
- Test debut (cap 306): 14 January 2010 v England
- Last Test: 12 February 2014 v Australia
- ODI debut (cap 97): 8 November 2009 v Zimbabwe
- Last ODI: 23 November 2014 v Australia
- ODI shirt no.: 23

Domestic team information
- Years: Team
- 2003–2005: Free State
- 2004–2014: Knights
- 2007–2009: Kent
- 2010: Mumbai Indians
- 2011: Kings XI Punjab
- 2011: Middlesex
- 2013: Kolkata Knight Riders
- 2014–2016: Dolphins
- 2015–2016: Hampshire
- 2017: Lancashire
- 2017–2019: Knights

Career statistics
Competition	Test	ODI	FC	LA
Matches	2	54	154	210
Runs scored	47	485	6,298	3,453
Batting average	23.50	18.65	33.86	31.39
100s/50s	0/0	0/1	7/33	0/17
Top score	33*	71*	140	88
Balls bowled	264	2,403	24,685	8,649
Wickets	3	77	459	256
Bowling average	54.00	27.29	27.61	29.02
5 wickets in innings	0	0	15	2
10 wickets in match	0	0	1	0
Best bowling	2/72	4/19	8/38	5/38
Catches/stumpings	0/–	13/–	69/–	65/–
- Source: ESPNcricinfo, 3 April 2024

Ryan McLaren (born 9 February 1983) is a former South African professional cricketer, who played in all formats at international level. He is a left-handed batsman and a right-arm medium-fast bowler. McClaren signed a contract with English County side Lancashire for the 2017 season. In January 2019, McLaren announced his retirement from first-class cricket.

== Domestic career ==
McLaren made his first-class debut for Free State (now called Knights) in October 2003, taking two wickets and scoring 25 runs.

McLaren had also appeared eight times for South Africa Under-19's, during the 2001–02 Under-19 World Cup.

McLaren agreed to join Kent on a Kolpak deal for the 2007 season. In the 2007 Twenty20 Cup Final against Gloucestershire, McLaren took a hat-trick to help Kent win the Twenty20 Cup for the first time.

It was announced on 18 February 2010 that McLaren had signed to play for Middlesex in the 2011 Friends Provident Twenty20 Cup competition. In 2017 McClaren will play for English County side Lancashire as their overseas player.

In August 2017, McLaren was named in Stellenbosch Monarchs' squad for the first season of the T20 Global League. In October 2018, he was named in Nelson Mandela Bay Giants' squad for the first edition of the Mzansi Super League T20 tournament.

== International career ==
McLaren had been called up for the South African One-day side for the Kenya and Bangladesh series, but had to withdraw, because Kent did not release him from his Kolpak contract. After renouncing his Kolpak status, he was called up by South Africa to play against Zimbabwe and England in the 2009–10 season.

McLaren made his ODI debut against Zimbabwe at Benoni on 8 November 2009. He has single fifty in the format and took 77 wickets in 54 matches up to October 2015. His T20I debut also came on 2009, against England at Johannesburg. He took a T20I five-wicket haul against West Indies on 2010 as well on his third T20I. The feat was the first by a South African in T20Is.

Due to his good performance in shorter formats, he was called to the Test series against England on 14 January 2010. But his Test performance is not too good, where he played only 2 tests up to October 2015 and picked up only 3 wickets. Due to this poor performances, he was dropped from the squad.

== IPL ==
McLaren signed a contract with Mumbai Indians to play in the Indian Premier League T20. Although he did not feature in the 2009 edition, he played a bigger role in making his team reaching the finals. He also won man of the match against Royal Challengers Bangalore on 17 April; he scored 40 while opening with Sachin Tendulkar and took 1 for 21 with the ball.

After not being bought during the auction in 2011, McLaren was chosen by Kings XI Punjab as a replacement player after Stuart Broad and Dimitri Mascarenhas pulled out due to injury.

McLaren was bought in the 2013 Indian Premier League player auction by Kolkata Knight Riders for a sum of US$50,000.
