= 2003 Twenty20 Cup =

- Dates: 13 June 2003 – 19 July 2003
- Administrator: England and Wales Cricket Board
- Cricket format: Twenty20
- Tournament format(s): Group stage and knockout
- Champions: Surrey Lions (1st title)
- Participants: 18
- Matches: 48
- Most runs: Brad Hodge (301 for Leicestershire)
- Most wickets: Adam Hollioake (16 for Surrey)

The 2003 Twenty20 Cup was the inaugural edition of what would later become the T20 Blast, England's premier domestic Twenty20 competition. The tournament ran from 13 June to 19 July 2003. All 18 first-class counties took part. The finals day took place on 19 July at Trent Bridge, and was won by the Surrey Lions.

== Background ==
Following drops in attendances at county cricket matches, the England and Wales Cricket Board (ECB) first suggested playing a new reduced form of cricket in 1998. The first-class cricket counties and the Marylebone Cricket Club (MCC) did not approve the idea, which was then shelved. However, attendances continued to drop, and in 2001 the ECB brought the idea up once more, and invested £200,000 in market research. This research suggested that two-thirds of the population claimed to either hate cricket, or have no interest in it, and that cricket grounds had the intimidating feel of private members' clubs. Half of the study group indicated that they would be able to tolerate a shorter match played on weekday evenings. This research was taken back to the first-class counties and the MCC, and the formation of a new, short form of cricket was approved 11–7, with the MCC abstaining.

The format, in which team batted and bowled for 20 overs with a 15-minute break between innings, was decided upon, and the ECB then began marketing the concept with special offers and newspaper adverts. In addition to the shorter format, the competition also included off-field entertainment, including live bands, replay screens, barbecue zones and karaoke machines. Each of these were introduced to attract a wider range of spectators, particularly families and younger people.

== Format ==
The 18 first-class counties were split into three regional groups of six teams, which were retained from the Benson & Hedges Cup. The three group-winners and the best runner-up progressed straight to Finals Day on Saturday 19 July. Each team then played each other team in the group once, the 45 group matches took place over 12 days. On Finals Day, both semi-finals and the final were all played on the same day, with the first match starting at 10:45, and the final not due to finish until 22:00 that evening. In a break from tradition, the finals were not held at Lord's – who had their application for a concert licence turned down by Westminster City Council. Instead, the event was hosted by Nottinghamshire, at their Trent Bridge ground.

=== Rules and regulations ===
All standard laws of the game as laid down by the Marylebone Cricket Club applied with the following significant differences:

- Matches would begin at 5.30pm (Day/night matches at Hove and Chelmsford would begin at 7.30pm) and finish no later than 8.15pm (10.15pm for day/night matches).
- Each innings should last no longer than 75 minutes.
- Teams will incur a six-run penalty if they fail to bowl the full 20 overs within the 75 minutes.
- New batsmen must be in position within 90 seconds of a wicket falling.
- Only two fielders are allowed outside an inner circle during the first six overs of a team's innings.
- Bowlers are permitted a maximum of a fifth of the total overs in a completed innings (i.e. four overs if there is no delay or interruption caused by rain).
- Umpires can impose a five-run penalty for time-wasting by batsmen. They are expected to be ready as soon as the bowler is ready.
- No-balls will be penalised by a free-hit next ball with standard rules on no-ball dismissals applying.
- Each team must face a minimum of five overs for a match to be valid. The Duckworth-Lewis method will be used to calculate run targets in rain-affected games.

== Media coverage ==
Sky Sports broadcast eight group matches and the entirety of Finals Day live. Channel 4 broadcast one live group match, and showed highlights of the final. They also covered the event in their weekly sports programme. The BBC provided radio coverage of group matches via regional and local stations, and the Twenty20 final was given live coverage on BBC Radio 5 Live, while both semi-finals were covered on BBC Radio 5 Live Sports Extra.

== Fixtures and results ==
=== Group stage ===
==== Midlands/Wales/West Division ====
Pos	Team	Pld	W	L	T	NR	Pts
1	Gloucestershire Gladiators	5	5	0	0	0	10
2	Warwickshire Bears	5	4	1	0	0	8
3	Northamptonshire Steelbacks	5	2	3	0	0	4
4	Worcestershire Royals	5	2	3	0	0	4
5	Glamorgan Dragons	5	1	4	0	0	2
6	Somerset Sabres	5	1	4	0	0	2

==== North Division ====
Pos	Team	Pld	W	L	T	NR	Pts
1	Leicestershire Foxes	5	5	0	0	0	10
2	Derbyshire Scorpions	5	3	2	0	0	6
3	Yorkshire Phoenix	5	3	2	0	0	6
4	Lancashire Lightning	5	2	3	0	0	4
5	Nottinghamshire Outlaws	5	1	4	0	0	2
6	Durham Dynamos	5	1	4	0	0	2

==== South Division ====
The inaugural Twenty20 match was contested between Hampshire Hawks and Sussex Sharks at The Rose Bowl on 13 June 2003. The match attracted a sell-out crowd and was screened live on Sky Sports. Hampshire "came out of the blocks firing", according to Cricinfo's Vic Isaacs, scoring 66 runs in the opening 7 overs. A steady fall of wickets thereafter resulted in the Hawks scoring 153 all out. Hampshire's Wasim Akram and Alan Mullally then bowled economically, and despite a half-century by Sussex's Tim Ambrose, Hampshire won by 5 runs. In the division's other opening-night match, Surrey Lions' James Ormond took the first five-wicket haul in the Twenty20 Cup to help restrict Middlesex Crusaders to 155, which Surrey then passed with four balls remaining to secure the win.

Pos	Team	Pld	W	L	T	NR	Pts
1	Surrey Lions	5	5	0	0	0	10
2	Sussex Sharks	5	3	2	0	0	6
3	Kent Spitfires	5	2	3	0	0	4
4	Middlesex Crusaders	5	2	3	0	0	4
5	Essex Eagles	5	2	3	0	0	4
6	Hampshire Hawks	5	1	4	0	0	2

== Finals Day ==
=== Semi-finals ===
19 July 2003
Scorecard

Leicestershire Foxes; 162/7 (20 overs)	v	Warwickshire Bears; 166/3 (19.2 overs)
Brad Hodge 66 (50); Waqar Younis 3/21 (4 overs)		Trevor Penney 43 (30); Virender Sehwag 1/17 (4 overs)

Warwickshire won by 7 wickets
Trent Bridge, Nottingham
Umpires: John Holder and George Sharp
Player of the match: Brad Hodge (Leics)

19 July 2003
Scorecard

Surrey Lions; 147/9 (20 overs)	v	Gloucestershire Gladiators; 142/6 (20 overs)
Ian Ward 49 (48); Mark Hardinges 3/37 (4 overs)		Alex Gidman 61 (49); Azhar Mahmood 3/28 (4 overs)

Surrey won by 5 runs
Trent Bridge, Nottingham
Umpires: Barry Dudleston and George Sharp
Player of the match: Azhar Mahmood (Surrey)

=== Final ===
19 July 2003
Scorecard

Warwickshire Bears; 115 (18.1 overs)	v	Surrey Lions; 119/1 (10.5 overs)
Trevor Penney 33 (21); James Ormond 4/11 (4 overs)		Ali Brown 55* (34); Graham Wagg 1/20 (1 overs)

Surrey won by 9 wickets
Trent Bridge, Nottingham
Umpires: Barry Dudleston and John Holder
Player of the match: James Ormond (Surrey)

- This was the inaugural English domestic final to be played with coloured clothing and white balls.
- This was also the inaugural English domestic final to be played under floodlights.

== Players statistics ==
=== Batting averages (Top 10) ===
Player	Team	Matches	Innings	Runs	Average	Strike rate	Highest Score	100s	50s
Michael Hussey	Northamptonshire	5	5	279	69.75	122.36	88	0	3
Michael Di Venuto	Derbyshire	5	5	198	66.00	122.22	67	0	2
Ian Harvey	Gloucestershire	6	6	248	62.00	171.03	100*	1	1
Simon Katich	Hampshire	5	5	179	59.66	111.87	59*	0	2
Stephen Moore	Worcestershire	5	5	116	58.00	118.36	39*	0	0
Andy Flower	Essex	5	5	266	53.20	147.77	83	0	2
Brad Hodge	Leicestershire	6	6	301	50.16	138.07	97	0	3
Matthew Maynard	Glamorgan	5	5	242	48.40	151.25	72	0	3
Nick Knight	Warwickshire	7	7	275	45.83	130.33	89	0	3
Robin Martin-Jenkins	Sussex	5	5	133	44.33	134.34	56*	0	1
Qualification: 100 runs. Source: Cricinfo

=== Bowling averages (Top 10) ===
Player	Team	Matches	Overs	Wickets	Average	Economy	BBI	4wi	5wi
Virender Sehwag	Leicestershire	6	14.0	7	10.00	5.00	3/14	0	0
Jimmy Ormond	Surrey	5	20.0	11	10.09	5.55	5/26	1	1
Azhar Mahmood	Surrey	5	18.5	12	10.25	6.53	4/20	1	0
Dominic Hewson	Derbyshire	5	19.0	10	10.90	5.73	4/18	1	0
Jason Brown	Northamptonshire	5	17.5	11	11.09	6.84	5/27	0	1
Glen Chapple	Lancashire	5	19.0	9	11.22	5.31	2/13	0	0
Ashley Noffke	Middlesex	3	12.0	8	12.12	8.08	3/22	0	0
Peter Martin	Lancashire	4	15.0	7	12.14	5.66	3/20	0	0
Adam Hollioake	Surrey	7	25.1	16	12.31	7.82	5/21	1	1
Simon Cook	Middlesex	5	18.2	9	13.77	6.76	3/14	0	0
Qualification: 10 overs. Source: Cricinfo

== See also ==
- Twenty20 Cup
