= James Tredwell =

English cricketer (born 1982)

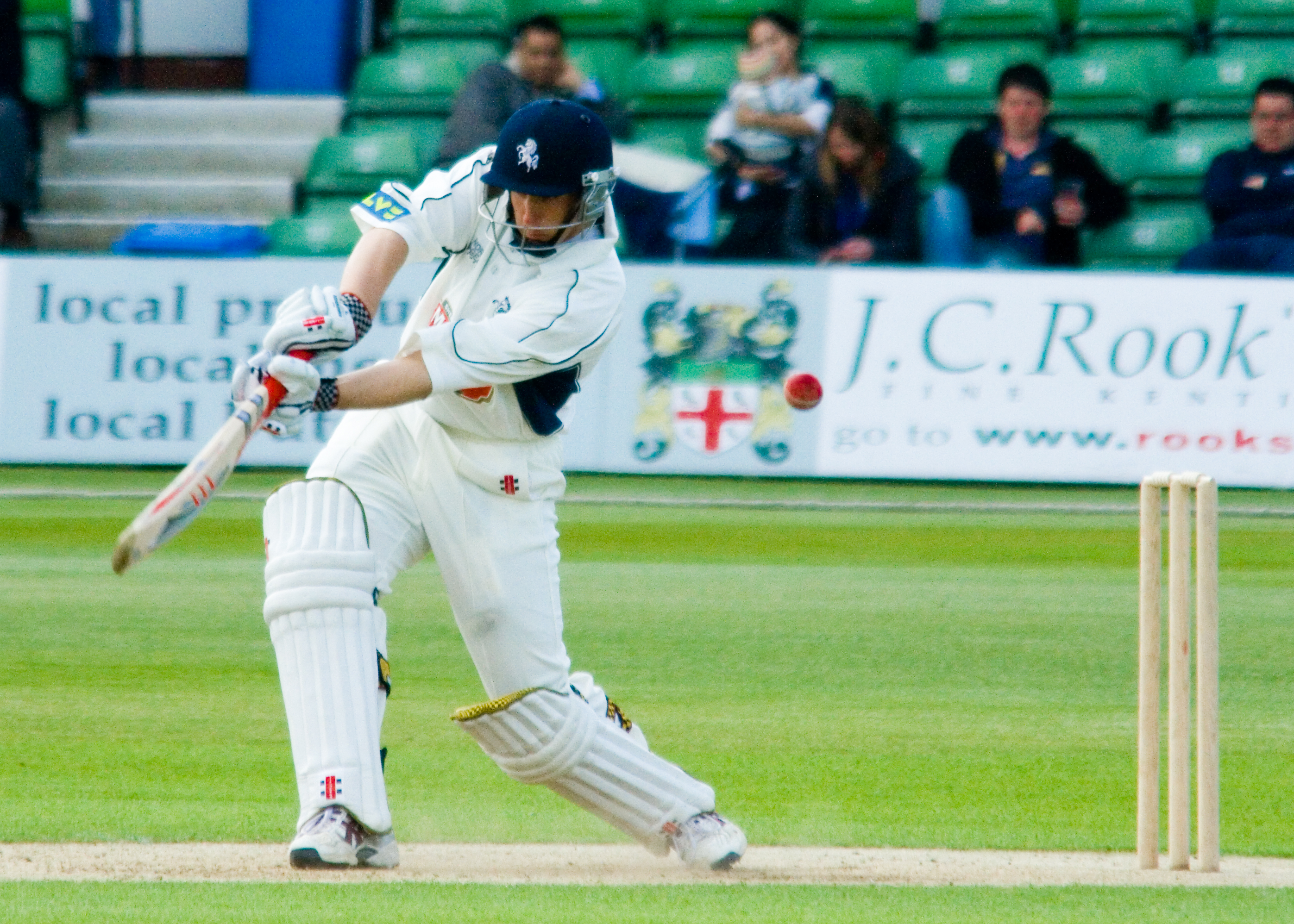
- Tredwell batting for Kent in 2008

Personal information
- Full name: James Cullum Tredwell
- Born: 27 February 1982 (age 44); Ashford, Kent, England
- Nickname: Pingu, Tredders
- Height: 5 ft 11 in (1.80 m)
- Batting: Left-handed
- Bowling: Right-arm off break
- Role: All-rounder

International information
- National side: England (2010–2015)
- Test debut (cap 648): 20 March 2010 v Bangladesh
- Last Test: 13 April 2015 v West Indies
- ODI debut (cap 215): 2 March 2010 v Bangladesh
- Last ODI: 13 March 2015 v Afghanistan
- ODI shirt no.: 53
- T20I debut (cap 62): 20 December 2012 v India
- Last T20I: 7 September 2014 v India

Domestic team information
- Years: Team
- 2001–2018: Kent (squad no. 15)
- 2014: → Sussex (on loan)

Career statistics
Competition	Test	ODI	FC	LA
Matches	2	45	177	270
Runs scored	45	163	4,728	1,917
Batting average	22.50	11.64	21.88	17.27
100s/50s	0/0	0/0	4/17	0/4
Top score	37	30	124	88
Balls bowled	786	2,104	30,574	11,606
Wickets	11	60	426	276
Bowling average	29.18	27.76	36.24	32.88
5 wickets in innings	0	0	12	1
10 wickets in match	0	0	3	0
Best bowling	4/47	4/44	8/66	6/27
Catches/stumpings	2/–	14/–	196/–	110/–
- Source: ESPNcricinfo, 16 February 2018

James Cullum Tredwell (born 27 February 1982) is an English former international cricketer. A left-handed batsman and a right-arm off break bowler, he played his domestic cricket for Kent County Cricket Club and was appointed as County Captain for the 2013 season. He made his debut for Kent in the 2001 season, nine days before his first appearance for England Under-19s. He often fielded at slip. Tredwell was a member of the England team that won the 2010 ICC World Twenty20.

He was part of the one-day set-up for Kent since 2002, but did not secure a regular place in the first-class County Championship team until 2007, a year after taking his maiden ten-wicket haul. He was selected as part of the England One Day International (ODI) squad to tour New Zealand in 2007–08, but had to wait until 2010 to make his international debut.

After impressing during the 2009 season with Kent, helping the team gain promotion back to the first division of the County Championship, Tredwell played his first Test and ODIs against Bangladesh in March 2010. His Twenty20 International debut followed two years later. He took 78 wickets in 74 international matches.

In September 2018, Tredwell announced his retirement from cricket having been injured for the entire 2018 domestic season after making five appearances in Kent's pre-season campaign in the West Indies 2017–18 Regional Super50 competition. In 2019 he was appointed to the ECB National Umpires Panel, qualifying him to stand as an umpire in Second XI and Minor Counties fixtures.

== Early career ==
Tredwell was born in Ashford, Kent and was educated at Southlands Community Comprehensive School in New Romney. His father, John, played over 1,000 times for Folkestone F.C. and coached his son at Folkestone Cricket Club. Tredwell has continued to play cricket for Folkestone in the Kent Cricket League.

He made three appearances in youth Test matches for England Under-19 cricket team against the West Indies in August 2001. He made his debut in the first Test at Grace Road, Leicester, alongside future Test cricketers James Anderson and Matt Prior. He claimed six wickets during the series, at an average of 32.50.

He was offered a contract with Kent County Cricket Club in 2001 after playing for the youth team. He was one of 14 players who were selected for the ECB National Academy in Loughborough in 2003–04, and the subsequent tours of Malaysia and India.

== County cricket ==
He made his first List A appearance for Kent Cricket Board against Worcestershire Cricket Board in the first round of the 2000 NatWest Trophy, when he was run out for ten and took one wicket. He also appeared in the subsequent two rounds of the competition, until Hampshire knocked them out in the third round. He spent the remainder of the 2000 season playing for Kent Second XI. He once again appeared in the first three rounds of the renamed 2001 Cheltenham & Gloucester Trophy, scoring 71 opening against Buckinghamshire in the second round, and 57 from the same position in the third round defeat to Warwickshire. His first-class debut for Kent came later in the same season, against Leicestershire in July 2001, claiming the wicket of Aftab Habib as his first scalp in a match that Kent won by three wickets at Grace Road.

His one-day debut for Kent County Cricket Club came in the 2002 Benson & Hedges Cup, where in a rain-reduced match, he claimed the wicket of Owais Shah as he finished with one wicket for 26 runs. He made 19 List A appearances for Kent in 2002, finishing the season with 21 wickets at an average of 23.76.

He played just two County Championship games in 2005, but played extensively in the one-day game, earning an extension to his contract. He became more involved with the Championship team in 2007, scoring his maiden first-class century (116*) against Yorkshire, and returning then career-best bowling figures of 6/47 against Surrey.

He was part of the team that won the 2007 Twenty20 Cup, beating Gloucestershire in the final.

At the end of the 2008 season, Kent were relegated from the first division of the County Championship, and they spent one season in the second division, achieving promotion at the end of the 2009 season by winning the second division title. During their promotion winning season, Tredwell took his career-best bowling figures, claiming 8/66 in a match against Glamorgan, a performance that gave him the leading bowling figures in the County Championship's second division. He finished the 2009 season with 69 first-class wickets at an average of 26.63; the first season in which he had taken more than 40 wickets or more than one five-wicket haul. He was also the second-highest wicket taker in the division behind leg-spinner Danish Kaneria (75).

Tredwell was named as captain of Kent for the 2013 season, replacing Rob Key. During his captaincy, Tredwell was called up to play for England in the Champions Trophy and then the one-day series against New Zealand and later against Australia. He found juggling both the Kent captaincy and his international commitments difficult and, as a result he resigned the captaincy to be replaced by the returning Key in November 2013.

In March 2016 Tredwell was selected to represent the Marylebone Cricket Club (MCC) in the Champion County match against Yorkshire in Abu Dhabi. He took six wickets in the match, bowling 65 overs in the match.

== International career ==
Tredwell's performances during the 2007 domestic season and with the Performance Squad in India over the winter of 2007–08, led to his first call-up to the England One Day International (ODI) squad in January 2008 for a series of matches against New Zealand. He did not play in any of the matches on the tour and was not called up again by England until December 2009 when a series of injuries in the England senior squad on tour in South Africa prompted his call-up to England's squad. Coach Andy Flower described him as a "like for like" replacement for Graeme Swann in case Swann's injury worsened. Once again he did not play a game as England won the ODI series 2–1.

Tredwell finally made his debut for England against Bangladesh in an ODI in March 2010, finishing with figures of 0/52 from 10 overs. He made his Test match debut in the second Test against Bangladesh, taking six wickets on debut as well as scoring 37 runs in England's first innings. Tredwell played his first match for England on home soil in the return series, taking 0/18 at Trent Bridge.

=== World Cup and Champions Trophy, 2011–2013 ===
After touring Australia in 2010–11, Tredwell played in two matches during England's 2011 World Cup campaign, winning the Player of the Match award in the teams' final group match against West Indies, with bowling figures of 4/48. The 2012 season saw him play in home matches against Australia and South Africa before touring India later in the year, making his Twenty20 International debut on the tour.

By the start of 2013 Tredwell had established himself as a key part of England's limited overs team and he played in all five matches against India, taking his best ODI figures of 4/44 during the tour. He played in all three T20I matches on England's tour of New Zealand. He went into the 2013 Champions Trophy as England's main spin bowler, playing in four of the team's five matches. He took 3/19 in the semi-final against South Africa and played in the rain-affected final against India, taking 1/25 as England narrowly lost by five runs.

More games followed: Tredwell played T20Is against New Zealand, captioning the team in one match which was rained off after two balls, and played ODIs against Ireland and four of the five ODIs against Australia later in the season before touring Australia over the 2013–14 northern winter and then being selected for the limited overs tour of the West Indies, in preparation for the T20 World Cup.

=== T20 World Cup, 2014 ===
After being selected again in England's squad for the T20 World Cup, Tredwell played in all four of England's group matches. The team failed to advance out of the group and was beaten by the Netherlands in their final match of the tournament.

Further international opportunities followed throughout 2014, with matches against Scotland, Sri Lanka and India at home before being selected for the tour of Sri Lanka later in the year, playing in 15 ODIs and nine T20Is during the year.

=== World Cup and final matches, 2015 ===
Despite being selected in the squad for a Tri-series tournament against India and Australia in early 2015, Tredwell did not play as Moeen Ali was chosen ahead of him as England's spin option. He was selected for the 2015 World Cup squad but only played in England's final game of the tournament against Afghanistan as the team again failed to advance out of the group stage. Tredwell took figures of 1/25 in what was his final ODI.

Tredwell's final international match came in April 2015. An injury to Moeen meant that he was chosen in the Test squad to tour the West Indies and was selected for the first Test of the series. He took 4/47 in the first innings of the match and one wicket in West Indies' second innings in what was his second and final Test appearance.

Sporting positions
Preceded by Rob Key	Kent County Cricket Club captain 2013	Succeeded by Rob Key
