= Chris Schofield =

English cricketer (born 1978)

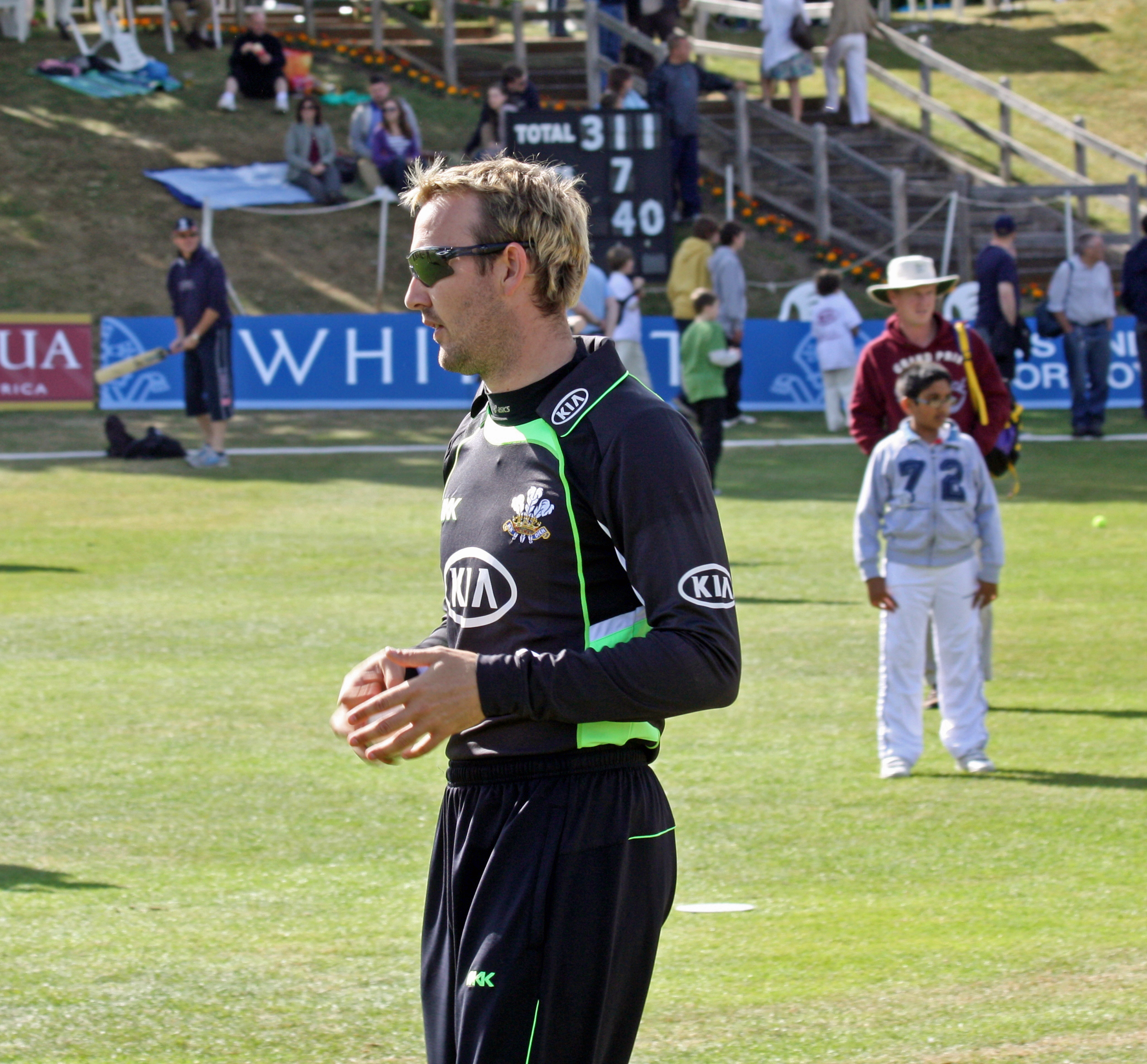

Personal information
- Full name: Christopher Paul Schofield
- Born: 6 October 1978 (age 48); Wardle, Rochdale, Greater Manchester, England
- Nickname: Schoey, Junior,
- Height: 6 ft 1 in (1.85 m)
- Batting: Left-handed
- Bowling: Right-arm leg break
- Role: Bowler

International information
- National side: England (2000–2007)
- Test debut (cap 601): 18 May 2000 v Zimbabwe
- Last Test: 5 June 2000 v Zimbabwe
- T20I debut (cap 31): 13 September 2007 v Zimbabwe
- Last T20I: 18 September 2007 v New Zealand
- T20I shirt no.: 28

Domestic team information
- Years: Team
- 1998–2004: Lancashire
- 2006–2011: Surrey

Career statistics
| Competition | Test | T20I | FC | LA |
|---|---|---|---|---|
| Matches | 2 | 4 | 103 | 150 |
| Runs scored | 67 | 24 | 3,823 | 2,040 |
| Batting average | 22.33 | 24.00 | 29.86 | 24.87 |
| 100s/50s | 0/1 | 0/0 | 1/27 | 0/9 |
| Top score | 57 | 9* | 144 | 75* |
| Balls bowled | 108 | 77 | 16,134 | 4,828 |
| Wickets | 0 | 4 | 237 | 158 |
| Bowling average | – | 23.00 | 36.40 | 26.89 |
| 5 wickets in innings | – | 0 | 6 | 2 |
| 10 wickets in match | – | 0 | 0 | 0 |
| Best bowling | – | 2/15 | 6/120 | 5/31 |
| Catches/stumpings | 0/– | 1/– | 57/– | 39/– |
- Source: CricketArchive, 12 August 2013

Christopher Paul Schofield (born 6 October 1978) is an English cricketer, who played Tests and Twenty20 Internationals. Schofield is one of the few leg-spinners to play cricket for England in the 21st century.

== Early career ==
Born on 6 October 1978, in Wardle, Rochdale, Greater Manchester, Schofield first came to prominence playing for the England Under-19 team, making his debut for them (as a batsman) at the age of 16 in April 1995. However, his career proper began in 1997, when he appeared on a number of further occasions for the Under-19s, and the following winter played for England in the Under-19s World Cup in South Africa which the team won. He finally made his first-class debut for Lancashire against Glamorgan in July 1998, although figures of 0–139 in the first innings were not the most impressive way to begin. (He claimed 2–44 in the second innings.)

1999 saw Schofield become an important member of the Lancashire team, and he played ten first-class games that season, finishing with 29 wickets at 32.79 including his first five-wicket haul: 5–66 against Durham. In 1999–2000 he had a useful tour to New Zealand and Bangladesh with England A, and his good form – combined with the England hierarchy's Warne-inspired thirst for a leg-spinner of their own – led to Schofield's being awarded one of the ECB's first batch of central contracts in 2000.

== International career ==
In May 2000, Schofield made his Test debut against Zimbabwe at Lord's. Despite a crushing England win by an innings and 209 runs, the game was a frustrating match for the leg-spinner as Zimbabwe's ineptitude against the seamers meant that he was not called upon to bowl a ball, and he was out third ball for nought in his only innings. The second Test at Nottingham was better in terms of runs – he made a handy 57 from number eight – but in 18 less than controlled overs he took 0–73.

In July 2007, he was picked in a preliminary 30-man squad for the Twenty20 World Cup in September, professing himself to have "worked very hard to get back into international colours". On 6 August 2007, Schofield was named in the full England squad for the 2007 Twenty20 World Championship.

== Later career ==
That was the end as far as Schofield's brief relationship with an England cap was concerned. He returned to his county, and though he was picked for another A tour to the West Indies in 2000–01 things started to fall apart shortly afterwards. In 2001 he took only 14 wickets at an average of over 54, though 26 wickets at 18.53 in List A cricket were a compensation, and although his average of 18.38 in 2002 looked better it was deceptive: Schofield was bowled only 122 first-class overs in total that summer.

The 2003 season continued Schofield's downward slide: 15 wickets at 42.40 in first-class cricket; five at 47.60 in List A games. This, though, was as nothing when set against his miserable 2004: a career-best knock of 99 against Warwickshire could not hide the fact that he was selected for only three County Championship matches, in which he took precisely one wicket in total; and though he played ten one-day games these were almost entirely as a batsman: he bowled only 36 List A balls in 2004.

At the end of the 2004 season, Lancashire released him, coach Mike Watkinson's understated remark that Schofield had "perhaps not reached his full potential" ringing in his ears. However, the player felt that he had been informed of the decision to dispense with his services too late in the year, and that this had affected his chance of finding a new employer for the following season. He brought a case for unfair dismissal against Lancashire to an employment tribunal, and in April 2005 the panel found in his favour.

Meanwhile, Schofield returned to play in club cricket, for Cheshire and Suffolk in the Minor Counties Championship, as well as having several games for the Durham, Sussex and Derbyshire second teams. In 2006 he played for Ormskirk Cricket Club in the Liverpool and District Cricket Competition's Premier League.

From late August 2006, he appeared for Surrey, though not (yet) under contract. In October 2006 he was offered a one-year contract for 2007 with Surrey and accepted the offer. He remained with Surrey until the end of the 2011 season, when he was released by the county after the club had gained promotion and won the Pro 40.
