= Joe Denly =

English cricketer (born 1986)

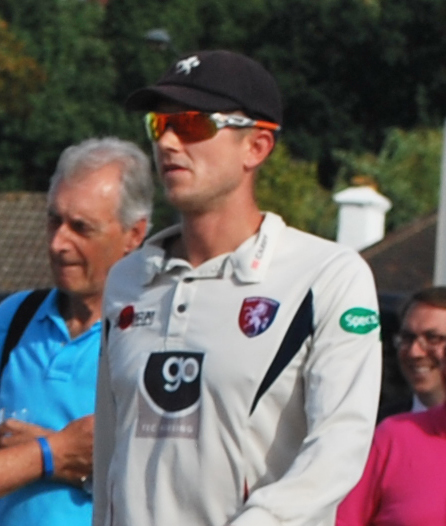
- Denly playing for Kent at Beckenham in 2016

Personal information
- Full name: Joseph Liam Denly
- Born: 16 March 1986 (age 40); Canterbury, Kent, England
- Height: 6 ft 0 in (1.83 m)
- Batting: Right-handed
- Bowling: Right-arm leg spin
- Role: Top-order batter
- Relatives: Jaydn Denly (nephew)

International information
- National side: England (2009–2020)
- Test debut (cap 690): 31 January 2019 v West Indies
- Last Test: 8 July 2020 v West Indies
- ODI debut (cap 209): 27 August 2009 v Ireland
- Last ODI: 9 February 2020 v South Africa
- T20I debut (cap 47): 30 August 2009 v Australia
- Last T20I: 8 September 2020 v Australia

Domestic team information
- Years: Team
- 2004–2011: Kent
- 2012–2014: Middlesex
- 2013: Barisal Burners
- 2014: Brothers Union
- 2015–2026: Kent (squad no. 6)
- 2017: Dhaka Dynamites
- 2017/18–2018/19: Sydney Sixers (squad no. 24)
- 2018: Karachi Kings (squad no. 6)
- 2019: Kolkata Knight Riders
- 2020/21: Brisbane Heat (squad no. 16)
- 2021: Lahore Qalandars
- 2022/23–2023/24: Sharjah Warriors

Career statistics
Competition	Test	ODI	FC	LA
Matches	15	16	251	171
Runs scored	827	446	14,228	5,281
Batting average	29.53	34.30	35.48	36.17
100s/50s	0/6	0/4	32/72	8/29
Top score	94	87	227	150*
Balls bowled	390	102	6,698	1,724
Wickets	2	1	83	57
Bowling average	109.50	101.00	44.57	26.00
5 wickets in innings	0	0	0	0
10 wickets in match	0	0	0	0
Best bowling	2/42	1/24	4/36	4/35
Catches/stumpings	7/–	7/–	96/–	59/–
- Source: ESPNcricinfo, 31 July 2026

Joseph Liam Denly (born 16 March 1986) is an English professional cricketer who played for Kent County Cricket Club. He was a right-handed batsman and occasional leg break bowler who plays as a top-order batsman. Denly played age-group cricket for Kent and began his professional career with the county before moving to Middlesex for three seasons between 2012 and 2014. He won the Professional Cricketers' Association Player of the Year award in 2018 and was named the season's Most Valuable Player.

Denly represented England in Test, One Day International (ODI) and Twenty20 International (T20I) matches. He played age-group cricket for England and made 14 one-day appearances for the international team in 2009 and 2010 before falling out of favour with national selectors. He was called back into the England Test and ODI squads in 2018 following two seasons of good performances for Kent, making his Test debut for England in January 2019.

== Early life ==
Denly was born in Canterbury in 1986 where he later attended Chaucer Technology School. Denly played football for Charlton Athletic's academy as a teenager and played for Whitstable Town under-18s, where he broke his arm in a match. Joe comes from a family of cricketers, with his brother Sam and father Nick both having played cricket for Whitstable Cricket Club in the Kent Cricket League.

== Domestic career ==
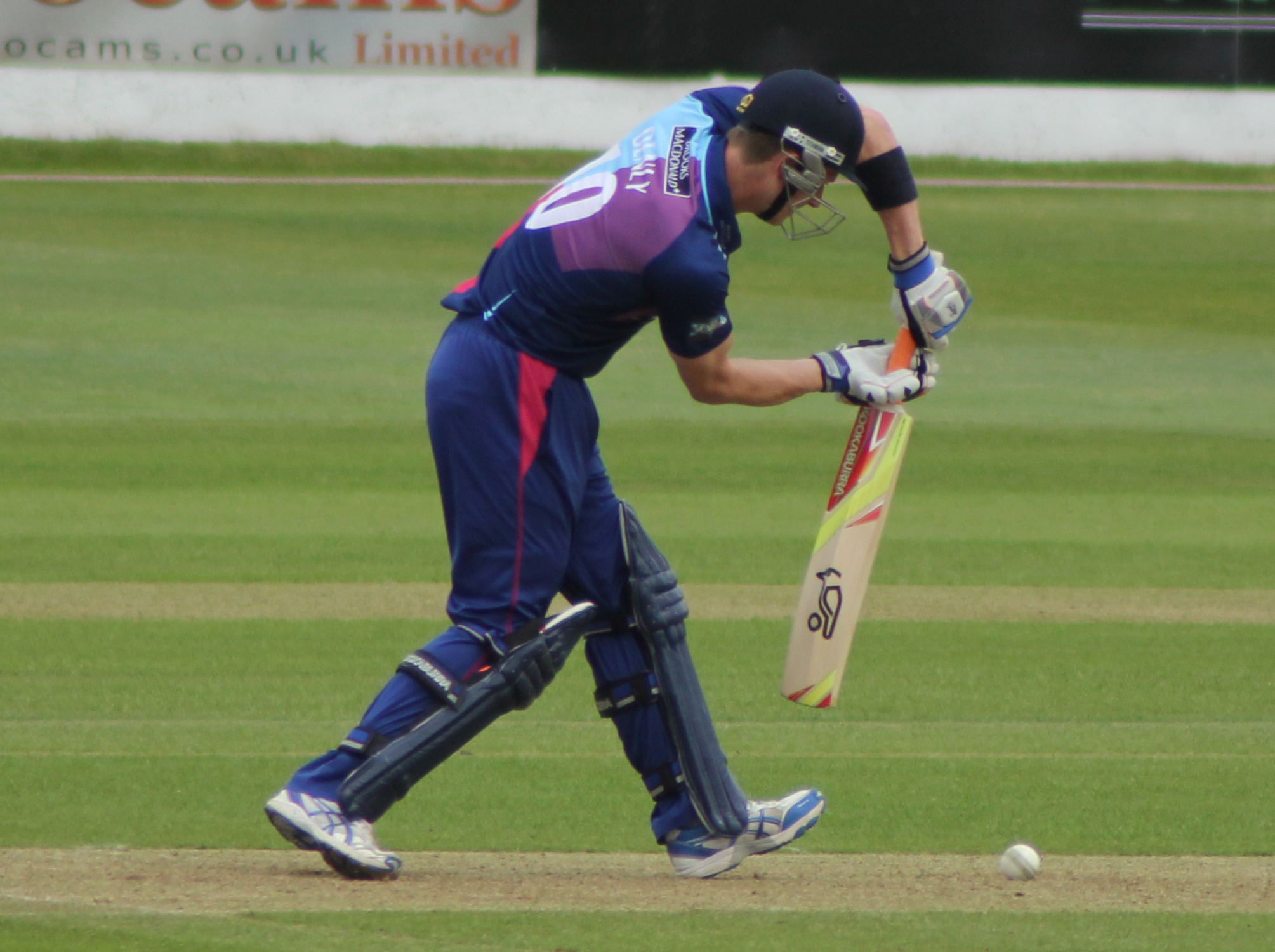
Denly batting for Middlesex in 2013

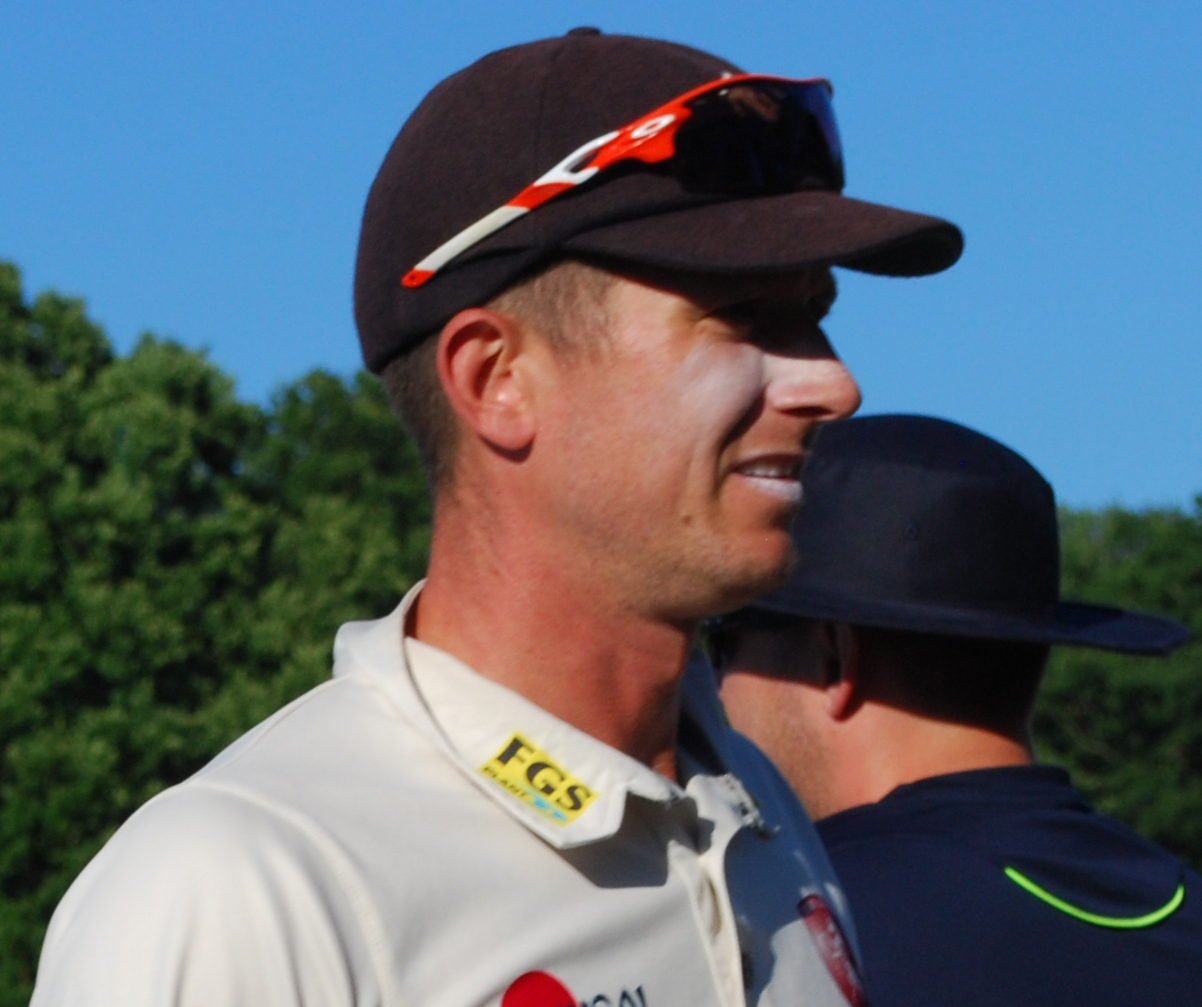
Denly at Tunbridge Wells, June 2018

Denly played for Kent County Cricket Club at every age level and was a member of the county's cricket academy. He made his first-class cricket debut for the county in 2004 at the age of 18 against Oxford University before playing his first County Championship match against Gloucestershire the following season. At the end of the 2005 season he was given an extension to his contract.

Denly scored his maiden professional century in 2007, carrying his bat for 115 not out of a Kent total of only 199 against Hampshire at Canterbury. In July, Denly was called up to the England Lions squad for the match against India and made 83 off 90 balls. In his first season, he brought up 1,000 first-class runs.

The 2008 season began slowly with a series of low scores. He did, however, make a career best score of 149 against Somerset at Tunbridge Wells and went on to end the season as one of the year's highly rated players.

Denly has spent several English off-seasons, starting in 2006–07, playing in Australia in the Sydney Grade Cricket competition for UTS Balmain (now known as Sydney Cricket Club), in part to improve his back foot play. He returned to the club for the 2016–17 season.

On 9 September 2011, Denly surpassed his previous high score of 149 and recorded a score of 199 against Derbyshire. On 28 September 2011, Denly moved from Kent to the newly promoted Middlesex. He returned to Kent in October 2014 after three seasons with Middlesex, ending his contract with Middlesex a year early to do so. His time at Middlesex was disappointing with him unable to perform consistently, scoring "just 1,829 Championship runs" in his time with the club and after averaging around 20 runs per innings in his final season with the club.

Denly improved his first-class high score in May 2016 when he scored 206 not out in the first innings of a match against Northamptonshire, his maiden first-class double century. He signed a long-term contract extension during August 2016, having made headlines earlier in the year when he retired not out in a County Championship match against Derbyshire at Derby when his wife went into labour unexpectedly early with the couple's first child. At the beginning of 2016, Denly gave up alcohol for a year to raise money for Cancer Research UK and the Professional Cricketers' Association benevolent fund, raising more than £4,000. After signing a contract extension in August 2016, Denly further improved his first-class high score on 21 May 2017 when he made 227 in the second innings of a Championship match against Worcestershire. His innings put Kent on course for victory, but Worcestershire successfully chased a target of 399 the following day.

The 2018 domestic season saw Denly lead the MVP rankings in the Royal London Cup and T20 Blast and win the overall MVP award. He signed a contract extension during the season and scored centuries in both one-day competitions, setting a new List A record highest score for Kent with a score of 150 against Glamorgan at Canterbury and, against Surrey at The Oval, became the first player in any form of T20 cricket to score a century and take a hat-trick in the same match. During the season he scored three Championship centuries and 1,729 runs and bowled far more frequently than in the past, taking 57 wickets in all formats of the game, including 23 in the County Championship at a bowling average of 18.5. At the end of the season he was voted Players' Player of the Year at the Professional Cricketers' Association awards, beating teammate Matt Henry and Surrey batsman Rory Burns and was called into the England squad for the first time since 2010.

Denly announced on 17 July 2026 that he would retire from cricket at the end of the 2026 season. On 31 July 2026, Denly played his final game for Kent against Somerset in the 2026 One-Day Cup.

== International career ==
Denly played for England age group teams from under-17 to under-19 levels, scoring three half-centuries in consecutive matches for the under-19s in India in 2005. He captained the ECB Development of Excellence team and first played for England Lions in 2007. He was called up to England's squad for the One Day International (ODI) series against Australia on 17 August 2009, and made his international debut in the ODI match against Ireland on 27 August 2009, opening the innings and top-scoring with 67. Denly made his international Twenty20 debut against Australia on 30 August 2009, though the result was a golden duck. The same result was achieved in his second Twenty20 against South Africa. He injured his knee in a football warmup ahead of a match against Australia in 2009 and missed the first three matches of the ODI series.

He toured Bangladesh with England in 2010 and played in the Champions Trophy team which reached the semi-finals in the same year. Denly was dropped from the England squad in the run-up to the 2010 World T20.

In September 2018 he was named in England's Test squad for the series against Sri Lanka in November. Following an injury to Liam Dawson, Denly was called into the England limited-overs squad during the tour of Sri Lanka, though he did not play in the ODI series. He made his return to international cricket in the single T20I match played on the tour, 3,102 days after his last international appearance. He scored 20 runs, opened the bowling and took four wickets on his return to the England team, winning the player of the match award. His figures of 4/19 were the second-best bowling figures by an England bowler in T20Is.

Despite not playing in any of the three Tests on the Sri Lankan tour, Denly was subsequently named in both the Test and one-day squads for England's tour of the West Indies in early 2019. He made his Test debut for England against the West Indies on 31 January.

In April 2019, he was named in England's provisional squad for the 2019 Cricket World Cup. The following month, Denly played in his first ODI match for ten years, in the one-off fixture against Ireland in Malahide. On 21 May 2019, England finalised their squad for the World Cup, with Denly not named in the final 15-man team. During the summer he played in all five Tests during the 2019 Ashes series, making half-centuries in the third and fourth Tests and scoring 94 in the final match of the series, his highest Test score. His ability to occupy the crease during the series later became known as a "Dentury". This was a tactical objective where he aimed to face at least 100 deliveries to tire out the opposition's opening bowlers. Although this was later criticised by Kevin Pietersen who argued management forced him into a defensive style that did not suit his natural game. Later in the year he was in the England party which toured New Zealand, although an ankle injury ruled him out of the Twenty20 element of the tour. He played in both Test matches, scoring 74 in the first match, before playing all four Tests on the tour of South Africa which followed.

In May 2020, Denly was named in a group of 55 players to begin training ahead of international fixtures during the COVID-19 pandemic. and in June was selected to be included in England's 30-man squad to start training behind closed doors for the Test series against the West Indies. He went on to play in the first Test of the series before being replaced for the second match after the return of England's captain Joe Root.

== Franchise cricket ==
After playing for Barisal Burners in the 2012–13 Bangladesh Premier League and returning to the country in 2014 to play for Brothers Union in domestic limited overs cricket, Denly was selected in 2017 by Dhaka Dynamites as an overseas player in the Bangladesh Premier League draft. He made his Dhaka debut in late November in the 2017–18 Bangladesh Premier League, scoring 44 runs on debut against Chittagong Vikings. He played in Dhaka's final six matches of the tournament as the team reached the final of the competition where they lost to Rangpur Riders.

In 2018, Denly joined the Sydney Sixers as a replacement for Jason Roy when he was selected by the national team in the 2017-18 Big Bash League season. He performed well in his four games, scoring 146 runs at an average of 73.00 with a top score of 72 not out. He was player of the match in the Sixers final match of the tournament against Melbourne Stars, making 72 runs from 45 balls and taking one wicket. After captaining Kent in the Caribbean Regional Super50 competition, Denly played 12 matches for Karachi Kings in the 2018 Pakistan Super League where he was the fourth highest run scorer in the competition with 323 runs.

In September 2018 Sydney Sixers announced that they had re-signed Denly for whole of the 2018–19 Big Bash, although following his selection for the England tour to the Caribbean he was only able to play for the team until early January. Later that year, Denly was bought by Kolkata Knight Riders in the 2019 IPL Auction.

In December 2020, Denly signed a contract to play for Brisbane Heat in the 2020–21 Big Bash. Due to quarantine restrictions in place because of the COVID-19 pandemic, he was available to play for the team from early January 2021.

== Career best performances ==
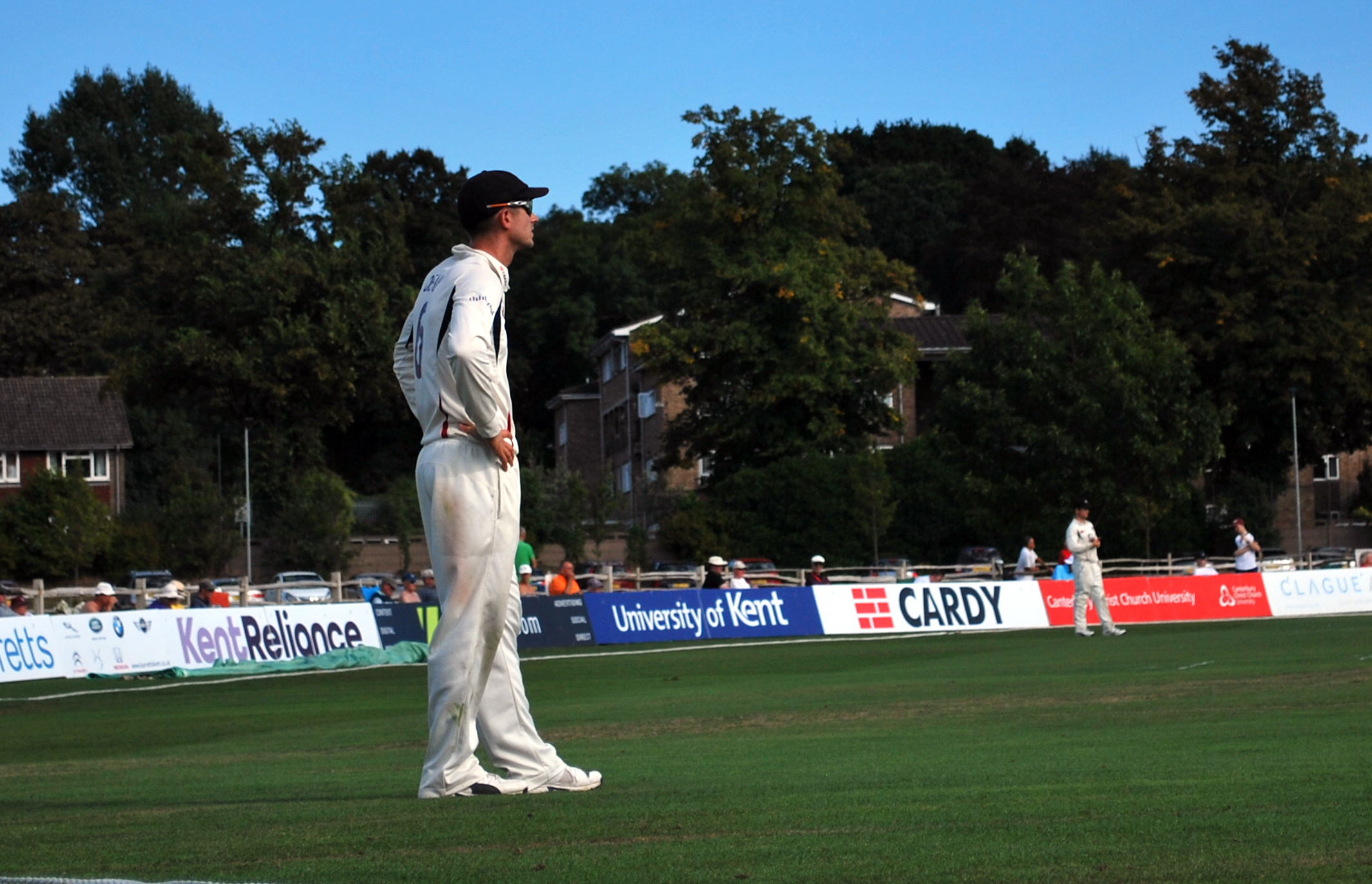
Denly, left, fielding for Kent at Beckenham in 2016

As of April 2024, Denly has scored 32 first-class centuries, including two double-centuries and a score of 199. His highest individual score of 227 runs was made in June 2017 against Worcestershire at New Road. Denly's first double-century was scored the previous season against Northants, surpassing his previous highest score of 199 made against Derbyshire in 2011. His maiden first-class century, a score of 115 not out, was made in his first full season as a professional in 2007 against Hampshire, an innings in which Denly carried his bat.

In July 2017 Denly, batting with Sean Dickson, made 182 runs in a second wicket partnership of 382 runs against Northants at Beckenham. This set a new Kent record for any partnership in first-class cricket, surpassing the previous record of 368 runs set in 1990.

He has made a further eight List A centuries and five in Twenty20 matches. He set the Kent record for the highest individual score in a Twenty20 match with a score of 116 not out made in July 2017 against Surrey at The Oval. During the same match he and Daniel Bell-Drummond set the record for any wicket partnership for the county, scoring 163 runs for the first wicket. He broke his own record in August 2017, scoring 127 against Essex at Chelmsford. Remarkably during the same match, Denly and Bell-Drummond again broke the county's record partnership for any wicket, this time adding 207 for the first wicket. This was also a world record opening partnership in Twenty20 cricket, and the third highest in the world for any wicket in the format. In May 2018 Denly went on to set the Kent record for the highest individual score in List A cricket, scoring 150 not out against Glamorgan at Canterbury.

Denly has been described as an "occasional" leg-spin bowler with a style of bowling which is best suited to limited-overs cricket – his approach has been described as "he stands tall and brings the ball down with plenty of over-spin to pitch near the batsman’s toes and go under flailing bats". His best bowling figures in first-class cricket of 4/36 were taken during the 2018 season against Derbyshire at Derby, the first time he had taken four wickets in a first-class innings. Earlier in the same season he had taken 3/24 against Warwickshire at Tunbridge Wells with the wickets taken in six balls at the end of Warwickshire's second innings to win the match for Kent. In June of the same season he took a hat-trick in Kent's opening T20 match of the season, having scored his fourth T20 century during Kent's innings. This was the first time in professional T20 cricket that a player had scored a century and taken a hat-trick in the same match. In October 2018 he took four wickets in a T20 match for the first time with figures of 4/19 on his return to the England team against Sri Lanka – at the time the second-best bowling figures by any England bowler in T20I matches and the best by a spin bowler.

As of 5 June 2022

	Batting				Bowling (innings)			
	Score	Fixture	Venue	Season	Analysis	Fixture	Venue	Season
First-class	227	Kent v Worcestershire	Worcester	2017	4/36	Kent v Derbyshire	Derby	2018
List A	150 not out	Kent v Glamorgan	Canterbury	2018	4/35	Kent v Jamaica	North Sound, Antigua	2017/18
T20	127	Kent v Essex	Chelmsford	2017	4/19	England v Sri Lanka	Colombo	2018/19
