= 2007 Twenty20 Cup =

- Dates: 22 June 2007 – 4 August 2007
- Administrator(s): England and Wales Cricket Board
- Cricket format: Twenty20
- Tournament format(s): Group stage and knockout
- Champions: Kent Spitfires (1st title)
- Participants: 18
- Matches: 79
- Attendance: 415,751 (5,263 per match)
- Most runs: Luke Wright (346 for Sussex Sharks)
- Most wickets: Chris Schofield (17 for Surrey Brown Caps); Simon Cook (17 for Kent Spitfires)

The 2007 Twenty20 Cup was the fifth edition of what would later become the T20 Blast tournament, England's premier domestic Twenty20 competition. It ran between 22 June and 4 August 2007, and saw the Kent Spitfires win the tournament for the first time, defeating Gloucestershire Gladiators in the final by 4 wickets. The first televised match of the year was between the defending champions Leicestershire Foxes and the Yorkshire Phoenix.

== Midlands/Wales/West Group ==
=== Standings ===
Pos	Team	Pld	W	L	T	NR	Pts	NRR
1	Warwickshire Bears	8	5	2	0	1	11	0.230
2	Gloucestershire Gladiators	8	4	2	0	2	10	0.986
3	Worcestershire Royals	8	3	2	0	3	9	−0.591
4	Northamptonshire Steelbacks	8	2	3	0	3	7	0.055
5	Somerset Sabres	8	3	5	0	0	6	−0.214
6	Glamorgan Dragons	8	1	4	0	3	5	−0.663

Source: Cricinfo

== North Group ==
=== Standings ===
Pos	Team	Pld	W	L	T	NR	Pts	NRR
1	Nottinghamshire Outlaws	6	4	1	0	1	9	0.876
2	Lancashire Lightning	8	3	1	0	4	10	0.855
3	Yorkshire Phoenix	8	4	3	0	1	9	−0.052
4	Leicestershire Foxes	8	2	1	0	5	9	−0.142
5	Durham Dynamos	8	1	4	0	3	5	−0.575
6	Derbyshire Phantoms	8	0	4	0	4	4	−1.097

Source: Cricinfo

== South Group ==
=== Standings ===
Pos	Team	Pld	W	L	T	NR	Pts	NRR
1	Sussex Sharks	8	5	2	0	1	11	0.179
2	Kent Spitfires	8	4	2	1	1	10	0.324
3	Surrey Brown Caps	8	4	4	0	0	8	0.809
4	Essex Eagles	8	3	4	0	1	7	−0.365
5	Middlesex Crusaders	8	2	3	0	3	7	−0.204
6	Hampshire Hawks	8	1	4	1	2	5	−1.116

Source: Cricinfo

== Quarter finals ==
17 July 2007

Gloucestershire Gladiators; 131/3	v	Worcestershire Royals; 123/6

Gloucestershire won by 7 wickets (D/L)
New Road, Worcester

17 July 2007

Nottinghamshire Outlaws; 138/10	v	Kent Spitfires; 139/1

Kent won by 9 wickets
Trent Bridge, Nottingham

18 July 2007

Warwickshire Bears; 187/7	v	Lancashire Lightning; 193/5

Lancashire won by 6 runs
Edgbaston, Birmingham

18 July 2007

Sussex Sharks; 193/5	v	Yorkshire Phoenix; 155/5

Sussex won by 38 runs
County Ground, Hove

== Finals Day ==
=== Semi finals ===
4 August 2007

Lancashire Lightning; 148/6	v	Gloucestershire Gladiators; 152/2

Gloucestershire won by 8 wickets
Edgbaston, Birmingham

4 August 2007

Sussex Sharks; 140/10	v	Kent Spitfires; 141/5

Kent win by 5 wickets
Edgbaston, Birmingham

=== Final ===
4 August 2007

Gloucestershire Gladiators; 146/8	v	Kent Spitfires; 147/6

Kent win by 4 wickets
Edgbaston, Birmingham
