= Simon Cook (English cricketer) =

English cricketer

Personal information
- Full name: Simon James Cook
- Born: 15 January 1977 (age 49); Oxford, England
- Nickname: Cooky, Chef, Buffet
- Height: 6 ft 4 in (1.93 m)
- Batting: Right-handed
- Bowling: Right arm medium-fast
- Role: Bowler
- Relatives: Adam Cook (brother)

Domestic team information
- Years: Team
- 1997–2004: Middlesex
- 2005–2012: Kent (squad no. 7)

Career statistics
Competition	FC	LA	T20
Matches	141	190	73
Runs scored	2,557	1,253	168
Batting average	16.62	16.93	18.66
100s/50s	0/7	0/2	0/0
Top score	93*	67*	25*
Balls bowled	21,031	8,257	1,531
Wickets	342	234	85
Bowling average	32.14	27.93	22.57
5 wickets in innings	12	2	0
10 wickets in match	0	0	0
Best bowling	8/63	6/37	3/13
Catches/stumpings	34/–	29/–	15/–
- Source: ESPNcricinfo, 6 October 2023

Simon James Cook (born 15 January 1977) is an English cricket administrator and former professional cricketer. A right-arm medium-fast bowler who played for Middlesex and Kent County Cricket Clubs between 1999 and 2012. Cook batted right handed. Following his playing career he worked in a number of coaching roles including as head coach of the Hong Kong cricket team from 2015 to 2019 and was appointed director of cricket by Kent in 2023.

Cook was born in Oxford. His brother, Adam, has played Minor counties and List A cricket for Oxfordshire.

== Cricket career ==
Cook initially played in 1996 for Cumnor in Oxfordshire before a year later being signed by Middlesex along with Andrew Strauss. After suffering from shin splints and stress fractures he gradually established himself as a front-line bowler in the County Championship. In 2004 he took 39 wickets in the National League, equalling the record of Adam Hollioake.

After seven years at Middlesex, Cook signed a contract with Kent at the end of 2004. He became a regular first teamer, mostly taking the new ball. He won the 2007 Twenty20 Cup and the 2009 County Championship Division Two title with the county. He retired from county cricket at the end of the 2012 county season.

== Coaching career ==
He had completed his coaching training to the highest level whilst still a player and took a role coaching France before the 2013 European T20 Championship. He then took a role as head coach of the Hong Kong Cricket Club before becoming the bowling coach of the Hong Kong national cricket team in 2013.

In 2015 he was appointed the interim head coach of the Hong Kong national team. He went on to be appointed to the role in 2016. His time as head coach saw the team record their first One Day International and first-class victories in 2015, take part in the 2016 ICC World Twenty20 and record a first victory over an ICC Full Member, beating Afghanistan in 2018. The team won its first international tournament in 10 years under Cook's leadership in 2018, winning the 2018 Asia Cup Qualifier tournament.

Cook left the Hong Kong post in July 2019, returning to the UK. He was appointed as specialist bowling coach at Kent in September, taking up the role in October.

He was appointed as Kent's director of cricket in 2023, replacing the retiring Paul Downton.
