= Kent County Cricket Club in 2011 =

Kent County Cricket Club
2011 season
- Coach: (England) Paul Farbrace
- Captain: (England) Rob Key
- Overseas players: (Pakistan) Wahab Riaz (June–August) (South Africa) Charl Langeveldt (Twenty20 only)
- Ground(s): St Lawrence Ground, Canterbury; Nevill Ground, Tunbridge Wells; County Ground, Beckenham
- County Championship: 8th, Division Two
- Clydesdale Bank 40: 4th, Group A
- Friends Life t20: Quarter-finals
- Most runs: FC: JL Denly (1,024); LA: M van Jaarsveld (538); T20: Azhar Mahmood (485)
- Most wickets: FC: JC Tredwell (42); LA: Azhar Mahmood (18); T20: Wahab Riaz (20)
- Most catches: FC: M van Jaarsveld (24); LA: M van Jaarsveld (7); T20: AJ Ball (9)
- Most wicket-keeping dismissals: FC: GO Jones (61); LA: GO Jones (11); T20: GO Jones (9)

In 2011, Kent County Cricket Club competed in Division Two of the County Championship, Group A of the 40-over Clydesdale Bank 40 and the South Group of the Friends Life t20. Kent also hosted a Twenty20 match at the St Lawrence Ground against the touring Indians, and a three-day first-class MCC Universities match against Loughborough MCCU, also at the St Lawrence Ground. It was the second and final season in charge for Director of Cricket Paul Farbrace. The club captain was former England batsman Rob Key who had been club captain since 2006. Pakistan fast bowler Wahab Riaz joined Kent as their overseas player in June, and another fast bowler, South African Charl Langeveldt, signed as Kent's second overseas player for the Friends Life t20 competition only.

Kent finished a very disappointing eighth of nine in Division Two of the County Championship in their first season since relegation from Division One. They won 6 and lost 6 matches in the Clydesdale Bank 40, leaving them in the middle of the final Group A standings (they did not progress to the knock-out stages). Kent did progress to the quarter-final stage of the Friends Life t20 after finishing in 3rd place in the South Group, with the side winning 9 out of 14 completed matches. They lost their quarter final at Grace Road against Leicestershire, in what was a high scoring game, by 3 wickets.

== Squad ==
Fast bowler Amjad Khan left Kent at the end of the 2010 season to join Sussex, having been at the county since 2001. This, coupled with injuries affecting the remaining bowling unit, lead to Kent making several new signings.

Pakistan fast bowler Wahab Riaz joined Kent as their overseas player in June. Another fast bowler, South African Charl Langeveldt, signed as Kent's second overseas player for the Friends Life t20 competition only (two overseas players were permitted in this tournament). Langeveldt also played a single match in the Clydesdale Bank Pro40 competition against the Netherlands immediately after the conclusion of the Twenty20 group stage. Charlie Shreck signed on loan from Nottinghamshire in early April, but was recalled by his county just a few days later after playing in just one County Championship match. Shreck would later sign for Kent on a permanent contract after being released by Nottinghamshire at the end of the season, and would remain at the club for the next two seasons.

South Africa-born Scotland international bowler Dewald Nel left Kent early in the season due to an ongoing back injury. Nel had signed a two-year contract with Kent in March 2010. Former Surrey bowler Neil Saker was on trial with Kent over the winter and played four first-class matches in May due to injuries to several other bowlers. However, he did not win a long-term contract. Kent signed David Balcombe from Hampshire on loan in early July initially for one month, but the player remained at the county until the end of the season.

The squad for 2011 featured a number of young players, including Adam Ball, Sam Billings, Daniel Bell-Drummond, Adam Riley and Ashley Shaw, who all made their first-class debuts during the season.

Fast bowler Robbie Joseph left the club after the end of the season, having debuted for the county in 2004, and would go on to sign for Leicestershire. Joseph would return to the county for a brief spell in 2014.

Kent suffered a double blow at the end of the 2011 season when high-profile players Joe Denly and Martin van Jaarsveld left the county. Van Jaarsveld had initially agreed to join Leicestershire, but later cancelled the deal and instead announced his retirement from county cricket in November 2011, citing fatigue. Denly signed for Middlesex in order to play Division One cricket and enhance his chances of reviving his international career with England. Denly and van Jaarsveld debuted for Kent in 2004 and 2005, respectively.

=== Squad list ===
- Ages given as of the first day of the County Championship season, 8 April 2011.

Name	Nationality	Birth date	Batting style	Bowling style	Notes
Batsmen
Daniel Bell-Drummond	England	3 August 1993 (aged 17)	Right-handed	Right arm medium	
Alex Blake	England	25 January 1989 (aged 22)	Left-handed	Right arm medium-fast	
Joe Denly	England	16 March 1986 (aged 25)	Right-handed	Right arm leg break	
James Goodman	England	19 November 1990 (aged 20)	Right-handed	Right arm medium	
Rob Key	England	12 May 1979 (aged 31)	Right-handed	Right arm off break	Club captain
Sam Northeast	England	16 October 1989 (aged 21)	Right-handed	Right arm off break	
Chris Piesley	England	12 February 1992 (aged 19)	Left-handed	Right arm off break	
Martin van Jaarsveld	South Africa	18 June 1974 (aged 36)	Right-handed	Right arm medium / Right arm off break	Kolpak player, vice-captain
All-rounders
Azhar Mahmood	Pakistan	28 February 1975 (aged 36)	Right-handed	Right arm fast-medium	British citizen
Adam Ball	England	1 March 1993 (aged 18)	Right-handed	Left arm fast-medium	
Matt Coles	England	26 May 1990 (aged 20)	Left-handed	Right arm fast-medium	
Darren Stevens	England	30 April 1976 (aged 34)	Right-handed	Right arm medium	
Wicket-keepers
Sam Billings	England	15 June 1991 (aged 19)	Right-handed	—	
Geraint Jones	England	14 July 1979 (aged 31)	Right-handed	—	
Bowlers
David Balcombe	England	24 December 1984 (aged 26)	Right-handed	Right arm medium-fast	On loan from Hampshire (9 July to the end of the season)
Simon Cook	England	15 January 1977 (aged 34)	Right-handed	Right arm medium-fast	
Robbie Joseph	England	20 January 1982 (aged 29)	Right-handed	Right arm fast	
Charl Langeveldt	South Africa	17 December 1974 (aged 36)	Right-handed	Right arm fast-medium	Overseas player (June–July; Twenty20 only)
Dewald Nel	Scotland	6 June 1980 (aged 30)	Right-handed	Right arm medium-fast	Left in May due to injury
Adam Riley	England	23 March 1992 (aged 19)	Right-handed	Right arm off break	
Neil Saker	England	20 September 1984 (aged 26)	Right-handed	Left arm medium	Trial contract (April–May)
Ashley Shaw	England	15 April 1991 (aged 19)	Right-handed	Left arm fast-medium	
Charlie Shreck	England	6 January 1978 (aged 33)	Right-handed	Right arm fast-medium	On loan from Nottinghamshire (April)
James Tredwell	England	27 February 1982 (aged 29)	Left-handed	Right arm off break	
Wahab Riaz	Pakistan	28 June 1985 (aged 25)	Right-handed	Left arm fast	Overseas player (June–August)

== County Championship ==
=== Division Two ===
Team	Pld	W	L	T	D	A	Bat	Bowl	Ded	Pts
Middlesex (C, P)	16	8	2	0	6	0	50	44	0.0	240
Surrey (P)	16	8	4	0	4	0	43	44	0.0	227
Northamptonshire	16	7	2	0	7	0	48	45	0.0	226
Gloucestershire	16	6	5	0	5	0	41	47	1.0	198
Derbyshire	16	5	6	0	5	0	42	44	0.0	181
Glamorgan	16	5	6	0	4	0	44	40	1.0	178
Essex	16	4	4	0	8	0	29	44	2.0	159
Kent	16	5	9	0	2	0	30	42	9.0	149
Leicestershire	16	1	11	0	4	0	24	36	0.0	88

=== Matches ===
8–11 April	Kent	v	(H) Essex	Kent won by 57 runs
Scorecard	247 (70 overs); SA Northeast 112 (170); Maurice Chambers 3/51 (18 overs)		201 (76 overs); JS Foster 88* (161); DI Stevens 6/60 (27 overs)	County Ground, Chelmsford; Umpires: RK Illingworth and TE Jesty
Scorecard	238 (74.4 overs); M van Jaarsveld 63 (113); RJW Topley 5/46 (17.4 overs)		227 (70.1 overs); BA Godleman 58 (97); RH Joseph 4/25 (13.1 overs)	County Ground, Chelmsford; Umpires: RK Illingworth and TE Jesty
Kent won the toss and elected to bat; Points: Essex 4, Kent 20

14–16 April	Kent	v	(H) Northamptonshire	Northamptonshire won by an innings and 159 runs
Scorecard	202 (55.1 overs); RWT Key 46 (120); WPUJC Vaas 3/70 (19 overs)		480 (157.4 overs); AJ Hall 146 (297); SJ Cook 3/72 (29.4 overs)	County Ground, Northampton; Umpires: G Sharp and JF Steele
Scorecard	119 (36.2 overs); JC Tredwell 35 (59); JA Brooks 4/36 (13 overs)			County Ground, Northampton; Umpires: G Sharp and JF Steele
Kent won the toss and elected to bat; Points: Northamptonshire 22, Kent 3

26–29 April	Gloucestershire	v	(H) Kent	Gloucestershire won by 45 runs
Scorecard	292 (97.3 overs); HJH Marshall 72 (131); SJ Cook 3/40 (14.3 overs)		208 (68.1 overs); AJ Ball 46 (104); J Lewis 3/33 (15.1 overs)	St Lawrence Ground, Canterbury; Umpires: SC Gale and TE Jesty
Scorecard	206 (85.3 overs); ID Saxelby 34* (81); Azhar Mahmood 4/56 (25.3 overs)		245 (79.3 overs); Azhar Mahmood 70 (119); WRS Gidman 3/37 (13.3 overs)	St Lawrence Ground, Canterbury; Umpires: SC Gale and TE Jesty
Gloucestershire won the toss and elected to bat; Points: Kent 4, Gloucestershire 21 AJ Ball made his first-class debut

4–7 May	Kent (H)	v	Northamptonshire	Northamptonshire won by 5 wickets
Scorecard	280 (89.5 overs); M van Jaarsveld 67 (111); JD Middlebrook 3/42 (12 overs)		493 (133.1 overs); AJ Hall 100 (232); AEN Riley 4/145 (34 overs)	St Lawrence Ground, Canterbury; Umpires: RJ Bailey and NGC Cowley
Scorecard	320 (81.2 overs); DI Stevens 143 (137); JA Brooks 3/56 (17.2 overs)		108/5 (24.4 overs); RA White 40 (34); JC Tredwell 3/41 (9.4 overs)	St Lawrence Ground, Canterbury; Umpires: RJ Bailey and NGC Cowley
Kent won the toss and elected to bat; Points: Kent 4, Northamptonshire 24 Adam Riley made his first-class debut Neil Saker made his first appearance for Kent

10–12 May	Kent	v	(H) Glamorgan	Glamorgan won by an innings and 8 runs
Scorecard	242 (66.1 overs); DI Stevens 66 (81); WT Owen 3/37 (13.1 overs)		434 (117.3 overs); MA Wallace 107 (187); NC Saker 5/112 (38 overs)	Sophia Gardens, Cardiff; Umpires: NGB Cook and SA Garratt
Scorecard	184 (42.3 overs); AJ Blake 51 (62); WT Owen 3/24 (7 overs)			Sophia Gardens, Cardiff; Umpires: NGB Cook and SA Garratt
Glamorgan won the toss and elected to field; Points: Glamorgan 24, Kent 3

24–27 May	Derbyshire	v	(H) Kent	Match drawn
Scorecard	460 (127.1 overs); WL Madsen 140 (251); SA Shaw 5/118 (26.1 overs)		352 (95.5 overs); M van Jaarsveld 95 (140); TD Groenewald 4/64 (27 overs)	St Lawrence Ground, Canterbury; Umpires: JH Evans and PJ Hartley
Scorecard	256/4d (56.5 overs); WL Madsen 71 (111); NC Saker 1/28 (7 overs)		94/2 (25.5 overs); RWT Key 59* (78); AP Palladino 1/17 (5 overs)	St Lawrence Ground, Canterbury; Umpires: JH Evans and PJ Hartley
Derbyshire won the toss and elected to bat; Points: Kent 9, Derbyshire 11

29 May – 1 June	Kent (H)	v	Leicestershire	Kent won by 5 wickets
Scorecard	459 (118.4 overs); JL Denly 143 (247); WA White 4/66 (19.4 overs)		251 (77.5 overs); WI Jefferson 77 (101); JC Tredwell 5/55 (24 overs)	Nevill Ground, Tunbridge Wells; Umpires: NL Bainton and P Willey
Scorecard	157/5 (43.1 overs); JL Denly 74 (102); CW Henderson 4/61 (14 overs)		362 (100.1 overs) (f/o); JWA Taylor 96 (145); RH Joseph 4/74 (17 overs)	Nevill Ground, Tunbridge Wells; Umpires: NL Bainton and P Willey
Kent won the toss and elected to bat; Points: Kent 24, Leicestershire 3

19–21 June	Kent	v	(H) Middlesex	Middlesex won by 9 wickets
Scorecard	87 (31.4 overs); Azhar Mahmood 32 (41); TJ Murtagh 5/27 (9 overs)		153 (44.3 overs); SD Robson 40 (65); Azhar Mahmood 6/36 (16.3 overs)	Lord's, St John's Wood, London; Umpires: SA Garratt and NJ Llong
Scorecard	232 (63.4 overs); SJ Cook 51 (90); TJ Murtagh 4/83 (18 overs)		168/1 (37.4 overs); SD Robson 94* (121); JL Denly 1/34 (5 overs)	Lord's, St John's Wood, London; Umpires: SA Garratt and NJ Llong
Middlesex won the toss and elected to field; Points: Middlesex 19, Kent 3

10–13 July	Surrey (H)	v	Kent	Surrey won by 21 runs
Scorecard	387 (83 overs); Z de Bruyn 179 (200); JL Denly 3/71 (19 overs)		250 (66.4 overs); AJ Blake 96 (126); TE Linley 3/52 (15 overs)	The Oval, Kennington, London; Umpires: NGB Cook and PJ Hartley
Scorecard	184 (58.3 overs); SM Davies 39 (44); DJ Balcombe 5/63 (21.3 overs)		300 (98.2 overs); RWT Key 162 (289); TE Linley 4/48 (23 overs)	The Oval, Kennington, London; Umpires: NGB Cook and PJ Hartley
Surrey won the toss and elected to bat; Points: Surrey 23, Kent 5

20–22 July	Kent	v	(H) Gloucestershire	Gloucestershire won by an innings and 142 runs
Scorecard	205 (63.3 overs); DI Stevens 67 (138); WRS Gidman 5/38 (14 overs)		515 (118.2 overs); CG Taylor 196 (248); DJ Balcombe 5/103 (29.2 overs)	College Ground, Cheltenham, Cheltenham; Umpires: MJD Bodenham and MA Gough
Scorecard	168 (42.5 overs); SJ Cook 46* (39); DA Payne 4/60 (11.5 overs)			College Ground, Cheltenham, Cheltenham; Umpires: MJD Bodenham and MA Gough
Gloucestershire won the toss and elected to field; Points: Gloucestershire 24, Kent 3

2–5 August	Leicestershire (H)	v	Kent	Match drawn
Scorecard	257 (77.4 overs); CW Henderson 54 (84); Wahab Riaz 4/94 (19 overs)		219 (59.4 overs); DI Stevens 67 (85); JKH Naik 5/34 (10.2)	Grace Road, Leicester; Umpires: PJ Hartley and TE Jesty
Scorecard	289/9d (90.1 overs); TJ New 76 (101); Azhar Mahmood 4/42 (17.1 overs)		255/6 (67 overs); RWT Key 98 (153); WA White 2/26 (6 overs)	Grace Road, Leicester; Umpires: PJ Hartley and TE Jesty
Leicestershire won the toss and elected to bat; Points: Leicestershire 8, Kent 7

10–12 August	Kent (H)	v	Surrey	Kent won by 265 runs
Scorecard	266 (81.1 overs); JL Denly 49 (73); Yasir Arafat 3/62 (22 overs)		127 (43.1 overs); RJ Hamilton-Brown 34 (44); DI Stevens 7/21 (15.1 overs)	St Lawrence Ground, Canterbury; Umpires: SC Gale and JF Steele
Scorecard	230 (72.5 overs); RWT Key 110* (202); TE Linley 4/48 (18 overs)		104 (28.2 overs); RJ Hamilton-Brown 40 (61); JC Tredwell 5/35 (9.2 overs)	St Lawrence Ground, Canterbury; Umpires: SC Gale and JF Steele
Kent won the toss and elected to bat; Points: Kent 21, Surrey 3

17–20 August	Kent (H)	v	Middlesex	Kent won by 69 runs
Scorecard	242 (64.2 overs); JL Denly 55 (93); CD Collymore 4/69 (20 overs)		303 (89.3 overs); SD Robson 95 (167); Wahab Riaz 3/33 (10.3 overs)	St Lawrence Ground, Canterbury; Umpires: JH Evans and G Sharp
Scorecard	332 (93.1 overs); Azhar Mahmood 92* (140); ST Finn 5/113 (30 overs)		202 (66.4 overs); JWM Dalrymple 108* (168); DI Stevens 4/52 (18 overs)	St Lawrence Ground, Canterbury; Umpires: JH Evans and G Sharp
Kent won the toss and elected to bat; Points: Kent 20, Middlesex 6

31 August – 2 September	Essex	v	(H) Kent	Kent won by 6 wickets
Scorecard	144 (53.4 overs); JS Foster 38 (75); DJ Balcombe 6/51 (15.4 overs)		260 (76.2 overs); JL Denly 55 (53); DD Masters 6/78 (22 overs)	St Lawrence Ground, Canterbury; Umpires: NGB Cook and SJ O'Shaughnessy
Scorecard	185 (61.2 overs); JS Foster 49* (99); DJ Balcombe 4/51 (16.2 overs)		72/4 (14.3 overs); GO Jones 28* (14); GR Napier 3/42 (7 overs)	St Lawrence Ground, Canterbury; Umpires: NGB Cook and SJ O'Shaughnessy
Essex won the toss and elected to bat; Points: Kent 13, Essex 3 (Kent were deducted 8 points after the pitch was rated as 'poor')

7–10 September	Derbyshire (H)	v	Kent	Derbyshire won by 101 runs
Scorecard	535 (114.5 overs); RA Whiteley 130* (162); DJ Balcombe 6/128 (32 overs)		419 (108.2 overs); JL Denly 199 (307); AD Palladino 5/84 (24 overs)	County Ground, Derby; Umpires: NL Bainton and MA Gough
Scorecard	181 (43.1 overs); WL Madsen 73 (122); DI Stevens 3/17 (4.1 overs)		196 (46.4 overs); JL Denly 68 (73); JL Clare 4/36 (11 overs)	County Ground, Derby; Umpires: NL Bainton and MA Gough
Kent won the toss and elected to field; Points: Derbyshire 24, Kent 7 JL Denly's 189 in the second innings was his highest score in first-class cricket

12–15 September	Kent (H)	v	Glamorgan	Glamorgan won by 8 wickets
Scorecard	237 (88.1 overs); JL Denly 69 (130); JC Glover 4/49 (18 overs)		423/9d (135 overs); SJ Walters 147 (257); Azhar Mahmood 2/39 (21 overs)	St Lawrence Ground, Canterbury; Umpires: MJD Bodenham and AG Wharf
Scorecard	312 (102.5 overs); GO Jones 79 (168); DA Cosker 4/106 (40 overs)		129/2 (20 overs); AN Peterson 70* (54); AJ Ball 1/28 (5 overs)	St Lawrence Ground, Canterbury; Umpires: MJD Bodenham and AG Wharf
Kent won the toss and elected to bat; Points: Kent 3, Glamorgan 22

== Other first-class match ==
=== MCCU match ===
18–19 May (three-day match)	Kent (H)	v	Loughborough MCCU	Kent won by an innings ad 70 runs
Scorecard	450/7d (93.3 overs); SA Northeast 176 (198); O Wilkin 2/63 (15 overs)		127 (37.5 overs); WA Tavaré 53 (101); MT Coles 5/29 (14.5 overs)	St Lawrence Ground, Canterbury; Umpires: PK Baldwin and MJD Bodenham
Scorecard			253 (63.1 overs); WA Tavaré 59 (90); AEN Riley 5/76 (20.1 overs)	St Lawrence Ground, Canterbury; Umpires: PK Baldwin and MJD Bodenham
Kent won the toss and elected to bat; DJ Bell-Drummond and SA Shaw made their first-class debuts SW Billings made his first appearance for Kent

== Clydesdale Bank 40 ==
=== Group A ===
Team	Pld	W	L	T	N/R	Pts	Net R/R
Sussex Sharks	12	8	4	0	0	16	+1.070
Middlesex Panthers	12	8	4	0	0	16	+0.213
Derbyshire Falcons	12	6	5	1	0	13	−0.079
Kent Spitfires	12	6	6	0	0	12	−0.017
Netherlands	12	5	5	1	1	12	−0.361
Yorkshire Carnegie	12	5	7	0	0	10	−0.147
Worcestershire Royals	12	2	9	0	1	5	−0.710

=== Matches ===
1 May	Kent (H); 232/8 (40 overs)	v	Worcestershire; 233/4 (39.3 overs)	Worcestershire won by 6 wickets (with 3 balls remaining)
Scorecard	Kent (H); 232/8 (40 overs)	v	Worcestershire; 233/4 (39.3 overs)	St Lawrence Ground, Canterbury; Umpires: MA Gough and SJ O'Shaughnessy; Player of the match: AN Kervezee (Worcestershire)
Scorecard	M van Jaarsveld 81 (81); GM Andrew 3/41 (8 overs)		AN Kervezee 69 (84); AEN Riley 2/37 (8 overs)	St Lawrence Ground, Canterbury; Umpires: MA Gough and SJ O'Shaughnessy; Player of the match: AN Kervezee (Worcestershire)
Kent won the toss and elected to bat; Points: Kent 0, Worcestershire 2 AEN Riley and SA Shaw made their List A debuts				St Lawrence Ground, Canterbury; Umpires: MA Gough and SJ O'Shaughnessy; Player of the match: AN Kervezee (Worcestershire)

2 May	Middlesex (H); 176/9 (40 overs)	v	Kent; 178/2 (31 overs)	Kent won by 8 wickets (with 54 balls remaining)
Scorecard	Middlesex (H); 176/9 (40 overs)	v	Kent; 178/2 (31 overs)	Lord's, St John's Wood, London; Umpires: MA Gough and NJ Llong
Scorecard	SA Newman 49 (73); SA Shaw 3/26 (7 overs)		M van Jaarsveld 85 (73); TJ Murtagh 1/27 (3 overs)	Lord's, St John's Wood, London; Umpires: MA Gough and NJ Llong
Kent won the toss and elected to field; Points: Middlesex 0, Kent 2				Lord's, St John's Wood, London; Umpires: MA Gough and NJ Llong

8 May	Yorkshire; 254/7 (40 overs)	v	(H) Kent; 161 (31.4 overs)	Yorkshire won by 93 runs
Scorecard	Yorkshire; 254/7 (40 overs)	v	(H) Kent; 161 (31.4 overs)	St Lawrence Ground, Canterbury; Umpires: RJ Bailey and NGC Cowley
Scorecard	AW Gale 112 (114); AJ Ball 2/33 (5 overs)		DI Stevens 39 (46); AU Rashid 3/30 (8 overs)	St Lawrence Ground, Canterbury; Umpires: RJ Bailey and NGC Cowley
Yorkshire win the toss and elected ro bat; Points: Kent 0, Yorkshire 2				St Lawrence Ground, Canterbury; Umpires: RJ Bailey and NGC Cowley

15 May	Yorkshire (H); 230/7 (40 overs)	v	Kent; 232/8 (39.4 overs)	Kent won by 2 wickets (with 2 balls remaining)
Scorecard	Yorkshire (H); 230/7 (40 overs)	v	Kent; 232/8 (39.4 overs)	Headingley, Leeds; Umpires: JW Lloyds and NA Mallender
Scorecard	A Shahzad 59* (34); AJ Blake 2/13 (2 overs)		M van Jaarsveld 74 (65); SA Patterson 3/45 (8 overs)	Headingley, Leeds; Umpires: JW Lloyds and NA Mallender
Kent won the toss and elected to field; Points: Yorkshire 0, Kent 2				Headingley, Leeds; Umpires: JW Lloyds and NA Mallender

22 May	Sussex; 249 (40 overs)	v	(H) Kent; 230/9 (40 overs)	Sussex won by 19 runs
Scorecard	Sussex; 249 (40 overs)	v	(H) Kent; 230/9 (40 overs)	St Lawrence Ground, Canterbury; Umpires: JH Evans and P Willey
Scorecard	CD Nash 124* (119); Azhar Mahmood 3/52 (8 overs)		RWT Key 59 (81); MS Panesar 2/28 (6 overs)	St Lawrence Ground, Canterbury; Umpires: JH Evans and P Willey
Kent won the toss and elected to field; Points: Kent 0, Sussex 2				St Lawrence Ground, Canterbury; Umpires: JH Evans and P Willey

17 July	Netherlands (H); 206/8 (37 overs)	v	Kent; 165 (34.5 overs)	Netherlands won by 40 runs (D/L method)
Scorecard	Netherlands (H); 206/8 (37 overs)	v	Kent; 165 (34.5 overs)	Hazelaarweg Stadion, Rotterdam; Umpires: TE Jesty and RA Kettleborough
Scorecard	PW Borren 71* (33); JL Denly 3/42 (7 overs)		M van Jaarsveld 61 (52); SM Mott 3/27 (6.5 overs)	Hazelaarweg Stadion, Rotterdam; Umpires: TE Jesty and RA Kettleborough
Kent won the toss and elected to field; After two early rain delays, and with Netherlands 3/1 from 2 overs, the match was reduced to 37 overs per side; Points: Netherlands 2, Kent 0 SW Billings and CD Piesley made their List A debuts				Hazelaarweg Stadion, Rotterdam; Umpires: TE Jesty and RA Kettleborough

24 July	Derbyshire (H); 249/9 (40 overs)	v	Kent; 218 (34.1 overs)	Derbyshire won by 31 runs
Scorecard	Derbyshire (H); 249/9 (40 overs)	v	Kent; 218 (34.1 overs)	County Ground, Derby; Umpires: GD Lloyd and NA Mallender
Scorecard	MJ Guptill 102 (109); Azhar Mahmood 4/57 (8 overs)		DI Stevens 65 (52); JL Clare 3/61 (7.1 overs)	County Ground, Derby; Umpires: GD Lloyd and NA Mallender
Kent won the toss and elected to field; Points: Derbyshire 2, Kent 0				County Ground, Derby; Umpires: GD Lloyd and NA Mallender

31 July	Kent; 291/7 (40 overs)	v	(H) Worcestershire; 205 (34.3 overs)	Kent won by 86 runs
Scorecard	Kent; 291/7 (40 overs)	v	(H) Worcestershire; 205 (34.3 overs)	New Road, Worcester; Umpires: I Dawood and NA Mallender
Scorecard	M van Jaarsveld 124 (97); Saeed Ajmal 3/42 (8 overs)		MM Ali 55 (35); DJ Balcombe 4/38 (5.3 overs)	New Road, Worcester; Umpires: I Dawood and NA Mallender
Kent won the toss and elected to bat; Points: Worcestershire 0, Kent 2 DJ Bell-Drummond made his List A debut				New Road, Worcester; Umpires: I Dawood and NA Mallender

14 August	Netherlands; 199/6 (40 overs)	v	(H) Kent; 200/6 (35.5 overs)	Kent won by 4 wickets (with 25 balls remaining)
Scorecard	Netherlands; 199/6 (40 overs)	v	(H) Kent; 200/6 (35.5 overs)	St Lawrence Ground, Canterbury; Umpires: SC Gale and JF Steele
Scorecard	Mudassar Bukhari 78* (62); AJ Ball 2/32 (7 overs)		DI Stevens 70 (67); SM Mott 3/50 (8 overs)	St Lawrence Ground, Canterbury; Umpires: SC Gale and JF Steele
Netherlands won the toss and elected to bat; Points: Kent 2, Netherlands 0				St Lawrence Ground, Canterbury; Umpires: SC Gale and JF Steele

16 August	Middlesex; 263 (39.3 overs)	v	(H) Kent; 264/8 (39.3 overs)	Kent won by 2 wickets (with 3 balls remaining)
Scorecard	Middlesex; 263 (39.3 overs)	v	(H) Kent; 264/8 (39.3 overs)	St Lawrence Ground, Canterbury; Umpires: RJ Bailey and G Sharp; Player of the match: Azhar Mahmood (Kent)
Scorecard	DJ Malan 107 (1130; Wahab Riaz 5/46 (6.3 overs)		DI Stevens 65 (54); TS Roland-Jones 3/51 (8 overs)	St Lawrence Ground, Canterbury; Umpires: RJ Bailey and G Sharp; Player of the match: Azhar Mahmood (Kent)
Middlesex won the toss and elected to bat; Points: Kent 2, Middlesex 0				St Lawrence Ground, Canterbury; Umpires: RJ Bailey and G Sharp; Player of the match: Azhar Mahmood (Kent)

23 August	Kent; 216 (40 overs)	v	(H) Sussex; 202 (39 overs)	Kent won by 14 runs
Scorecard	Kent; 216 (40 overs)	v	(H) Sussex; 202 (39 overs)	County Ground, Hove; Umpires: RJ Bailey and PJ Hartley; Player of the match: Azhar Mahmood (Kent)
Scorecard	Azhar Mahmood 58 (53); WD Parnell 3/31 (8 overs)		CD Nash 49 (34); AJ Ball 2/31 (8 overs)	County Ground, Hove; Umpires: RJ Bailey and PJ Hartley; Player of the match: Azhar Mahmood (Kent)
Kent won the toss and elected to bat; Points: Sussex 0, Kent 2				County Ground, Hove; Umpires: RJ Bailey and PJ Hartley; Player of the match: Azhar Mahmood (Kent)

29 August	Kent (H); 208/9 (40 overs)	v	Derbyshire; 211/7 (39.3 overs)	Derbyshire won by 3 wickets (with 3 balls remaining)
Scorecard	Kent (H); 208/9 (40 overs)	v	Derbyshire; 211/7 (39.3 overs)	St Lawrence Ground, Canterbury; Umpires: RK Illingworth and RT Robinson
Scorecard	Azhar Mahmood 68 (93); AP Palladino 4/32 (7 overs)		WL Madsen 64 (69); JC Tredwell 2/35 (8 overs)	St Lawrence Ground, Canterbury; Umpires: RK Illingworth and RT Robinson
Kent won the toss and elected to bat; Points: Kent 0, Derbyshire 2				St Lawrence Ground, Canterbury; Umpires: RK Illingworth and RT Robinson

== Friends Life t20 ==
=== South Division ===
Pos	Team	Pld	W	L	T	NR	Pts	NRR
1	Hampshire Royals^{[nb1]} (Note: The Hampshire Royals began the tournament on minus two points for a poor pitch from last season.)	16	11	2	0	3	23	1.093
2	Sussex Sharks	16	9	5	0	2	20	0.061
3	Kent Spitfires	16	9	5	0	2	20	−0.205
4	Somerset	16	7	4	1	4	19	0.978
5	Surrey Lions	16	7	6	0	3	17	0.131
6	Essex Eagles	16	7	7	0	2	16	−0.086
7	Glamorgan Dragons	16	5	9	0	2	12	0.045
8	Gloucestershire Gladiators	16	4	11	0	1	9	−0.473
9	Middlesex Panthers	16	2	12	1	1	6	−1.247

Source: Cricinfo

=== Matches ===
3 June	Kent (H); 163/8 (20 overs)	v	Somerset; 166/1 (17 overs)	Somerset won by 9 wickets (with 18 balls remaining)
Scorecard	Kent (H); 163/8 (20 overs)	v	Somerset; 166/1 (17 overs)	Nevill Ground, Tunbridge Wells; Umpires: NL Bainton and RA Kettleborough; Player of the match: RE van der Merwe (Somerset)
Scorecard	DI Stevens 68 (41); L Gregory 3/26 (4 overs)		RE van der Merwe 89* (51); CK Langeveldt 1/42 (4 overs)	Nevill Ground, Tunbridge Wells; Umpires: NL Bainton and RA Kettleborough; Player of the match: RE van der Merwe (Somerset)
Kent won the toss and elected to bat; Points: Kent 0, Somerset 2 AJ Ball made his Twenty20 debut CK Langeveldt made his Kent debut				Nevill Ground, Tunbridge Wells; Umpires: NL Bainton and RA Kettleborough; Player of the match: RE van der Merwe (Somerset)

5 June	Hampshire; 78/1 (5 overs)	v	(H) Kent; 58/2 (5 overs)	Hampshire won by 20 runs
Scorecard	Hampshire; 78/1 (5 overs)	v	(H) Kent; 58/2 (5 overs)	Nevill Ground, Tunbridge Wells; Umpires: DJ Millns and SJ O'Shaughnessy; Player of the match: MJ Lumb (Hampshire)
Scorecard	MJ Lumb 35 (11); AJ Ball 1/28 (1 over)		DI Stevens 45* (16); SP Jones 2/2 (1 over)	Nevill Ground, Tunbridge Wells; Umpires: DJ Millns and SJ O'Shaughnessy; Player of the match: MJ Lumb (Hampshire)
Kent won the toss and elected to field; Match reduced to 5 overs per side due to rain; Points: Kent 0, Hampshire 2				Nevill Ground, Tunbridge Wells; Umpires: DJ Millns and SJ O'Shaughnessy; Player of the match: MJ Lumb (Hampshire)

10 June	Somerset (H)	v	Kent	No result (match abandoned without a toss)
Scorecard	Somerset (H)	v	Kent	County Ground, Taunton; Umpires: RK Illingworth and TE Jesty
No toss; Points: Somerset 1, Kent 1				County Ground, Taunton; Umpires: RK Illingworth and TE Jesty

11 June	Glamorgan (H); 154/5 (20 overs)	v	Kent; 155/4 (19.4 overs)	Kent won by 6 wickets (with 2 balls remaining)
Scorecard	Glamorgan (H); 154/5 (20 overs)	v	Kent; 155/4 (19.4 overs)	Sophia Gardens, Cardiff; Umpires: JH Evans and RK Illingworth; Player of the match: Wahab Riaz (Kent)
Scorecard	AN Petersen 65 (56); CK Langeveldt 2/38 (4 overs)		SA Northeast 33* (20); RDB Croft 2/21 (4 overs)	Sophia Gardens, Cardiff; Umpires: JH Evans and RK Illingworth; Player of the match: Wahab Riaz (Kent)
Kent won the toss and elected to field; Points: Glamorgan 0, Kent 2 SW Billings made his Twenty20 debut Wahab Riaz made his Kent debut				Sophia Gardens, Cardiff; Umpires: JH Evans and RK Illingworth; Player of the match: Wahab Riaz (Kent)

15 June	Gloucestershire; 166 (20 overs)	v	(H) Kent; 167/2 (18.5 overs)	Kent won by 8 wickets (with 7 balls remaining)
Scorecard	Gloucestershire; 166 (20 overs)	v	(H) Kent; 167/2 (18.5 overs)	County Cricket Ground, Beckenham, Beckenham; Umpires: RA Kettleborough and DJ Millns; Player of the match: Azhar Mahmood (Kent)
Scorecard	HJH Marshall 47 (30); Wahab Riaz 5/17 (3 overs)		Azhar Mahmood 106* (57); DA Payne 1/27 (3 overs)	County Cricket Ground, Beckenham, Beckenham; Umpires: RA Kettleborough and DJ Millns; Player of the match: Azhar Mahmood (Kent)
Gloucestershire won the toss and elected to bat; Points: Kent 2, Gloucestershire 0				County Cricket Ground, Beckenham, Beckenham; Umpires: RA Kettleborough and DJ Millns; Player of the match: Azhar Mahmood (Kent)

17 June	Sussex (H)	v	Kent	No result (match abandoned without a toss)
Scorecard	Sussex (H)	v	Kent	County Ground, Hove; Umpires: NL Bainton and NJ Llong
No toss; Points: Sussex 1, Kent 1				County Ground, Hove; Umpires: NL Bainton and NJ Llong

18 June	Kent (H); 115/9 (20 overs)	v	Middlesex; 106/7 (20 overs)	Kent won by 9 runs
Scorecard	Kent (H); 115/9 (20 overs)	v	Middlesex; 106/7 (20 overs)	St Lawrence Ground, Canterbury; Umpires: NGB Cook and SJ O'Shaughnessy; Player of the match: JC Tredwell (Kent)
Scorecard	JC Tredwell 34* (28); AJ Ireland 3/7 (4 overs)		SP Crook 23* (19); Azhar Mahmood 3/14 (4 overs)	St Lawrence Ground, Canterbury; Umpires: NGB Cook and SJ O'Shaughnessy; Player of the match: JC Tredwell (Kent)
Middlesex won the toss and elected to field; Points: Kent 2, Middlesex 0				St Lawrence Ground, Canterbury; Umpires: NGB Cook and SJ O'Shaughnessy; Player of the match: JC Tredwell (Kent)

24 June	Kent; 149/3 (20 overs)	v	(H) Middlesex; 79/1 (8 overs)	Middlesex won by 28 runs (D/L method)
Scorecard	Kent; 149/3 (20 overs)	v	(H) Middlesex; 79/1 (8 overs)	Uxbridge Cricket Club Ground, Uxbridge; Umpires: SA Garratt and PJ Hartley; Player of the match: PR Stirling (Middlesex)
Scorecard	JL Denly 84* (64); TMJ Smith 2/26 (4 overs)		PR Stirling 51* (23); Azhar Mahmood 1/21 (3 overs)	Uxbridge Cricket Club Ground, Uxbridge; Umpires: SA Garratt and PJ Hartley; Player of the match: PR Stirling (Middlesex)
Middlesex won the toss and elected to field; Rain ended play after 8 overs of the Middlesex innings; Points: Middlesex 2, Kent 0				Uxbridge Cricket Club Ground, Uxbridge; Umpires: SA Garratt and PJ Hartley; Player of the match: PR Stirling (Middlesex)

26 June	Surrey; 150/4 (20 overs)	v	(H) Kent; 153/4 (18.1 overs)	Kent won by 6 runs (with 11 balls remaining)
Scorecard	Surrey; 150/4 (20 overs)	v	(H) Kent; 153/4 (18.1 overs)	County Cricket Ground, Beckenham, Beckenham; Umpires: MJD Bodenham and G Sharp; Player of the match: M van Jaarsveld (Kent)
Scorecard	TL Maynard 76 (46); Azhar Mahmood 2/26 (4 overs)		M van Jaarsveld 62 (39); DP Nannes 2/27 (4 overs)	County Cricket Ground, Beckenham, Beckenham; Umpires: MJD Bodenham and G Sharp; Player of the match: M van Jaarsveld (Kent)
Surrey won the toss and elected to bat; Points: Kent 2, Surrey 0				County Cricket Ground, Beckenham, Beckenham; Umpires: MJD Bodenham and G Sharp; Player of the match: M van Jaarsveld (Kent)

30 June	Hampshire (H); 141/6 (20 overs)	v	Kent; 72 (14 overs)	Hampshire won by 69 runs
Scorecard	Hampshire (H); 141/6 (20 overs)	v	Kent; 72 (14 overs)	The Rose Bowl, Southampton; Umpires: SC Gale and NA Mallender; Player of the match: ND McKenzie (Hampshire)
Scorecard	ND McKenzie 48 (46); M van Jaarsveld 3/20 (4 overs)		DI Stevens 20 (18); AD Mascarenhas 3/29 (4 overs)	The Rose Bowl, Southampton; Umpires: SC Gale and NA Mallender; Player of the match: ND McKenzie (Hampshire)
Hampshire won the toss and elected to bat; Points: Hampshire 2, Kent 0				The Rose Bowl, Southampton; Umpires: SC Gale and NA Mallender; Player of the match: ND McKenzie (Hampshire)

1 July	Essex; 153/8 (20 overs)	v	(H) Kent; 156/2 (17.5 overs)	Kent won by 8 wickets (with 13 balls remaining)
Scorecard	Essex; 153/8 (20 overs)	v	(H) Kent; 156/2 (17.5 overs)	St Lawrence Ground, Canterbury; Umpires: MJD Bodenham and NGC Cowley; Player of the match: RWT Key (Kent)
Scorecard	ML Pettini 36 (26); AJ Ball 2/28 (4 overs)		RWT Key 75 (52); TJ Phillips 1/29 (4 overs)	St Lawrence Ground, Canterbury; Umpires: MJD Bodenham and NGC Cowley; Player of the match: RWT Key (Kent)
Kent won the toss and elected to field; Points: Kent 2, Essex 0				St Lawrence Ground, Canterbury; Umpires: MJD Bodenham and NGC Cowley; Player of the match: RWT Key (Kent)

3 July	Glamorgan; 138/6 (20 overs)	v	(H) Kent; 142/5 (19.2 overs)	Kent won by 5 wickets (with 4 balls remaining)
Scorecard	Glamorgan; 138/6 (20 overs)	v	(H) Kent; 142/5 (19.2 overs)	St Lawrence Ground, Canterbury; Umpires: NL Bainton and DJ Millns; Player of the match: SA Northeast (Kent)
Scorecard	AN Petersen 33 (23); AJ Ball 1/19 (4 overs); JC Tredwell 1/19 (4 overs)		SA Northeast 39* (25); RDB Croft 3/27 (4 overs)	St Lawrence Ground, Canterbury; Umpires: NL Bainton and DJ Millns; Player of the match: SA Northeast (Kent)
Glamorgan won the toss and elected to bat; Points: Kent 2, Glamorgan 0				St Lawrence Ground, Canterbury; Umpires: NL Bainton and DJ Millns; Player of the match: SA Northeast (Kent)

6 July	Gloucestershire (H); 115/4 (16 overs)	v	Kent; 79/3 (9.1 overs)	Kent won by 7 wickets (with 5 balls remaining) (D/L method)
Scorecard	Gloucestershire (H); 115/4 (16 overs)	v	Kent; 79/3 (9.1 overs)	County Ground, Bristol; Umpires: SA Garratt and RT Robinson; Player of the match: Azhar Mahmood (Kent)
Scorecard	KJ O'Brien 43* (24); Azhar Mahmood 1/14 (3 overs)		JL Denly 23 (20); M Muralitharan 1/7 (2 overs)	County Ground, Bristol; Umpires: SA Garratt and RT Robinson; Player of the match: Azhar Mahmood (Kent)
Kent won the toss and elected to field; Match reduced to 16 overs per side due to rain Kent's innings was twice stopped due to further rain, finally resulting in a revised target of 76 runs in 10 overs; Points: Gloucestershire 0, Kent 2				County Ground, Bristol; Umpires: SA Garratt and RT Robinson; Player of the match: Azhar Mahmood (Kent)

8 July	Sussex; 159/6 (20 overs)	v	(H) Kent; 144/8 (20 overs)	Sussex won by 15 runs
Scorecard	Sussex; 159/6 (20 overs)	v	(H) Kent; 144/8 (20 overs)	St Lawrence Ground, Canterbury; Umpires: RT Robinson and JF Steele; Player of the match: MJ Prior (Sussex)
Scorecard	MJ Prior 89 (59); Wahab Riaz 3/22 (4 overs)		DI Stevens 65* (53); Umar Gul 3/26 (4 overs)	St Lawrence Ground, Canterbury; Umpires: RT Robinson and JF Steele; Player of the match: MJ Prior (Sussex)
Kent won the toss and elected to field; Points: Kent 0, Sussex 2				St Lawrence Ground, Canterbury; Umpires: RT Robinson and JF Steele; Player of the match: MJ Prior (Sussex)

14 July	Kent; 181/9 (20 overs)	v	(H) Surrey; 166 (19.2 overs)	Kent won by 15 runs
Scorecard	Kent; 181/9 (20 overs)	v	(H) Surrey; 166 (19.2 overs)	The Oval, Kennington, London; Umpires: NGB Cook and PJ Hartley; Player of the match: DI Stevens (Kent)
Scorecard	Azhar Mahmood 60 (40); JW Dernbach 2/23 (4 overs)		JJ Roy 53 (34); CK Langeveldt 3/37 (4 overs)	The Oval, Kennington, London; Umpires: NGB Cook and PJ Hartley; Player of the match: DI Stevens (Kent)
Kent won the toss and elected to bat; Points: Surrey 0, Kent 2				The Oval, Kennington, London; Umpires: NGB Cook and PJ Hartley; Player of the match: DI Stevens (Kent)

15 July	Kent; 183/3 (20 overs)	v	(H) Essex; 168/9 (20 overs)	Kent won by 15 runs
Scorecard	Kent; 183/3 (20 overs)	v	(H) Essex; 168/9 (20 overs)	County Ground, Chelmsford; Umpires: DJ Millns and G Sharp; Player of the match: DI Stevens (Kent)
Scorecard	JL Denly 69 (54); RS Bopara 1/19 (2 overs)		SB Styris 40 (27); DI Stevens 4/21 (4 overs)	County Ground, Chelmsford; Umpires: DJ Millns and G Sharp; Player of the match: DI Stevens (Kent)
Essex won the toss and elected to field; Points: Essex 0, Kent 2				County Ground, Chelmsford; Umpires: DJ Millns and G Sharp; Player of the match: DI Stevens (Kent)

=== Quarter-finals ===
6 August	Kent; 203/3 (20 overs)	v	(H) Leicestershire; 206/7 (19.2 overs)	Leicestershire won by 3 wickets (with 4 balls remaining)
Scorecard	Kent; 203/3 (20 overs)	v	(H) Leicestershire; 206/7 (19.2 overs)	Grace Road, Leicester; Umpires: JH Evans and RT Robinson; Player of the match: PA Nixon (Leicestershire)
Scorecard	Azhar Mahmood 91 (52); HF Gurney 1/34 (4 overs)		AB McDonald 53 (32); DI Stevens 2/26 (4 overs)	Grace Road, Leicester; Umpires: JH Evans and RT Robinson; Player of the match: PA Nixon (Leicestershire)
Leicestershire won the toss and elected to field; Leicestershire advanced				Grace Road, Leicester; Umpires: JH Evans and RT Robinson; Player of the match: PA Nixon (Leicestershire)

== Twenty20 tour match ==
26 August	Indians; 164/6 (20 overs)	v	(H) Kent; 159	Indians won by 5 runs
Scorecard	Indians; 164/6 (20 overs)	v	(H) Kent; 159	St Lawrence Ground, Canterbury; Umpires: JW Lloyds and BV Taylor
Scorecard	V Kohli 78 (53); JC Tredwell 2/18 (3 overs)		JL Denly 100 (68); RP Singh 2/36 (4 overs)	St Lawrence Ground, Canterbury; Umpires: JW Lloyds and BV Taylor
Kent won the toss and elected to field; Originally scheduled as a 50-over List A match, but after delays due to heavy rain it was decided to convert the match to a T20; DJ Bell-Drummond and AEN Riley made their Twenty20 debuts				St Lawrence Ground, Canterbury; Umpires: JW Lloyds and BV Taylor
