= James Goodman (cricketer) =

English cricketer

Personal information
- Full name: James Elliott Goodman
- Born: 19 November 1990 (age 35); Farnborough, London
- Batting: Right-handed
- Bowling: Right-arm medium
- Role: Batsman

Domestic team information
- Years: Team
- 2007–2011: Kent
- First-class debut: 28 June 2010 Kent v Pakistanis
- Last First-class: 19 June 2011 Kent v Middlesex
- List A debut: 16 July 2007 Kent v Sri Lanka A
- Last List A: 6 September 2009 Kent v Lancashire

Career statistics
Competition	First-class	List A
Matches	5	3
Runs scored	180	38
Batting average	22.50	38.00
100s/50s	0/2	0/0
Top score	59	26*
Balls bowled	83	–
Wickets	1	–
Bowling average	37.00	–
5 wickets in innings	0	–
10 wickets in match	0	–
Best bowling	1/37	–
Catches/stumpings	5/–	2/–
- Source: CricInfo, 1 August 2016

James Elliot Goodman (born 19 November 1990) is a former English professional cricketer who played for Kent County Cricket Club between 2007 and 2011. Playing as a top order batsman, Goodman represented England at age-group levels up to the under-19 team before retiring from professional cricket in 2011, aged 20, in order to pursue a career outside the game. Goodman was born in Farnborough in south-east London and attended St Olave's Grammar School in Orpington.

After playing age-group cricket for Kent and becoming a member of the county's cricket academy in 2005, Goodman made his Second XI debut in August 2006. He played for England under-16s in 2007 and toured Sri Lanka and India with England under-19s in 2008, the youngest player in the touring party.

Goodman made his full Kent debut in a limited-overs match against the touring Sri Lanka A team in 2007, going on to make his first-class cricket debut in June 2010 against a touring Pakistani team at Canterbury, scoring a half-century on debut. He was seen as a promising batsman who the county had "high hopes" for, with coach Paul Farbrace describing him as "an outstanding cricketer" after his first-class debut. He played his final match for Kent in June 2011, before turning down the offer of a new contract and retiring from professional cricket at the end of the 2011 season in order to go to university and pursue other career choices.
