= 2014 English cricket season =

County Championship
- Champions: Yorkshire
- Runners-up: Warwickshire
- Most runs: James Vince (1525)
- Most wickets: Mark Footitt (82)

Royal London One-Day Cup
- Champions: Durham
- Runners-up: Warwickshire
- Most runs: Jacques Rudolph (575)
- Most wickets: Jeetan Patel (23)

NatWest t20 Blast
- Champions: Birmingham Bears
- Runners-up: Lancashire Lightning
- Most runs: Jason Roy (677)
- Most wickets: Jeetan Patel (25)

PCA Player of the Year
- Adam Lyth

Wisden Cricketers of the Year
- Shikhar Dhawan; Charlotte Edwards; Ryan Harris; Chris Rogers; Joe Root

The 2014 English cricket season was the 115th in which the County Championship had been an official competition. It began on 1 April with a round of university matches, continued until the conclusion of a round of County Championship matches on 23 September. Three major domestic competitions were contested: the 2014 County Championship, the 2014 Royal London One-Day Cup and the 2014 NatWest t20 Blast. The Royal London One-Day Cup and the NatWest t20 Blast were newly created competitions as from the 2014 season, replacing the Clydesdale Bank 40 and the Friends Life t20.

During this season, two Test teams toured England. Sri Lanka competed early in the summer, with India having also toured later in the year.

== Roll of honour ==
Test series

- England v Sri Lanka: 2 Tests - Sri Lanka won 1–0.
- England v India: 5 Tests - England won 3–1.

ODI series

- England v Sri Lanka: 5 ODIs - Sri Lanka won 3–2.
- England v India: 5 ODIs - India won 3–1.

Twenty20 International series

- England v Sri Lanka: Only T20I - Sri Lanka won by 9 runs.
- England v India: Only T20I - England won by 3 runs.

County Championship

- Division One winners: Yorkshire
- Division One runners-up: Warwickshire
- Division Two winners: Hampshire
- Relegated from Division One: Lancashire and Northamptonshire
- Promoted from Division Two: Hampshire and Worcestershire

Royal London One-Day Cup

- Winners: Durham
- Runners-up: Warwickshire Bears

Natwest t20 Blast

- Winners: Birmingham Bears
- Runners-up: Lancashire Lightning

Minor Counties Championship

- Winners: Staffordshire
- Runners-up: Wiltshire

MCCA Knockout Trophy

- Winners: Devon
- Runners-up: Oxfordshire

Second XI Championship

- Winners: Leicestershire II

Second XI Trophy

- Winners: Leicestershire II

Second XI Twenty20

- Winners: Leicestershire II

Wisden Cricketers of the Year

- Shikhar Dhawan, Charlotte Edwards, Ryan Harris, Chris Rogers, Joe Root

PCA Player of the Year

- Adam Lyth

== County Championship ==
=== Divisions ===
Division One	Division Two
Durham	Derbyshire
Lancashire	Essex
Middlesex	Glamorgan
Northamptonshire	Gloucestershire
Nottinghamshire	Hampshire
Somerset	Kent
Sussex	Leicestershire
Warwickshire	Surrey
Yorkshire	Worcestershire

Icon
Team promoted from Division Two
Team relegated from Division One

=== Division One Standings ===
- Pld = Played, W = Wins, L = Losses, D = Draws, T = Ties, A = Abandonments, Bat = Batting points, Bowl = Bowling points, Ded = Deducted points, Pts = Points.

Team	Pld	W	L	T	D	A	Bat	Bowl	Ded	Pts
Yorkshire (C)	16	8	1	0	7	0	48	44	0	255
Warwickshire	16	8	4	0	4	0	47	43	0	238
Sussex	16	6	4	0	5	1	44	40	0	210
Nottinghamshire	16	6	6	0	4	0	50	40	0	206
Durham	16	5	4	0	7	0	42	42	0	199
Somerset	16	4	2	0	10	0	42	42	0	198
Middlesex	16	4	5	0	6	1	35	38	2	170
Lancashire (R)	16	3	6	0	7	0	30	41	0	154
Northamptonshire (R)	16	0	12	0	4	0	27	32	0	79

=== Division Two Standings ===
- Pld = Played, W = Wins, L = Losses, D = Draws, T = Ties, A = Abandonments, Bat = Batting points, Bowl = Bowling points, Ded = Deducted points, Pts = Points.

Team	Pld	W	L	T	D	A	Bat	Bowl	Ded	Pts
Hampshire (C)	16	7	1	0	8	0	50	38	0	240
Worcestershire (P)	16	8	3	0	5	0	37	47	0	237
Essex	16	7	2	0	7	0	37	45	0	229
Derbyshire	16	6	5	0	5	0	26	41	0	188
Surrey	16	4	5	0	7	0	43	44	3	183
Kent	16	4	6	0	6	0	35	42	0	171
Gloucestershire	16	4	5	0	7	0	28	36	0	163
Glamorgan	16	3	6	0	7	0	29	41	0	153
Leicestershire	16	0	10	0	6	0	36	42	0	108

== Royal London One-Day Cup ==
=== Group stage ===
Group A

Pos	Team	Pld	W	L	T	NR	Ded	Pts	NRR
1	Yorkshire Vikings	8	6	2	0	0	0	12	1.040
2	Essex Eagles	8	5	1	0	2	0	12	0.387
3	Gloucestershire	8	4	2	0	2	0	10	−0.016
4	Derbyshire Falcons	8	4	2	0	2	2	8 (Note: Derbyshire were docked 2 points before the start of season after preparing an unfit pitch in 2013.)	0.045
5	Leicestershire Foxes	8	3	4	0	1	0	7	−0.393
6	Northamptonshire Steelbacks	8	2	4	0	2	0	6	−0.277
7	Worcestershire	8	2	4	0	2	0	6	−0.328
8	Lancashire Lightning	8	2	5	0	1	0	5	−0.279
9	Hampshire	8	1	5	0	2	0	4	−0.569

Notes:

Group B

Pos	Team	Pld	W	L	T	NR	Ded	Pts	NRR
1	Nottinghamshire Outlaws	8	4	1	1	2	0	11	0.364
2	Kent Spitfires	8	4	1	1	2	0	11	0.245
3	Warwickshire Bears	8	4	3	0	1	0	9	0.343
4	Durham	8	4	3	0	1	0	9	0.212
5	Glamorgan	8	4	4	0	0	0	8	0.230
6	Somerset	8	3	4	1	0	0	7	0.067
7	Middlesex Panthers	8	3	4	0	1	0	7	−0.280
8	Sussex Sharks	8	3	5	0	0	0	6	−0.501
9	Surrey	8	1	5	1	1	0	4	−0.643

=== Knockout stage ===
Quarter-finals
Nottinghamshire Outlaws (H)	313/5
Derbyshire Falcons	228
Durham	237
Yorkshire Vikings (H)	206
Warwickshire Bears	271/7
Essex Eagles (H)	204
Kent Spitfires (H)	242
Gloucestershire	218

Semi-finals
Kent Spitfires	215/8
Warwickshire Bears (H)	219/4
Durham (H)	353/8
Nottinghamshire Outlaws	270

Final
Warwickshire Bears	165
Durham	166/7

== NatWest t20 Blast ==
=== Group stage ===
North Division

Pos	Team	Pld	W	L	T	NR	Ded	Pts	NRR
1	Lancashire Lightning	14	10	2	0	2	0	22	0.846
2	Nottinghamshire Outlaws	14	9	3	0	2	0	20	0.642
3	Worcestershire Rapids	14	8	4	0	2	0	18	0.480
4	Birmingham Bears	14	7	5	0	2	0	16	0.235
5	Yorkshire Vikings	14	6	5	0	3	0	15	0.588
6	Durham Jets	14	5	7	0	2	0	12	0.106
7	Northamptonshire Steelbacks	14	4	7	0	3	0	11	−0.899
8	Leicestershire Foxes	14	4	9	0	1	0	9	−0.552
9	Derbyshire Falcons	14	1	12	0	1	0	3	−1.406

South Division

Pos	Team	Pld	W	L	T	NR	Ded	Pts	NRR
1	Essex Eagles	14	10	4	0	0	0	20	0.401
2	Surrey	14	9	5	0	0	0	18	0.426
3	Hampshire	14	9	5	0	0	0	18	0.136
4	Glamorgan	14	6	5	1	2	0	15	0.145
5	Somerset	14	6	7	0	1	0	13	−0.107
6	Kent Spitfires	14	6	7	1	0	0	13	−0.229
7	Sussex Sharks	14	6	8	0	0	0	12	−0.022
8	Gloucestershire Gladiators	14	5	7	0	2	2	10	−0.362
9	Middlesex Panthers	14	2	11	0	1	0	5	−0.457

Deductions

- Gloucestershire were docked 2 points before the start of season after preparing an unfit pitch in 2013.

=== Knockout stage ===
Quarter-finals
Lancashire Lightning (H)	137/8
Glamorgan	136/7
Worcestershire Rapids	141/9
Surrey (H)	144/7
Birmingham Bears	197/2
Essex Eagles (H)	178/5
Nottinghamshire Outlaws (H)	197/2
Hampshire	198/5

Semi-finals
Birmingham Bears	194/4
Surrey	178/7
Lancashire Lightning	160/5
Hampshire	101

Final
Birmingham Bears	181/5
Lancashire Lightning	177/8

== See also ==
- Sri Lankan cricket team in England in 2014
- Indian cricket team in England in 2014
