= Sri Lankan cricket team in England in 2014 =

Sri Lanka in England in 2014
	Sri Lanka	England
- Dates: 13 May – 24 June 2014
Captains	Lasith Malinga (T20I); Angelo Mathews (Tests & ODIs)	Eoin Morgan (T20I); Alastair Cook (Tests & ODIs)

Test series
- Result: Sri Lanka won the 2-match series 1–0
Most runs	Kumar Sangakkara (342)	Joe Root (259)
Most wickets	Shaminda Eranga (11)	James Anderson (12)
- Player of the series: James Anderson (Eng); Angelo Mathews (SL)

One Day International series
- Results: Sri Lanka won the 5-match series 3–2
Most runs	Tillakaratne Dilshan (222)	Jos Buttler (172)
Most wickets	Sachithra Senanayake (9)	Chris Jordan (12)
- Player of the series: Lasith Malinga (SL)

Twenty20 International series
- Results: Sri Lanka won the 1-match series 1–0
Most runs	Thisara Perera (49)	Alex Hales (66)
Most wickets	Lasith Malinga (3)	Harry Gurney (2)
- Player of the series: Thisara Perera (SL)

The Sri Lanka national cricket team toured England from 13 May to 24 June 2014 for a Twenty20 International (T20I), five One Day Internationals (ODIs) and two Test matches against the England cricket team. They also played three one-day and one four-day tour matches against English county sides. Their England tour was preceded by a two-match ODI series against Ireland. Sri Lanka won the Test series 1–0 (the first time they had won a Test series with more than one match in England), the ODI series 3–2 and the one-off T20I.

== Squads ==
T20I		ODIs		Tests	
England	Sri Lanka	England	Sri Lanka	England	Sri Lanka
Eoin Morgan (c); Ian Bell; Ravi Bopara; Tim Bresnan; Jos Buttler (wk); Michael Carberry; Harry Gurney; Alex Hales; Chris Jordan; Moeen Ali; Joe Root; James Tredwell; Chris Woakes	Lasith Malinga (c); Lahiru Thirimanne (vc); Dinesh Chandimal (wk); Chathuranga de Silva; Tillakaratne Dilshan; Nuwan Kulasekara; Suranga Lakmal; Angelo Mathews; Ajantha Mendis; Kusal Perera (wk); Thisara Perera; Seekkuge Prasanna; Ashan Priyanjan; Sachithra Senanayake; Kithuruwan Vithanage	Alastair Cook (c); James Anderson; Gary Ballance; Ian Bell; Ravi Bopara; Tim Bresnan; Jos Buttler (wk); Michael Carberry; Harry Gurney; Chris Jordan; Eoin Morgan; Joe Root; James Tredwell; Chris Woakes	Angelo Mathews (c); Lahiru Thirimanne (vc); Dinesh Chandimal (wk); Chathuranga de Silva; Tillakaratne Dilshan; Mahela Jayawardene; Nuwan Kulasekara; Suranga Lakmal; Lasith Malinga; Ajantha Mendis; Kusal Perera (wk); Thisara Perera; Ashan Priyanjan; Kumar Sangakkara (wk); Sachithra Senanayake	Alastair Cook (c); James Anderson; Gary Ballance; Ian Bell; Stuart Broad; Chris Jordan; Moeen Ali; Liam Plunkett; Matt Prior (wk); Sam Robson; Joe Root; Chris Woakes	Angelo Mathews (c); Lahiru Thirimanne (vc); Dinesh Chandimal (wk); Shaminda Eranga; Rangana Herath; Mahela Jayawardene; Prasanna Jayawardene (wk); Dimuth Karunaratne; Nuwan Kulasekara; Dilruwan Perera; Nuwan Pradeep; Dhammika Prasad; Kumar Sangakkara; Kaushal Silva; Kithuruwan Vithanage; Chanaka Welegedara

== Tour matches ==
=== List A: Essex vs Sri Lankans ===
13 May 2014
14:00 (D/N)
Scorecard

Essex Eagles; 161/5 (21 overs)	v	Sri Lankans; 146/9 (21 overs)
Alastair Cook 71 (49); Suranga Lakmal 2/21 (5 overs)		Dinesh Chandimal 31 (25); Oliver Newby 3/36 (5 overs)

Essex won by 22 runs (D/L method)
County Ground, Chelmsford
Umpires: Mike Burns (Eng) and David Millns (Eng)

- Sri Lankans won the toss and elected to field.
- Rain after two overs of the Essex innings reduced the match to 21 overs per side.
- Matt Salisbury (Essex) made his List A debut.

=== List A: Kent vs Sri Lankans ===
16 May 2014
14:00 (D/N)
Scorecard

Sri Lankans; 301/7 (50 overs)	v	Kent Spitfires; 173 (36.3 overs)
Angelo Mathews 51 (59); Robert Joseph 4/58 (10 overs)		Alex Blake 60 (65); Suranga Lakmal 3/16 (7 overs)

Sri Lankans won by 128 runs
St Lawrence Ground, Canterbury
Umpires: Ismail Dawood (Eng) and Richard Kettleborough (Eng)

- Kent won the toss and elected to field.
- Charlie Hartley (Kent) made his List A debut.

=== Twenty20: Sussex vs Sri Lankans ===
18 May 2014
14:30
Scorecard

Sussex Sharks; 126/7 (20 overs)	v	Sri Lankans; 128/0 (9.1 overs)
Matt Machan 63 (45); Thisara Perera 2/13 (4 overs)		Tillakaratne Dilshan 73* (31)

Sri Lankans won by 10 wickets
County Ground, Hove
Umpires: Robert Bailey (Eng) and Martin Saggers (Eng)

- Sussex won the toss and elected to bat.
- Harry Finch (Sussex) made his Twenty20 debut.

=== First-class: Northamptonshire vs Sri Lankans ===
5–8 June 2014
Scorecard

Sri Lankans	v	Northamptonshire
558/8d (138 overs); Lahiru Thirimanne 156 (221); Steven Crook 3/98 (27 overs)		345 (87.1 overs); Rob Keogh 120 (201); Dhammika Prasad 4/68 (15.1 overs)
99/4d (31 overs); Kumar Sangakkara 45 (69); Graeme White 2/28 (10 overs)

Match drawn
County Ground, Northampton
Umpires: Steve O'Shaughnessy (Eng) and Paul Pollard (Eng)

- Sri Lankans won the toss and elected to bat
- No play was possible on Day 3 due to rain.
- Chad Barrett and James Kettleborough (both N'hants) made their first-class debuts.

== T20I series ==
=== Only T20I ===
20 May 2014
18:00 (D/N)
Scorecard

Sri Lanka; 183/7 (20 overs)	v	England; 174/7 (20 overs)
Thisara Perera 49 (20); Harry Gurney 2/26 (4 overs)		Alex Hales 66 (41); Lasith Malinga 3/28 (4 overs)

Sri Lanka won by 9 runs
The Oval, London
Umpires: Rob Bailey (Eng) and Michael Gough (Eng)
Player of the match: Thisara Perera (SL)

- England won the toss and elected to field.
- Michael Carberry, Harry Gurney (both Eng) and Kithuruwan Vithanage (SL) made their T20I debuts.

== ODI series ==
=== 1st ODI ===
22 May 2014
13:00 (D/N)
Scorecard

England; 247/6 (39 overs)	v	Sri Lanka; 144 (27.5 overs)
Gary Ballance 64 (72); Sachithra Senanayake 3/30 (8 overs)		Mahela Jayawardene 35 (41); Chris Jordan 3/25 (6 overs)

England won by 81 runs (D/L method)
The Oval, London
Umpires: Rob Bailey (Eng) and Chris Gaffaney (NZ)
Player of the match: Chris Jordan (Eng)

- Sri Lanka won the toss and elected to field.
- Rain after 20.4 overs of the England innings reduced the game to 39 overs per side, with Sri Lanka set a target of 259 runs to win on the Duckworth–Lewis method.
- Further rain during the Sri Lanka innings reduced their response to 32 overs with a revised target of 226 runs.

=== 2nd ODI ===
25 May 2014
10:30
Scorecard

Sri Lanka; 256/8 (50 overs)	v	England; 99 (26.1 overs)
Tillakaratne Dilshan 88 (101); Harry Gurney 3/59 (10 overs)		Eoin Morgan 40 (58); Sachithra Senanayake 4/13 (7.1 overs)

Sri Lanka won by 157 runs
Riverside Ground, Chester-le-Street
Umpires: Marais Erasmus (SA) and Tim Robinson (Eng)
Player of the match: Tillakaratne Dilshan (SL)

- England won the toss and elected to field.
- Eoin Morgan captained England in the absence of injured Alastair Cook.
- England's score of 99 was their sixth-lowest total in ODI cricket.

=== 3rd ODI ===
28 May 2014
14:00 (D/N)
Scorecard

Sri Lanka; 67 (24 overs)	v	England; 73/0 (12.1 overs)
Kumar Sangakkara 13 (23); Chris Jordan 5/29 (8 overs)		Ian Bell 41* (33)

England won by 10 wickets
Old Trafford, Manchester
Umpires: Chris Gaffaney (NZ) and Michael Gough (Eng)
Player of the match: Chris Jordan (Eng)

- England won the toss and elected to field.
- The start of the match was delayed by rain until 14:05, with no loss of overs.
- Sri Lanka's score of 67 was their third-lowest total in ODI cricket and England's victory was the fifth time they had won by 10 wickets in ODIs.

=== 4th ODI ===
31 May 2014
10:30
Scorecard

Sri Lanka; 300/9 (50 overs)	v	England; 293/8 (50 overs)
Kumar Sangakkara 112 (104); Harry Gurney 4/55 (10 overs)		Jos Buttler 121 (74); Lasith Malinga 3/52 (10 overs)

Sri Lanka won by 7 runs
Lord's, London
Umpires: Marais Erasmus (SA) and Ian Gould (Eng)
Player of the match: Jos Buttler (Eng)

- England won the toss and elected to field.
- Buttler's century was the fastest scored by an England player in ODI cricket, coming off 61 balls with nine fours and four sixes.

=== 5th ODI ===
3 June 2014
14:00 (D/N)
Scorecard

England; 219 (48.1 overs)	v	Sri Lanka; 222/4 (48.2 overs)
Alastair Cook 56 (85); Lasith Malinga 3/50 (9.1 overs)		Lahiru Thirimanne 60* (101); James Tredwell 2/30 (10 overs)

Sri Lanka won by 6 wickets
Edgbaston, Birmingham
Umpires: Chris Gaffaney (NZ) and Michael Gough (Eng)
Player of the match: Lahiru Thirimanne (SL)

- England won the toss and elected to bat.

== Test series ==
=== 1st Test ===
12–16 June 2014
Scorecard

England	v	Sri Lanka
575/9d (130.3 overs); Joe Root 200* (298); Nuwan Pradeep 4/123 (29 overs)		453 (138.4 overs); Kumar Sangakkara 147 (258); James Anderson 3/93 (31 overs)
267/8d (69 overs); Gary Ballance 104* (188); Rangana Herath 4/95 (23 overs)		201/9 (90 overs); Kumar Sangakkara 61 (168); James Anderson 4/25 (19 overs)

Match drawn
Lord's, London
Umpires: Billy Bowden (NZ) and Paul Reiffel (Aus)
Player of the match: Joe Root (Eng)

- Sri Lanka won the toss and elected to field.
- Moeen Ali, Chris Jordan and Sam Robson (all Eng) made their Test debuts.

=== 2nd Test ===
20–24 June 2014
Scorecard

Sri Lanka	v	England
257 (69.5 overs); Kumar Sangakkara 79 (147); Liam Plunkett 5/64 (15.5 overs)		365 (115.5 overs); Sam Robson 127 (253); Angelo Mathews 4/44 (16 overs)
457 (132.5 overs); Angelo Mathews 160 (249); Liam Plunkett 4/112 (29 overs)		249 (116.5 overs); Moeen Ali 108* (281); Dhammika Prasad 5/50 (22 overs)

Sri Lanka won by 100 runs
Headingley, Leeds
Umpires: Billy Bowden (NZ) and Steve Davis (Aus)
Player of the match: Angelo Mathews (SL)

- England won the toss and elected to field.
- Ian Bell (Eng) played in his 100th Test.
- Liam Plunkett (Eng) took his maiden five-wicket haul in Tests and his overall match figures of 9/176 were his best in Test cricket.
- Moeen Ali and Sam Robson (both Eng) scored their maiden centuries in Tests.

== Mankading incident ==
In the fifth ODI game, England batsman Jos Buttler was controversially run out backing-up at the non-striker's end by Sri Lankan bowler Sachithra Senanayake, a dismissal called Mankading. Senanayake had warned Buttler twice before in the same game about moving out of his crease, before he removed his bails and appealed to umpire Michael Gough. Speaking after the game, Sri Lankan captain Angelo Mathews defended the decision by saying "what we did was completely within the rules." England coach Peter Moores said he was "disappointed" in Mathew's decision. Former England captain Michael Vaughan said it was "no way to play the game", but another former captain, Michael Atherton, defended the decision saying "You see a lot of batsmen wandering aimlessly out of their ground. It's a good lesson for him – don't be dozy and keep your bat in your crease". Australian captain Michael Clarke said that "I think as long as the player's warned, it's in the rules so you can make whatever decision you want". Buttler's dismissal by Senanayake was the first instance of Mankading in international cricket since Peter Kirsten's innings was ended by Kapil Dev during an ODI between South Africa and India in 1992.
