= Orphans in Need =

British charity

Orphans in Need is a British charity dedicated to improving and empowering the lives of vulnerable orphans and widows. A UK based organisation, they operate throughout the world supporting 12,000 orphans in 14 countries.

In 2015, Orphans in Need won the British Muslim Awards Muslim Charity of the Year Award for its work in the field of humanitarian relief. This was recognised at a gala event in Birmingham.

English cricketer Moeen Ali supports the charity and works as their Global Ambassador. He helped it raise £260,000 for an orphanage during an event at the Institute of Directors in Pall Mall, London.

Lord Sheikh is a patron of Orphans in Need, along with his ex-wife Shaida Sheikh, and attend a number of events in this capacity throughout the year.
