= David Balcombe =

English cricketer (born 1984)

Personal information
- Full name: David John Balcombe
- Born: 24 December 1984 (age 41); City of London, England
- Nickname: Balcs
- Height: 6 ft 4 in (1.93 m)
- Batting: Right-handed
- Bowling: Right-arm medium-fast

Domestic team information
- Years: Team
- 2005–2007: Durham UCCE
- 2006–2014: Hampshire (squad no. 84)
- 2011: → Kent (loan)
- 2011: Berkshire

Career statistics
Competition	FC	LA	T20
Matches	67	14	3
Runs scored	958	10	3
Batting average	15.20	2.00	3.00
100s/50s	0/3	0/0	0/0
Top score	73	6	3
Balls bowled	11,278	519	30
Wickets	196	18	1
Bowling average	32.83	27.33	61.00
5 wickets in innings	9	0	0
10 wickets in match	2	0	0
Best bowling	8/71	4/38	1/23
Catches/stumpings	14/–	5/–	0/–
- Source: CricInfo, 30 January 2016

David John Balcombe (born 24 December 1984) is an English former cricketer who played primarily as a right-arm medium-fast bowler. Balcombe spent the majority of his professional career with Hampshire, but also played first-class cricket for Durham UCCE and Kent. In a career which spanned from 2005 to 2014, he took 196 wickets in first-class cricket.

== Early career ==
Balcombe was born in the City of London in December 1984. He was educated at St. Johns School in Leatherhead, before matriculating to Durham University. There, he played first-class cricket for Durham UCCE, making his debut against Somerset at Taunton in 2005. He played first-class cricket for the university until 2007, making nine appearances. He took 17 wickets at an average of 60.41 for the university, including a maiden five wicket haul with figures of 5 for 112 against Durham. While studying at Durham, Balcombe also made a single first-class appearance for a British Universities cricket team against the touring Sri Lankans at Fenner's in 2008.

Although he had been a member of Surrey's cricket academy, it was while playing for Durham UCCE that he was spotted by Hampshire's Giles White, who recommended him to the county. Having joined Hampshire in 2006, he made his debut for the county in a Twenty20 match against Middlesex at Southgate in the Twenty20 Cup. The following season, he made his first-class debut for Hampshire against Kent in the County Championship, in addition to making his debut in List A one-day cricket against Lancashire at Old Trafford in the NatWest Pro40. From 2008 to 2010, Balcombe struggled to establish himself in the Hampshire first team, playing seventeen first-class and eight one-day matches in that period. A back injury during the 2010 season ruled him out for the remainder of that season.

== Loan to Kent and return to Hampshire ==
During the following season, he was loaned to Kent on a one-month deal in July, which was later extended by an additional month. Balcombe headed their first-class bowling averages while at Kent, with 33 wickets at an average of 17.81 from five matches, which included four five wicket hauls and one ten-wicket haul in a match; while at Kent, he also made three one-day appearances, in addition to a single Twenty20 appearance against the touring Indians. On the back of his performances for Kent, there was speculation he would join the county permanently following his loan deal. Ultimately, he returned to Hampshire, who had been relegated in his absence. Balcombe also played minor counties cricket for Berkshire in 2011, making a single appearance apiece in the Minor Counties Championship and the MCCA Knockout Trophy.

Returning to Hampshire, he began the 2012 season by taking career best bowling figures in Hampshire's opening County Championship match against Gloucestershire, with figures of 8 for 71. In the 2012 season, he took 64 first-class wickets at an average of 26.10, with three five wicket hauls and one ten-wicket haul in a match. His performances in 2012 established him as the leader of Hampshire's attack. Balcombe was a replacement for Danny Briggs in Hampshire's squad for the 2012 Champions League Twenty20, playing in one match against Sialkot Stallions. However, he was unable to repeat his form the following summer, where hot and dry weather was more favourable to batsman. In 2014, he played just four first-class matches in the 2014 season, alongside a single one-day match against Sri Lanka A. With opportunities limited at Hampshire, Balcombe opted to signed a two-year deal with Surrey at the end of the 2014 season. In 52 first-class matches for Hampshire, he took 141 wickets at an average of 33.27. As a tailend batsman, he scored 701 runs at a batting average of 15.57, with two half centuries and a high score of 73.

Balcombe did not feature for the Surrey first team during his first year with the county, ultimately deciding to retire from professional cricket to take up a role with the Kevin Pietersen Foundation.
