= Neil Saker =

English cricketer (born 1984)

Neil Clifford Saker (born 20 September 1984) is a former English cricketer who played for Surrey. He is a right-hand batsman and right-arm medium pace bowler.

In July 2003 Saker made his first-class debut against India A, he scored 5 and bowled 15 wicketless overs. In September of the same season he made his county cricket debut against Essex, his maiden first-class wicket being that of Alastair Cook. At the end of the season he became the first Surrey Academy player to sign a full-time professional contract with the county.

After a season in the second team, Saker was used frequently in the first team in 2005 although twelve of his thirteen appearances came in the one-day format. He was given more first-class opportunities in 2006 and 2007 playing a total of 15 matches, taking 29 wickets at an average of 45.03. After playing a single one-day match in 2008 he was released at the end of the season.

During the 2010 Clydesdale Bank 40 domestic limited overs competition, Saker was added to the Unicorns squad to play against the regular first-class counties. The Unicorns were initially made up of 15 former county cricket professionals and 6 young cricketers looking to make it in the professional game. He appeared for Unicorns again in 2011 and also played for Kent in four first-class matches in the same season, but did not win a long-term contract.
