= Robbie Joseph =

English cricketer

Personal information
- Full name: Robert Hartman Joseph
- Born: 20 January 1982 (age 44); St John's, Antigua
- Batting: Right-handed
- Bowling: Right arm fast
- Role: Bowler

Domestic team information
- Years: Team
- 2004–2011: Kent
- 2008/09: Leeward Islands
- 2012: Leicestershire
- 2014: Kent

Career statistics
Competition	FC	LA	T20
Matches	69	38	9
Runs scored	605	46	1
Batting average	10.61	9.20	–
100s/50s	0/0	0/0	0/0
Top score	36*	15	1
Balls bowled	10,034	1,469	168
Wickets	188	43	10
Bowling average	32.40	30.06	21.30
5 wickets in innings	7	1	0
10 wickets in match	1	0	0
Best bowling	6/32	5/13	2/14
Catches/stumpings	14/–	7/–	3/–
- Source: Cricinfo, 19 July 2015

Robert Hartman Joseph (born 20 January 1982) is an Antiguan-born English cricket coach and former professional cricketer.

Joseph was born at St John's in Antigua in 1982 but completed his education in the United Kingdom, attending Sutton Valence School near Maidstone in Kent on a cricket scholarship in 1997, before completing a degree at St Mary's University College in Twickenham. He played club cricket for Folkestone Cricket Club in the kent Cricket League from the 1999 season and made his Second XI debut for Kent during the same season.

After playing for the Second XI for five seasons and playing a single first-class match in 2000 for a First-Class Counties XI against the New Zealand A team, Joseph made his professional debut for Kent County Cricket Club at the end of the 2005 season, having been cleared to play for them in April 2004. In 2008 he took 55 County Championship wickets and was selected to tour India with the England performance squad. He left Kent following the 2011 season and subsequently joined Leicestershire on a short-term deal. Joseph re-signed for Kent in April 2014 playing in six county championship matches during the season.

Joseph retired from top-class professional cricket after his second stint with Kent, playing club cricket with Hertford Cricket Club for a time before spending time as the performance coach of Cricket Namibia. In March 2018 he moved to Norfolk to become player-coach of Ashmanhaugh and Barton Wanderers Cricket Club, playing in Division Two of the Norfolk Alliance league. In 2022 he began working as the bowling coach for Gloucestershire County Cricket Club, spending two years with the team before moving to take up the same role with Kent in December 2023.
