= Ashley Shaw (cricketer) =

English cricketer

Personal information
- Full name: Stuart Ashley Shaw
- Born: 15 April 1991 (age 35); Crewe, Cheshire
- Batting: Right-handed
- Bowling: Left-arm fast-medium

Domestic team information
- Years: Team
- 2010–2011: Kent (squad no. 22)

Career statistics
Competition	FC	LA	T20
Matches	4	6	4
Runs scored	50	8	4
Batting average	25.00	4.00	–
100s/50s	0/0	0/0	0/0
Top score	22*	4*	3*
Balls bowled	487	162	60
Wickets	11	5	2
Bowling average	36.36	36.80	42.00
5 wickets in innings	1	0	0
10 wickets in match	0	0	0
Best bowling	5/118	3/26	1/10
Catches/stumpings	3/–	0/–	2/–
- Source: CricInfo, 9 September 2016

Stuart Ashley Shaw (born 15 April 1991) is a former English professional cricketer who played for Kent County Cricket Club. Shaw was born in Crewe in Cheshire and educated there at Shavington High School. He played as a left-arm seam bowler.

Having played youth cricket for Cheshire, Shaw spent six months in Australia over the 2009–10 winter before signing with Kent after a successful trial before the start of the 2010 season as an 18 year old. Shaw made his debut for Kent in the 2010 Friends Provident t20 against Middlesex in June 2010. He appeared in three more matches in the competition during 2010.

Shaw made his first-class cricket debut for Kent at the start of the 2011 season against Loughborough University. He played in three County Championship matches during the season, taking five wickets on his Championship debut against Derbyshire, the first Kent player to do so since Muttiah Muralitharan in 2003. He also played six times in List A cricket for Kent during the 2011 Clydesdale Bank 40.

Shaw missed the entire 2012 season after suffering from shin splints, an injury which was first an issue during the 2011 season. After three operations to correct the problem he spent two months playing for Mulgrave Cricket Club in Melbourne during the 2012–13 off-season and was retained by Kent for the 2013 season. He made two appearances for the Kent Second XI during 2013 and was released by the club at the end of the season.

Following his release by Kent, Shaw made Second XI appearances for Northants, Nottinghamshire and Hampshire during 2014, as well as playing for Unicorns during 2014 and 2015.
