= Paul Farbrace =

English cricketer (born 1967)

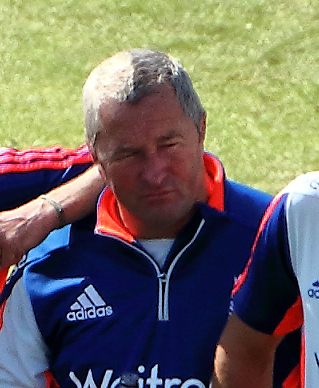

Personal information
- Born: 7 July 1967 (age 59); Ash, Kent, England
- Nickname: Farby
- Batting: Right-handed
- Role: Wicket-keeper

Domestic team information
- Years: Team
- 1987–1989: Kent
- 1990–1995: Middlesex
- FC debut: 6 May 1987 Kent v Pakistanis
- Last FC: 20 June 1995 Middlesex v Oxford University
- LA debut: 24 June 1987 Kent v Scotland
- Last LA: 16 July 1995 Middlesex v Warwickshire

Career statistics
Competition	First-class	List A
Matches	40	28
Runs scored	711	160
Batting average	18.23	11.42
100s/50s	0/4	0/0
Top score	79	26*
Balls bowled	31	0
Wickets	1	–
Bowling average	64.00	–
5 wickets in innings	0	–
10 wickets in match	0	–
Best bowling	1/64	–
Catches/stumpings	89/12	18/12
- Source: CricInfo, 2 December 2022

Paul Farbrace (born 7 July 1967) is the Director of Cricket at Lancashire County Cricket Club and a former professional cricketer.

He is also a former assistant coach to the England cricket team.

Farbrace, nicknamed "Farbie", was a wicket-keeper and right-handed batsman who represented Kent County Cricket Club and Middlesex County Cricket Club, playing in 40 first-class cricket matches and 28 List A cricket matches.

He enjoyed considerable success as head coach of the Sri Lankan Cricket Team, winning the ICC World Twenty20 2014 and Asia Cup 2014.

== Playing career ==
Farbrace played for Kent between 1987 and 1989 and for Middlesex from 1990 to 1995. His peak season in county cricket was 1991, when he played 20 first-class matches, made 54 dismissals, but he only averaged 14.81 with the bat. With an overall career batting average of 18.23 he only made another four appearances in first-class cricket, all of which were matches against universities, rather than County Championship matches. He was replaced as wicket-keeper by longstanding Middlesex player Keith Brown, who had played as a specialist batsman while Farbrace was in the side.

== Coaching career ==
=== Early career ===
Farbrace's early forays into a coaching career saw him spend two years coaching U15 football at Hampton School. Despite some mediocre results, Hampton's style of football was widely admired throughout the London Schools football scene. Following Hampton, he led England's Under 19 side, and the national women's team in 2000. Following a spell running the Kent Academy, he was appointed as the assistant coach to Trevor Bayliss for Sri Lanka in July 2007. He sustained a minor injury when the Sri Lankan team was attacked by terrorists in Lahore in March 2009.

=== Kent ===
He was named first-team coach of Kent for the 2010 season on 31 July 2009. Kent finished the season second bottom of the County Championship and were relegated to the second tier after earning promotion the previous season. Kent won three of their sixteen matches and finished with 151 points. In the Clydesdale Bank 40, Kent finished runners up in their group to Warwickshire, narrowly missing out on reaching the quarter finals. Kent failed to progress beyond the group stage of the domestic T20 competition, finishing seventh in their group.

Kent endured a difficult second season under Farbrace. In the first season back in Division two, they could only manage five wins, finishing the competition second bottom. They finished fourth in the Group stage in the Clydesdale Bank 40 competition. In the Twenty20 competition they qualified from the group, finishing third and earning a place in the quarter finals. However, they lost the quarter-final against Leicestershire in a high scoring game. At the end of the season Farbrace left his role and was replaced by Jimmy Adams.

Upon leaving Canterbury, Farbrace was appointed to the role of Second XI Coach for Yorkshire County Cricket Club, prior to the start of the 2012 domestic cricket season.

=== Sri Lanka ===
==== 2013/14 Pakistan ====
On 20 December 2013, he was named as the coach of Sri Lanka national cricket team. Sri Lanka won Farbrace's first game in charge in an ODI against Pakistan. However, they lost the next game by 113 runs. They lost the next game of the series but went on to win the last by two. Sri Lanka lost the series 3–2, although Farbrace was not in charge for Sri Lanka's first defeat. The first Test between the two sides was a high scoring match which ended in a draw. Sri Lanka won the second match of the series comprehensively, securing a 9 wicket victory. However, they lost the final match of the series by five wickets meaning that the three match series in the UAE ended 1–1.

==== 2014 Bangladesh ====
Sri Lanka secured a comprehensive victory over Bangladesh in the first Test between the two sides, winning by an innings and 248 runs. The second Test between the two sides ended in a draw, meaning Sri Lanka won the series 1–0, their first series victory under Farbrace. Sri Lanka won the two match T20 series 2–0 and then went on to win the three match ODI series 3–0. This meant that in the seven matches played between the two teams, Sri Lanka won six, continuing Farbrace's impressive start to the job.

==== 2014 Asia Cup ====
In the first match of the 2014 Asia Cup, Sri Lanka beat Pakistan by 12 runs. They narrowly won their next match against India by two wickets. After beating Afghanistan by 129 runs, Sri Lanka continued their winning run by beating Bangladesh by three wickets. After winning all their games, Sri Lanka met Pakistan in the tournament final, where they won by five wickets to secure their fifth Asia Cup title overall and their first since 2008.

==== 2014 Twenty20 World Cup ====
Sri Lanka won their first match of the campaign, beating South Africa by five runs. They continued their good start to the competition after comprehensively beating the Netherlands. They suffered their first defeat of the competition after losing to England, but bounced back to beat New Zealand by 59 runs to qualify for the qualify for the semi-finals. They played West Indies for a place in the final, and they won the game by 27 runs to set up a final against India. Sri Lanka won the match by six wickets to win the tournament for the first time in their history.

He resigned in April 2014 to become the assistant coach of England.

=== England ===
==== Assistant Coach under Moores ====
===== 2014 Sri Lanka =====
Working under Peter Moores, Farbrace's first opposition as England Assistant was against his old team, Sri Lanka. England narrowly lost the opening T20 match between the two sides in a high scoring match. England got off to a good start in the ODI series, winning a rain affected match after bowling out Sri Lanka for just 144. The next match saw England suffer a heavy defeat after they were bowled out for just 99. However, in the next game England bounced back, bowling Sri Lanka out for just 67 and winning the match by 10 wickets. They narrowly lost the fourth ODI by 7 runs, despite a quick fire century from Jos Buttler. England lost the final game of the series by six wickets to lose the series 3–2. However, England's performances had been well received and most pundits agreed that an improvement had been made following the disastrous tour of Australia. Moores' first test in charge ended in a draw, although England fell just one wicket short of winning the game. Stuart Broad took what he thought was the winning wicket with the penultimate ball of the match, only for the decision to be referred and overturned. The final match of the series was again a close affair, although this time it was Sri Lanka pressing for the win. Despite a century from Moeen Ali, England were bowled out in their second innings with the penultimate ball of the series, giving a Sri Lanka a 1–0 series win.

===== 2014 India =====
Following the defeat to Sri Lanka, pressure was put on England to make changes ahead of the series with India. However, no changes were made and England secured a draw in the first Test. However, they lost the second Test and pressure was put on captain Alastair Cook and Moores and Farbrace. Both men stayed on, and England turned the series around. Moores handed wicketkeeper Jos Buttler a Test debut, and the team went on to win the third Test to level the series at 1–1. England then secured a comfortable victory in the fourth Test to go 2–1 up, with Ian Bell and Alastair Cook returning to form. In the final match of the Test series, England again won to win the series 3–1 and hand Moores and Farbrace their first series win since returning to England. The ODI series was less successful. Moored handed a debut to Alex Hales, although England went on to lose the first three matches of the series. Moores again stood by captain Alistair Cook, and England went on to win the final match of the series. They also won the only T20 match between the two sides to end the series on a high.

===== 2014/15 Build up to World Cup =====
England travelled to Sri Lanka for a seven match ODI series. They lost the first two matches to go 2–0 down in the series, but won the third match. After losing the next match, England again won to keep the series alive at 3–2. However, they were comprehensively beaten in the final two matches of the series which led to questions being asked again of Alistair Cook. Throughout the tour Moores had remained loyal to Cook, but after the final game he hinted that there may be changes. Cook was later removed as ODI captain, with Eoin Morgan taking over.

The tri-series against India and Australia marked Morgan's first series as skipper. Morgan hit a century in the opening match, although England were beaten by Australia. England improved in the following match against India, securing a comfortable win. However, they again suffered defeat to Australia meaning that they had to beat India in the final game to qualify for the final. They did so, but again suffered defeat to Australia when they met in the final. Despite finishing as runners up, the consensus was that England had improved and were now in a stronger position ahead of the World Cup.

===== 2015 World Cup =====
England's World Cup campaign got off to a poor start as they suffered a 111 runs defeat at the hands of Australia. They suffered another humiliating defeat in their next match as lost to New Zealand by eight wickets. England relieved the pressure on them by securing a comfortable win against Scotland, but another heavy defeat, this time nine wickets against Sri Lanka, meant that England had to win their final two games to qualify. Defeat against Bangladesh ended any hopes of qualification, which led to suggestions that the current England coaching team could be replaced. However, Moores and Farbrace were backed by Paul Downton to rebuild the side, with Moores himself saying he was committed to the job. England won their final match against Afghanistan by nine wickets.

===== 2015 West Indies =====
Moores remained in charge of England for their tour of West Indies despite the resignation of the man who appointed him, Paul Downton. In the first match of the series, England got off to a good start, posting 399 in the first innings and then bowling the West Indies out for 295. However, they were unable to force a result and the match ended in a draw, with the West Indies saving the match. England won the second match of the series following a good batting display in the first innings. They bowled the West Indies out for 307 in the second innings, and then won the game by nine wickets thanks to contributions from Alistair Cook and Gary Ballance. Despite this, England lost the final match of the series after setting the West Indies a small target to chase in their second innings after an England batting collapse. The West Indies won the match by five wickets to draw the series 1–1.

After the series Moores played down talk for the need of an enquiry, but rumours persisted that Moores' job was in danger. Moores remained in charge for the ODI match against Ireland, which was abandoned due to rain. After Andrew Strauss was appointed Director of Cricket, Moores was sacked as England coach and replaced by his assistant, Paul Farbrace.

==== Interim Coach ====
Following the appointment of Andrew Strauss as Director of Cricket, Peter Moores was sacked as coach. However, Farbrace stayed on, acting as Interim head coach for the series against New Zealand. The first squad selected under his stewardship was similar to Moores' final squad, with Adam Lyth being confirmed as the man to replace the retiring Jonathan Trott.

England won their first Test under Farbrace in a thrilling game against New Zealand. However, they went on to lose the second Test and the two match series ended in a 1–1 draw. England had several new players in the squad for the ODI series, but the team soon clicked and put in an impressive performance in the first game, with England scoring 408. New Zealand won the next two games in the series to lead 2–1. However, England won the fourth game in convincing fashion to set up a decider in the final match of the series. England went on to win it by three wickets to win the series 3–2. England also won the only T20 match between the two sides, achieving victory by a margin of 56 runs.

==== Assistant Coach under Bayliss ====
When new coach Trevor Bayliss was appointed, it was announced that Farbrace would work under him as assistant coach as he had done previously with Sri Lanka.

===== 2015 Australia =====
Farbrace worked under Bayliss for England for the first time in the 2015 Ashes series. Going into the series, England were underdogs. Ahead of the first Test, there were no changes to the England squad and the same team was selected that played in the New Zealand Test series, which Farbrace had been in charge of. England won the first Test by 169 runs, with Joe Root in particular impressing. In the second Test England suffered a heavy defeat by 405 runs after a batting collapse in the second innings. England made two changes for the third Test, with Jonny Bairstow replacing the out of form Gary Ballance and Steven Finn replacing the injured Mark Wood. England went on to win the game by eight wickets after dismissing Australia for 136 in their first innings. James Anderson took 6–47 in the Australian first innings, while Steven Finn took 6–79 in their second innings. Ahead of the fourth Test James Anderson was ruled out through injury and replaced by Mark Wood. England bowled Australia out for just 60 in their first innings, with Stuart Broad taking 8–15. After Joe Root scored a century in England's reply, Ben Stokes took six Australian second innings wickets as England won by an innings and 78 runs. With the Ashes already won, England named an unchanged team, with Anderson still injured. Australia made a big total in their first innings, and England were dismissed cheaply in theirs. Although England batted better when following in, Australia won the game by an innings and 48 runs. Despite this, England won the Ashes 3–2 and regained the urn. In the limited overs series, England won the first T20 match between the sides. Joe Root was rested for the ODI series and James Taylor replaced him at three. The ODI series got off to a bad start for England, with them losing the first two games. However, they won the third match by 93 runs and won the fourth by three wickets. England lost the final match of the series to lose it 3–2.

===== Pakistan 2015 =====
Adam Lyth was replaced as opener for the series against Pakistan, with Moeen Ali being moved up the order to replace him. England drew the first game with debutant Adil Rashid helping to almost force a result for England. England lost the next two games of the series, by 178 runs and 127 runs. The decision to move Moeen Ali up the order did not work out, and England's spinners didn't offer a genuine threat throughout the series. Despite the setback, England continued their progression which started under Farbrace in limited overs cricket. Despite losing the opening match of the ODI series, they recovered to win it 3–1, winning the last three games by a margin of 95 runs, 6 wickets and 84 runs respectively. While England had modified their approach on the sub continent, they still played an aggressive brand of cricket, scoring 355 in the final game of the series. With the T20 World Cup approaching, England experimented in their selections for the three T20 internationals. Sam Billings and James Vince both came into the side and impressed, with Vince being named man of the series, while Chris Jordan returned to the side and demonstrated his credentials as a death bowler, bowling the Super Over in the final game of the series to help England win it 3–0, and make it six victories on the bounce.

===== South Africa 2015/16 =====
England again changed opener for their series against South Africa, with Alex Hales opening and Moeen Ali moving back down the order. Nick Compton also returned to the side. England won the first game by 241 runs, after passing 300 in both innings, before a fit again Steven Finn helped bowl South Africa out for 174 in their second innings. After a high scoring second match, in which Ben Stokes and Jonny Bairstow both hit centuries, England won the third game of the series thanks to a superb bowling display from Stuart Broad. The victory gave England an unassailable 2–0 series lead with one game left to play. England lost the final game of the series after a batting collapse in the second innings. Despite winning the first two ODIs in convincing fashion, England lost the final three games of the series to lose the ODI series 3–2. However, Alex Hales' form with the bat was a major positive for England as was the emergence of Reece Topley in the bowling unit. England lost both of the T20 games they played to mean they ended the tour with five straight defeats. They were thrashed by nine wickets in the final game of the series, and their last game before the T20 World Cup, with England's seam bowlers being unable to cope with AB de Villiers, Quintin de Kock or Hashim Amla.

===== 2016 T20 World Cup =====
Farbrace had previously won the World T20 with Sri Lanka, while Trevor Bayliss and Otis Gibson had also previously won the tournament as coaches. England lost the first game against the West Indies, and looked to be heading for defeat against South Africa, but Jason Roy and Joe Root ensured they chased down 230 for victory. It looked like a collapse would be on the cards against Afghanistan, but Moeen Ali and David Willey lead the recovery to help England to a 15 run victory. After beating Sri Lanka, England qualified for the semi-finals against New Zealand. Good death bowling from David Willey and Chris Jordan saw England restrict their opponents to 153–8, and they went on to win the match by seven wickets. England lost the final after Ben Stokes was hit for four consecutive sixes, although it was still a big improvement from England and their exciting brand of cricket was generally praised.

===== 2016 Sri Lanka =====
Following their win over South Africa, England went into the series against Sri Lanka on a high. The only change to the Test side was enforced, with James Vince replacing James Taylor, who had retired for health reasons. England won the first Test by an innings and 88 runs, with James Anderson taking ten wickets in the match. England followed this up with another convincing victory, this time winning by 9 wickets after a Moeen Ali century and further impressive bowling performances from James Anderson and Stuart Broad. The final game was rain affected an ended in a draw, with England winning the series 2–0. England continued their attacking brand of cricket in the ODI series, with the first game of the series ending in a tie after both sides scored 286 from their 50 overs. England won the next match by 10 wickets after a record breaking opening stand from Alex Hales and Jason Roy, before the third game finished in a draw due to rain. England won the fourth game by six wickets, with Jason Roy scoring yet another century, before England won the final game of the series after a strong bowling performance, which included four wickets for David Willey, meaning they won the series 3–0. The only T20I between the two sides saw England debuts handed to Liam Dawson and Tymal Mills. Dawson was particularly impressive, tasking figures of 3–27, before an unbeaten 73 from Jos Buttler saw England record an eight wicket victory.

===== 2016 Pakistan =====
Going into the Test series against Pakistan, England made no major changes to their Test side, although Jake Ball was given a debut to replace the injured James Anderson, while Gary Ballance was bought back into the side. England lost the first game of the series by 75 runs. However, they performed much better in the next game and secured a convincing 330 run win over the tourists after strong performances from Joe Root and Alastair Cook. A good comeback saw England win the third Test despite being over 100 runs behind after the first innings. England led 2–1 going into the final Test. However, they lost the final game of the series after Pakistan scored 542 and then dismissed England for 253 in the second innings, and went on to secure a 10 wicket victory to level the series at 2–2. In the ODI series England again kept a similar squad, and secured comfortable victories over Pakistan in the first two matches. In the third match, England set a world record score of 444/3 thanks to a record high score from Alex Hales and strong contributions from Eoin Morgan, Joe Root and Jos Buttler. England won the fourth ODI but lost the final match of the series, meaning they won the series 4–1. England lost the only T20I between the sides by nine wickets after struggling with both bat and ball.

===== 2016 Bangladesh =====
Several new players were called up to the side for the tour of Bangladesh. Ben Duckett and Haseeb Hameed both received their first call-ups, with Zafar Ansari, Gareth Batty and Adil Rashid also included. Eoin Morgan and Alex Hales both pulled out of the tour due to safety concerns. England started off the tour well, beating Bangladesh by 21 runs in the first ODI, with Jake Ball taking five wickets on his ODI debut. However, they lost the next game by 34 runs. In the final match of the series, England won by four wickets to seal a 2–1 series win. England won the first Test between the sides by 22 runs, with Ben Stokes impressing for England. In the second match, England built a lead in the first innings, but a collapse saw them lose the match by 108 runs and the series finished 1–1.

===== 2016–17 India =====
England kept the same squad that faced Bangladesh ahead of the Test series against India. England performed well in the first Test, almost the game having played well with the bat. Four players, Alistair Cook, Joe Root, Ben Stokes and Moeen Ali scored centuries for England in the match. However, they were beaten soundly by 246 in the second game, despite James Anderson and Stuart Broad chipping in with wickets. Jos Buttler returned to the Test side for the third Test, but England again struggled, having been dismissed for 283 in the first innings before India scored 417. Haseeb Hameed batted well for England in their second innings, although India chased down their small target to win by eight wickets. Following the game, Hameed was ruled out for the rest of the series through injury along with Zafar Ansari, resulting in Keaton Jennings and Liam Dawson being called up to the squad. Jennings scored a century on his debut in the next Test, but England's bowlers again struggled, with India scoring 631 to win the match by an innings and 36 runs. In the final Test, England posted 477 in their first innings, but India again dominated with the bat, scoring 759/7. England collapsed on the final day, and India won by an innings and 75 runs to win the series 4–0.

England kept a similar squad to the one that was selected for Bangladesh for the ODI series against India. They lost the first match by 3 wickets despite scoring 350/7, and then lost the second game by 15 runs after India scored 381/6. They won the final match of the series, their first on tour as they secured a five run victory after scoring 321/8, to put an end to six consecutive defeats, although they lost the series 2–1. England altered their bowling line up for the T20I series, bringing in Chris Jordan and Tymal Mills. They won the first match by seven wickets. However, they lost the second match narrowly by five runs. In the final match of the series England collapsed and were bowled out for 127 as India won by 75 to win the series 2–1, meaning England suffered defeat in all three series between the sides.

===== 2017 West Indies =====
England toured the West Indies for a three match ODI series. England kept the same that had been used against India. They won the first game by 45 runs after making 296–6 before bowling out the West Indies for 251. The second game was tighter, but an impressive partnership between Joe Root and Chris Woakes saw England chase down their target of 226 to win by four wickets. The final game of the series was more convincing for England, with them making a score of 328 following centuries from Joe Root and Alex Hales, before bowling the West Indies out for 142, winning game by 186 runs and the series 3–0.

=== Warwickshire ===
In February 2019 it was announced that Farbrace would be leaving his England post to join Warwickshire as their Sporting Director.

He left the club following the end of the 2022 season. .

=== Sussex ===
Farbrace was appointed Head Coach of struggling Sussex on 2 December 2022. They had finished the most recent County Championship season in 7th place out of 8 in Division 2, earning just one win under Ian Salisbury.

In 2023, Farbrace's first season with Sussex, the club finished 3rd in Division 2 of the County Championship, winning 3 games. The team's Men's Championship Player of the Year was Fynn Hudson-Prentice.

In 2024, Sussex were promoted as champions, winning 8 games out of 14. The title was sealed in a draw at home against Middlesex, thanks to centuries from Tom Haines and James Coles. The team's red-ball player of the year was John Simpson, who scored five centuries across the season at an average of 74.81.

In 2025, Sussex finished 4th in Division 1, with 4 wins and 4 draws out of 14. The team's player of the season was James Coles.

Ahead of the 2026 season, it was announced that due to financial mismanagement and "sustained operating losses", the club were to be deducted 12 points and placed under a salary cap for the next three seasons. Despite this, Farbrace's team finished 3rd in Division 1, just 10 points behind second-placed Somerset.

On 6th July 2026, it was announced that Paul Farbrace was to leave his role as Head Coach, and move to a part-time Director of Cricket role at Sussex. He said "I wasn't ready to say goodbye to this group of players or to everything we've worked so hard to build together. This role allows me to continue supporting the players and staff across the Club as we work towards the goals we all want to achieve."

On 6th October 2026, it was announced that Farbrace would in fact be leaving Sussex altogether, to become Director of Cricket at Lancashire. This was described by BBC Radio Sussex correspondent Adrian Harms as "a hammer blow".

== Personal life ==
Farbrace is now married to Sandra, the mother of England cricketer Ollie Robinson.
