= Sam Robson =

English cricketer (born 1989)

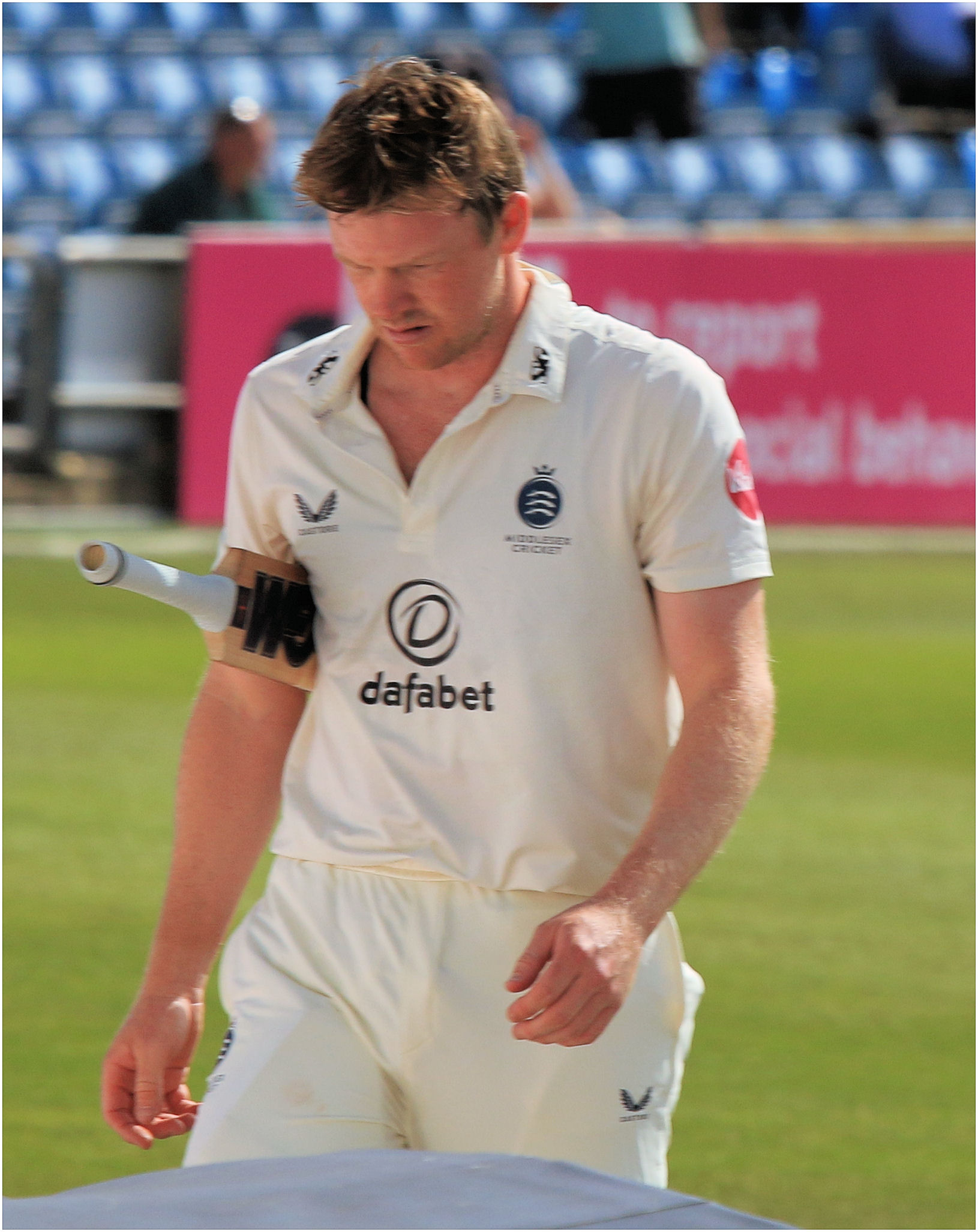
- Robson in 2024

Personal information
- Full name: Sam David Robson
- Born: 1 July 1989 (age 37); Paddington, New South Wales, Australia
- Batting: Right-handed
- Bowling: Right-arm leg break
- Role: Batsman
- Relatives: Angus Robson (brother)

International information
- National side: England
- Test debut (cap 664): 12 June 2014 v Sri Lanka
- Last Test: 15 August 2014 v India

Domestic team information
- Years: Team
- 2008–present: Middlesex (squad no. 12)

Career statistics
Competition	Test	FC	LA	T20
Matches	7	239	59	7
Runs scored	336	14,632	2,215	128
Batting average	30.54	37.32	41.01	25.60
100s/50s	1/1	38/56	4/14	0/1
Top score	127	253	169*	60
Balls bowled	–	1,091	320	–
Wickets	–	21	10	–
Bowling average	–	37.00	35.70	–
5 wickets in innings	–	0	0	–
10 wickets in match	–	0	0	–
Best bowling	–	4/46	2/12	–
Catches/stumpings	5/–	236/–	30/–	3/–
- Source: ESPNcricinfo, 27 September 2026

Sam David Robson (born 1 July 1989) is an Australian-born English cricketer who plays for Middlesex County Cricket Club.

He is a right-handed batsman and occasional legbreak bowler. Born to an Australian father and English mother, Robson played under-19 cricket for Australia but qualified for England in August 2013.

In 2012, he became the first batsman to score a first-class hundred in England in the month of March.

== Career ==
Born 1 July 1989 in Paddington, New South Wales, Robson was educated at Marist College Pagewood before moving to Marcellin College Randwick. Robson had also attended Sydney Boys High School in Year 10, playing in the school's 1st XI in the GPS. His Australian father, Jim Robson, played for Worcestershire County Cricket Club against Ireland in 1979 and now works at the Sydney Cricket Ground. Sam's younger brother Angus also played first-class cricket.

Robson played cricket for New South Wales Under-17s, New South Wales Under-19s, the Australia Under-19 cricket team, the University of New South Wales, and Eastern Suburbs. He left Sydney after school as he was stuck behind Usman Khawaja, his schoolmate Phillip Hughes, and others in the NSW pecking order. He started to play for the Middlesex 2nd XI in 2008, and played his first List A match for Middlesex against Worcestershire in the NatWest Pro40 League on 14 September 2008. He played Grade cricket in Sydney in 2008–9.

Robson made his first-class debut in June 2009, scoring 43 and 23 for Middlesex against Essex at Chelmsford. He is a "wiry Australian who loves the circuit" and, according to Cricinfo's Mark Pennell, "With an English mother and a UK passport to his name, he looks to be a decent find." In his debut season of 2009, he recorded his maiden first-class century, opening the batting against Essex at Lord's in August. He was eventually out for 110

On 31 March 2012, on the first day of a three-day match against Durham MCC University, Robson made cricket history by becoming the first batsman to score a first-class hundred in England in the month of March.

On 18 April 2016, Robson scored a career-best 231 against Warwickshire at Lord's in the first game of the 2016 County Championship. He went on to appear in 14 matches as Middlesex won the Division One title, averaging 44.95. He bettered his top score against Sussex in September 2021, scoring 253.

Having made over 250 appearances for the club, Robson was awarded a testimonial year by Middlesex in 2025.

== International qualification ==
Robson has British and Australian nationality but played for Australia in nine Under-19 ODIs against Pakistan in April and October 2007. He was expected to qualify for England by residency in the summer of 2014 but achieved it unexpectedly early, in August 2013. In order to play for Middlesex on his British passport he signed a document stating his desire and intention to play for and qualify for England but by 2013 had not committed to either Australia or England at senior level. His captain at Middlesex, fellow Aussie Chris Rogers, said that Robson considered a return to Australia but "I think his future is in England", while the Middlesex director of cricket Angus Fraser said in August 2013 "I'm pretty sure that it'll be playing for England". Robson has expressed a clear commitment to Middlesex as he views the County Championship as the best tournament for his development as a cricketer, but under current rules as a dual national he would be treated as an Australian player if he played for an Australian state side and thus would be treated as an overseas player at Middlesex. Cricket Australia changed their rules in August 2013 to allow dual nationals to be treated as overseas players in Australia, so that he could play for NSW in the 2013–14 Sheffield Shield season without compromising his status at Middlesex, which could lead to him playing for the Australian Test side. However, in June 2014 he was named in the England Test squad for their series against Sri Lanka.

== International career ==
Robson has played in seven Test matches for England, all in 2014. He was named in the England squad to face Sri Lanka on their tour of England in June, making his debut in the first Test, scoring 1 and 19. In his second international he scored his first and only Test cricket century, making 127 runs in England's first innings.

Robson retained his place for the first Test against India, making a half century in the match. He went on to play in the other four matches of the tour, although he was not able to make more than 37 runs in an innings.
