= Moeen Ali =

English cricketer (born 1987)

Moeen Ali OBE
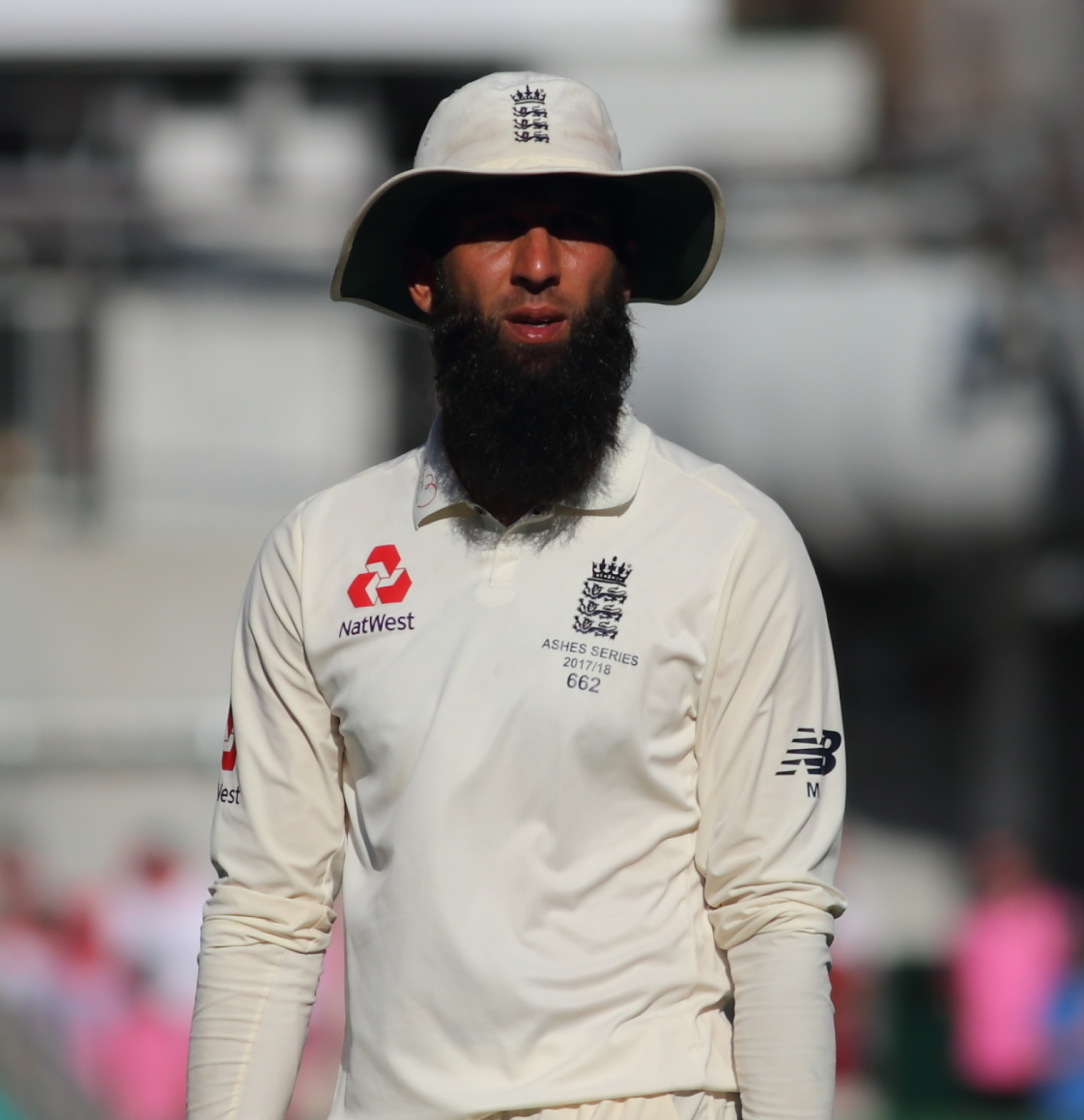
- Moeen Ali during the 2017/18 Ashes

Personal information
- Full name: Moeen Munir Ali
- Born: 18 June 1987 (age 39); Sparkhill, Birmingham, England
- Height: 1.83 m (6 ft 0 in)
- Batting: Left-handed
- Bowling: Right-arm off break
- Role: All-rounder
- Relatives: Kadeer Ali (brother); Kabir Ali (cousin); Isaac Mohammed (nephew)

International information
- National side: England (2014–2024)
- Test debut (cap 662): 12 June 2014 v Sri Lanka
- Last Test: 27 July 2023 v Australia
- ODI debut (cap 232): 28 February 2014 v West Indies
- Last ODI: 11 November 2023 v Pakistan
- ODI shirt no.: 18 (formerly 57)
- T20I debut (cap 66): 11 March 2014 v West Indies
- Last T20I: 27 June 2024 v India
- T20I shirt no.: 18 (formerly 57)

Domestic team information
- Years: Team
- 2005–2006, 2023–2025: Warwickshire (Note: Only clubs that Ali has played for more than one season are included in this list)
- 2007–2022: Worcestershire
- 2018–2020: Royal Challengers Bangalore
- 2021–2024: Chennai Super Kings
- 2021–2024: Birmingham Phoenix
- 2022–2024: Comilla Victorians
- 2024–2025: Guyana Amazon Warriors

Career statistics
Competition	Test	ODI	T20I	FC
Matches	68	138	92	202
Runs scored	3,094	2,355	1,229	11,514
Batting average	28.12	24.27	21.18	36.09
100s/50s	5/15	3/6	0/7	20/70
Top score	155*	128	72*	250
Balls bowled	12,610	5,988	999	25,340
Wickets	204	111	51	391
Bowling average	37.31	47.84	27.13	38.24
5 wickets in innings	5	0	0	12
10 wickets in match	1	0	0	2
Best bowling	6/53	4/46	3/24	6/29
Catches/stumpings	40/–	48/–	22/–	120/–
Medal record
Men's Cricket
Representing England
ICC Cricket World Cup
Winner	2019 England and Wales
ICC T20 World Cup
Winner	2022 Australia
Runner-up	2016 India
- Source: ESPNcricinfo, 20 July 2024

Moeen Munir Ali OBE (born 18 June 1987) is an English cricketer, who was formerly vice-captain of England in limited overs cricket. He played for England cricket team between 2014 and 2024. In domestic cricket he represents Yorkshire, having previously played for Worcestershire and Warwickshire. He has also played in multiple Twenty20 leagues.

Ali made his debuts in all three formats in 2014. He was part of the England teams that won the 2019 Cricket World Cup and 2022 T20 World Cup.

In 2018 Ali published his autobiography 'Moeen'.

On 7 June 2023, Ali announced he was coming out of retirement for England Test team following an injury to first choice spinner Jack Leach, just ahead of the 2023 Ashes Series. He fully retired from Test cricket at the end of the Ashes series. He finally announced his international retirement on 8 September 2024.

== Early life ==
Ali was born in Sparkhill, Birmingham. He is of Kashmiri and English descent; his grandfather migrated to England from Mirpur, Kashmir, while his grandmother, Betty Cox, was a white Briton. He can understand Urdu and Punjabi. He became known fondly as "the beard that's feared" while playing for Worcestershire. Ali's father worked as a taxi driver, and as a psychiatric nurse. He grew up on the same street as fellow cricketers Kabir Ali (his first cousin), Naqash Tahir, and Rawait Khan. His brothers Kadeer and Omar are also cricketers.

== Career ==
=== Warwickshire ===
Ali signed for Warwickshire aged just 15, hitting a half-century for the county's Second XI a few days before his 16th birthday. After more games at this level in 2004, and a first outing for England Under-19s against their Bangladeshi counterparts he spent the succeeding winter playing for the Under-19s on their tour of India.

2005 saw Ali make his first-class debut, against Cambridge University in May. He impressed with the bat, making 57 not out in his only innings, and sent down two overs for 15 runs. Playing that summer against Sri Lankan Under-19s, he starred in the final "Test" by making 52 not out and 100 not out (the latter innings from 56 balls) and claiming seven wickets. He was then selected for the 2006 Under-19 Cricket World Cup, which was held in Sri Lanka, and was immediately promoted to captain by coach Andy Pick. He made three half-centuries in the tournament, and took seven wickets.

Ali received additional opportunities for his county in 2006, playing his first List A games. The first of these came against Derbyshire, where he dismissed Steffan Jones to claim his maiden first-team wicket. He also took his first wickets in first-class cricket, and his first three victims were all Test players: Stuart Law, Dominic Cork and Dave Mohammed. With the bat he scored 68 on his County Championship debut against Nottinghamshire, then equalled that score against Durham.

Ali's opportunities were somewhat limited, however, and Alex Loudon took his place in the team. In July 2006, with the expiry of his Warwickshire contract only months away, Ali brushed off rumours of a move to Worcestershire, saying "I don't know anything about it", but in September it was announced that Ali would indeed be leaving to join that county. The player himself said that he had been impressed by Worcestershire and felt it gave him the best prospects of furthering his career.

=== Worcestershire ===
He made his debut for Worcestershire in their ten-wicket win over Loughborough UCCE on 25 April 2007.

Ali's highest first-class score of 250, scored against Glamorgan at New Road, featured a partnership of 219 with Matt Pardoe.

At the end of the 2010 season Worcestershire secured promotion to the first division of the County Championship. After he was overlooked by the England Lions and England Performance Programme at the end of the 2010 English season, Moeen opted to play club cricket in Bangladesh at the suggestion of Bangladesh all-rounder Shakib Al Hasan. Shakib played for Worcestershire as their overseas player in 2010 and the link with the club led to Moeen representing Mohammedan Sporting Club in the Ispahani Premier Division.

==== 2011 season ====
During the 2011 season, Moeen spent three weeks as Worcestershire's acting captain while the usual club captain, Daryl Mitchell, was injured. Though he had captained England Under-19s, it was the first time he filled the role for his county. As he was inexperienced, Moeen approached senior players Vikram Solanki and Ben Scott for advice.

Pakistan off-spinner Saeed Ajmal was Worcestershire's overseas player for a short time in 2011 and while at the club he encouraged Moeen to try bowling the doosra. Moeen had to wait until July before registering his first century of the season, and his first since September the previous year. His innings of 158 runs from 244 balls against Somerset was in vain as Worcestershire succumbed to an innings defeat. The following month Moeen twice scored a century in the Clydesdale Bank 40 only for Worcestershire to lose, against Sussex and the Netherlands. In the first match against Sussex he passed his previous best score of 136 in List A cricket, scoring 158 runs from 92 balls. In Worcestershire's first season back in the first division, Moeen scored 930 runs in the County Championship, making him the club's second-highest run scorer in the competition behind Solanki. Moeen average 33.21 runs per innings and scored a single century. On the back of his performances for Worcestershire, Moeen was included in the 13-man England Development squad which trained in late 2011.

==== 2012 season ====
In February 2012, before the start of the English season, Worcestershire's director of cricket Steve Rhodes commented that Ali's doosra was "not too difficult to pick at the moment but he's learning a few tricks and he's got other things up his sleeve. It's a work in progress".

==== 2013 season ====
After the departure of former England international Vikram Solanki at the end of the 2012 season Ali was handed a new 5-year contract. After performing well, including five consecutive 50s, Ali was called up to the England Lions where he scored 61 runs against Australia with many calling for him to be selected for the full team.

Moeen averaged 62 in Division 2, totalling 1375 runs altogether – the highest of any batsmen in first-class cricket and finished with 4 centuries and 8 fifties as well as 28 wickets. He was awarded county cricket's MVP award beating Samit Patel on the final day of the season and was also named PCA player of the year. Ali was also called up to the England development squad ahead of their Australian Ashes tour.

==== T20 Blast 2018 & 2019 ====
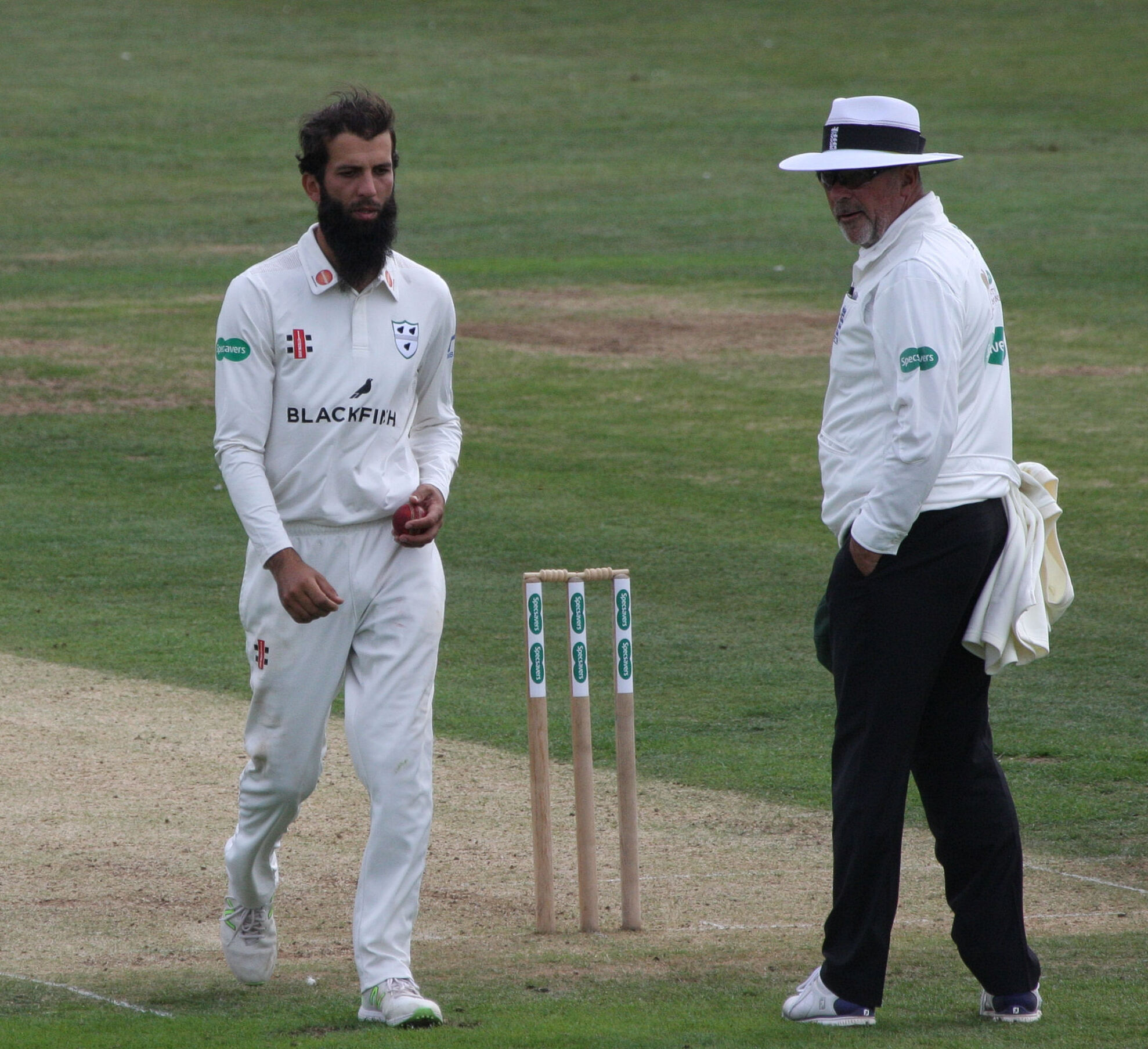
Ali in 2018

Moeen skippered the Rapids to Vitality Blast glory in 2018 as they won the competition for the first time on 15 September 2018. The Rapids beat Lancashire Lightning in the semi-final and then went on to meet the Sussex Sharks in the final where the Worcestershire boys came out on top as they won by 5 wickets to lift their first T20 Blast Trophy.

In 2019 Moeen was captain of a Worcester team who almost went all the way to retain their T20 blast trophy but lost to a last ball defeat to the Essex Eagles.

On their road to finals day, Moeen enjoyed a great campaign himself notably scoring 85 not out vs Birmingham Bears in the group stage in a 9 wicket victory. The Rapids went on to meet the 2018 runners up, Sussex Sharks, in the quarter finals as the Rapids ran out winners, with Moeen showing his international class as he dismantled the Sharks attack scoring a blistering 121 Not out as Worcestershire secured their spot at finals day 2019.

On finals day, Moeen and his team produced one of the largest come backs finals day has seen by defending 147 against the Nottinghamshire Outlaws. The Outlaws need 11 off 12 balls, the Trent Bridge team had 3 wickets fall in the penultimate over. Notts required 2 off the last ball in the semi-final and Ben Duckett missed the final ball off the game which meant the Rapids ran out the winners by 1 run as they secured their place in the final where they would meet the Essex Eagles.

Worcestershire seemed to be in control having the Eagles 82-5 and the Rapids looked like they would be the first team to defend the Vitality Blast Trophy. However the Eagles would successfully chase down 12 off the final over to win their maiden T20 Blast Trophy.

== International career ==
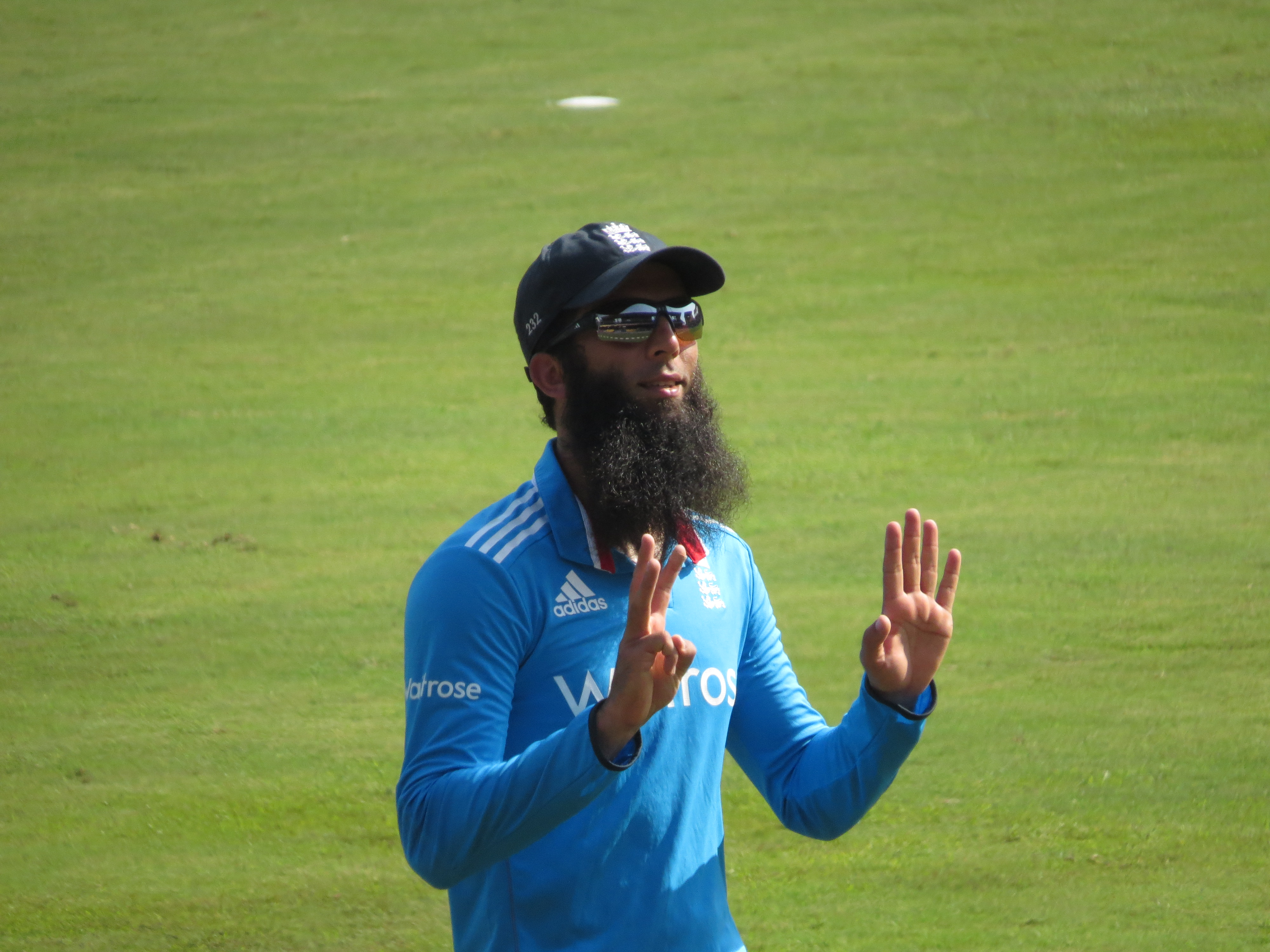
Moeen Ali at a match against Sri Lanka at R.Premadasa Stadium

=== 2014 ===
Ali was included in the English Squad for the 2014 ICC World Twenty20 in Bangladesh. Before the tournament, the squad played the West Indies in a limited overs series, and Ali made his ODI debut against the West Indies on 28 February 2014. He scored 44 runs before being dismissed and took his maiden ODI wicket. In the second match he made ten runs and took figures of 1–11. Ali was again impressive in the third match, making his first half century in a score of 55. He ended up scoring 109 runs and picking up 3 wickets in the three match series. He made his T20 debut in the second match of the T20 series, although he scored just 3 runs and did not bowl.

Ali was a part of England's 2014 World T20 squad. He managed 49 runs in 4 matches and ending up wicketless.

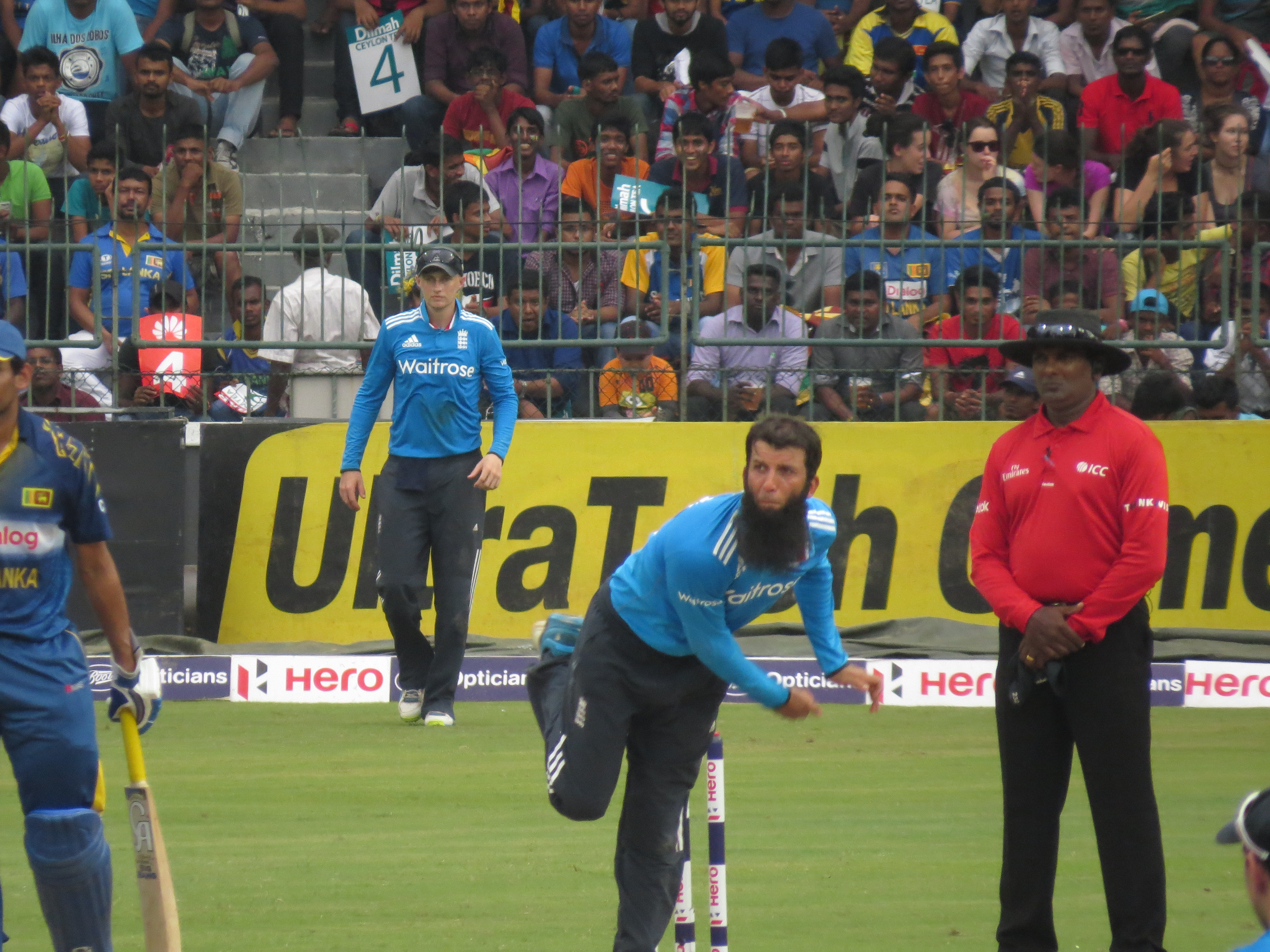
Moeen Ali bowling against Sri Lanka

Ali was named in the England Test squad for their series against Sri Lanka, before making his debut in the first Test. Ali made a score of 48 in the initial innings but only made 4 in the second. However, in the second Test of the series he made his maiden century in the second innings having started the final day with England on 57 for 5. England lost the match when Jimmy Anderson was caught off the penultimate ball of the match having survived 55 balls.

In the first Test against India, Ali took four wickets in the match, as well as scoring 14 with the bat. In the second match he made scores of 32 and 39, but could not prevent England from losing to go 1–0 down in the series. In the third test against India at the Ageas Bowl, he took his first five wicket haul in test cricket, finishing with 6–67 in India's second innings. He followed this up by taking figures of 4–39 in the fourth test, taking the prized wicket of MS Dhoni. This helped England win the game and take a 2–1 series lead. Ali only played a small part in the final match of the series, making 14 with the bat as England steamrolled India to win the series 3–1. Ali did not play in the first three ODIs against India. However, he was selected for the fourth match of the series and hit a quick fire 67. However, this was not enough to prevent a nine wicket defeat for England. In the final match of the series Ali took 2–34 to help England win their first match of the series.

In the first ODI of the seven-match series in Sri Lanka, Ali hit 119 off just 87 balls although it was not enough to prevent a defeat for England. In the third match he scored 58 and took figures of 2–36 as England won their first match of the tour.

=== 2015 ===
In the first match of England's 2015 World Cup campaign against Australia, Ali made 10 with the bat and failed to take a wicket as England suffered a heavy defeat. He scored a century in the next match against Scotland, making 128 from 107 balls to help England to a score of 303. He also took two wickets in Scotland's innings as he earned the man of the match award. Injury ruled Ali out of the final game against Afghanistan, which England won.

Due to his injury at the World Cup, Ali was not initially selected for the West Indies tour. However, after recovering, he was called up for the Second Test Match of the series. In the first innings, Ali took figures of 1–47, and was run out for a duck. In the West Indies' second innings his bowling figures were 3/51, and he was not required to bat in England's second innings as they went on to secure a nine wicket victory to lead the series 1–0. In the third Test Moeen made 58 in the first innings. However, he was disappointing with the ball, taking just one wicket. Moeen took 1–54 in the second innings as the West Indies won to level the series at 1–1.

In the first Test against New Zealand, Moeen scored 58 in England first innings to help them fight back to post 389. He then took three wickets in New Zealand's innings. He again impressed with the bat, making 43 in England's second innings and taking a wicket in New Zealand's second innings to help England win by 124 runs.

Ali was selected in the England team for the 2015 Ashes series. In the first Test, he scored 77 in England's first innings before taking two Australian first innings wickets. He then took 3–59 in Australia's second innings as England secured an opening win. Ali could only manage figures of 1–138 in Australia's first innings of the second Test and then managed 39 with the bat. He took 2–78 in Australia's second innings but England suffered a heavy defeat. He scored 38 runs in England's first innings of the third Test and then took 1–64 in Australia's Second innings as England won by 8 wickets. In the fourth Test he was again not needed to bowl in Australia's first innings but made 38 with the bat as England secured a victory by an innings and 78 runs to regain the Ashes. In Australia's first innings of the final Test he took 3–102 and then made scores of 30 and 35 and England lost by an innings but won the series 3–2.

In the only T20 match between the two teams, Ali took figures of 1–3 and made an unbeaten 72 with the bat as he was named man of the match. In the ODI series against Australia, Ali made 17 in the first match, but England suffered a defeat. England also lost the next game, with Ali proving to be expensive and finishing with figures of 1–68. He took 3–32 in the next game to help England to their first win of the series, before taking 2–40 in the fourth match of the series to help England to a three wicket victory.

In the first Test against Pakistan in 2015, Ali struggled with the ball, conceding 121 runs in the first innings without taking a wicket, although he did take two wickets in the second innings. In his new role as opener, he made 35 with the bat in the first innings and 11 in the second as the match ended in a draw. In the first innings of the second Test, he took figures of 3–108, but again struggled with the bat, making scores of 1 in both innings as England slumped to defeat. He took 2–49 in Pakistan's first innings as they were dismissed for 234 in the third Test, although he only scored 36 runs in the match as England lost by 127 runs.

Ali made little impact with the bat against Pakistan in the limited overs series, scoring just 13 runs, although he was only dismissed once. He took one wicket in each of the first three matches to help England into a 2–1 series lead with one game left to play. Ali's best bowling performance came in the final game as he took 3–53 to help dismiss the hosts for 271 as England won by 84 runs. Ali also played in two of the T20Is, taking figures of 1–30 and 1–22.

=== 2016 ===
In the Test series against South Africa, Ali returned to his place in the lower middle order. He was named as man of the match in the first Test as England won by 241 runs. While his poor batting form continued, he took figures of 4–69 and 3–47 to help England to victory. The second match ended in a draw, with Ali proving less successful with the ball, taking figures of 0–155. England won the third Test by 7 wickets, with Ali taking the wicket of Dean Elgar and finishing with figures of 1–50. In the fourth Test, Ali took figures of 2–104 in South Africa's first innings as the hosts made 475. He made 61 with the bat but England collapsed in their second innings, with Ali making an unbeaten ten. Despite this defeat, England won the series 2–1.

In the ODI series against South Africa, Ali took 3–43 in the first game as England won by 39 runs on the DL Method. In the next game he made an unbeaten 21 with the bat to help England to a five wicket victory. However, England lost the final three matches of the series, with Ali taking just two wickets and scoring 19 runs as England went from 2–0 up in the series to lose in 3–2. In the T20 match between the two teams, Ali took 2–22, although England lost the game by 3 wickets, while in the second match he took figures of 1–25, but South Africa won in convincing fashion, this time by nine wickets.

In the T20 World Cup, Ali took figures of 1–38 in the opening defeat against the West Indies. He took 2–34 against South Africa and 1–17 against Afghanistan. He also scored a crucial unbeaten 41 against Afghanistan to keep England's hopes of progressing to the semi-finals alive. In that same match he along with David Willey set the record for the highest partnership for the 8th wicket in T20 World Cup history (57*) He took 1–10 against New Zealand as England won by 7 wickets to qualify for the final. However, England lost the final, with Ali being dismissed for a duck and not bowling any of his overs.

Ali was included in the test squad for the series against Sri Lanka. In the second test at Chester-le-Street, he scored his second Test century. He scored 155 not out, an innings which included 2 sixes, helping England reach a score of 498–9. He took one wicket in the match, as England won by nine wickets.

In the first ODI against Sri Lanka, Ali took figures of 1–69 as the match ended in a tie.

In the second Test against Pakistan, he took 2–43 in Pakistan's first innings before taking 3–88 in their second as England won by 330 runs to level the series at 1–1. In the third match he made 63 with the bat in England's first innings as they reached 297. He did not pick up a wicket in Pakistan's second innings but made an unbeaten 86 in England's second innings to help them turn the game around and secure an unlikely victory. In the final match of the series he made 108 in England's first innings but could only manage 2–128 with the ball. Pakistan went on to win the match by ten wickets to level the series at 2–2. In the first ODI, Ali took figures of 1–30 as England won by 44 runs on the D/L Method. He did not take a wicket in the second ODI but scored an unbeaten 21 to help England win by four wickets. He took one wicket in the third match of the series, which England won by 169 runs. In the fourth match, he took figures of 2–39 and scored an unbeaten 45 as England went 4–0.

Ali made 68 in England's first innings of the first Test, and then took figures of 3–75. In the second innings, he made 14 before taking another two wickets to help England to victory. In the second Test, Ali took 5–57 to help to restrict Bangladesh to 220. Ali took just one wicket in the second innings and was out for a duck as England lost the match to draw the series 1–1. Especially in the English cricket team in Bangladesh in 2016–17 series, in the first test at Chittagong, Kumar Dharmasena judged that Moeen Ali was out on three occasions in the same test, also in the same innings, same session and also off the same bowler, Shakib Al Hasan and in the end Moeen Ali appealed against Dharmasena's all three decisions and survived (bottom edged, hitting outside Ali's leg stump and hitting outside his off stump respectively). This was the first time in cricketing history, that a batsman successfully managed to overturn the umpire's decisions for 3 times in a row in the same innings.

In the first Test in the series against India, Ali scored 117 in the first innings as England made 537. He took figures of 2–85 in India's reply, and took 1–47 in India's second innings as the match ended in a draw. In the second Test Ali took 3–98 in India's first innings, although he only made one with the bat, and struggled again in England's second innings as they lost by 246 runs. In the Third Test he made 16 in England's first innings and took figures of 0–33. In the second innings he made just five and did not pick up a wicket as England suffered another defeat. In the fourth Test, he made 50 with the bat, but took 2–174 with ball, before being dismissed for a duck in England's second innings as they lost by an innings and 36 runs. In the final Test, he made 146 with the bat in England's first innings total of 477. He was out for 44 in England's second innings as they lost by an innings and 75 runs to lose the series 4–0.

Ali made 28 in the first ODI against India as England made 350/7, although they lost by seven wickets. In the second match, he took figures of 0–33 and made 55 as England lost by 15 runs. In the final match, he made 2 and took figures of 0–41 as England won by five runs. In the first T20I, he took figures of 2–21 as England won seven wickets. He took 1–20 in the second match as India narrowly won by 5 runs.

=== 2017 and beyond ===
Ali played in the first ODI against the West Indies, and made an unbeaten 31 in the first game as England won by 45 runs. In the second game he took figures of 1–44 as West Indies were restricted to 225 as England secured a four wicket victory.

In the first Test against South Africa, Ali became the fifth-fastest player, in terms of matches played, to score 2,000 runs and take 100 wickets in Tests (38). He also took his first ten-wicket haul in Tests and was the first England player since Ian Botham to score a Test half-century and take ten wickets in the same match.

In the third Test, Ali took a hat-trick to bowl South Africa out and end the match; it was the first hat-trick for an England spinner since 1938–39 and the first ever in a Test match at The Oval. It was only the third time in Test history that victory has been sealed by a hat-trick (the first time for 115 years), and the first hat-trick where three left-handed batsmen were dismissed. He made 75 not out in second innings of 4th Test to help England to a strong position and finished the game with a 5-wicket haul for the second consecutive match. Ali reached 25 wickets and 250 runs in the series, the only player to ever achieve the feat in a 4 Test series.

Ali had a quieter Test series against West Indies, scoring 109 runs and taking 5 wickets in the three match series. In the third match of the ODI series that followed, he scored the second fastest century for England, taking just 53 balls to reach the milestone. In the fourth ODI he scored an unbeaten 48 off 25 deliveries to seal a series win for England.

Ali played in all 5 Tests of the 2017-18 Ashes with little success. He played with an injured spinning finger and only took 5 wickets, at an average of 115. With the bat, he scored 179 runs at an average of 20 and was dismissed 7 times in 9 innings by off-spinner Nathan Lyon.

In April 2019, he was named in England's squad for the 2019 Cricket World Cup. On 21 June 2019, in the match against Sri Lanka, Ali played in his 100th ODI.

In August 2019, Ali played against Australia in the first test match held as part of the 2019 Ashes series. Following England's defeat, Ali was dropped by England for their second Test match. Ali subsequently announced that he would be taking a "short break" from cricket. On 29 May 2020, Ali was named in a 55-man group of players to begin training ahead of international fixtures starting in England following the COVID-19 pandemic. On 17 June 2020, Ali was included in England's 30-man squad to start training behind closed doors for the Test series against the West Indies. On 9 July 2020, Ali was included in England's 24-man squad to start training behind closed doors for the ODI series against Ireland. On 21 July 2020, the ECB named Moeen Ali as England's vice-captain for the ODI series.

=== Captaining England ===
On 8 September 2020, Ali first captained England in a T20I match against Australia in Southampton. He became the first Asian-origin cricketer to captain England in T20s, and the first Asian-origin cricketer to captain England in any format since Nasser Hussain in 2003.

=== 2021 ===
On 4 January 2021, Ali tested positive for COVID-19, prior to England's tour of Sri Lanka and he recovered. He won the "man of the match" award in the second T20I against Pakistan for his all-round performance. He retired from Test cricket in September 2021. Also, in September 2021 was named in England's squad for the 2021 ICC Men's T20 World Cup. He scored 92 runs and took 7 wickets in 6 matches of the World cup. He was announced as Vice-captain of English T20 squad for West Indies tour in 2022.

=== 2022 ===
Moeen Ali captained England in 3rd, 4th and 5th T20I matches due to an injury to Eoin Morgan, and after Morgan retired from international cricket in June 2022 he was appointed vice-captain to Jos Buttler in limited overs internationals.

=== 2023 ===
On 7 June 2023, Ali came out of retirement from Test Cricket in order to be included in the England squad to face Australia in the 2023 Ashes following an injury to Jack Leach. He took his 200th Test wicket by dismissing Steve Smith in the third Test of the series, then in the following match became only the 16th player to reach that milestone and also hit 3000 Test runs. At the conclusion of the final match, he announced his retirement from Tests joining teammate Stuart Broad.

=== 2024 ===
In May 2024, Ali was named in England's squad for the 2024 ICC Men's T20 World Cup tournament.

On 8 September 2024, he formally announced his retirement from international cricket.

== Franchise cricket ==
In January 2018 in the 2018 IPL auction, Ali was picked up by Royal Challengers Bangalore for INR 1.7 crores from his base price of INR 1.5 crores. However, he was released by RCB ahead of the 2021 Indian Premier League.

In December 2019, he was drafted by Multan Sultans as their Platinum Category pick at the 2020 PSL Draft for the Pakistan Super League.

In February 2021, Ali was released by RCB and was bought by the Chennai Super Kings in the IPL auction ahead of the upcoming season for a price of nearly £700,000. Moeen was part of the CSK squad that went on to win the 2021 IPL, and 2023 IPL becoming the first Englishman to do so. He was retained by CSK for the 2022 IPL season. He captained the Birmingham Phoenix in The Hundred for the first four seasons of the tournament.

== Wrist band issue ==
Moeen Ali wore "Save Gaza" and "Free Palestine" wristbands in connection with the Gaza conflict during day 2 of the third Test match of the 2014 series against India. The ICC code bars players from "conveying messages which relate to political, religious or racial activities or causes". According to the ECB, Moeen's stance was "humanitarian, not political" and a spokesman stated that "the ECB do not believe he has committed any offence."

Although Moeen had been cleared by the ECB to wear the bands, the decision was overruled by the match referee, David Boon.

== Charity work ==
Ali is an Ambassador of StreetChance, a programme providing free weekly cricket coaching sessions in deprived areas in the UK, run by the Cricket Foundation and Barclays Spaces For Sports. In January 2015, he joined Orphans in Need, an international NGO, as a Global Brand Ambassador and carried the charity's logo on his bat. Speaking after his stint at the crease, Moeen Ali said, "I enjoy coming back to the community where I grew up playing tapeball cricket. It keeps you grounded. I hope that, as an ambassador for the charity, I can pass on some useful advice and help inspire children like the ones here today involved in StreetChance. It's so important that schemes like StreetChance give young people the opportunity to play cricket and to learn key life skills, wherever they're from, whatever their background."

== Personal life ==
Ali is married to Firoza Hossain. They have a daughter and a son. Ali is a keen football fan and a lifelong supporter of Liverpool FC.

== Honours, awards and nominations ==
In January 2015, Ali was nominated for the Best at Sport award at the British Muslim Awards.

Ali was appointed Officer of the Order of the British Empire (OBE) in the 2022 Birthday Honours for services to cricket.

In November 2024, Ali received Honorary Doctorate from Coventry University for his contribution to English cricket during a decade-long international career.
