= Glamorgan County Cricket Club in 2014 =

Glamorgan County Cricket Club
2014 season
- Coach: (Wales) Toby Radford
- Captain: (Wales) Mark Wallace (FC & LA) (Australia) Jim Allenby (T20)
- Overseas player: (South Africa) Jacques Rudolph
- Ground(s): SWALEC Stadium, Cardiff; St Helen's Ground, Swansea; Penrhyn Avenue, Rhos-on-Sea
- County Championship: 8th, Division Two
- One-Day Cup: 5th, Group B
- T20 Blast: Quarter-finals
- Most runs: FC: Will Bragg (1,008); LA: Jacques Rudolph (575); T20: Jim Allenby (548)
- Most wickets: FC: Michael Hogan (63); LA: Michael Hogan (14); Dean Cosker (14); T20: Michael Hogan (21)
- Most catches: FC: Jim Allenby (15); LA: Jim Allenby (6); T20: Michael Hogan (7)
- Most wicket-keeping dismissals: FC: Mark Wallace (68 ct + 3 st); LA: Mark Wallace (11 ct + 0 st); T20: Mark Wallace (7 ct + 3 st)

The 2014 season marked Glamorgan County Cricket Club's 127th year of existence and its 94th as a first-class cricket county. In 2014, Glamorgan played in the Second Division of the County Championship, Group B of the 50-over One-Day Cup and the South Group of the T20 Blast. It was the first season in charge for head coach Toby Radford. The on-field captains were Mark Wallace for the County Championship and One-Day Cup, and Jim Allenby for the T20 Blast. Unlike other counties, Glamorgan competed in limited-overs cricket without a nickname for the second year in a row.

== Squad ==
- No. denotes the player's squad number, as worn on the back of their shirt.
- ‡ denotes players with international caps.
- * denotes a player who has been awarded a county cap.
- Ages given as of the first day of the County Championship season, 6 April 2014.

No.	Name	Nationality	Birth date	Batting style	Bowling style	Notes
Batsmen
4	Jacques Rudolph ‡	South Africa	4 May 1981 (aged 32)	Left-handed	Right arm leg break	Overseas player
22	Will Bragg	Wales	24 October 1986 (aged 27)	Left-handed	—	Occasional wicket-keeper
26	Stewart Walters	Australia	25 June 1983 (aged 30)	Right-handed	Right arm leg break	
28	Gareth Rees*	Wales	8 April 1985 (aged 28)	Left-handed	Left arm medium	
29	Ben Wright*	England	5 December 1987 (aged 26)	Right-handed	Right arm medium-fast	
40	Murray Goodwin ‡*	Zimbabwe	11 December 1972 (aged 41)	Right-handed	Right arm leg break	Kolpak registration
	Aneurin Donald	Wales	20 December 1996 (aged 17)	Right-handed	Right arm off break	
	Tom Lancefield	England	8 October 1990 (aged 23)	Left-handed	Left arm medium	
All-rounders
5	Jim Allenby*	Australia	12 September 1982 (aged 31)	Right-handed	Right arm medium	T20 captain
8	Graham Wagg	England	28 April 1983 (aged 30)	Right-handed	Left arm medium	
20	Ruaidhri Smith	Scotland	5 August 1994 (aged 19)	Right-handed	Right arm medium	
88	Darren Sammy	West Indies	20 December 1983 (aged 30)	Right-handed	Right arm medium-fast	Overseas player (T20 only)
Wicket-keepers
18	Mark Wallace*	Wales	19 November 1981 (aged 32)	Left-handed	—	Club captain
24	Chris Cooke	South Africa	30 May 1986 (aged 27)	Right-handed	—	
Bowlers
17	Huw Waters	Wales	26 September 1986 (aged 27)	Right-handed	Right arm medium	
21	Andrew Salter	Wales	1 June 1993 (aged 20)	Right-handed	Right arm off break	
23	Dean Cosker*	England	7 January 1978 (aged 36)	Right-handed	Slow left-arm orthodox	
31	Michael Hogan	Australia	31 May 1981 (aged 32)	Right-handed	Right arm fast-medium	
34	Will Owen	Wales	2 September 1988 (aged 25)	Right-handed	Right arm medium-fast	
35	Michael Reed	England	10 September 1988 (aged 25)	Right-handed	Right arm fast-medium	
36	John Glover	Wales	29 August 1989 (aged 24)	Right-handed	Right arm medium-fast	
	Kieran Bull	Wales	5 April 1995 (aged 19)	Right-handed	Right arm off break	
	James Harris	Wales	16 May 1990 (aged 23)	Right-handed	Right arm medium-fast	On loan from Middlesex from 16 July to 18 August
	Tom Helm	England	7 May 1994 (aged 19)	Right-handed	Right arm medium-fast	
	David Lloyd	Wales	15 June 1992 (aged 21)	Right-handed	Right arm off break	
	Dewi Penrhyn Jones	Wales	9 September 1994 (aged 19)	Right-handed	Right arm fast	

== County Championship ==
Team	Pld	W	L	T	D	A	Bat	Bowl	Ded	Pts
Hampshire (P)	16	7	1	0	8	0	50	38	0	240
Worcestershire (P)	16	8	3	0	5	0	37	47	0	237
Essex	16	7	2	0	7	0	37	45	0	229
Derbyshire	16	6	5	0	5	0	26	41	0	188
Surrey	16	4	5	0	7	0	43	44	3	183
Kent	16	4	6	0	6	0	35	42	0	171
Gloucestershire	16	4	5	0	7	0	28	36	0	163
Glamorgan	16	3	6	0	7	0	29	41	0	153
Leicestershire	16	0	10	0	6	0	36	42	0	108

6–9 April
Scorecard

Surrey (H)	v	Glamorgan
280 (104.4 overs); ZS Ansari 74 (259); J Allenby 4/47 (30 overs)		209 (57.3 overs); J Allenby 52 (68); SC Meaker 4/57 (16 overs)
81 (57.3 overs); GC Smith 18 (27); GG Wagg 6/29 (15 overs)		156/0 (45.4 overs); Gareth Rees 75* (141)

Glamorgan won by 10 wickets
The Oval, London
Umpires: Peter Hartley and Steve O'Shaughnessy

- Glamorgan won the toss and elected to field.
- Points: Glamorgan 20, Surrey 5.

20–23 April
Scorecard

Glamorgan (H)	v	Gloucestershire
145 (43 overs); Graham Wagg 54* (65); David Payne 3/29 (10 overs)		231 (75 overs); Chris Dent 52 (72); Dean Cosker 5/46 (22 overs)
146/9 (62 overs); Will Bragg 43 (127); Will Gidman 6/50 (25 overs)

Match drawn
SWALEC Stadium, Cardiff
Umpires: Martin Bodenham and Nigel Llong

- Gloucestershire won the toss and elected to field.
- Points: Gloucestershire 9, Glamorgan 8.

27–30 April
Scorecard

Leicestershire (H)	v	Glamorgan
500 (121.4 overs); Niall O'Brien 133 (141); Graham Wagg 4/107 (27 overs)		359 (104 overs); Gareth Rees 72 (161); Anthony Ireland 3/81 (27 overs)
179/8d (42.3 overs); Greg Smith 97 (131); Graham Wagg 4/65 (14 overs)		250/7 (70.4 overs); Jacques Rudolph 63 (89); Jigar Naik 3/76 (27 overs)

Match drawn
Grace Road, Leicester
Umpires: Nick Cook and Jeff Evans

- Glamorgan won the toss and elected to field.
- Points: Leicestershire 13, Glamorgan 11.

4–7 May
Scorecard

Worcestershire	v	(H) Glamorgan
240 (102.2 overs); Daryl Mitchell 109 (323); Dean Cosker 5/39 (29.2 overs)		155 (49 overs); Mark Wallace 51* (78); Gareth Andrew 5/40 (14 overs)
296/6d (79 overs); Daryl Mitchell 151* (243); Dean Cosker 4/94 (27 overs)		229/7 (98.4 overs); Will Bragg 91* (285); Jack Shantry 2/25 (18 overs)

Match drawn
SWALEC Stadium, Cardiff
Umpires: Russell Evans and Michael Gough

- Glamorgan won the toss and elected to field.
- Points: Worcestershire 9, Glamorgan 8.

11–14 May
Scorecard

Glamorgan	v	(H) Hampshire
224 (61.2 overs); Mark Wallace 67* (70); Sean Ervine 3/36 (11 overs)		345 (110 overs); Michael Carberry 66 (130); Jim Allenby 4/67 (25 overs)
187 (68.4 overs); Will Bragg 74 (124); James Tomlinson 3/40 (14.4 overs)		68/4 (15 overs); James Vince 29* (34); Ruaidhri Smith 3/38 (8 overs)

Hampshire won by 6 wickets
Rose Bowl, Southampton
Umpires: Steve O'Shaughnessy and Alex Wharf

- Hampshire won the toss and elected to field.
- Points: Hampshire 22, Glamorgan 4.

25–28 May
Scorecard

Leicestershire	v	(H) Glamorgan
109 (38 overs); Niall O'Brien 17 (22); Jim Allenby 3/20 (13 overs)		350/8d (105 overs); Jacques Rudolph 88 (178); Charlie Shreck 3/64 (27 overs)
204/8 (89 overs); Angus Robson 81 (181); Michael Hogan 3/41 (19 overs)

Match drawn
SWALEC Stadium, Cardiff
Umpires: Martin Bodenham and Nigel Cowley

- Glamorgan won the toss and elected to field.
- Points: Glamorgan 12, Leicestershire 7.

1–4 June
Scorecard

Glamorgan	v	(H) Essex
244 (95.2 overs); Will Bragg 93 (214); Reece Topley 6/41 (20.2 overs)		280 (87.3 overs); James Foster 86 (139); Michael Hogan 3/59 (25 overs)
250 (84.1 overs); Jim Allenby 79 (135); Reece Topley 4/67 (29 overs)		28/2 (6 overs); Tom Westley 11* (11); Michael Hogan 2/15 (3 overs)

Match drawn
County Ground, Chelmsford
Umpires: Steve O'Shaughnessy and George Sharp

- Glamorgan won the toss and elected to bat.
- Points: Essex 10, Glamorgan 9.

15–18 June
Scorecard

Kent	v	(H) Glamorgan
253 (102.4 overs); Rob Key 63 (147); Michael Hogan 5/58 (26.4 overs)		527 (141.2 overs); Jacques Rudolph 102 (170); Adam Riley 5/157 (42 overs)
263 (71 overs); Darren Stevens 60 (57); Michael Hogan 5/67 (17 overs)

Glamorgan won by an innings and 11 runs
SWALEC Stadium, Cardiff
Umpires: Nigel Cowley and Alex Wharf

- Kent won the toss and elected to bat.
- Points: Glamorgan 24, Kent 3.

21–24 June
Scorecard

Gloucestershire (H)	v	Glamorgan
391 (131.5 overs); Hamish Marshall 109 (173); Michael Hogan 4/57 (27 overs)		615/7d (159 overs); Jacques Rudolph 139 (266); Tom Smith 3/183 (52 overs)
165/5 (84 overs); Will Gidman 47* (86); Graham Wagg 2/22 (13 overs)

Match drawn
County Ground, Bristol
Umpires: Steve Garratt and Richard Kettleborough

- Gloucestershire won the toss and elected to bat.
- Patrick Grieshaber (Glos) made his first-class debut.
- Points: Glamorgan 12, Gloucestershire 9.

29 June–2 July
Scorecard

Worcestershire (H)	v	Glamorgan
352 (114.1 overs); Tom Fell 133 (246); Michael Hogan 4/73 (27 overs)		297 (92.2 overs); Jacques Rudolph 88 (187); Saeed Ajmal 5/106 (34.2 overs)
299/7d (73 overs); Moeen Ali 80 (87); Dean Cosker 5/97 (25 overs)		105 (51.4 overs); Jim Allenby 35 (52); Saeed Ajmal 7/34 (17.4 overs)

Worcestershire won by 249 runs
New Road, Worcester
Umpires: Mark Benson and Graham Lloyd

- Worcestershire won the toss and elected to bat.
- Richard Oliver (Worcs) made his first-class debut.

6–9 July
Scorecard

Glamorgan (H)	v	Surrey
232 (53.4 overs); Jim Allenby 69 (84); Chris Tremlett 5/60 (16.4 overs)		589/8d (153 overs); Zafar Ansari 112 (319); Jim Allenby 2/77 (32 overs)
398 (118.5 overs); Chris Cooke 83* (183); Matt Dunn 4/124 (28 overs)		43/1 (12.5 overs); Arun Harinath 19* (36); Will Owen 1/15 (6 overs)

Surrey won by 9 wickets
Penrhyn Avenue, Rhos-on-Sea
Umpires: Jeff Evans and Peter Willey

- Glamorgan won the toss and elected to bat.
- Points: Surrey 23, Glamorgan 2.

20–22 July
Scorecard

Glamorgan	v	(H) Derbyshire
138 (53.2 overs); Murray Goodwin 44 (143); Alex Hughes 4/46 (12.2 overs)		241 (77.1 overs); Wes Durston 50 (57); Michael Hogan 5/63 (21.1 overs)
175 (49.2 overs); Will Owen 28 (22); Mark Footitt 6/48 (15 overs)		73/4 (24.3 overs); Ben Slater 20 (60); Michael Hogan 2/17 (9 overs)

Derbyshire won by 6 wickets
County Ground, Derby
Umpires: Nick Cook and Tim Robinson

- Derbyshire won the toss and elected to field.
- Points: Derbyshire 20, Glamorgan 3.

15–18 August
Scorecard

Essex	v	(H) Glamorgan
286 (81.5 overs); Nick Browne 73 (194); Jim Allenby 5/56 (15.5 overs)		161 (60.5 overs); Jim Allenby 56* (126); Monty Panesar 5/50 (28 overs)
222 (66 overs); Ryan ten Doeschate 63* (122); Michael Hogan 4/55 (18 overs)		284 (98.2 overs); Graham Wagg 64 (125); Monty Panesar 6/118 (45 overs)

Essex won by 63 runs
St Helen's, Swansea
Umpires: Paul Baldwin and Alex Wharf

- Essex won the toss and elected to bat.
- Points: Essex 21, Glamorgan 3.

31 August – 3 September
Scorecard

Glamorgan	v	(H) Kent
329 (89.1 overs); Chris Cooke 171 (214); Mitchell Claydon 4/47 (20 overs)		387 (132.3 overs); Sam Northeast 102 (202); Kieran Bull 4/62 (25.3 overs)
415/9d (112.1 overs); Graham Wagg 116* (183); Mitchell Claydon 3/36 (15 overs)

Match drawn
St Lawrence Ground, Canterbury
Umpires: Neil Bainton and David Millns

- Glamorgan won the toss and elected to bat.
- Kieran Bull (Glam) made his first-class debut.

9–11 September
Scorecard

Glamorgan (H)	v	Derbyshire
282 (90.1 overs); Chris Cooke 74 (159); Tony Palladino 3/34 (21 overs)		203 (54.1 overs); Wayne White 38 (22); Jim Allenby 3/42 (15.1 overs)
181 (57.5 overs); Chris Cooke 36 (76); Wayne White 4/27 (9 overs)		154 (52.1 overs); Wes Durston 72 (91); Michael Hogan 4/38 (15 overs)

Glamorgan won by 106 runs
SWALEC Stadium, Cardiff
Umpires: Nigel Llong and Neil Mallender

- Glamorgan won the toss and elected to bat.
- Points: Glamorgan 21, Derbyshire 4.

23–26 September
Scorecard

Hampshire	v	(H) Glamorgan
357 (93.4 overs); James Vince 144 (214); Jim Allenby 4/74 (20 overs)		172 (53.3 overs); Mark Wallace 51 (113); Chris Wood 4/42 (11 overs)
258/9d (55 overs); Jimmy Adams 91 (121); Jim Allenby 6/54 (17 overs)		152 (33.4 overs); Aneurin Donald 59 (60); James Tomlinson 6/48 (11 overs)

Hampshire won by 291 runs
SWALEC Stadium, Cardiff
Umpires: Graham Lloyd and Jeremy Lloyds

- Hampshire won the toss and elected to bat.
- Aneurin Donald (Glam) made his first-class debut.
- Points: Hampshire 23, Glamorgan 3.

== One-Day Cup ==
Pos	Team	Pld	W	L	T	NR	Ded	Pts	NRR
1	Nottinghamshire Outlaws	8	4	1	1	2	0	11	0.364
2	Kent Spitfires	8	4	1	1	2	0	11	0.245
3	Warwickshire Bears	8	4	3	0	1	0	9	0.343
4	Durham	8	4	3	0	1	0	9	0.212
5	Glamorgan	8	4	4	0	0	0	8	0.230
6	Somerset	8	3	4	1	0	0	7	0.067
7	Middlesex Panthers	8	3	4	0	1	0	7	−0.280
8	Sussex Sharks	8	3	5	0	0	0	6	−0.501
9	Surrey	8	1	5	1	1	0	4	−0.643

26 July
Scorecard

Middlesex Panthers; 174/8 (50 overs)	v	Glamorgan; 175/3 (36.2 overs)
Neil Dexter 43* (85); David Lloyd 3/25 (8 overs)		Jim Allenby 70 (90); Ravi Patel 2/43 (10 overs)

Glamorgan won by 7 wickets
SWALEC Stadium, Cardiff
Umpires: Nigel Cowley and Steve Garratt

- Glamorgan won the toss and elected to field.
- David Lloyd, Dewi Penrhyn Jones (both Glam), Nick Gubbins and Ryan Higgins (both Middx) made their List A debuts.
- Points: Glamorgan 2, Middlesex Panthers 0.

27 July

Surrey; 307/8 (50 overs)	v	Glamorgan; 308/7 (48.3 overs)
Rory Burns 87 (95); Dean Cosker 2/39 (10 overs)		Will Bragg 88 (103); Stuart Meaker 4/78 (8.3 overs)

Glamorgan won by 3 wickets
Woodbridge Road, Guildford
Umpires: Graham Lloyd and Alex Wharf

- Glamorgan won the toss and elected to field.
- Freddie van den Bergh made his List A debut.
- Points: Glamorgan 2, Surrey 0.

30 July

Glamorgan; 227/8 (50 overs)	v	Nottinghamshire Outlaws; 230/7 (48.3 overs)
Jacques Rudolph 101 (131); James Franklin 3/32 (8 overs)		Riki Wessels 65 (74); Michael Hogan 3/47 (9.3 overs)

Nottinghamshire Outlaws won by 3 wickets
SWALEC Stadium, Cardiff
Umpires: Mark Benson and Alex Wharf

- Nottinghamshire Outlaws won the toss and elected to field.
- Points: Nottinghamshire Outlaws 2, Glamorgan 0.

6 August

Glamorgan; 209 (46.4 overs)	v	Kent Spitfires; 210/4 (43.4 overs)
Chris Cooke 73 (100); Doug Bollinger 5/35 (8.4 overs)		Darren Stevens 62* (59); Dean Cosker 3/56 (10 overs)

Kent Spitfires won by 6 wickets
St Lawrence Ground, Canterbury
Umpires: Neil Mallender and George Sharp
Player of the match: Doug Bollinger (Kent)

- Glamorgan won the toss and elected to bat.
- Points: Kent Spitfires 2, Glamorgan 0.

8 August

Durham; 185 (45 overs)	v	Glamorgan; 133 (41.1 overs)
Phil Mustard 53 (76); David Lloyd 4/10 (3 overs)		Jacques Rudolph 61 (99); Paul Collingwood 4/16 (7.1 overs)

Durham won by 52 runs
SWALEC Stadium, Cardiff
Umpires: Mark Benson and Peter Willey

- Durham won the toss and elected to bat.
- Points: Durham 2, Glamorgan 0.

12 August

Glamorgan; 289/6 (47 overs)	v	Somerset; 207 (40 overs)
Jacques Rudolph 111 (129); Lewis Gregory 4/48 (9 overs)		Peter Trego 45 (60); Michael Hogan 3/19 (8 overs)

Glamorgan won by 95 runs (D/L method)
County Ground, Taunton
Umpires: Neil Bainton and Nigel Cowley

- Somerset won the toss and elected to field.
- Rain reduced the match to 47 overs a side.
- Points: Glamorgan 2, Somerset 0.

14 August

Glamorgan; 225/7 (39 overs)	v	Warwickshire Bears; 90/3 (8.3 overs)
Jacques Rudolph 57 (77); Ateeq Javid 3/48 (7 overs)		Varun Chopra 39* (26); Dean Cosker 2/19 (2 overs)

Warwickshire won by 7 wickets (D/L method)
St Helen's, Swansea
Umpires: Mike Burns and Peter Willey

- Warwickshire Bears won the toss and elected to field.
- Rain reduced the Glamorgan innings to 39 overs and the Warwickshire Bears innings to 10 overs, with a target of 90 runs.
- Points: Warwickshire Bears 2, Glamorgan 0.

20 August

Sussex Sharks; 323/3 (48 overs)	v	Glamorgan; 330/3 (46.4 overs)
Luke Wright 127 (115); Andrew Salter 1/33 (5 overs)		Jacques Rudolph 169* (150); Lewis Hatchett 1/50 (10 overs)

Glamorgan won by 7 wickets (D/L method)
County Ground, Hove
Umpires: Martin Bodenham and Peter Willey

- Sussex won the toss and elected to bat.
- Rain reduced the match to 48 overs a side.
- Fynn Hudson-Prentice (Sssx) made his List A debut.
- Points: Glamorgan 2, Sussex 0.

== T20 Blast ==
=== South Division ===
Pos	Team	Pld	W	L	T	NR	Ded	Pts	NRR
1	Essex Eagles	14	10	4	0	0	0	20	0.401
2	Surrey	14	9	5	0	0	0	18	0.426
3	Hampshire	14	9	5	0	0	0	18	0.136
4	Glamorgan	14	6	5	1	2	0	15	0.145
5	Somerset	14	6	7	0	1	0	13	−0.107
6	Kent Spitfires	14	6	7	1	0	0	13	−0.229
7	Sussex Sharks	14	6	8	0	0	0	12	−0.022
8	Gloucestershire Gladiators	14	5	7	0	2	2	10	−0.362
9	Middlesex Panthers	14	2	11	0	1	0	5	−0.457

16 May
Scorecard

Glamorgan; 161/7 (20 overs)	v	(H) Hampshire; 151/6 (20 overs)
Jacques Rudolph 34 (21); Danny Briggs 3/26 (4 overs)		Matt Coles 42 (29); Will Owen 3/32 (4 overs)

Glamorgan won by 10 runs
The Rose Bowl, Southampton
Umpires: Peter Hartley and Martin Saggers
Player of the match: Jim Allenby (Glam)

- Hampshire won the toss and elected to field.
- Andrew Salter and Ruaidhri Smith (Glam) made their Twenty20 debuts.
- Points: Glamorgan 2, Hampshire 0.

23 May
Scorecard

Glamorgan; 189/6 (20 overs)	v	(H) Essex Eagles; 195/6 (19.4 overs)
Jim Allenby 68 (50); Jesse Ryder 2/24 (4 overs)		Tom Westley 48 (29); Michael Hogan 3/30 (4 overs)

Essex Eagles won by 4 wickets
County Ground, Chelmsford
Umpires: Jeff Evans and David Millns
Player of the match: Tom Westley (Essx)

- Essex Eagles won the toss and elected to field.
- Matt Salisbury, Kishen Velani (both Essx) and David Lloyd (Glam) made their Twenty20 debuts.
- Points: Essex Eagles 2, Glamorgan 0.

30 May
Scorecard

Sussex Sharks; 178/7 (20 overs)	v	(H) Glamorgan; 179/5 (20 overs)
Matt Prior 39 (24); Graham Wagg 2/28 (4 overs)		Chris Cooke 65* (31); Steffan Piolet 2/33 (4 overs)

Glamorgan won by 5 wickets
SWALEC Stadium, Cardiff
Umpires: Jeremy Lloyds and Tim Robinson
Player of the match: Chris Cooke (Glam)

- Glamorgan won the toss and elected to field.
- Points: Glamorgan 2, Sussex Sharks 0.

6 June
Scorecard

Glamorgan; 176/3 (20 overs)	v	(H) Somerset; 169/4 (20 overs)
Jim Allenby 96* (59); Craig Overton 1/27 (3 overs)		Peter Trego 94* (59); Graham Wagg 3/44 (4 overs)

Glamorgan won by 7 runs
County Ground, Taunton
Umpires: Rob Bailey and Neil Bainton
Player of the match: Jim Allenby (Glam)

- Glamorgan won the toss and elected to bat.
- Points: Glamorgan 2, Somerset 0.

8 June
Scorecard

Gloucestershire Gladiators (H); 207/3 (20 overs)	v	Glamorgan
Michael Klinger 70 (47); Michael Hogan 2/46 (4 overs)

No result
County Ground, Bristol
Umpires: Michael Gough and Tim Robinson

- Gloucestershire Gladiators won the toss and elected to bat.
- Rain interrupted the Gloucestershire Gladiators innings twice before preventing commencement of the Glamorgan innings.
- Points: Gloucestershire Gladiators 1, Glamorgan 1.

13 June
Scorecard

Glamorgan (H); 177/7 (20 overs)	v	Kent Spitfires; 177/9 (20 overs)
Jim Allenby 54 (37); Darren Stevens 3/22 (4 overs)		Darren Stevens 71 (39); Darren Sammy 2/29 (4 overs)

Match tied
SWALEC Stadium, Cardiff
Umpires: Graham Lloyd and David Millns

- Kent Spitfires won the toss and elected to field.
- Points: Glamorgan 1, Kent Spitfires 1.

20 June
Scorecard

Glamorgan (H); 165/5 (20 overs)	v	Surrey; 148/8 (20 overs)
Hashim Amla 55 (46); Dean Cosker 2/25 (4 overs)		Jim Allenby 52 (42); Tom Curran 3/23 (4 overs)

Surrey won by 17 runs
SWALEC Stadium, Cardiff
Umpires: Martin Bodenham and Peter Willey
Player of the match: Hashim Amla (Surrey)

- Glamorgan won the toss and elected to field.
- Points: Surrey 2, Glamorgan 0.

25 June
Scorecard

Hampshire; 170/6 (20 overs)	v	(H) Glamorgan; 164/6 (20 overs)
Michael Carberry 59 (40); Will Owen 2/21 (3 overs)		Mark Wallace 38 (23); Matt Coles 2/25 (4 overs)

Hampshire won by 6 runs
SWALEC Stadium, Cardiff
Umpires: Steve Garratt and Steve O'Shaughnessy
Player of the match: Jimmy Adams (Hants)

- Glamorgan won the toss and elected to field.
- Points: Hampshire 2, Glamorgan 0.

3 July
Scorecard

Middlesex Panthers (H); 184/3 (20 overs)	v	Glamorgan; 187/4 (19.3 overs)
Dawid Malan 68* (48); Jacques Rudolph 1/13 (2 overs)		Jim Allenby 105 (63); James Harris 2/49 (4 overs)

Glamorgan won by 6 wickets
Old Deer Park, Richmond
Umpires: Nick Cook and Alex Wharf
Player of the match: Jim Allenby (Glam)

- Middlesex Panthers won the toss and elected to bat.
- Points: Glamorgan 2, Middlesex Panthers 0.

4 July
Scorecard

Glamorgan (H)	v	Somerset

No result (abandoned with a toss)
SWALEC Stadium, Cardiff
Umpires: Mark Benson and Graham Lloyd

- Somerset won the toss and elected to field.
- Points: Glamorgan 1, Somerset 1.

11 July
Scorecard

Glamorgan; 192/4 (20 overs)	v	(H) Surrey; 188/4 (20 overs)
Jacques Rudolph 75* (56); Gareth Batty 2/26 (4 overs)		Jason Roy 60 (41); Michael Hogan 2/28 (4 overs)

Glamorgan won by 4 runs
The Oval, London
Umpires: Neil Bainton and Nick Cook
Player of the match: Jacques Rudolph (Glam)

- Surrey won the toss and elected to field.
- Points: Glamorgan 2, Surrey 0.

15 July
Scorecard

Glamorgan; 151/8 (20 overs)	v	(H) Sussex Sharks; 153/5 (18.3 overs)
Jacques Rudolph 62 (50); Will Beer 3/14 (4 overs)		Luke Wright 66 (39); Dean Cosker 1/20 (3 overs)

Sussex Sharks won by 5 wickets
County Ground, Hove
Umpires: Rob Bailey and Ian Gould
Player of the match: Will Beer (Sssx)

- Glamorgan won the toss and elected to bat.
- Points: Sussex Sharks 2, Glamorgan 0.

18 July
Scorecard

Glamorgan (H); 157/2 (20 overs)	v	Essex Eagles; 159/3 (18 overs)
Murray Goodwin 71 (43); Ravi Bopara 1/29 (4 overs)		Jesse Ryder 51 (28); Jim Allenby 2/34 (4 overs)

Essex Eagles won by 7 wickets
SWALEC Stadium, Cardiff
Umpires: Jeremy Lloyds and Alex Wharf
Player of the match: Jesse Ryder (Essx)

- Essex Eagles won the toss and elected to field.
- Points: Essex Eagles 2, Glamorgan 0.

25 July
Scorecard

Gloucestershire Gladiators; 108/9 (20 overs)	v	(H) Glamorgan; 110/2 (12 overs)
Benny Howell 26 (32); Michael Hogan 2/15 (4 overs)		Jacques Rudolph 44* (40); Tom Smith 2/24 (3 overs)

Glamorgan won by 8 wickets
SWALEC Stadium, Cardiff
Umpires: Nigel Cowley and Steve Garratt
Player of the match: Jacques Rudolph (Glam)

- Glamorgan won the toss and elected to field.
- Robbie Montgomery (Glos) made his Twenty20 debut.
- Points: Glamorgan 2, Gloucestershire Gladiators 0.

=== Quarter-final ===
1–2 August
14:00
Scorecard

Lancashire Lightning (H); 137/8 (20 overs)	v	Glamorgan; 136/7 (20 overs)
Usman Khawaja 67 (54); Graham Wagg 3/28 (4 overs)		Jacques Rudolph 67* (49); Jordan Clark 4/22 (4 overs)

Lancashire Lightning won by 1 run
Old Trafford Cricket Ground, Manchester
Umpires: Jeff Evans and Peter Hartley
Player of the match: Jordan Clark (Lancs)

- Glamorgan won the toss and elected to field.
- Rain on the scheduled day meant the match was played on the reserve day.

== Statistics ==
=== Batting ===
First-class
Player	Matches	Innings	NO	Runs	HS	Ave	SR	100	50	0	4s	6s
Will Bragg	17	31	3	1008	100*	36.00	43.00	1	6	1	127	1
Jim Allenby	17	29	2	969	100	35.88	61.87	1	5	2	127	13
Chris Cooke	13	21	1	870	171	43.50	54.37	1	8	3	100	1
Jacques Rudolph	15	27	0	857	139	31.74	49.45	2	5	2	115	2
Mark Wallace	17	29	3	669	82	25.73	49.62	0	4	4	73	1
Graham Wagg	12	21	5	572	116*	35.75	63.62	1	5	1	72	10
Gareth Rees	8	16	1	396	81	26.40	45.20	0	4	3	48	3
Stewart Walters	6	10	1	356	143	39.55	58.55	1	1	1	45	3
Murray Goodwin	8	15	0	347	50	23.13	50.95	0	1	3	47	1
Dean Cosker	17	27	7	279	45	13.95	42.08	0	0	1	31	0

List A
Player	Matches	Innings	NO	Runs	HS	Ave	SR	100	50	0	4s	6s
Jacques Rudolph	8	8	1	575	169*	82.14	83.94	3	3	0	67	3
Murray Goodwin	8	8	0	307	74	38.37	101.32	0	4	0	36	5
Chris Cooke	8	8	2	199	73	33.16	79.91	0	2	0	17	1
Jim Allenby	7	7	0	154	70	22.00	83.69	0	1	2	24	0
Will Bragg	5	5	0	152	88	30.40	72.72	0	1	0	14	1
Mark Wallace	8	7	3	95	21*	23.75	76.00	0	0	0	9	0
Graham Wagg	7	6	1	79	37*	15.80	75.96	0	0	0	9	0
Andrew Salter	7	5	4	66	36*	66.00	115.78	0	0	0	10	0
Gareth Rees	2	2	0	64	60	32.00	81.01	0	1	0	5	0
David Lloyd	7	5	0	53	32	10.60	73.61	0	0	1	5	0

Twenty20
Player	Matches	Innings	NO	Runs	HS	Ave	SR	100	50	0	4s	6s
Jim Allenby	15	13	1	548	105	45.66	137.68	1	4	0	63	14
Jacques Rudolph	15	13	4	543	75*	60.33	123.40	0	6	1	61	2
Chris Cooke	15	11	3	246	65*	30.75	158.70	0	1	0	25	8
Murray Goodwin	12	8	2	203	71	33.83	141.95	0	1	0	18	6
Mark Wallace	15	11	0	166	38	15.09	138.33	0	0	1	16	5
Stewart Walters	10	7	1	105	36	17.50	125.00	0	0	2	8	2
Darren Sammy	6	5	2	58	28	19.33	118.36	0	0	1	4	3
Graham Wagg	9	5	2	45	21*	15.00	107.14	0	0	0	2	1
Ben Wright	12	8	1	44	15	6.28	110.00	0	0	2	1	3
Andrew Salter	12	7	6	35	10	35.00	112.90	0	0	0	5	0

=== Bowling ===
First-class
Player	Matches	Innings	Overs	Maidens	Runs	Wickets	BBI	BBM	Ave	Econ	SR	5w	10w
Michael Hogan	13	23	444.5	106	1232	63	5/58	10/125	19.55	2.76	42.3	3	1
Jim Allenby	17	27	451.4	123	1119	54	6/54	10/128	20.72	2.47	50.1	2	1
Dean Cosker	17	29	425.4	115	1183	42	5/39	9/133	28.16	2.77	60.8	3	0
Graham Wagg	12	21	367.4	77	1258	41	6/29	8/172	30.68	3.42	53.8	1	0
Ruaidhri Smith	8	14	167.4	21	666	12	3/38	4/139	55.50	3.97	83.8	0	0
Will Owen	6	12	128.0	24	523	10	3/42	3/69	52.30	4.08	76.8	0	0
Kieran Bull	3	4	44.3	6	168	7	4/62	4/62	24.00	3.77	38.1	0	0
Tom Helm	4	7	84.0	15	276	7	2/9	4/44	39.42	3.28	72.0	0	0
James Harris	2	4	47.0	10	138	5	2/34	3/62	27.60	2.93	56.4	0	0
David Lloyd	4	6	35.0	1	126	4	2/22	2/22	31.50	3.60	52.5	0	0

List A
Player	Matches	Innings	Overs	Maidens	Runs	Wickets	BBI	Ave	Econ	SR	4w	5w
Michael Hogan	7	7	56.0	8	266	14	3/19	19.00	4.75	24.0	0	0
Dean Cosker	8	8	68.0	3	313	14	3/33	22.35	4.60	29.1	0	0
David Lloyd	7	7	31.0	2	149	8	4/10	18.62	4.80	23.2	1	0
Graham Wagg	7	7	50.0	2	300	4	2/47	75.00	6.00	75.0	0	0
James Harris	3	3	26.0	0	153	3	2/42	51.00	5.88	52.0	0	0
Andrew Salter	7	6	37.4	1	172	3	1/28	57.33	4.56	75.3	0	0
Jim Allenby	7	7	53.0	2	223	2	1/35	111.50	4.20	159.0	0	0
Dewi Penrhyn Jones	1	1	3.0	0	22	1	1/22	22.00	7.33	18.0	0	0
Jacques Rudolph	8	2	7.0	0	51	1	1/32	51.00	7.28	42.0	0	0
Will Bragg	5	1	2.0	0	14	0	–	–	7.00	–	0	0

Twenty20
Player	Matches	Innings	Overs	Maidens	Runs	Wickets	BBI	Ave	Econ	SR	4w	5w
Michael Hogan	14	13	51.0	0	410	21	3/30	19.52	8.03	14.5	0	0
Graham Wagg	9	8	32.0	0	274	13	3/28	21.07	8.56	14.7	0	0
Andrew Salter	12	12	36.0	0	280	9	2/19	31.11	7.77	24.0	0	0
Will Owen	10	9	28.3	0	289	9	3/32	32.11	10.14	19.0	0	0
Jim Allenby	15	13	41.4	0	321	7	2/16	45.85	7.70	35.7	0	0
Dean Cosker	15	14	52.0	0	444	7	2/25	63.42	8.53	44.5	0	0
Darren Sammy	6	6	23.0	0	191	4	2/29	47.75	8.30	34.5	0	0
Jacques Rudolph	15	7	12.0	0	93	1	1/13	93.00	7.75	72.0	0	0
