= 2014 T20 Blast =

2014 NatWest t20 Blast
- Dates: 16 May 2014 – 23 August 2014
- Administrator: England and Wales Cricket Board
- Cricket format: Twenty20
- Tournament format(s): Group stage and knockout
- Champions: Birmingham Bears (1st title)
- Participants: 18
- Matches: 133
- Attendance: 704,205 (5,295 per match)
- Most runs: Jason Roy, Surrey (677)
- Most wickets: Jeetan Patel, Birmingham Bears (25)
- Official website: NatWest T20 Blast

The 2014 NatWest T20 Blast was the twelfth edition of the T20 Blast, the English Twenty20 cricket competition. The competition ran from 16 May 2014 until Finals Day at Edgbaston on 23 August, which was won by Birmingham Bears. The competition replaced the Friends Life t20 competition. With attendance figures over 700,000, it was the most attended season of T20 cricket in England since the format began in 2003.

== Format ==
The 18 teams were divided into two groups of nine. In the style of a round-robin tournament, each team played six other teams in their group both home and away. The other two teams were faced just once. The top four teams from each group qualified for the knockout stage: a three-round single-elimination tournament. The winner of each group had a home match in the quarter-finals against the fourth team from the other group. The runners-up from each group played at home against the third placed team from the other group. The semi-finals were a free draw from all the qualified teams. Finals Day will be again be held at Edgbaston.

== North Division ==
=== Table ===
Pos	Team	Pld	W	L	T	NR	Ded	Pts	NRR
1	Lancashire Lightning	14	10	2	0	2	0	22	0.846
2	Nottinghamshire Outlaws	14	9	3	0	2	0	20	0.642
3	Worcestershire Rapids	14	8	4	0	2	0	18	0.480
4	Birmingham Bears	14	7	5	0	2	0	16	0.235
5	Yorkshire Vikings	14	6	5	0	3	0	15	0.588
6	Durham Jets	14	5	7	0	2	0	12	0.106
7	Northamptonshire Steelbacks	14	4	7	0	3	0	11	−0.899
8	Leicestershire Foxes	14	4	9	0	1	0	9	−0.552
9	Derbyshire Falcons	14	1	12	0	1	0	3	−1.406

=== Results ===
Home \ Away	Birmingham Bears	Derbyshire Falcons	Durham Jets	Lancashire Lightning	Leicestershire Foxes	Northamptonshire Steelbacks	Nottinghamshire Outlaws	Worcestershire Rapids	Yorkshire Vikings
Birmingham Bears			Birmingham Bears; 6 wickets	Abandoned; No result	Birmingham Bears; 52 runs	Birmingham Bears; 8 wickets	Nottinghamshire Outlaws; 6 runs	Birmingham Bears; 5 wickets	Abandoned; No result
Derbyshire Falcons	Derbyshire Falcons; 3 wickets			Lancashire Lightning; 20 runs	Leicestershire Foxes; 5 wickets	Abandoned; No result	Nottinghamshire Outlaws; 5 wickets	Worcestershire Rapids; 8 runs	Yorkshire Vikings; 59 runs
Durham Jets		Durham Jets; 8 wickets		Lancashire Lightning; 1 run	Leicestershire Foxes; 4 wickets	Durham Jets; 5 wickets	Abandoned; No result	Durham Jets; 29 runs	Yorkshire Vikings; 49 runs
Lancashire Lightning	Lancashire Lightning; 15 runs	Lancashire Lightning; 35 runs	Lancashire Lightning; 27 runs		Lancashire Lightning; 9 runs	Lancashire Lightning; 53 runs		Lancashire Lightning; 12 runs	Yorkshire Vikings; 5 wickets
Leicestershire Foxes	Birmingham Bears; 25 runs	Leicestershire Foxes; 27 runs	Leicestershire Foxes; 3 wickets	Lancashire Lightning; 18 runs		Abandoned; No result	Nottinghamshire Outlaws; 24 runs	Worcestershire Rapids; 6 wickets	
Northamptonshire Steelbacks	Northamptonshire Steelbacks; 15 runs	Northamptonshire Steelbacks; 4 wickets	Abandoned; No result		Northamptonshire Steelbacks; 2 wickets		Nottinghamshire Outlaws; 22 runs	Worcestershire Rapids; 31 runs	Yorkshire Vikings; 16 runs
Nottinghamshire Outlaws	Birmingham Bears; 18 runs	Nottinghamshire Outlaws; 27 runs	Durham Jets; 3 runs	Nottinghamshire Outlaws; 33 runs	Nottinghamshire Outlaws; 31 runs			Worcestershire Rapids; 24 runs	Nottinghamshire Outlaws; 22 runs
Worcestershire Rapids	Worcestershire Rapids; 8 wickets	Worcestershire Rapids; 28 runs	Worcestershire Rapids; 5 wickets	Lancashire Lightning; 50 runs		Worcestershire Rapids; 5 wickets	Abandoned; No result		Abandoned; No result
Yorkshire Vikings	Birmingham Bears; 5 wickets	Yorkshire Vikings; 8 wickets	Durham Jets; 28 runs	Abandoned; No result	Yorkshire Vikings; 14 runs	Northamptonshire Steelbacks; 3 wickets	Nottinghamshire Outlaws; 6 wickets		

Home team win	Away team win	Match tied	Match abandoned

=== Fixtures ===
==== May ====
16 May	Durham Jets (H); 173/4 (20 overs)	v	Worcestershire Rapids; 144 (19 overs)	Durham Jets won by 29 runs
Scorecard	Durham Jets (H); 173/4 (20 overs)	v	Worcestershire Rapids; 144 (19 overs)	Riverside Ground, Chester-le-Street; Umpires: Michael Gough and Steve Garratt; Player of the match: Paul Collingwood (Durham Jets)
Scorecard	Paul Collingwood 62 (38); Jack Shantry 2/25 (4 overs)		Richard Oliver 43 (31); Paul Collingwood 3/29 (4 overs)	Riverside Ground, Chester-le-Street; Umpires: Michael Gough and Steve Garratt; Player of the match: Paul Collingwood (Durham Jets)
Worcestershire Rapids won the toss and elected to field.				Riverside Ground, Chester-le-Street; Umpires: Michael Gough and Steve Garratt; Player of the match: Paul Collingwood (Durham Jets)

16 May	Yorkshire Vikings (H); 162/7 (20 overs)	v	Northamptonshire Steelbacks; 165/7 (19.5 overs)	Northamptonshire Steelbacks won by 3 wickets
Scorecard	Yorkshire Vikings (H); 162/7 (20 overs)	v	Northamptonshire Steelbacks; 165/7 (19.5 overs)	Headingley, Leeds; Umpires: David Millns and Neil Mallender; Player of the match: Ian Butler (Northamptonshire Steelbacks)
Scorecard	Liam Plunkett 36 (22); Ian Butler 4/25 (4 overs)		David Willey 43 (28); Liam Plunkett 2/20 (3 overs)	Headingley, Leeds; Umpires: David Millns and Neil Mallender; Player of the match: Ian Butler (Northamptonshire Steelbacks)
Yorkshire Vikings won the toss and elected to bat.				Headingley, Leeds; Umpires: David Millns and Neil Mallender; Player of the match: Ian Butler (Northamptonshire Steelbacks)

16 May	Leicestershire Foxes (H); 197/4 (20 overs)	v	Derbyshire Falcons; 170/7 (20 overs)	Leicestershire Foxes won by 27 runs
Scorecard	Leicestershire Foxes (H); 197/4 (20 overs)	v	Derbyshire Falcons; 170/7 (20 overs)	Grace Road, Leicester; Umpires: Paul Baldwin and Rob Bailey; Player of the match: Marcus North (Derbyshire Falcons)
Scorecard	Scott Styris 63* (31); Chesney Hughes 1/28 (4 overs)		Marcus North 90 (47); Nathan Buck 3/26 (4 overs)	Grace Road, Leicester; Umpires: Paul Baldwin and Rob Bailey; Player of the match: Marcus North (Derbyshire Falcons)
Derbyshire Falcons won the toss and elected to field.				Grace Road, Leicester; Umpires: Paul Baldwin and Rob Bailey; Player of the match: Marcus North (Derbyshire Falcons)

16 May	Nottinghamshire Outlaws (H); 182/5 (20 overs)	v	Lancashire Lightning; 149 (18.3 overs)	Nottinghamshire Outlaws won by 33 runs
Scorecard	Nottinghamshire Outlaws (H); 182/5 (20 overs)	v	Lancashire Lightning; 149 (18.3 overs)	Trent Bridge, Nottingham; Umpires: Jeff Evans and Peter Willey; Player of the match: Samit Patel (Nottinghamshire Outlaws)
Scorecard	Samit Patel 56 (41); Jordan Clark 1/18 (1 over)		Jordan Clark 44 (20); Steven Mullaney 3/46 (4 overs)	Trent Bridge, Nottingham; Umpires: Jeff Evans and Peter Willey; Player of the match: Samit Patel (Nottinghamshire Outlaws)
Lancashire Lightning won the toss and elected to field.; Shown live on Sky Sports				Trent Bridge, Nottingham; Umpires: Jeff Evans and Peter Willey; Player of the match: Samit Patel (Nottinghamshire Outlaws)

17 May	Lancashire Lightning (H); 194/3 (20 overs)	v	Worcestershire Rapids; 182/5 (20 overs)	Lancashire Lightning won by 12 runs
Scorecard	Lancashire Lightning (H); 194/3 (20 overs)	v	Worcestershire Rapids; 182/5 (20 overs)	Old Trafford, Manchester; Umpires: Neil Bainton and Nigel Cowley; Player of the match: Paul Horton (Lancashire Lightning)
Scorecard	Tom Smith 74 (53); Charlie Morris 2/44 (4 overs)		Colin Munro 39 (33); Jordan Clark 2/30 (4 overs)	Old Trafford, Manchester; Umpires: Neil Bainton and Nigel Cowley; Player of the match: Paul Horton (Lancashire Lightning)
Lancashire Lightning won the toss and elected to bat.				Old Trafford, Manchester; Umpires: Neil Bainton and Nigel Cowley; Player of the match: Paul Horton (Lancashire Lightning)

23 May	Worcestershire Rapids; 163/6 (20 overs)	v	Nottinghamshire Outlaws (H); 139/9 (20 overs)	Worcestershire Rapids won by 24 runs
Scorecard	Worcestershire Rapids; 163/6 (20 overs)	v	Nottinghamshire Outlaws (H); 139/9 (20 overs)	Trent Bridge, Nottingham

23 May	Leicestershire Foxes; 176/4 (18 overs)	v	Northamptonshire Steelbacks (H); 179/8 (17.4 overs)	Northamptonshire Steelbacks won by 2 wickets (D/L method)
Scorecard	Leicestershire Foxes; 176/4 (18 overs)	v	Northamptonshire Steelbacks (H); 179/8 (17.4 overs)	County Ground, Northampton

23 May	Birmingham Bears (H)	v	Yorkshire Vikings	Match abandoned
Scorecard	Birmingham Bears (H)	v	Yorkshire Vikings	Edgbaston, Birmingham
Shown live on Sky Sports				Edgbaston, Birmingham

23 May	Lancashire Lightning; 169/3 (19 overs)	v	Derbyshire Falcons (H); 149/5 (19 overs)	Lancashire Lightning won by 20 runs (D/L method)
Scorecard	Lancashire Lightning; 169/3 (19 overs)	v	Derbyshire Falcons (H); 149/5 (19 overs)	County Ground, Derby

29 May	Lancashire Lightning; 133/6 (20 overs)	v	Durham Jets (H); 132/7 (20 overs)	Lancashire Lightning won by 1 run
Scorecard	Lancashire Lightning; 133/6 (20 overs)	v	Durham Jets (H); 132/7 (20 overs)	Riverside Ground, Chester-le-Street

29 May	Derbyshire Falcons (H)	v	Northamptonshire Steelbacks	Match abandoned
Scorecard	Derbyshire Falcons (H)	v	Northamptonshire Steelbacks	County Ground, Derby
Shown live on Sky Sports				County Ground, Derby

30 May	Northamptonshire Steelbacks; 134/7 (20 overs)	v	Worcestershire Rapids (H); 138/5 (14.1 overs)	Worcestershire Rapids won by 5 wickets
Scorecard	Northamptonshire Steelbacks; 134/7 (20 overs)	v	Worcestershire Rapids (H); 138/5 (14.1 overs)	New Road, Worcester

30 May	Derbyshire Falcons; 127/6 (20 overs)	v	Yorkshire Vikings (H); 128/2 (14 overs)	Yorkshire Vikings won by 8 wickets
Scorecard	Derbyshire Falcons; 127/6 (20 overs)	v	Yorkshire Vikings (H); 128/2 (14 overs)	Headingley, Leeds

30 May	Durham Jets; 132/8 (20 overs)	v	Nottinghamshire Outlaws (H); 129/7 (20 overs)	Durham Jets won by 3 runs
Scorecard	Durham Jets; 132/8 (20 overs)	v	Nottinghamshire Outlaws (H); 129/7 (20 overs)	Trent Bridge, Nottingham

30 May	Lancashire Lightning (H); 126 (19.5 overs)	v	Birmingham Bears; 111 (20 overs)	Lancashire Lightning won by 15 runs
Scorecard	Lancashire Lightning (H); 126 (19.5 overs)	v	Birmingham Bears; 111 (20 overs)	Old Trafford, Manchester

==== June ====
1 June	Birmingham Bears; 175/9 (20 overs)	v	Leicestershire Foxes (H); 150/6 (20 overs)	Birmingham Bears won by 25 runs
Scorecard	Birmingham Bears; 175/9 (20 overs)	v	Leicestershire Foxes (H); 150/6 (20 overs)	Grace Road, Leicester
Shown live on Sky Sports				Grace Road, Leicester

6 June	Leicestershire Foxes (H); 164/6 (20 overs)	v	Worcestershire Rapids; 167/5 (19.2 overs)	Worcestershire Rapids won by 6 wickets
Scorecard	Leicestershire Foxes (H); 164/6 (20 overs)	v	Worcestershire Rapids; 167/5 (19.2 overs)	Grace Road, Leicester

6 June	Lancashire Lightning (H); 179/6 (20 overs)	v	Yorkshire Vikings; 180/5 (19.3 overs)	Yorkshire Vikings won by 5 wickets
Scorecard	Lancashire Lightning (H); 179/6 (20 overs)	v	Yorkshire Vikings; 180/5 (19.3 overs)	Old Trafford, Manchester
Shown live on Sky Sports				Old Trafford, Manchester

6 June	Durham Jets; 146/7 (20 overs)	v	Birmingham Bears (H); 147/4 (19.1 overs)	Birmingham Bears won by 6 wickets
Scorecard	Durham Jets; 146/7 (20 overs)	v	Birmingham Bears (H); 147/4 (19.1 overs)	Edgbaston, Birmingham

6 June	Derbyshire Falcons (H); 164/7 (20 overs)	v	Nottinghamshire Outlaws; 165/5 (16.5 overs)	Nottinghamshire Outlaws won by 5 wickets
Scorecard	Derbyshire Falcons (H); 164/7 (20 overs)	v	Nottinghamshire Outlaws; 165/5 (16.5 overs)	County Ground, Derby

7 June	Durham Jets; 105/3 (13 overs)	v	Worcestershire Rapids (H); 107/5 (12.4 overs)	Worcestershire Rapids won by 5 wickets
Scorecard	Durham Jets; 105/3 (13 overs)	v	Worcestershire Rapids (H); 107/5 (12.4 overs)	New Road, Worcester
Shown live on Sky Sports				New Road, Worcester

13 June	Birmingham Bears; 156/5 (20 overs)	v	Nottinghamshire Outlaws (H); 138/7 (20 overs)	Birmingham Bears won by 18 runs
Scorecard	Birmingham Bears; 156/5 (20 overs)	v	Nottinghamshire Outlaws (H); 138/7 (20 overs)	Trent Bridge, Nottingham

13 June	Lancashire Lightning (H); 166/7 (20 overs)	v	Leicestershire Foxes; 157/7 (20 overs)	Lancashire Lightning won by 9 runs
Scorecard	Lancashire Lightning (H); 166/7 (20 overs)	v	Leicestershire Foxes; 157/7 (20 overs)	Old Trafford, Manchester

13 June	Yorkshire Vikings; 181/3 (20 overs)	v	Northamptonshire Steelbacks (H); 165/9 (20 overs)	Yorkshire Vikings won by 16 runs
Scorecard	Yorkshire Vikings; 181/3 (20 overs)	v	Northamptonshire Steelbacks (H); 165/9 (20 overs)	County Ground, Northampton

13 June	Worcestershire Rapids; 177/5 (20 overs)	v	Derbyshire Falcons (H); 169/8 (20 overs)	Worcestershire Rapids won by 8 runs
Scorecard	Worcestershire Rapids; 177/5 (20 overs)	v	Derbyshire Falcons (H); 169/8 (20 overs)	County Ground, Derby

19 June	Northamptonshire Steelbacks; 133/7 (20 overs)	v	Birmingham Bears (H); 136/2 (16 overs)	Birmingham Bears won by 8 wickets
Scorecard	Northamptonshire Steelbacks; 133/7 (20 overs)	v	Birmingham Bears (H); 136/2 (16 overs)	Edgbaston, Birmingham
Shown live on Sky Sports				Edgbaston, Birmingham

19 June	Nottinghamshire Outlaws; 220/4 (20 overs)	v	Leicestershire Foxes (H); 196/5 (20 overs)	Nottinghamshire Outlaws won by 24 runs
Scorecard	Nottinghamshire Outlaws; 220/4 (20 overs)	v	Leicestershire Foxes (H); 196/5 (20 overs)	Grace Road, Leicester

20 June	Durham Jets (H); 177/7 (20 overs)	v	Leicestershire Foxes; 178/6 (19.1 overs)	Leicestershire Foxes won by 4 wickets
Scorecard	Durham Jets (H); 177/7 (20 overs)	v	Leicestershire Foxes; 178/6 (19.1 overs)	Riverside Ground, Chester-le-Street

20 June	Birmingham Bears; 133/8 (20 overs)	v	Worcestershire Rapids (H); 134/2 (14.3 overs)	Worcestershire Rapids won by 8 wickets
Scorecard	Birmingham Bears; 133/8 (20 overs)	v	Worcestershire Rapids (H); 134/2 (14.3 overs)	New Road, Worcester

20 June	Nottinghamshire Outlaws (H); 206/5 (20 overs)	v	Derbyshire Falcons; 179/7 (20 overs)	Nottinghamshire Outlaws won by 27 runs
Scorecard	Nottinghamshire Outlaws (H); 206/5 (20 overs)	v	Derbyshire Falcons; 179/7 (20 overs)	Trent Bridge, Nottingham

20 June	Lancashire Lightning (H); 187/3 (20 overs)	v	Northamptonshire Steelbacks; 134 (18.5 overs)	Lancashire Lightning won by 53 runs
Scorecard	Lancashire Lightning (H); 187/3 (20 overs)	v	Northamptonshire Steelbacks; 134 (18.5 overs)	Old Trafford, Manchester

27 June	Worcestershire Rapids (H)	v	Nottinghamshire Outlaws	Match abandoned
Scorecard	Worcestershire Rapids (H)	v	Nottinghamshire Outlaws	New Road, Worcester

27 June	Yorkshire Vikings (H)	v	Lancashire Lightning	Match abandoned
Scorecard	Yorkshire Vikings (H)	v	Lancashire Lightning	Headingley, Leeds
Shown live on Sky Sports				Headingley, Leeds

27 June	Durham Jets; 69/4 (10 overs)	v	Northamptonshire Steelbacks (H)	No result
Scorecard	Durham Jets; 69/4 (10 overs)	v	Northamptonshire Steelbacks (H)	County Ground, Northampton

27 June	Birmingham Bears; 189/5 (20 overs)	v	Derbyshire Falcons (H); 193/7 (19 overs)	Derbyshire Falcons won by 3 wickets
Scorecard	Birmingham Bears; 189/5 (20 overs)	v	Derbyshire Falcons (H); 193/7 (19 overs)	County Ground, Derby

28 June	Nottinghamshire Outlaws (H); 143/9 (20 overs)	v	Yorkshire Vikings; 121/9 (20 overs)	Nottinghamshire Outlaws won by 22 runs
Scorecard	Nottinghamshire Outlaws (H); 143/9 (20 overs)	v	Yorkshire Vikings; 121/9 (20 overs)	Trent Bridge, Nottingham
Shown live on Sky Sports				Trent Bridge, Nottingham

29 June	Derbyshire Falcons; 125 (19.1 overs)	v	Durham Jets (H); 129/2 (13.2 overs)	Durham Jets won by 8 wickets
Scorecard	Derbyshire Falcons; 125 (19.1 overs)	v	Durham Jets (H); 129/2 (13.2 overs)	Riverside Ground, Chester-le-Street
Shown live on Sky Sports				Riverside Ground, Chester-le-Street

==== July ====
1 July	Yorkshire Vikings (H); 168/5 (20 overs)	v	Leicestershire Foxes; 154/8 (20 overs)	Yorkshire Vikings won by 14 runs
Scorecard	Yorkshire Vikings (H); 168/5 (20 overs)	v	Leicestershire Foxes; 154/8 (20 overs)	Headingley, Leeds
Shown live on Sky Sports				Headingley, Leeds

2 July	Durham Jets; 123/9 (20 overs)	v	Yorkshire (H); 95 (17.2 overs)	Durham Jets won by 28 runs
Scorecard	Durham Jets; 123/9 (20 overs)	v	Yorkshire (H); 95 (17.2 overs)	Headingley, Leeds

3 July	Northamptonshire Steelbacks (H); 139/8 (20 overs)	v	Birmingham Bears; 124/9 (20 overs)	Northamptonshire Steelbacks won by 15 runs
Scorecard	Northamptonshire Steelbacks (H); 139/8 (20 overs)	v	Birmingham Bears; 124/9 (20 overs)	County Ground, Northampton
Shown live on Sky Sports				County Ground, Northampton

4 July	Durham Jets (H)	v	Nottinghamshire Outlaws	Match abandoned
Scorecard	Durham Jets (H)	v	Nottinghamshire Outlaws	Riverside Ground, Chester-le-Street

4 July	Northamptonshire Steelbacks; 82 (16.2 overs)	v	Leicestershire Foxes (H)	No result
Scorecard	Northamptonshire Steelbacks; 82 (16.2 overs)	v	Leicestershire Foxes (H)	Grace Road, Leicester

4 July	Worcestershire Rapids (H)	v	Yorkshire Vikings	Match abandoned
Scorecard	Worcestershire Rapids (H)	v	Yorkshire Vikings	New Road, Worcester

4 July	Birmingham Bears (H)	v	Lancashire Lightning	Match abandoned
Scorecard	Birmingham Bears (H)	v	Lancashire Lightning	Edgbaston, Birmingham

6 July	Derbyshire Falcons (H); 143 (20 overs)	v	Leicestershire Foxes; 144/5 (19.2 overs)	Leicestershire Foxes won by 5 wickets
Scorecard	Derbyshire Falcons (H); 143 (20 overs)	v	Leicestershire Foxes; 144/5 (19.2 overs)	Queen's Park, Chesterfield

6 July	Lancashire Lightning; 229/4 (20 overs)	v	Worcestershire Rapids (H); 179/7 (20 overs)	Lancashire Lightning won by 50 runs
Scorecard	Lancashire Lightning; 229/4 (20 overs)	v	Worcestershire Rapids (H); 179/7 (20 overs)	New Road, Worcester

8 July	Nottinghamshire Outlaws; 158/9 (20 overs)	v	Birmingham Bears (H); 152/6 (20 overs)	Nottinghamshire Outlaws won by 6 runs
Scorecard	Nottinghamshire Outlaws; 158/9 (20 overs)	v	Birmingham Bears (H); 152/6 (20 overs)	Edgbaston, Birmingham
Shown live on Sky Sports				Edgbaston, Birmingham

11 July	Yorkshire Vikings; 186/8 (20 overs)	v	Durham Jets (H); 137 (19.4 overs)	Yorkshire Vikings won by 49 runs
Scorecard	Yorkshire Vikings; 186/8 (20 overs)	v	Durham Jets (H); 137 (19.4 overs)	Riverside Ground, Chester-le-Street

11 July	Lancashire Lightning; 151/7 (20 overs)	v	Leicestershire Foxes (H); 133 (19.4 overs)	Lancashire Lightning won by 18 runs
Scorecard	Lancashire Lightning; 151/7 (20 overs)	v	Leicestershire Foxes (H); 133 (19.4 overs)	Grace Road, Leicester

11 July	Derbyshire Falcons; 191/6 (20 overs)	v	Northamptonshire Steelbacks (H); 192/6 (19.2 overs)	Northamptonshire Steelbacks won by 4 wickets
Scorecard	Derbyshire Falcons; 191/6 (20 overs)	v	Northamptonshire Steelbacks (H); 192/6 (19.2 overs)	County Ground, Northampton

11 July	Worcestershire Rapids; 175/6 (20 overs)	v	Birmingham Bears (H); 176/5 (19.2 overs)	Birmingham Bears won by 5 wickets
Scorecard	Worcestershire Rapids; 175/6 (20 overs)	v	Birmingham Bears (H); 176/5 (19.2 overs)	Edgbaston, Birmingham

13 July	Yorkshire Vikings; 183/4 (20 overs)	v	Derbyshire Falcons (H); 124 (17.3 overs)	Yorkshire Vikings won by 59 runs
Scorecard	Yorkshire Vikings; 183/4 (20 overs)	v	Derbyshire Falcons (H); 124 (17.3 overs)	Queen's Park, Chesterfield

18 July	Durham Jets; 117/9 (20 overs)	v	Leicestershire Foxes (H); 120/7 (19.5 overs)	Leicestershire Foxes won by 3 wickets
Scorecard	Durham Jets; 117/9 (20 overs)	v	Leicestershire Foxes (H); 120/7 (19.5 overs)	Grace Road, Leicester

18 July	Yorkshire Vikings (H); 147/6 (20 overs)	v	Birmingham Bears; 148/5 (19.4 overs)	Birmingham Bears won by 5 wickets
Scorecard	Yorkshire Vikings (H); 147/6 (20 overs)	v	Birmingham Bears; 148/5 (19.4 overs)	Headingley, Leeds

18 July	Lancashire Lightning (H); 225/7 (20 overs)	v	Derbyshire Falcons; 190/7 (20 overs)	Lancashire Lightning won by 35 runs
Scorecard	Lancashire Lightning (H); 225/7 (20 overs)	v	Derbyshire Falcons; 190/7 (20 overs)	Old Trafford, Manchester

18 July	Worcestershire Rapids; 162/9 (20 overs)	v	Northamptonshire Steelbacks (H); 131 (18.3 overs)	Worcestershire Rapids won by 31 runs
Scorecard	Worcestershire Rapids; 162/9 (20 overs)	v	Northamptonshire Steelbacks (H); 131 (18.3 overs)	County Ground, Northampton

20 July	Nottinghamshire Outlaws (H); 121/9 (20 overs)	v	Leicestershire Foxes; 90 (18.3 overs)	Nottinghamshire Outlaws won by 31 runs
Scorecard	Nottinghamshire Outlaws (H); 121/9 (20 overs)	v	Leicestershire Foxes; 90 (18.3 overs)	Trent Bridge, Nottingham

23 July	Nottinghamshire Outlaws; 174/6 (20 overs)	v	Northamptonshire Steelbacks (H); 152/7 (20 overs)	Nottinghamshire Outlaws won by 22 runs
Scorecard	Nottinghamshire Outlaws; 174/6 (20 overs)	v	Northamptonshire Steelbacks (H); 152/7 (20 overs)	County Ground, Northampton
Shown live on Sky Sports				County Ground, Northampton

24 July	Lancashire Lightning (H); 164/8 (20 overs)	v	Durham Jets; 137/7 (20 overs)	Lancashire Lightning won by 27 runs
Scorecard	Lancashire Lightning (H); 164/8 (20 overs)	v	Durham Jets; 137/7 (20 overs)	Old Trafford, Manchester

25 July	Northamptonshire Steelbacks; 195/3 (20 overs)	v	Durham Jets (H); 199/5 (19.1 overs)	Durham Jets won by 5 wickets
Scorecard	Northamptonshire Steelbacks; 195/3 (20 overs)	v	Durham Jets (H); 199/5 (19.1 overs)	Riverside Ground, Chester-le-Street

25 July	Birmingham Bears (H); 160/6 (20 overs)	v	Leicestershire Foxes; 108 (19.5 overs)	Birmingham Bears won by 52 runs
Scorecard	Birmingham Bears (H); 160/6 (20 overs)	v	Leicestershire Foxes; 108 (19.5 overs)	Edgbaston, Birmingham

25 July	Worcestershire Rapids (H); 209/4 (20 overs)	v	Derbyshire Falcons; 181/7 (20 overs)	Worcestershire Rapids won by 28 runs
Scorecard	Worcestershire Rapids (H); 209/4 (20 overs)	v	Derbyshire Falcons; 181/7 (20 overs)	New Road, Worcester

25 July	Yorkshire Vikings (H); 200/5 (20 overs)	v	Nottinghamshire Outlaws; 201/4 (19.2 overs)	Nottinghamshire Outlaws won by 6 wickets
Scorecard	Yorkshire Vikings (H); 200/5 (20 overs)	v	Nottinghamshire Outlaws; 201/4 (19.2 overs)	Headingley, Leeds

== South Division ==
=== Table ===
Pos	Team	Pld	W	L	T	NR	Ded	Pts	NRR
1	Essex Eagles	14	10	4	0	0	0	20	0.401
2	Surrey	14	9	5	0	0	0	18	0.426
3	Hampshire	14	9	5	0	0	0	18	0.136
4	Glamorgan	14	6	5	1	2	0	15	0.145
5	Somerset	14	6	7	0	1	0	13	−0.107
6	Kent Spitfires	14	6	7	1	0	0	13	−0.229
7	Sussex Sharks	14	6	8	0	0	0	12	−0.022
8	Gloucestershire Gladiators	14	5	7	0	2	2	10	−0.362
9	Middlesex Panthers	14	2	11	0	1	0	5	−0.457

Deductions

- Gloucestershire were docked 2 points before the start of season after preparing an unfit pitch in 2013.

=== Results ===
Home \ Away	Essex Eagles	Glamorgan	Gloucestershire Gladiators	Hampshire	Kent Spitfires	Middlesex Panthers	Somerset	Surrey	Sussex Sharks
Essex Eagles		Essex Eagles; 4 wickets	Essex Eagles; 8 wickets	Hampshire; 5 wickets	Essex Eagles; 63 runs	Essex Eagles; 2 wickets		Essex Eagles; 5 wickets	Sussex Sharks; 7 wickets
Glamorgan	Essex Eagles; 7 wickets		Glamorgan; 8 wickets	Hampshire; 6 runs	Match tied		Abandoned; No result	Surrey; 17 runs	Glamorgan; 5 wickets
Gloucestershire Gladiators	Gloucestershire Gladiators; 6 wickets	Abandoned; No result			Gloucestershire Gladiators; 3 wickets	Gloucestershire Gladiators; 5 wickets	Somerset; 18 runs	Surrey; 5 runs	Gloucestershire Gladiators; 13 runs
Hampshire	Hampshire; 8 wickets	Glamorgan; 10 runs	Hampshire; 2 runs		Hampshire; 22 runs	Middlesex Panthers; 50 runs	Somerset; 39 runs		Hampshire; 6 runs
Kent Spitfires	Essex Eagles; 6 wickets		Kent Spitfires; 21 runs	Hampshire; 47 runs		Kent Spitfires; 16 runs	Kent Spitfires; 40 runs	Kent Spitfires; 21 runs	Sussex Sharks; 35 runs
Middlesex Panthers	Essex Eagles; 8 wickets	Glamorgan; 6 wickets	Abandoned; No result	Hampshire; 47 runs			Middlesex Panthers; 8 wickets	Surrey; 2 wickets	Sussex Sharks; 13 runs
Somerset	Essex Eagles; 8 wickets	Glamorgan; 7 runs	Somerset; 7 runs	Somerset; 1 run	Kent Spitfires; 42 runs	Somerset; 22 runs		Surrey; 14 runs	
Surrey	Essex Eagles; 5 wickets	Glamorgan; 4 runs		Surrey; 8 wickets	Surrey; 8 wickets	Surrey; 6 wickets	Surrey; 3 wickets		Surrey; 10 wickets
Sussex Sharks		Sussex Sharks; 5 wickets	Gloucestershire Gladiators; 4 runs	Hampshire; 18 runs	Kent Spitfires; 3 runs	Sussex Sharks; 6 wickets	Somerset; 34 runs	Sussex Sharks; 2 wickets	

Home team win	Away team win	Match tied	Match abandoned

=== Fixtures ===
==== May ====
16 May	Somerset; 156/8 (20 overs)	v	Gloucestershire Gladiators (H); 138 (18.4 overs)	Somerset won by 18 runs
Scorecard	Somerset; 156/8 (20 overs)	v	Gloucestershire Gladiators (H); 138 (18.4 overs)	County Ground, Bristol; Umpires: Alex Wharf and Mark Benson; Player of the match: Alviro Petersen (Somerset)
Scorecard	Craig Kieswetter 55 (48); James Fuller 4/32 (4 overs)		Hamish Marshall 54 (37); Dirk Nannes 4/21 (3.4 overs)	County Ground, Bristol; Umpires: Alex Wharf and Mark Benson; Player of the match: Alviro Petersen (Somerset)
Gloucestershire Gladiators won the toss and elected to field.				County Ground, Bristol; Umpires: Alex Wharf and Mark Benson; Player of the match: Alviro Petersen (Somerset)

16 May	Glamorgan; 161/7 (20 overs)	v	Hampshire (H); 151/6 (20 overs)	Glamorgan won by 10 runs
Scorecard	Glamorgan; 161/7 (20 overs)	v	Hampshire (H); 151/6 (20 overs)	The Rose Bowl, Southampton; Umpires: Martin Saggers and Peter Hartley; Player of the match: Jacques Rudolph (Glamorgan)
Scorecard	Jacques Rudolph 34 (21); Danny Briggs 3/26 (4 overs)		Matt Coles 42 (29); Will Owen 3/32 (4 overs)	The Rose Bowl, Southampton; Umpires: Martin Saggers and Peter Hartley; Player of the match: Jacques Rudolph (Glamorgan)
Hampshire won the toss and elected to field.				The Rose Bowl, Southampton; Umpires: Martin Saggers and Peter Hartley; Player of the match: Jacques Rudolph (Glamorgan)

16 May	Surrey; 171/7 (20 overs)	v	Sussex Sharks (H); 172/8 (20 overs)	Sussex Sharks won by 2 wickets
Scorecard	Surrey; 171/7 (20 overs)	v	Sussex Sharks (H); 172/8 (20 overs)	County Ground, Hove; Umpires: Ian Gould and Steve O'Shaughnessy; Player of the match: Luke Wright (Sussex Sharks)
Scorecard	Jason Roy 57 (43); Ashar Zaidi 3/32 (4 overs)		Luke Wright 56 (31); Kevin O'Brien 2/22 (4 overs)	County Ground, Hove; Umpires: Ian Gould and Steve O'Shaughnessy; Player of the match: Luke Wright (Sussex Sharks)
Surrey won the toss and elected to bat.				County Ground, Hove; Umpires: Ian Gould and Steve O'Shaughnessy; Player of the match: Luke Wright (Sussex Sharks)

17 May	Middlesex Panthers (H); 180/5 (20 overs)	v	Essex Eagles; 181/2 (18.5 overs)	Essex Eagles won by 8 wickets
Scorecard	Middlesex Panthers (H); 180/5 (20 overs)	v	Essex Eagles; 181/2 (18.5 overs)	Lord's, London; Umpires: Richard Illingworth and Richard Kettleborough; Player of the match: Mark Pettini (Essex Eagles)
Scorecard	Dawid Malan 86* (57); Reece Topley 3/26 (4 overs)		Mark Pettini 95* (54); Ravi Patel 2/26 (4 overs)	Lord's, London; Umpires: Richard Illingworth and Richard Kettleborough; Player of the match: Mark Pettini (Essex Eagles)
Essex Eagles won the toss and elected to field.; Shown live on Sky Sports				Lord's, London; Umpires: Richard Illingworth and Richard Kettleborough; Player of the match: Mark Pettini (Essex Eagles)

17 May	Sussex Sharks; 128 (19.4 overs)	v	Middlesex Panthers (H); 115/6 (20 overs)	Sussex Sharks won by 13 runs
Scorecard	Sussex Sharks; 128 (19.4 overs)	v	Middlesex Panthers (H); 115/6 (20 overs)	Lord's, London
Scorecard	Chris Jordan 25 (20); Toby Roland-Jones 3/25 (3.4 overs)		Eoin Morgan 30 (29); Steffan Piolet 2/15 (4 overs)	Lord's, London
Shown live on Sky Sports				Lord's, London

18 May	Surrey; 173/7 (20 overs)	v	Somerset (H); 159/6 (20 overs)	Surrey won by 14 runs
Scorecard	Surrey; 173/7 (20 overs)	v	Somerset (H); 159/6 (20 overs)	County Ground, Taunton
Shown live on Sky Sports				County Ground, Taunton

23 May	Middlesex Panthers; 111/8 (20 overs)	v	Gloucestershire Gladiators (H); 113/5 (17.3 overs)	Gloucestershire Gladiators won by 5 wickets
Scorecard	Middlesex Panthers; 111/8 (20 overs)	v	Gloucestershire Gladiators (H); 113/5 (17.3 overs)	County Ground, Bristol

23 May	Kent Spitfires; 164/5 (13 overs)	v	Somerset (H); 122/5 (13 overs)	Kent Spitfires won by 42 runs (D/L method)
Scorecard	Kent Spitfires; 164/5 (13 overs)	v	Somerset (H); 122/5 (13 overs)	County Ground, Taunton

23 May	Glamorgan; 189/6 (20 overs)	v	Essex Eagles (H); 195/6 (19.4 overs)	Essex Eagles won by 4 wickets (D/L method)
Scorecard	Glamorgan; 189/6 (20 overs)	v	Essex Eagles (H); 195/6 (19.4 overs)	County Ground, Chelmsford

23 May	Hampshire; 177/5 (20 overs)	v	Sussex Sharks (H); 159/5 (20 overs)	Hampshire won by 18 runs
Scorecard	Hampshire; 177/5 (20 overs)	v	Sussex Sharks (H); 159/5 (20 overs)	County Ground, Hove

25 May	Hampshire; 198/2 (20 overs)	v	Middlesex Panthers (H); 151/9 (20 overs)	Hampshire won by 47 runs
Scorecard	Hampshire; 198/2 (20 overs)	v	Middlesex Panthers (H); 151/9 (20 overs)	Merchant Taylors' School Ground, Northwood

30 May	Sussex Sharks; 178/7 (20 overs)	v	Glamorgan (H); 179/5 (20 overs)	Glamorgan won by 5 wickets
Scorecard	Sussex Sharks; 178/7 (20 overs)	v	Glamorgan (H); 179/5 (20 overs)	Sophia Gardens, Cardiff

30 May	Essex Eagles; 145/5 (20 overs)	v	Hampshire (H); 146/2 (17.2 overs)	Hampshire won by 8 wickets
Scorecard	Essex Eagles; 145/5 (20 overs)	v	Hampshire (H); 146/2 (17.2 overs)	The Rose Bowl, Southampton

30 May	Middlesex Panthers; 117/7 (20 overs)	v	Surrey (H); 121/4 (18.4 overs)	Surrey won by 6 wickets
Scorecard	Middlesex Panthers; 117/7 (20 overs)	v	Surrey (H); 121/4 (18.4 overs)	Kennington Oval, London
Shown live on Sky Sports				Kennington Oval, London

30 May	Kent Spitfires (H); 136/7 (20 overs)	v	Gloucestershire Gladiators; 115/9 (20 overs)	Kent Spitfires won by 21 runs
Scorecard	Kent Spitfires (H); 136/7 (20 overs)	v	Gloucestershire Gladiators; 115/9 (20 overs)	St Lawrence Ground, Canterbury

==== June ====
5 June	Hampshire (H); 171/7 (20 overs)	v	Kent Spitfires; 149/4 (20 overs)	Hampshire won by 22 runs
Scorecard	Hampshire (H); 171/7 (20 overs)	v	Kent Spitfires; 149/4 (20 overs)	The Rose Bowl, Southampton
Shown live on Sky Sports				The Rose Bowl, Southampton

6 June	Glamorgan; 176/3 (20 overs)	v	Somerset (H); 169/4 (20 overs)	Glamorgan won by 7 runs
Scorecard	Glamorgan; 176/3 (20 overs)	v	Somerset (H); 169/4 (20 overs)	County Ground, Taunton

6 June	Surrey (H); 151/6 (20 overs)	v	Essex Eagles; 155/5 (18.5 overs)	Essex Eagles won by 5 wickets
Scorecard	Surrey (H); 151/6 (20 overs)	v	Essex Eagles; 155/5 (18.5 overs)	Kennington Oval, London

6 June	Kent Spitfires (H); 208/4 (20 overs)	v	Middlesex Panthers; 192 (19.4 overs)	Kent Spitfires won by 16 runs
Scorecard	Kent Spitfires (H); 208/4 (20 overs)	v	Middlesex Panthers; 192 (19.4 overs)	St Lawrence Ground, Canterbury

6 June	Gloucestershire Gladiators; 189/6 (20 overs)	v	Sussex Sharks (H); 185 (20 overs)	Gloucestershire won by 4 runs
Scorecard	Gloucestershire Gladiators; 189/6 (20 overs)	v	Sussex Sharks (H); 185 (20 overs)	County Ground, Hove

8 June	Gloucestershire Gladiators (H); 207/3 (20 overs)	v	Glamorgan	No result
Scorecard	Gloucestershire Gladiators (H); 207/3 (20 overs)	v	Glamorgan	County Ground, Bristol
Shown live on Sky Sports				County Ground, Bristol

11 June	Kent Spitfires (H); 189/5 (20 overs)	v	Essex Eagles; 193/4 (19 overs)	Essex Eagles won by 6 wickets
Scorecard	Kent Spitfires (H); 189/5 (20 overs)	v	Essex Eagles; 193/4 (19 overs)	St Lawrence Ground, Canterbury
Shown live on Sky Sports				St Lawrence Ground, Canterbury

13 June	Somerset (H); 176/4 (20 overs)	v	Hampshire; 175/7 (20 overs)	Somerset won by 1 run
Scorecard	Somerset (H); 176/4 (20 overs)	v	Hampshire; 175/7 (20 overs)	County Ground, Taunton

13 June	Glamorgan (H); 177/7 (20 overs)	v	Kent Spitfires; 177/9 (20 overs)	Match tied
Scorecard	Glamorgan (H); 177/7 (20 overs)	v	Kent Spitfires; 177/9 (20 overs)	Sophia Gardens, Cardiff

13 June	Sussex Sharks; 148/5 (20 overs)	v	Surrey (H); 149/0 (15.3 overs)	Surrey won by 10 wickets
Scorecard	Sussex Sharks; 148/5 (20 overs)	v	Surrey (H); 149/0 (15.3 overs)	Kennington Oval, London

13 June	Gloucestershire Gladiators; 162/6 (20 overs)	v	Essex Eagles (H); 163/2 (18.3 overs)	Essex Eagles won by 8 wickets
Scorecard	Gloucestershire Gladiators; 162/6 (20 overs)	v	Essex Eagles (H); 163/2 (18.3 overs)	County Ground, Chelmsford

15 June	Somerset; 163/4 (20 overs)	v	Sussex Sharks (H); 129 (18.5 overs)	Somerset won by 34 runs
Scorecard	Somerset; 163/4 (20 overs)	v	Sussex Sharks (H); 129 (18.5 overs)	Arundel Castle Cricket Club Ground

18 June	Somerset; 152/4 (20 overs)	v	Middlesex Panthers (H); 155/2 (17.1 overs)	Middlesex Panthers won by 8 wickets
Scorecard	Somerset; 152/4 (20 overs)	v	Middlesex Panthers (H); 155/2 (17.1 overs)	Kennington Oval, London

20 June	Surrey; 165/5 (20 overs)	v	Glamorgan (H); 148/8 (20 overs)	Surrey won by 17 runs
Scorecard	Surrey; 165/5 (20 overs)	v	Glamorgan (H); 148/8 (20 overs)	Sophia Gardens, Cardiff

20 June	Middlesex Panthers; 153/5 (20 overs)	v	Essex Eagles (H); 157/8 (19.4 overs)	Essex Eagles won by 2 wickets
Scorecard	Middlesex Panthers; 153/5 (20 overs)	v	Essex Eagles (H); 157/8 (19.4 overs)	County Ground, Chelmsford
Shown live on Sky Sports				County Ground, Chelmsford

20 June	Hampshire (H); 180/6 (20 overs)	v	Gloucestershire Gladiators; 178/8 (20 overs)	Hampshire won by 2 runs
Scorecard	Hampshire (H); 180/6 (20 overs)	v	Gloucestershire Gladiators; 178/8 (20 overs)	The Rose Bowl, Southampton

20 June	Sussex Sharks; 149/8 (20 overs)	v	Kent Spitfires (H); 114 (18.4 overs)	Sussex Sharks won by 35 runs
Scorecard	Sussex Sharks; 149/8 (20 overs)	v	Kent Spitfires (H); 114 (18.4 overs)	St Lawrence Ground, Canterbury

25 June	Hampshire; 170/6 (20 overs)	v	Glamorgan (H); 164/6 (20 overs)	Hampshire won by 6 runs
Scorecard	Hampshire; 170/6 (20 overs)	v	Glamorgan (H); 164/6 (20 overs)	Sophia Gardens, Cardiff
Shown live on Sky Sports				Sophia Gardens, Cardiff

26 June	Gloucestershire Gladiators; 105/6 (20 overs)	v	Middlesex Panthers (H)	No result
Scorecard	Gloucestershire Gladiators; 105/6 (20 overs)	v	Middlesex Panthers (H)	Lord's, London
Shown live on Sky Sports				Lord's, London

27 June	Kent Spitfires; 150/6 (20 overs)	v	Gloucestershire Gladiators (H); 154/7 (20 overs)	Gloucestershire Gladiators won by 3 wickets
Scorecard	Kent Spitfires; 150/6 (20 overs)	v	Gloucestershire Gladiators (H); 154/7 (20 overs)	County Ground, Bristol

27 June	Somerset (H); 150/7 (20 overs)	v	Essex Eagles; 125/2 (16 overs)	Essex Eagles won by 8 wickets (D/L method)
Scorecard	Somerset (H); 150/7 (20 overs)	v	Essex Eagles; 125/2 (16 overs)	County Ground, Taunton

27 June	Hampshire; 131/9 (20 overs)	v	Surrey (H); 137/2 (14 overs)	Surrey won by 8 wickets
Scorecard	Hampshire; 131/9 (20 overs)	v	Surrey (H); 137/2 (14 overs)	Kennington Oval, London

27 June	Middlesex Panthers; 107 (19.5 overs)	v	Sussex Sharks (H); 110/4 (16.1 overs)	Sussex Sharks won by 6 wickets
Scorecard	Middlesex Panthers; 107 (19.5 overs)	v	Sussex Sharks (H); 110/4 (16.1 overs)	County Ground, Hove

==== July ====
2 July	Kent Spitfires; 155/4 (20 overs)	v	Surrey (H); 156/2 (17.5 overs)	Surrey won by 8 wickets
Scorecard	Kent Spitfires; 155/4 (20 overs)	v	Surrey (H); 156/2 (17.5 overs)	Kennington Oval, London
Shown live on Sky Sports				Kennington Oval, London

3 July	Middlesex Panthers (H); 184/3 (20 overs)	v	Glamorgan; 187/4 (19.3 overs)	Glamorgan won by 6 wickets
Scorecard	Middlesex Panthers (H); 184/3 (20 overs)	v	Glamorgan; 187/4 (19.3 overs)	Old Deer Park, Richmond

4 July	Gloucestershire Gladiators (H); 138/7 (15 overs)	v	Sussex Sharks; 125 (14.4 overs)	Gloucestershire Gladiators won by 13 runs
Scorecard	Gloucestershire Gladiators (H); 138/7 (15 overs)	v	Sussex Sharks; 125 (14.4 overs)	County Ground, Bristol
Shown live on Sky Sports				County Ground, Bristol

4 July	Glamorgan (H)	v	Somerset	No result
Scorecard	Glamorgan (H)	v	Somerset	Sophia Gardens, Cardiff

4 July	Surrey; 165/4 (20 overs)	v	Essex Eagles (H); 166/5 (18.3 overs)	Essex Eagles won by 5 wickets
Scorecard	Surrey; 165/4 (20 overs)	v	Essex Eagles (H); 166/5 (18.3 overs)	County Ground, Chelmsford

4 July	Hampshire; 173/9 (20 overs)	v	Kent Spitfires (H); 126 (18.4 overs)	Hampshire won by 47 runs
Scorecard	Hampshire; 173/9 (20 overs)	v	Kent Spitfires (H); 126 (18.4 overs)	St Lawrence Ground, Canterbury

6 July	Somerset; 155/4 (20 overs)	v	Hampshire (H); 116 (16.5 overs)	Somerset won by 39 runs
Scorecard	Somerset; 155/4 (20 overs)	v	Hampshire (H); 116 (16.5 overs)	The Rose Bowl, Southampton
Shown live on Sky Sports				The Rose Bowl, Southampton

11 July	Somerset (H); 175/8 (20 overs)	v	Gloucestershire Gladiators; 168/6 (20 overs)	Somerset won by 7 runs
Scorecard	Somerset (H); 175/8 (20 overs)	v	Gloucestershire Gladiators; 168/6 (20 overs)	County Ground, Taunton

11 July	Glamorgan; 192/4 (20 overs)	v	Surrey (H); 188/4 (20 overs)	Glamorgan won by 4 runs
Scorecard	Glamorgan; 192/4 (20 overs)	v	Surrey (H); 188/4 (20 overs)	Kennington Oval, London

11 July	Middlesex Panthers; 173/6 (20 overs)	v	Hampshire (H); 123 (16.4 overs)	Middlesex Panthers won by 50 runs
Scorecard	Middlesex Panthers; 173/6 (20 overs)	v	Hampshire (H); 123 (16.4 overs)	The Rose Bowl, Southampton

11 July	Kent Spitfires; 149/9 (20 overs)	v	Sussex Sharks (H); 146/9 (20 overs)	Kent Spitfires won by 3 runs
Scorecard	Kent Spitfires; 149/9 (20 overs)	v	Sussex Sharks (H); 146/9 (20 overs)	County Ground, Hove
Shown live on Sky Sports				County Ground, Hove

12 July	Essex Eagles (H); 209/5 (20 overs)	v	Kent Spitfires; 146 (15.5 overs)	Essex Eagles won by 63 runs
Scorecard	Essex Eagles (H); 209/5 (20 overs)	v	Kent Spitfires; 146 (15.5 overs)	Castle Park Cricket Ground, Colchester

15 July	Glamorgan; 151/8 (20 overs)	v	Sussex Sharks (H); 153/5 (18.3 overs)	Sussex Sharks won by 5 wickets
Scorecard	Glamorgan; 151/8 (20 overs)	v	Sussex Sharks (H); 153/5 (18.3 overs)	County Ground, Hove
Shown live on Sky Sports				County Ground, Hove

16 July	Somerset; 136/9 (20 overs)	v	Surrey (H); 137/7 (19.1 overs)	Surrey won by 3 wickets
Scorecard	Somerset; 136/9 (20 overs)	v	Surrey (H); 137/7 (19.1 overs)	Kennington Oval, London
Shown live on Sky Sports				Kennington Oval, London

18 July	Surrey; 157/8 (20 overs)	v	Gloucestershire Gladiators (H); 152/7 (20 overs)	Surrey won by 5 runs
Scorecard	Surrey; 157/8 (20 overs)	v	Gloucestershire Gladiators (H); 152/7 (20 overs)	College Ground, Cheltenham

18 July	Glamorgan (H); 157/2 (20 overs)	v	Essex Eagles; 159/3 (18 overs)	Essex Eagles won by 7 wickets
Scorecard	Glamorgan (H); 157/2 (20 overs)	v	Essex Eagles; 159/3 (18 overs)	Sophia Gardens, Cardiff

18 July	Hampshire (H); 177/3 (20 overs)	v	Sussex Sharks; 171/8 (20 overs)	Hampshire won by 6 runs
Scorecard	Hampshire (H); 177/3 (20 overs)	v	Sussex Sharks; 171/8 (20 overs)	The Rose Bowl, Southampton

18 July	Kent Spitfires (H); 195/7 (20 overs)	v	Somerset; 59/5 (7.3 overs)	Kent Spitfires won by 40 runs (D/L method)
Scorecard	Kent Spitfires (H); 195/7 (20 overs)	v	Somerset; 59/5 (7.3 overs)	St Lawrence Ground, Canterbury
Shown live on Sky Sports				St Lawrence Ground, Canterbury

20 July	Essex Eagles; 183/7 (20 overs)	v	Gloucestershire Gladiators (H); 186/4 (19.4 overs)	Gloucestershire Gladiators won by 6 wickets
Scorecard	Essex Eagles; 183/7 (20 overs)	v	Gloucestershire Gladiators (H); 186/4 (19.4 overs)	College Ground, Cheltenham

22 July	Essex Eagles (H); 167/9 (20 overs)	v	Hampshire; 168/5 (17.3 overs)	Hampshire won by 5 wickets
Scorecard	Essex Eagles (H); 167/9 (20 overs)	v	Hampshire; 168/5 (17.3 overs)	County Ground, Chelmsford
Shown live on Sky Sports				County Ground, Chelmsford

24 July	Middlesex Panthers (H); 137/8 (20 overs)	v	Surrey; 138/8 (20 overs)	Surrey won by 2 wickets
Scorecard	Middlesex Panthers (H); 137/8 (20 overs)	v	Surrey; 138/8 (20 overs)	Lord's, London

25 July	Essex Eagles (H); 225/3 (20 overs)	v	Sussex Sharks; 226/3 (18.3 overs)	Sussex Sharks won by 7 wickets
Scorecard	Essex Eagles (H); 225/3 (20 overs)	v	Sussex Sharks; 226/3 (18.3 overs)	County Ground, Chelmsford

25 July	Gloucestershire Gladiators; 108/9 (20 overs)	v	Glamorgan (H); 110/2 (12 overs)	Glamorgan won by 8 wickets
Scorecard	Gloucestershire Gladiators; 108/9 (20 overs)	v	Glamorgan (H); 110/2 (12 overs)	Sophia Gardens, Cardiff

25 July	Kent Spitfires (H); 175/7 (20 overs)	v	Surrey; 154/7 (20 overs)	Kent Spitfires won by 21 runs
Scorecard	Kent Spitfires (H); 175/7 (20 overs)	v	Surrey; 154/7 (20 overs)	St Lawrence Ground, Canterbury

25 July	Somerset (H); 183/3 (20 overs)	v	Middlesex Panthers; 161/7 (20 overs)	Somerset won by 22 runs
Scorecard	Somerset (H); 183/3 (20 overs)	v	Middlesex Panthers; 161/7 (20 overs)	County Ground, Taunton

== Knockout stage ==
Quarter-finals
Lancashire Lightning (H)	137/8
Glamorgan	136/7
Worcestershire Rapids	141/9
Surrey (H)	144/7
Birmingham Bears	197/2
Essex Eagles (H)	178/5
Nottinghamshire Outlaws (H)	197/2
Hampshire	198/5

Semifinals
Birmingham Bears	194/4
Surrey	178/7
Lancashire Lightning	160/5
Hampshire	101

Final
Birmingham Bears	181/5
Lancashire Lightning	177/8

=== Quarter-finals ===
1 August	Lancashire Lightning (H); 137/8 (20 overs)	v	Glamorgan; 136/7 (20 overs)	Lancashire Lightning won by 1 run
18:30; Scorecard	Lancashire Lightning (H); 137/8 (20 overs)	v	Glamorgan; 136/7 (20 overs)	Old Trafford, Manchester; Umpires: Jeff Evans (Eng) & Peter Hartley (Eng)
18:30; Scorecard	Usman Khawaja 67 (54); Graham Wagg 3/28 (4 overs)		Jacques Rudolph 67* (49); Jordan Clark 4/22 (4 overs)	Old Trafford, Manchester; Umpires: Jeff Evans (Eng) & Peter Hartley (Eng)
Glamorgan won the toss and elected to field; Match postponed due to rain until 2 August (at 14:00)				Old Trafford, Manchester; Umpires: Jeff Evans (Eng) & Peter Hartley (Eng)

2 August	Worcestershire Rapids; 141/9 (20 overs)	v	Surrey (H); 144/7 (16.3 overs)	Surrey won by 3 wickets
14:30; Scorecard	Worcestershire Rapids; 141/9 (20 overs)	v	Surrey (H); 144/7 (16.3 overs)	Kennington Oval, London; Umpires: Rob Bailey (Eng) & Nick Cook (Eng); Player of the match: Jason Roy
14:30; Scorecard	Richard Oliver 34 (36); Robin Peterson 2/12 (2 overs)		Jason Roy 52 (23); Joe Leach 2/22 (4 overs)	Kennington Oval, London; Umpires: Rob Bailey (Eng) & Nick Cook (Eng); Player of the match: Jason Roy
Surrey won the toss and elected to field				Kennington Oval, London; Umpires: Rob Bailey (Eng) & Nick Cook (Eng); Player of the match: Jason Roy

2 August	Birmingham Bears; 197/2 (20 overs)	v	Essex Eagles (H); 178/5 (20 overs)	Birmingham Bears won by 19 runs
18:00; Scorecard	Birmingham Bears; 197/2 (20 overs)	v	Essex Eagles (H); 178/5 (20 overs)	County Ground, Chelmsford; Umpires: David Millns (Eng) & Tim Robinson (Eng); Player of the match: Rikki Clarke
18:00; Scorecard	Varun Chopra 86* (54); Ravi Bopara 2/42 (4 overs)		Ryan ten Doeschate 61* (37); Boyd Rankin 3/34 (4 overs)	County Ground, Chelmsford; Umpires: David Millns (Eng) & Tim Robinson (Eng); Player of the match: Rikki Clarke
Essex Eagles won the toss and elected to field				County Ground, Chelmsford; Umpires: David Millns (Eng) & Tim Robinson (Eng); Player of the match: Rikki Clarke

3 August	Nottinghamshire Outlaws (H); 197/2 (20 overs)	v	Hampshire; 198/5 (19 overs)	Hampshire won by 5 wickets
14:30; Scorecard	Nottinghamshire Outlaws (H); 197/2 (20 overs)	v	Hampshire; 198/5 (19 overs)	Trent Bridge, Nottingham; Umpires: Michael Gough (Eng) & Neil Mallender (Eng); Player of the match: James Vince
14:30; Scorecard	Rikki Wessels 62* (41); Matt Coles 2/36 (4 overs)		James Vince 93* (51); Luke Fletcher 2/26 (4 overs)	Trent Bridge, Nottingham; Umpires: Michael Gough (Eng) & Neil Mallender (Eng); Player of the match: James Vince
Nottinghamshire Outlaws won the toss and elected to bat				Trent Bridge, Nottingham; Umpires: Michael Gough (Eng) & Neil Mallender (Eng); Player of the match: James Vince

=== Semifinals ===
23 August	Birmingham Bears; 194/4 (20 overs)	v	Surrey; 178/7 (20 overs)	Birmingham Bears won by 16 runs
11:00; Scorecard	Birmingham Bears; 194/4 (20 overs)	v	Surrey; 178/7 (20 overs)	Edgbaston, Birmingham; Attendance: 23,000; Umpires: Michael Gough and Tim Robinson; Player of the match: William Porterfield
11:00; Scorecard	William Porterfield 81* (47); Gareth Batty 1/24 (4 overs)		Jason Roy 58 (25); Ateeq Javid 2/13 (3 overs)	Edgbaston, Birmingham; Attendance: 23,000; Umpires: Michael Gough and Tim Robinson; Player of the match: William Porterfield
Surrey won the toss and elected to field				Edgbaston, Birmingham; Attendance: 23,000; Umpires: Michael Gough and Tim Robinson; Player of the match: William Porterfield

23 August	Lancashire Lightning; 160/5 (19 overs)	v	Hampshire; 101 (14.1 overs)	Lancashire Lightning won by 41 runs (D/L method)
14:30; Scorecard	Lancashire Lightning; 160/5 (19 overs)	v	Hampshire; 101 (14.1 overs)	Edgbaston, Birmingham; Attendance: 23,000; Umpires: Neil Mallender and Tim Robinson
14:30; Scorecard	Ashwell Prince 72* (53); Will Smith 3/15 (4 overs)		Jimmy Adams 53 (39); Steven Croft 2/11 (3 overs)	Edgbaston, Birmingham; Attendance: 23,000; Umpires: Neil Mallender and Tim Robinson
Hampshire won the toss and elected to field; Lancashire innings reduced to 19 overs due to rain; Hampshire innings reduced to 16 overs due to rain				Edgbaston, Birmingham; Attendance: 23,000; Umpires: Neil Mallender and Tim Robinson

=== Final ===
23 August	Birmingham Bears; 181/5 (20 overs)	v	Lancashire Lightning; 177/8 (20 overs)	Birmingham Bears won by 4 runs
18:45; Scorecard	Birmingham Bears; 181/5 (20 overs)	v	Lancashire Lightning; 177/8 (20 overs)	Edgbaston, Birmingham; Attendance: 23,000; Umpires: Rob Bailey and Michael Gough; Player of the match: Laurie Evans
18:45; Scorecard	Laurie Evans 53 (30); Tom Smith 2/30 (3 overs)		Karl Brown 55 (28); Oliver Hannon-Dalby 3/31 (4 overs)	Edgbaston, Birmingham; Attendance: 23,000; Umpires: Rob Bailey and Michael Gough; Player of the match: Laurie Evans
Birmingham Bears won the toss and elected to bat				Edgbaston, Birmingham; Attendance: 23,000; Umpires: Rob Bailey and Michael Gough; Player of the match: Laurie Evans

== Personnel ==
Team	Coach	Captain	Overseas player(s)
Birmingham Bears	(Scotland) Dougie Brown	(England) Jim Troughton	(Pakistan) Shoaib Malik (New Zealand) Jeetan Patel
Derbyshire Falcons	(England) Graeme Welch	(South Africa) Wayne Madsen	(Cricket West Indies) Shivnarine Chanderpaul (Australia) Marcus North
Durham Jets	(England) Jon Lewis	(England) Mark Stoneman	(Australia) John Hastings
Essex Eagles	(England) Paul Grayson	(Netherlands) Ryan ten Doeschate	(New Zealand) Jesse Ryder
Glamorgan	(Wales) Toby Radford	(Australia) Jim Allenby	(South Africa) Jacques Rudolph (Cricket West Indies) Darren Sammy
Gloucestershire Gladiators	(New Zealand) John Bracewell	(Australia) Michael Klinger	(Australia) Michael Klinger
Hampshire	(England) Giles White	(England) James Vince	(South Africa) Kyle Abbott (Australia) Glenn Maxwell
Kent Spitfires	(Cricket West Indies) Jimmy Adams	(England) Rob Key	(Australia) Doug Bollinger
Lancashire Lightning	(England) Peter Moores	(England) Glen Chapple	(Pakistan) Junaid Khan (Australia) Usman Khawaja
Leicestershire Foxes	(England) Phil Whitticase	(England) Josh Cobb	(Cricket West Indies) Ramnaresh Sarwan (New Zealand) Scott Styris
Middlesex Panthers	(England) Richard Scott	(England) Eoin Morgan	(Australia) Daniel Christian (Australia) Chris Rogers
Northamptonshire Steelbacks	(England) David Ripley	(England) Alex Wakely	(South Africa) Richard Levi (Pakistan) Sohail Tanvir
Nottinghamshire Outlaws	(England) Mick Newell	(England) James Taylor	(Australia) Peter Siddle
Somerset	(South Africa) David Nosworthy	(England) Marcus Trescothick	(South Africa) Alviro Petersen (Australia) Dirk Nannes
Surrey	(South Africa) Graham Ford	(South Africa) Graeme Smith	(South Africa) Graeme Smith (South Africa) Hashim Amla
Sussex Sharks	(England) Mark Robinson	(Ireland) Ed Joyce	(Pakistan) Yasir Arafat
Worcestershire Rapids	(England) Steve Rhodes	(England) Daryl Mitchell	(New Zealand) Colin Munro (New Zealand) Mitchell McClenaghan (Pakistan) Saeed Ajmal (Sri Lanka) Sachithra Senanayake
Yorkshire Vikings	(Australia) Jason Gillespie	(England) Andrew Gale	(Australia) Aaron Finch (New Zealand) Kane Williamson

== Statistics ==
=== Highest team totals ===
The following table lists the five highest team scores in the season.

Team	Total	Opponent	Ground
Lancashire Lightning	229/4	Worcestershire Rapids	New Road, Worcester
Sussex Sharks	226/3	Essex Eagles	County Ground
Lancashire Lightning	225/7	Derbyshire Falcons	Old Trafford, Manchester
Essex Eagles	225/3	Sussex Sharks	County Ground
Nottinghamshire Outlaws	220/4	Leicestershire Foxes	Grace Road, Leicester

=== Most runs ===
The top five highest run scorers (total runs) in the season are included in this table.

Player	Team	Runs	Inns	Avg	S/R	HS	100s	50s	4s	6s
Jason Roy	Surrey	677	15	48.35	157.07	81*	0	9	77	27
Luke Wright	Sussex Sharks	601	14	50.08	162.43	153*	2	3	56	28
Jim Allenby	Glamorgan	548	13	45.66	137.68	105	1	4	63	14
Jacques Rudolph	Glamorgan	543	13	60.33	123.40	75*	0	6	61	2
Tom Westley	Essex Eagles	538	14	44.83	149.86	109*	2	1	59	16

=== Highest scores ===
This table contains the top five highest scores of the season made by a batsman in a single innings.

Player	Team	Score	Balls	4s	6s	Opponent	Ground
Luke Wright	Sussex Sharks	153*	66	12	11	Essex Eagles	County Ground
Daniel Christian	Middlesex Panthers	129	57	12	10	Kent Spitfires	St Lawrence Ground, Canterbury
Luke Wright	Sussex Sharks	116*	66	13	4	Hampshire	The Rose Bowl, Southampton
Tom Westley	Essex Eagles	109*	58	12	5	Sussex Sharks	County Ground
Jim Allenby	Glamorgan	105	63	14	3	Middlesex Panthers	Old Deer Park, Richmond

=== Most wickets ===
The following table contains the five leading wicket-takers of the season.

Player	Team	Wkts	Inns	Ave	S/R	Econ	BBI
Jeetan Patel	Birmingham Bears	25	15	12.96	12.7	6.11	4/19
Dirk Nannes	Somerset	24	13	15.54	11.6	8.02	5/31
Michael Hogan	Glamorgan	21	13	19.52	14.5	8.03	3/30
Danny Briggs	Hampshire	21	15	20.71	16.8	7.37	4/28
Kabir Ali	Lancashire Lightning	20	11	14.95	11.7	7.66	3/19

=== Best bowling figures ===
This table lists the top five players with the best bowling figures in the season.

Player	Team	Overs	Figures	Opponent	Ground
Anthony Ireland	Leicestershire Foxes	3.5	5/22	Derbyshire Falcons	Queen's Park, Chesterfield
Jesse Ryder	Essex Eagles	3.5	5/27	Kent Spitfires	Castle Park Cricket Ground, Colchester
Daryl Mitchell	Worcestershire Rapids	4.0	5/28	Northamptonshire Steelbacks	County Ground, Northampton
Dirk Nannes	Somerset	3.5	5/31	Sussex Sharks	Arundel Castle, Arundel
Richard Jones	Leicestershire Foxes	4.0	5/34	Lancashire Lightning	Old Trafford, Manchester

== See also ==
- 2014 Royal London One-Day Cup
- 2014 County Championship
