= 2006 Twenty20 Cup =

- Dates: 27 June 2006 – 12 August 2006
- Administrator: England and Wales Cricket Board
- Cricket format: Twenty20
- Tournament format(s): Group stage and knockout
- Champions: Leicestershire Foxes (2nd title)
- Participants: 18
- Matches: 79
- Most runs: Justin Langer (464 for Somerset)
- Most wickets: Nayan Doshi (21 for Surrey)

The 2006 Twenty20 Cup was the fourth edition of what would later become the T20 Blast, England's premier domestic Twenty20 competition. The finals day took place on 12 August at Trent Bridge, Nottingham, and was won by the Leicestershire Foxes.

== Fixtures and results ==
=== Group stage ===
==== Midlands/Wales/West Division ====
Team	Pld	W	L	T	N/R	Pts	Net R/R
Gloucestershire Gladiators	8	6	2	0	0	12	–0.394
Northamptonshire Steelbacks	8	5	2	1	0	11	+0.241
Warwickshire Bears	8	4	3	0	1	9	+0.468
Glamorgan Dragons	8	3	4	0	1	7	–0.163
Somerset Sabres	8	2	5	1	0	5	+0.289
Worcestershire Royals	8	2	6	0	0	4	–0.463

==== North Division ====
Team	Pld	W	L	T	N/R	Pts	Net R/R
Leicestershire Foxes	8	6	2	0	0	12	+1.456
Nottinghamshire Outlaws	8	6	2	0	0	12	+0.550
Yorkshire Phoenix	8	4	3	0	1	9	+0.746
Lancashire Lightning	8	3	5	0	0	6	+0.030
Derbyshire Phantoms	8	2	5	0	1	5	–1.334
Durham Dynamos	8	2	6	0	0	4	–1.481

==== South Division ====
Team	Pld	W	L	T	N/R	Pts	Net R/R
Essex Eagles	8	6	2	0	0	12	+0.535
Surrey Lions	8	5	3	0	0	10	1.450
Kent Spitfires	8	5	3	0	0	10	–0.298
Sussex Sharks	8	4	4	0	0	8	–0.141
Hampshire Hawks	8	3	5	0	0	6	+0.009
Middlesex Crusaders	8	1	7	0	0	2	–1.612

== Knockout stage ==
Quarter-finals
24 July - County Ground, Chelmsford
Essex (H)	143/7
Yorkshire	142/5
24 July - County Ground, Leicester
Leicestershire (H)	156/1
Kent	153/5
24 July - Trent Bridge, Nottingham
Nottinghamshire (H)	213/6
Northamptonshire	150/6
24 July - County Ground, Bristol
Gloucestershire (H)	144
Surrey	224/5

Semi-finals
12 August - Trent Bridge, Nottingham
Essex	150/9
Leicestershire	173/4
12 August - Trent Bridge, Nottingham
Nottinghamshire (H)	176/6
Surrey	139

Final
12 August - Trent Bridge, Nottingham
Nottinghamshire (H)	173/8
Leicestershire	177/2

== See also ==
- Twenty20 Cup
