= Gerrit Rudolph (cricketer) =

South African-born Namibian cricketer (born 1988)

Personal information
- Full name: Gerhardus Johannes Rudolph
- Born: 22 March 1988 (age 38); Pretoria, South Africa
- Batting: Right-handed
- Bowling: Leg break
- Relatives: Jacques Rudolph (brother)

International information
- National side: Namibia

Domestic team information
- Years: Team
- 2006/07: Limpopo
- 2007/08–2012/13: Namibia

Career statistics
Competition	FC	LA	T20
Matches	52	43	12
Runs scored	2,170	912	135
Batting average	22.60	24.64	11.25
100s/50s	1/11	0/8	0/0
Top score	118	87	41
Balls bowled	84	–	–
Wickets	1	–	–
Bowling average	98.00	–	–
5 wickets in innings	0	–	–
10 wickets in match	0	–	–
Best bowling	1/33	–	–
Catches/stumpings	48/–	13/–	2/–
- Source: CricketArchive, 27 January 2025

Gerhardus Johannes Rudolph (born 2 March 1988) is a South African-born former cricketer who played for the Namibia national cricket team. He made his first-class debut for Limpopo during the 2006–07 South African season before moving to play for Namibia the following season.

Rudolph's brother is South African Test cricketer Jacques Rudolph.
