= Richard Oliver (cricketer) =

English cricketer (born 1989)

Personal information
- Full name: Richard Kenneth Oliver
- Born: 14 November 1989 (age 36); Stoke-on-Trent, Staffordshire, England
- Batting: Left-handed
- Bowling: Right-arm medium

Domestic team information
- Years: Team
- 2008–2014, 2016: Shropshire
- 2014–2015: Worcestershire (squad no. 43)
- FC debut: 29 June 2014 Worcestershire v Glamorgan
- LA debut: 27 July 2014 Worcestershire v Essex

Career statistics
Competition	FC	LA	T20
Matches	20	9	23
Runs scored	1,052	66	472
Batting average	29.22	7.33	22.47
100s/50s	2/5	0/0	0/2
Top score	179	14	77
Catches/stumpings	10/–	4/–	6/–
- Source: CricketArchive, 3 April 2016

Richard Kenneth Oliver (born 14 November 1989) is an English cricketer who played for Worcestershire. He is a left-handed batsman who also bowls right-arm medium pace. He made his debut for the county on 16 May 2014 in the 2014 NatWest t20 Blast against Durham.

He declined a new contract with Worcestershire in 2015. After a second spell with minor county Shropshire, he became captain of the Reigate Priory club in Surrey.
