= Jim Allenby =

Australian cricketer

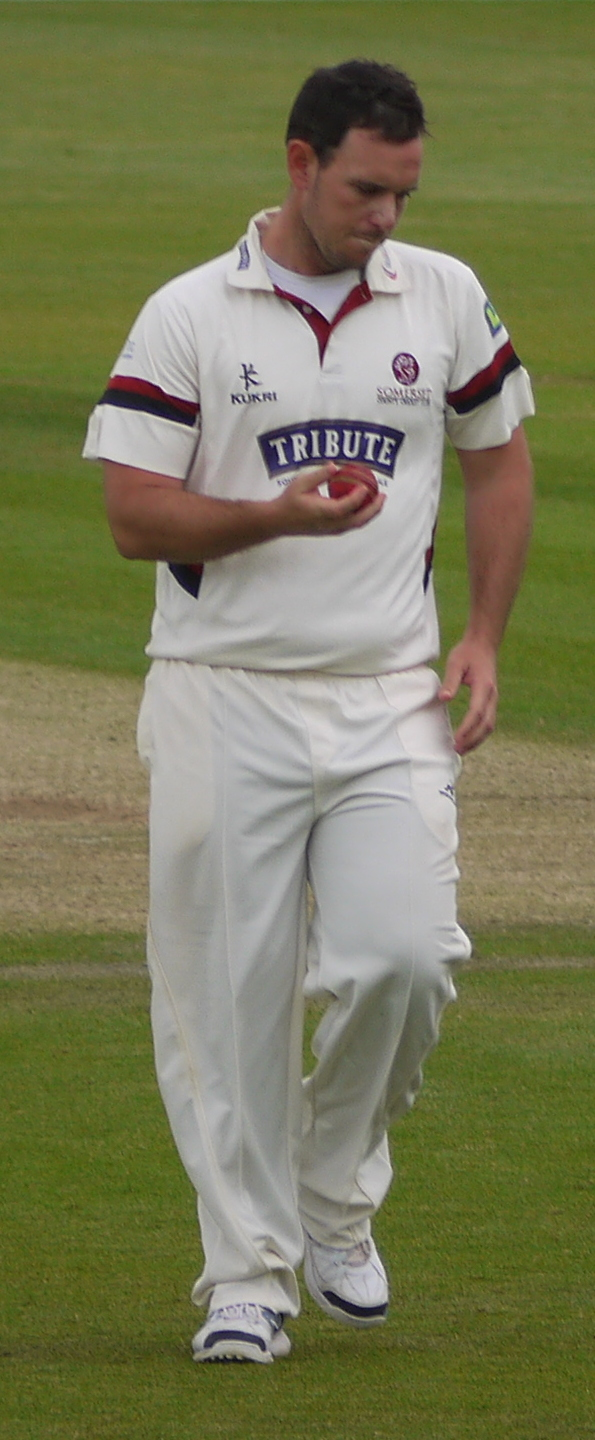

Personal information
- Full name: James Allenby
- Born: 12 September 1982 (age 44); Perth, Western Australia
- Height: 6 ft 0 in (1.83 m)
- Batting: Right-handed
- Bowling: Right-arm medium
- Role: All-rounder

Domestic team information
- Years: Team
- 2002: Durham Cricket Board
- 2005–2009: Leicestershire
- 2009: → Glamorgan (on loan)
- 2006/07: Western Australia
- 2010–2014: Glamorgan
- 2015–2017: Somerset (squad no. 6)
- 2016: Peshawar Zalmi
- FC debut: 26 July 2006 Leicestershire v West Indies A
- LA debut: 12 September 2002 Durham CB v Herefordshire

Career statistics
| Competition | FC | LA | T20 |
|---|---|---|---|
| Matches | 153 | 121 | 137 |
| Runs scored | 7,784 | 3,035 | 3,224 |
| Batting average | 37.06 | 29.75 | 29.30 |
| 100s/50s | 10/56 | 1/18 | 2/20 |
| Top score | 138* | 144* | 110 |
| Balls bowled | 18,057 | 3,648 | 1,564 |
| Wickets | 298 | 84 | 60 |
| Bowling average | 26.51 | 35.84 | 34.50 |
| 5 wickets in innings | 5 | 1 | 2 |
| 10 wickets in match | 1 | 0 | 0 |
| Best bowling | 6/54 | 5/43 | 5/21 |
| Catches/stumpings | 165/– | 47/– | 35/– |
- Source: CricketArchive, 18 August 2017

James Allenby (born 12 September 1982) is an Australian former professional cricketer who most recently played for Somerset. He played as a right-handed batsman and a right-arm medium-pace bowler.

== Career ==
Allenby began playing senior cricket for Durham Cricket Board, though he only played one game for the team and it was a further three years before he made another first-class or List A appearance.

Having played second XI cricket for Leicestershire Allenby broke into the first team in 2005, he made three appearances in the Twenty20 Cup and played one one-day match at the end of the season. During the season he played club cricket for Brandon Cricket Club in the North East and scored a league record 266 in a 45 over match against Langley Park.

In 2006 Allenby was a regular in the Leicestershire side which won the Twenty20 Cup, scoring 64 and taking two wickets in the final against Nottinghamshire. In the same season he made his first-class debut against the touring West Indies A and made his County Championship debut in the final game of the season against Essex. In the latter he scored a maiden first-class century (103) and followed that with 68 not out in the second innings as Leicestershire successfully chased 301.

In the English off-season at the start of calendar year 2007 he played one Twenty20 game for Western Australia, having previously played for their Under-19 team between 2000 and 2002.

On 15 June 2008, Allenby became the first player in Twenty20 Cup history to achieve four wickets with four consecutive balls, when he removed Lancashire Lightning players Kyle Hogg, Steven Croft, Dominic Cork and Sajid Mahmood. Unfortunately for Allenby, he was out for a duck in the Leicestershire innings, as his side lost the match by 37 runs.

It was announced on 10 August 2009 that Allenby would be signing for Glamorgan County Cricket Club for the 2010 season.

On 4 June 2010, Allenby scored 58 runs for the Dragons in their Friends Provident opening match against Gloucestershire.

At the end of the 2012 season which saw him score 733 County Championship runs and take 42 wickets, he was named Glamorgan's player of the year. He described the season as 'disappointing' and felt the county fell 'well short' of the standards required to be a successful county side.

In 2013, he topped Glamorgan's batting averages in both the County Championship and Friends Life t20, with an exceptional average of 60.10 in the longer format. Contributing two centuries and nine 50's. In Twenty20, he scored three 50's, averaging over 50, and with an exceptional strike rate of 134.98. Despite this, he is continually overlooked by England much to his frustration.

On 18 November 2014, Allenby signed for Somerset ahead of the 2015 season. In September 2017, after three seasons with Somerset, it was announced that Allenby was to be released at the end of the season.

== Career best performances ==
Updated 5 September 2017

| | Batting | | | | Bowling (innings) | | | |
| | Score | Fixture | Venue | Season | Figures | Fixture | Venue | Season |
|---|---|---|---|---|---|---|---|---|
| FC | 138* | Leicestershire v Bangladesh A | Leicester | 2008 | 6/54 | Glamorgan v Hampshire | Cardiff | 2014 |
| LA | 144* | Somerset v Glamorgan | Cardiff | 2017 | 5/43 | Leicestershire Foxes v Derbyshire Phantoms | Leicester | 2007 |
| T20 | 110 | Leicestershire Foxes v Nottinghamshire Outlaws | Leicester | 2009 | 5/21 | Leicestershire Foxes v Lancashire Lightning | Manchester | 2008 |
