= Robbie Montgomery (cricketer) =

English cricketer (born 1994)

Personal information
- Full name: Robbie Jay Montgomery
- Born: 22 September 1994 (age 32); Taunton, Somerset, England
- Batting: Right-handed
- Bowling: Right-arm medium

Domestic team information
- Years: Team
- 2014–2015: Gloucestershire (squad no. 20)
- T20 debut: 25 July 2014 Gloucestershire v Glamorgan

Career statistics
Competition	T20
Matches	1
Runs scored	8
Batting average	–
100s/50s	0/0
Top score	8*
Balls bowled	18
Wickets	0
Bowling average	–
5 wickets in innings	–
10 wickets in match	–
Best bowling	–
Catches/stumpings	0/–
- Source: Cricinfo, 5 September 2015

Robbie Jay Montgomery (born 22 September 1994) is an English cricketer who played for Gloucestershire County Cricket Club. Primarily a right arm fast-medium bowler, he also bats right-handed. He was released by Gloucestershire at the end of the 2015 season, without having played any first-class cricket that summer due to ongoing lower back troubles.
