= Jacques Rudolph =

South African cricketer

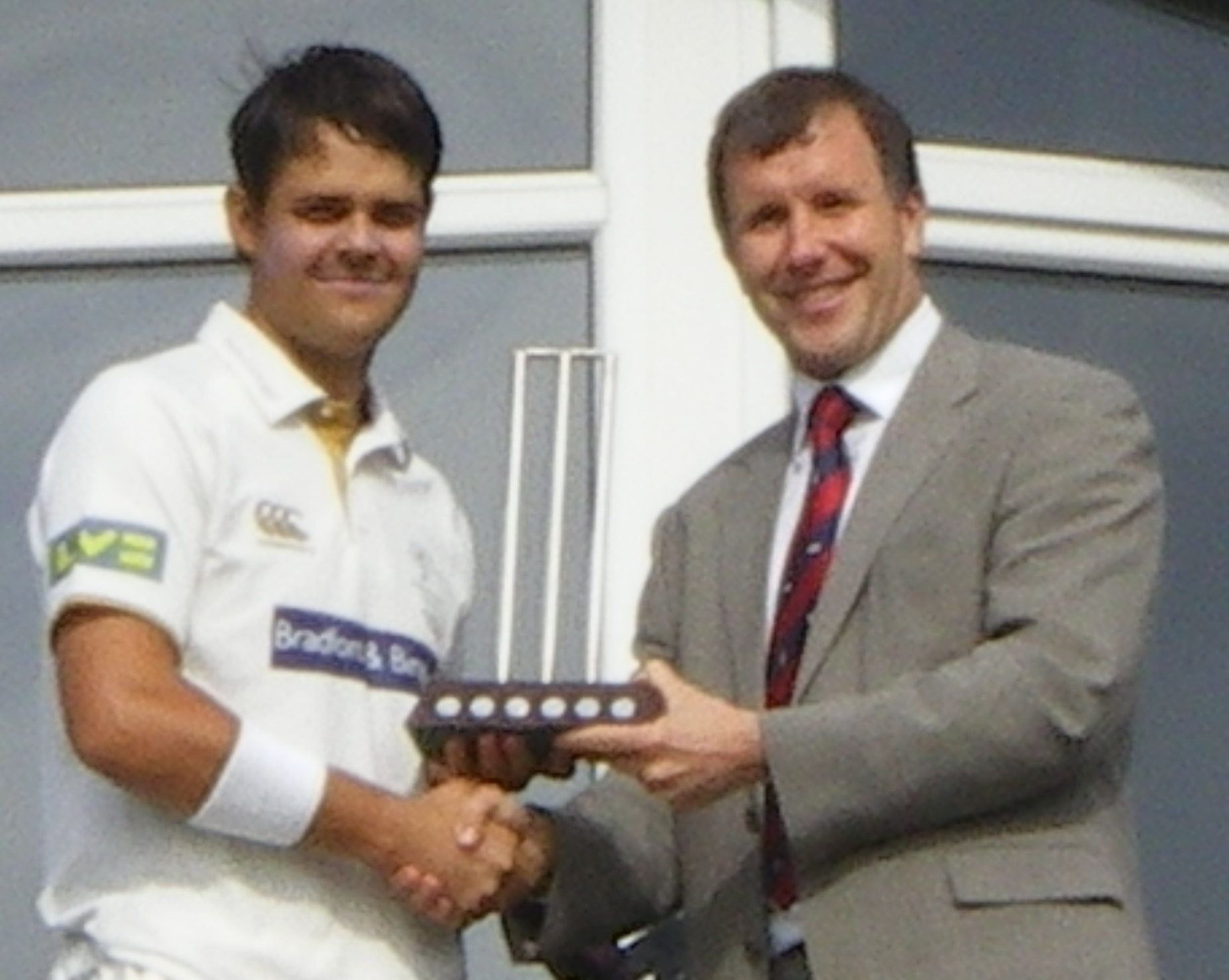
- Rudolph (left) receiving the 2008 Yorkshire Player of the Year award.

Personal information
- Full name: Jacobus Andries Rudolph
- Born: 4 May 1981 (age 45); Springs, Gauteng Province, South Africa
- Nickname: Rudy
- Height: 5 ft 11 in (1.80 m)
- Batting: Left-handed
- Bowling: Right-arm leg break
- Role: Batsman
- Relatives: Gerrit Rudolph (brother)

International information
- National side: South Africa (2003–2012)
- Test debut (cap 289): 24 April 2003 v Bangladesh
- Last Test: 22 November 2012 v Australia
- ODI debut (cap 74): 13 April 2003 v India
- Last ODI: 5 February 2006 v Australia
- ODI shirt no.: 27

Domestic team information
- Years: Team
- 1997/98–2003/04: Northerns
- 2004/05: Titans
- 2005/06–2007/08: Eagles
- 2007–2011: Yorkshire
- 2008/09–2014/15: Titans
- 2012: Surrey
- 2013: Jamaica Tallawahs
- 2014–2017: Glamorgan

Career statistics
Competition	Test	ODI	FC	LA
Matches	48	45	294	262
Runs scored	2,622	1,174	19,825	10,285
Batting average	35.43	35.57	41.56	48.28
100s/50s	6/11	0/7	51/93	18/70
Top score	222*	81	228*	169*
Balls bowled	664	24	4,789	494
Wickets	4	0	61	13
Bowling average	108.00	–	44.19	36.46
5 wickets in innings	0	–	3	0
10 wickets in match	0	–	0	0
Best bowling	1/1	–	5/80	4/41
Catches/stumpings	29/–	11/–	244/–	91/–
- Source: CricketArchive, 28 September 2017

Jacobus Andries "Jacques" Rudolph (born 4 May 1981) is a former South African cricketer who played for Yorkshire, Glamorgan and in South Africa with Titans.

He attended Afrikaanse Hoër Seunskool, a popular and renowned public school located in Pretoria.

== International cricket ==
Rudolph was chosen for South Africa's Test team in 2003 having previously had his selection for the 2002 New Year's Test against Australia in Sydney overruled by cricket administrators due to the South African practice of obeying a 'quota' of non-white players; the board overruled the selectors and installed Justin Ontong in the team. The selectors noticed him during one of his performances in domestic cricket.

Rudolph was named the South African Cricket Annual Cricketer of the Year in 2003.

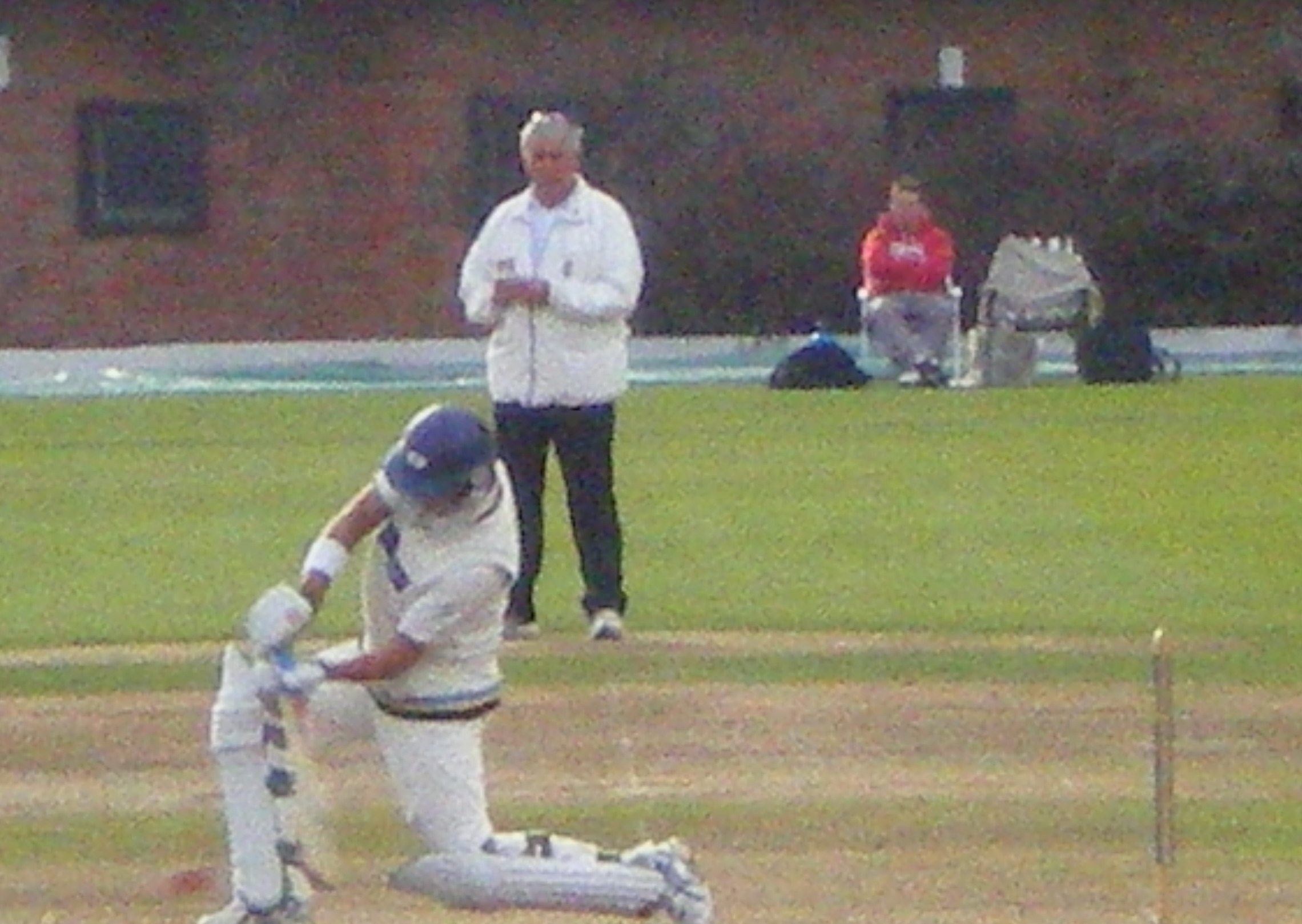
Rudolph cover drive for Yorkshire

In his debut Test match against Bangladesh he scored 222 not out, his best first class score. It is still the highest Test debut score by a left-handed batsman and a Test opener as of 2013, when Hamish Rutherford made 171 for New Zealand against England.

He also broke the South African third-wicket partnership record, alongside Boeta Dippenaar, reaching 429* against Bangladesh at Chittagong. He saved a Test for South Africa in the Perth Test match in December 2005 after defying the Australian bowlers for more than a day to score 102* and ensure a draw. After declaring himself unavailable for selection by South Africa after agreeing to join Yorkshire under the Kolpak ruling he stated he did not want to represent South Africa again and hoped to possibly represent England, qualifying by residency, after deciding to buy a house and live permanently in Yorkshire.

Rudolph was recalled to the South African Test squad in October 2011, for the two-Test home series against Australia.

== Domestic cricket ==
Rudolph played for the Nashua Titans in South Africa. He also represented the Gestetner Diamond Eagles and Northerns.

Although still centrally contracted, Rudolph signed a three-year deal in 2007 to play in England for Yorkshire County Cricket Club under the Kolpak ruling. In doing so he declared himself unavailable for selection for the duration of the contract. Rudolph wore squad number 24 for Yorkshire and in October 2007 further committed himself to the county, signing a 4-year deal which would keep him at the club until 2011.

In 2008, Rudolph was awarded the Players' Player, and fans' Player of the Year awards for Yorkshire. He was also awarded Yorkshire CCC Players' player of the year in 2010. He left Yorkshire at the end of the 2010 season after mutual agreement to terminate his contract a year early. This was so that he and his wife could return to South Africa to be closer to family. In July 2011, following Yorkshire's run of poor form, Rudolph returned to Yorkshire CCC for the last six games of the season. In his first game back against Lancashire he scored 12 and 35 in a loss against Lancashire CCC. In his second county game against Hampshire CCC he scored 99 before being caught off Imran Tahir.

On 27 April 2017, Rudolph completed his 10,000 runs in List-A cricket.

He made a record breaking century debut versus Surrey at The Oval during the County Championship. Yorkshire had made a shaky start, but alongside promising all-rounder Adil Rashid, Rudolph helped make 190 and in the process break a record 6th wicket partnership against Surrey for Yorkshire. The record had stood since George Hirst and Irving Washington posted 134 in 1902. Rudolph's fine innings ended for 122, being caught off the bowling of Steve Magoffin, the innings including 20 fours and 3 sixes. Rudolph went on to hit further consecutive centuries against Worcestershire (129*) and Durham (104*). His finest moment for Yorkshire came at North Marine Road, Scarborough on 23 August where he racked up a double century against Warwickshire and helped put Yorkshire in a commanding position.

Rudolph began the 2007 one-day season opening the batting and took just 3 games to score his maiden one-day century for Yorkshire, hitting exactly 100 off 133 balls against Leicestershire. Despite Rudolph's knock, Yorkshire went on to lose the game by 6 wickets. He kicked off his Pro40 season in style with 127 in a match against Kent at Scarborough in a Yorkshire win and continued his good form in the 8-wicket thrashing of Glamorgan with 49* as they went top of Division 2.

He made his Twenty20 debut for Yorkshire at Grace Road against Leicestershire in a televised game on 22 June 2007 during the Twenty20 Cup. In a rain reduced game (16 overs) he was the 2nd victim of a Jeremy Snape hat-trick having scored 3 from 4 balls. He fared considerably better in the Roses match at Old Trafford, scoring 48* from 38 balls (3 fours, 2 sixes) in a losing total of 113, and remained not out until the final game of the group stages against Derbyshire.

On 18 September 2013, Rudolph signed a two-year contract with Glamorgan subject to approval from the South African Cricket Board. He replaced Australian Marcus North as Glamorgan's overseas player. He stayed with the club for the 2015 season, and has been announced as their continued overseas player for the 2016 season.

== Records ==
- Jacques Rudolph - who scored 222 not out on debut - and Boeta Dippenaar shared an unbroken stand of 429 for South Africa's third wicket against Bangladesh. This is the highest partnership in Test cricket to involve one debutant.
