= Tom Lancefield =

English cricketer

Personal information
- Full name: Thomas John Lancefield
- Born: 8 October 1990 (age 36); Epsom, Surrey, England
- Batting: Left-handed
- Bowling: Left-arm medium
- Role: Batsman

Domestic team information
- Years: Team
- 2009–2012: Surrey
- 2010/11: Tamil Union
- 2013: Unicorns
- 2014: Glamorgan

Career statistics
| Competition | FC | LA | T20 |
|---|---|---|---|
| Matches | 14 | 12 | 5 |
| Runs scored | 488 | 425 | 65 |
| Batting average | 22.18 | 35.41 | 21.66 |
| 100s/50s | 0/2 | 0/3 | 0/0 |
| Top score | 74 | 80 | 27 |
| Balls bowled | 36 | – | – |
| Wickets | 1 | – | – |
| Bowling average | 27.00 | – | – |
| 5 wickets in innings | 0 | – | – |
| 10 wickets in match | 0 | – | – |
| Best bowling | 1/12 | – | – |
| Catches/stumpings | 6/0 | 2/– | 1/– |
- Source: ESPNcricinfo, 31 October 2021

Thomas John Lancefield (born 8 October 1990) is an English former cricketer who played as a left-handed batsman and occasional left-arm medium pace bowler. He was born in Epsom, Surrey.

Lancefield made his debut for Surrey in a List A match against Leicestershire at Grace Road in the 2009 Pro40. The following season he made his first-class debut against the touring Bangladeshis. In the following match he made his County Championship debut against Northamptonshire. In total he played 8 first-class matches during the 2010 season, scoring his maiden half century in the process.

It was in the 2010 season that he made his debut in Twenty20 cricket for Surrey against Somerset. He played four further Twenty20 matches in that season's Friends Provident t20.

On 3 May 2014 Glamorgan signed Lancefield on a one-year contract, but was released at the end of the season.
