= T20 Blast =

English professional twenty20 cricket league

- Countries: England & Wales
- Administrator: England and Wales Cricket Board
- Format: Twenty20
- First edition: 2003
- Latest edition: 2026
- Next edition: 2027
- Tournament format: Group stage and knockout
- Number of teams: 18
- Current champion: Northamptonshire Steelbacks (3rd title)
- Most successful: lei-t (3 titles); Hampshire Hawks (3 titles); Northamptonshire Steelbacks (3 titles); Somerset (3 titles)
- TV: Sky Sports; Fox Cricket (Australia); BeIN Sports (MENA); Sony Sports Network (India)
- Website: ECB Vitality Blast

The T20 Blast, also known as the Vitality Blast for sponsorship reasons, is a professional Twenty20 cricket league in England and Wales. The competition was established by the England and Wales Cricket Board (ECB) in 2003 and comprises 18 teams, with 17 in England and 1 in Wales. The competition has been known by a variety of names due to commercial sponsorship. It was known as the Twenty20 Cup from 2003 to 2009, the Friends Provident t20 and Friends Life t20 from 2010 to 2013, and the Natwest t20 Blast from 2014 to 2017.

== History ==
When the Benson & Hedges Cup ended in 2002, the ECB sought another one-day competition to fill with the younger generation in response to dwindling crowds and reduced sponsorship. The Board wanted to deliver fast-paced, exciting cricket accessible to fans who were put off by the longer versions of the game. Stuart Robertson, the marketing manager of the ECB, proposed a 20-over per innings game to county chairmen in 2001, and they voted 11–7 in favour of adopting the new format.

The first Twenty20 Cup was held in 2003 and was marketed with the slogan "I don't like cricket, I love it" – a line from the cricket-themed pop song Dreadlock Holiday by 10cc.

=== Twenty20 Cup ===
The first official Twenty20 Cup matches were played on 13 June 2003. The first season of Twenty20 in England was a success, with the Surrey Lions defeating the Warwickshire Bears by nine wickets in the final to win the first Twenty20 Cup Final. On 15 July 2004 Middlesex versus Surrey (the first Twenty20 Cup game to be held at Lord's) attracted a crowd of 26,500, the largest attendance for any county cricket game other than a one-day final since 1953. The tournament saw six different winners in its seven years.

By the end of 2009, the ECB had decided to implement a larger competition for the T20 format of the game. The Twenty20 English Premier League was a proposed cricket league to be run by the ECB consisting of 18 county teams and two overseas teams divided into two divisions with promotion and relegation. The proposal was influenced by the success of the Indian Premier League and by Allen Stanford who had organised the Stanford Super Series in the Caribbean. After the collapse of Stanford's series, the proposals were scrapped. Instead of a modified 40 over league, the Clydesdale Bank 40 was implemented.

=== Friends Provident/FriendsLife T20 ===
The Friends Provident T20 (renamed the FriendsLife T20 after just one season) was introduced in 2010. The competition initially divided the eighteen counties into North and South groups, before reverting to the previous model of three divisions of six teams. This period of Twenty20 cricket in England and Wales saw Leicestershire and Hampshire becoming the most successful teams, and in 2013 Northants won their first trophy for two decades.

=== NatWest T20 Blast ===
NatWest became the tournament sponsors in 2014, renewing the bank's longstanding relationship with the county game. The first year of the tournament saw 700,000 spectators attend the games, the most in the competition's history. The tournament was won in 2014 by the Birmingham Bears, Warwickshire County Cricket Club's name for the purposes of Twenty20 cricket, making it the first time a county trophy had been won by a team using a city name. The final victors of this branding of the tournament in 2017 were Notts Outlaws.

=== Vitality Blast ===
Vitality became the tournament sponsors in 2018, signing an initial deal to sponsor the competition for four years, with the competition becoming known as the Vitality Blast. The most recent iteration, the 2024 Vitality Blast, was the 21st season of the domestic Twenty20 cricket competition in England and Wales. The tournament started on 30 May 2024 and ended on 14 September 2024, when Gloucestershire were crowned the champions.

There are 18 teams that compete in the tournament, divided into two groups of nine.

Each team plays 14 group games, playing six teams in their group twice (both home and away) and two teams once (one at home, the other away).

The top four teams from each group qualify for the quarter-finals, with the four winners progressing to finals day.

== Trophy ==
In 2018, Vitality commissioned a range of trophies covering the domestic, international and recreational game, from London trophy maker, Thomas Lyte. The trophy is 60 cm in height and features cricket stumps and a large cricket ball as part of the design.

== Competition format ==
The 18 first-class counties compete for the title, initially playing in two or three geographical divisions, the number varying across the years. In 2018, matches were moved to be played in a block during July and August with the aim of attracting large crowds during the school summer holidays. In seasons with three divisions the top two teams in each division and the two best third place teams qualify for the playoff stage, in seasons with two divisions the top four teams in each division qualify for the playoff stage, with a set of quarter-finals leaving four teams in the competition.

In 2026, the ECB chose to do a three division format where there was a North Group, a South Group and a Midlands Group. Each group had 6 teams. The top two from every division went through and the two best 3rd place teams from the three groups. Gloucestershire and Essex got through over Lancashire for the 3rd place teams because they finished on 28 points while Lancashire finished on 26.

The two semi-finals and the final are played on one finals day at Edgbaston in September. In 2020, due to the delay in the start of the season because of the COVID-19 pandemic, matches started on 27 August in a three division format, with the quarter finals played on 1 October and the semi-finals and finals on 4 October (postponed due to rain on the third).

=== Two division format ===
==== North Group ====
- Derbyshire Falcons
- Durham
- Lancashire Lightning
- Leicestershire Foxes
- Northamptonshire Steelbacks
- Notts Outlaws (Nottinghamshire)
- Warwickshire Bears
- Worcestershire Rapids
- Yorkshire

==== South Group ====
- Essex
- Glamorgan
- Gloucestershire
- Hampshire Hawks
- Kent Spitfires
- Middlesex
- Somerset
- Surrey
- Sussex Sharks

=== Three division format ===
==== Northern Division ====
- Derbyshire Falcons
- Durham
- Lancashire Lightning
- Leicestershire Foxes
- Notts Outlaws (Nottinghamshire)
- Yorkshire

==== Central Division ====
- Glamorgan
- Gloucestershire
- Northamptonshire Steelbacks
- Somerset
- Warwickshire Bears
- Worcestershire Rapids

==== Southern Division ====
- Essex
- Hampshire Hawks
- Kent Spitfires
- Middlesex
- Surrey
- Sussex Sharks

== Winners 2003 - 2026 ==
Finals day has been held annually towards the end of the English cricket season.

Season	Winner	Winning margin	Runner-up	Venue	City	Source
2003	Surrey Lions	Won by 9 wickets	Warwickshire Bears	Trent Bridge	Nottingham	Scorecard
2004	Leicestershire Foxes	Won by 7 wickets	Surrey Lions	Edgbaston	Birmingham	Scorecard
2005	Somerset Sabres	Won by 7 wickets	Lancashire Lightning	The Oval	London	Scorecard
2006	Leicestershire Foxes	Won by 4 runs	Notts Outlaws	Trent Bridge	Nottingham	Scorecard
2007	Kent Spitfires	Won by 4 wickets	Gloucestershire Gladiators	Edgbaston	Birmingham	Scorecard
2008	Middlesex Crusaders	Won by 3 runs	Kent Spitfires	Rose Bowl	Southampton	Scorecard
2009	Sussex Sharks	Won by 63 runs	Somerset Sabres	Edgbaston	Birmingham	Scorecard
2010	Hampshire Royals	Won by losing fewer wickets (scores level)	Somerset	Rose Bowl	Southampton	Scorecard
2011	Leicestershire Foxes	Won by 18 runs	Somerset	Edgbaston	Birmingham	Scorecard
2012	Hampshire Royals	Won by 10 runs	Yorkshire Carnegie	Sophia Gardens	Cardiff	Scorecard
2013	Northants Steelbacks	Won by 102 runs (D/L)	Surrey	Edgbaston	Birmingham	Scorecard
2014	Birmingham Bears	Won by 4 runs	Lancashire Lightning	Edgbaston	Birmingham	Scorecard
2015	Lancashire Lightning	Won by 13 runs	Northants Steelbacks	Edgbaston	Birmingham	Scorecard
2016	Northants Steelbacks	Won by 4 wickets	Durham Jets	Edgbaston	Birmingham	Scorecard
2017	Notts Outlaws	Won by 22 runs	Birmingham Bears	Edgbaston	Birmingham	Scorecard
2018	Worcestershire Rapids	Won by 5 wickets	Sussex Sharks	Edgbaston	Birmingham	Scorecard
2019	Essex Eagles	Won by 4 wickets	Worcestershire Rapids	Edgbaston	Birmingham	Scorecard
2020	Notts Outlaws	Won by 6 wickets	Surrey	Edgbaston	Birmingham	Scorecard
2021	Kent Spitfires	Won by 25 runs	Somerset	Edgbaston	Birmingham	Scorecard
2022	Hampshire Hawks	Won by 1 run	Lancashire Lightning	Edgbaston	Birmingham	Scorecard
2023	Somerset	Won by 14 runs	Essex	Edgbaston	Birmingham	Scorecard
2024	Gloucestershire	Won by 8 wickets	Somerset	Edgbaston	Birmingham	Scorecard
2025	Somerset	Won by 6 wickets	Hampshire Hawks	Edgbaston	Birmingham	Scorecard
2026	Northamptonshire Steelbacks	Won by 14 runs	Hampshire Hawks	Edgbaston	Birmingham	Scorecard

== Performance by county ==
Team	03	04	05	06	07	08	09	10	11	12	13	14	15	16	17	18	19	20	21	22	23	24	25	26
Derbyshire	GP	GP	QF	GP	GP	GP	GP	GP	GP	GP	GP	GP	GP	GP	QF	GP	SF	GP	GP	QF	GP	GP	GP	GP
Durham	GP	GP	GP	GP	GP	SF	QF	GP	QF	GP	QF	GP	GP	RU	GP	QF	GP	GP	GP	GP	GP	QF	QF	GP
Essex	GP	QF	GP	SF	GP	SF	GP	SF	GP	QF	SF	QF	QF	QF	GP	GP	Won	GP	GP	QF	RU	GP	GP	QF
Glamorgan	GP	SF	GP	GP	GP	QF	GP	GP	GP	GP	GP	QF	GP	QF	SF	GP	GP	GP	GP	GP	GP	GP	GP	GP
Gloucestershire	SF	GP	GP	QF	RU	GP	GP	GP	GP	QF	GP	GP	GP	QF	GP	QF	QF	SF	GP	GP	GP	Won	GP	QF
Hampshire	GP	QF	GP	GP	GP	GP	QF	Won	SF	Won	SF	SF	SF	GP	SF	GP	GP	GP	SF	Won	SF	GP	RU	RU
Kent	GP	GP	GP	QF	Won	RU	SF	GP	QF	GP	GP	GP	QF	GP	GP	QF	GP	QF	Won	GP	GP	GP	QF	GP
Lancashire	GP	SF	RU	GP	SF	QF	QF	QF	SF	GP	QF	RU	Won	GP	GP	SF	QF	SF	QF	RU	QF	QF	SF	GP
Leicestershire	SF	Won	SF	Won	GP	GP	GP	GP	Won	GP	GP	GP	GP	GP	QF	GP	GP	QF	GP	GP	GP	GP	GP	GP
Middlesex	GP	GP	QF	GP	GP	Won	GP	GP	GP	GP	GP	GP	GP	QF	GP	GP	QF	GP	GP	GP	GP	GP	GP	GP
Northamptonshire	GP	GP	QF	QF	GP	QF	SF	QF	GP	GP	Won	GP	RU	Won	GP	GP	GP	QF	GP	GP	GP	QF	SF	Won
Nottinghamshire	GP	GP	GP	RU	QF	GP	GP	SF	QF	QF	QF	QF	GP	SF	Won	QF	SF	Won	QF	GP	QF	GP	GP	SF
Somerset	GP	GP	Won	GP	GP	GP	RU	RU	RU	SF	QF	GP	GP	GP	QF	SF	GP	GP	RU	SF	Won	RU	Won	SF
Surrey	Won	RU	SF	SF	GP	GP	GP	GP	GP	GP	RU	SF	GP	GP	QF	GP	GP	RU	GP	QF	SF	SF	QF	QF
Sussex	GP	GP	GP	GP	SF	GP	Won	QF	QF	SF	GP	GP	QF	GP	GP	RU	QF	QF	SF	GP	GP	SF	GP	GP
Worcestershire	GP	QF	GP	GP	QF	GP	GP	GP	GP	QF	GP	QF	QF	GP	GP	Won	RU	GP	GP	GP	QF	GP	GP	GP
Yorkshire	GP	GP	GP	QF	QF	GP	GP	GP	GP	RU	GP	GP	GP	SF	GP	GP	GP	GP	QF	SF	GP	GP	GP	QF
Warwickshire	RU	QF	QF	GP	QF	QF	QF	QF	GP	GP	GP	Won	SF	GP	RU	GP	GP	GP	QF	QF	QF	QF	QF	GP
