= Will Owen (cricketer) =

Welsh cricketer

Personal information
- Full name: William Thomas Owen
- Born: 2 September 1988 (age 38); St Asaph, Wales
- Batting: Right-handed
- Bowling: Right-arm medium pace
- Role: Bowler

Domestic team information
- Years: Team
- 2007–2015: Glamorgan (squad no. 34)
- 2016–: Cheshire
- First-class debut: 19 September 2007 Glamorgan v Gloucestershire
- Last First-class: 20 July 2014 Glamorgan v Derbyshire
- List A debut: 16 May 2010 Glamorgan v Unicorns
- Last List A: 19 June 2013 Glamorgan v Leicestershire

Career statistics
Competition	FC	LA	T20
Matches	24	25	23
Runs scored	363	78	8
Batting average	19.10	13.00	8.00
100s/50s	0/1	0/0	0/0
Top score	69	13*	8
Balls bowled	3,136	771	360
Wickets	51	37	17
Bowling average	43.94	21.13	34.11
5 wickets in innings	1	1	0
10 wickets in match	0	–	–
Best bowling	5/124	5/49	3/21
Catches/stumpings	6/–	6/–	0/–
- Source: CricketArchive, 17 August 2015

William Thomas Owen (born 2 September 1988) is a Welsh cricketer who plays for Cheshire. He is a right-handed batsman and a right-arm medium pace bowler.

Born in St Asaph, Clwyd, Owen attended Prestatyn High School and began his cricket career playing for Prestatyn Cricket Club. He was soon spotted by the Glamorgan scouts and began playing for their second XI in 2006. In 2007, he made his debut for Wales Minor Counties and at the end of the season, he made his first-class debut for Glamorgan, playing in their final County Championship match of the season against Gloucestershire.

That year, Owen began a degree course at UWIC in Cardiff, and therefore divided his time in the 2008 season between playing for the Cardiff University Centre of Cricketing Excellence, the Glamorgan 2nd XI, Wales Minor Counties, Pentyrch and Prestatyn. The 2009 season saw him continue to turn out for Wales Minor Counties and the Glamorgan 2nd XI, but he played his club cricket for Abergavenny.

In 2010, Owen returned to the Glamorgan 1st XI, almost three years after his debut. He made his return in a Clydesdale Bank 40 match against Unicorns at Dean Park, Bournemouth, on 16 May 2010, taking five wickets for 39 runs, and then scoring 12 runs off 12 balls; however, Glamorgan lost by 58 runs. The following week, he returned to first-class cricket with a County Championship match away to Leicestershire, and although he took no wickets and made no runs, Glamorgan won by 10 wickets. His Twenty20 debut came on 11 June, in Glamorgan's third match of the 2010 Friends Provident t20 away to the Essex Eagles; his bowling conceded 36 runs in two overs, but he did not bat as Glamorgan won by 7 wickets.

He was forced to retire from professional cricket in August 2015 as a result of long-term back and hip injuries. However, he made a comeback in the 2016 season, signing for Cheshire and Chester Boughton Hall.

== Career best performances ==
	Batting				Bowling			
	Score	Fixture	Venue	Season	Score	Fixture	Venue	Season
FC	69	Glamorgan v Derbyshire	Derby	2011	5–124	Glamorgan v Middlesex	Cardiff	2011
LA	13*	Glamorgan v Leicestershire Foxes	Leicester	2013	5–49	Glamorgan Dragons v Unicorns	Bournemouth	2010
T20	8	Glamorgan Dragons v Somerset	Taunton	2010	3–21	Glamorgan Dragons v Gloucestershire Gladiators	Cardiff	2011
