= 2010 Twenty20 Cup =

2010 Friends Provident t20
- Dates: 2 June 2010 – 13 August 2010
- Administrator: England and Wales Cricket Board
- Cricket format: Twenty20
- Tournament format(s): Group stage and knockout
- Champions: Hampshire Royals (1st title)
- Participants: 18
- Matches: 151
- Attendance: 676,753 (4,482 per match)
- Most runs: 668 – Jimmy Adams (Hampshire)
- Most wickets: 33 – Alfonso Thomas (Somerset)

The 2010 Friends Provident t20 tournament was the eighth edition of what would later become the T20 Blast, England's premier domestic Twenty20 cricket competition.

The competition ran from 1 June 2010 until the finals day at The Rose Bowl on 14 August 2010. The eighteen counties were split into two regions, North and South. Group members played each other twice, with the top four teams from each group progressing to the quarter-final knockout stage. The change in format meant a rise in the number of matches played, from 97 to 151.

The competition was won by Hampshire Royals, who beat Essex Eagles in the semi-finals, and Somerset in the final, by virtue of losing fewer wickets in a tied match.

== Teams ==
=== Team summaries ===
Team	Location	Stadium	Stadium capacity	Head coach	Captain
Derbyshire Falcons	Derby	County Ground, Derby	9,500	John Morris	
Durham Dynamos	Chester-le-Street	Emirates Durham International Cricket Ground	19,000	Geoff Cook	Phil Mustard
Essex Eagles	Chelmsford	County Cricket Ground, Chelmsford	6,500	Paul Grayson	James Foster
Glamorgan Dragons	Cardiff	SWALEC Stadium	16,000	Matthew Mott	Alviro Petersen
Gloucestershire Gladiators	Bristol	Nevil Road	16,000	Alex Gidman	James Franklin
Hampshire Royals	West End	The Rose Bowl	25,000	Giles White	Dominic Cork
Kent Spitfires	Canterbury	St Lawrence Ground	15,000	Paul Farbrace	Rob Key
Lancashire Lightning	Manchester	Old Trafford	19,000	Peter Moores	Glen Chapple
Leicestershire Foxes	Leicester	Grace Road	12,000	Tim Boon	Matthew Hoggard
Middlesex Panthers	London	Lord's	28,000	Richard Scott	Neil Dexter
Northamptonshire Steelbacks	Northampton	County Cricket Ground, Northampton	6,500	David Capel	Andrew Hall
Nottinghamshire Outlaws	Nottingham	Trent Bridge	17,500	Mick Newell	David Hussey
Somerset	Taunton	Taunton	6,500	Andy Hurry	Marcus Trescothick
Surrey Lions	London	The Oval	23,000	Chris Adams	Rory Hamilton-Brown
Sussex Sharks	Hove	Hove	7,000	Mark Robinson	Michael Yardy
Warwickshire Bears	Birmingham	Edgbaston	25,000	Ashley Giles	Ian Bell
Worcestershire Royals	Worcester	New Road	4,500	Steve Rhodes	Daryl Mitchell
Yorkshire Carnegie	Leeds	Headingley	17,500	Martyn Moxon	Andrew Gale

== Group stage ==
=== North Group ===
Pos	Team	Pld	W	L	T	NR	Pts	NRR
1	Warwickshire Bears	16	11	4	0	1	23	0.403
2	Nottinghamshire Outlaws	16	10	4	2	0	22	0.640
3	Lancashire Lightning	16	9	6	0	1	19	0.479
4	Northamptonshire Steelbacks	16	7	6	3	0	17	−0.160
5	Derbyshire Falcons	16	6	8	0	2	14	−0.151
6	Yorkshire Carnegie	16	6	9	1	0	13	−0.121
7	Leicestershire Foxes	16	6	9	0	1	13	−0.234
8	Durham Dynamos	16	4	8	0	4	12	−0.296
9	Worcestershire Royals	16	5	10	0	1	11	−0.653

=== Results ===
2 June
Scorecard

Derbyshire Falcons; 165/5 (20 overs)	v	Leicestershire Foxes; 154/8 (20 overs)
Loots Bosman 39 (37); Andrew McDonald 2/41 (4 overs)		Andrew McDonald 67 (50); Steffan Jones 3/20 (4 overs)

Derbyshire Falcons won by 11 runs
Grace Road, Leicester
Umpires: Mark Benson and Nick Cook
Player of the match: Andrew McDonald (Leics Foxes)

- Leicestershire Foxes won the toss and elected to field.

3 June
Scorecard

Northamptonshire Steelbacks; 147/5 (20 overs)	v	Warwickshire Bears; 151/2 (14.1 overs)
Mal Loye 54 (48); Imran Tahir 3/14 (4 overs)		Darren Maddy 88 (42); Lee Daggett 1/32 (4 overs)

Warwickshire Bears won by 8 wickets
Edgbaston, Birmingham
Umpires: David Millns and Martin Bodenham
Player of the match: Darren Maddy (Warwickshire Bears)

- Northamptonshire Steelbacks won the toss and elected to bat.
- Jack Brooks and Vishal Tripathi (Northamptonshire Steelbacks) made their T20 debuts.

3 June
Scorecard

Derbyshire Falcons; 222/5 (20 overs)	v	Yorkshire Carnegie; 157 (17.5 overs)
Loots Bosman 94 (50); Clint McKay 4/33 (4 overs)		Herschelle Gibbs 36 (28); Greg Smith 3/19 (2.5 overs)

Derbyshire Falcons won by 65 runs
Headingley, Leeds
Umpires: Nigel Cowley and Rob Bailey
Player of the match: Loots Bosman (Derbyshire Falcons)

- Yorkshire Carnegie won the toss and elected to field.
- Jonny Bairstow (Yorkshire Carnegie) made his T20 debut.

4 June
Scorecard

Worcestershire Royals; 208/7 (20 overs)	v	Yorkshire Carnegie; 187/7 (20 overs)
James Cameron 51* (31); Adil Rashid 3/32 (4 overs)		Anthony McGrath 39 (36); Gareth Andrew 2/26 (3 overs)

Worcestershire Royals won by 21 runs
New Road, Worcester
Umpires: Barry Dudleston and Vanburn Holder
Player of the match: James Cameron (Worcs Royals)

- Worcestershire Royals won the toss and elected to bat.
- Jack Shantry, Imran Arif and James Cameron (Worcestershire Royals) made their T20 debuts.

4 June
Scorecard

Lancashire Lightning; 179/4 (20 overs)	v	Durham Dynamos; 156/8 (20 overs)
Stephen Moore 83* (52); Steve Harmison 1/20 (3 overs)		Phil Mustard 47 (38); Steven Croft 3/18 (3 overs)

Lancashire Lightning won by 23 runs
Riverside Ground, Chester-le-Street
Umpires: Nigel Cowley and Steve Garratt
Player of the match: Stephen Moore (Lancs Lightning)

- Lancashire Lightning won the toss and elected to bat.
- Ben Stokes (Durham Dynamos) and Simon Kerrigan (Lancashire Lightning) made their T20 debuts.

6 June
Scorecard

Durham Dynamos	v	Worcestershire Royals

No result
Riverside Ground, Chester-le-Street
Umpires: Nigel Cowley and Steve Garratt

- Worcestershire Royals won the toss and elected to field.
- No play possible due to rain.

8 June (D/N)
Scorecard

Leicestershire Foxes; 149/8 (18 overs)	v	Northamptonshire Steelbacks; 137/9 (18 overs)
Andrew McDonald 49 (35); Chaminda Vaas 2/24 (4 overs)		Mal Loye 39 (40); Nadeem Malik 4/25 (4 overs)

Leicestershire Foxes won by 12 runs
County Ground, Northampton
Umpires: Mark Benson and Richard Illingworth
Player of the match: Claude Henderson (Leics Foxes)

- Leicestershire Foxes won the toss and elected to bat.
- The match was reduced to 18 overs per side due to rain.

=== South Group ===
Pos	Team	Pld	W	L	T	NR	Pts	NRR
1	Somerset	16	11	5	0	0	22	0.418
2	Essex Eagles	16	10	6	0	0	20	0.395
3	Sussex Sharks	16	9	7	0	0	18	0.606
4	Hampshire Royals	16	8	8	0	0	16	0.385
5	Surrey Lions	16	8	8	0	0	16	0.183
6	Middlesex Crusaders	16	8	8	0	0	16	0.018
7	Kent Spitfires	16	7	9	0	0	14	−0.163
8	Glamorgan Dragons	16	6	10	0	0	12	−0.979
9	Gloucestershire Gladiators	16	5	11	0	0	10	−0.943

=== Results ===
1 June (D/N)
Scorecard

Sussex Sharks; 155/7 (20 overs)	v	Somerset; 103 (17.1 overs)
Luke Wright 39 (19); Murali Kartik 2/21 (4 overs)		Craig Kieswetter 47 (41); James Kirtley 3/3 (1.1 overs)

Sussex Sharks won by 52 runs
County Ground, Hove
Umpires: Nigel Llong and Richard Kettleborough
Player of the match: Luke Wright (Sussex Sharks)

- Somerset won the toss and elected to field.

2 June (D/N)
Scorecard

Essex Eagles; 167/9 (20 overs)	v	Kent Spitfires; 170/4 (18.4 overs)
Ryan ten Doeschate 98 (47); Simon Cook 2/15 (4 overs)		Geraint Jones 54 (34); Graham Napier 2/40 (3.4 overs)

Kent Spitfires won by 6 wickets
County Ground, Chelmsford
Umpires: George Sharp and Richard Illingworth
Player of the match: Ryan ten Doeschate (Essex Eagles)

- Kent Spitfires won the toss and elected to field.
- Alex Blake (Kent Spitfires) and Michael Comber (Essex Eagles) made their T20 debuts.

3 June (D/N)
Scorecard

Sussex Sharks; 146/6 (20 overs)	v	Middlesex Crusaders; 118/6 (20 overs)
Dwayne Smith 49 (38); Pedro Collins 3/27 (4 overs)		Neil Dexter 27 (32); Michael Yardy 2/14 (4 overs)

Sussex Sharks won by 28 runs
Lord's, London
Umpires: Jeremy Lloyds and Tim Robinson
Player of the match: Michael Yardy (Sussex Sharks)

- Sussex Sharks won the toss and elected to bat.

3 June (D/N)
Scorecard

Kent Spitfires; 114/9 (20 overs)	v	Hampshire Royals; 117/5 (19.4 overs)
Darren Stevens 36 (34); Abdul Razzaq 2/16 (3 overs)		Sean Ervine 31 (23); Darren Stevens 2/20 (4 overs); James Tredwell 2/20 (4 overs)

Hampshire Royals won by 5 wickets
Rose Bowl, Southampton
Umpires: Michael Gough and Trevor Jesty
Player of the match: Chris Wood (Hampshire Royals)

- Kent Spitfires won the toss and elected to bat.
- Chris Wood, Danny Briggs (Hampshire Royals) and Matt Coles (Kent Spitfires) made their T20 debuts.

4 June (D/N)
Scorecard

Gloucestershire Gladiators; 148/6 (20 overs)	v	Glamorgan Dragons; 151/4 (19.1 overs)
James Franklin 42 (30); Jim Allenby 3/23 (4 overs)		Jim Allenby 54 (45); Alex Gidman 1/17 (2 overs)

Glamorgan Dragons won by 6 wickets
Sophia Gardens, Cardiff
Umpires: Mark Benson and Nick Cook
Player of the match: Jim Allenby (Glamorgan Dragons)

- Gloucestershire Gladiators won the toss and elected to bat.

8 June
Scorecard

Surrey Lions; 97 (18.1 overs)	v	Gloucestershire Gladiators; 98/0 (9.5 overs)
Rory Hamilton-Brown 41 (39); Ian Butler 3/8 (3.1 overs)		William Porterfield 47* (31)

Gloucestershire Gladiators won by 10 wickets
The Oval, London
Umpires: John Steele and Peter Hartley
Player of the match: Ian Butler (Gloucs Gladiators)

- Gloucestershire Gladiators won the toss and elected to field.

8 June (D/N)
Scorecard

Hampshire Royals; 114/9 (20 overs)	v	Glamorgan Dragons; 115/3 (19.2 overs)
Michael Carberry 34 (48); Robert Croft 2/16 (4 overs)		Jim Allenby 52* (55); Danny Briggs 2/26 (4 overs)

Glamorgan Dragons won by 7 wickets
Sophia Gardens, Cardiff
Umpires: Steve Garratt and Tim Robinson
Player of the match: Jim Allenby (Glamorgan Dragons)

- Hampshire Royals won the toss and elected to bat.

== Knockout stage ==
Quarter-finals
26 July – Birmingham
Warwickshire Bears	153/5 (20 ov)
Hampshire Royals	154/5 (19.5 ov)
27 July – Chelmsford
Lancashire Lightning	183/6 (20 ov)
Essex Eagles	184/2 (19.1 ov)
26 July – Nottingham
Nottinghamshire Outlaws	141/9 (20 ov)
Sussex Sharks	128/7 (20 ov)
27 July – Taunton
Northamptonshire Steelbacks	112/6 (20 ov)
Somerset	115/3 (17 ov)

Semi-finals
14 August – Southampton
Hampshire Royals	157/4 (19.2 ov)
Essex Eagles	156/7 (20 ov)
14 August – Southampton
Nottinghamshire Outlaws	117/4 (13 ov)
Somerset (D/L)	182/5 (20 ov)

Final
14 August – Southampton
Hampshire Royals	173/5 (20 ov)
Somerset	173/6 (20 ov)

=== Quarter-finals ===
26 July
16:40
Scorecard

Warwickshire Bears; 153/5 (20 overs)	v	Hampshire Royals; 154/5 (19.5 overs)
Darren Maddy 44 (31); Danny Briggs 3/29 (4 overs)		James Vince 66* (52); Steffan Piolet 2/32 (4 overs)

Hampshire won by 5 wickets
Edgbaston, Birmingham
Umpires: Rob Bailey and Richard Kettleborough
Player of the match: James Vince (Hants)

- Hampshire won the toss and elected to field.

26 July
19:25
Scorecard

Nottinghamshire Outlaws; 141/9 (20 overs)	v	Sussex Sharks; 128/7 (20 overs)
Matt Wood 36 (37); Yasir Arafat 4/34 (4 overs)		Murray Goodwin 28 (27); Darren Pattinson 3/17 (3 overs)

Nottinghamshire won by 13 runs
Trent Bridge, Nottingham
Umpires: Richard Illingworth and Jeremy Lloyds
Player of the match: Steven Mullaney (Notts)

- Sussex won the toss and elected to field.

27 July
16:50
Scorecard

Northamptonshire Steelbacks; 112/6 (20 overs)	v	Somerset; 115/3 (17 overs)
Stephen Peters 40* (34); Mark Turner 1/8 (2 overs)		Craig Kieswetter 33 (28); James Middlebrook 2/30 (4 overs)

Somerset won by 7 wickets
County Ground, Taunton
Umpires: Peter Hartley and Tim Robinson
Player of the match: Murali Kartik and Arul Suppiah (Somst)

- Northamptonshire won the toss and elected to bat.

27 July
19:40
Scorecard

Lancashire Lightning; 183/6 (20 overs)	v	Essex Eagles; 184/2 (19.1 overs)
Paul Horton 44 (30); Chris Wright 4/25 (4 overs)		Mark Pettini 81 (56); Sajid Mahmood 1/29 (4 overs)

Essex won by 8 wickets
County Ground, Chelmsford
Umpires: Jeff Evans and Nigel Llong
Player of the match: Mark Pettini and Matt Walker (Essex)

- Essex won the toss and elected to field.

=== Semi-finals ===
14 August
11:40
Scorecard

Essex Eagles; 156/7 (20 overs)	v	Hampshire Royals; 157/4 (19.2 overs)
Mark Pettini 55 (43); Danny Briggs 3/29 (4 overs)		Abdul Razzaq 44 (31); Ravi Bopara 1/27 (4 overs)

Hampshire won by 6 wickets
The Rose Bowl, Southampton
Umpires: Rob Bailey and Neil Mallender
Player of the match: Danny Briggs (Hants)

- Hampshire won the toss and elected to field.

14 August
16:00
Scorecard

Somerset; 182/5 (20 overs)	v	Nottinghamshire Outlaws; 117/4 (13 overs)
Marcus Trescothick 60 (28); Graeme Swann 2/24 (4 overs)		Samit Patel 39 (26); Alfonso Thomas 2/23 (3 overs)

Somerset won by 3 runs (D/L method)
The Rose Bowl, Southampton
Umpires: Richard Illingworth and Nigel Llong
Player of the match: Jos Buttler (Somst)

- Nottinghamshire won the toss and elected to field.

=== Final ===
14 August
19:25 (D/N)
Scorecard

Somerset; 173/6 (20 overs)	v	Hampshire Royals; 173/5 (20 overs)
Craig Kieswetter 71 (59); Dominic Cork 2/24 (4 overs)		Neil McKenzie 52 (39); Ben Phillips 2/44 (4 overs)

Scores level; Hampshire Royals won by losing fewer wickets
The Rose Bowl, Southampton
Umpires: Rob Bailey and Richard Illingworth
Player of the match: Neil McKenzie (Hants)

- Somerset won the toss and elected to bat.

== Players statistics ==
=== Most runs ===
Player	Team	Runs	Highest Score
Jimmy Adams	Hampshire Royals	668	101*
Marcus Trescothick	Somerset	572	83
Mark Cosgrove	Glamorgan Dragons	562	89
Tom Smith	Lancashire Lightning	543	92*
David Hussey	Nottinghamshire Outlaws	524	81*
Ravi Bopara	Essex Eagles	473	105*
James Franklin	Gloucestershire Gladiators	470	90
Sean Ervine	Hampshire Royals	470	74
Alex Hales	Nottinghamshire Outlaws	466	83
Samit Patel	Nottinghamshire Outlaws	459	63
James Hildreth	Somerset	459	77*
Source: Cricinfo

=== Most sixes ===
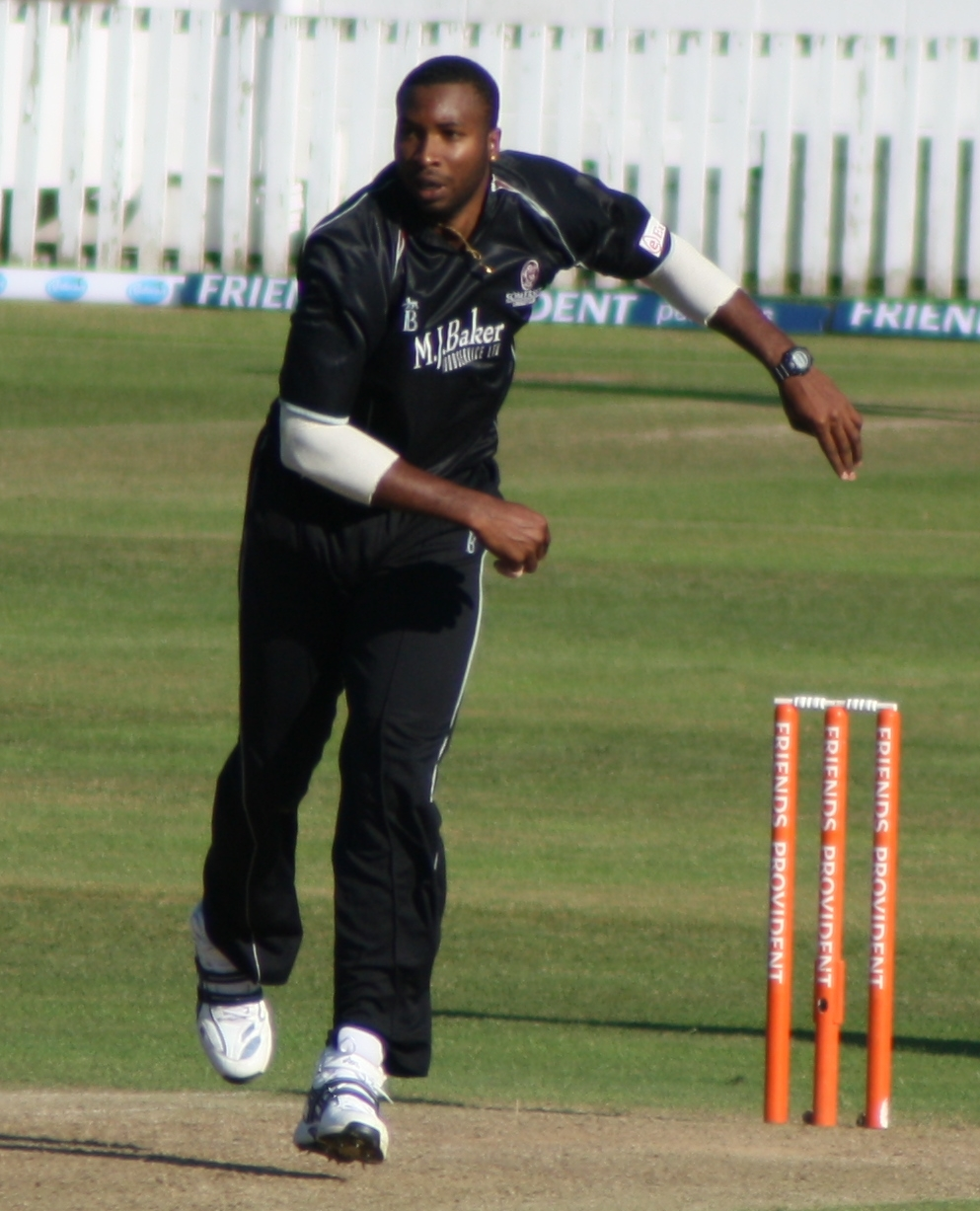
Kieron Pollard scored the most sixes in the competition.

Player	Team	Sixes	Strike rate
Kieron Pollard	Somerset	29	175.24
Scott Styris	Essex Eagles	24	161.98
Ross Taylor	Durham Dynamos	23	173.07
Marcus Trescothick	Somerset	22	157.14
Tom Maynard	Glamorgan Dragons	20	150.19
Ryan ten Doeschate	Essex Eagles	19	177.24
David Hussey	Nottinghamshire Outlaws	19	142.00
Matt Prior	Sussex Sharks	18	169.08
Darren Maddy	Warwickshire Bears	18	132.55
Jimmy Adams	Hampshire Royals	17	132.27
Source: Cricinfo

=== Most wickets ===
Player	Team	Wickets	Average
Alfonso Thomas	Somerset	33	13.93
Danny Briggs	Hampshire Royals	31	14.35
Kieron Pollard	Somerset	29	15.10
Stephen Parry	Lancashire Lightning	26	16.42
Adil Rashid	Yorkshire Carnegie	26	16.46
Chris Tremlett	Surrey Lions	24	17.12
Chaminda Vaas	Northamptonshire Steelbacks	23	15.82
Sajid Mahmood	Lancashire Lightning	23	18.69
Robert Croft	Glamorgan Dragons	22	15.59
Keith Barker	Warwickshire Bears	21	16.66
Source: Cricinfo

== See also ==
- Twenty20 Cup
- 2009 Twenty20 Cup
