= Kent County Cricket Club in 2008 =

Kent County Cricket Club
2008 season
- Coach: (South Africa) Graham Ford
- Captain: (England) Rob Key
- Overseas player: (Pakistan) Yasir Arafat
- Ground(s): St Lawrence Ground, Canterbury; Nevill Ground, Tunbridge Wells; County Ground, Beckenham
- County Championship: 8th, Division One (relegated)
- Friends Provident Trophy: Runners-up
- Natwest Pro40: 4th, Division Two
- Twenty20 Cup: Runners-up
- Most runs: FC: M van Jaarsveld (1,150); LA: M van Jaarsveld (907); T20: JL Denly (451)
- Most wickets: FC: RH Joseph (55); LA: Yasir Arafat (27); T20: Yasir Arafat (23)
- Most catches: FC: M van Jaarsveld (28); LA: DI Stevens (7); T20: M van Jaarsveld (8)
- Most wicket-keeping dismissals: FC: GO Jones (67); LA: GO Jones (28); T20: GO Jones (10)

In 2008, Kent County Cricket Club competed in Division One of the County Championship, the South-East Division of the 50-over Friends Provident Trophy, Division Two of the NatWest Pro40 and the South Division of the Twenty20 Cup. Kent also hosted a three-day first-class match against the touring New Zealanders and a three-day match without first-class status against Leeds/Bradford UCCE, both at the St Lawrence Ground.

Kent were relegated from Division One of the County Championship, finishing second from bottom. They performed more strongly in limited overs cricket, finishing fourth in Division Two of the NatWest Pro40 and reaching the final of both the Twenty20 Cup and the Friends Provident Trophy, where they were defeated by Middlesex and Essex, respectively. Kent had been the defending champions in the Twenty20 Cup.

== Squad ==
Former Pakistan international all-rounder Azhar Mahmood signed a contract with Kent in November 2007 and, having recently applied for British citizenship, he would not count as an overseas player. South African all-rounder Justin Kemp, who played for Kent in 2005 and 2006, re-signed for the county on a two-year deal in February as a Kolpak player.

Left-arm spinner Min Patel announced his retirement in February, ending a 19-year career with Kent that included two Test caps for England and a total of 630 first-class wickets.

Neil Dexter signed for Essex on a one-month load in June and this was subsequently extended. After becoming frustrated at a lack of first XI opportunities, Dexter turned down a new contract at the end of the season and went on to sign for Middlesex.

Batsman Matt Walker was released in September after 20 years with Kent, and having made his first-team debut in 1992. Walker went on to sign for Essex. The 2008 season would also be the second and last with Kent for Yasir Arafat, before he re-signed for Sussex.

=== Squad list ===
- Ages given as of the first day of the County Championship season, 16 April 2008.

| Name | Nationality | Birth date | Batting style | Bowling style | Notes |
Batsmen
| Alex Blake | England | 25 January 1989 (aged 19) | Left-handed | Right arm medium-fast | |
| Joe Denly | England | 16 March 1986 (aged 22) | Right-handed | Right arm leg break | |
| Neil Dexter | England | 21 August 1984 (aged 23) | Right-handed | Right arm medium-fast | |
| James Goodman | England | 19 November 1990 (aged 17) | Right-handed | Right arm medium | |
| Rob Key | England | 12 May 1979 (aged 28) | Right-handed | Right arm off break | Club captain |
| Sam Northeast | England | 16 October 1989 (aged 18) | Right-handed | Right arm off break | |
| Martin van Jaarsveld | South Africa | 18 June 1974 (aged 33) | Right-handed | Right arm medium / Right arm off break | Kolpak player, vice-captain |
| Matt Walker | England | 2 January 1974 (aged 34) | Left-handed | Right arm medium | |
All-rounders
| Azhar Mahmood | Pakistan | 28 February 1975 (aged 33) | Right-handed | Right arm fast-medium | British citizen |
| Justin Kemp | South Africa | 2 October 1977 (aged 30) | Right-handed | Right arm fast-medium | Kolpak player |
| Ryan McLaren | South Africa | 9 February 1983 (aged 25) | Left-handed | Right arm medium-fast | Kolpak player |
| Darren Stevens | England | 30 April 1976 (aged 31) | Right-handed | Right arm medium | |
| Yasir Arafat | Pakistan | 12 March 1982 (aged 26) | Right-handed | Right arm fast-medium | Overseas player |
Wicket-keepers
| Paul Dixey | England | 2 November 1987 (aged 20) | Right-handed | — | |
| Geraint Jones | England | 14 July 1979 (aged 28) | Right-handed | — | |
Bowlers
| Simon Cook | England | 15 January 1977 (aged 31) | Right-handed | Right arm medium-fast | |
| James Iles | England | 11 February 1990 (aged 18) | Right-handed | Right arm medium-fast | |
| Robbie Joseph | England | 20 January 1982 (aged 26) | Right-handed | Right arm fast | |
| Amjad Khan | England | 14 October 1980 (aged 27) | Right-handed | Right arm fast-medium | |
| Martin Saggers | England | 23 May 1972 (aged 35) | Right-handed | Right arm fast-medium | |
| James Tredwell | England | 27 February 1982 (aged 26) | Left-handed | Right arm off break | |

== County Championship ==
=== Division One ===
| P | Team | Pld | W | L | Tie | D | Aban | Bat | Bowl | Deduct | Pts | Promoted / Relegated |
|---|---|---|---|---|---|---|---|---|---|---|---|---|
| 1 | Durham | 16 | 6 | 3 | 0 | 6 | 1 | 37 | 41 | 0 | 190 | Winners of Championship |
| 2 | Nottinghamshire | 16 | 5 | 3 | 0 | 7 | 1 | 37 | 43 | 0 | 182 | |
| 3 | Hampshire | 16 | 5 | 4 | 0 | 7 | 0 | 33 | 47 | 0 | 178 | |
| 4 | Somerset | 16 | 3 | 2 | 0 | 11 | 0 | 44 | 44 | 0 | 174 | |
| 5 | Lancashire | 16 | 5 | 2 | 0 | 8 | 1 | 24 | 40 | 0 | 170 | |
| 6 | Sussex | 16 | 2 | 2 | 0 | 12 | 0 | 45 | 38 | 0 | 159 | |
| 7 | Yorkshire | 16 | 2 | 5 | 0 | 9 | 0 | 50 | 45 | 0 | 159 | |
| 8 | Kent | 16 | 4 | 6 | 0 | 6 | 0 | 30 | 44 | 0 | 154 | Relegated to Championship Division 2 |
| 9 | Surrey | 16 | 0 | 5 | 0 | 10 | 1 | 45 | 36 | 1 | 124 | Relegated to Championship Division 2 |

Rules for classification: 1^{st} points; 2^{nd} matches won; 3^{rd} fewest defeats
P = Position; Pld = Matches played; W = Matches won; L = Matches lost; Tie = Matches tied; D = Matches drawn; Aban = Matches abandoned; Deduct = Points deducted; Pts = Points

=== Matches ===
| 16–19 April | Kent (H) | v | Nottinghamshire | Nottinghamshire won by 10 wickets |
| Scorecard | 162 (53.4 overs); RWT Key 79 (163); Darren Pattinson 5/22 (13 overs) | | 434/9d (128 overs); MA Ealham 130* (216); DI Stevens 4/70 (24 overs) | St Lawrence Ground, Canterbury; Umpires: TE Jesty and NJ Llong |
| Scorecard | 293 (88.5 overs); Azhar Mahmood 116 (160); Darren Pattinson 3/63 (23 overs) | | 24/0 (5.4 overs); Matt Wood 17* (20) | St Lawrence Ground, Canterbury; Umpires: TE Jesty and NJ Llong |
Kent won the toss and elected to bat; Points: Kent 3, Nottinghamshire 22

| 23–26 April | Sussex (H) | v | Kent | Match drawn |
| Scorecard | 303 (100.1 overs); MJ Prior 105 (176); Yasir Arafat 4/88 (22 overs) | | 204 (72.1 overs); Geraint Jones 51* (117); Mushtaq Ahmed 5/83 (29.1 overs) | County Ground, Hove; Umpires: IA Gould and JW Lloyds |
| Scorecard | 237 (66.4 overs); MJ Prior 59 (88); Azhar Mahmood 5/30 (9.4 overs) | | 193/3 (63 overs); M van Jaarsveld 82* (148); Mushtaq Ahmed 2/74 (24 overs) | County Ground, Hove; Umpires: IA Gould and JW Lloyds |
Kent won the toss and elected to field; Points: Sussex 10, Kent 8

| 7–10 May | Nottinghamshire (H) | v | Kent | Kent won by 3 wickets |
| Scorecard | 202 (82.4 overs); AC Voges 43 (86); DI Stevens 3/42 (24 overs) | | 238 (76.2 overs); Yasir Arafat 67 (93); RJ Sidebottom 5/55 (23 overs) | Trent Bridge, Nottingham; Umpires: NL Bainton and RK Illingworth |
| Scorecard | 279 (89.1 overs); CMW Read 88 (132); R McLaren 6/75 (21.1 overs) | | 244/7 (71.3 overs); M van Jaarsveld 63 (98); SCJ Broad 3/59 (15 overs) | Trent Bridge, Nottingham; Umpires: NL Bainton and RK Illingworth |
Nottinghamshire won the toss and elected to bat; Points: Nottinghamshire 4, Kent 18

| 21–24 May | Somerset | v | (H) Kent | Somerset won by 20 runs |
| Scorecard | 208 (57.3 overs); PD Trego 49 (57); R McLaren 5/31 (12.3 overs) | | 273 (88.1 overs); M van Jaarsveld 95 (199); PD Trego 4/52 (22 overs) | Nevill Ground, Tunbridge Wells; Umpires: RJ Bailey and B Leadbeater |
| Scorecard | 335 (95.4 overs); ME Trescothick 139 (249); 3/59 (19 overs) | | R McLaren 250 (73.5 overs); JL Denly 149 (233); PS Jones 5/63 (17.3 overs) | Nevill Ground, Tunbridge Wells; Umpires: RJ Bailey and B Leadbeater |
Somerset won the toss and elected to bat; Points: Kent 5, Somerset 18

| 30 May – 2 June | Kent | v | (H) Hampshire | Match drawn |
| Scorecard | 431/8d (107.4 overs); M van Jaarsveld 133 (234); JA Tomlinson 3/116 (22.4 overs) | | 215 (75.1 overs); AD Mascarenhas 45 (69); R McLaren 4/49 (21 overs) | Rose Bowl, Southampton; Umpires: JW Holder and JW Lloyds |
| Scorecard | | | 33/0 (12.5 overs) (f/o); MJ Brown 21* (39) | Rose Bowl, Southampton; Umpires: JW Holder and JW Lloyds |
Hampshire won the toss and elected to field; No play on day 1 due to rain; Points: Hampshire 7, Kent 12

| 6–9 June | Kent (H) | v | Sussex | Match drawn |
| Scorecard | 350/8d (95.5 overs); JM Kemp 102 (156); RG Aga 4/63 (16.5 overs) | | 300/8d (85.1 overs); CD Hopkinson 69 (117); R McLaren 3/42 (15 overs) | St Lawrence Ground, Canterbury; Umpires: RK Illingworth and NA Mallender |
| Scorecard | 14/1 (17.1 overs); JL Denly 8 (11); RSC Martin-Jenkins 1/1 (3.1 overs) | | | St Lawrence Ground, Canterbury; Umpires: RK Illingworth and NA Mallender |
Sussex won the toss and elected to field; No play on day 1 due to rain; Points: Kent 10, Sussex 9

| 29 June – 2 July | Surrey (H) | v | Kent | Kent won by 4 wickets |
| Scorecard | 397 (132.3 overs); JN Batty 136* (343); JC Tredwell 3/79 (29 overs) | | 270 (66.1 overs); M van Jaarsveld 114* (159); Saqlain Mushtaq 5/79 (21 overs) | The Oval, Kennington, London; Umpires: RJ Bailey and JH Evans |
| Scorecard | 130 (39.3 overs); SA Newman 72 (101); M van Jaarsveld 5/33 (13 overs) | | 260/6 (65.5 overs); M van Jaarsveld 115* (157); PT Collins 2/44 (11 overs) | The Oval, Kennington, London; Umpires: RJ Bailey and JH Evans |
Surrey won the toss and elected to bat; Points: Surrey 7, Kent 18

| 11–14 July | Yorkshire | v | (H) Kent | Kent won by 3 wickets |
| Scorecard | 410 (109.4 overs); A McGrath 144 (226); Azhar Mahmood 6/55 (24.4 overs) | | 467 (121 overs); RWT Key 157 (267); AU Rashid 5/140 (35 overs) | St Lawrence Ground, Canterbury; Umpires: TE Jesty and RA Kettleborough |
| Scorecard | 196 (51.1 overs); GL Brophy 51 (62); Yasir Arafat 4/38 (9.1 overs) | | 142/7 (38.3 overs); M van Jaarsveld 41 (52); Naved-ul-Hasan 3/24 (4.3 overs) | St Lawrence Ground, Canterbury; Umpires: TE Jesty and RA Kettleborough |
Yorkshire won the toss and elected to bat; Points: Yorkshire 8, Kent 22

| 16–19 July | Somerset (H) | v | Kent | Somerset won by 246 runs |
| Scorecard | 427 (88.5 overs); Z de Bruyn 81 (128); MJ Saggers 3/84 (18 overs) | | 208 (57.5 overs); R McLaren 34 (34); CM Willoughby 3/30 (14 overs) | County Ground, Taunton; Umpires: SA Garratt and P Willey |
| Scorecard | 243/8d (73 overs); JL Langer 88 (130); R McLaren 3/57 (20 overs) | | 216 (67.5 overs); GO Jones 53* (118); PS Jones 5/53 (16.5 overs) | County Ground, Taunton; Umpires: SA Garratt and P Willey |
Kent won the toss and elected to field; Points: Somerset 22, Kent 4

| 30 July – 2 August | Hampshire | v | (H) Kent | Match drawn |
| Scorecard | 367 (110.2 overs); MA Carberry 92 (179); Yasir Arafat 6/86 (27.2 overs) | | 369 (104.5 overs); JL Denly 89 (160); Imran Tahir 5/96 (30.5 overs) | St Lawrence Ground, Canterbury; Umpires: AA Jones and NJ Llong |
| Scorecard | 311/7d (93 overs); N Pothas 105* (219); Azhar Mahmood 3/38 (17 overs) | | | St Lawrence Ground, Canterbury; Umpires: AA Jones and NJ Llong |
Hampshire won the toss and elected to bat; Points: Kent 11, Hampshire 11

| 6–8 August | Durham (H) | v | Kent | Durham won by 43 runs |
| Scorecard | 146 (57.3 overs); MJ Di Venuto 27 (47); MJ Saggers 4/26 (14.3 overs) | | 78 (39.5 overs); JL Denly 21 (44); M Davies 5/21 (14 overs) | Riverside Ground, Chester-le-Street; Umpires: JW Holder and RT Robinson |
| Scorecard | 108 (41.2 overs); WR Smith 28 (66); RH Joseph 6/32 (14 overs) | | 133 (33.2 overs); M van Jaarsveld 53 (65); M Davies 5/24 (11 overs) | Riverside Ground, Chester-le-Street; Umpires: JW Holder and RT Robinson |
Kent won the toss and elected to field; Points: Durham 17, Kent 3

| 20–23 August | Kent (H) | v | Lancashire | Kent won by 211 runs |
| Scorecard | 283 (110.1 overs); GO Jones 106 (197); DG Cork 3/43 (23 overs) | | 125 (36.5 overs); G Chapple 44* (40); RH Joseph 5/34 (14 overs) | St Lawrence Ground, Canterbury; Umpires: B Dudleston and MJ Harris |
| Scorecard | 317/4d (86 overs); M van Jaarsveld 118 (217); SJ Croft 2/80 (15 overs) | | 264 (80.2 overs); MJ Chilton 102 (229); M van Jaarsveld 3/18 (6 overs) | St Lawrence Ground, Canterbury; Umpires: B Dudleston and MJ Harris |
Kent won the toss and elected to bat; Points: Kent 19, Lancashire 3

| 27–30 August | Kent | v | (H) Yorkshire | Match drawn |
| Scorecard | 227 (63.1 overs); M van Jaarsveld 107 (139); D Gough 2/34 (13 overs) | | 457 (143 overs); JA Rudolph 146 (221); A Khan 3/79 (26 overs) | North Marine Road Ground, Scarborough; Umpires: JH Evans and RT Robinson |
| Scorecard | 433 (122.2 overs); NJ Dexter 105 (224); Naved-ul-Hasan 4/86 (21.2 overs) | | 175/9 (51 overs); A Lyth 52 (84); A Khan 3/79 (26 overs) 3/32 (12 overs) | North Marine Road Ground, Scarborough; Umpires: JH Evans and RT Robinson |
Yorkshire won the toss and elected to field; Points: Yorkshire 12, Kent 7

| 4–7 September | Surrey | v | (H) Kent | Match drawn |
| Scorecard | 307/9d (106.4 overs); MR Ramprakash 127 (176); Yasir Arafat 3/66 (20 overs) | | 160/1 (21.2 overs); JL Denly 80 (60 overs); AJ Tudor 1/42 (5 overs) | St Lawrence Ground, Canterbury; Umpires: GI Burgess and P Willey |
Kent won the toss and elected to field; No play on day 1, only 2.1 overs on day 2, and overs also lost on days 3 and 4 due to rain; Points: Kent 7, Surrey 7

| 17–19 September | Lancashire (H) | v | Kent | Lancashire won by 70 runs |
| Scorecard | 107 (39 overs); SJ Croft 30 (65); A Khan 3/10 (9 overs) | | 233 (58 overs); GO Jones 91 (88); OJ Newby 4/79 (19 overs) | Aigburth, Liverpool; Umpires: JH Evans and JW Holder |
| Scorecard | 288 (81.5 overs); SG Law 79 (127); Yasir Arafat 4/41 (14.5 overs) | | 92 (38 overs); R McLaren 27 (65); G Chapple 6/40 (19 overs) | Aigburth, Liverpool; Umpires: JH Evans and JW Holder |
Kent won the toss and elected to field; Points: Lancashire 17, Kent 4

| 24–27 September | Kent (H) | v | Durham | Durham won by an innings and 70 runs |
| Scorecard | 225 (59.5 overs); RWT Key 58 (100); SJ Harmison 4/89 (21 overs) | | 500/8d (136 overs); GR Breese 121* (215); R McLaren 2/73 (18 overs) | St Lawrence Ground, Canterbury; Umpires: NL Bainton and G Sharp |
| Scorecard | 204 (60.3 overs); R McLaren 65* (115); CD Thorp 7/88 (23 overs) | | | St Lawrence Ground, Canterbury; Umpires: NL Bainton and G Sharp |
Durham won the toss and elected to field; Points: Kent 3, Durham 22

== Other first-class match ==
=== Tour match ===
| 28–30 April | Kent (H) | v | New Zealanders | Match drawn |
| Scorecard | 324/1d RWT Key 178* (260); TG Southee 1/49 (15 overs) | | 92/1 (38.2 overs); JM How 53* (106); R McLaren 1/29 (10.2 overs) | St Lawrence Ground, Canterbury; Umpires: NGC Cowley and A Hicks |
Kent won the toss and elected to bat; No play on day 3 due to rain; AJ Blake made his first class debut

== Friends Provident Trophy ==
=== South-East Division ===
| Team | Pld | W | T | L | NR | Pts | NRR |
|---|---|---|---|---|---|---|---|
| Kent Spitfires | 8 | 5 | 0 | 2 | 1 | 11 | +0.647 |
| Essex Eagles | 8 | 4 | 0 | 3 | 1 | 9 | +0.310 |
| Middlesex Crusaders | 8 | 3 | 0 | 3 | 2 | 8 | +0.064 |
| Surrey Brown Caps | 8 | 3 | 0 | 4 | 1 | 7 | −0.627 |
| Sussex Sharks | 8 | 1 | 0 | 4 | 3 | 5 | −0.534 |

=== Matches ===
| 20 April | Essex; 317/5 (50 overs) | v | (H) Kent; 286/9 (50 overs) | Essex won by 31 runs |
| Scorecard | Essex; 317/5 (50 overs) | v | (H) Kent; 286/9 (50 overs) | St Lawrence Ground, Canterbury; Umpires: TE Jesty and NJ Llong |
| Scorecard | ML Pettini 119 (141); Yasir Arafat 2/39 (9 overs) | | M van Jaarsveld 124 (93); JD Middlebrook 2/38 (7 overs) | St Lawrence Ground, Canterbury; Umpires: TE Jesty and NJ Llong |
| Kent won the toss and elected to field; Points: Kent 0, Essex 2 | | | | St Lawrence Ground, Canterbury; Umpires: TE Jesty and NJ Llong |

| 27 April | Middlesex (H); 177/8 (36.5 overs) | v | Kent; 166 (33 overs) | Middlesex won by 6 runs (D/L method) |
| Scorecard | Middlesex (H); 177/8 (36.5 overs) | v | Kent; 166 (33 overs) | Lord's, St John's Wood, London; Umpires: SA Garratt and NJ Llong |
| Scorecard | BA Godleman 43 (69); Yasir Arafat 2/26 (7 overs) | | M van Jaarsveld 53 (68); TJ Murtagh 4/29 (7 overs) | Lord's, St John's Wood, London; Umpires: SA Garratt and NJ Llong |
| Middlesex won the toss and elected to bat; Rain stopped the Middlesex innings after 36.5 overs and Kent's D/L target 173 runs to win from 33 overs; Points: Middlesex 2, Kent 0 | | | | Lord's, St John's Wood, London; Umpires: SA Garratt and NJ Llong |

| 4 May | Sussex (H); 245/6 (50 overs) | v | Kent; 249/6 (49.5 overs) | Kent won by 4 wickets (with 1 ball remaining) |
| Scorecard | Sussex (H); 245/6 (50 overs) | v | Kent; 249/6 (49.5 overs) | County Ground, Hove; Umpires: RA Kettleborough and NA Mallender |
| Scorecard | MH Yardy 50 (78); Yasir Arafat 3/58 (9 overs) | | JM Kemp 68* (79); LJ Wright 3/65 (10 overs) | County Ground, Hove; Umpires: RA Kettleborough and NA Mallender |
| Kent won the toss and elected to field; Points: Sussex 0, Kent 2 | | | | County Ground, Hove; Umpires: RA Kettleborough and NA Mallender |

| 5 May | Kent; 282/7 (50 overs) | v | (H) Surrey; 192 (42.4 overs) | Kent won by 90 runs |
| Scorecard | Kent; 282/7 (50 overs) | v | (H) Surrey; 192 (42.4 overs) | The Oval, Kennington, London; Umpires: B Dudleston and NA Mallender; Player of the match: GO Jones |
| Scorecard | GO Jones 86 (88); PT Collins 4/46 (10 overs) | | JN Batty 63 (91); R McLaren 5/46 (10 overs) | The Oval, Kennington, London; Umpires: B Dudleston and NA Mallender; Player of the match: GO Jones |
| Kent won the toss and elected to bat; Points: Surrey 0, Kent 2 | | | | The Oval, Kennington, London; Umpires: B Dudleston and NA Mallender; Player of the match: GO Jones |

| 11 May | Sussex; 218/9 (50 overs) | v | (H) Kent; 219/1 (42.1 overs) | Kent won by 9 wickets (with 47 balls remaining) |
| Scorecard | Sussex; 218/9 (50 overs) | v | (H) Kent; 219/1 (42.1 overs) | St Lawrence Ground, Canterbury; Umpires: SA Garratt and MJ Harris |
| Scorecard | MH Yardy 54 (78); SJ Cook 3/41 (8 overs) | | M van Jaarsveld 109* (102); RSC Martin-Jenkins 138 (7 overs) | St Lawrence Ground, Canterbury; Umpires: SA Garratt and MJ Harris |
| Sussex won the toss and elected to bat; Points: Kent 2, Sussex 0 | | | | St Lawrence Ground, Canterbury; Umpires: SA Garratt and MJ Harris |

| 16 May | Kent; 230/7 (50 overs) | v | (H) Essex; 124 (25.5 overs) | Kent won by 106 runs |
| Scorecard | Kent; 230/7 (50 overs) | v | (H) Essex; 124 (25.5 overs) | County Ground, Chelmsford; Umpires: AA Jones and JF Steele |
| Scorecard | JM Kemp 51 (86); GR Napier 3/29 (9 overs) | | JER Gallian 24 (20); Yasir Arafat 4/29 (8 overs) | County Ground, Chelmsford; Umpires: AA Jones and JF Steele |
| Kent won the toss and elected to bat; Points: Essex 0, Kent 2 | | | | County Ground, Chelmsford; Umpires: AA Jones and JF Steele |

| 18 May | Kent (H); 337/3 (50 overs) | v | Surrey; 320 (49.4 overs) | Kent won by 17 runs |
| Scorecard | Kent (H); 337/3 (50 overs) | v | Surrey; 320 (49.4 overs) | St Lawrence Ground, Canterbury; Umpires: IJ Gould and AA Jones |
| Scorecard | DI Stevens 119* (77); CJ Jordan 3/53 (10 overs) | | MA Butcher 139 (121); Azhar Mahmood 4/40 (9.4 overs) | St Lawrence Ground, Canterbury; Umpires: IJ Gould and AA Jones |
| Surrey won the toss and elected to field; Points: Kent 2, Surrey 0 M van Jaarsveld and DI Stevens set a Kent List A record for the 4th wicket, scoring an unbeaten 216 runs | | | | St Lawrence Ground, Canterbury; Umpires: IJ Gould and AA Jones |

| 26 May | Kent (H) | v | Middlesex | No result (match abandoned without a toss) |
| Scorecard | Kent (H) | v | Middlesex | Nevill Ground, Tunbridge Wells; Umpires: B Dudleston and JW Holder |
| No toss; Points: Kent 1, Middlesex 1 | | | | Nevill Ground, Tunbridge Wells; Umpires: B Dudleston and JW Holder |

=== Quarter-finals ===
| 4–5 June | Kent (H); 259/5 (50 overs) | v | Somerset; 222 (44.5 overs) | Kent won by 37 runs |
| Scorecard | Kent (H); 259/5 (50 overs) | v | Somerset; 222 (44.5 overs) | County Ground, Beckenham; Umpires: RK Illingworth and NA Mallender |
| Scorecard | NJ Dexter 101* (113); BJ Phillips 2/55 (10 overs) | | C Kieswetter 90 (119); Yasir Arafat 3/23 (8 overs) | County Ground, Beckenham; Umpires: RK Illingworth and NA Mallender |
| Kent won the toss and elected to bat; Match moved to reserve day due to heavy rain The match was originally scheduled to be played at Canterbury, but was moved to Beckenham on the reserve day due to wet conditions at the St Lawrence Ground | | | | County Ground, Beckenham; Umpires: RK Illingworth and NA Mallender |

=== Semi-finals ===
| 4 July | Kent; 301/4 (50 overs) | v | (H) Durham; 218 (43.1 overs) | Kent won by 83 runs |
| Scorecard | Kent; 301/4 (50 overs) | v | (H) Durham; 218 (43.1 overs) | Riverside, Chester-le-Street; Umpires: RA Kettleborough and NA Mallender; Player of the match: M van Jaarsveld (Kent) |
| Scorecard | M van Jaarsveld 122* (93); SJ Harmison 4/47 (10 overs) | | DM Benkenstein 80* (89); JC Tredwell 3/37 (10 overs) | Riverside, Chester-le-Street; Umpires: RA Kettleborough and NA Mallender; Player of the match: M van Jaarsveld (Kent) |
| Durham won the toss and elected to field | | | | Riverside, Chester-le-Street; Umpires: RA Kettleborough and NA Mallender; Player of the match: M van Jaarsveld (Kent) |

=== Final ===
| 16 August | Kent; 214 (50 overs) | v | Essex; 218/5 (48.5 overs) | Essex won by 5 wickets (with 7 balls remaining) |
| Scorecard | Kent; 214 (50 overs) | v | Essex; 218/5 (48.5 overs) | Lord's, St John's Wood, London; Umpires: NJ Llong and G Sharp; Player of the match: GW Flower (Essex) |
| Scorecard | R McLaren 63 (71); DD Masters 2/34 (10 overs) | | GW Flower 70* (97); RH Joseph 3/40 (10 overs) | Lord's, St John's Wood, London; Umpires: NJ Llong and G Sharp; Player of the match: GW Flower (Essex) |
| Kent won the toss and elected to bat | | | | Lord's, St John's Wood, London; Umpires: NJ Llong and G Sharp; Player of the match: GW Flower (Essex) |

== NatWest Pro40 ==
=== Division Two ===
| Team | Pld | W | T | L | N/R | Pts | Net R/R |
|---|---|---|---|---|---|---|---|
| Essex Eagles | 8 | 6 | 1 | 0 | 1 | 14 | +1.479 |
| Yorkshire Carnegie | 8 | 5 | 1 | 1 | 1 | 12 | +0.250 |
| Glamorgan Dragons | 8 | 5 | 0 | 3 | 0 | 10 | +0.113 |
| Kent Spitfires | 8 | 4 | 0 | 2 | 2 | 10 | +1.629 |
| Surrey Brown Caps | 8 | 4 | 0 | 4 | 0 | 8 | −0.444 |
| Warwickshire Bears | 8 | 3 | 0 | 3 | 2 | 8 | −0.242 |
| Leicestershire Foxes | 8 | 1 | 1 | 4 | 2 | 5 | −0.463 |
| Derbyshire Phantoms | 8 | 1 | 1 | 6 | 0 | 3 | −0.892 |
| Northamptonshire Steelbacks | 8 | 0 | 0 | 6 | 2 | 2 | −0.993 |

=== Matches ===
| 20 July | Kent; 228/8 (40 overs) | v | (H) Warwickshire; 206/9 (40 overs) | Kent won by 22 runs |
| Scorecard | Kent; 228/8 (40 overs) | v | (H) Warwickshire; 206/9 (40 overs) | Edgbaston, Birmingham; Umpires: GI Burgess and NGB Cook |
| Scorecard | RWT Key 80 (83); DL Maddy 2/26 (6 overs) | | IJL Trott 91* (102); Azhar Mahmood 4/29 (8 overs) | Edgbaston, Birmingham; Umpires: GI Burgess and NGB Cook |
| Kent won the toss and elected to bat; Points: Warwickshire 0, Kent 2 | | | | Edgbaston, Birmingham; Umpires: GI Burgess and NGB Cook |

| 3 August | Kent (H); 202/9 (36 overs) | v | Glamorgan; 131/9 (30.2 overs) | Kent won by 59 runs (D/L method) |
| Scorecard | Kent (H); 202/9 (36 overs) | v | Glamorgan; 131/9 (30.2 overs) | St Lawrence Ground, Canterbury; Umpires: AA Jones and NJ Llong |
| Scorecard | Azhar Mahmood 68 (51); JAR Harris 4/48 (7 overs) | | BJ Wright 51 (69); Azhar Mahmood 3/14 (6 overs) | St Lawrence Ground, Canterbury; Umpires: AA Jones and NJ Llong |
| Glamorgan won the toss and elected to field; Rain stopped play after 5.5 overs of Kent's innings and the match was reduced to 36 overs per side. Further rain ended the match after 30.2 overs of Glamorgan's reply (the D/L victory target at this stage was 191); Points: Kent 2, Glamorgan 0 | | | | St Lawrence Ground, Canterbury; Umpires: AA Jones and NJ Llong |

| 12 August | Kent (H); 226/7 (40 overs) | v | Leicestershire; 23/2 (6 overs) | No result |
| Scorecard | Kent (H); 226/7 (40 overs) | v | Leicestershire; 23/2 (6 overs) | St Lawrence Ground, Canterbury; Umpires: IJ Gould and RK Illingworth |
| Scorecard | RWT Key 62 (93); D du Preez 3/65 (8 overs) | | J du Toit 12 (13); Azhar Mahmood 1/9 (3 overs) | St Lawrence Ground, Canterbury; Umpires: IJ Gould and RK Illingworth |
| Kent won the toss and elected to bat; Bad light stopped play before enough overs had been bowled for a D/L target to be set; Points: Kent 1, Leicestershire 1 | | | | St Lawrence Ground, Canterbury; Umpires: IJ Gould and RK Illingworth |

| 18 August | Derbyshire; 60 (22.4 overs) | v | (H) Kent; 63/1 (9.4 overs) | Kent won by 9 wickets (with 182 balls remaining) |
| Scorecard | Derbyshire; 60 (22.4 overs) | v | (H) Kent; 63/1 (9.4 overs) | St Lawrence Ground, Canterbury; Umpires: NL Bainton and RT Robinson |
| Scorecard | JL Clare 18 (26); RH Joseph 5/13 (8 overs) | | JL Denly 28* (32); R Clarke 1/17 (1.4 overs) | St Lawrence Ground, Canterbury; Umpires: NL Bainton and RT Robinson |
| Derbyshire won the toss and elected to bat; Points: Derbyshire 0, Kent 2 | | | | St Lawrence Ground, Canterbury; Umpires: NL Bainton and RT Robinson |

| 25 August | Kent; 189/4 (40 overs) | v | (H) Yorkshire; 190/3 (33.1 overs) | Yorkshire won by 7 wickets (with 41 balls remaining) |
| Scorecard | Kent; 189/4 (40 overs) | v | (H) Yorkshire; 190/3 (33.1 overs) | North Marine Road Ground, Scarborough; Umpires: MJD Bodenham and JH Evans |
| Scorecard | DI Stevens 60* (40); RM Pyrah 4/35 (8 overs) | | A McGrath 85* (80); R McLaren 2/16 (5 overs) | North Marine Road Ground, Scarborough; Umpires: MJD Bodenham and JH Evans |
| Yorkshire won the toss and elected to field; Points: Yorkshire 2, Kent 0 | | | | North Marine Road Ground, Scarborough; Umpires: MJD Bodenham and JH Evans |

| 31 August | Northamptonshire (H) | v | Kent | No result (match abandoned without a toss) |
| Scorecard | Northamptonshire (H) | v | Kent | County Ground, Northampton; Umpires: NL Bainton and NGC Cowley |
| No toss; Points: Northamptonshire 1, Kent 1 | | | | County Ground, Northampton; Umpires: NL Bainton and NGC Cowley |

| 2 September | Kent; 314/6 (40 overs) | v | (H) Surrey; 172 (31.4 overs) | Kent won by 142 runs |
| Scorecard | Kent; 314/6 (40 overs) | v | (H) Surrey; 172 (31.4 overs) | The Oval, Kennington, London; Umpires: B Leadbeater and G Sharp; Player of the match: JL Denly (Kent) |
| Scorecard | JL Denly 98 (97); JW Dernbach 3/60 (8 overs) | | MNW Spriegel 54 (55); JC Tredwell 4/32 (6.4 overs) | The Oval, Kennington, London; Umpires: B Leadbeater and G Sharp; Player of the match: JL Denly (Kent) |
| Kent won the toss and elected to bat; Points: Surrey 0, Kent 2 | | | | The Oval, Kennington, London; Umpires: B Leadbeater and G Sharp; Player of the match: JL Denly (Kent) |

| 13 September | Kent (H); 246/5 (40 overs) | v | Essex; 247/6 (39 overs) | Essex won by 4 wickets (with 6 balls remaining) |
| Scorecard | Kent (H); 246/5 (40 overs) | v | Essex; 247/6 (39 overs) | St Lawrence Ground, Canterbury; Umpires: IJ Gould and P Willey; Player of the match: GW Flower (Essex) |
| Scorecard | RWT Key 120* (117); R ten Doeschate 2/54 (5 overs) | | GW Flower 68* (42); DI Stevens 2/27 (4 overs) | St Lawrence Ground, Canterbury; Umpires: IJ Gould and P Willey; Player of the match: GW Flower (Essex) |
| Essex won the toss and elected to field; Points: Kent 0, Essex 2 | | | | St Lawrence Ground, Canterbury; Umpires: IJ Gould and P Willey; Player of the match: GW Flower (Essex) |

== Twenty20 Cup ==
=== South Division ===
| Pos | Team | Pld | W | L | T | NR | Pts | NRR |
|---|---|---|---|---|---|---|---|---|
| 1 | Middlesex Crusaders | 10 | 8 | 2 | 0 | 0 | 16 | +0.732 |
| 2 | Essex Eagles | 10 | 6 | 3 | 1 | 0 | 13 | +0.937 |
| 3 | Kent Spitfires | 10 | 6 | 4 | 0 | 0 | 12 | +0.640 |
| 4 | Hampshire Hawks | 10 | 5 | 4 | 1 | 0 | 11 | -0.505 |
| 5 | Sussex Sharks | 10 | 2 | 8 | 0 | 0 | 4 | -0.876 |
| 6 | Surrey Brown Caps | 10 | 2 | 8 | 0 | 0 | 4 | -0.905 |

=== Matches ===
| 11 June | Sussex; 137 (19.5 overs) | v | (H) Kent; 140/4 (19.5 overs) | Kent won by 6 wickets (with 1 ball remaining) |
| Scorecard | Sussex; 137 (19.5 overs) | v | (H) Kent; 140/4 (19.5 overs) | St Lawrence Ground, Canterbury; Umpires: NL Bainton and GI Burgess; Player of the match: Azhar Mahmood (Kent) |
| Scorecard | CJ Adams 57 (37); Yasir Arafat (cricketer, born 1982) 4/17 (3.5 overs) | | JL Denly 50 (57); DR Smith 2/33 (4 overs) | St Lawrence Ground, Canterbury; Umpires: NL Bainton and GI Burgess; Player of the match: Azhar Mahmood (Kent) |
| Kent won the toss and elected to field; Points: Kent 2, Sussex 0 | | | | St Lawrence Ground, Canterbury; Umpires: NL Bainton and GI Burgess; Player of the match: Azhar Mahmood (Kent) |

| 13 June | Kent; 181/5 (20 overs) | v | (H) Surrey; 168/7 (20 overs) | Kent won by 13 runs |
| Scorecard | Kent; 181/5 (20 overs) | v | (H) Surrey; 168/7 (20 overs) | The Oval, Kennington, London; Umpires: GI Burgess and P Willey; Player of the match: JL Denly (Kent) |
| Scorecard | JL Denly 52 (33); Abdul Razzaq 2/32 (4 overs) | | SA Newman 48 (31); R McLaren 3/28 (4 overs) | The Oval, Kennington, London; Umpires: GI Burgess and P Willey; Player of the match: JL Denly (Kent) |
| Surrey won the toss and elected to field; Points: Surrey 0, Kent 2 | | | | The Oval, Kennington, London; Umpires: GI Burgess and P Willey; Player of the match: JL Denly (Kent) |

| 14 June | Hampshire (H); 197/6 (20 overs) | v | Kent; 153/7 (20 overs) | Hampshire won by 44 runs |
| Scorecard | Hampshire (H); 197/6 (20 overs) | v | Kent; 153/7 (20 overs) | Rose Bowl, Southampton; Umpires: RJ Bailey and B Dudleston; Player of the match: MJ Lumb (Hampshire) |
| Scorecard | MA Carberry 57 (42); Yasir Arafat (cricketer, born 1982) 4/38 (4 overs) | | JL Denly 63 (51); GA Lamb 2/25 (4 overs) | Rose Bowl, Southampton; Umpires: RJ Bailey and B Dudleston; Player of the match: MJ Lumb (Hampshire) |
| Hampshire won the toss and elected to bat; Points: Hampshire 2, Kent 0 | | | | Rose Bowl, Southampton; Umpires: RJ Bailey and B Dudleston; Player of the match: MJ Lumb (Hampshire) |

| 16 June | Hampshire; 162/7 (20 overs) | v | (H) Kent; 166/6 (20 overs) | Kent won by 4 wickets (with 0 balls remaining) |
| Scorecard | Hampshire; 162/7 (20 overs) | v | (H) Kent; 166/6 (20 overs) | St Lawrence Ground, Canterbury; Umpires: NGB Cook and JH Evans; Player of the match: Azhar Mahmood |
| Scorecard | MA Carberry 51 (39); SJ Cook 2/21 (4 overs) | | JL Denly 50 (46); LA Dawson 1/14 (2 overs) | St Lawrence Ground, Canterbury; Umpires: NGB Cook and JH Evans; Player of the match: Azhar Mahmood |
| Hampshire won the toss and elected to bat; Points: Kent 2, Hampshire 0 | | | | St Lawrence Ground, Canterbury; Umpires: NGB Cook and JH Evans; Player of the match: Azhar Mahmood |

| 18 June | Essex (H); 147/5 (20 overs) | v | Kent; 146/8 (20 overs) | Essex won by 1 run |
| Scorecard | Essex (H); 147/5 (20 overs) | v | Kent; 146/8 (20 overs) | County Ground, Chelmsford; Umpires: NA Mallender and G Sharp; Player of the match: Danish Kaneria (Essex) |
| Scorecard | JER Gallian 44 (30); JC Tredwell 2/25 (4 overs) | | M van Jaarsveld 32 (27); GW Flower 3/21 (2 overs) | County Ground, Chelmsford; Umpires: NA Mallender and G Sharp; Player of the match: Danish Kaneria (Essex) |
| Kent won the toss and elected to field; Points: Essex 2, Kent 0 | | | | County Ground, Chelmsford; Umpires: NA Mallender and G Sharp; Player of the match: Danish Kaneria (Essex) |

| 20 June | Kent (H); 86/7 (8 overs) | v | Middlesex; 61/7 (8 overs) | Kent won by 25 runs |
| Scorecard | Kent (H); 86/7 (8 overs) | v | Middlesex; 61/7 (8 overs) | County Ground, Beckenham; Umpires: MJD Bodenham and MJ Harris; Player of the match: JM Kemp (Kent) |
| Scorecard | JM Kemp 28 (10); M Kartik 2/15 (2 overs) | | DJ Malan 25 (19); JC Trewell 3/9 (2 overs) | County Ground, Beckenham; Umpires: MJD Bodenham and MJ Harris; Player of the match: JM Kemp (Kent) |
| Kent won the toss and elected to bat; Match reduced to 8 overs per side due to rain; Points: Kent 2, Middlesex 0 | | | | County Ground, Beckenham; Umpires: MJD Bodenham and MJ Harris; Player of the match: JM Kemp (Kent) |

| 22 June | Kent (H); 204/5 (20 overs) | v | Essex; 123 (18.5 overs) | Kent won by 81 runs |
| Scorecard | Kent (H); 204/5 (20 overs) | v | Essex; 123 (18.5 overs) | County Ground, Beckenham; Umpires: RK Illingworth and B Leadbeater; Player of the match: JL Denly (Kent) |
| Scorecard | JL Denly 91 (57); Danish Kaneria 2/30 (4 overs) | | RN ten Doeschate 22 (15); JC Trewell 3/17 (4 overs) | County Ground, Beckenham; Umpires: RK Illingworth and B Leadbeater; Player of the match: JL Denly (Kent) |
| Essex won the toss and elected to field; Points: Kent 2, Essex 0 | | | | County Ground, Beckenham; Umpires: RK Illingworth and B Leadbeater; Player of the match: JL Denly (Kent) |

| 24 June | Middlesex (H); 171/7 (20 overs) | v | Kent; 165/8 (20 overs) | Middlesex won by 6 runs |
| Scorecard | Middlesex (H); 171/7 (20 overs) | v | Kent; 165/8 (20 overs) | Uxbridge Cricket Club Ground, Uxbridge; Umpires: B Leadbeater and JF Steele; Player of the match: T Henderson (Middlesex) |
| Scorecard | EJG Morgan 62 (43); Azhar Mahmood 3/27 (4 overs) | | RWT Key 49 (38); T Henderson 4/29 (4 overs) | Uxbridge Cricket Club Ground, Uxbridge; Umpires: B Leadbeater and JF Steele; Player of the match: T Henderson (Middlesex) |
| Middlesex won the toss and elected to bat; Points: Middlesex 2, Kent 0 | | | | Uxbridge Cricket Club Ground, Uxbridge; Umpires: B Leadbeater and JF Steele; Player of the match: T Henderson (Middlesex) |

| 25 June | Surrey; 166/7 (20 overs) | v | (H) Kent; 160/9 (20 overs) | Surrey won by 6 runs |
| Scorecard | Surrey; 166/7 (20 overs) | v | (H) Kent; 160/9 (20 overs) | St Lawrence Ground, Canterbury; Umpires: RT Robinson and JF Steele; Player of the match: Abdul Razzaq (Surrey) |
| Scorecard | SA Newman 38 (25); R McLaren 2/26 (4 overs) | | Azhar Mahmood 55 (31); Abdul Razzaq 4/17 (4 overs) | St Lawrence Ground, Canterbury; Umpires: RT Robinson and JF Steele; Player of the match: Abdul Razzaq (Surrey) |
| Surrey won the toss and elected to bat; Points: Kent 0, Surrey 2 | | | | St Lawrence Ground, Canterbury; Umpires: RT Robinson and JF Steele; Player of the match: Abdul Razzaq (Surrey) |

| 27 June | Kent; 162/9 (20 overs) | v | (H) Sussex; 112 (17 overs) | Kent won by 50 runs |
| Scorecard | Kent; 162/9 (20 overs) | v | (H) Sussex; 112 (17 overs) | County Ground, Hove; Umpires: VA Holder and G Sharp; Player of the match: Yasir Arafat (Kent) |
| Scorecard | Yasir Arafat 42 (23); CJ Liddle 4/28 (4 overs) | | RJ Hamilton-Brown 36 (32); Yasir Arafat 3/12 (2 overs) | County Ground, Hove; Umpires: VA Holder and G Sharp; Player of the match: Yasir Arafat (Kent) |
| Kent won the toss and elected to bat; Points: Sussex 0, Kent 2 RH Joseph made his Twenty20 debut | | | | County Ground, Hove; Umpires: VA Holder and G Sharp; Player of the match: Yasir Arafat (Kent) |

=== Quarter-finals ===
| 9–10 July | Kent; 175/6 (20 overs) | v | (H) Warwickshire; 133/8 (20 overs) | Kent won by 42 runs |
| Scorecard | Kent; 175/6 (20 overs) | v | (H) Warwickshire; 133/8 (20 overs) | Edgbaston, Birmingham; Umpires: RJ Bailey and JW Lloyds; Player of the match: DI Stevens (Kent) |
| Scorecard | DI Stevens 69 (32); DL Maddy 1/7 (0.3 overs) | | AG Botha 35 (19); Yasir Arafat 3/29 (4 overs) | Edgbaston, Birmingham; Umpires: RJ Bailey and JW Lloyds; Player of the match: DI Stevens (Kent) |
| Warwickshire won the toss and elected to field; Match moved to reserve day due to rain | | | | Edgbaston, Birmingham; Umpires: RJ Bailey and JW Lloyds; Player of the match: DI Stevens (Kent) |

=== Semi-finals ===
| 26 July | Kent; 173/8 (20 overs) | v | Essex; 159/8 (20 overs) | Kent won by 14 runs |
| Scorecard | Kent; 173/8 (20 overs) | v | Essex; 159/8 (20 overs) | Rose Bowl, Southampton; Umpires: RJ Bailey and JW Lloyds; Player of the match: Azhar Mahmood (Kent) |
| Scorecard | JL Denly 36 (27); RS Bopara 3/36 (3 overs) | | ML Pettini 54* (47); Yasir Arafat 2/22 (4 overs) | Rose Bowl, Southampton; Umpires: RJ Bailey and JW Lloyds; Player of the match: Azhar Mahmood (Kent) |
| Kent won the toss and elected to bat | | | | Rose Bowl, Southampton; Umpires: RJ Bailey and JW Lloyds; Player of the match: Azhar Mahmood (Kent) |

=== Final ===
| 26 July | Middlesex; 187/6 (20 overs) | v | Kent; 184/5 (20 overs) | Middlesex won by 3 runs |
| Scorecard | Middlesex; 187/6 (20 overs) | v | Kent; 184/5 (20 overs) | Rose Bowl, Southampton; Umpires: JW Lloyds and NA Mallender; Player of the match: OA Shah (Middlesex) |
| Scorecard | OA Shah 75 (35); Yasir Arafat 2/20 (4 overs) | | RWT Key 52 (30); SD Udal 1/21 (4 overs) | Rose Bowl, Southampton; Umpires: JW Lloyds and NA Mallender; Player of the match: OA Shah (Middlesex) |
| Middlesex won the toss and elected to bat | | | | Rose Bowl, Southampton; Umpires: JW Lloyds and NA Mallender; Player of the match: OA Shah (Middlesex) |

== UCCE match ==
Kent's 3-day match against Leeds/Bradford UCCE in April did not have first-class status.

| 12–14 April | Kent | v | Leeds/Bradford UCCE | Match drawn |
| Scorecard | 481/5d (101 overs); JL Denly 122 (149); JRC Campbell 1/16 (4 overs) | | 299/7 (94.1 overs); JR Moorhouse 94 (160); R McLaren 2/28 (17 overs) | St Lawrence Ground, Canterbury; Umpires: GI Burgess and DJ Millns |
Leeds/Bradford UCCE won the toss and elected to field; Match did not have first-class status
