= 2016 T20 Blast =

2016 NatWest t20 Blast
- Dates: 20 May 2016 – 20 August 2016
- Administrator: England and Wales Cricket Board
- Cricket format: Twenty20
- Tournament format(s): Group stage and knockout
- Champions: Northamptonshire (2nd title)
- Participants: 18
- Matches: 133
- Attendance: 815,000 (6,128 per match)
- Most runs: Michael Klinger (548)
- Most wickets: Benny Howell (24)
- Official website: NatWest T20 Blast

The 2016 NatWest T20 Blast was the fourteenth edition of the T20 Blast, the domestic T20 competition run by the ECB. The league consisted of the 18 first-class county teams divided into two divisions of nine teams each with fixtures played between May and August. The final took place at Edgbaston Cricket Ground in Birmingham on 20 August 2016.

== Competition format ==
18 teams competed for the T20 title. Teams were initially split into 2 divisions (North and South), each containing 9 teams, for the group stage of the competition. During the group stage (from May to July) each club plays 6 of the other teams in the same division twice, once at their home stadium and once at that of their opponents. They play the other two teams only once, for a total of 14 games each. Teams receive two points for a win and one point for a tie or if the match is abandoned. No points are awarded for a loss. Teams are ranked by total points, then net run rate. At the end of the group stage, the top four teams from each group enter the knockout stage.

== North Division ==
=== Table ===
Pos	Team	Pld	W	L	T	NR	Ded	Pts	NRR
1	Nottinghamshire Outlaws	14	8	2	0	4	0	20	0.741
2	Northamptonshire Steelbacks	14	7	5	0	2	0	16	0.265
3	Yorkshire Vikings	14	7	5	0	2	0	16	0.223
4	Durham Jets	14	6	6	0	2	0	14	−0.050
5	Lancashire Lightning	14	6	7	0	1	0	13	0.200
6	Birmingham Bears	14	6	7	0	1	0	13	−0.215
7	Derbyshire Falcons	14	5	7	0	2	0	12	0.021
8	Worcestershire Rapids	14	5	7	0	2	0	12	−0.862
9	Leicestershire Foxes	14	4	8	0	2	0	10	−0.180

=== Results ===
	Birmingham Bears	Derbyshire Falcons	Durham Jets	Lancashire Lightning	Leicestershire Foxes	Northamptonshire Steelbacks	Nottinghamshire Outlaws	Worcestershire Rapids	Yorkshire Vikings
Birmingham Bears			Birmingham Bears; 9 wickets	Birmingham Bears; 18 runs (D/L)		Northamptonshire Steelbacks; 8 wickets (D/L)	Nottinghamshire Outlaws; 6 wickets	Worcestershire Rapids; 5 wickets	Abandoned; No result
Derbyshire Falcons	Birmingham Bears; 4 wickets			Derbyshire Falcons; 6 wickets	Derbyshire Falcons; 4 wickets	Abandoned; No result	Nottinghamshire Outlaws; 7 wickets	Derbyshire Falcons; 29 runs	Yorkshire Vikings; 1 run
Durham Jets				Lancashire Lightning; 4 runs	Durham Jets; 5 wickets	Durham Jets; 6 wickets	Durham Jets; 66 runs	Abandoned; No result	Durham Jets; 6 runs (D/L)
Lancashire Lightning		Derbyshire Falcons; 9 wickets	Durham Jets; 6 wickets		Lancashire Lightning; 9 wickets (D/L)	Abandoned; No result		Lancashire Lightning; 96 runs	Lancashire Lightning; 26 runs
Leicestershire Foxes	Birmingham Bears; 8 wickets	Leicestershire Foxes; 9 wickets	Leicestershire Foxes; 6 wickets	Leicestershire Foxes; 9 runs		Northamptonshire Steelbacks; 5 wickets (D/L)	Abandoned; No result	Abandoned; No result	
Northamptonshire Steelbacks	Northamptonshire Steelbacks; 74 runs	Northamptonshire Steelbacks; 3 wickets	Northamptonshire Steelbacks; 26 runs		Northamptonshire Steelbacks; 6 wickets		Nottinghamshire Outlaws; 6 wickets	Northamptonshire Steelbacks; 7 wickets	Yorkshire Vikings; 14 runs
Nottinghamshire Outlaws	Birmingham Bears; 6 wickets	Abandoned; No result	Abandoned; No result	Nottinghamshire Outlaws; 2 wickets				Nottinghamshire Outlaws; 9 wickets	Yorkshire Vikings; 3 wickets
Worcestershire Rapids	Worcestershire Rapids; 5 wickets	Derbyshire Falcons; 7 wickets	Worcestershire Rapids; 38 runs	Lancashire Lightning; 7 wickets		Worcestershire Rapids; 3 wickets	Nottinghamshire Outlaws; 4 wickets		Worcestershire Rapids; 7 wickets
Yorkshire Vikings	Yorkshire Vikings; 2 runs	Yorkshire Vikings; 1 run (D/L)	Yorkshire Vikings; 20 runs	Yorkshire Vikings; 5 runs	Leicestershire Foxes; 54 runs	Yorkshire Vikings; 75 runs	Abandoned; No result		

Home team win	Away team win	Match tied	Match abandoned

== South Division ==
=== Table ===
Pos	Team	Pld	W	L	T	NR	Ded	Pts	NRR
1	Gloucestershire	14	10	3	0	1	0	21	0.518
2	Glamorgan	14	8	3	0	3	0	19	1.005
3	Middlesex	14	7	6	0	1	0	15	0.395
4	Essex Eagles	14	7	6	0	1	0	15	0.174
5	Surrey	14	7	7	0	0	0	14	0.153
6	Sussex Sharks	14	5	6	0	3	0	13	−0.053
7	Kent Spitfires	14	6	8	0	0	0	12	−0.643
8	Hampshire	14	4	8	0	2	0	10	−0.691
9	Somerset	14	3	10	0	1	0	7	−0.660

=== Results ===
	Essex Eagles	Glamorgan	Gloucestershire	Hampshire	Kent Spitfires	Middlesex	Somerset	Surrey	Sussex Sharks
Essex Eagles		Abandoned; No result	Gloucestershire; 8 wickets	Essex Eagles; 5 wickets	Essex Eagles; 50 runs	Middlesex; 17 runs		Surrey; 8 runs	Sussex Sharks; 24 runs
Glamorgan	Essex Eagles; 7 wickets		Gloucestershire; 9 wickets	Glamorgan; 5 wickets	Glamorgan; 55 runs (D/L)		Glamorgan; 7 wickets	Glamorgan; 9 wickets	Glamorgan; 46 runs
Gloucestershire	Gloucestershire; 30 runs	Glamorgan; 6 wickets			Kent Spitfires; 3 runs	Gloucestershire; 4 wickets	Gloucestershire; 4 wickets	Gloucestershire; 6 wickets	Sussex Sharks; 1 run (D/L)
Hampshire	Essex Eagles; 3 runs	Hampshire; 25 runs	Abandoned; No result		Hampshire; 9 runs	Middlesex; 43 runs	Hampshire; 83 runs		Abandoned; No result
Kent Spitfires	Essex Eagles; 33 runs		Gloucestershire; 7 wickets	Kent Spitfires; 8 runs		Middlesex; 40 runs	Kent Spitfires; 8 wickets	Kent Spitfires; 8 wickets	Kent Spitfires; 10 runs
Middlesex	Essex Eagles; 5 wickets	Glamorgan; 9 wickets	Gloucestershire; 4 wickets	Middlesex; 69 runs			Middlesex; 4 runs	Middlesex; 5 wickets	Abandoned; No result
Somerset	Somerset; 7 wickets	Abandoned; No result	Gloucestershire; 7 wickets	Somerset; 6 wickets	Kent Spitfires; 12 runs	Middlesex; 5 wickets		Somerset; 8 wickets	
Surrey	Essex Eagles; 8 wickets	Glamorgan; 8 wickets		Surrey; 80 runs	Surrey; 37 runs	Surrey; 29 runs	Surrey; 15 runs		Surrey; 6 wickets
Sussex Sharks		Abandoned; No result	Gloucestershire; 11 runs	Hampshire; 1 run	Sussex Sharks; 4 wickets	Sussex Sharks; 7 wickets	Sussex Sharks; 48 runs	Surrey; 23 runs	

Home team win	Away team win	Match tied	Match abandoned

== Knockout stage ==
Quarter-finals
Nottinghamshire	162/7
Essex	123
Northamptonshire	135/3
Middlesex	132/7
Glamorgan	90
Yorkshire	180/8
Gloucestershire	161
Durham	180/5

Semi-finals
Nottinghamshire	153/9
Northamptonshire	161/8
Durham	156/6
Yorkshire	149/9

Final
Northamptonshire	155/6
Durham	153/8

== Personnel ==
Team	Coach	Captain
Birmingham Bears	(Scotland) Dougie Brown	(England) Ian Bell
Derbyshire Falcons	(England) Graeme Welch	(England) Wes Durston
Durham Jets	(England) Jon Lewis	(England) Mark Stoneman
Essex Eagles	(England) Chris Silverwood	(England) Ravi Bopara
Glamorgan	(Wales) Robert Croft	(South Africa) Jacques Rudolph
Gloucestershire	(England) Richard Dawson	(Australia) Michael Klinger
Hampshire	(South Africa) Dale Benkenstein	(England) James Vince
Kent Spitfires	(Cricket West Indies) Jimmy Adams	(England) Sam Northeast
Lancashire Lightning	(England) Ashley Giles	(England) Steven Croft
Leicestershire Foxes	(Australia) Andrew McDonald	(England) Mark Pettini
Middlesex	(England) Richard Scott	(England) Dawid Malan
Northamptonshire Steelbacks	(England) David Ripley	(England) Alex Wakely
Nottinghamshire Outlaws	(England) Mick Newell	(Australia) Dan Christian
Somerset	(England) Matthew Maynard	(Australia) Jim Allenby
Surrey	(Australia) Michael Di Venuto	(England) Gareth Batty
Sussex Sharks	(South Africa) Mark Davis	(England) Luke Wright
Worcestershire Rapids	(England) Steve Rhodes	(England) Daryl Mitchell
Yorkshire Vikings	(Australia) Jason Gillespie	(England) Alex Lees
