= Clacton County High School =

Location
- Walton Road; Clacton-on-Sea, Essex, CO15 6DZ; England; 51°47′58″N 1°08′31″E

Information
- Type: Academy
- Motto: Higher Expectations, Raising Aspirations, Transforming Lives
- Established: 1928
- Department for Education URN: 138084 Tables
- Ofsted: Reports
- Executive Headteacher: Neil Gallagher
- Head of School: Chris Taylor
- Gender: Co-educational
- Age: 11 to 19
- Enrolment: 1900
- Capacity: 2320
- Website: https://www.countyhigh.org.uk/

Clacton County High School is a co-educational secondary school and sixth form with academy status, located in Clacton-on-Sea, in the county of Essex, England.

There are over 1,900 students attending the school. It operates across two sites; 11-16 at Walton Road and the sixth form, ‘Sigma Sixth’, based at the Tendring Education Centre on Jaywick Lane. The sixth form is working in partnership with other local schools to provide post-16 years education in the Clacton area.

== History ==
The school was opened as a grammar school in September 1928. The official opening was on 28 November 1928 by Robert Strutt, 4th Baron Rayleigh (son of the Nobel Prize–winning physicist John Strutt, 3rd Baron Rayleigh). Pupils had to pay for the privilege of attending this school, twelve guineas per year (£12.60), as well as buy all their own books, materials and instruments. During the Second World War, a German bomber with sea mines crashed near the school on Victoria Road in April 1940. The crew and two civilians were killed.

It became a comprehensive school in 1973. In 1998, it became an arts college. It converted to academy status on 1 April 2012. On the 1 September 2016, the school formed the Sigma Trust along with five other schools in the locality.

In 2023 the school was found to have potentially structurally unsound buildings due to the use of reinforced autoclaved aerated concrete as a building material.

=== Notable former students ===
- Michael Comber, Essex cricket
- Tom Eastman, footballer
- Ian Westlake, footballer
- Sade, Helen Folasade Adu CBE, singer
- Barry Douglas Lamb, experimental musician
