= 2008 Friends Provident Trophy =

- Administrator: England and Wales Cricket Board
- Cricket format: Limited overs cricket (50 overs)
- Tournament format(s): Group stage and Knockout
- Champions: Essex (3rd title)
- Participants: 20
- Matches: 69 (+18 results)
- Most runs: Martin van Jaarsveld (660 for Kent)
- Most wickets: Yasir Arafat (24 for Kent)
- Official website: Friends Provident cricket

The 2008 Friends Provident Trophy was an English county cricket tournament, held between 20 April and 16 August 2008. The tournament was won by Essex.

== Format ==
Unlike in 2007, the 18 English counties, Ireland and Scotland were divided into four groups of five, based on geographical location. Each team played the other four teams home and away, with the top two teams from each group progressing to the quarter-final stage. A spokesman for the England and Wales Cricket Board, which instigated the changes, explained that the changes "provides [sic] more local derbies and less travel for players". The recommendations of the Schofield Report; an investigation into England's 5–0 Ashes defeat, were also cited as a cause for the changes.

== Group stage ==
=== Midlands Division ===
Team	Pld	W	T	L	NR	Pts	NRR
Leicestershire Foxes	8	5	0	2	1	11	+0.692
Nottinghamshire Outlaws	8	4	0	2	2	10	+0.017
Northamptonshire Steelbacks	8	4	0	2	2	10	+0.569
Warwickshire Bears	8	2	0	4	2	6	-0.145
Ireland	8	1	0	6	1	3	-0.862

=== North Division ===
Team	Pld	W	T	L	NR	Pts	NRR
Durham Dynamos	8	5	0	3	0	10	+0.432
Yorkshire Carnegie	8	4	0	2	2	10	+0.544
Derbyshire Phantoms	8	3	0	2	3	9	-0.141
Lancashire Lightning	8	3	0	3	2	8	+0.243
Scottish Saltires	8	1	0	6	1	3	-1.090

=== South East Division ===
Team	Pld	W	T	L	NR	Pts	NRR
Kent Spitfires	8	5	0	2	1	11	+0.647
Essex Eagles	8	4	0	3	1	9	+0.310
Middlesex Crusaders	8	3	0	3	2	8	+0.064
Surrey Brown Caps	8	3	0	4	1	7	-0.627
Sussex Sharks	8	1	0	4	3	5	-0.534

=== South/West Division ===
Team	Pld	W	T	L	NR	Pts	NRR
Gloucestershire Gladiators	8	4	0	1	3	11	+0.705
Somerset Sabres	8	3	0	2	3	9	+0.307
Worcestershire Royals	8	3	0	3	2	8	-0.121
Hampshire Hawks	8	3	0	4	1	7	-0.431
Glamorgan Dragons	8	1	0	4	3	5	-0.219

== Knockout stage ==
=== Quarter finals ===
4 June 2008

Nottinghamshire Outlaws; 188 all out (47.2 overs)	v	Durham Dynamos; 189 for 9 (49 overs)
Samit Patel 114 (113); Callum Thorp 2/20 (9)		Michael Di Venuto 70 (86); Samit Patel 3/27 (10)

Durham Dynamos won by 1 wicket
Riverside Ground, Chester-le-Street
Umpires: George Sharp and John Steele
Player of the match: Samit Patel (Nottinghamshire)

4 June 2008

Gloucestershire Gladiators; 201 all out (45.2 overs)	v	Yorkshire Carnegie; 205 for 4 (44.1 overs)
Steve Adshead 71 (73); Tim Bresnan 4/31 (10)		Craig White 55 (107); Jon Lewis 2/21 (10)

Yorkshire Carnegie won by 6 wickets
County Ground, Bristol
Umpires: Barry Dudleston and Nigel Llong
Player of the match: Tim Bresnan (Yorkshire)

4 June 2008

Essex Eagles; 350 for 5 (50 overs)	v	Leicestershire Foxes; 232 all out (41 overs)
Ravi Bopara 201* (138); Dillon du Preez 2/60 (10)		Paul Nixon 62 (64); Ryan ten Doeschate 2/32 (7)

Essex Eagles won by 118 runs
Grace Road, Leicester
Umpires: Rob Bailey and Ian Gould
Player of the match: Ravi Bopara (Essex)

4–5 June 2008

Kent Spitfires; 259 for 5 (50 overs)	v	Somerset Sabres; 222 all out (45.5 overs)
Neil Dexter 101* (113); Ben Phillips 2/55 (10)		Craig Kieswetter 90 (119); Yasir Arafat 3/23 (8)

Kent Spitfires won by 37 runs
County Ground, Beckenham
Umpires: Richard Illingworth and Neil Mallender
Player of the match: Neil Dexter (Kent)

- Reserve day used

=== Semi finals ===
4 July 2008

Kent Spitfires; 301 for 4 (50 overs)	v	Durham Dynamos; 217 all out (43.1 overs)
Martin van Jaarsveld 122* (93) Joe Denly 102 (125); Steve Harmison 4/47 (10)		Dale Benkenstein 79* (89); James Tredwell 3/37 (10)

Kent Spitfires won by 84 runs
Riverside Ground, Chester-le-Street
Umpires: Richard Kettleborough and Neil Mallender
Player of the match: Martin van Jaarsveld (Kent)

5 July 2008

Essex Eagles; 285 for 8 (50 overs)	v	Yorkshire Carnegie; 198 all out (42.5 overs)
Alistair Cook 95 (127); Rana Naved-ul-Hasan 2/41 (10)		Andrew Gale 64 (84); Ryan ten Doeschate 3/30 (7)

Essex Eagles won by 87 runs
County Ground, Chelmsford
Umpires: Peter Hartley and Nigel Llong
Player of the match: Graham Napier (Essex)

=== Final ===
16 August 2008

Kent Spitfires; 214 all out (50 overs)	v	Essex Eagles; 215 for 5 (48.5 overs)
Ryan McLaren 63 (71); David Masters 2/34 (10)		Grant Flower 70* (97); Robbie Joseph 3/40 (10)

Essex Eagles won by 5 wickets
Lord's Cricket Ground, London
Umpires: Nigel Llong and George Sharp
Player of the match: Grant Flower (Essex)
