= Glen Chapple =

English cricketer

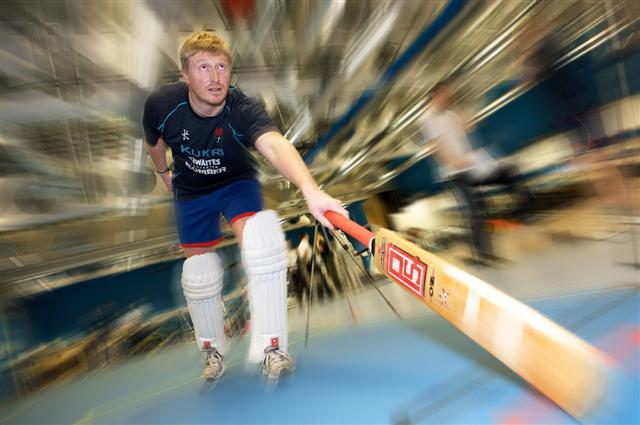

Personal information
- Born: 23 January 1974 (age 52); Skipton, Yorkshire, England
- Nickname: Chappy, Boris
- Height: 6 ft 2 in (1.88 m)
- Batting: Right-handed
- Bowling: Right-arm medium-fast
- Role: All-rounder

International information
- National side: England (2006)
- Only ODI (cap 191): 13 June 2006 v Ireland

Domestic team information
- Years: Team
- 1992–2017: Lancashire (squad no. 3)

Career statistics
Competition	ODI	FC	LA	T20
Matches	1	315	283	66
Runs scored	14	8,725	2,062	301
Batting average	14.00	24.16	17.77	13.08
100s/50s	0/0	6/37	0/9	0/1
Top score	14	155	81*	55*
Balls bowled	24	54,449	12,165	1,300
Wickets	0	985	320	68
Bowling average	–	26.71	28.55	23.32
5 wickets in innings	–	39	5	0
10 wickets in match	–	3	0	0
Best bowling	–	7/53	6/18	3/36
Catches/stumpings	0/–	104/–	66/–	16/–
- Source: Cricinfo, 7 April 2016

Glen Chapple (born 23 January 1974) is an English cricket coach and former cricketer. He is an all-rounder, and represented the national team in a One Day International, as well as performing well for Lancashire over many years. He bowled right-arm fast-medium, and is a right-handed batsman. With six first-class centuries to his name, Chapple shares with Mark Pettini the record for fastest first-class century, scored against declaration bowling by Glamorgan in 1993, coming off just 27 balls.

Chapple played a single One Day International for England, against Ireland in 2006 but bowled only 4 wicket less overs. After Stuart Law left the club, Chapple was appointed as Lancashire's captain from the 2009 season onwards and led the county to victory in the 2011 County Championship. That year he became the fifth player to score 7,000 runs and take 700 wickets for Lancashire. In 2012 he was named as one of Wisden's five Cricketers of the Year.

Between 2017 and 2023, Chapple was the head coach of Lancashire.

== Playing career ==
Chapple's most notable achievements include winning the Gold Award for his 6/18 in the 1996 Natwest Trophy final against Essex at Lord's. He shares with Mark Pettini the record for fastest ever first-class century; he scored it against Glamorgan at Old Trafford in 1993 from just 27 balls and 21 minutes, although this was against the bowling of Matthew Maynard and Tony Cottey in an attempt to set up a declaration.

Chapple was tipped for a long time for full international honours. After a successful England A tour of India and Bangladesh in 1994–5, in which Chapple topped the first-class bowling averages, Simon Hughes wrote that Chapple "should appear for England this summer". But while a number of other players on the tour, such as Mark Ramprakash, Dominic Cork and Michael Vaughan, went on to experience extensive England careers, Chapple would have to wait eleven years for a single one-day international cap, Lancashire team-mate Peter Martin being preferred to Chapple that summer.

Chapple was named Lancashire's Player of the Year for the 2002 Season. In August 2003, Chapple was one of three uncapped players – along with spin bowler Gareth Batty and batsman Ed Smith – to be selected in the England's 13-man squad from which the final team to face South Africa in the third Test at Trent Bridge would be chosen. According to Geoff Miller, one of the selectors, said the selectors had "picked Gareth Batty and Glen Chapple as extra spin and quick bowling options, both of whom have performed well this season for their respective counties". When he was chosen for the squad, Chapple had taken 27 wickets and averaged 45.18 with the bat for the season. Chapple was not selected for the final eleven.

He was awarded a benefit season by Lancashire in 2004.

After Chapple helped Lancashire win the County Championship Division Two title in 2005, taking 47 wickets at an average of 21.48, he made an impressive start to the 2006 season which saw him take 23 wickets with an average of 21.56 with the ball and 43 with the bat in the opening six Championship matches. Due to his form, Chapple made his international debut on 13 June 2006 against Ireland at Belfast. After bowling four wicketless overs against Ireland, Chapple had to pull out of the squad to face Sri Lanka with an abdominal injury, and has not played for England since. In 2006, he became only the tenth player to achieve the 5,000 run and 500 wicket first-class double for Lancashire.

Chapple has also represented England in the Hong Kong Sixes. He played in the England team that won the tournament in 2003 and again in 2004. In 2006, Chapple played in the Sixes team alongside two other Lancashire players, captain Dominic Cork and batsman Mal Loye.

On 31 May 2013, in the game against Gloucestershire at Aigburth, Glen Chapple took his 900th wicket when had Michael Klinger caught by Andrea Agathangelou at second slip. Only Johnny Briggs and Jack Simmons have now scored more runs and taken more wickets for Lancashire than Chapple. James Anderson, who recently claimed his 300th Test wicket against New Zealand Tweeted this tribute, 'Huge congratulations to Glen Chapple on taking his 900th first-class wicket! I've not played with anyone who works harder.'

== Captaincy ==
When Stuart Law was released by Lancashire in October 2008, after the season had ended, Chapple replaced him as captain. Speaking of his appointment, Chapple said "it's a privilege to play for such a big county, and an even bigger honour to be captaining the club I've been involved with for the past 18 years. I'm a product of the Lancashire system, and I look forward to leading a very talented squad of players to future success". Despite missing five County Championship matches of the 2009 season through injury, Chapple was named Lancashire's Championship Player of the Year.

You can't really praise him enough. It's not that he takes wickets but he also creates pressure for other people because he goes at under three an over. He's bowled beautifully this year and he's also got the pressure of captaincy so he's great to have in the side. He's worked very hard physically as well to make sure he's kept himself fit and strong to do a role of strike bowler in the side, so all credit to him: he's done a great job. ... He hasn't lost pace, he's got great control, and he moves the ball all the time.

— Lancashire coach Peter Moores, 21 August 2010

Before the start of the 2010 season, Chapple declared his intention to play in every one of Lancashire's matches. However, as he had suffered injuries over the previous three years, coach Peter Moores decided not to pick Chapple for most of Lancashire's 40-over matches and some T20s to maintain his fitness for the County Championship. Although Chapple was injured in July and missed a couple of T20 matches, he recovered quickly enough that he did not miss a fixture of the County Championship.

At the start of 2011, Lancashire were widely tipped to face relegation from the first division of the County Championship. Against Yorkshire in May, Chapple became the fifth Lancashire player to score 7,000 runs and take 700 wickets for the club. Chapple passed the landmark of 800 first-class wickets in May 2011 during a match against Warwickshire. His 800th wicket was that of batsman William Porterfield. Victory in the match sent Lancashire to the top of the County Championship. In the last match of the season, Lancashire won the County Championship for the first time since 1950 when they shared the title. In his fifth over of the match Chapple experienced pain in his right hamstring, and feared he may have torn it. He returned to the field with strapping and on the final day, when he claimed his 800th wicket for Lancashire, he produced what Michael Atherton considered to be his most threatening bowling in a decade. For his efforts in taking Lancashire to the title, Chapple was named as one of Wisden five Cricketers of the Year in 2012. He said "Personally I had a good season but that wouldn't, in itself, be enough normally to win this award. The credit has to go to the players for the way they performed last year. It was a fantastic year for Lancashire and all the lads who played so well have obviously played a big part in me receiving this award."

Lancashire's title defence began with three defeats and two draws in their first five matches of the 2012 County Championship. In a match against Warwickshire in April Chapple jarred his ankle in the field and was on pain killers, and in the return fixture left the field with an injury but returned to the squad for the next County Championship match.

== Coaching career ==
In 2014, Chapple was appointed as a bowling coach at Lancashire, while continuing to play. After Ashley Giles left to rejoin Warwickshire, Chapple was appointed as Lancashire's head coach on 17 January 2017. In Chapple's first season as head coach, Lancashire finished second in the County Championship, although a season of struggle followed in 2018 and Lancashire were relegated to Division Two. However, they went unbeaten in the following season and earned an immediate return to Division One. Chapple left Lancashire in 2023 after 31 years at the club.
