= James Foster (cricketer, born 1980) =

English cricketer and cricket coach

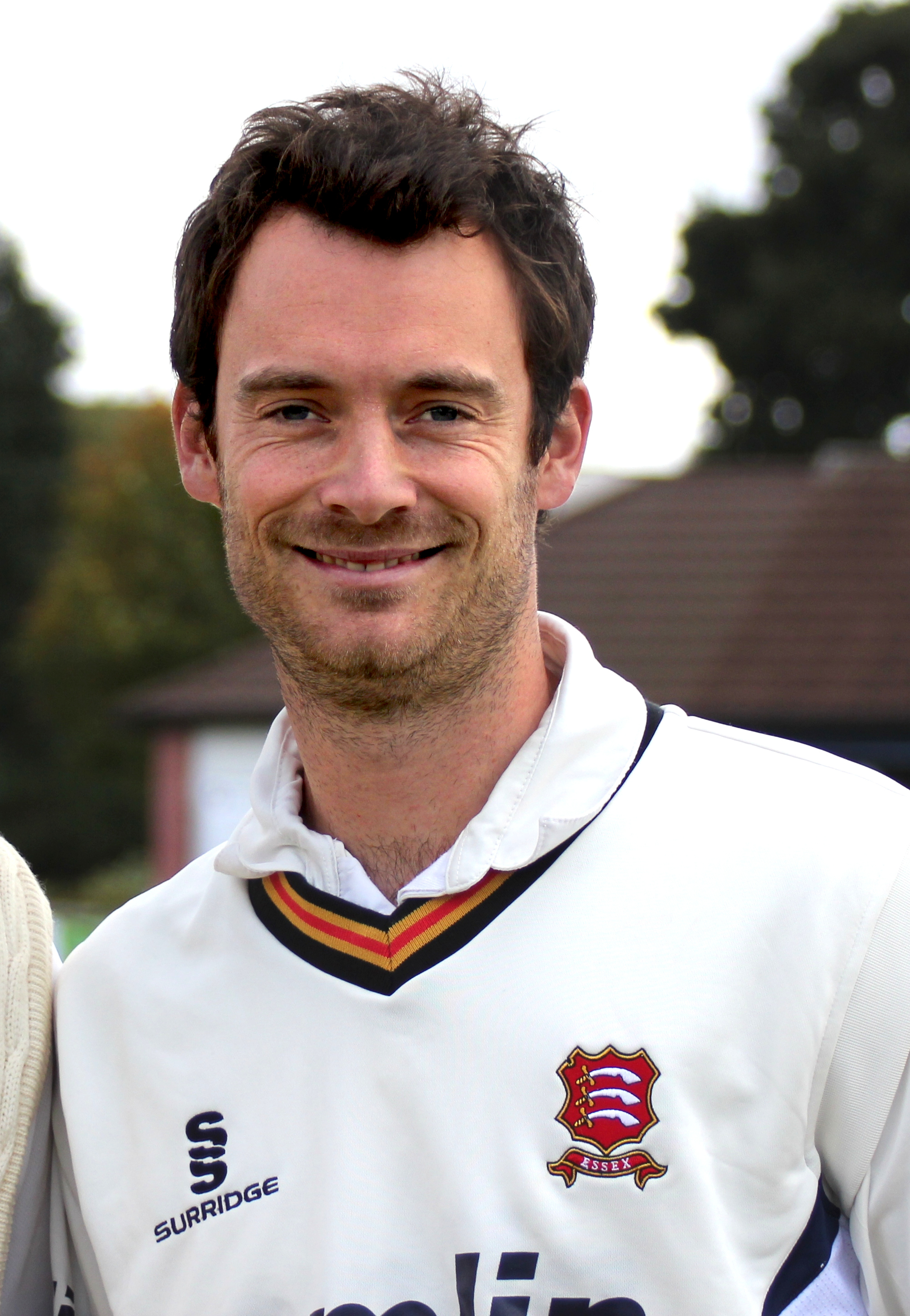

Personal information
- Full name: James Savin Foster
- Born: 15 April 1980 (age 46); Leytonstone, London, England
- Height: 6 ft 0 in (1.83 m)
- Batting: Right-handed
- Role: Wicket-keeper

International information
- National side: England (2001–2002)
- Test debut (cap 609): 3 December 2001 v India
- Last Test: 26 December 2002 v Australia
- ODI debut (cap 164): 3 October 2001 v Zimbabwe
- Last ODI: 13 February 2002 v New Zealand

Domestic team information
- Years: Team
- 2000–2018: Essex (squad no. 7)
- 2001: Durham UCCE
- 2012/13: Northern Districts

Career statistics
Competition	Test	ODI	FC	LA
Matches	7	11	289	223
Runs scored	226	41	13,761	3,357
Batting average	25.11	13.66	36.69	28.44
100s/50s	0/0	0/0	23/70	0/16
Top score	48	13	212	83*
Balls bowled	–	–	84	–
Wickets	–	–	1	–
Bowling average	–	–	128.00	–
5 wickets in innings	–	–	0	–
10 wickets in match	–	–	0	–
Best bowling	–	–	1/122	–
Catches/stumpings	17/1	13/7	839/62	246/65
- Source: Cricinfo, 14 May 2018

James Savin Foster (born 15 April 1980) is an English cricket coach and former cricketer. A wicket-keeper who played seven Tests and 11 One Day Internationals in 2001–02 and 2002–03.

== Education ==
He was educated at Forest School, Walthamstow and Durham University (Collingwood College), where he completed the Sport in the Community course. In 2001, and still an undergraduate, he was called up for an England winter tour.

== Playing career ==
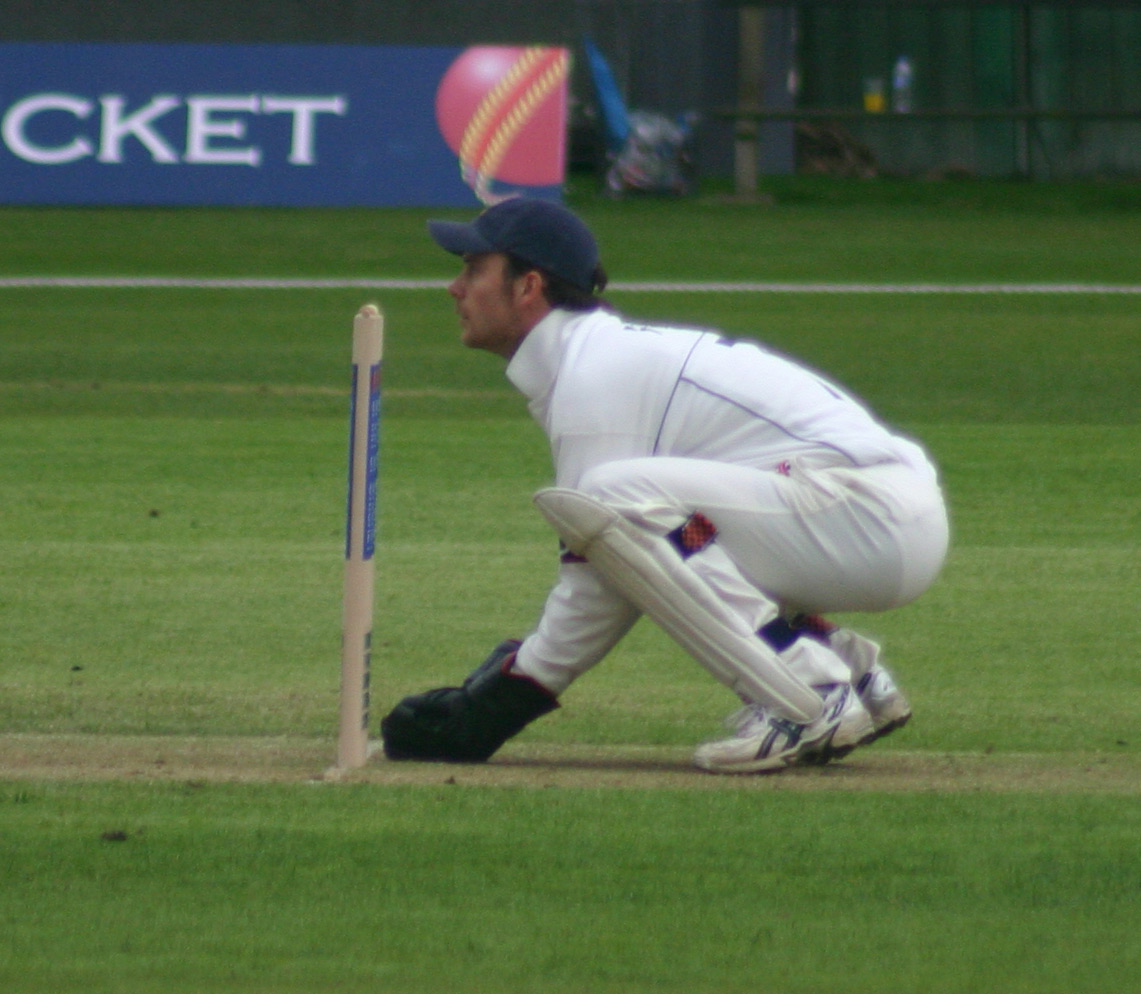
Foster in action against Cambridge UCCE, April 2005

In county cricket, Foster has played for Essex since his County Championship debut in 2000 and in 2009 Season was selected as vice captain. He made his maiden first-class hundred against Worcestershire in 2001, but two broken bones ruined his 2002 season and though 2003 was a better year there was little hint of the startling summer he was to enjoy with the bat in 2004. That season he hit four more centuries, including 212 against Leicestershire as Essex made 708/9 declared. He also passed 1,000 runs for the season for the first time, averaging 51.85, and claimed 51 victims. In the 2006 season, he averaged 42.41 in the Liverpool Victoria County Championship and showed good form with the gloves and bat in one day cricket also.

Foster was the recipient of the NBC Denis Compton Award in 2001.

In the winter of 2007–2008, Foster played for England Lions team for their tour to India, after being called up following an injury to Worcestershire's Steven Davies.

Good form with both the gloves and the bat in recent seasons kept Foster in the selectors minds' for a possible recall to the England setup, demonstrated by his selection for the MCC season opener against Sussex in 2008. This was realised when he was picked as the only regular wicket-keeper in England's 30-man squad for the 2009 ICC World Twenty20. Debate continued in the run up to the 2009 Ashes series whether Foster should be selected as the Test wicketkeeper for England.

Foster played for England in the 2009 ICC World Twenty20, receiving high praise for his sharp keeping and stumpings of Yuvraj Singh and Dwayne Bravo. However, due to the preference of selectors for wicketkeepers who can bat fluently, Matt Prior remained the first-choice for England, and these five appearances were the total of his T20I appearances.

Foster was made county captain of Essex in June 2010 for all forms of the game, when Mark Pettini stepped down due to poor form with the bat. In 2011, Foster was given a beneficiary by Essex, and this included many events such as a Twenty20 match named "Fozzy's Big Bash". This match featured the Essex 1st XI vs an All Star XI, which included leading Test wicket-taker Muttiah Muralitharan and former England all-rounder Andrew Flintoff among others. He was replaced as captain in December 2015. His continued form, particularly behind the stumps, was one of the factors that led to two promising wicket-keeper batsmen, Adam Wheater and Ben Foakes to leave the county to further develop their careers. In 2018 he shared keeping duties with Wheater who had returned from Hampshire, and then Foster retired at the end of the season after hearing that Essex would not be renewing his contract.

James Foster has been known to display a fiery temperament. This was demonstrated in a televised T20 game vs Surrey County Cricket Club in 2011 at The Oval. Foster was the recipient of a waist-high full toss from Zander de Bruyn, which Foster was caught out from. A heated argument with the umpires then followed. Foster was subsequently fined an undisclosed amount by Essex County Cricket Club and also given a two match ban by the ECB.

== Coaching career ==
Foster after retiring from cricket, was appointed as the T20 batting consultant for Glamorgan for 2019 t20 Blast. He was appointed as the head coach of Khulna Tigers, for 2019-20 season, a franchise of Bangladesh Premier League. Also he is appointed as fielding coach of Kolkata Knight Riders for IPL 2020 season., in 2022 he was appointed as the head coach of Peshawar Zalmi replacing Daren Sammy few days before the 2022 Pakistan Super League, who was unable to perform his duties for personal reasons. In November 2022, he was named as the assistant coach for Kolkata Knight Riders. For 2026 IPL, He will be a fielding coach for Chennai Super Kings.
