= Michael Comber =

English cricketer (born 1989)

Michael Andrew Comber (born 26 October 1989) is an English former cricketer from Clacton-on-Sea, Essex. He attended Clacton County High School.

Michael was a medium paced bowler and batsmen who played for Essex County Cricket Club before being released at the end of the 2012 season. He began his career at Clacton Cricket Club.
