= Imran Arif =

British cricketer

Personal information
- Full name: Imran Arif
- Born: 15 January 1984 (age 42); Kotli, Azad Kashmir, Pakistan
- Batting: Right-handed
- Bowling: Right-arm fast-medium
- Role: Bowler

Domestic team information
- Years: Team
- 2008–2010: Worcestershire
- 2012: Staffordshire
- 2014: Azad Jammu and Kashmir Jaguars
- FC debut: 17 July 2008 Worcestershire v Glamorgan
- Last FC: 27 April 2010 Worcestershire v Glamorgan
- LA debut: 3 August 2008 Worcestershire v Sussex
- Last LA: 4 September 2010 Worcestershire v Lancashire

Career statistics
Competition	FC	LA	T20
Matches	17	13	13
Runs scored	102	23	32
Batting average	10.20	–	16.00
100s/50s	0/0	0/0	0/0
Top score	35	16*	16
Balls bowled	2,260	463	180
Wickets	43	11	2
Bowling average	37.55	46.90	136.50
5 wickets in innings	2	0	0
10 wickets in match	0	0	0
Best bowling	5/50	2/43	1/30
Catches/stumpings	6/–	6/–	0/–
- Source: CricketArchive, 1 November 2022

Imran Arif (born 15 January 1984) is an English first-class cricketer. A fast-medium bowler, he played for Worcestershire County Cricket Club.

He played in the second XI for Sussex during the 2007 season before moving to Worcestershire, where he played five second XI matches before earning a place in the first team, making his first-class debut against Glamorgan in July 2008, where he took seven wickets in the match, including 5/50 in the first innings as Worcestershire won by ten wickets.

He signed for Worcestershire as an overseas player, and a new two-year contract with Worcestershire could not be completed until he received a British passport. By 2009 he had lived in the UK for eight years, but did not hold a UK passport. He was granted this in March 2009, and Worcestershire's Director of Cricket Steve Rhodes told the Worcester News that Arif had "a wonderful talent". He added: "if he bowls like he did last year we will be very impressed."

In 2009 Arif was allocated to Kidderminster Victoria Cricket Club by Worcestershire.

Arif was released by Worcestershire at the end of the 2010 season having failed to hold down a first-team place in 2009 or 2010.
