= Mick Newell =

English cricketer and director

Personal information
- Full name: Michael Newell
- Born: 25 February 1965 (age 61); Blackburn, Lancashire, England
- Height: 5 ft 8 in (1.73 m)
- Batting: Right-handed
- Bowling: Right arm leg-break

Domestic team information
- Years: Team
- 1984–1992: Nottinghamshire

Career statistics
Competition	First-class	List A
Matches	102	40
Runs scored	4,636	962
Batting average	30.50	30.06
100s/50s	6/24	2/18
Top score	203*	109*
Balls bowled	363	6
Wickets	7	0
Bowling average	40.28	–
5 wickets in innings	0	–
10 wickets in match	0	–
Best bowling	2/38	–
Catches/stumpings	93/1	13/–
- Source: CricketArchive, 28 July 2013

Michael Newell (born 25 February 1965) is the current Director of Cricket of Nottinghamshire County Cricket Club and a retired English cricketer. He was born at Blackburn.

Sporting positions
Preceded by Clive Rice	Nottinghamshire County cricket coach 2002–2016	Succeeded by Peter Moores
