= Luke Wright =

English cricketer

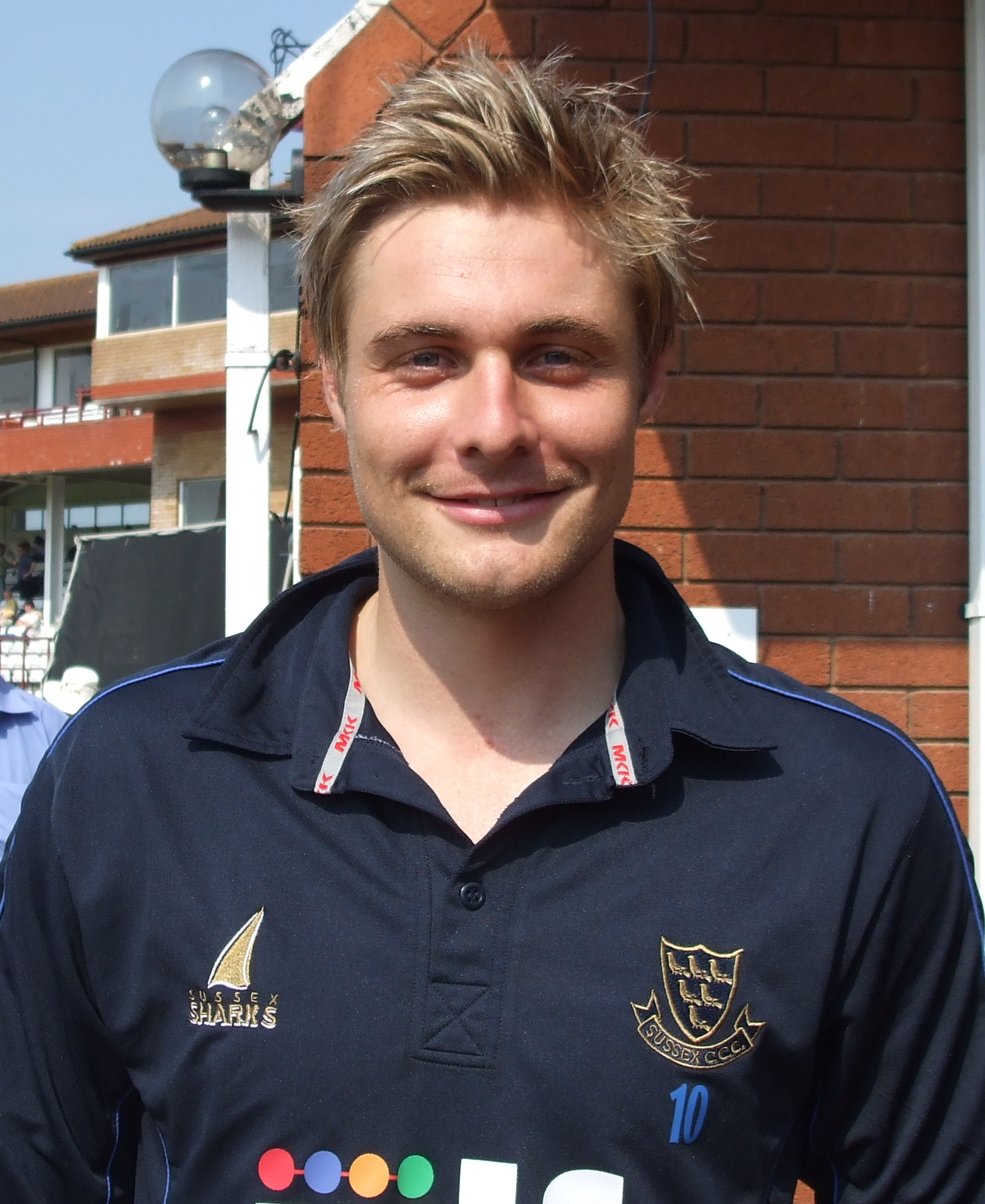
- Wright in 2008

Personal information
- Full name: Luke James Wright
- Born: 7 March 1985 (age 41); Grantham, Lincolnshire, England
- Height: 6 ft 0 in (1.83 m)
- Batting: Right-handed
- Bowling: Right-arm medium
- Role: Top-order batsman
- Relatives: Ashley Wright (brother)

International information
- National side: England (2007–2014)
- ODI debut (cap 204): 5 September 2007 v India
- Last ODI: 2 March 2014 v West Indies
- ODI shirt no.: 6
- T20I debut (cap 32): 13 September 2007 v Zimbabwe
- Last T20I: 11 March 2014 v West Indies
- T20I shirt no.: 6

Domestic team information
- Years: Team
- 2003: Leicestershire
- 2004–2022: Sussex (squad no. 10)
- 2010/11: Wellington
- 2011/12–2017/18: Melbourne Stars
- 2012: Impi
- 2012–2013: Pune Warriors India
- 2013: Dhaka Gladiators
- 2013: Abahani Limited
- 2013/14–2014/15: Auckland
- 2016–2017: Quetta Gladiators
- 2017: Rajshahi Kings
- 2019: Dhaka Dynamites
- 2021: Trent Rockets

Career statistics
Competition	ODI	T20I	FC	LA
Matches	50	51	144	211
Runs scored	707	759	7,622	5,126
Batting average	20.20	18.97	38.11	33.07
100s/50s	0/2	0/4	17/38	11/19
Top score	52	99*	226*	166
Balls bowled	1,038	330	8,264	4,752
Wickets	15	18	120	111
Bowling average	58.93	25.83	40.51	38.11
5 wickets in innings	0	0	3	0
10 wickets in match	0	0	0	0
Best bowling	2/34	2/24	5/65	4/12
Catches/stumpings	18/–	14/–	58/–	66/–
- Source: ESPNcricinfo, 13 May 2019

Luke James Wright (born 7 March 1985) is an English former cricketer. He was a right-handed batsman and a right-arm medium bowler. Wright joined Sussex in 2004, having started his career at Leicestershire. He was named in England's squad for the Under-19 World Cup in 2004, and joined the International Twenty20 squad for the 2007 Twenty20 World Championship in September 2007. He made his One Day International debut on 5 September 2007 against India. In November 2022, he became a selector for the England men's team, announcing his retirement from playing at the same time. Wright was a member of the England team that won the 2010 ICC World Twenty20.

== County career ==
Wright hit a century on debut for Sussex, and has won the Denis Compton medal on three occasions during his domestic career. On 26 June 2007 he smashed his maiden domestic Twenty20 Cup century, scoring 103 from only 45 balls, including 11 fours and six sixes before being bowled by Yasir Arafat in Sussex's 7 wicket win over Kent at Canterbury. Although Sussex were defeated in the semi-finals, Wright ended up as the highest run scorer of the competition. Wright had success in the longer one day formats, hitting 125 against Gloucestershire from 73 deliveries.

In April 2008, Wright played for the Marylebone Cricket Club (MCC) at the opening match of the 2008 county season. Making 15 in the first innings while Sussex were bowled out for 171, he hit a quickfire 155* from 185 deliveries, with 21 fours and three sixes, during a rain-interrupted second innings. In May 2008 he was selected for the England Lions team to face the touring New Zealand side at the beginning of the latter's tour of England. With the Lions struggling, Wright hit 120 off 131 deliveries to bring them to 280 all out, giving rise to speculation about his place in the national team.

== England career ==
Wright represented England at Under-17 level. In 2003 he travelled to Australia with the Under-19 team and took a hat-trick against South Africa, finishing with match figures of 5/46. In February 2006 he toured the West Indies to bolster the England A team.

In July 2007, he was selected in the preliminary 30-man England Squad for the 2007 Twenty20 World Championship in September, having been the top domestic Twenty20 scorer with 346 runs that season, and on 6 August he was named in the final 15-man squad. On 3 September it was announced that he would also join the England ODI squad as a replacement for the injured Ravi Bopara and Andrew Flintoff for the final two matches against India.

On 5 September 2007 Wright made his One Day International debut against India at The Oval, London; hitting a half century in a 106 run 6th wicket stand with Middlesex batsmen Owais Shah. Wright was run out on 50, by a matter of inches after facing just 39 balls, and received a standing ovation. In his second match at Lords he was out for a second ball duck. He also took a good low catch to remove Gautam Gambhir.

Wright was selected for the 2007 Twenty20 World Cup in South Africa, and played his first match on 13 September against Zimbabwe, where he was out caught behind on this first ball. He then suffered a number of ducks and single figure scores during the tournament, batting at both number 3 and down in the lower order.

Wright was selected for the 2008 Tour to New Zealand, and after impressing with both bat and ball in the two practice matches, he was selected to play in three of the five matches. In the ODI series, which England went on to lose, Wright hit 71 runs at 35.5 and sent down five overs at the cost of 28 runs. These overs included the final over of a tied-ODI, where New Zealand needed seven to win and only managed six from Wright's bowling.

After this, he continued to be a regular member of England's Twenty20 and ODI squads, playing in home series against New Zealand and South Africa in 2008, although he was never assured of a place in the starting XI and his place in the batting order was uncertain. In the autumn of 2009, he played against Australia, in a 6–1 loss, and in a surprisingly successful run at the ICC Champions Trophy, which was held in South Africa, where England beat the hosts and Sri Lanka before being thrashed by 9 wickets against Australia in the semi-finals (in which Wright scored 49, putting on a century partnership with Tim Bresnan). In that match he and Bresnan set the highest 7th wicket partnership in ICC Champions Trophy history (107)

Following the Champions Trophy, in October 2009 Wright was called up to England's Test squad for the first time for the winter tour of South Africa. His inclusion was to fill the all-rounder's spot vacated by Andrew Flintoff's retirement after the 2009 Ashes. Geoff Miller, England's chairman of selectors, said "The retirement of Andrew Flintoff has created a vacancy for an all-rounder in the squad and while we do not see Luke Wright as a like for like replacement for Andrew, we are excited by the way in which his all-round game continues to develop and believe he can make an impact at Test level". However he did not play and his career ended without playing test cricket.

Wright was very much a regular of the England one day side, however, and was a member of the England Twenty20 squads for both the 2009 and 2010 tournaments where he was a member of the winning England team.

== Personal life ==
Wright attended Ratcliffe College in Ratcliffe on the Wreake, Leicestershire and made his first-class debut for Leicestershire at age 18.

Wright met his wife Rebecca whilst on tour in New Zealand in 2009. They got engaged whilst he was on a South African tour on Christmas Eve 2010 and married on 30 September 2011.

At 3:30pm on 27 November 2011, Luke's first child was born, Joshua James, Luke soon posted a picture of him on his Twitter page.

He is a supporter of Newcastle United F.C.

== T20 franchise career ==
In the 2011/2012 Australian season, Wright joined the Melbourne Stars in the inaugural Big Bash League. On 9 January, Wright smashed 117 from 60 deliveries including nine sixes and eight fours against the Hobart Hurricanes at Blundstone Arena. This was the highest score in Australian domestic Twenty20 up until D’Arcy Short's 122* in BBL 07. In the same match, Wright and teammate Rob Quiney set up a 172-run opening stand which is the highest for any wicket in a domestic Twenty20 match.

In the inaugural season of the Pakistan Super League in February 2016, Luke Wright played for Quetta Gladiators. He was retained for the 2nd season which started from 9 February 2017.

In September 2018, he was named in Paktia's squad in the first edition of the Afghanistan Premier League tournament. In July 2019, he was selected to play for the Belfast Titans in the inaugural edition of the Euro T20 Slam cricket tournament. However, the following month the tournament was cancelled.

In April 2022, he was bought by the Northern Superchargers for the 2022 season of The Hundred. He announced his retirement from all forms of cricket in November 2022.

== England selector ==
In November 2022, Wright became a selector for the England men's team.
