= Neil Dexter =

South African-born English cricketer

Personal information
- Full name: Neil John Dexter
- Born: 21 August 1984 (age 42); Johannesburg, Transvaal Province, South Africa
- Nickname: Dex
- Height: 6 ft 0 in (1.83 m)
- Batting: Right-handed
- Bowling: Right arm medium
- Role: All-rounder

Domestic team information
- Years: Team
- 2005–2008: Kent (squad no. 21)
- 2008: → Essex (loan)
- 2008–2015: Middlesex (squad no. 4)
- 2016–2019: Leicestershire (squad no. 17)
- First-class debut: 16 August 2005 Kent v Bangladesh A
- List A debut: 18 September 2005 Kent v Sussex

Career statistics
Competition	FC	LA	T20
Matches	162	108	134
Runs scored	8,316	2,070	1,879
Batting average	34.65	29.57	19.77
100s/50s	18/39	2/9	0/3
Top score	180	135*	73
Balls bowled	11,095	2,457	1,499
Wickets	169	48	66
Bowling average	34.39	48.25	28.69
5 wickets in innings	6	0	0
10 wickets in match	0	0	0
Best bowling	6/63	4/22	4/21
Catches/stumpings	98/–	27/–	47/–
- Source: ESPNcricinfo, 30 September 2019

Neil John Dexter (born 21 August 1984) is a South African-born English cricketer.

== Early life ==
Dexter was born in Johannesburg and attended Northwood School in Durban North and Downside School in Somerset in England. He went on to study at the University of South Africa.

== Career ==
He is a right-handed batsman and a right-arm medium bowler. He made his debut for Kent against Nottinghamshire at Canterbury, hitting an unbeaten 79 in his first innings. He then dismissed David Hussey with the first ball in the Notts second innings, although it was declaration bowling to try to force a result, having had no luck in 10 1st innings overs.

Having played two games in the Championship and two games in the totesport League he was contracted for 2006 and found particular success in the Twenty20 Cup competition opening the batting with Darren Stevens. He was loaned to Essex County Cricket Club for a month and made his debut against Middlesex County Cricket Club in the Twenty20 Cup on 12 June 2008. Dexter top scored with 47, as the team went down to a defeat. It was announced on 16 September 2008 that Dexter was to leave Kent at the end of the 2008 season to join Middlesex. He played for Middlesex in the Stanford Super Series. He captained Middlesex between 2010 and 2013.

On 7 September 2015 it was announced that Dexter had signed a three-year contract with Leicestershire which would run until the end of the 2018 season. He was released on 27 September 2019. He has signed to play white ball cricket for Suffolk C.C.C. for 2020.

Sporting positions
Preceded by Shaun Udal	Middlesex County cricket captain 2010–2013	Succeeded by Chris Rogers
