= Mark Pettini =

English cricketer

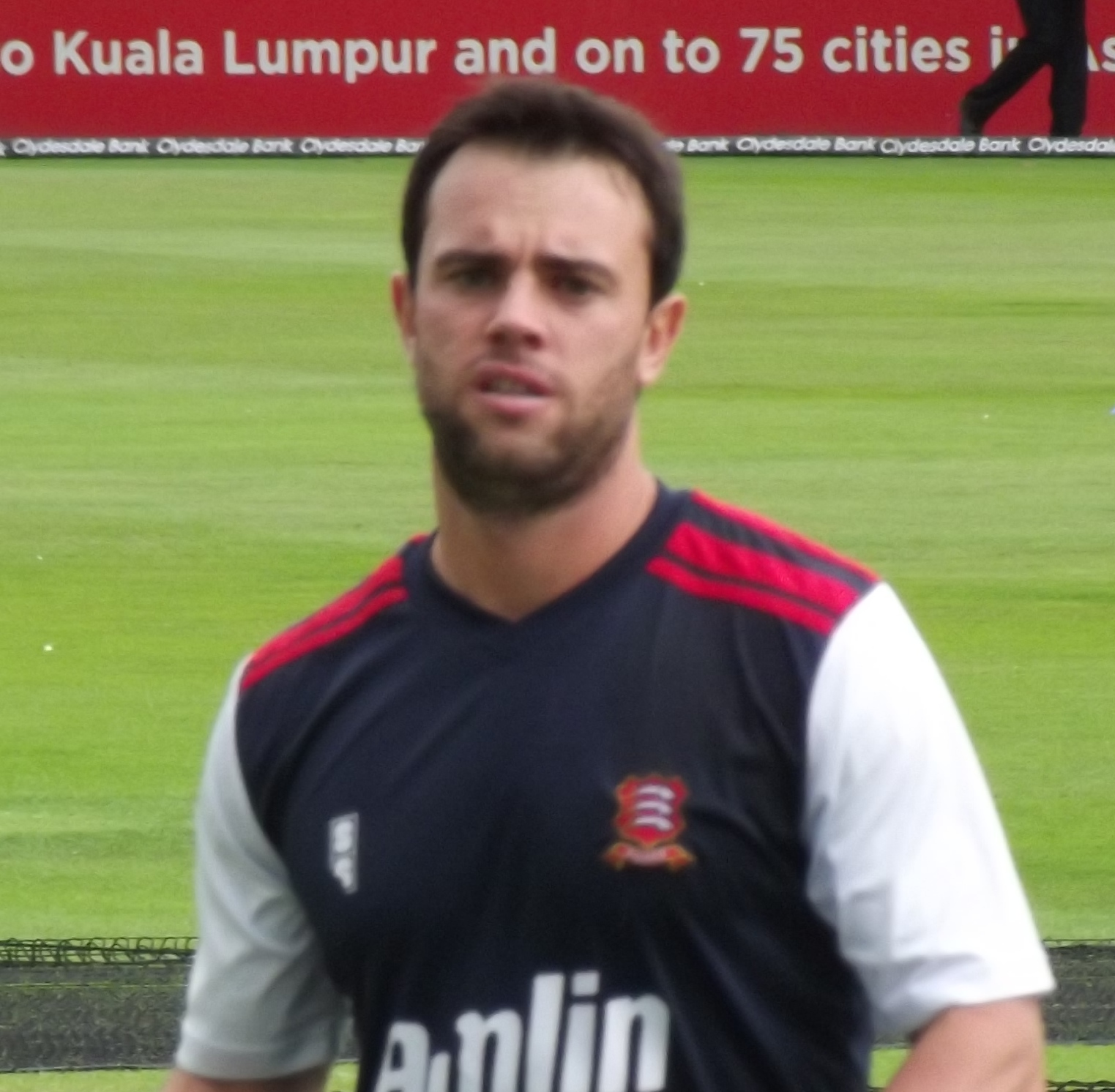

Personal information
- Full name: Mark Lewis Pettini
- Born: 7 August 1983 (age 43); Brighton, East Sussex, England
- Nickname: Swamps
- Height: 5 ft 11 in (1.80 m)
- Batting: Right-handed
- Bowling: Right-arm medium
- Role: Batsman

Domestic team information
- Years: Team
- 2001–2015: Essex (squad no. 24)
- 2011/12–2013/14: Mountaineers
- 2014/15: Kala Bagan Krira Chakra
- 2014/15–2015/16: Mashonaland Eagles
- 2016–2017: Leicestershire (squad no. 6)
- First-class debut: 12 September 2001 Essex v Yorkshire
- List A debut: 9 September 2001 Essex v Derbyshire

Career statistics
Competition	FC	LA	T20
Matches	178	188	135
Runs scored	8,933	4,811	3,284
Batting average	35.16	29.88	27.14
100s/50s	15/49	9/30	0/21
Top score	209	159	95*
Balls bowled	132	–	–
Wickets	1	–	–
Bowling average	263.00	–	–
5 wickets in innings	0	–	–
10 wickets in match	0	–	–
Best bowling	1/72	–	–
Catches/stumpings	120/–	69/–	43/–
- Source: CricketArchive, 16 September 2017

Mark Lewis Pettini (born 7 August 1983) is an English former cricketer who played domestically for Essex and Leicestershire. He was a right-handed batsman and very occasional wicket-keeper and right-arm medium-pace bowler.

== Playing style ==
An aggressive batsman, Pettini specialised in one-day cricket, where he usually opened the batting so as to make use of the batting powerplay in the early overs. In County Championship cricket, he batted in the middle order. He fielded in a wide range of positions, but usually fielded at mid-off during his time as captain. His bowling was very rarely used, and when it was used, it was often in a declaration agreement.

== Playing career ==
An expert in the limited-overs game, he was one of the key cameo figures in Essex's 2005 domestic one-day league title winning season, having previously gained experience as an England Under-19 player, having played twice against India during their English tour of 2002.

Instrumental in achieving promotion for Essex during 2002, Pettini was known for his aggressive style of play. He has participated in the Twenty20 Cup each year since 2003, achieving a solid record in this competition.

His highest first-class score was 208 not out, made against Derbyshire in September 2006. Later the same month, against Leicestershire in the last match of the 2006 County Championship, he hit 114 not out from 29 balls, but this innings was made against "declaration" bowling and so was not eligible for the Walter Lawrence Trophy, nor did it count as a first-class record.

In July 2007, Pettini was included in England's provisional squad of 30 for the inaugural Twenty20 World Cup, but a loss of form cost him a place in the final squad for the tournament.

In June 2007, Pettini became permanent captain of Essex County Cricket Club following the retirement of Ronnie Irani due to a knee injury. He had earlier held the job on a temporary basis while Irani was sidelined.

At the start of the 2008 season, Pettini decided to move from opener to number five in the Essex batting order in four-day cricket. This change was made due to his indifferent batting form during the second half of the 2007 season. However, he would continue as an opening batsman in one-day cricket.

Pettini began 2008 in superb form, hitting 153 not out against Cambridge UCCE, 80 not out in the LV County Championship Division Two opener against Northamptonshire at Chelmsford and 119 in Essex's first Friends Provident Trophy South East Division match against Kent at Canterbury.

However, in Essex's next match, a county championship match against Derbyshire at Derby, Pettini was forced to miss the second and third days' play after suffering an astigmatism in his eye. He travelled to Cambridge to see a specialist for treatment. The eye problem would flare up again just a day before the county's Friends Provident Trophy final against Kent at Lord's.

Pettini's form tailed off somewhat, but he did hit a match-winning 144 against the Surrey Brown Caps in a Friends Provident Trophy match at the Oval on 11 May 2008. That game saw Essex score 391–5 from their 50 overs.

On 16 August 2008, Pettini captained Essex to victory in the Friends Provident Trophy final at Lord's. He scored 10 opening the batting as the Eagles beat Kent Spitfires by five wickets to lift their first one-day knockout trophy since 1997.

Pettini's father, Max, is an astronomer. Mark himself graduated with an astronomy degree from Cardiff University and has a keen interest in the subject. He is also a keen fisherman and loves darts, attending a number of PDC events with best friend Alastair Cook. During the 2008 season, Pettini stated on his Sky Sports profile that his sporting hero is Sid Waddell.

Pettini also wrote a weekly column called "Pett Sounds" in the Southend Echo and Colchester Gazette newspapers.

After some poor form with the bat, Pettini decided to resign his county captaincy for all forms of the game in June 2010. James Foster took over as Essex captain. Pettini then took a few weeks off to work on his batting.

At the end of the 2015 season, Pettini was announced as moving from Essex to Leicestershire.
