= Yasir Arafat (cricketer) =

Pakistani cricketer

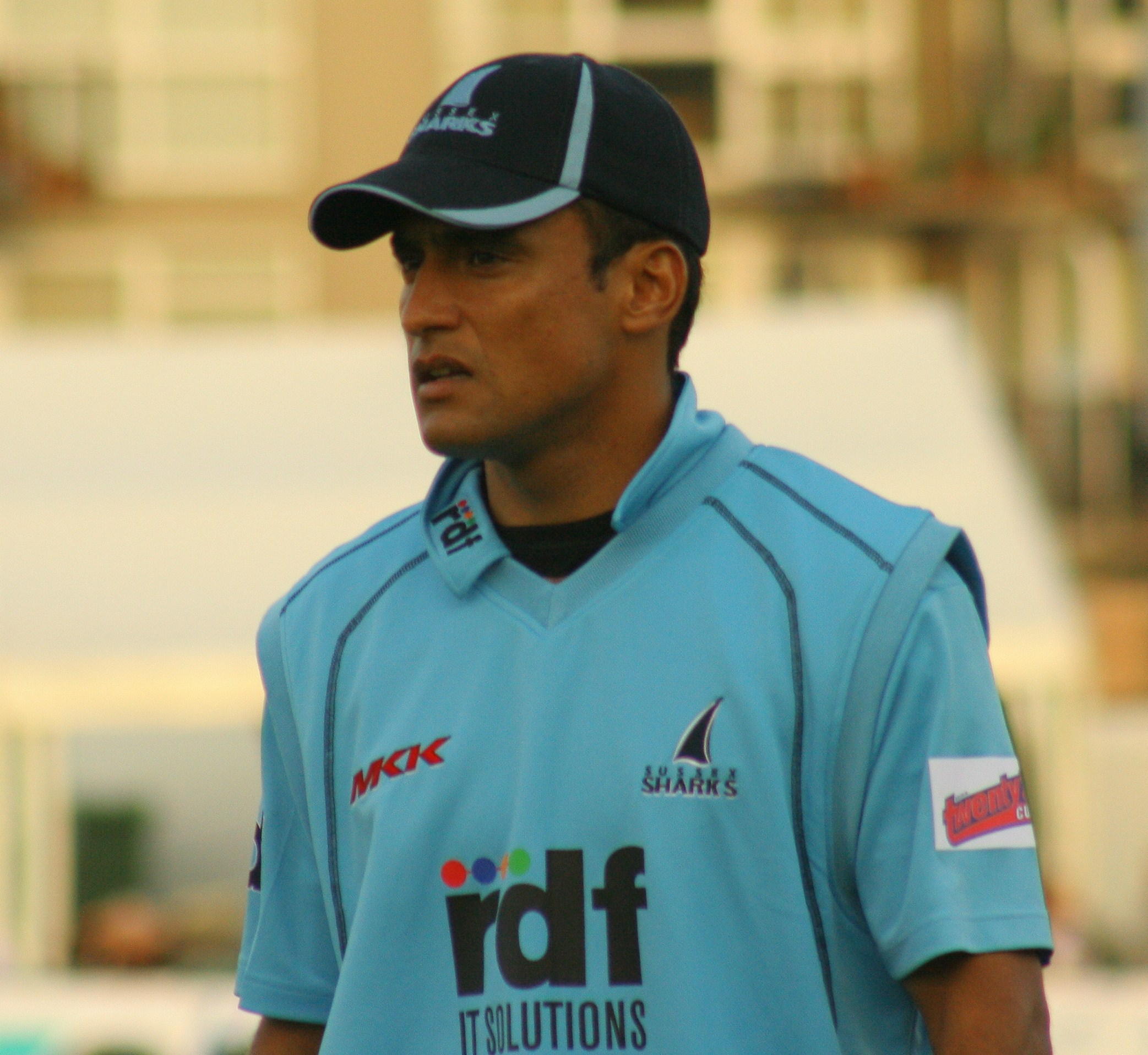
- Yasir Arafat playing for Sussex in 2009

Personal information
- Full name: Yasir Arafat Satti
- Born: 12 March 1982 (age 44); Rawalpindi, Punjab, Pakistan
- Nickname: Yas
- Height: 5 ft 9 in (175 cm)
- Batting: Right-handed
- Bowling: Right-arm fast-medium
- Role: All-rounder

International information
- National side: Pakistan (2000–2012)
- Test debut (cap 189): 8 December 2007 v India
- Last Test: 1 March 2009 v Sri Lanka
- ODI debut (cap 130): 13 February 2000 v Sri Lanka
- Last ODI: 3 May 2009 v Australia
- ODI shirt no.: 27
- T20I debut (cap 19): 2 September 2007 v Bangladesh
- Last T20I: 30 September 2012 v India
- T20I shirt no.: 27

Domestic team information
- Years: Team
- 1997/98–2016/17: Rawalpindi
- 2000/01–2014/15: Khan Research Laboratories
- 2004–2005: Scotland
- 2005/06: National Bank of Pakistan
- 2006, 2009–2010, 2014: Sussex
- 2007–2008: Kent
- 2009/10: Otago
- 2011: Surrey
- 2012: Lancashire
- 2011/12: Canterbury
- 2013: Somerset
- 2013/14–2014/15: Perth Scorchers
- 2015: Hampshire
- 2016: → Somerset (on loan)

Career statistics
Competition	Test	ODI	FC	LA
Matches	3	11	207	256
Runs scored	94	74	7,110	2,922
Batting average	47.00	14.80	27.55	21.96
100s/50s	0/1	0/0	5/38	1/10
Top score	50*	27	170	110*
Balls bowled	627	414	33,357	12,045
Wickets	9	4	790	404
Bowling average	48.66	93.25	24.08	24.90
5 wickets in innings	1	0	44	8
10 wickets in match	0	0	5	0
Best bowling	5/161	1/28	9/35	6/24
Catches/stumpings	0/–	2/–	56/–	59/–
- Source: CricInfo, 9 November 2019

Yasir Arafat Satti (born 12 March 1982) is a Pakistani cricket coach and former international cricketer, an all-rounder who batted right-handed and bowled right-arm fast. He was noted for his "slingy pace" and full-length bowling, while with the bat he was destructive coming down the order.

== Early life ==
Arafat spent some of his childhood years in New Delhi, India where he studied till second grade, as his father worked at the visa section of Pakistan High Commission. His father had named him after the Palestinian leader Yasser Arafat.

His father trained him in cricket from the age of 7, and later pushed him into yoga as well martial arts, Yasir earning a green belt in the kyokushin style of karate at the age of 9.

== Cricket career ==
=== International career ===
Having previously represented his country at the under-15 level, Arafat made his ODI debut for Pakistan in 2000 when he was 17 years old against Sri Lanka in Karachi and took his first wicket in this match. He played just one more match the following year before being dropped. He was given a second chance at international cricket in the last ODI against England in December 2005 and was retained for the series against India in February 2006, but was left out of the ODI squad for the subsequent tour in England. His next chance at international cricket came in the 2006 ICC Champions Trophy when he was one of the players called up to the Pakistan squad for the Champions Trophy to replace Shoaib Akhtar and Mohammad Asif who had both failed drug tests.

In March 2007, he and Mohammad Sami were called up as replacements in Pakistan's squad for the 2007 Cricket World Cup after Shoaib Akhtar and Mohammad Asif were ruled out through injury.

On 8 December 2007, Arafat made his Test match debut for Pakistan against India in Bangalore in the third and final Test of the series. He displayed his all-round abilities by taking 7 wickets in the match including a 5-wicket haul, and scoring 44 in the first innings.

He was part of Pakistan squad for 2009 ICC World Twenty20 but was later replaced due to hamstring injury.

=== Domestic and T20 franchise career ===
In English domestic cricket, he was signed as an overseas player for Scotland as a replacement for Rahul Dravid, and played for them in the 2004 and 2005 seasons. He was signed as an overseas player for Sussex for the 2006 season to line up alongside fellow countrymen Mushtaq Ahmed and Rana Naved-ul-Hasan, and helped the team to win the double of the County Championship and the C&G Trophy as well as mount a serious challenge in the Pro40 League. He was signed up to play for Kent in the 2007 season.

In 2004, Arafat performed the extremely rare feat of taking five wickets in six balls for Rawalpindi against the national champions Faisalabad in the Quaid-e-Azam Trophy. This had only been achieved three times previously in the entire history of first-class cricket: by Bill Copson in 1937, William Henderson in 1938 and Pat Pocock in 1972. Arafat was the only bowler to take the wickets spread over two innings.

In August 2008, it was reported that he was signed by Kolkata Knight Riders to play in the second season of the Indian Premier League tournament but the deal wasn't finalized due to tense atmosphere between India Pakistan after the 2008 Mumbai attacks.

Following the 2008 season, Arafat signed once more for Sussex as their overseas player for 2009, signing to return again for another season in 2010. In 2011 he signed for Surrey County Cricket Club. He joined Lancashire as an overseas player for the 2012 Friends Life t20.

In November 2011, he was signed by Canterbury to play in the 2011–12 HRV Cup.

Arafat was signed to play in Big Bash League franchise Perth Scorchers in December 2013. In 2016, he was signed by Somerset from Hampshire on a season-long loan deal as a non-overseas player.

== Coaching career ==
Moving to England after his retirement, where he took permanent residence, he coached teams at junior level while in 2023 he became the first former Test cricketer from Pakistan to complete the England and Wales Cricket Board (ECB) level 4 coaching course.

He coached Surrey CCC as a bowling consultant in 2011 and later in 2022. He joined the South African men's cricket team as a mentor for 2025 ICC Champions Trophy.

== See also ==
- List of Pakistan cricketers who have taken five-wicket hauls on Test debut
