= Glamorgan County Cricket Club in 2016 =

Glamorgan County Cricket Club
2016 season
- Coach: (Wales) Robert Croft
- Captain: (South Africa) Jacques Rudolph
- Overseas player: (South Africa) Jacques Rudolph (Australia) Shaun Tait (Twenty20 only)
- Ground(s): Sophia Gardens, Cardiff; St Helen's, Swansea; Penrhyn Avenue, Rhos-on-Sea; Spytty Park, Newport
- County Championship: 8th, Division Two
- One-Day Cup: 7th, South Group
- T20 Blast: Quarter-finals
- Most runs: FC: Will Bragg (1,126); LA: Colin Ingram (367); T20: Colin Ingram (502)
- Most wickets: FC: Timm van der Gugten (56); LA: Graham Wagg (11); Michael Hogan (11); T20: Timm van der Gugten (19)
- Most catches: FC: Aneurin Donald (12); LA: Graham Wagg (6); T20: Colin Ingram (10)
- Most wicket-keeping dismissals: FC: Mark Wallace (53 ct + 1 st); LA: Chris Cooke (4 ct + 0 st); T20: Chris Cooke (10 ct + 2 st)

The 2016 season was Glamorgan County Cricket Club's 129th year of existence and its 96th as a first-class cricket county. They finished eighth in the Second Division of the County Championship and seventh in the South Group of the 50-over One-Day Cup; meanwhile, after finishing second in the South Group of the T20 Blast, they were beaten by 90 runs by Yorkshire in the quarter-finals. This was the first season as head coach for former player Robert Croft. The club captain was overseas player Jacques Rudolph. Unlike most other counties, Glamorgan competed in limited-overs cricket without a nickname for the fourth year in a row.

== Squad ==
- No. denotes the player's squad number, as worn on the back of their shirt.
- ‡ denotes players with international caps.
- * denotes a player who has been awarded a county cap.
- Ages given as of the first day of the County Championship season, 17 April 2016.

No.	Name	Nationality	Birth date	Batting style	Bowling style	Notes
Batsmen
3	James Kettleborough	England	22 October 1992 (aged 23)	Right-handed	Right arm off break	
4	Jacques Rudolph ‡	South Africa	4 May 1981 (aged 34)	Left-handed	Right arm leg break	Overseas player; club captain
6	Jeremy Lawlor	Wales	4 November 1995 (aged 20)	Right-handed	Right arm off break	
9	Nick Selman	Australia	18 October 1995 (aged 20)	Right-handed	Right arm medium	
12	Aneurin Donald	Wales	20 December 1996 (aged 19)	Right-handed	Right arm off break	
41	Colin Ingram	South Africa	3 July 1985 (aged 30)	Left-handed	—	Kolpak registration; occasional wicket-keeper
All-rounders
7	Jack Murphy	Wales	15 July 1995 (aged 20)	Left-handed	Left arm fast-medium	
8	Graham Wagg	England	28 April 1983 (aged 32)	Right-handed	Left arm medium	
14	David Lloyd	Wales	15 June 1992 (aged 23)	Right-handed	Right arm off break	
20	Ruaidhri Smith	Scotland	5 August 1994 (aged 21)	Right-handed	Right arm medium	
44	Craig Meschede	South Africa	21 November 1991 (aged 24)	Right-handed	Right arm medium-fast	
Wicket-keepers
18	Mark Wallace*	Wales	19 November 1981 (aged 34)	Left-handed	—	
22	Will Bragg	Wales	24 October 1986 (aged 29)	Left-handed	—	
46	Chris Cooke*	South Africa	30 May 1986 (aged 29)	Right-handed	—	
Bowlers
11	Kieran Bull	Wales	5 April 1995 (aged 21)	Right-handed	Right arm off break	
21	Andrew Salter	Wales	1 June 1993 (aged 22)	Right-handed	Right arm off break	
23	Dean Cosker*	England	7 January 1978 (aged 38)	Right-handed	Slow left-arm orthodox	
27	Dale Steyn	South Africa	27 June 1983 (aged 32)	Right-handed	Right arm fast	Twenty20 only
30	Dewi Penrhyn Jones	Wales	9 September 1994 (aged 21)	Right-handed	Right arm fast	
31	Michael Hogan	Australia	31 May 1981 (aged 34)	Right-handed	Right arm fast-medium	
32	Shaun Tait	Australia	22 February 1983 (aged 33)	Right-handed	Right arm fast	Overseas player; Twenty20 only
64	Timm van der Gugten	Netherlands	25 February 1991 (aged 25)	Right-handed	Right arm fast-medium	
—	Harry Podmore	England	23 July 1994 (aged 21)	Right-handed	Right arm medium	On loan from Middlesex until 25 May 2016

== County Championship ==
In 2016 Glamorgan will play in Division Two of the County Championship.

Team	Pld	W	L	T	D	A	Bat	Bowl	Ded	Pts
Essex (P)	16	6	3	0	7	0	58	46	0	235
Kent	16	5	2	0	8	1	49	38	0	212
Worcestershire	16	6	4	0	5	1	42	35	0	203
Sussex	16	4	2	0	10	0	40	38	0	192
Northamptonshire	16	4	3	0	8	1	42	33	0	184
Gloucestershire	16	4	5	0	7	0	44	40	0	183
Leicestershire	16	4	4	0	8	0	39	40	1	182
Glamorgan	16	3	8	0	5	0	34	42	1	148
Derbyshire	16	0	5	0	10	1	32	32	0	119

17–20 April
Scorecard

Glamorgan	v	Leicestershire
348 (89.3 overs); Graham Wagg 64 (110); Clint McKay 6/73 (20 overs)		427 (132.2 overs); Niall O'Brien 93 (134); David Lloyd 2/61 (14 overs)
191 (53.3 overs); Aneurin Donald 57 (87); Ben Raine 4/57 (16.3 overs)		115/0 (36.1 overs); Paul Horton 64* (105)

Leicestershire won by 10 wickets
Sophia Gardens, Cardiff
Umpires: Steve Garratt and Steve O'Shaughnessy

- Glamorgan won the toss and elected to bat.
- Play on day 2 was reduced to 83 overs due to bad light.
- Points: Leicestershire 23, Glamorgan 5.

24–27 April
Scorecard

Glamorgan	v	Derbyshire
377 (114.4 overs); Will Bragg 127 (217); Tony Palladino 5/83 (27 overs)		345 (94.5 overs); Wayne Madsen 97 (160); Michael Hogan 4/74 (25.5 overs)
87/2 (32 overs); Jacques Rudolph 31* (77); Wes Durston 1/9 (9 overs)

Match drawn
County Ground, Derby
Umpires: Neil Bainton and Nigel Llong

- Glamorgan won the toss and elected to bat.
- Play on day 2 reduced to 48 overs due to rain.
- Play on day 3 reduced to 63 overs due to rain.
- Play on day 4 reduced to 37 overs due to hail.
- Points: Glamorgan 12, Derbyshire 11.

1–4 May
Scorecard

Glamorgan	v	Kent
260 (64.5 overs); Craig Meschede 63 (74); Mitchell Claydon 4/59 (16 overs)		488 (111.2 overs); Daniel Bell-Drummond 84 (119); Michael Hogan 4/91 (29 overs)
414 (94.3 overs); David Lloyd 107 (128); Darren Stevens 4/79 (27 overs)		190/0 (48.4 overs); Daniel Bell-Drummond 86* (147)

Kent won by 10 wickets
St Lawrence Ground, Canterbury
Umpires: Rob Bailey and Nick Cook

- Glamorgan won the toss and elected to bat.
- Harry Podmore (Glam) and Hugh Bernard (Kent) made their first-class debuts.
- Points: Kent 24, Glamorgan 5.

8–11 May
Scorecard

Worcestershire	v	Glamorgan
456/6d (120.2 overs); Brett D'Oliveira 202* (359); Graham Wagg 3/103 (25 overs)		42/4 (20 overs); Chris Cooke 27* (46); Joe Leach 2/15 (8 overs)

Match drawn
Sophia Gardens, Cardiff
Umpires: Jeremy Lloyds and Paul Pollard

- Worcestershire won the toss and elected to bat.
- Play on day 2 was reduced to 45 overs, and no play was possible on days 3 and 4 due to rain.
- Nick Selman (Glam) made his first-class debut.
- Points: Worcestershire 11, Glamorgan 5.

15–18 May
Scorecard

Gloucestershire	v	Glamorgan
262 (67.3 overs); George Hankins 56 (73); Timm van der Gugten 3/49 (15 overs)		330 (99.4 overs); David Lloyd 99 (120); Craig Miles 3/74 (24 overs)
336 (122.3 overs); Cameron Bancroft 70 (158); Michael Hogan 4/83 (34 overs)		143 (49 overs); Mark Wallace 50 (72); Jack Taylor

Gloucestershire won by 125 runs
County Ground, Bristol
Umpires: Richard Illingworth and Graham Lloyd

- Toss uncontested, Glamorgan elected to field.
- Points: Gloucestershire 21, Glamorgan 6.

22–25 May
Scorecard

Glamorgan	v	Essex
260 (75.4 overs); Chris Cooke 63 (106); Graham Napier 5/82 (20.4 overs)		313 (115 overs); Ravi Bopara 80 (174); Timm van der Gugten 5/90 (32 overs)
386/8d (114.5 overs); Will Bragg 161* (312); David Masters 3/95 (36 overs)		160/5 (63 overs); Nick Browne 71 (161); Michael Hogan 2/10 (10 overs)

Match drawn
Sophia Gardens, Cardiff
Umpires: Rob Bailey and Verdayne Smith (West Indies)

- Toss uncontested, Essex elected to field.
- Points: Glamorgan 10, Essex 10.

19–22 June
Scorecard

Glamorgan	v	Kent
351 (80 overs); Graham Wagg 83 (120); Mitchell Claydon 5/106 (23 overs)		282 (88.3 overs); Sean Dickson 75 (138); Timm van der Gugten 5/79 (26.3 overs)
279/6d (73 overs); Aneurin Donald 67 (68); Mitchell Claydon 3/50 (15 overs)

Match drawn
Sophia Gardens, Cardiff
Umpires: Stephen Gale and Tim Robinson

- Toss uncontested, Kent elected to field.
- Adam Rouse (Kent) retired hurt on 31* from 157/5 to 205/6.

2–5 July
Scorecard

Glamorgan	v	Sussex
335 (112.1 overs); Jacques Rudolph 87 (197); Stuart Whittingham 4/58 (26.1 overs)		552/5d (158 overs); Luke Wells 181 (343); Graham Wagg 2/98 (31 overs)
307/6 (97.3 overs); David Lloyd 102* (168); Danny Briggs 2/62 (26 overs)

Match drawn
County Ground, Hove
Umpires: Paul Baldwin and Richard Kettleborough

- Glamorgan won the toss and elected to bat.
- Michael Hogan (Glam) retired hurt on 19 at 335/9 in the first innings.
- Points: Sussex 11, Glamorgan 9.

17–20 July
Scorecard

Glamorgan	v	Derbyshire
518 (104.5 overs); Aneurin Donald 234 (136); Will Davis 7/146 (25.5 overs)		177 (52 overs); Harvey Hosein 27 (79); Craig Meschede 3/33 (12 overs)
200/6 (45.4 overs); Jacques Rudolph 51* (78); Wayne Madsen 2/		536 (f/o) (162.1 overs); Chesney Hughes 122 (219); Graham Wagg 3/93 (29 overs)

Glamorgan won by 4 wickets
Penrhyn Avenue, Rhos-on-Sea
Umpires: Nigel Cowley and Stephen Gale

- Glamorgan won the toss and elected to bat.
- Points: Glamorgan 24, Derbyshire 3.

3–6 August
Scorecard

Northamptonshire	v	Glamorgan
321 (86.4 overs); Rory Kleinveldt 91 (88); David Lloyd 3/36 (10 overs)		236 (80 overs); Nick Selman 122* (208); Azharullah 3/58 (18 overs)
261/9d (58.1 overs); Laurie Evans 73 (123); Timm van der Gugten 5/61 (13.1 overs)		95 (38 overs); Mark Wallace 28* (40); Ben Sanderson 7/22 (13 overs)

Northamptonshire won by 251 runs
St Helen's, Swansea
Umpires: Richard Illingworth and Steve Garratt

- Northamptonshire won the toss and elected to bat.
- Lukas Carey (Glam) made his first-class debut.

13–16 August
Scorecard

Worcestershire	v	Glamorgan
163 (57.4 overs); Joe Leach 43 (54); Michael Hogan 4/44 (15 overs)		280 (77.2 overs); Will Bragg 98 (133); Joe Leach 5/106 (22 overs)
393 (138.1 overs); Joe Clarke 98 (209); Graham Wagg 5/90 (33 overs)		278/5 (87.1 overs); Owen Morgan 103* (242); Joe Leach 3/66 (21 overs)

Glamorgan won by 5 wickets
New Road, Worcester
Umpires: Peter Hartley and Steve Garratt

- No toss.
- Points: Glamorgan 21, Worcestershire 3.

23–26 August
Scorecard

Glamorgan	v	Sussex
252 (60.1 overs); Mark Wallace 61 (59); Jofra Archer 4/91 (21 overs)		283 (109.2 overs); Chris Nash 132 (284); Timm van der Gugten 3/61 (26.2 overs)
263 (77.1 overs); Aneurin Donald 59 (64); Steve Magoffin 3/50 (23 overs)		236/8 (58.4 overs); Chris Nash 64 (108); Timm van der Gugten 5/73 (19 overs)

Sussex won by 2 wickets
Sophia Gardens, Cardiff
Umpires: Jeff Evans and Nigel Cowley

- No toss.
- Points: Sussex 21, Glamorgan 5.

31 August – 2 September
Scorecard

Northamptonshire	v	Glamorgan
269 (82.3 overs); Ben Duckett 80 (100); Kiran Carlson 5/28 (14 overs)		124 (42.5 overs); Jacques Rudolph 37 (86); Rob Keogh 9/52 (18.5 overs)
305/7d (58.4 overs); Ben Duckett 185 (159); Graham Wagg 3/72 (16 overs)		132 (62.5 overs); Nick Selman 30* (131); Graeme White 6/44 (28 overs)

Northamptonshire won by 318 runs
County Ground, Northampton
Umpires: Alex Wharf and Paul Baldwin

- Northamptonshire won the toss and elected to bat.
- Kiran Carlson (Glam) made his first-class debut.
- Points: Northamptonshire 21, Glamorgan 3.

6–8 September
Scorecard

Glamorgan	v	Gloucestershire
220 (64.5 overs); Nick Selman 101 (144); Craig Miles 4/44 (14.5 overs)		363 (130.1 overs); Hamish Marshall 101 (189); Michael Hogan 5/36 (25.1 overs)
232 (58.4 overs); Will Bragg 52 (91); David Payne 4/45 (14 overs)		92/0 (19.4 overs); Gareth Roderick 56* (61)

Gloucestershire won by 10 wickets
Sophia Gardens, Cardiff
Umpires: Jeff Evans and Steve Garratt

- No toss.
- Points: Gloucestershire 22, Glamorgan 3.

12–15 September
Scorecard

Glamorgan	v	Essex
286 (96.3 overs); Kiran Carlson 119 (229); Graham Napier 4/46 (15 overs)		319 (92.5 overs); Ryan ten Doeschate 117 (171); Craig Meschede 5/84 (24.5 overs)
296 (82.2 overs); Mark Wallace 78 (91); Ryan ten Doeschate 2/20 (7 overs)		252 (87.5 overs); Varun Chopra 79 (128); Michael Hogan 5/45 (22 overs)

Glamorgan won by 11 runs
County Ground, Chelmsford
Umpires: Russell Evans and Steve O'Shaughnessy

- Glamorgan won the toss and elected to bat.
- Kiran Carlson (Glam) scored his maiden first-class century.
- Points: Glamorgan 21, Essex 6.

20–22 September
Scorecard

Leicestershire	v	Glamorgan
96 (29.3 overs); Paul Horton 25 (52); Timm van der Gugten 5/52 (12 overs)		199 (42.2 overs); Kiran Carlson 74* (74); Clint McKay 3/12 (7.2 overs)
283 (94.3 overs); Neil Dexter 73 (147); Timm van der Gugten 4/81 (26.3 overs)		154 (39.3 overs); Will Bragg 65 (97); Charlie Shreck 4/33 (11.3 overs)

Leicestershire won by 26 runs
Grace Road, Leicester
Umpires: Billy Taylor and Steve Garratt

- No toss.
- Points: Leicestershire 19, Glamorgan 3.

== One-Day Cup ==
Pos	Team	Pld	W	L	T	NR	Ded	Pts	NRR
1	Somerset	8	6	1	1	0	0	13	−0.087
2	Kent Spitfires	8	5	3	0	0	0	10	0.587
3	Essex Eagles	8	4	2	1	1	0	10	−0.119
4	Surrey	8	4	3	0	1	0	9	0.992
5	Hampshire	8	4	4	0	0	0	8	0.393
6	Middlesex	8	4	4	0	0	0	8	0.117
7	Glamorgan	8	3	4	0	1	0	7	−0.320
8	Gloucestershire	8	2	5	0	1	0	5	−0.709
9	Sussex Sharks	8	1	7	0	0	0	2	−0.679

6 June
Scorecard

Glamorgan; 289 (49.5 overs)	v	Gloucestershire; 237 (47.1 overs)
Will Bragg 75 (68); Benny Howell 2/37 (10 overs)		Benny Howell 77 (67); Timm van der Gugten 3/33 (9.1 overs)

Glamorgan won by 52 runs
Sophia Gardens, Cardiff
Umpires: Mike Burns and Peter Hartley

- Gloucestershire won the toss and elected to field.
- Points: Glamorgan 2, Gloucestershire 0.

8 June
Scorecard

Glamorgan; 302/6 (50 overs)	v	Sussex Sharks; 218 (42.4 overs)
Chris Cooke 80 (67); Danny Briggs 2/45 (10 overs)		Luke Wright 65 (48); Michael Hogan 4/41 (8.4 overs)

Glamorgan won by 84 runs
Sophia Gardens, Cardiff
Umpires: Russell Evans and Jeremy Lloyds

- Glamorgan won the toss and elected to bat.
- Points: Glamorgan 2, Sussex 0.

12 June
Scorecard

Kent Spitfires; 290/3 (42 overs)	v	Glamorgan; 294/7 (40.5 overs)
Sam Billings 106* (54); Timm van der Gugten 1/60 (8 overs)		Colin Ingram 95* (53); James Tredwell 3/55 (8 overs)

Glamorgan won by 3 wickets
St Lawrence Ground, Canterbury
Umpires: Mike Burns and Steve O'Shaughnessy

- Glamorgan won the toss and elected to field.
- Points: Glamorgan 2, Kent 0.

14 June
Scorecard

Middlesex; 294/7 (50 overs)	v	Glamorgan; 266 (48.2 overs)
Brendon McCullum 110 (85); Colin Ingram 3/38 (10 overs)		Colin Ingram 85 (73); James Franklin 3/34 (7 overs)

Middlesex won by 28 runs
Sophia Gardens, Cardiff
Umpires: Billy Taylor and Alex Wharf

- Glamorgan won the toss and elected to field.
- Points: Middlesex 2, Glamorgan 0.

24 July
Scorecard

Somerset; 322/7 (50 overs)	v	Glamorgan; 279 (45.2 overs)
Peter Trego 80 (76); Michael Hogan 3/62 (10 overs)		David Lloyd 46 (50); Lewis Gregory 3/48 (8 overs)

Somerset won by 33 runs (D/L method)
County Ground, Taunton
Umpires: David Millns and Neil Bainton

- Glamorgan won the toss and elected to field.
- Rain reduced the Glamorgan innings to 47 overs.
- Ryan Davies (Somst) made his List A debut.
- Points: Somerset 2, Glamorgan 0.

26 July
Scorecard

Glamorgan; 324/8 (50 overs)	v	Essex; 325/6 (49.1 overs)
Colin Ingram 107 (73); Graham Napier 3/73 (10 overs)		Nick Browne 99 (104); Graham Wagg 2/56 (9.1 overs)

Essex won by 4 wickets
County Cricket Ground, Chelmsford
Umpires: Peter Hartley and Stephen Gale

- Glamorgan won the toss and elected to bat.
- Points: Essex 2, Glamorgan 0.

31 July
Scorecard

Hampshire; 316/5 (50 overs)	v	Glamorgan; 130 (32 overs)
Liam Dawson 100* (68); Graham Wagg 2/74 (10 overs)		Craig Meschede 45 (59); Gareth Berg 4/25 (10 overs)

Hampshire won by 186 runs
St Helen's, Swansea
Umpires: Mike Burns and Nick Cook

- Hampshire won the toss and elected to bat.
- Points: Hampshire 2, Glamorgan 0.

1 August (D/N)
Scorecard

Surrey; 157/1 (19 overs)	v	Glamorgan
Jason Roy 93* (67); Michael Hogan 1/24 (5 overs)

No result
The Oval, London
Umpires: Graham Lloyd and Neil Mallender

- Glamorgan won the toss and elected to field.
- Rain prevented any play after 19 overs of the Surrey innings.
- Points: Surrey 1, Glamorgan 1.

== T20 Blast ==
Pos	Team	Pld	W	L	T	NR	Ded	Pts	NRR
1	Gloucestershire	14	10	3	0	1	0	21	0.518
2	Glamorgan	14	8	3	0	3	0	19	1.005
3	Middlesex	14	7	6	0	1	0	15	0.395
4	Essex Eagles	14	7	6	0	1	0	15	0.174
5	Surrey	14	7	7	0	0	0	14	0.153
6	Sussex Sharks	14	5	6	0	3	0	13	−0.053
7	Kent Spitfires	14	6	8	0	0	0	12	−0.643
8	Hampshire	14	4	8	0	2	0	10	−0.691
9	Somerset	14	3	10	0	1	0	7	−0.660

26 May
Scorecard

Surrey; 93 (17.2 overs)	v	Glamorgan; 96/2 (12.2 overs)
Sam Curran 21 (20); Timm van der Gugten 4/14 (4 overs)		Jacques Rudolph 34* (35); James Burke 1/8 (2 overs)

Glamorgan won by 8 wickets
The Oval, London
Umpires: Nick Cook and Martin Saggers
Player of the match: Timm van der Gugten (Glam)

- Surrey won the toss and elected to bat.
- Points: Glamorgan 2, Surrey 0.

1 June
Scorecard

Glamorgan; 140/6 (20 overs)	v	Essex Eagles; 143/3 (16.2 overs)
Aneurin Donald 51 (38); Ravi Bopara 2/18 (4 overs)		Jesse Ryder 42 (23); Dean Cosker 1/22 (4 overs)

Essex won by 7 wickets
Sophia Gardens, Cardiff
Umpires: Nigel Cowley and Jeff Evans
Player of the match: Jesse Ryder (Essex)

- Essex won the toss and elected to field.
- Points: Essex 2, Glamorgan 0.

3 June
Scorecard

Hampshire; 141 (18.3 overs)	v	Glamorgan; 143/5 (16.1 overs)
Adam Wheater 39 (26); Michael Hogan 4/28 (4 overs)		Aneurin Donald 55 (27); Liam Dawson 2/15 (4 overs)

Glamorgan won by 5 wickets
Sophia Gardens, Cardiff
Umpires: Jeff Evans and Peter Hartley
Player of the match: Aneurin Donald (Glam)

- Glamorgan won the toss and elected to field.
- Points: Glamorgan 2, Hampshire 0.

10 June
Scorecard

Gloucestershire; 168/8 (20 overs)	v	Glamorgan; 172/4 (18.5 overs)
Kieran Noema-Barnett 37 (22); Dale Steyn 2/21 (4 overs)		Colin Ingram 64 (30); Benny Howell

Glamorgan won by 6 wickets
County Ground, Bristol
Umpires: Neil Bainton and David Millns
Player of the match: Colin Ingram (Glam)

- Glamorgan won the toss and elected to field.
- Points: Glamorgan 2, Gloucestershire 0.

15 June
Scorecard

Somerset	v	Glamorgan

Match abandoned without a ball bowled
County Ground, Taunton
Umpires: Neil Mallender and Tim Robinson

- No toss.
- Points: Somerset 1, Glamorgan 1.

17 June
Scorecard

Glamorgan; 175/4 (16 overs)	v	Kent; 121 (15.5 overs)
David Lloyd 97* (49); Mitchell Claydon 2/27 (3 overs)		Matt Coles 31 (17); Dale Steyn 4/18 (4 overs)

Glamorgan won by 55 runs (D/L method)
Sophia Gardens, Cardiff
Umpires: Jeff Evans and Billy Taylor
Player of the match: David Lloyd (Glam)

- Kent won the toss and elected to field.
- Rain reduced the match to 16 overs-a-side.
- Points: Glamorgan 2, Kent 0.

24 June
Scorecard

Surrey; 110 (19.2 overs)	v	Glamorgan; 114/1 (15.5 overs)
Rory Burns 22 (19); Graham Wagg 1/5 (1.2 overs)		Colin Ingram 73* (49); Sam Curran 1/18 (3 overs)

Glamorgan won by 9 wickets
Sophia Gardens, Cardiff
Umpires: Rob Bailey and Stephen Gale
Player of the match: Dean Cosker (Glam)

- Surrey won the toss and elected to bat.
- Points: Glamorgan 2, Surrey 0.

7 July
Scorecard

Glamorgan; 159/8 (20 overs)	v	Sussex; 113 (18.3 overs)
David Lloyd 81 (55); Nuwan Kulasekara 4/28 (4 overs)		Matt Machan 20 (17); Timm van der Gugten 4/17 (4 overs)

Glamorgan won by 46 runs
Sophia Gardens, Cardiff
Umpires: Billy Taylor and Mike Burns
Player of the match: David Lloyd (Glam)

- Sussex won the toss and elected to field.
- Points: Glamorgan 2, Sussex 0.

8 July
Scorecard

Middlesex; 144/8 (20 overs)	v	Glamorgan; 145/1 (16.3 overs)
Eoin Morgan 58 (48); Timm van der Gugten 2/13 (3 overs)		Mark Wallace 69* (50); Nathan Sowter 1/22 (3 overs)

Glamorgan won by 9 wickets
Old Deer Park, Richmond
Umpires: Ian Gould and Martin Saggers
Player of the match: Mark Wallace (Glam)

- Glamorgan won the toss and elected to field.
- Points: Glamorgan 2, Middlesex 0.

10 July
Scorecard

Glamorgan; 119/6 (20 overs)	v	Gloucestershire; 120/1 (16.1 overs)
Graham Wagg 32* (23); Graeme van Buuren 3/19 (4 overs)		Michael Klinger 56* (51); Timm van der Gugten 1/17 (2 overs)

Gloucestershire won by 9 wickets
Sophia Gardens, Cardiff
Umpires: Jeremy Lloyds and Nigel Cowley
Player of the match: Michael Klinger (Glos)

- Glamorgan won the toss and elected to bat.
- Points: Gloucestershire 2, Glamorgan 0.

14 July
Scorecard

Hampshire; 167/6 (20 overs)	v	Glamorgan; 142/7 (20 overs)
Liam Dawson 76* (54); Graham Wagg 3/38 (4 overs)		Mark Wallace 45 (34); Liam Dawson 4/23 (4 overs)

Hampshire won by 25 runs
Rose Bowl, Southampton
Umpires: Nigel Llong and Russell Evans
Player of the match: Liam Dawson (Hants)

- Glamorgan won the toss and elected to field.
- Points: Hampshire 2, Glamorgan 0.

22 July
Scorecard

Somerset; 152 (19.3 overs)	v	Glamorgan; 156/3 (18 overs)
James Hildreth 39 (28); Colin Ingram 3/20 (4 overs)		Colin Ingram 54 (37); Peter Trego 1/8 (1 over)

Glamorgan won by 7 wickets
Sophia Gardens, Cardiff
Umpires: Richard Illingworth and Steve O'Shaughnessy
Player of the match: Colin Ingram (Glam)

- Glamorgan won the toss and elected to field.
- Points: Glamorgan 2, Somerset 0.

28 July
Scorecard

Glamorgan; 101 (13.2 overs)	v	Sussex; 30/1 (4.1 overs)
Michael Hogan 13 (10); George Garton 4/16 (3 overs)		Chris Nash 10 (9); Shaun Tait 1/13 (2 overs)

No result
County Ground, Hove
Umpires: Peter Hartley and Stephen Gale

- Sussex won the toss and elected to field.
- Rain prevented any play after 4.1 overs of the Sussex innings.
- Points: Glamorgan 1, Sussex 1.

29 July
Scorecard

Glamorgan; 184/5 (20 overs)	v	Essex
Colin Ingram 101 (56); David Masters 1/16 (4 overs)

No result
County Ground, Chelmsford
Umpires: Nigel Cowley and Tim Robinson

- Essex won the toss and elected to field.
- Rain prevented any play after the Glamorgan innings.
- Nick Selman (Glam) made his T20 debut.
- Points: Glamorgan 1, Essex 1.

=== Quarter-final ===
11 August
Scorecard

Yorkshire; 180/8 (20 overs)	v	Glamorgan; 90 (13 overs)
David Willey 79 (38); Colin Ingram 4/32 (4 overs)		Jacques Rudolph 26 (25); Adil Rashid 4/26 (3 overs)

Yorkshire won by 90 runs
Sophia Gardens, Cardiff
Umpires: David Millns and Nick Cook
Player of the match: David Willey (Yorks)

- Yorkshire won the toss and elected to bat.

== Pre-season and friendlies ==
25 March
Scorecard
Report

Gloucestershire; 131 (39.2 overs)	v	Glamorgan; 134/3 (20.4 overs)
Miles Hammond 42 (77); David Lloyd 3/26 (6.2 overs)		Will Bragg 45* (49); Oliver Currill 1/21 (4 overs)

Glamorgan won by 7 wickets
Sophia Gardens, Cardiff
Umpires: D Price and R Thomas

- Glamorgan won the toss and elected to field.
- Both sides were able to name up to 13 players in their squads, 11 batting and 11 fielding.

29 March
Scorecard
Report

Glamorgan; 162/2 (31 overs)	v	Cardiff MCCU
Jacques Rudolph 44 (54); Dan Lewis-Williams 2/26 (5 overs)

No result
Sophia Gardens, Cardiff
Umpires: C Evans and J Furnham

- Cardiff MCCU won the toss and elected to field.
- Both sides were able to name up to 13 players in their squads, 11 batting and 11 fielding.

31 March – 2 April
Scorecard

Somerset	v	Glamorgan
323/7d (63 overs); Jim Allenby 131* (118); Graham Wagg 2/22 (10 overs)		286/8d (75.4 overs); James Kettleborough 100* (219); Max Waller 3/75 (10.4 overs)
188 (45 overs); Ryan Davies 70 (75); Graham Wagg 5/50 (13 overs)		195/7 (46 overs); Will Bragg 84 (124); Tim Groenewald 3/36 (8 overs)

Match drawn
Sophia Gardens, Cardiff

- Somerset won the toss and elected to bat.

11–13 April
Scorecard

Glamorgan	v	Cardiff MCCU
533/7d (107 overs); Aneurin Donald 105 (125); Alex Thomson 2/45 (13.4 overs)		166/1d (58 overs); Jeremy Lawlor 77 (169); David Lloyd 1/40 (12 overs)

Match drawn
Sophia Gardens, Cardiff
Umpires: Ian Blackwell and Alex Wharf

- Glamorgan won the toss and elected to bat.
- No play was possible on day 1 due to rain.
- Richard Edwards (Cardiff MCCU) made his first-class debut.

15 July (D/N)
Scorecard

Pakistan A 327/9 (50 overs)	v	Glamorgan; 204 (45.2 overs)
Babar Azam 119 (109); Ruaidhri Smith 4/76 (10 overs)		Will Bragg 61 (67); Babar Azam 2/20 (2.2 overs)

Pakistan A won by 123 runs
Spytty Park, Newport
Umpires: Ben Debenham and Peter Hartley

- Glamorgan won the toss and elected to field.
- Owen Morgan, Cameron Herring, Jack Murphy, Kiran Carlson, Nick Selman and Tom Smith (all Glam) made their List A debuts.
- Ruaidhri Smith (Glam) took a hat-trick with the wickets of Bilawal Bhatti, Mohammad Nawaz and Mohammad Asghar.

== Statistics ==
=== Batting ===
First-class
Player	Matches	Innings	NO	Runs	HS	Ave	SR	100	50	0	4s	6s
Will Bragg	17	32	1	1,126	161*	36.32	49.88	2	8	4	132	0
Aneurin Donald	17	31	1	1,088	234	36.26	75.71	2	5	1	146	17
David Lloyd	16	28	1	817	107	30.25	61.66	3	2	5	118	6
Graham Wagg	14	23	3	736	106	36.80	62.79	1	5	1	85	13
Jacques Rudolph	16	30	2	688	87	24.57	42.10	0	3	4	101	0
Mark Wallace	15	27	5	669	78	30.40	65.33	0	6	6	92	2
Craig Meschede	14	23	5	491	78	27.27	75.65	0	4	6	66	11
Nick Selman	10	19	2	470	122*	27.64	46.67	2	2	4	53	0
Chris Cooke	8	14	2	465	63	38.75	53.81	0	3	0	65	0
Owen Morgan	9	17	3	406	103*	29.00	43.79	1	1	2	60	1
Source: ESPNcricinfo

List A
Player	Matches	Innings	NO	Runs	HS	Ave	SR	100	50	0	4s	6s
Colin Ingram	8	7	1	367	107	61.16	126.55	1	2	1	19	19
Will Bragg	9	8	0	321	75	40.12	90.93	0	3	0	31	3
David Lloyd	8	7	0	253	65	36.14	93.01	0	2	1	36	1
Jacques Rudolph	8	7	1	233	53	38.83	67.14	0	1	0	22	2
Graham Wagg	8	7	0	152	52	21.71	107.04	0	1	2	13	3
Chris Cooke	4	4	0	150	80	37.50	113.63	0	1	0	10	5
Andrew Salter	6	6	2	111	51	27.75	92.50	0	1	1	3	6
Aneurin Donald	8	7	0	109	53	15.57	77.30	0	1	0	8	1
Timm van der Gugten	5	5	2	71	21	23.66	112.69	0	0	0	9	1
Craig Meschede	8	7	1	70	45	11.66	79.54	0	0	1	9	1
Source: ESPNcricinfo

Twenty20
Player	Matches	Innings	NO	Runs	HS	Ave	SR	100	50	0	4s	6s
Colin Ingram	14	14	2	502	101	41.83	164.59	1	4	0	42	29
David Lloyd	14	14	1	382	97*	29.38	129.49	0	2	2	47	8
Aneurin Donald	14	12	3	235	55	26.11	128.41	0	2	2	27	7
Jacques Rudolph	14	13	3	210	40*	21.00	99.05	0	0	1	19	2
Mark Wallace	8	8	1	180	69*	25.71	108.43	0	1	1	19	1
Graham Wagg	14	10	4	91	32*	15.16	101.11	0	0	0	6	2
Chris Cooke	6	4	2	65	24*	32.50	118.18	0	0	0	4	3
Craig Meschede	14	7	1	48	17	8.00	81.35	0	0	0	2	2
Timm van der Gugten	14	5	2	35	13	11.66	152.17	0	0	1	5	1
Michael Hogan	13	3	1	28	13	14.00	133.33	0	0	0	2	2
Andrew Salter	6	4	2	28	16*	14.00	112.00	0	0	0	1	1
Source: ESPNcricinfo

=== Bowling ===
First-class
Player	Matches	Innings	Overs	Maidens	Runs	Wickets	BBI	BBM	Ave	Econ	SR	5w	10w
Timm van der Gugten	14	23	461.0	74	1,485	56	5/52	9/133	26.51	3.22	49.39	5	0
Michael Hogan	16	27	512.4	140	1,322	49	5/36	6/106	26.97	2.57	62.77	2	0
Graham Wagg	14	22	434.0	73	1,426	37	5/90	7/127	38.54	3.28	70.37	1	0
Craig Meschede	14	23	360.5	67	1,199	27	5/84	6/162	44.40	3.32	80.18	1	0
Lukas Carey	3	6	84.4	13	330	13	4/92	7/151	25.38	3.89	39.07	0	0
Owen Morgan	9	15	232.0	34	740	13	2/37	3/57	56.92	3.18	107.07	0	0
David Lloyd	16	20	161.1	20	623	11	3/36	3/53	56.63	3.86	87.90	0	0
Andrew Salter	7	12	136.0	13	492	7	3/56	4/137	70.28	3.61	116.57	0	0
Kiran Carlson	4	7	45.0	7	178	6	5/28	5/78	29.66	3.95	45.00	1	0
Harry Podmore	2	4	54.3	5	225	6	3/59	4/123	37.50	4.12	54.50	0	0
Source: ESPNcricinfo

List A
Player	Matches	Innings	Overs	Maidens	Runs	Wickets	BBI	Ave	Econ	SR	4w	5w
Graham Wagg	8	8	65.1	2	411	11	2/48	37.36	6.30	35.54	0	0
Michael Hogan	8	8	71.4	1	430	11	4/41	39.09	6.00	39.09	1	0
Timm van der Gugten	5	5	47.1	2	304	7	3/33	43.42	6.44	40.42	0	0
Craig Meschede	8	8	65.0	1	337	7	2/30	48.14	5.18	55.71	0	0
Colin Ingram	8	7	33.0	0	165	6	3/38	27.50	5.00	33.00	0	0
Ruaidhri Smith	2	2	13.0	1	108	4	4/76	27.00	8.30	19.50	1	0
Owen Morgan	2	2	12.0	1	67	2	2/49	33.50	5.58	36.00	0	0
Dean Cosker	4	4	28.0	0	181	2	2/45	90.50	6.46	84.00	0	0
Andrew Salter	6	6	34.0	0	205	2	1/38	102.50	6.02	102.00	0	0
Dewi Penrhyn Jones	1	1	10.0	0	75	1	1/75	75.00	7.50	60.00	0	0
Source: ESPNcricinfo

Twenty20
Player	Matches	Innings	Overs	Maidens	Runs	Wickets	BBI	Ave	Econ	SR	4w	5w
Timm van der Gugten	14	13	39.0	2	268	19	4/14	14.10	6.87	12.31	2	0
Michael Hogan	13	13	40.3	0	276	16	4/28	17.25	6.81	15.18	1	0
Graham Wagg	14	12	31.1	0	265	13	3/38	20.38	8.50	14.38	0	0
Dale Steyn	5	5	18.3	0	113	11	4/18	10.27	6.10	10.09	1	0
Craig Meschede	14	11	28.1	0	207	9	2/16	23.00	7.34	18.77	0	0
Colin Ingram	14	7	21.0	1	163	9	4/32	18.11	7.76	14.00	1	0
Dean Cosker	9	8	24.2	0	166	8	2/19	20.75	6.82	18.25	0	0
Shaun Tait	8	7	19.0	0	153	6	2/17	25.50	8.05	19.00	0	0
Source: ESPNcricinfo
