= Glamorgan County Cricket Club in 2017 =

Welsh cricket club season

Glamorgan County Cricket Club
2017 season
- Coach: (Wales) Robert Croft
- Captain: (South Africa) Jacques Rudolph (until 24 May) (Australia) Michael Hogan (from 24 May)
- Overseas player: (South Africa) Jacques Rudolph (South Africa) David Miller (T20 Blast)
- Ground(s): Sophia Gardens, Cardiff; St Helen's Ground, Swansea; Penrhyn Avenue, Rhos-on-Sea
- County Championship: 7th, Division Two
- One-Day Cup: 4th, South Group
- T20 Blast: Semi-finals
- Most runs: FC: Nick Selman (902); LA: Colin Ingram (564); T20: Colin Ingram (462)
- Most wickets: FC: Michael Hogan (52); LA: Marchant de Lange (18); T20: Michael Hogan (20)
- Most catches: FC: Nick Selman (16); LA: Colin Ingram (3); T20: Aneurin Donald (9)
- Most wicket-keeping dismissals: FC: Chris Cooke (40 ct + 0 st); LA: Chris Cooke (11 ct + 0 st); T20: Chris Cooke (7 ct + 0 st)

The 2017 season was Glamorgan County Cricket Club's 130th year of existence and its 97th as a first-class cricket county. In 2017, Glamorgan played in the Second Division of the County Championship, and the South Groups of both the 50-over One-Day Cup and the T20 Blast. It was the second season in charge for head coach Robert Croft. Overseas player Jacques Rudolph started the season as club captain, but relinquished the role to bowler Michael Hogan in May 2017 after announcing he would be retiring at the end of the season. Unlike other counties, Glamorgan competed in limited-overs cricket without a nickname for the fifth year in a row.

The most notable departure for Glamorgan over the winter was former captain and wicket-keeper Mark Wallace, who announced his retirement prior to the start of the season at the age of 35. Other departures included batter James Kettleborough and bowler Dewi Penrhyn Jones, while Owen Morgan, Lukas Carey, Kiran Carlson and Jack Murphy all signed their first contracts with the club. South African fast bowler Marchant de Lange was the club's marquee signing for the 2017 season, arriving on a three-year contract as a non-overseas player thanks to his wife's UK passport, while fellow South African batter David Miller was brought in on a six-game contract to play in the T20 Blast. Middlesex bowler Harry Podmore also joined Glamorgan on a one-month loan at the start of the season after a spell with the Welsh county the previous year.

== Squad ==
- No. denotes the player's squad number, as worn on the back of their shirt.
- ‡ denotes players with international caps.
- * denotes a player who has been awarded a county cap.
- Ages given as of the first day of the County Championship season, 7 April 2017.

No.	Name	Nationality	Birth date	Batting style	Bowling style	Notes
Batsmen
4	Jacques Rudolph ‡	South Africa	4 May 1981 (aged 35)	Left-handed	Right arm leg break	Overseas player; club captain until 24 May
6	Jeremy Lawlor	Wales	4 November 1995 (aged 21)	Right-handed	Right arm off break	
9	Nick Selman	Australia	18 October 1995 (aged 21)	Right-handed	Right arm medium	
12	Aneurin Donald	Wales	20 December 1996 (aged 20)	Right-handed	Right arm off break	
41	Colin Ingram	South Africa	3 July 1985 (aged 31)	Left-handed	—	Kolpak registration; occasional wicket-keeper
—	Connor Brown	Wales	3 July 1985 (aged 31)	Right-handed	Right arm off break	
—	Kiran Carlson	Wales	16 May 1998 (aged 18)	Right-handed	Right arm medium/off break	
—	David Miller	South Africa	10 June 1989 (aged 27)	Left-handed	Right arm off break	Twenty20 only; occasional wicket-keeper
All-rounders
7	Jack Murphy	Wales	15 July 1995 (aged 21)	Left-handed	Left arm fast-medium	
8	Graham Wagg	England	28 April 1983 (aged 33)	Right-handed	Left arm medium	
14	David Lloyd	Wales	15 June 1992 (aged 24)	Right-handed	Right arm off break	
20	Ruaidhri Smith	Scotland	5 August 1994 (aged 22)	Right-handed	Right arm medium	
44	Craig Meschede	South Africa	21 November 1991 (aged 25)	Right-handed	Right arm medium-fast	
—	Owen Morgan	Wales	14 April 1994 (aged 22)	Right-handed	Slow left-arm orthodox	
Wicket-keepers
22	Will Bragg	Wales	24 October 1986 (aged 30)	Left-handed	—	
46	Chris Cooke*	South Africa	30 May 1986 (aged 30)	Right-handed	—	
—	Tom Cullen	Australia	3 July 1985 (aged 31)	Right-handed	—	
Bowlers
11	Kieran Bull	Wales	5 April 1995 (aged 22)	Right-handed	Right arm off break	
21	Andrew Salter	Wales	1 June 1993 (aged 23)	Right-handed	Right arm off break	
31	Michael Hogan	Australia	31 May 1981 (aged 35)	Right-handed	Right arm fast-medium	Club captain from 24 May
64	Timm van der Gugten	Netherlands	25 February 1991 (aged 26)	Right-handed	Right arm fast-medium	
—	Lukas Carey	Wales	17 July 1997 (aged 19)	Right-handed	Right arm fast-medium	
—	Marchant de Lange	South Africa	13 October 1990 (aged 26)	Right-handed	Right arm fast	
—	Harry Podmore	England	23 July 1994 (aged 22)	Right-handed	Right arm medium	One-month loan from Middlesex

== County Championship ==
In 2017, Glamorgan played in Division Two of the County Championship.

=== Standings ===
Team	Pld	W	L	T	D	A	Bat	Bowl	Ded	Pts
Worcestershire (P)	14	9	3	0	2	0	45	39	0	238
Nottinghamshire (P)	14	7	2	0	5	0	44	41	0	222
Northamptonshire	14	9	3	0	2	0	29	39	5	217
Sussex	14	7	5	0	2	0	35	39	0	196
Kent	14	4	2	0	7	1	35	36	0	175
Gloucestershire	14	3	4	0	7	0	29	35	0	147
Glamorgan	14	3	7	0	4	0	25	40	0	133
Derbyshire	14	3	7	0	3	1	29	30	0	127
Durham	14	3	6	0	5	0	36	37	48	98
Leicestershire	14	0	9	0	5	0	32	34	16	75

Source: CricInfo

- Worcestershire and Nottinghamshire were promoted to Division One
- Durham were deducted 48 points by the ECB for accepting a financial aid package during the 2016 season.
- Leicestershire were deducted 16 points by the ECB for a breach in player conduct.
- Northamptonshire were deducted five points for a slow over rate against Nottinghamshire in August.

=== Matches ===
==== Northamptonshire v Glamorgan (7–8 April) ====
7–8 April
Scorecard

Glamorgan	v	Northamptonshire
101 (31.3 overs); Aneurin Donald 34 (53); Ben Sanderson 3/20 (11.3 overs)		310 (78.1 overs); Rory Kleinveldt 86 (58); Lukas Carey 4/85 (23 overs)
187 (65.3 overs); Colin Ingram 47 (107); Ben Sanderson 4/31 (19 overs)

Northamptonshire won by an innings and 22 runs
County Ground, Northampton
Umpires: Steve Garratt and Tim Robinson

- Glamorgan won the toss and elected to bat.
- Points: Northamptonshire 22, Glamorgan 3.

==== Glamorgan v Worcestershire (14–16 April) ====
14–16 April
Scorecard

Glamorgan	v	Worcestershire
207 (40.4 overs); David Lloyd 88 (103); John Hastings 3/57 (11 overs)		403 (94.1 overs); Tom Kohler-Cadmore 102 (159); Michael Hogan 3/78 (25 overs)
223 (62.5 overs); Aneurin Donald 57 (65); Josh Tongue 5/45 (10 overs)		28/2 (5.3 overs); Tom Fell 15* (11); Lukas Carey 1/13 (2.3 overs)

Worcestershire won by 8 wickets
Sophia Gardens, Cardiff
Umpires: Neil Bainton and Steve O'Shaughnessy

- No toss.
- Points: Worcestershire 24, Glamorgan 4.

==== Leicestershire v Glamorgan (21–24 April) ====
21–24 April
Scorecard

Leicestershire	v	Glamorgan
420 (115.1 overs); Harry Dearden 87 (211); Lukas Carey 4/127 (31 overs)		426 (108.5 overs); Colin Ingram 137 (230); Ben Raine 4/105 (30.5 overs)
360/6d (88 overs); Mark Pettini 110* (169); Marchant de Lange 3/77 (19 overs)		144/4 (46 overs); Aneurin Donald 66* (103); Ben Raine 2/23 (7 overs)

Match drawn
Grace Road, Leicestershire
Umpires: Graham Lloyd and Nick Cook

- No toss.
- Points: Glamorgan 13, Leicestershire 12.

==== Glamorgan v Nottinghamshire (19–22 May) ====
19–22 May
Scorecard

Nottinghamshire	v	Glamorgan
448 (126 overs); Riki Wessels 120 (136); Timm van der Gugten 5/101 (32 overs)		187 (62.3 overs); Aneurin Donald 53 (76); Luke Fletcher 3/60 (16 overs)
		420/5d (f/o) (171 overs); Colin Ingram 155* (427); Luke Fletcher 2/73 (25 overs)

Match drawn
Sophia Gardens, Cardiff
Umpires: Ian Blackwell and Rob Bailey

- Nottinghamshire won the toss and elected to bat.
- Points: Nottinghamshire 12, Glamorgan 7.

==== Glamorgan v Durham (26–29 May) ====
26–29 May
Scorecard

Durham	v	Glamorgan
342 (94 overs); Paul Collingwood 127 (174); Michael Hogan 5/49 (22 overs)		353 (92 overs); Andrew Salter 75 (131); Paul Coughlin 4/87 (23 overs)
276/7d (76 overs); Paul Collingwood 92* (145); Andrew Salter 2/46 (13 overs)		266/7 (50.3 overs); Nick Selman 116* (129); George Harding 4/111 (19 overs)

Glamorgan won by 3 wickets
St Helen's, Swansea
Umpires: Paul Baldwin and Russell Evans

- Durham won the toss and elected to bat.
- George Harding (Durham) made his first-class debut.
- Points: Glamorgan 23, Durham 6.

==== Worcestershire v Glamorgan (9–11 June) ====
9–11 June
Scorecard

Worcestershire	v	Glamorgan
267 (70.4 overs); Ben Cox 93 (99); Timm van der Gugten 4/66 (19 overs)		381 (101.5 overs); Jacques Rudolph 111 (209); Josh Tongue 6/97 (25 overs)
129 (46.3 overs); Tom Fell 33 (87); Michael Hogan 5/38 (14.3 overs)		18/1 (8.5 overs); Jacques Rudolph 11* (18); Ed Barnard 1/6 (4 overs)

Glamorgan won by 9 wickets
New Road, Worcester
Umpires: Michael Gough and Mike Burns

- No toss.
- Points: Glamorgan 23, Worcestershire 5.

==== Durham v Glamorgan (19–22 June) ====
19–22 June
Scorecard

Glamorgan	v	Durham
295 (115.5 overs); Nick Selman 103 (252); Chris Rushworth 5/52 (25 overs)		402 (110.1 overs); Graham Clark 109 (135); Marchant de Lange 5/95 (31 overs)
263 (95 overs); Colin Ingram 70* (137); Barry McCarthy 4/65 (25 overs)		158/1 (24.3 overs); Stephen Cook 89* (78); Andrew Salter 1/49 (5.3 overs)

Durham won by 9 wickets
Riverside Ground, Chester-le-Street
Umpires: Martin Saggers and Stephen Gale

- Glamorgan won the toss and elected to bat.
- Points: Durham 23, Glamorgan 5.

==== Glamorgan v Derbyshire (26–29 June) ====
26–29 June (D/N)
Scorecard

Derbyshire	v	Glamorgan
288 (92 overs); Wayne Madsen 70 (107); Marchant de Lange 3/82 (26 overs)		237 (93.4 overs); Nick Selman 50 (159); Tony Palladino 4/36 (16.4 overs)
160 (44.2 overs); Luis Reece 55 (95); Marchant de Lange 3/53 (11 overs)		172 (69.3 overs); Nick Selman 43 (122); 5/60 (26.3 overs)

Derbyshire won by 39 runs
Sophia Gardens, Cardiff
Umpires: Alex Wharf and Paul Pollard

- Derbyshire won the toss and elected to bat.
- Hamidullah Qadri (Derbs) made his first-class debut.
- Points: Derbyshire 21, Glamorgan 4.

==== Gloucestershire v Glamorgan (3–4 July) ====
3–4 July
Scorecard

Glamorgan	v	Gloucestershire
117 (32.1 overs); Aneurin Donald 39 (41); David Payne 3/37 (9.1 overs)		141 (41.2 overs); Kieran Noema-Barnett 34 (39); Michael Hogan 3/25 (8.2 overs)
158 (55 overs); Andrew Salter 31 (77); Liam Norwell 6/38 (18 overs)		137/0 (31.3 overs); Chris Dent 68* (99)

Gloucestershire won by 10 wickets
College Ground, Cheltenham
Umpires: Neil Bainton and Russell Evans

- Gloucestershire won the toss and elected to field.
- Points: Gloucestershire 19, Glamorgan 3.

==== Glamorgan v Sussex (28–30 August) ====
28–30 August
Scorecard

Glamorgan	v	Sussex
294 (75.3 overs); Craig Meschede 87 (96); Ollie Robinson 4/46 (18.3 overs)		268 (59.5 overs); Ben Brown 77 (95); Craig Meschede 4/61 (17.5 overs)
182 (58.3 overs); Craig Meschede 41 (70); Chris Jordan 5/46 (16.3 overs)		211/9 (54.4 overs); Chris Nash 68 (105); Lukas Carey 3/40 (14 overs)

Sussex won by 1 wicket
Penrhyn Avenue, Rhos-on-Sea
Umpires: Graham Lloyd and Tim Robinson

- No toss.
- Points: Sussex 21, Glamorgan 5.

==== Derbyshire v Glamorgan (5–8 September) ====
5–8 September
Scorecard

Derbyshire	v	Glamorgan
236/9 (72 overs); Luis Reece 53 (93); Lukas Carey 3/49 (17 overs)

Match drawn
County Ground, Derby
Umpires: Billy Taylor and Graham Lloyd

- No toss.
- No play was possible on days 1, 2 or 4 due to rain.
- Play on day 3 was reduced to 72 overs due to rain.
- Points: Glamorgan 8, Derbyshire 6.

==== Glamorgan v Northamptonshire (12–15 September) ====
12–15 September
Scorecard

Glamorgan	v	Northamptonshire
207 (64.1 overs); Andrew Salter 59 (122); Richard Gleeson 5/60 (19.1 overs)		310 (78.1 overs); Richard Levi 101 (97); Michael Hogan 4/58 (22 overs)
320 (94.1 overs); Chris Cooke 69 (116); Richard Gleeson 3/71 (24.1 overs)		221/3 (58.4 overs); Simon Kerrigan 62 (101); Michael Hogan 2/36 (14 overs)

Northamptonshire won by 7 wickets
Sophia Gardens, Cardiff
Umpires: David Millns and Stephen Gale

- Glamorgan won the toss and elected to bat.
- Points: Northamptonshire 22, Glamorgan 4.

==== Glamorgan v Gloucestershire (19–22 September) ====
19–22 September
Scorecard

Glamorgan	v	Gloucestershire
442 (117.2 overs); Kiran Carlson 191 (319); Jack Taylor 3/50 (7.2 overs)		399/8d (110 overs); Benny Howell 163 (236); Craig Meschede 3/81 (24 overs)
353/3 (80 overs); Nick Selman 142* (237); David Payne 1/40 (12 overs)

Match drawn
Sophia Gardens, Cardiff
Umpires: Neil Bainton and Paul Pollard

- No toss.
- Points: Glamorgan 11, Gloucestershire 11.

==== Kent v Glamorgan (25–27 September) ====
25–27 September
Scorecard

Kent	v	Glamorgan
302 (81.2 overs); Joe Denly 152 (204); Michael Hogan 4/44 (18.2 overs)		229 (71.3 overs); Chris Cooke 49 (93); Calum Haggett 3/40 (15 overs)
115 (43.2 overs); Adam Rouse 44 (84); Michael Hogan 6/43 (15.2 overs)		192/5 (62.2 overs); Nick Selman 70 (127); Darren Stevens 3/53 (19 overs)

Glamorgan won by 5 wickets
St Lawrence Ground, Canterbury
Umpires: Jeremy Lloyds and Nigel Cowley

- No toss.
- Grant Stewart (Kent) made his first-class debut.
- Sam Billings (Kent) was withdrawn from the game during Kent's second innings after being called up by England for the fourth ODI against the West Indies; he was replaced by Adam Rouse.

== One-Day Cup ==
=== Standings ===
Pos	Team	Pld	W	L	T	NR	Ded	Pts	NRR
1	Essex (Note: advanced directly to the semi-finals)	8	7	1	0	0	0	14	0.882
2	Somerset (Note: advanced to the quarter-finals)	8	5	2	0	1	0	11	0.543
3	Surrey	8	4	3	0	1	0	9	0.101
4	Glamorgan	8	4	4	0	0	0	8	−0.660
5	Sussex	8	3	3	0	2	0	8	0.535
6	Hampshire	8	3	4	0	1	0	7	−0.109
7	Gloucestershire	8	3	4	0	1	0	7	−0.435
8	Middlesex	8	2	4	0	2	0	6	−0.243
9	Kent	8	1	7	0	0	0	2	−0.409

Source: BBC Sport

=== Matches ===
==== Gloucestershire v Glamorgan (27 April) ====
27 April
Scorecard

Glamorgan; 277/7 (50 overs)	v	Gloucestershire; 232/8 (44 overs)
Jacques Rudolph 121 (143); Chris Liddle 2/51 (10 overs)		Michael Klinger 78 (84); Colin Ingram 3/39 (7 overs)

Glamorgan won by 18 runs (D/L method)
County Ground, Bristol
Umpires: Mike Burns and Russell Evans

- Gloucestershire won the toss and elected to field.
- Rain reduced the Gloucestershire innings to 44 overs.
- Lukas Carey (Glam) made his List A debut.
- Points: Glamorgan 2, Gloucestershire 0.

==== Glamorgan v Surrey (30 April) ====
30 April
Scorecard

Glamorgan; 239 (48.3 overs)	v	Surrey; 183/2 (24 overs)
Colin Ingram 72 (96); Jade Dernbach 3/30 (9 overs)		Kumar Sangakkara 81* (69); Lukas Carey 1/33 (4 overs)

Surrey won by 8 wickets (D/L method)
Sophia Gardens, Cardiff
Umpires: Ian Blackwell and Jeremy Lloyds

- Surrey won the toss and elected to field.
- Rain reduced the Surrey innings to 29 overs.
- Points: Surrey 2, Glamorgan 0.

==== Sussex v Glamorgan (2 May) ====
2 May
Scorecard

Sussex; 292/6 (50 overs)	v	Glamorgan; 221 (40 overs)
Stiaan van Zyl 96 (88); Marchant de Lange 3/51 (10 overs)		Chris Cooke 62 (47); Danny Briggs 3/53 (8 overs)

Sussex won by 59 runs (D/L method)
County Ground, Hove
Umpires: David Millns and Nick Cook

- Sussex won the toss and elected to bat.
- Rain reduced the Glamorgan innings to 43 overs.

==== Glamorgan v Somerset (5 May) ====
5 May
Scorecard

Somerset; 338/3 (50 overs)	v	Glamorgan; 168 (36.4 overs)
Jim Allenby 144* (146); Michael Hogan 1/45 (10 overs)		Kiran Carlson 63 (59); Roelof van der Merwe 3/21 (5.4 overs)

Somerset won by 170 runs
Sophia Gardens, Cardiff
Umpires: Russell Warren and Steve O'Shaughnessy

- Glamorgan won the toss and elected to field.
- Points: Somerset 2, Glamorgan 0.

==== Glamorgan v Essex (7 May) ====
7 May
Scorecard

Glamorgan; 281/7 (50 overs)	v	Essex; 280/9 (50 overs)
Colin Ingram 142 (130); Neil Wagner 4/58 (10 overs)		Varun Chopra 124 (138); Michael Hogan 2/42 (10 overs)

Glamorgan won by 1 run
Sophia Gardens, Cardiff
Umpires: Jeremy Lloyds and Mike Burns

- Glamorgan won the toss and elected to bat.
- Points: Glamorgan 2, Essex 0.

==== Middlesex v Glamorgan (10 May) ====
10 May
Scorecard

Middlesex; 243 (48.4 overs)	v	Glamorgan; 227 (48.3 overs)
James Franklin 54 (75); Colin Ingram 4/39 (10 overs)		Colin Ingram 53 (57); Steven Finn 4/39 (10 overs)

Middlesex won by 16 runs
Brunton Memorial Ground, Radlett
Umpires: Martin Saggers and Stephen Gale

- Middlesex won the toss and elected to bat.
- Points: Middlesex 2, Glamorgan 0.

==== Hampshire v Glamorgan (12 May) ====
12 May
Scorecard

Hampshire; 332/6 (49 overs)	v	Glamorgan; 334/7 (48.5 overs)
James Vince 178 (138); Marchant de Lange 5/49 (9 overs)		Colin Ingram 115 (78); Mason Crane 3/69 (10 overs)

Glamorgan won by 3 wickets
Rose Bowl, Southampton
Umpires: Martin Saggers and Stephen Gale

- Glamorgan won the toss and elected to field.
- Rain reduced the match to 49 overs-a-side.
- Points: Glamorgan 2, Hampshire 0.

==== Glamorgan v Kent (14 May) ====
14 May
Scorecard

Glamorgan; 356/7 (50 overs)	v	Kent; 341 (47.2 overs)
Colin Ingram 114 (98); Matt Coles 2/32 (9 overs)		Darren Stevens 147 (67); David Lloyd 5/53 (10 overs)

Glamorgan won by 15 runs
St Helen's, Swansea
Umpires: Michael Gough and Nigel Cowley

- Kent won the toss and elected to field.
- Points: Glamorgan 2, Kent 0.

== T20 Blast ==
=== Group stage ===
==== Standings ====
Pos	Team	Pld	W	L	T	NR	Ded	Pts	NRR
1	Glamorgan	14	7	3	0	4	0	18	0.045
2	Surrey	14	7	5	0	2	0	16	−0.130
3	Hampshire	14	7	6	0	1	0	15	−0.021
4	Somerset	14	6	6	0	2	0	14	0.491
5	Sussex Sharks	14	5	5	1	3	0	14	0.423
6	Kent Spitfires	14	6	7	1	0	0	13	−0.158
7	Middlesex	14	5	7	1	1	0	12	0.221
8	Essex Eagles	14	5	7	0	2	0	12	−0.204
9	Gloucestershire	14	4	6	1	3	0	12	−0.648

Source: BBC Sport

==== Glamorgan v Hampshire (7 July) ====
7 July (N)
Scorecard

Hampshire; 167/5 (20 overs)	v	Glamorgan; 145/9 (20 overs)
Lewis McManus 59 (35); Michael Hogan 2/25 (4 overs)		Graham Wagg 50 (28); Shahid Afridi 4/20 (4 overs)

Hampshire won by 22 runs
Sophia Gardens, Cardiff
Umpires: Russell Evans and Tom Lungley
Player of the match: Lewis McManus (Hants)

- Glamorgan won the toss and elected to field.
- Kiran Carlson (Glam) made his T20 debut.
- Points: Hampshire 2, Glamorgan 0.

==== Sussex v Glamorgan (9 July) ====
9 July
Scorecard

Glamorgan; 198/3 (20 overs)	v	Sussex; 180/6 (20 overs)
Colin Ingram 101* (47); Danny Briggs 1/28 (4 overs)		Luke Wright 101 (53); Michael Hogan 2/22 (4 overs)

Glamorgan won by 18 runs
Arundel Castle Cricket Ground, Arundel
Umpires: Billy Taylor and Martin Saggers
Player of the match: Colin Ingram (Glam)

- Sussex won the toss and elected to field.
- Points: Glamorgan 2, Sussex 0.

==== Glamorgan v Somerset (15 July) ====
15 July (N)
Scorecard

Glamorgan; 171/5 (17.2 overs)	v	Somerset
Jacques Rudolph 65* (37); Tim Groenewald 2/31 (3.2 overs)

No result
Sophia Gardens, Cardiff
Umpires: Graham Lloyd and Tim Robinson

- Somerset won the toss and elected to field.
- Rain stopped play after 17.2 overs of the Glamorgan innings.
- Points: Glamorgan 1, Somerset 1.

==== Essex v Glamorgan (16 July) ====
16 July
Scorecard

Essex; 219/4 (20 overs)	v	Glamorgan; 224/5 (20 overs)
Varun Chopra 103* (59); Michael Hogan 2/42 (4 overs)		Colin Ingram 114 (55); Ravi Bopara 1/33 (4 overs)

Glamorgan won by 5 wickets
County Ground, Chelmsford
Umpires: Michael Gough and Russell Warren
Player of the match: Colin Ingram (Glam)

- Essex won the toss and elected to bat.
- Points: Glamorgan 2, Essex 0.

==== Glamorgan v Sussex (21 July) ====
21 July (N)
Scorecard

Sussex; 87/2 (8 overs)	v	Glamorgan
Ross Taylor 40* (19); Marchant de Lange 2/25 (2 overs)

No result
Sophia Gardens, Cardiff
Umpires: Jeff Evans and Russell Warren

- Glamorgan won the toss and elected to field.
- Rain stopped play after 8 overs of the Sussex innings.
- Points: Glamorgan 1, Sussex 1.

==== Glamorgan v Essex (23 July) ====
23 July
Scorecard

Glamorgan	v	Essex

Match abandoned without a ball bowled
Sophia Gardens, Cardiff
Umpires: Alex Wharf and Ben Debenham

- No toss.
- No play was possible due to rain.
- Points: Glamorgan 1, Essex 1.

==== Gloucestershire v Glamorgan (25 July) ====
25 July (N)
Scorecard

Glamorgan; 176/5 (20 overs)	v	Gloucestershire; 151/7 (20 overs)
Jacques Rudolph 51 (46); Thisara Perera 2/25 (4 overs)		Michael Klinger 52 (34); Michael Hogan 2/25 (4 overs)

Glamorgan won by 25 runs
County Ground, Bristol
Umpires: Steve O'Shaughnessy and Tim Robinson
Player of the match: David Miller (Glam)

- Gloucestershire won the toss and elected to field.
- Points: Glamorgan 2, Gloucestershire 0.

==== Glamorgan v Surrey (28 July) ====
28 July (N)
Scorecard

Glamorgan	v	Surrey

Match abandoned without a ball bowled
Sophia Gardens, Cardiff
Umpires: Paul Baldwin and Peter Hartley

- No toss.
- No play was possible due to rain.
- Points: Glamorgan 1, Surrey 1.

==== Kent v Glamorgan (30 July) ====
30 July
Scorecard

Glamorgan; 199/2 (20 overs)	v	Kent; 174/4 (20 overs)
Jacques Rudolph 77* (52); Matt Coles 1/29 (3 overs)		Joe Denly 68 (50); Craig Meschede 1/12 (2 overs)

Glamorgan won by 25 runs
St Lawrence Ground, Canterbury
Umpires: David Millns and Rob Bailey
Player of the match: Jacques Rudolph (Glam)

- Kent won the toss and elected to field.
- Lukas Carey (Glam) made his T20 debut.
- Points: Glamorgan 2, Kent 0.

==== Glamorgan v Gloucestershire (3 August) ====
3 August (N)
Scorecard

Gloucestershire; 150/9 (20 overs)	v	Glamorgan; 32/2 (5 overs)
Phil Mustard 57 (49); Michael Hogan 5/17 (4 overs)		Aneurin Donald 15 (9); David Payne 1/9 (2 overs); Thisara Perera 1/9 (2 overs)

Gloucestershire won by 5 runs (D/L method)
Sophia Gardens, Cardiff
Umpires: Neil Mallender and Steve O'Shaughnessy
Player of the match: Michael Hogan (Glam)

- Glamorgan won the toss and elected to field.
- Rain reduced the Glamorgan innings to 5 overs.
- Points: Gloucestershire 2, Glamorgan 0.

==== Surrey v Glamorgan (4 August) ====
4 August (N)
Scorecard

Glamorgan; 181/6 (20 overs)	v	Surrey; 175/7 (20 overs)
Aneurin Donald 76 (40); Tom Curran 2/25 (4 overs)		Tom Curran 51* (27); Marchant de Lange 3/29 (4 overs)

Glamorgan won by 6 runs
The Oval, London
Umpires: Jeff Evans and Neil Bainton
Player of the match: Aneurin Donald (Glam)

- Glamorgan won the toss and elected to bat.
- Points: Glamorgan 2, Surrey 0.

==== Hampshire v Glamorgan (10 August) ====
10 August (N)
Scorecard

Glamorgan; 118/6 (20 overs)	v	Hampshire; 119/2 (13.5 overs)
Andrew Salter 37* (27); Mason Crane 3/21 (4 overs)		James Vince 60* (41); Colin Ingram 2/29 (4 overs)

Hampshire won by 8 wickets
Rose Bowl, Southampton
Umpires: David Millns and Jeremy Lloyds
Player of the match: Mason Crane (Hants)

- Glamorgan won the toss and elected to bat.
- Calvin Dickinson (Hants) made his T20 debut.
- Points: Hampshire 2, Glamorgan 0.

==== Somerset v Glamorgan (13 August) ====
13 August
Scorecard

Glamorgan; 183/6 (20 overs)	v	Somerset; 182/6 (20 overs)
Nick Selman 66 (42); Craig Overton 2/35 (4 overs)		Johann Myburgh 87 (51); Graham Wagg 2/20 (3 overs)

Hampshire won by 8 wickets
County Ground, Taunton
Umpires: Billy Taylor and Jeff Evans
Player of the match: Marchant de Lange (Glam)

- Somerset won the toss and elected to field.
- Points: Glamorgan 2, Somerset 0.

==== Glamorgan v Middlesex (18 August) ====
18 August (N)
Scorecard

Middlesex; 99/8 (14 overs)	v	Glamorgan; 100/3 (13 overs)
Adam Voges 58* (30); Michael Hogan 3/14 (3 overs)		Aneurin Donald 33 (22); Ryan Higgins 2/13 (2 overs)

Glamorgan won by 7 wickets
Sophia Gardens, Cardiff
Umpires: Alex Wharf and Nigel Cowley
Player of the match: Marchant de Lange (Glam)

- Glamorgan won the toss and elected to field.
- Rain reduced the match to 14 overs-a-side.
- Points: Glamorgan 2, Middlesex 0.

=== Knockout stage ===
==== Quarter-final: Glamorgan v Leicestershire (23 August) ====
23 August
Scorecard

Leicestershire; 123 (19.2 overs)	v	Glamorgan; 126/1 (13.4 overs)
Luke Ronchi 28 (18); Craig Meschede 3/17 (4 overs)		Colin Ingram 70* (43); Clint McKay 1/17 (3 overs)

Glamorgan won by 9 wickets
Sophia Gardens, Cardiff
Umpires: Rob Bailey and Steve O'Shaughnessy
Player of the match: Colin Ingram (Glam)

- Leicestershire won the toss and elected to bat.

==== Semi-final: Warwickshire v Glamorgan (2 September) ====
2 September
Scorecard

Warwickshire; 175/9 (20 overs)	v	Glamorgan; 164 (19.4 overs)
Ed Pollock 50 (27); Craig Meschede 2/24 (4 overs)		Jacques Rudolph 65 (39); Olly Stone 3/29 (4 overs)

Warwickshire won by 11 runs
Edgbaston, Birmingham
Umpires: Alex Wharf and Tim Robinson
Player of the match: Ed Pollock (Warks)

- Glamorgan won the toss and elected to field.

== Pre-season friendly ==
=== Three-day: Glamorgan v Cardiff MCCU (28–30 March) ===
28–30 March
Scorecard

Glamorgan	v	Cardiff MCCU
342/7d (89.2 overs); Jacques Rudolph 142 (230); Oliver Pike 3/82 (19.2 overs)		149/5d (72 overs); Jeremy Lawlor 50* (129); David Lloyd 2/21 (10 overs)

Match drawn
Sophia Gardens, Cardiff
Umpires: Jeff Evans and Russell Warren

- Cardiff MCCU won the toss and elected to field.
- Andrew Brewster, Connor Brown, Jack Scriven and Oliver Pike (all Cardiff MCCU) made their first-class debuts.

== Statistics ==
=== Batting ===
First-class
Player	Matches	Innings	NO	Runs	HS	Ave	SR	100	50	0	4s	6s
Nick Selman	15	27	2	902	142*	36.08	48.39	4	3	4	110	3
Chris Cooke	13	22	5	705	113*	41.47	53.53	1	4	2	97	9
Colin Ingram	12	20	2	672	155*	37.33	48.20	2	1	2	89	5
Jacques Rudolph	12	21	1	634	142	31.70	52.48	2	1	2	89	3
Andrew Salter	13	20	5	623	88	41.53	43.84	0	5	0	83	8
Aneurin Donald	12	21	1	550	66*	27.50	66.58	0	5	2	66	6
Kiran Carlson	9	14	0	469	191	33.50	55.96	1	1	2	64	4
Craig Meschede	7	9	0	296	87	32.88	67.57	0	1	1	38	4
David Lloyd	9	16	1	282	88	18.80	54.23	0	1	3	42	4
Marchant de Lange	11	17	1	254	39	15.87	72.98	0	0	2	29	8
Source: Cricinfo

List A
Player	Matches	Innings	NO	Runs	HS	Ave	SR	100	50	0	4s	6s
Colin Ingram	8	8	0	564	142	70.50	104.44	3	2	0	31	29
Jacques Rudolph	8	8	0	305	121	38.12	79.22	1	2	0	35	2
Chris Cooke	8	8	1	253	62	36.14	104.97	0	2	0	20	8
Will Bragg	6	6	0	233	94	38.83	74.67	0	2	1	24	0
Kiran Carlson	8	8	0	206	63	25.75	100.00	0	1	1	19	3
David Lloyd	8	8	0	127	48	15.87	64.14	0	0	1	16	1
Craig Meschede	8	8	1	92	23	13.14	108.23	0	0	0	8	3
Andrew Salter	5	5	2	81	29*	27.00	80.19	0	0	0	6	4
Marchant de Lange	8	8	4	79	24	19.75	112.85	0	0	0	6	3
Timm van der Gugten	4	2	1	20	11	20.00	66.66	0	0	0	2	0
Aneurin Donald	5	5	0	20	10	4.00	64.51	0	0	1	1	0
Source: Cricinfo

Twenty20
Player	Matches	Innings	NO	Runs	HS	Ave	SR	100	50	0	4s	6s
Colin Ingram	14	13	3	462	114	46.20	166.18	2	1	0	37	30
Jacques Rudolph	14	13	4	443	77*	49.22	129.15	0	4	0	43	8
Aneurin Donald	14	13	0	277	76	21.30	144.27	0	2	1	37	3
Chris Cooke	14	10	2	172	49	21.50	131.29	0	0	0	14	6
Graham Wagg	14	8	6	163	50	81.50	141.73	0	1	0	11	6
David Miller	6	5	2	117	50	39.00	146.25	0	1	1	12	5
Nick Selman	4	3	0	99	66	33.00	128.57	0	1	0	9	0
Andrew Salter	14	5	2	83	37*	27.66	118.57	0	0	0	7	2
Craig Meschede	12	6	3	34	14*	11.33	109.67	0	0	0	3	1
David Lloyd	4	4	0	24	20	6.00	70.58	0	0	1	4	0
Source: Cricinfo

=== Bowling ===
First-class
Player	Matches	Innings	Overs	Maidens	Runs	Wickets	BBI	BBM	Ave	Econ	SR	5w	10w
Michael Hogan	13	23	383.4	88	1,075	52	6/43	10/87	20.67	2.80	44.26	3	1
Lukas Carey	11	18	279.3	54	1,060	35	4/85	5/103	30.28	3.79	47.91	0	0
Marchant de Lange	11	17	345.5	47	1,315	34	5/95	6/135	38.67	3.80	61.02	1	0
Timm van der Gugten	5	9	158.2	43	505	22	5/101	6/105	22.95	3.18	43.18	1	0
Craig Meschede	7	10	138.0	22	482	14	4/61	4/96	34.42	3.49	59.14	0	0
Andrew Salter	13	18	170.4	13	676	14	3/60	3/65	48.28	3.96	73.14	0	0
Ruaidhri Smith	3	5	69.4	6	302	9	3/64	3/99	33.55	4.33	46.44	0	0
Graham Wagg	3	6	60.0	10	206	7	2/14	4/67	29.42	3.43	51.42	0	0
David Lloyd	9	9	79.0	8	341	6	2/21	2/21	56.83	4.31	79.00	0	0
Harry Podmore	2	2	28.1	3	124	3	3/68	3/68	41.33	4.40	56.33	0	0
Source: Cricinfo

List A
Player	Matches	Innings	Overs	Maidens	Runs	Wickets	BBI	Ave	Econ	SR	4w	5w
Marchant de Lange	8	8	73.2	4	405	18	5/49	22.50	5.52	24.44	0	1
Colin Ingram	8	8	43.0	0	269	7	4/39	38.42	6.25	36.85	1	0
David Lloyd	8	8	30.0	0	195	6	5/53	32.50	6.50	30.00	0	1
Michael Hogan	7	7	63.0	1	348	6	2/42	58.00	5.52	63.00	0	0
Timm van der Gugten	4	4	35.4	0	253	4	1/47	63.25	7.09	53.50	0	0
Craig Meschede	8	8	64.0	0	372	4	2/53	93.00	5.81	96.00	0	0
Lukas Carey	4	4	30.0	0	183	3	1/21	61.00	6.10	60.00	0	0
Kiran Carlson	8	1	5.0	0	30	1	1/30	30.00	6.00	30.00	0	0
Source: Cricinfo

Twenty20
Player	Matches	Innings	Overs	Maidens	Runs	Wickets	BBI	Ave	Econ	SR	4w	5w
Michael Hogan	14	13	46.5	0	390	20	5/17	19.50	8.32	14.05	0	1
Marchant de Lange	14	13	46.0	0	382	18	3/19	21.22	8.30	15.33	0	0
Craig Meschede	12	10	25.0	0	197	10	3/17	19.70	7.88	15.00	0	0
Colin Ingram	14	12	40.0	0	315	9	2/27	35.00	7.87	26.66	0	0
Graham Wagg	14	13	37.2	0	341	9	2/12	37.88	9.13	24.88	0	0
Timm van der Gugten	7	6	15.0	0	135	3	1/23	45.00	9.00	30.00	0	0
Andrew Salter	14	8	18.0	0	139	2	1/10	69.50	7.72	54.00	0	0
Lukas Carey	4	4	7.0	0	61	2	1/19	30.50	8.71	21.00	0	0
Source: Cricinfo
