= Glamorgan County Cricket Club in 2020 =

Welsh cricket club season

Glamorgan County Cricket Club
2020 season
- Coach: (Wales) Matthew Maynard
- Captain: (South Africa) Chris Cooke
- Overseas player: (Ireland) Andrew Balbirnie (T20 Blast)
- Ground(s): Sophia Gardens, Cardiff
- Bob Willis Trophy: 6th, Central Group
- T20 Blast: 5th, Central Group
- Most runs: FC: Chris Cooke (294); T20: Andrew Balbirnie (255)
- Most wickets: FC: Dan Douthwaite (14); T20: Timm van der Gugten (14)
- Most catches: FC: Nick Selman (10); T20: Callum Taylor (4)
- Most wicket-keeping dismissals: FC: Chris Cooke (16 ct + 2 st); T20: Chris Cooke (6 ct + 3 st)

The 2020 season was Glamorgan County Cricket Club's 133rd year in existence and their 100th as a first-class cricket county. They played all of their home matches at Sophia Gardens in Cardiff. Due to the COVID-19 pandemic, no cricket was played until the first week of August, and the County Championship was replaced for the 2020 season by the Bob Willis Trophy, a shortened form of the first-class game intended to reduce impact on bowlers who had been unable to train for the first few months of the summer; the 18 counties were placed into three roughly geographical groups of six teams each, and played one game against each of the other counties in their group either home or away. At the end of this stage, the two teams from across the three groups with the most points from their five matches faced each other in the final at Lord's. Glamorgan finished bottom of the Central Group, failing to win any of their five matches. Although the One-Day Cup was cancelled, there was still some white-ball cricket to be played in the form of the T20 Blast, which maintained its usual format: three regional groups of six teams each, with games against each of the other counties in the group, both home and away. Only Worcestershire Royals finished below Glamorgan, who won just four of their ten matches.

The team was led by Matthew Maynard in his first year back as full-time head coach, having served in an interim capacity for the 2019 season after the departure of Robert Croft, before signing a three-year contract in November 2019. Wicketkeeper-batsman Chris Cooke retained the captaincy in the County Championship and took over from Colin Ingram in the T20 Blast, as Ingram was due to play in The Hundred for Welsh Fire; ultimately, due to the COVID-19 pandemic, Ingram was unable to travel to the UK from South Africa due to travel restrictions. Australian batter Marnus Labuschagne was also unable to return as Glamorgan's overseas player for the 2020 season, again due to travel restrictions, although he did sign a new contract with the club, committing to an extra year. Glamorgan signed Ireland captain Andrew Balbirnie as their overseas player for the T20 Blast. All-rounder Craig Meschede was forced to retire in June 2020 due to thoracic outlet syndrome in his upper right arm.

== Bob Willis Trophy ==
=== Central Group ===
Team	Pld	W	L	T	D	A	Bat	Bowl	Ded	PCF	Pts
Somerset (Q)	5	4	0	0	1	0	10	15	0	0	97
Worcestershire	5	2	1	0	2	0	14	12	0	0	74
Warwickshire	5	0	1	0	4	0	7	14	0	0	53
Northamptonshire	5	1	2	0	2	0	4	13	0	0	49
Gloucestershire	5	1	2	0	2	0	3	10	0	0	45
Glamorgan	5	0	2	0	3	0	6	13	0	0	43

Source: BBC Sport, Cricinfo, ECB
(Q) Qualified for Final

==== Somerset v Glamorgan (1–4 August) ====
1–4 August
Scorecard

Somerset	v	Glamorgan
296 (81 overs); Steven Davies 81* (108); Ruaidhri Smith 3/41 (14 overs)		131 (46.1 overs); Graham Wagg 28 (60); Craig Overton 5/38 (17 overs)
290/8d (80.1 overs); Tom Abell 119 (167); Kieran Bull 3/112 (19.1 overs)		166 (64.2 overs); Chris Cooke 82 (138); Jamie Overton 5/48 (17 overs)

Somerset won by 289 runs
County Ground, Taunton
Umpires: Ian Blackwell and Russell Warren

- Somerset won the toss and elected to bat.
- Tom Lammonby (Somst) made his first-class debut.
- Ben Green replaced George Bartlett for Somerset on day 3 as a concussion substitute.
- Points: Somerset 21, Glamorgan 3.

==== Worcestershire v Glamorgan (8–11 August) ====
8–11 August
Scorecard

Worcestershire	v	Glamorgan
455/8 (120 overs); Jake Libby 184 (319); Michael Hogan 3/59 (22 overs)		374 (116.3 overs); Billy Root 118 (284); Joe Leach 4/67 (26 overs)
276/6d (71 overs); Daryl Mitchell 94 (163); Graham Wagg 2/73 (12 overs)		141/7 (50.4 overs); Chris Cooke 74 (133); Joe Leach 2/12 (7 overs)

Match drawn
New Road, Worcester
Umpires: Graham Lloyd and Jeremy Lloyds

- Worcestershire won the toss and elected to bat.
- Points: Worcestershire 15, Glamorgan 12.

==== Glamorgan v Gloucestershire (15–18 August) ====
15–18 August
Scorecard

Glamorgan	v	Gloucestershire
116 (59.3 overs); Dan Douthwaite 30* (52); David Payne 5/31 (17 overs)		181 (64.2 overs); Ryan Higgins 48 (62); Graham Wagg 3/38 (13 overs)
197/8 (91 overs); Chris Cooke 59* (158); David Payne 3/30 (20 overs)

Match drawn
Sophia Gardens, Cardiff
Umpires: Ian Blackwell and Jeff Evans

- Gloucestershire won the toss and elected to field.
- No play was possible on day 1 due to rain.
- Points: Glamorgan 11, Gloucestershire 11.

==== Northamptonshire v Glamorgan (22–25 August) ====
22–25 August
Scorecard

Glamorgan	v	Northamptonshire
259 (67 overs); Callum Taylor 106 (94); Jack White 4/48 (12 overs)		332 (108.2 overs); Charlie Thurston 115 (163); Marchant de Lange 4/84 (23.2 overs)
261 (53.5 overs); Marchant de Lange 113 (78); Jack White 4/35 (12 overs)		192/4 (42.3 overs); Emilio Gay 77* (145); Dan Douthwaite 1/33 (7 overs)

Northamptonshire won by 6 wickets
County Cricket Ground, Northampton
Umpires: Chris Watts and Russell Warren

- Northamptonshire won the toss and elected to field.
- Callum Taylor (Glam) made his first-class debut.
- Callum Taylor became the fourth batsman to score a century on debut in a first-class match for Glamorgan.
- Marchant de Lange took just 62 balls to reach his century, the fastest by a Glamorgan batter in first-class cricket.
- Points: Northamptonshire 22, Glamorgan 5.

==== Glamorgan v Warwickshire (6–9 September) ====
6–9 September
Scorecard

Warwickshire	v	Glamorgan
186 (66.3 overs); Ian Bell 50 (116); Dan Douthwaite 3/42 (13 overs)		203 (68.4 overs); Billy Root 51* (100); Liam Norwell 4/43 (20 overs)
347/7d (88.5 overs); Ian Bell 90 (148); Dan Douthwaite 2/61 (13.1 overs)		265/9 (95 overs); Nick Selman 73 (215); Oliver Hannon-Dalby 4/59 (25 overs)

Match drawn
Sophia Gardens, Cardiff
Umpires: Jeff Evans and Rob White

- Glamorgan won the toss and elected to field.
- Points: Glamorgan 12, Warwickshire 11.

== T20 Blast ==
=== Standings ===
Pos	Team	Pld	W	L	T	NR	Pts	NRR
1	Gloucestershire	10	7	2	0	1	15	1.017
2	Northants Steelbacks	10	5	4	0	1	11	0.053
3	Birmingham Bears	10	5	4	0	1	11	−0.634
4	Somerset	10	4	5	0	1	9	0.653
5	Glamorgan	10	4	5	0	1	9	−0.304
6	Worcestershire Rapids	10	2	7	0	1	5	−0.789

Updated to match(es) played on 20 September 2020. Source: BBC Sport, England and Wales Cricket Board

Advance to quarter-finals

=== Matches ===
==== Glamorgan v Worcestershire Rapids (27 August) ====
27 August
18:30 (D/N)
Scorecard

Glamorgan	v	Worcestershire Rapids

Match abandoned without a ball bowled
Sophia Gardens, Cardiff
Umpires: Jeff Evans and Jeremy Lloyds

- No toss.
- No play was possible due to rain.
- Points: Glamorgan 1, Worcestershire Rapids 1.

==== Gloucestershire v Glamorgan (29 August) ====
29 August
14:00
Scorecard

Glamorgan; 150/7 (20 overs)	v	Gloucestershire; 135 (20 overs)
Chris Cooke 51* (35); Ryan Higgins 3/29 (4 overs)		Graeme van Buuren 53 (27); Andrew Salter 4/20 (4 overs)

Glamorgan won by 15 runs
County Ground, Bristol
Umpires: Jeff Evans and Ian Blackwell
Player of the match: Andrew Salter (Glam)

- Gloucestershire won the toss and elected to field.
- Points: Glamorgan 2, Gloucestershire 0.

==== Glamorgan v Birmingham Bears (30 August) ====
30 August
14:00
Scorecard

Glamorgan; 140/9 (20 overs)	v	Birmingham Bears; 141/4 (18.5 overs)
Chris Cooke 72 (56); Tim Bresnan 3/33 (4 overs)		Adam Hose 38 (22); Marchant de Lange 1/19 (3 overs)

Birmingham Bears won by 6 wickets
Sophia Gardens, Cardiff
Umpires: Jeff Evans and Ian Blackwell
Player of the match: Chris Cooke (Glam)

- Glamorgan won the toss and elected to bat.
- Points Birmingham Bears 2, Glamorgan 0.

==== Somerset v Glamorgan (1 September) ====
1 September
18:30 (D/N)
Scorecard

Glamorgan; 133/8 (20 overs)	v	Somerset; 134/2 (16.1 overs)
Chris Cooke 42 (34); Ben Green 4/26 (4 overs)		Tom Abell 74* (45); Timm van der Gugten 1/15 (2.1 overs)

Somerset won by 8 wickets
County Ground, Taunton
Umpires: Jeremy Lloyds and Ian Blackwell
Player of the match: Ben Green (Somst)

- Somerset won the toss and elected to field.
- Points: Somerset 2, Glamorgan 0.

==== Northamptonshire Steelbacks v Glamorgan (3 September) ====
3 September
18:35 (D/N)
Scorecard

Glamorgan; 160/7 (20 overs)	v	Northamptonshire Steelbacks; 161/6 (19.2 overs)
Andrew Balbirnie 58 (38); Nathan Buck 4/29 (4 overs)		Alex Wakely 36* (29); Prem Sisodiya 1/29 (4 overs)

Northamptonshire Steelbacks won by 4 wickets
Edgbaston Cricket Ground, Birmingham
Umpires: Rob Bailey and Nick Cook
Player of the match: Andrew Balbirnie (Glam)

- Northants Steelbacks won the toss and elected to field.
- Points: Northants Steelbacks 2, Glamorgan 0.

==== Birmingham Bears v Glamorgan (11 September) ====
11 September
18:30 (D/N)
Scorecard

Birmingham Bears; 142/9 (20 overs)	v	Glamorgan; 129/8 (20 overs)
Will Rhodes 46 (31); Timm van der Gugten 3/27 (4 overs)		Andrew Balbirnie 30 (29); Jake Lintott 3/11 (4 overs)

Birmingham Bears won by 13 runs
Edgbaston Cricket Ground, Birmingham
Umpires: Russell Warren and Tom Lungley
Player of the match: Jake Lintott (B'ham)

- Birmingham Bears won the toss and elected to bat.
- Points: Birmingham Bears 2, Glamorgan 0.

==== Glamorgan v Northamptonshire Steelbacks (13 September) ====
13 September
14:00
Scorecard

Northants Steelbacks; 98 (17.2 overs)	v	Glamorgan; 99/3 (16 overs)
Tom Sole 25 (31); Timm van der Gugten 3/17 (3 overs)		David Lloyd 40 (29); Gareth Berg 1/8 (2 overs)

Glamorgan won by 7 wickets
Sophia Gardens, Cardiff
Umpires: Jeff Evans and Russell Warren
Player of the match: David Lloyd (Glam)

- Northants Steelbacks won the toss and elected to bat.
- Points: Glamorgan 2, Northants Steelbacks 0.

==== Glamorgan v Somerset (16 September) ====
16 September
18:30 (D/N)
Scorecard

Somerset; 183/3 (20 overs)	v	Glamorgan; 117 (15.5 overs)
Babar Azam 114* (62); Prem Sisodiya 1/26 (4 overs)		Owen Morgan 24 (13); Craig Overton 3/36 (2.5 overs)

Somerset won by 66 runs
Sophia Gardens, Cardiff
Umpires: Jeff Evans and Jeremy Lloyds
Player of the match: Babar Azam (Somst)

- Glamorgan won the toss and elected to field.
- Lewis Goldsworthy (Somst) made his T20 debut.
- Points: Somerset 2, Glamorgan 0.

==== Glamorgan v Gloucestershire (18 September) ====
18 September
18:30 (D/N)
Scorecard

Glamorgan; 188/4 (20 overs)	v	Gloucestershire; 171/6 (20 overs)
Andrew Balbirnie 99* (54); Tom Smith 1/26 (4 overs)		Chris Dent 55 (36); Graham Wagg 3/34 (4 overs)

Glamorgan won by 17 runs
Sophia Gardens, Cardiff
Umpires: Jeff Evans and Jeremy Lloyds
Player of the match: Andrew Balbirnie (Glam)

- Glamorgan won the toss and elected to bat.
- Points: Glamorgan 2, Gloucestershire 0.

==== Worcestershire Rapids v Glamorgan (20 September) ====
20 September
13:00
Scorecard

Worcestershire Rapids; 190/3 (20 overs)	v	Glamorgan; 196/4 (19.4 overs)
Hamish Rutherford 100 (62); Timm van der Gugten 3/28 (4 overs)		Nick Selman 78 (53); Pat Brown 2/63 (3.4 overs)

Glamorgan won by 6 wickets
New Road, Worcester
Umpires: Ian Blackwell and Ian Ramage
Player of the match: Hamish Rutherford (Worcs)

- Worcestershire Rapids won the toss and elected to bat.
- Points: Glamorgan 2, Worcestershire Rapids 0.

== Statistics ==
=== Batting ===
First-class
Player	Matches	Innings	NO	Runs	HS	Ave	SR	100	50	0	4s	6s
Chris Cooke	5	10	1	294	82	32.66	48.19	0	3	2	37	0
Billy Root	5	10	1	286	118	31.77	40.45	1	1	0	39	1
Nick Selman	5	10	0	215	73	21.50	35.53	0	2	2	27	0
Dan Douthwaite	5	10	1	160	86	17.77	52.45	0	1	2	19	4
Callum Taylor	2	4	0	153	106	38.25	67.10	1	0	1	19	6
Marchant de Lange	3	5	1	131	113	32.75	121.29	1	0	1	8	10
Kiran Carlson	4	8	0	109	79	13.62	36.57	0	1	1	14	0
Graham Wagg	3	6	1	100	54	20.00	50.00	0	1	1	13	0
Timm van der Gugten	4	7	3	98	30*	24.50	40.66	0	0	0	14	0
Tom Cullen	3	6	0	80	26	13.33	52.28	0	0	0	14	0
Source: Cricinfo

Twenty20
Player	Matches	Innings	NO	Runs	HS	Ave	SR	100	50	0	4s	6s
Andrew Balbirnie	9	9	2	255	99*	36.42	144.88	0	2	0	25	7
Chris Cooke	9	9	2	221	72	31.57	123.46	0	2	1	12	9
Nick Selman	6	6	0	176	78	29.33	123.94	0	1	0	20	4
David Lloyd	5	5	0	160	56	32.00	139.13	0	1	0	15	5
Callum Taylor	7	7	1	76	23	12.66	84.44	0	0	0	6	1
Dan Douthwaite	6	6	2	75	23*	18.75	178.57	0	0	1	6	6
Marchant de Lange	7	6	2	68	28*	17.00	128.30	0	0	0	7	2
Timm van der Gugten	8	4	2	49	34*	24.50	140.00	0	0	0	3	2
Andrew Salter	9	5	3	45	14	22.50	115.38	0	0	1	3	2
Owen Morgan	4	3	0	44	24	14.66	112.82	0	0	0	4	2
Source: Cricinfo

=== Bowling ===
First-class
Player	Matches	Innings	Overs	Maidens	Runs	Wickets	BBI	BBM	Ave	Econ	SR	5w	10w
Dan Douthwaite	5	9	121.1	16	473	14	3/42	5/103	33.78	3.90	51.92	0	0
Timm van der Gugten	4	7	119.0	31	362	12	3/45	5/115	30.16	3.04	59.50	0	0
Graham Wagg	3	5	73.0	14	272	11	3/38	5/139	24.72	3.72	39.81	0	0
Marchant de Lange	3	5	81.2	17	218	9	4/84	4/115	24.22	2.68	54.22	0	0
Kieran Bull	4	7	102.3	4	462	9	3/112	4/221	51.33	4.50	68.33	0	0
Michael Hogan	4	8	139.0	32	397	8	3/59	3/90	49.62	2.85	104.25	0	0
Ruaidhri Smith	1	1	14.0	4	41	3	3/41	3/41	13.66	2.92	28.00	0	0
Lukas Carey	1	2	24.5	4	82	3	3/54	3/82	27.33	3.30	49.66	0	0
Callum Taylor	2	3	26.0	2	81	2	1/20	1/20	40.50	3.11	78.00	0	0
Owen Morgan	1	1	11.5	0	43	1	1/43	1/43	43.00	3.63	71.00	0	0
Source: Cricinfo

Twenty20
Player	Matches	Innings	Overs	Maidens	Runs	Wickets	BBI	Ave	Econ	SR	4w	5w
Timm van der Gugten	8	8	28.0	0	209	14	3/17	14.92	7.46	12.00	0	0
Prem Sisodiya	9	9	36.0	1	232	10	3/26	23.20	6.44	21.60	0	0
Andrew Salter	9	9	36.0	0	293	10	4/20	29.30	8.13	21.60	1	0
Marchant de Lange	7	7	21.4	0	168	5	2/23	33.60	7.75	26.00	0	0
Ruaidhri Smith	6	6	22.0	0	178	5	2/13	35.60	8.09	26.40	0	0
Callum Taylor	7	2	5.0	0	38	3	2/9	12.66	7.60	10.00	0	0
Graham Wagg	6	5	16.0	0	143	3	3/34	47.66	8.93	32.00	0	0
Dan Douthwaite	6	3	7.0	0	64	1	1/29	64.00	9.14	42.00	0	0
Source: Cricinfo
