= Steve Leach (cricketer) =

English cricketer (born 1993)

Personal information
- Full name: Stephen Geoffrey Leach
- Born: 19 November 1993 (age 32); Stafford, Staffordshire, England
- Batting: Left-handed
- Bowling: Leg break
- Relatives: Joe Leach (brother)

Domestic team information
- Years: Team
- 2011–2019: Shropshire
- 2014–2016: Oxford MCCU

Career statistics
Competition	First-class
Matches	6
Runs scored	211
Batting average	21.10
100s/50s	0/1
Top score	63
Balls bowled	4
Wickets	0
Bowling average	–
5 wickets in innings	–
10 wickets in match	–
Best bowling	–
Catches/stumpings	4/–
- Source: Cricinfo, 10 July 2019

Stephen Geoffrey Leach (born 19 November 1993) is an English former first-class cricketer.

Leach was born at Stafford in November 1993. He was educated at Shrewsbury School, before going up to Oxford Brookes University. While studying at Oxford Brookes, he made his debut in first-class cricket for Oxford MCCU against Nottinghamshire at Oxford in 2014. He played first-class cricket for Oxford MCCU until 2016, making a total of six appearances. He scored a total of 211 runs in his six matches, with a high score of 63. In addition to playing first-class cricket, Leach also played minor counties cricket for Shropshire from 2011–19, making 34 appearances in the Minor Counties Championship, eighteen appearances in the MCCA Knockout Trophy, and a single appearance in the Minor Counties T20. His brother, Joe, was also a first-class cricketer.
