= Darland High School =

Secondary school in Rossett, Wales

Location
- Rossett, Wrexham, Wales; 53°06′53″N 2°56′06″W

Information
- Motto: Aspire, Apply, Achieve
- Established: September 1958
- Chair: Robert Walsh
- Head teacher: Joanne Lee
- Houses: T, R, E, V, A, L, Y, N
- Website: darland.wrexham.sch.uk

Darland High School is a mixed, non-denominational high school in Rossett, Wales, established in 1958. Its current head teacher is Joanne Lee.

== History ==
=== 1958 – 1971 ===
Darland High School opened in September 1958 for 234 pupils, 10 members of staff and the headmaster, Glyn Bellis. The school cost £96,000 and was completed in just 18 months. It was reported that the school would "play a vital part in the development of horticulture and market gardening pursuits, for many of the pupils come from the strawberry-growing district of Holt". During that first year the school grounds were enhanced with flower beds laid out under the direction of J. Elwy Williams. The official opening ceremony took place on 9 June 1959, in a whole school celebratory assembly.

Throughout the years, Darland has welcomed many visitors. In 1959, the school was honoured with a visit from Chiefs Zulu and Putranali of Tanzania who presented Bellis with a 'beautiful skin'. Unfortunately, the health risk posed by the fleas outweighed the hospitality of these gentlemen and the skin had to be burnt when they had departed. In 1966, the school was visited by the Christian missionary Gladys Aylward, whose life was the subject of the 1958 film The Inn of the Sixth Happiness.

A small school, Darland soon gained both national and international attention, as the work done in the Rural Studies department merited a programme on BBC television and a visit from the first television gardener, Percy Thrower, in 1971. In the same year, the Darland School bee keeping group appeared on the BBC programme Young Scientists of the Year.

=== 1972 – 2001 ===
In 1972, Darland became a comprehensive school, leading to a massive increase in pupils and staff. An extensive building programme accompanied the arrival of hundreds of new children and many new staff. In 1977, Bellis retired and was replaced in January 1978 by Darland's second headteacher, Derrick Gwilliam. Gwilliam and his staff not only consolidated but increased the academic and extra-curricular activity at Darland. In 1983, Darland's Silver Jubilee was celebrated with a variety of events. To commemorate the occasion, pupils produced a time capsule, containing a collection of essays, photographs, coins, stamps, and newspapers. In June 1987, the music suite was built, and the time capsule was buried in the floor of the new suite and remains there to this day.

In 1987–88, Darland featured on the BBC's Q.E.D., as it was at the centre of trials for vitamin tablets which claimed to boost children's IQ levels. In September 1995, the then Welsh Secretary William Hague visited Darland School to launch the Conservative Government's 'Young People and Sport in Wales' campaign. The aim was to increase the number of young people taking part in sport activities by the year 2000.

The school has had a long tradition of sporting achievement having won numerous trophies and produced some fine athletes. In December 1996, Darland Sports Centre was opened by Mr Andrew Marriott of Wrexham Football Club. Andrew Marriott unveiled a plaque commemorating the opening. In December 1996, Gwilliam retired, and was replaced by the third headteacher, Chris Hughes. In 2001, the school won recognition in The Guinness Book of Records for the World's Biggest Hug, in an event that brought together a huge cross-section of the local population.

=== 2004 – present ===
In September 2004, Darland welcomed the First Minister of the Welsh Assembly, Rhodri Morgan, who unveiled a plaque in memory of the miners who lost their lives in the 1934 Gresford disaster. Another commemorative event was held in June 2005 to mark the 60th anniversary of the end of World War II. Pupils hosted a VE Day style party for veterans of the war and recorded interviews on the BBC's Wartime Memories website.

In February 2009, Darland received a visit from Jane Hutt, the Minister for Children, Education, Lifelong Learning and Skills. The Welsh Assembly Government had allocated in excess of £5,000,000 for the refurbishment of three Wrexham high schools and Darland was to be included. This year also saw the arrival of the FA Cup trophy. Darland was the only school in Wrexham that the FA Cup visited, and every pupil had the opportunity to have their photograph taken with it. Henry Olonga, the international Zimbabwean cricketer, also visited in 2009. He shared his knowledge with some of Darland cricket players, and gave a speech about the demise of democracy in Zimbabwe and the importance of grasping every opportunity and making the most of education. The climax of 2009 was the 50th anniversary celebrations of the school, attended by pupils and staff past and present. The close of the school term saw the retirement of Chris Hughes. Peter Agnew, from Flint High School, was appointed as the fourth headteacher of Darland.

In 2012 a BBC documentary was aired about maths prodigy Cameron Thompson featuring the school.
