= Tom Jewell =

English cricketer

Personal information
- Full name: Thomas Melvin Jewell
- Born: 13 January 1991 (age 35); Reading, Berkshire, England
- Batting: Right-handed
- Bowling: Right-arm fast-medium

Domestic team information
- Years: Team
- 2008–present: Surrey (squad no. 8)
- FC debut: 12 April 2008 Surrey v Loughborough UCCE
- LA debut: 13 September 2009 Surrey v Northamptonshire

Career statistics
Competition	FC	LA
Matches	9	8
Runs scored	185	31
Batting average	30.83	5.16
100s/50s	0/2	0/0
Top score	70	13
Balls bowled	898	114
Wickets	19	1
Bowling average	27.42	158.00
5 wickets in innings	1	0
10 wickets in match	0	n/a
Best bowling	5/49	1/20
Catches/stumpings	2/–	3/–
- Source: CricketArchive, 11 March 2014

Thomas Melvin Jewell (born 13 January 1991) is an English cricketer. Jewell is a right-handed batsman who bowls right-arm fast-medium. He was born at Reading, Berkshire.

Jewell made his first-class debut for Surrey against Loughborough UCCE in 2008. He represented the county in 3 first-class matches in 2010 against Cambridge University, the touring Bangladeshis, as well as making his County Championship debut against Northamptonshire.

His debut in List-A cricket came against Northamptonshire in the 2009 Pro40 and he went on to play a total of 8 List-A games. He was released by Surrey in 2014.
