= Joe Leach =

English cricketer

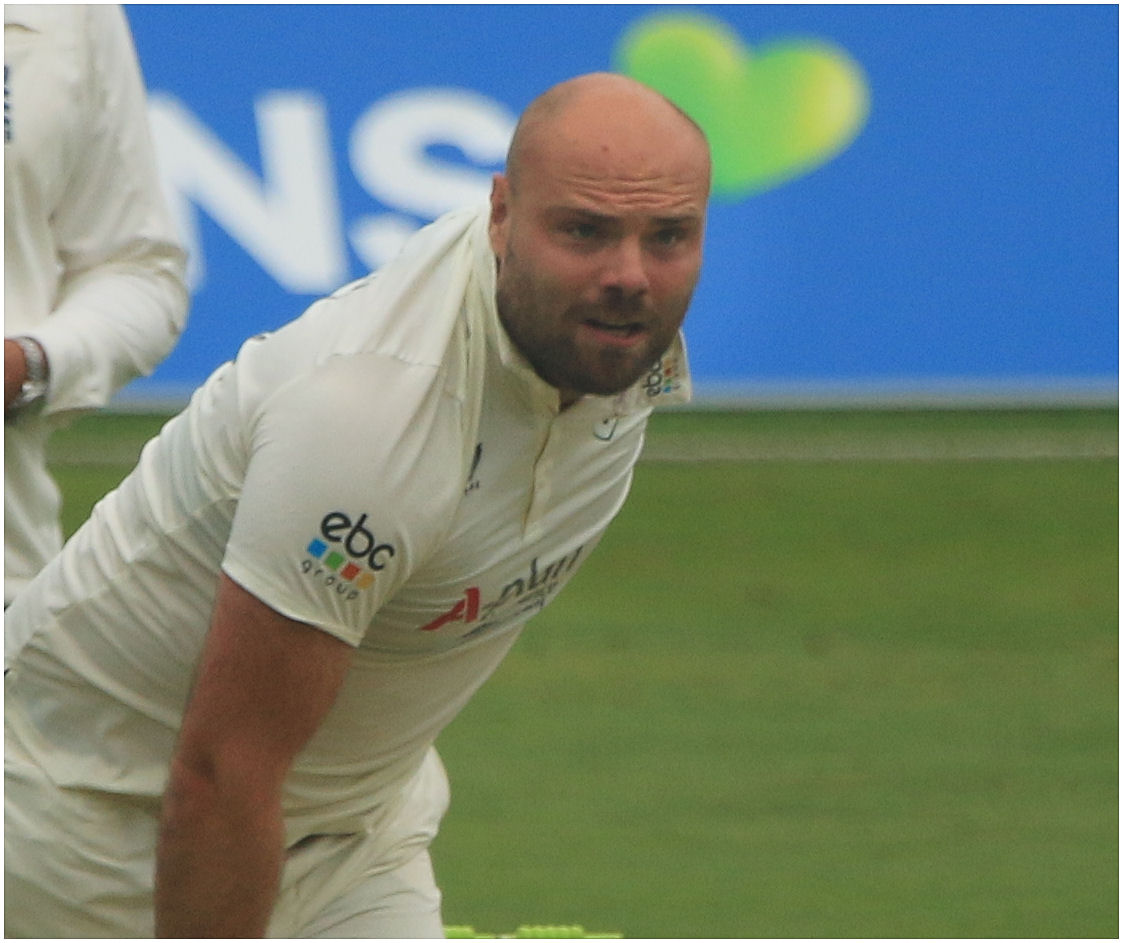
- Leach in 2023

Personal information
- Full name: Joseph Leach
- Born: 30 October 1990 (age 36); Stafford, Staffordshire, England
- Height: 6 ft 1 in (1.85 m)
- Batting: Right-handed
- Bowling: Right-arm medium-fast
- Relatives: Steve Leach (brother)

Domestic team information
- Years: Team
- 2011–2012: Leeds/Bradford MCCU
- 2012–2024: Worcestershire (squad no. 23)
- First-class debut: 31 March 2012 Leeds/Bradford MCCU v Surrey
- Last First-class: 26 September 2024 Worcestershire v Lancashire
- List A debut: 27 April 2012 Worcestershire v Lancashire
- Last List A: 27 August 2023 Worcestershire v Hampshire

Career statistics
Competition	FC	LA	T20
Matches	139	59	54
Runs scored	3,990	903	261
Batting average	22.93	28.21	10.44
100s/50s	2/23	0/3	0/0
Top score	114	88	24
Balls bowled	23,516	2,589	849
Wickets	477	57	52
Bowling average	26.91	43.87	26.05
5 wickets in innings	18	0	1
10 wickets in match	1	0	0
Best bowling	6/44	4/30	5/33
Catches/stumpings	32/–	21/–	10/–
- Source: ESPNcricinfo, 30 September 2024

Joseph Leach (born 30 October 1990) is a former English cricketer who played for Worcestershire. Leach was a right-handed batsman who bowled right-arm medium. He was born in Stafford, Staffordshire, and was educated at Shrewsbury School.

== Career ==
Leach made his debut for Staffordshire against Buckinghamshire in the 2008 Minor Counties Championship. The following season he made a further appearance in that competition for the county, against Northumberland at Osborne Avenue, Jesmond. He also made a single appearance in the MCCA Knockout Trophy in 2009 against Suffolk. Leach joined Shropshire in 2010, making his debut for the county in the MCCA Knockout Trophy against Cumberland.

While studying French and Philosophy at the University of Leeds, Leach made his first appearance for Leeds/Bradford MCCU in 2011. The England and Wales Cricket Board conferred first-class status on Leeds/Bradford MCCU in 2012, with Leach making his first-class debut against Surrey at The Oval. In Surrey's first-innings of 385 all out, Leach took figures of 4/78 from thirteen overs, the best bowling figures of the innings. In Leeds/Bradford MCCU's first-innings response, Leach was dismissed for a duck by Tom Jewell. In their second-innings, he recorded his maiden first-class half century with a score of exactly 50, before being dismissed by Tim Linley. Leeds/Bradford MCCU narrowly lost the match by 2 runs.

Leach played grade cricket in ACT for North Canberra Gungahlin Cricket Club during 2016–2017 season.

He developed into a key member of Worcestershire's squad, becoming a first-team regular in 2015. In 2016 he was appointed county captain.

In July 2024, Leach announced he would retire from professional cricket at the end of that year's English county season. He ended his final season as Worcestershire's joint leading County Championship wicket-taker alongside Nathan Smith and Tom Taylor.

Sporting positions
Preceded by Daryl Mitchell	Worcestershire County Cricket Captain; 2017 to 2021	Succeeded by Brett D'Oliveira
