= Jack Murphy (cricketer) =

Welsh cricketer (born 1995)

Personal information
- Full name: Jack Roger Murphy
- Born: 15 July 1995 (age 31); Haverfordwest, Pembrokeshire, Wales
- Batting: Left-handed
- Bowling: Left-arm fast-medium
- Role: All-rounder

Domestic team information
- Years: Team
- 2015–2019: Glamorgan (squad no. 7)
- 2015: Cardiff MCCU
- FC debut: 2 April 2015 Cardiff MCCU v Glamorgan
- LA debut: 15 July 2016 Glamorgan v Pakistan A

Career statistics
Competition	First-class	List A
Matches	18	3
Runs scored	669	25
Batting average	22.30	8.33
100s/50s	0/2	0/0
Top score	80	10
Balls bowled	339	60
Wickets	3	0
Bowling average	69.33	–
5 wickets in innings	0	–
10 wickets in match	0	–
Best bowling	2/90	–
Catches/stumpings	6/–	0/–
- Source: CricInfo, 28 September 2018

Jack Roger Murphy (born 15 July 1995) is a Welsh former professional cricketer who played for Glamorgan County Cricket Club and Cardiff MCC University. He played as an all-rounder who batted left-handed and bowled left-arm fast-medium deliveries. He made his first-class debut for Cardiff MCC University against Glamorgan in April 2015.

In June 2019, Murphy was forced to retire from professional cricket due to a knee-injury at the age of 23.
