= James Kettleborough =

English cricketer (born 1992)

Personal information
- Full name: James Michael Kettleborough
- Born: 22 October 1992 (age 34); Huntingdon, Cambridgeshire, England
- Batting: Right-handed
- Bowling: Right arm off break
- Role: Batsman

Domestic team information
- Years: Team
- 2014: Northamptonshire
- 2015–2016: Glamorgan
- 2017: Northamptonshire (squad no. 3)
- 2018: Derbyshire
- FC debut: 5 June 2014 Northamptonshire v Sri Lankans
- LA debut: 14 August 2014 Northamptonshire v Lancashire

Career statistics
Competition	FC	LA
Matches	22	5
Runs scored	950	84
Batting average	25.00	21.00
100s/50s	0/6	0/0
Top score	81	26
Catches/stumpings	12/–	0/–
- Source: CricketArchive, 5 June 2017

James Michael Kettleborough (born 22 October 1992) is an English cricketer who most recently played for Glamorgan.

== Biography ==
Born in Huntingdon and educated at Bedford School. An opening batsman who previously played for Bedfordshire and Northamptonshire. He made his first-class debut in Northamptonshire's four-day match against the touring Sri Lanka side on 5–8 June 2014. He played 8 more matches for the county that year, before moving to Glamorgan for the start of the 2015 season.
