= David Lloyd (cricketer, born 1992) =

Welsh cricketer (born 1992)

Personal information
- Full name: David Liam Lloyd
- Born: 15 June 1992 (age 34); St Asaph, Denbighshire, Wales
- Batting: Right-handed
- Bowling: Right-arm medium
- Role: All-rounder, occasional wicket-keeper

Domestic team information
- Years: Team
- 2012–2023: Glamorgan (squad no. 73)
- 2021: Welsh Fire
- 2023: → Derbyshire (on loan)
- 2024–2025: Derbyshire
- First-class debut: 4 September 2012 Glamorgan v Yorkshire
- List A debut: 26 July 2014 Glamorgan v Middlesex

Career statistics
Competition	FC	LA	T20
Matches	127	63	96
Runs scored	5,915	1,426	1,985
Batting average	29.42	27.42	23.35
100s/50s	6/28	0/10	0/12
Top score	313*	92	97*
Balls bowled	8,113	913	150
Wickets	115	22	7
Bowling average	44.85	41.31	30.57
5 wickets in innings	0	1	0
10 wickets in match	0	0	0
Best bowling	4/11	5/53	2/13
Catches/stumpings	64/–	18/–	22/–
- Source: Cricinfo, 26 July 2025

David Liam Lloyd (born 15 June 1992) is a Welsh former cricketer who played for, and captained, both Glamorgan and Derbyshire County Cricket Clubs. He was a right-handed batsman and right-arm medium-pace bowler.

== Early years ==
Born in St Asaph, Denbighshire, and educated at Darland High School and Shrewsbury School, Lloyd made his debut in county cricket for Wales Minor Counties against Herefordshire in the 2010 Minor Counties Championship, making two further appearances in that season against Wiltshire and Dorset. The following season he made four appearances in the Minor Counties Championship, as well as making his debut in the MCCA Knockout Trophy against Cornwall, playing twice more in that competition against Wiltshire and Berkshire. He also made three appearances in the 2012 MCCA Knockout Trophy.

== Domestic career ==
Having played for the Glamorgan Second XI since 2008, he joined their playing staff in 2012, and made his first-class debut for the county against Yorkshire in the 2012 County Championship, followed by a second first-class appearance against Kent in the same season.

In September 2022, Lloyd hit a career-best 313 not out in the first innings of a County Championship match against Derbyshire; it was the second highest score of all time by a Glamorgan batsman, the highest in a Glamorgan home match and the highest by a Glamorgan captain.

At the end of the 2023 season Lloyd moved on loan to Derbyshire, before the 2024 season his loan was made permanent. He captained Derbyshire in 2024 but stood down from the role in March 2025.

In September 2025, Lloyd announced his retirement from professional cricket.
