= Jeremy Lawlor =

Welsh cricketer

Personal information
- Full name: Jeremy Lloyd Lawlor
- Born: 4 November 1995 (age 31); Cardiff, Wales
- Batting: Right-handed
- Bowling: Right-arm medium-fast
- Role: All-rounder
- Relatives: Peter Lawlor (father)

Domestic team information
- Years: Team
- 2015–2019: Glamorgan (squad no. 6)
- 2015–2017: Cardiff MCCU
- 2020: Munster Reds
- 2021: Northern Knights
- First-class debut: 2 April 2015 Cardiff MCCU v Glamorgan

Career statistics
Competition	FC	LA	T20
Matches	12	11	8
Runs scored	405	373	78
Batting average	22.50	37.29	11.14
100s/50s	0/3	0/2	0/0
Top score	81	95	43
Balls bowled	475	–	–
Wickets	7	–	–
Bowling average	39.85	–	–
5 wickets in innings	0	–	–
10 wickets in match	0	–	–
Best bowling	3/59	–	–
Catches/stumpings	10/–	4/–	4/–
- Source: Cricinfo, 10 July 2021

Jeremy Lloyd Lawlor (born 4 November 1995) is a Welsh cricketer who played for Glamorgan County Cricket Club and Cardiff MCC University. He holds an Irish passport and plays for the Northern Knights

He is a right-handed batsman who also bowls right-arm medium fast. He made his first-class debut for Cardiff MCC University against Glamorgan in April 2015. He made his List A debut on 25 April 2019, for Glamorgan in the 2019 Royal London One-Day Cup. He made his T20 debut on 18 July 2019, for Glamorgan against Somerset, in the 2019 t20 Blast.

In February 2021, Lawlor was named in the Ireland Wolves' squad for their tour to Bangladesh. In July 2021, Lawlor was added to Ireland's One Day International (ODI) squad for their series against South Africa.
