= Will Bragg =

Welsh cricketer (born 1986)

Personal information
- Full name: William David Bragg
- Born: 24 October 1986 (age 40); Newport, Monmouthshire, Wales
- Batting: Left-handed
- Bowling: Right-arm medium
- Role: Batsman, occasional wicket-keeper

Domestic team information
- Years: Team
- 2004–2010: Wales Minor Counties
- 2007–2017: Glamorgan (squad no. 22)
- FC debut: 30 August 2007 Glamorgan v Somerset
- LA debut: 4 May 2005 WMC v Essex

Career statistics
Competition	FC	LA	T20
Matches	111	47	2
Runs scored	5,673	1,303	21
Batting average	30.17	31.78	10.50
100s/50s	6/35	0/10	0/0
Top score	161*	94	15
Balls bowled	698	44	–
Wickets	5	1	–
Bowling average	91.80	54.00	–
5 wickets in innings	0	0	–
10 wickets in match	0	0	–
Best bowling	2/10	1/11	–
Catches/stumpings	46/1	6/0	0/–
- Source: CricketArchive, 31 August 2017

William David Bragg (born 24 October 1986) is a former Welsh cricketer. Born in Newport, he first came to prominence scoring an unbeaten 115 in Glamorgan's pre season tour of South Africa in 2007. He is a top order batsman for Glamorgan often batting at number 3, although Mark Cosgrove dislodged him from this spot for a little time. Despite his 45 first class matches, he has only managed two centuries against Leicestershire in 2011 and 2015. He is also a wicket-keeper. He was educated at Rougemont School.He announced his retirement on 5 December 2017
