= Stephen Gale =

English cricketer and umpire

Personal information
- Full name: Stephen Clifford Gale
- Born: 3 June 1952 (age 74); Shrewsbury, Shropshire, England
- Batting: Right-handed
- Bowling: Leg break
- Role: Umpire

Domestic team information
- Years: Team
- 1975–1987: Shropshire

Umpiring information
- WODIs umpired: 1 (2010)

Career statistics
Competition	List A
Matches	5
Runs scored	156
Batting average	31.20
100s/50s	–/1
Top score	68
Balls bowled	–
Wickets	–
Bowling average	–
5 wickets in innings	–
10 wickets in match	–
Best bowling	–
Catches/stumpings	–/–
- Source: Cricinfo, 3 July 2011

Stephen Clifford Gale (born 3 June 1952) is a former English cricketer and current umpire. Gale was a right-handed batsman who bowled leg break. He was born in Shrewsbury, Shropshire and educated at the Wakeman Grammar School there.

Gale made his debut for Shropshire in the 1975 Minor Counties Championship against Durham. Gale played Minor counties cricket for Shropshire from 1975 to 1987, which included 108 Minor Counties Championship appearances and 7 MCCA Knockout Trophy appearances. He made his List A debut against Yorkshire in the 1976 Gillette Cup. He made 4 further List A appearances, the last of which came against Northamptonshire in 1985 NatWest Trophy. In his 5 List A matches, he scored 156 runs at an average of 31.20, with a high score of 68. This score, his only List A half century, came against Yorkshire in the 1984 NatWest Trophy, which was vital a vital contribution to Shropshire's famous victory. He served as Shropshire's club captain in 1985 and also played for Shrewsbury Cricket Club.

Gale is currently an umpire, standing in first-class, List A, and Twenty20 matches.
