= Michael Hogan (cricketer) =

Australian-English cricketer

Personal information
- Full name: Michael Garry Hogan
- Born: 31 May 1981 (age 45); Newcastle, New South Wales, Australia
- Nickname: Hoges
- Height: 1.95 m (6 ft 5 in)
- Batting: Right-handed
- Bowling: Right-arm fast-medium
- Role: Bowler

Domestic team information
- Years: Team
- 2009/10–2015/16: Western Australia
- 2011/12–2012/13: Hobart Hurricanes
- 2013–2022: Glamorgan (squad no. 31)
- 2022: Southern Brave
- 2023: Kent (squad no. 31)
- FC debut: 17 November 2009 WA v Victoria
- LA debut: 11 October 2009 WA v Queensland

Career statistics
Competition	FC	LA	T20
Matches	193	79	129
Runs scored	2,546	187	84
Batting average	16.11	18.70	8.40
100s/50s	0/4	0/0	0/0
Top score	57	27	17*
Balls bowled	38,341	3,959	2,645
Wickets	695	118	154
Bowling average	25.06	27.27	23.21
5 wickets in innings	25	1	2
10 wickets in match	2	0	0
Best bowling	7/92	5/44	5/17
Catches/stumpings	87/–	28/–	52/–
- Source: Cricinfo, 13 October 2023

Michael Garry Hogan (born 31 May 1981) is an Australian former professional cricketer who played for Glamorgan and Kent County Cricket Clubs in English domestic cricket, and for Western Australia and the Hobart Hurricanes in Australia.

Born in Newcastle, New South Wales, Hogan originally played in local grade cricket matches, eventually moving to the Sydney grade cricket competition. A right-arm fast bowler, he was recruited to Western Australia prior to the 2009–10 season, and went on to make his debut in the first match of that season. A regular in Western Australia's first-class team from that season onwards, Hogan soon became one of the state's leading fast bowlers, taking 46 wickets in the 2011–12 season of the Sheffield Shield to finish second in the competition's wicket-taking. Holding dual Australian and British citizenship, in March 2012 he signed to play county cricket for Glamorgan.

== Domestic career ==
Hogan was born in Newcastle, New South Wales, where he grew up and he made his debut for Merewether in the Newcastle grade cricket competition in 2003, at the age of 23. After playing two seasons with the club he moved to Sydney to play for Northern Districts in the Sydney grade cricket. After one season in Sydney, Hogan returned to Newcastle for the 2006–07 season, and went on to represent New South Wales Country in the 2006–07 National Country Cricket Championships, taking 19 wickets in five matches at an average of 15.95. For the 2008–09 season he again played grade cricket in Sydney, playing two matches for the New South Wales Second XI in the Cricket Australia Cup but failing to progress to the senior team.

Hogan was recruited to Western Australia for the 2009–10 season by the team's coach at the time, Tom Moody. He made his List A debut for Western Australia against Queensland in the first game of the 2009–10 Ford Ranger One-Day Cup, taking 1/31 off 10 overs. He went on to play seven further one-day matches for the season, taking six wickets at an average of 51.83. However, Hogan was more successful in the Sheffield Shield, playing seven matches and taking 23 wickets at an average of 30.91, with a best of 5/83 against South Australia. He also played three Twenty20 matches, taking two wickets. Hogan became one of Western Australia's leading fast bowlers for the 2010–11 season after Ben Edmondson moved interstate, Brett Dorey and Steve Magoffin were injured, and Ashley Noffke retired. He played ten Sheffield Shield matches, taking 31 wickets at an average of 33.96, including a haul of 6/70 against Tasmania. He also took 15 wickets in nine matches in the one-day competition, which included one five-wicket haul—5/44 against Victoria. At the end of the season, Hogan was awarded the Lawrie Sawle Medal for Western Australia's "most outstanding" player in domestic matches. Hogan signed for the Hobart Hurricanes in the Big Bash League for the 2011–12 season.

In March 2012, Hogan announced he had signed a three-year contract to play for Glamorgan, the only Wales-based team in English county cricket. Western Australia's captain at the time, Marcus North, was Glamorgan's overseas player for the previous season, and recommended him to the team's coach, Matthew Mott. Qualifying for Glamorgan as the holder of British citizenship by descent (through his mother), Hogan was originally scheduled to play for the team in the last two months of the 2012 English season, but a change in Cricket Australia regulations meant he would have had to play any Australian domestic matches as an overseas player. He decided to postpone playing for Glamorgan until the 2013 English season, thus retaining eligibility to play as a non-overseas player for the remainder of the season in Australia. In July 2012, Hogan re-signed with the Hobart Hurricanes.

In his first season of county cricket, Hogan took a total of 103 wickets, including 67 in the County Championship. He also took Glamorgan's Player of the Year award and was shortlisted for the PCA's Player of the Year award. His successful season prompted Glamorgan to give him a contract to the end to the 2016 season, which was then extended by another two seasons in 2015.

Hogan continued to play for Western Australia until announcing his retirement from Australian cricket at the end of the 2015–16 season. He holds the record for the most runs made at the number 11 batting position in the Sheffield Shield with 599 runs, and also the WA 10th wicket partnership record of 94, with Ashton Agar.
