= Lukas Carey =

Welsh cricketer (born 1997)

Personal information
- Full name: Lukas John Carey
- Born: 17 July 1997 (age 29); Carmarthen, Wales
- Batting: Right-handed
- Bowling: Right-arm fast-medium
- Role: Bowler

Domestic team information
- Years: Team
- 2016–2022: Glamorgan (squad no. 17)
- First-class debut: 3 August 2016 Glamorgan v Northamptonshire
- List A debut: 27 April 2017 Glamorgan v Gloucestershire

Career statistics
Competition	FC	LA	T20
Matches	33	28	9
Runs scored	631	175	7
Batting average	15.77	29.16	7.00
100s/50s	0/3	0/0	0/0
Top score	62*	39	5
Balls bowled	5,145	1,194	138
Wickets	87	24	4
Bowling average	34.58	46.12	52.25
5 wickets in innings	0	0	0
10 wickets in match	0	0	0
Best bowling	4/54	2/24	1/15
Catches/stumpings	5/–	4/–	2/–
- Source: ESPNcricinfo, 25 September 2021

Lukas John Carey (born 17 July 1997) is a Welsh cricketer who plays for Glamorgan County Cricket Club. Primarily a right-arm fast-medium bowler, he also bats right handed. He made his List A debut for Glamorgan in the 2017 Royal London One-Day Cup on 27 April 2017. He made his Twenty20 debut for Glamorgan in the 2017 NatWest t20 Blast on 30 July 2017.
