= Andrew Salter (cricketer) =

Welsh cricketer (born 1993)

Personal information
- Full name: Andrew Graham Salter
- Born: 1 June 1993 (age 33); Haverfordwest, Pembrokeshire, Wales
- Nickname: Salts
- Batting: Right-handed
- Bowling: Right-arm off break
- Role: Bowler

Domestic team information
- Years: Team
- 2012–2023: Glamorgan (squad no. 21)
- 2012–2014: Cardiff MCCU
- First-class debut: 31 March 2012 Cardiff MCCU v Somerset
- List A debut: 12 August 2012 Glamorgan v Durham

Career statistics
Competition	FC	LA	T20
Matches	82	48	96
Runs scored	2,297	472	388
Batting average	23.20	22.47	12.93
100s/50s	0/9	0/1	0/0
Top score	90	51	39*
Balls bowled	11,241	1,744	1,446
Wickets	134	30	67
Bowling average	45.91	50.13	29.94
5 wickets in innings	1	0	0
10 wickets in match	0	0	0
Best bowling	7/45	3/37	4/12
Catches/stumpings	38/–	14/–	26/–
- Source: CricketArchive, 4 August 2023

Andrew Graham Salter (born 1 June 1993) is a Welsh former cricketer. Salter was a right-handed batsman who bowled right-arm off break. He was born at Haverfordwest, Pembrokeshire, and was educated at Milford Haven School.

Salter made his debut in county cricket for Wales Minor Counties against Wiltshire in the 2010 MCCA Knockout Trophy, and in that same season he made his debut in the Minor Counties Championship against Devon. In early 2011, he played four Youth One Day Internationals for England Under-19s against Sri Lanka Under-19s during England Under-19s tour there. While studying for a Higher National Diploma in Sport Coaching & Development at Cardiff Metropolitan University, Salter made his first-class debut for Cardiff MCC University in the team's inaugural appearance in first-class cricket against Somerset at Taunton Vale Sports Club Ground in 2012. He featured in a second first-class appearance in that season for Cardiff MCCU against Warwickshire at Edgbaston. He made his debut in county cricket for Glamorgan in a List A match against Durham in the 2012 Clydesdale Bank 40, making a further appearance in that competition against Nottinghamshire.

Salter managed to take a wicket with his first career ball in the County Championship when he had Leicestershire's Shiv Thakor caught behind. In April 2022, in the opening round of matches in the 2022 County Championship, Salter took his maiden five-wicket haul in first-class cricket, with 7 for 45 against Durham.

Salter retired from professional cricket at the end of the 2023 season, after 11 years playing for Glamorgan.
