= Graham Wagg =

English cricketer

Personal information
- Full name: Graham Grant Wagg
- Born: 28 April 1983 (age 43); Rugby, Warwickshire, England
- Nickname: Waggy
- Height: 6 ft 0 in (1.83 m)
- Batting: Right-handed
- Bowling: Left-arm medium

Domestic team information
- Years: Team
- 2000–2004: Warwickshire
- 2005–2010: Derbyshire (squad no. 10)
- 2011–2020: Glamorgan (squad no. 8)
- 2021: Shropshire

Career statistics
Competition	FC	LA	T20
Matches	164	140	144
Runs scored	5,904	2,060	1,359
Batting average	26.83	20.39	18.12
100s/50s	5/33	0/5	0/4
Top score	200	68	62
Balls bowled	27,594	5,453	2,415
Wickets	465	156	129
Bowling average	34.48	34.49	26.00
5 wickets in innings	12	0	1
10 wickets in match	1	0	0
Best bowling	6/29	4/35	5/14
Catches/stumpings	54/–	45/–	38/–
- Source: Cricinfo, 20 September 2020

Graham Grant Wagg (born 28 April 1983) is an English cricketer who most recently played for Glamorgan, having been at Warwickshire and Derbyshire.

Wagg made his debut as a lower-order batsman for Warwickshire's Second XI in August 1999. He made his first-class debut in 2002, and finished the season at the top of the bowling averages.

Wagg has played three youth Test matches, against India Under-19s in July 2002, making his debut in the same match as Gordon Muchall's innings of 254. His first Youth ODI followed a month later, against India. Since 2003, Wagg has played Twenty20 cricket, including a Twenty20 Cup final against Surrey.

Wagg spent calendar year 2005 out of the game following allegations of his use of cocaine, and was released by Warwickshire, signing for Derbyshire for 2006 on a one-year contract. His comeback season was solid and he played in just over half of the county's Championship games. He was much better in 2007 taking 50 wickets for the first time and scoring four 50s. Consequently, he earned a new two-year contract at the club. His all-round progress continued in 2008 when he took 59 first-class wickets and scored a century and two fifties. After a limited 2010 season, he moved to Glamorgan.

On 14 October 2020, it was announced that Wagg would leave Glamorgan after ten seasons with the Cardiff-based club. He was recruited to Glamorgan by coach Matthew Maynard in 2011 and was a regular selection for the vast majority of his decade at the club, having a testimonial in 2019.

== See also ==
- List of sportspeople sanctioned for doping offences
