= Kieran Bull =

Welsh cricketer (born 1995)

Personal information
- Full name: Kieran Andrew Bull
- Born: 5 April 1995 (age 31); Haverfordwest, Wales
- Batting: Right-handed
- Bowling: Right-arm off break
- Role: Bowler

Domestic team information
- Years: Team
- 2014–2020: Glamorgan (squad no. 11)
- 2015: Cardiff MCCU
- First-class debut: 31 August 2014 Glamorgan v Kent
- List A debut: 17 August 2015 Glamorgan v Middlesex

Career statistics
Competition	FC	LA
Matches	16	2
Runs scored	202	–
Batting average	9.61	–
100s/50s	0/0	–/–
Top score	31	–
Balls bowled	2,089	52
Wickets	31	1
Bowling average	42.67	48.00
5 wickets in innings	0	0
10 wickets in match	0	0
Best bowling	4/62	1/40
Catches/stumpings	5/–	0/–
- Source: ESPNcricinfo, 25 August 2020

Kieran Andrew Bull (born 5 April 1995) is a Welsh professional cricketer who played for Glamorgan County Cricket Club. He is an off spinner. He was born at Haverfordwest in Pembrokeshire. Bull was released by Glamorgan ahead of the 2021 County Championship.
