= Nick Selman =

English cricketer

Personal information
- Full name: Nicholas James Selman
- Born: 18 October 1995 (age 31); Brisbane, Queensland, Australia
- Batting: Right-handed
- Bowling: Right-arm medium
- Role: Opening batsman

Domestic team information
- Years: Team
- 2016–2021: Glamorgan (squad no. 9)
- First-class debut: 8 May 2016 Glamorgan v Worcestershire
- List A debut: 15 July 2016 Glamorgan v Pakistan A

Career statistics
Competition	FC	LA	T20
Matches	61	19	24
Runs scored	2,863	663	526
Batting average	26.75	39.00	26.30
100s/50s	7/14	1/3	0/3
Top score	150	140	78
Balls bowled	45	–	–
Wickets	1	–	–
Bowling average	36.00	–	–
5 wickets in innings	0	–	–
10 wickets in match	0	–	–
Best bowling	1/22	–	–
Catches/stumpings	67/–	12/–	9/–
- Source: Cricinfo, 25 September 2021

Nicholas James Selman (born 18 October 1995) is an Australian-English cricketer. Born in Brisbane, he earned youth representative honours for Queensland at both cricket and Australian rules football before choosing to make cricket his primary sport. In an attempt to start his professional career, he moved to England for the 2014 cricket season and played club cricket for Tunbridge Wells CC. Meanwhile, he was spotted by Kent and made four second eleven appearances for them in the second half of the season. He made five further appearances for the Kent 2nds in the first half of 2015, before a pair of trial matches for the Gloucestershire and Glamorgan 2nd teams. Having made half-centuries in each innings of his trial game with Glamorgan, he made a permanent move to the Welsh county in November 2015 and made his first-class debut in a 2016 County Championship match at home to Worcestershire on 8 May 2016. Glamorgan announced in October 2021 that he would leave the club to return to Australia.

Selman holds dual passport.
