= Colin Ingram =

South African cricketer (born 1985)

Personal information
- Full name: Colin Alexander Ingram
- Born: 3 July 1985 (age 41); Port Elizabeth, Cape Province, South Africa
- Batting: Left-handed
- Bowling: Right arm leg spin
- Role: Batter

International information
- National side: South Africa (2010–2013)
- ODI debut (cap 99): 15 October 2010 v Zimbabwe
- Last ODI: 1 November 2013 v Pakistan
- ODI shirt no.: 41
- T20I debut (cap 46): 8 October 2010 v Zimbabwe
- Last T20I: 30 March 2012 v India
- T20I shirt no.: 41

Domestic team information
- Years: Team
- 2004/05–2005/06: Free State
- 2005/06–2008/09: Eastern Province
- 2006/07–2017/18: Warriors
- 2011: Delhi Daredevils (squad no. 67)
- 2014: Somerset
- 2015–2026: Glamorgan
- 2017/18–2018/19: Adelaide Strikers
- 2018–2019, 2021: Karachi Kings
- 2018: Trinbago Knight Riders
- 2018: Boost Defenders
- 2018: Kabul Zwanan
- 2019: Delhi Capitals (squad no. 67)
- 2019: St Lucia Zouks
- 2020: Islamabad United (squad no. 38)
- 2020/21: Hobart Hurricanes
- 2022: Sylhet Sunrisers (squad no. 42)
- 2022: Guyana Amazon Warriors

Career statistics
Competition	ODI	T20I	FC	LA
Matches	31	9	160	208
Runs scored	843	210	10,725	8,527
Batting average	32.42	26.25	41.89	48.17
100s/50s	3/3	0/1	28/48	21/53
Top score	124	78	257*	155
Balls bowled	6	–	3,896	1,620
Wickets	0	–	56	43
Bowling average	–	–	41.98	35.39
5 wickets in innings	–	–	0	0
10 wickets in match	–	–	0	0
Best bowling	–	–	4/16	4/39
Catches/stumpings	12/–	2/–	124/0	78/0
- Source: CricketArchive, 27 September 2026

Colin Alexander Ingram (born 3 July 1985) is a retired South African cricketer who played for Glamorgan, as well as internationally for South Africa in One Day (ODI) and Twenty20 Internationals (T20I). Considered by some to be a Glamorgan great, he holds the record as the longest serving overseas player of the 21st century.

== Early life ==
Ingram was born in Port Elizabeth. He attended Woodridge College in the Eastern Cape where he was their star cricketer in his years there. He played for the college for five years, captaining the team in three of them. He made his school First XI debut at the age of 14 and continued to play at this level throughout the rest of his high school career. He played provincial cricket for the Eastern Province team and was also selected for the South African schools team.

Ingram accepted a scholarship to study at the University of the Free State in 2004. He enjoyed a successful stint in the university team before leaving to return to the Eastern Cape.

== First class, domestic & club cricket ==
Ingram struggled for a batting spot in the Eastern Province originally, but soon after he gained experience from both County Cricket, and some playing time for Eastern Province, his skills increased with each innings played.

It was announced on 21 November 2014 that Ingram had signed a three-year contract with Glamorgan as a Kolpak player subject to clearance from Cricket South Africa, the ECB and him obtaining a visa. He had a very successful one day season with Glamorgan in 2015 scoring 405 runs in 8 matches at an average of 81 including three centuries and one 50. His Championship season was steady rather than spectacular as he scored 931 runs at 37.24 with two centuries and four 50s.

Ingram was named Glamorgan's player of the season in 2024 after scoring 2,001 runs across all three formats, and signed a new two-year contract extending his stay to 2026, when he retired.

=== Warriors ===
Ingram played for the Chevrolet Warriors in South African domestic cricket and he was previously captain of this team. He participated in the 2010 Champions League Twenty20, scoring well and assisting his team to reach the final. During the 2015 One Day Cup he almost took Warriors to the final in Cape Town against Cape Cobras, but they were beaten on the net run-rate by the Titans. He scored 93, 106 not out and 90 not out consecutively. The 90 was made in a thrilling South African domestic one day record-breaking run chase against Lions in a match that was played in Buffalo Park, East London.

=== Twenty20 Leagues ===
As well as playing for Warriors and Glamorgan, Ingram has had some success in Twenty20 leagues, having appeared in the IPL, Big Bash League, Pakistan Super League, Caribbean Premier League and Afghanistan Premier League. He is the first captain to win the Bat Toss conducted by Mathew Hayden for Adelaide Strikers against Brisbane Heat in the Big Bash League.

In September 2018, he was named in Kabul's squad in the first edition of the Afghanistan Premier League tournament. In December 2018, he was bought by the Delhi Capitals in the player auction for the 2019 Indian Premier League. On 24 February 2019, he became the first player of the team Karachi Kings to score a century, as well as the highest individual scorer in Pakistan Super League at that time.

In July 2019, he was selected to play for the Belfast Titans in the inaugural edition of the Euro T20 Slam cricket tournament. However, the following month the tournament was cancelled. He was released by the Delhi Capitals ahead of the 2020 IPL auction. Ahead of the 2020 PSL Draft, he was released by Karachi Kings, he played for two years with the franchise. In December 2019, he was drafted by Islamabad United as second pick of the Platinum Category round at the 2020 PSL draft. In July 2020, he was named in the St Lucia Zouks squad for the 2020 Caribbean Premier League. However, Ingram was one of five South African cricketers to miss the tournament, after failing to confirm travel arrangements in due time.

In October 2020, he was drafted by the Galle Gladiators for the inaugural edition of the Lanka Premier League.

== International career ==
Ingram made his Twenty20 International debut against Zimbabwe during Zimbabwe's tour of South Africa in 2010, playing in both matches. He didn't bat for long, scoring a total of 15 runs in the two-match series (3 & 12) as South Africa registered victories in both matches. He made his mark on his ODI debut in the ODI series against Zimbabwe that followed by scoring a century (124), only the sixth person to score a century on debut and the first South African ever to achieve this honour.
