= Timm van der Gugten =

Dutch cricketer

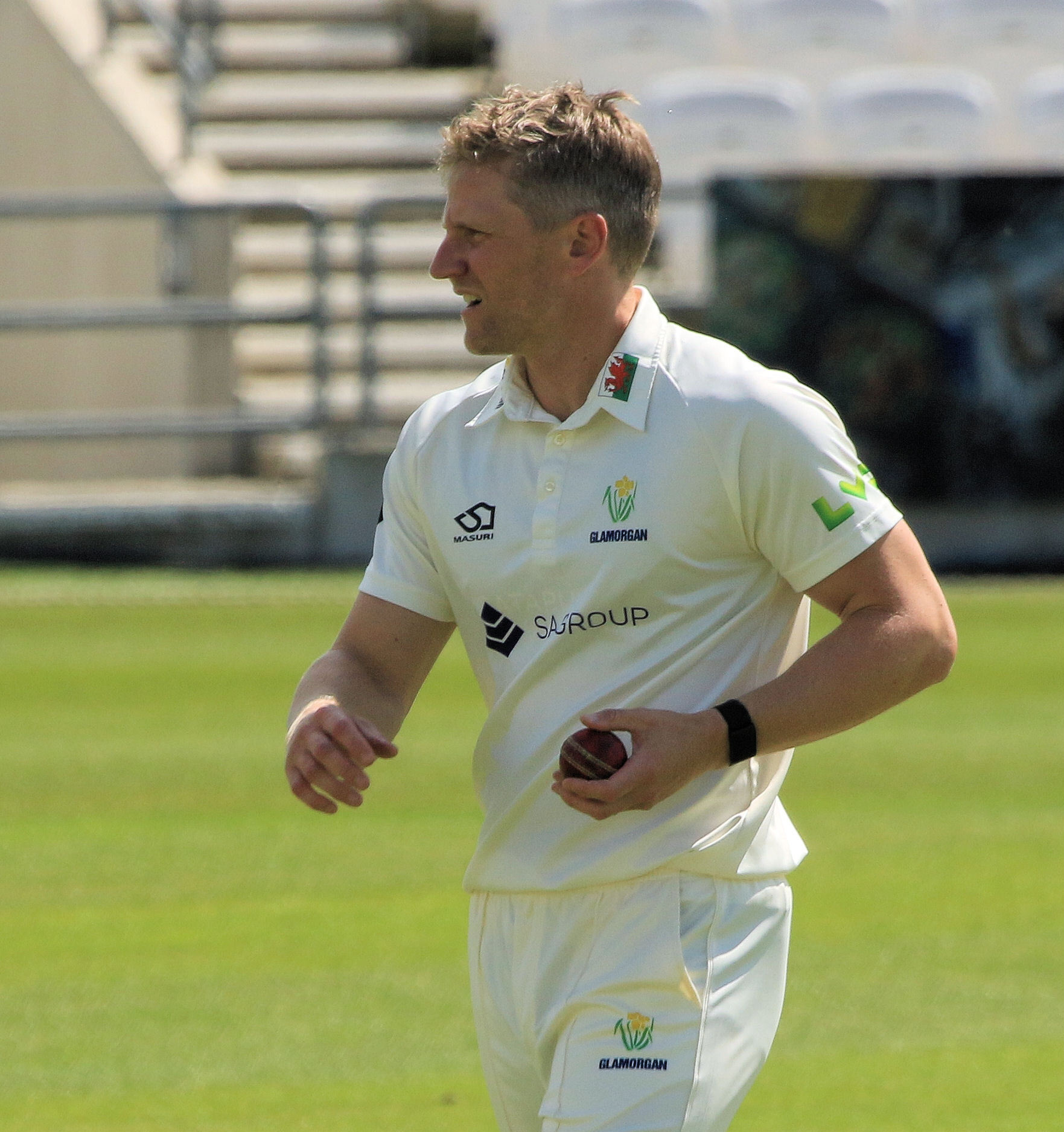
- van der Gugten in 2023

Personal information
- Full name: Timm van der Gugten
- Born: 25 February 1991 (age 35); Hornsby, New South Wales, Australia
- Height: 1.87 m (6 ft 2 in)
- Batting: Right-handed
- Bowling: Right-arm fast-medium
- Role: Bowler

International information
- National side: Netherlands (2012–present)
- ODI debut (cap 56): 29 March 2012 v Afghanistan
- Last ODI: 13 March 2025 v Namibia
- ODI shirt no.: 10
- T20I debut (cap 25): 13 March 2012 v Canada
- Last T20I: 10 February 2026 v Namibia
- T20I shirt no.: 10

Domestic team information
- Years: Team
- 2011/12: New South Wales
- 2012/13: Tasmania
- 2014/15: Hobart Hurricanes
- 2015/16: Northern Districts
- 2016–present: Glamorgan
- 2021: Trent Rockets
- 2022: Birmingham Phoenix

Career statistics
Competition	ODI	T20I	FC	LA
Matches	15	50	114	87
Runs scored	118	168	2,412	800
Batting average	16.85	16.80	20.44	22.85
100s/50s	0/0	0/0	0/12	1/0
Top score	49	40*	85*	118*
Balls bowled	552	925	19,611	3,929
Wickets	14	52	362	99
Bowling average	22.21	22.51	27.43	32.52
5 wickets in innings	1	0	16	2
10 wickets in match	0	0	1	0
Best bowling	5/24	3/9	7/42	5/24
Catches/stumpings	1/–	12/–	27/–	15/–
- Source: CricketArchive, 27 September 2026

Timm van der Gugten (born 25 February 1991) is an Australian–Dutch international cricketer who made his debut for the Netherlands national team in January 2012. He was born in Australia, and has also played for several teams in Australian domestic cricket.

Born in Sydney, van der Gugten made his first-class debut for New South Wales in November 2011. He was called up to the Dutch senior team early the following year, for the 2011–12 Caribbean Twenty20, and subsequently made his One Day International (ODI) and Twenty20 International debuts in March 2012, aged 21. A right-arm pace bowler, van der Gugten has been a regular for the Netherlands since his debut, and represented the team at the 2014 World Twenty20. At domestic level, he switched to Tasmania for the 2012–13 Australian season, and has also made appearances for two Twenty20 franchises – the Hobart Hurricanes in Australia's Big Bash League and the Northern Knights in New Zealand's Georgie Pie Super Smash.

== Early life and domestic career ==
Van der Gugten was born in Sydney to a Dutch immigrant father. He holds a Dutch passport, but in a 2014 Daily Telegraph article was described as "speak[ing] very little Dutch". Educated at St Pius X College, van der Gugten made his first-grade debut for the University of NSW Cricket Club at the age of 15, in November 2006. At the time of his debut, only six players had appeared in first-grade Sydney Grade Cricket at an earlier age.

A former state under-17s and under-19s player, van der Gugten made his Futures League debut for the New South Wales under-23s in September 2010, aged 19. His first-class debut for the senior state team came in November 2011, in a Sheffield Shield fixture against Western Australia. Van der Gugten played two further matches in his debut season (a Ryobi One-Day Cup game and a second Shield fixture), but for the 2012–13 season switched to Tasmania. He made his debut for that team in February 2013, playing two Ryobi One-Day Cup matches. However, van der Gugten made no senior appearances for Tasmania over the following two seasons, and eventually lost his Tasmanian contract prior to the 2015–16 season.

Van der Gugten signed with the Sydney Thunder for the inaugural 2011–12 edition of the Big Bash League, but did not play a game. He switched to the Hobart Hurricanes the following season, but did not make his debut until the 2014–15 edition, playing a single match against the Adelaide Strikers. In November 2015, van der Gugten signed with the Northern Knights, a franchise in New Zealand's Georgie Pie Super Smash. He replaced the injured Ben Laughlin as one of the team's two international players for the 2015–16 season, and took two wickets from his three matches.

In February 2016, van der Gugten signed a three-year contract with Glamorgan in English county cricket.

He was signed by Trent Rockets for the first season of The Hundred.

Van der Gugten signed a three-year contract extension with Glamorgan in September 2024. He played his 100 match for the club in May 2026. Van der Gugten made his first List A century for Glamorgan against Essex on 7 August 2026, scoring 118 not out in a One-Day Cup match at Sophia Gardens in Cardiff.

== International career ==
Van der Gugten first played for the Netherlands in January 2012, when the team appeared as guests at the 2011–12 Caribbean Twenty20. He took six wickets from four matches, including 5/21 against Sussex (another invitational team), and was retained in the Dutch squad for the 2015 World Twenty20 Qualifier two months later. At the World Twenty20 Qualifier, van der Gugten took five wickets from six games (with a best of 4/22 against Bermuda), and also made his Twenty20 International debut, which came against Canada. Later in 2012, he also made his first-class and One Day International (ODI) debuts for the Netherlands, which came against the United Arab Emirates and Afghanistan, respectively.

In an Intercontinental Cup match against Namibia in April 2013, van der Gugten took figures of 7/68 and 3/53, recording his first five-wicket haul and ten-wicket haul in first-class cricket. Later in the year, in an ODI against Canada that was part of the World Cricket League Championship, he took the first five Canadian wickets to fall, leaving the team at 7/5. He eventually finished with figures of 5/24 from nine overs, becoming the first Dutchman to take an ODI five-wicket haul. Van der Gugten continued his good form at the 2014 World Twenty20, taking nine wickets from seven matches (behind only Ahsan Malik for the Netherlands, and eighth overall). Notable performances at the tournament included 3/30 against New Zealand and 1/11 (from three overs) in the upset win against England.

In June 2015, van der Gugten took 6/29 in an Intercontinental Cup game against Papua New Guinea. The following month, he played for the Netherlands at the 2015 World Twenty20 Qualifier, helping the team to qualify for the 2016 World Twenty20 in India.

Following the conclusion of the 2018 Cricket World Cup Qualifier tournament, the International Cricket Council (ICC) named van der Gugten as the rising star of the Netherlands' squad.

In September 2019, he was named in the Dutch squad for the 2019 ICC T20 World Cup Qualifier tournament in the United Arab Emirates. In September 2021, he was named in the Dutch squad for the 2021 ICC Men's T20 World Cup.
