= Owen Morgan (cricketer) =

Welsh cricketer

Personal information
- Full name: Alun Owen Morgan
- Born: 14 April 1994 (age 32); Swansea, Wales
- Batting: Right-handed
- Bowling: Slow left-arm orthodox
- Role: All-rounder

Domestic team information
- Years: Team
- 2014–2016: Cardiff MCCU
- 2016–2020: Glamorgan (squad no. 29)
- FC debut: 7 April 2014 Cardiff MCCU v Gloucestershire
- LA debut: 15 July 2016 Glamorgan v Pakistan A

Career statistics
Competition	FC	LA	T20
Matches	22	3	9
Runs scored	666	32	59
Batting average	20.18	16.00	9.83
100s/50s	1/1	0/0	0/0
Top score	103*	29	24
Balls bowled	1,956	84	30
Wickets	16	2	0
Bowling average	65.37	40.50	–
5 wickets in innings	0	0	–
10 wickets in match	0	0	–
Best bowling	2/37	2/49	–
Catches/stumpings	6/–	0/–	1/–
- Source: CricketArchive, 20 September 2020

Alun Owen Morgan (born 14 April 1994) is a Welsh cricketer who played for Glamorgan County Cricket Club. Primarily a slow left-arm orthodox bowler, he also bats right handed. He made his T20 debut on 18 July 2019, for Glamorgan against Somerset, in the 2019 t20 Blast. Morgan was released by Glamorgan ahead of the 2021 County Championship.
