= Glamorgan County Cricket Club in 2023 =

Glamorgan County Cricket Club
2023 season
- Coach: (Wales) Matthew Maynard
- Captain: (Wales) David Lloyd
- Overseas player: (Australia) Marnus Labuschagne (Australia) Michael Neser (South Africa) Colin Ingram (Australia) Peter Hatzoglou (T20) (New Zealand) Cam Fletcher (T20) (Australia) Mitchell Swepson (FC)
- Ground(s): Sophia Gardens, Cardiff; The Gnoll, Neath
- County Championship: 5th, Division 2
- One-Day Cup: 4th, Group B
- T20 Blast: 8th, South Group
- Most runs: FC: Kiran Carlson (1,068); LA: Eddie Byrom (352); T20: Chris Cooke (419)
- Most wickets: FC: Timm van der Gugten (39); LA: Ben Kellaway (13); T20: Jamie McIlroy (19)
- Most catches: FC: 4 players (7); LA: Andy Gorvin (4); T20: 2 players (7)
- Most wicket-keeping dismissals: FC: Chris Cooke (38 ct + 2 st); LA: Alex Horton (1 ct + 2 st); T20: Chris Cooke (6 ct + 2 st)

The 2023 season was Glamorgan County Cricket Club's 136th year in existence and their 103rd as a first-class cricket county. They competed in the Second Division of the County Championship, as well as Group B of the One-Day Cup and the South Group of the T20 Blast. Just two of their fourteen County Championship matches produced results (one win and one loss), meaning they finished in fifth place in the eight-team division; meanwhile, they failed to capitalise on a good start in the T20 Blast, winning four of their first five matches before losing eight of their next nine to finish eighth out of the nine teams in the South Group. In the One-Day Cup, they failed to put together any consistent form; they won four of their eight matches, finishing in fourth place, three points behind Gloucestershire and Worcestershire in quarter-final places. Glamorgan played two 50-over matches at The Gnoll in Neath for the second year in a row, while also not returning to Penrhyn Avenue in Rhos-on-Sea for the fourth year in a row.

It was the team's fourth season with Matthew Maynard as their red-ball head coach and their second with David Lloyd as captain; both left at the end of the season, with Maynard stepping down and Lloyd moving to Derbyshire. Former Gloucestershire and England all-rounder Mark Alleyne joined the club as white-ball head coach, but his appointment as an assistant coach for the Welsh Fire in The Hundred meant Glamorgan turned to David Harrison to coach the side in the One-Day Cup. The team's overseas players were Australians Marnus Labuschagne and Michael Neser, and South African Colin Ingram; Australian Peter Hatzoglou and New Zealander Cam Fletcher also joined for the T20 Blast, while Australian Mitchell Swepson was brought in while Neser was on international duty with Australia for the 2023 Ashes series.

== Pre-season and friendlies ==
Glamorgan's pre-season campaign took place in Zimbabwe, where they played a three-day match and a one-day match against Northerns, and three one-day matches against Southerns. On returning, they played a three-day game against Somerset at Taunton, before hosting Cardiff MCCU in another three-day match. They also played a one-day match against Herefordshire before the start of the One-Day Cup season, but it was rained off midway through the first innings.

=== Northerns (Zimbabwe) v Glamorgan (4–6 March) ===
4–6 March
Scorecard

Northerns (Zimbabwe)	v	Glamorgan
266 (90.2 overs); Joylord Gumbie 140 (252); Timm van der Gugten 2/13 (8 overs)		214 (62 overs); Billy Root 50 (81); Ernest Masuku 2/28 (7 overs)
105 (27.3 overs); Joylord Gumbie 25 (30); Timm van der Gugten 3/8 (5 overs)		161/7 (45.4 overs); Eddie Byrom 42 (85); Ainsley Ndlovu 3/59 (20 overs)

Glamorgan won by 3 wickets
Old Hararians, Harare
Umpires: Christopher Phiri and Tafadzwa Musakwa

- Northerns (Zimbabwe) won the toss and elected to bat.
- Northerns (Zimbabwe) used 14 players and Glamorgan used 18 players (both 11 batting, 11 fielding)

=== Southerns v Glamorgan (8 March) ===
8 March
Scorecard

Glamorgan; 172/5 (20 overs)	v	Southerns; 115 (17.2 overs)
Sam Northeast 76 (49); Luke Jongwe 2/33 (4 overs)		Cephas Zhuwao 23 (18); Dan Douthwaite 3/8 (2.2 overs)

Glamorgan won by 57 runs
Harare Sports Club, Harare
Umpires: Collin Tlou and Iknow Chabi

- Southerns won the toss and elected to field.
- 12 players per side (11 batting, 11 fielding)

=== Northerns (Zimbabwe) v Glamorgan (9 March) ===
9 March
Scorecard

Northerns (Zimbabwe); 122 (19.1 overs)	v	Glamorgan; 124/7 (20 overs)
Tony Munyonga 31 (34); Timm van der Gugten 4/14 (3.1 overs)		Zain-ul-Hassan 39* (37); Wessly Madhevere 2/16 (4 overs)

Glamorgan won by 3 wickets
Harare Sports Club, Harare
Umpires: Christopher Phiri and Oscar Tafirenyika

- Northerns (Zimbabwe) won the toss and elected to bat.
- 12 players per side (11 batting, 11 fielding)

=== Southerns v Glamorgan (10 March) ===
10 March
Scorecard

Southerns; 129/9 (20 overs)	v	Glamorgan; 130/2 (12 overs)
Roy Kaia 30* (36); Jamie McIlroy 2/5 (3 overs)		Chris Cooke 62* (33); Roy Kaia 1/21 (3 overs)

Glamorgan won by 8 wickets
Harare Sports Club, Harare
Umpires: Collin Tlou and Percival Sizara

- Southerns won the toss and elected to bat.
- 12 players per side (11 batting, 11 fielding)

=== Southerns v Glamorgan (12 March) ===
12 March
Scorecard

Glamorgan; 321 (49.5 overs)	v	Southerns; 262 (46.2 overs)
Dan Douthwaite 70 (39); Ainsley Ndlovu 3/49 (10 overs)		Gary Ballance 62 (62); Prem Sisodiya 3/54 (10 overs)

Glamorgan won by 59 runs
Harare Sports Club, Harare
Umpires: Forster Mutizwa and Walter Musakwa

- Glamorgan won the toss and elected to bat.
- 15 players per side (11 batting, 11 fielding)

=== Glamorgan v Somerset (27–29 March) ===
27–29 March
Report

Glamorgan	v	Somerset
283/5d (50 overs); Eddie Byrom 71 (64); Craig Overton 2/27 (9 overs)		231/7d (47.4 overs); Steven Davies 61 (63); Harry Podmore 3/64 (11 overs)
149/8d (26.1 overs); Sam Northeast 56 (68); Josh Davey 2/24 (8 overs)		63/1 (16 overs); Andrew Umeed 30 (35); Dan Douthwaite 1/5 (3 overs)

Match drawn
County Ground, Taunton
Umpires: Ian Blackwell and Ben Peverall

- Toss uncontested
- Play on day 1 was delayed by an hour due to rain.
- Play on day 2 was not possible until 15:30 due to rain.
- Play on day 3 was reduced to 33 overs due to rain.

=== MCC University Match: Glamorgan v Cardiff MCCU (1–3 April) ===
1–3 April
Report

Glamorgan	v	Cardiff MCCU
215 (56.2 overs); David Lloyd 48 (44); Vinayak Raghavan 5/49 (13.2 overs)		170 (49 overs); Chris Gibson 54 (66); Dan Douthwaite 5/31 (7 overs)
228/5 (40 overs); Colin Ingram 63 (72); Vinayak Raghavan 3/73 (13 overs)		275/7 (50.1 overs); Xavier Clarke 110 (103); Andrew Salter 2/40 (7 overs)

Cardiff MCCU won by 3 wickets
Sophia Gardens, Cardiff

- Glamorgan won the toss and elected to bat.
- Play on day 1 was not possible until 15:30 due to rain.
- 13 players per side (11 batting, 11 fielding)

=== Herefordshire v Glamorgan (30 July) ===
30 July
Scorecard

Herefordshire; 93/4 (23.1 overs)	v	Glamorgan
Nick Hammond 27 (55); Ben Kellaway 1/2 (1.1 overs)

Match abandoned
Eastnor Cricket Club, Ledbury
Umpires: Sue Redfern and John Farrell

- Glamorgan won the toss and elected to field.
- Rain stopped play after 23.1 overs of the Herefordshire innings.

== County Championship ==
=== Matches ===
==== Glamorgan v Gloucestershire (6–9 April) ====
6–9 April
Scorecard

Gloucestershire	v	Glamorgan
165 (60.5 overs); Marcus Harris 59 (129); Timm van der Gugten 5/26 (17 overs)		404 (108.2 overs); Billy Root 117* (179); Tom Price 4/56 (23.2 overs)
569/7d (138 overs); Marcus Harris 148 (192); Timm van der Gugten 2/89 (28 overs)		110/3 (37 overs); Billy Root 39* (87); Tom Price 2/21 (5 overs)

Match drawn
Sophia Gardens, Cardiff
Umpires: Mark Newell and Steve O'Shaughnessy

- Glamorgan won the toss and elected to field.
- Points: Glamorgan 12, Gloucestershire 8.

==== Glamorgan v Durham (20–23 April) ====
20–23 April
Scorecard

Durham	v	Glamorgan
471/9d (112.3 overs); Brydon Carse 91 (110); Marnus Labuschagne 4/81 (17.3 overs)		305 (79.4 overs); Kiran Carlson 119 (166); Ben Raine 4/65 (23 overs)
		104/6 (f/o) (23 overs); David Lloyd 31 (46); Paul Coughlin 3/27 (8 overs)

Match drawn
Sophia Gardens, Cardiff
Umpires: Neil Mallender and Tom Lungley

- Glamorgan won the toss and elected to field.
- No play was possible on day 2 due to rain.
- Play on day 4 was reduced to 63 overs due to rain.
- Points: Durham 13, Glamorgan 9.

After a week off, Glamorgan returned to action at home to Durham buoyed by the return of their overseas players, Australians Michael Neser and Marnus Labuschagne.

==== Leicestershire v Glamorgan (27–30 April) ====
27–30 April
Scorecard

Leicestershire	v	Glamorgan
407 (107.4 overs); Peter Handscomb 95 (168); Timm van der Gugten 6/88 (29 overs)		465 (158.1 overs); Chris Cooke 132 (257); Chris Wright 5/89 (36.1 overs)
252/3d (64 overs); Rishi Patel 134* (213); David Lloyd 2/32 (9 overs)

Match drawn
Grace Road, Leicester
Umpires: Chris Watts and Neil Bainton

- Glamorgan won the toss and elected to field.
- Points: Leicestershire 11, Glamorgan 10.

==== Yorkshire v Glamorgan (4–7 May) ====
4–7 May
Scorecard

Glamorgan	v	Yorkshire
245 (71.5 overs); Marnus Labuschagne 65 (166); Mickey Edwards 3/54 (18 overs)		106 (31 overs); Jonny Bairstow 20* (34); Michael Neser 7/32 (11 overs)
352/4d (82 overs); Marnus Labuschagne 170* (207); Jordan Thompson 2/68 (20 overs)		412/9 (96 overs); Adam Lyth 174 (220); Timm van der Gugten 4/72 (24 overs)

Match drawn
Headingley Cricket Ground, Leeds
Umpires: Hassan Adnan and Ian Blackwell

- Yorkshire won the toss and elected to field.
- Points: Yorkshire 8, Glamorgan 8.

==== Glamorgan v Worcestershire (11–14 May) ====
11–14 May
Scorecard

Worcestershire	v	Glamorgan
109 (40.3 overs); Gareth Roderick 39 (80); James Harris 4/18 (7.3 overs)		258 (79.4 overs); Michael Neser 86 (120); Adam Finch 5/74 (20 overs)
227 (73 overs); Matthew Waite 45 (79); Timm van der Gugten 5/48 (21 overs)		82/0 (20 overs); Eddie Byrom 51* (55)

Glamorgan won by 10 wickets
Sophia Gardens, Cardiff
Umpires: Rob Bailey and Surendiran Shanmugam

- Glamorgan won the toss and elected to field.
- Points: Glamorgan 20, Worcestershire 3.

==== Sussex v Glamorgan (18–21 May) ====
18–21 May
Scorecard

Glamorgan	v	Sussex
123 (37.4 overs); James Harris 28* (33); Ollie Robinson 4/29 (12 overs)		481 (119.5 overs); James Coles 138 (223); Michael Neser 3/81 (21.5 overs)
737 (207.5 overs); Kiran Carlson 192 (278); Steve Smith 2/55 (10.5 overs)		1/0 (1 over); Ali Orr 1* (4)

Match drawn
County Ground, Hove
Umpires: Martin Saggers and Rob White

- Sussex won the toss and elected to field.
- Zain-ul-Hassan (Glam) made his first-class debut.
- Points: Sussex 12, Glamorgan 7.

==== Durham v Glamorgan (11–14 June) ====
11–14 June
Scorecard

Glamorgan	v	Durham
390 (92.5 overs); Kiran Carlson 162 (213); Craig Miles 4/73 (22 overs)		630 (148.4 overs); David Bedingham 151 (246); Andy Gorvin 3/88 (22.4 overs)
426/7d (118 overs); Chris Cooke 134* (224); Bas de Leede 4/76 (18 overs)

Match drawn
Riverside Ground, Chester-le-Street
Umpires: Neil Pratt and Paul Pollard

- Glamorgan won the toss and elected to bat.
- Points: Durham 13, Glamorgan 10.

==== Glamorgan v Sussex (25–28 June) ====
25–28 June
Scorecard

Glamorgan	v	Sussex
242 (71.5 overs); Billy Root 66 (120); Nathan McAndrew 4/58 (16.5 overs)		203 (89.4 overs); Fynn Hudson-Prentice 59 (118); James Harris 3/38 (17 overs)
319 (102.4 overs); Sam Northeast 104 (193); Nathan McAndrew 4/47 (20 overs)		273/9 (98 overs); Oli Carter 55* (150); Mitchell Swepson 4/89 (38 overs)

Match drawn
Sophia Gardens, Cardiff
Umpires: Hassan Adnan and Neil Bainton

- Glamorgan won the toss and elected to bat.
- Points: Glamorgan 8, Sussex 8.

==== Glamorgan v Leicestershire (10–13 July) ====
10–13 July
Scorecard

Glamorgan	v	Leicestershire
403/9d (98 overs); Michael Neser 176* (202); Matt Salisbury 3/92 (21 overs)		451/6 (92.3 overs); Rishi Patel 179 (237); Zain-ul-Hassan 2/61 (11 overs)

Match drawn
Sophia Gardens, Cardiff
Umpires: Jack Shantry and Paul Baldwin

- Leicestershire won the toss and elected to field.
- No play was possible on day 1 and only 17 overs were possible on day 2 due to rain.
- Points: Leicestershire 13, Glamorgan 11.

==== Gloucestershire v Glamorgan (20–23 July) ====
20–23 July
Scorecard

Glamorgan	v	Gloucestershire
450/6d (92.5 overs); Billy Root 98 (123); Paul van Meekeren 3/92 (21 overs)		402/6d (108.3 overs); Chris Dent 113 (206); Mitchell Swepson 3/142 (37 overs)
62/0d (16 overs); David Lloyd 38* (58)

Match drawn
College Ground, Cheltenham
Umpires: Chris Watts and Neil Pratt

- Glamorgan won the toss and elected to bat.
- No play was possible on day 3 due to rain.
- Points: Glamorgan 12, Gloucestershire 11.

==== Derbyshire v Glamorgan (25–28 July) ====
25–28 July
Scorecard

Glamorgan	v	Derbyshire
521/8d (118 overs); Colin Ingram 136 (200); Luis Reece 2/76 (14 overs)		318 (104.5 overs); Luis Reece 131 (242); Timm van der Gugten 3/94 (28 overs)
		360/0 (f/o) (112 overs); Luis Reece 201* (338)

Match drawn
County Ground, Derby
Umpires: Neil Bainton and Paul Baldwin

- Derbyshire won the toss and elected to field.
- Points: Glamorgan 13, Derbyshire 9.

==== Worcestershire v Glamorgan (3–6 September) ====
3–6 September
Scorecard

Worcestershire	v	Glamorgan
284 (92 overs); Brett D'Oliveira 74 (139); Jamie McIlroy 3/41 (17 overs)		170 (48 overs); Chris Cooke 38 (44); Logan van Beek 4/42 (12 overs)
145 (56.5 overs); Jake Libby 40 (93); Jamie McIlroy 5/34 (15.5 overs)		179 (52.1 overs); Billy Root 84* (100); Logan van Beek 4/46 (12.1 overs)

Worcestershire won by 80 runs
New Road, Worcester
Umpires: Neil Bainton and Surendiran Shanmugam

- Glamorgan won the toss and elected to field.
- Ben Kellaway (Glam) made his first-class debut.
- Points: Worcestershire 4, Glamorgan 3.

==== Glamorgan v Yorkshire (10–13 September) ====
10–13 September
Scorecard

Yorkshire	v	Glamorgan
500 (122 overs); Shan Masood 192 (256); James Harris 3/131 (28 overs)		273 (89.2 overs); Kiran Carlson 64 (89); Matt Revis 5/50 (16.2 overs)
		401/5 (f/o) (118 overs); Sam Northeast 166* (296); Dom Bess 2/112 (41 overs)

Match drawn
Sophia Gardens, Cardiff
Umpires: Mark Newell and Peter Hartley

- Yorkshire won the toss and elected to bat.
- Ben Cliff (Yorks) made his first-class debut.
- Dan Douthwaite (Glam) came on as a substitute for Ben Kellaway after 78 overs of Yorkshire's first innings.
- Points: Yorkshire 10, Glamorgan 7.

==== Glamorgan v Derbyshire (26–29 September) ====
26–29 September
Scorecard

Derbyshire	v	Glamorgan
450/8d (127 overs); Luis Reece 139 (276); James Harris		301/5d (81.5 overs); Colin Ingram 82 (97); Alex Thomson 4/97 (21.5 overs)
234/2d (44.3 overs); Luis Reece 119* (125); Kiran Carlson 2/55 (14.3 overs)		135/6 (69 overs); Eddie Byrom 32 (49); Zak Chappell 2/19 (14 overs)

Match drawn
Sophia Gardens, Cardiff
Umpires: Graham Lloyd and Sue Redfern

- Glamorgan won the toss and elected to field.
- Points: Derbyshire 9, Glamorgan 8.

=== Standings ===
Pos	Team	Pld	W	L	T	D	Bat	Bowl	Ded	Pts	
1	Durham (P)	14	7	1	0	6	54	39	2	233	Promotion to Division 1
2	Worcestershire (P)	14	5	3	0	6	21	36	0	167	Promotion to Division 1
3	Sussex	14	3	1	0	10	29	39	16	150	
4	Leicestershire	14	3	4	0	7	25	35	0	143	
5	Glamorgan	14	1	1	0	12	29	34	0	139	
6	Derbyshire	14	0	4	0	10	25	38	0	113	
7	Yorkshire	14	3	2	0	8	31	35	50	109	
8	Gloucestershire	14	0	6	0	7	23	35	0	98	

Source: ESPNCricinfo, ECB, BBC
- Yorkshire deducted 48 points by the ECB for the handling of the Azeem Rafiq scandal, and a further two points for slow over rates.
- Sussex deducted 12 points by the ECB for receiving four fixed penalties during the season.
  (P) Promoted

== One-Day Cup ==
=== Matches ===
==== Worcestershire v Glamorgan (4 August) ====
4 August
Scorecard

Glamorgan; 199 (40.2 overs)	v	Worcestershire; 200/6 (41.3 overs)
Ben Kellaway 82 (74); Brett D'Oliveira 3/37 (8.2 overs)		Azhar Ali 78 (104); Kiran Carlson 4/48 (10 overs)

Worcestershire won by 4 wickets
New Road, Worcester
Umpires: Jack Shantry and Simon Widdup

- Worcestershire won the toss and elected to field.
- Alex Horton, Ben Kellaway and Ben Morris (all Glam) made their List A debuts.
- Points: Worcestershire 2, Glamorgan 0.

==== Derbyshire v Glamorgan (6 August) ====
6 August
Scorecard

Derbyshire; 298/8 (50 overs)	v	Glamorgan; 299/3 (47.1 overs)
Harry Came 73 (86); Ben Kellaway 3/41 (8 overs)		Colin Ingram 115* (108); Anuj Dal 1/30 (6 overs)

Glamorgan won by 7 wickets
County Ground, Derby
Umpires: James Tredwell and Mansoor Qureshi

- Glamorgan won the toss and elected to field.
- Points: Glamorgan 2, Derbyshire 0.

==== Glamorgan v Durham (8 August) ====
8 August
Scorecard

Glamorgan	v	Durham

Match abandoned without a ball bowled
The Gnoll, Neath
Umpires: Anthony Harris and David Millns

- No toss.
- Points: Glamorgan 1, Durham 1.

==== Glamorgan v Warwickshire (10 August) ====
10 August
Scorecard

Warwickshire; 331/7 (50 overs)	v	Glamorgan; 307 (47.1 overs)
Rob Yates 102 (114); Ben Kellaway 3/56 (7 overs)		Sam Northeast 69 (89); Oliver Hannon-Dalby 4/43 (10 overs)

Warwickshire won by 24 runs
The Gnoll, Neath
Umpires: Hassan Adnan and Paul Baldwin

- Glamorgan won the toss and elected to field.
- Michael Booth (Warks) made his List A debut.
- Points: Warwickshire 2, Glamorgan 0.

==== Sussex v Glamorgan (13 August) ====
13 August
Scorecard

Sussex; 276/9 (50 overs)	v	Glamorgan; 278/6 (46.3 overs)
Fynn Hudson-Prentice 66 (54); Zain-ul-Hassan 4/25 (5 overs)		Colin Ingram 73 (75); Fynn Hudson-Prentice 2/45 (8.3 overs)

Glamorgan won by 4 wickets
County Ground, Hove
Umpires: Anna Harris and Nigel Llong

- Sussex won the toss and elected to bat.
- Points: Glamorgan 2, Sussex 0.

==== Glamorgan v Gloucestershire (16 August) ====
16 August
Scorecard

Glamorgan; 217 (46 overs)	v	Gloucestershire; 218/5 (46.1 overs)
Eddie Byrom 60 (92); Graeme van Buuren 3/41 (9 overs)		Ollie Price 109* (113); Ben Kellaway 3/47 (10 overs)

Gloucestershire won by 5 wickets
Sophia Gardens, Cardiff
Umpires: Mike Burns and Rob White

- Glamorgan won the toss and elected to bat.
- Points: Gloucestershire 2, Glamorgan 0.

==== Somerset v Glamorgan (20 August) ====
20 August
Scorecard

Somerset; 298/7 (50 overs)	v	Glamorgan; 301/8 (47.1 overs)
Andrew Umeed 116 (136); Ben Kellaway 3/49 (10 overs)		Eddie Byrom 108 (103); Andrew Umeed 3/31 (8 overs)

Glamorgan won by 2 wickets
County Ground, Taunton
Umpires: Ben Peverall and Ian Blackwell

- Somerset won the toss and elected to bat.
- Points: Glamorgan 2, Somerset 0.

==== Glamorgan v Northamptonshire (22 August) ====
22 August
Scorecard

Northamptonshire; 340/5 (50 overs)	v	Glamorgan; 343/5 (47.4 overs)
Ricardo Vasconcelos 106 (114); Andy Gorvin 2/56 (9 overs)		Sam Northeast 100 (105); Tom Taylor 2/75 (9 overs)

Glamorgan won by 5 wickets
Sophia Gardens, Cardiff
Umpires: Graham Lloyd and Naeem Ashraf

- Northamptonshire won the toss and elected to bat.
- Points: Glamorgan 2, Northamptonshire 0.

=== Standings ===
Pos	Team	Pld	W	L	T	NR	Ded	Pts	NRR
1	Warwickshire	8	7	1	0	0	0	14	1.301
2	Gloucestershire	8	6	2	0	0	0	12	0.830
3	Worcestershire	8	6	2	0	0	0	12	0.533
4	Glamorgan	8	4	3	0	1	0	9	−0.065
5	Durham	8	3	4	0	1	0	7	−0.841
6	Northamptonshire	8	3	5	0	0	0	6	0.391
7	Somerset	8	3	5	0	0	0	6	−0.285
8	Derbyshire	8	2	6	0	0	0	4	−0.470
9	Sussex	8	1	7	0	0	0	2	−1.453

Source: BBC Sport, ECB, Cricinfo.
- Advanced directly to the semi-finals
- Advanced to the quarter-finals

== T20 Blast ==
=== Matches ===
==== Gloucestershire v Glamorgan (26 May) ====
26 May (D/N)
Scorecard

Gloucestershire; 161/9 (20 overs)	v	Glamorgan; 162/8 (19.1 overs)
Ben Charlesworth 56 (39); Dan Douthwaite 4/23 (4 overs)		Colin Ingram 47 (33); David Payne 3/17 (4 overs)

Glamorgan won by 2 wickets
County Ground, Bristol
Umpires: Paul Baldwin and Paul Pollard

- Glamorgan won the toss and elected to field.
- Ben Charlesworth (Glos) and Ben Kellaway (Glam) made their T20 debuts.
- Points: Glamorgan 2, Gloucestershire 0.

==== Somerset v Glamorgan (28 May) ====
28 May
Scorecard

Glamorgan; 153 (19.4 overs)	v	Somerset; 154/6 (14.5 overs)
Eddie Byrom 42 (28); Roelof van der Merwe 3/24 (4 overs)		Tom Banton 54 (28); Dan Douthwaite 3/26 (3 overs)

Somerset won by 4 wickets
County Ground, Taunton
Umpires: Billy Taylor and Mark Newell

- Somerset won the toss and elected to field.
- Points: Somerset 2, Glamorgan 0.

==== Middlesex v Glamorgan (31 May) ====
31 May (D/N)
Scorecard

Glamorgan; 238/3 (20 overs)	v	Middlesex; 209/5 (20 overs)
Chris Cooke 113* (41); Blake Cullen 2/23 (4 overs)		Joe Cracknell 77 (42); Peter Hatzoglou 2/28 (4 overs)

Glamorgan won by 29 runs
Merchant Taylors' School Ground, Northwood
Umpires: Ben Debenham and Billy Taylor

- Glamorgan won the toss and elected to bat.
- Points: Glamorgan 2, Middlesex 0.

==== Glamorgan v Kent (2 June) ====
2 June (D/N)
Scorecard

Kent; 189/6 (20 overs)	v	Glamorgan; 191/3 (17 overs)
Tawanda Muyeye 62 (38); Peter Hatzoglou 2/25 (4 overs)		Colin Ingram 63* (32); Grant Stewart 2/51 (3 overs)

Glamorgan won by 7 wickets
Sophia Gardens, Cardiff
Umpires: Jack Shantry and Rob White

- Glamorgan won the toss and elected to field.
- Zain-ul-Hassan (Glam) made his T20 debut.
- Points: Glamorgan 2, Kent 0.

==== Sussex v Glamorgan (4 June) ====
4 June
Scorecard

Glamorgan; 219/5 (20 overs)	v	Sussex; 187/8 (20 overs)
Chris Cooke 50 (28); Henry Crocombe 3/38 (4 overs)		Tom Alsop 58 (42); Jamie McIlroy 3/28 (4 overs)

Glamorgan won by 32 runs
County Ground, Hove
Umpires: Ben Debenham and Mark Newell

- Sussex won the toss and elected to field.
- Eddie Byrom (Glam) retired hurt after 1.4 overs.
- Points: Glamorgan 2, Sussex 0.

==== Glamorgan v Surrey (7 June) ====
7 June (D/N)
Scorecard

Surrey; 236/2 (20 overs)	v	Glamorgan; 171/8 (20 overs)
Laurie Evans 118* (60); Jamie McIlroy 1/33 (4 overs)		Sam Northeast 76 (54); Gus Atkinson 2/24 (4 overs)

Surrey won by 65 runs
Sophia Gardens, Cardiff
Umpires: Ian Blackwell and Paul Baldwin

- Surrey won the toss and elected to bat.
- Points: Surrey 2, Glamorgan 0.

==== Glamorgan v Essex (9 June) ====
9 June (D/N)
Scorecard

Glamorgan; 226/9 (20 overs)	v	Essex; 175 (18.3 overs)
Paul Walter 78 (34); Ruaidhri Smith 3/33 (4 overs)		Colin Ingram 48 (21); Paul Walter 2/19 (2 overs)

Essex won by 51 runs
Sophia Gardens, Cardiff
Umpires: Graham Lloyd and Tom Lungley

- Essex won the toss and elected to bat.
- Points: Essex 2, Glamorgan 0.

==== Essex v Glamorgan (16 June) ====
16 June (D/N)
Scorecard

Glamorgan; 175/6 (20 overs)	v	Essex; 177/6 (16 overs)
Kiran Carlson 43 (25); Simon Harmer 2/43 (4 overs)		Feroze Khushi 61 (37); Jamie McIlroy 4/36 (3 overs)

Essex won by 4 wickets
County Ground, Chelmsford
Umpires: Ben Debenham and Chris Watts

- Essex won the toss and elected to field.
- Points: Essex 2, Glamorgan 0.

==== Glamorgan v Gloucestershire (18 June) ====
18 June
Scorecard

Glamorgan; 183/5 (20 overs)	v	Gloucestershire; 151/8 (20 overs)
Sam Northeast 60* (48); Tom Smith 2/20 (4 overs)		Ben Charlesworth 45 (28); Peter Hatzoglou 3/23 (4 overs)

Glamorgan won by 32 runs
Sophia Gardens, Cardiff
Umpires: Ian Blackwell and Richard Illingworth

- Gloucestershire won the toss and elected to field.
- Zaman Akhter (Glos) made his T20 debut.
- Points: Glamorgan 2, Gloucestershire 0.

==== Surrey v Glamorgan (20 June) ====
20 June (D/N)
Scorecard

Surrey; 238/5 (20 overs)	v	Glamorgan; 157/8 (20 overs)
Will Jacks 69 (40); Peter Hatzoglou 3/45 (4 overs)		Chris Cooke 49 (28); Chris Jordan 4/21 (4 overs)

Surrey won by 81 runs
The Oval, London
Umpires: Nigel Llong and Paul Pollard

- Glamorgan won the toss and elected to field.
- Josh Blake (Surrey) and Andy Gorvin (Glam) made their T20 debuts.
- Points: Surrey 2, Glamorgan 0.

==== Glamorgan v Somerset (21 June) ====
21 June (D/N)
Scorecard

Glamorgan; 171 (19.3 overs)	v	Somerset; 172/2 (17.1 overs)
Kiran Carlson 71 (45); Craig Overton 3/21 (4 overs)		Will Smeed 66 (36); Ruaidhri Smith 2/47 (4 overs)

Somerset won by 8 wickets
Sophia Gardens, Cardiff
Umpires: Jack Shantry and Russell Warren

- Somerset won the toss and elected to field.
- Points: Somerset 2, Glamorgan 0.

==== Glamorgan v Sussex (23 June) ====
23 June (D/N)
Scorecard

Sussex; 182/6 (20 overs)	v	Glamorgan; 162/8 (20 overs)
Shadab Khan 87* (53); Timm van der Gugten 3/20 (3 overs)		Cam Fletcher 57 (40); Bradley Currie 2/21 (3 overs)

Sussex won by 20 runs
Sophia Gardens, Cardiff
Umpires: James Middlebrook and Mike Burns

- Sussex won the toss and elected to bat.
- Points: Sussex 2, Glamorgan 0.

==== Hampshire v Glamorgan (30 June) ====
30 June (D/N)
Scorecard

Hampshire; 97/2 (9.2 overs)	v	Glamorgan; 54/1 (5.3 overs)
Ben McDermott 54* (27); Peter Hatzoglou 1/6 (1.2 overs)		Colin Ingram 34 (14); Nathan Ellis 1/17 (2 overs)

Hampshire won by 21 runs (DLS method)
Rose Bowl, Southampton
Umpires: Mark Newell and Mike Burns

- Glamorgan won the toss and elected to field.
- Rain reduced the Hampshire innings to 9.2 overs and the Glamorgan innings to 5.3 overs.
- Points: Hampshire 2, Glamorgan 0.

==== Glamorgan v Middlesex (2 July) ====
2 July
Scorecard

Middlesex; 200/9 (20 overs)	v	Glamorgan; 151 (15.3 overs)
Ryan Higgins 71* (36); Prem Sisodiya 3/32 (4 overs)		Kiran Carlson 77 (30); Ryan Higgins 3/20 (3 overs)

Middlesex won by 49 runs
Sophia Gardens, Cardiff
Umpires: Mike Burns and Naeem Ashraf

- Middlesex won the toss and elected to bat.
- Points: Middlesex 2, Glamorgan 0.

=== Standings ===
Pos	Team	Pld	W	L	T	NR	Pts	NRR
1	Somerset	14	12	2	0	0	24	1.460
2	Hampshire Hawks	14	9	5	0	0	18	0.820
3	Surrey	14	8	6	0	0	16	1.192
4	Essex Eagles	14	8	6	0	0	16	0.088
5	Kent Spitfires	14	7	7	0	0	14	0.287
6	Sussex Sharks	14	6	8	0	0	12	−0.871
7	Gloucestershire	14	5	9	0	0	10	−0.993
8	Glamorgan	14	5	9	0	0	10	−1.060
9	Middlesex	14	3	11	0	0	6	−0.932

Source: ESPNcricinfo

Advanced to the Quarter-finals

== Statistics ==
=== Batting ===
First-class
Player	Matches	Innings	NO	Runs	HS	Ave	SR	100	50	0	4s	6s
Kiran Carlson	14	23	0	1,068	192	46.43	69.12	4	5	2	127	11
Billy Root	14	23	6	884	117*	52.00	60.46	1	6	1	132	5
Chris Cooke	14	21	5	733	134*	45.81	59.40	2	2	1	93	3
Sam Northeast	13	20	1	646	166*	34.00	52.43	2	2	2	72	3
Marnus Labuschagne	5	8	1	502	170*	71.71	58.16	2	2	0	65	6
Michael Neser	6	7	1	487	176*	81.16	65.89	2	2	0	65	4
Eddie Byrom	8	15	2	475	101	36.53	49.73	1	4	3	68	5
Zain-ul-Hassan	9	16	1	453	69	30.20	41.25	0	2	1	69	1
Colin Ingram	7	12	0	357	136	29.75	57.95	1	1	0	55	2
David Lloyd	8	13	2	332	81	30.18	70.04	0	1	2	48	2

List A
Player	Matches	Innings	NO	Runs	HS	Ave	SR	100	50	0	4s	6s
Eddie Byrom	7	7	0	352	108	50.28	88.00	1	3	0	50	0
Kiran Carlson	7	7	0	332	75	47.42	121.61	0	4	0	35	7
Colin Ingram	6	6	1	278	115*	55.60	103.34	1	2	0	28	7
Sam Northeast	5	5	1	245	100	61.25	82.21	1	1	0	24	3
Billy Root	5	5	3	208	74*	104.00	104.00	0	2	0	17	1
Ben Kellaway	7	6	0	195	82	32.50	127.45	0	2	1	21	6
Alex Horton	7	6	1	81	44*	16.20	97.59	0	0	0	12	1
Tom Bevan	4	4	0	60	44	15.00	74.07	0	0	1	8	2
Zain-ul-Hassan	4	4	1	38	26*	12.66	69.09	0	0	0	3	1
Jamie McIlroy	5	2	1	17	13	17.00	44.73	0	0	0	1	0

Twenty20
Player	Matches	Innings	NO	Runs	HS	Ave	SR	100	50	0	4s	6s
Chris Cooke	14	14	3	419	113*	38.09	171.02	1	1	1	35	22
Kiran Carlson	14	14	1	392	77	30.15	164.70	0	2	1	40	21
Colin Ingram	10	10	2	376	92*	47.00	167.85	0	2	0	42	14
Sam Northeast	14	13	1	315	76	26.25	119.31	0	2	1	30	10
Timm van der Gugten	8	8	2	148	48	24.66	166.29	0	0	1	6	12
Billy Root	10	8	1	135	36	19.28	127.35	0	0	1	12	5
Eddie Byrom	5	5	1	120	43	30.00	169.01	0	0	0	15	6
Will Smale	5	4	0	65	27	16.25	138.29	0	0	0	11	1
Cam Fletcher	3	3	0	58	57	19.33	128.88	0	1	1	1	4
Peter Hatzoglou	13	6	5	45	15	45.00	145.16	0	0	0	3	1

=== Bowling ===
First-class
Player	Matches	Innings	Overs	Maidens	Runs	Wickets	BBI	BBM	Ave	Econ	SR	5w	10w
Timm van der Gugten	13	20	385.5	89	1,140	39	6/88	7/76	29.23	2.95	59.35	3	0
James Harris	11	17	292.4	37	1,189	32	4/18	6/113	37.15	4.06	54.87	0	0
Jamie McIlroy	10	17	259.5	51	736	24	5/34	8/75	30.66	2.83	64.95	1	0
Michael Neser	6	9	155.3	26	523	20	7/32	7/123	26.15	3.36	46.65	1	0
Mitchell Swepson	4	6	176.3	32	585	14	4/89	7/141	41.78	3.31	75.64	0	0
Kiran Carlson	14	13	206.0	12	853	14	3/147	4/166	60.92	4.14	88.28	0	0
Zain-ul-Hassan	9	11	143.0	22	477	8	2/18	4/65	59.62	3.33	107.25	0	0
Andy Gorvin	5	7	96.4	25	318	7	3/88	3/88	45.42	3.28	82.85	0	0
Marnus Labuschagne	5	7	39.3	1	217	5	4/81	4/81	43.40	5.49	47.40	0	0
David Lloyd	8	8	59.0	5	266	5	2/32	4/115	53.20	4.50	70.80	0	0

List A
Player	Matches	Innings	Overs	Maidens	Runs	Wickets	BBI	Ave	Econ	SR	4w	5w
Ben Kellaway	7	7	55.0	1	298	13	3/41	22.92	5.41	25.38	0	0
Kiran Carlson	7	7	56.0	0	339	8	4/48	42.37	6.05	42.00	1	0
Zain-ul-Hassan	4	3	21.0	0	139	7	4/25	19.85	6.61	18.00	1	0
Andy Gorvin	5	5	46.3	0	274	7	2/56	39.14	5.89	39.85	0	0
Prem Sisodiya	3	3	28.0	1	156	2	1/44	78.00	5.57	84.00	0	0
Timm van der Gugten	4	4	36.0	6	176	2	2/41	88.00	4.88	108.00	0	0
Jamie McIlroy	5	5	41.0	3	200	2	1/13	100.00	4.87	123.00	0	0
Harry Podmore	3	3	23.0	0	120	1	1/19	120.00	5.21	138.00	0	0
Ruaidhri Smith	2	2	17.0	0	133	1	1/75	133.00	7.82	102.00	0	0

Twenty20
Player	Matches	Innings	Overs	Maidens	Runs	Wickets	BBI	Ave	Econ	SR	4w	5w
Jamie McIlroy	13	13	46.5	0	428	19	4/36	22.52	9.13	14.78	1	0
Peter Hatzoglou	13	13	46.2	1	404	17	3/23	23.76	8.71	16.35	0	0
Ruaidhri Smith	12	12	42.0	1	416	12	3/33	34.66	9.90	21.00	0	0
Dan Douthwaite	6	6	20.4	0	205	10	4/23	20.50	9.91	12.40	1	0
Timm van der Gugten	8	8	29.0	1	311	9	3/20	34.55	10.72	19.33	0	0
Prem Sisodiya	8	8	28.0	0	279	8	3/32	34.87	9.96	21.00	0	0
Andy Gorvin	5	5	16.1	0	150	3	1/30	50.00	9.27	32.33	0	0
Kiran Carlson	14	4	5.2	0	60	2	2/13	30.00	11.25	16.00	0	0
