= Glamorgan County Cricket Club in 2022 =

Glamorgan County Cricket Club
2022 season
- Coach: (Wales) Matthew Maynard
- Captain: (Wales) David Lloyd
- Overseas player: (Australia) Marnus Labuschagne (Australia) Michael Neser (New Zealand) Ajaz Patel (South Africa) Colin Ingram (T20)
- Ground(s): Sophia Gardens, Cardiff; The Gnoll, Neath
- County Championship: 3rd, Division Two
- One-Day Cup: 4th, Group B
- T20 Blast: 6th, South Group
- Most runs: FC: Sam Northeast (1,189); LA: Colin Ingram (342); T20: Sam Northeast (510)
- Most wickets: FC: Michael Hogan (45); LA: Kiran Carlson (9); T20: Michael Hogan (20)
- Most catches: FC: Sam Northeast (13); LA: Joe Cooke (5); T20: Michael Neser (7)
- Most wicket-keeping dismissals: FC: Chris Cooke (51 ct + 5 st); LA: Tom Cullen (3 ct + 2 st); T20: Chris Cooke (4 ct + 1 st)

The 2022 season was Glamorgan County Cricket Club's 135th year in existence and their 102nd as a first-class cricket county. They finished third in the Second Division of the County Championship, nine points behind second-placed Middlesex; they also finished fourth in Group B of the One-Day Cup, a point off the quarter-final qualification places, and sixth in the South Group of the 2022 T20 Blast, six points off the quarter-final places. It was the team's third season with Matthew Maynard as head coach and their first with David Lloyd as captain. The team's overseas players were Australians Marnus Labuschagne and Michael Neser, and South African Colin Ingram, while Shubman Gill and Ajaz Patel were brought in during the season. Glamorgan played two 50-over matches at The Gnoll in Neath, their first matches there for 27 years, but for the third season in a row, they did not play any matches at Penrhyn Avenue in Rhos-on-Sea.

== Friendlies ==
=== MCC University Match: Glamorgan v Cardiff MCCU (2–4 April) ===
2–4 April
Scorecard

Glamorgan	v	Cardiff MCCU
320/7d (94 overs); Kiran Carlson 148 (194); Tim Wyatt 3/48 (18 overs)		249/6d (72 overs); Morgan Bevans 108* (151); Joe Cooke 4/28 (16 overs)
163/4d (39 overs); Billy Root 64* (85); Tegid Phillips 1/30 (10 overs)		33/1 (13 overs); Will Smale 18* (39); Callum Taylor 1/13 (4 overs)

Match drawn
Sophia Gardens, Cardiff
Umpires: Anthony Harris and Ian Blackwell

- Glamorgan won the toss and elected to bat.
- 12 players per side (11 batting, 11 fielding)

Glamorgan began their preparations for the 2022 season with a three-day match against Cardiff MCC University. With newly appointed club captain David Lloyd rested for the match, Kiran Carlson took the captaincy and led the first innings with a score of 148. Opening batsman Joe Cooke also scored a half-century, and Tom Cullen made an unbeaten 38 as Glamorgan made it to 320/7 before declaring ahead of the second day's play. Cooke then took four wickets as Cardiff MCCU managed a total of 249/6 declared, although 108 of those runs came courtesy of Glamorgan academy batsman Morgan Bevans, who finished the innings unbeaten. Glamorgan finished the second day with 26 runs for no loss. Wet conditions meant 90 minutes of play were lost on the morning of the third day. Glamorgan batted on for 29 more overs, Billy Root putting on an unbeaten 64 on the way to a total of 163/4 before they declared. Cardiff MCCU were set a nominal target of 235, but with only 13 overs possible before the close of play due to bad light, they finished on 33/1 and the match was drawn.

=== NCCA Showcase Match: Glamorgan v Wales NC (31 July) ===
31 July
Scorecard

Glamorgan; 331/7 (40 overs)	v	Wales National County; 198 (31.5 overs)
Colin Ingram 110 (77); Ben Morris 2/53		Tom Bevan 80 (61); Jamie McIlroy 3/39 (8 overs)

Glamorgan won by 133 runs
Sophia Gardens, Cardiff
Umpires: Paul Baldwin and Ben Peverall

- Wales National County won the toss and elected to field.

Ahead of their defence of the One-Day Cup title, Glamorgan played a 40-over friendly against Wales National County at Sophia Gardens. The National County won the toss and chose to field, but a century from Colin Ingram and fifties from David Lloyd and Billy Root helped Glamorgan to a total of 331/7 in their allotted overs. Glamorgan Second XI batter Tom Bevan provided an anchor for the Wales NC response, hitting 80 off just 61 balls; however, Glamorgan's Joe Cooke struck with his first two balls after being brought on to bowl, and Jamie McIlroy also took two in two to remove Bevan and Andy Gorvin. Ben Kellaway and Sam Jardine provided some resistance for the National County, each scoring 39, but two wickets in an over for spinner Andrew Salter meant Wales NC were bowled out for 198, giving Glamorgan a 133-run win.

== County Championship ==
=== Matches ===
==== Glamorgan v Durham (7–10 April) ====
7–10 April
Scorecard

Glamorgan	v	Durham
234 (72.5 overs); Colin Ingram 87 (152); Ben Raine 3/35 (18 overs)		383 (115 overs); Alex Lees 182* (358); Andrew Salter 7/45 (12 overs)
220/5 (68 overs); Chris Cooke 85* (144); Chris Rushworth 2/38 (17 overs)

Match drawn
Sophia Gardens, Cardiff
Umpires: Ian Blackwell and Russell Warren

- Durham won the toss and elected to field.
- Points: Glamorgan 11, Durham 15

Extreme weather at Sophia Gardens meant only 47 overs were possible after Glamorgan were put in to bat by Durham on the first day of the County Championship season. Stand-in opener Andrew Salter and vice-captain Kiran Carlson scored only a run each, while captain David Lloyd and new signing Sam Northeast could only manage starts, falling for less than 30 each as Glamorgan found themselves at 108/4 in the 29th over; however, Colin Ingram's unbeaten 71, aided by Chris Cooke, meant they recovered to 164/4 before rain forced the close of play.

Ingram and Cooke eventually fell for 87 and 59, respectively, and Glamorgan were all out for 234 before lunch on the second day; however, Durham faced just one over before rain and hail set in and brought play to a close for the day. Glamorgan found wickets hard to come by on day 3, as England opener Alex Lees reached 163 not out by the close of play; supported by Scott Borthwick (64) and David Bedingham (unbeaten on 71), Durham reached 348/3, a lead of 114.

It took just 10 overs for Glamorgan to bowl Durham out on the final morning, as they lost seven wickets for just 35 runs, six of them falling to the off spin of Salter, who finished with career-best figures of 7/45 off 12 overs. Glamorgan needed 149 runs to make Durham bat again, but were four wickets down after 23 overs; however, Carlson (61) and Cooke (85 not out) were able to stabilise the innings, helping Glamorgan to 220/5 by the close of play, and the match was drawn.

==== Nottinghamshire v Glamorgan (14–17 April) ====
14–17 April
Scorecard

Nottinghamshire	v	Glamorgan
302 (88.1 overs); Ben Duckett 122 (207); Michael Neser 3/56 (17.1 overs)		379 (107.5 overs); Sam Northeast 85 (162); Joey Evison 3/67 (16 overs)
242 (96.5 overs); Ben Duckett 95 (178); Timm van der Gugten 4/60 (25 overs)		166/3 (45 overs); Marnus Labuschagne 50* (93); Dane Paterson 1/29 (13 overs)

Glamorgan won by 7 wickets
Trent Bridge, Nottingham
Umpires: Chris Watts and Richard Illingworth

- Glamorgan won the toss and elected to field.
- Points: Glamorgan 23, Nottinghamshire 6

==== Glamorgan v Middlesex (21–23 April) ====
21–23 April
Scorecard

Glamorgan	v	Middlesex
122 (41.1 overs); Chris Cooke 31 (68); Toby Roland-Jones 3/34 (13 overs)		336 (104.2 overs); John Simpson 104* (246); James Harris 4/68 (20 overs)
132 (46.5 overs); Michael Neser 27 (32); Toby Roland-Jones 5/40 (17 overs)

Middlesex won by an innings and 82 runs
Sophia Gardens, Cardiff
Umpires: Mike Burns and Rob White

- Middlesex won the toss and elected to field.
- Points: Middlesex 22, Glamorgan 3

==== Derbyshire v Glamorgan (28 April – 1 May) ====
28 April – 1 May
Scorecard

Derbyshire	v	Glamorgan
368 (126.2 overs); Brooke Guest 109 (251); Michael Hogan 4/55 (26 overs)		387 (101.4 overs); Marnus Labuschagne 130 (199); Suranga Lakmal 5/82 (29.4 overs)
349/3d (89.1 overs); Brooke Guest 138 (242); Timm van der Gugten 1/17 (6.1 overs)		310/8 (54.5 overs); Marnus Labuschagne 85 (87); Ryan Sidebottom 4/50 (14 overs)

Match drawn
County Ground, Derby
Umpires: Neil Pratt and Paul Pollard

- Derbyshire won the toss and elected to bat.
- Points: Derbyshire 14, Glamorgan 14.

==== Glamorgan v Leicestershire (5–8 May) ====
5–8 May
Scorecard

Leicestershire	v	Glamorgan
320 (107.5 overs); Rishi Patel 82 (164); Marnus Labuschagne 3/65 (17 overs)		437 (118.4 overs); Kiran Carlson 91 (135); Chris Wright 3/83 (27 overs)
266 (86.2 overs); Ben Mike 64 (100); Michael Hogan 3/33 (13.2 overs)		153/4 (40.4 overs); Sam Northeast 40* (87); Callum Parkinson 3/38 (17 overs)

Glamorgan won by 6 wickets
Sophia Gardens, Cardiff
Umpires: Alex Wharf and Rob White

- Glamorgan won the toss and elected to field.
- Andy Gorvin (Glam) made his first-class debut.
- Points: Glamorgan 23, Leicestershire 5.

==== Durham v Glamorgan (12–15 May) ====
12–15 May
Scorecard

Durham	v	Glamorgan
311 (84.3 overs); Ben Stokes 82 (110); Michael Hogan 4/67 (16.3 overs)		365 (89 overs); Billy Root 88 (148); Matty Potts 4/61 (20 overs); Ben Raine 4/61 (20 overs)
249 (86.2 overs); Scott Borthwick 90 (124); Michael Neser 4/57 (21.2 overs)		137 (53.5 overs); Marnus Labuschagne 31 (46); Matty Potts 7/40 (18.5 overs)

Durham won by 58 runs
Riverside Ground, Chester-le-Street
Umpires: Alex Wharf and James Middlebrook

- Glamorgan won the toss and elected to field.
- Points: Durham 22, Glamorgan 7.

==== Glamorgan v Sussex (12–15 June) ====
12–15 June
Scorecard

Sussex	v	Glamorgan
376 (119.4 overs); Oli Carter 185 (289); Andrew Salter 4/107 (41.4 overs)		494 (131.3 overs); Colin Ingram 178 (272); Henry Crocombe 4/84 (22 overs)
258 (86.5 overs); Oli Carter 83 (172); Michael Neser 3/58 (21.5 overs)		141/5 (39.1 overs); Sam Northeast 45* (86); Jack Brooks 2/22 (11 overs)

Glamorgan won by 5 wickets
Sophia Gardens, Cardiff
Umpires: Billy Taylor and Rob White

- Glamorgan won the toss and elected to field.
- Points: Glamorgan 23, Sussex 5.

==== Worcestershire v Glamorgan (26–29 June) ====
26–29 June
Scorecard

Worcestershire	v	Glamorgan
271 (84.4 overs); Ed Barnard 131 (182); Michael Neser 3/40 (17.4 overs)		139 (44.3 overs); Eddie Byrom 57 (131); Joe Leach 6/44 (13 overs)
199 (71.4 overs); Jake Libby 49 (140); Michael Neser 4/50 (19 overs)		334/7 (111.1 overs); Colin Ingram 102 (203); Charlie Morris 2/39 (17 overs)

Glamorgan won by 3 wickets
New Road, Worcester
Umpires: Steve O'Shaughnessy and Tom Lungley

- Glamorgan won the toss and elected to field.
- Tom Fell replaced Taylor Cornall for Worcestershire after the first day due to a concussion.
- Points: Glamorgan 19, Worcestershire 5.

==== Glamorgan v Nottinghamshire (11–14 July) ====
11–14 July
Scorecard

Glamorgan	v	Nottinghamshire
318 (84.2 overs); Sam Northeast 56 (84); Brett Hutton 4/76 (17 overs)		285 (86 overs); Matt Montgomery 80 (166); Michael Hogan 4/47 (20 overs)
421/5d (101.3 overs); Eddie Byrom 144 (204); Liam Patterson-White 2/116 (26 overs)		259/4 (95.4 overs); Joe Clarke 95 (155); Kiran Carlson 1/17 (4.4 overs)

Match drawn
Sophia Gardens, Cardiff
Umpires: Hassan Adnan and Mark Newell

- Nottinghamshire won the toss and elected to field.
- Points: Glamorgan 14, Nottinghamshire 13.

==== Leicestershire v Glamorgan (20–23 July) ====
20–23 July
Scorecard

Leicestershire	v	Glamorgan
584 (148 overs); Wiaan Mulder 156 (201); Andrew Salter 4/158 (42 overs)		795/5d (160 overs); Sam Northeast 410* (450); Chris Wright 3/99 (27 overs)
183 (59.4 overs); Wiaan Mulder 59 (92); Michael Hogan 4/43 (14 overs)

Glamorgan won by an innings and 28 runs
Grace Road, Leicester
Umpires: Nigel Llong and Paul Baldwin

- Leicestershire won the toss and elected to bat.
- Roman Walker (Leics) made his first-class debut.
- Sam Northeast (Glam) recorded his maiden double-, triple- and quadruple-centuries in this match, making him one of 11 batters to score at least 400 runs in a first-class innings.
- Points: Glamorgan 23, Leicestershire 6.

The two teams went into the match at opposite ends of the table, with Leicestershire still without a win, while Glamorgan were unbeaten in their last three and just a point behind second-placed Middlesex in the chase for promotion. Nevertheless, the home side were in good batting form, having scored 756/4 declared in their previous match away to Sussex, including double-hundreds for both Colin Ackermann and Wiaan Mulder. After winning the toss and choosing to bat, Leicestershire scored quickly on the opening day, reaching 387/5 by the close of play; although they lost Ackermann for a golden duck, Mulder picked up where he had left off in Hove, finishing the day unbeaten on 147, supported by half-centuries from Louis Kimber (68), Lewis Hill (81) and Harry Swindells (52*).

Swindells was dismissed with the third ball of the second day, followed by Mulder less than nine overs later, but Ben Mike (91) and former Glamorgan player Roman Walker (64) helped Leicestershire to a total of 584. Glamorgan lost both of their opening batters in little more than the first six overs of their response, but Colin Ingram (46*) – in his last match before leaving for the 2022 Caribbean Premier League – and Sam Northeast (50*) helped the Welsh county reach 111/2 at the end of day 2. Ingram and Northeast batted comfortably through the morning session on day 3, both reaching their centuries on the way to a partnership of 306 before Ingram was dismissed for 139. Kiran Carlson and Billy Root followed in quick succession soon afterwards, but Northeast and Chris Cooke stabilised the innings with another 229 runs before the end of the day, as Northeast reached his maiden double- and triple-centuries in first-class cricket, leaving Glamorgan just 21 runs behind the hosts.

Northeast soon passed Steve James' previous record of 309*, set at Colwyn Bay in 2000, for the highest score by a Glamorgan player in the County Championship. That match had also seen Glamorgan's highest total in the Championship (718/3d), but that record also fell as Cooke reached his century and Northeast reached 400, the fourth man to do so in the Championship and the eleventh in all first-class cricket. Glamorgan declared at the end of the morning session with the score at 795/5, having added 232 runs to their overnight total; Northeast finished on 410*, the third-highest score in the Championship and ninth in all first-class cricket, while Cooke was unbeaten on 191, their partnership worth 461 runs – the biggest sixth-wicket stand in Championship history and the biggest for any wicket by a Glamorgan pair. With a lead of 211, the visitors gave themselves two sessions to bowl Leicestershire out, but by the end of the first, they had just three wickets to show for their efforts; however, two wickets in an over from Michael Hogan with Leicestershire on 128 sparked a batting collapse. As in the first innings, Mulder was the home side's main source of resistance, but he managed just 59 before he was caught behind for Hogan's fourth wicket of the innings, leaving Leicestershire on 181/9 with 9.3 overs left in the match. Michael Neser, in his final Championship match before returning to Australia for pre-season with Queensland, bowled Chris Wright soon after to give Glamorgan the victory by an innings and 28 runs. The win moved Glamorgan up to second place in the Division 2 table, eight points ahead of Middlesex.

==== Glamorgan v Worcestershire (5–8 September) ====
5–8 September
Scorecard

Worcestershire	v	Glamorgan
454/9d (138 overs); Gareth Roderick 172* (348); Timm van der Gugten 4/81 (30 overs)		295 (85.3 overs); Shubman Gill 92 (148); Dillon Pennington 4/78 (22.3 overs)
		5/0 (1.3 overs) (f/o); David Lloyd 4* (7)

Match drawn
Sophia Gardens, Cardiff
Umpires: Billy Taylor and Paul Baldwin

- Worcestershire won the toss and elected to bat.
- Points: Worcestershire 14, Glamorgan 12.

==== Middlesex v Glamorgan (12–15 September) ====
12–15 September
Scorecard

Glamorgan	v	Middlesex
214 (54.1 overs); Chris Cooke 52 (83); Ryan Higgins 4/59 (15.1 overs)		390 (112.1 overs); Mark Stoneman 128 (203); James Harris 5/90 (29.1 overs)
220 (74.5 overs); David Lloyd 70 (92); Toby Roland-Jones 5/61 (21.5 overs)		45/0 (5.2 overs); Sam Robson 25* (15)

Middlesex won by 10 wickets
Lord's, London
Umpires: David Millns and Mark Newell

- Middlesex won the toss and elected to field.
- Points: Middlesex 23, Glamorgan 4.

==== Glamorgan v Derbyshire (20–23 September) ====
20–23 September
Scorecard

Glamorgan	v	Derbyshire
550/5d (135.2 overs); David Lloyd 313* (398); Anuj Dal 2/67 (21.3 overs)		253 (112.4 overs); Anuj Dal 92 (212); Ajaz Patel 5/68 (38.4 overs)
273 (83.4 overs); Wayne Madsen 77 (163); Timm van der Gugten 3/41 (13.4 overs)

Glamorgan won by an innings and 24 runs
Sophia Gardens, Cardiff
Umpires: Billy Taylor and Ian Blackwell

- Derbyshire won the toss and elected to field.
- Adam Sylvester (Derbs) and Tom Bevan (Glam) made their first-class debuts.
- David Lloyd (Glam) made the highest score by a Glamorgan batter at home and the highest score by a Glamorgan captain.
- Points: Glamorgan 24, Derbyshire 2.

==== Sussex v Glamorgan (26–29 September) ====
26–29 September
Scorecard

Sussex	v	Glamorgan
533/9d (106.2 overs); Chris Cooke 141 (165); Sean Hunt 3/84 (23.2 overs)		258 (62.4 overs); Tom Haines 108* (169); Timm van der Gugten 3/56 (13.4 overs)
		554/8d (139 overs) (f/o); Ali Orr 198 (174); Andrew Salter 5/138 (54 overs)

Match drawn
County Ground, Hove
Umpires: Paul Baldwin and Tom Lungley

- Glamorgan won the toss and elected to bat.
- Points: Glamorgan 16, Sussex 11.
- Sussex deducted two points for a slow over rate.

=== Table ===
Pos	Team	Pld	W	L	T	D	Bat	Bowl	Ded	Pts	
1	Nottinghamshire (C, P)	14	8	2	0	4	45	40	4	241	Promotion to Division 1
2	Middlesex (P)	14	6	2	0	6	45	36	0	225	Promotion to Division 1
3	Glamorgan	14	6	3	0	5	43	37	0	216	
4	Worcestershire	14	4	3	0	7	38	36	0	194	
5	Derbyshire	14	3	3	0	8	37	36	0	185	
6	Durham	14	3	3	0	8	41	32	11	174	
7	Sussex	14	1	6	0	7	35	29	6	130	
8	Leicestershire	14	0	9	0	5	26	28	1	93	

Source: CricketArchive, ESPNCricinfo, ECB
(C) Champion; (P) Promoted

== One-Day Cup ==
=== Matches ===
==== Derbyshire v Glamorgan (2 August) ====
2 August
Scorecard

Derbyshire; 110 (30 overs)	v	Glamorgan; 112/2 (21.5 overs)
Mattie McKiernan 43 (57); Timm van der Gugten 4/41 (10 overs)		Kiran Carlson 54* (53); Ben Aitchison 1/14 (6 overs)

Glamorgan won by 8 wickets
County Ground, Derby
Umpires: Nigel Llong and Simon Widdup

- Glamorgan won the toss and elected to field.
- Rain reduced the match to 47 overs per side.
- Jamie McIlroy (Glam) and Nick Potts (Derbs) made their List A debuts.
- Points: Glamorgan 2, Derbyshire 0.

Glamorgan began their defence of the One-Day Cup with a trip to Derbyshire, albeit without seamer Michael Hogan and coach Matthew Maynard, who were involved in The Hundred. The visitors made quick inroads after choosing to field first, as Timm van der Gugten and competition debutant Jamie McIlroy combined to remove the hosts' top order for just six runs in the first four overs. Van der Gugten took his third wicket of the innings to limit Tom Wood's contribution to the Derbyshire response to just 18 runs, and McIlroy got a second with the dismissal of Brooke Guest for six. Derbyshire put on another 30 for the sixth wicket before Glamorgan one-day captain Kiran Carlson caught Anuj Dal off the bowling of Joe Cooke, and David Lloyd clean-bowled Mark Watt for a duck. Mattie McKiernan put on another couple of useful partnerships, with Ben Aitchison for 18 and Sam Conners for 28, before Dan Douthwaite became the fifth Glamorgan bowler to take a wicket, dismissing McKiernan for 43, leaving Derbyshire on 108/9. Conners went in the next over, Van der Gugten taking his fourth wicket, and Derbyshire were all out for 110. With a target of 110 set by the Duckworth–Lewis–Stern method, Glamorgan lost openers Lloyd (12) and Sam Northeast (10) to reach 28/2 by the end of the ninth over. Despite the shaky start, though, Colin Ingram (30) and captain Carlson (54) saw the reigning champions through to victory by 8 wickets with less than 22 overs bowled.

==== Glamorgan v Kent (4 August) ====
4 August
Scorecard

Kent; 304/8 (50 overs)	v	Glamorgan; 308/7 (48.2 overs)
Joey Evison 109 (121); Colin Ingram 2/42 (6 overs)		Colin Ingram 155 (148); George Linde 2/59 (8.2 overs)

Glamorgan won by 3 wickets
Sophia Gardens, Cardiff
Umpires: Anthony Harris and Mark Newell

- Glamorgan won the toss and elected to field.
- Points: Glamorgan 2, Kent 0.

Glamorgan's first home game of the One Day Cup season saw them put Kent in to bat, and they were rewarded with an early wicket as James Weighell removed Ben Compton with the second ball of the innings; however, Ollie Robinson – who had recorded an unbeaten double-century in a win over Worcestershire two days earlier – scored another half-century as part of a 90-run partnership with Joey Evison for the second wicket. Evison then combined with Alex Blake for 135 runs before Blake (66) was caught trying to slog David Lloyd, and Evison soon followed – caught and bowled by Colin Ingram – for 109. After that, wickets fell fairly rapidly; after Darren Stevens (18*) retired hurt with a calf injury, the remaining eight overs saw Kent lose four more wickets for just 31 runs, finishing with a final score of 304/8. The home side's response started shakily, with both openers again going cheaply; Northeast was out for a golden duck in the first over, while Lloyd (2) fell early in the fourth. Ingram and captain Kiran Carlson started the recovery with a 56-run partnership for the third wicket before Carlson (28) was bowled by Matt Quinn. That dismissal sparked a mini-collapse from Glamorgan, who also lost Billy Root and Joe Cooke to fall from 75/2 to 107/5 in the space of six overs; however, Tom Cullen's arrival at the crease saw him prove an effective partner for Ingram, as both notched their biggest scores in List A cricket (Cullen with 80 and Ingram with 155, his first century in the format for Glamorgan since 2017) on the way to a club record sixth-wicket partnership of 186. Ingram was eventually out with Glamorgan 15 runs shy of victory, but Cullen, Douthwaite (6) and Salter (1*) saw them through to a second victory of the season.

==== Glamorgan v Yorkshire (10 August) ====
10 August
Scorecard

Yorkshire; 257/9 (50 overs)	v	Glamorgan; 234 (48.5 overs)
Harry Duke 87 (117); Jamie McIlroy 2/37 (10 overs)		Kiran Carlson 64 (78); Jack Shutt 4/46 (10 overs)

Yorkshire won by 23 runs
Sophia Gardens, Cardiff
Umpires: Ben Debenham and Russell Warren

- Yorkshire won the toss and elected to bat.
- Points: Yorkshire 2, Glamorgan 0.

Glamorgan suffered their first one-day defeat of the season with the visit of Yorkshire on 10 August. After winning the toss and deciding to bat, Yorkshire jumped out to an early score of 58 before the first wicket fell, as Will Fraine hit a run-a-ball 40, including 20 off the bowling of James Weighell. As Will Luxton (19) and George Hill (9) fell, Fraine's fellow opener Harry Duke eventually put up another big partnership with captain Jonny Tattersall, the pair adding 90 for the fourth wicket before Duke was caught by Weighell off Jamie McIlroy for 87 with nine overs to go. Wickets fell quickly after that as Yorkshire searched for rapid runs to shore up their total, but only Matthew Waite reached double-figures as the visitors managed a score of 257/9 off their 50 overs. Glamorgan's response again saw them lose early wickets, as Lloyd went for 2, followed by Ingram for 7. Captain Carlson's partnerships of 41 with Northeast and 53 with Root provided some hope of a recovery, but the Glamorgan batters failed to really get going and when Carlson was caught by Tattersall off Matt Revis for 64, the home side found themselves at 146/6. Tom Cullen and Andrew Salter put on 29 for the eighth wicket and there was a final-wicket stand of 42 between Weighell and McIlroy, but Glamorgan were eventually bowled out for 234, falling 23 runs short with just seven balls remaining.

==== Northamptonshire v Glamorgan (12 August) ====
12 August
Scorecard

Glamorgan; 221 (47.3 overs)	v	Northamptonshire; 225/4 (35.5 overs)
David Lloyd 65 (72); Saif Zaib 4/23 (10 overs)		Ricardo Vasconcelos 104 (105); Kiran Carlson 4/41 (7.5 overs)

Northamptonshire won by 6 wickets
County Ground, Northampton
Umpires: Neil Mallender and Paul Nicholls

- Glamorgan won the toss and elected to bat.
- Points: Northamptonshire 2, Glamorgan 0.

Glamorgan batted first for the first time this season in their fourth match away to Northamptonshire, but were four wickets down with little over five overs bowled, losing Northeast, Ingram, Carlson and Root for single-figure scores. It was not until Joe Cooke joined David Lloyd at the crease that Glamorgan managed any real runs, as the pair put on 94 for the fifth wicket; however, the introduction of Saif Zaib into the bowling attack proved pivotal for Northamptonshire, as the left-arm spinner dismissed the entirety of Glamorgan's middle order. First he took the wickets of Lloyd (65) and Cooke (39) in successive overs, followed by Salter (20) and Cullen (24) to reduce Glamorgan to 186/8; all four were dismissed via different methods – Lloyd was caught, Cooke bowled, Salter lbw and Cullen stumped. An unbeaten 30 from Dan Douthwaite helped the visitors past 200, but he ran out of partners and Glamorgan finished on 221. Northamptonshire put on a rapid response, reaching 188 before the fall of their first wicket in the 30th over, a new club record for an opening partnership in List A cricket against Glamorgan. Despite the loss of Emilio Gay (81) and Will Young (4) in the same over, they had little left to do by that point. Ricardo Vasconcelos (104) hit the second List A century of his career, falling 8 runs short of his career best with the score at 199, but although Saif Zaib was unable to repeat his bowling heroics with the bat, Rob Keogh and Lewis McManus were able to pick up the winning runs with just under 36 overs bowled.

==== Essex v Glamorgan (14 August) ====
14 August
Scorecard

Essex; 341 (49.3 overs)	v	Glamorgan; 238 (43.5 overs)
Feroze Khushi 104 (88); Andrew Salter 3/72 (10 overs)		Sam Northeast 70 (81); Luc Benkenstein 6/42 (10 overs)

Essex won by 103 runs
County Ground, Chelmsford
Umpires: Anthony Harris and Mark Newell

- Essex won the toss and elected to bat.
- Prem Sisodiya and Tom Bevan (both Glam) made their List A debuts.

After being asked to bowl away to Essex, Glamorgan made an early start as James Harris took the wicket of Josh Rymell in the first over; however, the second-wicket partnership between Feroze Khushi and captain Tom Westley saw them put on 203 runs before Khushi was eventually bowled by David Lloyd for 104 off just 88 balls. Westley took a little longer to reach exactly the same score (110 balls) before he was stumped off the bowling of Andrew Salter, as Essex reached 248/3 with just under 13 overs to go. Debutant Prem Sisodiya chipped in with the following two wickets of Robin Das (11) and Aaron Beard (1), and he had the best economy of the Glamorgan attack, giving away just 42 runs in his 10 overs; however, it was Salter who took more wickets despite conceding more runs, the scalps of Aron Nijjar (0) and Shane Snater (2) completing his three on the day. Meanwhile, Grant Roelofsen finished the innings unbeaten on 69, having shared a final-wicket flurry of 38 with Raymond Toole, to set a total of 341. Glamorgan knocked off the first 50 of their required runs inside the first four overs, before losing Lloyd (30) to the first ball of the fifth; however, Northeast remained at the crease to share two more fifty partnerships with Ingram (17) and Carlson (29) as Glamorgan reached 159/3 just after the midway point of the innings. The wicket of Carlson was the first of the day for Essex bowler Luc Benkenstein, who also removed Northeast (70) in his next over. Benkenstein went on to take six wickets in the innings, finishing with club record figures of 6/42 as he helped reduce Glamorgan from 159/3 to 238 all out before the end of the 44th over. That left Glamorgan needing wins in each of their three remaining matches to keep their hopes of retaining their one-day title alive.

==== Glamorgan v Lancashire (17 August) ====
17 August
Scorecard

Glamorgan; 177 (45.1 overs)	v	Lancashire; 180/1 (36 overs)
Colin Ingram 54 (75); Tom Bailey 3/22 (8.1 overs)		Keaton Jennings 77* (101); Kiran Carlson 1/28 (6 overs)

Lancashire won by 9 wickets
The Gnoll, Neath
Umpires: Jack Shantry and Paul Baldwin

- Lancashire won the toss and elected to field.
- Points: Lancashire 2, Glamorgan 0.

In their first match at The Gnoll in Neath for 27 years (and their first home match away from Cardiff for three years), Glamorgan were put in to bat by Lancashire, who made early inroads by taking the wickets of Tom Bevan and Sam Northeast to leave Glamorgan at 5/2 inside the first four overs. Half-century partnerships between Colin Ingram and both captain Kiran Carlson (22) and Joe Cooke (40) helped them back to 129/4, but the loss of Cooke and then Ingram 16 runs later meant Lancashire were into the Glamorgan tail with less than 150 runs scored. The home side then lost Weighell (9) and Cullen (11) to consecutive balls as the innings passed 38 overs, and both Ruaidhri Smith – making his return from injury – and Prem Sisodiya fell soon after to close the innings at 177. Lancashire's openers made a quick response, putting on 83 runs before Luke Wells was trapped lbw by Carlson the ball after reaching his half-century. Wells' partner, captain Keaton Jennings, then combined with Josh Bohannon to see off the remaining 95 runs, reaching his fifty in 71 balls before finishing on 77, while Bohannon hit a four to seal the win, albeit leaving him stranded on 48.

==== Glamorgan v Hampshire (19 August) ====
19 August
Scorecard

Hampshire; 228/9 (50 overs)	v	Glamorgan; 229/3 (31.4 overs)
Nick Gubbins 93 (124); Andy Gorvin 2/41 (9 overs)		Tom Bevan 134 (103); Scott Currie 2/64 (7 overs)

Glamorgan won by 7 wickets
The Gnoll, Neath
Umpires: Rob White and Sue Redfern

- Glamorgan won the toss and elected to field.
- Points: Glamorgan 2, Hampshire 0.

Glamorgan won the toss in their second match at Neath two days later and elected to have a bowl at Hampshire. A flurry of early wickets fell, leaving the visitors at 54/4 after 15 overs and then 99/5 after 27, but opener Nick Gubbins led a patient fightback, assisted by Ian Holland for a partnership of 72, before Gubbins was finally out for 93 with Hampshire on 171/6. Holland then took up the baton, helping the visitors to a further 50 runs, finishing unbeaten on 63 on the way to a team total of 228/9. As in most of their previous one-day games this season, Glamorgan lost an early wicket as they began their run chase, Chris Cooke going for a five-ball duck; however, Tom Bevan and Colin Ingram combined to put on 203 runs for the second wicket before Bevan (134) was caught in the deep, falling one run shy of their List A record second-wicket partnership. Kiran Carlson (6) went soon after, but Ingram was able to put on the winning runs in his final match for the county in 2022.

==== Worcestershire v Glamorgan (23 August) ====
23 August
Scorecard

Glamorgan; 356/3 (50 overs)	v	Worcestershire; 337/9 (50 overs)
Sam Northeast 177* (148); Joe Leach 2/32 (7 overs)		Ben Cox 84* (78); Prem Sisodiya 3/76 (10 overs)

Glamorgan won by 19 runs
New Road, Worcester
Umpires: Nick Cook and Rob White

- Worcestershire won the toss and elected to field.
- Points: Glamorgan 2, Worcestershire 0.

In the final group match, Glamorgan were put in to bat by Worcestershire and lost both Tom Bevan and Chris Cooke by the end of the seventh over to reduce the Welsh side to 16/2; however, Sam Northeast rediscovered his form from July and combined with captain Kiran Carlson (41) to put on 95 runs for the third wicket. By that point, Northeast had reached his half-century off 68 balls, and it took him just 46 more to reach his maiden List A century of the season. In the same over, Billy Root reached 50 two balls quicker than Northeast had, but it took Northeast just 23 more deliveries to reach 150, surpassing his previous best List A score of 132 in the process. By the end of the 48th over, he had surpassed Jacques Rudolph's club record total of 169, set against Sussex at Hove in 2014. In the following over, Root joined Northeast in making a century by hitting five sixes off the over. The Glamorgan innings closed on a score of 356/3, with Northeast on 177 and Root on 113; their partnership was ultimately worth 245 runs, surpassing the fourth-wicket record set by Root and Cooke away to Gloucestershire in 2018. Like Glamorgan, Worcestershire lost early wickets in their attempt to chase down the total. Jake Libby (58) and Joe Leach (63) both made half-centuries as the home side made the target seem more attainable, but regular wickets – including three from Prem Sisodiya – meant Ben Cox's unbeaten 84 was in a losing cause. Glamorgan's victory meant they still had a chance of making the knockout stage, but although Yorkshire lost, Kent's victory over Lancashire meant Glamorgan finished fourth in the group.

=== Table ===
Pos	Team	Pld	W	L	T	NR	Ded	Pts	NRR
1	Hampshire	8	7	1	0	0	0	14	0.595
2	Lancashire	8	5	2	0	1	0	11	0.555
3	Kent	8	4	3	0	1	0	9	−0.818
4	Glamorgan	8	4	4	0	0	0	8	−0.042
5	Yorkshire	8	4	4	0	0	0	8	−0.126
6	Essex	8	3	4	0	1	0	7	0.810
7	Derbyshire	8	3	4	0	1	2	5	−0.351
8	Northamptonshire	8	2	6	0	0	0	4	−0.067
9	Worcestershire	8	2	6	0	0	0	4	−0.452

Updated to match(es) played on completed. Source: BBC Sport, ECB, Cricinfo.
- Advanced directly to the semi-finals
- Advanced to the quarter-finals

== T20 Blast ==
=== Matches ===
==== Sussex v Glamorgan (26 May) ====
26 May (D/N)
Scorecard

Sussex; 150/6 (20 overs)	v	Glamorgan; 153/3 (18.5 overs)
Mohammad Rizwan 81* (60); Michael Hogan 3/26 (4 overs)		Sam Northeast 63* (52); Steven Finn 1/13 (1 over)

Glamorgan won by 7 wickets
County Ground, Hove
Umpires: Mike Burns and Neil Bainton

- Glamorgan won the toss and elected to field.
- Points: Glamorgan 2, Sussex 0.

Glamorgan began their T20 Blast campaign away to Sussex at Hove, where they had never won before in the 20-over format. They won the toss and put Sussex in to bat; Michael Hogan, playing in his first T20 match since 2019, took the first wicket of Luke Wright and ended up with figures of 3/26 as Glamorgan limited the hosts to 150/6 off their 20 overs. Opener Mohammad Rizwan finished unbeaten on 81, but he found partners hard to come by, as none of them managed more than 13. Glamorgan captain David Lloyd went early in their response, having contributed all 15 of their runs to that point; however, Sam Northeast combined with Marnus Labuschagne to put on 82 for the second wicket, and then with Kiran Carlson for 41 for the third, to ease the visitors towards the total. Northeast finished not out on 63 as Glamorgan reached the target with seven balls – and seven wickets – to spare.

==== Surrey v Glamorgan (27 May) ====
27 May (D/N)
Scorecard

Glamorgan; 173/5 (20 overs)	v	Surrey; 174/6 (19.5 overs)
Sam Northeast 65 (51); Sunil Narine 1/17 (4 overs)		Ollie Pope 62 (46); Michael Hogan 5/18 (4 overs)

Surrey won by 4 wickets
The Oval, London
Umpires: Paul Baldwin and Tim Robinson

- Surrey won the toss and elected to field.
- Points: Surrey 2, Glamorgan 0.

Glamorgan's second match saw them put in to bat by Surrey, and they again lost captain Lloyd (3) early. Labuschagne (20) followed in the seventh over, before Carlson (9) was caught at short fine leg by Reece Topley off the bowling of debutant Sunil Narine. At the other end, though, Northeast soon reached another half-century, and a quickfire 46 from Chris Cooke helped Glamorgan to a fourth-wicket partnership of 63. Northeast was dismissed for 65 in the penultimate over, leaving Dan Douthwaite and Joe Cooke to get the visitors to a final total of 173/5. Surrey's reply saw Hogan remove openers Jason Roy (15) and Will Jacks (6) in quick succession in the third over. That only brought Ollie Pope to the crease, though, and his partnerships with Laurie Evans, Sam Curran and Jordan Clark on the way to an individual score of 62 rescued Surrey from a score of 23/2 to 165/4. Hogan removed Curran in the 15th over to draw level with Dean Cosker as Glamorgan's highest wicket-taker in Twenty20 cricket, before surpassing Cosker with the wickets of Pope and Clark in the penultimate over to reduce Surrey to 166/6. That left the hosts needing eight runs off the final over, which Jamie Overton and Chris Jordan navigated successfully with a ball to spare.

==== Middlesex v Glamorgan (29 May) ====
29 May
Scorecard

Glamorgan; 168 (20 overs)	v	Middlesex; 172/6 (19 overs)
Marnus Labuschagne 38 (24); Toby Roland-Jones 4/22 (4 overs)		Joe Cracknell 47 (28); Prem Sisodiya 2/26 (4 overs)

Middlesex won by 4 wickets
Brunton Memorial Ground, Radlett
Umpires: Nigel Llong and Tim Robinson

- Middlesex won the toss and elected to field.
- Points: Middlesex 2, Glamorgan 0.

Glamorgan continued their T20 Blast campaign with a third straight away game, and were put in to bat by Middlesex. After again losing captain Lloyd early, the visitors also lost Northeast before the end of the third over. Labuschagne's 38 got the innings back on track before leg-spinner Luke Hollman tempted him into skying a catch by Martin Andersson, and both Carlson and Cooke hit valuable 20s before they were dismissed. James Weighell then hit a late-innings 30 off 20 balls before becoming one of three Glamorgan batters to fall to Toby Roland-Jones in the final over. Chasing a total of 168, Middlesex made a good start despite Eoin Morgan not batting due to an injury suffered in the first innings; they reached 71 before the loss of their first wicket at the end of the seventh over, Max Holden going for 41. Stephen Eskinazi (34) and Hollman (7) fell in quick succession either side of the midway point of the innings, but Joe Cracknell's partnerships with John Simpson and then Andersson meant Middlesex needed just eight more runs by the time Cracknell was bowled by Labuschagne at the end of the 17th over. Morgan was padded up and ready to bat by this point, but Chris Green and Roland-Jones hit the required runs to give Middlesex a four-wicket victory with an over remaining.

==== Glamorgan v Essex (2 June) ====
2 June (D/N)
Scorecard

Essex; 113/9 (20 overs)	v	Glamorgan; 114/4 (16.5 overs)
Matt Critchley 38 (26); Michael Neser 3/13 (4 overs)		Sam Northeast 44 (44); Matt Critchley 1/17 (4 overs)

Glamorgan won by 6 wickets
Sophia Gardens, Cardiff
Umpires: Alex Wharf and Russell Warren
Player of the match: Michael Hogan (Glam)

- Glamorgan won the toss and elected to field.
- Points: Glamorgan 2, Essex 0.

==== Somerset v Glamorgan (3 June) ====
3 June (D/N)
Scorecard

Glamorgan; 173/7 (20 overs)	v	Somerset; 174/1 (14.1 overs)
David Lloyd 31 (20); Ben Green 5/29 (4 overs)		Will Smeed 94* (41); Prem Sisodiya 1/30 (3 overs)

Somerset won by 9 wickets
County Ground, Taunton
Umpires: Graham Lloyd and Mark Newell

- Somerset won the toss and elected to field.
- Points: Somerset 2, Glamorgan 0.

==== Glamorgan v Surrey (5 June) ====
5 June
Scorecard

Surrey; 160/9 (20 overs)	v	Glamorgan; 9/0 (1.3 overs)
Jamie Overton 48 (21); Marnus Labuschagne 2/27 (4 overs)		David Lloyd 7* (7)

No result
Sophia Gardens, Cardiff
Umpires: Alex Wharf and Nick Cook

- Glamorgan won the toss and elected to field.
- Points: Surrey 1, Glamorgan 1.

==== Glamorgan v Gloucestershire (7 June) ====
7 June (D/N)
Scorecard

Glamorgan; 158/8 (20 overs)	v	Gloucestershire; 159/5 (19 overs)
David Lloyd 68 (43); Glenn Phillips 2/22 (3 overs)		James Bracey 63 (49); Dan Douthwaite 3/30 (4 overs)

Gloucestershire won by 5 wickets
Sophia Gardens, Cardiff
Umpires: Ian Blackwell and Neil Mallender

- Gloucestershire won the toss and elected to field.
- Points: Gloucestershire 2, Glamorgan 0.

==== Glamorgan v Hampshire (10 June) ====
10 June (D/N)
Scorecard

Hampshire; 134/4 (20 overs)	v	Glamorgan; 125 (19.5 overs)
Joe Weatherley 46* (36); Andrew Salter 2/18 (4 overs)		Sam Northeast 36 (40); Brad Wheal 5/38 (3.5 overs)

Hampshire won by 9 runs
Sophia Gardens, Cardiff
Umpires: Neil Mallender and Paul Baldwin

- Glamorgan won the toss and elected to field.
- Points: Hampshire 2, Glamorgan 0.

==== Gloucestershire v Glamorgan (18 June) ====
18 June
Scorecard

Gloucestershire	v	Glamorgan

No result
County Ground, Bristol
Umpires: David Millns and Hassan Adnan

- Gloucestershire won the toss.
- Points: Gloucestershire 1, Glamorgan 1.

==== Glamorgan v Sussex (19 June) ====
19 June
Scorecard

Glamorgan; 149/8 (20 overs)	v	Sussex; 151/6 (19 overs)
Luke Wright 46 (35); Michael Neser 3/24 (4 overs)		Colin Ingram 57 (43); Tymal Mills 3/30 (4 overs)

Glamorgan won by 4 wickets
Sophia Gardens, Cardiff
Umpires: Paul Baldwin and Russell Warren

- Glamorgan won the toss and elected to field.
- Points: Glamorgan 2, Sussex 0.

==== Glamorgan v Middlesex (21 June) ====
21 June (D/N)
Scorecard

Middlesex; 171/7 (20 overs)	v	Glamorgan; 172/2 (14.2 overs)
Max Holden 58 (51); Michael Hogan 3/28 (4 overs)		Sam Northeast 89 (46); Jason Behrendorff 1/22 (3 overs)

Glamorgan won by 8 wickets
Sophia Gardens, Cardiff
Umpires: Billy Taylor and Ian Blackwell

- Glamorgan won the toss and elected to field.
- Points: Glamorgan 2, Middlesex 0.

==== Glamorgan v Somerset (24 June) ====
24 June (D/N)
Scorecard

Somerset; 75/6 (7 overs)	v	Glamorgan; 59/5 (7 overs)
Tom Abell 26 (14); Michael Neser 3/19 (2 overs)		Colin Ingram 37* (19); Ben Green 2/13 (2 overs)

Somerset won by 16 runs
Sophia Gardens, Cardiff
Umpires: Paul Baldwin and Paul Pollard

- Glamorgan won the toss and elected to field.
- Rain reduced the match to 7 overs a side.
- Points: Somerset 2, Glamorgan 0.

==== Essex v Glamorgan (2 July) ====
2 July (D/N)
Scorecard

Essex; 254/5 (20 overs)	v	Glamorgan; 185/7 (20 overs)
Dan Lawrence 71 (37); Jamie McIlroy 2/32 (4 overs)		Sam Northeast 97* (56); Daniel Sams 3/20 (4 overs)

Essex won by 69 runs
County Ground, Chelmsford
Umpires: Ben Debenham and Rob Bailey
Player of the match: Dan Lawrence (Essex)

- Glamorgan won the toss and elected to field.
- Jamie McIlroy and Thomas Bevan (both Glam) made their T20 debuts.
- Points: Essex 2, Glamorgan 0.

==== Kent v Glamorgan (3 July) ====
3 July (D/N)
Scorecard

Glamorgan; 190/5 (20 overs)	v	Kent; 155 (17.2 overs)
Dan Douthwaite 51 (23); Qais Ahmad 2/36 (4 overs)		Darren Stevens 34 (22); Jamie McIlroy 3/31 (3 overs)

Glamorgan won by 35 runs
St Lawrence Ground, Canterbury
Umpires: Mark Newell and Neil Bainton

- Glamorgan won the toss and elected to bat.
- Points: Glamorgan 2, Kent 0.

=== Table ===
Pos	Team	Pld	W	L	T	NR	Pts	NRR
1	Surrey	14	10	3	0	1	21	0.630
2	Somerset	14	10	4	0	0	20	0.630
3	Essex Eagles	14	9	4	0	1	19	0.881
4	Hampshire Hawks	14	9	5	0	0	18	0.198
5	Gloucestershire	14	6	6	0	2	14	0.022
6	Glamorgan	14	5	7	0	2	12	—
7	Sussex Sharks	14	4	10	0	0	8	—
8	Middlesex	14	4	10	0	0	8	—
9	Kent Spitfires	14	3	11	0	0	6	—

Source: BBC Sport, England and Wales Cricket Board

Advances to quarter-finals

== Statistics ==
=== Batting ===
First-class
Player	Matches	Innings	NO	Runs	HS	Ave	SR	100	50	0	4s	6s
Sam Northeast	14	24	4	1,189	410*	59.45	67.48	2	5	3	138	6
David Lloyd	14	25	2	899	313*	39.08	69.42	1	5	2	123	6
Chris Cooke	13	21	6	840	191*	56.00	59.61	2	5	1	90	8
Colin Ingram	5	9	0	596	178	66.22	59.60	3	1	1	86	1
Eddie Byrom	8	13	1	588	176	49.00	56.00	2	2	0	84	4
Kiran Carlson	12	22	1	491	91	23.38	57.76	0	3	4	67	2
Billy Root	9	14	1	418	99*	32.15	49.94	0	4	2	47	0
Marnus Labuschagne	5	10	1	377	130	41.88	64.11	1	2	0	49	4
Andrew Salter	12	17	2	284	45*	18.93	45.36	0	0	2	37	4
Michael Neser	9	12	1	277	62	25.18	60.34	0	1	0	36	3
Source: ESPNcricinfo

List A
Player	Matches	Innings	NO	Runs	HS	Ave	SR	100	50	0	4s	6s
Colin Ingram	7	7	2	342	155	68.40	92.18	1	2	0	37	6
Sam Northeast	7	7	1	291	177*	48.50	95.40	1	1	1	32	4
Kiran Carlson	8	8	1	248	64	35.42	85.81	0	2	0	26	1
Tom Bevan	4	4	0	158	134	39.50	106.04	1	0	1	17	9
Tom Cullen	7	5	1	146	80*	36.50	75.64	0	1	0	11	0
Billy Root	6	5	2	136	113*	45.33	101.49	1	0	0	7	7
David Lloyd	5	5	0	111	65	22.20	89.51	0	1	0	19	0
Joe Cooke	7	4	0	92	40	23.00	84.40	0	0	0	11	1
James Weighell	7	4	0	62	33	15.50	84.93	0	0	0	4	1
Andrew Salter	5	4	2	59	27*	29.50	67.81	0	0	0	5	1
Source: ESPNcricinfo

Twenty20
Player	Matches	Innings	NO	Runs	HS	Ave	SR	100	50	0	4s	6s
Sam Northeast	14	13	3	510	97*	51.00	125.30	0	4	1	42	16
David Lloyd	12	11	1	213	68	21.30	142.95	0	2	1	28	6
Dan Douthwaite	14	10	5	180	51*	36.00	183.67	0	1	0	11	14
Colin Ingram	8	7	2	152	57	30.40	134.51	0	1	0	12	6
Chris Cooke	10	9	2	152	46	21.71	131.03	0	0	0	11	7
Kiran Carlson	12	10	1	146	28	16.22	114.06	0	0	0	12	5
Marnus Labuschagne	6	5	0	118	41	23.60	132.58	0	0	0	13	3
Eddie Byrom	10	7	0	67	37	9.57	113.55	0	0	3	7	3
James Weighell	10	4	1	42	30	14.00	161.53	0	0	1	1	4
Billy Root	2	2	1	39	38*	39.00	134.48	0	0	0	1	3
Source: ESPNcricinfo

=== Bowling ===
First-class
Player	Matches	Innings	Overs	Maidens	Runs	Wickets	BBI	BBM	Ave	Econ	SR	5w	10w
Michael Hogan	14	23	418.4	78	1,235	45	4/43	7/131	27.44	2.94	55.8	0	0
Michael Neser	9	17	328.0	64	931	37	4/50	7/90	25.16	2.83	53.1	0	0
Andrew Salter	12	22	390.3	62	1,083	33	7/45	7/45	32.81	2.77	71.0	2	0
James Harris	11	19	317.0	46	1,181	31	5/90	5/106	38.09	3.72	61.3	1	0
Timm van der Gugten	9	13	241.0	46	708	24	4/60	6/78	29.50	2.93	60.2	0	0
Ajaz Patel	4	7	169.0	37	519	14	5/68	6/139	37.07	3.07	72.4	1	0
Marnus Labuschagne	5	9	79.5	8	287	10	3/35	3/77	28.70	3.59	47.9	0	0
David Lloyd	14	17	184.0	28	708	9	2/36	2/40	78.66	3.84	122.6	0	0
James Weighell	4	7	100.5	18	346	6	2/25	2/74	57.66	3.43	100.8	0	0
Andy Gorvin	3	6	66.0	14	187	5	2/35	3/46	37.40	2.83	79.2	0	0
Source: ESPNcricinfo

List A
Player	Matches	Innings	Overs	Maidens	Runs	Wickets	BBI	Ave	Econ	SR	4w	5w
Kiran Carlson	8	5	29.5	0	153	9	4/41	17.00	5.12	19.8	1	0
Dan Douthwaite	7	7	49.0	2	301	8	2/43	37.62	6.14	36.7	0	0
James Weighell	7	7	58.3	1	343	8	2/52	42.87	5.86	43.8	0	0
Prem Sisodiya	4	4	34.0	1	178	6	3/76	29.66	5.23	34.0	0	0
Jamie McIlroy	3	3	27.0	3	107	5	2/13	21.40	3.96	32.4	0	0
Timm van der Gugten	1	1	10.0	0	41	4	4/41	10.25	4.10	15.0	1	0
David Lloyd	5	3	11.0	1	61	4	2/21	15.25	5.54	16.5	0	0
Andrew Salter	5	4	32.0	1	185	4	3/72	46.25	5.78	48.0	0	0
Colin Ingram	7	4	19.0	0	133	3	2/42	44.33	7.00	38.0	0	0
Andy Gorvin	3	3	21.0	0	116	2	2/41	58.00	5.52	63.0	0	0
Source: ESPNcricinfo

Twenty20
Player	Matches	Innings	Overs	Maidens	Runs	Wickets	BBI	Ave	Econ	SR	4w	5w
Michael Hogan	11	11	41.0	0	333	20	5/18	16.65	8.12	12.3	0	1
Prem Sisodiya	14	13	46.0	0	386	14	2/19	27.57	8.39	19.7	0	0
Michael Neser	10	9	31.0	0	241	13	3/13	18.53	7.77	14.3	0	0
Dan Douthwaite	14	13	42.2	0	390	11	3/30	35.45	9.21	23.0	0	0
Andrew Salter	9	7	24.0	0	195	7	2/18	27.85	8.12	20.5	0	0
Jamie McIlroy	2	2	7.0	0	63	5	3/31	12.60	9.00	8.4	0	0
Marnus Labuschagne	6	6	12.0	0	103	3	2/27	34.33	8.58	24.0	0	0
James Weighell	10	9	24.0	0	209	3	1/17	69.66	8.70	48.0	0	0
David Lloyd	12	3	4.0	0	35	0	—	—	8.75	—	0	0
James Harris	2	2	5.0	0	58	0	—	—	11.60	—	0	0
Source: ESPNcricinfo
