= King Ecgbert School =

Academy in Sheffield, South Yorkshire, England

Location
- Totley Brook Road; Sheffield, South Yorkshire, S17 3QU; England; 53.3205°N 1.5368°W

Information
- Type: Academy
- Opened: 1969
- Department for Education URN: 138841 Tables
- Ofsted: Reports
- Headteacher: Paul Haigh
- Gender: Mixed
- Age: 11 to 18
- Enrolment: 1,350 (as of 2020)
- Website: www.ecgbert.sheffield.sch.uk

King Ecgbert School is a co-educational secondary school with academy status (age range 11–18) in the village of Dore in the south-west of Sheffield, South Yorkshire, England. The headteacher (from January 2017) is Paul Haigh. The school is named in honour of King Egbert of Wessex, who became recognised as overlord of England at Dore in 829.

Originally opened in 1957 on Furniss Avenue as a girls-only secondary technical school, King Ecgbert eventually became comprehensive in 1969 when it amalgamated with Abbeydale Secondary School and Greystones Secondary when they were closed down. About half its intake comes from local primary schools in Dore and Totley (for example Dore Primary School, Totley All Saints and Totley Primary) and much of the remainder from the Sheaf valley, running from Dore and Totley to the city centre.

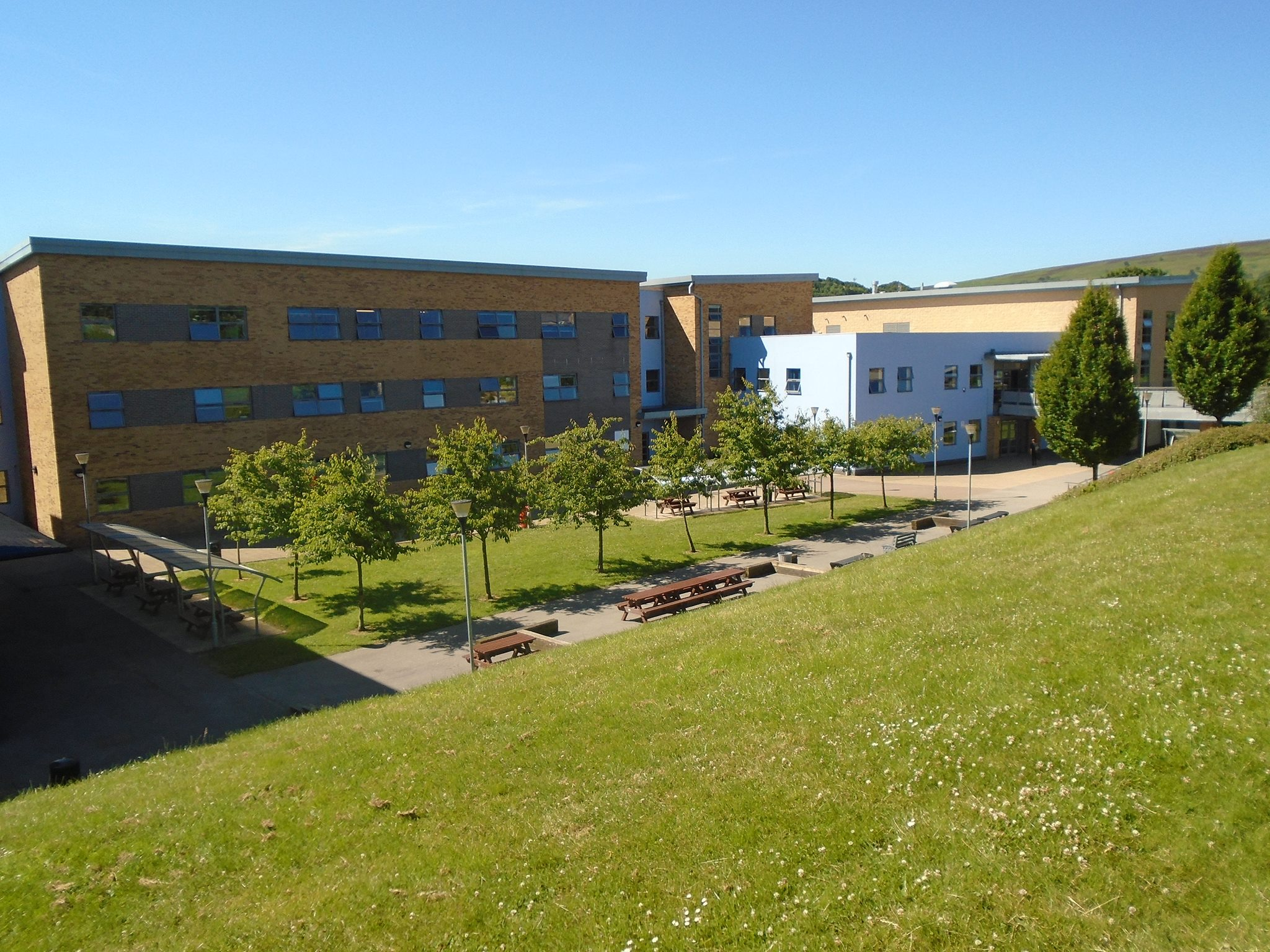
The front of the school building (2018)

The School celebrated its 50th anniversary in 2019, and threw a party to celebrate the occasion along with former students being invited back to the school.

== Features ==
After two years under construction, a new three-storey building was opened to students in Easter 2005. Previously the school had been split between two sites, 'Mercia' and 'Wessex'. This building has space for Years 7–11 students, Sixth Form students, a drama studio and an astroturf with an indoor sports hall, known as the “Jessica-Ennis Sports Hall”. In March 2024, the school opened its brand-new Sixth Form building, opened by the Lord Mayor of Sheffield.

The school was given good grades in an Ofsted report, rising from 'good' to 'outstanding' in May 2013. The school used to be a specialist technology college, until it became an academy in 2012.

In 2013, the school's Sports Hall was renamed to the 'Jessica Ennis Sports Hall', after its Alumna, the Olympic gold medallist Jessica Ennis DBE

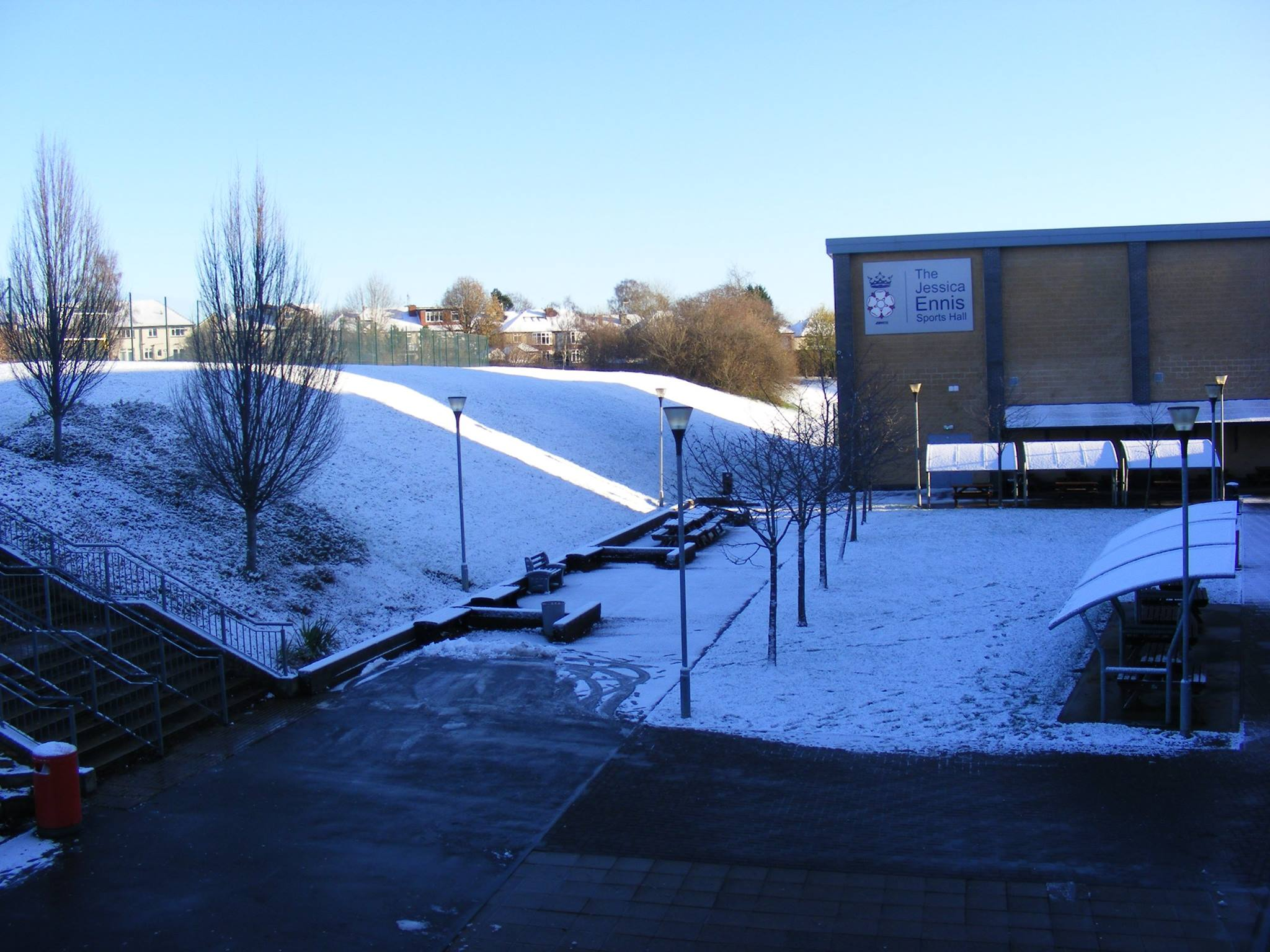
The School, and the Jessica Ennis Sports Hall in the snow (2017)

The old 'Mercia' School site was demolished in 2005, and construction of a housing estate was completed on the site in 2019, but the school still uses the playing field which was left intact adjacent to the school's original position.

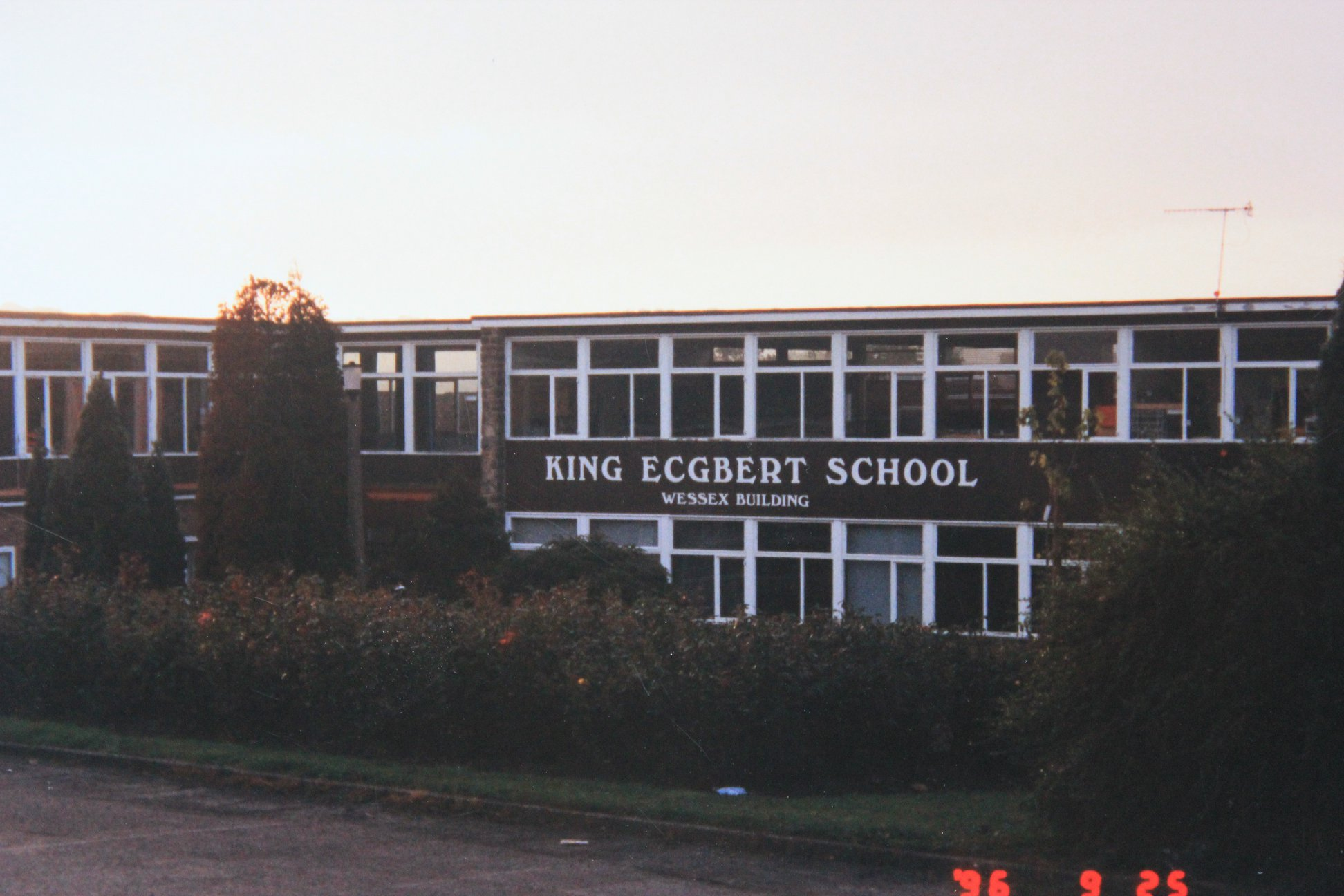
The original 1957 school building before its demolition (1996)

== Notable alumni ==
- Matthew Beard, actor
- Jessica Ennis, athlete
- Gina Higginbottom, academic and nurse
- Paul "Silky" Jones, boxer
- Joe Root, cricketer
- Jon Shaw, footballer
- Tom Wrigglesworth, comedian and broadcaster
- Billy Root, brother of England test captain Joe Root
- Lem Knights, West End performer, The Voice UK contestant
- Vadaine Oliver, footballer
