= Gina Higginbottom =

British academic, nurse, and midwife

Dr Gina Higginbottom MBE
- Born: Gina Awoko; Sheffield, England, UK
- Title: Professor
- Awards: National Primary Care Fellowship Smith & Nephew Nursing Research Scholar Mary Seacole Leadership Award Canada Research Chair Fellow Queens Nursing Institute Fellow American Academy of Nursing

Academic background
- Education: University of Sheffield

Academic work
- Discipline: Health
- Sub-discipline: Ethnicity and Community Health
- Institutions: University of Alberta, University of Nottingham
- Website: https://ginahigginbottom.com

Gina Marie Higginbottom MBE (née Awoko) is a British academic, nurse, midwife, health visitor and a specialist in international migration and maternity. She is the first nurse of black and minority ethnic (BME) origin to hold a professorial role in a Russell Group university in England.

== Personal life and education ==
Higginbottom was born in Sheffield and is of white British and Ghanaian origin (Ga-Mashie, Jamestown, Accra. She is via her maternal family a descendant of the historic Bagley family. Edward Bagley of Dudley, executed the will of Lady Barnham, granddaughter of William Shakespeare She passed the eleven plus examination and attended King Ecgbert Technical Grammar School for Girls. Her cousin is Richard Kirk of Cabaret Voltaire and her brother in Law Martin Fry of ABC. She gained her PhD co-supervised by Prof James Nazroo at the University of Sheffield in 2004. Higginbottom was the first BME nurse to be awarded a National Primary Care Fellowship.

== Career ==
From 2007 to 2015 Higginbottom held a Tier II Canada Research Chair in Ethnicity and Health at the University of Alberta. She is the first woman of BME origin to hold a Canada Research Chair.

Higginbottom was appointed in 2015 as the Mary Seacole Professor of Ethnicity and Community Health at the University of Nottingham. As of 2019, she is now Emeritus Professor. She was ethnicity and health advisor, co-author of the critical research study on the Apgar score and other neonatal tests and infants with darker skin which challenged existing approaches to neonatal assessment.

She is Co-Convener of International Collaboration for Community Health Nursing Research (ICCHNR), a charity and professional organisation. She is also a member of the Chief Nurse for England's Black Minority Ethnic Advisory Group. 2019 - 2025 she was vice-president of the Community Practitioners’ and Health Visitors’ Association (CPHVA), a professional organisation and trade union for nurses, together with Sara Rowbotham.

== Honours ==
Higginbottom was awarded an MBE (Member of the Order of the British Empire) in the Queen's Birthday Honours list in 1998 for services to health promotion and young people.

== Selected works ==
- Soltani H, Fair R, Higginbottom GMA, & Puntis, S (2023) Inclusive assessments for newborns Community Practitioner Nov/Dec 2023
- Fair R, Furness A, Higginbottom GMA, Oddie B & Solani R (2023) Review of neonatal assessment and practice in Black, Asian and minority ethnic newborns: exploring the Apgar score, the detection-of cyanosis and jaundice. NHS Race and Health Observatory
- Sobranie S, Cox G, Miller S, Higginbottom GMA (2021) Optimising the activities and the products of academic and student collaborative networks to achieve equality, diversity. Journal of Educational Innovation, Partnership and Change, Vol 7, No 1, 2021
- Higginbottom GMA, Evans C, Morgan M, Bharj K K, Eldridge J and Hussain B (2020) Interventions that improve maternity care for immigrant women in England: a narrative synthesis systematic review Health Serv Deliv Res 2020:03 DOI:10.3310/hsdr08140
- Higginbottom GMA, Evans C, Morgan M, Bharj K K, Eldridge J and Hussain B (2019) Immigrant women’s experience of maternity care services in the UK:a narrative synthesis review BMJ Open DOI:10.1136/bmjopen-2019-029478
- Higginbottom GMA, Vallianatos H, Shankar J, Safipour J and Davey C, (2017).Immigrant women’s food choices in pregnancy: Perspectives from women of Chinese origin in Canada Ethnicity and Health.
- Higginbottom, G, Evans, C, Morgan, M, Bharj, K, Eldridge, J and Hussain, B, (2017).Interventions that improve maternity care for immigrant women in the UK: Protocol for a narrative synthesis systematic review BMJ Open. 7, e016988
- Evans, C, Tweheyo, R, Mcgarry, J, Eldridge, J, Mccormick, C, Nkoyo, V and Higginbottom, G, (2017).What are the experiences of seeking, receiving and providing FGM-related healthcare? Perspectives of health professionals and women/girls who have undergone FGM: Protocol for a systematic review of qualitative evidence, BMJ Open. 7,
- Higginbottom GMA, Safipour J, O'brien B, Mumtaz Z, Paton P, Chiu Y and Barolia R, (2016).An ethnographic investigation of maternity healthcare experience of immigrants in rural and urban Alberta, Canada: DOI: 10.1186/s12884-015-0773-z BMC Pregnancy and Childbirth
- Higginbottom GMA, Reime, B, Bharj K K, Chowbey P, Ertan K, Foster C, Friedrich K, Gerrish K, Kentenich H, Mumtaz Z and O'brien B, (2013).Migration and maternity: insights of context, health policy and research evidence on experiences and outcomes from a three-country preliminary study across Germany, Canada and the UK. Health Care for Women International. 34(11), 936-965
- Higginbottom GMA, Morgan M, O'Mahoney M, Chiu Y, Kocay D, Alexandre M and Fogeron J, (2013). Immigrant women’s experiences of postpartum depression in Canada: a protocol for systematic review using a narrative synthesis. Systematic Reviews. 65
- Higginbottom GMA, Safipour J, Mumtaz Z, Patton P and Chiu Y, (2013). "I have to do what I believe": Sudanese women’s belief and resistance to hegemonic practices at home and during experiences of maternity care in Canada. BMC Pregnancy and Childbirth. 51
- Salway S, Barley R, Allmark P, Gerrish K, Higginbottom GMA and Ellison G (2011). Ethnic diversity in social science research: ethical and scientific rigour. Joseph Rowntree Foundation.
- Higginbottom, GMA and Serrant-Green, L (2005). "Developing Culturally Sensitive Skills in Health and Social Care with a Focus on Conducting Research with African Caribbean Communities in England". The Qualitative Report. 10 (4): 662–686. ISSN 1052-0147.
- Higginbottom GMA, Marsh P, Kirkham M, Owen Jm.Gma, Mathers N. (2006). "Young people of minority ethnic origin in England and early parenthood: views from young parents and service providers". Social Science & Medicine. 63 (4): 858–870. doi:10.1016/j.socscimed.2006.03.011
