= Clarion Club House =

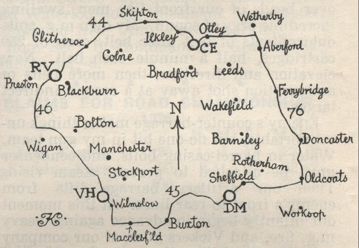
Map by Kuklos featuring circular route linking Valley House (VH), Ribble Valley (RV), Chevin End (CE) and Dore Moor (DM)

A Clarion Club House was a building used by a Clarion Cycling Club. A number of these were established across England. They were a series of rural facilities which provided accommodation for the various local clubs affiliated to the National Clarion Cycling Club.

== Dore Moor Clarion Club House ==
The Dore Moor Clarion Club House was built in 1920 in Dore, previously in Derbyshire but now a suburb of Sheffield. The foundation stone was laid by "Archbishop" Bill Munslow. The club house was in use until 1967, by which time the club house was more or less defunct.

== Nelson Clarion Club House ==
Nelson Clarion Club House is the last remaining Clarion Club House still operating. It was founded in 1912 with a loan from the Nelson Weavers' Association.

== Ribble Valley Clarion Club House ==
The Ribble Valley Clarion Club House was opened in 1913 by the North Lancashire Union of the National Clarion Cycling Club. It provided both indoor accommodation and space for camping.
