= Billy Root (cricketer) =

English cricketer (born 1992)

Personal information
- Full name: William Thomas Root
- Born: 5 August 1992 (age 34); Sheffield, South Yorkshire, England
- Batting: Left-handed
- Bowling: Right-arm off break
- Relatives: Joe Root (brother)

Domestic team information
- Years: Team
- 2015–2018: Nottinghamshire (squad no. 66)
- 2015–2016: Leeds/Bradford MCCU
- 2019–2026: Glamorgan (squad no. 7)
- FC debut: 2 April 2015 Leeds/Bradford MCCU v Sussex
- LA debut: 27 April 2017 Nottinghamshire v Worcestershire

Career statistics
| Competition | FC | LA | T20 |
|---|---|---|---|
| Matches | 84 | 60 | 50 |
| Runs scored | 4,166 | 1,665 | 634 |
| Batting average | 32.29 | 40.60 | 21.13 |
| 100s/50s | 7/18 | 3/9 | 0/0 |
| Top score | 229 | 113* | 41* |
| Balls bowled | 389 | 292 | 18 |
| Wickets | 8 | 6 | 0 |
| Bowling average | 34.37 | 51.66 | – |
| 5 wickets in innings | 0 | 0 | – |
| 10 wickets in match | 0 | 0 | – |
| Best bowling | 3/29 | 2/36 | – |
| Catches/stumpings | 27/– | 14/– | 18/– |
- Source: ESPNcricinfo, 27 September 2026

William Thomas Root (born 5 August 1992) is a retired English cricketer who played for Glamorgan. Primarily a left-handed batsman, he also bowled right-arm off break. He is the brother of England Test Captain Joe Root.

== Early life ==
Root is the youngest son of Helen and Matt Root and grew up in Dore, Sheffield. He attended King Ecgbert School in Sheffield and Worksop College as a weekly boarder.

Root and his brother played under-11s cricket for Rotherham Town CC and then, like their father, joined Sheffield Collegiate CC in Abbeydale Park, Sheffield. Former Yorkshire batsman and England captain Michael Vaughan also learnt his trade at Collegiate and was a source of inspiration for both Root brothers. Both brothers support Sheffield United F.C.

== Cricket career ==
Root made his List A debut for Nottinghamshire in the 2017 Royal London One-Day Cup on 27 April 2017. He once appeared as a substitute fielder for the England cricket team. Opportunities at Nottinghamshire were limited for Root, however he did top the club averages in T20 cricket in the 2017 season, as well as making a crucial century in the final Championship game of the season at Hove, coming in at 55–4 to help force a vital draw.

=== Glamorgan ===
At the end of the 2018 season Root left Nottinghamshire to join Glamorgan on a two-year contract. Root made his County Championship debut for Glamorgan against Northamptonshire in April 2019, scoring 126 in the first innings. In May 2019, Root was suspended from bowling by the England and Wales Cricket Board (ECB) due to a suspect action. On August 23, 2019, Root was cleared to bowl again. In June 2019, Root scored his maiden first-class double hundred in a championship game against Northants, posting 229 in the first innings. Root ended his first season at Glamorgan with 768 runs in the County Championship and 386 runs at an average of 64.33 in the Royal London One Day Cup, making him the club's highest scorer in the competition.

During the shortened 2020 season, Root completed a fifth first-class century, making 118 against Worcestershire.

The 2021 season began with Root facing elder brother Joe in a first-class game for the first time ever as Glamorgan opened their season away to Yorkshire. Fittingly, in the second innings, Root pushed a ball from his brother into the leg side for two to reach his sixth first-class hundred.

Root signed a new one-year contract with Glamorgan in December 2024 and a further one-year extension in January 2026. On 23 September 2026, he announced he would retire from professional cricket at the end of that year's county season.
