= Dore, South Yorkshire =

Village in South Yorkshire, England

Coordinates: 53°19′37″N 1°32′25″W

Dore
- Village and suburb
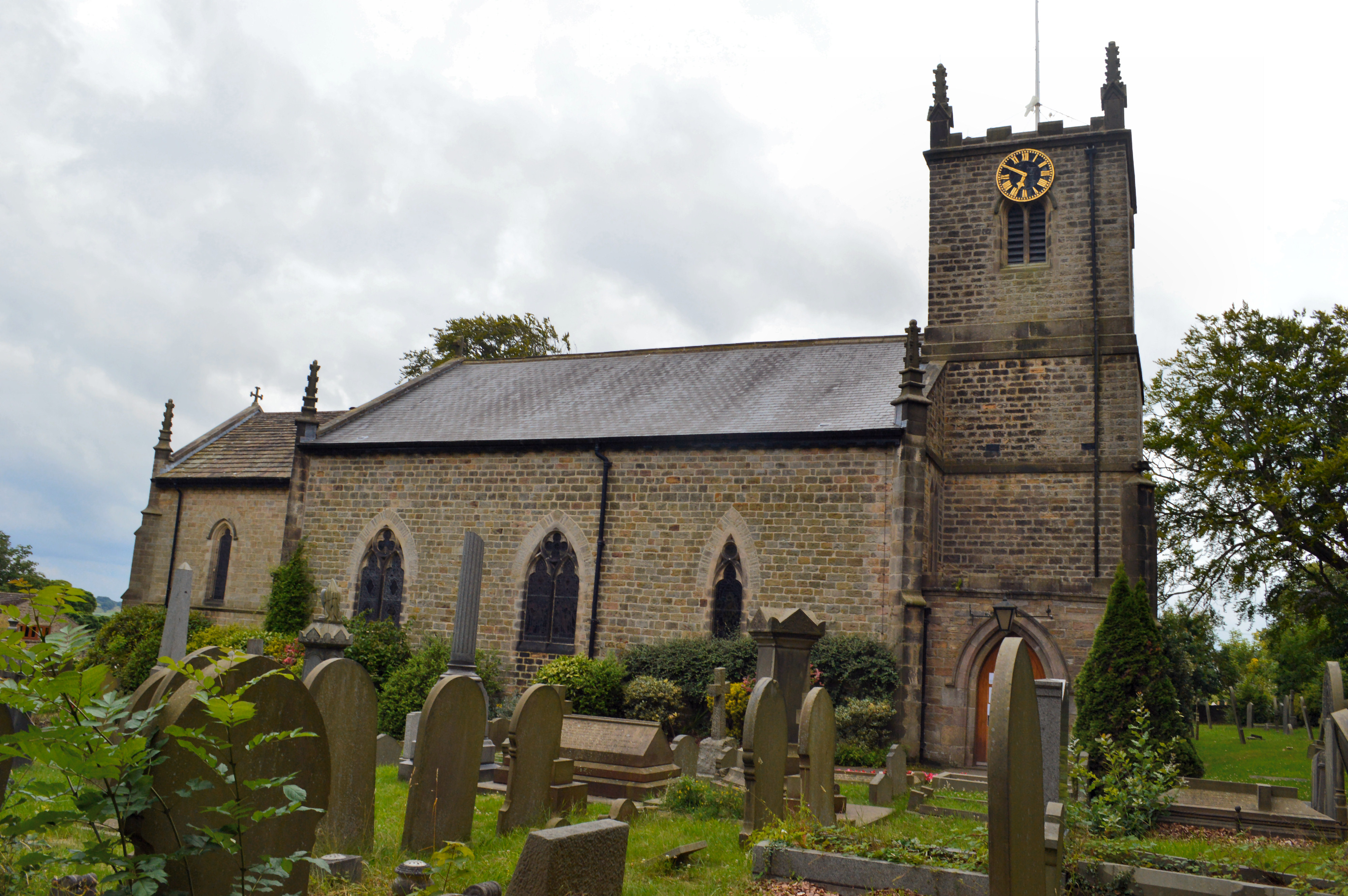
- Christ Church

- Location within South Yorkshire
- Population: 5,496
- OS grid reference: SK311812
- Metropolitan borough: Sheffield
- Metropolitan county: South Yorkshire
- Region: Yorkshire and the Humber
- Country: England
- Sovereign state: United Kingdom
- Post town: SHEFFIELD
- Postcode district: S17
- Dialling code: 0114
- Police: South Yorkshire
- Fire: South Yorkshire
- Ambulance: Yorkshire
- UK Parliament: Sheffield Hallam

Dore is a large village in the Sheffield district, in the county of South Yorkshire, England. The village lies on a hill above the River Sheaf which gave Sheffield its name and, until 1934, was part of Derbyshire but it is now a suburb of the city.

Dore and Totley was the only ward of the city which regularly elected a Conservative councillor; however, as of May 2016, all three councillors were Liberal Democrats. The Member of Parliament for the Sheffield Hallam constituency, of which Dore is part, is Olivia Blake (Labour) who was elected in 2019.

== History ==
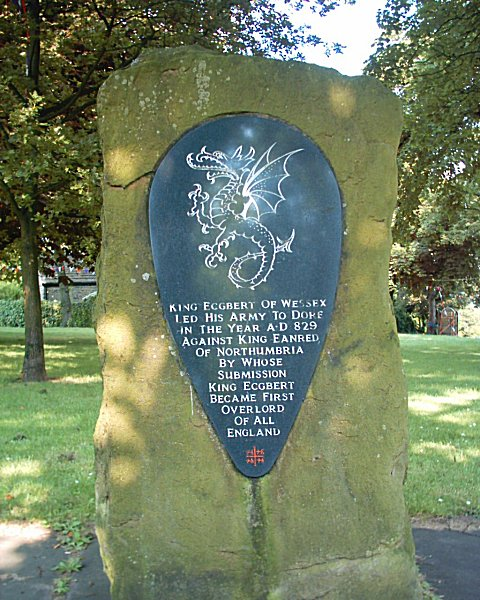
The "Dore Stone", commemorating King Egbert's victory

The name Dore is most likely to derive from one of two possible origins. It could be the same Old English root as door, signifying a 'gateway' or pass between two kingdoms. Alternatively, it could be associated with the Cymric (Welsh) 'dwr' (dur) for water, as is also found in Dour in Fife, Aberdeen and Kent, Dorchester in Dorset, Durra in Cornwall, and Doro in Ireland. This Welsh derivation would refer to the streams that meet at Dore. The Limb Brook, River Sheaf, and Meers Brook marked the boundary between the Anglo-Saxon kingdoms of Deira (later Northumbria) and Mercia.

The Anglo-Saxon Chronicle contains the earliest written record of Dore, recording that in 827 (more likely 829) King Egbert of Wessex led his army to the village to receive the submission of King Eanred of Northumbria, thereby establishing his overlordship over the whole of Anglo-Saxon Britain:

This year was the moon eclipsed, on mid-winter's mass-night; and King Egbert, in the course of the same year, conquered the Mercian kingdom, and all that is south of the Humber, being the eighth king who was sovereign of all the British dominions. Ella, king of the South-Saxons, was the first who possessed so large a territory; the second was Ceawlin, king of the West-Saxons: the third was Ethelbert, King of Kent; the fourth was Redwald, king of the East-Angles; the fifth was Edwin, king of the Northumbrians; the sixth was Oswald, who succeeded him; the seventh was Oswy, the brother of Oswald; the eighth was Egbert, king of the West-Saxons. This same Egbert led an army against the Northumbrians as far as Dore, where they met him, and offered terms of obedience and subjection, on the acceptance of which they returned home.

It can therefore be reasonably argued that Egbert became the first king of all England at Dore. A plaque commemorating the event was erected on the village green in 1968 by the Dore Village Society. The Old School was built in 1821 on the site of a previous school, on the right hand side was the teacher's accommodation. When Dore's new school was opened, the Old School was restored and opened as a community centre. Christ Church is Grade II listed and was built in 1828 and Dore became a separate parish in 1844. Dore remained a small village, having a population of just 500 in the 19th century, until it became part of Sheffield in 1934.

A paper mill was built on Avenue Farm in the 17th century, Joshua Tyzack converted the building into a scythe forge in 1839 and in 1881 built a large house next to the forge as a country retreat, his initials can be seen above the front door. In 1932 Dore's Parish council built a memorial commemorating the deaths of the First World War.

Dore was formerly a township and chapelry in the parish of Dronfield, in 1866 Dore became a separate civil parish, on 1 April 1934 the parish was abolished and merged with Sheffield. In 1931 the parish had a population of 2684. It is now in the unparished area of Sheffield.

== Brinkburn Grange ==
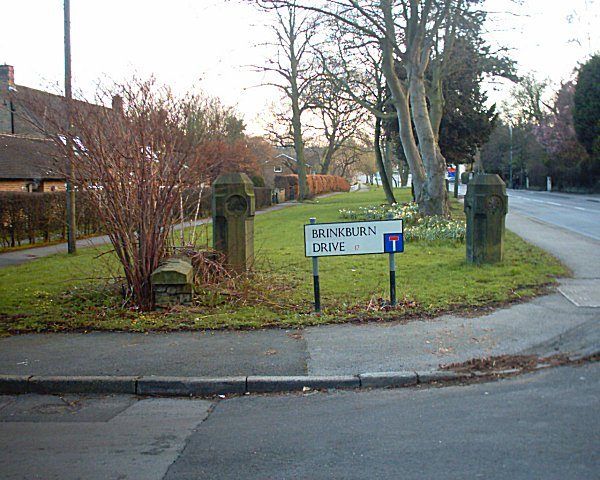
Brinkburn Grange entrance

Brinkburn Grange was built in 1883 by Thomas B. Matthews. The land was part of Bradway Mill and Matthews was director of Turton Brothers & Matthews, a Sheffield steel, file and spring makers. The mill dam was then used as an ornamental lake. The Grange was demolished in 1938.

== Sheffield Clarion Club House ==
Dore Moor was the site chosen for the Sheffield Clarion Club House, often known as the Dore Moor Clarion Club House. This was an independent socialist social centre which continued operating until 1967, by which time the club house was more or less defunct.

== Schools ==
Schools in Dore include Dore Primary School, King Ecgbert School (secondary) and the Rowan Primary Special School. There is also the old school which is used for social events such as brownies.

== Transport ==
The village is served by Dore and Totley railway station on the Hope Valley Line between Sheffield and Manchester, via New Mills Central. Services generally operate hourly in each direction. The railway tunnel between Dore and Totley, under a limb of the Pennines to Grindleford in Derbyshire, is the longest main line railway tunnel in England and is second only in Great Britain to the Severn Tunnel between England and South Wales.

== Sport ==
Abbeydale Park, a former county cricket ground for both Derbyshire and Yorkshire, lies just north of the suburb.

== Residents ==
Notable residents include:

=== Historical ===
- Emlyn Hughes (1947–2004), England footballer and captain, lived in the village.

=== Living ===
- Gary Megson, former footballer and manager of Sheffield Wednesday
- Dave Bassett, former footballer and former manager of Southampton, Watford, Sheffield United and Nottingham Forest
- Chris Waddle, former England international footballer and player with Sheffield Wednesday and Tottenham Hotspur football clubs.
- Bryan Robson, former Sheffield United manager and Manchester United player, owns a penthouse in the village.
- Michael Vaughan, former Yorkshire County Cricket Club cricketer and former captain of the England cricket team, is a resident.
- Joe Root, also of Yorkshire County Cricket Club, a notable batter and England's former cricket captain, was born and raised in Dore.
- Sheffield-born Olympic gold medallist Jessica Ennis-Hill, who attended the King Ecgbert School in Dore, purchased a property in the village in 2012.
- Kell Brook, Sheffield-born former boxing welterweight world champion, lives in Dore, with his partner Ebanie Bridges and their son.
