= Prem Sisodiya =

Welsh cricketer (born 1998)

Personal information
- Full name: Prem Sisodiya
- Born: 21 September 1998 (age 28); Cardiff, Wales
- Batting: Right-handed
- Bowling: Slow left-arm orthodox
- Role: Bowler

Domestic team information
- Years: Team
- 2018–2024: Glamorgan (squad no. 32)
- 2019: Cardiff MCCU
- First-class debut: 20 June 2018 Glamorgan v Derbyshire
- Twenty20 debut: 26 August 2019 Glamorgan v Sussex

Career statistics
Competition	FC	LA	T20
Matches	5	7	41
Runs scored	87	20	64
Batting average	12.42	6.66	10.66
100s/50s	0/0	0/0	0/0
Top score	38	7	23
Balls bowled	821	372	894
Wickets	16	8	40
Bowling average	27.68	41.75	30.57
5 wickets in innings	0	0	0
10 wickets in match	0	0	0
Best bowling	4/79	3/76	3/26
Catches/stumpings	2/–	2/–	9/–
- Source: Cricinfo, 28 September 2024

Prem Sisodiya (born 21 September 1998) is a retired Welsh cricketer. He made his first-class debut for Glamorgan in the 2018 County Championship on 20 June 2018. Prior to his first-class debut, he was part of England's squad for the 2018 Under-19 Cricket World Cup. He made his Twenty20 debut on 26 August 2019, for Glamorgan in the 2019 t20 Blast. Sisodiya announced his retirement from professional cricket in September 2024.
