= Anuj Dal =

English cricketer (born 1996)

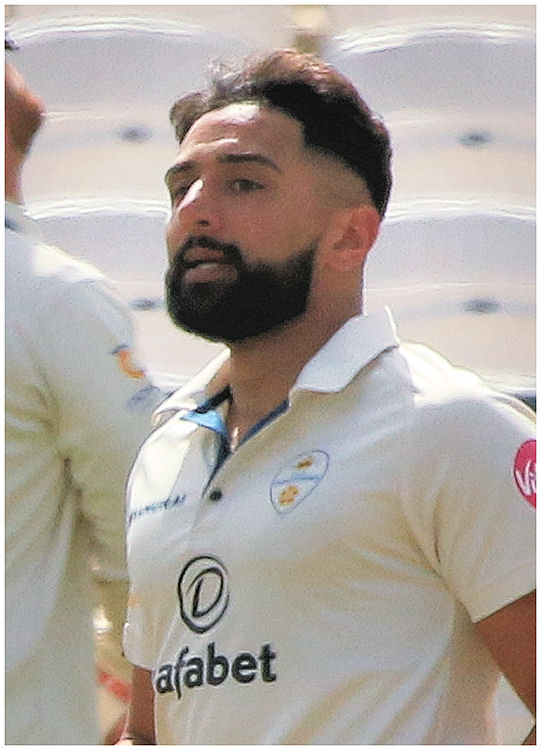
- Dal in 2024

Personal information
- Full name: Anuj Kailash Dal
- Born: 8 July 1996 (age 30); Newcastle-under-Lyme, Staffordshire, England
- Batting: Right-handed
- Bowling: Right-arm medium
- Role: All-rounder

Domestic team information
- Years: Team
- 2018–2026: Derbyshire (squad no. 65)
- First-class debut: 19 August 2018 Derbyshire v Sussex
- List A debut: 26 April 2019 Derbyshire v Yorkshire

Career statistics
Competition	FC	LA	T20
Matches	76	40	26
Runs scored	2,8022	725	201
Batting average	31.01	25.89	13.40
100s/50s	5/13	2/1	0/0
Top score	146*	115	35
Balls bowled	7,399	914	6
Wickets	115	13	0
Bowling average	33.27	59.30	–
5 wickets in innings	4	0	–
10 wickets in match	0	0	–
Best bowling	6/69	3/33	–
Catches/stumpings	40/1	15/–	11/–
- Source: Cricinfo, 14 September 2026

Anuj Kailash Dal (born 8 July 1996) is an English former professional cricketer. He made his Twenty20 debut for Derbyshire in the 2018 t20 Blast on 8 July 2018. He made his List A debut on 26 April 2019 for Derbyshire in the 2019 Royal London One-Day Cup. In September 2021, in the 2021 County Championship, Dal scored his maiden century in first-class cricket. On 14 September 2026, Dal announced his immediate retirement from professional cricket in order to pursue a full-time career in financial services.
