= Jamie McIlroy =

English cricketer (born 1994)

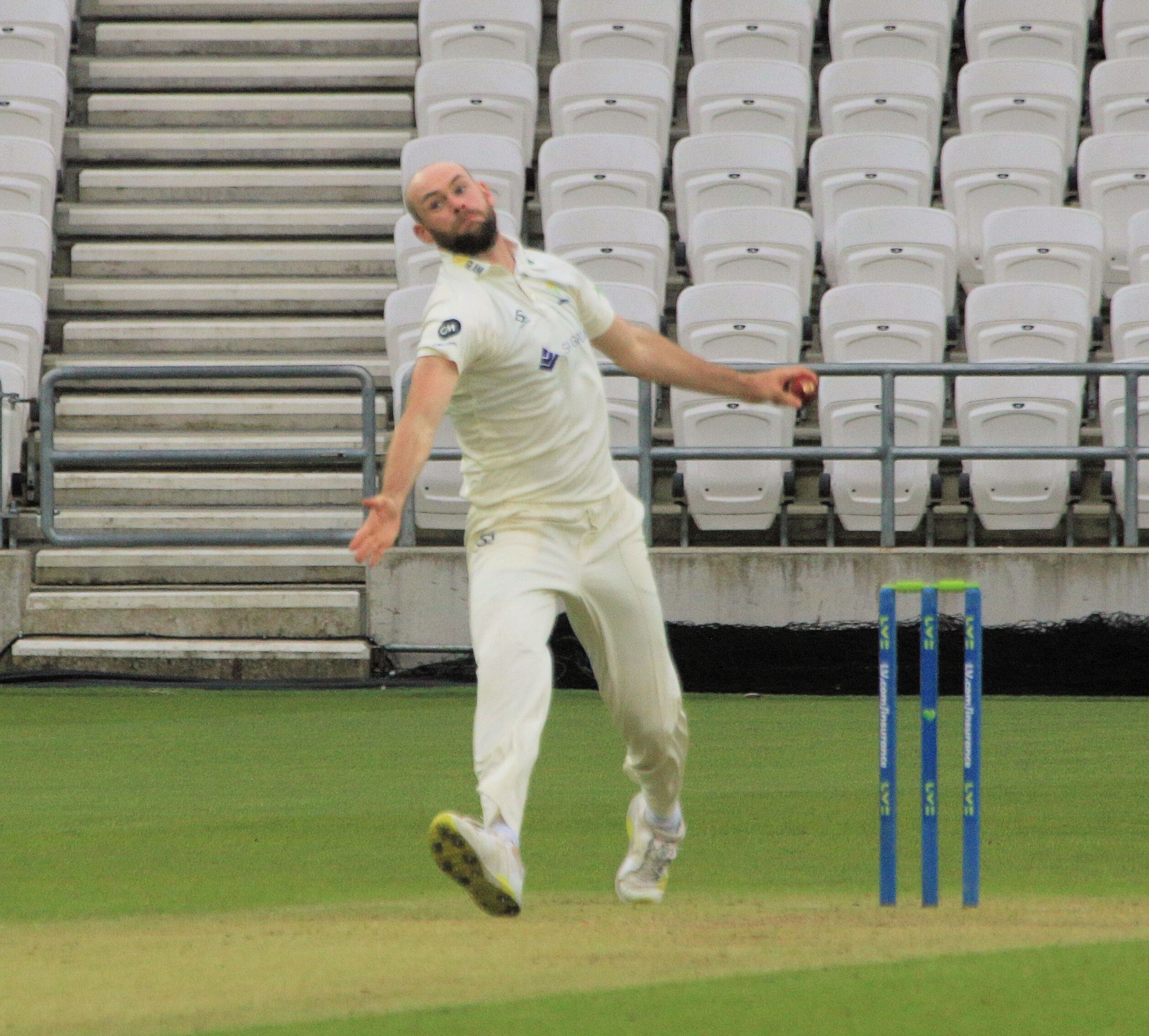
- McIlroy in 2023

Personal information
- Full name: Jamie Peter McIlroy
- Born: 19 June 1994 (age 32); Hereford, Herefordshire, England
- Batting: Right-handed
- Bowling: Left-arm fast-medium

Domestic team information
- Years: Team
- 2019–present: Glamorgan (squad no. 35)

Career statistics
Competition	FC	LA	T20
Matches	19	20	30
Runs scored	101	44	11
Batting average	9.18	22.00	2.75
100s/50s	0/0	0/0	0/0
Top score	30*	13	7*
Balls bowled	2,717	942	632
Wickets	30	23	35
Bowling average	45.13	29.56	28.68
5 wickets in innings	1	0	0
10 wickets in match	0	0	0
Best bowling	5/34	3/33	4/36
Catches/stumpings	3/–	5/–	8/–
- Source: Cricinfo, 27 September 2026

Jamie Peter McIlroy (born 19 June 1994) is an English professional cricketer who plays for Glamorgan. McIlroy is a right-handed batsman and left-arm fast-medium bowler.

From Builth Wells, McIlroy was playing for Herefordshire in the Minor Counties Cricket Championship before signing a professional contract with Glamorgan in 2019. He signed an extension in September 2020 after injury ruled him out of the entire 2020 summer season that was truncated severely by the COVID-19 pandemic.

He made his first-class debut on 8 April 2021, the opening day of the 2021 County Championship as Glamorgan faced Yorkshire at Headingley. He made his Twenty20 debut on 2 July 2022, for Glamorgan in the 2022 T20 Blast.

McIlroy signed a two-year contract extension with Glamorgan in September 2024.
