= Tom Bevan (cricketer) =

Welsh cricketer

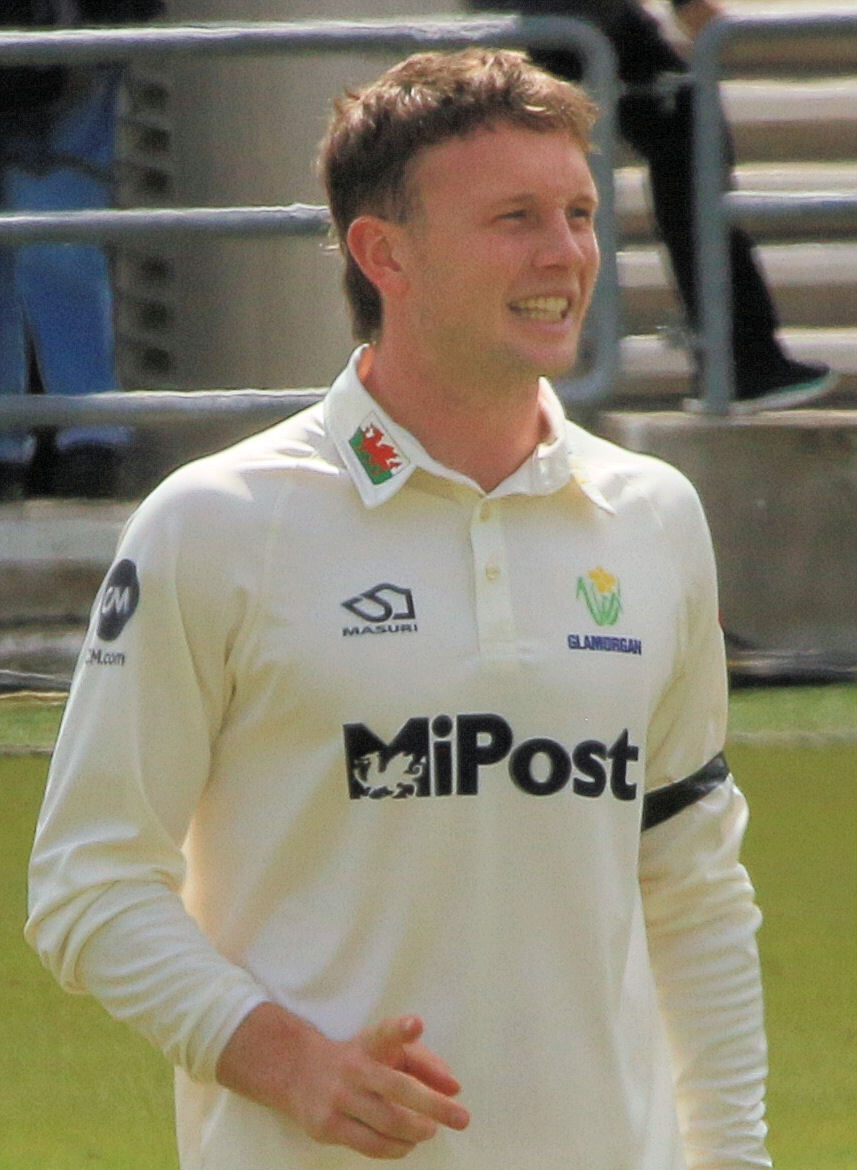
- Bevan in 2024

Personal information
- Full name: Thomas Rhys Bevan
- Born: 9 September 1999 (age 27); Cardiff, Wales
- Batting: Right-handed
- Bowling: Right-arm off break
- Role: Batter

Domestic team information
- Years: Team
- 2022–2025: Glamorgan (squad no. 13)
- FC debut: 20 September 2022 Glamorgan v Derbyshire
- LA debut: 14 August 2022 Glamorgan v Essex

Career statistics
Competition	FC	LA	T20
Matches	4	16	12
Runs scored	100	278	127
Batting average	16.66	19.85	12.70
100s/50s	0/0	1/0	0/0
Top score	48	134	34
Balls bowled	72	102	24
Wickets	0	0	1
Bowling average	–	–	56.00
5 wickets in innings	–	–	0
10 wickets in match	–	–	0
Best bowling	–	–	1/15
Catches/stumpings	4/–	8/–	6/–
- Source: ESPNcricinfo, 25 May 2025

Thomas Rhys Bevan (born 9 September 1999) is a Welsh cricketer. Born in Cardiff, he is a right-handed batter and bowls part-time right arm off spin.

Bevan was educated at Millfield School. After regular appearances for Glamorgan's 2nd XI and the Wales National County, he made his debut for the Glamorgan 1st XI in a T20 Blast game away to Essex on 2 July 2022; opening the batting with Sam Northeast, he made just 4 runs before he was caught out. He played again the next day in an away match against Kent, making 21 runs before he was trapped lbw. He made his List A debut in the Royal London One-Day Cup on 14 August 2022, again away to Essex at Chelmsford; batting at number 5, he made 14 runs.

In October 2022, Bevan received the John Derrick Award for the best young cricketer at Glamorgan County Cricket Club. Bevan was released by Glamorgan at the end of the 2025 season after four years with the club.
