= Paul Baldwin =

English cricket umpire

Personal information
- Full name: Paul Kerr Baldwin
- Born: 18 July 1973 (age 53); Epsom, Surrey, England
- Role: Umpire

Umpiring information
- ODIs umpired: 18 (2006–2009)
- T20Is umpired: 9 (2008–2010)
- WODIs umpired: 3 (2011–2012)
- WT20Is umpired: 3 (2011–2021)
- FC umpired: 153 (2005–present)
- LA umpired: 69 (2006–present)
- T20 umpired: 126 (2006–present)
- Source: ESPNcricinfo, 05 October 2026

Paul Kerr Baldwin (born 18 July 1973) is an English cricket umpire. He was born in Epsom in Surrey.

Baldwin started umpiring in 2000 and was appointed to the ICC Associates and Affiliates International Umpires Panel in 2005. He made his ODI umpiring debut on 5 August 2006, in a match between Scotland and Ireland. From 2006 to 2010, Baldwin officiated in 18 ODIs and 9 International T20s. He moved back to England for the 2009 season where his performances throughout the season earned him a place on the ECB's list of reserve first-class umpires.

== See also ==
- List of One Day International cricket umpires
- List of Twenty20 International cricket umpires
