= List of Cardiff MCCU players =

Cardiff South Wales MCC University, formerly Cardiff University Centre of Cricketing Excellence, was formed in 2001, and first appeared in first-class cricket in 2012. MCC funding came to an end in July 2020, although no matches were played in the 2020 season due to the restrictions put in place during the Coronavirus outbreak. In December 2019 the ECB announced that matches with MCCU teams would lose their first-class status as of the 2021 season. The players in this list have all played at least one first-class match for Cardiff MCCU.

Players are listed in order of appearance, where players made their debut in the same match, they are ordered by batting order.

== Key ==
General

- † – Wicket-keeper
- First – Year of First-class debut for Cardiff MCCU
- Last – Year of latest First-class match for Cardiff MCCU
- Mat – Number of First-class appearances for Cardiff MCCU

Batting

- Runs – Runs scored in career
- HS – Highest score
- Avg – Runs scored per dismissal
- * – Batsman remained not out

Bowling

- Balls – Balls bowled in career
- Wkt – Wickets taken in career
- BBI – Best bowling in an innings
- Ave – Average runs per wicket

Fielding

- Ca – Catches taken
- St – Stumpings effected
All statistics correct as of the end of the English 2019 cricket season.

== List of players ==
Cardiff MCC University First-class players
No.	Name	Nationality	First	Last	Mat	Runs	HS	Avg	Balls	Wkt	BBI	Ave	Ca	St	Ref(s)
No.	Name	Nationality	First	Last	Mat	Batting			Bowling				Fielding		Ref(s)
1	William Jones	England	2012	2012	2	77	34	19.25	42	0	–	–	3	0	
2	Zac Elkin †	South Africa	2012	2013	4	197	138	28.14	0	–	–	–	3	0	
3	Hamza Siddique	England	2012	2013	3	53	37	13.25	0	–	–	–	2	0	
4	Andrew Balbirnie ‡	Ireland	2012	2013	4	40	19	8.00	60	0	–	–	2	0	
5	Uzair Qureshi	England	2012	2014	6	134	47	16.75	0	–	–	–	0	0	
6	Sam Davies	Wales	2012	2013	3	91	42	22.75	0	–	–	–	3	0	
7	Tom Friend	England	2012	2012	2	85	48	28.33	228	2	2/96	93.50	2	0	
8	Andrew Salter	Wales	2012	2014	5	77	21	19.25	734	7	3/134	62.28	1	0	
9	Phil Harris	England	2012	2013	4	34	20	17.00	420	5	2/22	49.00	0	0	
10	Jack Leach	England	2012	2012	1	–	–	–	246	0	–	–	0	0	
11	Matt Hobden	England	2012	2013	4	33	18	33.00	633	13	5/62	33.30	0	0	
12	Dan Bendon	England	2012	2012	1	5	5	2.50	36	1	1/33	33.00	0	0	
13	Adam Miles ‡†	England	2012	2013	3	45	29*	22.50	0	–	–	–	2	0	
14	Fabian Cowdrey	England	2013	2013	2	100	62	50.00	96	0	–	–	0	0	
15	Jonathan Denning	Wales	2013	2013	2	28	22*	–	336	3	2/46	52.00	1	0	
16	Scott Phillips	Wales	2013	2013	1	7	7	7.00	138	2	2/45	47.50	0	0	
17	Jake George ‡	England	2014	2015	4	43	14	7.16	0	–	–	–	1	0	
18	Jake Libby	England	2014	2014	2	81	65	40.50	155	1	1/18	104.00	0	0	
19	Bradley Scriven ‡	England	2014	2016	5	172	67*	34.40	0	–	–	–	0	0	
20	Alex Thomson ‡	England	2014	2016	4	43	25	14.33	457	9	6/138	36.11	0	0	
21	Sean Griffiths	Wales	2014	2016	6	186	65	31.00	750	3	2/63	176.33	1	0	
22	Sam Bracey †	England	2014	2015	3	22	20	11.00	0	–	–	–	4	0	
23	Andrew Westphal	England	2014	2016	6	39	28*	19.50	684	10	3/45	43.70	2	0	
24	Ryan Adams	England	2014	2014	1	0	0*	–	120	0	–	–	2	0	
25	Harry Powell	Wales	2014	2014	2	16	16*	–	168	1	1/26	147.00	0	0	
26	Thomas Hamilton	England	2014	2014	1	38	38	38.00	24	0	–	–	0	0	
27	Owen Morgan	Wales	2014	2014	1	28	28*	–	150	2	1/19	43.50	0	0	
28	Jeremy Lawlor	Wales	2015	2017	5	261	81	65.25	240	3	1/26	47.66	3	0	
29	Neil Brand ‡	South Africa	2015	2017	5	154	46	30.80	233	4	3/7	41.00	2	0	
30	Tim Rouse	England	2015	2017	5	80	22	16.00	222	5	2/31	36.80	2	0	
31	Matthew Norris	South Africa	2015	2017	4	104	32	17.33	0	–	–	–	2	0	
32	Jack Murphy	Wales	2015	2015	2	39	22	13.00	240	2	2/90	67.50	1	0	
33	Dan Lewis-Williams	England	2015	2015	1	0	0	0.00	162	1	1/98	98.00	0	0	
34	Kieran Bull	Wales	2015	2015	2	0	0*	0.00	346	2	1/63	105.50	1	0	
35	Tom Cullen †	Australia	2015	2017	4	70	26	14.00	0	–	–	–	5	0	
36	Kamau Leverock	Bermuda	2015	2017	4	69	25	17.25	408	2	1/56	142.00	1	0	
37	Cameron Herring †	Wales	2016	2018	3	23	14*	11.50	0	–	–	–	5	0	
38	Alex Milton ‡†	England	2016	2018	3	17	12	8.50	0	–	–	–	0	0	
39	Greg Holmes	Wales	2016	2016	2	0	0	0.00	18	0	–	–	1	0	
40	James Turpin	England	2016	2018	4	5	5	5.00	386	6	2/44	46.83	1	0	
41	Richard Edwards	Wales	2016	2016	1	–	–	–	78	0	–	–	0	0	
42	Connor Brown	Wales	2017	2017	2	71	33	23.66	0	–	–	–	0	0	
43	Jack Scriven	England	2017	2017	2	18	16	18.00	0	–	–	–	1	0	
44	Aron Nijjar	England	2017	2017	2	0	0	0.00	198	3	1/37	48.66	0	0	
45	Andrew Brewster (Note: Brewster was born at York in 1997 and educated at Tadcaster Grammar School. He played Second XI cricket for a number of teams during 2017 and 2018 and has since played for MCC in club matches.)	England	2017	2018	4	8	7	8.00	510	3	2/87	117.66	0	0	
46	Oliver Pike	Wales	2017	2018	3	0	0*	–	320	5	3/82	44.00	0	0	
47	David O'Sullivan	Australia	2017	2017	1	2	2	2.00	156	4	3/29	23.00	0	0	
48	Joseph Ludlow	England	2018	2019	4	28	19	7.00	0	–	–	–	6	0	
49	Harry Allen	England	2018	2018	2	4	4	4.00	102	0	–	–	0	0	
50	Alexander Woodland ‡	England	2018	2019	3	12	11	4.00	120	0	–	–	2	0	
51	Lorenzo Machado †	South Africa	2018	2019	4	32	19	8.00	0	–	–	–	1	1	
52	Sam Pearce ‡	Wales	2018	2019	4	55	35	13.75	196	1	1/74	164.00	0	0	
53	Brad Evans	Zimbabwe	2018	2019	4	3	3*	1.00	552	8	4/53	43.62	0	0	
54	Shailen Assani	England	2018	2018	1	–	–	–	48	0	–	–	1	0	
55	Steven Reingold	South Africa	2019	2019	2	29	22	9.66	330	3	2/64	85.33	0	0	
56	Yuvraj Odedra	England	2019	2019	1	4	4	2.00	126	2	1/41	47.50	0	0	
57	Oskar Kolk	England	2019	2019	2	42	33	14.00	0	–	–	–	2	0	
58	Dan Douthwaite	England	2019	2019	2	145	100*	72.50	348	4	2/85	72.50	0	0	
59	Prem Sisodiya	Wales	2019	2019	2	42	33	14.00	351	8	4/79	27.25	1	0	
60	Yodhin Punja	UAE	2019	2019	1	0	0*	—	45	0	–	–	0	0	
61	Kiran Carlson	Wales	2019	2019	1	0	0	0.00	72	0	–	–	2	0	
62	Matthew Foster	Ireland	2019	2019	1	6	6	6.00	60	1	1/59	59.00	0	0	
63	Jack Gibbs	England	2019	2019	1	0	0	0.00	147	2	2/54	58.00	0	0	
