= 2018 Marylebone Cricket Club University Matches =

Cricket matches

- Dates: 1 April 2018 – 15 April 2018
- Administrator: England and Wales Cricket Board
- Cricket format: First-class

The 2018 Marylebone Cricket Club University Matches were a series of cricket matches played between the eighteen County Championship teams and the six Marylebone Cricket Club University teams (MCCU) of England and Wales. The first two rounds of fixtures were classed as first-class matches. Each county side were scheduled to play one fixture against a MCCU side ahead of the start of the 2018 County Championship. All the fixtures in the competition were affected by bad weather, with matches either ending in a draw, due to play not being possible because of rain, or in some cases, abandoned with no play possible across all three days.

== Fixtures ==
=== Round 1 ===
1–3 April 2018
Scorecard

Cambridge MCCU	v	Nottinghamshire

Match abandoned
FP Fenner's Ground, Cambridge

- No toss.
- No play was possible due to a wet outfield.

1–3 April 2018
Scorecard

Gloucestershire	v	Cardiff MCCU
359/5d (80 overs); Benny Howell 89 (113); Brad Evans 4/53 (17 overs)		101 (46.4 overs); Sam Pearce 35 (72); Matt Taylor 5/15 (14 overs)
140/2 (35 overs); George Hankins 54* (90); Oliver Pike 1/35 (8 overs)

Match drawn
County Ground, Bristol
Umpires: Jeff Evans and Ian Blackwell

- Cardiff MCCU won the toss and elected to field.
- No play was possible on day 2 due to a wet outfield.
- Brad Evans, Joseph Ludlow, Harry Allen, Alexander Woodland, Lorenzo Machado and Sam Pearce (Cardiff MCCU) all made their first-class debuts.

1–3 April 2018
Scorecard

Kent	v	Oxford MCCU
100/3 (33 overs); Zak Crawley 42 (69); William Robertson 1/7 (3 overs)

Match drawn
St Lawrence Ground, Canterbury
Umpires: Ben Debenham and Martin Saggers

- Oxford MCCU won the toss and elected to field.
- No play was possible on day 2 due to a wet outfield.
- Harry Adair, James Seward, William Robertson and Steven Green (Oxford MCCU) all made their first-class debuts.

1–3 April 2018
Scorecard

Sussex	v	Loughborough MCCU
337/7d (103 overs); Ben Brown 119* (221); William Pereira 2/55 (19 overs)		99 (30.4 overs); Andrew Rishton 32* (49); Ollie Robinson 7/23 (9.4 overs)
		71/2 (34.4 overs) (f/o); Sam Evans 33* (95); Will Beer 1/9 (8 overs)

Match drawn
County Cricket Ground, Hove
Umpires: Mike Burns and Richard White

- Sussex won the toss and elected to bat.
- No play was possible on day 2 due to rain.
- Oliver Soames, Nick Hammond, Andrew Rishton, Chris Sanders, Will Rollings and William Pereira (Loughborough MCCU) all made their first-class debuts.

1–3 April 2018
Scorecard

Warwickshire	v	Durham MCCU
299/4d (78 overs); Jonathan Trott 111* (206); Joe Cooke 1/26 (11 overs)		35/1 (13 overs); Charlie Macdonell 22* (38); Keith Barker 1/10 (5 overs)

Match drawn
Edgbaston Cricket Ground, Birmingham
Umpires: Graham Lloyd and Russell Warren

- Durham MCCU won the toss and elected to field.
- No play was possible on day 2 due to rain.
- Matthew Plater, Freddie Ruffell, Vicram Sohal, James Sookias and Mungo Russell (Durham MCCU) all made their first-class debuts.

1–3 April 2018
Scorecard

Worcestershire	v	Leeds/Bradford MCCU

Match abandoned
Flagge Meadow, Worcester

- No toss.
- No play was possible due to a wet outfield.

=== Round 2 ===
7–9 April 2018
Scorecard

Essex	v	Cambridge MCCU
283/4 (66.3 overs); Nick Browne 100 (122); Callum Guest 1/28 (5 overs)

Match drawn
FP Fenner's Ground, Cambridge
Umpires: David Millns and Paul Pollard

- Essex won the toss and elected to bat.
- No play was possible on days 2 and 3 due to rain and a wet outfield.
- Ben Seabrook, Jack Keeping, Sam Handley, John Bowers, Jordan Bulpitt (Cambridge MCCU) and Jack Plom (Essex) all made their first-class debuts.

7–9 April 2018
Scorecard

Hampshire	v	Cardiff MCCU
417/4 (83 overs); Jimmy Adams 182* (242); James Turpin 1/49 (8 overs)

Match drawn
Rose Bowl, Southampton
Umpires: Ben Debenham and Billy Taylor

- Cardiff MCCU won the toss and elected to field.
- No play was possible on days 2 and 3 due to rain and a wet outfield.
- Shailen Assani (Cardiff MCCU) made his first-class debut.

7–9 April 2018
Scorecard

Loughborough MCCU	v	Lancashire
220 (89.4 overs); Chris Sanders 56 (130); Saqib Mahmood 3/53 (16 overs)		369/4 (102 overs); Steven Croft 148* (225); Will Rollings 2/78 (21 overs)

Match drawn
Haslegrave Ground, Loughborough
Umpires: Tim Robinson and James Middlebrook

- Lancashire won the toss and elected to field.

7–9 April 2018
Scorecard

Middlesex	v	Durham MCCU
367/4 (108 overs); Sam Robson 135 (263); Joe Cooke 1/35 (15 overs)

Match drawn
Merchant Taylors' School Ground, Northwood
Umpires: Neil Bainton and Chris Watts

- Middlesex won the toss and elected to bat.
- No play was possible on days 2 and 3 due to rain and a wet outfield.
- Jhathavedh Subramanyan, Charlie Nicholls and EWF Fenwick (Durham MCCU) all made their first-class debuts.

7–9 April 2018
Scorecard

Oxford MCCU	v	Northamptonshire

Match abandoned
The Parks, Oxford

- No toss.
- No play was possible due to a wet outfield.

7–9 April 2018
Scorecard

Yorkshire	v	Leeds/Bradford MCCU

Match abandoned
Headingley, Leeds

- No toss.
- No play was possible due to a wet outfield.

=== Round 3 ===
13–15 April 2018
Scorecard

Durham MCCU	v	Durham
194/3d (50 overs); Matthew Plater 76 (111); Paul Collingwood 1/10 (3 overs)		165/3 (47 overs); Will Smith 41 (52); Joe Cooke 1/31 (6.1 overs)

Match drawn
Riverside Ground, Chester-le-Street
Umpires: Michael Gough and Ian Ramage

- Durham MCCU won the toss and elected to bat.
- No play was possible on days 1 and 2 due to a wet outfield.

13–15 April 2018
Scorecard

Cardiff MCCU	v	Glamorgan
249 (91 overs); James Turpin 57* (112); Lukas Carey 4/39 (18 overs)		217/5d (68 overs); Kiran Carlson 69* (164); Andrew Brewster 3/46 (17 overs)
56/2 (29 overs); Alex Milton 28* (79); Marchant de Lange 2/9 (5 overs)

Match drawn
Sophia Gardens, Cardiff
Umpires: Alex Wharf and Tom Lungley

- Glamorgan won the toss and elected to field.

13–15 April 2018
Scorecard

Leeds/Bradford MCCU	v	Derbyshire

Match abandoned
Weetwood Playing Fields, Leeds

- No toss.
- No play was possible due to a wet outfield.

13–15 April 2018
Scorecard

Leicestershire	v	Loughborough MCCU
277/6d (63.4 overs); Mark Cosgrove 91 (106); Chris Sanders 3/82 (14 overs)		155 (62.5 overs); Hassan Azad 48 (144); Gavin Griffiths 4/44 (14 overs)
3/0 (0.2 overs); Michael Carberry 3* (2)

Match drawn
Grace Road, Leicester
Umpires: Nick Cook and Russell Warren

- Loughborough MCCU won the toss and elected to field.
- No play was possible on day 1 due to a wet outfield.

13–15 April 2018
Scorecard

Somerset	v	Oxford MCCU

Match abandoned
Taunton Vale Sports Club Ground, Taunton

- No toss.
- No play was possible to a wet outfield.

13–15 April 2018
Scorecard

Surrey	v	Cambridge MCCU
466/9d (97 overs); Scott Borthwick 108 (142); Sam Handley 4/105 (22 overs)		215 (71.5 overs); Drew Brierley 52* (116); Rikki Clarke 3/40 (12.5 overs)
119/1d (33 overs); Ollie Pope 68* (96); Jordan Bulpitt 1/30 (9 overs)		106/6 (34 overs); Callum Guest 32 (62); Jade Dernbach 3/22 (8 overs)

Match drawn
The Oval, London
Umpires: Rob Bailey and Richard White

- Surrey won the toss and elected to bat.
