= List of Somerset County Cricket Club grounds =

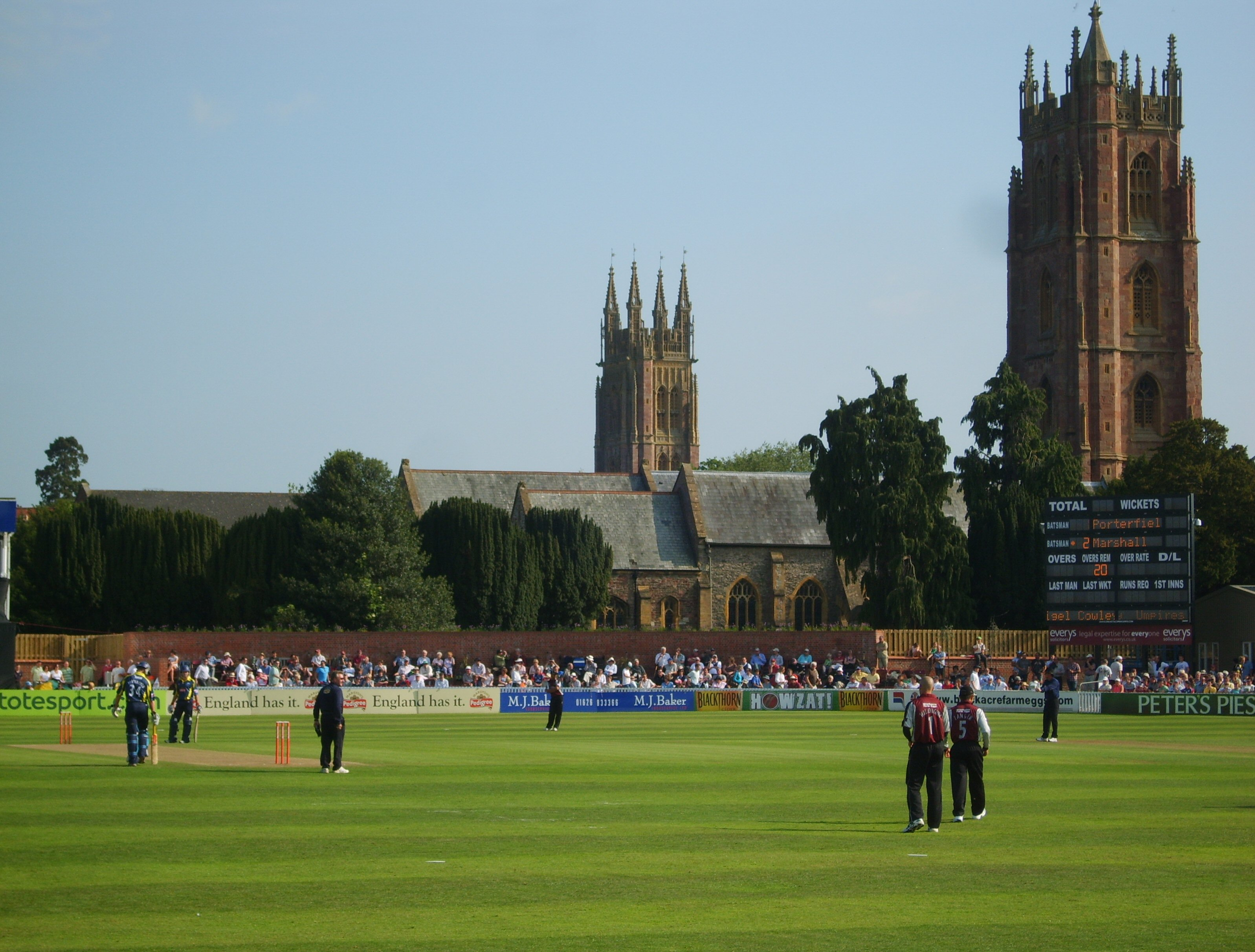
The County Ground, Taunton is the headquarters of Somerset County Cricket Club, and has hosted the majority of their matches.

Somerset County Cricket Club is one of the 18 member clubs of the English County Championship, representing the historic county of Somerset. The club was established in August 1875 and has played first-class cricket since 1882, List A cricket since 1963, and Twenty20 cricket since 2003. (Note: First-class cricket matches are designed to be contested over multiple days, with each team permitted two innings with no limit to the number of overs in an innings. List A matches are intended to be completed in a single day and restrict each team to a single innings of between 40 and 60 overs, depending on the specific competition. Twenty20 matches restrict each team to a single innings of 20 overs.) Unlike most professional sports, in which a team usually has a single fixed home ground, county cricket clubs have traditionally used different grounds in various towns and cities within the county for home matches, although the use of minor "out grounds" has diminished since the 1980s. Somerset have played first class, List A, or Twenty20 matches at eighteen different grounds.

Somerset's first home first-class match was against Hampshire in 1882 at the County Ground, Taunton. This ground is the headquarters of the county club, and has hosted more Somerset matches than any other ground. It was originally known as the Taunton Athletic Ground, and featured a cycling/running track around the outside of the playing area which was later removed. Prior to the cessation of cricket during the First World War, Somerset only played at three other grounds; two in Bath, and Clarence Park in Weston-super-Mare. The Recreation Ground in Bath, the home ground of Bath Rugby, has been a regular setting for Somerset, hosting over 300 county matches. It is also Somerset's only venue other than the County Ground to have hosted a Twenty20 match. Clarence Park also frequently hosted Somerset matches until 1996, and has featured over 200 Somerset games. The next most frequently used ground is Morlands Athletic Ground in Glastonbury, where Somerset played 24 times between 1952 and 1978.

After the First World War, Somerset began playing in a wider variety of locations around the county, including three different grounds in Yeovil, and also hosted five matches at the Recreation Ground in Torquay, despite that being in Devon. They played in three different grounds in Bristol, which has been considered an independent county since 1373, though it was part of the county of Avon from 1974 until 1996, and where Gloucestershire County Cricket Club have their headquarters. After 1979, Somerset only played at the County Ground, the Recreation Ground and Clarence Park until 2012, when they faced Cardiff MCC University at Taunton Vale, their first new ground in 37 years. Somerset have not played a county match outside of Taunton since 2011, when they faced Essex in a Twenty20 match in Bath.

== Grounds ==
Below is a complete list of grounds used by Somerset County Cricket Club for first-class, List A and Twenty20 matches. Statistics are complete through to the end of the 2026 season. Only matches played by Somerset at the grounds are recorded in the table. Matches abandoned without any play occurring are not included.

Name	Location	First-class			List A			Twenty20			Refs
Name	Location	First	Last	Matches	First	Last	Matches	First	Last	Matches	Refs
County Ground	Taunton	8 August 1882 v Hampshire	24 September 2026 v Surrey	930	27 May 1964 v Nottinghamshire	11 August 2026 v Lancashire	410	13 June 2003 v Warwickshire	12 July 2026 v Worcestershire	138	(Note: The County Ground has also hosted two first-class matches, one between East Africa and Sri Lanka and one between India A and West Indies A, six international one-day matches, four "A" international one-day matches, and one international Twenty20 match. Worcestershire also used the ground for one List A match in late 2007, when their main ground was flooded.)
Lansdown CC Ground, Combe Park	Bath	18 August 1884 v Hampshire	18 August 1884 v Hampshire	1	–	–	0	–	–	0	(Note: At Combe Park, Somerset most recently played in 1966; a one-day (not List A) match against International Cavaliers.)
Recreation Ground	Bath	19 July 1897 v Gentlemen of Philadelphia	14 June 2006 v Surrey	255	4 May 1969 v Kent	23 May 2010 v Worcestershire	56	4 July 2011 v Essex	4 July 2011 v Essex	1	
Clarence Park	Weston-super-Mare	27 August 1914 v Yorkshire	21 August 1996 v Durham	191	20 June 1971 v Yorkshire	25 August 1996 v Durham	23	–	–	0	
Knowle CC Ground	Bristol	9 June 1926 v Hampshire	18 August 1928 v Essex	3	–	–	0	–	–	0	
Agricultural Showgrounds	Frome	25 June 1932 v Northamptonshire	6 May 1961 v Hampshire	18	28 June 1970 v Leicestershire	28 June 1970 v Leicestershire	1	–	–	0	
Downside School	Stratton-on-the-Fosse	23 June 1934 v Glamorgan	23 June 1934 v Glamorgan	1	–	–	0	–	–	0	
Rowdens Road	Wells	17 July 1935 v Worcestershire	25 July 1951 v Warwickshire	11	–	–	0	–	–	0	
West Hendford	Yeovil	17 August 1935 v Surrey	15 July 1939 v Lancashire	5	–	–	0	–	–	0	
Johnson Park	Yeovil	19 May 1951 v Nottinghamshire	29 July 1967 v Essex	12	27 July 1969 v Essex	7 June 1970 v Warwickshire	2	–	–	0	
Morlands Athletic Ground	Glastonbury	26 July 1952 v Northamptonshire	14 July 1973 v Nottinghamshire	18	13 July 1969 v Nottinghamshire	16 July 1978 v Leicestershire	6	–	–	0	
Imperial Athletic Ground	Bristol	21 August 1957 v Sussex	7 May 1966 v Hampshire	9	6 June 1971 v Gloucestershire	10 June 1979 v Gloucestershire	8	–	–	0	
Millfield School	Street	29 July 1961 v Warwickshire	29 July 1961 v Warwickshire	1	10 May 1975 v Gloucestershire	3 July 1977 v Hampshire	2	–	–	0	(Note: At Millfield, Somerset most recently played in 2002; a three-day (not first-class) match against Cardiff UCCE.)
Devonshire Park	Weston-super-Mare	–	–	0	27 April 1969 v Leicestershire	9 August 1970 v Kent	2	–	–	0	
Ironmould Lane	Bristol	–	–	0	15 June 1969 v Surrey	21 June 1970 v Derbyshire	2	–	–	0	
Recreation Ground	Torquay, Devon	–	–	0	24 August 1969 v Sussex	13 July 1975 v Northamptonshire	5	–	–	0	(Note: The Recreation Ground has also been used as a first-class venue for matches between the South and the North of England, an England XI and the Commonwealth XI, and the Minor Counties against touring opposition. Somerset also played one further match at the Recreation Ground, Torquay as the away team against Minor Counties in 1974, and Devon have played five List A matches there.)
Westlands Sports Ground	Yeovil	–	–	0	23 May 1971 v Lancashire	21 May 1978 v Surrey	8	–	–	0	
Taunton Vale	Taunton	31 March 2012 v Cardiff MCCU	2 April 2015 v Durham MCCU	2	–	–	0	–	–	0	(Note: At Taunton Vale, Somerset have played several matches against MCC Universities teams since 2005 (with first-class matches in 2012 and 2015).)

== Bibliography ==
- Powell, William A. (2003). The Official ECB Guide to Cricket Grounds. Stroud, Gloucestershire: Sutton Publishing. ISBN 0-7509-3084-5.
