= Berkshire County Cricket Club =

Minor counties cricket club in England

Personnel
- Captain: Jonny Connell
- Coach: Bjorn Mordt

Team information
- Founded: 1895
- Home ground: No fixed address

History
- NCCC wins: 10
- MCCAT wins: 7
- FP Trophy wins: 0
- Official website: http://www.berkshirecricket.org

Berkshire County Cricket Club is one of twenty minor counties clubs within the domestic cricket structure of England and Wales. It represents the historic county of Berkshire.

The team is currently a member of the National Counties Championship Western Division and plays in the NCCA Knockout Trophy. Berkshire played List A matches occasionally until 2005, but is not classified as a List A team per se.

== History ==
The first definite mention of cricket in Berkshire relates to the famous all rounder Thomas Waymark who resided at Bray Wick, near Maidenhead in the 1740s. In 1740, a combined Berkshire/Buckinghamshire/Hertfordshire team played two matches against London. Berkshire as a county team in its own right was first recorded in June 1769 when it played Surrey. From then until 1795, Berkshire's matches are recognised as important. (Note: Any match listed in the ACS' Important Match Guide (1981) is historically important, and therefore of the highest standard, whether or not a scorecard might exist. The same applies to numerous matches discovered by researchers since 1981. For further information, see First-class cricket.)

The strength of Berkshire lay in the Maidenhead club which was based at Old Field in Bray, Berkshire's usual home venue. In August 1795, Berkshire lost to Marylebone Cricket Club (MCC) at Lord's and then abruptly ceased to appear in the records.

Rowland Bowen's researches discovered evidence of a county organisation by 1841, but it may only have been a loose association of local clubs, as was sometimes the case elsewhere. Berkshire County Cricket Club was founded on 17 March 1895, the same year that the Minor Counties Championship began. Berkshire did not compete in the first year of the competition, but joined for 1896.

== Current squad ==
- * denotes the team captain
- ‡ denotes players who have played first-class cricket.

Name	Nat	Birth date	Batting style	Bowling style	Notes
Batsmen
Waqas Hussain	England	11 May 1992 (age 34)	Right-handed	Right-arm medium	
Brandon Gilmour	England	11 April 1996 (age 30)	Left-handed	Right-arm medium	
Andy Rishton‡	England	14 February 1995 (age 31)	Right-handed	Right-arm medium	
Oliver Birts	England	21 August 1997 (age 28)	Right-handed	Slow left-arm orthodox	
Dan Lincoln	England	26 May 1995 (age 31)	Right-handed	Right-arm medium	
Adam Dewes	England	27 October 1995 (age 30)	Right-handed	Right-arm medium	
Euan Woods	England	30 September 1998 (age 27)	Left-handed	Right-arm off break	
Archie Carter	England	15 October 2000 (age 25)	Right-handed	—	
All-rounders
Richard Morris* ‡	England	25 September 1987 (age 38)	Right-handed	Right-arm medium	
James Morris‡	England	17 January 1985 (age 41)	Right-handed	Leg break	
Adam Dewes	England	26 November 1996 (age 29)	Right-handed	Slow left-arm orthodox	
Jarryd Wallace	England	Unknown	Right-handed	Right-arm medium-fast	
Wicket-keepers
Joe Thomas	England	10 February 1998 (age 28)	Right-handed	—	
Stewart Davison‡	England	6 April 1991 (age 35)	Right-handed	—	
Joe Cracknell	England	16 March 2000 (age 26)	Right-handed	—	
Jack Davies	England	30 March 2000 (age 26)	Left-handed	—	England Under-19 player
Bowlers
Chris Peploe ‡	England	26 April 1981 (age 45)	Left-handed	Slow left-arm orthodox	
Callum Gregory	England	14 February 1997 (age 29)	Right-handed	Right-arm medium-fast	
Akbar Raja	England	6 May 1991 (age 35)	Right-handed	Slow left-arm orthodox	
Alexander Russell ‡	England	28 May 1998 (age 28)	Right-handed	Right-arm fast-medium	
Toby Greatwood	England	Unknown	Right-handed	Right-arm fast-medium	
Tom Nugent ‡	England	11 July 1994 (age 31)	Right-handed	Right-arm fast-medium	
Ethan Bamber ‡	England	17 December 1998 (age 27)	Right-handed	Right-arm fast-medium	

- Squad information correct as of 14 February 2019

== Notable players ==
=== International ===
This list includes those Berkshire players who have played in Test cricket since 1877, One Day International cricket since 1971, or a Twenty20 International since 2004.

England

- Danny Briggs
- Percy Chapman
- Tom Dollery
- John Emburey
- Aftab Habib
- Alan Igglesden
- Richard Johnson
- Peter May
- Albert Relf
- Graham Roope
- Shaun Udal
- Shoaib Bashir

Netherlands

- Billy Stelling

South Africa

- Charl Willoughby

West Indies (Cricket West Indies)

- Jimmy Adams

== Honours ==
- National Counties Championship (10) - 1924, 1928, 1953, 2008, 2016, 2017, 2018, 2019, 2022, 2024 (shared)
- NCCA Knockout Trophy (8) – 2004, 2011, 2013, 2017, 2019, 2021, 2022, 2023
- NCCA T20 Champions (1) - 2018
- NCCA Western Division Champions (7) 2016, 2017, 2018, 2019, 2022, 2024

== Bibliography ==
- A Guide to Important Cricket Matches Played in the British Isles 1709–1863. Nottingham: ACS. 1981. OCLC 85045528.
- ACS (1982). A Guide to First-class Cricket Matches Played in the British Isles. Nottingham: ACS. OCLC 10586869.
- Bowen, Rowland (1970). Cricket: A History of its Growth and Development. London: Eyre & Spottiswoode. ISBN 978-04-13278-60-9.
- Buckley, G. B. (1935). Fresh Light on 18th Century Cricket. Birmingham: Cotterell & Co. OCLC 23450280.
- Waghorn, H. T. (1899). Cricket Scores, Notes, &c. From 1730–1773. Edinburgh: Blackwood. OCLC 1086375331.
- Waghorn, H. T. (2005) [1906]. The Dawn of Cricket. London: J. W. McKenzie. ISBN 978-09-47821-17-3.
