= Ryan Adams (disambiguation) =

Ryan Adams (born 1974) is an American singer-songwriter, record producer, and poet.

Ryan Adams may also refer to:

- Ryan Adams (album), his eponymous 2014 studio album
- Ryan Adams (baseball) (born 1987), American former professional baseball second baseman
- Ryland Adams (Ryan Bruce Adams; born 1991), American YouTuber
- Ryan Adams (cricketer) (born 1993), English cricketer
- Ryan Preston Dunnell Adams (born 1993), American rapper better known as Rylo Rodriguez

== See also ==
- Bryan Adams (disambiguation)
