= Brian Adams =

Brian Adams may refer to:

- Brian Adams (admiral), Australian admiral, Deputy Chief of Navy (2000–2002)
- Brian Adams (basketball), American basketball coach
- Brian Adams (footballer) (born 1947), English former footballer
- Brian Adams (politician) (born 1969), member of the South Carolina Senate
- Brian Adams (racewalker) (born 1949), represented Great Britain at the 1976 Summer Olympics
- Brian Adams (wrestler) (1964–2007), professional wrestler and actor
- Brian Adams, chairman of Northern Irish team Ards F.C.

== See also ==
- Bryan Adams (disambiguation)
- Bryan Adams (born 1959), Canadian musical artist
- Brian Adam (1948–2013), Scottish politician
