= James Turpin =

James Turpin may refer to:

- James Turpin (organist) (1840–1896), English organist, composer and teacher
- James Turpin (cricketer) (born 1997), English cricketer
- James Turpin (diplomat), British diplomat
- James Wesley Turpin (born 1927), founder and director of Project Concern International
- James H. Turpin (1846–1893), American soldier and Medal of Honor recipient
- J. Clifford Turpin (1886–1966), pioneer aviator with the Wright Exhibition Team
