= Southcombe =

Southcombe is a surname. Notable people with the name include:

- Richard Southcombe (1909–1995), English cricketer for Somerset
- Tony Southcombe (born 1950), Australian rules football player
- William Southcombe Lloyd Webber, musician (1914-1982), father of Andrew Lloyd-Webber and Julian Lloyd-Webber
