= Phil Harris (cricketer) =

English cricketer (born 1990)

Personal information
- Full name: Philip Graham Harris
- Born: 12 May 1990 (age 36); Worcester, Worcestershire, England
- Nickname: PH
- Batting: Right-handed
- Bowling: Right-arm medium

Domestic team information
- Years: Team
- 2012: Cardiff MCCU
- 2012: Herefordshire

Career statistics
Competition	First-class
Matches	4
Runs scored	34
Batting average	17.00
100s/50s	–/–
Top score	20
Balls bowled	420
Wickets	5
Bowling average	49.00
5 wickets in innings	–
10 wickets in match	–
Best bowling	2/22
Catches/stumpings	–/–
- Source: Cricinfo, 29 July 2012

Philip Graham Harris (born 12 May 1990) is an English cricketer. Harris is a right-handed batsman who bowls right-arm medium pace. He was born at Worcester, Worcestershire.

Harris was educated at The Chase School, before studying for a degree in Sports Conditioning, Rehabilitation and Massage at the University of Wales Institute, Cardiff. While studying there, he made his debut in first-class cricket for Cardiff MCCU against Somerset at Taunton Vale Sports Club Ground. He made a second first-class appearance in that same season against Warwickshire at Edgbaston. He also made his minor counties debut for Herefordshire against Northumberland in the 2012 MCCA Knockout Trophy at The Park, Brockhampton. He is also a member of the Unicorns squad for the 2012 Clydesdale Bank 40.
