= Matt Hobden =

English cricketer (1993–2016)

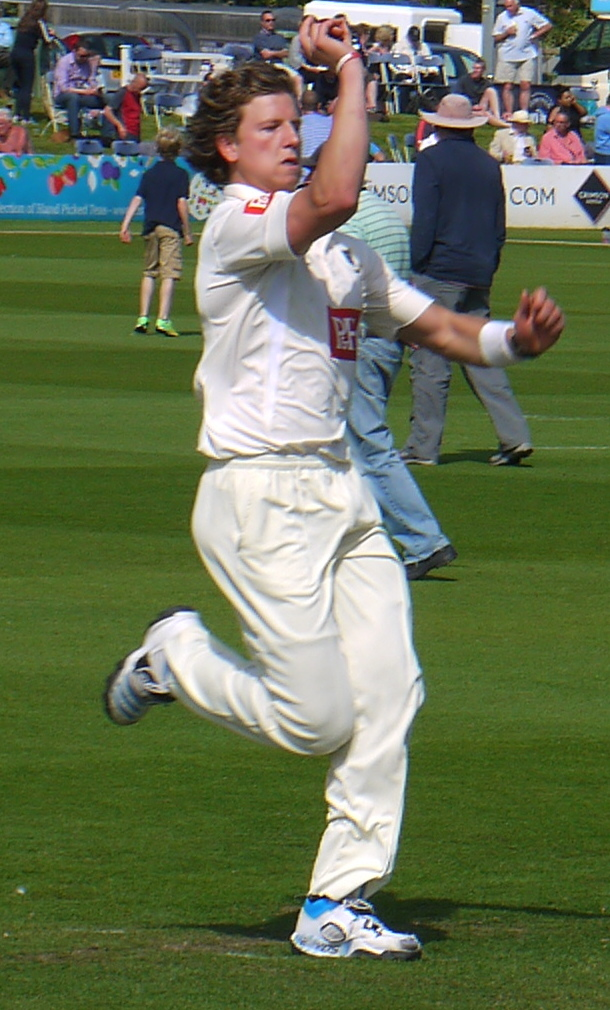
- Hobden in June 2015

Personal information
- Full name: Matthew Edward Hobden
- Born: 27 March 1993; Eastbourne, East Sussex, England
- Died: 2 January 2016 (aged 22); Forres, Moray, Scotland
- Batting: Right-handed
- Bowling: Right-arm fast-medium
- Role: Bowler

Domestic team information
- Years: Team
- 2012–2013: Cardiff MCCU
- 2013–2015: Sussex (squad no. 19)
- FC debut: 31 March 2012 Cardiff MCCU v Somerset
- Last FC: 19 July 2015 Sussex v Nottinghamshire
- LA debut: 21 June 2013 Sussex v Nottinghamshire
- Last LA: 19 August 2015 Sussex v Essex

Career statistics
Competition	FC	LA	T20
Matches	18	3	1
Runs scored	121	5	–
Batting average	9.30	5.00	–
100s/50s	0/1	0/0	–
Top score	65*	3*	–
Balls bowled	2,610	102	12
Wickets	48	1	0
Bowling average	39.35	88.00	–
5 wickets in innings	2	0	–
10 wickets in match	0	0	–
Best bowling	5/62	1/39	–
Catches/stumpings	3/–	0/–	0/–
- Source: CricketArchive, 2 January 2016

Matthew Edward Hobden (27 March 1993 – 2 January 2016) was an English cricketer, a right-arm fast-medium bowler who batted right-handed. Born in Eastbourne, East Sussex, Hobden was educated at Millfield School and Eastbourne College. A police investigation into his death concluded in May 2016 with no further action or arrests.

== Career ==
As a youngster, Hobden played for Glynde & Beddingham Cricket Club; in 2009, he was part of the team that won the National Village Cricket Knockout Final at Lord's. In 2012, Hobden started playing for Preston Nomads Cricket Team, and was part of the team that won the 2012 Sussex Premier League. Hobden's last match for the Nomads was in August 2015, where he returned figures of 1/6 from 7 overs.

While studying for a degree in Business Economics at Cardiff Metropolitan University, Hobden made his debut in first-class cricket for Cardiff MCCU against Somerset at Taunton Vale Sports Club Ground in 2012. He made a second first-class appearance that season against Warwickshire at Edgbaston, taking five wickets with figures of 5/62 in Warwickshire's first-innings. He also played club cricket for Ynysygerwn.

Hobden also played Second XI cricket for Sussex, and a day after signing a junior professional contract, he made his List A debut in a YB40 match against Nottinghamshire, with figures of 1/39 off 8 overs. In July 2013, he sustained a shin injury which ruled him out of the rest of the 2013 season.

In May 2014, Hobden signed a professional contract with Sussex. He made his County Championship debut on 1 June 2014, with match figures of 4/136. After the match, Hobden praised James Anyon, Jon Lewis and Steve Magoffin for encouraging him. Hobden was sidelined for a long spell of the 2014 season.

In April 2015, Hobden scored 65* in a Sussex record tenth-wicket partnership of 164 with Ollie Robinson. In May 2015, Hobden was criticised after bowling 14 no-balls in a County Championship match against Middlesex, with 11 no-balls in the opening 16 overs. The then Sussex captain Ed Joyce defended him, saying "I think Matt will be a fantastic cricketer for Sussex in the future but he is still young and learning his trade at the moment", and then coach Mark Robinson said that: "This is Matt’s first full year as a professional and we rate him highly", and "in terms of his long-term future what happened in the Middlesex game could turn out to be brilliant for him as it helps mould who you are." In the 2015 season, he took 21 wickets at an average of 47.30, and his last appearance was in a List A match against Essex in August 2015.

In total, Hobden played 18 first-class matches, three List A matches and one Twenty20 match, and was selected as one of six fast bowlers selected for the Potential England Performance Programme (PEPP) in the winters of 2014/15 and 2015/16, working with the senior team.

== Death and tributes ==
Hobden died suddenly on 2 January 2016, aged 22, in Forres, Scotland. Initially the local police treated his death as unexplained, stating "Enquiries are at a very early stage but there are not thought to be any suspicious circumstances." In May 2016 the investigation concluded, finding, according to newspaper reports, that "he was asleep on the roof of a mansion in Forres before tragically falling to his death. It is understood that with friends they had gone up on to the roof the previous evening to look at the stars."

His death was announced by Sussex County Cricket Club, who said that "Matthew was an exciting young cricketer with a big future ahead of him in the game." Speaking after Hobden's death, England fast bowling coach Kevin Shine said, "his potential was huge. He was improving rapidly and I'm certain that he would have played for England", and about his performance on the PEPP that, "he was the strongest, most powerful cricketer I've ever seen on that programme". The England Cricket Team official Facebook page posted, "we are shocked and saddened to hear of the death of Matthew Hobden. Our thoughts are with his family, friends and team-mates." Out of respect for Hobden, England players wore black armbands during the second day of the 2nd Test against South Africa on 3 January. Angus Porter, head of the Professional Cricketers' Association described Hobden as "a young seamer with immense potential." Sussex County Cricket Club announced that Hobden's shirt number (19) would be retired, and a tree would be planted at the County Ground in memory of Hobden.

A police investigation into his death concluded in May 2016 with no further action or arrests.
