= West Hendford Cricket Ground =

Cricket ground in Somerset

West Hendford
- The ground (top left) in 1938.

Ground information
- Location: Yeovil, Somerset
- Coordinates: 50.937°N 2.646°W
- Establishment: 1874
- Demolished: 1944

Team information
Yeovil Cricket Club	(1874–1944)
Yeovil Rugby Club	(1935–1944)
Somerset	(1935–1939)
- As of 29 March 2015; Source: CricketArchive

West Hendford Cricket Ground was a first-class cricket ground in Yeovil, Somerset. The land for the ground was first leased by Yeovil Cricket Club in 1874 and was also used for a range of other sports, most significantly hosting Yeovil Rugby Club in the 1890s and then again from 1935 until the ground was closed. Significant improvements were made to the ground during the 1930s, including the opening of a new pavilion jointly funded by the Rugby and Cricket clubs. The ground was demolished in 1944 when Westland Aircraft extended their factory, and both Yeovil Cricket Club and Rugby Club moved to Johnson Park.

Between 1935 and 1939, the ground hosted five annual Somerset County Cricket Club matches in July or August, the first of which nearly broke a county record for ticket sales on the gate. Somerset won only one of the five matches, the 1936 contest against Worcestershire.

== History ==
Yeovil and County Cricket Club was formed in 1865 and was the first attempt at setting up a county cricket team for Somerset. The attempt was unsuccessful, and the club broke up. In 1874, the club was re-formed with lesser remit, as Yeovil Cricket Club. As part of the club's resuscitation, the committee purchased the use of a field in West Hendford in Yeovil, from a local farmer, Mr Brook. The field, part of Key Farm, was leased for £10. There is a record of a match being played on the ground the following year between two sets of members of the Yeovil Cricket Club. During the late 19th century, the ground was used for other sports as well as cricket; it had a grass athletics track, and also hosted Yeovil Football Club, which at the time played both association and rugby football. The football club played at West Hendford on an irregular basis during the late 19th century, but returned in 1935, by which time they only played rugby, and had changed their name accordingly to Yeovil Rugby Club. In 1895, the cricket club committee announced that there was provision for a longer lease, of five or seven years, and that they would make improvements to the ground to enable it to host first-class cricket. The ground was also used for field hockey in the early 20th-century, hosting a Yeovil Hockey Club.

In 1932 the ground hosted greyhound racing after it switched from Barwick Fields. The racing was organised by the Salisbury Greyhound Race Club and the racing was Independent (unaffiliated to a governing body).

Somerset County Cricket Club played their first of five annual first-class matches on the ground in 1935. The match, against Surrey, was a significant event in the town, and a series of festivities were arranged to run alongside the three-day contest, including a dance and a smoking concert. Entry for the match, which took place from 17 to 19 August was one shilling, and attracted over 5,000 people, raising around £400. Surrey won the match by eight wickets. The takings from this match helped the Yeovil Cricket Club make further improvements to the ground, expanding it and adding further seating. The following year, Somerset played Worcestershire at the ground, in what the Western Gazette described as "Yeovil Cricket Festival". The captain of Yeovil Cricket Club, Richard Southcombe, was included in the Somerset team, which won the match by 170 runs. The takings were slightly lower than the previous year due to poor weather, but still described as "gratifying".

In 1937, Sussex beat Somerset at the ground, in a match that once again drew a crowd of around 5,000. The Yorkshire Evening Post described the wicket as "crumbling" towards the end of the match, favouring the bowlers. In 1938 Hampshire visited, and the report in the Western Daily Press lamented the state of the wicket, which meant that the game, like the three first-class matches at the ground before it, was completed in two days, rather than the scheduled three. That winter, a new pavilion costing £550 was erected on the ground for the shared use of the cricket club and the rugby club. The final first-class match on the ground was played in July 1939 against Lancashire, but torrential rain limited the match to only three hours of play. The takings for the full three days of the match were only £87, and the Taunton Courier estimated that the losses for the match could be hundreds of pounds. Despite the weather, almost 2,000 people attended the match, and the Taunton Courier report praised the alterations that had been made to the ground; the removal of a hedge made the ground lighter, while the ground itself had been well looked after, and drained quickly. The Second World War suspended the County Championship from 1940 to 1945, and during that time, Westland Aircraft took over the ground to expand their factory, and informed Yeovil Cricket Club that it was no longer available, forcing them to search for a new ground in 1946. They eventually relocated to the newly opened Johnson Park in 1948. The rugby club also moved to Johnson Park, amalgamating itself into Yeovil Sports Club. After a short break, Somerset County Cricket Club returned to Yeovil, playing fourteen fixtures at Johnson Park between 1951 and 1970, and eight matches at Westlands Sports Ground from 1971 to 1978.

== Records ==
During its limited use as a first-class cricket ground, only one century was scored on the ground, by Jim Parks. During the 1937 match, he scored 140 runs for Sussex. The most wickets taken by a bowler in a match at West Hendford was achieved in 1938, when Hampshire's Stuart Boyes took twelve wickets, including nine in the first innings. Somerset's only success on the ground was in 1936 against Worcestershire, who they dismissed for 60 runs in the first innings, and 77 in the second.
