= Sam Davies (cricketer) =

Welsh cricketer

Personal information
- Full name: Samuel Llyr Davies
- Born: 30 January 1992 (age 34); Neath, Glamorgan, Wales
- Nickname: Davies, Roider
- Batting: Right-handed
- Bowling: Left-arm medium

Domestic team information
- Years: Team
- 2012: Cardiff MCCU
- 2009–present: Glamorgan 2ndXI Wales Minor Counties

Career statistics
Competition	First-class
Matches	3
Runs scored	91
Batting average	22.75
100s/50s	–/–
Top score	42
Balls bowled	–
Wickets	–
Bowling average	–
5 wickets in innings	–
10 wickets in match	–
Best bowling	–
Catches/stumpings	1/–
- Source: Cricinfo, 29 July 2012

Samuel Llyr Davies (born 30 January 1992) is a Welsh cricketer. Davies is a right-handed batsman who bowls left-arm medium pace. He was born at Neath, Glamorgan, and was educated at Ysgol Gyfun Ystalyfera School and Neath College.

Davies made his 2nd XI debut for Glamorgan vs MCC young cricketers and has to date made over 25 appearances for the county. He later made his Test Match debut for Wales Minor Counties against Lincolnshire in the 2009 MCCA Knockout Trophy. His Minor Counties Championship debut came in the same season against Shropshire. To date he has made fourteen Minor Counties Championship and ten MCCA Knockout Trophy appearances. While studying for a degree in Sports Coaching at the University of Wales Institute, Cardiff, Davies made his debut in first-class cricket for Cardiff MCCU against Somerset in 2012 at Taunton Vale Sports Club Ground, making scores of 42 and 14.
