= James Seward =

James Seward may refer to:

- James Lindsay Seward (1813–1886), American politician from Georgia
- James L. Seward (New York politician) (1951–2024), American politician from New York
- James Seward (cricketer) (born 1997), English cricketer
