= Jonathan Denning =

Welsh cricketer

Personal information
- Full name: Jonathan Stephen Thomas Denning
- Born: 3 January 1991 (age 35); Abergavenny, Glamorgan, Wales
- Batting: Right-handed
- Bowling: Left-arm fast-medium

Domestic team information
- Years: Team
- 2009–2015: Wales Minor Counties
- 2013: Cardiff MCCU
- 2016: Buckinghamshire

Career statistics
Competition	First-class
Matches	2
Runs scored	28
Batting average	34.90
100s/50s	–/–
Top score	22*
Balls bowled	336
Wickets	3
Bowling average	52.00
5 wickets in innings	–
10 wickets in match	–
Best bowling	2/46
Catches/stumpings	1/–
- Source: Cricinfo, 4 August 2020

Jonathan Stephen Thomas Denning (born 3 January 1991) is a Welsh former first-class cricketer.

Denning was born at Abergavenny in January 1991. He was educated at Monmouth School, before going up to Cardiff Metropolitan University. While studying at Cardiff, he made two appearances in first-class cricket for Cardiff MCCU in 2013 against Glamorgan and Kent. Denning scored 28 runs in these matches, in addition to taking 3 wickets with his left-arm fast-medium bowling. In addition to playing first-class cricket, Denning also played minor counties cricket for Wales Minor Counties from 2009–15 and Buckinghamshire in 2016.
