= Nick Hammond (cricketer) =

English cricketer (born 1998)

Nicholas Hammond
Personal information
- Born: 3 February 1998 (age 28); Worcester, England
- Source: Cricinfo, 1 April 2018

Nicholas Hammond (born 3 February 1998) is an English cricketer. He made his first-class debut on 1 April 2018 for Loughborough MCCU against Sussex as part of the Marylebone Cricket Club University fixtures.
