= James Bracey =

English cricketer

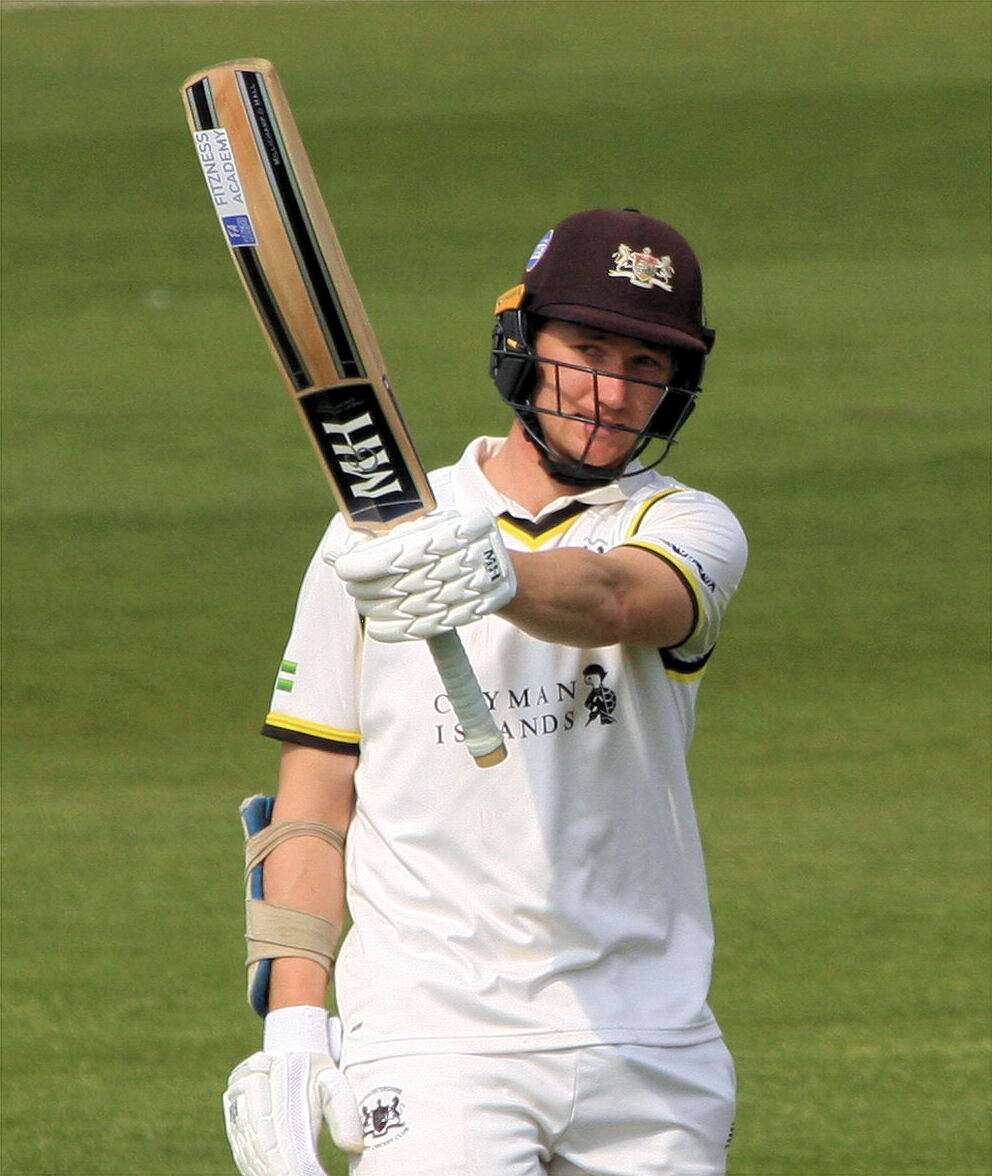
- Bracey in 2022

Personal information
- Full name: James Robert Bracey
- Born: 3 May 1997 (age 29); Bristol, England
- Batting: Left-handed
- Bowling: Right-arm medium
- Role: Batsman, Wicket-keeper
- Relatives: Sam Bracey (brother)

International information
- National side: England
- Test debut (cap 698): 2 June 2021 v New Zealand
- Last Test: 10 June 2021 v New Zealand

Domestic team information
- Years: Team
- 2016–present: Gloucestershire (squad no. 25)
- 2017–2018: Loughborough MCCU

Career statistics
Competition	Test	FC	LA	T20
Matches	2	121	57	86
Runs scored	8	7,317	2,450	1,198
Batting average	2.66	37.52	46.22	17.88
100s/50s	0/0	21/30	6/12	0/3
Top score	8	204*	224*	70
Balls bowled	–	60	18	–
Wickets	–	0	1	–
Bowling average	–	–	23.00	–
5 wickets in innings	–	–	0	–
10 wickets in match	–	–	0	–
Best bowling	–	–	1/23	–
Catches/stumpings	6/0	284/21	58/10	52/16
- Source: ESPNcricinfo, 27 September 2026

James Robert Bracey (born 3 May 1997) is an English cricketer who plays for Gloucestershire County Cricket Club. He is a left-handed batsman, who also plays as a wicket-keeper. He made his first-class debut for Gloucestershire against Sussex in September 2016. He made his international debut for the England cricket team in June 2021. His brother, Sam, has also played first-class cricket.

== Career ==
He made his List A debut on 21 April 2019, for Gloucestershire in the 2019 Royal London One-Day Cup. He made his T20 debut on 19 July 2019, for Gloucestershire against Glamorgan, in the 2019 T20 Blast.

On 29 May 2020, Bracey was named in a 55-man group of players to begin training ahead of international fixtures starting in England following the COVID-19 pandemic. On 17 June 2020, Bracey was included in England's 30-man squad to start training for the Test series against the West Indies, which was held behind closed doors due to the COVID-19 pandemic. On 4 July 2020, Bracey was named as one of the nine reserve players for the first Test match of the series. He was retained as part of the squad for the following Test series against Pakistan. In the final Test of the series he played as a substitute fielder on the final day and caught Asad Shafiq off the bowling of captain Joe Root as the match finished in a draw.

In December 2020, Bracey was named as one of seven reserve players in England's Test squad for their series against Sri Lanka. In January 2021, he was also named as a reserve player in England's Test squad for their series against India. In May 2021, Bracey was named in England's Test squad for their series against New Zealand. Bracey made his Test debut on 2 June 2021, for England against New Zealand.

== Personal life ==
Bracey was born in Bristol and is an avid supporter of Bristol Rovers.
