= Stewart Davison =

English cricketer

Personal information
- Full name: Stewart Richard Davison
- Born: 6 April 1991 (age 35); Basingstoke, Hampshire, England
- Batting: Right-handed
- Role: Wicket-keeper

Domestic team information
- Years: Team
- 2010–2018: Berkshire
- 2013: Oxford MCCU

Career statistics
Competition	First-class
Matches	2
Runs scored	26
Batting average	6.50
100s/50s	–/–
Top score	13
Catches/stumpings	7/–
- Source: Cricinfo, 13 February 2019

Stewart Richard Davison (born 6 April 1991) is an English first-class cricketer.

Davison made his debut in minor counties cricket for Berkshire against Norfolk in the 2010 MCCA Knockout Trophy, as well as making his Minor Counties Championship debut in the same year against Herefordshire. While studying at Oxford Brookes University, he played first-class cricket in two matches for Oxford MCCU in 2013 against Warwickshire and Worcestershire. As of 2019, Davison has played fifty Minor Counties Championship matches for Berkshire, alongside 31 MCCA Knockout Trophy matches, and eight matches in the minor counties 20-over competition.
