= Jake George =

English cricketer (born 1994)

Personal information
- Full name: Jacob George
- Born: 5 April 1994 (age 32); Ealing, London, England
- Batting: Right-handed
- Bowling: Right-arm off break

Domestic team information
- Years: Team
- 2014–2015: Cardiff MCCU

Career statistics
Competition	First-class
Matches	4
Runs scored	43
Batting average	7.16
100s/50s	–/–
Top score	14
Catches/stumpings	1/–
- Source: Cricinfo, 4 August 2020

Jacob 'Jake' George (born 5 April 1994) is an English former first-class cricketer.

George was born at Ealing in May 1994. He grew up on the Isle of Wight, where he attended Ventnor Middle School, before attending Portsmouth Grammar School on the mainland. After completing his secondary education, he went up to Cardiff University. While studying at Cardiff, he made four appearances in first-class cricket for Cardiff MCCU, making two appearances each in 2014 and 2015. George struggled as a batsman against first-class county opposition, scoring just 43 runs in his four matches at an average of 7.16, with a high score of 14. Prior to playing for Cardiff MCCU, George held a contract at Hampshire but did not feature for the county and was released prior to the 2014 season. He played his club cricket on the Isle of Wight for Ventnor Cricket Club. In 2014 he recorded the fourth highest individual score in the Southern Premier Cricket League up to that date, making 175 for Ventnor against Hampshire Academy.
