= Harry Powell (cricketer) =

Welsh cricketer

Personal information
- Full name: Harrison William Powell
- Born: 1 June 1995 (age 31); Monmouth, Monmouthshire, Wales
- Batting: Right-handed
- Bowling: Right-arm fast-medium

Domestic team information
- Years: Team
- 2011–2016: Wales Minor Counties
- 2014: Cardiff MCCU

Career statistics
Competition	First-class
Matches	2
Runs scored	16
Batting average	–
100s/50s	–/–
Top score	16*
Balls bowled	168
Wickets	1
Bowling average	147.00
5 wickets in innings	–
10 wickets in match	–
Best bowling	1/26
Catches/stumpings	–/–
- Source: Cricinfo, 4 August 2020

Harrison 'Harry' William Powell (born 1 June 1995) is a Welsh former first-class cricketer.

Powell was born at Monmouth in June 1995. He was educated at St Joseph's Roman Catholic High School, before going up to Cardiff University. While studying at Cardiff, he made two appearances in first-class cricket for Cardiff MCCU in 2014 against Glamorgan and Gloucestershire. Playing as a right-arm fast-medium bowler, he took just one wicket in his two matches. In addition to playing first-class cricket, Powell also played minor counties cricket for Wales Minor Counties from 2011–16.
