= Adam Miles =

English cricketer (born 1989)

Personal information
- Full name: Adam James Miles
- Born: 19 September 1989 (age 37); Swindon, Wiltshire, England
- Batting: Right-handed
- Role: Wicket-keeper
- Relatives: Craig Miles (brother)

Domestic team information
- Years: Team
- 2007–2014: Wiltshire
- 2012–2013: Cardiff MCCU
- 2015/16: Otago
- FC debut: 6 April 2012 Cardiff MCCU v Warwickshire
- Last FC: 24 October 2015 Otago v Canterbury

Career statistics
Competition	First-class
Matches	5
Runs scored	65
Batting average	13.00
100s/50s	0/0
Top score	29*
Catches/stumpings	5/0
- Source: ESPNcricinfo, 23 November 2023

Adam James Miles (born 19 September 1989) is an English-born cricket coach and former cricketer.

Miles played for Wiltshire County Cricket Club in the Minor Counties Championship between 2007 and 2014 and made first-class cricket appearances for Cardiff MCC University between 2012 and 2013 whilst a student. He played two matches in New Zealand for Otago during the 2015–16 season and has since settled the country.

Born at Swindon in Wiltshire in 1989, Miles was educated at Bradon Forest School in Purton and at Filton College before studying psychology at university in Cardiff. A wicket-keeper, he played for Wiltshire age-group teams before making his Minor Counties Championship debut for the county team in 2007. He played for Gloucestershire' Second XI between 2007 and 2009 and made his first-class debut for Cardiff MCCU against Warwickshire in April 2012.

From 2013 to 2021 he worked for the Otago Cricket Association in a variety of roles, including as a coach and as the association's talent development manager. He has also worked as a coach for the New Zealand under-19 team and worked for the New Zealand Netball Players Association.
