= Joseph Ludlow =

English cricketer (born 1997)

Personal information
- Born: 22 August 1997 (age 29)
- Batting: Right-handed
- Source: Cricinfo, 1 April 2018

Joseph Ludlow (born 22 August 1997) is an English cricketer. He made his first-class debut on 1 April 2018 for Cardiff MCCU against Gloucestershire as part of the Marylebone Cricket Club University fixtures.
