= Sam Pearce =

Welsh cricketer (born 1997)

Personal information
- Full name: Samuel James Pearce
- Born: 2 September 1997 (age 29); Bridgend, Wales
- Batting: Right-handed
- Bowling: Right-arm leg break

Domestic team information
- Years: Team
- 2018–2019: Cardiff MCCU
- 2021: Glamorgan (squad no. 19)
- First-class debut: 1 April 2018 Cardiff MCCU v Gloucestershire
- Twenty20 debut: 29 June 2021 Glamorgan v Surrey

Career statistics
Competition	FC	T20
Matches	4	4
Runs scored	55	11
Batting average	13.75	5.50
100s/50s	0/0	0/0
Top score	35	5
Balls bowled	196	68
Wickets	1	0
Bowling average	164.00	–
5 wickets in innings	0	–
10 wickets in match	0	–
Best bowling	1/74	–
Catches/stumpings	0/–	1/–
- Source: Cricinfo, 25 September 2021

Samuel James Pearce (born 2 September 1997) is a Welsh cricketer. He made his first-class debut on 1 April 2018 for Cardiff MCCU against Gloucestershire as part of the Marylebone Cricket Club University fixtures. He made his Twenty20 debut on 29 June 2021, for Glamorgan in the 2021 T20 Blast.
