= Greg Holmes (cricketer) =

Welsh cricketer

Personal information
- Full name: Gregory Clarke Holmes
- Born: 22 September 1993 (age 33); Neath, Glamorgan, Wales
- Batting: Right-handed
- Bowling: Right-arm medium
- Relatives: Geoff Holmes (father)

Domestic team information
- Years: Team
- 2016: Cardiff MCCU

Career statistics
Competition	First-class
Matches	2
Runs scored	0
Batting average	0.00
100s/50s	0/0
Top score	0
Balls bowled	18
Wickets	0
Bowling average	–
5 wickets in innings	0
10 wickets in match	0
Best bowling	–
Catches/stumpings	1/–
- Source: ESPNcricinfo, 26 March 2016

Gregory Clarke Holmes (born 22 September 1993) is a Welsh cricketer. He is right hand batsman and right arm medium bowler. Holmes was born in Neath, Glamorgan, Wales and is son of Geoff Holmes, a former first-class cricketer and Cricket Board of Wales director. Holmes was educated at Radyr Comprehensive School and attended Cardiff Metropolitan University.

== Career ==
Holmes made his debut for Wales in the 2012 Minor Counties Championship against Cheshire. Holmes played Minor counties cricket for Wales from 2012 to 2017, which included 18 Minor Counties Championship matches, 13 MCCA Knockout Trophy matches and 7 Minor Counties T20 matches. Holmes also played the Second XI competitions for Glamorgan from 2011 to 2016, including 13 Second XI Championship matches, 4 Second XI Trophy matches, and 19 Second XI T20 matches, Holmes played two first-class matches for Cardiff MCCU in 2016 against Hampshire and Glamorgan with both matches ending in a draw.
