= William Jones (cricketer, born 1990) =

Australian-born English cricketer

Personal information
- Full name: William Stephen Jones
- Born: 26 March 1990 (age 36); Perth, Western Australia
- Batting: Right-handed
- Bowling: Leg break

Domestic team information
- Years: Team
- 2011–2012: Leicestershire (squad no. 25)

Career statistics
Competition	First-class	List A
Matches	7	5
Runs scored	227	59
Batting average	16.21	14.75
100s/50s	0/0	0/0
Top score	48	44
Balls bowled	216	18
Wickets	5	0
Bowling average	36.00	–
5 wickets in innings	0	–
10 wickets in match	0	–
Best bowling	3/71	–
Catches/stumpings	5/–	2/–
- Source: Cricinfo, 1 April 2013

William Stephen Jones (born 26 March 1990) is an Australian-born former English professional cricketer. Jones played as a right-handed batsman who bowled leg break. He was born in Perth, Western Australia.

Jones made his Minor Counties Championship debut for Hertfordshire against Cumberland in 2009. He played five further Minor Counties Championship fixtures that season, the last coming against Northumberland. The following season he played two MCCA Knockout Trophy matches against Dorset and Oxfordshire.

Having played for the Leicestershire Second XI, he made his full Leicestershire debut in a List A match against Surrey at The Oval in the 2011 Clydesdale Bank 40. He made his County Championship debut in the last game of the 2011 season against Middlesex at Grace Road.

Jones studied at Cardiff University, where he played for Cardiff MCCU against first-class opposition.

Currently working at The NU B.V.
