= Will Rollings =

English cricketer (born 1994)

Personal information
- Born: 4 September 1994 (age 32)
- Source: Cricinfo, 1 April 2018

Will Rollings (born 4 September 1994) is an English cricketer. He made his first-class debut on 1 April 2018 for Loughborough MCCU against Sussex as part of the Marylebone Cricket Club University fixtures.
