= Alexander Woodland =

English cricketer (born 1998)

Personal information
- Full name: Alexander James Woodland
- Born: 16 January 1998 (age 28); Windsor, Berkshire, England
- Batting: Left-handed
- Bowling: Right-arm medium

Domestic team information
- Years: Team
- 2018–2019: Cardiff MCCU
- First-class debut: 1 April 2018 Cardiff MCCU v Gloucestershire

Career statistics
Competition	First-class
Matches	3
Runs scored	12
Batting average	4.00
100s/50s	0/0
Top score	11
Balls bowled	120
Wickets	0
Bowling average	–
5 wickets in innings	–
10 wickets in match	–
Best bowling	–
Catches/stumpings	2/–
- Source: Cricinfo, 10 April 2019

Alexander James Woodland (born 16 January 1998) is an English cricketer. He made his first-class debut on 1 April 2018 for Cardiff MCCU against Gloucestershire as part of the Marylebone Cricket Club University fixtures.

Preceded by Ben Waring	Young Wisden Schools Cricketer of the Year; 2017	Succeeded by Teddie Casterton
