= Leon Brown (rugby union) =

Welsh rugby union player (born 1996)

- Full name: Leon Michael Brown
- Born: 26 October 1996 (age 30) Newport, Wales
- Height: 1.90 m (6 ft 3 in)
- Weight: 126 kg (278 lb; 19 st 12 lb)
- School: St. Joseph's Roman Catholic High School

Rugby union career
- Position: Prop
- Current team: Dragons
Senior career
Years	Team	Apps	(Points)
2015–2024	Dragons	78	(25)
International career
Years	Team	Apps	(Points)
2015–2016	Wales U20	9	(5)
2017–2024	Wales	24	(0)

Leon Michael Brown (born 26 October 1996) is a Welsh former professional rugby union player who played as a prop for the Dragons and the Wales national team.

== Club career ==
Brown began playing rugby for St Joseph's youth side, before attending St Joseph's Roman Catholic High School and Newport High School. Brown was involved with the Dragons Academy, first appearing for the U16 side as a replacement against the Ospreys in 2012. While playing for feeder club Cross Keys, Brown was named Player of the Month for October 2015.

Prior to making his first team debut, Brown played for the Dragons Premiership Select team in the British and Irish Cup.

On 12 November 2016, Brown made his debut for the Dragons, coming on as a replacement against Leicester Tigers in the Anglo-Welsh Cup. He made his first start the following week, against the Scarlets. He scored his first try on 27 October 2017 against the Ospreys. Brown signed a contract extension in late 2017, having just been selected to the Welsh squad for the forthcoming Autumn series.

Brown scored against the Ospreys on 4 January 2020, helping the Dragons to a 25–18 win. He scored again against the Ospreys on 23 August 2020, as the Dragons came back to earn a last minute 20–20 draw. Brown was named in the 2019–2020 Pro14 Dream Team, only the second time a Dragons player had been chosen in the team.

Brown signed an extension with the Dragons in 2021, turning down interest from Premiership clubs Exeter and Gloucester.

Having dealt with a nerve injury on and off for two years, he underwent surgery in 2022 to correct the issue. This led to nine additional months on the sidelines as he healed, but Brown made a successful return to fitness in early 2023, appearing off the bench for the Dragons against the Lions. Another neck and shoulder injury caused him to miss the final match of the season.

Ahead of the 2024–25 United Rugby Championship, Brown signed another extension with the Dragons.

In late 2024, Brown had neck surgery to correct an ongoing issue. On 7 January 2025, Brown announced his retirement due to injury.

== International career ==
Brown represented Wales at all age grades: U16, U18, and U20. Brown was selected in the Wales U18 side that toured South Africa in 2015. In 2016, Brown was part of the Wales U20 team that won a Six Nations Grand Slam.

In August 2016 Brown was selected for the senior Wales training squad ahead of the Autumn international series. He was included in the Wales players squad for the 2017 Autumn internationals. Brown made his Wales senior debut on 10 November 2017 versus Australia as a second-half substitute. The following week, he made his first start, as Wales beat Georgia.

Brown was selected in the initial 42–man training squad for the 2019 Rugby World Cup, and played in a summer friendly against Ireland, but did not make the final squad for the tournament. He was brought back into the Wales team by new head coach Wayne Pivac for the friendly against the Barbarians, and was named on the bench for the fixture.

During the 2021 Six Nations Championship, Brown came off the bench in every match, winning the Championship title as well as the Triple Crown. He was selected for the 2021 Summer tests, starting in the final match against Argentina.

Brown was initially selected for the 2022 Wales rugby union tour of South Africa, but ruled out due to injury. This injury would further rule him out of the 2022 Autumn test matches. Upon returning to fitness, Brown was selected in the squad for the 2023 Six Nations Championship. Brown made one appearance, coming off the bench against Scotland on 11 February 2023.

Brown was not selected for the extended Wales training squad ahead of the 2023 Rugby World Cup.

He returned to the Wales squad for the 2024 Six Nations Championship. Brown started in the opening match against Scotland, but was substituted off at half time due to injury, and subsequently missed the remainder of the tournament.
