= Thomas Hamilton (cricketer, born 1992) =

English cricketer

Personal information
- Full name: Thomas Stuart Ian Hamilton
- Born: 22 November 1992 (age 33); Derby, Derbyshire, England
- Batting: Right-handed
- Bowling: Right-arm medium

Domestic team information
- Years: Team
- 2014: Cardiff MCCU

Career statistics
| Competition | First-class |
|---|---|
| Matches | 1 |
| Runs scored | 38 |
| Batting average | 38.00 |
| 100s/50s | –/– |
| Top score | 38 |
| Balls bowled | 24 |
| Wickets | 0 |
| Bowling average | – |
| 5 wickets in innings | – |
| 10 wickets in match | – |
| Best bowling | – |
| Catches/stumpings | –/– |
- Source: Cricinfo, 4 August 2020

Thomas Stuart Ian Hamilton (born 23 November 1992) is an English former first-class cricketer.

Hamilton was born at Derby in November 1992. He was educated there at Chellaston Academy, before going up to Cardiff University. While studying at Cardiff, he made a single appearance in first-class cricket for Cardiff MCCU in 2014 and Gloucestershire at Bristol. Batting once in the match, he was dismissed by Jack Taylor for 38 in Cardiff MCCU's only innings, in addition to bowling nine wicketless overs across both Gloucestershire innings'.
