= Sam Bracey =

English cricketer

Personal information
- Full name: Samuel Nicholas Bracey
- Born: 19 May 1994 (age 32); Bristol, England
- Batting: Right-handed
- Role: Wicket-keeper
- Relatives: James Bracey (brother)

Domestic team information
- Years: Team
- 2014–2015: Cardiff MCCU

Career statistics
Competition	First-class
Matches	3
Runs scored	22
Batting average	11.00
100s/50s	–/–
Top score	20
Catches/stumpings	4/–
- Source: Cricinfo, 4 August 2020

Samuel Nicholas Bracey (born 19 May 1994) is an English former first-class cricketer.

Bracey was born at Bristol in May 1994. He was educated at Winterbourne Academy, before going up to Cardiff Metropolitan University. While studying at Cardiff, he made three appearances in first-class cricket for Cardiff MCCU, making two appearances in 2014 and one in 2015. Playing as a wicket-keeper, he scored 22 runs and took 4 catches behind the stumps. His brother, James, plays county cricket for Gloucestershire.
