= Harry Rouse =

English cricketer (born 1993)

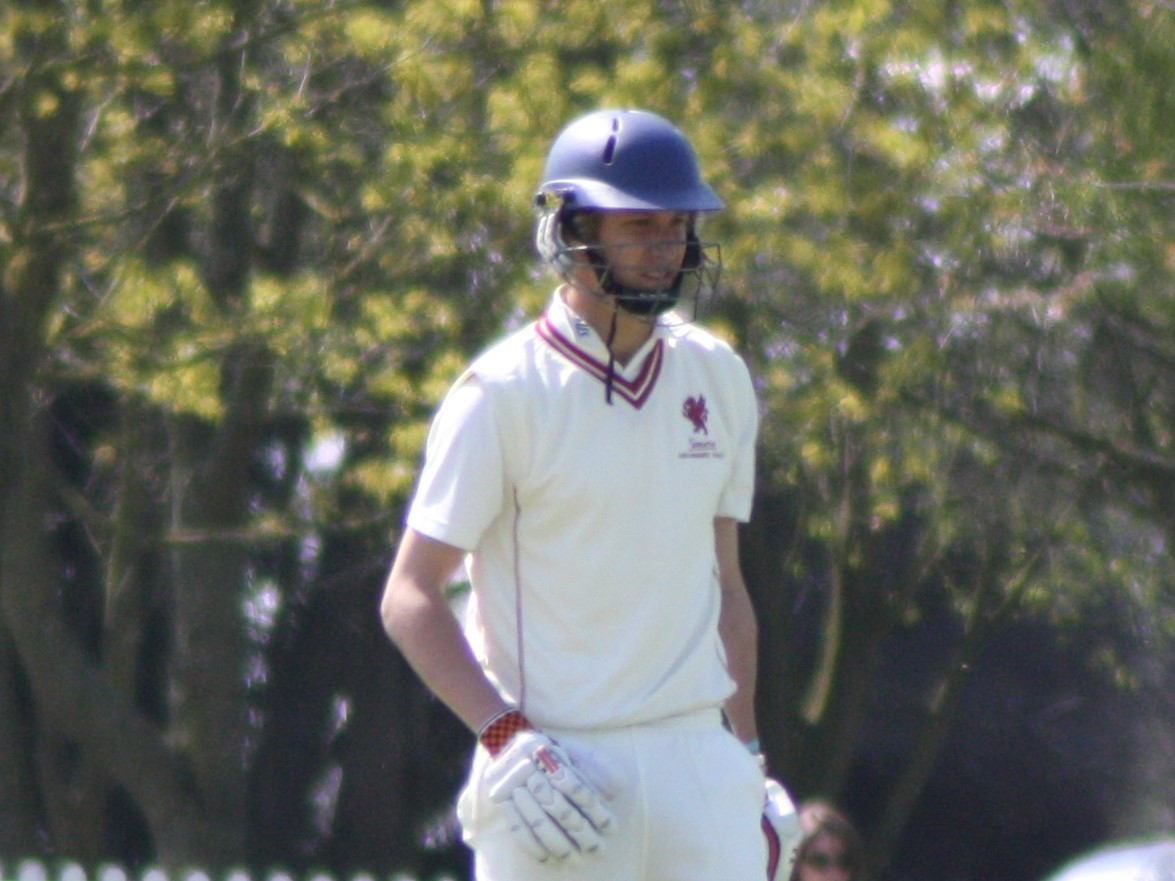

Personal information
- Full name: Harry Philip Rouse
- Born: 20 October 1993 (age 33); Sheffield, Yorkshire, England
- Batting: Right-handed
- Bowling: Right-arm fast-medium
- Relatives: Tim Rouse (brother)

Domestic team information
- Years: Team
- 2013–2015: Leeds/Bradford MCCU
- First-class debut: 5 April 2013 Leeds/Bradford MCCU v Yorkshire
- Last First-class: 7 April 2015 Leeds/Bradford MCCU v Yorkshire

Career statistics
Competition	First-class
Matches	4
Runs scored	84
Batting average	16.80
100s/50s	0/0
Top score	23
Balls bowled	672
Wickets	6
Bowling average	70.83
5 wickets in innings	0
10 wickets in match	0
Best bowling	3/45
Catches/stumpings	0/–
- Source: ESPNcricinfo, 7 September 2016

Harry Philip Rouse (born 20 October 1993) is an English cricketer. He is a right-handed batsman and a right-arm fast medium bowler and has represented Leeds/Bradford MCC University in first-class cricket. He made his first-class debut for Leeds/Bradford MCCU against Yorkshire on 5 April 2013.
