= St Joseph's Roman Catholic High School, Newport =

Coordinates: 51.5573°N 3.0236°W

St Joseph's RC High School

Location
- Pencarn Way, Tredegar Park; Newport, NP10 8XH; Wales

Information
- Type: Voluntary-aided school
- Religious affiliation: Roman Catholic
- Established: 1967
- Head teacher: Jane Morgan
- Gender: Mixed
- Age range: 11–18
- Enrolment: 1,295
- Website: sjhs.org.uk

St. Joseph's RC High School is a secondary high school on the outskirts of Newport, Wales.

== School history and performance ==
The school was a case study in research published by the Australian Council for Educational Research. The research describes progress from "considerable underachievement" in 1994 to above average performance by 2008.

In the school's 2018 Estyn inspection report it was assessed as 'good' on four of the five standards, and as 'excellent' in Care, Guidance and Support.

== Extracurricular activities and clubs ==
Estyn noted the school's extra-curricular provision, including trips, chaplaincy meetings, a gardening club, a folk group, sports' clubs, a fairtrade club and work on recycling. There are also book clubs and a reading buddy scheme.

The school competes in the Young Enterprise competition, where pupils get to start and run their own business. In 2007 the team received a series of prizes:

- Runner Up: Gwent Best Company Overall
- Runner Up: Best Use of IT
- First Place: Company Report
- Runner Up: Best Trade Stand

In 2008 it bettered these results winning:-

- 1st Prize in every category at the Newport and Monmouthshire Young Enterprise 2008 final

In the Gwent Final they won;

- Best Company Report
- Best Trade Stand
- Runner-up Best Company
- Best presentation

== Notable alumni ==
- Leon Brown (born 1996), rugby union player
- James Collins (born 1983), footballer
- Michael Flynn (born 1980), footballer
- Phillipa Knowles (born 1972), International judoka
- Rollin Menayese (born 1997), footballer
- Harry Powell (born 1995), cricketer
