= Lorenzo Machado =

South African cricketer (born 1998)

Personal information
- Born: 1 February 1998 (age 28)
- Source: Cricinfo, 1 April 2018

Lorenzo Machado (born 1 February 1998) is a South African cricketer. He made his first-class debut on 1 April 2018 for Cardiff MCCU against Gloucestershire as part of the Marylebone Cricket Club University fixtures.
