= James Morris (cricketer) =

English cricketer (born 1985)

Personal information
- Full name: James Calum Morris
- Born: 17 January 1985 (age 41); Welwyn Garden City, Hertfordshire, England
- Batting: Right-handed
- Bowling: Right-arm leg break
- Relatives: Richard Morris (brother)

Domestic team information
- Years: Team
- 2002–2019: Berkshire
- 2005–2007: Durham UCCE
- 2006: British Universities

Career statistics
Competition	First-class	List A
Matches	10	2
Runs scored	444	17
Batting average	23.36	17.00
100s/50s	0/3	0/0
Top score	81	17
Balls bowled	890	24
Wickets	13	0
Bowling average	52.07	–
5 wickets in innings	0	–
10 wickets in match	0	–
Best bowling	2/29	–
Catches/stumpings	9/–	0/–
- Source: Cricinfo, 28 May 2022

James Calum Morris (born 17 January 1985) is an English cricketer. Morris is a right-handed batsman who bowls leg break. He was born at Welwyn Garden City, Hertfordshire.

== Berkshire career ==
Barrow made his Minor Counties Championship debut for Berkshire in 2002 against Cornwall. From 2002 to present, he has represented the county in 29 Minor Counties Championship matches. Morris also plays in the MCCA Knockout Trophy for Berkshire. His debut in that competition came in 2002 when Berkshire played Buckinghamshire. From 2002 to present, he represented the county in 16 Trophy matches.

Additionally, he also played List-A matches for Berkshire. His List-A debut for the county came against Norfolk the 2nd round of the 2003 Cheltenham & Gloucester Trophy, which was played in 2002. His second and final List-A match for the county came against Durham in the 3rd round of the 2003 Cheltenham & Gloucester Trophy at Sonning Lane, Reading. In his 2 matches, he scored 17 runs at a batting average of 17.00, with a high score of 17.

== First-class career ==
Morris made his first-class debut for Durham UCCE against Durham in 2005. From 2005 to 2007, he represented Durham UCCE in 7 first-class matches, the last of which came against Durham. In 2006, he played a single first-class match for a combined British Universities team against Sri Lanka A. In 2007, he played 2 first-class matches for the Marylebone Cricket Club against the West Indians during their 2007 tour of England, and against Sri Lanka A. In his 7 first-class matches, he scored 444 runs at a batting average of 23.26, with a single half century high score of 81. With the ball the took 13 wickets at a bowling average of 52.07. In the field he took 9 catches.

== Family ==
His brother Richard has represented Loughborough UCCE in first-class cricket and represented Berkshire in Minor Counties cricket in 2009.
