= Richard Morris (English cricketer) =

English cricketer

Personal information
- Full name: Richard Kyle Morris
- Born: 26 September 1987 (age 39); Newbury, Berkshire, England
- Batting: Right-handed
- Bowling: Right-arm fast-medium
- Relatives: James Morris (brother)

Domestic team information
- Years: Team
- 2006–2008: Loughborough UCCE
- 2009–: Berkshire
- FC debut: 15 April 2006 Loughborough UCCE v Essex
- Last FC: 7 May 2008 Loughborough UCCE v Worcestershire

Career statistics
Competition	First-class
Matches	5
Runs scored	97
Batting average	24.25
100s/50s	0/1
Top score	88
Balls bowled	360
Wickets	5
Bowling average	54.80
5 wickets in innings	0
10 wickets in match	0
Best bowling	2/58
Catches/stumpings	1/–
- Source: Cricinfo, 13 July 2009

Richard Kyle Morris (born 26 September 1987) is an English cricketer who played first-class cricket for Loughborough University.

Morris joined Hampshire but was unable to break into the first team and was released by the club at the end of the 2008 County Championship. Since 2009 he has played for Berkshire in the Minor Counties Championship and was a member of the Berkshire teams that won four consecutive titles from 2016 to 2019.
