= William Pereira (cricketer) =

English cricketer (born 1996)

Personal information
- Born: 11 October 1996 (age 30)
- Source: Cricinfo, 1 April 2018

William Pereira (born 11 October 1996) is an English cricketer. He made his first-class debut on 1 April 2018 for Loughborough MCCU against Sussex as part of the Marylebone Cricket Club University fixtures.
