= John Bowers (cricketer) =

English cricketer (born 1996)

Personal information
- Born: 18 May 1996 (age 30)
- Batting: Left-handed
- Role: Wicket-keeper

Domestic team information
- Years: Team
- 2015–2018: Cambridge MCCU (squad no. 13)
- Source: Cricinfo, 8 April 2018

John Bowers (born 18 May 1996) is an English cricketer. He made his first-class debut on 7 April 2018 for Cambridge MCCU against Essex as part of the Marylebone Cricket Club University fixtures.
