= Harry Adair =

English cricketer (born 1997)

Personal information
- Full name: Henry Robert David Adair
- Born: 14 December 1997 (age 28); Chesterfield, England
- Batting: Right-handed
- Bowling: Legbreak
- Source: Cricinfo, 1 April 2018

Harry Adair (born 14 December 1997) is an English cricketer. He made his first-class debut on 1 April 2018 for Oxford MCCU against Kent as part of the Marylebone Cricket Club University fixtures. He made his Twenty20 debut on 23 August 2019, for Durham in the 2019 t20 Blast.
