= Oskar Kolk =

English cricketer

Personal information
- Full name: Oskar Magnus David Kolk
- Born: 9 January 1997 (age 29); Guildford, Surrey, England
- Batting: Right-handed
- Bowling: Right-arm off break Right-arm medium-fast

Domestic team information
- Years: Team
- 2018–2019: Wales Minor Counties
- 2019: Cardiff MCCU
- 2020/21: Eagles

Career statistics
Competition	First-class
Matches	4
Runs scored	80
Batting average	13.33
100s/50s	0/0
Top score	33
Balls bowled	126
Wickets	2
Bowling average	39.50
5 wickets in innings	0
10 wickets in match	0
Best bowling	2/79
Catches/stumpings	2/–
- Source: Cricinfo, 3 August 2025

Oskar Magnus David Kolk (born 9 January 1997) is an English first-class cricketer.

Kolk was born at Guildford in January 1997. He was educated at Reed's School, before going up to Cardiff University. While studying at Cardiff, he made two appearances in first-class cricket for Cardiff MCCU against Somerset and Sussex in 2019. He scored 42 runs in his two matches, with a high score of 33. In addition to playing first-class cricket, Kolk also played minor counties cricket for Wales Minor Counties in 2018–19.

In December 2020, he was selected to play for the Eagles in the 2020–21 Logan Cup in Zimbabwe.
