= Freddie Ruffell =

English cricketer (born 1997)

Personal information
- Full name: Frederick William Arthur Ruffell
- Born: 4 January 1997 (age 29); Lambeth, London, England
- Batting: Right-handed
- Bowling: Right-arm medium

Domestic team information
- Years: Team
- 2017: Norfolk
- 2018: Durham MCCU

Career statistics
Competition	First-class
Matches	2
Runs scored	–
Batting average	–
100s/50s	–/–
Top score	–
Balls bowled	162
Wickets	0
Bowling average	–
5 wickets in innings	–
10 wickets in match	–
Best bowling	–
Catches/stumpings	–/–
- Source: ESPNcricinfo, 15 July 2019

Frederick William Arthur Ruffell (born 4 January 1997), also known as Freddie Ruffell, is an English former first-class cricketer. He made his first-class debut on 1 April 2018 for Durham MCCU against Warwickshire as part of the Marylebone Cricket Club University fixtures.

Ruffell was born at Lambeth and was educated at Harrow School, before going up to Durham University. While studying at Durham, he made two appearances first-class cricket for Durham MCCU in 2018, against Warwickshire at Edgbaston, and Middlesex at Northwood. Across his two matches, he bowled a total of 27 wicketless overs with his right-arm medium pace bowling, conceding 96 runs. In addition to playing first-class cricket, Ruffell also played minor counties cricket for Norfolk in 2017, making a single appearance in the Minor Counties Championship.
