= Coedcae School =

Comprehensive school in Llanelli, Wales

- Ysgol Coedcae
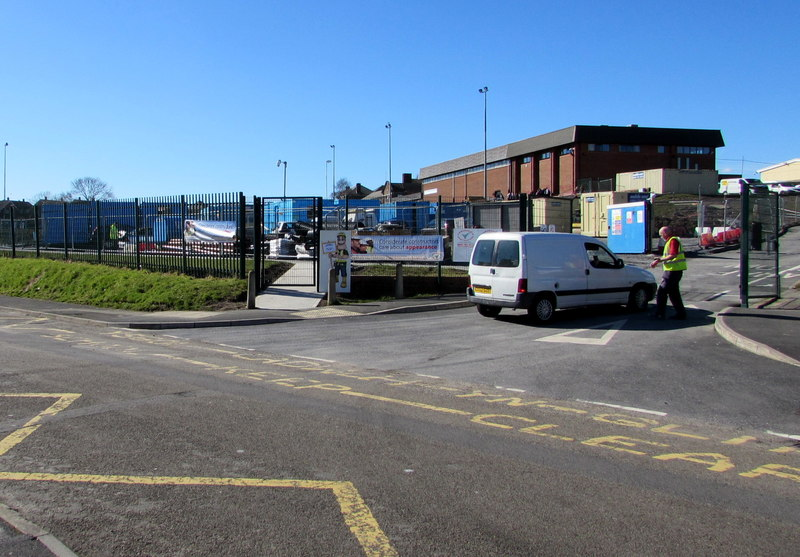
- Entrance to the school

Location
- Trostre Road; Llanelli, Carmarthenshire, SA15 1LJ; Wales; 51.6793°N 4.1457°W

Information
- Type: Comprehensive
- Motto: I'r gorau, ein gorau 'To the best, Our best'
- Established: 1900
- Head teacher: Tracy Senchal
- Enrollment: 880
- Website: www.coedcae.org.uk

Coedcae School (Welsh: Ysgol Coedcae) is a comprehensive school in Llanelli, Wales. As of 2020 it has 880 pupils, aged from 11 to 16 years old. The school uniform is black trousers, white shirt and red and silver tie (Purple and silver for senior pupils) and a black jumper with the school logo. The current head teacher is Tracy Senchal, the school has around 70 teachers.

Coedcae was placed in school quality group 2, 1 being excellent and 5 being poor.

Notable past students include the cricketer Simon Jones and the athlete Dai Greene. The 2011/2012 school year marked the end of deputy headmaster, Mr Robert Davies', 37 year teaching career as he retired.

2013 saw Coedcae getting a 48% pass rate at GCSEs grade A-C, decreasing in 2014 to a 39% pass rate. This was a drastic improvement from the 49% pass rate in the school year 2010/2011.

== Notable alumni ==
- Scott Phillips, cricketer
