= Harry Allen (cricketer) =

English cricketer (born 1996)

Personal information
- Born: 25 March 1996 (age 30)
- Source: Cricinfo, 1 April 2018

Harry Allen (born 25 March 1996) is an English cricketer. He made his first-class debut on 1 April 2018 for Cardiff MCCU against Gloucestershire as part of the Marylebone Cricket Club University fixtures.
