= Matthew Plater =

English cricketer (born 1995)

Personal information
- Born: 1 October 1995 (age 31)
- Source: Cricinfo, 1 April 2018

Matthew Plater (born 1 October 1995) is an English cricketer. He made his first-class debut on 1 April 2018 for Durham MCCU against Warwickshire as part of the Marylebone Cricket Club University fixtures.
