= Tim Rouse =

English cricketer (born 1996)

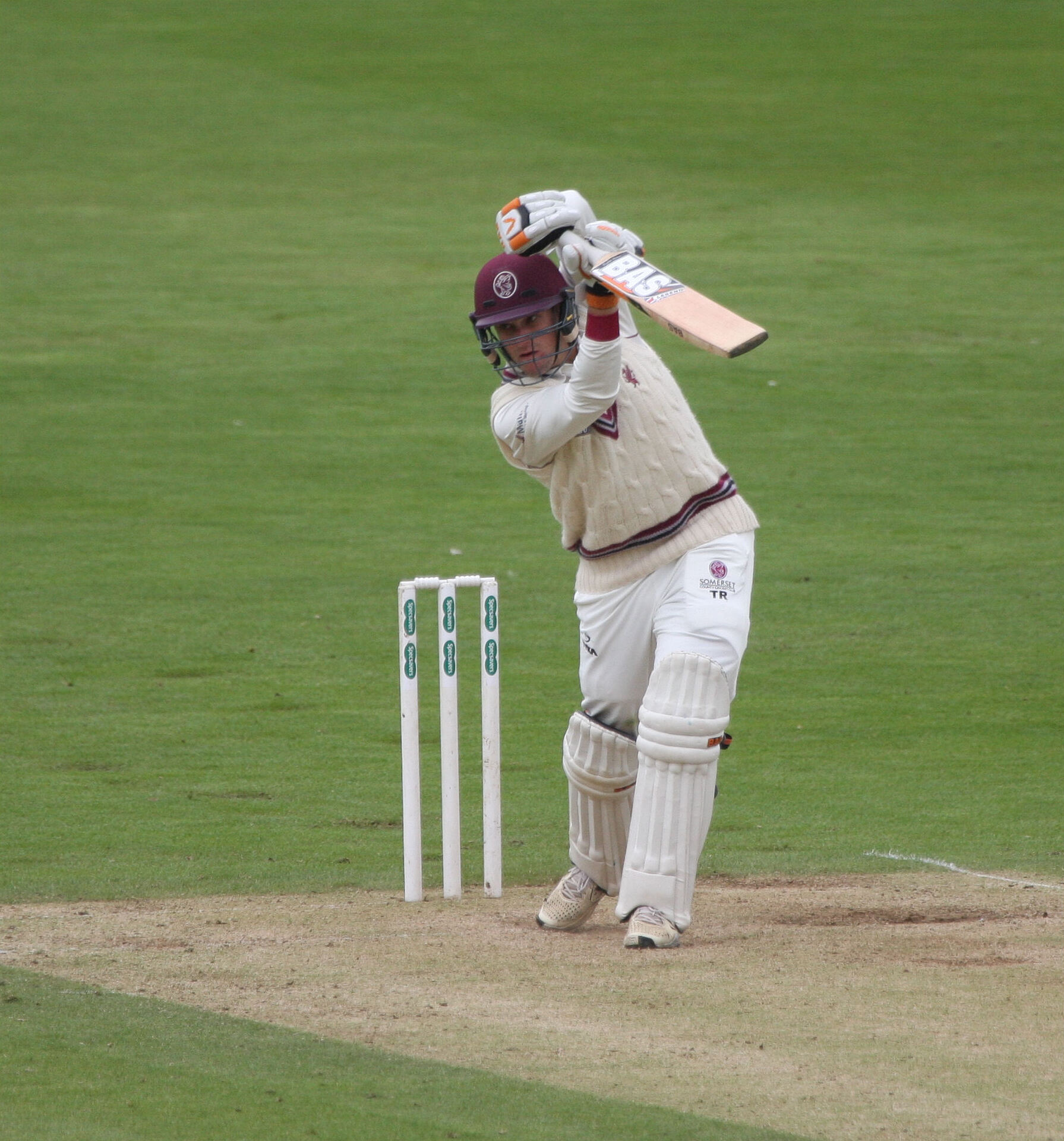
- Rouse in 2017

Personal information
- Full name: Timothy David Rouse
- Born: 9 April 1996 (age 30); Sheffield, Yorkshire, England
- Batting: Right-handed
- Bowling: Right-arm off break
- Role: Top order batsman
- Relatives: Harry Rouse (brother)

Domestic team information
- Years: Team
- 2015–2017: Cardiff MCCU
- 2015–2019: Somerset (squad no. 44)
- First-class debut: 2 April 2015 Cardiff MCCU v Glamorgan
- Last First-class: 28 August 2017 Somerset v Essex
- Only Twenty20: 15 July 2016 Somerset v Middlesex

Career statistics
Competition	FC	T20
Matches	9	1
Runs scored	205	9
Batting average	17.08	9.00
100s/50s	0/1	0/0
Top score	69	9
Balls bowled	228	–
Wickets	5	–
Bowling average	37.00	–
5 wickets in innings	0	–
10 wickets in match	0	n/a
Best bowling	2/31	–
Catches/stumpings	5/–	1/–
- Source: CricketArchive, 31 August 2017

Timothy David Rouse (born 9 April 1996) is an English cricketer who most recently played for Somerset County Cricket Club. A top order right-handed batsman, he also bowls right-arm off spin. He made his first-class debut for Cardiff MCC University against Glamorgan in April 2015. In September 2014, Rouse graduated from the Somerset academy and, along with Sam Wyatt-Haines and Ollie Sale, was granted a SCCC Scholarship for the summer.
