= Radyr Comprehensive School =

- Ysgol Gyfun Radur

Location
- Heol Isaf; Radyr, Cardiff, CF15 8XG; Wales; 51°30′33.38″N 03°14′52.60″W

Information
- Type: Comprehensive
- Established: 1972
- Chair of Governors: David Silver
- Head teacher: Andrew Williams
- Gender: Mixed
- Age range: 11–18
- Enrolment: 2018
- Website: www.radyr.cardiff.sch.uk

Radyr Comprehensive School (Welsh: Ysgol Gyfun Radur) is an 11–18 mixed comprehensive school and sixth form college in Radyr, Cardiff, Wales that was established in 1972. The current roll is around 1,295 students, with around 280 of those in the sixth form.

The school is controlled by the Cardiff Education Authority. For the 2000–01 school year, demand for places from parents exceeded supply.

As of February 2024, 14.3% of pupils are eligible for free school meals, which is nearly 7% less than the national average.

== History ==
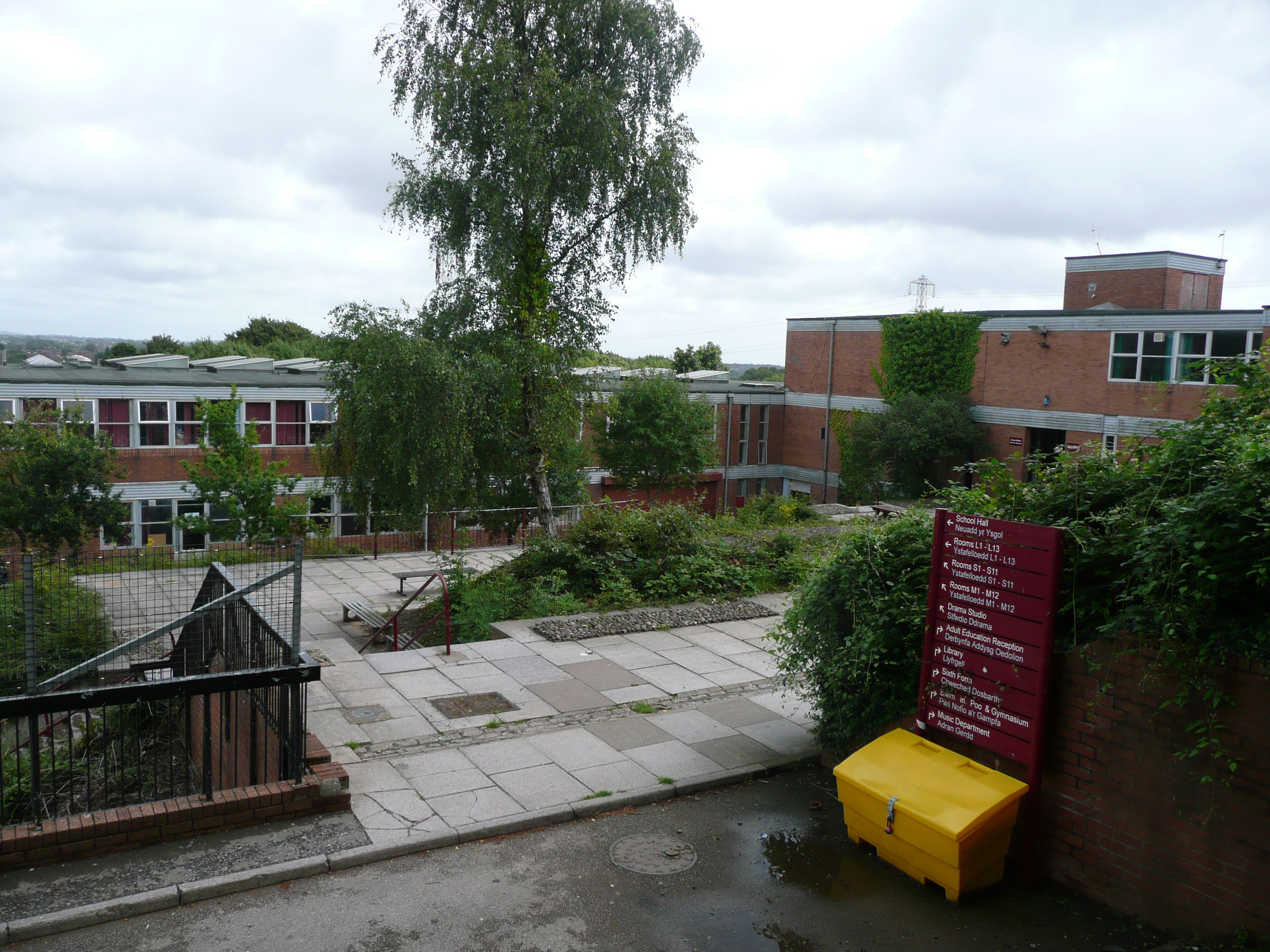
A view of the school

Prior to 1968, the majority of children from Radyr travelled nine miles to Penarth County Grammar School and St Cyres Secondary Modern School in Penarth by steam train daily, a quicker and easier option than road journeys to closer Cardiff secondary schools. The arrangement ceased when the direct rail route was closed by the Beeching Axe. The new Radyr Comprehensive School opened in 1972. In 2004, a new state-of-the-art sports hall, including a fitness suite, was built for the school.

In June 2007, the school site was said to be worth £25m, and it was reported by the South Wales Echo that Cardiff Council were considering plans to close the school as part of a reorganisation.

The school was criticised, in February 2008, after pupils aged 13 were instructed by a teacher to write imaginary suicide notes for an English lesson in order to "get into the mind of a troubled teenager". This was part of a study of the non-curriculum novel Noughts and Crosses by Malorie Blackman. However, the school is just a few miles from Bridgend where there had been multiple teenage suicides. The headmaster of the school stated that "the task was a 'spontaneous piece of writing' where children were asked not to turn over the page to find out what the letter said - but to write their own version of the suicide note" and "the teacher setting the text did not associate the task with news stories but considered it part of the textual study of a serious book dealing with serious issues in a serious way". Several relatives of the recently deceased Bridgend teenagers expressed their sorrow and regret that the unsuitable subject featured in a school project for such young children.

In September 2016, the school was subject to scrutiny following media coverage of 30 year old IT teacher Richard Shore's 'sexually motivated' relationship with a 17-year-old student. At a hearing, he denied having sex with the student and the CPS decided to take no further action. However, at his disciplinary hearing, Shore was found to be 'unfit to practice' due to seven cases of 'inappropriate behaviour' with the student, including inviting the student to his home and buying them gifts. Radyr Comprehensive suspended Shore prior to the hearing and ultimately the Fitness to Practise Committee removed Shore from the teaching register indefinitely. The relationship was alleged to begin on a 2014 school trip to California and a colleague in the IT department, Richard Edmunds, stated that his 'suspicions were raised' after the pair allegedly went jogging alone together on the trip.

In 2019, the school was named 'Welsh State School of the Year' in the Sunday Times Schools Guide.

However, in December 2020 a member of the school's IT department, Richard Edmunds (see above), was sentenced to 6 years and 3 months in Newport's Crown Court for grooming female students to obtain indecent photographs. Edmunds pled guilty to 19 offences and his computer was found to contain thousands of indecent photos and films of children. Nearly 100 of these were in Category A, the most serious category of child pornography. The court heard that the grooming had spanned 4 years, and that Edmunds had been arrested following a safeguarding report from Childline.

In June 2021, Radyr Comprehensive School was one of 2962 primary and secondary schools across the UK named in Everyone's Invited 2021 report. The report aims to raise awareness of rape culture in education and all of the institutions listed were named in testimonials submitted by survivors.

== Academic performance ==
The proportion of pupils who achieved five or more grades A* to C in the 2003 GCSE examinations was above the national average, whilst the proportion of students achieving A level success at grades A to C in 2 or more subjects was below the national average.

In the Estyn inspection in April 2004, the standards reached in Religious Education at Key Stage 4 were considered unsatisfactory, but the remaining assessments ranged between satisfactory and very good, with notable performances in Art, Music, and Physical Education.

Following the 2016 Estyn inspection, Radyr Comprehensive was placed on the list of schools requiring Estyn review as the schools' prospects for improvement were deemed 'adequate'. It was judged to have made sufficient progress by the following year, and was removed from the list in November 2017. Radyr Comprehensive was most recently inspected in February 2024. Estyn no longer provides headline rankings, however the 2024 inspection can be judged as more successful if going by the 2 recommendations put forwards in 2024, compared to the 5 action points of 2016.

== Sporting activities ==
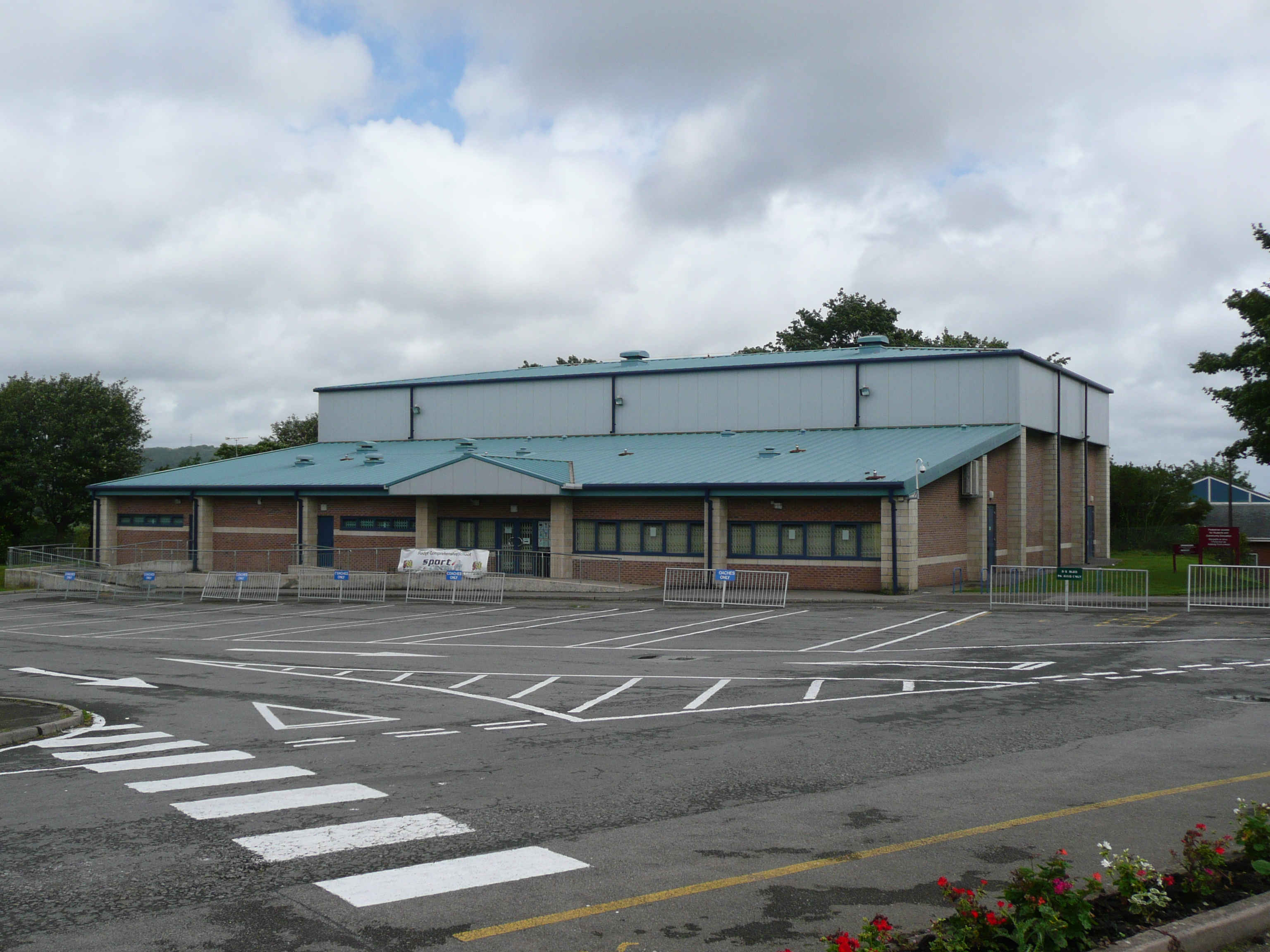
The new sports hall

The girls' hockey team won the 2002 RAF Careers under-18 Schools Hockey Champions with a win over Chepstow School.

In the Wales Region Hard Track Cycling Championships held in July 2006, a pupil won the under-14 Girls' Omnium.

== Extra-curricular activities ==
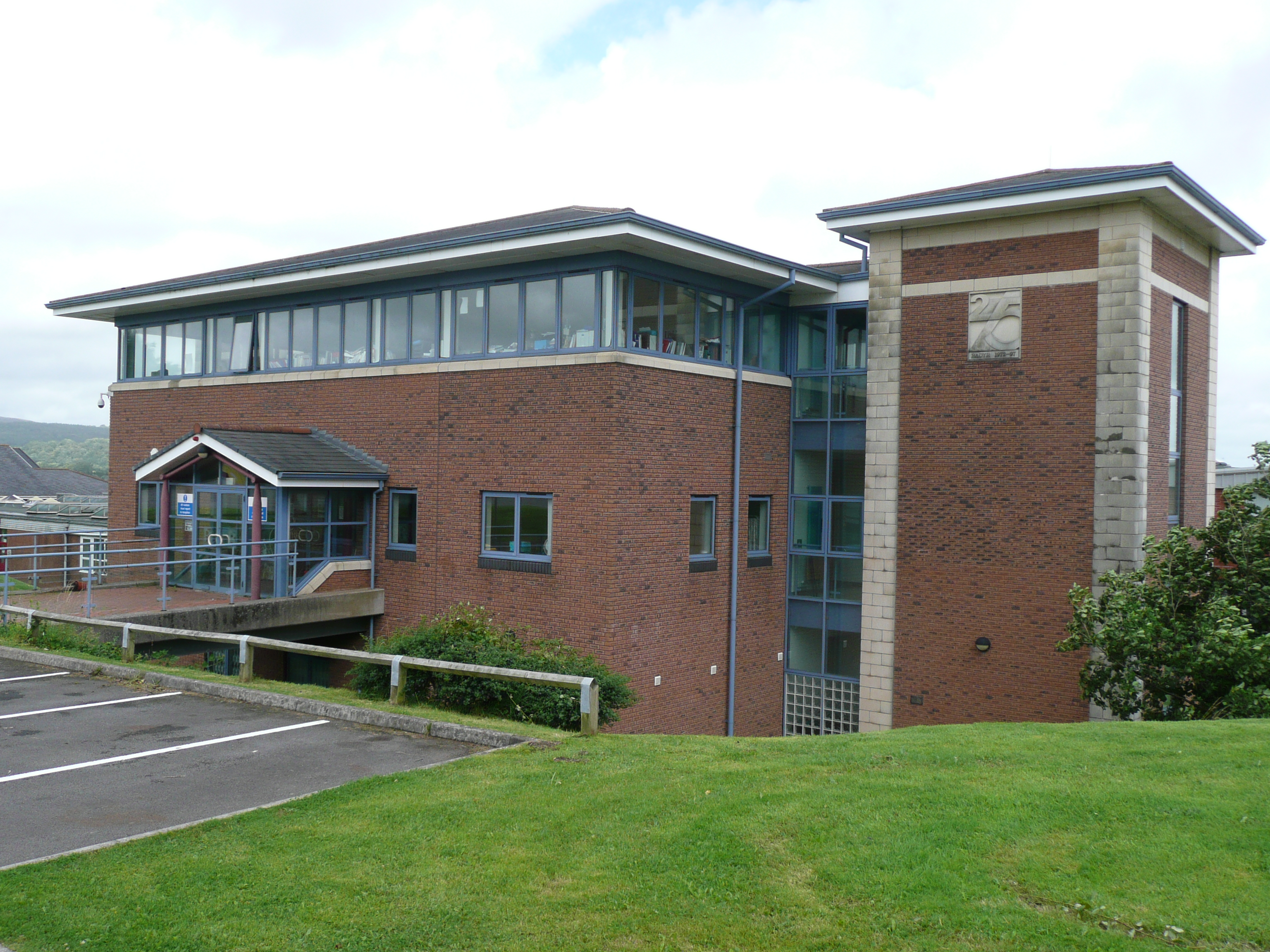
School reception

The School's Big Band was invited to entertain guests at Disneyland Paris in October 2006 and on 1 March 2007. The Band continued touring, and headed to Chicago in August 2008.,

== Notable former pupils from the school ==
- Nickie Aiken, Conservative MP
- Timothy Benjamin, runner.
- Gareth Bennett, UKIP Member of the National Assembly for Wales
- Emily Burnett, actor
- Carole Cadwalladr, British journalist and author
- Paul Duddridge, film director/producer/writer.
- Greg Holmes, cricketer
- Lucie Jones, actress, model and X Factor UK 2009 final twelve contestant and singer.
- Jann Mardenborough, racing driver
- Tom Maynard, late professional cricketer.
- Jimi Mistry, Actor, known for roles on Coronation Street, EastEnders, The Guru and East Is East.
- Tom Lockyer, professional footballer.
- Ella Powell, professional footballer
- Harry Robinson, professional rugby player.
