= Scott Phillips (cricketer) =

Welsh cricketer

Personal information
- Full name: David Scott Phillips
- Born: 31 March 1994 (age 32); Swansea, Glamorgan, Wales
- Batting: Right-handed
- Bowling: Right-arm fast-medium

Domestic team information
- Years: Team
- 2012: Wales Minor Counties
- 2013: Cardiff MCCU

Career statistics
Competition	First-class
Matches	1
Runs scored	7
Batting average	7.00
100s/50s	–/–
Top score	7
Catches/stumpings	–/–
- Source: Cricinfo, 4 August 2020

David Scott Phillips (born 31 March 1994) is a Welsh former first-class cricketer.

Phillips was born at Swansea in March 1994. He was educated at Coedcae School, before going up to Cardiff Metropolitan University. While studying at Cardiff, he made a single appearance in first-class cricket for Cardiff MCCU against Glamorgan at Sophia Gardens in 2013. taking the wickets of Will Bragg and Stewart Walters in the Glamorgan first innings, in addition to scoring 7 runs from the tail in the Cardiff first innings. In addition to playing first-class cricket, Phillips also played minor counties cricket for Wales Minor Counties in 2012, making four appearances in the Minor Counties Championship.
