= Yuvraj Odedra =

English cricketer

Personal information
- Full name: Yuvraj Jiva Odedra
- Born: November 1997 (age 29); Leicester, Leicestershire, England
- Batting: Right-handed
- Bowling: Unknown

Domestic team information
- Years: Team
- 2018: Wales Minor Counties
- 2019: Cardiff MCCU

Career statistics
Competition	First-class
Matches	1
Runs scored	4
Batting average	2.00
100s/50s	–/–
Top score	4
Balls bowled	126
Wickets	2
Bowling average	47.50
5 wickets in innings	–
10 wickets in match	–
Best bowling	1/41
Catches/stumpings	–/–
- Source: Cricinfo, 5 August 2020

Yuvraj Jiva Odedra (born November 1997) is an English former first-class cricketer.

Odedra was born at Leicester in November 1997. He was educated in Leicester at St Paul's Catholic School, before going up to Cardiff Metropolitan University. While studying at Cardiff, he made a single appearance in first-class cricket for Cardiff MCCU against Somerset at Taunton in 2019. He took two wickets in the match, dismissing Pakistan batsman Azhar Ali in both Somerset innings. In addition to playing first-class cricket, Odedra also played minor counties cricket for Wales Minor Counties in 2018, making a single appearance in the Minor Counties Championship.
