= Bradley Scriven =

English cricketer

Personal information
- Full name: Bradley Richard Montague Scriven
- Born: 8 December 1993 (age 32); High Wycombe, Buckinghamshire, England
- Batting: Right-handed
- Bowling: Right-arm medium

Domestic team information
- Years: Team
- 2014–2016: Cardiff MCCU

Career statistics
Competition	First-class
Matches	5
Runs scored	172
Batting average	34.40
100s/50s	–/1
Top score	67*
Catches/stumpings	–/–
- Source: Cricinfo, 4 August 2020

Bradley Richard Montague Scriven (born 8 December 1993) is an English former first-class cricketer.

Scriven was born at High Wycombe in December 1993. He was educated at Cranleigh School, he went up to Cardiff Metropolitan University. While studying at Cardiff, he made five appearances in first-class cricket for Cardiff MCCU from 2014 to 2016. Scriven scored 172 runs in his five matches, at an average of 34.40 and a high score of 67 not out, which he made against Glamorgan in 2016.
