= Richard Southcombe =

English cricketer (1909–1995)

Richard Southcombe (22 November 1909 – 3 August 1995) played first-class cricket for Somerset in 1936 and 1937. He was born at Taunton, Somerset and died at Yeovil, also in Somerset.

Southcombe was a right-handed batsman and a right-arm off-break bowler. In his two first-class matches, he batted in the middle and lower order and he did not bowl. His highest score, and half of his aggregate for first-class runs, came in his very first innings, with a score of 10 in the match against Worcestershire at Yeovil in 1936.
