= Brian Adams (footballer) =

English footballer (born 1947)

Personal information
- Full name: Brian Thomas Adams
- Date of birth: 18 May 1947 (age 79)
- Place of birth: Tottenham, England
- Position: Midfielder

Youth career
- Chelsea

Senior career*
| Years | Team | Apps | (Gls) |
| 1964–1966 | Millwall | 15 | (0) |
| 1966–1967 | Wimbledon | 7 | (1) |
| Total | | 22 | (1) |
- * Club domestic league appearances and goals

Brian Thomas Adams (born 18 May 1947) is an English former footballer who played as a midfielder in the Football League for Millwall. He began his senior career with Chelsea, without playing for them in the League, and went on to play non-league football for Wimbledon.
