= Ryan Adams (cricketer) =

English cricketer

Personal information
- Full name: Ryan James Adams
- Born: 11 March 1993 (age 33); Gloucestershire, England
- Batting: Right-handed

Domestic team information
- Years: Team
- 2014: Cardiff MCCU
- Only First-class: 1 April 2014 Cardiff MCCU v Glamorgan

Career statistics
Competition	FC
Matches	1
Runs scored	0
Batting average	–
100s/50s	0/0
Top score	0*
Balls bowled	120
Wickets	0
Bowling average	–
5 wickets in innings	–
10 wickets in match	–
Best bowling	–
Catches/stumpings	2/–
- Source: ESPNcricinfo, 7 September 2016

Ryan James Adams (born 11 March 1993) is an English first-class cricketer. He is a right handed batsman. He made his first-class debut for Cardiff MCCU against Glamorgan.
