= Bryan Adams (disambiguation) =

Bryan Adams (born 1959) is a Canadian singer-songwriter and photographer.

Bryan Adams may also refer to:

- Bryan Adams (album), his self-titled debut album
- Bryan Adams (ice hockey) (born 1977), Canadian professional ice hockey player in the National Hockey League
- Bryan Adams (politician) (born 1962), Louisiana politician
- Bryan Adams High School, public secondary school located in East Dallas, Texas

== See also ==
- Brian Adams (disambiguation)
- Ryan Adams (born 1974), American rock/country singer
