= Sean Griffiths =

Welsh cricketer (born 1995)

Personal information
- Full name: Sean William Griffiths
- Born: 16 May 1995 (age 31); Neath, Wales
- Batting: Right-handed
- Bowling: Right-arm medium
- Source: ESPNcricinfo, 7 September 2016

Sean Griffiths (born 16 May 1995) is a Welsh first-class cricketer. He is a right-handed batsman and a right-arm medium fast bowler. He made his first-class debut Cardiff MCCU against Glamorgan on 1 April 2014.
