= Alex Milton =

English cricketer (born 1996)

Personal information
- Full name: Alexander Geoffrey Milton
- Born: 19 May 1996 (age 30); Redhill, Surrey, England
- Batting: Right-handed
- Bowling: Right-arm leg break
- Role: Wicket-keeper

Domestic team information
- Years: Team
- 2016–2018: Cardiff MCCU
- 2018–2021: Worcestershire (squad no. 12)
- First-class debut: 4 April 2016; Cardiff MCCU v Hampshire
- Only List A: 19 June 2018; Worcestershire v West Indies A

Career statistics
Competition	FC	LA
Matches	14	1
Runs scored	358	0
Batting average	17.90	0.00
100s/50s	1/1	0/0
Top score	104*	0
Catches/stumpings	12/1	0/0
- Source: ESPNcricinfo, 1 October 2019

Alexander Geoffrey Milton (born 19 May 1996) is an English cricketer. Milton attended Malvern College. He made his first-class debut on 4 April 2016 for Cardiff MCCU against Hampshire as part of the Marylebone Cricket Club University fixtures.

In September 2017, Milton signed his first professional contract with Worcestershire County Cricket Club ahead of the 2018 season. In October 2018, Milton signed a three-year extension on his professional contract, confirming he will be staying at Worcestershire until 2021.

He made his List A debut for Worcestershire against the West Indies A in a tri-series warm-up match on 19 June 2018.
