= Mungo Russell =

English cricketer (born 1998)

Personal information
- Full name: Alexander Mungo Comine Russell
- Born: 24 May 1998 (age 28)
- Batting: Right-handed
- Bowling: Right-arm medium-fast
- Role: Bowler
- Source: Cricinfo, 1 April 2018

Alexander Mungo Comine Russell (born 24 May 1998) is an English cricketer.

He made his first-class debut on 1 April 2018 for Durham MCCU against Warwickshire as part of the Marylebone Cricket Club University fixtures. In June 2020 he received a half palatinate from Team Durham for his cricketing activities as a student.
