= Knowle Cricket Club Ground =

Cricket ground in Bristol, England

Coordinates: 51.43311°N 2.56729°W

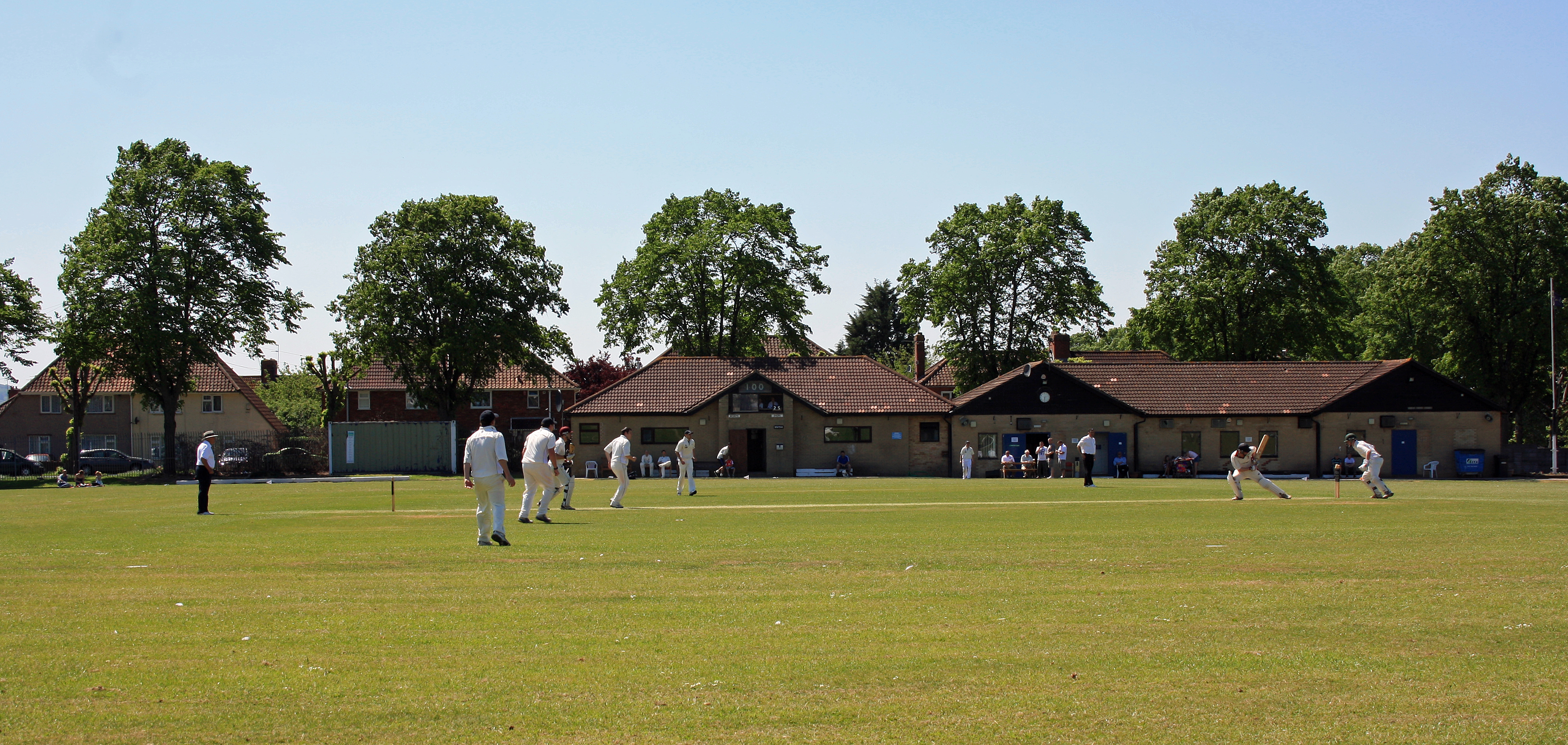

Ground information
- Location: Bristol
- Establishment: 1894 (first recorded match)

Team information
Somerset	(1926-1928)
- As of 30 August 2010; Source: Ground profile

Knowle Cricket Club Ground is a cricket ground in Bristol. The first recorded match on the ground was in 1894, when Knowle played Frenchay. In 1926 the ground held its first first-class match when Somerset played Hampshire in the County Championship. The following season the ground held a further first-class match when Somerset played Worcestershire. The final first-class match held at the ground came in 1928 when Somerset played Essex.

Still in use to this day, the ground is the home venue of Knowle Cricket Club.
