= James Seward (cricketer) =

English cricketer (born 1997)

Personal information
- Born: 4 September 1997 (age 29)
- Source: Cricinfo, 1 April 2018

James Seward (born 4 September 1997) is an English cricketer. He made his first-class debut on 1 April 2018 for Oxford MCCU against Kent as part of the Marylebone Cricket Club University fixtures.
