= Oliver Pike (cricketer) =

Welsh cricketer (born 1998)

Personal information
- Full name: Oliver Lee Pike
- Born: 2 April 1998 (age 28); Bridgend, Wales
- Batting: Right-handed
- Bowling: Right-arm fast-medium
- Role: Bowler

Domestic team information
- Years: Team
- 2015–2018: Wales Minor Counties
- 2017–2018: Cardiff MCCU
- First-class debut: 28 March 2017 Cardiff MCCU v Glamorgan

Career statistics
Competition	First-class
Matches	3
Runs scored	0
Batting average	–
100s/50s	–/–
Top score	0*
Balls bowled	320
Wickets	5
Bowling average	44.00
5 wickets in innings	–
10 wickets in match	–
Best bowling	3/82
Catches/stumpings	–/–
- Source: Cricinfo, 24 June 2025

Oliver Pike (born 2 April 1998) is a Welsh cricketer. He made his first-class debut on 28 March 2017 for Cardiff MCCU against Glamorgan as part of the Marylebone Cricket Club University fixtures.

== Personal life ==
He is the cousin of Welsh footballer Gareth Bale and the son of former Cardiff City footballer Chris Pike.
