= James Turpin (cricketer) =

English cricketer (born 1997)

James Ross Turpin
Personal information
- Full name: James Ross Turpin
- Born: 18 March 1997 (age 29); Fowey, Cornwall, England
- Batting: Right-handed
- Bowling: Right-arm medium

Domestic team information
- Years: Team
- 2016–2018: Cardiff MCCU

Career statistics
Competition	First-class
Matches	4
Runs scored	5
Batting average	5.00
100s/50s	0/0
Top score	5
Balls bowled	386
Wickets	6
Bowling average	46.83
5 wickets in innings	0
10 wickets in match	0
Best bowling	2/44
Catches/stumpings	1/–
- Source: ESPNcricinfo, 30 March 2020

James Ross Turpin (born 18 March 1997) is an English cricketer. Turpin is a right-arm medium bowler and right-handed batsman. He was born in Fowey, Cornwall, England.

Turpin made his first-class debut for Cardiff MCCU against Hampshire in April 2016.
