= Westlands Sports Ground, Yeovil =

Cricket ground in Yeovil, England

Coordinates: 50.942°N 2.649°W

Westlands Sports Ground
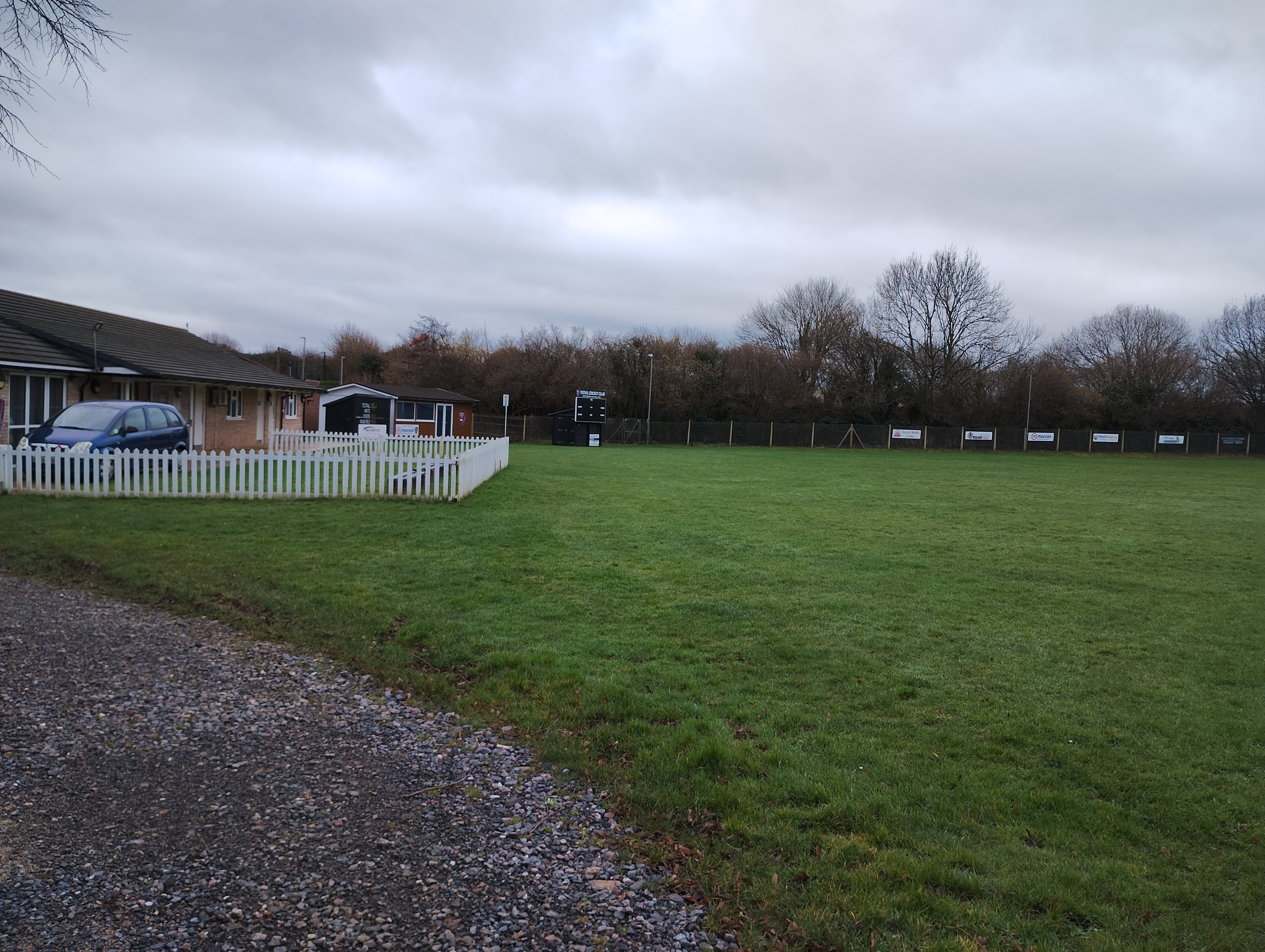

Ground information
- Location: Yeovil, Somerset
- Establishment: 1944

Team information
Westlands Sports Club	(1944–present)
Somerset	(1971–1991)
- As of 23 August 2010; Source: CricketArchive

Westlands Sports Ground is a former List A cricket ground located in Yeovil, Somerset. The ground is home to Westlands Sports Club, originally formed from employees of Westland Aircraft. Between 1971 and 1978, the ground hosted annual Somerset County Cricket Club matches in late May or early June. In later years, the club has used the ground for Second XI and youth cricket.
