= Johnson Park, Yeovil =

Multi-purpose sports ground

Coordinates: 50°57′19″N 2°39′08″W

Johnson Park is a multi-purpose sports ground on the northern outskirts of Yeovil, Somerset and is home to the Yeovil Sports and Social Club. The main website can be found at: www.yeovilsportsclub.co.uk. Between 1951 and 1967, Somerset County Cricket Club played 12 first-class cricket matches on the ground, and Somerset also played two List A matches there, one each in 1969 and 1970. The ground was named after Stanley Johnson, a local benefactor, who donated the field for use by the community for sports purposes in 1948. Johnson Park is still, technically, the home of Yeovil Cricket Club although the team actually disbanded a number of years ago. For many years Johnson Park was also home to Yeovil Rugby Club who moved to new premises at Yeovil Showground and established the Ivel Barbarians rugby team in the 1990s. Johnson Park is currently home to Yeovil Tennis Club www.yeoviltennisclub.co.uk, Pen Mill Football Club and Yeo Bowmen Archery Club. It is also the base for a number of other organisations (sporting and social) and has a thriving social element.
