= Taunton Vale Sports Club Ground =

Sports club located in Taunton, England

Coordinates: 51°01′55″N 3°07′00″W

Taunton Vale Sports Club
- TVSC
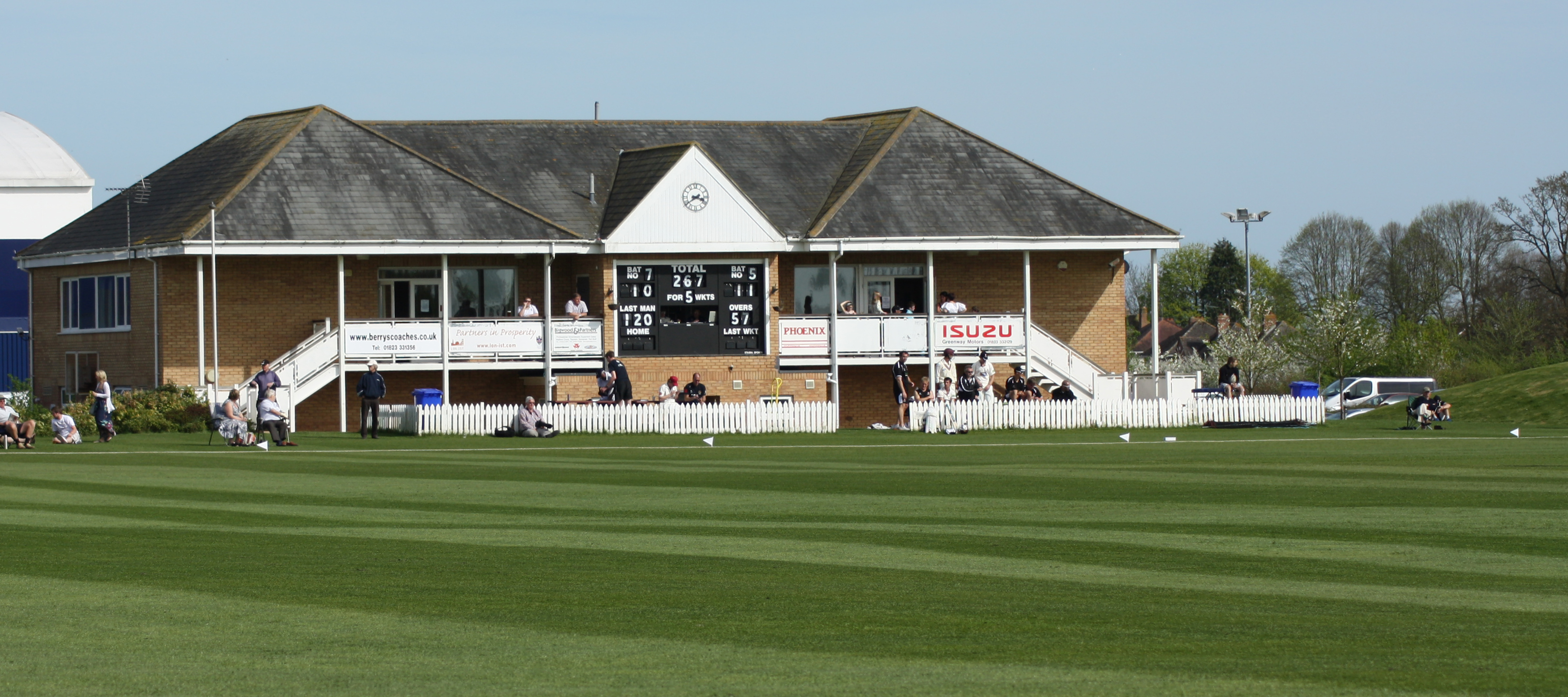

Ground information
- Location: Staplegrove, Taunton, Somerset
- Establishment: 2001

International information
- Only WT20I: 26 June 2011: Australia v New Zealand

Team information
| Taunton Cricket Club | (2002–present) |
| Somerset Second XI | (2004–present) |
| Somerset v MCCUs | (2005–present) |
- As of 5 September 2020; Source: CricketArchive

Taunton Vale Sports Club (usually referred to as "Taunton Vale", "Vale" or "TVSC") is a multi use community sports club located in Taunton, Somerset. Taunton Vale HC, Taunton Cricket and Taunton Vale Tennis Club are the resident sports clubs. It is also the regular home venue of both Somerset County Cricket Club's Second XI, Somerset CCC also holding many of their games against MCC Universities teams at the ground, which have so far included two first-class matches, in 2012 and 2015.

The sports club has two county standard cricket fields and a pavilion, a sand dressed hockey ATP, a 3G pitch, 4 netball/tennis hard courts and a multi use sports hall. The first LED sports lighting installation in the UK was installed on this site in 2014, providing competition level lighting across all artificial pitches and courts.

== First-class cricket ==
Somerset County Cricket Club hosted the inaugural first-class match at the ground in a 3-day game (31 March to 2 April 2012) against Cardiff MCCU, which featured a county record partnership of 450 for the second wicket between Nick Compton and James Hildreth. The game was also the first-class debut for Cardiff MCCU.

The second first-class match at Taunton Vale took place from 2 to 4 April 2015, when Somerset played Durham MCCU.

== Women's international cricket ==
Taunton Vale hosted a single Women's Twenty20 International match in 2011, between Australia and New Zealand.

The stadium has hosted following ODI matches till date.

| Team (A) | Team (B) | Winner | Margin | Year |
|---|---|---|---|---|
| New Zealand | Australia | Australia | By 6 wickets | 2011 |

== Netball ==
Gamington Netball Club and Taunton Netball Club and Taunton Croquet Club are also tenant users.

== See also ==
- List of Somerset County Cricket Club grounds
