= Cardiff MCC University =

Student cricket team in Wales

Cardiff South Wales MCC University

Team information
- Founded: 2001

History
- First-class debut: Somerset in 2012 at Taunton Vale
- Official website: Cardiff South Wales MCCU

Cardiff South Wales MCC University, formerly Cardiff University Centre of Cricketing Excellence, commonly abbreviated to Cardiff MCCU, is one of six University Centres of Cricketing Excellence supported by the Marylebone Cricket Club (MCC). It comprises Cardiff University, the University of South Wales and Cardiff Metropolitan University.

Cardiff MCCU play three matches a year against first-class counties. For the first time, in 2012 two of these three matches were given first-class status. The first of these first-class matches was against Somerset, a regular early season fixture; it was held at Taunton Vale, additionally making it that ground's debut in holding first-class cricket.

The former Cardiff University Centre of Cricketing Excellence team did not play first-class cricket. As Cardiff Marylebone Cricket Club University, the team has played eight first-class matches from 2012 to 2015 (i.e., two per season in early April).

In March 2019, during the Marylebone Cricket Club University fixtures, Cardiff MCCU lost to Somerset by 568 runs, a record margin for a first-class match in England.

== See also ==
- List of Cardiff MCCU players
