= Glamorgan County Cricket Club in 2019 =

Welsh cricket club season

Glamorgan County Cricket Club
2019 season
- Coach: (Wales) Matthew Maynard (interim)
- Captain: (South Africa) Chris Cooke (South Africa) Colin Ingram (T20 Blast)
- Overseas player: (Australia) Marnus Labuschagne (11 April – 16 July) (Australia) Shaun Marsh (11–30 August) (Pakistan) Fakhar Zaman (T20 Blast) (Cricket West Indies) Kraigg Brathwaite (10–26 September)
- Ground(s): Sophia Gardens, Cardiff; Spytty Park, Newport; St Helen's, Swansea; Penrhyn Avenue, Rhos-on-Sea
- County Championship: 4th, Division Two
- One-Day Cup: 6th, South Group
- T20 Blast: 9th, South Group
- Most runs: FC: Marnus Labuschagne (1,114); LA: Billy Root (386); T20: David Lloyd (358)
- Most wickets: FC: Michael Hogan (46); LA: Marchant de Lange (16); T20: Andrew Salter (14)
- Most catches: FC: David Lloyd (16); LA: Four players (4); T20: Billy Root (6)
- Most wicket-keeping dismissals: FC: Tom Cullen (29 ct + 0 st); LA: Chris Cooke (7 ct + 2 st); T20: Chris Cooke (9 ct + 1 st)

The 2019 season was Glamorgan County Cricket Club's 132nd year in existence and their 99th as a first-class cricket county. They played most of their home matches at Sophia Gardens in Cardiff, but also played matches at outgrounds in Newport (Spytty Park), Swansea (St Helen's) and Rhos-on-Sea (Penrhyn Avenue). They finished fourth in Division Two of the County Championship, 15 points behind Gloucestershire in the last of three promotion places; they also finished sixth in the South Group of the One-Day Cup and bottom of the South Group in the T20 Blast.

The team was led by Matthew Maynard, serving as interim head coach after the departure of Robert Croft at the end of the previous season. Wicketkeeper-batsman Chris Cooke captained the side in the County Championship and the One-Day Cup, taking over from Michael Hogan and Colin Ingram, respectively. Ingram stood down from the role after being bought by Delhi Capitals for the 2019 Indian Premier League, which meant he would be unavailable for the entire One-Day Cup campaign.

Australian batter Shaun Marsh returned for a second season as Glamorgan's overseas player in all three formats; he was due to link up with Glamorgan after the 2019 Cricket World Cup, but suffered a broken arm during the tournament, ruling him out until August. With Marsh on international duty and then with his injury, Glamorgan signed fellow Australian batter Marnus Labuschagne for the first half of the season; in November 2019, he signed a two-year contract to return to Glamorgan in 2020 and 2021. Marsh's brother Mitchell also signed to play for Glamorgan in the T20 Blast, but was ruled out after being picked by Australia for the 2019 Ashes series. Glamorgan considered bringing in fellow Australian all-rounder Marcus Stoinis for the Blast, but ultimately did not sign him. That left Pakistan opening batter Fakhar Zaman as Glamorgan's only overseas player for the competition, signing him for the first eight games before the return of Shaun Marsh. West Indies batter Kraigg Brathwaite joined for the last three games of the Championship season after Shaun Marsh returned to Western Australia for pre-season. In August, Glamorgan signed Nottinghamshire all-rounder Samit Patel on loan for the last four County Championship matches. Welsh batter Aneurin Donald left Glamorgan for Hampshire on a permanent basis for the 2019 season, after spending the last month of 2018 on loan there, while Australian opener Joe Burns left for Lancashire after playing for Glamorgan in the 2018 T20 Blast. Batter Jack Murphy was forced to retire at the age of 23 in June 2019 due to a knee injury.

== Pre-season and friendlies ==
=== MCC University Match: Glamorgan v Cardiff MCCU (5–7 April) ===
5–7 April
Scorecard

Glamorgan	v	Cardiff MCCU
253/8d (69 overs); Billy Root 108* (166); Brad Evans 4/65 (18 overs)		230 (61.5 overs); Dan Douthwaite 95 (131); Craig Meschede 3/34 (10.5 overs)
110/2d (25 overs); Nick Selman 46* (53); Kiran Carlson 1/14 (4 overs)

Match drawn
Sophia Gardens, Cardiff
Umpires: Alex Wharf and Rob White

- Glamorgan won the toss and elected to bat.

== County Championship ==
=== Standings ===
Team	Pld	W	L	T	D	A	Bat	Bowl	Ded	Pts
Lancashire (P)	14	8	0	0	6	0	34	41	0	233
Northamptonshire (P)	14	5	2	0	7	0	35	38	0	188
Gloucestershire (P)	14	5	3	0	6	0	36	36	0	182
Glamorgan	14	4	3	0	7	0	35	34	1	167
Durham	14	5	5	0	4	0	21	36	0	157
Sussex	14	4	5	0	5	0	32	35	0	156
Derbyshire	14	4	6	0	4	0	23	38	0	145
Middlesex	14	3	5	0	6	0	24	33	2	133
Worcestershire	14	3	7	0	4	0	20	37	0	125
Leicestershire	14	1	6	0	7	0	24	32	0	107

Sources: BBC Sport, ESPNcricinfo, ECB

- Lancashire were Division Two champions.
- Lancashire, Northamptonshire and Gloucestershire were promoted to Division One.
- Glamorgan were deducted one point for a slow over rate against Middlesex in July.
- Middlesex were deducted two points for a slow over rate against Lancashire in September.

=== Matches ===
==== Glamorgan v Northamptonshire (11–14 April) ====
11–14 April
Scorecard

Glamorgan	v	Northamptonshire
570/8d (125 overs); Billy Root 126 (175); Jason Holder 2/79 (21 overs)		750 (227.3 overs); Ricardo Vasconcelos 184 (317); Marnus Labuschagne 3/122 (44 overs)
70/1 (18 overs); Marnus Labuschagne 27* (28); Josh Cobb 1/21 (8 overs)

Match drawn
Sophia Gardens, Cardiff
Umpires: Neil Bainton and Ian Blackwell

- Glamorgan won the toss and elected to bat.
- Points: Glamorgan 11, Northamptonshire 11.

==== Glamorgan v Gloucestershire (14–17 May) ====
14–17 May
Scorecard

Gloucestershire	v	Glamorgan
463 (118.1 overs); James Bracey 152 (242); Marchant de Lange 4/116 (25 overs)		250 (75.1 overs); Charlie Hemphrey 60 (88); George Drissell 4/83 (22.1 overs)
137/6 (50 overs); Benny Howell 44 (69); Kieran Bull 2/42 (20 overs)		481/8d (f/o) (132 overs); Nick Selman 150 (270); David Payne 4/121 (36 overs)

Match drawn
Spytty Park, Newport
Umpires: Graham Lloyd and Russell Warren

- Gloucestershire won the toss and elected to bat.
- Chris Cooke (Glam) was unable to bat in either innings due to an injury.
- Points: Gloucestershire 13, Glamorgan 9.

==== Derbyshire v Glamorgan (19–22 May) ====
19–22 May
Scorecard

Derbyshire	v	Glamorgan
378 (104.1 overs); Luis Reece 111 (173); Lukas Carey 4/61 (21 overs)		346 (112.3 overs); Charlie Hemphrey 75 (189); Ravi Rampaul 5/94 (24.3 overs)
213 (63.5 overs); Wayne Madsen 47 (55); Daniel Douthwaite 4/48 (15 overs)		248/8 (78.5 overs); Tom Cullen 51* (88); Ravi Rampaul 3/55 (15 overs)

Glamorgan won by 2 wickets
County Ground, Derby
Umpires: Billy Taylor and Martin Saggers

- Derbyshire won the toss and elected to bat.
- Play on day 1 was reduced to 69 overs due to rain and bad light.
- Points: Glamorgan 22, Derbyshire 7.

==== Sussex v Glamorgan (27–30 May) ====
27–30 May
Scorecard

Glamorgan	v	Sussex
186 (55.2 overs); Nick Selman 76* (156); Chris Jordan 3/31 (12 overs)		420 (93.4 overs); Ben Brown 131 (190); Marnus Labuschagne 3/61 (16 overs)
466 (125.1 overs); Marnus Labuschagne 182 (244); Luke Wells 5/63 (23.1 overs)		47/1 (15 overs); Harry Finch 22* (47); Marchant de Lange 1/25 (7 overs)

Match drawn
County Ground, Hove
Umpires: David Millns and Paul Baldwin

- Glamorgan won the toss and elected to bat.
- Jared Warner (Sssx) made his first-class debut.
- Points: Sussex 13, Glamorgan 9.

==== Northamptonshire v Glamorgan (2–5 June) ====
2–5 June
Scorecard

Northamptonshire	v	Glamorgan
209 (59 overs); Adam Rossington 77 (114); Marchant de Lange 4/64 (14 overs)		547 (112.3 overs); Billy Root 229 (252); Ben Sanderson 4/27 (29 overs)
195 (63.5 overs); Ben Curran 52 (66); Michael Hogan 4/32 (16 overs)

Glamorgan won by an innings and 143 runs
County Ground, Northampton
Umpires: Tom Lungley and Nick Cook

- Toss uncontested, Glamorgan elected to field.
- Ben Sanderson (Nthnts) was unable to bat in the second innings due to an injury.
- Points: Glamorgan 24, Northamptonshire 4.

==== Glamorgan v Derbyshire (11–14 June) ====
11–14 June
Scorecard

Glamorgan	v	Derbyshire
394 (95.3 overs); Graham Wagg 100 (102); Luis Reece 3/40 (14 overs)		598/5d (131 overs); Billy Godleman 227 (327); Lukas Carey 2/99 (27 overs)
184/2 (40 overs); Marnus Labuschagne 83 (90); Alex Hughes 1/13 (8 overs)

Match drawn
St Helen's, Swansea
Umpires: Mike Burns and Russell Warren

- Toss uncontested, Derbyshire elected to field.
- Points: Derbyshire 13, Glamorgan 10.

==== Middlesex v Glamorgan (16–19 June) ====
16–19 June
Scorecard

Middlesex	v	Glamorgan
410 (117.4 overs); Paul Stirling 138 (215); Marnus Labuschagne 3/52 (11 overs)		288 (86 overs); David Lloyd 59 (122); Steven Finn 5/75 (21 overs)
125/4 (33 overs); Nick Gubbins 38 (36); Marnus Labuschagne 2/25 (6 overs)

Match drawn
Brunton Memorial Ground, Radlett
Umpires: Graham Lloyd and Neil Bainton

- Toss uncontested, Glamorgan elected to field.
- Points: Middlesex 12, Glamorgan 9.

==== Gloucestershire v Glamorgan (23–26 June) ====
23–26 June
Scorecard

Gloucestershire	v	Glamorgan
313 (96.1 overs); Chris Dent 105 (186); Michael Hogan 3/51 (25 overs)		287 (93.1 overs); Nick Selman 73 (132); Josh Shaw 3/61 (19 overs)
161 (62.2 overs); James Bracey 33 (88); Michael Hogan 4/22 (18 overs)		188/6 (42.1 overs); Marnus Labuschagne 82 (98); Josh Shaw 3/41 (10 overs)

Glamorgan won by 4 wickets
County Ground, Bristol
Umpires: Ulhas Gandhe and Rob Bailey

- Toss uncontested, Glamorgan elected to field.
- Points: Glamorgan 21, Gloucestershire 6.

==== Glamorgan v Worcestershire (30 June – 3 July) ====
30 June – 3 July
Scorecard

Glamorgan	v	Worcestershire
449 (120.5 overs); Marnus Labuschagne 106 (139); Brett D'Oliveira 7/92 (26.5 overs)		370 (128.5 overs); Brett D'Oliveira 103 (158); Michael Hogan 5/62 (29.5 overs)
246/5d (66 overs); Marnus Labuschagne 100 (113); Brett D'Oliveira 2/90 (26 overs)		143/1 (51 overs); Callum Ferguson 70* (151); Lukas Carey 1/29 (14 overs)

Match drawn
Sophia Gardens, Cardiff
Umpires: Tom Lungley and Jeff Evans

- Toss uncontested, Worcestershire elected to field.
- Points: Glamorgan 13, Worcestershire 10.

==== Glamorgan v Middlesex (13–16 July) ====
13–16 July
Scorecard

Middlesex	v	Glamorgan
384 (84.1 overs); Dawid Malan 166 (194); Lukas Carey 4/54 (16.1 overs)		171 (53.3 overs); David Lloyd 67 (95); Tom Helm 5/53 (16.3 overs)
342 (78.4 overs); Sam Robson 140* (224); Marnus Labuschagne 2/38 (6.4 overs)		299 (90.4 overs); Charlie Hemphrey 72 (254); Toby Roland-Jones 5/68 (22 overs)

Middlesex won by 256 runs
Sophia Gardens, Cardiff
Umpires: Paul Pollard and Martin Saggers

- Middlesex won the toss and elected to bat.
- Points: Middlesex 23, Glamorgan 2.

==== Glamorgan v Lancashire (18–20 August) ====
18–20 August
Scorecard

Glamorgan	v	Lancashire
257 (60.4 overs); Charlie Hemphrey 56 (132); Tom Bailey 4/50 (14 overs)		545 (127.4 overs); Dane Vilas 266 (240); Michael Hogan 2/64 (24 overs)
138 (51.1 overs); Chris Cooke 41 (56); Saqib Mahmood 3/42 (13.1 overs)

Lancashire won by an innings and 150 runs
Penrhyn Avenue, Rhos-on-Sea
Umpires: Graham Lloyd and James Middlebrook

- Glamorgan won the toss and elected to bat.
- Points: Lancashire 24, Glamorgan 4.

==== Worcestershire v Glamorgan (10–12 September) ====
10–12 September
Scorecard

Worcestershire	v	Glamorgan
205 (70 overs); Riki Wessels (45 (35); Michael Hogan 4/53 (16 overs)		193 (65.5 overs); David Lloyd 35 (101); Charlie Morris 5/73 (17.5 overs)
299 (95.2 overs); Daryl Mitchell 139 (282); Samit Patel 4/59 (31 overs)		156 (38.2 overs); Chris Cooke 45 (73); Joe Leach 2/24 (10 overs)

Worcestershire won by 155 runs
New Road, Worcester
Umpires: Neil Bainton and Jeremy Lloyds

- Toss uncontested, Glamorgan elected to field.
- Points: Worcestershire 20, Glamorgan 3.

==== Glamorgan v Leicestershire (16–19 September) ====
16–19 September
Scorecard

Glamorgan	v	Leicestershire
435 (116.4 overs); Chris Cooke 96 (92); Chris Wright 5/64 (25.4 overs)		263 (82.1 overs); Chris Wright 60 (86); Samit Patel 4/58 (26.1 overs)
251/5d (61.3 overs); Kraigg Brathwaite 103* (189); Chris Wright 2/67 (14.3 overs)		132 (70.4 overs); Harry Dearden 37 (59); Andrew Salter 3/6 (10 overs)

Glamorgan won by 291 runs
Sophia Gardens, Cardiff
Umpires: Billy Taylor and Neil Bainton

- Toss uncontested, Leicestershire elected to field.
- Points: Glamorgan 24, Leicestershire 4.

==== Durham v Glamorgan (23–26 September) ====
23–26 September
Scorecard

Durham	v	Glamorgan
262/8 (86.4 overs); BJ Watling 104* (207); Michael Hogan 4/35 (19 overs)

Match drawn
Riverside Ground, Chester-le-Street
Umpires: Peter Hartley and Neil Mallender

- Toss uncontested, Glamorgan elected to field.
- No play was possible on Day 3 and 4 due to rain.
- Solomon Bell (Durham) made his first-class debut.
- Points: Durham 7, Glamorgan 7.

== One-Day Cup ==
=== Standings ===
Pos	Team	Pld	W	L	T	NR	Ded	Pts	NRR
1	Hampshire (Note: advanced directly to the semi-finals)	8	7	1	0	0	0	14	1.020
2	Middlesex (Note: advanced to the quarter-finals)	8	6	2	0	0	0	12	0.135
3	Somerset	8	5	3	0	0	0	10	0.505
4	Gloucestershire	8	5	3	0	0	0	10	0.270
5	Sussex	8	4	4	0	0	0	8	0.013
6	Glamorgan	8	3	4	0	1	0	7	−0.298
7	Kent	8	2	5	0	1	0	5	−0.966
8	Essex	8	2	6	0	0	0	4	0.325
9	Surrey	8	1	7	0	0	0	2	−1.007

Source: Cricinfo

=== Matches ===
==== Glamorgan v Essex (17 April) ====
17 April
11:00 BST
Scorecard

Essex; 326/7 (50 overs)	v	Glamorgan; 146 (31 overs)
Varun Chopra 111 (133); Graham Wagg 2/49 (10 overs maximum)		Marchant de Lange 36 (22); Ravi Bopara 3/26 (7 overs)

Essex won by 180 runs
Sophia Gardens, Cardiff
Umpires: Jeremy Lloyds and Steve O'Shaughnessy

- Glamorgan won the toss and elected to field.
- Points: Essex 2, Glamorgan 0.

==== Hampshire v Glamorgan (19 April) ====
19 April
11:00 BST
Scorecard

Glamorgan; 292/9 (50 overs)	v	Hampshire; 293/3 (41.5 overs)
David Lloyd 68 (62); Kyle Abbott 3/47 (10 overs)		Tom Alsop 130* (115); Graham Wagg 1/23 (3 overs)

Hampshire won by 7 wickets
Rose Bowl, Southampton
Umpires: Mark Newell and Steve O'Shaughnessy

- Glamorgan won the toss and elected to bat.
- Points: Hampshire 2, Glamorgan 0.

==== Glamorgan v Somerset (21 April) ====
21 April
11:00 BST
Scorecard

Somerset; 261/9 (50 overs)	v	Glamorgan; 259 (48.1 overs)
James Hildreth 67 (76); Marchant de Lange 3/37 (10 overs)		David Lloyd 84 (93); Josh Davey 4/36 (10 overs)

Somerset won by 2 runs
Sophia Gardens, Cardiff
Umpires: Paul Pollard and Alex Wharf

- Somerset won the toss and elected to bat.
- Points: Somerset 2, Glamorgan 0.

==== Glamorgan v Kent (25 April) ====
25 April
11:00 BST
Scorecard

Glamorgan; 68/2 (15 overs)	v	Kent
Chris Cooke 29 (28); Fred Klaassen 1/9 (2 overs)

No result
Sophia Gardens, Cardiff
Umpires: Paul Pollard and Mike Burns

- Glamorgan won the toss and elected to bat.
- Rain during Glamorgan's innings prevented any further play.
- Jeremy Lawlor (Glam) made his List A debut.
- Points: Glamorgan 1, Kent 1.

==== Glamorgan v Surrey (28 April) ====
28 April
11:00 BST
Scorecard

Glamorgan; 323/7 (50 overs)	v	Surrey; 259 (46.4 overs)
Billy Root 113* (115); Morné Morkel 3/47 (10 overs)		Jordan Clark 79 (82); Marchant de Lange 4/63 (10 overs)

Glamorgan won by 64 runs
Sophia Gardens, Cardiff
Umpires: Jeff Evans and Russell Warren

- Surrey won the toss and elected to field.
- Points: Glamorgan 2, Surrey 0.

==== Gloucestershire v Glamorgan (30 April) ====
30 April
11:00 BST
Scorecard

Glamorgan; 331/7 (50 overs)	v	Gloucestershire; 257 (48.3 overs)
Chris Cooke 161 (127); Benny Howell 3/83 (10 overs)		Jack Taylor 75 (70); Marchant de Lange 3/41 (9 overs)

Glamorgan won by 74 runs
County Ground, Bristol
Umpires: Richard Illingworth and Alex Wharf

- Glamorgan won the toss and elected to bat.
- Points: Glamorgan 2, Gloucestershire 0.

==== Middlesex v Glamorgan (5 May) ====
5 May
11:00 BST
Scorecard

Glamorgan; 285 (49.4 overs)	v	Middlesex; 289/5 (47.3 overs)
Charlie Hemphrey 87 (81); Nathan Sowter 4/58 (10 overs)		Nick Gubbins 92 (91); Billy Root 2/36 (6 overs)

Middlesex won by 5 wickets
Lord's, London
Umpires: Peter Hartley and Steve O'Shaughnessy

- Middlesex won the toss and elected to field.
- Points: Middlesex 2, Glamorgan 0.

==== Sussex v Glamorgan (7 May) ====
7 May
13:00 BST (D/N)
Scorecard

Sussex; 347/7 (50 overs)	v	Glamorgan; 348/8 (48.4 overs)
Laurie Evans 110 (87); Marchant de Lange 3/74 (10 overs)		Billy Root 78 (66); Danny Briggs 2/61 (10 overs)

Glamorgan won by 2 wickets
County Ground, Hove
Umpires: Nick Cook and Ian Blackwell
Player of the match: Dan Douthwaite (Glam)

- Sussex won the toss and elected to bat.
- Roman Walker (Glam) made his List A debut.
- Points: Glamorgan 2, Sussex 0.

== T20 Blast ==
=== Standings ===
Pos	Team	Pld	W	L	T	NR	Ded	Pts	NRR
1	Sussex Sharks	14	8	3	1	2	0	19	0.803
2	Gloucestershire	14	7	3	1	3	0	18	0.242
3	Middlesex	14	7	6	0	1	0	15	0.216
4	Essex Eagles	14	5	4	1	4	0	15	−0.464
5	Kent Spitfires	14	6	6	0	2	0	14	0.000
6	Somerset	14	6	7	0	1	0	13	0.448
7	Hampshire	14	5	6	1	2	0	13	0.021
8	Surrey	14	5	7	1	1	0	12	−0.246
9	Glamorgan	14	1	8	1	4	0	7	−1.381

Source: Cricinfo

Advance to quarter-finals

=== Matches ===
==== Glamorgan v Somerset (18 July) ====
18 July
18:30 (D/N)
Scorecard

Glamorgan; 180/5 (20 overs)	v	Somerset; 181/2 (18 overs)
David Lloyd 57 (37); Roelof van der Merwe 2/17 (4 overs)		Tom Banton 64 (34); Andrew Salter 1/22 (2 overs)

Somerset won by 8 wickets
Sophia Gardens, Cardiff
Umpires: James Middlebrook and Richard Illingworth
Player of the match: Tom Banton (Somst)

- Somerset won the toss and elected to field.
- Jeremy Lawlor and Owen Morgan (both Glam) made their T20 debuts.
- Points: Somerset 2, Glamorgan 0.

==== Gloucestershire v Glamorgan (19 July) ====
19 July
14:30
Scorecard

Glamorgan; 96/8 (15.3 overs)	v	Gloucestershire
David Lloyd 21 (20); Benny Howell 5/18 (4 overs)

No result
College Ground, Cheltenham
Umpires: Nick Cook and Russell Warren

- Gloucestershire won the toss and elected to field.
- James Bracey (Glos) made his T20 debut.
- Points: Glamorgan 1, Gloucestershire 1.

==== Surrey v Glamorgan (25 July) ====
25 July
18:30 (D/N)
Scorecard

Surrey; 141 (20 overs)	v	Glamorgan; 44 (12.5 overs)
Will Jacks 40 (26); Marchant de Lange 4/26 (2.5 overs)		Fakhar Zaman 17 (27); Tom Curran 3/3 (2 overs)

Surrey won by 97 runs
The Oval, London
Umpires: Ben Debenham and Alex Wharf
Player of the match: Tom Curran (Surrey)

- Glamorgan won the toss and elected to field.
- Tom Curran (Surrey) took a hat-trick.
- This was Glamorgan's lowest total in a T20 match.
- Points: Surrey 2, Glamorgan 0.

==== Glamorgan v Middlesex (26 July) ====
26 July
18:30 (D/N)
Scorecard

Glamorgan; 136 (19.3 overs)	v	Middlesex; 137/2 (17.2 overs)
Chris Cooke 29 (16); Toby Roland-Jones 5/21 (3.3 overs)		Stephen Eskinazi 51 (29); Marchant de Lange 1/16 (3.2 overs)

Middlesex won by 8 wickets
Sophia Gardens, Cardiff
Umpires: Mark Newell and David Millns
Player of the match: Toby Roland-Jones (Middx)

- Middlesex won the toss and elected to field.
- Toby Roland-Jones (Middx) took a hat-trick.
- Points: Middlesex 2, Glamorgan 0.

==== Glamorgan v Gloucestershire (1 August) ====
1 August
19:00 (D/N)
Scorecard

Glamorgan; 172/5 (20 overs)	v	Gloucestershire; 172/7 (20 overs)
Fakhar Zaman 58 (43); Ryan Higgins 1/29 (3 overs)		Ian Cockbain 40 (33); Andrew Salter 4/12 (3 overs)

Match tied
Sophia Gardens, Cardiff
Umpires: Neil Mallender and Jeff Evans
Player of the match: Andrew Tye (Glos)

- Gloucestershire won the toss and elected to field.
- Points: Glamorgan 1, Gloucestershire 1.

==== Hampshire v Glamorgan (2 August) ====
2 August
19:00 (D/N)
Scorecard

Hampshire; 128/7 (20 overs)	v	Glamorgan; 87 (15.3 overs)
James Vince 25 (21); Marchant de Lange 2/24 (4 overs)		David Lloyd 26 (29); Liam Dawson 3/11 (3.3 overs)

Hampshire won by 41 runs
Rose Bowl, Southampton
Umpires: Ben Debenham and Mike Burns
Player of the match: Liam Dawson (Hants)

- Hampshire won the toss and elected to bat.
- Points: Hampshire 2, Glamorgan 0.

==== Sussex v Glamorgan (6 August) ====
6 August
19:00 (D/N)
Scorecard

Glamorgan; 146/9 (20 overs)	v	Sussex Sharks; 150/1 (13.5 overs)
David Lloyd 50 (37); Reece Topley 3/20 (4 overs)		Phil Salt 78* (42); Michael Hogan 1/48 (3.5 overs)

Sussex Sharks won by 9 wickets
County Ground, Hove
Umpires: Ian Gould and Rob Bailey
Player of the match: Phil Salt (Sssx)

- Glamorgan won the toss and elected to bat.
- Points: Sussex Sharks 2, Glamorgan 0.

==== Glamorgan v Essex (9 August) ====
9 August
18:30 (D/N)
Scorecard

Essex Eagles; 30/1 (4 overs)	v	Glamorgan
Cameron Delport 20 (19); Graham Wagg 1/6 (1 over)

No result
Sophia Gardens, Cardiff
Umpires: James Middlebrook and Alex Wharf

- Glamorgan won the toss and elected to field.
- Match reduced to 11 overs per side due to rain.
- Callum Taylor (Glam) made his T20 debut.
- Points: Glamorgan 1, Essex Eagles 1.

==== Glamorgan v Surrey (11 August) ====
11 August
14:30
Scorecard

Glamorgan; 152/6 (20 overs)	v	Surrey; 155/3 (19 overs)
Colin Ingram 41 (33); Tom Curran 2/30 (4 overs)		Mark Stoneman 53 (49); Ruaidhri Smith 3/21 (4 overs)

Surrey won by 7 wickets
Sophia Gardens, Cardiff
Umpires: Nick Cook and Paul Baldwin
Player of the match: Mark Stoneman (Surrey)

- Surrey won the toss and elected to field.
- Points: Surrey 2, Glamorgan 0.

==== Kent v Glamorgan (14 August) ====
14 August
19:00 (D/N)
Scorecard

Kent Spitfires	v	Glamorgan

Match abandoned without a ball bowled
St Lawrence Ground, Canterbury
Umpires: Ben Debenham and Jeremy Lloyds

- No toss.
- Points: Kent Spitfires 1, Glamorgan 1.

==== Essex v Glamorgan (16 August) ====
16 August
19:00 (D/N)
Scorecard

Essex Eagles	v	Glamorgan

Match abandoned without a ball bowled
County Ground, Chelmsford
Umpires: Ian Blackwell and Rob Bailey

- No toss.
- Points: Essex Eagles 1, Glamorgan 1.

==== Somerset v Glamorgan (24 August) ====
24 August
19:00 (D/N)
Scorecard

Somerset; 177/8 (20 overs)	v	Glamorgan; 152 (20 overs)
Babar Azam 63 (42); Marchant de Lange 3/36 (4 overs)		David Lloyd 63 (37); Max Waller 3/19 (4 overs)

Somerset won by 25 runs
County Ground, Taunton
Umpires: Neil Mallender and David Millns
Player of the match: Babar Azam (Somst)

- Glamorgan won the toss and elected to field.
- Roman Walker (Glam) made his T20 debut.
- This match was played on an experimental hybrid pitch.
- Points: Somerset 2, Glamorgan 0.

==== Glamorgan v Sussex (26 August) ====
26 August
14:30
Scorecard

Glamorgan; 174/4 (20 overs)	v	Sussex Sharks; 176/3 (16.5 overs)
Shaun Marsh 52 (50); Chris Jordan 2/35 (4 overs)		Alex Carey 61 (30); Andrew Salter 3/37 (4 overs)

Sussex Sharks won by 7 wickets
Sophia Gardens, Cardiff
Umpires: Neil Mallender and Mike Burns
Player of the match: Alex Carey (Sssx)

- Glamorgan won the toss and elected to bat.
- Prem Sisodiya (Glam) made his T20 debut.
- Points: Sussex Sharks 2, Glamorgan 0.

==== Glamorgan v Hampshire (30 August) ====
30 August
18:30 (D/N)
Scorecard

Glamorgan; 216/5 (20 overs)	v	Hampshire; 188/8 (20 overs)
Chris Cooke 45 (23); Chris Wood 2/67 (4 overs)		Sam Northeast 60 (41); Roman Walker 3/39 (4 overs)

Glamorgan won by 28 runs
Sophia Gardens, Cardiff
Umpires: Tom Lungley and Jeremy Lloyds
Player of the match: Chris Cooke (Glam)

- Glamorgan won the toss and elected to bat.
- Points: Glamorgan 2, Hampshire 0.

== Statistics ==
=== Batting ===
First-class
Player	Matches	Innings	NO	Runs	HS	Ave	SR	100	50	0	4s	6s
Marnus Labuschagne	10	18	1	1,114	182	65.52	76.19	5	5	1	154	8
Billy Root	14	22	1	768	229	36.57	64.05	2	1	2	99	1
Nick Selman	14	24	2	752	150	34.18	46.50	1	6	3	95	0
David Lloyd	14	23	1	668	97	30.36	53.26	0	4	1	97	3
Charlie Hemphrey	10	18	1	546	75	32.11	41.71	0	5	2	77	3
Graham Wagg	10	16	3	418	100	32.15	61.02	1	1	1	49	9
Chris Cooke	7	10	2	368	96	46.00	70.36	0	2	0	56	3
Tom Cullen	9	12	3	319	63	35.44	43.51	0	4	0	35	0
Dan Douthwaite	7	12	0	298	63	24.83	61.95	0	1	1	44	1
Lukas Carey	9	12	3	230	62*	25.55	86.14	0	2	1	35	3
Source: Cricinfo

List A
Player	Matches	Innings	NO	Runs	HS	Ave	SR	100	50	0	4s	6s
Billy Root	8	7	1	386	113*	64.33	95.30	1	2	1	35	4
Chris Cooke	8	8	0	337	161	42.12	96.01	1	0	1	34	9
David Lloyd	8	8	1	240	84	34.28	93.02	0	2	0	29	4
Graham Wagg	8	7	0	207	68	29.57	102.47	0	2	1	20	7
Marchant de Lange	8	7	2	159	58*	31.80	152.88	0	1	0	11	12
Charlie Hemphrey	8	6	0	134	87	22.33	93.70	0	1	1	15	2
Jeremy Lawlor	5	5	0	129	48	25.80	74.13	0	0	0	12	3
Marnus Labuschagne	8	8	1	123	54	17.57	67.95	0	1	0	9	3
Lukas Carey	7	4	1	92	39	30.66	101.09	0	0	0	12	1
Dan Douthwaite	3	3	1	61	52*	30.50	141.86	0	1	1	6	2
Source: Cricinfo

Twenty20
Player	Matches	Innings	NO	Runs	HS	Ave	SR	100	50	0	4s	6s
David Lloyd	12	11	0	358	63	32.54	139.84	0	3	0	46	7
Colin Ingram	12	11	1	261	50*	26.10	145.00	0	2	1	19	15
Chris Cooke	12	11	2	196	45	21.77	145.18	0	0	0	8	12
Fakhar Zaman	7	6	0	99	58	16.50	93.39	0	1	2	12	2
Nick Selman	3	3	0	93	40	31.00	143.07	0	0	0	11	3
Shaun Marsh	4	4	0	86	52	21.50	104.87	0	1	1	9	2
Dan Douthwaite	8	8	2	64	24	10.66	83.11	0	0	0	3	2
Jeremy Lawlor	6	5	0	60	43	12.00	113.20	0	0	1	6	1
Billy Root	6	6	0	60	24	10.00	95.23	0	0	1	5	0
Graham Wagg	9	6	1	55	36*	11.00	110.00	0	0	1	3	3
Source: Cricinfo

=== Bowling ===
First-class
Player	Matches	Innings	Overs	Maidens	Runs	Wickets	BBI	BBM	Ave	Econ	SR	5w	10w
Michael Hogan	11	18	349.0	85	974	46	5/62	7/71	21.17	2.79	45.52	1	0
Marchant de Lange	8	14	244.4	33	950	26	4/64	7/125	36.53	3.88	56.46	0	0
Marnus Labuschagne	10	17	192.2	16	724	19	3/52	5/77	38.10	3.76	60.73	0	0
Lukas Carey	9	15	242.3	50	766	19	4/54	5/89	40.31	3.15	76.57	0	0
Dan Douthwaite	7	12	132.1	10	612	17	4/48	6/137	36.00	4.63	46.64	0	0
Graham Wagg	10	16	236.0	35	789	17	3/59	5/94	46.41	3.34	83.29	0	0
Timm van der Gugten	8	13	198.0	26	705	15	3/44	5/112	47.00	3.56	79.20	0	0
Samit Patel	4	6	122.1	40	292	12	4/58	6/103	24.33	2.39	61.08	0	0
David Lloyd	14	17	128.1	22	437	10	2/35	2/31	43.70	3.40	76.90	0	0
Ruaidhri Smith	3	5	67.0	11	224	7	3/43	3/53	32.00	3.34	57.42	0	0
Source: Cricinfo

List A
Player	Matches	Innings	Overs	Maidens	Runs	Wickets	BBI	Ave	Econ	SR	4w	5w
Marchant de Lange	8	7	62.5	2	421	16	4/63	26.31	6.70	23.56	1	0
Graham Wagg	8	7	52.3	1	327	9	3/46	36.33	6.22	35.00	0	0
Marnus Labuschagne	8	7	58.0	0	340	7	3/46	48.57	5.86	49.71	0	0
Timm van der Gugten	5	4	32.1	1	190	4	2/63	47.50	5.90	48.25	0	0
Lukas Carey	7	6	48.0	3	251	4	2/64	62.75	5.22	72.00	0	0
Billy Root	8	4	20.0	0	115	3	2/36	38.33	5.75	40.00	0	0
Michael Hogan	3	3	23.0	2	140	3	2/52	46.66	6.08	46.00	0	0
Dan Douthwaite	3	2	13.0	1	83	2	2/46	41.50	6.38	39.00	0	0
Craig Meschede	3	3	15.0	0	89	1	1/27	89.00	5.93	90.00	0	0
Source: Cricinfo

Twenty20
Player	Matches	Innings	Overs	Maidens	Runs	Wickets	BBI	Ave	Econ	SR	4w	5w
Andrew Salter	12	10	34.0	0	269	14	4/12	19.21	7.91	14.57	2	0
Marchant de Lange	12	11	33.1	0	304	13	4/26	23.38	9.16	15.30	1	0
Graham Wagg	9	8	23.0	0	170	5	2/28	34.00	7.39	27.60	0	0
Ruaidhri Smith	4	4	14.0	0	121	5	3/21	24.20	8.64	16.80	0	0
Roman Walker	3	3	11.5	0	119	5	3/39	23.80	10.05	14.20	0	0
Dan Douthwaite	8	7	17.0	0	154	3	1/25	51.33	9.05	34.00	0	0
Lukas Carey	5	5	16.0	0	148	2	1/15	74.00	9.25	48.00	0	0
Fakhar Zaman	7	2	6.0	0	26	1	1/15	26.00	4.33	36.00	0	0
David Lloyd	12	4	4.0	0	31	1	1/6	31.00	7.75	24.00	0	0
Prem Sisodiya	2	2	8.0	0	70	1	1/45	70.00	8.75	48.00	0	0
Michael Hogan	5	4	12.0	0	117	1	1/48	117.00	9.75	72.00	0	0
Source: Cricinfo
