= Glamorgan County Cricket Club in 2018 =

Welsh cricket club season

Glamorgan County Cricket Club
2018 season
- Coach: (Wales) Robert Croft
- Captain: (Australia) Michael Hogan (red ball) (South Africa) Colin Ingram (white ball)
- Overseas player: (Australia) Shaun Marsh (until 8 July) (Australia) Usman Khawaja (9–28 June, 6 July – 4 August) (Australia) Joe Burns (20 July – 2 August) (South Africa) Stephen Cook (1 September)
- Ground(s): Sophia Gardens, Cardiff; St Helen's, Swansea; Penrhyn Avenue, Rhos-on-Sea
- County Championship: 9th, Division Two
- One-Day Cup: 9th, South Group
- T20 Blast: 6th, South Group
- Most runs: FC: Chris Cooke (606); LA: Colin Ingram (402); T20: Colin Ingram (430)
- Most wickets: FC: Michael Hogan (45); LA: Graham Wagg (9); T20: Timm van der Gugten (19)
- Most catches: FC: Nick Selman (21); LA: David Lloyd (4); T20: Aneurin Donald (10)
- Most wicket-keeping dismissals: FC: Chris Cooke (41 ct + 1 st); LA: Chris Cooke (10 ct + 1 st); T20: Chris Cooke (10 ct + 3 st)

The 2018 season was Glamorgan County Cricket Club's 131st year in existence and their 98th as a first-class cricket county. They played most of their home matches at Sophia Gardens in Cardiff, but also played matches at outgrounds in Swansea (St Helen's) and Rhos-on-Sea (Penrhyn Avenue). They finished bottom of Division Two in the County Championship, 34 points adrift of second-bottom Northamptonshire; they also finished bottom the South Group in the One-Day Cup and sixth in the South Group of the T20 Blast, three points off qualifying for the quarter-finals.

The team was led by Robert Croft for a third and final season as head coach; the club's lack of success led to them parting ways with Croft in October 2018, ending a 32-year association since Croft signed as a youth player in 1986. Australian bowler Michael Hogan was named captain for the County Championship, having filled the role on an interim basis following the retirement of Jacques Rudolph the previous year, while South African batter Colin Ingram took over from countryman Rudolph in the One-Day Cup and the T20 Blast.

As a replacement for Rudolph as their overseas player, Glamorgan signed Australian opening batter Shaun Marsh to a two-year contract. Marsh had previously played for Glamorgan in the 2012 Twenty20 Cup, and had spent part of the 2017 season with Yorkshire. In May 2018, Marsh was called up by the Australia national team for their One Day International (ODI) series against England, which meant he missed three matches in June; to cover Marsh's absence, Glamorgan brought forward the arrival of fellow Australian batter Usman Khawaja, who had originally been signed as their second overseas player for the T20 Blast. Khawaja was unavailable for Glamorgan's final T20 match as he was called up by the Australia A team for a tour of India in August and September. After Marsh injured his shoulder in the second match of the T20 Blast, Glamorgan signed another Australian batter Joe Burns to replace him. Marsh's injury ruled him out for the remainder of the season, resulting in Glamorgan signing South Africa batter Stephen Cook for the last four County Championship matches.

In addition to Rudolph's retirement, Glamorgan also saw batter Will Bragg give up professional cricket in the off-season after suffering from ill health throughout the 2017 season. Batter Aneurin Donald left on an initial loan to Hampshire in August 2018; having failed to agree a new contract, Donald sought to leave Glamorgan and was allowed to go out on loan before a permanent move at the end of the season.

== Pre-season and friendlies ==
=== MCC University Match: Glamorgan v Cardiff MCCU (13–15 April) ===
13–15 April
Scorecard

Cardiff MCCU	v	Glamorgan
249 (91 overs); James Turpin 57* (112); Lukas Carey 4/39 (18 overs)		217/5d (68 overs); Kiran Carlson 69* (164); Andrew Brewster 3/46 (17 overs)
56/2 (29 overs); Alex Milton 28* (79); Marchant de Lange 2/9 (5 overs)

Match drawn
Sophia Gardens, Cardiff
Umpires: Alex Wharf and Tom Lungley

- Glamorgan won the toss and elected to field.

== County Championship ==
=== Standings ===
Team	Pld	W	L	T	D	A	Bat	Bowl	Ded	Pts
Warwickshire (P)	14	9	2	0	3	0	41	42	0	242
Kent (P)	14	10	3	0	1	0	16	40	0	221
Sussex	14	6	4	0	4	0	32	38	0	186
Middlesex	14	7	4	0	3	0	14	38	0	179
Gloucestershire	14	5	4	0	5	0	15	37	0	157
Leicestershire	14	5	7	0	2	0	22	40	3	149
Derbyshire	14	4	7	0	3	0	30	38	0	147
Durham	14	4	7	0	3	1	16	35	0	130
Northamptonshire	14	4	8	0	1	1	14	38	0	126
Glamorgan	14	2	10	0	2	0	13	38	1	92

Source: Cricinfo

- Warwickshire and Kent were promoted to Division One

=== Matches ===
==== Gloucestershire v Glamorgan (20–23 April) ====
20–23 April 2018
Scorecard

Gloucestershire	v	Glamorgan
236 (85.4 overs); Kieran Noema-Barnett 46 (125); Marchant de Lange 5/62 (20.4 overs)		526/9d (153 overs); David Lloyd 119 (157); Ryan Higgins 3/102 (30 overs)
372 (118 overs); James Bracey 120* (328); Lukas Carey 4/105 (28 overs)		85/4 (12.5 overs); Nick Selman 36 (39); Matt Taylor 3/25 (6 overs)

Glamorgan won by 6 wickets
County Ground, Bristol
Umpires: Jeff Evans and Paul Pollard

- Toss uncontested, Glamorgan elected to field first.
- Points: Glamorgan 22, Gloucestershire 2.

==== Middlesex v Glamorgan (27–30 April) ====
27–30 April 2018
Scorecard

Middlesex	v	Glamorgan
194 (42.1 overs); Stevie Eskinazi 94 (91); Michael Hogan 5/49 (13.1 overs)		38/4 (15.5 overs); Nick Selman 21 (54); Tim Murtagh 4/12 (8 overs)

Match drawn
Lord's, London
Umpires: Ian Gould and Rob Bailey

- Toss uncontested, Glamorgan elected to field first.
- No play possible on Days 2 and 4 due to rain.
- Tom Barber (Middx) made his first-class debut.
- Points: Glamorgan 8, Middlesex 6.

==== Glamorgan v Kent (4–6 May) ====
4–6 May 2018
Scorecard

Glamorgan	v	Kent
94 (46.4 overs); Jack Murphy 39* (135); Darren Stevens 6/26 (16 overs)		174 (50.5 overs); Joe Denly 43 (51); Timm van der Gugten 7/42 (19.5 overs)
274 (86.3 overs); Shaun Marsh 76 (113); Matt Henry 4/59 (20.3 overs)		195/4 (48.5 overs); Heino Kuhn 69* (87); Marchant de Lange 2/50 (12 overs)

Kent won by 6 wickets
Sophia Gardens, Cardiff
Umpires: Graham Lloyd and Billy Taylor

- Toss uncontested, Kent elected to field first.
- Points: Kent 19, Glamorgan 3.

==== Leicestershire v Glamorgan (11–13 May) ====
11–13 May 2018
Scorecard

Leicestershire	v	Glamorgan
191 (69.1 overs); Neil Dexter 87 (172); Michael Hogan 3/41 (16 overs)		178 (58.2 overs); Nick Selman 40 (96); Varun Aaron 4/65 (16 overs)
237 (77 overs); Ben Raine 65 (81); Michael Hogan 5/61 (29 overs)		247 (56.4 overs); Marchant de Lange 90 (45); Ben Raine 4/44 (14.4 overs)

Leicestershire won by 3 runs
Grace Road, Leicester
Umpires: Mike Burns and Peter Hartley

- Leicestershire won the toss and elected to bat first.
- Points: Leicestershire 19, Glamorgan 3.

==== Warwickshire v Glamorgan (9–12 June) ====
9–12 June 2018
Scorecard

Glamorgan	v	Warwickshire
220 (76.2 overs); David Lloyd 39 (69); Josh Poysden 5/29 (13.2 overs)		250 (93 overs); Ian Bell 106* (248); Timm van der Gugten 4/65 (20 overs)
323 (98.5 overs); Usman Khawaja 125 (143); Chris Wright 3/59 (16.5 overs)		294/6 (86.1 overs); Ian Bell 115* (164); Andrew Salter 4/80 (26 overs)

Warwickshire won by 4 wickets
Edgbaston, Birmingham
Umpires: Martin Saggers and Yeshwant Barde

- Glamorgan won the toss and elected to bat first.
- Points: Warwickshire 21, Glamorgan 4.

==== Glamorgan v Derbyshire (20–23 June) ====
20–23 June 2018
Scorecard

Glamorgan	v	Derbyshire
283 (71 overs); Andrew Salter 72* (103); Tony Palladino 5/69 (25 overs)		362 (127.5 overs); Alex Hughes 103 (186); Andrew Salter 4/105 (35 overs)
403/7d (82 overs); Kiran Carlson 152 (182); Alex Hughes 2/43 (7 overs)

Match drawn
St Helen's, Swansea
Umpires: Neil Bainton and Paul Baldwin

- Glamorgan won the toss and elected to bat first.
- Prem Sisodiya (Glamorgan) made his first-class debut.
- Points: Derbyshire 11, Glamorgan 8.

==== Glamorgan v Northamptonshire (25–28 June) ====
25–28 June 2018
Scorecard

Northamptonshire	v	Glamorgan
281 (87 overs); Alex Wakely 82 (148); Timm van der Gugten 5/45 (18 overs)		254 (65.3 overs); Usman Khawaja 103 (140); Ben Sanderson 3/30 (16 overs)
406/9d (99.3 overs); Ben Duckett 133 (154); Ruaidhri Smith 4/75 (20 overs)		200 (64 overs); Usman Khawaja 38 (36); Seekkuge Prasanna 4/49 (20 overs)

Northamptonshire won by 233 runs
Sophia Gardens, Cardiff
Umpires: Ben Debenham and Mike Burns

- Northamptonshire won the toss and elected to bat first.
- Points: Northamptonshire 21, Glamorgan 5.

==== Sussex v Glamorgan (22–23 July) ====
22–23 July 2018 (D/N)
Scorecard

Sussex	v	Glamorgan
327 (95.1 overs); Luke Wells 71 (142); Michael Hogan 4/39 (25 overs)		85 (28.4 overs); Chris Cooke 32 (72); Jofra Archer 4/15 (10 overs)
		88 (33.3 overs) (f/o); Kiran Carlson 22 (45); Jofra Archer 4/31 (9.3 overs)

Sussex won by an innings and 154 runs
County Cricket Ground, Hove
Umpires: Jeremy Lloyds and James Middlebrook

- Sussex won the toss and elected to bat first.
- Points: Sussex 22, Glamorgan 3.

==== Glamorgan v Durham (19–21 August) ====
19–21 August 2018
Scorecard

Glamorgan	v	Durham
154 (49.1 overs); Ruaidhri Smith 36 (36); Matt Salisbury 3/34 (13 overs)		295 (73.2 overs); Axar Patel 95* (99); Ruaidhri Smith 5/87 (20 overs)
111 (42.2 overs); Nick Selman 26 (36); Chris Rushworth 5/28 (12.2 overs)

Durham won by an innings and 30 runs
Sophia Gardens, Cardiff
Umpires: Jeff Evans and Alex Wharf

- Toss uncontested, Durham elected to field first.
- Points: Durham 21, Glamorgan 3.

==== Glamorgan v Warwickshire (29–31 August) ====
29–31 August 2018
Scorecard

Glamorgan	v	Warwickshire
203 (59.4 overs); Craig Meschede 53* (75); Olly Stone 4/28 (13 overs)		503 (133.3 overs); Ian Bell 204 (331); Ruaidhri Smith 3/98 (29.3 overs)
265 (77.4 overs); Ruaidhri Smith 52* (40); Jeetan Patel 7/83 (26.4 overs)

Warwickshire won by an innings and 35 runs
Penrhyn Avenue, Rhos-on-Sea
Umpires: Jeremy Lloyds and Paul Pollard

- Toss uncontested, Warwickshire elected to field first.
- Points: Warwickshire 23, Glamorgan 3.

==== Derbyshire v Glamorgan (4–6 September) ====
4–6 September 2018
Scorecard

Derbyshire	v	Glamorgan
251 (73 overs); Billy Godleman 95 (178); Graham Wagg 3/36 (12 overs)		121 (44.3 overs); David Lloyd 25 (35); Tony Palladino 6/29 (13 overs)
171 (55.4 overs); Alex Hughes 57 (96); Kieran Bull 3/36 (14 overs)		132 (46.5 overs); Chris Cooke 67 (98); Martin Andersson 4/25 (9 overs)

Derbyshire won by 169 runs
County Ground, Derby
Umpires: Billy Taylor and Ben Debenham

- Toss uncontested, Glamorgan elected to field first.
- Points: Derbyshire 21, Glamorgan 3.

==== Glamorgan v Gloucestershire (10–13 September) ====
10–13 September 2018
Scorecard

Glamorgan	v	Gloucestershire
137 (38.1 overs); Chris Cooke 60 (63); David Payne 4/25 (12.1 overs)		354 (128.4 overs); Jack Taylor 112 (214); Timm van der Gugten 4/66 (38 overs)
251 (79.3 overs); David Lloyd 54 (59); Matt Taylor 5/81 (20.3 overs)		35/1 (7.5 overs); Chris Dent 25* (28); Timm van der Gugten 1/19 (4 overs)

Gloucestershire won by 9 wickets
Sophia Gardens, Cardiff
Umpires: Neil Bainton and Ian Blackwell

- Toss uncontested, Gloucestershire elected to field first.
- Points: Gloucestershire 22, Glamorgan 2.

==== Kent v Glamorgan (18–20 September) ====
18–20 September 2018
Scorecard

Glamorgan	v	Kent
186 (67.1 overs); Jack Murphy 80 (182); Matt Henry 4/45 (18.1 overs)		436 (105.4 overs); Zak Crawley 168 (237); Kieran Bull 3/64 (18.4 overs)
78 (30.2 overs); Jack Murphy 22* (69); Darren Stevens 5/24 (13.2 overs)

Kent won by an innings and 172 runs
St Lawrence Ground, Canterbury
Umpires: Jeff Evans and Russell Warren

- Glamorgan won the toss and elected to bat first.
- Points: Kent 24, Glamorgan 3.

==== Glamorgan v Leicestershire (24–26 September) ====
24–26 September 2018
Scorecard

Glamorgan	v	Leicestershire
359 (103.4 overs); Kiran Carlson 83 (94); Gavin Griffiths 3/71 (21.4 overs)		132 (48.3 overs); Harry Dearden 48 (87); Graham Wagg 3/25 (10 overs)
175 (57.4 overs); Chris Cooke 45 (72); Tom Taylor 4/15 (12 overs)		270 (71.1 overs); Dieter Klein 94 (100); Michael Hogan 4/30 (16 overs)

Glamorgan won by 132 runs
Sophia Gardens, Cardiff
Umpires: Jeremy Lloyds and Ian Blackwell

- Toss uncontested, Leicestershire elected to field first.
- Points: Glamorgan 23, Leicestershire 3.

== One-Day Cup ==
=== Standings ===
Pos	Team	Pld	W	L	T	NR	Ded	Pts	NRR
1	Hampshire (Note: advanced directly to the semi-finals)	8	5	2	0	1	0	11	0.327
2	Essex Eagles (Note: advanced to the play-offs)	8	5	3	0	0	0	10	0.791
3	Kent Spitfires	8	5	3	0	0	0	10	0.010
4	Somerset	8	4	3	0	1	0	9	0.548
5	Surrey	8	4	3	0	1	0	9	−0.848
6	Middlesex	8	4	4	0	0	0	8	0.089
7	Gloucestershire	8	2	3	0	3	0	7	−0.250
8	Sussex Sharks	8	2	4	0	2	0	6	0.075
9	Glamorgan	8	1	7	0	0	0	2	−0.784

Source: Cricinfo

=== Matches ===
==== Glamorgan v Gloucestershire (18 May) ====
18 May 2018
11:00
Scorecard

Glamorgan; 264 (49.3 overs)	v	Gloucestershire; 265/2 (48.2 overs)
Shaun Marsh 57 (71); Chris Liddle 4/60 (10 overs)		George Hankins 85 (114); Graham Wagg 1/36 (10 overs)

Gloucestershire won by 8 wickets
Sophia Gardens, Cardiff
Umpires: Alex Wharf and Mike Burns

- Glamorgan won the toss and chose to bat.
- Points: Gloucestershire 2, Glamorgan 0.

==== Somerset v Glamorgan (20 May) ====
20 May 2018
11:00
Scorecard

Somerset; 372/7 (50 overs)	v	Glamorgan; 289 (46 overs)
James Hildreth 159 (123); Lukas Carey 2/57 (10 overs)		Colin Ingram 85 (70); Peter Trego 2/53 (8 overs)

Somerset won by 83 runs
County Ground, Taunton
Umpires: Jeremy Lloyds and Russell Warren

- Glamorgan won the toss and chose to field.
- Points: Somerset 2, Glamorgan 0.

==== Glamorgan v Middlesex (23 May) ====
23 May 2018
14:00 (D/N)
Scorecard

Middlesex; 304/6 (50 overs)	v	Glamorgan; 302/9 (50 overs)
James Franklin 62* (50); Colin Ingram 3/24 (7 overs)		David Lloyd 62 (75); Ravi Patel 3/58 (10 overs)

Middlesex won by 2 runs
Sophia Gardens, Cardiff
Umpires: Alex Wharf and Nick Cook
Player of the match: James Franklin (Middx)

- Glamorgan won the toss and chose to field.
- Points: Middlesex 2, Glamorgan 0.

==== Kent v Glamorgan (25 May) ====
25 May 2018
11:00
Scorecard

Glamorgan; 274 (49.3 overs)	v	Kent Spitfires; 278/6 (48.1 overs)
Nick Selman 92 (125); Joe Denly 4/56 (10 overs)		Joe Denly 150* (143); Ruaidhri Smith 2/41 (9 overs)

Kent Spitfires won by 4 wickets
St Lawrence Ground, Canterbury
Umpires: Ben Debenham and Michael Gough

- Kent Spitfires won the toss and chose to field.
- Points: Kent Spitfires 2, Glamorgan 0.

==== Essex v Glamorgan (30 May) ====
30 May 2018
11:00
Scorecard

Glamorgan; 200 (48.3 overs)	v	Essex Eagles; 201/1 (31.3 overs)
Chris Cooke 59 (75); Jamie Porter 4/29 (10 overs)		Varun Chopra 98* (84); Andrew Salter 1/44 (7 overs)

Essex Eagles won by 9 wickets
County Ground, Chelmsford
Umpires: Alex Wharf and Paul Baldwin

- Essex Eagles won the toss and chose to field.
- Connor Brown (Glam) made his List A debut.
- Points: Essex Eagles 2, Glamorgan 0.

==== Glamorgan v Sussex (1 June) ====
1 June 2018
11:00
Scorecard

Sussex Sharks; 277/8 (50 overs)	v	Glamorgan; 281/4 (48.2 overs)
David Wiese 67 (61); Timm van der Gugten 3/58 (10 overs)		Colin Ingram 95* (86); Chris Jordan 2/55 (10 overs)

Glamorgan won by 6 wickets
Sophia Gardens, Cardiff
Umpires: Mike Burns and Neil Mallender

- Glamorgan won the toss and chose to field.
- Points: Glamorgan 2, Sussex Sharks 0

==== Glamorgan v Hampshire (3 June) ====
3 June 2018
11:00 BST
Scorecard

Glamorgan; 227 (48.4 overs)	v	Hampshire; 229/6 (43.2 overs)
Colin Ingram 64 (66); Mason Crane 4/46 (10 overs)		Brad Taylor 54* (80); Graham Wagg 2/33 (6 overs)

Hampshire won by 4 wickets
St. Helen's, Swansea
Umpires: Richard Illingworth and Steve O'Shaughnessy

- Hampshire won the toss and chose to field.
- Points: Hampshire 2, Glamorgan 0.

==== Surrey v Glamorgan (6 June) ====
6 June 2018
14:00 BST (D/N)
Scorecard

Glamorgan; 266/8 (50 overs)	v	Surrey; 269/5 (40.4 overs)
Connor Brown 98 (136); Rikki Clarke 3/49 (10 overs)		Will Jacks 80 (57); Andrew Salter 2/50 (10 overs)

Surrey won by 5 wickets
The Oval, London
Umpires: Nigel Llong and Tim Robinson

- Surrey won the toss and chose to field.
- Points: Surrey 2, Glamorgan 0.

== T20 Blast ==
=== Standings ===
Pos	Team	Pld	W	L	T	NR	Ded	Pts	NRR
1	Somerset	14	10	4	0	0	0	20	0.786
2	Kent Spitfires	14	8	2	0	4	0	20	0.627
3	Sussex Sharks	14	7	3	0	4	0	18	0.737
4	Gloucestershire	14	8	4	0	2	0	18	0.381
5	Surrey	14	7	5	0	2	0	16	0.989
6	Glamorgan	14	7	6	0	1	0	15	−0.144
7	Essex Eagles	14	2	8	1	3	0	8	−1.035
8	Hampshire	14	2	9	1	2	0	7	−0.824
9	Middlesex	14	2	12	0	0	0	4	−1.128

Source: Cricinfo

Advance to quarter-finals

=== Matches ===
==== Hampshire v Glamorgan (6 July) ====
6 July (N)
Scorecard

Glamorgan; 168/6 (20 overs)	v	Hampshire; 105 (16.5 overs)
David Lloyd 38* (26); Liam Dawson 2/25 (4 overs)		Kyle Abbott 29 (20); Andrew Salter 3/34 (4 overs)

Glamorgan won by 63 runs
Rose Bowl, Southampton
Umpires: Ian Blackwell and Neil Bainton
Player of the match: Andrew Salter (Glam)

- Hampshire won the toss and elected to field.
- Points: Glamorgan 2, Hampshire 0.

==== Glamorgan v Sussex (8 July) ====
8 July
Scorecard

Glamorgan; 173/4 (20 overs)	v	Sussex; 177/2 (18.4 overs)
Colin Ingram 81* (44); Rashid Khan 2/27 (4 overs)		Luke Wright 88 (53); Michael Hogan 1/21 (3 overs)

Sussex won by 8 wickets
Sophia Gardens, Cardiff
Umpires: Ian Blackwell and Neil Bainton

- Glamorgan won the toss and elected to bat.
- Points: Sussex 2, Glamorgan 0.

==== Essex v Glamorgan (13 July) ====
13 July (N)
Scorecard

Essex; 167 (20 overs)	v	Glamorgan; 171/8 (20 overs)
Ryan ten Doeschate 43 (28); Michael Hogan 2/22 (4 overs)		Chris Cooke 60* (29); Adam Zampa 3/17 (4 overs)

Glamorgan won by 2 wickets
County Ground, Chelmsford
Umpires: Jeff Evans and Russell Warren
Player of the match: Chris Cooke (Glam)

- Glamorgan won the toss and elected to field.
- Points: Glamorgan 2, Essex 0.

==== Glamorgan v Somerset (20 July) ====
20 July (N)
Scorecard

Somerset; 190/5 (20 overs)	v	Glamorgan; 160/9 (20 overs)
Corey Anderson 59 (29); Timm van der Gugten 3/36 (4 overs)		Usman Khawaja 44 (31); Max Waller 2/20 (4 overs)

Somerset won by 30 runs
Sophia Gardens, Cardiff
Umpires: Billy Taylor and Tim Robinson
Player of the match: Corey Anderson (Somst)

- Glamorgan won the toss and elected to field.
- Points: Somerset 2, Glamorgan 0.

==== Gloucestershire v Glamorgan (27 July) ====
27 July
Scorecard

Gloucestershire; 197/6 (20 overs)	v	Glamorgan; 167/9 (20 overs)
Michael Klinger 77* (50); Ruaidhri Smith 2/25 (3 overs)		Colin Ingram 38 (28); Andrew Tye 3/17 (4 overs)

Gloucestershire won by 30 runs
College Ground, Cheltenham
Umpires: Neil Mallender and Paul Baldwin
Player of the match: Andrew Tye (Glos)

- Glamorgan won the toss and elected to field.
- Points: Gloucestershire 2, Glamorgan 0.

==== Glamorgan v Kent (29 July) ====
29 July
Scorecard

Glamorgan	v	Kent

Match abandoned without a ball bowled
Sophia Gardens, Cardiff
Umpires: Neil Mallender and Paul Pollard

- No toss.
- Rain prevented any play.
- Points: Glamorgan 1, Kent 1.

==== Surrey v Glamorgan (31 July) ====
31 July (N)
Scorecard

Surrey; 194/4 (20 overs)	v	Glamorgan; 195/6 (19 overs)
Nic Maddinson 70 (45); Graham Wagg 1/21 (4 overs)		Kiran Carlson 58 (32); Tom Curran 2/42 (4 overs)

Glamorgan won by 4 wickets
The Oval, London
Umpires: Nick Cook and Rob Bailey
Player of the match: Graham Wagg (Glam)

- Surrey won the toss and elected to bat.
- Points: Glamorgan 2, Surrey 0.

==== Glamorgan v Gloucestershire (3 August) ====
3 August (N)
Scorecard

Glamorgan; 201/6 (20 overs)	v	Gloucestershire; 199/9 (20 overs)
Craig Meschede 77* (47); Benny Howell 3/39 (4 overs)		Jack Taylor 52 (21); Michael Hogan 3/31 (4 overs)

Glamorgan won by 2 runs
Sophia Gardens, Cardiff
Umpires: Neil Bainton and Nick Cook
Player of the match: Craig Meschede (Glam)

- Gloucestershire won the toss and elected to field.
- Gloucestershire were awarded five penalty runs for fake fielding on ball 2.1.
- Points: Glamorgan 2, Gloucestershire 0.

==== Middlesex v Glamorgan (5 August) ====
5 August
Scorecard

Middlesex; 131 (20 overs)	v	Glamorgan; 135/3 (12.5 overs)
James Fuller 46* (30); Ruaidhri Smith 4/6 (4 overs)		Colin Ingram 46* (30); Steven Finn 2/37 (4 overs)

Glamorgan won by 7 wickets
Old Deer Park, Richmond
Umpires: David Millns and Graham Lloyd
Player of the match: Ruaidhri Smith (Glam)

- Glamorgan won the toss and elected to field.
- Points: Glamorgan 2, Middlesex 0.

==== Glamorgan v Essex (7 August) ====
7 August (N)
Scorecard

Glamorgan; 198/7 (20 overs)	v	Essex; 192/6 (20 overs)
Colin Ingram 89 (47); Matt Quinn 3/61 (4 overs)		Varun Chopra 54 (41); Timm van der Gugten 2/33 (4 overs)

Glamorgan won by 6 runs
Sophia Gardens, Cardiff
Umpires: Ian Blackwell and Michael Gough
Player of the match: Colin Ingram (Glam)

- Essex won the toss and elected to field.
- Points: Glamorgan 2, Essex 0.

==== Glamorgan v Hampshire (10 August) ====
10 August (N)
Scorecard

Hampshire; 151/8 (20 overs)	v	Glamorgan; 155/2 (15.5 overs)
Rilee Rossouw 50 (24); Craig Meschede 3/21 (4 overs)		Colin Ingram 71* (40); Dale Steyn 1/21 (3.5 overs)

Glamorgan won by 8 wickets
Sophia Gardens, Cardiff
Umpires: Ian Gould and Martin Saggers
Player of the match: Colin Ingram (Glam)

- Glamorgan won the toss and elected to field.
- Points: Glamorgan 2, Hampshire 0.

==== Somerset v Glamorgan (12 August) ====
12 August
Scorecard

Somerset; 210/8 (20 overs)	v	Glamorgan; 181/9 (20 overs)
Corey Anderson 72 (30); Timm van der Gugten 2/27 (3 overs)		Craig Meschede 35 (23); Max Waller 4/25 (4 overs)

Somerset won by 29 runs
County Ground, Taunton
Umpires: Jeff Evans and Martin Saggers
Player of the match: Corey Anderson (Somst)
Max Waller (Somst)

- Glamorgan won the toss and elected to field.
- Points: Somerset 2, Glamorgan 0.

==== Sussex v Glamorgan (14 August) ====
14 August (N)
Scorecard

Sussex; 186/5 (20 overs)	v	Glamorgan; 88 (13.3 overs)
Laurie Evans 63* (47); Andrew Salter 2/29 (4 overs)		Aneurin Donald 27 (21); Rashid Khan 3/9 (3 overs)

Sussex won by 98 runs
County Ground, Hove
Umpires: Michael Gough and Rob Bailey
Player of the match: Laurie Evans (Sssx)

- Glamorgan won the toss and elected to field.
- Points: Sussex 2, Glamorgan 0.

==== Glamorgan v Surrey (17 August) ====
17 August (N)
Scorecard

Glamorgan; 183/8 (20 overs)	v	Surrey; 60/0 (5 overs)
David Lloyd 39 (34); Tom Curran 3/30 (4 overs)		Aaron Finch 44* (16)

Surrey won by 24 runs (D/L method)
Sophia Gardens, Cardiff
Umpires: David Millns and Paul Baldwin
Player of the match: Aaron Finch (Surrey)

- Glamorgan won the toss and elected to bat.
- Rain reduced the Surrey innings to 5 overs.
- Points: Surrey 2, Glamorgan 0.

== Statistics ==
=== Batting ===
First-class
Player	Matches	Innings	NO	Runs	HS	Ave	SR	100	50	0	4s	6s
Chris Cooke	14	26	1	606	69	24.24	55.09	0	4	2	87	2
Kiran Carlson	13	25	1	567	152	23.62	57.21	1	1	3	87	0
Jack Murphy	12	23	2	533	80	25.38	40.50	0	2	2	81	0
David Lloyd	10	18	2	474	119	29.62	64.31	1	1	0	69	5
Usman Khawaja	4	8	0	420	126	52.50	72.16	3	0	1	58	5
Nick Selman	12	23	0	403	42	17.52	43.00	0	0	2	53	0
Ruaidhri Smith	7	14	2	246	52*	20.50	67.58	0	1	1	42	2
Timm van der Gugten	10	18	5	217	60*	16.69	57.86	0	2	2	33	0
Andrew Salter	10	17	3	204	72*	14.57	43.40	0	1	0	26	2
Shaun Marsh	4	7	0	203	111	29.00	58.16	1	1	2	30	1
Source: Cricinfo

List A
Player	Matches	Innings	NO	Runs	HS	Ave	SR	100	50	0	4s	6s
Colin Ingram	8	8	1	402	95*	57.42	98.04	0	3	0	35	11
Nick Selman	8	8	0	236	92	29.50	68.80	0	1	1	24	0
David Lloyd	8	8	0	233	92	29.12	86.94	0	1	0	16	6
Graham Wagg	8	7	0	210	49	30.00	106.06	0	0	0	12	11
Chris Cooke	8	7	0	168	59	24.00	79.24	0	1	0	9	4
Connor Brown	3	3	0	163	98	54.33	63.67	0	1	0	16	1
Shaun Marsh	4	4	0	143	57	35.75	78.57	0	1	0	17	1
Aneurin Donald	6	6	0	115	48	19.16	86.46	0	0	2	16	1
Kiran Carlson	3	3	1	93	59*	46.50	113.41	0	1	0	9	5
Andrew Salter	8	7	1	89	43	14.83	100.00	0	0	1	5	3
Source: Cricinfo

Twenty20
Player	Matches	Innings	NO	Runs	HS	Ave	SR	100	50	0	4s	6s
Colin Ingram	11	11	3	430	89	53.75	164.75	0	3	0	40	23
Kiran Carlson	11	11	1	295	58	29.50	143.20	0	1	0	27	10
Craig Meschede	12	10	1	247	77*	27.44	153.41	0	1	1	18	15
Chris Cooke	13	12	3	238	60*	26.44	147.82	0	1	0	15	13
Aneurin Donald	13	13	0	206	37	15.84	138.25	0	0	1	18	10
Usman Khawaja	7	7	0	168	44	24.00	136.58	0	0	0	25	3
Graham Wagg	13	10	2	130	53*	16.25	144.44	0	1	2	10	5
David Lloyd	7	6	1	122	39	24.40	112.96	0	0	0	6	4
Andrew Salter	13	10	3	66	21	9.42	120.00	0	0	1	4	4
Timm van der Gugten	13	6	4	43	21*	21.50	143.33	0	0	1	1	2
Source: Cricinfo

=== Bowling ===
First-class
Player	Matches	Innings	Overs	Maidens	Runs	Wickets	BBI	BBM	Ave	Econ	SR	5w	10w
Michael Hogan	13	21	393.3	101	1,014	45	5/49	8/102	22.53	2.57	52.46	2	0
Timm van der Gugten	10	17	287.0	69	936	43	7/42	8/71	21.76	3.26	40.04	2	0
Ruaidhri Smith	7	10	155.3	24	593	20	5/87	7/148	29.65	3.81	46.65	1	0
Andrew Salter	10	14	245.0	45	759	18	4/80	6/145	42.16	3.09	81.66	0	0
Marchant de Lange	3	6	114.4	22	383	16	5/62	8/160	23.93	3.34	43.00	1	0
Lukas Carey	6	9	172.0	36	592	13	4/105	7/177	45.53	3.44	79.38	0	0
Kieran Bull	4	6	85.4	14	278	11	3/36	4/69	25.27	3.24	46.72	0	0
Craig Meschede	4	5	76.0	8	327	9	2/30	4/85	36.33	4.30	50.66	0	0
David Lloyd	10	14	105.3	19	343	9	2/31	2/16	38.11	3.25	70.33	0	0
Graham Wagg	4	6	82.4	13	258	8	3/25	3/52	32.25	3.12	62.00	0	0
Source: Cricinfo

List A
Player	Matches	Innings	Overs	Maidens	Runs	Wickets	BBI	Ave	Econ	SR	4w	5w
Graham Wagg	8	8	63.0	0	348	9	2/33	38.66	5.52	42.00	0	0
Timm van der Gugten	7	7	49.2	1	316	6	3/58	52.66	6.40	49.33	0	0
Andrew Salter	8	8	63.0	1	358	6	2/50	59.66	5.68	63.00	0	0
Marchant de Lange	3	3	26.0	1	221	5	3/65	44.20	8.50	31.20	0	0
Lukas Carey	7	7	57.4	2	321	5	2/57	64.20	5.56	69.20	0	0
Colin Ingram	8	8	39.4	0	221	4	3/24	55.25	5.57	59.50	0	0
Ruaidhri Smith	3	3	17.2	0	114	2	2/41	57.00	6.57	52.00	0	0
David Lloyd	8	6	25.0	0	154	2	1/17	77.00	6.16	75.00	0	0
Source: Cricinfo

Twenty20
Player	Matches	Innings	Overs	Maidens	Runs	Wickets	BBI	Ave	Econ	SR	4w	5w
Timm van der Gugten	13	13	42.4	1	427	19	4/31	22.47	10.00	13.47	1	0
Graham Wagg	13	12	37.5	0	331	14	2/17	23.64	8.74	16.21	0	0
Michael Hogan	13	13	46.0	0	416	13	3/31	32.00	9.04	21.23	0	0
Andrew Salter	13	12	37.0	1	285	11	3/34	25.90	7.70	20.18	0	0
Ruaidhri Smith	9	9	26.0	1	195	9	4/6	21.66	7.50	17.33	1	0
Craig Meschede	12	11	31.0	0	288	6	3/21	48.00	9.29	31.00	0	0
Colin Ingram	11	9	18.5	0	151	4	2/15	37.75	8.01	28.25	0	0
David Lloyd	7	1	1.0	0	6	1	1/6	6.00	6.00	6.00	0	0
Source: Cricinfo
