= Afghan cricket team in Scotland in 2016 =

International cricket tour

	Scotland	Afghanistan
- Dates: 4 July 2016 – 6 July 2016
Captains	Preston Mommsen	Asghar Stanikzai

One Day International series
- Results: Afghanistan won the 2-match series 1–0
Most runs	Craig Wallace (33)	Rahmat Shah (126)
Most wickets	Bradley Wheal (4)	Mohammad Nabi (3)

The Afghanistan cricket team toured Scotland in July 2016 to play two One Day Internationals (ODIs) matches at The Grange, Edinburgh. Both matches were affected by rain, with the first match being washed out. Afghanistan won the second match and took the series 1–0.

== Squads ==
ODIs
Scotland	Afghanistan
Preston Mommsen (c); Kyle Coetzer; Richie Berrington; Matthew Cross; Con de Lange; Alasdair Evans; Michael Leask; Calum MacLeod; Safyaan Sharif; Ruaidhri Smith; Craig Wallace; Mark Watt; Brad Wheal	Asghar Stanikzai (c); Javed Ahmadi; Yamin Ahmadzai; Mirwais Ashraf; Amir Hamza; Hameed Hassan; Rashid Khan; Mohammad Nabi; Gulbadin Naib; Rahmat Shah; Mohammad Shahzad; Samiullah Shinwari; Dawlat Zadran; Najibullah Zadran; Noor Ali Zadran; Shapoor Zadran

Nasir Jamal, Imran Janat and Afsar Zazai were named as reserve players for Afghanistan.

== ODI series ==
=== 1st ODI ===
4 July 2016
Scorecard

Afghanistan; 283/4 (47.2 overs)	v	Scotland
Rahmat Shah 100* (123); Bradley Wheal 2/51 (9 overs)

No result
The Grange Club, Edinburgh
Umpires: Mark Hawthorne (Ire) and Ian Ramage (Sco)

- Scotland won the toss and elected to field.
- Rain stopped play during the 48th over of Afghanistan's innings with no further play possible.
- Con de Lange and Ruaidhri Smith (both Sco) made their ODI debuts.
- Rahmat Shah (Afg) scored his first century in an ODI.

=== 2nd ODI ===
6 July 2016
Scorecard

Afghanistan; 178/6 (37.2 overs)	v	Scotland; 132 (27.1 overs)
Mohammad Shahzad 84 (91); Bradley Wheal 2/31 (8 overs)		Craig Wallace 33 (15); Mohammad Nabi 3/26

Afghanistan won by 78 runs (DLS method)
The Grange Club, Edinburgh
Umpires: Mark Hawthorne (Ire) and Ian Ramage (Sco)

- Afghanistan won the toss and elected to bat.
- Rain stopped play during Afghanistan's innings with Scotland being set a total of 211 runs to win from 36 overs.
