= Con de Lange =

South African cricketer

Personal information
- Full name: Con de Wet de Lange
- Born: 11 February 1981; Bellville, Cape Province, South Africa
- Died: 18 April 2019 (aged 38); Paisley, Renfrewshire, Scotland
- Batting: Right-handed
- Bowling: Slow left-arm orthodox
- Role: All-rounder

International information
- National side: Scotland (2015–2017)
- ODI debut (cap 58): 4 July 2016 v Afghanistan
- Last ODI: 25 November 2017 v Papua New Guinea
- T20I debut (cap 41): 19 June 2015 v Ireland
- Last T20I: 20 January 2017 v Ireland

Domestic team information
- Years: Team
- 1997/98–2006/07: Boland
- 2005/06–2007/08: Cape Cobras
- 2008/09–2010/11: Knights
- 2009/10–2010/11: Free State
- 2012–2013: Northamptonshire

Career statistics
Competition	ODI	T20I	FC	LA
Matches	13	8	91	144
Runs scored	123	35	2,888	1,646
Batting average	20.50	11.66	22.92	23.51
100s/50s	0/0	0/0	1/13	0/8
Top score	26*	22	109	66
Balls bowled	546	162	15,217	5,890
Wickets	16	8	183	149
Bowling average	23.18	21.37	38.43	29.07
5 wickets in innings	1	0	5	1
10 wickets in match	0	0	1	0
Best bowling	5/60	2/17	7/48	5/60
Catches/stumpings	7/–	3/–	48/–	47/–
- Source: CricInfo, 19 April 2019

Con de Wet de Lange (11 February 1981 – 18 April 2019) was a cricketer who represented Scotland. He was a left-arm orthodox spin all-rounder and a right-handed batsman. Born in South Africa, De Lange made his first-class debut for Boland in March 1998 against the touring Sri Lankans. He played for Northamptonshire County Cricket Club in the 2012 and 2013 seasons.

In October 2018, Cricket Scotland announced that de Lange was suffering from a brain tumour. In April 2019, the Professional Cricketers' Association confirmed that de Lange had died.

== International career ==
De Lange played for Scotland in the 2015–17 ICC Intercontinental Cup against Afghanistan in June 2015. He made his Twenty20 International (T20I) debut for Scotland against Ireland on 19 June 2015, although no play was possible due to rain. He made his One Day International (ODI) debut for Scotland against Afghanistan on 4 July 2016.

De Lange's international career lasted thirteen ODIs and eight T20Is,. He was the team's vice-captain for the Desert T20 Challenge tournament, which was played in the United Arab Emirates in January 2017. His most famous moment for Scotland came against Zimbabwe in June 2017, when his match haul of five wickets for 60 helped his team cause a famous upset, with their first win against a full member of the ICC.

== Illness and death ==
Shortly after the victory over Zimbabwe, de Lange started missing games in the World Cricket League (WCL) championships in Dubai. Initially, the reason given for his absence was "severe migraine headaches". Upon his return to Scotland for further tests, a far more severe diagnosis was made. De Lange played his last international match for Scotland, an ODI against Papua New Guinea, on 25 November 2017.

The results of medical tests were not published initially, and it was only during the 2019 World Cup qualifiers in Zimbabwe, played in October 2018, that Cricket Scotland sent a press release stating that the then 37-year old de Lange had been battling a brain tumour for the past 10 months. After the diagnosis, de Lange underwent a series of treatments, which included an operation followed by chemotherapy and radiation treatment.

Together with his wife Claire and children, de Lange set up a fundraising appeal called 'Brain Tumour Charity', in memory of a close friend who died from the disease. As part of the initiative, the de Langes arranged walks to raise donations.

On 18 April 2019, de Lange died at the age of 38.
