= Charlie Hemphrey =

English cricketer

Personal information
- Full name: Charlie Richard Hemphrey
- Born: 31 August 1989 (age 37); Doncaster, England
- Batting: Right-handed
- Bowling: Right arm off break
- Role: Batsman

Domestic team information
- Years: Team
- 2014/15–2019/20: Queensland (squad no. 44)
- 2019–2020: Glamorgan (squad no. 22)
- First-class debut: 7 February 2015 Queensland v Victoria
- List A debut: 9 October 2015 Queensland v Victoria

Career statistics
Competition	FC	LA
Matches	51	22
Runs scored	2,575	430
Batting average	28.93	21.50
100s/50s	4/16	0/2
Top score	118	87
Balls bowled	915	156
Wickets	8	2
Bowling average	80.00	75.50
5 wickets in innings	0	0
10 wickets in match	0	0
Best bowling	2/56	1/18
Catches/stumpings	38/–	9/–
- Source: Cricinfo, 25 August 2020

Charlie Richard Hemphrey (born 31 August 1989) is an English cricketer. He has played professional cricket in England, Australia, and Wales. Hemphrey was born in Doncaster, Yorkshire, but grew up in Kent and was educated at the Harvey Grammar School, Folkestone.

After playing in second teams for English county cricket clubs Kent, Essex, and Derbyshire, Hemphrey emigrated to Brisbane, working briefly for an airline before signing for Queensland cricket team. He made his List A debut for Queensland on 9 October 2015 in the 2015–16 Matador BBQs One-Day Cup in Australia.

In January 2019, he was signed by Glamorgan County Cricket Club, ahead of the 2019 County Championship in England, before returning home permanently in early 2020.

Hemphrey has since gained residency in Australia, putting doubt on his cricketing career in England due to a three-year qualification period set by the England and Wales Cricket Board (ECB). Hemphrey was released by Glamorgan ahead of the 2021 County Championship.
