= Mike Burns (cricketer) =

English cricketer and umpire

Michael Burns
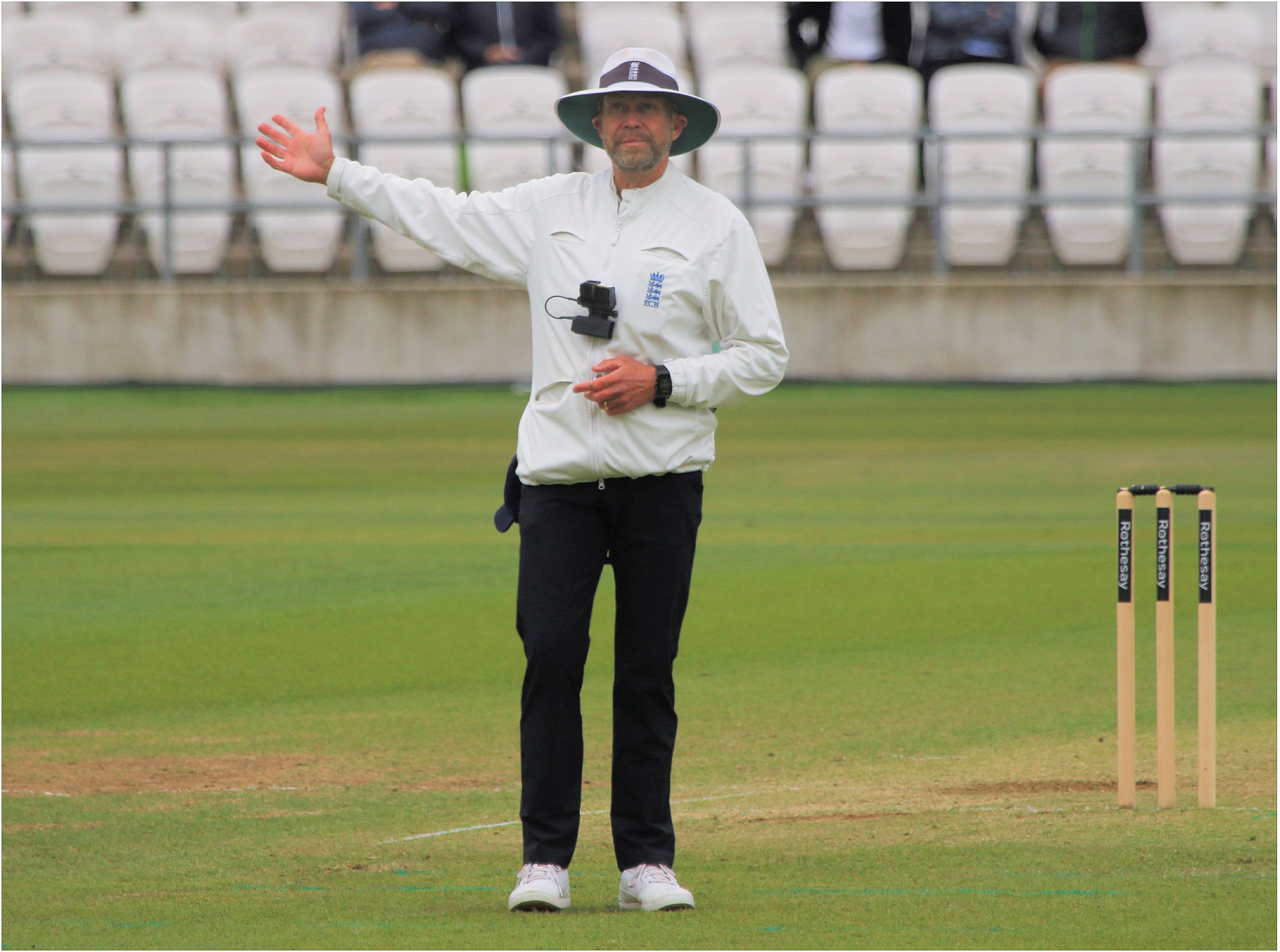
- Burns in 2025

Personal information
- Full name: Michael Burns
- Born: 6 February 1969 (age 57); Barrow-in-Furness, Lancashire, England
- Batting: Right-handed
- Bowling: Right-arm medium
- Role: All-rounder, umpire

Domestic team information
- Years: Team
- 1990–1996: Warwickshire
- 1997–2005: Somerset

Umpiring information
- ODIs umpired: 10 (2020–2026)
- T20Is umpired: 32 (2020–2026)
- WTests umpired: 1 (2013)
- WODIs umpired: 5 (2018–2023)
- WT20Is umpired: 6 (2019–2020)
- FC umpired: 116 (2012–present)
- LA umpired: 53 (2013–present)
- T20 umpired: 134 (2013–present)

Career statistics
Competition	FC	LA	T20
Matches	154	221	9
Runs scored	7,648	4,802	108
Batting average	32.68	25.81	15.42
100s/50s	8/51	3/31	0/0
Top score	221	115*	36
Balls bowled	4,751	1,844	36
Wickets	68	58	2
Bowling average	42.42	30.50	27.50
5 wickets in innings	1	0	0
10 wickets in match	0	0	0
Best bowling	6/54	4/39	1/15
Catches/stumpings	142/7	101/15	3/0
- Source: ESPNcricinfo, 05 October 2026

Michael Burns (born 6 February 1969) is an English first-class list cricket umpire and former first-class cricketer who played county cricket for Warwickshire and Somerset in a first-class career which spanned from 1992 until 2005. He also played Minor Counties cricket for Cumberland and Cornwall. An adaptable cricketer, he appeared for Cumberland and Warwickshire as a wicket-keeper, but when he moved to Somerset he developed into an aggressive batsman who bowled at medium-pace when needed.

Burns started his cricket career with Cumberland in 1988, but moved to Warwickshire in late 1990. He struggled to break into the first team with his new county, and spent most of his time with the club playing in the second team. As a wicket-keeper, his opportunities were limited by the presence of Keith Piper, and he failed to make an impact as a batsman when he was given chances in the first team. He only started to play regularly for the county in 1996, but opted to move to Somerset the following year.

For Somerset, Burns passed 1,000 first-class runs in a season twice, and was part of the team which won the 2001 Cheltenham & Gloucester Trophy. He provided Somerset with a batting all-rounder, particularly in one-day cricket in which he averaged 27 with the bat and 30 with the ball for the county. He took over as Somerset captain in 2003, primarily due to the lack of other suitable candidates. He continued in the role the following year, though he was criticised throughout due to poor results, which at one stage led to a number of Somerset players being threatened with sacking. He was replaced as captain in 2005 by Graeme Smith, and retired from first-class cricket at the end of that year. He subsequently trained as an umpire, and was promoted to the England and Wales Cricket Board's (ECB) reserve list in 2012.

In January 2016 Burns was promoted to the full list of the ECB's umpiring list.

== Career ==
=== Early life and minor counties cricket ===
Burns was born on 6 February 1969 in Barrow-in-Furness, Lancashire. He attended Walney Comprehensive in Barrow, and after completing his studies, joined the engineering firm Vickers. Burns began his county career playing Minor Counties cricket with Cumberland. He made his debut for the side in a two-day Championship match against Norfolk in July 1988. Playing as wicket-keeper, he claimed one catch and one stumping. He did not appear for the county's first team again for another year; in 1989, he played three times for Cumberland, appearing on each occasion as a specialist lower-order batsman. Early during the 1990 season, Burns played one match, without excelling, for Glamorgan's second team. He was a regular for Cumberland during 1990, and in his seven appearances in the Championship, he scored 180 runs at an average of 22.50, and took eleven catches and three stumpings.

=== Limited opportunities at Warwickshire ===
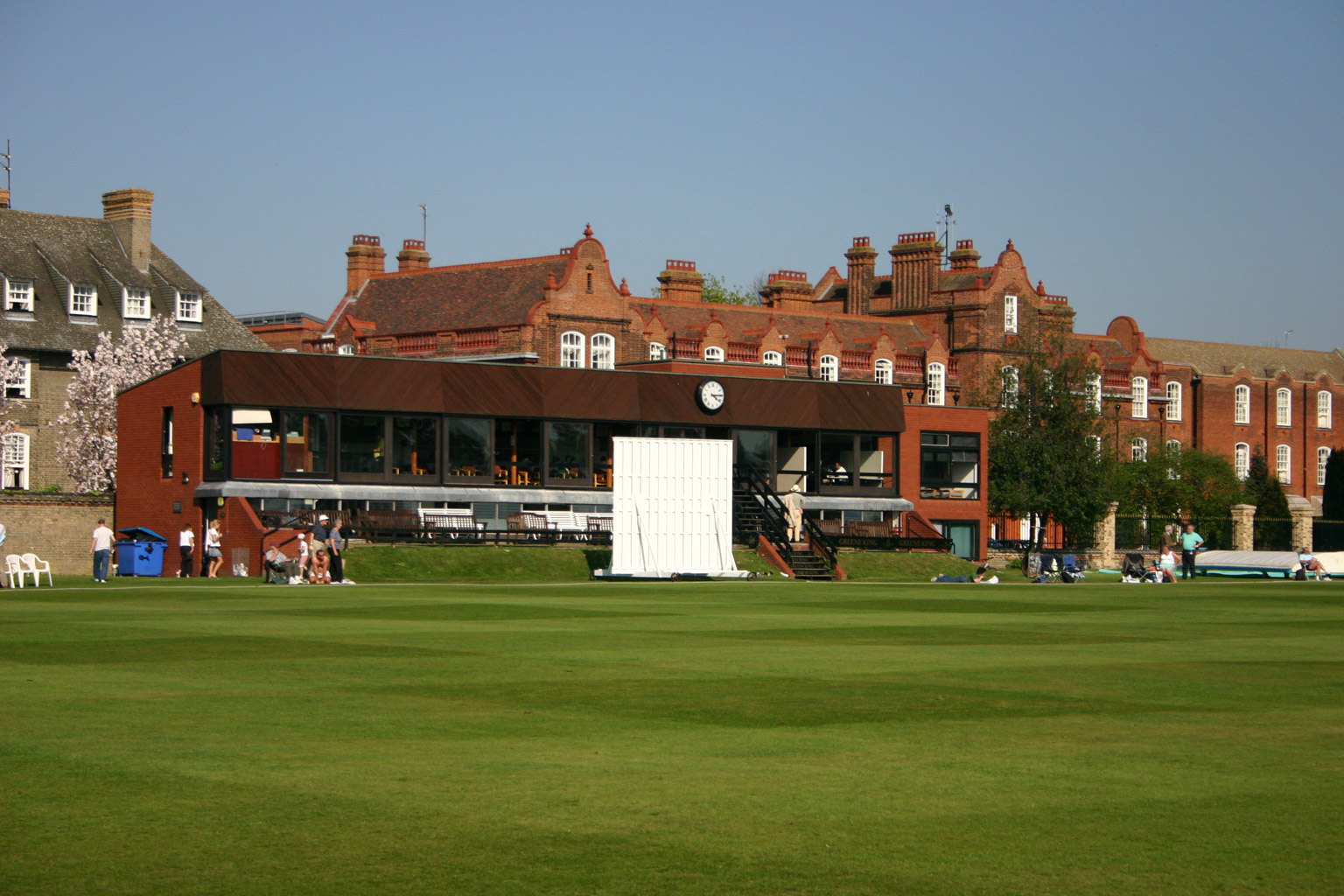
Burns made his first-class debut at Fenner's cricket ground in Cambridge.

After initially playing club cricket for Vickerstown, Burns moved to Netherfield Cricket Club, where he played alongside Dermot Reeve, the club's professional player. Reeve was impressed by an innings in which Burns scored a half-century, and arranged for Warwickshire to offer him a trial. Burns scored 83 runs in his trial match, and signed a contract shortly thereafter. At the end of that 1990 season, Burns played a second-team match for Warwickshire; the following season he made his debut in professional cricket for the county, playing a Benson & Hedges Cup match against Essex. He batted at number eight and kept wicket in a narrow loss for Warwickshire. He spent the remainder of the season playing for the county's second team, for whom he scored a number of half-centuries, with a top score of 93, scored against Worcestershire's seconds in a one-day match. He got his first opportunities in first-class cricket near the start of the 1992 season, making his debut in the format against Cambridge University in May. During his only batting innings, he scored 78 runs, and he also claimed two catches and a stumping. He was selected to play in the County Championship match a week later against Glamorgan, but in a match dominated by the spin of Robert Croft he was dismissed for scores of three and four. He returned to play in the second team for most of the season, though he played one further first-team match in August; appearing as a specialist batsman, Burns scored one run against Durham. In a late season second team match against Lancashire seconds, Burns scored 165 runs in the first innings of a drawn match.

Burns had more first team opportunities during the 1993 season, due to a series of hand injuries to the first-choice wicket-keeper, Keith Piper. Burns's chances came particularly in one-day cricket; he appeared in eleven List A matches during the year. He scored 151 runs across nine batting innings at an average of 25.16, and reached his highest score of the season, 48 not out, against the touring Zimbabweans in September. Despite making another large century for the second team, scoring 172 against Yorkshire seconds, he struggled in first-class cricket; in six appearances he averaged just 9.60 for his 96 runs. The following year, his only first-class match was against Oxford University, with Piper ever-present in the County Championship. Burns continued to be selected as a wicket-keeper batsman in one-day cricket, though he was less successful than the previous year, scoring 86 runs at 10.75.

In 1995, Burns was given a prolonged run in the Warwickshire team, playing both first-class and one-day cricket throughout April and May; he failed to impress during these matches, recording a highest score of 35 and averaging well under twenty in both forms of the game. He spent the rest of the season playing for the second team. Some strong performances for the seconds at the start of the 1996 season, including scores of 77 and 81 not out in a match against the Marylebone Cricket Club Young Cricketers, and a finger injury suffered by Piper, saw him regain a place in the Warwickshire first team in June. He remained in the first team for the rest of the season, playing as a specialist batsman when Piper returned to the side, and scored three half-centuries in first-class cricket, including his highest first-class score to that point, 81 runs scored against Nottinghamshire, during a match in which he also remained 65 not out in the second innings.

=== Move to Somerset ===
Towards the end of the 1996 season, Warwickshire's captain Dermot Reeve was forced to retire with a chronic hip injury. He moved to Somerset in 1997, where he took on the role of team coach; Burns followed him soon after. Somerset did not have a vacancy for a wicket-keeper; in 1997, Wisden Cricketers' Almanack described Robert Turner as top-class. As a result, Burns focussed on his batting, particularly in one-day cricket, and also developed as an occasional medium-pace bowler. He played significantly more cricket in 1997 than in any year previously; in first-class cricket he maintained his average from the previous year, scoring 510 runs at 25.50, and in one-day cricket he scored his maiden century in top-level cricket. Having never scored more than 48 runs in a List A match prior to 1997, Burns scored five half-centuries in addition to the 115 not out that he hit against Middlesex in September. His average of 31.35 in List A cricket that year was the highest of any season during his career, and Wisden judged that he had "made a good impression" in the season. As a bowler, Burns took almost a third of his List A wickets during 1997, claiming 18 at a bowling average of 24.77, while in the first-class game he was used more sparingly, and took 5 wickets at 53.20.

During the 1998 season, Burns recorded similar batting averages to the previous season, but was rarely used as a bowler. Wisden noted that he played some good first-class innings, but needed to be more consistent; an improvement he made in 1999. That following year, Burns achieved a batting average in excess of thirty for the first time, and scored the maiden century of his first-class career. Facing Leicestershire, who had not lost in the County Championship for 21 months, Burns scored 109, and shared a 244-run partnership with Peter Bowler to help Somerset to victory by 9 wickets. His second century that season came in a defeat to Worcestershire; chasing 316 runs to win in the fourth innings, Somerset were reduced to 56 for three. Burns played an attacking innings, hitting 105 runs from 103 deliveries to give his side a chance of victory, but Worcestershire eventually won by 26 runs.

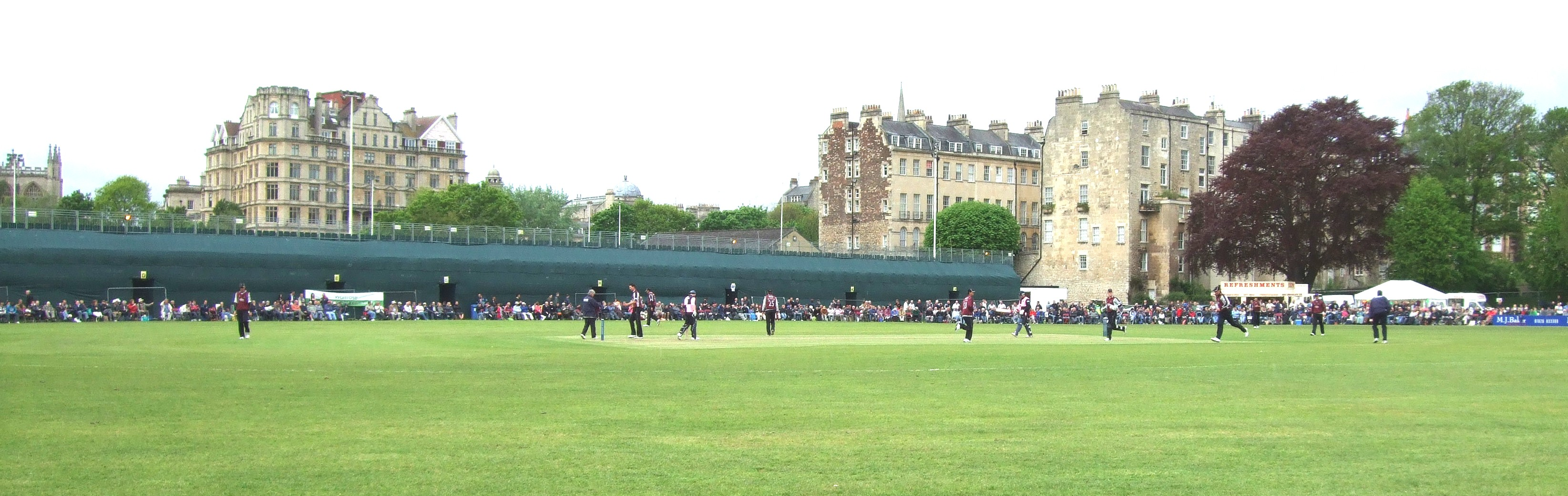
Burns's score of 221 is the highest first-class score of any Somerset batsman at the Recreation Ground in Bath

His batting continued to flourish at Somerset in first-class cricket; between 1999 and 2004, he consistently averaged over 35. His highest batting average came in 2000, when he scored 775 runs at 40.78. He was boosted that season by an early-season tally of 160 against Oxford Universities, as part of a 305-run partnership with Peter Bowler for the fourth wicket. The partnership was only five runs less than Somerset's record for the fourth wicket, made in 1980 by Peter Denning and Ian Botham. His performances in the County Championship were less impressive than his overall first-class record in 2000; he averaged below thirty in the competition, and only reached a century once, against Lancashire. In 2001, Burns reached his highest first-class score, and only double-century, scoring 221 against Yorkshire at the Recreation Ground in Bath. The total, made on what Wisden described as the "benignest of pitches", included 28 fours and 1 six, and took seven and three-quarter hours. The match finished as a high-scoring draw, with over 1,000 runs being scored. Burns's score is the highest by a Somerset batsman at the Recreation Ground during a first-class match, although three players have scored more playing against Somerset at the ground; Reggie Spooner scored 240 runs in 1906, Mike Gatting got 258 in 1984 and Warwick Armstrong scored an unbeaten 303 for Australia in 1905. Burns also scored his second century in List A cricket during 2001, striking 101 not out against Northamptonshire from 112 balls. When Somerset captain Jamie Cox broke his thumb, Burns took charge of the team for six matches in June and July 2001, a role he reprised for eight matches the following season. In 2001, Somerset recorded one of the best seasons in their history: they finished second in the County Championship, their highest ever position, and won the Cheltenham & Gloucester Trophy.

In 2002, Burns scored 1,000 first-class runs for the first time in his career, though he did not score a century during the year. He passed 50 on nine occasions, and narrowly missed out on tons against both Surrey, when he was dismissed on 99 by Rikki Clarke, and Sussex, when he was caught off the bowling of Mark Davis for 98. Despite Burns's run-tally, and in stark contrast to the previous year, Somerset's season was described in Wisden as "a sorry story". No other Somerset batsman passed 1,000 runs in the year, and the county were relegated in both the County Championship and the Norwich Union League, though they did reach the final of the Cheltenham & Gloucester Trophy for the second consecutive year. In the semi-final of that competition, Burns scored 72 runs, and "admirably set the foundations" for Somerset's victory.

=== Somerset captaincy ===
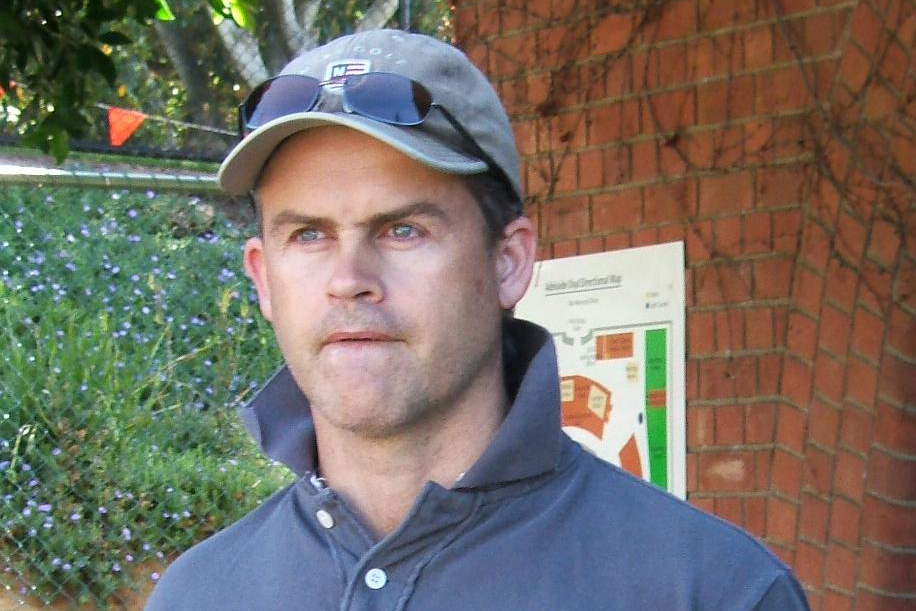
Burns took over the Somerset captaincy from Australian Jamie Cox.

Cox resigned the club captaincy at the end of the 2002 season, and Burns was named as his replacement; Wisden described him as a "dedicated, down-to-earth cricketer who hopes to lead by example from high in the order." In a preview of the 2003 season for the BBC, Simon Mann wrote that Somerset had the talent to improve and he predicted that an immediate promotion back to the first division of the County Championship was "a strong possibility." The season began in positive fashion for Burns; in a first-class match against Loughborough University he scored 83 runs in the first innings and was 118 not out in the second. He continued to score runs regularly, if not spectacularly, throughout the season, and passed 1,000 first-class runs for the second consecutive year. Ian Blackwell and Cox both reached the milestone as well for Somerset, but despite these individual achievements, the county struggled. Eight losses were suffered on the way to finishing third from bottom of the second division of the County Championship, and after one such result, a two-day loss against Northamptonshire in July, the club's chief executive sent a letter to ten members of the team warning them that they could be sacked. A few days later, against Durham, a second-innings total of 56 was the county's lowest score in a first-class match since 1970. (Note: Somerset have since recorded a lower team total, 50 runs against Warwickshire in 2011.) Although Burns had a relatively successful season statistically—his 1,133 first-class runs were the most he scored in any season of his career, and his first-class average was just under 40—he offered to step down as Somerset captain, but when a suitable alternative could not be found, he continued in the position for 2004.

The following season was another difficult one for both Burns and Somerset. Burns scored 733 first-class runs, but only passed 50 on five occasions, including a top score of 124 not out against Essex. Four wins late in the season pushed Somerset up to fourth in the second division of the County Championship, but the county were knocked out of the 2004 Cheltenham & Gloucester Trophy in the third round, and they finished eighth of ten in the second division of the totesport League. Their elimination from the Cheltenham & Gloucester Trophy came at the hands of Worcestershire; after Somerset had won the toss and Burns had chosen to bat, his side were bowled out for 95 runs, the tenth lowest List A total for the county. Burns was dismissed for a first-ball duck in the match, which Wisden reported was dominated by the "muscular hostility" of Andy Bichel, who took four wickets for Worcestershire. Both Burns and Somerset's first-team coach, Kevin Shine were criticised for the team's failures; Shine was reassigned as the county's academy director, while a committee of former captains was set up to assess the captaincy. On the recommendations of the group, composed of Roy Kerslake, Vic Marks and Brian Rose, Somerset signed the captain of the South Africa national cricket team, Graeme Smith, to lead them in 2005.

=== Later career ===
The signing of Smith, along with the youth policy adopted by Somerset's new first-team coach, Mark Garaway, meant that Burns had limited opportunities in 2005; he played nine first-class and eight List A matches during the season, and did not appear for the first team after July. He scored an early-season century, hitting eleven boundaries on his way to 107 runs against Warwickshire in the totesport League, but only scored 63 runs across his remaining seven one-day matches. As a result of his lack of first-team action, he opted to retire from first-class cricket at the end of the 2005 season. In all, he scored 7,648 first-class runs at an average of 32.68, and 4,802 List A runs at 25.81. He also took 68 first-class wickets and 58 in List A cricket.

Burns continued to play club cricket in Somerset for Taunton St Andrews Cricket Club until 2009, helping them to become West of England Premier League champions in his final season with the club. He made minor counties appearances for Cumberland throughout 2006, before switching to Cornwall in 2008. He also toured with the Marylebone Cricket Club, travelling to Brazil and Chile in March 2007, and to Saint Kitts and Nevis in March 2008. He has subsequently stood as an umpire, and after standing in second-eleven matches in 2011, he was added to the ECB's reserve list of umpires for 2012. He made his debut as an umpire in first-class matches in March 2012, officiating in a match between Somerset and the Cardiff MCC University side.

== See also ==
- List of One Day International cricket umpires
- List of Twenty20 International cricket umpires

== Notes and references ==
=== References ===
Sporting positions
Preceded by Jamie Cox	Somerset County Cricket Captain; 2003–2004	Succeeded by Graeme Smith
