= Ruaidhri Smith =

Scottish cricketer

Personal information
- Full name: Ruaidhri Alexander James Smith
- Born: 5 August 1994 (age 32); Glasgow, Scotland
- Height: 6 ft 2 in (1.88 m)
- Batting: Right-handed
- Bowling: Right-arm fast-medium
- Role: Bowling All-rounder

International information
- National side: Scotland (2013–present)
- ODI debut (cap 59): 4 July 2016 v Afghanistan
- Last ODI: 6 July 2016 v Afghanistan
- T20I debut (cap 48): 13 February 2019 v Netherlands
- Last T20I: 15 February 2019 v Ireland

Domestic team information
- Years: Team
- 2013–2023: Glamorgan (squad no. 20)

Career statistics
| Competition | ODI | T20I | FC | T20 |
|---|---|---|---|---|
| Matches | 2 | 2 | 31 | 42 |
| Runs scored | 10 | 9 | 693 | 107 |
| Batting average | 10.00 | – | 17.32 | 8.23 |
| 100s/50s | 0/0 | 0/0 | 0/2 | 0/0 |
| Top score | 10 | 9* | 57* | 22* |
| Balls bowled | 90 | 41 | 3,708 | 795 |
| Wickets | 1 | 0 | 69 | 36 |
| Bowling average | 97.00 | – | 34.97 | 31.91 |
| 5 wickets in innings | 0 | – | 1 | 0 |
| 10 wickets in match | 0 | – | 0 | 0 |
| Best bowling | 1/34 | – | 5/87 | 4/6 |
| Catches/stumpings | 0/– | 0/– | 4/– | 12/– |
- Source: CricInfo, 29 September 2023

Ruaidhri Alexander James Smith (born 5 August 1994) is a Scottish professional cricketer. Smith is a right-handed batsman who bowls right-arm fast medium. He was born in Glasgow and has an English father and an Irish mother. He made his One Day International debut for Scotland against Afghanistan on 4 July 2016.

== Career ==
Smith moved from Glasgow to Cardiff in Wales at the age of one. His junior cricket started at St Fagans CC and he played age-group cricket for Wales. He attended The Cathedral School, Llandaff before moving to Shrewsbury School for his A level studies. He made his debut in county cricket for Wales Minor Counties against Wiltshire in the 2010 MCCA Knockout Trophy, playing a further match in that season's competition against Devon. In that same season he also made his debut in the Minor Counties Championship against Oxfordshire, playing a further match in that season against Wiltshire. He made two appearances for the team in the 2011 MCCA Knockout Trophy against Devon and Wiltshire, as well as two games in the 2011 Minor Counties Championship against Cornwall and Herefordshire.

Smith played once for Wales Minor Counties in May 2012, in the MCCA Knockout Trophy against Staffordshire. In June of that year, Smith was named in the Scotland Under-19 squad for the 2012 ICC Under-19 World Cup in Australia. Making his Youth One Day International (YODI) debut during the tournament against New Zealand Under-19s, Smith went on to play a further five YODIs during the tournament, scoring 88 runs at an average of 17.60, and a high score of 34, as well as taking 12 wickets at a bowling average of 17.25, with best figures of 4/45.

Having played for the Glamorgan Second XI since 2011, Glamorgan officially added Smith to their playing staff in 2013 with a development contract. It was however for Scotland that Smith made his debut in senior cricket, during a List A match in the 2013 Yorkshire Bank 40 against Durham. In a heavy seven wicket defeat for Scotland, Smith was dismissed for a third-ball duck by Paul Collingwood, while in Durham's chase he bowled 2.5 wicketless overs, which conceded 32 runs.

He played four further matches for the Scottish Saltires in 2013, his best performance being against Surrey at The Oval where he had figures of 3 for 48, also completing two catches and a run out.

He made his debut for Glamorgan in the County Championship against Kent in September 2013, taking the wicket of Brendan Nash with his first ball. He went on to play the remaining two County Championship games making useful contributions with the bat and ball.

In December 2013 he signed a two-year contract with Glamorgan allowing him to play cricket while studying for a mathematics degree at the University of Bristol.

In 2014 Smith was a regular member of the Glamorgan county championship side, making his maiden first class 50 at Bristol in June. Unfortunately a stress fracture of his foot curtailed his season.

In 2015 appearances in early season fixtures was hampered by his university studies and a hamstring injury. His first championship game was against Northamptonshire at the end of May where he participated in a Glamorgan batting recovery which added 221 runs for the last 4 wickets in just 37 overs, finishing on 49 not out.

In 2016 Smith completed his degree and signed a new contract extending his time at Glamorgan to the end of the 2019 season. The 2016 and 2017 seasons were again hampered by injuries.

In 2018 Smith played regularly in the Glamorgan T20 side recording the most economical spell by a Glamorgan bowler in this competition with 4 overs, 1 maiden, 4 wickets for 6 runs in a win over Middlesex at Old Deer Park, suitably enough the home of London Welsh RFC.

In January 2019 he was named in Scotland's Twenty20 International (T20I) squad for the 2018–19 Oman Quadrangular Series. He made his T20I debut for Scotland against the Netherlands on 13 February 2019. Following the T20 tournament Scotland played three list A games against Oman and in the first of these Smith took 4 for 7 as Oman were dismissed for just 24. However the 2019 home season was again interrupted by injuries.

In January 2020 it was announced that Smith had re-signed for Glamorgan until the end of the 2021 season.

The 2020 season was severely curtailed by COVID and did not start until 1 August. Unfortunately Smith injured a hamstring on day 1 of the opening game against Somerset, having taken 3 wickets. He returned for the second half of the T20 campaign, helping Glamorgan to 3 wins from their last 6 games. 2021 was another season interrupted by injuries.

He was released by Glamorgan at the end of the 2022 season having had further problems with recurrent injuries which restricted him to just one list A game that season. He was then resigned in May 2023 on a short-term deal for the Blast.
