= Craig Meschede =

German cricketer

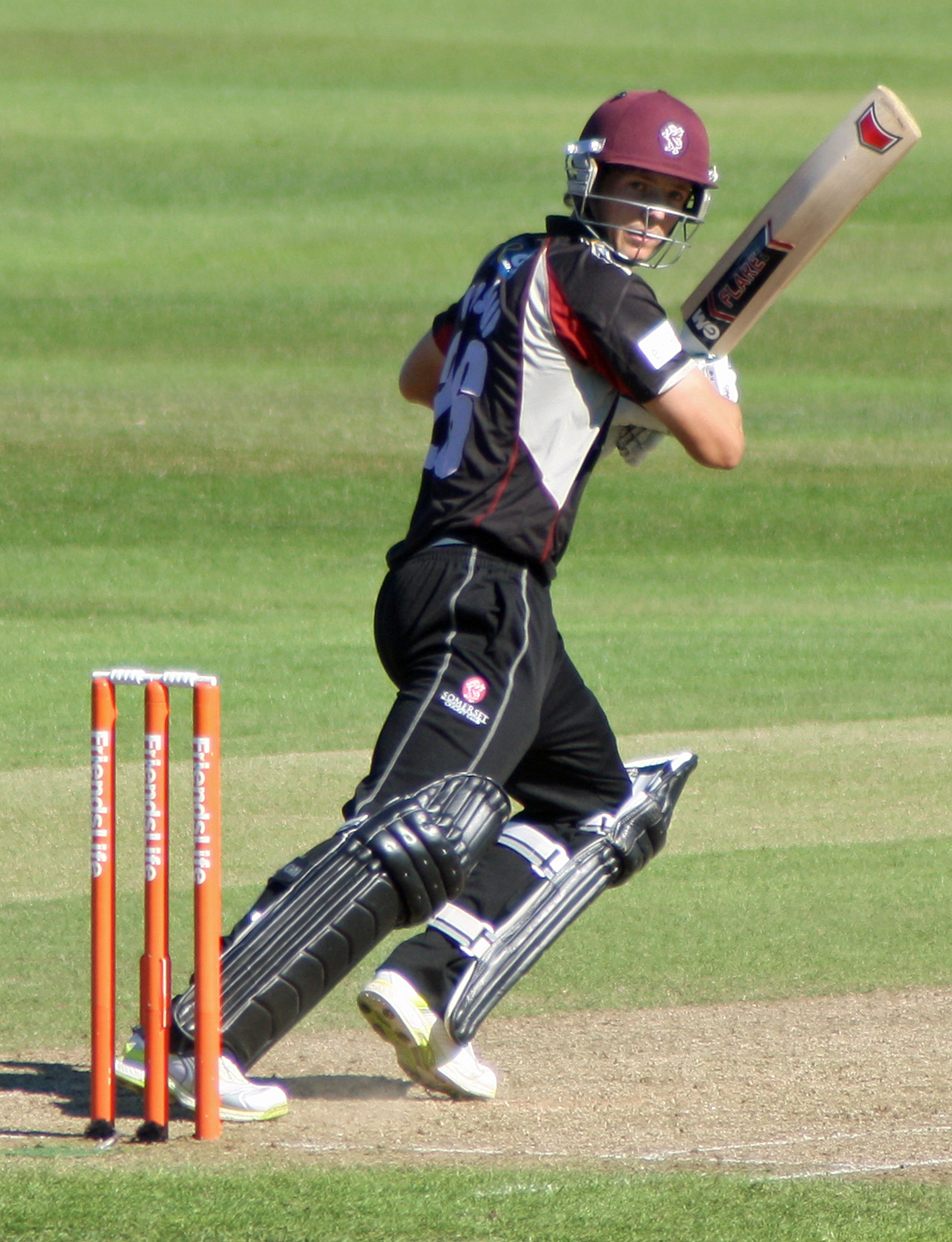

Personal information
- Full name: Craig Anthony Joseph Meschede
- Born: 21 November 1991 (age 34); Johannesburg, Transvaal Province, South Africa
- Batting: Right-handed
- Bowling: Right-arm medium-fast
- Role: All-rounder

International information
- National side: Germany (2019-present)
- T20I debut (cap 18): 15 June 2019 v Guernsey
- Last T20I: 20 June 2019 v Jersey

Domestic team information
- Years: Team
- 2011–2016: Somerset (squad no. 26)
- 2015: → Glamorgan (on loan)
- 2016–2019: Glamorgan (squad no. 44)

Career statistics
| Competition | T20I | FC | LA | T20 |
|---|---|---|---|---|
| Matches | 5 | 70 | 55 | 96 |
| Runs scored | 179 | 2,250 | 472 | 1,011 |
| Batting average | 44.75 | 25.56 | 13.88 | 18.72 |
| 100s/50s | 0/1 | 2/13 | 0/0 | 0/3 |
| Top score | 67 | 107 | 45 | 77* |
| Balls bowled | 120 | 8,866 | 1,995 | 1,190 |
| Wickets | 6 | 142 | 52 | 60 |
| Bowling average | 19.16 | 37.39 | 35.61 | 27.73 |
| 5 wickets in innings | 0 | 1 | 0 | 0 |
| 10 wickets in match | 0 | 0 | 0 | 0 |
| Best bowling | 2/11 | 5/84 | 4/5 | 3/9 |
| Catches/stumpings | 1/– | 23/– | 12/– | 17/– |
- Source: Cricinfo, 20 June 2019

Craig Anthony Joseph Meschede (born 21 November 1991) is a South African-born German cricketer. An all-rounder, he bowls right-arm medium-fast, and bats right-handed.

He made his debut for Somerset County Cricket Club in the 2011 Caribbean Twenty20, and played regular Twenty20 cricket for the county during the 2011 English domestic season. He also made occasional appearances in both first-class and one-day cricket. He received modest media coverage when he claimed the wicket of Indian batting great Sachin Tendulkar as his first in first-class cricket. Although he was born in South Africa, in May 2019, he was selected to represent the Germany national team.

Meschede's career was cut short by injury at the age of 28, due to suffering from a neurogenic thoracic outlet syndrome. However, in September 2021, he was selected to play for the German national team.

== Life and career ==
=== England ===
Meschede was born in Johannesburg, South Africa to a German father. He attended King's College, Taunton, where he played a number of good innings. On the completion of his A-Levels, he signed a two-year contract with Somerset County Cricket Club, eligible to play as a non-overseas player due to his German passport. He made his debut for Somerset along with five other players during their opening match of the 2010–11 Caribbean Twenty20, when Somerset were missing a number of key players. Meschede was run out for one run in the match, which Somerset lost narrowly. He managed more runs in the remaining three matches of the competition, and finished with 55 runs in the tournament at an average of 27.50. He began the 2011 English domestic season playing for Somerset's second team, but got an opportunity in the middle of May for the first team, being selected for the Clydesdale Bank 40 match against Lancashire. He was not required to bat or bowl on his one-day debut, but was picked for the County Championship match during the same week. Facing Sussex, he scored 18 and 15 not out in an eight wicket loss for Somerset. After these matches, he returned to the second team until the middle of June, when he was called up for a Twenty20 match. He made a few appearances low in the order, but his best performance came when he batted at number three against Glamorgan, when he scored 53. He enjoyed little success with the bat in his other matches, irrespective of his position in the batting order, and finished with a batting average of 15.62 in the competition; his 53 being his only half-century. He enjoyed some modest successes as a bowler: against Essex, he took three wickets in just nine balls, during a match in which Essex were bowled out for 82 runs; Somerset won the match by 143 runs. In the competition as a whole, he was bowled sparingly, bowling just 63 balls, but his bowling average; 13.66 was second on the team behind Arul Suppiah.

He claimed his maiden first-class wicket against the touring Indians, taking the wicket of Sachin Tendulkar. He played more regularly for Somerset towards the end of the 2011 season, when the side was affected by injuries, and scored his debut half-century in first-class cricket in the second innings of the match against Hampshire, reaching 53.

On 18 November 2014, Meschede joined Glamorgan County Cricket Club on a season long loan for the 2015 season. On 21 April 2015, Meschede scored a career best and a match-saving 101 against Surrey in the county championship. On 25 January 2016, Meschede joined Glamorgan permanently on a three-year contract.

=== Germany ===
In February 2019, Meschede attended a training camp with the German national cricket team, with the view to help Germany qualify via the Regional Finals of the 2018–19 ICC World Twenty20 Europe Qualifier group for the 2020 ICC T20 World Cup. In May 2019, he was named in Germany's squad for the Regional Finals of the 2018–19 ICC T20 World Cup Europe Qualifier tournament in Guernsey. He made his Twenty20 International (T20I) debut for Germany, against Guernsey, on 15 June 2019. He finished the tournament as the leading run-scorer, with 179 runs.

=== Injury, retirement and return ===
In June 2020, Meschede announced his retirement at the age of 28 from professional cricket with immediate effect due to injury. He had been living with a neurogenic thoracic outlet syndrome since mid-way through 2019, limiting his shoulder mobility and strength. After months of rehabilitation work Meschede took the advice of specialists to retire from the game.

However, in September 2021, he was named in Germany's T20I squad for the Regional Final of the 2021 ICC Men's T20 World Cup Europe Qualifier tournament.
