= Alex Hughes (cricketer) =

English cricketer

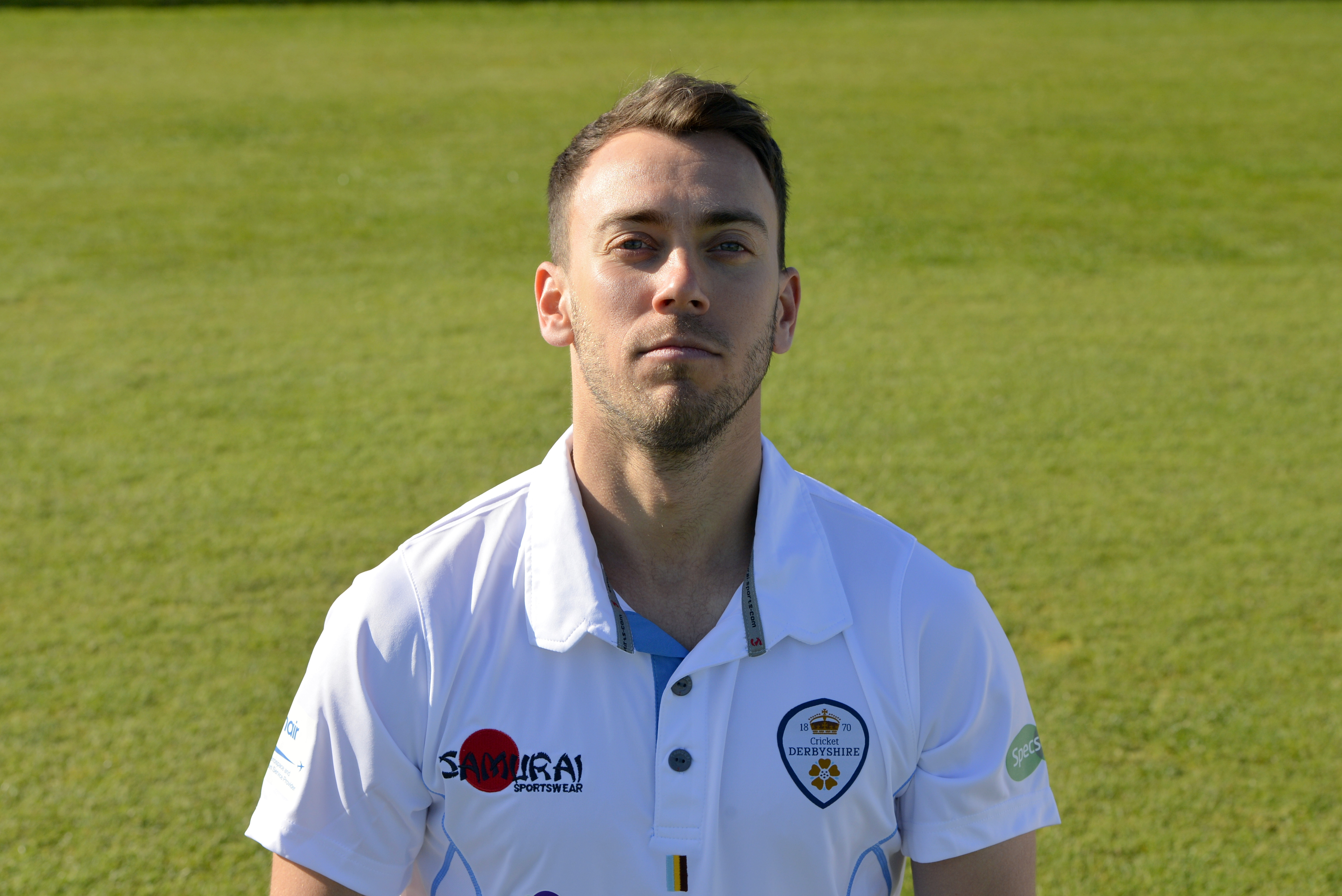

Personal information
- Full name: Alex Lloyd Hughes
- Born: 29 September 1991 (age 35); Wordsley, West Midlands, England
- Batting: Right-handed
- Bowling: Right-arm medium
- Role: All-rounder

Domestic team information
- Years: Team
- 2009: Staffordshire
- 2011–2022: Derbyshire (squad no. 18)
- First-class debut: 2 August 2013 Derbyshire v Sussex
- List A debut: 4 June 2012 Derbyshire v Warwickshire

Career statistics
Competition	FC	LA	T20
Matches	79	73	100
Runs scored	3,483	937	957
Batting average	27.64	21.79	16.78
100s/50s	6/13	0/3	0/0
Top score	142	96*	43*
Balls bowled	3,753	2,045	1,595
Wickets	37	43	60
Bowling average	52.45	44.55	36.36
5 wickets in innings	0	0	0
10 wickets in match	0	0	0
Best bowling	4/46	3/21	4/42
Catches/stumpings	55/–	30/–	39/–
- Source: ESPNcricinfo, 2 October 2022

Alex Lloyd Hughes (born 29 September 1991) is a retired English cricketer. He was a right-handed batsman who bowled right-arm medium pace. Born in Wordsley, West Midlands, he played county cricket for Derbyshire between 2011 and 2022.

== Career ==
Hughes played two matches for Staffordshire in the 2009 Minor Counties Championship against Norfolk and Cumberland. Having played for the Derbyshire Second XI since 2009, Hughes made his full debut for Derbyshire in a Twenty20 match against Yorkshire in the 2011 Friends Provident t20, scoring an unbeaten 11 runs and bowling three wicket-less overs. Hughes did not feature in any further matches for Derbyshire in the 2011 season.

Hughes made his first-class debut against Sussex County Cricket Club at Hove in August 2013. He went on to hit his maiden first-class hundred against Northamptonshire in July 2015, scoring 111* in a first innings score of 361. Derbyshire went on to win the match by 7 wickets. At the start of the 2016 season, Hughes deputised as Derbyshire captain in the Natwest T20 blast in place of the injured Wes Durston. On 2 September 2016, Hughes scored his second first-class hundred against Gloucestershire, scoring 140 in the second innings of the match.

Hughes retired from cricket at the end of the 2022 season, after an eleven-year career with Derbyshire, to take a up an analyst and support coaching role with the club.
