= Ian Blackwell =

English cricketer & umpire (born 1978)

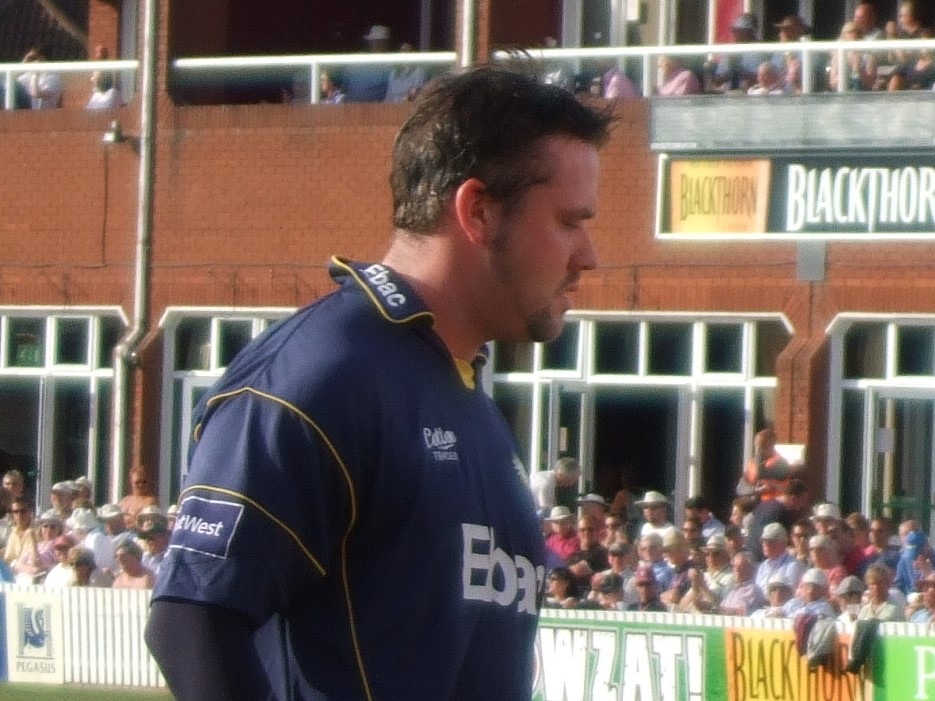

Personal information
- Full name: Ian David Blackwell
- Born: 10 June 1978 (age 48); Chesterfield, Derbyshire, England
- Nickname: Blackie, Blackdog, Donkey, Le Donk
- Height: 6 ft 2 in (1.88 m)
- Batting: Left-handed
- Bowling: Slow left-arm orthodox
- Role: All-rounder

International information
- National side: England (2002–2006)
- Only Test (cap 629): 1 March 2006 v India
- ODI debut (cap 170): 18 September 2002 v Zimbabwe
- Last ODI: 15 April 2006 v India
- ODI shirt no.: 37

Domestic team information
- Years: Team
- 1997–1999: Derbyshire
- 2000–2008: Somerset
- 2009–2012: Durham
- 2010/11: Central Districts
- 2012: → Warwickshire (on loan)

Umpiring information
- WODIs umpired: 1 (2026–present)
- WT20Is umpired: 6 (2021–present)
- FC umpired: 106 (2015–present)
- LA umpired: 53 (2015–present)
- T20 umpired: 119 (2015–present)

Career statistics
| Competition | Test | ODI | FC | LA |
|---|---|---|---|---|
| Matches | 1 | 34 | 210 | 254 |
| Runs scored | 4 | 403 | 11,595 | 5,765 |
| Batting average | 4.00 | 14.92 | 39.57 | 27.19 |
| 100s/50s | 0/0 | 0/1 | 27/64 | 3/34 |
| Top score | 4 | 82 | 247* | 134* |
| Balls bowled | 114 | 1,230 | 31,618 | 8,885 |
| Wickets | 0 | 24 | 398 | 207 |
| Bowling average | – | 36.54 | 35.91 | 34.30 |
| 5 wickets in innings | – | 0 | 14 | 1 |
| 10 wickets in match | – | 0 | 0 | 0 |
| Best bowling | – | 3/26 | 7/52 | 5/26 |
| Catches/stumpings | 0/– | 3/– | 66/– | 64/– |
- Source: ESPNcricinfo, 5 October 2026

Ian David Blackwell (born 10 June 1978) is an English cricket umpire and retired professional cricketer. A left-arm orthodox spinner and powerful middle-order batsman, he played for England at One Day International (ODI) and Test level, and most recently played county cricket for Warwickshire in the second half of the 2012 season. He was born at Chesterfield in Derbyshire.

== Domestic career ==
=== Somerset County Cricket Club ===
Blackwell started off his career at Derbyshire, before moving to Somerset in 2000 following a dispute with Derbyshire captain Dominic Cork. He was appointed captain of Somerset for the last part of the 2005 season after the departure of Graeme Smith. Having been appointed official captain for 2006, he had shoulder surgery and missed almost all of the season.

=== Durham County Cricket Club ===
After the 2008 season, Blackwell left Somerset and joined Durham. Blackwell's struggles with fitness and disagreements with the captain, Justin Langer, were also factors in his departure from Somerset. Blackwell managed to lose 10 kg (22 lb) over the winter. On his first-class debut for Durham, in the opening match of the 2009 English season, Blackwell scored a century against the Marylebone Cricket Club, featuring a bowling line up including England hopefuls Sajid Mahmood, Kabir Ali, Tim Bresnan, and Adil Rashid. Blackwell went on to have a productive season in 2009, scoring 801 runs at 40.05 and taking 43 wickets at 23.53 as Durham won the County Championship for the second successive year.

=== Warwickshire County Cricket Club ===
Entering the 2012 season, having been afflicted by a second shoulder operation, Blackwell played few matches in the first half of the season for Durham. The county then agreed to loan him from August to Warwickshire, who required coverage for the four-week absence of spinner Jeetan Patel. He arrived at Warwickshire in time to be part of another team which clinched a County Championship.

In January 2013, Durham terminated Blackwell's contract leading to his retirement from professional cricket in March 2013. After a third shoulder operation over the winter, Blackwell had been diagnosed with arthritis in his left shoulder.

== International career ==
Blackwell made his one-day international debut for England in the 2002 ICC Champions Trophy.

Blackwell was called up for the England Test squad after Ashley Giles had to withdraw from the 2006 tour to India. After impressing in warm-up matches, he was selected for the 1st Test against India on 1 March in Nagpur. However, he was not frequently used by captain Andrew Flintoff, only bowling six fairly expensive overs in the first Indian innings, in comparison to fellow left arm spinner Monty Panesar's 42 overs. In the second Indian innings, Blackwell was initially more economical but as India went on an audacious chase of the huge total set to them by England, he was brought on to prevent the batsmen from scoring quickly, but conceded 18 runs in his first over. This came after a nervous innings of only 4 in his only opportunity with the bat, and Blackwell was subsequently dropped for the second Test, replaced by Liam Plunkett.

Blackwell remained first choice spinner for the One Day International (ODI) series however. Although England lost the series 5–1, Blackwell's performances were encouraging and seemed to indicate he was ready to hold down a regular place in the team. Ten overs in the first ODI went for just 24 runs at the same time as picking up one wicket, his cheapest ever spell in an ODI, while he also picked up figures of 2–39 and 2–21. Blackwell looked set to make another Test match appearance against Sri Lanka, but suffered a shoulder injury which derailed his season. As a consequence he was replaced as spinner in England's ODI team, and was subsequently overlooked by the selectors.

His highest ODI score of 82 came in his second match in 2002 against India, and his best ODI bowling figures were 3-26 against Australia in 2003.

== Umpiring career ==
While still playing, Blackwell got his first taste of umpiring, taking control of a handful of local matches in Durham. After retiring in 2013, Blackwell turned his full attention to umpiring, initially officiating in Minor County and Second XI cricket. In December 2014 Blackwell was added to ECB's reserve list of first-class umpires. Blackwell made his debut in First-class cricket in April 2015 in a match between Somerset and Durham MCC University at Taunton. He umpired his first match in the County Championship in April 2016.

== See also ==
- One-Test wonder

Sporting positions
| Preceded by Graeme Smith | Somerset County Cricket Captain; 2005–2006 | Succeeded by Justin Langer |
