= Kent County Cricket Club in 2010 =

Kent County Cricket Club
2010 season
- Coach: (England) Paul Farbrace
- Captain: (England) Rob Key
- Overseas players: (Sri Lanka) Malinga Bandara (May–September) (South Africa) Makhaya Ntini (April–May)
- Ground(s): St Lawrence Ground, Canterbury; Nevill Ground, Tunbridge Wells; County Ground, Beckenham
- County Championship: 8th, Division One (relegated)
- Clydesdale Bank 40: 2nd, Group C
- Friends Provident t20: 7th, South Group
- Most runs: FC: M van Jaarsveld (1,188); LA: JL Denly (467); T20: M van Jaarsveld (421)
- Most wickets: FC: JC Tredwell (38); A Khan (38); LA: MT Coles (14); T20: SJ Cook (21)
- Most catches: FC: M van Jaarsveld (36); LA: M van Jaarsveld (6); T20: AJ Blake (9)
- Most wicket-keeping dismissals: FC: GO Jones (55); LA: GO Jones (11); T20: GO Jones (10)

In 2010, Kent County Cricket Club competed in Division One of the County Championship, Group C of the 40-over Clydesdale Bank 40 and the South Group of the Friends Provident t20. Kent also hosted three-day first-class matches at the St Lawrence Ground against Loughborough MCCU and the touring Pakistanis. It was the first season in charge for Director of Cricket Paul Farbrace. The club captain was former England batsman Rob Key who had been club captain since 2006. Kent's overseas players were South African fast bowler Makhaya Ntini until late May, and Sri Lankan leg-spinner Malinga Bandara for the rest of the season.

Kent were relegated from Division One of the County Championship in their first season since promotion from Division Two. They finished second in Group C of the Clydesdale Bank 40 and seventh in the South Group of the Friends Provident t20 (they did not progress to the knock-out stages of either competition).

== Squad ==
It was announced in December 2009 that former South Africa batsman Justin Kemp would not return for the 2010 season due to changes to the Kolpak regulations under which he had been able to play county cricket since 2005. Kent had already lost fast bowler Martin Saggers after 11 seasons, when the player announced his retirement at the end of the 2009 season due to a serious knee injury.

In January, Kent announced that their overseas player would be Australian fast bowler Stuart Clark for the first half of the season, followed by Sri Lankan leg-spinner Malinga Bandara for the second half of the season. Clark had previously signed to play for Kent in the 2009 season, but later withdrew due to a late call up to the Australian tour of South Africa. However, in March 2010 it was announced that, for a second time, Clark would not play for the county – this time due to concerns about his fitness. A week later, Kent announced the signing of South African fast bowler Makhaya Ntini as a replacement for Clark. Ntini signed a five-week deal to play until Bandara arrived in late May.

South African-born Scotland international, Dewald Nel, signed a two-year contract with Kent in March 2010 after impressing while on trial.

Leg-spin bowler Mark Lawson signed for Kent during the season and played a single match (against the touring Pakistanis), but was later released.

In late July, Kent released slow left-arm spinner Rob Ferley 22 year-old medium-fast bowler Warren Lee. Lee would go on to play for the Unicorns (cricket team) in 2012 and 2013. A few days later, Kent released James Hockley from his second spell with the county. Hockley would now concentrate on his teaching career. Phil Edwards was released in late August.

Fast bowler Amjad Khan left Kent at the end of the 2010 season to join Sussex, having been at the county since 2001. Second XI wicket-keeper Paul Dixey also left after the end of the season and signed for Leicestershire.

=== Squad list ===
- Ages given as of the first day of the County Championship season, 9 April 2010.

Name	Nationality	Birth date	Batting style	Bowling style	Notes
Batsmen
Alex Blake	England	25 January 1989 (aged 21)	Left-handed	Right arm medium-fast	
Joe Denly	England	16 March 1986 (aged 24)	Right-handed	Right arm leg break	
James Goodman	England	19 November 1990 (aged 19)	Right-handed	Right arm medium	
James Hockley	England	16 April 1979 (aged 30)	Right-handed	Right arm off break	Released in August
Rob Key	England	12 May 1979 (aged 30)	Right-handed	Right arm off break	Club captain
Sam Northeast	England	16 October 1989 (aged 20)	Right-handed	Right arm off break	
Chris Piesley	England	12 February 1992 (aged 18)	Left-handed	Right arm off break	
Martin van Jaarsveld	South Africa	18 June 1974 (aged 35)	Right-handed	Right arm medium / Right arm off break	Kolpak player, vice-captain
All-rounders
Azhar Mahmood	Pakistan	28 February 1975 (aged 35)	Right-handed	Right arm fast-medium	British citizen
Adam Ball	England	1 March 1993 (aged 17)	Right-handed	Left arm fast-medium	
Matt Coles	England	26 May 1990 (aged 19)	Left-handed	Right arm fast-medium	
Paul Muchall	England	17 March 1987 (aged 23)	Right-handed	Right arm medium-fast	Brief spell in September
Darren Stevens	England	30 April 1976 (aged 33)	Right-handed	Right arm medium	
Wicket-keepers
Paul Dixey	England	2 November 1987 (aged 22)	Right-handed	—	
Geraint Jones	England	14 July 1979 (aged 30)	Right-handed	—	
Bowlers
Malinga Bandara	Sri Lanka	31 December 1979 (aged 30)	Right-handed	Right arm Leg spin	Overseas player (from late May)
Simon Cook	England	15 January 1977 (aged 33)	Right-handed	Right arm medium-fast	
Phil Edwards	England	16 April 1984 (aged 25)	Right-handed	Right arm fast-medium	Released in August
Rob Ferley	England	4 February 1982 (aged 28)	Right-handed	Slow left arm orthodox	Released in July
Robbie Joseph	England	20 January 1982 (aged 28)	Right-handed	Right arm fast	
Amjad Khan	England	14 October 1980 (aged 29)	Right-handed	Right arm fast-medium	
Mark Lawson	England	24 October 1985 (aged 24)	Right-handed	Right arm Leg spin	
Warren Lee	England	27 August 1987 (aged 22)	Right-handed	Right arm medium-fast	Released in July
Dewald Nel	Scotland	6 June 1980 (aged 29)	Right-handed	Right arm medium-fast	
Makhaya Ntini	South Africa	6 July 1979 (aged 30)	Right-handed	Right arm fast	Overseas player (April–May)
Ashley Shaw	England	15 April 1991 (aged 18)	Right-handed	Left arm fast-medium	
James Tredwell	England	27 February 1982 (aged 28)	Left-handed	Right arm off break	

== County Championship ==
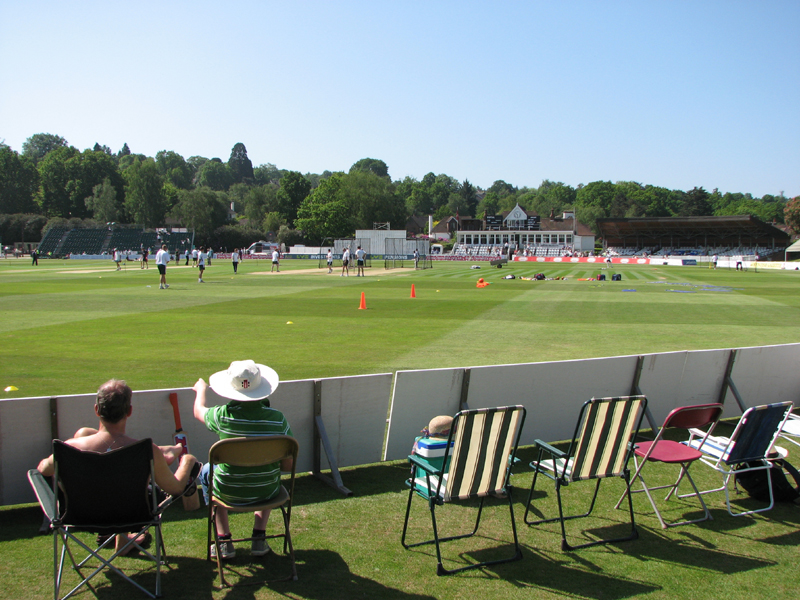
Kent v Notts at Nevill Ground, 4 June 2010

Kent were relegated from Division One, despite a victory over Yorkshire in their final match. James Tredwell took a hat-trick in the second innings of that match on his way to figures of 7/22, to end the title hopes of their opponents who had needed a win.

Other highlights included Darren Stevens scoring 197 against Nottinghamshire in a drawn match in early June.

=== Division One ===
Team	Pld	W	L	D	T	A	Bat	Bwl	Ded	Pts
Nottinghamshire (C)	16	7	5	4	0	0	47	43	0	214
Somerset	16	6	2	8	0	0	53	41	0	214
Yorkshire	16	6	2	8	0	0	41	42	0	203
Lancashire	16	5	3	8	0	0	35	43	0	182
Durham	16	5	3	8	0	0	30	39	0	173
Warwickshire	16	6	9	1	0	0	20	47	0	166
Hampshire	16	3	6	7	0	0	47	41	0	157
Kent (R)	16	3	7	6	0	0	42	44	1	151
Essex (R)	16	2	6	8	0	0	29	43	2	126

=== Matches ===
15–17 April	Nottinghamshire (H)	v	Kent	Nottinghamshire won by an innings and 32 runs
Scorecard	456 (111.4 overs); HM Amla 129 (203); A Khan 3/108 (25 overs)		200 (62 overs); Azhar Mahmood 52 (56); AR Adams 4/63 (18 overs)	Trent Bridge, Nottingham; Umpires: RK Illingworth and P Willey
Scorecard			224 (65.4 overs) (f/o); DI Stevens 42* (59); SR Patel 3/24 (6.4 overs)	Trent Bridge, Nottingham; Umpires: RK Illingworth and P Willey
Kent won the toss and elected to field; Points: Nottinghamshire 24, Kent 4

21–24 April	Kent (H)	v	Yorkshire	Match drawn
Scorecard	317 (97.2 overs); DI Stevens 92 (125); TT Bresnan 5/52 (24.2 overs)		283 (97.3 overs); JM Bairstow 70 (172); Azhar Mahmood 4/58 (21.3 overs)	St Lawrence Ground, Canterbury; Umpires: NGB Cook and DJ Millns
Scorecard	357/8d (92 overs); JB Hockley 82 (152); TT Bresnan 2/33 (18 overs)		300/5 (84 overs); A Lyth 84 (162); JC Tredwell 3/69 (29 overs)	St Lawrence Ground, Canterbury; Umpires: NGB Cook and DJ Millns
Kent won the toss and elected to bat; Points: Kent 9, Yorkshire 8

27–30 April	Lancashire (H)	v	Kent	Match drawn
Scorecard	320 (97.3 overs); AG Prince 115 (213); DI Stevens 4/44 (20 overs)		213 (60.5 overs); DI Stevens 101* (129); SI Mahmood 5/55 (18.5 overs)	Old Trafford, Manchester; Umpires: NL Bainton and NJ Llong
Scorecard	177/3d (43 overs); AG Prince 71* (89); M Ntini 2/31 (11 overs)		45/2 (11.5 overs); RWT Key 19* (30); SI Mahmood 2/21 (5.5 overs)	Old Trafford, Manchester; Umpires: NL Bainton and NJ Llong
Kent won the toss and elected to field; Points: Lancashire 9, Kent 6 (Kent were deducted 1 point for a slow over rate) M Ntini made his first appearance for Kent

4–7 May	Warwickshire	v	(H) Kent	Warwickshire won by 44 runs
Scorecard	250 (80.4 overs); IJL Trott 67 (128); MT Coles 4/55 (14 overs)		377 (109.3 overs); JL Denly 95 (192); R Clarke 6/63 (15.3 overs)	St Lawrence Ground, Canterbury; Umpires: B Dudleston and NA Mallender
Scorecard	327 (118.5 overs); IR Bell 94 (182); A Khan 3/63 (20 overs)		156 (59.3 overs); M van Jaarsveld 59 (90); Imran Tahir 4/27 (16 overs)	St Lawrence Ground, Canterbury; Umpires: B Dudleston and NA Mallender
Kent won the toss and elected to field; Points: Kent 7, Warwickshire 21

10–13 May	Kent	v	(H) Essex	Match drawn
Scorecard	474 (119.2 overs); GO Jones 135 (177); RN ten Doeschate 4/77 (17.2 overs)		341 (108.2 overs); T Westley 132 (240); Azhar Mahmood 5/63 (25.2 overs)	County Ground, Chelmsford; Umpires: NGC Cowley and DJ Millns
Scorecard	204 (63 overs); SA Northeast 71 (131); Danish Kaneria 4/68 (24 overs)		254/4 (81.4 overs); AN Cook 72 (159); JL Denly 2/100 (27 overs)	County Ground, Chelmsford; Umpires: NGC Cowley and DJ Millns
Kent won the toss and elected to bat; Points: Essex 8, Kent 11

17–20 May	Kent (H)	v	Durham	Durham won by 6 wickets
Scorecard	424 (93.4 overs); RWT Key 261 (270); SJ Harmison 4/52 (18 overs)		418 (119.4 overs); BA Stokes 161 (202); M Ntini 5/84 (29 overs)	St Lawrence Ground, Canterbury; Umpires: PJ Hartley and TE Jesty; Player of the match: BA Stokes (Durham)
Scorecard	162 (49.5 overs); M van Jaarsveld 44 (82); ID Blackwell 3/35 (11 overs)		172/4 (34 overs); ID Blackwell 53* (60); A Khan 1/6 (3 overs)	St Lawrence Ground, Canterbury; Umpires: PJ Hartley and TE Jesty; Player of the match: BA Stokes (Durham)
Kent won the toss and elected to bat; Points: Kent 7, Durham 23

24–25 May	Durham (H)	v	Kent	Kent won by an innings and 4 runs
Scorecard	121 (34.5 overs); BA Stokes 27 (32); A Khan 5/43 (11.5 overs)		320 (63 overs); DI Stevens 102 (110); ME Claydon 3/50 (15 overs)	Riverside Ground, Chester-le-Street; Umpires: NL Bainton and RA Kettleborough
Scorecard	195 (54.3 overs); MJ Di Venuto 86 (158); M Ntini 6/51 (17.3 overs)			Riverside Ground, Chester-le-Street; Umpires: NL Bainton and RA Kettleborough
Durham won the toss and elected to bat; Points: Kent 22, Durham 3 JC Tredwell replaced AJ Blake after day 1

4–7 June	Nottinghamshire	v	(H) Kent	Match drawn
Scorecard	462 (124 overs); CMW Read 112* (177); SJ Cook 4/85 (22.0 overs)		570 (148.1 overs); DI Stevens 197 (238); AR Adams 5/106 (31 overs)	Nevill Ground, Tunbridge Wells; Umpires: JH Evans and NJ Llong
Scorecard	210/3d (62 overs); SR Patel 76* (186); MT Coles 1/35 (8 overs)			Nevill Ground, Tunbridge Wells; Umpires: JH Evans and NJ Llong
Nottinghamshire on the toss and elected to bat; Points: Kent 10, Nottinghamshire 9

5–7 July	Kent	v	(H) Hampshire	Hampshire won by an innings and 111 runs
Scorecard	251 (80.2 overs); JL Denly 67 (153); DG Cork 5/50 (22.2)		553/7d (145 overs); MA Carberry 158 (260); SJ Cook 2/95 (29 overs)	Rose Bowl, Southampton; Umpires: JH Evans and DJ Millns
Scorecard	191 (60.2 overs); M van Jaarsveld 82* (158); DG Cork 2/16 (12 overs)			Rose Bowl, Southampton; Umpires: JH Evans and DJ Millns
Kent won the toss and elected to bat; Points: Hampshire 24, Kent 3

20–23 July	Somerset (H)	v	Kent	Match drawn
Scorecard	205 (49.4 overs); Z de Bruyn 44 (71); DI Stevens 4/38 (13 overs)		172 (45 overs); JL Denly 34 (63); M Kartik 5/50 (14 overs)	County Ground, Taunton; Umpires: NL Bainton and MA Gough
Scorecard	301/7d (54 overs); ME Trescothick 80 (101); MT Coles 3/73 (13 overs)		191/7 (74.4 overs); GO Jones 47 (150); M Kartik 5/57 (31 overs)	County Ground, Taunton; Umpires: NL Bainton and MA Gough
Kent won the toss and elected to field; Points: Somerset 7, Kent 6

29 July – 1 August	Kent (H)	v	Essex	Kent won by 99 runs
Scorecard	420 (115.3 overs); M van Jaarsveld 106 (152); BE McGain 5/151 (33.3 overs)		279 (102.2 overs); ML Pettini 88 (246); HMCM Bandara 3/44 (12.2 overs)	St Lawrence Ground, Canterbury; Umpires: B Dudleston and IA Gould
Scorecard	135 (47.4 overs); JC Tredwell 40 (84); A Carter 5/40 (17.4 overs)		177 (59.5 overs); MJ Walker 35 (66); Azhar Mahmood 5/62 (21 overs)	St Lawrence Ground, Canterbury; Umpires: B Dudleston and IA Gould
Kent won the toss and elected to bat; Points: Kent 24, Essex 4

3–6 August	Somerset	v	(H) Kent	Match drawn
Scorecard	380 (103.4 overs); JC Hildreth 151 (188); Azhar Mahmood 3/65 (22 overs)		372 (98.2 overs); GO Jones 178 (248); BJ Phillips 5/72 (28 overs)	St Lawrence Ground, Canterbury; Umpires: MJD Bodenham and RA Kettleborough
Scorecard	387/7d (127.2 overs); ME Trescothick 188* (392); JC Trewdwell 5/95 (42 overs)			St Lawrence Ground, Canterbury; Umpires: MJD Bodenham and RA Kettleborough
Somerset won the toss and elected to bat; Points: Kent 10, Somerset 10

18–21 August	Lancashire	v	(H) Kent	Lancashire won by 121 runs
Scorecard	266 (76 overs); SJ Croft 65 (108); DI Stevens 3/33 (14 overs)		249 (81.5 overs); JL Denly 69 (169); G Chapple 4/45 (23 overs)	St Lawrence Ground, Canterbury; Umpires: RK Illingworth and RT Robinson
Scorecard	321 (98.2 overs); S Chanderpaul 120 (234); SJ Cook 4/62 (20 overs)		217 (57.3 overs); MT Coles 51 (43); Gary Keedy 4/53 (10.3 overs)	St Lawrence Ground, Canterbury; Umpires: RK Illingworth and RT Robinson
Lancashire won the toss and elected to bat; Points: Lancashire 21, Kent 4

31 August – 2 September	Warwickshire (H)	v	Kent	Warwickshire won by 95 runs
Scorecard	294 (84.4 overs); AG Botha 76 (138); MT Coles 3/49 (17.4 overs)		111 (31.3 overs); AJ Blake 33 (40); CR Woakes 6/52 (14 overs)	Edgbaston, Birmingham; Umpires: JW Lloyds and JF Steele
Scorecard	140 (33.1 overs); CR Woakes 51 (41); DI Stevens 4/38 (13 overs)		228 (60.1 overs); M van Jaarsveld 110* (160); CR Woakes 5/45 (15 overs)	Edgbaston, Birmingham; Umpires: JW Lloyds and JF Steele
Warwickshire won the toss and elected to bat; Points: Warwickshire 21, Kent 3

7–10 September	Hampshire	v	(H) Kent	Hampshire won by 130 runs
Scorecard	204 (81.5 overs); JHK Adams 84 (222); HMCM Bandara 4/42 (16.5 overs)		182 (68.4 overs); JL Denly 42 (114); JA Tomlinson 4/59 (21 overs)	St Lawrence Ground, Canterbury; Umpires: RJ Bailey and NGC Cowley
Scorecard	355/9d (103.2 overs); JM Vince 68* (92); HMCM Bandara 4/99 (28.2 overs)		247 (86 overs); SA Northeast 71 (186); DG Cork 4/43 (18 overs)	St Lawrence Ground, Canterbury; Umpires: RJ Bailey and NGC Cowley
Hampshire won the toss and elected to bat; Points: Kent 3, Hampshire 20

13–16 September	Yorkshire	v	(H) Kent	Kent won by 4 wickets
Scorecard	261 (76.3 overs); JM Bairstow 64 (105); JD Nel 6/62 (25 overs)		302 (81.5 overs); AJ Blake 105* (143); MA Ashraf 5/32 (18 overs)	Headingley, Leeds; Umpires: JH Evans and NA Mallender
Scorecard	130 (29.5 overs); A Lyth 46 (70); JC Tredwell 7/22 (6.5 overs)		90/6 (24.5 overs); M van Jaarsveld 44 (72); SA Patterson 2/10 (6 overs)	Headingley, Leeds; Umpires: JH Evans and NA Mallender
Kent won the toss and elected to field; Points: Yorkshire 5, Kent 22

== Other first-class matches ==
=== MCCU match ===
10–12 April	Kent (H)	v	Loughborough MCCU	Match drawn
Scorecard	504/7d (103 overs); RWT Key 140 (144); RML Taylor 2/105 (19 overs)		259 (103.5 overs); D Murphy 76 (194); SJ Cook 3/24 (21 overs)	St Lawrence Ground, Canterbury; Umpires: RJ Bailey and G Sharp
Scorecard	212/7d (57.4 overs); JL Denly 106 (148); AS Welsh 3/32 (14.4 overs)		60/3 (28 overs); TS Winslade 17 (39); M van Jaarsveld 1/4 (3 overs)	St Lawrence Ground, Canterbury; Umpires: RJ Bailey and G Sharp
Kent won the toss and elected to bat; JD Nel made his first appearance for Kent

=== Tour match ===
28–30 June	Pakistanis	v	(H) Kent	Match drawn
Scorecard	360 (87 overs); Umar Akmal 153 (188); MAK Lawson 4/93 (16 overs)		259 (69 overs); JL Denly 106 (148) 63 (77); Mohammad Amir 5/54 (13 overs)	St Lawrence Ground, Canterbury; Umpires: MA Eggleston and JF Steele
Scorecard	264/4d (65 overs); Umar Amin 73 (126); MAK Lawson 2/71 (18 overs)		150/3 (28 overs); JL Denly 69 (76); Shoaib Malik 2/17 (5 overs)	St Lawrence Ground, Canterbury; Umpires: MA Eggleston and JF Steele
Pakistanis won the toss and elected to bat; JE Goodman and CD Piesley made their first-class debuts MAK Lawson made his first (and only) appearance for Kent

== Clydesdale Bank 40 ==
=== Group A ===
Team	Pld	W	L	T	N/R	Pts	Net R/R
Warwickshire Bears	12	9	3	0	0	18	+0.314
Kent Spitfires	12	7	3	0	2	16	+0.773
Nottinghamshire Outlaws	12	7	4	0	1	15	+0.348
Hampshire Hawks	12	6	6	0	0	12	+0.006
Durham Dynamos	12	5	6	0	1	11	+0.262
Leicestershire Foxes	12	4	8	0	0	8	−0.220
Scotland	12	2	10	0	0	4	−1.225

=== Matches ===
25 April	Kent (H); 246/6 (40 overs)	v	Warwickshire; 247/4 (37.5 overs)	Warwickshire won by 6 wickets (with 13 balls remaining)
Scorecard	Kent (H); 246/6 (40 overs)	v	Warwickshire; 247/4 (37.5 overs)	St Lawrence Ground, Canterbury; Umpires: NGB Cook and DJ Millns
Scorecard	JL Denly 80 (102); Imran Tahir 2/31 (6 overs)		IR Bell 88 (75); SJ Cook 1/20 (6 overs)	St Lawrence Ground, Canterbury; Umpires: NGB Cook and DJ Millns
Warwickshire won the toss and elected to field; Points: Kent 0, Warwickshire 2				St Lawrence Ground, Canterbury; Umpires: NGB Cook and DJ Millns

2 May	Kent (H)	v	Durham	No result (match abandoned without a toss)
Scorecard	Kent (H)	v	Durham	St Lawrence Ground, Canterbury; Umpires: RJ Bailey and RA Kettleborough
No toss; Points: Kent 1, Durham 1				St Lawrence Ground, Canterbury; Umpires: RJ Bailey and RA Kettleborough

8 May	Kent; 78/2 (6.1 overs)	v	(H) Durham	No result
Scorecard	Kent; 78/2 (6.1 overs)	v	(H) Durham	Trent Bridge, Nottingham; Umpires: JH Evans and NJ Llong
Scorecard	RWT Key 44 (18); SJ Mullaney 2/4 (1 over)			Trent Bridge, Nottingham; Umpires: JH Evans and NJ Llong
Nottinghamshire won the toss and elected to field; Match reduced to 10 overs per side and later stopped due to rain; Points: Nottinghamshire 1, Kent 1				Trent Bridge, Nottingham; Umpires: JH Evans and NJ Llong

16 May	Kent; 192/9 (40 overs)	v	(H) Warwickshire; 193/4 (35 overs)	Warwickshire won by 6 wickets (with 30 balls remaining)
Scorecard	Kent; 192/9 (40 overs)	v	(H) Warwickshire; 193/4 (35 overs)	Edgbaston, Birmingham; Umpires: SA Garratt and JW Lloyds
Scorecard	RWT Key 87 (98); WB Rankin 4/34 (7 overs)		IR Bell 55 (71); DI Stevens 1/15 (5 overs)	Edgbaston, Birmingham; Umpires: SA Garratt and JW Lloyds
Warwickshire won the toss and elected to field; Points: Warwickshire 2, Kent 0				Edgbaston, Birmingham; Umpires: SA Garratt and JW Lloyds

22 May	Scotland (H); 180/6 (40 overs)	v	Kent; 183/1 (30.2 overs)	Kent won by 9 wickets (with 56 balls remaining)
Scorecard	Scotland (H); 180/6 (40 overs)	v	Kent; 183/1 (30.2 overs)	The Grange, Edinburgh; Umpires: I Dawood and JW Lloyds
Scorecard	RD Berrington 68 (84); SJ Cook 3/39 (8 overs)		M van Jaarsveld 72 (62); RM Haq 1/33 (8 overs)	The Grange, Edinburgh; Umpires: I Dawood and JW Lloyds
Scotland won the toss and elected to bat; Points: Scotland 0, Kent 2				The Grange, Edinburgh; Umpires: I Dawood and JW Lloyds

31 May	Kent (H); 249/7 (40 overs)	v	Scotland; 191/7 (40 overs)	Kent won by 58 runs
Scorecard	Kent (H); 249/7 (40 overs)	v	Scotland; 191/7 (40 overs)	St Lawrence Ground, Canterbury; Umpires: MJD Bodenham and JF Steele
Scorecard	AJ Blake 81* (56); GD Drummond 2/42 (7 overs); RT Lyons 2/42 (8 overs)		GJ Bailey 70 (84); A Khan 3/32 (8 overs)	St Lawrence Ground, Canterbury; Umpires: MJD Bodenham and JF Steele
Scotland won the toss and elected to field; Points: Kent 2, Scotland 0				St Lawrence Ground, Canterbury; Umpires: MJD Bodenham and JF Steele

25 July	Hampshire; 238/7 (40 overs)	v	(H) Kent; 236/4 (40 overs)	Hampshire won by 2 runs
Scorecard	Hampshire; 238/7 (40 overs)	v	(H) Kent; 236/4 (40 overs)	St Lawrence Ground, Canterbury; Umpires: MJD Bodenham and NJ Llong
Scorecard	MJ Lumb 50 (55); JC Tredwell 3/40 (8 overs)		JL Denly 102* (109); DG Cork 3/56 (8 overs)	St Lawrence Ground, Canterbury; Umpires: MJD Bodenham and NJ Llong
Kent won the toss and elected to field; Points: Kent 0, Hampshire 2				St Lawrence Ground, Canterbury; Umpires: MJD Bodenham and NJ Llong

8 August	Leicestershire; 148 (30.1 overs)	v	(H) Kent; 150/2 (26.1 overs)	Kent won by 8 wickets (with 83 balls remaining)
Scorecard	Leicestershire; 148 (30.1 overs)	v	(H) Kent; 150/2 (26.1 overs)	St Lawrence Ground, Canterbury; Umpires: RA Kettleborough and P Willey
Scorecard	JGE Benning 37 (33); HMCM Bandara 5/35 (8 overs)		M van Jaarsveld 56* (54); JGE Benning 1/23 (5 overs)	St Lawrence Ground, Canterbury; Umpires: RA Kettleborough and P Willey
Leicestershire won the toss and elected to bat; Points: Kent 2, Leicestershire 0				St Lawrence Ground, Canterbury; Umpires: RA Kettleborough and P Willey

22 August	Kent (H); 135/3 (16 overs)	v	Nottinghamshire; 93/9 (16 overs)	Kent won by 42 runs
Scorecard	Kent (H); 135/3 (16 overs)	v	Nottinghamshire; 93/9 (16 overs)	St Lawrence Ground, Canterbury; Umpires: RK Illingworth and RT Robinson
Scorecard	DI Stevens 49* (35); SR Patel 1/9 (3 overs)		AD Hales 21 (17); MT Coles 3/7 (2 overs)	St Lawrence Ground, Canterbury; Umpires: RK Illingworth and RT Robinson
Nottinghamshire won the toss and elected to field; Match reduced to 16 overs per side due to rain; Points: Kent 2, Nottinghamshire 0				St Lawrence Ground, Canterbury; Umpires: RK Illingworth and RT Robinson

29 August	Kent; 241/5 (40 overs)	v	(H) Hampshire; 221 (38.5 overs)	Kent won by 20 runs
Scorecard	Kent; 241/5 (40 overs)	v	(H) Hampshire; 221 (38.5 overs)	Rose Bowl, Southampton; Umpires: NL Bainton and JF Steele
Scorecard	M van Jaarsveld 104* (83); DR Briggs 1/35 (8 overs)		JHK Adams 74 (71); MT Coles 4/47 (8 overs)	Rose Bowl, Southampton; Umpires: NL Bainton and JF Steele
Kent won the toss and elected to bat; Points: Hampshire 0, Kent 2				Rose Bowl, Southampton; Umpires: NL Bainton and JF Steele

30 August	Leicestershire (H); 182 (38.1 overs)	v	Kent; 185/4 (33.2 overs)	Kent won by 6 wickets (with 40 balls remaining)
Scorecard	Leicestershire (H); 182 (38.1 overs)	v	Kent; 185/4 (33.2 overs)	Grace Road, Leicester; Umpires: SA Garratt and MA Gough
Scorecard	T New 47* (64); MT Coles 3/27 (6 overs)		RWT Key 45 (42); JGE Benning 2/32 (7 overs)	Grace Road, Leicester; Umpires: SA Garratt and MA Gough
Kent won the toss and elected to field; Points: Leicestershire 0, Kent 2				Grace Road, Leicester; Umpires: SA Garratt and MA Gough

4 September	Kent; 144 (39.1 overs)	v	(H) Durham; 113 (33.3 overs)	Kent won by 31 runs
Scorecard	Kent; 144 (39.1 overs)	v	(H) Durham; 113 (33.3 overs)	Riverside Ground, Chester-le-Street; Umpires: TE Jesty and NA Mallender
Scorecard	JL Denly 71 (121); N Killeen 3/24 (8 overs)		BW Harmison 34 (57); JC Tredwell 4/20 (8 overs)	Riverside Ground, Chester-le-Street; Umpires: TE Jesty and NA Mallender
Kent won the toss and elected to bat; Points: Durham 0, Kent 2 AJ Ball and PB Muchall made their List A debuts (this was Muchall's only appearance for Kent)				Riverside Ground, Chester-le-Street; Umpires: TE Jesty and NA Mallender

== Friends Life t20 ==
=== South Division ===
Team	Pld	W	L	T	N/R	Pts	Net R/R
Somerset	16	11	5	0	0	22	+0.418
Essex Eagles	16	10	6	0	0	20	+0.395
Sussex Sharks	16	9	7	0	0	18	+0.606
Hampshire Royals	16	8	8	0	0	16	+0.385
Surrey Lions	16	8	8	0	0	16	+0.183
Middlesex Crusaders	16	8	8	0	0	16	+0.018
Kent Spitfires	16	7	9	0	0	14	−0.163
Glamorgan Dragons	16	6	10	0	0	12	−0.979
Gloucestershire Gladiators	16	5	11	0	0	10	−0.943

=== Matches ===
2 June	Essex (H); 167/9 (20 overs)	v	Kent; 170/4 (18.4 overs)	Kent won by 6 wickets (with 8 balls remaining)
Scorecard	Essex (H); 167/9 (20 overs)	v	Kent; 170/4 (18.4 overs)	County Ground, Chelmsford; Umpires: RK Illingworth and G Sharp; Player of the match: RN ten Doescahte (Essex)
Scorecard	RN ten Doescahte 98 (47); SJ Cook 2/15 (4 overs)		GO Jones 54 (34); GR Napier 2/40 (3.4 overs)	County Ground, Chelmsford; Umpires: RK Illingworth and G Sharp; Player of the match: RN ten Doescahte (Essex)
Kent won the toss and elected to field; Points: Essex 0, Kent 2 AJ Blake made his Twenty20 debut HMCM Bandara made his first appearance for Kent				County Ground, Chelmsford; Umpires: RK Illingworth and G Sharp; Player of the match: RN ten Doescahte (Essex)

3 June	Kent; 114/9 (20 overs)	v	(H) Hampshire; 117/5 (19.4 overs)	Hampshire won by 5 wickets (with 2 balls remaining)
Scorecard	Kent; 114/9 (20 overs)	v	(H) Hampshire; 117/5 (19.4 overs)	Rose Bowl, Southampton; Umpires: MA Gough and TE Jesty; Player of the match: CP Wood (Hampshire)
Scorecard	DI Stevens 36 (34); Abdul Razzaq 2/16 (3 overs)		SM Ervine 31 (23); DI Stevens 2/20 (4 overs); JC Tredwell 2/20 (4 overs)	Rose Bowl, Southampton; Umpires: MA Gough and TE Jesty; Player of the match: CP Wood (Hampshire)
Kent won the toss and elected to bat; Points: Hampshire 2, Kent 0 MT Coles made his Twenty20 debut				Rose Bowl, Southampton; Umpires: MA Gough and TE Jesty; Player of the match: CP Wood (Hampshire)

9 June	Kent (H); 163/5 (20 overs)	v	Sussex; 166/6 (19.4 overs)	Sussex won by 4 wickets (with 2 balls remaining)
Scorecard	Kent (H); 163/5 (20 overs)	v	Sussex; 166/6 (19.4 overs)	Nevill Ground, Tunbridge Wells; Umpires: JH Evans and PJ Hartley; Player of the match: DI Stevens (Kent)
Scorecard	DI Stevens 52* (30); Yasir Arafat 2/32 (4 overs)		MJ Prior 47 (34); JC Tredwell 2/32 (4 overs)	Nevill Ground, Tunbridge Wells; Umpires: JH Evans and PJ Hartley; Player of the match: DI Stevens (Kent)
Sussex won the toss and elected to field; Points: Kent 0, Sussex 2				Nevill Ground, Tunbridge Wells; Umpires: JH Evans and PJ Hartley; Player of the match: DI Stevens (Kent)

11 June	Kent (H); 183/6 (20 overs)	v	Middlesex; 185/4 (19 overs)	Middlesex won by 6 wickets (with 6 balls remaining)
Scorecard	Kent (H); 183/6 (20 overs)	v	Middlesex; 185/4 (19 overs)	St Lawrence Ground, Canterbury; Umpires: SA Garratt and DJ Millns; Player of the match: AC Gilchrist (Middlesex)
Scorecard	M van Jaarsveld 50 (32); PT Collins 3/38 (4 overs)		AC Gilchrist 106 (52); Azhar Mahmood 2/27 (4 overs)	St Lawrence Ground, Canterbury; Umpires: SA Garratt and DJ Millns; Player of the match: AC Gilchrist (Middlesex)
Middlesex won the toss and elected to field; Points: Kent 0, Middlesex 2				St Lawrence Ground, Canterbury; Umpires: SA Garratt and DJ Millns; Player of the match: AC Gilchrist (Middlesex)

13 June	Kent; 217 (19.5 overs)	v	(H) Gloucestershire; 181 (19.5 overs)	Kent won by 36 runs
Scorecard	Kent; 217 (19.5 overs)	v	(H) Gloucestershire; 181 (19.5 overs)	Archdeacon Meadow, Gloucester; Umpires: NGB Cook and VA Holder; Player of the match: SJ Cook (Kent)
Scorecard	JL Denly 48 (31); Kadeer Ali 2/28 (2 overs)		CG Taylor 67 (36); SJ Cook 3/22 (4 overs)	Archdeacon Meadow, Gloucester; Umpires: NGB Cook and VA Holder; Player of the match: SJ Cook (Kent)
Gloucestershire won the toss and elected to field; Points: Gloucestershire 0, Kent 2				Archdeacon Meadow, Gloucester; Umpires: NGB Cook and VA Holder; Player of the match: SJ Cook (Kent)

18 June	Surrey (H); 150/7 (20 overs)	v	Kent; 81/5 (12.5 overs)	Surrey won by 15 runs (D/L method)
Scorecard	Surrey (H); 150/7 (20 overs)	v	Kent; 81/5 (12.5 overs)	The Oval, Kennington, London; Umpires: IJ Gould and G Sharp; Player of the match: A Symonds (Surrey)
Scorecard	A Symonds 62 (32); DI Stevens 3/17 (4 overs)		DI Stevens 33* (20 overs); A Nel 1/12 (2 overs)	The Oval, Kennington, London; Umpires: IJ Gould and G Sharp; Player of the match: A Symonds (Surrey)
Kent won the toss and elected to field; Rain stopped play after 12.5 overs of Kent's innings (D/L target was 97 runs to win); Points: Surrey 2, Kent 0 SA Northeast made his Twenty20 debut				The Oval, Kennington, London; Umpires: IJ Gould and G Sharp; Player of the match: A Symonds (Surrey)

20 June	Somerset; 189/4 (20 overs)	v	(H) Kent; 105 (18.3 overs)	Somerset won by 84 runs
Scorecard	Somerset; 189/4 (20 overs)	v	(H) Kent; 105 (18.3 overs)	County Cricket Ground, Beckenham, Beckenham; Umpires: SA Garratt and MA Gough; Player of the match: JC Hildreth (Somerset)
Scorecard	JC Hildreth 77* (56); SJ Cook 1/28 (4 overs)		GO Jones 25 (26); KA Pollard 4/15 (3.3 overs)	County Cricket Ground, Beckenham, Beckenham; Umpires: SA Garratt and MA Gough; Player of the match: JC Hildreth (Somerset)
Kent won the toss and elected to field; Points: Somerset 2, Kent 0				County Cricket Ground, Beckenham, Beckenham; Umpires: SA Garratt and MA Gough; Player of the match: JC Hildreth (Somerset)

23 June	Surrey; 201/4 (20 overs)	v	(H) Kent; 163/8 (20 overs)	Surrey won by 38 runs
Scorecard	Surrey; 201/4 (20 overs)	v	(H) Kent; 163/8 (20 overs)	County Cricket Ground, Beckenham, Beckenham; Umpires: B Dudlestone and JW Lloyds; Player of the match: JJ Roy (Surrey)
Scorecard	JJ Roy 101* (57); HMCM Bandara 1/26 (3 overs)		M van Jaarsveld 82 (49); A Symonds 5/18 (3 overs)	County Cricket Ground, Beckenham, Beckenham; Umpires: B Dudlestone and JW Lloyds; Player of the match: JJ Roy (Surrey)
Surrey won the toss and elected to bat; Points: Surrey 2, Kent 0				County Cricket Ground, Beckenham, Beckenham; Umpires: B Dudlestone and JW Lloyds; Player of the match: JJ Roy (Surrey)

24 June	Middlesex (H); 154/6 (20 overs)	v	Kent; 141/7 (20 overs)	Middlesex won by 13 runs
Scorecard	Middlesex (H); 154/6 (20 overs)	v	Kent; 141/7 (20 overs)	Lord's, St John's Wood, London; Umpires: MJD Bodenham and NGC Cowley; Player of the match: TMJ Smith (Middlesex)
Scorecard	DJ Malan 41 (25); HMCM Bandara 2/23 (4 overs)		RWT Key 42 (49); TMJ Smith 5/24 (4 overs)	Lord's, St John's Wood, London; Umpires: MJD Bodenham and NGC Cowley; Player of the match: TMJ Smith (Middlesex)
Middlesex won the toss and elected to bat; Points: Middlesex 2, Kent 0 SA Shaw made his Twenty20 debut				Lord's, St John's Wood, London; Umpires: MJD Bodenham and NGC Cowley; Player of the match: TMJ Smith (Middlesex)

27 June	Kent; 194/1 (20 overs)	v	(H) Middlesex; 167/9 (20 overs)	Kent won by 27 runs
Scorecard	Kent; 194/1 (20 overs)	v	(H) Middlesex; 167/9 (20 overs)	County Ground, Hove; Umpires: MA Gough and JF Steele; Player of the match: RWT Key (Kent)
Scorecard	RWT Key 98* (55)		MJ Prior 44 (26); MT Coles 3/30 (4 overs)	County Ground, Hove; Umpires: MA Gough and JF Steele; Player of the match: RWT Key (Kent)
Kent won the toss and elected to bat; Points: Sussex 0, Kent 2				County Ground, Hove; Umpires: MA Gough and JF Steele; Player of the match: RWT Key (Kent)

2 July	Hampshire; 139 (19.5 overs)	v	(H) Kent; 94 (16.3 overs)	Hampshire won by 45 runs
Scorecard	Hampshire; 139 (19.5 overs)	v	(H) Kent; 94 (16.3 overs)	St Lawrence Ground, Canterbury; Umpires: NGB Cook and IJ Gould; Player of the match: SP Jones (Hampshire)
Scorecard	SM Ervine 31 (23); HMCM Bandara 3/14 (4 overs)		RWT Key 22 (17); DR Briggs 3/5 (4 overs)	St Lawrence Ground, Canterbury; Umpires: NGB Cook and IJ Gould; Player of the match: SP Jones (Hampshire)
Hampshire won the toss and elected to bat; Points: Kent 0, Hampshire 2				St Lawrence Ground, Canterbury; Umpires: NGB Cook and IJ Gould; Player of the match: SP Jones (Hampshire)

4 July	Kent (H); 165/9 (20 overs)	v	Gloucestershire; 153 (19.2 overs)	Kent won by 12 runs
Scorecard	Kent (H); 165/9 (20 overs)	v	Gloucestershire; 153 (19.2 overs)	St Lawrence Ground, Canterbury; Umpires: TE Jesty and P Willey; Player of the match: M van Jaarsveld (Kent)
Scorecard	M van Jaarsveld 59 (40); DA Payne 3/25 (4 overs)		JEC Franklin 40 (33); HMCM Bandara 3/27 (4 overs)	St Lawrence Ground, Canterbury; Umpires: TE Jesty and P Willey; Player of the match: M van Jaarsveld (Kent)
Kent won the toss and elected to bat; Points: Kent 2, Gloucestershire 0				St Lawrence Ground, Canterbury; Umpires: TE Jesty and P Willey; Player of the match: M van Jaarsveld (Kent)

9 July	Kent (H); 171/6 (20 overs)	v	Essex; 174/6 (19.4 overs)	Essex won by 4 wickets (with 2 balls remaining)
Scorecard	Kent (H); 171/6 (20 overs)	v	Essex; 174/6 (19.4 overs)	The Oval, Kennington, London; Umpires: NGC Cowley and RT Robinson; Player of the match: AN Cook (Essex)
Scorecard	DI Stevens 50* (26); SB Styris 2/35 (4 overs)		AN Cook 51 (36); SJ Cook 2/21 (4 overs)	The Oval, Kennington, London; Umpires: NGC Cowley and RT Robinson; Player of the match: AN Cook (Essex)
Kent won the toss and elected to field; Points: Kent 0, Essex 2 Kent staged this home match outside of the county at The Oval				The Oval, Kennington, London; Umpires: NGC Cowley and RT Robinson; Player of the match: AN Cook (Essex)

11 July	Glamorgan; 126/6 (20 overs)	v	(H) Kent; 130/4 (19.1 overs)	Kent won by 6 wickets (with 5 balls remaining)
Scorecard	Glamorgan; 126/6 (20 overs)	v	(H) Kent; 130/4 (19.1 overs)	St Lawrence Ground, Canterbury; Umpires: RJ Bailey and RT Robinson; Player of the match: Azhar Mahmood (Kent)
Scorecard	MJ Cosgrove 36 (33); HMCM Bandara 3/15 (4 overs)		JL Denly 36 (38); RDB Croft 3/19 (4 overs)	St Lawrence Ground, Canterbury; Umpires: RJ Bailey and RT Robinson; Player of the match: Azhar Mahmood (Kent)
Glamorgan won the toss and elected to bat; Points: Kent 2, Glamorgan 0				St Lawrence Ground, Canterbury; Umpires: RJ Bailey and RT Robinson; Player of the match: Azhar Mahmood (Kent)

16 July	Kent; 158/9 (20 overs)	v	(H) Glamorgan; 95/3 (14.4 overs)	Kent won by 14 runs (D/L method)
Scorecard	Kent; 158/9 (20 overs)	v	(H) Glamorgan; 95/3 (14.4 overs)	Sophia Gardens, Cardiff; Umpires: NGC Cowley and NA Mallender; Player of the match: MJ Cosgrove (Glamorgan)
Scorecard	JL Denly 30 (19); DA Cosker 2/23 (4 overs)		MJ Cosgrove 54 (44); MT Coles 1/8 (1.4 overs)	Sophia Gardens, Cardiff; Umpires: NGC Cowley and NA Mallender; Player of the match: MJ Cosgrove (Glamorgan)
Glamorgan won the toss and elected to field; Rain stopped play after 14.4 overs of Glamorgan's innings (D/L target was 110 runs to win); Points: Glamorgan 0, Kent 2				Sophia Gardens, Cardiff; Umpires: NGC Cowley and NA Mallender; Player of the match: MJ Cosgrove (Glamorgan)

18 July	Kent; 141 (19.5 overs)	v	(H) Somerset; 82 (16.5 overs)	Kent won by 59 runs
Scorecard	Kent; 141 (19.5 overs)	v	(H) Somerset; 82 (16.5 overs)	County Ground, Taunton; Umpires: PJ Hartley and P Willey; Player of the match: DI Stevens (Kent)
Scorecard	JL Denly 65 (56); AC Thomas 3/21 (3.5 overs)		AV Suppiah 19* (20); SJ Cook 3/14 (4 overs); JC Tredwell 3/14 (3 overs)	County Ground, Taunton; Umpires: PJ Hartley and P Willey; Player of the match: DI Stevens (Kent)
Kent won the toss and elected to bat; Points: Somerset 0, Kent 2				County Ground, Taunton; Umpires: PJ Hartley and P Willey; Player of the match: DI Stevens (Kent)
