= Kent County Cricket Club in 2009 =

Kent County Cricket Club
2009 season
- Coach: (South Africa) Graham Ford
- Captain: (England) Rob Key
- Overseas player: (South Africa) Wayne Parnell
- Ground(s): St Lawrence Ground, Canterbury; Nevill Ground, Tunbridge Wells; County Ground, Beckenham
- County Championship: Division Two, 1st (promoted)
- NatWest Pro40: Division Two, 3rd
- Friends Provident Trophy: Group stage
- Twenty20 Cup: Semi-final
- Most runs: FC: M van Jaarsveld (1,509); LA: JL Denly (429); T20: Darren Stevens (356)
- Most wickets: FC: JC Tredwell (69); LA: Azhar Mahmood (15); T20: Azhar Mahmood (16)
- Most catches: FC: M van Jaarsveld (36); JM Kemp (36); LA: AJ Blake (6); JM Kemp (6); T20: JM Kemp (7)
- Most wicket-keeping dismissals: FC: GO Jones (44); LA: GO Jones (10); T20: GO Jones (13)

The 2009 season saw Kent County Cricket Club compete in four competitions: the Second Division of the County Championship, the Friends Provident Trophy, the second division of the Pro40 League and the Twenty20 Cup. It was the county's first ever season in the second tier of the County Championship, following their relegation at the end of the 2008 season.

Promotion back to the First Division of the County Championship was achieved on 18 September following a draw against Leicestershire.

== Squad ==
Kent originally announced that their overseas player for 2009 would be Australian fast bowler Stuart Clark. However Clark received a late call-up to join the Australian tour of South Africa forcing the county side to look at other options. Kent announced Clark's replacement would be South African 19-year old left-arm fast bowler Wayne Parnell. Three other South African players remained at the county as Kolpak players: all-rounders Justin Kemp, Ryan McLaren and vice-captain Martin van Jaarsveld. In addition, former Pakistan international all-rounder Azhar Mahmood was with Kent for a second season, having been granted British citizenship.

Batsman James Hockley, who was released at the end of the 2002 season and had been playing club cricket and teaching since, was re-signed by Kent for a second spell. Left-arm spinner Rob Ferley also returned for a second spell with the county.

With Parnell yet to arrive, McLaren on IPL duty, and several other bowlers suffering with early season injuries, Kent signed 35-year old seamer Steffan Jones on a one-month loan from Somerset at the start of the season.

=== Squad list ===
- Ages given as of the first day of the County Championship season, 15 April 2009.

Name	Nationality	Birth date	Batting style	Bowling style	Notes
Batsmen
Alex Blake	England	25 January 1989 (aged 20)	Left-handed	Right arm medium-fast	
Joe Denly	England	16 March 1986 (aged 23)	Right-handed	Right arm leg break	
James Goodman	England	19 November 1990 (aged 18)	Right-handed	Right arm medium	
James Hockley	England	16 April 1979 (aged 29)	Right-handed	Right arm off break	
Rob Key	England	12 May 1979 (aged 29)	Right-handed	Right arm off break	Club captain
Sam Northeast	England	16 October 1989 (aged 19)	Right-handed	Right arm off break	
Chris Piesley	England	12 February 1992 (aged 17)	Left-handed	Right arm off break	
Martin van Jaarsveld	South Africa	18 June 1974 (aged 34)	Right-handed	Right arm medium / Right arm off break	Kolpak player, vice-captain
All-rounders
Azhar Mahmood	Pakistan	28 February 1975 (aged 34)	Right-handed	Right arm fast-medium	British citizen
Matt Coles	England	26 May 1990 (aged 18)	Left-handed	Right arm fast-medium	
Charlie Hemphrey	England	31 August 1989 (aged 19)	Right-handed	Right arm off break	
Justin Kemp	South Africa	2 October 1977 (aged 31)	Right-handed	Right arm fast-medium	Kolpak player
Ryan McLaren	South Africa	9 February 1983 (aged 26)	Left-handed	Right arm medium-fast	Kolpak player
Darren Stevens	England	30 April 1976 (aged 32)	Right-handed	Right arm medium	
Wicket-keepers
Paul Dixey	England	2 November 1987 (aged 21)	Right-handed	—	
Geraint Jones	England	14 July 1979 (aged 29)	Right-handed	—	
Bowlers
Simon Cook	England	15 January 1977 (aged 32)	Right-handed	Right arm medium-fast	
Phil Edwards	England	16 April 1984 (aged 24)	Right-handed	Right arm fast-medium	
Rob Ferley	England	4 February 1982 (aged 27)	Right-handed	Slow left arm orthodox	
James Iles	England	11 February 1990 (aged 19)	Right-handed	Right arm medium-fast	
Steffan Jones	Wales	9 February 1974 (aged 35)	Right-handed	Right arm fast-medium	On loan from Somerset
Robbie Joseph	England	20 January 1982 (aged 27)	Right-handed	Right arm fast	
Amjad Khan	England	14 October 1980 (aged 28)	Right-handed	Right arm fast-medium	
Warren Lee	England	27 August 1987 (aged 21)	Right-handed	Right arm medium-fast	
Wayne Parnell	South Africa	30 July 1989 (aged 19)	Left-handed	Left arm medium-fast	Overseas player
Martin Saggers	England	23 May 1972 (aged 36)	Right-handed	Right arm fast-medium	
James Tredwell	England	27 February 1982 (aged 27)	Left-handed	Right arm off break	

== Summary ==
=== First-class matches ===
In all, the county played seventeen first-class matches, consisting of sixteen County Championship games and a three-day friendly against Loughborough University Centre of Cricketing Excellence.

No.	Date	Opponents	Venue	Result	Notes	Ref
1	15–17 April	Loughborough UCCE	St Lawrence Ground, Canterbury	Drawn	Not a County Championship match	
2	21–24 April	Northamptonshire	St Lawrence Ground, Canterbury	Drawn		
3	29 April – 2 May	Essex	County Ground, Chelmsford	Won by 192 runs	Won after following-on	
4	6–9 May	Glamorgan	St Lawrence Ground, Canterbury	Won by 204 runs		
5	6–9 June	Leicestershire	Grace Road, Leicester	Drawn		
6	16–19 June	Essex	Nevill Ground, Royal Tunbridge Wells	Lost by 122 runs		
7	30 June – 3 July	Gloucestershire	County Ground, Beckenham	Won by 76 runs		
8	10–13 July	Surrey	The Oval, London	Drawn		
9	15–18 July	Glamorgan	SWALEC Stadium, Cardiff	Won by an innings and 45 runs		
10	31 July – 3 August	Derbyshire	St Lawrence Ground, Canterbury	Won by 3 wickets		
11	5–7 August	Middlesex	St Lawrence Ground, Canterbury	Lost by 47 runs		
12	11–14 August	Northamptonshire	County Ground, Northampton	Won by 238 runs		
13	28–31 August	Surrey	St Lawrence Ground, Canterbury	Won by 6 wickets		
14	2–5 September	Derbyshire	County Ground, Derby	Drawn		
15	9–12 September	Middlesex	Uxbridge Cricket Club, Uxbridge	Won by 10 wickets		
16	15–18 September	Leicestershire	St Lawrence Ground, Canterbury	Drawn		
17	23–25 September	Gloucestershire	County Ground, Bristol	Lost by an innings and 23 runs		

=== One day matches ===
Comp.	Date	Opponents	Venue	Results	Notes	Ref
FPT	26 April	Somerset	County Ground, Taunton	Lost by 110 runs		
FPT	3 May	Middlesex	John Walker's Ground, Southgate	Won by 6 wickets		
FPT	4 May	Scotland	St Lawrence Ground, Canterbury	Won by 4 wickets	Duckworth–Lewis method used.	
FPT	10 May	Warwickshire	St Lawrence Ground, Canterbury	Won by 4 wickets		
FPT	11 May	Middlesex	St Lawrence Ground, Canterbury	Lost by 80 runs		
FPT	16 May	Somerset	St Lawrence Ground, Canterbury	Lost by 45 runs		
FPT	18 May	Scotland	The Grange, Edinburgh	Lost by 9 wickets	Duckworth–Lewis method used.	
FPT	20 May	Warwickshire	Edgbaston, Birmingham	Tied	Duckworth–Lewis method used.	
Pro40	21 July	Glamorgan	SWALEC Stadium, Cardiff	Abandoned	Floodlit	
Pro40	9 August	Middlesex	St Lawrence Ground, Canterbury	Won by 12 runs		
Pro40	18 August	Leicestershire	Grace Road, Leicester	Won by 3 wickets	Floodlit	
Pro40	23 August	Derbyshire	Queen's Park, Chesterfield	Won by 4 wickets		
Pro40	27 August	Surrey	St Lawrence Ground, Canterbury	Won by 8 runs	Floodlit; Duckworth–Lewis method used.	
Pro40	6 September	Lancashire	Old Trafford, Manchester	Lost by 25 runs	Duckworth–Lewis method used.	
Pro40	13 September	Warwickshire	St Lawrence Ground, Canterbury	Lost by 59 runs		
Pro40	27 September	Northamptonshire	St Lawrence Ground, Canterbury	Lost by 99 runs		

=== Twenty20 Cup ===
Kent finished top of the South Division table, qualifying for the quarter-finals for the fourth consecutive season. Victory against Durham saw them qualify for Finals Day at Edgbaston, where they were comprehensively beaten by Somerset in the second semi final.

Stage	Date	Opponents	Venue	Results	Notes	Ref
South	25 May	Essex	St Lawrence Ground, Canterbury	No result		
South	27 May	Middlesex	Lord's Cricket Ground, London	Won by 62 runs	Floodlit	
South	29 May	Middlesex	St Lawrence Ground, Canterbury	Won by 4 wickets		
South	31 May	Sussex	St Lawrence Ground, Canterbury	Won by 5 wickets		
South	1 June	Essex	County Ground, Chelmsford	Lost by 36 runs	Floodlit	
South	2 June	Sussex	County Ground, Hove	Lost by 2 runs	Floodlit; Duckworth–Lewis method	
South	22 June	Hampshire	Nevill Ground, Royal Tunbridge Wells	Won by 8 runs		
South	24 June	Surrey	The Oval, London	Won by 1 run		
South	26 June	Hampshire	The Rose Bowl, Southampton	Won by 7 wickets	Floodlit	
South	28 June	Surrey	County Ground, Beckenham	Won by 16 runs		
Quarter-final	27 July	Durham	St Lawrence Ground, Canterbury	Won by 56 runs		
Semi-final	15 August	Somerset	Edgbaston, Birmingham	Lost by 7 wickets		

== Matches ==
=== First-class matches ===
15–17 April 2009

Kent	v	Loughborough UCCE
499/5 (114 overs); Darren Stevens 193*; Peter Groves 2/69 (13)

Match drawn
St Lawrence Ground, Canterbury
Umpires: Steve O'Shaughnessy and John Steele

- No play on days 2 or 3 due to rain.
- MT Coles made his first class debut

21–24 April 2009

Northamptonshire	v	Kent
355 (128.2 overs); Nicky Boje 98; Azhar Mahmood 4/73 (23)		417 (107.4 overs); Martin van Jaarsveld 107; Andrew Hall 3/89 (20)
348/7d (135 overs); Stephen Peters 107; James Tredwell 3/67 (37)

Match drawn
St Lawrence Ground, Canterbury
Umpires: Nigel Cowley and Barry Dudleston

- Points: Kent 11, Northamptonshire 10

29 April – 2 May 2009

Essex	v	Kent
370 (104.5 overs); James Foster 99; Wayne Parnell 4/78 (27.5)		205 (62 overs); Wayne Parnell 69; David Masters 2/18 (14)
155 (57.2 overs); Ryan ten Doeschate 36; Robbie Joseph 6/55 (13.2)		512/9d (f/o, 149.4 overs); Darren Stevens 136*; Danish Kaneria 4/172 (46)

Kent won by 192 runs
County Ground, Chelmsford
Umpires: Neil Bainton and Martin Bodenham

- Points: Kent 18, Essex 7

6–9 May 2009

Kent	v	Glamorgan
282 (79.3 overs); Wayne Parnell 90; Adam Shantry 3/54 (20)		307 (95.4 overs); Jamie Dalrymple 79; James Tredwell 3/54 (24)
409/5d (91 overs); Martin van Jaarsveld 182; Adam Shantry 2/68 (21)		180 (69 overs); Ben Wright 81; James Tredwell 8/66 (28)

Kent won by 204 runs
St Lawrence Ground, Canterbury
Umpires: Jeremy Lloyds and Peter Willey

- Points: Kent 19, Glamorgan 6

6–9 June 2009

Leicestershire	v	Kent
403/9d (110.3 overs); Boeta Dippenaar 89; Simon Cook 5/78 (26)		265/2 (63.5 overs); Joe Denly 116*; Harry Gurney 1/55 (17.5)

Match drawn
Grace Road, Leicester
Umpires: Nigel Cowley and Richard Kettleborough

- No play on days 1 and 2 due to rain.
- Points: Kent 9, Leicestershire 9

16–19 June 2009

Essex	v	Kent
280 (90.5 overs); Graham Napier 64*; Ryan McLaren 4/80 (17.2)		123 (50.3 overs); Justin Kemp 36; Graham Napier 4/32 (15)
320/6d (99.4 overs); Mark Pettini 101*; Ryan McLaren 3/72 (20)		355 (120.2 overs); Joe Denly 123; Danish Kaneria 6/92 (42)

Essex won by 122 runs
Nevill Ground, Royal Tunbridge Wells
Umpires: Nick Cook and John Steele

- Points: Kent 3, Essex 19

30 June – 3 July 2009

Kent	v	Gloucestershire
231 (74.2 overs); Martin van Jaarsveld 53; Vikram Banerjee 3/58 (19.2)		166 (56.1 overs); Craig Spearman 47; Simon Cook 5/22 (11.1)
266 (96 overs); Martin van Jaarsveld 62; Steven Kirby 5/44 (26)		255 (82.3 overs); Jon Lewis 61* (49); Azhar Mahmood 5/39 (16.3)

Kent won by 76 runs
County Ground, Beckenham
Umpires: Martin Bodenham and John Holder

- Points: Kent 18, Gloucestershire 3

10–13 July 2009

Surrey	v	Kent
386 (115 overs); Mark Ramprakash 86; Amjad Khan 3/56 (18)		620/7d (154.2 overs); Justin Kemp 183; Pedro Collins 2/107 (32)
170/3 (62 overs); Mark Butcher 60*; James Tredwell 2/42 (23)

Match drawn
The Oval, London
Umpires: Rob Bailey and John Steele

- Points: Kent 12, Surrey 9

15–18 July 2009

Glamorgan	v	Kent
317 (99.3 overs); Gareth Rees 80; Ryan McLaren 4/51 (18.3)		557/5d (123.4 overs); Rob Key 270*; James Harris 3/118 (29.4)
195 (61.5 overs); Mike Powell 60; James Tredwell 4/48 (20.5)

Kent won by an innings and 45 runs
SWALEC Stadium, Cardiff
Umpires: Vanburn Holder and Tim Robinson

- Points: Kent 22, Glamorgan 4

31 July – 3 August 2009

Derbyshire	v	Kent
303 (83.5 overs); Wavell Hinds 74; James Tredwell 4/92 (22)		289 (93 overs); James Tredwell 86; Graham Wagg 5/96 (36)
303 (95 overs); Chris Rogers 107; James Tredwell 4/93 (32)		318/7 (70.5 overs); Rob Key 110; Tim Groenewald 3/52 (12.5)

Kent won by 3 wickets
St Lawrence Ground, Canterbury
Umpires: Steve Garratt and Richard Illingworth

- Points: Kent 19, Derbyshire 6

5–7 August 2009

Middlesex	v	Kent
155 (36 overs); Gareth Berg 57*; Amjad Khan 3/41 (12)		141 (37 overs); Darren Stevens 67; Tim Murtagh 3/26 (11)
320 (93 overs); Gareth Berg 98; James Tredwell 5/100 (33)		287 (91.4 overs); Amjad Khan 62*; Murali Kartik 4/53 (35)

Middlesex won by 47 runs
St Lawrence Ground, Canterbury
Umpires: Barry Dudleston and Michael Gough

- Points: Kent 3, Middlesex 17

11–14 August 2009

Kent	v	Northamptonshire
244 (80.4 overs); Rob Key 90; Johan van der Wath 3/32 (12.4)		218 (73.4 overs); Riki Wessels 74; James Tredwell 5/68 (24.4)
302/5d (88.4 overs); Martin van Jaarsveld 100*; Nicky Boje 4/59 (20)		90 (46.1 overs); Niall O'Brien 41; James Tredwell 5/32 (20)

Kent won by 238 runs
County Ground, Northampton
Umpires: David Millns and Tim Robinson

- Points: Kent 18, Northamptonshire 4

28–31 August 2009

Surrey	v	Kent
423 (129.3 overs); Jon Batty 96; Amjad Khan 5/113 (31.3)		517 (110.3 overs); Geraint Jones 156; Chris Schofield 3/90 (19)
293 (101.5 overs); Stuart Meaker 64*; Amjad Khan 3/49 (17.5)		200/4 (35 overs); Rob Key 50; Stuart Meaker 2/29 (4)

Kent won by 6 wickets
St Lawrence Ground, Canterbury
Umpires: George Sharp and Peter Willey

- Points: Kent 22, Surrey 7

2–5 September 2009

Kent	v	Derbyshire
281 (83.5 overs); Geraint Jones 108; Steffan Jones 5/35 (20.5)		583/4d (132 overs); Chris Rogers 208; Amjad Khan 4/110 (26)
333/2 (88 overs); Rob Key 141*; Greg Smith 1/55 (20)

Match drawn
County Ground, Derby
Umpires: Vanburn Holder and Trevor Jesty

- Points: Kent 7, Derbyshire 12

9–12 September 2009

Kent	v	Middlesex
652/7d (153 overs); Darren Stevens 208; Tim Murtagh 2/114 (24)		356 (110 overs); Neil Dexter 146; Azhar Mahmood 3/60 (22)
36/0 (5.1 overs); Sam Northeast 19		326 (f/o, 116 overs); Neil Dexter 118; Rob Ferley 3/73 (33)

Kent won by 10 wickets
Uxbridge Cricket Club, Uxbridge
Umpires: John Holder and Trevor Jesty

- Points: Kent 22, Middlesex 5

15–18 September 2009

Leicestershire	v	Kent
148 (57 overs); Boeta Dippenaar 54; Simon Cook 5/44 (18)		453 (100.4 overs); Martin van Jaarsveld 146; A. J. Harris 4/84 (19.4)
350/2d (122 overs); Paul Nixon 173*; Martin van Jaarsveld 1/33 (9)

Match drawn
St Lawrence Ground, Canterbury
Umpires: Jeff Evans and Peter Hartley

- Points: Kent 12, Leicestershire 7

23–25 September 2009

Kent	v	Gloucestershire
264 (62 overs); Simon Cook 60*; James Franklin 5/30 (13)		552 (123.4 overs); Stephen Adshead 114; James Tredwell 3/100 (28)
265 (56.3 overs); Sam Northeast 128*; Jon Lewis 2/45 (12.3)

Gloucestershire won by an innings and 23 runs
County Ground, Bristol
Umpires: Michael Gough and Richard Illingworth

- Points: Kent 4, Gloucestershire 22

|}

=== Friends Provident Trophy matches ===
26 April 2009

Somerset; 291/3 (38 overs)	v	Kent; 181 (33.1 overs)
Peter Trego 73 (36); Rob Ferley 2/46 (8)		Geraint Jones 43* (35); Alfonso Thomas 3/38 (7)

Somerset won by 110 runs
County Ground, Taunton
Umpires: Neil Bainton and John Holder
Player of the match: Peter Trego (Somerset)

- Match reduced to 38 overs per side.

3 May 2009

Middlesex; 133 (36.4 overs)	v	Kent; 137/4 (37.2 overs)
Ben Scott 29* (50); James Tredwell 6/27 (10)		Darren Stevens 37* (62); Dawid Malan 2/37 (6)

Kent won by 6 wickets
John Walker's Ground, Southgate
Umpires: Peter Hartley and Richard Kettleborough
Player of the match: James Tredwell (Kent)

4 May 2009

Scotland; 227/7 (50 overs)	v	Kent; 206/6 (42.2 overs)
Gavin Hamilton 75 (112); Robbie Joseph 3/55 (10)		Joe Denly 97* (129); Ryan Watson 2/29 (6.2)

Kent won by 4 wickets (Duckworth–Lewis method)
St Lawrence Ground, Canterbury
Umpires: Keith Coburn and Richard Illingworth
Player of the match: Joe Denly (Kent)

- Rain stopped play after 20.2 overs of Kent's reply; the Kent target was reduced to 206 from 44 overs.

10 May 2009

Warwickshire; 218 (49.2 overs)	v	Kent; 219/6 (41.5 overs)
Jim Troughton 62 (59); Wayne Parnell 3/27 (9)		Joe Denly 49 (62); Ant Botha 2/47 (7.5)

Kent won by 4 wickets
St Lawrence Ground, Canterbury
Umpires: Jeremy Lloyds and Peter Willey
Player of the match: Wayne Parnell (Kent)

11 May 2009

Middlesex; 322/5 (50 overs)	v	Kent; 242 (45.4 overs)
Eoin Morgan 161 (136); Azhar Mahmood 2/51 (10)		Justin Kemp 69 (71); Chris Silverwood 3/26 (8)

Middlesex won by 80 runs
St Lawrence Ground, Canterbury
Umpires: Tim Robinson and John Steele
Player of the match: Eoin Morgan (Middlesex)

16 May 2009

Somerset; 296 (50 overs)	v	Kent; 251/9 (50 overs)
Justin Langer 77 (60); Simon Cook 3/29 (10)		Martin van Jaarsveld 132* (125); Peter Trego 4/56 (10)

Somerset won by 45 runs
St Lawrence Ground, Canterbury
Umpires: Neil Mallender and David Millns
Player of the match: Martin van Jaarsveld (Kent)

18 May 2009

Kent; 65/4 (19.5 overs)	v	Scotland; 80/1 (14.5 overs)
Geraint Jones 18 (33); Sean Weeraratna 2/14 (5)		Fraser Watts 45 (38); Simon Cook 1/29 (4)

Scotland won by 9 wickets (Duckworth–Lewis method)
Umpires: John Holder and Tim Robinson
Player of the match: Fraser Watts (Scotland)

- Rain stopped play 10 overs into Kent's innings, reducing the match to 48 overs a side. Further rain after another 9.5 overs ended the innings; Scotland's target under the Duckworth–Lewis method was 77 from 18 overs.

18 May 2009

Kent; 265 (49.2 overs)	v	Warwickshire; 241/6 (46.5 overs)
Joe Denly 115 (128); Steffan Piolet 3/53 (10)		Jim Troughton 67 (88); Simon Cook 4/37 (10)

Match tied (Duckworth–Lewis method)
Edgbaston, Birmingham
Umpires: Nigel Cowley and Jeff Evans
Player of the match: Joe Denly (Kent)

- Rain ended play after 46.5 overs of Warwickshire's reply; the Duckworth–Lewis target was 242.

=== Pro40 League matches ===
21 July

v

No result (match abandoned without a ball bowled)
Sophia Gardens, Cardiff
Umpires: Michael Gough and Richard Kettleborough

9 August 2009

Kent; 258/4 (40 overs)	v	Middlesex; 246 (38.3 overs)
Darren Stevens 75 (50); Tim Murtagh 2/38 (7 overs)		Owais Shah 130 (94); Warren Lee 3/39 (7.3 overs)

Kent won by 12 runs
St Lawrence Ground, Canterbury
Umpires: Barry Dudleston and Michael Gough

- MT Coles and PD Edwards made their List A debuts

18 August 2009 (floodlit)

Leicestershire; 239/8 (40 overs)	v	Kent; 211/7 (39.4 overs)
James Taylor 95 (113); Azhar Mahmood 4/41 (8 overs)		Sam Northeast 130 (94); Claude Henderson 2/24 (8 overs)

Kent won by 3 wickets
Grace Road, Leicester
Umpires: Steve Garratt and Jeremy Lloyds
Player of the match: James Taylor (Leicestershire)

23 August 2009

Derbyshire; 259/8 (40 overs)	v	Kent; 260/6 (38.2 overs)
Chris Rogers 88 (107); Phil Edwards 3/57 (7 overs)		Alex Blake 80 (70); Dan Redfern 2/10 (1.2 overs)

Kent won by 4 wickets
Queen's Park, Chesterfield
Umpires: Nick Cook and Neil Mallender

27 August 2009 (floodlit)

Kent; 167/6 (27 overs)	v	Surrey; 110/5 (19.4 overs)
Sam Northeast 69 (67); Stuart Meaker 2/21 (4 overs)		Chris Schofield 42* (33); James Tredwell 2/28 (5 overs)

Kent won by 8 runs D/L
St Lawrence Ground, Canterbury
Umpires: George Sharp and Peter Willey
Player of the match: Sam Northeast (Kent)

- Match reduced to 27 overs per side due to rain; Surrey's innings was stopped after 19.4 overs with a D/L victory target of 119

6 September

Kent; 162	v	Lancashire; 80/1 (17.4 overs)
Justin Kemp 44 (50); Steven Mullaney 3/36 (7 overs)		Paul Horton 51 (55); Darren Stevens 1/8 (2 overs)

Lancashire won by 25 runs D/L
Old Trafford, Manchester
Umpires: Neil Mallender and David Millns

- Rain stopped the Lancashire innings after 17.4 overs with a D/L victory target of 56

13 September

Warwickshire; 283/6 (40 overs)	v	Kent; 224 (35.2 overs)
Neil Carter 103* (66); Darren Stevens 2/25 (4 overs)		Geraint Jones 63 (60); Ant Botha 3/72 (8 overs)

Warwickshire won by 59 runs
St Lawrence Ground, Canterbury
Umpires: Michael Gough and Peter Willey

27 September

Lancashire; 244/6 (40 overs)	v	Kent; 145 (31.5 overs)
Niall O'Brien 72 (52); James Hockley 2/32 (8 overs)		James Hockley 55 (72); David Lucas 4/28 (7 overs)

Northamptonshire won by 99 runs
St Lawrence Ground, Canterbury
Umpires: Nigel Llong and David Millns

=== Twenty20 Cup matches ===
25 May 2009

Essex; 187/7 (20 overs)	v	Kent; 16/0 (3.2 overs)
Alastair Cook 80 (56); Azhar Mahmood 2/33 (4)		Joe Denly 9* (10)

No result
St Lawrence Ground, Canterbury
Umpires: Neil Bainton and Trevor Jesty

- Bad light ended the match early, with Kent having not received the required number of overs to constitute a match.

27 May 2009
(floodlit)

Kent; 191/3 (20 overs)	v	Middlesex; 129/8 (20 overs)
Martin van Jaarsveld 75* (53); Alan Richardson 2/25 (4)		Shaun Udal 26* (18); James Tredwell 2/14 (4)

Kent won by 62 runs
Lord's Cricket Ground, London
Umpires: Martin Bodenham and George Sharp
Player of the match: Darren Stevens (Kent)

29 May 2009

Middlesex; 104/6 (20 overs)	v	Kent; 107/6 (18.2 overs)
Tyron Henderson 31* (38); Robbie Joseph 2/14 (4)		Ryan McLaren 31 (43); Alan Richardson 3/29 (4)

Kent won by 4 wickets
St Lawrence Ground, Canterbury
Umpires: Neil Bainton and Nigel Llong
Player of the match: Robbie Joseph (Kent)

31 May 2009

Sussex; 132/7 (20 overs)	v	Kent; 133/5 (17 overs)
Yasir Arafat 43 (34); Azhar Mahmood 3/16 (4)		Geraint Jones 56 (39); James Kirtley 2/15 (2)

Kent won by 5 wickets
St Lawrence Ground, Canterbury
Umpires: Neil Bainton and Nick Cook
Player of the match: Geraint Jones (Kent)

1 June 2009
(floodlit)

Essex; 205/4 (20 overs)	v	Kent; 169/7 (20 overs)
Alastair Cook 77 (55); James Tredwell 1/33 (4)		Martin van Jaarsveld 33 (25); Grant Flower 3/26 (4)

Essex won by 36 runs
County Ground, Chelmsford
Umpires: Nick Cook and Tim Robinson
Player of the match: Grant Flower (Essex)

4 June 2009
(floodlit)

Sussex; 131/3 (20 overs)	v	Kent; 61/0 (11 overs)
Dwayne Smith 69 (59); Darren Stevens 1/11 (2)		Joe Denly 32* (32)

Sussex won by 2 runs (Duckworth–Lewis method)
County Ground, Hove
Umpires: Rob Bailey and Vanburn Holder
Player of the match: Dwayne Smith (Sussex)

- Floodlight failure forced an early conclusion, Kent required 64 runs at the time of abandonment under the Duckworth–Lewis method.

22 June 2009

Kent; 182/4 (20 overs)	v	Hampshire; 174/7 (20 overs)
Rob Key 58* (52); Dimitri Mascarenhas 2/19 (4)		Michael Lumb 59 (33); Ryan McLaren 2/31 (4)

Kent won by 8 runs
Nevill Ground, Royal Tunbridge Wells
Umpires: Neil Bainton and Ian Gould
Player of the match: Darren Stevens (Kent)

24 June 2009

Kent; 168/6 (20 overs)	v	Surrey; 167 (19.4 overs)
Martin van Jaarsveld 54 (32); Chris Schofield 2/42 (4)		Usman Afzaal 62 (41); Darren Stevens 2/21 (4)

Kent won by 1 run
The Oval, London
Umpires: Neil Bainton and Ian Gould
Player of the match: Martin van Jaarsveld (Kent)

26 June 2009
(floodlit)

Hampshire; 131/7 (20 overs)	v	Kent; 132/3 (17.5 overs)
Dimitri Mascarenhas 45* (36); Ryan McLaren 2/17 (3)		Darren Stevens 62* (42); Dimitri Mascarenhas 1/21 (4)

Kent won by 7 wickets
The Rose Bowl, Southampton
Umpires: Rob Bailey and Martin Bodenham
Player of the match: Darren Stevens (Kent)

28 June 2009

Kent; 184/7 (20 overs)	v	Surrey; 168/9 (20 overs)
Martin van Jaarsveld 64 (40); Matthew Spriegel 4/33 (4)		Chris Murtagh 28 (23); Ryan McLaren 4/37 (4)

Kent won by 16 runs
County Ground, Beckenham
Umpires: Vanburn Holder and David Millns
Player of the match: Martin van Jaarsveld (Kent)

27 July 2009

Kent; 149/7 (20 overs)	v	Durham; 93 (17.2 overs)
Joe Denly 31 (30); Ben Harmison 3/24 (3)		Dale Benkenstein 47 (42); James Tredwell 3/18 (4)

Kent won by 56 runs
St Lawrence Ground, Canterbury
Umpires: Barry Dudleston and Jeff Evans
Player of the match: James Tredwell (Kent)

15 August 2009

Kent; 145/5 (20 overs)	v	Somerset; 146/3 (18.5 overs)
Darren Stevens 77 (51); Alfonso Thomas 2/26 (4)		Marcus Trescothick 56 (32); James Tredwell 2/25 (4)

Somerset won by 7 wickets
Edgbaston, Birmingham
Umpires: Rob Bailey and Ian Gould
Player of the match: Marcus Trescothick (Somerset)

== Tables ==
=== County Championship Division Two ===
Team	Pld	W	T	L	D	A	Bat	Bwl	Adj	Pts
Kent	16	8	0	3	5	0	43	44	0	219
Essex	16	6	0	3	7	0	40	43	−1	194
Northamptonshire	16	6	0	4	6	0	40	45	0	193
Gloucestershire	16	6	0	6	4	0	39	46	0	185
Glamorgan	16	2	0	2	12	0	56	43	0	175
Derbyshire	16	2	0	3	11	0	55	45	0	172
Surrey	16	1	0	4	11	0	54	36	0	148
Middlesex	16	2	0	7	7	0	43	41	0	140
Leicestershire	16	2	0	3	11	0	31	35	0	138

=== Friends Provident Trophy Group B ===
Team	Pld	W	T	L	NR	Pts	NRR
Somerset Sabres	8	7	0	0	1	15	+2.001
Middlesex Panthers	8	4	0	4	0	8	+0.137
Warwickshire Bears	8	3	1	3	1	8	+0.468
Kent Spitfires	8	3	1	4	0	7	−0.409
Scottish Saltires	8	1	0	7	0	2	−1.783

=== Natwest Pro40 League Division Two ===
Team	Pld	W	L	T	N/R	Pts	Net R/R
Warwickshire Bears	8	5	0	1	2	13	+1.268
Middlesex Crusaders	8	5	1	0	2	12	+0.993
Kent Spitfires	8	4	3	0	1	9	-0.629
Northamptonshire Steelbacks	8	3	2	1	2	9	+0.600
Lancashire Lightning	8	3	3	0	2	8	–0.193
Glamorgan Dragons	8	2	4	0	2	6	–0.362
Derbyshire Phantoms	8	2	4	0	2	6	–0.572
Leicestershire Foxes	8	2	5	0	1	5	–0.231
Surrey Brown Caps	8	2	6	0	0	4	–0.762

=== Twenty20 Cup South Group ===
Team	Pld	W	L	T	NR	Pts	NRR
Kent Spitfires	10	7	2	0	1	15	+0.639
Sussex Sharks	10	7	3	0	0	14	+0.315
Hampshire Hawks	10	6	4	0	0	12	+0.853
Essex Eagles	10	5	4	0	1	11	+0.153
Surrey Brown Caps	10	2	8	0	0	4	–0.661
Middlesex Crusaders	10	2	8	0	0	4	–1.186
