= 2009 Twenty20 Cup South Division =

2009 Twenty20 Cup South Division (Part of the 2009 Twenty20 Cup)
- Administrator(s): England and Wales Cricket Board
- Cricket format: Twenty20
- Tournament format(s): Group stage
- Participants: Essex Eagles; Hampshire Hawks; Kent Spitfires; Middlesex Panthers; Surrey Brown Caps; Sussex Sharks
- Matches: 30
- Most runs: Michael Lumb (416 for Hampshire)
- Most wickets: Alfonso Thomas (15 for Somerset)

The South Division of the 2009 Twenty20 Cup determined which counties would qualify for the knockout stage of the 2009 Twenty20 Cup. Kent and Sussex qualified automatically, while Hampshire qualified as the second-best of the third-placed finishers.

== Table ==
Team	Pld	W	L	T	N/R	Pts	Net R/R
Kent Spitfires	10	7	2	0	1	15	+0.639
Sussex Sharks	10	7	3	0	0	14	+0.315
Hampshire Hawks	10	6	4	0	0	12	+0.853
Essex Eagles	10	5	4	0	1	11	+0.153
Surrey Brown Caps	10	2	8	0	0	4	–0.661
Middlesex Crusaders	10	2	8	0	0	4	–1.186

== Matches ==
=== 25 May ===
25 May

Sussex Sharks; 133/8 (20 overs)	v	Hampshire Hawks; 137/1 (16.1 overs)
DR Smith 63 (47); H Riazuddin 3/15 [4]		JHK Adams 68* (49); DR Smith 1/27 [2]

Hampshire won by 9 wickets
Rose Bowl, Southampton
Umpires: JW Lloyds and JF Steele
Player of the match: H Riazuddin (Hampshire)

25 May

Essex Eagles; 187/7 (20 overs)	v	Kent Spitfires; 16/0 (3.2 overs)
AN Cook 80 (56); Azhar Mahmood 2/33 [4]		JL Denly 9* (10)

No result
St Lawrence Ground, Canterbury
Umpires: NL Bainton and Trevor Jesty
Player of the match: Not awarded

25 May

Surrey Brown Caps; 186/1 (20 overs)	v	Middlesex Panthers; 129/7 (20 overs)
U Afzaal 98* (59); CEW Silverwood 1/30 [4]		T Henderson 32 (23); CP Schofield 3/21 [4]

Surrey won by 57 runs
Lord's Cricket Ground, London
Umpires: MJD Bodenham and P Willey
Player of the match: U Afzaal (Surrey)

=== 26 May ===
26 May
(day/night)

Sussex Sharks; 184/9 (20 overs)	v	Surrey Brown Caps; 163/9 (20 overs)
LJ Wright 58 (46); CP Schofield 2/32 [4]		SA Newman 38 (29); MH Yardy 3/21 [4]

Sussex won by 21 runs
The Oval, London
Umpires: NL Bainton and NGB Cook
Player of the match: LJ Wright (Sussex)

=== 27 May ===
27 May
(day/night)

Kent Spitfires; 191/3 (20 overs)	v	Middlesex Panthers; 129/8 (20 overs)
M van Jaarsveld 75* (53); A Richardson 2/25 [4]		SD Udal 26* (18); JC Tredwell 2/14 [4]

Kent won by 62 runs
Lord's Cricket Ground, London
Umpires: MJD Bodenham and G Sharp
Player of the match: DI Stevens (Kent)

27 May
(day/night)

Surrey Brown Caps; 125/8 (20 overs)	v	Hampshire Hawks; 124/9 (20 overs)
SJ Walters 30 (22); LA Dawson 2/18 [4]		CC Benham 39 (37); GD Elliott 2/13 [4]

Surrey won by 1 run
The Oval, London
Umpires: NL Bainton and NGB Cook
Player of the match: GD Elliott (Surrey)

=== 28 May ===
28 May
(day/night)

Sussex Sharks; 148 (19.4 overs)	v	Essex Eagles; 131 (19.1 overs)
RS Bopara 45 (31); Yasir Arafat 2/16 [3.4]		DR Smith 30 (23); CJC Wright 4/24 [4]

Essex won by 17 runs
County Ground, Hove
Umpires: MJD Bodenham and P Willey
Player of the match: CJC Wright (Essex)

=== 29 May ===
29 May
(day/night)

Surrey Brown Caps; 165/5 (20 overs)	v	Essex Eagles; 169/6 (19.5 overs)
SA Newman 81* (60); DD Masters 2/34 [4]		RS Bopara 53 (41); MNW Spriegel 2/33 [4]

Essex won by 4 wickets
County Ground, Chelmsford
Umpires: IJ Gould and RK Illingworth
Player of the match: SA Newman (Surrey)

29 May

Middlesex Panthers; 104/6 (20 overs)	v	Kent Spitfires; 107/6 (18.2 overs)
T Henderson 31 (37); RH Joseph 2/14 [4]		R McLaren 31 (43); A Richardson 3/29 [4]

Kent won by 4 wickets
St Lawrence Ground, Canterbury
Umpires: NL Bainton and NJ Llong
Player of the match: RH Joseph (Kent)

29 May

Hampshire Hawks; 122/7 (20 overs)	v	Sussex Sharks; 128/2 (17.1 overs)
MA Carberry 36 (38); DR Smith 2/2 [1]		CD Nash 56* (47); Imran Tahir 1/25 [4]

Sussex won by 8 wickets
County Ground, Hove
Umpires: MJD Bodenham and P Willey
Player of the match: CD Nash (Sussex)

=== 31 May ===
31 May

Hampshire Hawks; 191/6 (20 overs)	v	Surrey Brown Caps; 173/8 (20 overs)
MJ Lumb 54 (31); CP Schofield 2/32 [4]		MR Ramprakash 73 (47); DG Cork 2/22 [4]

Hampshire won by 18 runs
Rose Bowl, Southampton
Umpires: MJD Bodenham and NGC Cowley
Player of the match: MR Ramprakash (Surrey)

31 May

Sussex Sharks; 132/7 (20 overs)	v	Kent Spitfires; 133/5 (17 overs)
Yasir Arafat 43 (34); Azhar Mahmood 3/16 [4]		GO Jones 56 (39); RJ Kirtley 2/15 [2]

Kent won by 5 wickets
St Lawrence Ground, Canterbury
Umpires: NL Bainton and NGB Cook
Player of the match: GO Jones (Kent)

=== 1 June ===
1 June
(day/night)

Essex Eagles; 205/4 (20 overs)	v	Kent Spitfires; 169/7 (20 overs)
AN Cook 77 (55); JC Tredwell 1/33 [4]		M van Jaarsveld 33 (25); GW Flower 3/26 [4]

Essex won by 36 runs
County Ground, Chelmsford
Umpires: NGB Cook and RT Robinson
Player of the match: GW Flower (Essex)

1 June
(day/night)

Middlesex Panthers; 116 (19.3 overs)	v	Sussex Sharks; 120/3 (16.3 overs)
GK Berg 33 (28); RJ Hamilton-Brown 3/15 [3]		RJ Hamilton-Brown 69 (47); DJ Malan 2/21 [4]

Sussex won by 7 wickets
County Ground, Hove
Umpires: NL Bainton and G Sharp
Player of the match: RJ Hamilton-Brown (Sussex)

=== 2 June ===
2 June
(day/night)

Hampshire Hawks; 181/6 (20 overs)	v	Middlesex Panthers; 125 (19 overs)
MA Carberry 56 (51); SD Udal 2/23 [4]		BA Godleman 34 (38); SM Ervine 4/16 [4]

Hampshire won by 56 runs
Uxbridge Cricket Club Ground, London
Umpires: RJ Bailey and MA Gough
Player of the match: SM Ervine (Hampshire)

=== 3 June ===
3 June
(day/night)

Essex Eagles; 126/7 (20 overs)	v	Sussex Sharks; 130/2 (18.2 overs)
V Chopra 26 (26); DR Smith 3/19 [4]		MW Goodwin 64* (54); MA Hardinges 2/12 [2]

Sussex won by 8 wickets
County Ground, Chelmsford
Umpires: PJ Hartley and RK Illingworth
Player of the match: V Chopra (Essex)

=== 4 June ===
4 June
(day/night)

Hampshire Hawks; 219/2 (20 overs)	v	Essex Eagles; 144 (18.4 overs)
MJ Lumb 124* (69); MA Chambers 1/32 [4]		MJ Walker 50 (33); SM Ervine 3/19 [3]

Hampshire won by 75 runs
Rose Bowl, Southampton
Umpires: NGC Cowley and JF Steele
Player of the match: MJ Lumb (Hampshire)

4 June
(day/night)

Sussex Sharks; 131/3 (20 overs)	v	Kent Spitfires; 61/0 (11 overs)
DR Smith 69* (59); DI Stevens 1/11 [2]		JL Denly 32* (32)

Sussex won by 2 runs (D/L)
County Ground, Hove
Umpires: RJ Bailey and VA Holder
Player of the match: DR Smith (Sussex)

- Play was halted due to a floodlight failure; Kent's target after 11 overs was 64.

=== 22 June ===
22 June
(day/night)

Middlesex Panthers; 148 (19.2 overs)	v	Essex Eagles; 151/2 (19 overs)
DJ Malan 31 (22); Danish Kaneria 3/21 [3.2]		ML Pettini 80* (57); DJ Malan 1/17 [3]

Essex won by 8 wickets
County Ground, Chelmsford
Umpires: NGB Cook and G Sharp
Player of the match: ML Pettini (Essex)

22 June

Kent Spitfires; 182/4 (20 overs)	v	Hampshire Hawks; 174/7 (20 overs)
RWT Key 58* (52); AD Mascarenhas 2/19 [4]		MJ Lumb 59 (33); R McLaren 2/31 [4]

Kent won by 8 runs
Nevill Ground, Royal Tunbridge Wells
Umpires: NL Bainton and IJ Gould
Player of the match: DI Stevens (Kent)

22 June

Surrey Brown Caps; 123 (20 overs)	v	Sussex Sharks; 125/4 (16.5 overs)
MR Ramprakash 20 (14); RSC Martin-Jenkins 3/17 [3]		MW Goodwin 38 (43); U Afzaal 2/17 [2]

Sussex won by 6 wickets
County Ground, Hove
Umpires: MR Benson and MJD Bodenham
Player of the match: RSC Martin-Jenkins (Sussex)

=== 23 June ===
23 June

Hampshire Hawks; 183/6 (20 overs)	v	Middlesex Panthers; 155/5 (20 overs)
MJ Lumb 93 (52); DJ Malan 1/10 [2]		BA Godleman 57 (47); CT Tremlett 2/28 [4]

Hampshire won by 28 runs
Rose Bowl, Southampton
Umpires: TE Jesty and JW Lloyds
Player of the match: MJ Lumb (Hampshire)

=== 24 June ===
24 June

Kent Spitfires; 168/6 (20 overs)	v	Surrey Brown Caps; 167 (19.4 overs)
M van Jaarsveld 54 (32); CP Schofield 2/42 [4]		U Afzaal 62 (41); DI Stevens 2/21 [4]

Kent won by 1 run
The Oval, London
Umpires: NL Bainton and IJ Gould
Player of the match: M van Jaarsveld (Kent)

=== 25 June ===
25 June

Essex Eagles; 210/3 (20 overs)	v	Surrey Brown Caps; 126 (15.2 overs)
AN Cook 100* (57); GD Elliott 2/37 [4]		U Afzaal 30 (16); Danish Kaneria 2/13 [2.2]

Essex won by 84 runs
The Oval, London
Umpires: RJ Bailey and TE Jesty
Player of the match: AN Cook (Essex)

=== 26 June ===
26 June

Hampshire Hawks; 131/7 (20 overs)	v	Kent Spitfires; 132/3 (17.5 overs)
AD Mascarenhas 45* (36); R McLaren 2/17 [3]		DI Stevens 62* (42); AD Mascarenhas 1/21 [4]

Kent won by 7 wickets
Rose Bowl, Southampton
Umpires: RJ Bailey and MJD Bodenham
Player of the match: DI Stevens (Kent)

26 June

Middlesex Panthers; 166/5 (20 overs)	v	Essex Eagles; 143 (19.2 overs)
NJ Dexter 75 (51); Danish Kaneria 2/37 [4]		V Chopra 51 (42); T Henderson 3/34 [4]

Middlesex won by 23 runs
Lord's Cricket Ground, London
Umpires: NL Bainton and MR Benson
Player of the match: NJ Dexter (Middlesex)

=== 27 June ===
27 June

Surrey Brown Caps; 160/5 (20 overs)	v	Middlesex Panthers; 162/3 (18.2 overs)
MJ Brown 77 (54); CEW Silverwood 1/27 [4]		OA Shah 61* (41); CJ Jordan 1/21 [3]

Middlesex won by 7 wickets
The Oval, London
Umpires: NL Bainton and DJ Millns
Player of the match: OA Shah (Middlesex)

=== 28 June ===
28 June

Essex Eagles; 149/6 (20 overs)	v	Hampshire Hawks; 153/4 (19.1 overs)
GR Napier 47 (33); SM Ervine 3/26 [4]		SM Ervine 39 (22); GW Flower 3/25 [4]

Hampshire won by 6 wickets
County Ground, Chelmsford
Umpires: SA Garratt and JW Lloyds
Player of the match: SM Ervine (Hampshire)

28 June

Kent Spitfires; 184/7 (20 overs)	v	Surrey Brown Caps; 168/9 (20 overs)
M van Jaarsveld 64 (40); MNW Spriegel 4/33 [4]		CP Murtagh 28 (23); R McLaren 4/37 [4]

Kent won by 16 runs
County Ground, Beckenham
Umpires: VA Holder and DJ Millns
Player of the match: M van Jaarsveld (Kent)

28 June

Middlesex Panthers; 127/8 (20 overs)	v	Sussex Sharks; 130/4 (19 overs)
GK Berg 30 (20); Yasir Arafat 2/13 [4]		EC Joyce 41* (33); DA Burton 2/13 [4]

Sussex won by 6 wickets
Lord's Cricket Ground, London
Umpires: B Dudleston and JF Steele
Player of the match: CD Nash (Sussex)
