= Warren Lee =

Warren Lee may refer to:

- Warren Lee (cricketer) (born 1987), Indian-born English cricketer
- Warren Lee (footballer) (born 1958), Australian rules footballer
- Warren Lee (pianist), Hong Kong-born pianist and music educator
- Warren Lee (Singaporean politician), see Sembawang Group Representation Constituency#Members of Parliament
- Warren I. Lee (1876–1955), U.S. Representative from New York

== See also ==
- Lee Warren (born 1969), English footballer
- Gerald Lee Warren (born 1930), American journalist and newspaper editor at the San Diego Union-Tribune
