= Phil Edwards (cricketer) =

English cricketer

Philip Edwards
Personal information
- Full name: Philip Duncan Edwards
- Born: 16 April 1984 (age 42); Minster, Isle of Sheppey, Kent
- Batting: Right-handed
- Bowling: Right-arm fast-medium
- Role: Bowler

Domestic team information
- Years: Team
- 2004–2005: Cambridge UCCE
- 2007–2011: Suffolk
- 2009–2010: Kent (squad no. 27)

Career statistics
Competition	First-class	List A
Matches	12	7
Runs scored	121	3
Batting average	17.28	3.00
100s/50s	0/0	0/0
Top score	43	2*
Balls bowled	1,482	204
Wickets	15	7
Bowling average	64.33	34.42
5 wickets in innings	0	0
10 wickets in match	0	0
Best bowling	3/72	3/57
Catches/stumpings	2/–	0/–
- Source: CricInfo, 18 October 2009

Philip Duncan Edwards (born 16 April 1984) is an English former professional cricketer. He was born at Minster on the Isle of Sheppey in Kent in 1984.

Edwards is a graduate of Anglia Ruskin University and played first-class cricket for Cambridge University Centre of Cricketing Excellence (UCCE) between 2004 and 2005. He made his first-class debut for the UCCE against Essex at Fenner's in April 2004 and played five first-class matches for the UCCE.

Edwards had played some matches for Kent's Second XI in 2003 and 2004 and went on to play for Sussex Second XI in 2006 and 2007 as well as making one appearance for Derbyshire Second XI in 2007. He played in the Minor Counties Championship for Suffolk in 2007 before returning to play in Kent, including for the county Second XI, in 2008. In 2009 he was awarded a developmental contract at Kent and made his senior debut for the county in April 2009. He made his debut in the County Championship later the same month and was part of Kent's promotion winning team of 2009.

During 2009 Edwards played in four County Championship matches, taking seven wickets. He also played in nine matches in the 2009 Pro40 league for the county, the only List A appearances of his professional career. His contract was renewed at the end of the season but after playing only twice for the First XI in 2010 Edwards was released by Kent in August. He played again for Suffolk in 2011.

Edwards has played local club cricket in the Kent Cricket League (KCL) and the East Anglian Premier Cricket League (EAPL). He has played for a variety of clubs, including Cambridge Granta and Bury St Edmunds in the EAPL, Camden Cricket Club in local Cambridgeshire cricket and Gore Court in Sittingbourne in the KCL.
