= Paul Muchall =

English cricketer (born 1987)

Personal information
- Full name: Paul Bernard Muchall
- Born: 17 March 1987 (age 39); Newcastle-upon-Tyne, Tyne and Wear
- Batting: Right handed
- Bowling: Right-arm medium-fast
- Role: All-rounder
- Relatives: Gordon Muchall (brother)

Domestic team information
- Years: Team
- 2006–2009: Northumberland
- 2010: Kent
- 2012–2013: Gloucestershire
- FC debut: 5 April 2012 Gloucestershire v Essex
- Last FC: 6 August 2012 Gloucestershire v Hampshire
- LA debut: 4 September 2010 Kent v Durham
- Last LA: 6 May 2012 Gloucestershire v Netherlands

Career statistics
Competition	First-class	List A
Matches	4	2
Runs scored	82	22
Batting average	16.40	11.00
100s/50s	0/0	0/0
Top score	23	22
Balls bowled	236	36
Wickets	2	1
Bowling average	109.00	58.00
5 wickets in innings	0	0
10 wickets in match	0	0
Best bowling	2/60	1/34
Catches/stumpings	1/–	1/–
- Source: CricInfo, 29 September 2018

Paul Bernard Muchall (born 17 March 1987) is a former English professional cricketer who played for Kent County Cricket Club and Gloucestershire County Cricket Club between 2010 and 2013.

Muchall was born in Newcastle-upon-Tyne in 1987 and was a member of Durham's cricket academy. He played minor counties cricket for Northumberland County Cricket Club between 2006 and 2009 as well as appearing for Durham Second XI as an all-rounder. He moved to Kent in 2010, playing for Gore Court in the Kent Cricket League and made his List A cricket debut for Kent in the 2010 Clydesdale Bank 40, the only appearance he made for the county First XI before returning to Durham and then moving to Gloucestershire at the start of the 2012 season. He had also played for and captained the MCC Young Cricketers team in 2010 and 2011.

He made his first-class cricket debut for his new county in 2012, playing four first-class and one limited overs match for the First XI, all in 2012. A knee injury before the start of the 2013 season required an operation and restricted Muchall to Second XI appearances during the season. He left the county at the end of the season with the aim of moving into coaching. He has played club cricket for a variety of teams since leaving the professional game. As of September 2018 Muchall is the head coach of Bath Cricket Club.

Muchall's brother Gordon played for Durham between 2002 and 2016. Another brother Matthew and his grandfather Bernard Muchall both played for Northumberland.
