= Mark Lawson (cricketer) =

English cricketer

Personal information
- Full name: Mark Anthony Kenneth Lawson
- Born: 24 October 1985 (age 41); Leeds, England
- Height: 5 ft 8 in (1.73 m)
- Batting: Right-handed
- Bowling: Right-arm leg spin
- Role: Bowler

Domestic team information
- Years: Team
- 2004–2008: Yorkshire
- 2008: Middlesex
- 2009: Derbyshire
- 2010: Kent
- FC debut: 21 July 2004 Yorkshire v Somerset
- Last FC: 28 June 2010 Kent v Pakistan
- LA debut: 20 September 2005 Yorkshire v Warwickshire
- Last LA: 23 August 2009 Derbyshire v Kent

Career statistics
Competition	FC	LA	T20
Matches	24	12	10
Runs scored	311	37	5
Batting average	14.80	9.25	–
100s/50s	0/0	0/0	0/0
Top score	44	20	4*
Balls bowled	3,261	469	174
Wickets	52	9	9
Bowling average	43.82	50.22	28.00
5 wickets in innings	4	0	0
10 wickets in match	0	0	0
Best bowling	6/88	2/36	2/20
Catches/stumpings	10/–	4/–	1/–
- Source: CricInfo, 5 July 2011

Mark Anthony Kenneth Lawson (born 24 October 1985) is an English former first-class cricketer. A leg spinner, he most recently played first-class cricket for Kent County Cricket Club in June 2010. He has also played for Yorkshire, Derbyshire, Middlesex and Staffordshire.

== Biography ==
Born in Leeds, Yorkshire, Lawson was educated at Castle Hall College. He was selected for the North of England Under 14/15 and he made his Second XI debut for Yorkshire in 2003. He made his first-class debut against Somerset at North Marine Road Ground, Scarborough in July 2004.

He toured Australia with the England Under 19 team, played against South Africa in 2003, and was a member of the squad for the Under 19 World Cup in Bangladesh in February 2004. He is given specialised coaching by Terry Jenner as part of the ECB's Elite Wrist Spin Programme. He played in two Tests and four one-day games on the Under 19 tour to India in 2005, and in an Under 19 one day international against Sri Lanka in England the following summer. When not on first-class duties he played for Barnsley Cricket Club in the Yorkshire ECB County Premier League. In July 2008, he moved to Middlesex on a short-term loan for one month, to help with their intensive match schedule whilst their bowlers recover from injury.

Yorkshire announced his release towards the end of the 2008 season, and he was subsequently registered by Derbyshire with the opportunity to earn a full-time contract. He moved to Kent in 2010, but first team opportunities proved elusive and he was released.

Formally Head coach at Pro Coach, Headingley, Mark is now Director of Cricket at ML Cricket Academy, Leeds.
