= Geraint Jones =

Professional cricketer

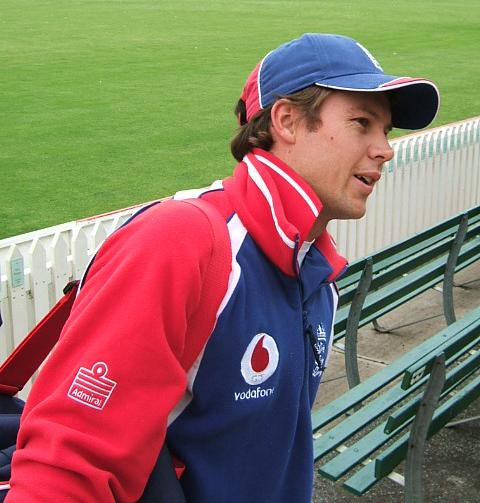
- Jones in 2006

Personal information
- Full name: Geraint Owen Jones
- Born: 14 July 1976 (age 50); Kundiawa, Papua New Guinea
- Height: 5 ft 10 in (1.78 m)
- Batting: Right-handed
- Role: Wicket-keeper

International information
- National sides: England (2004–2006); Papua New Guinea (2012–2014)
- Test debut (cap 623): 10 April 2004; England v West Indies
- Last Test: 14 December 2006; England v Australia
- ODI debut (cap 181/5): 27 June 2004; England v West Indies
- Last ODI: 9 November 2014; PNG v Hong Kong
- ODI shirt no.: 10
- T20I debut (cap 5): 13 June 2005; England v Australia
- Last T20I: 15 June 2006; England v Sri Lanka
- T20I shirt no.: 10

Domestic team information
- Years: Team
- 2001–2014: Kent (squad no. 9)
- 2014: → Gloucestershire (on loan)
- 2015: Gloucestershire (squad no. 8)

Career statistics
Competition	Test	ODI	FC	LA
Matches	34	51	203	213
Runs scored	1,172	862	9,087	3,679
Batting average	23.91	24.62	32.45	25.72
100s/50s	1/6	0/4	15/50	0/17
Top score	100	80	178	87
Catches/stumpings	128/5	68/4	599/36	209/42
- Source: CricInfo, 30 March 2016

Geraint Owen Jones MBE (born 14 July 1976) is a former cricketer who played for both England and Papua New Guinea. Born to Welsh parents in Papua New Guinea, Jones was the first-choice wicketkeeper for the England cricket team between 2004 and 2006. He later played international cricket for Papua New Guinea from 2012 to 2014. He announced his retirement from first-class cricket in July 2015 following his resignation as the first-class cricket captain of Gloucestershire County Cricket Club.

== Personal life ==
Jones was born in Kundiawa, Papua New Guinea, and moved to Australia with his parents, who were originally from Wales, soon after he was born. He grew up in Toowoomba where he played in the under 21 team in the annual Spring Street Church cricket match. He went on to play in Brisbane, Queensland, played for the Queensland Colts (Under-21) team, and was awarded the wicketkeeper's trophy for most dismissals in the Brisbane Grade Cricket competition in 1995/96 when he was 19/20. His first club in England was Lydney CC in the Forest of Dean but he returned to live in Australia until he was 22. Upon his return to Britain he played for Clevedon CC. The following season he joined Abergavenny CC and was later appointed captain. Whilst at Abergavenny he trained as a pharmacist. He met his wife whilst playing for Clevedon; the couple has two sons.

After retiring, Jones joined Brentwood School as their cricket professional in November 2015. He also worked as a business studies teacher. In 2019 he trained to become a retained firefighter with Kent Fire and Rescue Service.

== Career ==
=== Domestic career ===
Jones spent most of his career playing for Kent County Cricket Club. He made his debut for Kent in 2001 after having played Second XI cricket for the team the previous season. He was capped by the club in 2003, and played in more than 380 top-class matches for them, making his final appearance for the team in 2013. After losing his place in the Kent team to Sam Billings at the start of the 2014 season, Jones joined Gloucestershire on loan. He was released by Kent at the end of the season, and signed a two-year deal with Gloucestershire in October 2014, but retired after only a year with the club.

=== England career ===
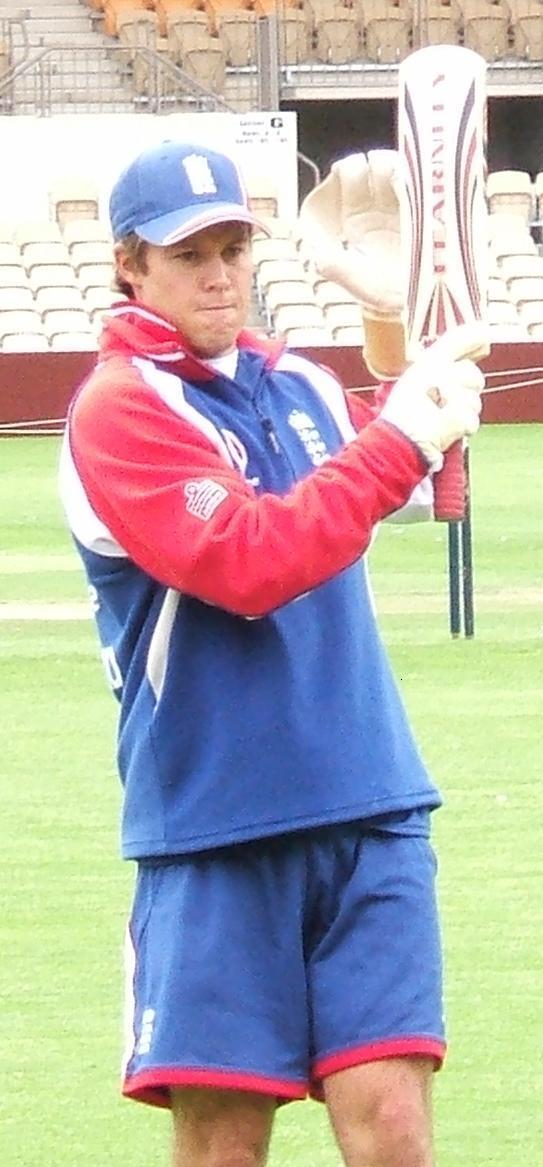
Jones practises at the Adelaide Oval during the 2006-07 Ashes.

Jones replaced Chris Read as England wicket-keeper during the 2004 tour of the West Indies. Later that year, playing against New Zealand, he scored his only Test match century. He toured South Africa in 2004/05

In 2005 he took the final catch of the 2005 Ashes Test at Edgbaston, ensuring an England victory by two runs. In the 2006 New Year Honours, Jones was awarded the MBE for playing in the successful Ashes series.

A succession of dropped catches and missed stumpings during his England career had caused many commentators to question whether his value to the team as a batsman was sufficient for him to hold his place against competition from more accomplished wicket-keepers such as Read and James Foster. Until mid-2006, the England selectors maintained faith in Jones believing that he offset his mistakes with several well-timed performances with the bat. His batting form tailed off and, after suffering a broken finger, he was replaced by Chris Read for the third Test against Pakistan in 2006.

Jones was not awarded a 12-month central contract for 2007, although neither was Read and both players were selected for the 2006-07 Ashes series. Jones played the first three matches of the series but was dropped after poor performances and never regained his England place.

=== Papua New Guinea career ===
Jones played for Papua New Guinea in the 2012 ICC World Twenty20 Qualifiers in the United Arab Emirates. His best score was 46 off 33 balls in PNG's victory over Denmark. Papua New Guinea finished eighth out of 16.

He played again for PNG in the 2013 ICC World Twenty20 Qualifier, where he was a standout in the middle order for the team and provided much needed stability to the lineup, scoring 216 runs, with an average of 27 and a high score of 55. In early January 2014 he played in the 2014 WCQ held in NZ, top-scoring with 88 runs against Hong Kong, his highest score for PNG. PNG finished fourth in the tournament and were awarded One Day International and T20 International status by the International Cricket Council. Jones played in two ODI's for the team, both against Hong Kong in Townsville, Australia.

== Career best performances ==
Batting
Type of cricket	Score	Fixture	Venue	Season
Test match	100	England v New Zealand	Leeds	2004
ODI	80	England v Zimbabwe	Bulawayo	2004
T20I	19	England v Australia	Southampton	2005
First-class	178	Kent v Somerset	Canterbury	2010
List A	87	Gloucestershire v Leicestershire	Leicester	2015
Twenty20	56	Kent v Sussex	Canterbury	2009

== See also ==
- List of Test cricketers born in non-Test playing nations
