= Paul Dixey =

English cricketer

Personal information
- Full name: Paul Garrod Dixey
- Born: 2 November 1987 (age 39); Canterbury, Kent
- Height: 5 ft 9 in (1.75 m)
- Batting: Right-handed
- Role: Wicket-keeper

Domestic team information
- Years: Team
- 2005–2010: Kent (squad no. 2)
- 2007–2010: Durham UCCE
- 2011–2012: Leicestershire

Career statistics
Competition	First-class	List A
Matches	22	13
Runs scored	592	120
Batting average	17.41	13.33
100s/50s	1/2	0/0
Top score	103	42
Catches/stumpings	46/8	6/0
- Source: Cricinfo, 30 May 2017

Paul Garrod Dixey (born 2 November 1987) is a former English professional cricketer. He played County Cricket as a right-handed batsman and wicket-keeper.

== Cricket career ==
Dixey was born in Canterbury in Kent and attended King's School in the city. He made his first-class cricket debut as a 17 year old for Kent County Cricket Club in August 2005 against Bangladesh A, scoring 40 runs and taking three catches. He made one Youth Test match appearance for the England Under-19 cricket team in 2006 and gained three Youth ODI caps for the team in the same year. In 2007 Dixey made his List A cricket debut for Kent

He studied Natural Sciences at Durham University and played for Durham UCCE between 2007 and 2009, making nine first-class appearances whilst remaining on Kent's staff. He scored his only first-class century for the UCCE against Lancashire in April 2009. Dixey was released by Kent at the end of the 2010 season and he signed a trial contract with Leicestershire for the 2011 season as deputy wicket-keeper to Tom New. He played nine first-class and nine List A matches for Leicestershire in 2011 and 2012, making his County Championship debut in the process, never having played Championship cricket for Kent.

== Retirement ==
After suffering a number of injuries, Dixey retired from professional cricket in August 2012 at the age of 25 in order to pursue other career options. He has worked as an Investment Manager for Quilter Cheviot, an Asset Management company based in London.
