= 2009 NatWest Pro40 =

- Administrator: England and Wales Cricket Board
- Cricket format: Limited overs cricket (40 overs)
- Tournament format: League system
- Champions: Sussex Sharks (2nd title)
- Participants: 18
- Matches: 72
- Most runs: 458 Nick Compton
- Most wickets: 13 Nicky Boje

The 2009 NatWest Pro40 was a league system 40 over competition. Sussex Sharks won Division One, while Warwickshire Bears finished top of Division Two.

This was the last year the competition was held. It was succeeded by the Clydesdale Bank 40, which combined a league format with knockout stages.

== Division One ==
Team	Pld	W	L	T	N/R	Pts	Net R/R
Sussex Sharks ^{C}	8	6	2	0	0	12	+1.253
Somerset Sabres	8	5	2	0	1	11	+1.137
Worcestershire Royals	8	5	2	0	1	11	-0.331
Essex Eagles	8	5	3	0	0	10	+0.332
Hampshire Hawks	8	4	4	0	0	8	+0.234
Durham Dynamos	8	4	4	0	0	8	–0.354
Yorkshire Carnegie	8	2	5	0	1	5	-0.184
Gloucestershire Gladiators ^{R}	8	2	5	0	1	5	–0.358
Nottinghamshire Outlaws ^{R}	8	0	6	0	2	2	–2.411

== Division two ==
Team	Pld	W	L	T	N/R	Pts	Net R/R
Warwickshire Bears ^{P}	8	5	0	1	2	13	+1.268
Middlesex Crusaders ^{P}	8	5	1	0	2	12	+0.993
Kent Spitfires	8	4	3	0	1	9	-0.629
Northamptonshire Steelbacks	8	3	2	1	2	9	+0.600
Lancashire Lightning	8	3	3	0	2	8	–0.193
Glamorgan Dragons	8	2	4	0	2	6	–0.362
Derbyshire Phantoms	8	2	4	0	2	6	–0.572
Leicestershire Foxes	8	2	5	0	1	5	–0.231
Surrey Brown Caps	8	2	6	0	0	4	–0.762
