= Chris Piesley =

English cricketer

Personal information
- Full name: Christopher Damien Piesley
- Born: 12 March 1992 (age 34); Chatham, Kent, England
- Batting: Left-handed
- Bowling: Right-arm off break

Domestic team information
- Years: Team
- 2010–2014: Kent (squad no. 32)
- First-class debut: 28 June 2010 Kent v Pakistanis
- Only List A: 17 July 2011 Kent v Netherlands

Career statistics
Competition	First-class	List A
Matches	3	1
Runs scored	69	4
Batting average	13.80	4.00
100s/50s	0/0	0/0
Top score	43	4
Catches/stumpings	0/–	0/–
- Source: CricketArchive, 14 March 2014

Christopher Damien Piesley (born 12 March 1992) is an English former professional cricketer. Piesley is a left-handed batsman who bowls right-arm off breaks. He was born at Chatham in Kent in 1992 and educated at Fulston Manor School in Sittingbourne.

Piesley made his first-class cricket debut for Kent County Cricket Club against the touring Pakistanis in 2010. After being dismissed for a duck in his first-innings, he scored 43 runs in Kent's second-innings, an innings praised by Kent coach Paul Farbrace. The innings was part of a first-wicket century partnership with Joe Denly, Pieseley playing as a "makeshift" opener. He made two further first-class appearances in the 2011 season, playing against Loughborough MCCU and against Gloucestershire in the County Championship and also made his List A debut against the Netherlands in the 2011 Clydesdale Bank 40.

Piesley was a member of Kent's age-group teams and his contract was renewed for the 2012 season. He was highly regarded at Kent as the county focussed on developing younger players, but was released at the end of the 2012 season, having failed to break into the county team. He was part of the MCC Young Cricketers team in 2013, playing for them in Second XI competitions in both 2013 and 2014. He continued to play for Kent's Second XI until 2014 and played matches for Sussex's Second Xi in 2014. Two of his brothers, Shaun and Richard, also played Second XI cricket for Kent. Piesley has played club cricket in the Kent Cricket League for Gore Court, Lordswood and Minster.
