= James Hockley =

English cricketer

Personal information
- Full name: James Bernard Hockley
- Born: 16 April 1979 (age 47); Beckenham, London
- Batting: Right-handed
- Bowling: Right arm off break

Domestic team information
- Years: Team
- 1998–2010: Kent (squad no. 20)

Career statistics
Competition	FC	LA	T20
Matches	30	71	10
Runs scored	804	1,595	53
Batting average	18.27	26.14	6.62
100s/50s	0/4	1/8	0/0
Top score	82	121	18
Balls bowled	624	90	29
Wickets	5	3	1
Bowling average	81.60	32.00	32.00
5 wickets in innings	0	0	0
10 wickets in match	0	0	0
Best bowling	1/8	2/32	1/9
Catches/stumpings	20/–	24/–	4/–
- Source: CricInfo, 7 June 2016

James Bernard Hockley (born 16 April 1979) is an English former professional cricketer who played for Kent County Cricket Club.

Born in Beckenham, Hockley made his first-class cricket debut in 1998 against Oxford University. Seen as a limited overs specialist, Hockley made 81 one-day appearances for the county. He was released at the end of the 2002 season.

Between 2002 and 2009, Hockley taught sports at Marlborough House School in Cranbrook, whilst continuing to play cricket for Hartley Country Club in the Kent Cricket League. His performances for Hartley prompted Kent to re-sign him ahead of the 2009 season and he played two more seasons for the county before returning to focus on teaching whilst still playing for Hartley.
