= Rob Ferley =

English cricketer (born 1982)

Personal information
- Full name: Robert Steven Ferley
- Born: 4 February 1982 (age 44); Norwich, Norfolk, England
- Height: 5 ft 8 in (1.73 m)
- Batting: Right-handed
- Bowling: Slow left-arm orthodox

Domestic team information
- Years: Team
- 1998: Norfolk
- 2001–2003: Durham UCCE
- 2003–2006: Kent
- 2007–2008: Nottinghamshire
- 2009–2010: Kent
- 2010: Dorset

Career statistics
Competition	FC	LA	T20
Matches	34	56	18
Runs scored	650	337	23
Batting average	20.96	16.04	7.66
100s/50s	0/2	0/1	0/0
Top score	78*	52	16*
Balls bowled	5,083	2,471	339
Wickets	66	66	14
Bowling average	45.72	30.75	29.64
5 wickets in innings	1	0	0
10 wickets in match	0	0	0
Best bowling	6/136	4/33	3/17
Catches/stumpings	10/–	21/–	4/–
- Source: CricInfo, 19 June 2017

Robert Steven Ferley (born 4 February 1982) is a former English professional cricketer who played for Kent County Cricket Club and Nottinghamshire County Cricket Club. He bowled slow left-arm orthodox spin. He was born in Norwich in 1982.

Ferley attended Sutton Valence School near Maidstone in Kent. He played for Norfolk County Cricket Club in the 1998 Minor Counties Championship and went on the English Under-19 cricket team to India, taking 4/32 in the second one-day International on the tour. He made his first-class cricket debut in April 2001 for Durham University Centre of Cricketing Excellence. He played nine times for the UCCE whilst studying at Durham University and made three appearances for the British Universities team whilst he was a student.

He made his Second XI debut for Kent in 1999 and made his List A cricket debut for the Kent Cricket Board in September 2001 in the second round of the 2002 Cheltenham & Gloucester Trophy. He made his senior Kent debut in July 2003 in the County Championship. Ferley left Kent to join Nottinghamshire at the end of the 2006 season after finding it difficult to dislodge Min Patel from the Kent team. He played for Nottinghamshire in 2007 and 2008 before returning to Kent for the 2009 and 2010 seasons before being released in July 2010.

Ferley played once for Dorset in the 2010 Minor Counties Championship. He worked as Director of Cricket at Eastbourne College before joining Bradfield College as Head of Cricket Performance in 2022.
