= Nigel Cowley =

English cricketer (born 1953)

Personal information
- Born: March 1, 1953 (age 73)
- Batting: Right-handed
- Bowling: Right-arm offbreak

Umpiring information
- WODIs umpired: 1 (2008)
- WT20Is umpired: 1 (2012)

Career statistics
Competition	First-class	List A
Matches	271	305
Runs scored	7,309	3,022
Batting average	23.35	16.69
100s/50s	2/36	0/5
Top score	109*	74
Balls bowled	32,662	11,704
Wickets	437	248
Bowling average	34.04	32.41
5 wickets in innings	5	1
10 wickets in match	0	0
Best bowling	6/48	5/24
Catches/stumpings	105/–	69/–
- Source: Cricinfo, 7 November 2022

Nigel Geoffrey Charles Cowley (born 1 March 1953) is a former English cricketer who played for Dorset, before finding fame with Glamorgan and Hampshire. He was born in Dorset.
