= Rob Key =

English cricketer (born 1979)

Robert Key
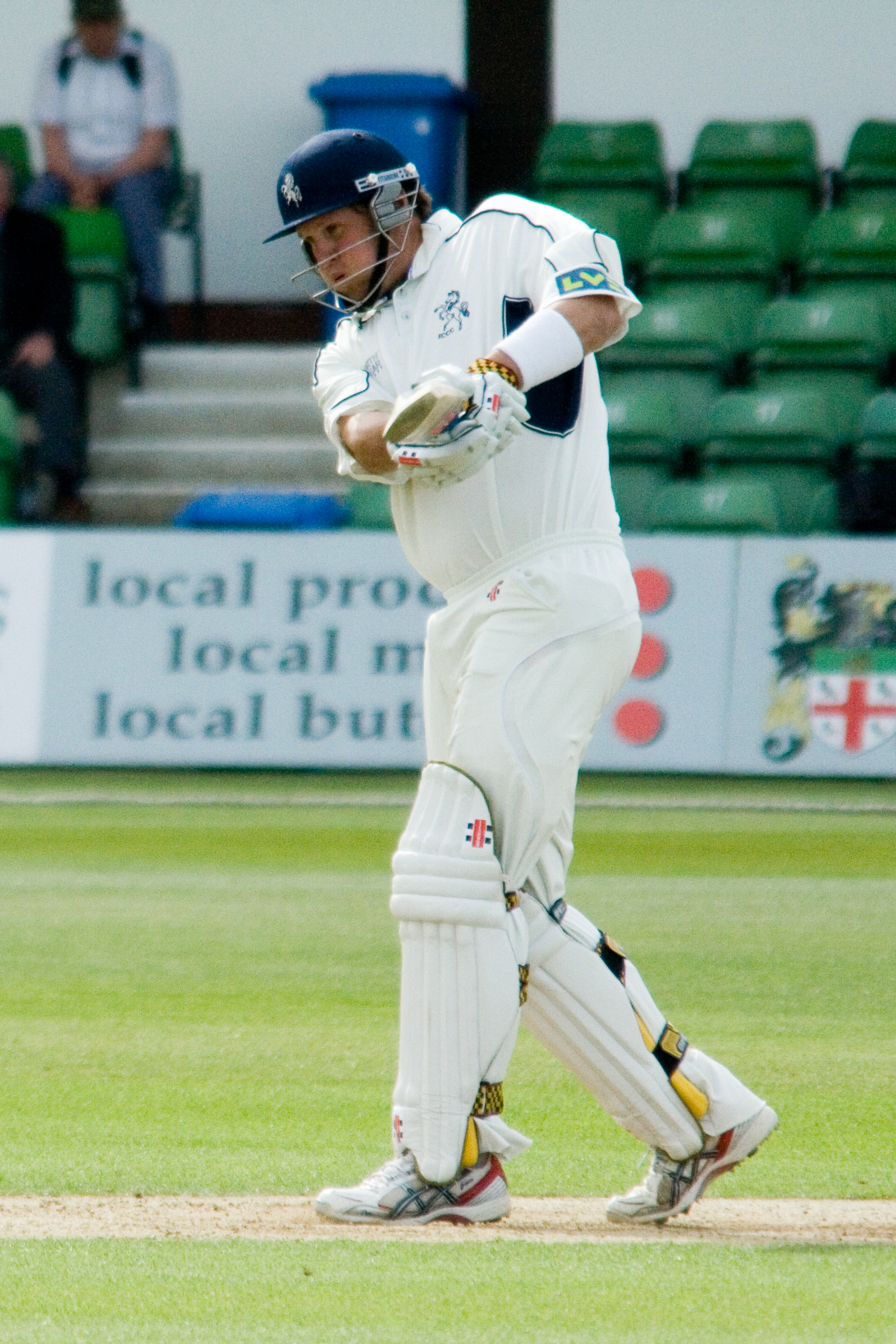
- Key bats for Kent against New Zealand at the St. Lawrence Ground in 2008.

Personal information
- Full name: Robert William Trevor Key
- Born: 12 May 1979 (age 47); East Dulwich, London, England
- Nickname: Keysy
- Height: 6 ft 1 in (1.85 m)
- Batting: Right-handed
- Bowling: Right-arm medium
- Role: Opening batsman

International information
- National side: England
- Test debut (cap 612): 8 August 2002 v India
- Last Test: 21 January 2005 v South Africa
- ODI debut (cap 178): 26 June 2003 v Zimbabwe
- Last ODI: 6 July 2004 v West Indies
- ODI shirt no.: 35
- Only T20I (cap 44): 5 June 2009 v Netherlands

Domestic team information
- Years: Team
- 1998–2016: Kent (squad no. 4)

Career statistics
Competition	Test	ODI	FC	LA
Matches	15	5	299	225
Runs scored	775	54	19,419	6,469
Batting average	31.00	10.80	40.45	32.18
100s/50s	1/3	0/0	54/76	8/37
Top score	221	19	270*	144*
Balls bowled	–	–	484	–
Wickets	–	–	3	–
Bowling average	–	–	110.33	–
5 wickets in innings	–	–	0	–
10 wickets in match	–	–	0	–
Best bowling	–	–	2/31	–
Catches/stumpings	11/–	0/–	155/–	46/–
- Source: CricInfo, 4 June 2020

Robert William Trevor Key (born 12 May 1979) is an English former cricketer and cricket commentator who played international cricket in all formats for England and domestic cricket for Kent County Cricket Club. He is the current managing director of the England cricket team.

A right-handed opening batsman, Key made appearances at age-group level for Kent from the age of eleven, moving up until he made his first-class debut in 1998. He made eight first-class and four List A appearances for England's youth teams, and was a member of the team that won the 1998 Under-19 Cricket World Cup. Following a season of heavy run-scoring, Key was called up to the England A team in 1999.

Following an injury to Marcus Trescothick, Key made his Test debut against India in 2002. He toured Australia during the 2002–03 Ashes series, where he justified his selection ahead of a more experienced player. His One Day International debut came in 2003, against Zimbabwe; however, he was dropped from both squads shortly after. An injury to Mark Butcher allowed Key back into the England team for the series against the West Indies in 2004. He scored his maiden Test hundred in the first match of the series, which later became his maiden first-class double century as he scored 221. This performance, coupled with the 93 he scored in the third Test, earned him recognition as one of the five Wisden Cricketers of the Year. Key's last Test matches came during England's tour of South Africa during 2004–05, where he managed to score 152 runs without being consistent, and despite a one-match return during the 2009 ICC World Twenty20, he has remained on the fringes of selection.

Key became Kent captain following the 2006 English cricket season, following David Fulton's resignation. He led Kent to a County Championship 2nd Division Championship title in 2010, two Twenty20 Cup Finals Day appearances and a Friends Provident Trophy final. He resigned as Kent captain following the 2012 English cricket season and James Tredwell became club captain. Key only had one season off as captain as Tredwell then himself resigned and Key was named as his replacement, captaining the county for another two years until the end of the 2015 season.

In April 2016, Key announced his retirement from all forms of cricket. Key was a regular commentator on Sky Sports' TV coverage of county cricket while still a player at Kent, and after retiring he worked as a pundit and commentator for a variety of media outlets, including GTV and SEN. On 17 April 2022, he was appointed as the managing director of the England men's cricket team, stepping down from all of his media commitments.

== Early and personal life ==
Born in East Dulwich, London, to parents Trevor and Lynn, Key was raised in a particularly sporting family: his mother played for Kent's ladies cricket team, his father played club cricket in Derby and his sister Elizabeth played for her junior school team, where she once took a hat-trick. Key himself was a keen all-round sportsman; he also played tennis for Kent.

He attended Worsley Bridge Primary School where the school won both the Bromley area and Kent cricket Cups. His performances led to his inclusion in the county under-elevens, before Alan Ealham, coach of Kent County Cricket Club's youth teams, became his mentor. Later he attended Colfe's School in Lee, London, and Langley Park School for Boys in Beckenham, where he passed ten GCSEs.

Key has often been criticised for his weight, and at one stage early in his career weighed 16 stone before Alec Stewart told him to "buck his ideas up". Key himself said of the matter: "I'll never be the most athletic-looking bloke, but I'm a hell of a lot fitter than I was at 19 or 20."

Key is married to Fleur, with whom he has two children.

== Youth and early career ==
Key played his first matches for Kent's second eleven in 1995, at the age of sixteen. He remained a regular in the second team throughout the 1996 season and first half of the 1997 season, by which time he had hit his first two centuries for a Kent representative team; an unbeaten 146 against Essex's second team, and an unbeaten 139 against Glamorgan's seconds.

Following on from those performances, Key joined the England Under-17 squad for the International Youth Tournament, which was being held in Bermuda. Key's growing reputation as a batsman was greatly enhanced by his performances in this tournament, where he finished with the second highest batting average of anyone at the tournament, scoring 184 runs at an average of 46. Key's performances helped England win the tournament by a single point from Ireland's Under-17s.

Key returned to England for two matches with Kent's second team, before joining up with England's Under-19s for a youth Test series against Zimbabwe's under-19s. In the three Test series, Key made two half-centuries, earning himself a place in the squad for the 1998 Under-19 Cricket World Cup in South Africa. Batting at the top of the order throughout, Key scored a total of 206 runs as England won the tournament, with his best performance coming in the defeat to India, where Key scored 57.

Following a first-class debut against Middlesex at the beginning of the 1998 season, in which Key scored 15, he proceeded to play a near-complete season. He scored his first first-class century against Durham, scoring 101 in an innings victory. He added a second century (115) against Nottinghamshire, before rejoining the England under-19 squad for the series against Pakistan under-19s. He struggled in the one-day series, scoring just 36 runs in three matches, but finished as the top run-scorer in the youth Tests; with 377 at an average of 62.83.

== Domestic career ==
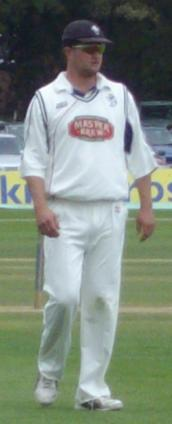
Key in the field during 2008

The 1999 season began for Key with a call up to England A's tour of Zimbabwe through January and February. He struggled for runs throughout his five matches on the tour, failing to pass 26 in any innings. In all, Key managed one century in the calendar year, 125 against Somerset, and finished the year with 1,309 runs in all competitions. The 2000 season proved even more disappointing, with just 700 runs at an average of less than 20.

The 2001 English cricket season saw Key's form improve, with him scoring four first-class centuries, including one against the touring Pakistanis. His highest score of the season and career to date would come in the final game—he scored 132 in a rain-affected match against Lancashire. His scoring throughout the season persuaded the national selectors to include him in the National Academy, which went on a winter tour of Australia, where he showed his ability with an innings of 177 against the team's Australian counterparts.

He continued his good form into 2002, where his run-scoring earned him an invitation to play for the Marylebone Cricket Club against the Sri Lankans. He scored 77 in a drawn match, and would later that season make his Test match debut against India. However, following his Test debut, he only passed 50 on one further occasion that year. He would maintain his place in the Test team against Zimbabwe the following year, despite only scoring one innings of note—129 against the Cambridge students. However, after being dropped from the team, Key's form seemed to improve: he scored 140 against Nottinghamshire to set up a Kent victory, and consistently scored around 40 runs per innings for the remainder of the season.

The 2004 English cricket season saw Key hit top form for the first time, scoring a total of 2,486 runs in all competitions. This total included a "majestic" unbeaten 118 in the opening game of the season against Gloucestershire, during which Key did not offer a single chance throughout. He reached the thousand run milestone for the season on 2 June, the earliest date the milestone had been reached since 1978, and went on a run that included five centuries in seven innings. He was then recalled to the England squad for the series against the West Indies, and Key played two key innings: 221 at Lord's, and his second innings 93 not out to win the third Test for England. Following the series Key returned to the domestic scene, and finished the season with two further tons：131 against both Northamptonshire and Middlesex.

Following the winter international series in South Africa, Key returned to domestic action with Kent. While not having as successful a season as in the previous year, he still scored over 1,500 runs. This included two centuries in the same match against Surrey, during the second of which he shared a county third-wicket record partnership of 323 with Martin van Jaarsveld. At the end of the season, Key was named the new county captain following the resignation of David Fulton, a role he took on in order to help his chances of regaining a place in the England team.

His first season as captain saw his form slide, as Kent's chairman of cricket Graham Johnson related at the end of the season: "His commitment to the team has probably impacted on his own form". Nonetheless, he was given the captaincy of the England A team in their fixture against Pakistan, and led Kent to fifth place in the top tier of the County Championship. The following season saw Key lead Kent to silverware, whilst returning to some of his best form. He struck a total of eight centuries, and amassed a total of 2,267 runs in all competitions, whilst also leading Kent to the finals day of the 2007 Twenty20 Cup, in which Kent defeated Sussex and Gloucestershire to claim the trophy. However, Key was later found guilty of "serious dissent" following his controversial dismissal in the final.

He continued his run-scoring into 2008, where he scored an unbeaten 178 against the touring New Zealanders to "lift himself firmly into the Test reckoning". Following Michael Vaughan's resignation as England captain, Key was touted by the some in the media as a potential candidate for the job. However, the season ended badly for Key, as under his captaincy Kent were relegated to the second tier of the County Championship for the first time, with Key also being fined £1,250 for comments he made over an ECB pitch panel decision in August.

Key took his first wicket in first-class cricket on the final day of Kent's draw with Northamptonshire at the start of the 2009 season. He went on to score 1,209 runs that season, with four centuries including a career-best 270*, at 50.37 runs per innings. It was the sixth time he had passed one thousand runs in a season. He came close to beating this score the following season when, on 17 May 2010, he scored 261 against Durham. He had, until that match, struggled with the bat—averaging only 14.30 in the County Championship.

He announced his retirement from the game on 18 April 2016, citing his desire to not "hinder younger players [coming through]" and focus on coaching and his role with Sky Sports as a television pundit.

== International career ==
=== India in England, 2002 ===
Key made his Test match debut in the second Test against India in 2002, as a replacement for Marcus Trescothick, who had broken his thumb. The chairman of selectors, David Graveney, said Key was selected because of his "outstanding form for Kent after attending the National Academy" over the winter. Opening the batting with Michael Vaughan, Key made 17 runs in his only innings before being bowled by Ashish Nehra. Retained in the team for the third Test, Key managed scores of 30 and 34 as England succumbed to an innings defeat. However, his performance was marred by his dropping three catches. Key was dropped from the fourth and final Test, with Trescothick replacing him, having been rushed back from injury.

=== England in Australia, 2002–03 ===
After success in domestic cricket and promise shown in his Test appearances previously, Key was selected as part of the squad to play Australia. Despite playing well in a limited overs match against an ACB Chairman's XI; hitting 68, he was not selected to play in the first Test, instead acting as twelfth man. He ended up fielding to a greater extent than he would have imagined, after Simon Jones ruptured knee ligaments while fielding, and took no further part in the match.

Brought back into the team for the second Test for the injured John Crawley, Key made a solitary run in the first innings, batting at number three, before being caught off the bowling of Shane Warne just after the lunch break. Relegated to number five in the second innings, with Mark Butcher and Nasser Hussain batting ahead of him, he again made just one before being caught off Andy Bichel.

Key fared better in the third match, played at the WACA Ground in Perth. On a pitch with "exceptional bounce and pace", Key was the only English batsman to keep his wicket intact for a prolonged period, batting passively for 47, the highest score of the innings. He then caught Brett Lee at third man in Australia's only innings, before offering Hussain "stout support" in making 23 second time around. England lost the Test match by an innings and 48 runs, a result that ensured that Australia retained the Ashes.

Following a break for the first part of the VB Series of One Day Internationals, England moved to Melbourne for the fourth Test. Unfortunately for Key, he fell for a duck in the first innings, trapped leg before wicket (lbw) second ball by fast bowler Brett Lee. With England following on, Key made a maiden half-century to ensure Australia had to bat again. He eventually fell just after the new ball was taken, caught at second slip for 52.

The final Test, played at the Sydney Cricket Ground, saw England attempting to avoid a series whitewash. Key scored three runs in England's first innings, before falling lbw to an innocuous half-volley from Steve Waugh, playing in his last Ashes Test. He scored 14 in his final innings of the tour, before being caught at midwicket, however England had nearly 350 runs on the board by that stage and were on track to complete a consolatory victory. The 2004 edition of the Wisden Cricketers' Almanack recorded that Key had "justified his selection ahead of an older player, like Mark Ramprakash, but did not cement his place".

=== Zimbabwe and South Africa in England, 2003 ===
Despite a low-scoring start to the 2003 English cricket season, in which he passed 40 only once in his first seven innings of the season, he kept his place in the Test team for the visit of the touring Zimbabweans. Batting at number five in both Tests, Key failed to make much of an impact, scoring 18 runs in the first match and four in the second. He had reason to feel aggrieved at his first Test dismissal—umpire Steve Bucknor gave him out caught behind, despite Key not hitting the ball.

His inclusion in the One Day International (ODI) squad for the following NatWest Series against Zimbabwe and South Africa owed more to the lack of available players than his own form; he had only passed 40 on one occasion going into the series. Key made his ODI debut against Zimbabwe in the opening match of the tournament; he scored 11 before falling to the left-arm spin of Ray Price. Key only played one more match in the series; against South Africa he fell for a golden duck taking a "wild swing" at the first ball he received from Makhaya Ntini. Following England's qualification into the final of the tournament, Key was released from the squad "to have some match-practice in the longer form of the game ahead of the Test series" against South Africa. However, Key did not make an appearance in the series.

=== West Indies in England, 2004 ===
Key returned to the Test match team after an excellent start to the 2004 season. He reached 1,000 runs for the season by 2 June, the earliest date the milestone had been reached for 16 years, and had a run of five centuries in seven innings. However, his limited-overs form was not as good—he passed fifty only once all season. Despite this, he was called into the squad for the NatWest Series against the West Indies and New Zealand.

Key's series began with the fifth match of the tournament; against the West Indies at Headingley. With England chasing 160 to win, Key came in at 55 for one, but scored just six before being bowled by Dwayne Bravo. His only other appearance came against New Zealand towards the end of the group stage—Key scored 18 and was playing well before being caught behind.

His place in the Test team was ensured after Mark Butcher pulled out, having been hit from behind in his car and sustaining a whiplash injury. Key took the opportunity, moving toward a maiden Test century with what Wisden described as "powerful driving and pulling". He was dropped twice—Chris Gayle parried an opportunity with Key on 16, while Devon Smith failed to dismiss him when on 58. Key maintained his concentration throughout, even after meeting the Queen in a presentation during the tea interval. He brought up his century with a boundary off the bowling of Fidel Edwards, and by the end of the first day had reached 167 not out. He continued positively on the second day, and brought up his maiden double century with four through square leg off Pedro Collins. He was eventually dismissed when he "slashed a wide ball to Brian Lara at backward point", having made 221. In the second innings, he was run out by his captain Michael Vaughan, who went on to score his second century of the match.

The second Test saw Key struggling in the corridor of uncertainty, a characteristic highlighted by Collins, who beat the bat on several occasions before finding the edge to dismiss him. His second innings lasted just seven balls before Key "chipped a simple catch to mid-on", having scored just four.

Key's most valuable innings, according to Wisden, came in the third Test. Despite only scoring six runs in the first innings, Key came to the crease for his second innings with England requiring another 216 runs to take a 3–0 lead in the series. Initially batting with Michael Vaughan, and then with Andrew Flintoff, Key scored an unbeaten 93 to guide England to their target, which was a record fourth innings total to win an Old Trafford Test. His series came to an end when he scored ten runs, in England's ten-wicket victory in the final Test.

Key's performances in the series and his domestic form earned him recognition—he was named as one of the five Wisden Cricketers of the Year in the 2005 edition.

=== England in South Africa, 2004–05 ===
Following on from his performances during the series against the West Indies, Key was taken on England's tour of South Africa over the English close-season. However, with Mark Butcher returning to the team following injury, Key lost his place. This was despite him scoring 87 in a warm-up game against a Nicky Oppenheimer XI, a match in which Butcher had scored just six. Returning to the team for the third Test after Butcher had sustained a wrist injury, Key made a duck in the first innings, before "defending resolutely" in accumulating 41 before being stumped charging Nicky Boje.

The fourth Test, played at the Wanderers, saw Key hit 83, in a partnership of 182 with Andrew Strauss that Wisden described as including "hard-hitting support from Key". He added a further eighteen to his match tally in the second innings, a contribution which helped England to an eventual victory. Key returned single figure scores of one and nine in his two innings in the final Test, being dismissed by Shaun Pollock on both occasions in a rain-affected draw.

=== ICC World Twenty20 ===
Key briefly returned to international cricket for the 2009 ICC World Twenty20 competition, playing his only Twenty20 International match against the Netherlands during the tournament as a replacement for the injured Kevin Pietersen. He scored 10 not out from eight balls in a match where the Netherlands successfully chased their target from the final ball.

== Career records and statistics ==
=== Test matches ===
Records:

- Lord's Cricket Ground second wicket partnership record: 291 with Andrew Strauss, 2004 v West Indies
- Wanderers Stadium second wicket partnership record: 182 with Andrew Strauss, 2004–05 v South Africa

Test centuries:

Robert Key's Test Centuries
	Runs	Match	Against	City/Country	Venue	Year
[1]	221	9	West Indies	London, England	Lord's Cricket Ground	2004

Career performances:

Statistics correct as of 20 June 2008.		Batting				Bowling			
Opposition	Matches	Runs	Average	High Score	100 / 50	Runs	Wickets	Average	Best (Inns)
Australia	4	141	17.63	52	0 / 1	–	–	–	–
India	2	81	27.00	34	0 / 0	–	–	–	–
South Africa	3	153	25.50	83	0 / 1	–	–	–	–
West Indies	4	378	63.00	221	1 / 1	–	–	–	–
Zimbabwe	2	22	11.00	18	0 / 0	–	–	–	–

=== One Day Internationals ===
Career performances:

Statistics correct as of 20 June 2008.		Batting				Bowling			
Opposition	Matches	Runs	Average	High Score	100 / 50	Runs	Wickets	Average	Best (Inns)
New Zealand	1	18	18.00	18	0 / 0	–	–	–	–
South Africa	1	0	0.00	0	0 / 0	–	–	–	–
West Indies	2	25	12.50	19	0 / 0	–	–	–	–
Zimbabwe	1	11	11.00	11	0 / 0	–	–	–	–

=== Career Best Performances ===
	Batting				Bowling (innings)			
	Score	Fixture	Venue	Season	Figures	Fixture	Venue	Season
Test	221	England v West Indies	Lord's	2004	–			
ODI	19	England v West Indies	Lord's	2004	–			
T20I	10 not out	England v Netherlands	Lord's	2009	–			
First-class	270 not out	Kent v Glamorgan	Cardiff	2009	2/31	Kent v Somerset	Canterbury	2010
List A	144 not out	Kent v Netherlands	Tunbridge Wells	2013	–			
T20	98 not out	Kent v Sussex	Hove	2010	–			

== Director of England cricket team ==
On 17 April 2022, he was appointed as the managing director of the England men's cricket team, stepping down from all of his media commitments. He appointed Brendon McCullum as the coach of the Test Team, who instigated a more attacking form of play coined by the media as "Bazball".

Brendon McCullum was sacked by the ECB 12 July 2026. This followed the resignation of the English Captain on the penultimate day of the last England New Zealand test 28 June 2026

Sporting positions
Preceded by David Fulton; James Tredwell	Kent County Cricket Club captain 2006–2012; 2014–15	Succeeded by James Tredwell (2013); Sam Northeast (2016)
