= Martin Bodenham =

English football referee and cricket umpire

- Full name: Martin John Dale Bodenham
- Born: 23 April 1950 (age 76); Brighton, Sussex, England
- Other occupation: Cricket umpire

Domestic
Years	League	Role
1978–1992	Football League	Referee
1992–1998	Premier League	Referee

Martin Bodenham
Umpiring information
- WODIs umpired: 5 (2006–2013)
- WT20Is umpired: 5 (2008–2011)

Martin John Dale Bodenham (born 23 April 1950) is a former English football referee and cricket umpire who retired from the first-class cricket list in 2016. He was born in Brighton, but lived for a significant part of his life in Looe, Cornwall. He now resides in Ferring, in Sussex.

In 2008, Bodenham was named as a first class umpire by the England and Wales Cricket Board, for that year’s County cricket season. Officials said that, "he will make history as the first man to have officiated at top-flight football and umpire at first-class cricket in England and Wales." As a referee, his career highlights have included "the 1997 League Cup Final, and the replay match between Leicester City and Middlesbrough."

== Career ==
His first football referee experience is in Brighton 'parks' in 1966.

He progressed to top level refereeing in 1978.

In Europe, on 18 May 1994, he was the fourth official at the 1994 European Cup Final in Athens, AC Milan defeating Barcelona by 4–0.

His most prestigious appointment domestically was the League Cup Final at Wembley on 6 April 1997, when Leicester City drew 1–1 with Middlesbrough after extra time. A replay was necessary, during which Martin presided over Leicester's 1–0 victory at Hillsborough (also after extra time), the goal coming from Steve Claridge in the 100th minute.

He also refereed two FA Cup semi finals during his 32-year career, before his retirement in 1998. At this point, he entered the world of cricket, becoming a Sussex League umpire.

In 2001, he became the first ever Head of Refereeing for the county of Sussex. He is also a Premier League match observer, referees' assessor, and UEFA delegate.

Bodenham switched active sports completely in 2005, becoming a top-class cricket umpire, and was added to the ECB reserve list in 2006. He stood at the wicket for England A versus Sri Lanka at Worcester in May of that year.

== See also ==
- List of football referees
