= Martin van Jaarsveld =

South African cricketer

Personal information
- Full name: Martin van Jaarsveld
- Born: 18 June 1974 (age 52); Klerksdorp, Transvaal Province, South Africa
- Nickname: Jarre
- Height: 6 ft 2 in (1.88 m)
- Batting: Right-handed
- Bowling: Right-arm medium Right-arm off spin
- Role: Batsman

International information
- National side: South Africa (2002–2004)
- Test debut (cap 287): 18 October 2002 v Bangladesh
- Last Test: 26 December 2004 v England
- ODI debut (cap 71): 6 October 2002 v Bangladesh
- Last ODI: 18 September 2004 v West Indies

Domestic team information
- Years: Team
- 1994–2004: Northerns
- 2004: Northamptonshire
- 2004–2011: Titans
- 2005–2011: Kent (squad no. 41)
- 2012: Glamorgan

Career statistics
Competition	Tests	ODI	FC	LA
Matches	9	11	222	250
Runs scored	397	124	15,587	7,973
Batting average	30.53	20.66	45.97	40.88
100s/50s	0/3	0/0	48/75	14/48
Top score	73	45	262*	132*
Balls bowled	42	31	2,940	1,389
Wickets	0	2	42	30
Bowling average	–	9.00	36.09	40.93
5 wickets in innings	–	0	1	0
10 wickets in match	–	0	0	0
Best bowling	–	1/0	5/33	3/13
Catches/stumpings	11/–	4/–	328/–	144/–
- Source: ESPNcricinfo, 19 October 2009

Martin van Jaarsveld (born 18 June 1974) is a former South African cricketer who played nine Tests and eleven One Day Internationals for South Africa between 2002 and 2004. Van Jaarsveld is a specialist middle-order batsman, though he has two wickets in One Day International cricket, including England opening batsman Marcus Trescothick in a match where he bowled five overs for 18 runs, but did not get to bat because of a 153-run partnership between Jacques Kallis and Jacques Rudolph.

== International career ==
He got his international debut following his performances in the 2001–02 season, where he made 1,268 runs at a batting average of 74.58, beginning his international career with the home series against Bangladesh in 2002–03, though in a ten-wicket win at Benoni, he made no contribution with bat or ball. He top-scored in the next match, however, making 42, and also dismissed Talha Jubair with his first ball in international cricket to end the innings. In the two Tests, he made 50 runs in two innings, and was dismissed once, lbw to Tapash Baisya.

However, after scoring three runs against Sri Lanka in the first match of a two-Test series, he was left out as Herschelle Gibbs recovered from a back injury, and only returned for the 2003 NatWest Series. South Africa finished second at the three-team tournament, but van Jaarsveld only passed 20 once, ending with 82 runs at an average of 20.50, and he was left out of the squad to tour Pakistan in 2003–04. He played two Tests in that season, making a maiden Test half-century with 73 against West Indies after Gary Kirsten pulled out, and replacing Neil McKenzie for the final Test in New Zealand, making 59 and 13 not out in a nine-wicket win.

Van Jaarsveld also went on tour to Sri Lanka in 2004, but despite a first-innings 51 in the second Test, South Africa lost that match by 313 runs to lose the series. However, he was given one last chance in the One Day International team at the 2004 Champions Trophy, replacing Jean-Paul Duminy after a 0–5 ODI-series loss in Sri Lanka. After not batting against Bangladesh, van Jaarsveld made a golden duck in South Africa's second and last match, smashing a ball from Ian Bradshaw to Daren Powell in a five-wicket loss to the eventual champions West Indies. He played two more Tests, however – making 15 runs in two innings (out of the South Africans' total of 679) in a draw at Green Park Stadium, Kanpur before he was dropped for Hashim Amla. He came back for the second Test of five against England, but a first-innings 1 did not impress the selectors, though he did make 49 off 52 balls in the second innings as South Africa attempted a chase of 378 in 86 overs.

== Kolpak deal and international retirement ==
In 2005, van Jaarsveld retired from international cricket, choosing instead to become a Kolpak player in English county cricket for Kent. Van Jaarsveld claimed that he was making "a decision about what [was] best for [his] long-term future". He made the highest score for Kent in the 2005 season, with 262 not out against Glamorgan, but was third in the run-scoring tables with 1,198 runs, behind former England Test player Rob Key and 29-year-old Darren Stevens. He returned to South African domestic cricket for the 2005–06 season, playing for the Benoni Titans and making 211 runs in five SuperSport Series games at an average lower than five other Titans players.
