= Warren Lee (cricketer) =

English cricketer (born 1987)

Personal information
- Full name: Warren Wain Lee
- Born: 27 August 1987 (age 39); New Delhi, India
- Batting: Right-handed
- Bowling: Right-arm medium-fast
- Role: Bowler

Domestic team information
- Years: Team
- 2009: Kent
- 2012–2013: Unicorns
- LA debut: 26 April 2009 Kent v Somerset
- Last LA: 27 May 2013 Unicorns v Leicestershire

Career statistics
Competition	List A
Matches	13
Runs scored	25
Batting average	4.16
100s/50s	0/0
Top score	11
Balls bowled	445
Wickets	14
Bowling average	36.28
5 wickets in innings	0
10 wickets in match	0
Best bowling	3/39
Catches/stumpings	3/–
- Source: CricInfo, 30 January 2016

Warren Wain Lee (born 27 August 1987) is an English former professional cricketer who played List A cricket for Kent County Cricket Club and Unicorns. Lee was born in India at New Delhi and educated at Eaglesfield School and Shooters Hill Sixth Form College in Greenwich in south-east London.

A right arm medium-fast bowler, Lee played Second XI cricket for Kent from 2006 before making his List A cricket debut for Kent against Somerset in April 2009.

He played twice for Kent in 2009 before his contract was renewed at the end the season, but was released by the county part way through the 2010 season. He also made appearances for the Second XIs of Middlesex, Surrey and Worcestershire before playing for Unicorns in 11 List A matches in 2012 and 2013.

Lee has played for Blackheath and Bickley Park in the Kent Cricket League and has appeared for MCC in non-first-class matches.
