= Neil Bainton =

English cricket umpire

Personal information
- Full name: Neil Laurence Bainton
- Born: 2 October 1970 (age 56); Romford, London, England
- Role: Umpire

Umpiring information
- WODIs umpired: 8 (2004–2012)
- WT20Is umpired: 6 (2006–2018)
- FC umpired: 261 (2000–present)
- LA umpired: 182 (1999–present)
- T20 umpired: 251 (2005–present)
- Source: Cricinfo, 28 July 2024

Neil Laurence Bainton (born 2 October 1970) is an English cricket umpire. He was born in Romford, London in 1970.

Bainton was appointed to the list of full-time first-class umpires in late 2005, having officiated his first first-class match in 2000. He has also officiated in several women's and youth internationals. He sits on the board of the ECB Association of Cricket Officials.
