= Steve Garratt =

English cricket umpire

Steven Arthur Garratt (born 5 July 1953 in Nottingham) is an English cricket umpire.

Also a policeman, Garratt was appointed to the England and Wales Cricket Board's first-class umpires panel for the 2008 season, having spent the previous five seasons on the reserve list. He has also officiated in international women's cricket.
