= Surrey County Cricket Club in 2005 =

2005 season of an English cricket team

Surrey Lions
2005 season
- Captain: Mark Butcher
- Ground(s): The Oval; Guildford; Whitgift School

Surrey County Cricket Club, in 2005, played their cricket in the First Division of the County Championship and the Second Division of the totesport League. The 2004 season was a disappointment for Surrey under the captaincy of Jonathan Batty, who was replaced by Mark Butcher in 2005. However, Butcher was out for most of the season due to an injury to his left wrist, leaving Mark Ramprakash as interim captain – one of the few, maybe the only, man to captain both Surrey and their arch-rivals Middlesex.

Surrey is 10–3 second-favourites for the County Championship – and started their season with a damp draw against neighbours Sussex. In the totesport League, they lost their first game in a high-scoring match at the Oval against Yorkshire, which showed how long the Surrey tail is.

After these games, they then took on the students of Bradford/Leeds UCCE and to their surprise, and the students' credit, Surrey lost by 4 wickets. More concerning though were the injuries picked up by Martin Bicknell, Ian Salisbury and Rikki Clarke, which meant none of these three bowled in the final innings. It got no better for Surrey the following Sunday, when they lost heavily to Durham.

Surrey then went to Cardiff to play Glamorgan. The game was won by a combination of Jimmy Ormond, who made a career-best 7 for 63, and Mark Ramprakash who scored a century on the way to notching up his 25,000th first class run. They didn't play until the May Day Bank Holiday, when they were humbled away in Somerset.

On 4 May they were run hard by Staffordshire in the C&G Trophy, who at times threatened to repeat Ireland's humbling of Surrey in 2004, but ultimately the Lions prevailed. They then lost heavily to Nottinghamshire, who went to the top of the Division One table as a result, before beating Divisional whipping boys, Glamorgan convincingly at the Oval.

They were then whipped themselves in the Second Division of the National League, as Leicestershire County Cricket Club beat them by 60 runs. On 17 May they beat defending champions Gloucestershire in the Second Round of the C&G Trophy, and three days later won their first totesport League match of the year against Scotland. They then hung on for a draw in the Championship against Kent. It was during this match that it was announced that Surrey was to lose 8 points because of ball-tampering in the match against Nottinghamshire. This left them fifth in Division One at the end of May.

The first game in June was a 4-day draw with Warwickshire at Whitgift School, before losing by 49 runs to the same team on the same ground the next day. They then went on to Lord's where they took 12 points in a high-scoring draw against Middlesex, before defeating one of the favourites, Hampshire, by an innings and 55 runs. Surrey started their Twenty20 campaign with two victories, over Kent and Middlesex, and despite a loss against Hampshire they looked on course for more Twenty20 success. Indeed, they won their next three games, and despite two losses on the end of the campaign to Essex in a 5-over game and Sussex, they finished top of the South Division. In the County Championship, they squandered a 325-run first innings lead against Gloucestershire, failing to bowl them out in 157 overs of the second innings and having to settle with a draw, before getting only their second win of the National League season – a three-run squeeze against Yorkshire. However, they were knocked out of the C&G Trophy by Hampshire shortly afterwards, before enduring a big loss to Derbyshire in the National League. In the quarter-final of the Twenty20 Cup, shortened by rain, their game with Warwickshire was tied on the Duckworth–Lewis method so the captains agreed to have a bowl-off, which Surrey won 4–3, thus progressing to the semi-final.

Their Championship cricket was less impressive, as they lost sight of the leaders after a four-wicket defeat to Kent, where they conceded 232 in 35 overs to lose the match, and their one-day form was as woeful as usual, as they conceded 219 runs in 22 overs to Sussex in a shortened Sunday League game at Guildford, which they lost by 48 runs. A draw – their sixth of the Championship season – with Nottinghamshire followed, to leave them fourth in the table, twenty points adrift of the leaders Nottinghamshire. The Twenty20 Cup semi-finals and final was hosted at Surrey's home ground The Oval, but the home fans were disappointed in the team as Surrey went out in the semi-finals to Lancashire Lightning.

August began with a five-wicket Championship loss to Sussex, before winning two successive National League games, against Kent and Leicestershire. A virtual second XI, nevertheless including Mark Butcher and Saqlain Mushtaq, drew with Bangladesh A. The fourth day of their Championship match with Gloucestershire was rained off, meaning that Surrey had to endure their seventh draw of the season, and were still in the relegation zone. Even in one-day cricket, rain haunted them, as the National League clash with Kent was rained off, and they suffered their eighth Championship draw of the season against Hampshire, as relegation became an all the more imminent threat. Two matches in the National League followed before the end of August, which both ended in losses, to Somerset and Sussex.

September, however, began well for Surrey, as they recorded an eight-wicket League victory over Derbyshire. Their winning ways didn't last long, however, as they drew with Warwickshire in the Championship before losing in the National League, and on the second day of their "relegation play-off" with Middlesex Surrey were confined to relegation in the Championship, as they had conceded too many bonus points. Despite going on to win by an innings and 39 runs, and also recording a victory against Scottish Saltires in the National League, the season ended on a glum note for Surrey.

== Players ==
- Azhar Mahmood
- Harbhajan Singh
- Mohammad Akram
- Jonathan Batty
- James Benning
- Martin Bicknell
- Ali Brown
- Rikki Clarke
- Richard Clinton
- Jade Dernbach
- Nayan Doshi
- Andrew Hodd
- Danny Miller
- Tim Murtagh
- Scott Newman
- James Ormond
- Mark Ramprakash
- Neil Saker
- Ian Salisbury
- Phil Sampson
- Graham Thorpe

== Tables ==
=== Championship ===
2005 County Championship – Division One
Pos	Team	Pld	W	D	L	Pen	BP	Pts
1	Nottinghamshire	16	9	4	3	0	94	236
2	Hampshire	16	9	4	3	0.5	92	233.5
3	Sussex	16	7	6	3	0	102	224
4	Warwickshire	16	8	3	5	0.5	86	209.5
5	Kent	16	6	7	3	8.5	99	202.5
6	Middlesex	16	4	7	5	0.5	98	181.5
7	Surrey	16	4	9	3	8.5	97	180.5
8	Gloucestershire	16	1	5	10	2	72	104
9	Glamorgan	16	1	1	14	0	71	88.5

=== totesport League ===
2005 totesport League – Division Two
Pos	Team	Pld	W	L	NR	T	Pts
1	Sussex Sharks	18	13	4	1	0	54
2	Durham Dynamos	18	12	4	2	0	52
3	Warwickshire Bears	18	10	6	2	0	44
4	Leicestershire Foxes	18	10	7	1	0	42
5	Derbyshire Phantoms	18	9	7	1	1	40
6	Somerset Sabres	18	9	8	1	0	38
7	Surrey Lions	18	7	10	1	0	30
8	Kent Spitfires	18	6	10	2	0	28
9	Yorkshire Phoenix	18	5	13	0	0	20
10	Scottish Saltires	18	2	14	1	1	12

== Match details ==
=== Surrey v Sussex (13–16 April) ===
Surrey (12pts) drew with Sussex (9pts)

Sussex won the toss at the Oval and elected to bat. Mark Ramprakash captained Surrey as Mark Butcher has still not recovered from the injury that saw him miss England's winter tour. Only 49 overs could be bowled on the first day, as rain delayed the start till after lunch, and bad light brought an early conclusion. Cloud cover helped the bowlers, but Sussex, thanks to Michael Yardy's 44 not out, finished the day on 171 for 4. The second day saw 61 overs. Yardy, again under cloud-covered skies, progressed to 111, which will have gone a long way to helping him cement a regular first team place. Rikki Clarke, who took 4 for 91, appears a yard quicker than last season, and to have improved after his poor season last year. Sussex finished the second day on 370, and Surrey on 6 for 1.

Only 13.3 overs were possible on a rain-affected third day, as Surrey moved to 33 for 1, with a draw a virtual certainty. The day was enlivened by the sight of a fox on top of one of the famous gasholders. It presumably went onto the top when the gasholder was low, and was trapped as the level rose. On the fourth day, Surrey's stand-in captain Ramprakash made an impressive 152, as Surrey elected to prolong their first innings until they reached 402 for 5 declared, to claim maximum batting points. The game ended there as a draw. (Cricinfo scorecard)

=== Surrey v Yorkshire (17 April) ===
Jimmy Ormond comes in to bowl for Surrey.

Yorkshire (4pts) beat Surrey (0pts) by 43 runs

At the Oval, Yorkshire Phoenix won the toss and batted. Matthew Wood anchored the innings with 111 off 127 balls, Australian Ian Harvey plundered 69 from 48, and Harvey's compatriot Phil Jaques took 49 from 39. Yorkshire ended on 334 for 5, a record score for them in the Sunday League against Surrey Lions. In reply Surrey tried to knock off their target in sixes, with 9 coming in their innings. Ali Brown scored 5 of them as he plundered 86 off 46. But wickets fell, and Surrey's specialist bowlers were not renowned for their batting abilities. When Brown was out, Surrey were 261 for 6, and still leading on Duckworth-Lewis. However, with no recognised batsmen left, only a Yorkshire victory was likely. When Mohammad Akram was stumped off a no-ball, Surrey were 291 all out, 43 runs in arrears. The pick of the Yorkshire bowling was captain Craig White with 4 for 14 in 4 overs. (BBC scorecard)

=== Surrey v Bradford/Leeds UCCE (20–22 April) ===
Bradford/Leeds UCCE beat Surrey by 4 wickets

The first day at the Oval went according to the script. Surrey piled on 433 for 7 declared, with Richard Clinton scoring a century, and then Bradford/Leeds UCCE got to 31 for 2 by stumps. Rikki Clarke twisted his ankle, and would not bowl again in the match.

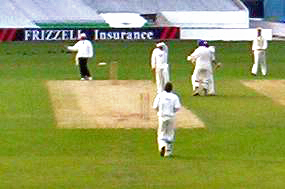
Bradford/Leeds UCCE celebrate as the winning runs are struck.

On the second day, the match changed. Bradford/Leeds UCCE, thanks to Adam Patel (54), James Duffy (64) and a defiant last wicket partnership of 86 between Tom Glover (42*) and Simon Crampton (42), took their score to 333, a deficit of 100. Even worse news for Surrey was a tear to Ian Salisbury's intercostal muscle which put him out of the rest of the game, and a re-aggravated hamstring injury to Martin Bicknell that stopped him bowling further in the match. Surrey then faltered with the bat, finishing the game on 132 for 6.

On the last day, Surrey were dismissed for 217 (although Ian Salisbury was absent hurt), with Glover taking 4 for 47. This left the students with a target of 318 runs off 70 overs. Very much to their credit, they went for it. Thomas Merilaht (56), Duffy (49 in 41 balls), Ryan Bradshaw (89* in 95 balls) and Mohammad Ali (27* off 22 balls) treated the sparse crowd to the sight of a UCCE team consistently finding the boundaries against a spread out field. Bradshaw hit 5 sixes and 8 fours in a match-winning innings. Whilst it was against a second-string Surrey attack (Clarke, Salisbury and Bicknell did not bowl) Bradford/Leeds UCCE were delighted to win with 2.1 overs remaining. (BBC scorecard)

=== Durham v Surrey (24 April) ===
Durham (4pts) beat Surrey (0pts) by 138 runs

Durham Dynamos continued their perfect start to the season with an emphatic win at Chester-le-Street. Surrey Lions chose to bowl first, and Tim Murtagh with 3 for 12 performed well. But Dale Benkenstein and Gordon Muchall put on 100 together to help the Dynamos to 224 for 8. For the Lions it all went wrong between the sixth and eighth overs, during which they lost four wickets for two runs to plummet to 27 for 4. Liam Plunkett and Benkenstein took 4 wickets each as Surrey were dismissed for 86 in 30.1 overs. It is early in the season, but already Surrey are looking weak after their fourth successive match without a victory. (Cricinfo scorecard)

=== Glamorgan v Surrey (27–30 April) ===
Surrey (18pts) beat Glamorgan (5pts) by five wickets

Glamorgan batted first at Cardiff, coming out finally at 2.30pm as rain delayed the start. Matthew Elliott was then dismissed first ball. It did get better for the Welsh side though, as Mark Wallace put on 86 from 107 and was still there at the close of play. Surrey probably had the best of the day, which ended with the Dragons on 238 for 9. However, it could have been a lot worse for Glamorgan, as David Hemp was dropped three times. Mohammad Akram got good rewards for his bowling, taking four wickets.

Glamorgan picked up 12 more runs to finish on 250. Then, on another rain affected day, Surrey moved to 162 for 4. The day's highlight was an innings by Mark Ramprakash, Surrey's stand-in captain, who became the second man still playing to pass 25,000 runs. He finished the day on 72 not out. The second day ended with Surrey on 162 for 4.

Ramprakash completed his century on the third day, but only Rikki Clarke (35) gave him any sort of support, and Surrey were bowled out for 248. Surrey had a two-run deficit to catch up with, but they did it, mainly thanks to Jimmy Ormond. Ormond swung his way to 7 for 63, helping Surrey on their way to victory. Ormond reduced Glamorgan to 15 for 2 by lunch and 87 for 7 in the 19th over. Glamorgan recovered, but only to 173, setting a target of 176. Surrey sped towards their target and were 122 for 4 off 26 overs at close, Ramprakash on 49.

It didn't take Surrey long on the final day to wrap up victory, and they only lost one wicket in the 10 overs it took. Ramprakash again was the mainstay of the innings and was not out for 68 when the winning runs came. (BBC scorecard)

=== Somerset v Surrey (2 May) ===
Somerset (4pts) beat Surrey (0pts) by 99 runs (D/L method)

Surrey Lions were never in this game, which was played at Taunton. The Sabres totalled a mammoth 325 for 6 in their 44 overs, with Sanath Jayasuriya (61 off 49), Marcus Trescothick (52 off 43) and Keith Parsons (85 off 75) doing most of the damage. The Lions were never in the hunt in reply. Whilst Ali Brown top-scored with a 37-ball 65, including seven fours and three sixes, wickets fell at regular intervals, and they finally finished on 226 for 9, 99 behind. (Cricinfo scorecard)

=== Staffordshire v Surrey (4 May) ===
Surrey beat Staffordshire by 3 wickets to progress to Round Two of the C&G Trophy

Last year, Surrey were knocked out in Round One of this Trophy by Ireland, and so they would have come to Leek determined to avoid the same ignominy this time round. Staffordshire did push them hard, however. Staffordshire batted first, and made 186, with 23 wides showing how inaccurate the Surrey bowling was. In reply, ex-Middlesex bowler, David Follett, took 3 for 13 to reduce Surrey to a worrying 47 for 4. Then Mark Ramprakash came in, who steadied the Surrey ship with 49, before he was run out, leaving Surrey 45 to win off 62 balls with 4 wickets left. Rikki Clarke and Martin Bicknell got most of them, as Surrey won with 192 for 7 with 7 balls to go, Bicknell winning the game with a six. (Cricinfo scorecard)

=== Surrey v Nottinghamshire (6–9 May) ===
Nottinghamshire (22pts) beat Surrey (3pts) by an innings and 71 runs

Nottinghamshire routed Surrey at the Brit Oval after Surrey self-destructed to Mark Ealham in the first innings. Surrey were looking for quick runs and got that, but didn't last fifty overs as Ealham took four of their men for 53 runs. James Benning was top-scorer with 56 runs off 43 balls, with nine fours and a six, and Surrey finished with 217 in 49.1 overs. By contrast, Darren Bicknell and Jason Gallian scored at a more sedate pace for Nottinghamshire, plodding along at 3.5 runs an over – but got the runs. An opening partnership of 178 gave Nottinghamshire the edge, and despite losing Anurag Singh for a duck, they were only trailing by thirteen runs at stumps.

New Zealand captain Stephen Fleming then had a blast for Nottinghamshire. With everything going wrong for Surrey, they just couldn't find any bite, conceded 26 runs off no-balls, and were penalised five runs for ball-tampering, while Fleming smashed 238 runs for his third double-century of his career. With partnerships of 150 runs or more with both Gallian and Australian David Hussey, all the Surrey bowlers were smashed, as Nottinghamshire eased their way to 580 for 4 at stumps on day 2 and eventually 692 for 7 declared. Despite Surrey batting with more composure in the second innings, surviving for 141 overs, the damage was done, and even a two-hour break for rain couldn't save them as they were bowled out for 404, Graeme Swann taking four for 94 with his off-spin while the former England batsman Mark Ramprakash scored his third century of the Championship season with a six-hour 107. (Cricinfo scorecard)

=== Surrey v Glamorgan (11–14 May) ===
Surrey (22pts) beat Glamorgan (6pts) by 276 runs

Glamorgan went down to another heavy defeat, this time to Surrey, who were themselves humbled by Nottinghamshire in their previous game. There was a short boundary towards the Harleyford Road, over which Scott Newman (117) and Ali Brown (122) hit plenty of runs to take Surrey to 441 for 7 on the first day. They lost their final three wickets on the second day for just 3 more runs. Glamorgan then failed to show the right application, being dismissed for 345 with Martin Bicknell taking 6 for 74. The last 3 Glamorgan partnerships added 154 runs, with No. 9 David Harrison top-scoring with 75 not out. Such was the high-scoring at the Oval that Surrey were 66 for no loss at stumps on the second day.

On the third day, Newman (219) became the first man to make both a century and a double century in a game for Surrey as they finally declared on 425 for 4, leaving a theoretical target of 525. Bicknell then took his 1,000th wicket for Surrey as Glamorgan battled to 177 for 2 at close, with David Hemp and Mike Powell on 77 and 80 not out respectively. The game was over before lunch on the fourth day, with Rikki Clarke and Mohammad Akram got reverse swing to take 3 and 4 wickets respectively, as Glamorgan were reduced to 248 all out. Their last 7 wickets fell for 28 runs. (Cricinfo scorecard)

=== Leicestershire v Surrey (15 May) ===
Leicestershire (4pts) beat Surrey (0pts) by 60 runs

Surrey Lions continued their miserable form in the Sunday League, as they went down to their fourth defeat in four matches to be at the very bottom of the National League table. Leicestershire Foxes batted first, making 194 for 9, as almost all of their batsmen scored below their batting average, apart from Dinesh Mongia, who made 67. Mongia followed this up with 4 for 15 with the ball, dismissing Surrey for 134, after Scott Newman and Mark Ramprakash had taken them to 55 for 1. A total of 10 maiden overs were bowled in the Surrey innings. (Cricinfo scorecard)

=== Gloucestershire v Surrey (17 May) ===
Surrey beat Gloucestershire by three wickets to progress to the Quarter-Finals of the C & G Trophy

Surrey overcame their poor one-day form, with four losses in four National League games, to reach the quarter-finals in a close game at Bristol against Gloucestershire. Surrey won the toss and fielded first, restricting Gloucestershire to 230 for 8 after most of the Surrey bowlers got wickets. Chris Taylor made 74 and top-scored, but it was the all-rounder Alex Gidman who managed to keep his head calm, scoring 58 not out while the tail crashed to single figure scores around him. In reply, Surrey struggled to 110 for 4, losing wickets at key moments, but Rikki Clarke (62 not out) stood tall towards the end, taking the winning runs off James Averis with three balls and three wickets remaining in the innings. (Cricinfo scorecard)

=== Scotland v Surrey (20 May) ===
Surrey (4pts) beat Scotland (0pts) by 5 wickets

Scottish Saltires batted first at The Grange in Edinburgh. Jonathan Beukes, their South African import put on 91 from 86 balls as Scotland scored 252 for 7, their highest score of their National League season. Surrey had lost all 4 one-day league games before this match, and when they were reduced to 90 for 3, another defeat seemed on the cards. However, Graham Thorpe took 69 from 89 balls and Ali Brown 65 from 45 to give Surrey their first points with 6.3 overs to spare. (Cricinfo scorecard)

=== Kent v Surrey (25–28 May) ===
Surrey (10pts) drew with Kent (9pts)

Kent had to settle for a draw in a see-sawing match against Surrey at Tunbridge Wells, looking to control the game with skipper David Fulton and former England Test player Rob Key in. However, Martin Bicknell sparked a mini-collapse, removing four wickets in a short space of time to give Surrey a chance and finishing with four for 31 from 24 overs. However, after going from 112 for 0 to 129 for 5, Key and Andrew Hall built a partnership of 100 for the sixth wicket to save Kent's blushes. The Kent innings was finished off by slow left-armer Nayan Doshi who took three for 58 as Kent crumbled to 262 all out.

Min Patel then took timely wickets to reduce Surrey to 67 for 3, but Rikki Clarke and Jonathan Batty rescued Surrey with a fourth-wicket partnership of 99. Ali Brown then continued the good work with 56, allowing Clarke to reach his century and give Surrey the lead. However, Patel continued to chip away and ended with six for 124 off 38 overs, and Surrey were bowled out for 324, leading by 62 in what shaped up to be a close match. Before stumps, Kent lost the wicket of David Fulton for 18, but still made 37 for 1. With Key and Martin van Jaarsveld finally playing up to their potential, Key scoring 189 and van Jaarsveld 168, the Surrey bowlers were shown to be rather inadequate as Kent racked up 467 for 4 declared to set Surrey a massive 406 to win in a day.

They never really tried, opting to defend and take the four points available for a draw instead, as their run rate was about one and a half an over before lunch. Despite that, they got to 280 for 0, before the dominant batsman of Surrey's innings – Scott Newman, who made 167 with 16 fours and three sixes – was out to Martin Saggers, who bowled only eight overs. Despite a minor collapse, losing four wickets for 56 runs, Surrey hung on for the draw – as both teams lost further ground to Nottinghamshire, Hampshire and Warwickshire. During this match it was announced that Surrey would lose 8 points for ball-tampering in their game against Nottinghamshire. (BBC scorecard)

=== Surrey v Durham (30 May) ===
Surrey (4pts) beat Durham (0pts) by 43 runs

Durham fell to their first defeat of their totesport League campaign at the Oval as Surrey's youngsters rescued them from what could have been yet another Surrey batting collapse – they had lost 9 or 10 wickets in 4 of their 5 League matches so far, and had made 2 scores below 140. The hosts batted first, and their position looked dire as they were soon on 26 for 4, with Liam Plunkett and Neil Killeen taking two wickets each. James Benning, with 66 off 84 balls, and Rikki Clarke, with 54 off 67 balls, then put on 129, a record for Surrey against Durham. In the 38 overs the weather allowed, Surrey made 219. Tim Murtagh then took 3 wickets without conceding a run in his first 3 overs to knock Durham back. Whilst they threatened for a while thanks to a 95-run partnership between Nicky Peng and Dale Benkenstein, they never fully recovered and were finally all out for 176. (Cricinfo scorecard)

=== Surrey v Warwickshire (1–4 June) ===
Surrey (10pts) drew with Warwickshire (8pts)

Surrey had the better of the first three days at Whitgift School, which is located in Croydon and is now in its fifth year as a festival venue. Richard Clinton and Jonathan Batty both made 84 to bring up a first innings total of 340 for the hosts, and Mohammad Akram then took 5 for 51 as the defending champions were all out for 209 on the second day, and Scott Newman survived five overs with Clinton, adding 14 runs. Surrey declared on 310 for 7, which gave them just over a day to bowl out Warwickshire. Despite fine bowling from Harbhajan Singh, who was making his Surrey debut, the Warwickshire batsmen held up well with Michael Powell and Alex Loudon putting on an unbeaten partnership of 131 to see them safe on 222 for 3 at close. (Cricinfo scorecard)

=== Surrey v Warwickshire (5 June) ===
Warwickshire (4pts) beat Surrey (0pts) by 49 runs

At Whitgift School, Warwickshire Bears recorded a massive 309 for 8 in 45 overs to bat Surrey Lions out of the game. Neil Carter opened the innings with a typical 58 off only 36 balls, smashing four sixes and five fours in the process, while James Troughton scored 69. Only medium-pacer Neil Saker, playing in his seventh List-A game, avoided the routing as he was hit for 17 off five overs, taking the wicket of Jonathan Trott for 9. In reply, Mark Ramprakash and Ali Brown looked to take Surrey to the target, but when Brown departed for 52 off 34 balls, the air went out of Surrey's balloon. Ramprakash scored 89 not out, and became Surrey's top scorer, but Surrey finished all out for 260 with 22 balls remaining in their innings as Carter took three for 37 while Heath Streak and Dougie Brown snared two wickets each. (Cricinfo scorecard)

=== Middlesex v Surrey (8–11 June) ===
Middlesex (12pts) drew with Surrey (12pts)

Surrey edged the first day against Middlesex at Lord's. Initially Surrey reduced their hosts to 148 for 5, but then Jason Dalrymple rescued the innings with 77, supported by Irfan Pathan and Ben Scott. The first day ended with them on 319 for 7. They improved that greatly to 437 on the second day, as Pathan and Scott both made scores in the 60s. Surrey started slowly, moving to 18 for 1 after 15 overs of quality bowling from Pathan and Alan Richardson, but the stranglehold was eased with Richard Clinton scoring freely as he made his way to 73. At close, which came 18 overs early because of bad light, Surrey were 157 for 2, with Mark Ramprakash having retired hurt. Bad light claimed the last 29 overs of the third day too, but an unbeaten 152 from Ali Brown and a Surrey debut score of 81 from New South Wales recruit Dominic Thornely saw Surrey through to 460. The fourth day was always likely to meander into a draw, and exactly that happened; Surrey were simply unable to take wickets quick enough as the hosts were content to bat to 353 for 6 declared. (Cricinfo scorecard)

=== Hampshire v Surrey (15–17 June) ===
Surrey (21pts) beat Hampshire (3pts) by an innings and 55 runs

A great team effort, despite Martin Bicknell being out of form, resulted in Surrey winning their third game of the season and sharing third place in the table with Hampshire. A healthy opening partnership between Scott Newman and Richard Clinton worth 100 was to be the highest of the entire match, and despite Chris Tremlett taking wickets regularly, he also conceded a lot of runs, as he ended with four for 106 off twenty overs. Newman eventually finished with 111 and Australian David Thornely made 73 to see Surrey to a final score of 361 – in just 81.4 overs. The first two days at The Rose Bowl were hampered by rain, but amid the showers, Indian bowler Harbhajan Singh took six for 36 as Hampshire crumbled in a rather unimpressive heap for 146. Only two batsmen passed 20, and seven were out in single figures. Hampshire's second innings began with the first ball of the third day, and Jason Ormond ripped out two wickets quickly, Mohammad Akram got a five-for, and only John Crawley's 67 – off 62 balls with thirteen boundaries, slightly out of place in the situation – passed 25. Thus, the two teams were tied on 100 points in the Championship, allowing Warwickshire and Kent to run away further on the table. (Cricinfo scorecard)

=== Kent v Surrey (22 June) ===
Surrey (2pts) beat Kent (0pts) by seven wickets

In front of a full house at Beckenham, Mohammad Akram of the visiting Surrey Lions served up a rare maiden in Twenty20 cricket as Kent Spitfires were tied down to 140 for 8 off their twenty overs, despite Martin van Jaarsveld scoring a fifty. James Benning then made batting easy for Surrey, scoring ten fours and two sixes in a crackling 66. Surrey eventually won comparatively easily, having four overs left when they reached 141 for 3. (Cricinfo scorecard)

=== Surrey v Middlesex (23 June) ===
Surrey (2pts) beat Middlesex (0pts) by 23 runs

Surrey Lions recorded their second win from two matches in Twenty20 Cup cricket this season, ironic given their position at the very bottom of the 45-over National League. Ali Brown made 64 and David Thornely 67 not out as Middlesex Crusaders conceded too many runs at the fine batting track at Lord's, Surrey making 200 for 3. Owais Shah notched up his second score in the 70s in two days, taking 78 from 44 balls, and things looked good despite Shah leaving at 148 for 2. But Tim Murtagh changed all that. In four overs, he took six for 24, and with the help of David Thornely (three for 22) he ensured that Middlesex had seven batsmen out in single figures. They were bowled out for 177, with three balls remaining in the innings. (Cricinfo scorecard)

=== Surrey v Hampshire (25 June) ===
Hampshire (2pts) beat Surrey (0pts) by three wickets

James Bruce and Richard Logan, Hampshire Hawks' new-ball bowlers, reduced Surrey Lions to pieces at the Oval. Only Rikki Clarke passed 12 runs for Surrey, and he did so in style, making 52 with six fours and a six, while Logan and Bruce shared seven wickets between them. Hampshire had reason to be happy with bowling Surrey out for 118, although they did concede 17 wides, as extras were the second highest scorer for Surrey. Hampshire then attempted to collapse of their own, crashing to 6 for 2 and 66 for 7, but 34 from off-spinner and captain Shaun Udal saw them home without any further loss of wickets. (Cricinfo scorecard)

=== Surrey v Middlesex (28 June) ===
Surrey (2pts) beat Middlesex (0pts) by 22 runs (D/L method)

Rikki Clarke top-scored with 46 and top-bowled with three for 11 for the Surrey Lions as they moved closer to a quarter-final spot in the Twenty20 Cup with a Duckworth–Lewis method win over Middlesex Crusaders. Batting first, Surrey made 180 for 7, Tim Murtagh hitting 24 off the last eight balls as Melvyn Betts of Middlesex was smashed around. In reply, only Ed Smith could do anything serious against the Surrey bowlers, with 33 off 22 balls. When Clarke dug out him, Scott Styris and Ed Joyce in quick succession, however, things looked bright for Surrey, and then rain intervened after 11 overs of the Middlesex innings. They were never allowed to come back, and as they were 22 runs behind the par score with their 78 for 4, Surrey took the victory. (Cricinfo scorecard)

=== Sussex v Surrey (29 June) ===
Surrey (2pts) beat Sussex (0pts) by 5 wickets (D/L method)

A close, rain-damaged match at County Cricket Ground, Hove eventually ended in Surrey Lions snaring a last-ball victory over Sussex Sharks. Batting first, the hosts made 139 for 6 in 17 overs, spinner Nayan Doshi taking three wickets despite being the most expensive of the bowlers, while Matt Prior top-scored with 51. A 28-ball fifty from Ali Brown then lifted Surrey to 74 for 1, but two run outs saw them lose their next four wickets for eight runs. Azhar Mahmood and Ian Salisbury, however, shared a 36-run partnership and saw them pass the revised target of 114 by two runs on the very last ball of the game. (Cricinfo scorecard)

=== Surrey v Kent (1 July) ===
Surrey (2pts) beat Kent (0pts) by 23 runs (D/L method)

Kent Spitfires suffered another loss, this time at the Oval against Surrey Lions. In a rain-hit game shortened by five overs, Surrey scored freely, hitting at nearly 11 runs an over – Ali Brown with 29 and Scott Newman with 52 not out off 27 balls doing the brunt of the damage. Kent made an attempt at chasing 168, with Michael Carberry taking 23 runs off nine balls in his innings from number three, but Surrey spinner Nayan Doshi took four wickets for 27 to set them back to 123 for 6. With economical bowling from Azhar Mahmood as well, Kent only managed 144 for 8. (Cricinfo scorecard)

=== Essex v Surrey (5 July) ===
Essex (2pts) beat Surrey (0pts) by one run

Rain ravaged County Cricket Ground, Chelmsford and delayed the match between Essex Eagles and Surrey Lions to after ten o'clock. When it finally began, it had been shortened to five overs a side, and Essex made good use of it as they scored 71 for 3 – Ronnie Irani making 32, while Azhar Mahmood took two for three for Surrey. In reply, Antonio Palladino took two wickets for Essex, but it looked up for grabs when Surrey needed eight off five after James Middlebrook bowled a wide that went for four – however, he only conceded six runs from the remaining balls of the game, and Surrey finished on 70 for 2. Yet, they would have to be exceedingly unlucky in their last game to be eliminated, while Essex jumped into the top three and looked to qualify along with them. (Cricinfo scorecard)

=== Surrey v Sussex (6 July) ===
Sussex (2pts) beat Surrey (0pts) by three wickets

Surrey Lions were consistently pegged back by the Sussex Sharks' bowling at The Oval, having been put in to bat by Sussex captain Chris Adams. Azhar Mahmood stood firm and knocked off 40 unbeaten runs, but Naved-ul-Hasan, James Kirtley and Mushtaq Ahmed all got two wickets for less than six runs an over as Surrey eventually had to settle for 144 for 8. In reply, Ian Ward made a quickfire 50, off 28 balls, before being bowled by Surrey off-spinner Nayan Doshi to send Sussex to 82 for 3. Adams and Murray Goodwin both made 28, while Azhar Mahmood took two for 21 from four overs. Eventually, a six from Naved-ul-Hasan won Sussex the game with three balls to spare to put them third in the table, but as they were the poorest third-placed side in the competition with only three wins, they were still knocked out. (Cricinfo scorecard)

=== Gloucestershire v Surrey (8–11 July) ===
Gloucestershire (8pts) drew with Surrey (12pts)

At tea on day 2, it seemed inconceivable that, barring rain, this game would go to a draw, but Surrey failed to turn the screw and were denied victory by Alex Gidman and Steve Adshead. Surrey won the toss and opted to bat, and after Scott Newman and Richard Clinton had added 136 for the first wicket, things looked promising for the visitors to Bristol. With seven fifties – numbers 7, 8 and 9 Azhar Mahmood, Martin Bicknell and Harbhajan Singh all adding more than 75 runs – but no century, Surrey amassed 603 before being bowled out at lunch, none of the four bowlers conceding less than 100 runs. This was also the highest total without a century in England, breaking a 106-year-old record by Nottinghamshire, and the second highest total without a century in first-class cricket.

Then, a burst of three wickets from Rikki Clarke sent Gloucestershire to the ropes at 83 for 5. Alex Gidman, Mark Hardinges and Ian Fisher lifted the first-innings total to 288, still trailing by 325, but Gidman and wicket-keeper Adshead had more tricks saved for the second innings. Gloucestershire batted a marathon 157.2 overs against the Surrey spin-bowling – Harbhajan bowling 49 of those one ball of which went on as legba Six for the first time in cricket history – Gidman made a six-hour 142, Adshead pairing up with him for a little over four of those hours to add 93, and the second-innings total read 494. Surrey were eventually set a target of 180 to win in eleven overs. and not even Twenty20 style hitting from Azhar Mahmood, who hit three fours and one six in his 26 could send them to that, as they finished with 84 for 3. (Cricinfo scorecard)

=== Yorkshire v Surrey (13 July) ===
Surrey (4pts) beat Yorkshire (0pts) by three runs

Yorkshire Phoenix failed to convert a good position against Surrey Lions, who moved off last place in the table with a win. Having initially been placed in the field by Surrey's captain Mark Ramprakash, they conceded 111 for the first wicket, James Benning and Jonathan Batty making 72 and 41 respectively. A burst of three wickets from Richard Dawson's off-spin sent Surrey struggling at 127 for 4, but Ramprakash paired up with Rikki Clarke to recover, and Clarke then unleashed a late cameo off Ian Harvey to end with 90 not out off 71 balls to see Surrey to a final total of 264 for 7. In reply, Yorkshire looked confident at 222 for 2, recovering from the early shock of losing Matthew Wood for a golden duck. However, a couple of run-outs and a wicket from Tim Murtagh saw Tim Bresnan face the last ball with Yorkshire needing four to win – he was bowled by Nayan Doshi, and Surrey won by three runs, despite conceding 15 wides. (Cricinfo scorecard)

=== Surrey v Hampshire (15 July) ===
Hampshire beat Surrey by two wickets to progress to the Semi-Finals of the C&G Trophy

Despite an unbeaten 158 from Jonathan Batty, Surrey still lost their quarter-final game at The Oval, having first batted to make 358 for 6 in 50 overs. James Benning with 73, and Graham Thorpe with 60, also contributed, as Hampshire used seven bowlers who all failed to keep their conceded runs below six an over. In reply, Azhar Mahmood served up a wicket maiden over in the first over of Hampshire's innings, leaving Hampshire 359 to win with nine wickets in hand, but Shane Watson and Craig McMillan put the visitors from the south back on track with a partnership of 81 for the fourth wicket. When McMillan was run out, Hampshire were 200 for 4, but Watson powered on to make 132, his highest career List A cricket score to boost Hampshire to 342 for 8 when Tim Murtagh broke through his defences. By then, it was too late, as Shaun Udal completed his 44 not out, having added 63 with Watson for the eighth wicket earlier, and Hampshire made it to the target with thirteen balls to spare – although they had been given eleven extra balls due to no-balls and wides. (Cricinfo scorecard)

=== Surrey v Derbyshire (17 July) ===
Derbyshire (4pts) beat Surrey (0pts) by five wickets

Surrey Lions' dismal one-day season continued. Despite innings between 39 and 46 from the men batting from one to four, and a quickfire 29 from spinner Nayan Doshi which led to a defendable total of 260 for 8, the track at The Oval still yielded many runs, and Steve Stubbings and Michael Di Venuto slashed boundaries at will – a total of 27 were noted, including two sixes from Stubbings, and the boundaries were worth 112 of the pair's 196 runs. To add to that, Surrey bowled 24 extras, so their partnership had yielded 217 runs before Mohammad Akram broke through their defences – as both were dismissed two runs short of a century. The damage was done, however, and Derbyshire Phantoms ended on 264 for 5 with nearly six overs remaining. (Cricinfo scorecard)

=== Surrey v Warwickshire (18 July) ===
Match tied (D/L Method); Surrey won 4–3 in a bowl-out and progress to the Semi-Finals of the Twenty20 Cup

In an incredible finish to the knock-out quarter-final between Surrey Lions and Warwickshire Bears, the match was tied, so the players had to resort to a bowl-off – cricket's version of a penalty shootout, in which five players have two attempts at bowling at unguarded stumps, and if the stumps fall down, that was one point for their team. Surrey opened the batting in this match at The Oval, having been put in to bat by the Bears' captain Nick Knight. It was a shaky effort, often interrupted by wickets, and part-timer Jonathan Trott snared two wickets for 19 – admittedly tail-enders Ian Salisbury and Tim Murtagh. Mark Ramprakash, however, hit an unbeaten run-a-ball 34 to guide Surrey to 149 for 8, well below a par score. Warwickshire's innings then began under heavy cloud cover that assisted the Surrey swing bowlers. After Neil Carter went first ball, Warwickshire struggled in the rain, and the bad weather eventually stopped play just before five overs was played – so that, if the players couldn't return, the match would be declared a no-result. However, the rain gave way reasonably quickly, and quick hitting from Trevor Penney in particular – who made 20 off 12 balls before being caught off a ball from Rikki Clarke closed down the deficit.

With five overs being cut off the Warwickshire chase, they needed 118 from 15 overs, and they had got to 115 for 8 with one ball remaining and Dewald Pretorius and an injured Heath Streak, who had not bowled, at the crease. The umpires consulted, and were uncertain about what would happen if Warwickshire scored two – which, in the event, happened. As the par scores under Duckworth-Lewis were level, the captains agreed to have a bowl-off (alternatively the umpires could have forced a bowl-off or decided the game on a toss of the coin). After five players had tried to get the stumps down, both teams had managed the feat twice, and now a sudden death style bowl-off followed. The next player from each side managed to get the stumps down once each, so the score was now 3–3, but Warwickshire's Heath Streak missed both his attempts and Tim Murtagh got the stumps down and won the match for the hosts by 4–3. (Cricinfo scorecard)

=== Surrey v Kent (20–23 July) ===
Kent (21pts) beat Surrey (7.5pts) by four wickets

At Guildford, Surrey opted to bat first against the league-leaders Kent, and despite losing Richard Clinton for a ten-ball duck early on, the first day belonged to Surrey. Three batsmen passed 90 – Graham Thorpe, Mark Ramprakash and Ali Brown, who top-scored with 107 having been 101 not out overnight – as Surrey eased their way to 452 for 8 declared, never really bothered by any of the Kent bowlers. Kent were not daunted by Surrey's high score, however, not even when Rob Key and Darren Stevens departed in quick succession to see Kent to 202 for 4, but Matthew Walker and Justin Kemp added 233 for the fifth wicket, both making centuries. Kemp was eventually bowled by Azhar Mahmood for 124, but Walker went on to make 173 as Kent racked up 572, a lead of 120.

In reply, Richard Clinton and Jonathan Batty put on 107 for the first wicket, as the match headed towards a draw. However, patient work from spinner Min Patel, who was asked to bowl 47 overs, yielded four wickets (all of whom batted from number six and down) for 110 runs, and Patel was supported by two wickets by Andrew Hall to limit Kent's target to 231. After a frantic 34 overs, during which Mohammad Akram no-balled four times in his six overs while taking two for 30, Justin Kemp showed his skill at hitting quick runs as he made 47 not out, with three sixes, off 37 balls. In the end, Kent won with five balls remaining before the umpire would call time, and Surrey were also deducted half a point for a slow over rate. (Cricinfo scorecard)

=== Surrey v Sussex (24 July) ===
Sussex (4pts) beat Surrey (0pts) by 48 runs

A match at Guildford was shortened to 22 overs a side due to rain. However, the scores were similar to what could have been in a 45-over game, as Sussex Sharks amassed 219 for 9 – Murray Goodwin top-scoring with 44, while Luke Wright plundered three sixes in a 14-ball 35. The Surrey bowlers all got wickets – except for Ian Salisbury – but also conceded more than seven runs an over. A Surrey Lions side including three debutants – Stewart Walters, Rory Hamilton-Brown and Jake Dernbach – crumbled despite the efforts of Mark Ramprakash who made 63, as they were all out for 171. (Cricinfo scorecard)

=== Nottinghamshire v Surrey (26–29 July) ===
Nottinghamshire (8pts) drew with Surrey (7pts)

Surrey batted first at Trent Bridge, after Mark Ramprakash had won the toss, but despite Ramprakash making 42 the Nottinghamshire bowlers were completely in control. Andrew Harris took three for 55, Greg Smith removed three wickets in quick succession as Surrey fell from 53 for 1 to 57 for 4, and Surrey were bowled out for 136 with only four batsmen making their way into double figures. Nottinghamshire's reply lasted 66 overs, after eight wickets had fallen in 53 overs on the first day to take the first day wicket tally to 18, and Martin Bicknell got six for 56 with his swing bowling, his best return of the season. However, Nottinghamshire could thank Mark Ealham who negotiated the difficult conditions well to make 55 as Nottinghamshire earned a 90-run lead.

Surrey lost wickets regularly in the reply on day two, Scott Newman resisting with 40, but by stumps on day two they were 93 for 3 – rain having limited the day's play to 40 overs, yet a result looked very probable. However, day three was rained off, and an unbeaten century from Rikki Clarke sent Surrey into a good position at 292 for 6, where they declared to leave Nottinghamshire 203 runs from 40 overs. Nottinghamshire made a good attempt at chasing it, but lost five wickets quickly for 90 runs to Azhar Mahmood and Mohammad Akram. David Alleyne and Mark Ealham dug in before two quick wickets fell, but Ryan Sidebottom shut up shop with Smith to hold on for the draw. (Cricinfo scorecard)

=== Lancashire v Surrey (30 July) ===
Lancashire won by 20 runs and qualified for the Twenty20 Cup final

In the first of two semi-finals at The Oval on the Twenty20 Cup finals day, Lancashire Lightning lived up to expectations by smashing 217 for 4 in twenty overs against Surrey Lions – well helped by eleven wides and six penalty runs, although Lancashire's top five all contributed. Only Nayan Doshi came away with some face on the bowling side, taking two for 35, but with Andrew Flintoff making 49 and Andrew Symonds an unbeaten 52 the target quickly reached dangerously high levels – from a Surrey perspective, anyway.

Ali Brown and James Benning started well with an opening partnership of 93, as Dominic Cork and James Anderson were taken for runs, but Benning, Scott Newman, Brown and Rikki Clarke fell in quick succession to see Surrey struggle at 104 for 4. Mark Ramprakash and Azhar Mahmood upped the ante again, but when Flintoff and Anderson broke through with one wicket each, and Surrey crumbled to 195 for 7. (Cricinfo scorecard)

=== Sussex v Surrey (3–5 August) ===
Sussex (21pts) beat Surrey (4pts) by five wickets

Surrey won the toss at Hove against Sussex, and chose to bat – and lost the wickets of both their openers in the first 20 minutes to fall to seven for two. Mark Ramprakash, Rikki Clarke and Jonathan Batty steadied the ship, and Surrey made their way to 157 for 3, only for all-rounder Robin Martin-Jenkins to snare a couple of wickets and incite a collapse to 187 for 8. Azhar Mahmood's quickfire 57 not out lifted them to 248, but Sussex posted 67 for the first wicket, and despite by four wickets from Azhar which sent the hosts to 180 for 6, Martin-Jenkins made 88 from number eight to help Sussex to 378 and a lead of 130.

Openers Scott Newman and Richard Clinton made up for their first-innings failure and batted 22 overs until stumps on day two without giving away their wickets, but on the third morning James Kirtley got the vital breakthrough, having Clinton caught for 12 off 79 balls. Rikki Clarke's 75 led Surrey to set a target, at least, as the Pakistanis dominated – Naved-ul-Hasan got four for 70 and Mushtaq Ahmed three for 96. Surrey had some Pakistanis of their own, as Azhar Mahmood and Mohammad Akram took two and one wicket respectively, and Sussex scrambled to 33 for 4 at tea on day 3, chasing a meagre 125 to win. After tea, however, Michael Yardy and Matt Prior attacked Nayan Doshi with fury – Prior finishing with 66 not out off just 48 balls – as Sussex eased to the target with five wickets to spare, losing Yardy for 35 but still holding out for the win. (Cricinfo scorecard)

=== Kent v Surrey (7 August) ===
Surrey (4pts) beat Kent (0pts) by five wickets

Surrey Lions recorded only their fourth win in the National League system this year with a five-wicket win over Kent Spitfires at St Lawrence Ground. Kent, having chosen to bat first, were dismissed by medium-pacer Neil Saker, who took four for 43, and Tim Murtagh, who joined in with three for 28. Jade Dernbach, Ian Salisbury and Nayan Doshi also took a wicket each as Kent finished on 211, with Irish wicket-keeper Niall O'Brien top scoring with 43 – his innings tugged Kent back from 124 for 6. Andrew Hall took three quick wickets as Kent fielded, reducing Surrey to 25 for 3, but Ali Brown's quickfire 65 and Jonathan Batty's 82 turned the match around, and Rikki Clarke hit 35 to take Surrey to the target with nearly four overs to spare. (Cricinfo scorecard)

=== Surrey v Leicestershire (9 August) ===
Surrey (4pts) beat Leicestershire (0pts) by six wickets

HD Ackerman lifted Leicestershire Foxes to a big target against Surrey Lions at The Oval, having opted to bat first after winning the toss. His 78 gave Leicestershire a good platform after losing the first three wickets for 85, and Paul Nixon and Jeremy Snape both scored with a batting strike rate above 150 to get Leicestershire to 258 for 5. Leicestershire dug out three Surrey wickets early, but a massive partnership between Mark Ramprakash and Ali Brown worth 166 runs turned the match around, and despite Charl Willoughby having Ramprakash caught behind, Brown paired up with Azhar Mahmood to hit Surrey to the target with more than five overs to spare. Brown's 108 not out was off only 63 balls, including sixteen boundaries. (Cricinfo scorecard)

=== Surrey v Bangladesh A (10–12 August) ===
Match drawn

A Surrey team including two former internationals – England batsman Mark Butcher returning from injury, and the retiring Pakistani spin bowler Saqlain Mushtaq – amassed 336 for 5 before declaring after 74 overs at The Oval. The internationals made little impact in the first innings, however, as Butcher was caught for 5 and Saqlain did not bat. James Benning slashed 22 boundaries in his 124 before being run out, and wicketkeeper Andrew Hodd made an unbeaten 50 in his first first-class game. Bangladesh A battled well in reply, equalling Surrey's score before they were bowled out, while Saqlain got three for 82. Tushar Imran continued on his rich vein of form, making 70 and top-scoring. Scott Newman and Richard Clinton led Surrey to 73 without loss, but two quick wickets from Talha Jubair turned the game slightly. Mark Butcher repaired his first innings failure, however, as he made 90 to lead Surrey to 332 for 6 before they declared again. Jubair got four for 99 from an expensive 19 overs. However, the task of surviving 24 overs was easy enough for the tourists, who only lost one wicket, that of Shahriar Nafees who made a quickfire 63. (Cricinfo scorecard)

=== Surrey v Gloucestershire (16–19 August) ===
Surrey (12pts) drew with Gloucestershire (11pts)

Surrey's bowlers Azhar Mahmood and Mohammad Akram shared out the first three wickets for only one solitary run, as Gloucestershire looked to collapse in the first innings at The Oval. Alex Gidman fought back, however, making 84 from number six, while Steve Adshead shepherded the tail with 148 not out, and Gloucestershire made their way to 350. Surrey and Pakistan spinner Saqlain Mushtaq ended with one for 110 in his first first class game of the season. Surrey initially struggled with the bat, as opener Mark Butcher only made six before he was dismissed by William Rudge.

However, Gloucestershire's bowlers failed to get consistent bite, and Mark Ramprakash smashed his way past 1,000 first class runs in the season with a season-best 192. He was well supported by Graham Thorpe, Jonathan Batty, Ali Brown and Tim Murtagh, who all made scores above 30, and Surrey finished their first innings with a total of 463 in the middle of the first session on day three, with wickets shared out among the Gloucestershire bowlers. Surrey got an early breakthrough by dismissing Craig Spearman, but Kadeer Ali and Ramnaresh Sarwan stuck to the crease, adding 151 for the second wicket. However, three wickets from Nayan Doshi late on day three seemed to turn the game Surrey's way, with Gloucestershire leading by 181 runs for the loss of six wickets at stumps. However, the fourth day's play was rained off, and the match ended in a draw. (Cricinfo scorecard)

=== Surrey v Kent (22 August) ===
Match abandoned. Surrey (2pts), Kent (2pts)

This game, which was due to be the second and last day-night one-dayer of the season at the Oval, was abandoned because of rain. (Cricinfo scorecard)

=== Surrey v Hampshire (24–27 August) ===
Hampshire (11pts) drew with Surrey (10pts)

The first day was rained off, and in only three days of cricket, neither team seemed intent on forcing a result, as the run rate was limited to 3.5 runs an over. On the second day, as the first day of actual play, 406 runs were scored for the loss of twelve wickets. Surrey batted first, and after losing Richard Clinton and Mark Ramprakash early, Scott Newman lashed out in a 65-ball cameo. He hit fifteen fours in his 71 before finally being bowled by Dimitri Mascarenhas. Indeed, the second day was a day of boundaries – a total of 270 runs were hit in boundaries, most of them by Mark Butcher (14 fours in 75) and Jonathan Batty (20 fours in 124). Surrey were eventually all out for 378, Shaun Udal wrapping up the tail with the three last wickets falling in four balls. Mohammad Akram then had both openers caught behind as Hampshire closed on 28 for 2, but Surrey toiled for little reward on the third day, Nic Pothas making an unbeaten century as Hampshire declared on 361 for 6, 17 behind Surrey. Thus, the teams were left with a day to play out their second innings, and on the final day, Udal took five for 65 with his off breaks, but Surrey easily saved the draw by making 302, as captain Butcher did not attempt to risk the four points for a draw with a declaration. (Cricinfo scorecard)

=== Surrey v Somerset (28 August) ===
Somerset (4pts) beat Surrey (0pts) by five wickets

Surrey Lions made 237 for 7 batting first at The Oval, despite three wickets from Malaysian Arul Suppiah. The stage was set for a bigger score with James Benning and Mark Butcher in with the score 135 for 1, but Suppiah and Ian Blackwell broke through with wickets to prevent high scoring rates towards the end. Somerset Sabres, and in particular Blackwell, were intent on winning this match. Blackwell hit six sixes and seven fours in a lightning-quick 88, adding 120 with James Hildreth for the fourth wicket before his eventual dismissal – to the part-time off spin of Mark Ramprakash. Despite Nayan Doshi getting another wicket, it was too late for Surrey, as Hildreth added 17 with William Durston to see them across the line with five overs to spare. (Cricinfo scorecard)

=== Sussex v Surrey (31 August) ===
Sussex (4pts) beat Surrey (0pts) by two wickets

Mushtaq Ahmed sealed a last-ball victory for Sussex Sharks in a closely fought match at County Cricket Ground, Hove, against mid-table languishers Surrey Lions. The visitors had opted to bat first, and lost three early wickets for 40 runs, but a calm rearguard from Mark Ramprakash set the stage for some fours from Azhar Mahmood near the end. Surrey finished on 230 for 6, and got a good start when Azhar dismissed Robin Montgomerie for 0. A quick 42 from Matt Prior, however, gave Sussex hope of chasing the target, and despite wickets falling regularly Sussex kept the required rate below seven an over, with captain Chris Adams keeping the innings together with his unbeaten 110. Mushtaq eventually faced the final ball of the match, and he hit it to the boundary, which gave Sussex the win and extended their Division Two lead to ten points. (Cricinfo scorecard)

=== Derbyshire v Surrey (4 September) ===
Surrey (4pts) beat Derbyshire (0pts) by eight wickets

Surrey Lions pace bowlers Azhar Mahmood and Tim Murtagh carved through Derbyshire Phantoms' top order at County Cricket Ground, Derby. The hosts crashed to 34 for 6, Murtagh taking four and Azhar two, before Ant Botha and Tom Lungley added 25 in just over half an hour. Lungley remained at the crease for a first-class-like 21, facing 74 balls, but his partners deserted him to leave him not out. On a day of low first-innings scores, Derbyshire's was the lowest with 88, as Murtagh finished with four for 14 and Azhar with three for 20, both from nine overs. James Benning then hit a boundary-filled 53 to guide Surrey to the target in just over a third of the allotted time. (Cricinfo scorecard)

=== Warwickshire v Surrey (10–13 September) ===
Warwickshire (10pts) drew with Surrey (8pts)

Almost one and a half days was lost to rain at Edgbaston, but when play finally got underway, Surrey tried their best to force a result – needing a win in this match to avoid losing too much ground to Middlesex in the relegation battle. As a result, seven of the dismissals were outfield catches, as Surrey were bowled out for 225 in the 60 overs possible on day two. Hosts Warwickshire started strongly, Ian Westwood and Nick Knight adding 93 for the first wicket, but Jade Dernbach had two men bowled as Surrey started to eye a hope. Scores of 60 from Alex Loudon and Michael Powell, along with 117 from Knight, saw Warwickshire to 338, a lead of 113. Losing three wickets early, Surrey went on the defensive in order not to lose further points, and 127 from Mark Ramprakash along with solid contributions from Rikki Clarke and wicket-keeper Jonathan Batty lifted them to 313 for 5. Surrey declared when Ramprakash was dismissed, giving Warwickshire 11 overs to bat, and Knight and Westwood batted out without loss to draw the game.

=== Warwickshire v Surrey (14 September) ===
Warwickshire (4pts) beat Surrey (0pts) by 68 runs

Warwickshire Bears hammered the Surrey Lions' bowlers at Edgbaston, which resulted in the Bears recording 292 for 8 batting first. Neil Carter set that pace, taking eleven fours in a blitzing thirty-ball 51 – his fourth half-century in List A cricket. Jade Dernbach had him caught, however, but that didn't stop Warwickshire, as Jamie Troughton slashed five sixes and six fours before brothers Tim and Chris Murtagh combined to remove him for 82 – caught Chris, bowled Tim. However, Troughton had added 144 with Jonathan Trott, and not even four late wickets from Rikki Clarke could stop the flow of runs, and both Jade Dernbach and Azhar Mahmood conceded 61 in their nine overs. Surrey had six batsmen going into double figures in their reply, but no partnership was worth 50, as Jamie Anyon and Trott got three wickets each. Extras were the second highest scorer, with 32, behind Clarke's 42. (Cricinfo scorecard)

=== Surrey v Middlesex (21–24 September) ===
Surrey (20pts) beat Middlesex (6pts) by an innings and 39 runs

Middlesex won the toss and batted first at The Oval in this relegation clash, where Surrey needed to win by 15 points to avoid relegation. After half-centuries from Owais Shah, Ben Hutton and Ed Joyce, however, Middlesex were 200 for 4, and Joyce put on a fifth-wicket partnership of 174 with Scott Styris. Styris hit thirteen fours and a six in his 100 not out, his first century in nine matches for Middlesex in 2005, and once Styris had hit his century Hutton declared the Middlesex innings closed on 404 for 5 – ensuring that Middlesex got all five batting points and Surrey only got one bowling point. Surrey thus needed to score 400 runs in 130 overs for only two wickets if they were to survive in Division One. However, six minutes into the innings, captain Mark Butcher was run out for 5, and Rikki Clarke went shortly afterwards. Surrey closed on 59 for 2, needing 341 without further loss to avoid the drop. Middlesex got the wicket they needed on the second morning, with Yogesh Golwalkar dismissing Scott Newman lbw for 51, leaving Surrey to relegation. Despite that, they accumulated runs to end the second day on 462 for 4, although 33 overs were bowled by Shah, Hutton and Joyce. Mark Ramprakash reached 200 not out by the close, his tenth first class double century.

Surrey passed 600 on the third day, before Shah picked up his second wicket of the match, removing Ramprakash for 252 – ending an all-time record fifth-wicket partnership of 318. Azhar Mahmood, who had shared the stand with Ramprakash, went on to make 204 not out before Surrey declared on 686 for 7 – before leg-spinners Saqlain Mushtaq and Ian Salisbury shared six wickets between them to bowl Middlesex out for 243 and to record an innings victory – to no avail, as Midldesex finished one point ahead in the final table. (Cricinfo scorecard)

=== Surrey v Scotland (25 September) ===
Surrey (4pts) beat Scotland (0pts) by eight wickets (Duckworth–Lewis method)

The Scottish Saltires' bowed out of the National League with a loss, to end their three-year spell in the English domestic competition with eight wins, four no-results, one tie and 41 losses. Surrey's opening bowlers Tim Murtagh and Mohammad Akram reduced them to 40 for 5, but 21-year-old Omer Hussain made 52 in his first List A innings, adding 125 for the seventh wicket with Craig Wright, who ended unbeaten on 88. Jade Dernbach took the four last wickets, ending with four for 36, while Akram took two for 19 in his nine overs as Scotland posted 212 for 9. Surrey's innings was shortened by three overs, and their target by nine runs, and thanks to 80 from Scott Newman and 51 from Jonathan Batty they got 204 for 2 after only 30.3 of the allotted 42 overs. (Cricinfo scorecard)
