= 2006 English cricket season =

County Championship
- Champions: Sussex
- Runners-up: Lancashire
- Most runs: Mark Ramprakash (2,211)
- Most wickets: Mushtaq Ahmed (102)

Cheltenham & Gloucester Trophy
- Champions: Sussex Sharks
- Runners-up: Lancashire Lightning
- Most runs: Mal Loye (543)
- Most wickets: James Kirtley (19)

NatWest Pro40
- Champions: Essex Eagles
- Runners-up: Northamptonshire Steelbacks
- Most runs: Owais Shah (360)
- Most wickets: Nayan Doshi (19)

Twenty20 Cup
- Champions: Leicestershire Foxes
- Runners-up: Nottinghamshire Outlaws
- Most runs: Justin Langer (464)
- Most wickets: Nayan Doshi (21)

PCA Player of the Year
- Mark Ramprakash

Wisden Cricketers of the Year
- Paul Collingwood; Mahela Jayawardene; Mohammad Yousuf; Monty Panesar; Mark Ramprakash

The 2006 English cricket season was the 107th in which the County Championship had been an official competition. It included home international series for England against Sri Lanka and Pakistan. England came off a winter with more Test losses than wins, for the first time since 2002-03, but still attained their best series result in India since 1985. The One Day International series against Pakistan and India both ended in losses.

In domestic cricket, Nottinghamshire, holders of the County Championship, were relegated, and it was Sussex who took the Championship title as their Pakistani overseas player Mushtaq Ahmed ended with 102 wickets. Sussex pipped Lancashire to the title, as they did in the one-day C&G Trophy, which was changed from a direct knock-out into two regional leagues of 10, from which two teams progressed to the final at Lord's, where Sussex won by 15 runs. Essex Eagles defended their National League title from last season, a league tournament that has been shortened from 16 to eight matches per side and officially named Pro40. They finished level with Northamptonshire Steelbacks in the table, though the Steelbacks lost by 109 runs in their meeting. The Twenty20 Cup completed its fourth instalment during 2006, and was won by Leicestershire Foxes, the first team to win the Twenty20 Cup twice.

== Roll of honour ==
Test series

- England v Sri Lanka: 3 Tests - series drawn 1–1.
- England v Pakistan: 4 Tests - England win 3–0.

ODI series

- England in Ireland: England won by 38 runs.
- England v Sri Lanka: Sri Lanka won 5-match series 5–0.
- England v Pakistan: 5-match series tied 2–2.

Twenty20 International

- England v Sri Lanka: Sri Lanka won by two runs.
- England v Pakistan: Pakistan won by five wickets.

County Championship

- Division One winners: Sussex
- Division Two winners: Surrey

Pro40 (National League)

- Division One winners: Essex
- Division Two winners: Gloucestershire

C&G Trophy

- Winners: Sussex - Runners-up: Lancashire

Twenty20 Cup

- Winners: Leicestershire - Runners-up: Nottinghamshire

Minor Counties Championship

- Winners: Devon

MCCA Knockout Trophy

- Winners: Northumberland

Second XI Championship

- Winners: Kent II

Second XI Trophy

- Winners: Warwickshire II

Wisden

- Five Players: tbc

Women's Tests

- England v India: India won 2-match series 1–0.

Women's ODIs

- England v India: England won 5-match series 4–0.

Women's Twenty20 Internationals

- England v India: India won by eight wickets.

Under-19 "Tests"

- England v India: India won 3-match series 1–0.

Under-19 "ODIs"

- England v India: India won 3-match series 3–0.

== Monthly Reviews ==
=== April ===
The season's opening first class game, the Champion County match at Lord's, began on 14 April with a Marylebone Cricket Club team taking on Nottinghamshire. Nottinghamshire earned a lead of 23 on first innings after bowling MCC out for 168, and after centuries from Jason Gallian, Chris Read and Mark Ealham, they declared with a day to spare. Despite 94 from No. 8 Tim Bresnan, MCC lost by 142 runs. A day later, the six three-day university matches between county teams and university teams had begun: the matches were all drawn, though no county team failed to bowl out their opponents in the first innings, and all county teams declared their first innings closed.

On 18 April, the County Championship began, but the first matches were dominated by rain; at Old Trafford, Lancashire and Hampshire played out 169.3 overs, compared to the minimum of 408 set out in ECB regulations, in a drawn game, while Gloucestershire overcame Somerset in Division Two despite 36 and 172 from Australian overseas player Cameron White. Excluding extras, the other ten players contributed with 197 runs, eleven less than White. The other five matches began a day later: Durham's first outing in Division One ended with victory, as Gordon Muchall hit 219 in the first innings and Kent were bowled out for 340 and 179 to leave Durham with a win by an innings and 56 runs, while Nottinghamshire, Yorkshire, Sussex and Warwickshire all recorded draws. In Division Two, Surrey's first match after relegation saw them save the draw after following on against last year's wooden spoon winners Derbyshire, and Essex and Northamptonshire also drew. Two of the three university matches that week had two days rained out; the third, between Middlesex and Oxford UCCE was drawn.

The first round of the league stage of the C&G Trophy was played out on 23 April. In the South Conference, Essex (in a 10-over affair), Gloucestershire, Hampshire and Somerset (after Marcus Trescothick's 158) recorded wins, while Derbyshire, Lancashire and Worcestershire won in the North. Sri Lanka began their tour the following day, drawing with a British Universities XI at Fenner's, and the second round of the Championship took place from 26 April to 29 April with seven matches. Durham fell back to earth after their initial win, giving up 421 runs in the first innings to Lancashire and losing by 128 runs, while Pakistanis Naved-ul-Hasan and Mushtaq Ahmed claimed 14 of 20 wickets for Sussex in their win at Hampshire, who failed to pick up batting points for the second time this season. Kent chased down 354 for the loss of three wickets against Middlesex at Lord's, and Warwickshire, despite giving up 433 in the fourth innings, beat Yorkshire to go top of the table.

In Division Two, Essex made 639 with three centuries before declaring against Glamorgan, which was enough to win by an innings and 30. Essex thus topped the table, while Glamorgan was bottom. Surrey beat Leicestershire by 99 runs, and Somerset beat Worcestershire in a match where three of the innings totalled less than 170 runs, and Somerset's first was worth 406 and full batting points. Meanwhile, three counties played university matches, with Nottinghamshire and Gloucestershire recording innings victories while Northamptonshire came back from a four-run first innings deficit against Cambridge to win by 193 runs.

The last matches of the month were those of the second round of the C&G Trophy, along with Derbyshire's tour match against Sri Lanka. Derbyshire got a first innings lead of 43 after Sri Lanka declared their first innings closed, and Australian Travis Birt hit 83 off 53 balls before Derbyshire declared overnight on 208 for 4. In the C&G Trophy, Ireland bounced back from an early loss when they successfully defended 193 against Gloucestershire, while Warwickshire made 352 for two against Scotland to win by 114 runs, and Sussex converted seven for two into a successful chase of 273 against Surrey.

=== May ===
On 1 May, nine matches were played in the C&G Trophy, with only Derbyshire and Yorkshire resting. Five of the matches were affected by rain, though no team played fewer than 30 overs. In the North, Durham won their first one-day game of the season, Scotland suffered their second loss in as many days at the hands of Nottinghamshire, Lancashire were the only team with two wins after bowling Worcestershire out for 129, while Warwickshire's 128 for 9 in 33 overs led to loss against Leicestershire.

In the South, Hampshire toppled leaders Essex after Shane Warne, Shaun Udal and Dominic Thornely shared out the last six wickets for 34 runs, in what was called a "collapse in spectacular fashion", securing an eight-run win. England international Darren Gough strained a hamstring during the game. Glamorgan beat Ireland by 15 runs but had England Test bowler Simon Jones injured, Surrey beat Kent by one solitary run in a 30-over affair at St Lawrence Ground, and Gloucestershire beat neighbours Somerset on the back of 112 off 79 balls from Ian Harvey and five wickets from spinner Martyn Ball, which meant they led the South Division after this round. The final match saw Sussex beat Middlesex to go third in the table.

Eight County Championship matches began on 3 May, along with the University match between Worcestershire and Bradford/Leeds UCCE, which Worcestershire won by 250 runs after making 500 for 2 declared in the first innings. Thus, Durham were the only team without a game. In Division One, Warwickshire were passed by Lancashire on the table despite beating Nottinghamshire by 60 runs - their first innings total of 248 only gave them one bonus point. Nottinghamshire wicketkeeper David Alleyne made 109 not out in the second innings, but was deserted by his batting partners as they totalled 316 in chase of 377 to win. Lancashire took the Championship lead, chasing 89 in the fourth innings and succeeding with the loss of four wickets against Kent at Old Trafford, while Sussex beat Yorkshire at Headingley after 11 wickets from Naved-ul-Hasan and 124 and 55 not out from Matt Prior. The final match saw Middlesex get their second loss of the season, as they were bowled out for 98 after opting to bat and ended with a ten-wicket defeat to Hampshire.

Surrey took over the lead in Division Two after beating Gloucestershire by an innings and 297 runs, with Mark Ramprakash hitting 292 for Surrey, while Essex went down at home to Leicestershire after being forced to follow on. Somerset failed to exploit the first-innings 154 from Marcus Trescothick, losing by an innings and 46 to Northamptonshire, whose top-scorer Lance Klusener made 147 not out, and Derbyshire successfully defended a target of 213 against Glamorgan to win by 28 runs, with Steffan Jones taking six for 25.

England A also played the touring Sri Lankans while this round of county cricket was on, starting their game on 4 May. Jon Lewis grabbed nine wickets in England A's ten-wicket win, while Rob Key was the only batsman to hit a half-century. The Sunday saw seven C&G Trophy games: in the South, there was little change at the top, but Essex went third after downing Ireland. Middlesex and Somerset also recorded wins. In the North, rain affected all four matches; Yorkshire and Nottinghamshire had to abandon their clash at Headingley, while Lancashire extended their lead with an eight-wicket win at Northamptonshire. Durham and Derbyshire were second and third after wins, and Scotland defended 188 in 25 overs to beat Worcestershire and record their first win of the season.

The next round of the Championship had a staggered start: three matches began on 9 May, and five on 10 May. Warwickshire lost sight of the leaders after a 193-run loss to Hampshire, while Lancashire had to give up their league lead while being on a bye. They played Durham UCCE, drawing the three-day game. Sussex seized the chance, beating defending champions Nottinghamshire inside three days at Hove despite going 86 down on first innings, which was enough to see them take the league lead. Middlesex lost their third successive Championship match, to Durham, while Kent and Yorkshire drew.

Glamorgan stopped their run of defeats in Division Two of the Championship, batting through 108 overs to make 267 for five after following on, while Essex went top of the table after beating Somerset in a game where Essex declared 71 behind on first innings. Somerset responded by declaring overnight on 275 for five, setting Essex 347 to win, which they made in 90.4 overs after being at 125 for four. There were also wins for Gloucestershire and Derbyshire.

This week also staged the first Test match of the English season. England, once again led by Andrew Flintoff due to Michael Vaughan's knee injury, batted first against Sri Lanka, declared on 551 for six, then took 19 wickets over the remaining three and a half days of play as the game ended in a draw. During the Test, seven matches in the C&G Trophy were played; Kent recorded their first win, beating Hampshire on the last ball, while the still unbeaten Sussex and Essex broke away from the rest with wins and Surrey and Ireland played out a no-result in Belfast. In the North, Lancashire totalled 307 for three against Durham to win by 125 runs and extend their streak of one-day victories to four in four games, while Derbyshire remained second, also unbeaten, after bowling Warwickshire out for 197 to win by nine runs. Yorkshire opened their account of wins by beating Northamptonshire by two runs despite 161 from Northamptonshire's David Sales, and Worcestershire beat Leicestershire.

The next week included four Championship and three UCCE matches, in addition to Sussex' tour match with the Sri Lankans. Despite not playing Championship cricket, Sussex remained Championship leaders for another week, but Lancashire closed the gap to one point after their draw in Yorkshire, and Durham went third after attaining the same result at Nottinghamshire. In Division Two, Derbyshire, as the only unbeaten team, took over the lead with a home draw against Leicestershire, while Phil Jaques took 69 balls to hit 107 as Worcestershire chased 287 despite rain shortening their chase to 32 overs. Jaques, who played his first match in the English season, could later read that his innings was named "Innings of the Week" by Cricinfo. In the UCCE matches, Kent, Hampshire and Somerset all drew, as did Sussex in their tour match with Sri Lanka, which included centuries from Upul Tharanga, Thilan Samaraweera and Chamara Kapugedera before the visitors declared on 521 for five. Sussex' number eight Oliver Rayner then hit a debut 101 after coming in at 98 for six, helping Sussex to avoid defeat. In the C&G Trophy, six matches were scheduled in England, but all ended in abandonment or no results due to the weather conditions. Scotland did get to play at Edinburgh, however, beating Northamptonshire by 52 runs. The top teams in both divisions were not scheduled to play, however.

The fourth and final week once again included the full Championship round of eight matches, in addition to the second Test match between England and Sri Lanka. Again, most matches ended in draws, though Sussex increased their lead after Naved-ul-Hasan and Mushtaq Ahmed shared 19 wickets in Durham's efforts of 110 and 80. Sussex totalled 229 in their only innings to win by an innings and 39 runs. Middlesex avoided defeat for the first time this season, but were still bottom, while Lancashire went second and Warwickshire third. In Division Two, Essex drew level with Derbyshire in the table after gaining four more bonus points, while Glamorgan were one wicket away from their first win of the season after having Worcestershire at 117 for nine; however, they finished the game with fewer points than their opponents Worcestershire. The Test gave England their first win of the home summer, with Liam Plunkett taking three top-order wickets as Sri Lanka were bowled out for 141. England took a first innings lead of 156 after a hundred from Kevin Pietersen, and despite Michael Vandort's second-innings hundred, England made it to the target of 81 with six wickets to spare.

The double round of C&G Trophy matches saw 15 games played, six on 28 May and nine on the following day. The first day saw Derbyshire get their first defeat all season when they went down to Scotland at home, with Ryan Watson hitting 108 for the Scots. Lancashire failed to take advantage of Derbyshire's defeat, however, failing to defend 288 against Yorkshire, but they remained on top ahead of Worcestershire, who beat Northamptonshire on the back of a hundred from Phil Jaques. In the South, Sussex remained undefeated after chasing 297 to win at The County Ground, Chelmsford. Essex' total was helped by 132 from Ronnie Irani, but Murray Goodwin responded by making 158 not out for Sussex. Gloucestershire went second after defeating Glamorgan, while Ireland fell to bottom after losing to Middlesex.

Lancashire remained on top of the North Division at the end of May, despite playing out a no-result with Nottinghamshire, as Derbyshire beat second-placed Worcestershire to go back into second place, followed by Yorkshire who defeated Scotland at Headingley. There were also wins for Durham and Warwickshire. In the South, Sussex stretched their runs of victories to five, which also saw them go three points clear of any challengers as Gloucestershire went down to Hampshire. Kent and Surrey also won matches in the South.

=== June ===
Six Championship matches began on 31 May, stretching into the first week of June. Sussex continued their winning ways, beating Middlesex at Horsham to win their fifth match out of six, while Kent and Hampshire also recorded wins in Division One. Surrey went top of Division Two after beating Essex at Whitgift School, while Glamorgan lost to Somerset inside two days at Swansea and Leicestershire played out a draw with Northamptonshire. The week also saw Durham beat Oxford UCCE by four wickets in the final University match, which included four centuries and in which no team were all out in any of their innings.

On 2 June, England began their chase of a series win against Sri Lanka, but chasing 325 on a fourth-day pitch against Muttiah Muralitharan proved too much; Muralitharan claimed eight wickets in the second innings as Sri Lanka won by 134 runs, bringing his tally for the series to 24. On the same day, Gloucestershire and Warwickshire finished their match, which ended in a draw after three innings exceeding 190 (from Vikram Solanki, Steven Davies and Craig Spearman).

Meanwhile, eight matches were played in the C&G Trophy: Derbyshire started early, losing to Nottinghamshire on 2 June after being bowled out for 194, but most games were played on 4 June. Durham beat Yorkshire on the last ball, England bowler Steve Harmison getting an "inside edge...past wicket-keeper Gerard Brophy" for four to secure a two-wicket win. Australian opener Jimmy Maher hit 124 not out for Durham, who still remained two points adrift of Lancashire after the Lancastrians won by five wickets against Scotland in Edinburgh. Northamptonshire got their seventh loss of the season, falling to Leicestershire, while in the South Sussex lost their first game of the season, Justin Kemp hitting seven sixes for Kent at Tunbridge Wells in a six-wicket win, while Hampshire, Middlesex and Somerset all won games.

The next week included seven Championship matches, with leaders Sussex taking on third-placed Lancashire at Old Trafford. Lancashire, with a game in hand, were trailing by 30 points before this, but closed the gap to 14 after taking advantage of a first-innings lead of 99. Sajid Mahmood then took five of Sussex' ten wickets as they were bowled out for 166, and Lancashire took a nine-wicket win inside two days. However, due to Hampshire's 299-run win over Nottinghamshire, Lancashire remained third, but still with a game in hand over the two teams ahead. Warwickshire came back from a 151-run first innings deficit against Durham, with Trevor Frost and Heath Streak putting on 119 for the ninth wicket and then Frost adding a further 20 with Lee Daggett. Those stands upped the target to 159, and Daggett then took six for 30 as Durham were bowled out for 141. The final game in Division One saw Middlesex get out of the relegation zone temporarily, as they bowled Yorkshire out for 130 in the third innings of the game and then chased down the target with eight wickets in hand.

In Division Two, Glamorgan got their first win after their Australian overseas player Mark Cosgrove hit 233 against Derbyshire, and Worcestershire beat Somerset with Ben Smith making a double hundred. Another double hundred came at The Oval, where Surrey made 668 for seven declared and Ali Brown 215 in their innings victory against Leicestershire. The win secured a substantial lead over second-placed Essex, who were playing the touring Sri Lankans in a one-day game and got a six-wicket win after half-centuries from Mark Pettini and Ryan ten Doeschate.

11 June saw eight C&G Trophy matches, and in the South, Sussex rebounded from their losses to take a three-point lead with two games to go, while Kent and Middlesex secured wins to stay in the hunt for the first place which would give a place in the final. In the North, Lancashire beat Derbyshire to eliminate the latter from contention, and the Northern spot was now purely between Lancashire and Durham with two weeks remaining of the competition. Somerset also played cricket, a tour match with Sri Lanka, which they won by 51 runs after posting 332 for six and then bowling Sri Lanka out for 281, with Charl Willoughby taking six for 43.

England travelled to Ireland to play a one-off One Day International, where they beat their hosts by 38 runs after batting first and making 301 for seven, though they failed to bowl the Irish out in 50 overs. Two matches in Division One also started on that day, and were completed in three days, Kent beating Durham and Nottinghamshire escaping the relegation zone after beating Middlesex by an innings and 33 runs. Five matches started a day later, with Lancashire beating Warwickshire inside three days to take the Division One lead from Sussex, Somerset failing to defend 356 against Surrey at Bath with Ali Brown scoring 126 at faster than a run a ball, Worcestershire visiting Essex and scoring 650 for the second time in as many weeks to win by nine wickets, while Gloucestershire failed to convert their 750 runs into a victory over Derbyshire. The final match saw Glamorgan bowling Northamptonshire out for 178 and taking a first-innings lead, before a second-innings hundred from Usman Afzaal helped Northamptonshire total 400, setting Glamorgan 225 to win. Then, Matthew Nicholson took six wickets with the new ball, Monty Panesar three, and Glamorgan were bowled out for 56.

Meanwhile, England were back playing Sri Lanka, this time for a Twenty20 International. After bowling Sri Lanka out for 163, England required 12 off the last eight balls, with opener Marcus Trescothick just run out for 72, and England could not quite score quickly enough, ending on 161 for five. In the C&G Trophy, Sussex qualified for the final with a week to go when they chased 255 against Hampshire, in a match where Sussex captain Chris Adams claimed the hosts "were dead and buried" after 15 overs.

The One-day International series began on Saturday 17 June, and Sri Lanka batted first to win in both the first two matches: first defending 257 for nine after Upul Tharanga scored a career-best 120, then 319 for seven with Sanath Jayasuriya making a hundred.

On the weekend, five C&G Trophy matches were played: Middlesex went second in the South Division after a three-run win at Somerset, taking over from Hampshire, while Essex and Gloucestershire also recorded wins. In the North, Northamptonshire won their first match of the season after Derbyshire lost their way from two to win and two wickets in hand, while Nottinghamshire beat Warwickshire.

The last County Championship round before the Twenty20 Cup began on 20 June. In Division One, both Lancashire and Sussex scored 22-point victories after piling on more than 500 runs in their first innings. Their victims, Middlesex and Yorkshire respectively, made up the foot of the table. Hampshire retained third place at the summer break despite going down to Durham; they were bowled out for 104 in chase of 332 on the third day, with Callum Thorp taking five wickets to complete his 11-wicket-haul in the match. In the final match of the division, Kent drew Nottinghamshire, in a match where 19 wickets fell for 1206 runs. In Division Two, Worcestershire closed the gap to Surrey to 18 points after an innings victory over Nottinghamshire, while Essex passed Derbyshire in the table with an eight-wicket win at Derby. Surrey drew with Glamorgan, surrendering a 72-run first innings lead to lose two points, and Gloucestershire won at Leicester.

The weekend began with Sri Lanka securing an unassailable 3–0 lead in the ODI series, chasing down 262 after a hundred from Mahela Jayawardene, before the final round of the C&G Trophy on 25 June. In the North, Lancashire and Durham were neck-and-neck before the final round, with Lancashire heading the table on net run rate. And after chasing 250 at Warwickshire, they booked their place in the final, as Durham could not complete their part of the bargain; they failed to defend 274 after a hundred from Derbyshire's No. 5, Chris Taylor. The other matches in the North had Leicestershire, Worcestershire and Nottinghamshire as winners. In the South, Sussex bowled out Gloucestershire for 98 only to fall short by two runs in a match not affected by rain, Middlesex held on to second place after beating Kent, and Essex finished third after beating Surrey. There was also wins for Hampshire and Somerset.

The Twenty20 Cup began on 27 June with a full round of matches. In the North, Derbyshire, Nottinghamshire and Yorkshire recorded wins, Surrey won in the South along with Kent and Sussex after posting the highest score of the day with 218 for seven, including an opening stand of 148, before Tim Murtagh took three wickets and sent Middlesex to 13 for four, and in Midlands/Wales/West holders Somerset set a Twenty20 record total with 250 for three after Cameron White's unbeaten 116 and Justin Langer's 90, which saw them beat Gloucestershire by 117 runs. Warwickshire and Glamorgan also won.

On 28 June, Sri Lanka continued with their fourth successive ODI win, scoring 318 for seven with only Jamie Dalrymple conceding less than five an over, and bowling England out for 285 in the 49th over. Four Twenty20 matches were played in the evening: Essex and Surrey both bowled their opponents out for less than 110 in the South to achieve wins, Durham mustered 123 all out in a 52-run defeat at Nottinghamshire, and Glamorgan beat Warwickshire by six wickets after a 106-run stand between David Hemp and James Franklin. Four more games were played the following day, with three coming down to the last ball: Worcestershire needed three to win off three balls, but were limited by bowler Jon Lewis and Gloucestershire to a leg bye off the last ball, while Northants achieved a tie with Somerset after being 53 for five chasing 152 to win, and Lancashire hit the winning runs against Leicestershire on the final ball. In the final match, Hampshire totalled 225 for two, and won by 59 runs.

A full round of nine games was held on Friday 30 June, with Worcestershire getting bowled out for the lowest score of the competition this year, totalling 86 as Northamptonshire won their first game. In the other games in Midlands/Wales/West, Gloucestershire got their first win with a three-run win over Warwickshire, and Somerset were defeated by Glamorgan's last pair on the final ball. Surrey got their first loss of the year after Yasir Arafat of Sussex took four wickets in their five-wicket win, leaving Nottinghamshire (who beat Yorkshire by 21 runs) and Glamorgan as the only unbeaten teams in the competition. Leicestershire and Durham also won in the North.

=== August ===
On 12 August, Leicestershire became the first English county team to win the Twenty20 cup for a second time, in only its fourth year. The Foxes beat home team Nottinghamshire by 4 runs in a tense final at Trent Bridge. Man of the match Darren Maddy scored a record 86 not out in the final, and in doing so became the first man to score over 1000 runs in the format. On 20 August, the Fourth Test descended into chaos after the Pakistan team refused to come out after tea, in protest at having been penalised for ball tampering. The match subsequently became the first ever test to be forfeited and was awarded to England by the umpires.

== Annual reviews ==
- Playfair Cricket Annual 2007
- Wisden Cricketers' Almanack 2007
