= Paul Clinton (cricketer) =

English cricketer

Personal information
- Full name: Paul James Selvey Clinton
- Born: 30 August 1983 (age 43); Dartford, Kent, England
- Batting: Right-handed
- Bowling: Right-arm medium
- Relatives: Grahame Clinton (uncle); Richard Clinton (cousin)

Domestic team information
- Years: Team
- 2004–2005: Oxford UCCE
- 2004–2006: Oxford University

Career statistics
Competition	First-class
Matches	6
Runs scored	67
Batting average	9.57
100s/50s	–/–
Top score	24
Catches/stumpings	–/–
- Source: Cricinfo, 24 February 2020

Paul James Selvey Clinton (born 30 August 1983) is an English former first-class cricketer.

Clinton was born at Dartford in August 1983. He was educated at Colfe's School, before going up to Keble College, Oxford. While studying at Oxford he played first-class cricket, making his debut for Oxford UCCE against Kent at Oxford in 2004. (Note: Oxford UCCE differed from Oxford University Cricket Club in that it was open to students at Oxford Brookes University, whereas Oxford University Cricket Club is exclusively for students of the constituent colleges of the University of Oxford.) He played first-class cricket for Oxford UCCE on two further occasions in 2005, in addition to making three first-class appearances for Oxford University against Cambridge University in The University Matches of 2004, 2005 and 2006. Playing in six first-class matches, Clinton scored 67 runs with a high score of 24. His uncle Grahame Clinton and cousin Richard Clinton both played first-class cricket.
