= James Benning =

James Benning may refer to:

- James Benning (film director) (born 1942), American filmmaker
- James Benning (cricketer) (born 1983), English cricketer
- Jim Benning (born 1963), Canadian ice hockey player and executive
