= Ian Salisbury =

English cricketer and cricket coach

Personal information
- Full name: Ian David Kenneth Salisbury
- Born: 21 January 1970 (age 56); Northampton, England
- Batting: Right-handed
- Bowling: Right-arm leg break

Career statistics
Competition	Tests	ODIs
Matches	15	4
Runs scored	368	7
Batting average	16.72	7.00
100s/50s	0/1	0/0
Top score	50	5
Balls bowled	2,492	186
Wickets	20	5
Bowling average	76.95	35.39
5 wickets in innings	0	0
10 wickets in match	0	0
Best bowling	4/163	3/41
Catches/stumpings	5/–	1/–
- Source: CricInfo, 9 August 2005

Ian David Kenneth Salisbury (born 21 January 1970) is an English former cricketer, one of the few leg-spinners to play Test cricket for England in recent years. Salisbury played in fifteen Tests and four One Day Internationals between 1992 and 2000. He played first-class cricket for Sussex, Surrey and Warwickshire in a career stretching from 1989 to 2008.

The cricket writer, Colin Bateman, commented, "the selection of Ian Salisbury against Pakistan in 1992 made cricket romantics rejoice. When he played at Lord's he became the first specialist leg-spinner selected for England since Robin Hobbs in 1971". The reality was that in his subsequent Test career, Salisbury's tally of twenty wickets cost almost 77 runs apiece.

== Early career ==
Salisbury was born in Northampton, England, and made his first-class debut for Sussex in 1989, taking the wicket of Ian Austin in both innings. The following year he claimed 42 wickets, albeit at a somewhat expensive average of 49.40, but his potential was recognised with a spot on the England A tour to Pakistan and Sri Lanka, and the following winter (again with England A) he toured West Indies with some success, taking 14 wickets at 27.42.

1992 was Salisbury's breakthrough year, seeing him pick up 87 first-class wickets at under 29 apiece, including six five-wicket hauls. He was rewarded both with being named one of the Wisden Cricketers of the Year in the next year's Almanack, and with his Test match debut.

== International career ==
His first appearance for England was in June 1992, against Pakistan at Lord's. This was his best Test match with the ball, and he took five wickets, although finishing on the losing side. In the next Test he made an important half-century in the first-innings, which helped England draw the match, though he had a poor match with the ball, and was then dropped for the rest of the summer.

This was to become a familiar pattern, as England regularly turned to Salisbury now that leg-spin was being made fashionable again by the emergence of Shane Warne, and just as regularly discarded him after a couple of matches; never in his fifteen Test career did he play more than three games in a row.

The muddled selectoral thinking which affected Salisbury and other England players in this era was epitomised with his next test appearance against India in 1993. The Wisden review of this tour observed: "rarely, if ever, have so much scorn, indignation and fury been heaped on the selection of a touring team before it even boarded the plane, let alone played a match, as happened when it was announced that David Gower, Jack Russell and Ian Salisbury had been left out". Salisbury eventually joined the party as a net bowler, but for the first Test at Kolkata, in spin-friendly conditions, Salisbury was picked as the only specialist spin bowler, elevated ahead of Phil Tufnell and John Emburey, even though he had not been included in the original tour party. England lost the match and the series heavily, none of the specialist spinners having a good tour.

The following winter he took his best Test bowling figures, 4-163, although these were still expensive wickets and Salisbury again finished on the losing side. He did get to appear on the winning side in his fourth and last one-day international on this tour, also taking his best one-day international figures, 3-41.

In 1998 he was in the side as England won two Test matches at Trent Bridge and Headingley, and thereby the Test series, against South Africa. He did not take a wicket in either match, although he made 23 as a nightwatchman at Trent Bridge.

In truth Salisbury was not good enough to prosper at the highest level as a specialist bowler, with a career Test bowling average of 76.95, and he has been rated as the worst specialist bowler in Test cricket. He played his last Test in a series in Pakistan in 2000/01 in Karachi, returning a series aggregate of 1–193. When he finally picked up his solitary wicket of the series, a Daily Telegraph correspondent cruelly wrote: "It was as if a backward child had suddenly learned how to spell his name and deserved a treat." Nonetheless, again he finished on the winning side in the series, and contributed some runs as a lower-order batsman and a nightwatchman.

== Surrey ==
In county cricket, however, Salisbury was a different man. He passed 50 wickets most seasons, and when he left Sussex for Surrey in 1997 he revelled in wickets that suited his bowling style. In successive seasons his bowling average improved: 31.20, 22.89, 22.19, and in 2000 he took 52 wickets at just 18.92, including a career-best 8–60 (and 11–101 in the match) at The Oval against Somerset.

1999 saw the first of Salisbury's three first-class hundreds, exactly 100 not out against Somerset as he shared a ninth-wicket partnership of 122 with Martin Bicknell. His second century (101 not out) came in 2003 against Leicestershire, and his third century (103 not out) came against Hampshire in 2007 sharing in a stand of 177 with Azhar Mahmood.

After 2003, Salisbury played increasingly less first-class cricket, and in 2004 he took just 14 wickets at an average of over 50. By 2005, he was making more appearances for the second eleven than for the first team. In 2006, Salisbury enjoyed the lower standard of cricket to be found in the County Championship's second division, and formed a decent spin partnership with Nayan Doshi, that played an important role in Surrey's promotion campaign.

Salisbury was released by Surrey at the end of the 2007 campaign, ending a ten-year stint at the club. This was connected to Surrey's re-signing of Saqlain Mushtaq from Sussex in the same month.

== Warwickshire ==
In November 2007, Salisbury signed a two-year contract with Warwickshire – following the county's failed attempt to lure Mushtaq Ahmed in the summer.

== Retirement and coaching ==
In March 2009, at the age of 39, Salisbury announced his retirement from first-class cricket. Salisbury initially accepted a two-year extension to his playing contract with Warwickshire, but instead decided to end his playing career, and take up a role as a coach with his former county, Surrey. He replaced the South Africa-bound Nadeem Shahid as the second team coach, being promoted to first team coach for the 2012 season.

On 17 June 2013 it was announced by Surrey County Cricket Club that Salisbury had been sacked, along with the first team director of cricket Chris Adams.

In May 2017 Salisbury was named as Head Coach for the England Physical Disability Cricket team.
