= Mark Ramprakash =

Former English cricketer (born 1969)

Mark Ramprakash MBE
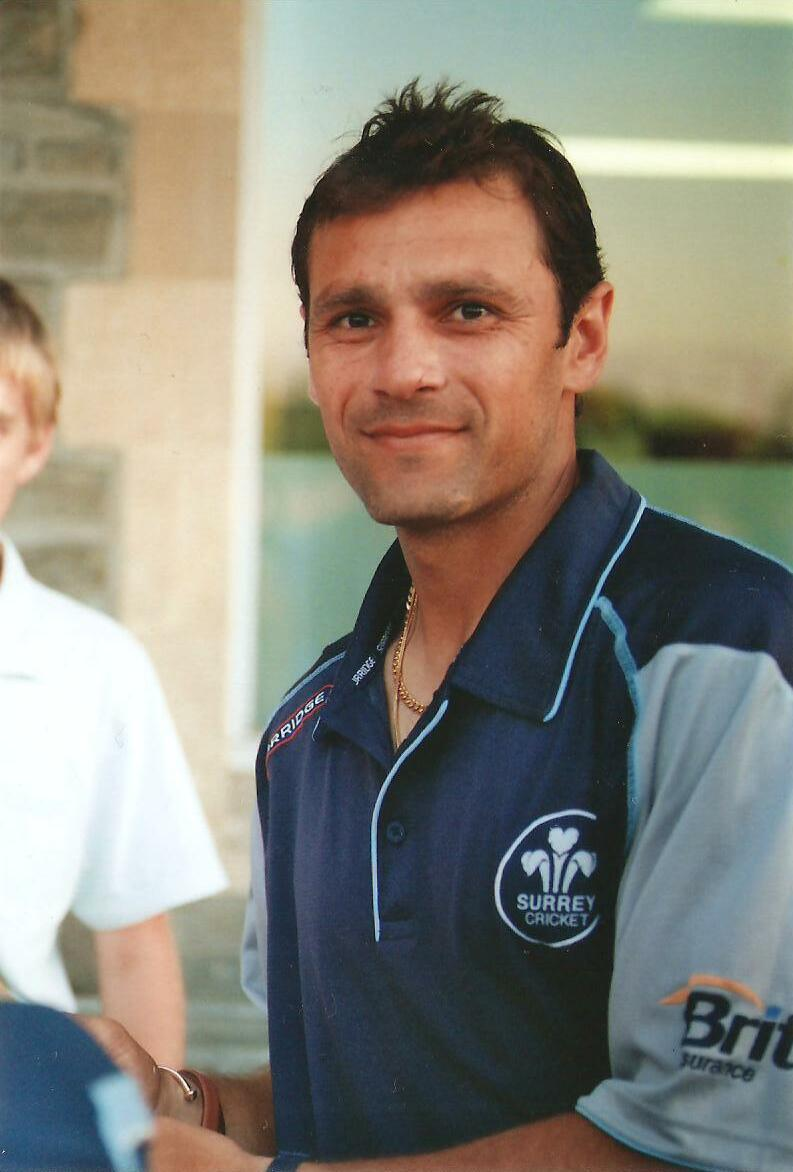

Personal information
- Full name: Mark Ravindra Ramprakash
- Born: 5 September 1969 (age 57); Bushey, Hertfordshire, England
- Nickname: Bloodaxe, Ramps
- Height: 5 ft 10 in (1.78 m)
- Batting: Right-handed
- Bowling: Right arm off-spin
- Role: Batsman

International information
- National side: England
- Test debut (cap 549): 6 June 1991 v West Indies
- Last Test: 3 April 2002 v New Zealand
- ODI debut (cap 114): 25 May 1991 v West Indies
- Last ODI: 13 October 2001 v Zimbabwe

Domestic team information
- Years: Team
- 1987–2000: Middlesex
- 2001–2012: Surrey (squad no. 77)

Career statistics
Competition	Test	ODI	FC	LA
Matches	52	18	461	407
Runs scored	2,350	376	35,659	13,273
Batting average	27.32	26.85	53.14	40.22
100s/50s	2/12	0/1	114/147	17/85
Top score	154	51	301*	147*
Balls bowled	895	132	4,177	1,734
Wickets	4	4	34	46
Bowling average	119.25	27.00	64.76	29.43
5 wickets in innings	0	0	0	1
10 wickets in match	0	0	0	0
Best bowling	1/2	3/28	3/32	5/38
Catches/stumpings	39/–	8/–	261/–	136/–
- Source: CricketArchive, 11 July 2013

Mark Ravindra Ramprakash MBE (born 5 September 1969) is an English former cricketer and cricket coach.

Outside of cricket, Ramprakash won the fourth series of Strictly Come Dancing in 2006. Since 2020, he has been the director of cricket for Harrow School.

== Background ==
Mark Ramprakash was born in Bushey, Hertfordshire and raised in Harrow is of Indo-Guyanese and English descent. His father, born in British Guiana, was Indo-Guyanese and his mother was English. He attended Gayton High School (now Harrow High School), and then Harrow Weald Sixth Form College.

He became a particularly prolific run scorer when he moved to Surrey in 2001, averaging over 100 runs per innings in two successive seasons (2006 & 2007). He is one of only 25 players in the history of the sport to have scored 100 first-class centuries.

He was elected 26th club president of Middlesex for a two-year term in 2023, succeeding Mike Selvey.

== Career ==
A right-handed batsman, he played for Middlesex at every age level, signing his first professional contract with them at the age of 17. He was selected for England aged 21.

Ramprakash was an English batsman at county level. He maintained a long but intermittent international career.

His first local club was Bessborough Cricket Club in Headstone Lane, Harrow where he showed early talent as a fast bowler before concentrating on his batting. He played his first match for Middlesex aged just 17, scoring 63 not out against Yorkshire, and top-scoring with 71 in his second match against Essex at Chelmsford (he was still a sixth-form student at the time).

He scored his maiden first-class century at Headingley against Yorkshire in 1989, and captained the England U-19 team. He came to national prominence when, at the age of 18, he won the man-of-the match award in the 1988 NatWest Trophy Final after his innings of 56 helped Middlesex beat Worcestershire.

=== "Bloodaxe" ===
During his early days as a professional cricketer, Ramprakash had a reputation as something of a mercurial and stormy character. Nicknamed "Bloodaxe" by Middlesex team-mates for his short temper, Ramprakash's younger days contrasted with the relaxed mellowness of his thirties. However, at times he continued to display the fiery temper that some say prevented him from fully succeeding at international level.

Despite being advised to keep his aggression at bay by teammates, including Graham Gooch and Adam Hollioake he often struggled to control it, resulting in verbal attacks and various dressing room tantrums.

=== Test career ===
Ramprakash was selected for his first Test match for England against the West Indies at Headingley in 1991. This was the same game in which Graeme Hick also made his England Test debut and, like Hick, he struggled to impress, producing a series of disappointing scores in the 20s - albeit usually spending a lot of time compiling them. It is also fair to say that the 1991 West Indies attack was still the best and fastest in the world as well as some pitches in that 1991 series were not straightforward to bat on - especially Headingley and Edgbaston. Ramprakash (like Hick) at least contributed in the field on his Test debut as England recorded their first victory in a home Test match against the West Indies for 22 years. He played all 6 test matches in 1991 but managed a 0 against the lesser pace of Sri Lanka. He did not play any test matches in 1991/92 in New Zealand and was immediately dropped after another 0 on a feather bed of a pitch at Edgbaston against Pakistan. Recalled for the 4th test of that series, he again failed to distinguish himself. However, his consistent heavy scoring in county cricket meant that he was always on the fringes of selection and considered worthy of a further Test opportunity. Like Hick, England's test opponents in 1991 and 1992 represented the very best bowling attacks of their time (Walsh, Ambrose, Marshall, Patterson, Akram, Younis, Mushtaq). While neither Hick nor Ramprakash had any success, they may be considered unlucky not to have settled in against weaker opponents.

He was recalled to the England team for the final Test of the 1993 Ashes series. With Australia already 4–0 up it was a dead rubber, but he produced his first substantial innings for England by scoring 64 to help the team grab a consolation victory. This booked him a place on the subsequent tour of the West Indies. However, another string of low scores meant he was dropped and out of the selectors' plans. Ramprakash was not selected in the touring party for the 1994–95 Ashes series, but was chosen as vice-captain for the England A tour to India. However, an injury to Graeme Hick meant that he was flown out to play in the final Ashes Test, scoring a useful 72 in the final test at Perth, and ironically, in spite of his initial non-selection, finishing top of the England batting averages for the series. He was in and out of the England team over the next few years, never assured of selection but still scoring very heavily for Middlesex.

A breakthrough of sorts came in the 1997–98 Test series against the West Indies when he scored 154 in the fifth Test in Barbados. It was his first Test century and it earned him regular selection for the England team for the next eighteen months. But he was omitted from the 1999 tour of South Africa and thereafter was in and out of the side again. While he scored a number of fifties against various teams at this time (notably Australia), he only added one more century to his tally – 133 against Australia at The Oval in the 2001 Ashes series. He was not picked again after England's tour of New Zealand in March 2002.

During the build-up to the final Ashes Test of 2009, with the series poised at 1–1, Ramprakash, at that point in excellent form for Surrey, was widely touted in the press as a possible choice to improve the struggling England middle order, with a number of pundits promoting his selection. However, Jonathan Trott was selected instead, going on to score a Test century on debut.

=== At Surrey ===
In 2001, thoroughly disillusioned with the organisation at Middlesex, who were by then playing second division-level cricket, he joined London rivals Surrey. His form improved markedly as a result. In the 2003 season, he became the first player to have scored a century against all 18 county teams, and completed the set with a century against his former county Middlesex. Only Carl Hooper and Chris Adams have since achieved this feat.

Ramprakash became the first man to captain both Middlesex and Surrey when he stood in for the injured Mark Butcher at the start of the 2005 English cricket season. Butcher did not recover until the middle of August, and Ramprakash remained captain for most of the season. Ramprakash's move to Surrey seemed to backfire in 2005 when Surrey were relegated after a poor season. However, in their final Championship game, against Middlesex, who were also in danger of relegation themselves, Ramprakash gained consolation by hitting 252, sharing a Surrey record for a fifth-wicket partnership of 318 with Azhar Mahmood as Surrey made 686 for five declared, and duly won by an innings and 39 runs.

In 2006, Ramprakash, relieved of the unwanted burden of captaincy, displayed very good form, making a career-best 292 against Gloucestershire in May, then improving that still further with 301 not out against Northamptonshire in early August. Later that month against Worcestershire he made 196 in the first innings, and in the process passed 2,000 runs in first-class cricket for the summer in only his 20th innings (a record). Ramprakash, the leading run scorer in 2006, was the first man to score 2,000 runs in a season since the Australian Mike Hussey in 2001, and the first Englishman to do it since Ramprakash himself back in 1995. He also became the first man to score over 150 runs in an innings in five consecutive matches. He ended with 2,278 runs at an average of 103.54, only the sixth man to average over one hundred over eight or more completed first-class innings in an English season. Surrey gained promotion back into the first division. His form led some commentators to say that the England selectors should consider him for that winter's Ashes tour: Mike Selvey called him "the best technician of his generation with a good record in trying circumstances in Australia" and said that he should be considered as a possible replacement for Marcus Trescothick. He was not, however, chosen. His 2006 form also won him the Professional Cricketers' Association Player of the Year Award and selection as one of five Wisden Cricketers of the Year.

His fine form continued in 2007, and Ramprakash was once again the most prolific batsman in county cricket. He finished the season with 2,026 first-class runs, including ten centuries, at an average of 101.30, becoming the only man to average over 100 in two consecutive English seasons. His twin hundreds in the final game of the season, against Lancashire, are widely said to have ended Lancashire's hopes of winning the championship. His form and professionalism led to further remarks that he should be recalled to the England side. Ramprakash himself stated that whilst he found this attention flattering, he had more or less abandoned any hope of being recalled to the England team, given the present selection policy targeted towards youth.

In 2008, Ramprakash scored a century in his first innings of the season – his third consecutive first-class century, all against Lancashire – and another (his 99th) two matches later. He finally scored his 100th 100 against Yorkshire at Headingley on 2 August 2008, becoming only the 25th player to reach this mark. It mirrored his very first century, also scored at Headingley. As of March 2024, he is the last cricketer anywhere to achieve 100s in first-class cricket, and with the increasing focus of higher-ability cricketers on limited-over forms of the game, he is likely to remain the last. He then hit 200 not out vs Somerset to get his 101st first-class hundred.

In 2009, there was, yet again, much media speculation that Ramprakash should receive an England call up for the final Test match of the 2009 Ashes series. He averaged 90 for Surrey in 2009.

In 2010, Ramprakash again emerged as county cricket's leading run-getter – albeit in the second division. After 16 matches and 28 innings he ended the season with 1595 runs at an average of 61.34, including 5 hundreds with a highest score of 248.

In 2011, Ramprakash was suspended by Surrey for their CB40 game with Northants after he showed "serious dissent" to umpires in the previous match when he had been given out 'obstructing the field'.

In 2012, Ramprakash was picked to captain MCC in their match against Lancashire opening the 2012 English cricket season.

By the time of his retirement as a cricketer from all forms of the game on 4 July 2012 he had scored 114 hundreds, 16th in the all-time list of first-class century-makers, just three behind Sir Donald Bradman's 117.

In an article in the Daily Telegraph marking his retirement, entitled "Mark Ramprakash: A champion of elegance in helmet and pads", Jim White wrote "...with him will pass into history one of the most beautiful and stylish sights ever seen on a sporting field: Ramprakash taking a long pace forward out of the crease and driving a cricket ball boundary-wards... When he addressed the ball, with everything aligned, everything in the right place, he produced an image which can only be described as exquisite."

Ramprakash was appointed Member of the Order of the British Empire (MBE) in the 2013 New Year Honours for services to sport.

=== Coaching ===
==== 2012–2014 Middlesex ====
In November 2012, he was announced as the batting coach for the England Lions in India. In January 2013, he was appointed as batting coach for Middlesex, on a two-year contract. In November 2014, he was appointed as England's batting coach and served for six years.

In December 2012 he joined Middlesex as their new batting coach and it was reported at the time that he relished the opportunity of working with the players. He returned to Middlesex as a consultant batting coach in 2022, a role he combines with a director of cricket for Harrow School.

==== 2014– England Batting Coach ====
In May 2014 it was reported that Ramprakash was interested in replacing Graham Gooch as England's batting coach and, after some press speculation, his appointment was announced in November 2014.

The Guardian's Mike Selvey suggested that Ramprakash's own indifferent experience at international level will be an asset in coaching England's batsmen, with Nick Knight adding that Ramprakash "can empathise" with England players.

===== 2014 Sri Lanka and Tri-Series =====
The first tour with Ramprakash in charge of batting was the seven match ODI series with Sri Lanka. England lost the series 5–2. England then toured Australia for a tri-series with India and Australia. England went past 300 in the fourth game of the series against Australia. They reached the final after beating India twice, but lost the final to Australia.

===== 2015 World Cup and West Indies =====
England had a poor World Cup campaign and failed to qualify from the group stage. England were bowled out for just 123 in the second game against New Zealand. They posted 303 against Scotland to post their biggest score of the tournament, and then bettered this by scoring 309 against Sri Lanka, although they lost by nine wickets. They were knocked out of the tournament after losing to Bangladesh.

Ramprakash's first Test tour as England batting coach came against West Indies. England scored 399 in the first innings of the first match and 333–7 in the second innings but were unable to force a result as the match ended in a draw. They continued to impress with the bat as they won the next Test, scoring 464 and 144–1. However, they lost the last match as the collapsed in the second innings to 123 all out.

===== 2015 New Zealand =====
England's batsmen played in a more positive manner against New Zealand, with Ben Stokes scoring the fastest ever century at Lord's in England's first Test victory. However, they lost the second Test and drew the series. England were impressive with the bat in the ODI series, posting scores of 350, 365 and 408 in the five-match series. England went on to win the series 3–2. Joe Root and Eoin Morgan particularly impressed. England also won the only T20 match between the sides. Throughout all three series England were praised for their new aggressive brand of cricket.

===== 2015 Australia =====
Ramprakash remained as England batting coach for the Ashes. In the first Test England's batsmen performed well with Joe Root scoring a century as England won the first game. However, in the second Test England collapsed in their second innings and suffered a heavy defeat. England won the third Test by eight wickets, with Ian Bell scoring half centuries in both innings. Root made his second hundred of the series in the fourth Test as England won by an innings and 78 runs. In the final match of the series, England again collapsed, this time to 149 as Australia secured an innings victory. Although England won the series 3–2, Joe Root was the only England batsman to score a century and England only posted over 400 once. England's batting was generally good in the ODI series against Australia, as they went past 300 twice, with James Taylor and Eoin Morgan impressing.

===== 2015 Pakistan =====
England had a mixed performance with the bat in the Tests series against Pakistan. Alastair Cook scored a magnificent 264 in first Test to help England to a draw in a match they nearly won, while Joe Root also passed 70 three times in the series, despite not scoring a century. England suffered a collapse in the final game of the series, making just 156. Jos Buttler, Alex Hales and Jason Roy all made centuries in the ODI series, where England's batting helped them to a 3–1 win. Squad players James Vince and Sam Billings impressed in the T20I series, as England continued to improve their aggressive batting.

===== 2015–16 South Africa =====
England performed well with the bat in the second Test against South Africa, as they made 629–6. Ben Stokes and Jonny Bairstow batted superbly together, putting on 399 in a partnership, as Bairstow made 150 and Stokes 258. England passed 300 five times in the series in their seven innings. England scored 399 in the first ODI, with Jos Buttler scoring a century. Joe Root scored back to back tons in the third and fourth games of the series, and Alex Hales's constancy was also a positive for England. England were less impressive with the bat in their T20Is, with both targets being chased down by South Africa.

===== 2016 T20 World Cup =====
In the second T20I, England chased down South Africa's target of 229, largely thanks to impressive innings from Jason Roy and Joe Root. Jos Buttler also help England post 171 against Sri Lanka to help England reach the final. They eventually finished as runners-up in the competition.

===== 2016 Sri Lanka =====
England's top order batsmen did not perform consistently well against Sri Lanka, but centuries from Jonny Bairstow and Moeen Ali in the first and second Test respectively saw England win the series 2–0, with Alastair Cook and Alex Hales also performing well at the top of the order, as England passed 400 twice in five innings. In the ODI series, Jason Roy scored two centuries and Alex Hales also scored a century as England passed 300 twice to win the series 3–0, which included a record breaking partnership from Hales and Roy in the third ODI. England won the only T20I between the sides, with Jos Buttler impressing with the bat.

===== 2016 Pakistan =====
In the Test series against Pakistan, England failed to pass 300 in the first Test as they suffered a defeat. However, Joe Root scored his highest ever score in the second Test as England posted 589–8 and 173–1 to win by 330 runs. Moeen Ali and Jonny Bairstow performed well with the bat in the final two Tests, and the series finished 2–2. In the ODI series, England started the series in good from with the bat, with Joe Root performing consistently well. In the third ODI, England set a new world record score, making 444–3, and Alex Hales recorded the highest score from an Englishman, while Jos Buttler scored the fastest ever half-century by and Englishman. England won the series 4–1, but lost the only T20I between the two sides after struggling with the bat.

===== 2016 Bangladesh =====
England won the first ODI against Bangladesh after scoring 308, with Ben Stokes scoring a century. Jos Buttler made 50 in the second game, which England lost, but England won the final game with Sam Billings and Ben Duckett making half-centuries. In the Test series, England did not go past 300 once. They won the first Test, with Ben Stokes making 85. However, they lost the second Test after a second-innings collapse, which saw them bowled out for 164 as the series finished 1–1.

===== 2016–17 India =====
In the series against India, England had a mixed time with the bat. Alastair Cook, Joe Root, Ben Stokes and Moeen Ali all scored hundreds in the first Test which ended in a draw. Keaton Jennings scored a hundred on his debut in the fourth Test, and Moeen Ali scored another century in the final game of the series, although both efforts were in a losing cause. England passed 400 three times in the series, but were also dismissed for below 250 four times as they lost the series 4–0.

England batted well in the ODI series against India, posting over 300 in all three matches. Eoin Morgan was the only player to score a century in the series for England, which made in the second ODI. England lost the first two ODIs and although they won the final match, they lost the series 2–1. England batted well in the first T20I, with Eoin Morgan making 51 as England won by seven wickets. After losing the second game, England collapsed to 127 in the third T20I as England lost the series 2–1.

===== 2017 West Indies =====
England performed well with the bat in the series against the West Indies. England made 296–6 in the first match against the West Indies, before making 226–6, which included an unbeaten 90 from Joe Root. In the final game of the series, England made 328, with Alex Hales and Joe Root making tons, as England won the series 3–0.

===== Franchise cricket =====
In July 2019, Ramprakash was appointed as the head coach of the Edinburgh Rocks for the inaugural edition of the Euro T20 Slam cricket tournament.

== Outside cricket ==
In 2006, Ramprakash and Karen Hardy won the BBC's Strictly Come Dancing, beating Matt Dawson, former England rugby player, and Lilia Kopylova in the final. Ramprakash was the second consecutive cricketer to win the show, following former England teammate Darren Gough. In a special edition of Strictly Come Dancing for Sport Relief on 14 March 2008, Ramprakash and partner Kara Tointon were the winners after performing a samba. In 2008, he appeared on a special Strictly Come Dancing episode of The Weakest Link, being the fifth voted off.

Ramprakash was on the books of Watford F.C. as a schoolboy, but gave up the game to concentrate on cricket. He was a P.E. teacher at St. Martin's School, Northwood in 2003, teaching football for a brief period as a consideration for a job after cricket. He is a supporter of Arsenal Football Club and plays for the Arsenal Ex-Pros and Celebrities side.

On 9 March 2008 Ramprakash appeared on the CBBC show Hider in the House, setting up dad Ian Smeeton, with Ian's wife Wendy, two children Will and Pippa Smeeton, and their friend Dougy in Cambridge. He completed all his challenges.

Ramprakash is an ambassador for the British Asian Trust.

Sporting positions
Preceded by Graham Gooch	England Batting Coach; 2014–2020	Succeeded by Graham Thorpe
Preceded by Mike Gatting	Middlesex County Cricket Captain; 1997–1999	Succeeded by Justin Langer
Preceded by Mark O'Neill	Middlesex Batting Coach; 2013–2014	Succeeded by Dave Houghton
Preceded by Dave Houghton	Middlesex Batting Coach; 2022 to date	Succeeded by Incumbent
Preceded by Mike Selvey	Middlesex President; 2023 to date	Succeeded by Incumbent
