= Robin Hobbs =

English cricketer (1942–2024)

Personal information
- Full name: Robin Nicholas Stuart Hobbs
- Born: 8 May 1942; Chippenham, Wiltshire, England
- Died: 17 March 2024 (aged 81)
- Batting: Right-handed
- Bowling: Legbreak

International information
- National side: England
- Test debut: 8 June 1967 v India
- Last Test: 8 July 1971 v Pakistan

Career statistics
Competition	Test	First-class
Matches	7	440
Runs scored	34	4,942
Batting average	6.79	12.11
100s/50s	0/0	2/2
Top score	15*	100
Balls bowled	1,291	62,395
Wickets	12	1,099
Bowling average	40.08	27.09
5 wickets in innings	0	50
10 wickets in match	0	8
Best bowling	3/25	8/63
Catches/stumpings	8/–	295/–
- Source: CricInfo, 7 November 2022

Robin Nicholas Stuart Hobbs (8 May 1942 – 17 March 2024) was an English cricketer who played in seven Tests for England from 1967 to 1971. He played first-class cricket for both Essex and Glamorgan.

Cricket writer, Colin Bateman, remarked, "Hobbs was the last specialist leg-spinner to play for England before Ian Salisbury revived the art in 1992. A good spinner of the ball although he lacked the googly, an inventive batsman and great character, he was an immensely popular cricketer".

== Life and career ==
Leg spinners have proved a rarity in post-war English cricket, thanks in part to the rise of one day cricket, and Hobbs was the last specialist to play for England before the emergence of Ian Salisbury.

Hobbs was born in Chippenham, Wiltshire but after moving to Scotland for a period during the war he grew up in Dagenham in east London. A keen ornithologist, Robin collected tropical birds in an aviary that he built behind his father's shop. This notably included a toucan which he named Terry. He made his debut for Essex in 1961 and for England in 1967, but his well flighted leg breaks failed to discomfort Indian and Pakistani batsmen raised on spin. His batting was unregarded, making his 44-minute century against the touring Australians in 1975, all the more remarkable.

After fourteen years with Essex, Hobbs retired to minor county cricket with Suffolk, before re-emerging four years later after being invited to captain Glamorgan. He was Glamorgan captain in 1979 (a year in which the county didn't win a first class match) then played two more seasons under the captaincy of Malcolm Nash. He returned to Suffolk for the 1982 season, then retired.

Hobbs was the last English leg spin bowler to take 1,000 first-class wickets in his career. In all he took 1,099 scalps, with a best of 8 for 63 at an average of 27.09. An economy rate of 2.86 is testament to his accuracy, while a strike rate of 56.7 ranks with any spinner of his generation.

Hobbs died from complications following bowel surgery on 17 March 2024, at the age of 81.
