= Richard Clinton (cricketer) =

English cricketer (born 1981)

Richard Selvey Clinton (born 1 September 1981) is an English cricketer. He is a left-handed batsman and occasional right-arm medium-pace bowler.

Born in Sidcup, Kent, he made his first-class debut for Essex against Surrey in 2001. He batted at number six in the first innings, making 36, but opened the batting in the second and hit 58 not out. His List A debut a few days later was also personally successful, albeit in a losing cause, as he scored 56 from 57 balls against Durham; as of June 2006, this remains his highest List A score.

Clinton made his maiden first-class hundred (107) against Cambridge UCCE in 2002, but left the county at the end of the season. He moved to Surrey in 2004 to replace Jonathan Batty as opening batsman. For the following season he competed actively for the opening batsman's position with James Benning and was given a new two-year contract at the end of 2004.

Clinton enjoyed a long run in the team in 2005, hitting 811 first-class runs at 31.39 and hitting two centuries and five fifties. However, he made only three appearances in the one-day game, aggregating only 21 runs from these.

He has also made several first-class appearances for Loughborough UCCE, having graduated from Loughborough University in 2006.

His father Grahame had a significant first-class career with Kent and Surrey, while his cousin Paul has played a handful of first-class games for Oxford UCCE.
