= Mohammad Akram (Islamabad cricketer) =

British Pakistani cricketer

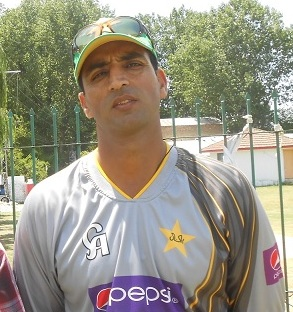
- Mohammad Akram in 2013

Personal information
- Full name: Mohammad Akram Awan
- Born: 10 September 1974 (age 52); Islamabad, Pakistan
- Height: 6 ft 2 in (188 cm)
- Batting: Right-handed
- Bowling: Right-arm fast-medium

International information
- National side: Pakistan
- Test debut (cap 135): 15 September 1995 v Sri Lanka
- Last Test: 27 March 2001 v New Zealand
- ODI debut (cap 101): 29 September 1995 v Sri Lanka
- Last ODI: 5 July 2000 v Sri Lanka

Domestic team information
- Years: Team
- 1992/93–2002/03: Rawalpindi
- 1996/97–2000/01: Allied Bank
- 1997: Northamptonshire
- 2003: Essex
- 2004: Sussex
- 2005–2007: Surrey

Career statistics
Competition	Test	ODI
Matches	9	23
Runs scored	24	14
Batting average	2.66	7.00
100s/50s	0/0	0/0
Top score	10*	7*
Balls bowled	1,477	989
Wickets	17	19
Bowling average	50.52	41.57
5 wickets in innings	1	0
10 wickets in match	0	0
Best bowling	5/28	2/28
Catches/stumpings	4/–	8/–
- Source: ESPNCricinfo, 4 February 2017

Mohammad Akram (Urdu: محمد اکرم; born 10 September 1974) is a former Pakistani cricketer. He is the current Director of Cricket for the Pakistan Super League team Peshawar Zalmi.

== International career ==
He was a right-arm fast-medium bowler who played in 9 Test matches and 23 One Day International matches for Pakistan between 1995–1996 and 2000–2001.

Writing in the context of the 1999 Cricket World Cup, former West Indies fast bowler Colin Croft wrote that Akram, alongside Mohammad Zahid, was "almost as rapid" as Shoaib Akhtar.

== Coaching career ==
On 24 August 2012 the Pakistan Cricket Board (PCB) appointed Mohammad Akram as their bowling coach on a one-year contract. In April 2013, Akram was also involved in a 10-day training camp for top fast bowlers with Wasim Akram at National Stadium Karachi.
