= Scott Newman (cricketer) =

English cricketer

Personal information
- Full name: Scott Alexander Newman
- Born: 3 November 1979 (age 47); Epsom, Surrey, England
- Height: 6 ft 1 in (1.85 m)
- Batting: Left-handed
- Bowling: Right-arm medium
- Role: Batsman

Domestic team information
- Years: Team
- 2002–2009: Surrey
- 2009–2012: Middlesex
- 2009: → Nottinghamshire (loan)
- 2012: → Kent (loan)

Career statistics
Competition	FC	LA	T20
Matches	135	106	65
Runs scored	8,630	2,967	1,237
Batting average	38.18	29.96	22.49
100s/50s	16/51	4/17	0/5
Top score	219	177	81*
Balls bowled	120	0	0
Wickets	0	–	–
Bowling average	–	–	–
5 wickets in innings	–	–	–
10 wickets in match	–	–	–
Best bowling	–	–	–
Catches/stumpings	99/–	25/–	20/–
- Source: Cricinfo, 1 April 2013

Scott Alexander Newman (born 3 November 1979) is an English former professional cricketer who played first-class cricket between 2002 and 2009.

Newman was born at Epsom in Surrey and educated at Trinity School of John Whitgift in Croydon, Coulsdon College and Brighton University.

An opening batsman, his first-class debut for Surrey against Hampshire in 2002 was sealed with an innings of 99, followed by an innings of 183 in the next match against Leicestershire. He was selected in 2003/04 to attend the ECB national academy and toured subsequently to India]

In May 2005, he made history as the first Surrey player to hit consecutive innings of a century and a double century in the same game, against Glamorgan.

In 2009, he was dropped from the Surrey squad mid-way through the season and spent time on loan at Nottinghamshire before formally leaving Surrey at the end of the season to join traditional rivals Middlesex. There were reports that Newman's departure from Surrey was influenced by management's disappointment with his attitude on and off the pitch. This followed an altercation with the umpires in a match against Middlesex earlier that season. His stint with Nottinghamshire was also marked by a dispute with the umpires during a first-class match.

On 12 March 2012 Newman joined Kent on loan for the first two months of the season. He played four matches for Kent with his highest score being 89 against Oxford MCCU.

In 2017 he set up the Scott Newman Academy to coach junior players, following brief spells running cricket coaching programmes in North Middlesex and West Hertfordshire.
