= Ali Brown =

English cricketer (born 1970)

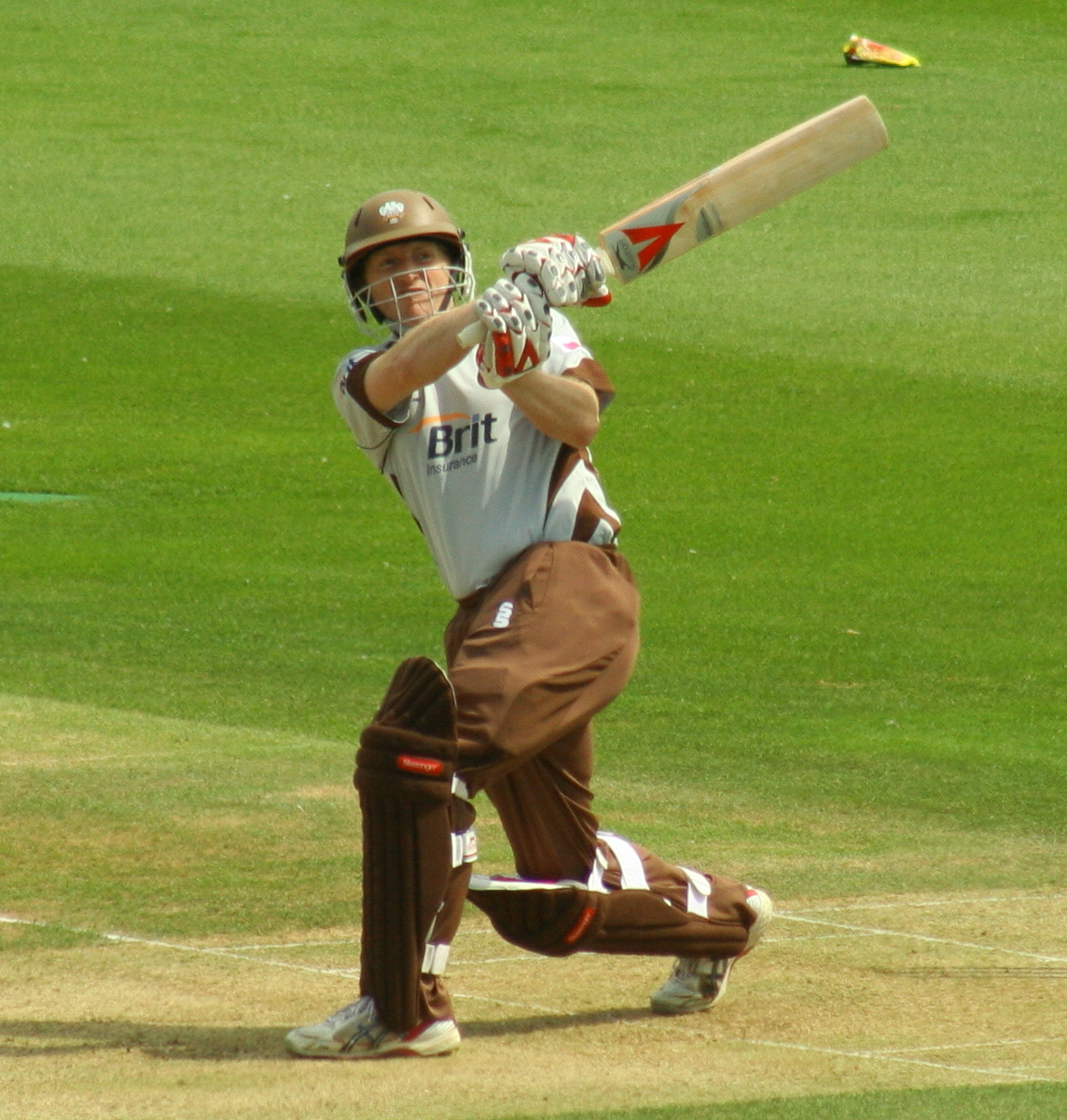

Personal information
- Full name: Alistair Duncan Brown
- Born: 11 February 1970 (age 56); Beckenham, Bromley, Greater London
- Nickname: Lordy
- Height: 5 ft 10 in (1.78 m)
- Batting: Right-handed
- Bowling: Right-arm Off break
- Role: Batsman

International information
- National side: England
- ODI debut (cap 135): 23 May 1996 v India
- Last ODI: 21 June 2001 v Australia

Domestic team information
- Years: Team
- 1990–2008: Surrey (squad no. 5)
- 2009–2011: Nottinghamshire (squad no. 3)

Career statistics
Competition	ODIs	FC	LA	T20
Matches	16	285	405	79
Runs scored	354	16,898	11,262	1,758
Batting average	22.12	42.67	30.68	22.83
100s/50s	1/1	47/75	19/50	0/12
Top score	118	295*	268	83
Balls bowled	6	1417	520	2
Wickets	0	6	14	0
Bowling average	–	129.16	40.07	–
5 wickets in innings	–	0	0	–
10 wickets in match	–	0	0	–
Best bowling	–	3/25	3/39	–
Catches/stumpings	6/–	278/1	131/0	41/0
- Source: CricketArchive, 24 August 2014

Alistair Duncan Brown (born 11 February 1970) is a former English cricketer who played for Surrey County Cricket Club, before moving to Nottinghamshire for the 2009 season. He was nicknamed "Lordy", in allusion to Ted Dexter (who was known as "Lord Ted") because of his aggressively big-hitting, confident batting style. He was a right-hand bat and occasional right-arm off-break bowler, who made 16 One Day International appearances for England between 1996 and 2001, with a best of 118.

Brown scored over 15,000 runs in first-class cricket following his debut in 1992. An equally prolific one day player with over 11,000 runs, he also set the then world record List A score of 268 in 2002, a record that stood for two decades. Brown is the first player in the history of List A cricket to make two double centuries.

== Early career ==
Brown attended Caterham School in Surrey, where he won the Cricket Society's Wetherall Award for the most promising all rounder in school cricket in 1986, and his early promise led to second XI games for Surrey in 1988. He made his first-class debut in 1992 and was awarded his County Cap in 1994. He shared the Walter Lawrence trophy (with Carl Hooper) in 1998 for scoring the season's fastest first-class century in just 72 balls against Northamptonshire at the Oval including 10 fours and 6 sixes.

== County cricket ==
Brown scored 268 against Glamorgan at the Oval in the 4th round of the 2002 Cheltenham & Gloucester Trophy, a then world record individual high score in all one-day cricket. His innings took 160 balls and included 30 fours and 12 sixes. Surrey's final total of 438/5 in 50 overs was almost matched by Glamorgan who scored 429 all out and stood as the highest scoring one day match in the history of county cricket for over a decade. Brown's innings broke Graeme Pollock's 27-year-old record of 222, and stood until Narayan Jagadeesan broke it by scoring 277 in 2022. His partnership of 286 with Ian Ward was the Surrey record for any wicket in one day cricket until broken by the 294 added by Brown this time with James Benning in 2007 against Gloucestershire in which Brown scored 176 off just 97 balls. The '268 Bar' at the Oval cricket ground is named after Brown's innings.

Alistair Brown mostly opened for Surrey in one day cricket, as opposed to his usual Championship batting position of number 5. He holds the record for the highest score ever made in the Sunday League, amassing 203 for Surrey v Hampshire at the Woodbridge Road ground in Guildford in 1997 in a 40 overs a side match. He scored his first 100 off 56 balls, made 150 off 84 and 200 from 118 with 19 fours and 11 sixes. In the final of the inaugural Twenty/20 cup at Trent Bridge in 2003 Brown scored a match winning innings of 55* from just 34 balls in Surrey's victory over Warwickshire. In the 2004 final at Edgbaston he hit 64 from 41 balls in vain as Surrey lost to Leicestershire. He hit 30 sixes in one day cricket in 2006, second only to Cameron White.

He started the 2007 season with a century in just 50 balls against Gloucestershire at the Oval in the Friends Provident competition (50 overs a side), the 7th quickest century in English one day cricket and the 12th fastest of all time. He set a new record partnership of 294, in less than 34 overs, for any wicket in one day cricket for Surrey with James Benning, beating his own record of 289 with Ian Ward. He passed 150 runs in just 81 balls and scored 176 in 97 balls, with 8 sixes and 20 fours before missing a reverse sweep. The scorer of 19 one day centuries, he is one of the few contemporary English batsmen to have scored 10,000 runs in list A one-day cricket.

Up to the start of the 2008 English season Brown had scored 14,705 runs in first-class cricket at an average of 43.50 with 44 centuries and a highest score of 295 not out against Leicestershire at Oakham School in 2000. Ali Brown has taken 2 first-class wickets with his off spin, taken 236 catches, mostly at slip, and is responsible for one first-class stumping as a substitute wicket-keeper. In 2004, with a century against Lancashire, he completed the feat of scoring a first-class century against every other English county.

He played in the Surrey team that won the County Championship in 1999, 2000 and 2002 as well the English domestic one day league in 1996 and 2003 and the Benson and Hedges Cup in 1997 and 2001. He was a member of the side which won the County Championship Division 2 title in 2006 and was rewarded with another contract, being described by coach Alan Butcher as 'a great servant of the club'. Matthew Reed records that "for sheer entertainment value, there are very, very few to match him in the county game."

== Move to Nottinghamshire ==
Brown was released by Surrey at the end of the 2008 season. Surrey executives remarked that "Alistair Brown has been a great servant of Surrey and played a leading role during his successful career with us", and "Brown has been one of the most prodigious run makers for Surrey in recent years... His record in one-day cricket is almost unparalleled and the club owe him a great debt of thanks for all that he has achieved."

He signed a two-year contract with Nottinghamshire covering the 2009 and 2010 seasons. In 2010 the side won the County Championship, to add to the three Championships he had won with Surrey in 1999, 2000 and 2002. After continuing with Nottinghamshire for the 2011 season, in August he announced his intention to retire as a player at the end of the season.

In November 2011 he returned to Surrey as second team coach. He left the club at the end of the 2016 season.

== International career ==
Although he played in 16 One Day Internationals, scoring 118 against India in just his 3rd match in 1996 and hitting a 31-ball 50 against South Africa in 1998 – the fastest in the history of the Texaco Trophy – he never played in a Test match. His 16,898 first-class runs at 42.67, and more than 11,000 List A runs, make him one of the most successful English batsmen never to have won a test cap. Lawrence Booth described Brown as one of the best present-day (at the time of writing) English cricketers not to have played Test cricket.

== Post-playing retirement ==
He now works as a cricket specialist at Trinity School in Shirley. He has helped lead them to national cup trophies.

Brown has appeared as a regular pundit on Racing Post Greyhound TV.
