= Grahame Clinton =

English cricketer

Personal information
- Full name: Grahame Selvey Clinton
- Born: 5 May 1953 (age 73); Sidcup, Kent
- Batting: Left-handed
- Bowling: Right-arm medium
- Role: Batsman

Domestic team information
- Years: Team
- 1974–1978: Kent
- 1979–1990: Surrey
- 1979/80: Zimbabwe-Rhodesia

Career statistics
Competition	First-class	List A
Matches	270	185
Runs scored	13,118	5,264
Batting average	33.04	33.74
100s/50s	20/73	4/33
Top score	192	146
Balls bowled	160	32
Wickets	4	0
Bowling average	50.25	–
5 wickets in innings	0	–
10 wickets in match	0	–
Best bowling	2/8	–
Catches/stumpings	96/–	34/–
- Source: CricInfo, 17 April 2017

Grahame Selvey Clinton (born 5 May 1953) is a former English professional cricketer. He was an opening batsman who played for Kent County Cricket Club from 1974 to 1978 and for Surrey County Cricket Club from 1979 to 1990.

== Early life ==
Clinton was born at Sidcup in Kent in 1953. He was educated at Chislehurst and Sidcup Grammar School. He played cricket for the English Schools Cricket Association and England Young Cricketers from 1970 to 1972.

== Cricket career ==
Clinton first played for Kent's Second XI in 1971 and made his first-class cricket debut for the county against the touring Pakistanis at Canterbury in July 1974. He did not play again for the county until 1976 and, with the exception of 1977 when he made 18 first-class appearances, his opportunities for Kent were limited in a team which won the 1978 County Championship and Benson & Hedges Cup and shared the 1977 title. He joined Surrey prior to the 1979 season having played 32 first-class and 10 List A matches for Kent.

At Surrey he immediately formed a successful opening partnership with Alan Butcher which lasted until the 1986 season when Butcher suffered a loss of form and was dropped down the order and then omitted from the team before being released by Surrey at the end of the season. Their first wicket stands included 277 against Yorkshire in 1984, when Clinton made his highest score of 192, and 266 against Cambridge University in 1980. Butcher and Clinton shared 19 century opening partnerships for Surrey. He opened the batting with Butcher in Surrey's match against Essex at Chelmsford in May 1983 when Surrey were bowled out for 14 runs, the lowest score in English first-class cricket since 1907 and Surrey's lowest first-class score ever. Clinton top-scored with six runs in the first innings before scoring 65 not out as Surrey batted through their second innings to draw the match.

With all partners, Clinton took part in 31 century opening partnerships, and 73 century stands when all wickets are considered. He scored over a thousand runs in his first season with Surrey, a feat he achieved on six other occasions: 1980, 1981, 1985, 1986, 1988 and 1990. His best seasons, when he averaged in the 40s, were 1984, 1985, 1988 and 1990, although he had poor seasons in 1983 and 1989, when his average fell below 25.

Clinton was still scoring well during his final season, with 1,292 runs at 46.14 in 1990. He and Darren Bicknell added 321 for the first wicket against Northamptonshire. His final first-class match was against his old county of Kent at Canterbury. He played 4 matches for Zimbabwe-Rhodesia in the 1979/80 Currie Cup.

Clinton was by nature a defensive batsman. The Surrey coach Micky Stewart said that he "formed the backbone of the innings, the platform from which our strokemakers can play." He was famously injury-prone, being taken to hospital in fifteen of the then seventeen first-class counties.

== Coaching career and family ==
After he retired Clinton became the coach of Surrey's Second XI in 1992, leading the team to the Second XI Championship in that year. He coached Surrey's First XI from 1994 to 1995 but left the county by mutual consent after "two ... seasons of unfulfilled promise". He was also a coach at Kent and, as of 2017, is master-in-charge of cricket at Colfe's School in Greenwich.

His son, Richard Clinton, played for Essex, Loughborough UCCE and Surrey where he sometimes appeared in the same team as Mark Butcher, the son of Grahame Clinton's old opening partner.
