= Martin Bicknell =

English cricketer

Personal information
- Full name: Martin Paul Bicknell
- Born: 14 January 1969 (age 57); Guildford, Surrey, England
- Nickname: Bickers
- Height: 193 cm (6 ft 4 in)
- Batting: Right-handed
- Bowling: Right-arm fast-medium
- Role: Bowler

International information
- National side: England
- Test debut (cap 565): 22 July 1993 v Australia
- Last Test: 8 September 2003 v South Africa
- ODI debut (cap 110): 7 December 1990 v New Zealand
- Last ODI: 13 February 1991 v New Zealand

Career statistics
Competition	Test	ODI	FC	LA
Matches	4	7	292	332
Runs scored	45	96	6,740	1,589
Batting average	6.42	24.00	24.87	15.57
100s/50s	0/0	0/0	3/26	0/2
Top score	15	31*	141	66*
Balls bowled	1,080	413	55,420	16,167
Wickets	14	13	1,061	429
Bowling average	38.78	26.69	25.06	25.10
5 wickets in innings	0	0	44	3
10 wickets in match	0	0	4	0
Best bowling	4/84	3/55	9/45	7/30
Catches/stumpings	2/–	2/–	103/–	78/–
- Source: , 1 January 2006

Martin Paul Bicknell (born 14 January 1969) is a former English cricketer. He played in four Test matches, with the last two, against South Africa in 2003, coming ten years after the first two in the 1993 Ashes series. England had played 114 matches between his appearances, a record. He was considered most unlucky to be constantly overlooked for selection in home Test matches when consistently proving himself a prolific wicket taker in county cricket.

He was a very effective medium-fast swing and seam bowler who reached one thousand first-class wickets for his county, Surrey, in 2005, having achieved the milestone in all first-class matches the previous year. In 2000 he had match figures of 16-119 for Surrey against Leicestershire at Guildford, the second best match figures ever returned for the county. His figures in the second innings were 9-47. His best innings figures were 9-45, against Cambridge University at The Oval in 1988.

He was also an increasingly useful tail-end batsman, verging on all-rounder status, with three first-class centuries to his name and an average of 24.87.

His brother Darren Bicknell was a fine opening batsman in county cricket, playing with Surrey and finishing his career with Nottinghamshire.

Bicknell lives in Churt, Farnham, He is married to Sarah, and has four children: Ellie, Charlotte, Mia-May and Millie-Coco.

Bicknell was a Wisden Cricketer of the Year in 2001.

He made his first-class debut in 1986. Having initially intended to cease playing at the end of the 2006 season, he was struck by a series of niggling injuries which forced him to announce an earlier retirement from first-class cricket on 9 August 2006, moving on to take up a post at Charterhouse School as the Master in Charge of Cricket.

His autobiography, Bickers. was published in 2008.
