= Chris Taylor (cricketer, born 1981) =

English cricketer

Christopher Robert Taylor (born 21 February 1981, Leeds, Yorkshire, England) is an English former first-class cricketer. He is a right-handed batsman and a right-arm medium-fast bowler.

== Life and career ==
Taylor was present at Yorkshire County Cricket Club for eight seasons, and, although his first-team playing time was limited, he saw plenty of action in the Second XI. Taylor broke through into the first team and made his debut in the County Championship winning season of 2001. His opportunities were limited, although he impressed in the first XI, most notably in 2004, but soon found himself back in the Second XI after he was replaced by Joe Sayers and Andrew Gale.

In November 2006, Taylor signed for Derbyshire on a two-year contract, and, within a month of the start of the season, Taylor had hit two centuries, one against Glamorgan and the other against his old club, Yorkshire, in a match winning innings at Headingley. Taylor became the first Derbyshire cricketer in their history to score a century on his first-class and one day debuts for the club. At the end of his first season at Derbyshire, Taylor had made five first-class centuries, was named one day player of the year, and finished second in the National One Day averages second to Darren Lehmann.

Despite an improved further two-year contract, Taylor asked to be released from Derbyshire at the end of the 2007 season, leaving the club with immediate effect. Tom Sears, the county's chief executive, called his decision "very disappointing".

On 17 September 2007, he was re-signed by Yorkshire on a three-year contract. Taylor was hampered with a hamstring injury for most of his first season, but on his first appearance of the season he struck a six off the last ball to win the Twenty20 match against Leicestershire.

Despite consistent performances in Yorkshire's Second XI, Taylor found no opportunity in the first team. At the end of the 2009 season, Taylor decided to call time on his career in a mutual decision with Yorkshire. He finished his career with five first-class centuries to his name, a County Championship winners medal, and scoring twenty five Second XI hundreds.

Taylor with his business partner, Andrew Gale, ran the Pro Coach Cricket Academy across the UK, providing expert cricket coaching for young cricketers by current and former professional cricketers. However in 2014 Taylor sold his stake in the company to focus on other business ventures.

Taylor currently plays for Lightcliffe C.C. In the 2010 season, he finished top of the batting averages for the Bradford Cricket League for the fourth time. He also became the quickest player to a 1,000 league runs in the history of the Bradford League taking only fourteen innings. He finished the season with 1,436 runs at an average of 95.70, to become the highest scorer in the history of Lightcliffe C.C. surpassing the Indian Test player, Mohammed Kaif.

In 2011, Taylor, set up the All Rounder Cricket Store, opposite the Headingley ground. All Rounder has rapidly grown to become one of the leading cricket and hockey equipment retailers in the UK. In 2015 All Rounder Cricket opened its second store based in Sheffield.
