= James Benning (cricketer) =

English cricketer (born 1983)

Personal information
- Full name: James Graham Edward Benning
- Born: 4 May 1983 (age 43); Mill Hill, London, England
- Height: 5 ft 11 in (1.80 m)
- Batting: Right-handed
- Bowling: Right-arm medium pace

Domestic team information
- Years: Team
- 2009–2010: Leicestershire
- 2003–2009: Surrey (squad no. 3)

Career statistics
Competition	FC	LA	T20
Matches	36	77	50
Runs scored	1642	2465	1032
Batting average	31.57	33.76	22.43
100s/50s	4/7	3/15	–/7
Top score	128	189*	88
Balls bowled	1287	968	42
Wickets	14	31	2
Bowling average	70.71	35.06	28.50
5 wickets in innings	–	–	–
10 wickets in match	–	–	–
Best bowling	3/57	4/43	1/7
Catches/stumpings	14/–	26/–	15/–
- Source: Cricinfo, 27 July 2009

James Benning (born 4 May 1983 in Mill Hill, London) is an English cricketer who played for Leicestershire County Cricket Club and Surrey. He is a right-hand bat and right-arm medium pace bowler. Benning played for the minor county team, Buckinghamshire, in 2001, in one Under-19 "Test" for England in 2002 and joined Surrey in 2003.

Benning won the NBC Denis Compton Award for young players in 2003.

James, who used to attend Caterham School, shared in a one-day world record 496-4 (with Surrey) in 2007. He and Ali Brown, also a former Caterham School pupil, put on 296 opening for Surrey, with Benning going on to make 152.

He finished the 2005/06 domestic one day campaign with the highest average of any county player. After leaving Surrey he joined Leicestershire, but was released after the 2010 season.
