= Nayan Doshi =

English cricketer (born 1978)

Personal information
- Full name: Nayan Dilip Doshi
- Born: 6 October 1978 (age 48); Nottingham, Nottinghamshire, England
- Batting: Right-handed
- Bowling: Slow left-arm orthodox
- Relatives: Dilip Doshi (father)

Domestic team information
- Years: Team
- 2001: Buckinghamshire
- 2001/02–2013/14: Saurashtra
- 2004–2007: Surrey
- 2008: Derbyshire
- 2010: Royal Challengers Bangalore
- 2011: Rajasthan Royals

Career statistics
Competition	FC	LA	T20
Matches	70	74	52
Runs scored	567	204	10
Batting average	9.00	8.16	2.00
100s/50s	–/–	–/–	–/–
Top score	37	38*	5
Balls bowled	12,252	3,145	1,008
Wickets	166	64	68
Bowling average	40.36	44.04	16.80
5 wickets in innings	6	1	–
10 wickets in match	3	–	–
Best bowling	7/110	5/30	4/22
Catches/stumpings	14/–	21/–	12/–
- Source: ESPNcricinfo, 4 May 2022

Nayan Dilip Doshi (born 6 October 1978, Nottingham) is an English cricketer. He is the son of Dilip Doshi, who is a former Indian Test bowler. Doshi, a left arm spin bowler, first played for Surrey in June 2004, after already playing for the Indian side Saurashtra in the Ranji Trophy.

At the end of the 2006 cricket season, Doshi signed a two-year contract with Surrey, which was to end after the 2008 season. On 19 July 2007, Surrey announced that this contract had been terminated at Doshi's request.

Doshi then signed a short-term deal with Warwickshire until the end of the 2007 season. Doshi was due to make his debut in Warwickshire's County Championship match against Sussex on 8 August that year. However, he was unable to do so owing to confusion surrounding the registration process.

Doshi was the first bowler in the Twenty20 Cup to take a hat-trick and still finish on the losing side. Nayan Doshi became the oldest player in IPL auction 2021 after Pravin Tambe, who was the oldest at the IPL auction 2020.
