= Kent County Cricket Club in 2012 =

Kent County Cricket Club
2012 season
- Coach: (Cricket West Indies) Jimmy Adams
- Captain: (England) Rob Key
- Overseas player: (Cricket West Indies) Brendan Nash
- Ground(s): St Lawrence Ground, Canterbury; Nevill Ground, Tunbridge Wells; County Ground, Beckenham
- County Championship: 3rd, Division Two
- Clydesdale Bank 40: 3rd, Group C
- Friends Life t20: 4th, South Group
- Most runs: FC: SA Northeast (969); LA: SW Billings (315); T20: SW Billings (216)
- Most wickets: FC: CE Shreck (58); LA: DI Stevens (20); T20: AJ Ball (12)
- Most catches: FC: JC Tredwell (13); LA: DI Stevens (7); JC Tredwell (7); T20: RWT Key (5)
- Most wicket-keeping dismissals: FC: GO Jones (52); LA: GO Jones (16); T20: GO Jones (10)

In 2012, Kent County Cricket Club competed in Division Two of the County Championship, Group C of the 40-over Clydesdale Bank 40 and the South Group of the Friends Life t20. Kent also hosted a first-class match at the St Lawrence Ground against the touring South Africans. At the start of the season, Kent played a three-day MCC Universities match at Oxford MCCU, but this match did not have first-class status. It was the first season in charge for new head coach Jimmy Adams after the departure of Paul Farbrace who had been the club's Director of Cricket for two seasons. The club captain was former England batsman Rob Key who had been club captain since 2006. Brendan Nash joined Kent as their overseas player.

Kent finished third of nine in Division Two of the County Championship, narrowly missing out on promotion to Division One. The county performed well in the Clydesdale Bank 40, winning 7 out of 9 completed matches, but missed out on qualification for the knockout stages despite finishing level on points with group runners-up Warwickshire. A surprise loss to the Unicorns and a no result against the same opposition when rain forced an abandonment after Kent had restricted their opponents to just 177/8 ultimately proved costly, and Kent missed out on a semi-final appearance after losing their final match against Sussex. The Friends Life t20 campaign was disappointing for Kent, with the team winning just 4 out of 10 matches and finishing in 4th place (out of 6) in the South Group.

At international level, James Tredwell played One Day Internationals for England during the English summer, playing in a single match against Australia and later three matches against South Africa. Tredwell also played two First Class matches for the England Lions against Australia A. Matt Coles also played in one of these matches for the England Lions.

== Squad ==
Kent signed five players ahead of the 2012 season. Fast bowler Charlie Shreck joined from Nottinghamshire in September 2011. Veteran batsman Mike Powell signed for the county after spending 15 seasons with Glamorgan in November. Durham all-rounder Ben Harmison was the third new signing before the end of 2011 when he joined Kent in December. Kent signed Australian-born West Indian batsman Brendan Nash as their overseas player for 2012 in March. The other addition to the squad saw batsman Scott Newman join on loan for the first two months of the season from Middlesex as cover for Daniel Bell-Drummond who was on England Under-19 duty. Newman had dropped down the pecking order at Middlesex after the arrival of Joe Denly from Kent after the end of the 2011 season. Denly had made his debut for Kent in 2004. In addition to Denly, Martin van Jaarsveld had also left the county after the 2011 season. He had been with Kent since 2005 and initially agreed to join Leicestershire, but later cancelled the deal and instead announced his retirement from county cricket in November 2011, citing fatigue. Simon Cook, who had also joined the county in 2005, retired from playing towards the end of the 2012 season.

=== Squad list ===
- Ages given as of the first day of the County Championship season, 5 April 2012.

Name	Nationality	Birth date	Batting style	Bowling style	Notes
Batsmen
Daniel Bell-Drummond	England	3 August 1993 (aged 18)	Right-handed	Right arm medium	
Alex Blake	England	25 January 1989 (aged 23)	Left-handed	Right arm medium-fast	
Fabian Cowdrey	England	30 January 1993 (aged 19)	Right-handed	Slow left-arm orthodox	
Rob Key	England	12 May 1979 (aged 32)	Right-handed	Right arm off break	Club captain
Brendan Nash	Jamaica	14 December 1977 (aged 34)	Left-handed	Left arm medium	Overseas player
Scott Newman	England	3 November 1979 (aged 32)	Left-handed	Right arm medium	On loan from Middlesex
Sam Northeast	England	16 October 1989 (aged 22)	Right-handed	Right arm off break	
Chris Piesley	England	12 February 1992 (aged 20)	Left-handed	Right arm off break	
Mike Powell	Wales	3 February 1977 (aged 35)	Right-handed	Right arm off break	
All-rounders
Azhar Mahmood	Pakistan	28 February 1975 (aged 37)	Right-handed	Right arm fast-medium	British citizen
Adam Ball	England	1 March 1993 (aged 19)	Right-handed	Left arm fast-medium	
Matt Coles	England	26 May 1990 (aged 21)	Left-handed	Right arm fast-medium	
Ben Harmison	England	9 January 1986 (aged 26)	Left-handed	Right arm medium-fast	
Darren Stevens	England	30 April 1976 (aged 35)	Right-handed	Right arm medium	
Wicket-keepers
Sam Billings	England	15 June 1991 (aged 20)	Right-handed	—	
Geraint Jones	England	14 July 1979 (aged 32)	Right-handed	—	
Bowlers
Simon Cook	England	15 January 1977 (aged 35)	Right-handed	Right arm medium-fast	
Mark Davies	England	4 October 1980 (aged 31)	Right-handed	Right arm medium	
Ben Kemp	England	26 May 1993 (aged 18)	Right-handed	Right arm fast-medium	
Adam Riley	England	23 March 1992 (aged 20)	Right-handed	Right arm off break	
Ashley Shaw	England	15 April 1991 (aged 20)	Right-handed	Left arm fast-medium	
Charlie Shreck	England	6 January 1978 (aged 34)	Right-handed	Right arm fast-medium	
Ivan Thomas	England	25 September 1991 (aged 20)	Right-handed	Right arm medium-fast	
James Tredwell	England	27 February 1982 (aged 30)	Left-handed	Right arm off break	

== County Championship ==
=== Division Two ===
Team	Pld	W	L	T	D	A	Bat	Bowl	Ded	Pts
Derbyshire (C)	16	6	2	0	8	0	31	43	0.0	194
Yorkshire (P)	16	5	0	0	11	0	41	40	0.0	194
Kent	16	4	3	0	9	0	39	40	0.0	170
Hampshire	16	4	5	0	7	0	28	40	0.0	153
Essex	16	3	3	0	10	0	27	40	0.0	145
Glamorgan	16	3	6	0	6	1	28	35	1.0	131
Leicestershire	16	3	3	0	10	0	24	33	5.0	130
Northamptonshire	16	2	5	0	9	0	37	34	0.0	130
Gloucestershire	16	3	6	0	6	1	22	35	0.0	126
Source: Cricinfo

=== Matches ===
5–8 April	Kent	v	(H) Yorkshire	Match drawn
Scorecard	537/9d (148.3 overs); MT Coles 103* (111); Ajmal Shahzad 3/86 (31 overs)		364 (101.1 overs); JM Bairstow 107 (147); CE Shreck 4/90 (26.1 overs)	Headingley, Leeds; Umpires: MA Eggleston and NA Mallender
Scorecard			146/4 (53 overs) (f/o); JE Root 76 (118); CE Shreck 2/22 (10 overs)	Headingley, Leeds; Umpires: MA Eggleston and NA Mallender
Kent won the toss and elected to bat; Points: Yorkshire 9, Kent 10

12–14 April	(H) Northamptonshire	v	Kent	Kent won by an innings and 120 runs
Scorecard	132 (58.1 overs); AG Wakely 33 (86); MT Coles 3/32 (14.1 overs)		368 (112.5 overs); MJ Powell 128* (227); JA Brooks 5/98 (27.5 overs)	County Ground, Northampton; Umpires: PK Baldwin and RK Illingworth
Scorecard	116 (55.3 overs); DJG Sales 42 (65); MT Coles 6/51 (16.3 overs)			County Ground, Northampton; Umpires: PK Baldwin and RK Illingworth
Northamptonshire won the toss and elected to bat; Points: Northamptonshire 2, Kent 23

19–22 April	Gloucestershire	v	(H) Kent	Match drawn
Scorecard	255 (96.2 overs); WRS Gidman 56 (129); M Davies 4/43 (25 overs)		150 (54.5 overs); DI Stevens 54 (90); WRS Gidman 5/43 (16.3 overs)	St Lawrence Ground, Canterbury; Umpires: SA Garratt and PJ Hartley
Scorecard	257/7d (79 overs); HJH Marshall 74 (115); MT Coles 3/55 (18 overs)		94/2 (38.1 overs); RWT Key 32* (100); EGC Young 1/18 (12 overs)	St Lawrence Ground, Canterbury; Umpires: SA Garratt and PJ Hartley
Kent won the toss and elected to field; Points: Kent 6, Gloucestershire 8

26–29 April	Yorkshire	v	(H) Kent	Match drawn
Scorecard	247 (92.3 overs); GS Ballance 38 (105); MT Coles 4/70 (23.3 overs)		350/9 (105.5 overs); BP Nash 123* (214); TT Bresnan 3/89 (29.5 overs)	St Lawrence Ground, Canterbury; Umpires: TE Jesty and P Willey
Kent won the toss and elected to field; No play on day 4; Points: Kent 10, Yorkshire 7

9–12 May	Kent	v	(H) Essex	Match drawn
Scorecard	225 (68.1 overs); DI Stevens 119 (170); CM Willoughby 5/70 (20 overs)		181 (82.4 overs); ML Pettini 92 (164); M Davies 4/20 (24.4 overs)	County Ground, Chelmsford; Umpires: SJ O'Shaughnessy and G Sharp
Scorecard	92/2d (28 overs); RWT Key 40* (69); T Westley 1/29 (9 overs)			County Ground, Chelmsford; Umpires: SJ O'Shaughnessy and G Sharp
Essex won the toss and elected to field; Points: Essex 6, Kent 7

16–19 May	Northamptonshire	v	(H) Kent	Match drawn
Scorecard	418 (144.3 overs); DJG Sales 140 (241); DI Stevens 3/63 (24.3 overs)		280/6d (111 overs); MJ Powell 61 (148); AJ Hall 3/39 (19 overs)	St Lawrence Ground, Canterbury; Umpires: NGB Cook and NGC Cowley
Scorecard	123/0d (36 overs); JD Middlebrook 64* (104); 110/1 (43 overs)		RWT Key 54* (120); JD Middlebrook 1/19 (10 overs)	St Lawrence Ground, Canterbury; Umpires: NGB Cook and NGC Cowley
Northamptonshire won the toss and elected to bat; Points: Kent 6, Northamptonshire 7

23–25 May	Leicestershire	v	(H) Kent	Kent won by an innings and 279 runs
Scorecard	141 (53.5 overs); WA White 38 (55); MT Coles 5/41 (11 overs)		533 (172.4 overs); MJ Powell 134 (282); CW Henderson 5/116 (50.4 overs)	St Lawrence Ground, Canterbury; Umpires: I Dawood and TE Jesty
Scorecard	113 (46 overs); NL Buck 27 (53); DI Stevens 4/24 (13 overs)			St Lawrence Ground, Canterbury; Umpires: I Dawood and TE Jesty
Leicestershire won the toss and elected to bat; Points: Kent 22, Leicestershire 1

6–9 June	Hampshire	v	(H) Kent	Match drawn
Scorecard	303/8d (101.5 overs); LA Dawson 134* (286); M Davies 2/40 (23 overs)		Innings forfeited	Nevill Ground, Tunbridge Wells; Umpires: SC Gale and RK Illingworth
Scorecard	Innings forfeited		220/6 (68 overs); SA Northeast 79 (145); AD Mascarenhas 2/45 (20 overs)	Nevill Ground, Tunbridge Wells; Umpires: SC Gale and RK Illingworth
Kent won the toss and elected to field; Only 15.1, 18.3 and 44.2 overs were bowled on days 1, 2 and 3, respectively, due to rain; Points: Kent 5, Hampshire 6

16–19 July	Kent (H)	v	Glamorgan	Match drawn
Scorecard	456/9d (119 overs); DI Stevens 123 (152); JAR Harris 5/118 (33 overs)		389 (112.1 overs); MA Wallace 111 (197); DI Stevens 4/77 (26.1 overs)	St Lawrence Ground, Canterbury; Umpires: SC Gale and DJ Millns
Scorecard	168/2 (58.1 overs); SA Northeast 101* (159); JC Glover 2/16 (9 overs)			St Lawrence Ground, Canterbury; Umpires: SC Gale and DJ Millns
Kent won the toss and elected to bat; Points: Kent 11, Glamorgan 9

27–30 July	Hampshire (H)	v	Kent	Match drawn
Scorecard	292 (96.2 overs); JHK Adams 91 (191); M Davies 3/36 (21.2 overs)		467 (130.4 overs); SA Northeast 140 (257); JA Tomlinson 4/94 (28 overs)	The Rose Bowl, Southampton; Umpires: PJ Hartley and SJ O'Shaughnessy
Scorecard	186/9 (91 overs); JHK Adams 85* (255); JC Tredwell 3/62 (33 overs)			The Rose Bowl, Southampton; Umpires: PJ Hartley and SJ O'Shaughnessy
Hampshire won the toss and elected to bat; Points: Hampshire 7, Kent 10

2–5 August	Kent	v	(H) Derbyshire	Derbyshire won by 2 wickets
Scorecard	265 (75.5 overs); MT Coles 57 (83); TD Groenewald 3/41 (19 overs)		132 (47.3 overs); DJ Wainwright 29* (67); CE Shreck 5/41 (16.3 overs)	County Ground, Derby; Umpires: RJ Bailey and MA Gough
Scorecard	161 (56.5 overs); RWT Key 81 (156); AD Palladino 7/53 (23.5 overs)		298/8 (96.2 overs); UT Khawaja 56 (137); CE Shreck 4/99 (30 overs)	County Ground, Derby; Umpires: RJ Bailey and MA Gough
Derbyshire won the toss and elected to field; Points: Derbyshire 19, Kent 5

8–10 August	Kent (H)	v	Essex	Essex won by 7 wickets
Scorecard	226 (84.3 overs); MJ Powell 62 (128); DD Masters 3/44 (18.1 overs)		273 (94.4 overs); AJA Wheater 82 (109); CE Shreck 5/51 (25.4 overs)	St Lawrence Ground, Canterbury; Umpires: NJ Llong and JW Lloyds
Scorecard	101 (37 overs); DI Stevens 22 (32); MA Chambers 4/31 (13 overs)		55/3 (18.3 overs); ML Pettini 19* (29); Azhar Mahmood 2/25 (8 overs)	St Lawrence Ground, Canterbury; Umpires: NJ Llong and JW Lloyds
Kent won the toss and elected to bat; Points: Kent 4, Essex 21

15–18 August	Kent	v	(H) Gloucestershire	Match drawn
Scorecard	300/9d (92.4 overs); AJ Blake 73 (136); WRS Gidman 3/75 (24 overs)		1/0d (0.1 overs); RJ Nicol 1* (1)	County Ground, Bristol; Umpires: NL Bainton and BJ Debenham
Gloucestershire won the toss and elected to field; No play on days 1 and 3 due to rain; Only 11.2 overs bowled on day 2; Points: Gloucestershire 6, Kent 6

28–31 August	Kent	v	(H) Leicestershire	Kent won by 147 runs
Scorecard	350/8d (92.2 overs); BP Nash 119 (172); RML Taylor 5/91 (19 overs)		171/3d (52.1 overs); MAG Boyce 78* (141); CE Shreck 2/63 (17 overs)	Grace Road, Leicester; Umpires: MA Gough and G Sharp
Scorecard	103/2d (23 overs); AJ Blake 35* (50); Michael Thornely 1/16 (6 overs)		135 (49.5 overs); JKH Naik 33 (47); DI Stevens 5/35 (14 overs)	Grace Road, Leicester; Umpires: MA Gough and G Sharp
Leicestershire won the toss and elected to field; No play on day 2 due to rain; Adam Riley replaced James Tredwell in the XI after day 1 due to an England call-up Points: Leicestershire 2, Kent 21

4–7 September	Kent (H)	v	Derbyshire	Kent won by 222 runs
Scorecard	261 (82.3 overs); GO Jones 80 (136); TD Groenewald 3/63 (19 overs)		200 (79.2 overs); WL Madsen 64 (135); M Davies 5/27 (18 overs)	St Lawrence Ground, Canterbury; Umpires: NGB Cook and NA Mallender
Scorecard	342/8d (101.3 overs); SA Northeast 165 (306); DJ Wainwright 3/77 (28 overs)		181 (108.2 overs); UT Khawaja 53 (180); DI Stevens 4/37 (19 overs)	St Lawrence Ground, Canterbury; Umpires: NGB Cook and NA Mallender
Kent won the toss and elected to bat; James Tredwell replaced Adam Riley in the XI after day 2, having been released from England duty Points: Kent 21, Derbyshire 4

11–13 September	Glamorgan (H)	v	Kent	Glamorgan won by 7 wickets
Scorecard	390 (112.3 overs); J Allenby 125* (163); MT Coles 4/76 (18.3 overs)		170 (53.5 overs); SA Northeast 62 (132); RDB Croft 5/31 (11.5 overs)	Sophia Gardens, Cardiff; Umpires: SA Garratt and TE Jesty
Scorecard	61/3 (14.2 overs); WD Bragg 25 (27); MT Coles 2/28 (7 overs)		280 (83.4 overs) (f/o); GO Jones 81 (148); JC Glover 3/43 (14 overs)	Sophia Gardens, Cardiff; Umpires: SA Garratt and TE Jesty
Kent won the toss and elected to field; Points: Glamorgan 23, Kent 3

== Other first-class match ==
=== Tour match ===
13–15 July	Kent (H)	v	South Africans	Match drawn
Scorecard	210 (74.2 overs); MJ Powell 48* (137); Imran Tahir 4/31 (14.2 overs)		314 (93 overs); HM Amla 77 (132); CE Shreck 3/90 (24 overs)	St Lawrence Ground, Canterbury; Umpires: JH Evans and TE Jesty
Scorecard	105/0 (22 overs); SA Northeast 54* (69)			St Lawrence Ground, Canterbury; Umpires: JH Evans and TE Jesty
South Africans won the toss and elected to field

== Clydesdale Bank 40 ==
=== Group C ===
Pos	Team	Pld	W	L	T	NR	Pts	NRR
1	Sussex Sharks	12	7	1	0	4	18	1.012
2	Warwickshire Bears	12	8	3	0	1	17	0.660
3	Kent Spitfires	12	7	2	0	3	17	0.870
4	Derbyshire Falcons	12	4	5	0	3	11	−0.438
5	Yorkshire Carnegie	12	4	7	0	1	9	0.006
6	Northamptonshire Steelbacks	12	1	6	0	5	7	−0.568
7	Unicorns	12	1	8	0	3	5	−1.545

=== Matches ===
6 May	Yorkshire (H); 175/9 (40 overs)	v	Kent; 176/6 (39.2 overs)	Kent won by 4 wickets (with 4 balls remaining)
Scorecard	Yorkshire (H); 175/9 (40 overs)	v	Kent; 176/6 (39.2 overs)	Headingley, Leeds; Umpires: DJ Millns and P Willey; Player of the match: MT Coles (Kent)
Scorecard	JE Root 49 (64); MT Coles 6/32 (8 overs)		DI Stevens 59 (51); Azeem Rafiq 3/22 (8 overs)	Headingley, Leeds; Umpires: DJ Millns and P Willey; Player of the match: MT Coles (Kent)
Yorkshire won the toss and elected to bat; Points: Yorkshire 0, Kent 2				Headingley, Leeds; Umpires: DJ Millns and P Willey; Player of the match: MT Coles (Kent)

20 May	Kent (H); 165 (39.5 overs)	v	Unicorns; 166/6 (39 overs)	Unicorns won by 4 wickets (with 6 balls remaining)
Scorecard	Kent (H); 165 (39.5 overs)	v	Unicorns; 166/6 (39 overs)	St Lawrence Ground, Canterbury; Umpires: NGB Cook and NGC Cowley
Scorecard	SA Northeast 69 (94); RG Querl 4/41 (8 overs)		KA Parsons 46 (57); JC Tredwell 4/24 (8 overs)	St Lawrence Ground, Canterbury; Umpires: NGB Cook and NGC Cowley
Kent won the toss and elected to bat; Points: Kent 0, Unicorns 2				St Lawrence Ground, Canterbury; Umpires: NGB Cook and NGC Cowley

1 June	Warwickshire; 94/7 (26.3 overs)	v	(H) Kent; 96/0 (16.3 overs)	Kent won by 10 wickets (with 57 balls remaining) (D/L method)
Scorecard	Warwickshire; 94/7 (26.3 overs)	v	(H) Kent; 96/0 (16.3 overs)	St Lawrence Ground, Canterbury; Umpires: RA Kettleborough and RT Robinson; Player of the match: M Davies (Kent)
Scorecard	R Clarke 39 (56); M Davies 3/10 (8 overs)		SW Billings 58* (54)	St Lawrence Ground, Canterbury; Umpires: RA Kettleborough and RT Robinson; Player of the match: M Davies (Kent)
Warwickshire won the toss and elected to bat; The Warwickshire innings stopped by rain after 26.3 overs. Kent were then set a D/L target of 96 runs to win from 26 overs.; Points: Kent 2, Warwickshire 0				St Lawrence Ground, Canterbury; Umpires: RA Kettleborough and RT Robinson; Player of the match: M Davies (Kent)

5 June	Unicorns (H); 177/8 (40 overs)	v	Kent; 9/0 (3 overs)	No result
Scorecard	Unicorns (H); 177/8 (40 overs)	v	Kent; 9/0 (3 overs)	Garon Park, Southend-on-Sea; Umpires: MJD Bodenham and PJ Hartley
Scorecard	JE Ord 52 (76); BP Nash 2/14 (6 overs)		SW Billings 5* (10)	Garon Park, Southend-on-Sea; Umpires: MJD Bodenham and PJ Hartley
Kent won the toss and elected to field; Rain stopped play after 3 overs of Kent's innings; Points: Unicorns 1, Kent 1				Garon Park, Southend-on-Sea; Umpires: MJD Bodenham and PJ Hartley

10 June	Northamptonshire; 168/5 (32 overs)	v	(H) Kent; 6/0 (1 overs)	No result
Scorecard	Northamptonshire; 168/5 (32 overs)	v	(H) Kent; 6/0 (1 overs)	Nevill Ground, Tunbridge Wells; Umpires: SC Gale and RK Illingworth
Scorecard	NJ O'Brien 46 (71); DI Stevens 2/33 (8 overs)		SW Billings 5* (5)	Nevill Ground, Tunbridge Wells; Umpires: SC Gale and RK Illingworth
Kent won the toss and elected to field; Rain interrupted the Northamptonshire innings after 29 overs with the score at 137/4, reducing the match to 32 overs per side. The Kent innings was interrupted after 1 over with score at 6/0 and they were set a new D/L target of 138 runs to win from 18 overs, but no further play was possible; Points: Kent 1, Northamptonshire 1				Nevill Ground, Tunbridge Wells; Umpires: SC Gale and RK Illingworth

16 July	Sussex (H)	v	Kent	No result (match abandoned without a toss)
Scorecard	Sussex (H)	v	Kent	Arundel Castle Cricket Ground, Arundel; Umpires: NJ Llong and SJ O'Shaughnessy
Points: Sussex 1, Kent 1				Arundel Castle Cricket Ground, Arundel; Umpires: NJ Llong and SJ O'Shaughnessy

31 July	Derbyshire (H); 62/5 (14 overs)	v	Kent; 68/1 (10.5 overs)	Kent won by 9 wickets (with 19 balls remaining) (D/L method)
Scorecard	Derbyshire (H); 62/5 (14 overs)	v	Kent; 68/1 (10.5 overs)	County Ground, Derby; Umpires: RJ Bailey and RK Illingworth
Scorecard	JL Clare 11* (3); DI Stevens 2/3 (2 overs)		SW Billings 28* (30); ML Turner 1/22 (3 overs)	County Ground, Derby; Umpires: RJ Bailey and RK Illingworth
Kent won the toss and elected to field; Rain interrupted the Derbyshire innings after 13 overs with the score at 46/4, reducing the innings to 14 overs per side. Kent were set a D/L target of 67 runs to win from 14 overs.; Points: Derbyshire 0, Kent 2				County Ground, Derby; Umpires: RJ Bailey and RK Illingworth

12 August	Kent (H); 248/6 (40 overs)	v	Derbyshire; 137 (31.4 overs)	Kent won by 111 runs
Scorecard	Kent (H); 248/6 (40 overs)	v	Derbyshire; 137 (31.4 overs)	St Lawrence Ground, Canterbury; Umpires: NJ Llong and JW Lloyds
Scorecard	SW Billings 143 (113); PI Burgoyne 2/32 (7 overs)		WL Madsen 32 (47); DI Stevens 5/36 (8 overs)	St Lawrence Ground, Canterbury; Umpires: NJ Llong and JW Lloyds
Derbyshire won the toss and elected to field; Points: Kent 2, Derbyshire 0				St Lawrence Ground, Canterbury; Umpires: NJ Llong and JW Lloyds

13 August	Warwickshire (H); 92 (30.4 overs)	v	Kent; 93/4 (20.2 overs)	Kent won by 6 wickets (with 118 balls remaining)
Scorecard	Warwickshire (H); 92 (30.4 overs)	v	Kent; 93/4 (20.2 overs)	Edgbaston, Birmingham; Umpires: NGC Cowley and JH Evans; Player of the match: DI Stevens (Kent)
Scorecard	R Clarke 35* (66); DI Stevens 4/25 (7.4 overs)		Azhar Mahmood 20* (16); DL Maddy 2/30 (4.2 overs)	Edgbaston, Birmingham; Umpires: NGC Cowley and JH Evans; Player of the match: DI Stevens (Kent)
Kent won the toss and elected to field; Points: Warwickshire 0, Kent 2				Edgbaston, Birmingham; Umpires: NGC Cowley and JH Evans; Player of the match: DI Stevens (Kent)

19 August	Northamptonshire (H); 232/9 (40 overs)	v	Kent; 233/5 (38.4 overs)	Kent won by 5 wickets (with 8 balls remaining)
Scorecard	Northamptonshire (H); 232/9 (40 overs)	v	Kent; 233/5 (38.4 overs)	County Ground, Northampton; Umpires: RJ Bailey and JH Evans
Scorecard	AG Wakely 74 (76); MT Coles 3/45 (7 overs)		BP Nash 70* (52); CD de Lange 3/35 (8 overs)	County Ground, Northampton; Umpires: RJ Bailey and JH Evans
Northamptonshire won the toss and elected to bat; Points: Northamptonshire 0, Kent 2				County Ground, Northampton; Umpires: RJ Bailey and JH Evans

22 August	Kent (H); 226/5 (40 overs)	v	Yorkshire; 196 (38.2 overs)	Kent won by 30 runs
Scorecard	Kent (H); 226/5 (40 overs)	v	Yorkshire; 196 (38.2 overs)	St Lawrence Ground, Canterbury; Umpires: MJD Bodenham and RA Kettleborough; Player of the match: RWT Key (Kent)
Scorecard	RWT Key 101 (109); MA Ashraf 2/36 (8 overs)		AW Gale 57 (88); MT Coles 3/25 (4.2 overs)	St Lawrence Ground, Canterbury; Umpires: MJD Bodenham and RA Kettleborough; Player of the match: RWT Key (Kent)
Yorkshire won the toss and elected to field; Points: Kent 2, Yorkshire 0				St Lawrence Ground, Canterbury; Umpires: MJD Bodenham and RA Kettleborough; Player of the match: RWT Key (Kent)

27 August	Kent (H); 210/5 (40 overs)	v	Sussex; 211/1 (30 overs)	Sussex won by 9 wickets (with 60 balls remaining)
Scorecard	Kent (H); 210/5 (40 overs)	v	Sussex; 211/1 (30 overs)	St Lawrence Ground, Canterbury; Umpires: RA Kettleborough and JW Lloyds
Scorecard	BP Nash 51* (59); KO Wernars 1/32 (6 overs)		LJ Wright 101* (90); DI Stevens 1/51 (7 overs)	St Lawrence Ground, Canterbury; Umpires: RA Kettleborough and JW Lloyds
Kent won the toss and elected to bat; Points: Kent 0, Sussex 2				St Lawrence Ground, Canterbury; Umpires: RA Kettleborough and JW Lloyds

== Friends Life t20 ==
=== South Division ===
Pos	Team	Pld	W	L	T	NR	Pts	NRR
1	Sussex Sharks	10	6	1	0	3	15	1.389
2	Hampshire Royals	10	5	2	0	3	13	0.693
3	Essex Eagles	10	5	4	0	1	11	−0.032
4	Kent Spitfires	10	4	5	0	1	9	−0.465
5	Middlesex Panthers	10	3	7	0	0	6	−0.210
6	Surrey Lions	10	3	7	0	0	6	−0.700

=== Matches ===
12 June	Kent (H)	v	Sussex	No result (match abandoned without a toss)
Scorecard	Kent (H)	v	Sussex	Nevill Ground, Tunbridge Wells; Umpires: RJ Bailey and RT Robinson
No toss; Points: Kent 1, Sussex 1				Nevill Ground, Tunbridge Wells; Umpires: RJ Bailey and RT Robinson

17 June	Surrey; 176/3 (20 overs)	v	(H) Kent; 120/2 (16.2 overs)	Kent won by 8 wickets (with 22 balls remaining)
Scorecard	Surrey; 176/3 (20 overs)	v	(H) Kent; 120/2 (16.2 overs)	County Cricket Ground, Beckenham, Beckenham; Umpires: NL Bainton and SJ O'Shaughnessy; Player of the match: RWT Key (Kent)
Scorecard	GC Wilson 53* (43); Azhar Mahmood 2/12 (2 overs)		RWT Key 51* (46); JW Dernbach 1/22 (3 overs)	County Cricket Ground, Beckenham, Beckenham; Umpires: NL Bainton and SJ O'Shaughnessy; Player of the match: RWT Key (Kent)
Surrey won the toss and elected to bat; Points: Kent 2, Surrey 0				County Cricket Ground, Beckenham, Beckenham; Umpires: NL Bainton and SJ O'Shaughnessy; Player of the match: RWT Key (Kent)

20 June	Essex (H); 158/6 (20 overs)	v	Kent; 155 (20 overs)	Essex won by 3 runs
Scorecard	Essex (H); 158/6 (20 overs)	v	Kent; 155 (20 overs)	County Ground, Chelmsford; Umpires: G Sharp and P Willey; Player of the match: JS Foster & GM Smith (both Essex)
Scorecard	JS Foster 51 (27); AJ Ball 2/32 (4 overs)		SW Billings 59 (55); GM Smith 5/17 (3 overs)	County Ground, Chelmsford; Umpires: G Sharp and P Willey; Player of the match: JS Foster & GM Smith (both Essex)
Kent won the toss and elected to field; Points: Essex 2, Kent 0				County Ground, Chelmsford; Umpires: G Sharp and P Willey; Player of the match: JS Foster & GM Smith (both Essex)

22 June	Kent; 151/5 (20 overs)	v	(H) Hampshire; 148/6 (15.4 overs)	Kent won by 3 runs
Scorecard	Kent; 151/5 (20 overs)	v	(H) Hampshire; 148/6 (15.4 overs)	The Rose Bowl, Southampton; Umpires: JH Evans and JW Lloyds; Player of the match: SA Northeast (Kent)
Scorecard	SA Northeast 46* (26); AD Mascarenhas 2/21 (4 overs)		JM Vince 31 (24); JC Tredwell 2/27 (4 overs)	The Rose Bowl, Southampton; Umpires: JH Evans and JW Lloyds; Player of the match: SA Northeast (Kent)
Hampshire won the toss and elected to field; Points: Hampshire 0, Kent 2				The Rose Bowl, Southampton; Umpires: JH Evans and JW Lloyds; Player of the match: SA Northeast (Kent)

24 June	Kent (H); 135/6 (20 overs)	v	Hampshire; 138/4 (18.2 overs)	Hampshire win by 6 wickets (with 10 balls remaining)
Scorecard	Kent (H); 135/6 (20 overs)	v	Hampshire; 138/4 (18.2 overs)	St Lawrence Ground, Canterbury; Umpires: MJD Bodenham and DJ Millns; Player of the match: GJ Maxwell (Hampshire)
Scorecard	DI Stevens 60 (44); GJ Maxwell 2/10 (2 overs)		GJ Maxwell 66* (32); AJ Ball 2/27 (4 overs)	St Lawrence Ground, Canterbury; Umpires: MJD Bodenham and DJ Millns; Player of the match: GJ Maxwell (Hampshire)
Kent won the toss and elected to bat; Points: Kent 0, Hampshire 2				St Lawrence Ground, Canterbury; Umpires: MJD Bodenham and DJ Millns; Player of the match: GJ Maxwell (Hampshire)

26 June	Middlesex; 207/2 (20 overs)	v	(H) Kent; 159/7 (20 overs)	Middlesex won by 48 runs
Scorecard	Middlesex; 207/2 (20 overs)	v	(H) Kent; 159/7 (20 overs)	St Lawrence Ground, Canterbury; Umpires: MJD Bodenham and G Sharp; Player of the match: JL Denly (Middlesex)
Scorecard	JL Denly 90* (66); JC Tredwell 1/23 (4 overs)		SA Northeast 60 (43); NJ Dexter 3/22 (4 overs)	St Lawrence Ground, Canterbury; Umpires: MJD Bodenham and G Sharp; Player of the match: JL Denly (Middlesex)
Middlesex won the toss and elected to bat; Points: Kent 0, Middlesex 2				St Lawrence Ground, Canterbury; Umpires: MJD Bodenham and G Sharp; Player of the match: JL Denly (Middlesex)

29 June	Sussex (H); 212/6 (20 overs)	v	Kent; 129 (19.4 overs)	Sussex won by 83 runs
Scorecard	Sussex (H); 212/6 (20 overs)	v	Kent; 129 (19.4 overs)	County Ground, Hove; Umpires: NL Bainton and MA Gough; Player of the match: MW Goodwin (Sussex)
Scorecard	MW Goodwin 68* (31); SJ Cook 3/41 (4 overs)		SW Billings 38 (37); MJG Rippon 4/23 (4 overs)	County Ground, Hove; Umpires: NL Bainton and MA Gough; Player of the match: MW Goodwin (Sussex)
Sussex won the toss and elected to bat; Points: Sussex 2, Kent 0				County Ground, Hove; Umpires: NL Bainton and MA Gough; Player of the match: MW Goodwin (Sussex)

5 July	Kent; 136/8 (20 overs)	v	(H) Surrey; 88 (17.3 overs)	Kent won by 48 runs
Scorecard	Kent; 136/8 (20 overs)	v	(H) Surrey; 88 (17.3 overs)	The Oval, Kennington, London; Umpires: NGB Cook and TE Jesty; Player of the match: AJ Blake (Kent)
Scorecard	AJ Blake 35 (26); CT Tremlett 2/23 (4 overs)		ZS Ansari 25 (33); Azhar Mahmood 3/12 (3 overs)	The Oval, Kennington, London; Umpires: NGB Cook and TE Jesty; Player of the match: AJ Blake (Kent)
Surrey won the toss and elected to field; Points: Surrey 0, Kent 2				The Oval, Kennington, London; Umpires: NGB Cook and TE Jesty; Player of the match: AJ Blake (Kent)

6 July	Essex; 149/5 (20 overs)	v	(H) Kent; 126/9 (20 overs)	Essex won by 23 runs
Scorecard	Essex; 149/5 (20 overs)	v	(H) Kent; 126/9 (20 overs)	St Lawrence Ground, Canterbury; Umpires: SC Gale and NA Mallender; Player of the match: ML Pettini (Essex)
Scorecard	ML Pettini 59 (45); DI Stevens 3/13 (4 overs)		GO Jones 24* (17); RJW Topley 3/19 (4 overs)	St Lawrence Ground, Canterbury; Umpires: SC Gale and NA Mallender; Player of the match: ML Pettini (Essex)
Kent won the toss and elected to field; Points: Kent 0, Essex 2				St Lawrence Ground, Canterbury; Umpires: SC Gale and NA Mallender; Player of the match: ML Pettini (Essex)

8 July	Middlesex (H); 124/9 (20 overs)	v	Kent; 125/7 (19 overs)	Kent won by 3 wickets (with 6 balls remaining)
Scorecard	Middlesex (H); 124/9 (20 overs)	v	Kent; 125/7 (19 overs)	Uxbridge Cricket Club Ground, Uxbridge; Umpires: RT Robinson and P Willey; Player of the match: DI Stevens (Kent)
Scorecard	NJ Dexter 42 (38); DI Stevens 3/23 (4 overs)		Azhar Mahmood 30 (26); SP Crook 2/21 (4 overs)	Uxbridge Cricket Club Ground, Uxbridge; Umpires: RT Robinson and P Willey; Player of the match: DI Stevens (Kent)
Kent won the toss and elected to field; Points: Middlesex 0, Kent 2				Uxbridge Cricket Club Ground, Uxbridge; Umpires: RT Robinson and P Willey; Player of the match: DI Stevens (Kent)

== MCCU match ==
Kent's 3-day match against Oxford MCCU in May did not have first-class status.

2–4 May	Kent	v	(H) Oxford MCCU	Match drawn
Scorecard	251/8d (69.4 overs); AJ Blake 97 (148); SS Agarwal 4/49 (16.4 overs)		192/7d (72.5 overs); CAM Walker 64 (103); AJ Blake 3/10 (7 overs)	The Parks, Oxford; Umpires: N Duguid and RK Illingworth
Kent won the toss and elected to bat; No play on day 2; Match did not have first-class status
