= Kent County Cricket Club in 2015 =

Kent County Cricket Club
2015 season
- Coach: (Cricket West Indies) Jimmy Adams
- Captain: (England) Rob Key (England) Sam Northeast (on-field captain from 10 May)
- Overseas player: None
- Ground(s): St Lawrence Ground, Canterbury; Nevill Ground, Tunbridge Wells; County Ground, Beckenham
- County Championship: 7th, Division Two
- Royal London One-Day Cup: Quarter-finals
- NatWest t20 Blast: Quarter-finals
- Most runs: FC: SA Northeast (1,204); LA: DJ Bell-Drummond (272); T20: SA Northeast (641)
- Most wickets: FC: MT Coles (67); LA: MT Coles (16); T20: ME Claydon (20)
- Most catches: FC: MT Coles (15); LA: AJ Blake (6); FK Cowdrey (6); T20: MT Coles (8)
- Most wicket-keeping dismissals: FC: SW Billings (34); LA: SW Billings (9); T20: SW Billings (10)

In 2015, Kent County Cricket Club competed in Division Two of the County Championship, Group B of the 50-over Royal London One-Day Cup and the South Group of the NatWest t20 Blast. The team reached the quarter-finals of both one day competitions but struggled in the County Championship, finishing seventh in Division Two.

The season was the fourth in charge for head coach Jimmy Adams. The club captain was former England batsmen Rob Key, although Sam Northeast took over the on-field captaincy in May after Key, having dropped himself due to poor form, chose to relinquish the captaincy to concentrate on his batting. Northeast replaced Key as the club captain for the 2016 season.

Two players from the Kent squad made senior international appearances for England in 2015. James Tredwell was a part of the World Cup squad, but only featured in the final group stage match against Afghanistan after both teams had already been eliminated from the tournament. He then played in the first Test against the West Indies in Antigua (only his second Test, having made his debut in 2010). Tredwell took 5 wickets in the match but did not play in the remainder of the series, and with England turning to several younger players after the disappointing World Cup, he was not selected during the English summer. One of the new faces in the England team over the summer was Kent keeper Sam Billings who played as a specialist batsmen in all 5 ODI matches against Australia and the single T20I matches against both Australia and New Zealand.

Matt Coles won the club's Player of the Year award, taking 100 wickets across all formats in the first season of his second spell at the county.

== Squad ==
The start of the season saw the return of top-order batsman Joe Denly and fast bowler Matt Coles after spells at Middlesex and Hampshire, respectively. The squad did not include an overseas player.

South African-born batsman Sean Dickson, who holds a UK passport, signed for the county midway through the season after an impressive trial in the Second XI. Having not made an appearance for the first XI since May, former West Indies international Brendan Nash agreed to end his three-and-a-half-year spell at Kent by mutual consent.

=== Squad list ===
- Ages given as of the first day of the County Championship season, 12 April 2015.

| No. | Name | Nationality | Birth date | Batting style | Bowling style | Notes |
Batsmen
| 4 | Rob Key | England | 12 May 1979 (aged 35) | Right-handed | Right arm off break | Club captain |
| 6 | Joe Denly | England | 16 March 1986 (aged 29) | Right-handed | Right arm leg break | |
| 10 | Alex Blake | England | 25 January 1989 (aged 26) | Left-handed | Right arm medium-fast | |
| 17 | Sam Northeast | England | 16 October 1989 (aged 25) | Right-handed | Right arm off break | Vice-captain |
| 23 | Daniel Bell-Drummond | England | 3 August 1993 (aged 21) | Right-handed | Right arm medium | |
| 30 | Fabian Cowdrey | England | 30 January 1993 (aged 22) | Right-handed | Slow left-arm orthodox | |
| 40 | Brendan Nash | Jamaica | 14 December 1977 (aged 37) | Left-handed | Left arm medium | Kolpak Registration. Released in August. |
| 58 | Sean Dickson | South Africa | 2 September 1991 (aged 23) | Right-handed | Right arm medium | British passport holder. Signed in July. |
All-rounders
| 3 | Darren Stevens | England | 30 April 1976 (aged 38) | Right-handed | Right arm medium | |
| 21 | Ben Harmison | England | 9 January 1986 (aged 29) | Left-handed | Right arm medium-fast | |
| 24 | Adam Ball | England | 1 March 1993 (aged 22) | Right-handed | Left arm fast-medium | |
| 25 | Calum Haggett | England | 30 October 1990 (aged 24) | Left-handed | Right arm medium-fast | |
| 26 | Matt Coles | England | 26 May 1990 (aged 24) | Left-handed | Right arm fast-medium | |
Wicket-keepers
| 7 | Ryan Davies | England | 5 November 1993 (aged 21) | Right-handed | — | |
| 20 | Sam Billings | England | 15 June 1991 (aged 23) | Right-handed | — | |
Bowlers
| 5 | Ivan Thomas | England | 25 September 1991 (aged 23) | Right-handed | Right arm medium-fast | |
| 8 | Mitchell Claydon | England | 25 November 1982 (aged 32) | Left-handed | Right arm medium-fast | |
| 11 | Imran Qayyum | England | 23 May 1993 (aged 21) | Right-handed | Slow left-arm orthodox | |
| 14 | Matt Hunn | England | 22 March 1994 (aged 21) | Right-handed | Right arm fast-medium | |
| 15 | James Tredwell | England | 27 February 1982 (aged 33) | Left-handed | Right arm off break | |
| 18 | David Griffiths | England | 10 November 1985 (aged 29) | Left-handed | Right arm fast-medium | |
| 19 | Sam Weller | England | 21 November 1994 (aged 20) | Right-handed | Right arm fast-medium | |
| 22 | Charlie Hartley | England | 4 January 1994 (aged 21) | Right-handed | Right arm medium-fast | |
| 27 | Hugh Bernard | England | 14 September 1996 (aged 18) | Right-handed | Right arm medium-fast | |
| 33 | Adam Riley | England | 23 March 1992 (aged 23) | Right-handed | Right arm off break | |

== County Championship ==
Kent endured another difficult season in Division Two of the County Championship. Poor batting performances ultimately resulted in a seventh-place finish, although the team finished the season strongly and ended with 4 victories. The team regularly featured a number of young players and the bowling was impressive. Matt Coles took 67 championship wickets in 14 matches on his return to the county (and 100 wickets across all formats), while veteran all-rounder Darren Stevens again made a significant contribution with the ball. In addition, young seam bowlers including Calum Haggett and Ivan Thomas impressed throughout the season and were rewarded with contract extensions while Matt Hunn broke into the team after taking his first five wicket haul against the touring Australian team in June.

=== Division Two ===
| Team | Pld | W | L | T | D | A | Bat | Bowl | Ded | Pts |
|---|---|---|---|---|---|---|---|---|---|---|
| Surrey (P) | 16 | 8 | 1 | 0 | 7 | 0 | 56 | 45 | 0 | 264 |
| Lancashire (P) | 16 | 7 | 1 | 0 | 8 | 0 | 58 | 44 | 0 | 254 |
| Essex | 16 | 6 | 5 | 0 | 5 | 0 | 37 | 42 | 0 | 200 |
| Glamorgan | 16 | 4 | 4 | 0 | 8 | 0 | 42 | 37 | 0 | 183 |
| Northamptonshire | 16 | 3 | 3 | 0 | 10 | 0 | 38 | 46 | 2 | 180 |
| Gloucestershire | 16 | 5 | 5 | 0 | 6 | 0 | 31 | 36 | 0 | 177 |
| Kent | 16 | 4 | 7 | 0 | 5 | 0 | 28 | 44 | 0 | 161 |
| Derbyshire | 16 | 3 | 7 | 0 | 6 | 0 | 34 | 42 | 1 | 153 |
| Leicestershire | 16 | 2 | 9 | 0 | 5 | 0 | 36 | 41 | 16 | 118 |

=== Matches ===
| 19–21 April | Kent | v | (H) Essex | Essex won by 5 wickets |
| Scorecard | 193 (68.5 overs); DI Stevens 50 (90); JD Ryder 5/43 (18 overs) | | 164 (46.5 overs); GR Napier 57 (40); DI Stevens 4/47 (13 overs) | County Ground, Chelmsford; Umpires: PK Baldwin and NA Mallender |
| Scorecard | 163 (51 overs); SA Northeast 77 (124); DD Masters 4/45 (13 overs) | | 193/5 (51.3 overs); JS Foster 80* (103); ME Claydon 3/55 (14 overs) | County Ground, Chelmsford; Umpires: PK Baldwin and NA Mallender |
Essex won the toss and elected to field; Points: Essex 19, Kent 3

| 26–29 April | Lancashire (H) | v | Kent | Lancashire won by 9 wickets |
| Scorecard | 444 (127.1 overs); AG Prince 106 (172); ME Claydon 4/103 (30.1 overs) | | 252 (71.2 overs); SA Northeast 55 (129); KM Jarvis 4/50 (18 overs) | Old Trafford, Manchester; Umpires: JH Evans and RT Robinson |
| Scorecard | 107/1 (18.4 overs); PJ Horton 67* (62); ME Claydon 1/30 (6.4 overs) | | 295 (123.4 overs) (f/o); JL Denly 60 (127); KM Jarvis 4/67 (28 overs) | Old Trafford, Manchester; Umpires: JH Evans and RT Robinson |
Lancashire won the toss and elected to bat; Points: Lancashire 23, Kent 4

| 3–6 May | Leicestershire | v | (H) Kent | Match drawn |
| Scorecard | 386 (91.5 overs); MJ Cosgrove 113 (130); DI Stevens 5/88 (22.5 overs) | | 268 (90.5 overs); JL Denly 87 (214); CJ McKay 6/54 (23.5 overs) | St Lawrence Ground, Canterbury; Umpires: DJ Millns and SJ O'Shaughnessy |
| Scorecard | 196 (62.3 overs); CJ McKay 43 (36); IAA Thomas 4/48 (62.3 overs) | | 273/7 (71 overs); DJ Bell-Drummond 103 (191); CE Shreck 4/75 (23 overs) | St Lawrence Ground, Canterbury; Umpires: DJ Millns and SJ O'Shaughnessy |
Kent won the toss and elected to field; Points: Kent 10, Leicestershire 12

| 10–13 May | Kent (H) | v | Glamorgan | Match drawn |
| Scorecard | 357 (102 overs); DJ Bell-Drummond 123 (249); MG Hogan 5/71 (28 overs) | | 281 (84 overs); WD Bragg 104 (208); IAA Thomas 3/40 (17 overs) | St Lawrence Ground, Canterbury; Umpires: RJ Bailey and NGB Cook |
| Scorecard | 327 (83.4 overs); JL Denly 66 (112); MG Hogan 4/65 (19.4 overs) | | 309/9 (107 overs); DA Cosker 69 (183); CJ Haggett 4/61 (23 overs) | St Lawrence Ground, Canterbury; Umpires: RJ Bailey and NGB Cook |
Kent won the toss and elected to bat; Points: Kent 12, Glamorgan 10

| 18–21 May | Gloucestershire (H) | v | Kent | Kent won by 8 wickets |
| Scorecard | 193 (64.4 overs); PSP Handscomb 69 (114); MT Coles 3/49 (19 overs) | | 235 (84 overs); MT Coles 66 (83); LC Norwell 4/44 (24 overs) | County Ground, Bristol; Umpires: RJ Evans and RA Kettleborough |
| Scorecard | 282 (86.1 overs); HJH Marshall 83 (131); IAA Thomas 4/53 (19.1 overs) | | 243/2 (64.4 overs); JL Denly 117* (197); CN Miles 1/49 (14 overs) | County Ground, Bristol; Umpires: RJ Evans and RA Kettleborough |
Kent won the toss and elected to field; Points: Gloucestershire 3, Kent 20

| 24–27 May | Kent (H) | v | Surrey | Surrey beat Kent by 3 wickets |
| Scorecard | 282 (85.3 overs); RWT Key 89 (134); TM Curran 3/64 (22 overs) | | 292 (101.1 overs); SM Davies 45 (89); DI Stevens 4/48 (19.1 overs) | County Ground, Beckenham; Umpires: PJ Hartley and PR Pollard |
| Scorecard | 204 (65.4 overs); JL Denly 66 (152); ZS Ansari 4/58 (21 overs) | | 196/7 (50.1 overs); JJ Roy 60* (51); DI Stevens 3/29 (10 overs) | County Ground, Beckenham; Umpires: PJ Hartley and PR Pollard |
Kent won the toss and elected to bat; Points: Kent 5, Surrey 21

| 7–9 June | Kent (H) | v | Derbyshire | Derbyshire won by 8 wickets |
| Scorecard | 205 (66.2 overs); SA Northeast 85 (118); MHA Footitt 5/45 (17 overs) | | 86 (32 overs); WJ Durston 35 (46); MT Coles 5/24 (12 overs) | St Lawrence Ground, Canterbury; Umpires: RJ Evans and DJ Millns |
| Scorecard | 112 (36.4 overs); DJ Bell-Drummond 45 (66); WA White 6/25 (9.4 overs) | | 232/2 (63.2 overs); CF Hughes 94 (179); MT Coles 2/75 (19 overs) | St Lawrence Ground, Canterbury; Umpires: RJ Evans and DJ Millns |
Kent won the toss and elected to bat; Points: Kent 4, Derbyshire 19

| 20–22 June | Kent | v | (H) Northamptonshire | Northamptonshire won by 8 wickets |
| Scorecard | 140 (36.2 overs); SA Northeast 36 (41); Azharullah 5/31 (13 overs) | | 246 (71 overs); RI Keogh 68 (99); MT Coles 4/83 (24 overs) | County Ground, Northampton; Umpires: SA Garratt and NA Mallender |
| Scorecard | 151 (38.5 overs); JL Denly 39 (70); OP Stone 5/44 (10 overs) | | 46/2 (9 overs); RI Newton 27 (20); IAA Thomas 1/8 (3 overs) | County Ground, Northampton; Umpires: SA Garratt and NA Mallender |
Northamptonshire won the toss and elected to field; Points: Northamptonshire 20, Kent 3

| 5–7 July | Leicestershire (H) | v | Kent | Kent won by 8 wickets |
| Scorecard | 159 (51.1 overs); EJH Eckersley 41 (52); MT Coles 6/55 (15 overs) | | 210 (54.4 overs); DI Stevens 63 (72); OH Freckingham 3/32 (6 overs) | Grace Road, Leicester; Umpires: SC Gale and NA Mallender |
| Scorecard | 123 (48.2 overs); BA Raine 41* (74); MT Coles 4/43 (17.2 overs) | | 74/2 (15.2 overs); JL Denly 37* (48); BA Raine 2/34 (7.2 overs) | Grace Road, Leicester; Umpires: SC Gale and NA Mallender |
Kent won the toss and elected to field; Points: Leicestershire 3, Kent 20

| 13–16 July | Kent | v | (H) Surrey | Surrey won by 6 wickets |
| Scorecard | 336 (92.2 overs); SW Billings 99 (142); SM Curran 5/101 (22.2 overs) | | 311 (82.3 overs); KC Sangakkara 110 (183); DI Stevens 4/76 (28 overs) | The Oval, Kennington, London; Umpires: BJ Debenham and SA Garratt |
| Scorecard | 99 (41.1 overs); SA Northeast 33 (64); GJ Batty 4/12 (8.1 overs) | | 128/4 (38.1 overs); BT Foakes 57* (93); JC Tredwell 3/61 (17.1 overs) | The Oval, Kennington, London; Umpires: BJ Debenham and SA Garratt |
Surrey won the toss and elected to field; Points: Surrey 22, Kent 6

| 19–21 July | Essex | v | (H) Kent | Kent won by an innings and 207 runs |
| Scorecard | 260 (81.5 overs); T Westley 77 (114); DI Stevens 4/37 (23.5 overs) | | 633/8d (143.5 overs); BW Harmison 123 (212); RS Bopara 3/89 (20 overs) | Nevill Ground, Tunbridge Wells; Umpires: M Burns and JH Evans |
| Scorecard | 166 (44.1 overs); GR Napier 35* (45); CJ Haggett 4/43 (13.1 overs) | | | Nevill Ground, Tunbridge Wells; Umpires: M Burns and JH Evans |
Essex won the toss and elected to bat; Points: Kent 24, Essex 3

| 4–6 August | Kent (H) | v | Northamptonshire | Northamptonshire won by an innings and 23 runs |
| Scorecard | 167 (51.2 overs); JL Denly 50 (73); OP Stone 4/59 (16.2 overs) | | 398 (107.4 overs); BM Duckett 145 (199); JC Tredwell 3/59 (31.4 overs) | St Lawrence Ground, Canterbury; Umpires: RJ Evans and SJ O'Shaughnessy |
| Scorecard | 208 (78 overs); SW Billings 43 (75); BW Sanderson 4/44 (12 overs) | | | St Lawrence Ground, Canterbury; Umpires: RJ Evans and SJ O'Shaughnessy |
Kent won the toss and elected to bat; Points: Kent 3, Northamptonshire 23

| 21–24 August | Derbyshire (H) | v | Kent | Match drawn |
| Scorecard | 253 (83 overs); BA Godleman 108 (161); MD Hunn 3/45 (21 overs) | | 159 (57.5 overs); RWT Key 29 (51); MHA Footitt 4/61 (19.5 overs) | County Ground, Derby; Umpires: PK Baldwin and JW Lloyds |
| Scorecard | 234/3 (67 overs); BA Godleman 105* (186); IAA Thomas 2/68 (17 overs) | | 231/5 (66.5 overs); SA Northeast 76 (155); MHA Footitt 2/64 (24 overs) | County Ground, Derby; Umpires: PK Baldwin and JW Lloyds |
Kent won the toss and elected to field; Rain ended play at Tea on Day 4; Points: Derbyshire 10, Kent 8

| 1–4 September | Kent (H) | v | Lancashire | Match drawn |
| Scorecard | 570/8d (147 overs); SA Northeast 139 (221); J Clark 3/87 (30 overs) | | 259 (87.1 overs); SJ Croft 85 (170); MT Coles 3/75 (22.1 overs) | St Lawrence Ground, Canterbury; Umpires: NL Bainton and GD Lloyd |
| Scorecard | | | 258/4 (102 overs); SJ Croft 72* (209); JC Tredwell 1/17 (20 overs) | St Lawrence Ground, Canterbury; Umpires: NL Bainton and GD Lloyd |
Lancashire won the toss and elected to field; Points: Kent 12, Lancashire 8

| 9–12 September | Kent | v | (H) Glamorgan | Kent won by 316 runs |
| Scorecard | 309 (78.3 overs); RWT Key 94 (150); MG Hogan 4/51 (20 overs) | | 207 (43.5 overs); GG Wagg 58 (59); AEN Riley 4/47 (7.5 overs) | SWALEC Stadium, Cardiff; Umpires: MJD Bodenham and AG Wharf |
| Scorecard | 451/2d (96 overs); JL Denly 161* (220); GG Wagg 1/89 (21 overs) | | 237 (62.3 overs); CA Ingram 105* (179); DI Stevens 5/58 (22 overs) | SWALEC Stadium, Cardiff; Umpires: MJD Bodenham and AG Wharf |
Kent won the toss and elected to bat; Points: Glamorgan 4, Kent 22

| 14–17 September | Kent (H) | v | Gloucestershire | Match drawn |
| Scorecard | 67/1 (15 overs); SR Dickson 31* (49); DA Payne 1/22 (5 overs) | | | St Lawrence Ground, Canterbury; Umpires: PK Baldwin and DJ Millns |
Gloucestershire won the toss and elected to field; No play on days 2, 3 or 4 due to rain and a wet outfield; Points: Kent 5, Gloucestershire 5

== Other first-class match ==
Kent hosted a first-class match at the St Lawrence Ground against Australia, providing the tourists first opposition of the 2015 Ashes tour. Australia won the game by 225 runs, although Kent opening batsman Daniel Bell-Drummond scored a century in the team's second innings and seamer Matt Hunn took his first five wickets haul.

| 25–28 June | Australians | v | (H) Kent | Australians won by 255 runs |
| Scorecard | 507/8d (124.4 overs); SE Marsh 114 (196); MD Hunn 5/99 (27 overs) | | 280 (80.2 overs); RWT Key 87 (108); MG Johnson 4/56 (18 overs) | St Lawrence Ground, Canterbury; Umpires: BJ Debenham and NJ Llong |
| Scorecard | 322/4d (62 overs); MR Marsh 101 (94); AEN Riley 3/114 (19 overs) | | 294 (58.4 overs); DJ Bell-Drummond 127 (112); SPD Smith 3/54 (5.4 overs) | St Lawrence Ground, Canterbury; Umpires: BJ Debenham and NJ Llong |
Kent won the toss and elected to field

== Royal London One-Day Cup ==
In the 2015 Royal London One-Day Cup, Kent edged through the group stage in fourth place after a thrilling run chase against Nottinghamshire at Trent Bridge in the penultimate round of group games saw a target of 336 achieved with 8 balls to spare. The match featured a century from Sam Billings and a hat-trick for bowler Matt Coles. The final round of games in the group were all washed out by rain and the county progressed into the quarter-finals on net run rate.

Kent lost the quarter-final against Surrey in a rain affected match at The Oval. After bowling Surrey out for 273, a target of 251 from 40 overs was set using the Duckworth-Lewis Method following a heavy rain storm at the start of the Kent innings. Despite a counter-attacking century from Matt Coles, Kent were bowled out for 233.

=== Group B ===
| Pos | Team | Pld | W | L | T | NR | Ded | Pts | NRR |
|---|---|---|---|---|---|---|---|---|---|
| 1 | Nottinghamshire Outlaws | 8 | 5 | 1 | 0 | 2 | 0 | 12 | 0.755 |
| 2 | Essex Eagles | 8 | 4 | 2 | 0 | 2 | 0 | 10 | 0.480 |
| 3 | Hampshire | 8 | 3 | 3 | 0 | 2 | 0 | 9 (Note: The match between Glamorgan and Hampshire was abandoned due to a dangerous pitch (the match was recorded as a 'no result', but Hampshire were awarded 2 points and Glamorgan were docked 2 points).) | 0.554 |
| 4 | Kent Spitfires | 8 | 3 | 3 | 0 | 2 | 0 | 8 | 0.031 |
| 5 | Lancashire Lightning | 8 | 3 | 3 | 0 | 2 | 0 | 8 | −0.034 |
| 6 | Warwickshire Bears | 8 | 3 | 3 | 0 | 2 | 0 | 8 | −0.765 |
| 7 | Middlesex | 8 | 3 | 4 | 0 | 1 | 0 | 7 | −0.224 |
| 8 | Glamorgan | 8 | 2 | 2 | 0 | 4 | 4 | 3 (Note: Glamorgan were docked 2 points before the start of season after preparing an unfit pitch in 2014.) | 0.160 |
| 9 | Sussex Sharks | 8 | 0 | 5 | 0 | 3 | 0 | 3 | −1.063 |

=== Matches ===
| 26 July | Kent (H) | v | Essex | No result (match abandoned without a toss) |
| Scorecard | Kent (H) | v | Essex | Nevill Ground, Tunbridge Wells; Umpires: RJ Bailey and BV Taylor |
| No toss; Points: Kent 1, Essex 1 | | | | Nevill Ground, Tunbridge Wells; Umpires: RJ Bailey and BV Taylor |

| 28 July | Kent; 317/7 (50 overs) | v | (H) Glamorgan; 321/7 (49.4 overs) | Glamorgan won by 3 wickets (with 2 balls remaining) |
| Scorecard | Kent; 317/7 (50 overs) | v | (H) Glamorgan; 321/7 (49.4 overs) | SWALEC Stadium, Cardiff; Umpires: MA Gough and PJ Hartley; Player of the match: CB Cooke (Glamorgan) |
| Scorecard | DI Stevens 110 (72); DA Cosker 2/50 (10 overs) | | CA Ingram 109 (106); MT Coles 3/53 (9 overs) | SWALEC Stadium, Cardiff; Umpires: MA Gough and PJ Hartley; Player of the match: CB Cooke (Glamorgan) |
| Glamorgan won the toss and elected to field; Rain stopped play after 42.2 overs of the Glamorgan innings. No overs were lost.; Points: Glamorgan 2, Kent 0 | | | | SWALEC Stadium, Cardiff; Umpires: MA Gough and PJ Hartley; Player of the match: CB Cooke (Glamorgan) |

| 30 July | Hampshire; 233 (47.5 overs) | v | (H) Kent; 236/5 (43 overs) | Kent won by 5 wickets (with 42 balls remaining) |
| Scorecard | Hampshire; 233 (47.5 overs) | v | (H) Kent; 236/5 (43 overs) | St Lawrence Ground, Canterbury; Umpires: MA Gough and NA Mallender |
| Scorecard | MA Carberry 61 (50); FK Cowdrey 3/32 (10 overs) | | DJ Bell-Drummond 80* (111); FH Edwards 3/47 (10 overs) | St Lawrence Ground, Canterbury; Umpires: MA Gough and NA Mallender |
| Kent won the toss and elected to field; Points: Kent 2, Hampshire 0 | | | | St Lawrence Ground, Canterbury; Umpires: MA Gough and NA Mallender |

| 31 July | Middlesex (H); 260/9 (50 overs) | v | Kent; 173 (41.2 overs) | Middlesex won by 87 runs |
| Scorecard | Middlesex (H); 260/9 (50 overs) | v | Kent; 173 (41.2 overs) | Brunton Memorial Ground, Radlett; Umpires: NGB Cook and SA Garratt |
| Scorecard | NRT Gubbins 56 (64); JC Tredwell 2/24 (10 overs) | | SW Billings 68 (83); OP Rayner 4/45 (10 overs) | Brunton Memorial Ground, Radlett; Umpires: NGB Cook and SA Garratt |
| Middlesex won the toss and elected to bat; Points: Middlesex 2, Kent 0 | | | | Brunton Memorial Ground, Radlett; Umpires: NGB Cook and SA Garratt |

| 2 August | Sussex; 154 (44.3 overs) | v | (H) Kent; 155/2 (30.5 overs) | Kent won by 8 wickets (with 115 balls remaining) |
| Scorecard | Sussex; 154 (44.3 overs) | v | (H) Kent; 155/2 (30.5 overs) | St Lawrence Ground, Canterbury; Umpires: MJD Bodenham and NGB Cook |
| Scorecard | EC Joyce 36 (61); DI Stevens 4/29 (10 overs) | | DJ Bell-Drummond 55* (78); MH Yardy 1/25 (5.5 overs) | St Lawrence Ground, Canterbury; Umpires: MJD Bodenham and NGB Cook |
| Kent won the toss and elected to field; Points: Kent 2, Sussex 0 | | | | St Lawrence Ground, Canterbury; Umpires: MJD Bodenham and NGB Cook |

| 8 August | Lancashire; 258/9 (50 overs) | v | (H) Kent; 207 (37.4 overs) | Lancashire won by 51 runs |
| Scorecard | Lancashire; 258/9 (50 overs) | v | (H) Kent; 207 (37.4 overs) | St Lawrence Ground, Canterbury; Umpires: RJ Evans and SJ O'Shaughnessy |
| Scorecard | LS Livingstone 91 (88); MT Coles 4/34 (10 overs) | | AJ Blake 89 (56); SD Parry 3/60 (10 overs) | St Lawrence Ground, Canterbury; Umpires: RJ Evans and SJ O'Shaughnessy |
| Kent won the toss and elected to field; Points: Kent 0, Lancashire 2 | | | | St Lawrence Ground, Canterbury; Umpires: RJ Evans and SJ O'Shaughnessy |

| 17 August | Nottinghamshire (H); 335 (49.2 overs) | v | Kent; 340/5 (48.4 overs) | Kent won by 5 wickets (with 8 balls remaining) |
| Scorecard | Nottinghamshire (H); 335 (49.2 overs) | v | Kent; 340/5 (48.4 overs) | Trent Bridge, Nottingham; Umpires: PJ Hartley and SJ O'Shaughnessy |
| Scorecard | JWA Taylor 109 (111); ME Claydon 4/66 (10 overs) | | SW Billings 118* (89); BA Hutton 3/72 (10 overs) | Trent Bridge, Nottingham; Umpires: PJ Hartley and SJ O'Shaughnessy |
| Kent won the toss and elected to field; Points: Nottinghamshire 0, Kent 2 | | | | Trent Bridge, Nottingham; Umpires: PJ Hartley and SJ O'Shaughnessy |

| 19 August | Warwickshire (H) | v | Kent | No result (match abandoned with a toss) |
| Scorecard | Warwickshire (H) | v | Kent | Edgbaston Cricket Ground, Birmingham; Umpires: RJ Bailey and GD Lloyd |
| Kent won the toss and elected to field; Points: Warwickshire 1, Kent 1 | | | | Edgbaston Cricket Ground, Birmingham; Umpires: RJ Bailey and GD Lloyd |

=== Quarter-finals ===
| 27 August | Surrey (H); 273 (49.5 overs) | v | Kent; 233 (37.4 overs) | Surrey won by 17 runs (D/L method) |
| Scorecard | Surrey (H); 273 (49.5 overs) | v | Kent; 233 (37.4 overs) | The Oval, Kennington, London; Umpires: MA Gough and MJ Saggers |
| Scorecard | JJ Roy 112 (116); JC Tredwell 3/47 (10 overs) | | MT Coles 100* (73); TK Curran 3/22 (7.4 overs) | The Oval, Kennington, London; Umpires: MA Gough and MJ Saggers |
| Surrey won the toss and elected to bat; Rain reduced the Kent innings to 40 overs with a target of 251 to win; Surrey progressed MT Coles and MD Hunn set a Kent List A record for the 10th wicket, scoring 64 runs | | | | The Oval, Kennington, London; Umpires: MA Gough and MJ Saggers |

== NatWest t20 Blast ==
After a series of good performances, Kent's young team topped the South Group of the 2015 NatWest t20 Blast but went out of the competition at the quarter-final stage to Lancashire. After being bowled out for 142, late wickets led to a "dramatic" finish with Lancashire scoring two runs off the last ball of the match to tie the game with a score of 142/6. Lancashire progressed to the finals day due to losing fewer wickets.

=== South Group ===
| Pos | Team | Pld | W | L | T | NR | Ded | Pts | NRR |
|---|---|---|---|---|---|---|---|---|---|
| 1 | Kent Spitfires | 14 | 9 | 4 | 0 | 1 | 0 | 19 | 0.166 |
| 2 | Sussex Sharks | 14 | 7 | 5 | 0 | 2 | 0 | 16 | 0.206 |
| 3 | Hampshire | 14 | 8 | 6 | 0 | 0 | 0 | 16 | −0.120 |
| 4 | Essex Eagles | 14 | 7 | 6 | 0 | 1 | 0 | 15 | 0.208 |
| 5 | Gloucestershire | 14 | 7 | 7 | 0 | 0 | 0 | 14 | 0.354 |
| 6 | Glamorgan | 14 | 7 | 7 | 0 | 0 | 0 | 14 | −0.522 |
| 7 | Surrey | 14 | 5 | 6 | 0 | 3 | 0 | 13 | −0.145 |
| 8 | Somerset | 14 | 4 | 8 | 0 | 2 | 0 | 10 | −0.184 |
| 9 | Middlesex | 14 | 4 | 9 | 0 | 1 | 0 | 9 | 0.030 |

=== Matches ===
| 15 May | Kent (H); 185/9 (20 overs) | v | Sussex; 178/6 (20 overs) | Kent won by 7 runs |
| Scorecard | Kent (H); 185/9 (20 overs) | v | Sussex; 178/6 (20 overs) | St Lawrence Ground, Canterbury; Umpires: NL Bainton and NJ Llong; Player of the match: OE Robinson (Sussex) |
| Scorecard | SW Billings 46 (28); OE Robinson 3/35 (4 overs) | | CD Nash 61 (45); ME Claydon 2/29 (4 overs) | St Lawrence Ground, Canterbury; Umpires: NL Bainton and NJ Llong; Player of the match: OE Robinson (Sussex) |
| Kent won the toss and elected to bat; Points: Kent 2, Sussex 0 | | | | St Lawrence Ground, Canterbury; Umpires: NL Bainton and NJ Llong; Player of the match: OE Robinson (Sussex) |

| 20 May | Hampshire (H); 172/6 (20 overs) | v | Kent; 178/5 (19.2 overs) | Kent won by 5 wickets (with 4 balls remaining) |
| Scorecard | Hampshire (H); 172/6 (20 overs) | v | Kent; 178/5 (19.2 overs) | Ageas Bowl, Southampton; Umpires: RJ Bailey and RT Robinson; Player of the match: AJ Blake (Kent) |
| Scorecard | JM Vince 66 (43); DA Griffiths 2/36 (4 overs) | | AJ Blake 71* (30); WR Smith 3/24 (4 overs) | Ageas Bowl, Southampton; Umpires: RJ Bailey and RT Robinson; Player of the match: AJ Blake (Kent) |
| Hampshire won the toss and elected to bat; Points: Hampshire 0, Kent 2 | | | | Ageas Bowl, Southampton; Umpires: RJ Bailey and RT Robinson; Player of the match: AJ Blake (Kent) |

| 28 May | Middlesex (H); 205/5 (20 overs) | v | Kent; 90 (14.4 overs) | Middlesex won by 115 runs |
| Scorecard | Middlesex (H); 205/5 (20 overs) | v | Kent; 90 (14.4 overs) | Lord's, St John's Wood, London; Umpires: SA Garratt and AG Wharf; Player of the match: PR Stirling (Middlesex) |
| Scorecard | PR Stirling 90 (50); DI Stevens 2/44 (4 overs) | | SA Northeast 20 (22); JEC Franklin 5/21 (4 overs) | Lord's, St John's Wood, London; Umpires: SA Garratt and AG Wharf; Player of the match: PR Stirling (Middlesex) |
| Middlesex won the toss and elected to bat; Points: Middlesex 2, Kent 0 | | | | Lord's, St John's Wood, London; Umpires: SA Garratt and AG Wharf; Player of the match: PR Stirling (Middlesex) |

| 29 May | Kent (H); 193/8 (20 overs) | v | Surrey; 170/8 (20 overs) | Kent won by 23 runs |
| Scorecard | Kent (H); 193/8 (20 overs) | v | Surrey; 170/8 (20 overs) | County Ground, Beckenham; Umpires: BJ Debenham and MA Gough; Player of the match: SA Northeast (Kent) |
| Scorecard | SA Northeast 96 (47); TK Curran 3/31 (4 overs) | | MC Henriques 63 (47); MT Coles 2/36 (4 overs) | County Ground, Beckenham; Umpires: BJ Debenham and MA Gough; Player of the match: SA Northeast (Kent) |
| Kent won the toss and elected to bat; Points: Kent 2, Surrey 0 | | | | County Ground, Beckenham; Umpires: BJ Debenham and MA Gough; Player of the match: SA Northeast (Kent) |

| 31 May | Kent; 227/7 (20 overs) | v | (H) Somerset; 224/7 (20 overs) | Kent won by 3 runs |
| Scorecard | Kent; 227/7 (20 overs) | v | (H) Somerset; 224/7 (20 overs) | County Ground, Taunton; Umpires: RJ Evans and JW Lloyds; Player of the match: CH Gayle (Somerset) |
| Scorecard | SA Northeast 114 (58); AC Thomas 3/46 (4 overs) | | CH Gayle 151* (62); ME Claydon 2/23 (4 overs) | County Ground, Taunton; Umpires: RJ Evans and JW Lloyds; Player of the match: CH Gayle (Somerset) |
| Kent won the toss and elected to bat; Points: Somerset 0, Kent 2 | | | | County Ground, Taunton; Umpires: RJ Evans and JW Lloyds; Player of the match: CH Gayle (Somerset) |

| 5 June | Kent (H); 156/6 (20 overs) | v | Gloucestershire; 157/1 (17.2 overs) | Gloucestershire won by 9 wickets (with 14 balls remaining) |
| Scorecard | Kent (H); 156/6 (20 overs) | v | Gloucestershire; 157/1 (17.2 overs) | County Ground, Beckenham; Umpires: MJD Bodenham and BJ Debenham; Player of the match: BAC Howell (Gloucestershire) |
| Scorecard | DJ Bell-Drummond 31 (24); BAC Howell 3/18 (4 overs) | | M Klinger 69* (51); ME Claydon 1/21 (2.2 overs) | County Ground, Beckenham; Umpires: MJD Bodenham and BJ Debenham; Player of the match: BAC Howell (Gloucestershire) |
| Kent won the toss and elected to bat; Points: Kent 0, Gloucestershire 2 | | | | County Ground, Beckenham; Umpires: MJD Bodenham and BJ Debenham; Player of the match: BAC Howell (Gloucestershire) |

| 12 June | Kent (H); 183/5 (18 overs) | v | Hampshire; 187/4 (17.5 overs) | Hampshire won by 6 wickets (with 1 ball remaining) |
| Scorecard | Kent (H); 183/5 (18 overs) | v | Hampshire; 187/4 (17.5 overs) | St Lawrence Ground, Canterbury; Umpires: NL Bainton and GD Lloyd; Player of the match: JM Vince (Hampshire) |
| Scorecard | SA Northeast 54 (33); FH Edwards 2/41 (4 overs) | | JM Vince 99* (57); MT Coles 2/44 (4 overs) | St Lawrence Ground, Canterbury; Umpires: NL Bainton and GD Lloyd; Player of the match: JM Vince (Hampshire) |
| Kent won the toss and elected to bat; Match reduced to 18 overs per side before play began due to rain; Points: Kent 0, Hampshire 2 | | | | St Lawrence Ground, Canterbury; Umpires: NL Bainton and GD Lloyd; Player of the match: JM Vince (Hampshire) |

| 18 June | Essex; 173/6 (20 overs) | v | (H) Kent; 174/4 (19.1 overs) | Kent won by 6 wickets (with 5 balls remaining) |
| Scorecard | Essex; 173/6 (20 overs) | v | (H) Kent; 174/4 (19.1 overs) | St Lawrence Ground, Canterbury; Umpires: NL Bainton and NGC Cowley; Player of the match: SA Northeast (Kent) |
| Scorecard | ML Pettini 56 (45); MT Coles 2/28 (4 overs) | | SA Northeast 90 (52); GR Napier 1/17 (2 overs) | St Lawrence Ground, Canterbury; Umpires: NL Bainton and NGC Cowley; Player of the match: SA Northeast (Kent) |
| Kent won the toss and elected to field; Points: Kent 2, Essex 0 | | | | St Lawrence Ground, Canterbury; Umpires: NL Bainton and NGC Cowley; Player of the match: SA Northeast (Kent) |

| 19 June | Kent; 231/7 (20 overs) | v | (H) Surrey; 177 (19.1 overs) | Kent won by 54 runs |
| Scorecard | Kent; 231/7 (20 overs) | v | (H) Surrey; 177 (19.1 overs) | The Oval, Kennington, London; Umpires: RJ Bailey and JW Lloyds; Player of the match: DI Stevens (Kent) |
| Scorecard | DI Stevens 90 (39); TE Linley 4/45 (4 overs) | | GC Wilson 55 (36); DI Stevens 4/39 (4 overs) | The Oval, Kennington, London; Umpires: RJ Bailey and JW Lloyds; Player of the match: DI Stevens (Kent) |
| Kent won the toss and elected to bat; Points: Surrey 0, Kent 2 | | | | The Oval, Kennington, London; Umpires: RJ Bailey and JW Lloyds; Player of the match: DI Stevens (Kent) |

| 3 July | Sussex (H); 136/8 (20 overs) | v | Kent; 137/3 (14.2 overs) | Kent won by 7 wickets (with 34 balls remaining) |
| Scorecard | Sussex (H); 136/8 (20 overs) | v | Kent; 137/3 (14.2 overs) | County Ground, Hove; Umpires: PJ Hartley and DJ Millns; Player of the match: AJ Blake (Kent) |
| Scorecard | MW Machan 39 (32); ME Claydon 3/40 (4 overs) | | AJ Blake 52* (32); OE Robinson 2/22 (2.2 overs) | County Ground, Hove; Umpires: PJ Hartley and DJ Millns; Player of the match: AJ Blake (Kent) |
| Kent won the toss and elected to field; Points: Sussex 0, Kent 2 | | | | County Ground, Hove; Umpires: PJ Hartley and DJ Millns; Player of the match: AJ Blake (Kent) |

| 10 July | Kent (H); 173/6 (20 overs) | v | Somerset; 151/9 (20 overs) | Kent won by 22 runs |
| Scorecard | Kent (H); 173/6 (20 overs) | v | Somerset; 151/9 (20 overs) | St Lawrence Ground, Canterbury; Umpires: PJ Hartley and AG Wharf; Player of the match: DJ Bell-Drummond (Kent) |
| Scorecard | DJ Bell-Drummond 77 (51); AC Thomas 3/28 (4 overs) | | J Overton 31 (19); CJ Haggett 2/12 (2 overs) | St Lawrence Ground, Canterbury; Umpires: PJ Hartley and AG Wharf; Player of the match: DJ Bell-Drummond (Kent) |
| Somerset won the toss and elected to field; Points: Kent 2, Somerset 0 | | | | St Lawrence Ground, Canterbury; Umpires: PJ Hartley and AG Wharf; Player of the match: DJ Bell-Drummond (Kent) |

| 12 July | Gloucestershire (H); 166/7 (20 overs) | v | Kent; 170/7 (19.4 overs) | Kent won by 3 wickets (with 2 balls remaining) |
| Scorecard | Gloucestershire (H); 166/7 (20 overs) | v | Kent; 170/7 (19.4 overs) | College Ground, Cheltenham; Umpires: JH Evans and JW Lloyds; Player of the match: AJ Blake (Kent) |
| Scorecard | M Klinger 75 (58); ME Claydon 3/27 (4 overs) | | AJ Blake 59* (24); CN Miles 3/27 (4 overs) | College Ground, Cheltenham; Umpires: JH Evans and JW Lloyds; Player of the match: AJ Blake (Kent) |
| Kent won the toss and elected to field; Points: Gloucestershire 0, Kent 2 | | | | College Ground, Cheltenham; Umpires: JH Evans and JW Lloyds; Player of the match: AJ Blake (Kent) |

| 19 July | Glamorgan; 179/7 (20 overs) | v | (H) Kent; 178/8 (20 overs) | Glamorgan won by 1 run |
| Scorecard | Glamorgan; 179/7 (20 overs) | v | (H) Kent; 178/8 (20 overs) | Nevill Ground, Tunbridge Wells; Umpires: NGB Cook and PR Pollard; Player of the match: GG Wagg (Glamorgan) |
| Scorecard | GG Wagg 53* (28); MD Hunn 3/30 (4 overs) | | JL Denly 70 (36); MG Hogan 3/40 (4 overs) | Nevill Ground, Tunbridge Wells; Umpires: NGB Cook and PR Pollard; Player of the match: GG Wagg (Glamorgan) |
| Glamorgan won the toss and elected to bat; Points: Kent 0, Glamorgan 2 | | | | Nevill Ground, Tunbridge Wells; Umpires: NGB Cook and PR Pollard; Player of the match: GG Wagg (Glamorgan) |

| 24 July | Essex (H) | v | Kent | No result (match abandoned without a toss) |
| Scorecard | Essex (H) | v | Kent | County Ground, Chelmsford; Umpires: PK Baldwin and RK Illingworth |
| Points: Essex 1, Kent 1 | | | | County Ground, Chelmsford; Umpires: PK Baldwin and RK Illingworth |

=== Quarter-finals ===
| 15 August | Kent (H); 142 (20 overs) | v | Lancashire; 142/6 (20 overs) | Match tied |
| Scorecard | Kent (H); 142 (20 overs) | v | Lancashire; 142/6 (20 overs) | St Lawrence Ground, Canterbury; Umpires: NGB Cook and MA Gough; Player of the match: JC Buttler |
| Scorecard | JC Tredwell 31* (18); SD Parry 3/31 (4 overs) | | AG Prince 62 (50); MT Coles 3/22 (4 overs) | St Lawrence Ground, Canterbury; Umpires: NGB Cook and MA Gough; Player of the match: JC Buttler |
| Lancashire won the toss and elected to field; Lancashire progressed due to losing fewer wickets | | | | St Lawrence Ground, Canterbury; Umpires: NGB Cook and MA Gough; Player of the match: JC Buttler |

== MCCU match ==
Kent played a three-day match, without first-class status, against Loughborough MCC University before the start of the County Championship season.

| 12–14 April | Kent (H) | v | Loughborough MCCU | Match drawn |
| Scorecard | 394/7d (82.2 overs); DJ Bell-Drummond 134 (156); SG Whittingham 2/63 (13 overs) | | 409/9d (113.0 overs); NR Kumar 119 (122); IAA Thomas 3/59 (19 overs) | St Lawrence Ground, Canterbury; Umpires: NL Bainton and MJD Bodenham |
| Scorecard | 364/8d (74 overs); DI Stevens 100 (74); SG Whittingham 4/86 (14 overs) | | | St Lawrence Ground, Canterbury; Umpires: NL Bainton and MJD Bodenham |
Kent won the toss and elected to bat; Match did not have first-class status

== Statistics ==
Sam Northeast and Joe Denly both made over a thousand runs in first-class cricket in 2015 with Denly making the highest score for the county. Daniel Bell-Drummond scored three first-class centuries during the season and led the team in List A runs. Northeast scored a county record high score of 114 runs in the Twenty20 competition.

Matt Coles led the bowling statistics with 100 wickets across all competitions during the season, including 67 in first-class matches. Coles took a hat-trick in the Royal London One Day Cup quarter final loss to Surrey. Mitchell Claydon led the Twenty20 bowling statistics.
