= Alex Blake (cricketer) =

English cricketer (born 1989)

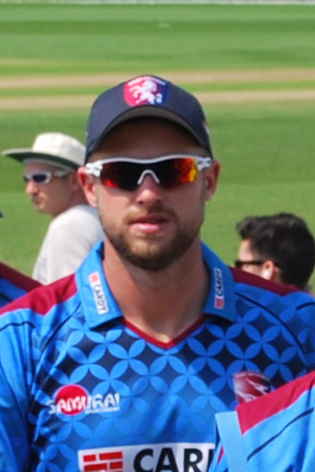
- Blake playing for Kent at Beckenham in 2016

Personal information
- Full name: Alexander James Blake
- Born: 25 January 1989 (age 37); Farnborough, London
- Batting: Left-handed
- Bowling: Right-arm medium-fast Right-arm off-spin

Domestic team information
- Years: Team
- 2007–2023: Kent (squad no. 10)
- 2021: Oval Invincibles
- 2022/23: Kathmandu Knights
- 2022/23: Dhaka Dominators
- 2023: Cornwall
- FC debut: 28 April 2008 Kent v New Zealanders
- LA debut: 4 September 2007 Kent v Surrey

Career statistics
Competition	FC	LA	T20
Matches	47	124	159
Runs scored	1,560	2,629	2,257
Batting average	22.94	30.56	20.51
100s/50s	1/6	1/16	0/10
Top score	105*	116	71*
Balls bowled	222	264	78
Wickets	3	5	1
Bowling average	52.66	55.40	96.00
5 wickets in innings	0	0	0
10 wickets in match	0	0	0
Best bowling	2/9	2/13	1/17
Catches/stumpings	26/–	68/–	89/–
- Source: Cricinfo, 8 October 2023

Alexander James Blake (born 25 January 1989) is an English professional cricketer who played for Kent County Cricket Club between 2007 and 2023. He played as a left-handed batsman who bowled occasionally. Blake was born in Farnborough in Bromley and attended Hayes School before studying at Leeds Metropolitan University.

== Cricket career ==
Blake was a member of the Kent Cricket Academy and played for the county at age group level before making his debut for the Kent Second XI in 2005. He was part of the England under-19 team which played in an invitational tri-series in January and February 2007 in Kuala Lumpur. Blake made four under-19 One Day International appearances during the tournament against the Malaysia under-19s and Sri Lanka under-19s.

Blake made his List A cricket debut for Kent in the 2007 NatWest Pro40 against Surrey in September 2007, before going on to make his first-class cricket debut for Kent against the touring New Zealanders in April 2008. He broke into the County Championship team in 2010 and scored his maiden County Championship century against Yorkshire in the final Championship match of the season.

In 2015 he scored three half-centuries in Twenty 20 matches, including his best score of 71 not out, scored in 30 balls against Hampshire. Blake scored another two half-centuries in the 2015 Royal London One-Day Cup and recorded a batting average of 62 in the competition. After attracting attention from Sussex, he was awarded a new contract at the end of the 2015 season and won Kent's One-Day Player of the Year award.

After only making one first-class appearance during 2015, Blake returned to the Kent County Championship team during the 2016 season, making eight appearances. He hit three sixes from the only balls he faced to complete a Championship win against Derbyshire in May and hit 66 not out against Surrey in the One-Day Cup, scoring a six from the penultimate ball of the match to secure the win for Kent.

In January 2020, Blake signed a new white-ball contract with Kent, becoming the first homegrown player to sign such a deal with the county. After the 2023 season, his contract was not renewed by Kent, bringing to an end a 17-year professional career with Kent.
