= Sam Northeast =

English cricketer

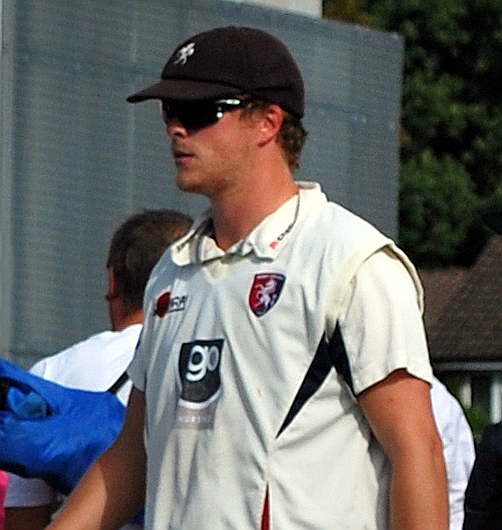
- Northeast in 2016 whilst captaining Kent at Beckenham

Personal information
- Full name: Sam Alexander Northeast
- Born: 16 October 1989 (age 37); Ashford, Kent, England
- Height: 5 ft 11 in (1.80 m)
- Batting: Right-handed
- Bowling: Right-arm off break
- Role: Batsman

Domestic team information
- Years: Team
- 2007–2017: Kent (squad no. 17)
- 2018–2021: Hampshire (squad no. 17)
- 2021: → Yorkshire (on loan) (squad no. 2)
- 2021: → Nottinghamshire (on loan) (squad no. 30)
- 2022–2025: Glamorgan
- 2026–: Kent
- FC debut: 19 September 2007 Kent v Durham
- LA debut: 16 July 2007 Kent v Sri Lanka A

Career statistics
Competition	FC	LA	T20
Matches	250	126	162
Runs scored	15,451	3,862	4,007
Batting average	39.92	37.13	30.58
100s/50s	37/71	6/23	1/28
Top score	410*	177*	114
Balls bowled	240	–	–
Wickets	1	–	–
Bowling average	202.00	–	–
5 wickets in innings	0	–	–
10 wickets in match	0	–	–
Best bowling	1/60	–	–
Catches/stumpings	138/–	45/–	48/–
- Source: ESPNcricinfo, 27 September 2026

Sam Alexander Northeast (born 16 October 1989) is an English professional cricketer who plays for Kent County Cricket Club. He is a right-handed batsman. Northeast made his senior debut in 2007 and until 2017 played for Kent County Cricket Club. He captained the Kent First XI for most of the 2015 season before being formally appointed as club captain in 2016. He captained the team in 2017 before being replaced in the season of 2018, after not signing for a contract extension committing himself to the club in the longer term.

After signing for Hampshire in February 2018, Northeast made his debut for the England Lions later in the month against the West Indies A in Antigua. In July 2022, Northeast scored 410 not out in a first-class innings.

== Early life ==
Northeast was born in Ashford in Kent in 1989 and grew up in Walmer near Dover. He first came to prominence when, as a 13-year-old schoolboy, he scored 19 hundreds during 2003, 11 for Wellesley House School in Broadstairs, more than doubling the record for runs scored in a season for the school, which had been set by Graham Cowdrey in 1977. He went on to Harrow School on a sports scholarship, winning a place in the 1st XI at the age of 14 and becoming one of the youngest players to play in the Eton v Harrow match at Lord's and the youngest for 60 years to do so. Kent County Cricket Club sent coaches to work with him at school rather than asking him to travel to Canterbury. He was part of the Harrow cricket team, which was touring in Sri Lanka when the 2004 Indian Ocean tsunami struck, escaping injury by climbing onto the roof of the pavilion at Galle.

In 2005, Northeast won seven national cricket awards, including the BBC Test Match Special young cricketer of the year and the Gray-Nicolls best schools cricketer awards. He won a Bunbury scholarship and played for England under-15s. An all-round sportsman, Northeast was a national schools rackets champion, a county squash player and cross-country runner, and was offered county trials in football and rugby union. He turned down trials with the England Independent Schools football team and held Kent age-group records in the 400 metres and long jump.

== Cricket career ==
Northeast played for Kent County Cricket Club from 2007 to 2017, captaining the club in 2016 and 2017. In 2005 he made his 2nd XI debut against Derbyshire Second XI, scoring 96. In 2006 he was included in a John Paul Getty XI against the touring Sri Lankans, top scoring with 62 not out against a strong Sri Lankan team containing international bowlers. In July 2007, he scored a hundred for Harrow against Eton at Lord's.

Northeast made his Kent first team debut in a List A cricket match against a touring Sri Lanka A team in July 2007, although the match was abandoned before he had the chance to bat. He went on to make his first-class cricket debut for Kent on 19 September 2007 in their final County Championship game of the season, against Durham at the St Lawrence Ground.

In July 2009, Northeast showed good form for England Under 19s against Bangladesh. In the 2nd Under-19 Test match at Derby he scored 107 in the first innings and 149 in the second innings. He followed this with scores of 123, 41 and 62 in the One Day Internationals, top scoring on each occasion.

In 2012, Northeast scored 880 runs at an average of 55, despite at times being relegated to the 2nd XI. He was awarded his county cap in August and was named Kent's Batsman of the Year after scoring over 1400 runs in all competitions. At the end of the season he signed a new contract for a further year. He scored his first limited over century on 20 June 2013, making 115 against the Sussex Sharks, in a world record run chase in a 40 over match.

Northeast was appointed Kent's vice-captain in 2014 and acted as the on-field captain for the team throughout most of the 2015 season, including in all one-day matches. He was touted as a future captain by former Kent captain David Fulton and Darren Stevens. He scored 2,007 runs in all formats and was chosen in the Professional Cricketers' Association Team of 2015.

Northeast was appointed as Kent club captain on 30 September 2015. After leading the county in first-class runs in 2016 he was selected to captain the MCC team for the 2017 Champion County match and was selected for the South team in the North v South pre-season series in the United Arab Emirates.

After the end of the 2017 season, Northeast's position as captain at Kent began to be questioned. The county's Cricket Committee met in January 2018 and opted to replace him as club captain with Sam Billings, concerned that Northeast was unwilling to sign a contract extension which would have committed him to the club beyond the end of the 2018 season. Northeast requested permission to speak to other counties and was allowed to do so. He was not selected for Kent's squad for the 2017–18 Regional Super50 competition in the West Indies, with the expectation being that he would leave the county before the start of the 2018 season.

He joined Hampshire in February 2018. At the 2018 Royal London One-Day Cup final, he was booed by Kent fans.

== Glamorgan ==
In July 2022, in the County Championship match against Leicestershire, Northeast scored his maiden double century in first-class cricket, turning it into his maiden triple century. Northeast finished on 410 not out to become the first batsman to score 400 runs in a first-class innings since Brian Lara made 400 not out for the West Indies against England in April 2004.

He was named Glamorgan captain in the county championship ahead of the 2024 season.

In April 2024, he scored 335 not out, the highest score in first-class cricket at Lord's.

After four seasons with Glamorgan, Northeast rejoined Kent on a two-year contract.

Sporting positions
Preceded by Rob Key	Kent County Cricket Club captain 2016–2017	Succeeded by Sam Billings
