= Mark Davies (cricketer, born 1980) =

English cricketer

Personal information
- Full name: Anthony Mark Davies
- Born: 4 October 1980 (age 46); Stockton-on-Tees, England
- Nickname: Davo, Bob
- Height: 6 ft 3 in (1.91 m)
- Batting: Right-handed
- Bowling: Right-arm medium
- Role: Bowler

Domestic team information
- Years: Team
- 1998–2011: Durham (squad no. 4)
- 2007: Nottinghamshire
- 2012–2014: Kent (squad no. 31)
- First-class debut: 13 April 2002 Durham v Durham UCCE
- List A debut: 13 September 1998 Durham v Surrey

Career statistics
Competition	FC	LA	T20
Matches	109	90	20
Runs scored	1,118	170	26
Batting average	12.56	7.39	5.20
100s/50s	0/2	0/0	0/0
Top score	62	31*	13
Balls bowled	16,386	3,704	468
Wickets	315	86	17
Bowling average	22.42	30.48	30.82
5 wickets in innings	13	0	0
10 wickets in match	2	0	0
Best bowling	8/24	4/13	2/14
Catches/stumpings	21/–	14/–	4/–
- Source: CricInfo, 20 May 2017

Mark Davies (born Anthony Mark Davies, 4 October 1980) is an English former first-class cricketer who played for Durham County Cricket Club and, briefly, Kent County Cricket Club. He bowled right-arm medium-pace and batted in the tail.

In December 2009, he was called up from the England Lions into the full England squad, to cover for injuries to other bowlers during the tour of South Africa. Davies suffered many injuries during his career. In September 2014, he was forced to retire from all forms of cricket after failing to recover from a shoulder injury picked up in a pre-season fixture.

== County career ==
Born in Stockton-on-Tees, County Durham, England, Davies made his List A debut in 1998, and his first-class debut in 2002. He has represented England under-19s.

His career has been blighted by injury, "especially in 2004 and 2005 when he was taking wickets for fun (50 at 18.76 and 47 at 15.55 respectively)."

He rarely played in 2006, as recurring back problems left him in a "body brace" for three months, but made a comeback in 2007, including a one-month spell on loan to Nottinghamshire, playing one first-class game. In the 2008 season, he played regularly for Durham in the early season and, returning to the side after two months on the sidelines in August 2008 after Steve Harmison was called up for England, Davies took career-best figures of 8–24 versus Hampshire, at Basingstoke as Hampshire were dismissed for just 96. He took 3–51 in the second innings, 11–75 in all, but could not prevent his side from losing.

He joined Kent in 2012. In his first season with the county, he won the player of the year. 2013 was a different proposition altogether for Davies as he found himself left out for much of Kent's season. Despite that, he claimed 25 County Championship wickets. This was the fourth best in the squad, despite having missed 6 games.

Davies retired from cricket in 2014, due to a shoulder injury.

=== Career-best performances ===
	Batting				Bowling (innings)			
	Score	Fixture	Venue	Season	Figures	Fixture	Venue	Season
First-class	62	Durham v Somerset	Stockton-on-Tees	2005	8/24	Durham v Hampshire	Basingstoke	2008
List A	31 not out	Durham v Warwickshire	Chester-le-Street	2002	4/13	Durham v Sussex	Chester-le-Street	2001
Twenty20	13	Kent v Sussex	Hove	2012	2/14	Durham v Yorkshire	Chester-le-Street	2004

== Personal life ==
His brother, Andrew, is a professional footballer who has played for clubs such as Middlesbrough, Bradford City and Ross County FC.
