= Ben Harmison =

English cricketer (born 1986)

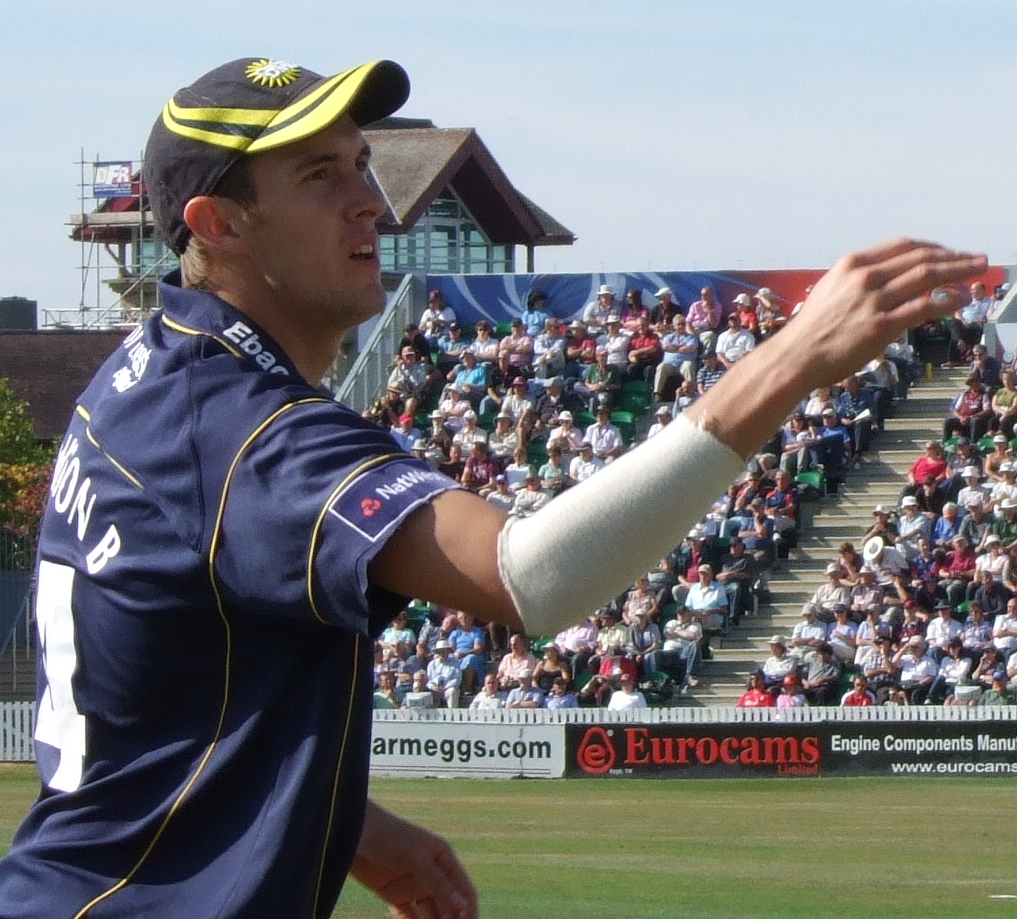
- Harmison in 2009

Personal information
- Full name: Ben William Harmison
- Born: 9 January 1986 (age 40); Ashington, Northumberland
- Nickname: Harmy
- Height: 6 ft 6 in (1.98 m)
- Batting: Left-handed
- Bowling: Right-arm medium-fast
- Role: Batting all-rounder
- Relatives: Steve Harmison (brother)

Domestic team information
- Years: Team
- 2005–2011: Durham
- 2011–2015: Kent (squad no. 21)
- FC debut: 31 May 2006 Durham v Oxford UCCE
- Last FC: 1 September 2015 Kent v Lancashire
- LA debut: 7 August 2005 Durham v Bangladesh A
- Last LA: 4 September 2014 Kent v Warwickshire

Career statistics
Competition	FC	LA	T20
Matches	85	69	44
Runs scored	3,501	1,177	200
Batting average	28.23	23.54	12.50
100s/50s	7/15	0/3	0/0
Top score	125	67	24
Balls bowled	2,104	1,017	438
Wickets	37	30	30
Bowling average	40.86	32.10	21.30
5 wickets in innings	0	0	0
10 wickets in match	0	0	0
Best bowling	4/27	3/40	3/20
Catches/stumpings	53/–	24/–	15/–
- Source: CricInfo, 16 September 2015

Ben William Harmison (born 9 January 1986) is an English former professional cricketer who played first-class cricket for Durham and Kent. The former England Under-19 left-handed batsman scored a century on his first-class debut in 2006 while playing for Durham against Oxford UCCE. He finished the season with 563 runs at an average of 37.53 with two hundreds, though both hundreds came in games outside the County Championship. He hit his maiden Championship century, 101 against Warwickshire in 2007.

On 19 December 2011, Harmison signed for Kent after being released by Durham in September. He played for Kent until the end of the 2015 season before leaving the county in February 2016 after four seasons. He played in Australia for Newcastle City Cricket Club in New South Wales during the English off-season.

He also plays football, as a striker, joining the Ashington team managed by his older brother Steve at the end of the 2016 cricket season, although he had also played for Ashington during his cricket career. He scored on his full debut in September 2015 in the F.A. Vase win over Easington Colliery.
