= 2015 One-Day Cup =

2015 Royal London One-Day Cup
- Dates: 25 July – 19 September 2015
- Administrator: England and Wales Cricket Board
- Cricket format: Limited overs cricket (50 overs)
- Tournament format(s): Group stage and knockout
- Champions: Gloucestershire
- Participants: 18
- Matches: 79
- Most runs: 531 Michael Klinger (Gloucestershire)
- Most wickets: 20 Reece Topley (Essex)
- Official website: ecb.co.uk

The 2015 Royal London One-Day Cup tournament was the scheduled limited overs cricket competition for 2015 season of England and Wales first-class counties. It was won by Gloucestershire, who defeated Surrey by the narrow margin of six runs, despite a hat-trick from Jade Dernbach, in what was described as 'a thrilling finish'. The title was Gloucestershire's first trophy since the 2004 Cheltenham & Gloucester Trophy, when they defeated a Worcestershire side that included 2015 Surrey captain Gareth Batty.

== Format ==
The competition consisted of two groups of nine teams, with the top four teams from each group progress to the quarter-finals. The groups for the 2015 season were drawn and are shown below in their respective groups.

| Group A | Group B |
|---|---|
| Surrey | Kent Spitfires |
| Derbyshire Falcons | Hampshire |
| Worcestershire | Sussex Sharks |
| Yorkshire Vikings | Essex Eagles |
| Northamptonshire Steelbacks | Lancashire Lightning |
| Leicestershire Foxes | Middlesex |
| Gloucestershire | Nottinghamshire Outlaws |
| Somerset | Warwickshire Bears |
| Durham | Glamorgan |

== Group stage ==
=== Group A ===
==== Table ====
| Pos | Team | Pld | W | L | T | NR | Ded | Pts | NRR |
|---|---|---|---|---|---|---|---|---|---|
| 1 | Surrey | 8 | 6 | 1 | 0 | 1 | 0 | 13 | 1.079 |
| 2 | Gloucestershire | 8 | 5 | 2 | 0 | 1 | 0 | 11 | 0.069 |
| 3 | Yorkshire Vikings | 8 | 4 | 2 | 0 | 2 | 0 | 10 | 0.536 |
| 4 | Durham | 8 | 4 | 3 | 0 | 1 | 0 | 9 | 0.402 |
| 5 | Northamptonshire Steelbacks | 8 | 4 | 3 | 0 | 1 | 0 | 9 | −0.458 |
| 6 | Somerset | 8 | 4 | 4 | 0 | 0 | 0 | 8 | 0.814 |
| 7 | Derbyshire Falcons | 8 | 4 | 4 | 0 | 0 | 0 | 8 | 0.151 |
| 8 | Worcestershire | 8 | 1 | 6 | 0 | 1 | 0 | 3 | −0.629 |
| 9 | Leicestershire Foxes | 8 | 0 | 7 | 0 | 1 | 0 | 1 | −1.914 |

==== Fixtures ====
25 July
Scorecard

| Durham; 313/8 (50 overs) | v | Northamptonshire Steelbacks (H); 259 (46.2 overs) |

Durham won by 54 runs
The County Ground, Northampton

26 July
Scorecard

| Leicestershire Foxes (H) | v | Surrey |

Match abandoned
Grace Road, Leicester

26 July
Scorecard

| Derbyshire Falcons; 134/7 (14 overs) | v | Somerset (H); 74 (10 overs) |

Derbyshire won by 29 runs (D/L method)
The County Ground, Taunton

26 July
Scorecard

| Yorkshire Vikings (H); 227 (50 overs) | v | Gloucestershire; 5/0 (2 overs) |

No result
North Marine Road, Scarborough

27 July
Scorecard

| Durham (H) | v | Worcestershire |

Match abandoned
Emirates Durham ICG, Chester-le-Street

27 July
Scorecard

| Yorkshire Vikings; 239/6 (42 overs) | v | (H) Derbyshire Falcons; 189/9 (29 overs) |

Yorkshire won by 7 runs (D/L method)
The 3aaa County Ground, Derbyshire

27 July
Scorecard

| Surrey (H); 343/5 (50 overs) | v | Northamptonshire Steelbacks; 123 (24 overs) |

Surrey won by 220 runs
The Kia Oval, London

29 July
Scorecard

| Derbyshire Falcons; 274/5 (48 overs) | v | (H) Gloucestershire; 205/4 (35 overs) |

Gloucestershire won by 6 wickets (D/L method)
The County Ground, Bristol

29 July
Scorecard

| Somerset (H); 327/8 (50 overs) | v | Durham; 331/3 (46.3 overs) |

Durham won by 7 wickets
The County Ground, Taunton

29 July
Scorecard

| Surrey (H); 265/8 (50 overs) | v | Yorkshire Vikings; 259/7 (50 overs) |

Surrey won by 6 runs
The Kia Oval, London

29 July
Scorecard

| Northamptonshire Steelbacks (H); 244/9 (50 overs) | v | Leicestershire Foxes; 189 (44.3 overs) |

Northamptonshire won by 55 runs
The County Ground, Northampton

30 July
Scorecard

| Yorkshire Vikings; 345/6 (50 overs) | v | (H) Worcestershire; 212 (41.3 overs) |

Yorkshire won by 133 runs
New Road, Worcester

31 July
Scorecard

| Surrey; 271/7 (50 overs) | v | (H) Durham; 222 (46.3 overs) |

Surrey won by 49 runs
Emirates Durham ICG, Chester-le-Street

31 July
Scorecard

| Gloucestershire; 315/6 (50 overs) | v | (H) Leicestershire Foxes; 314 (50 overs) |

Gloucestershire won by 1 run
Grace Road, Leicester

31 July
Scorecard

| Somerset (H); 305/7 (50 overs) | v | Worcestershire; 249 (45.2 overs) |

Somerset won by 56 runs
The County Ground, Taunton

31 July
Scorecard

| Northamptonshire Steelbacks; 231 (50 overs) | v | (H) Derbyshire Falcons; 232/3 (48.2 overs) |

Derbyshire won by 7 wickets
The 3aaa County Ground, Derbyshire

2 August
Scorecard

| Durham (H); 224/7 (43 overs) | v | Yorkshire Vikings; 130/2 (24.3 overs) |

Yorkshire won by 32 runs (D/L method)
Emirates Durham ICG, Chester-le-Street

2 August
Scorecard

| Somerset; 244/7 (50 overs) | v | (H) Gloucestershire; 247/7 (49.4 overs) |

Gloucestershire won by 3 wickets
The County Ground, Bristol

2 August
Scorecard

| Surrey (H); 326/6 (50 overs) | v | Derbyshire Falcons; 249 (41.5 overs) |

Surrey won by 77 runs
Woodbridge Road, Guildford

2 August
Scorecard

| Northamptonshire Steelbacks; 126 (35.1 overs) | v | (H) Worcestershire; 105 (31 overs) |

Northamptonshire won by 21 runs
New Road, Worcester

3 August
Scorecard

| Yorkshire Vikings (H); 277/9 (50 overs) | v | Leicestershire Foxes; 246 (49.5 overs) |

Yorkshire won by 31 runs
Headingley, Leeds

3 August
Scorecard

| Somerset; 247/8 (50 overs) | v | (H) Northamptonshire Steelbacks; 249/6 (49 overs) |

Northamptonshire won by 4 wickets
The County Ground, Northampton

4 August
Scorecard

| Gloucestershire (H); 289/7 (41 overs) | v | Durham; 214 (40.1 overs) |

Gloucestershire won by 71 runs (D/L method)
The County Ground, Bristol

4 August
Scorecard

| Leicestershire Foxes; 156 (41 overs) | v | (H) Derbyshire Falcons; 159/4 (30.5 overs) |

Derbyshire won by 6 wickets
The 3aaa County Ground, Derbyshire

4 August
Scorecard

| Surrey (H); 328/7 (50 overs) | v | Worcestershire; 292 (46.4 overs) |

Surrey won by 36 runs
The Kia Oval, London

5 August
Scorecard

| Worcestershire (H); 264/8 (46 overs) | v | Gloucestershire; 265/6 (44.5 overs) |

Gloucestershire won by 4 wickets (D/L method)
New Road, Worcester

5 August
Scorecard

| Yorkshire Vikings (H); 175 (49.5 overs) | v | Somerset; 178/4 (38.1 overs) |

Somerset won by 6 wickets
North Marine Road, Scarborough

6 August
Scorecard

| Durham; 349/7 (50 overs) | v | (H) Leicestershire Foxes; 203 (37.3 overs) |

Durham won by 146 runs
Grace Road, Leicester

17 August
Scorecard

| Durham (H); 247/8 (50 overs) | v | Derbyshire Falcons; 192 (46.5 overs) |

Durham won by 55 runs
Emirates Durham ICG, Chester-le-Street

17 August
Scorecard

| Gloucestershire; 215 (49 overs) | v | (H) Northamptonshire Steelbacks; 217/6 (41 overs) |

Northamptonshire won by 4 wickets
The County Ground, Northampton

17 August
Scorecard

| Surrey; 267 (49.5 overs) | v | (H) Somerset; 273/7 (46.4 overs) |

Somerset won by 3 wickets
The County Ground, Taunton

17 August
Scorecard

| Leicestershire Foxes; 172 (44.5 overs) | v | (H) Worcestershire; 176/2 (32 overs) |

Worcestershire won by 8 wickets
New Road, Worcester

18 August
Scorecard

| Derbyshire Falcons (H); 234/8 (50 overs) | v | Worcestershire; 181 (44 overs) |

Derbyshire won by 49 runs (D/L method)
The 3aaa County Ground, Derbyshire

18 August
Scorecard

| Surrey; 291/8 (50 overs) | v | (H) Gloucestershire; 279 (49.4 overs) |

Surrey won by 12 runs
The County Ground, Bristol

18 August
Scorecard

| Leicestershire Foxes (H); 120 (39.4 overs) | v | Somerset; 122/1 (14.5 overs) |

Somerset won by 9 wickets
Grace Road, Leicester

18 August
Scorecard

| Yorkshire Vikings (H) | v | Northamptonshire Steelbacks |

No result
Headingley, Leeds

=== Group B ===
==== Table ====
| Pos | Team | Pld | W | L | T | NR | Ded | Pts | NRR |
|---|---|---|---|---|---|---|---|---|---|
| 1 | Nottinghamshire Outlaws | 8 | 5 | 1 | 0 | 2 | 0 | 12 | 0.755 |
| 2 | Essex Eagles | 8 | 4 | 2 | 0 | 2 | 0 | 10 | 0.480 |
| 3 | Hampshire | 8 | 3 | 3 | 0 | 2 | 0 | 9 (Note: The match between Glamorgan and Hampshire was abandoned due to a dangerous pitch (the match was recorded as a 'no result', but Hampshire were awarded 2 points and Glamorgan were docked 2 points).) | 0.554 |
| 4 | Kent Spitfires | 8 | 3 | 3 | 0 | 2 | 0 | 8 | 0.031 |
| 5 | Lancashire Lightning | 8 | 3 | 3 | 0 | 2 | 0 | 8 | −0.034 |
| 6 | Warwickshire Bears | 8 | 3 | 3 | 0 | 2 | 0 | 8 | −0.765 |
| 7 | Middlesex | 8 | 3 | 4 | 0 | 1 | 0 | 7 | −0.224 |
| 8 | Glamorgan | 8 | 2 | 2 | 0 | 4 | 4 | 3 (Note: Glamorgan were docked 2 points before the start of season after preparing an unfit pitch in 2014.) | 0.160 |
| 9 | Sussex Sharks | 8 | 0 | 5 | 0 | 3 | 0 | 3 | −1.063 |

==== Fixtures ====
25 July
Scorecard

| Warwickshire Bears; 220 (49.1 overs) | v | (H) Nottinghamshire Outlaws; 221/1 (28.1 overs) |

Nottinghamshire won by 9 wickets
Welbeck Colliery Cricket Club, Market Warsop

26 July
Scorecard

| Kent Spitfires (H) | v | Essex Eagles |

Match abandoned
Nevill Ground, Royal Tunbridge Wells

26 July
Scorecard

| Middlesex (H) | v | Warwickshire Bears |

Match abandoned
Lord's, London

26 July
Scorecard

| Nottinghamshire Outlaws (H); 83/3 (23 overs) | v | Glamorgan |

No result
Welbeck Colliery Cricket Club, Market Warsop

26 July
Scorecard

| Sussex Sharks (H) | v | Lancashire Lightning |

Match abandoned
Cricket Field Road Ground, Horsham

27 July
Scorecard

| Lancashire Lightning; 161/9 (50 overs) | v | (H) Essex Eagles; 163/3 (33 overs) |

Essex won by 7 wickets
County Ground, Chelmsford

27 July
Scorecard

| Hampshire (H); 343/6 (50 overs) | v | Sussex Sharks; 256 (41 overs) |

Hampshire won by 87 runs
The Rose Bowl, Southampton

28 July
Scorecard

| Kent Spitfires; 317/7 (50 overs) | v | (H) Glamorgan; 321/7 (49.4 overs) |

Glamorgan won by 3 wickets
SWALEC Stadium, Cardiff

29 July
Scorecard

| Middlesex; 161 (46.5 overs) | v | (H) Lancashire Lightning; 162/8 (48 overs) |

Lancashire won by 2 wickets
Stanley Park, Blackpool

29 July
Scorecard

| Essex Eagles (H); 320/5 (50 overs) | v | Warwickshire Bears; 168 (40.2 overs) |

Essex won by 152 runs
County Ground, Chelmsford

30 July
Scorecard

| Hampshire; 233 (47.5 overs) | v | (H) Kent Spitfires; 236/5 (43 overs) |

Kent won by 5 wickets
St Lawrence Ground, Canterbury

30 July
Scorecard

| Sussex Sharks (H); 282/9 (50 overs) | v | Nottinghamshire Outlaws; 285/6 (46.2 overs) |

Nottinghamshire won by 4 wickets
County Ground, Hove

31 July
Scorecard

| Middlesex (H); 260/9 (50 overs) | v | Kent Spitfires; 173 (41.2 overs) |

Middlesex won by 87 runs
Brunton Memorial Ground, Radlett

31 July
Scorecard

| Glamorgan (H); 288/6 (50 overs) | v | Essex Eagles; 142 (37.1 overs) |

Glamorgan won by 146 runs
SWALEC Stadium, Cardiff

1 August
Scorecard

| Middlesex; 117 (32.4 overs) | v | (H) Hampshire; 121/0 (22.5 overs) |

Hampshire won by 10 wickets
The Rose Bowl, Southampton

2 August
Scorecard

| Essex Eagles (H); 268/6 (50 overs) | v | Nottinghamshire Outlaws; 271/3 (48.4 overs) |

Nottinghamshire won by 7 wickets
County Ground, Chelmsford

2 August
Scorecard

| Glamorgan (H); 182/9 (50 overs) | v | Hampshire; 26/0 (6.4 overs) |

No result
SWALEC Stadium, Cardiff

2 August
Scorecard

| Sussex Sharks; 154 (44.3 overs) | v | (H) Kent Spitfires; 155/2 (30.5 overs) |

Kent won by 8 wickets
St Lawrence Ground, Canterbury

2 August
Scorecard

| Lancashire Lightning (H); 265/7 (50 overs) | v | Warwickshire Bears; 268/7 (49.5 overs) |

Warwickshire won by 3 wickets
Old Trafford, Manchester

3 August
Scorecard

| Middlesex; 367/6 (50 overs) | v | (H) Sussex Sharks; 305/9 (40 overs) |

Middlesex won by 3 runs (D/L method)
County Ground, Hove

3 August
Scorecard

| Glamorgan; 179 (48.4 overs) | v | (H) Warwickshire Bears; 183/1 (38.1 overs) |

Warwickshire won by 9 wickets
Edgbaston, Birmingham

4 August
Scorecard

| Lancashire Lightning (H); 216/8 (50 overs) | v | Nottinghamshire Outlaws; 217/6 (46.4 overs) |

Nottinghamshire won by 4 wickets
Aigburth Cricket Ground, Liverpool

4 August
Scorecard

| Hampshire (H); 209 (45.5 overs) | v | Essex Eagles; 210/4 (42 overs) |

Essex won by 6 wickets
The Rose Bowl, Southampton

5 August
Scorecard

| Glamorgan (H); 9/0 (6 overs) | v | Sussex Sharks |

No result
St. Helen's Rugby and Cricket Ground, Swansea

5 August
Scorecard

| Middlesex; 296/5 (50 overs) | v | (H) Essex Eagles; 297/4 (47.1 overs) |

Essex won by 6 wickets
Castle Park Cricket Ground, Colchester

5 August
Scorecard

| Hampshire; 280/7 (50 overs) | v | (H) Warwickshire Bears; 184/9 (31 overs) |

Hampshire won by 23 runs (D/L method)
Edgbaston, Birmingham

6 August
Scorecard

| Nottinghamshire Outlaws; 295/9 (50 overs) | v | (H) Middlesex; 246 (48 overs) |

Nottinghamshire won by 49 runs
Lord's, London

8 August
Scorecard

| Lancashire Lightning; 258/9 (50 overs) | v | (H) Kent Spitfires; 207 (37.4 overs) |

Lancashire won by 51 runs
St Lawrence Ground, Canterbury

17 August
Scorecard

| Glamorgan; 251/9 (50 overs) | v | (H) Middlesex; 255/2 (39.4 overs) |

Middlesex won by 8 wickets
Lord's, London

17 August
Scorecard

| Sussex Sharks; 217 (46.5 overs) | v | (H) Warwickshire Bears; 218/6 (46.4 overs) |

Warwickshire won by 4 wickets
Rugby School, Rugby

17 August
Scorecard

| Lancashire Lightning; 301/4 (50 overs) | v | (H) Hampshire; 272 (49.1 overs) |

Lancashire won by 29 runs
The Rose Bowl, Southampton

17 August
Scorecard

| Nottinghamshire Outlaws (H); 335 (49.2 overs) | v | Kent Spitfires; 340/5 (48.4 overs) |

Kent won by 5 wickets
Trent Bridge, Nottingham

19 August
Scorecard

| Lancashire Lightning (H); 68/0 (8.4 overs) | v | Glamorgan |

No result
Old Trafford, Manchester

19 August
Scorecard

| Nottinghamshire Outlaws (H); 256/3 (39 overs) | v | Hampshire |

No result
Trent Bridge, Nottingham

19 August
Scorecard

| Sussex Sharks (H); 154/3 (32.3 overs) | v | Essex Eagles |

No result
County Ground, Hove

19 August
Scorecard

| Warwickshire Bears (H) | v | Kent Spitfires |

No result
Edgbaston, Birmingham

== Knockout stage ==
Quarter-finals
Essex Eagles (H) | 232 (47.5 ov)
Yorkshire Vikings | 252/9 (50 ov)
Gloucestershire (H) | 218/6 (33 ov)
Hampshire | 217/7 (34 ov)
Nottinghamshire Outlaws (H) | 170/4 (24 ov)
Durham | 144 (21.2 ov)
Surrey (H) | 273 (49.5 ov)
Kent Spitfires | 233 (37.4 ov)

Semi-finals
Yorkshire Vikings (H) | 263/9 (50 ov)
Gloucestershire | 267/2 (46.5 ov)
Surrey (H) | 300/5 (50 ov)
Nottinghamshire Outlaws | 296/7 (50 ov)

Final
Gloucestershire | 220 (47.4 ov)
Surrey | 214 (49.3 ov)

=== Quarter-finals ===
25 August
Scorecard

| Nottinghamshire Outlaws (H); 170/4 (24 overs) | v | Durham; 144 (21.2 overs) |

Nottinghamshire won by 49 runs (D/L method)
Trent Bridge, Nottingham

- Due to rain, match was reduced 24 overs and Durham's target was set to 194 per D/L method.

26 August
Scorecard

| Hampshire; 217/7 (34 overs) | v | (H) Gloucestershire; 218/6 (33 overs) |

Gloucestershire won by 4 wickets
The County Ground, Bristol

- Due to rain, match was reduced to 34 overs per side

27 August
Scorecard

| Yorkshire Vikings; 252/9 (50 overs) | v | (H) Essex Eagles; 232 (47.5 overs) |

Yorkshire won by 20 runs
County Ground, Chelmsford

27 August
Scorecard

| Surrey (H); 273 (49.5 overs) | v | Kent Spitfires; 233 (37.4 overs) |

Surrey won by 17 runs (D/L method)
The Kia Oval, London

- Kent revised their target as 251 off 40 overs.

=== Semi-finals ===
6 September
Scorecard

| Yorkshire Vikings (H); 263/9 (50 overs) | v | Gloucestershire; 267/2 (46.5 overs) |

Gloucestershire won by 8 wickets
Headingley, Leeds

7 September
Scorecard

| Surrey (H); 300/5 (50 overs) | v | Nottinghamshire Outlaws; 296/7 (50 overs) |

Surrey won by 4 runs
The Kia Oval, London

=== Final ===
19 September
Scorecard

| Gloucestershire; 220 (47.4 overs) | v | Surrey; 214 (49.3 overs) |

Gloucestershire won by 6 runs
Lord's, London

== See also ==
- ECB 40
