= County Cricket Ground, Chelmsford =

Cricket ground in Essex, England

Coordinates: 51°43′54″N 0°28′9″E

County Ground
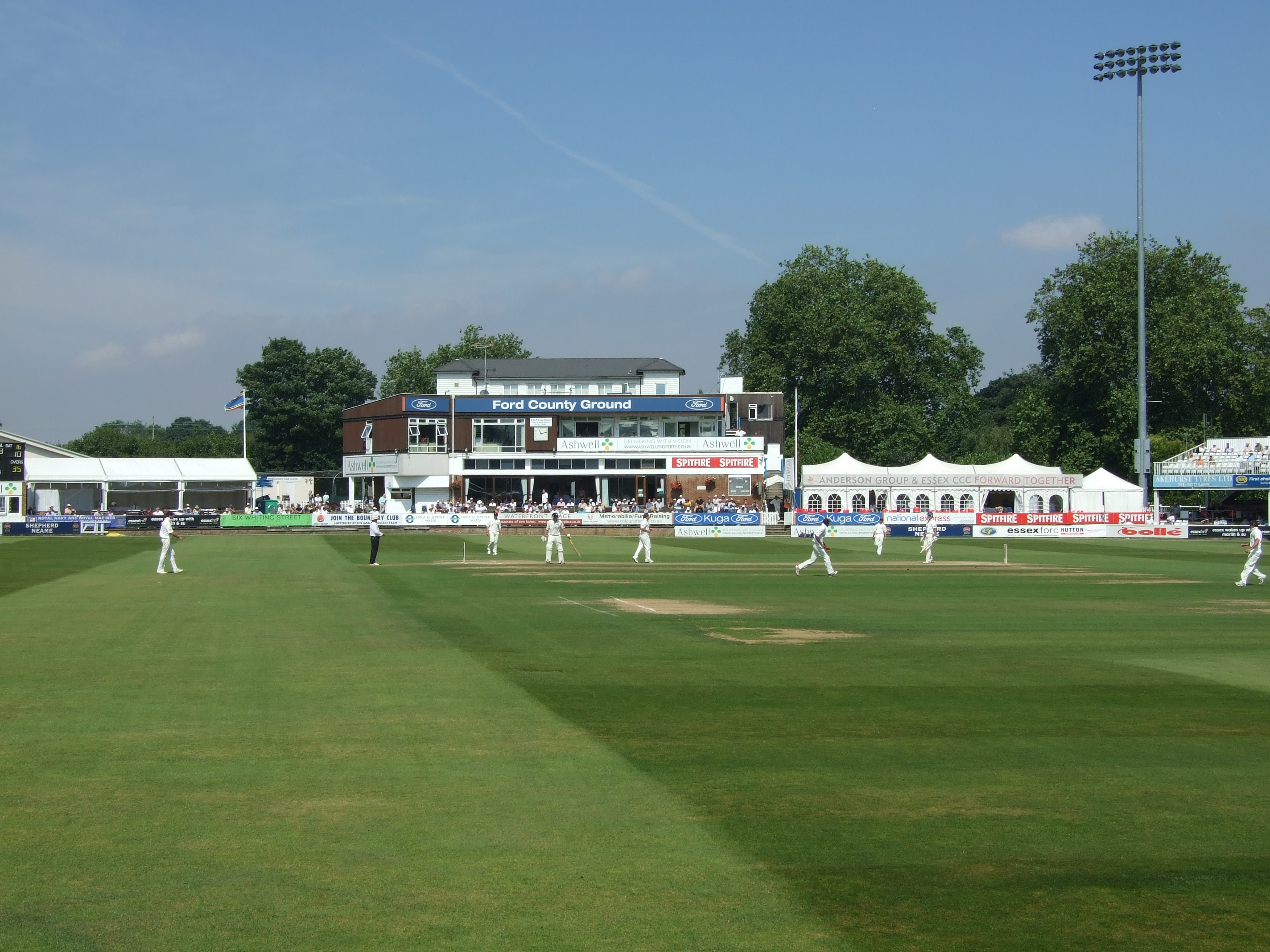
- The Pavilion at Chelmsford
- Interactive map of County Ground

Ground information
- Location: Chelmsford, Essex
- Country: England
- Capacity: 6,500
- End names
- Sir Alastair Cook End Graham Gooch End

International information
- First men's ODI: 20 June 1983: Australia v India
- Last men's ODI: 14 May 2023: Ireland v Bangladesh
- First women's ODI: 20 June 2000: England v South Africa
- Last women's ODI: 29 May 2024: England v Pakistan
- First women's T20I: 29 June 2010: England v New Zealand
- Last women's T20I: 28 May 2026: England v India

Team information
Essex	(1925 – present)
- As of 29 May 2024; Source: Cricinfo

The County Ground in Chelmsford, Essex, has been the official home ground of Essex County Cricket Club since 1967. It has been used for first-class cricket since 1925 and List A matches since 1969. The capacity is 6,500, mostly in single-tier seating with a single double-tiered stand. The pavilion was completed in the 1970s.

== History ==
Essex's first match at the ground took place in June 1925 against Oxford University. and their first County Championship game at Chelmsford was against Somerset in 1926. When the club left its headquarters at Leyton Cricket Ground at the end of the 1933 season they began a period of playing games at various venues around the county, with a week allocated to each. Chelmsford was given two weeks a season but poor attendances led to Essex ceasing to play at the ground after 1956. In 1966 the club purchased the Chelmsford ground for £15,000, with some financial assistance from Warwickshire's Supporters Association, and the ground became Essex's headquarters with home matches returning there from the 1967 season. The pavilion was opened during the 1970 season and the permanent scoreboard at the ground was constructed in 1981.

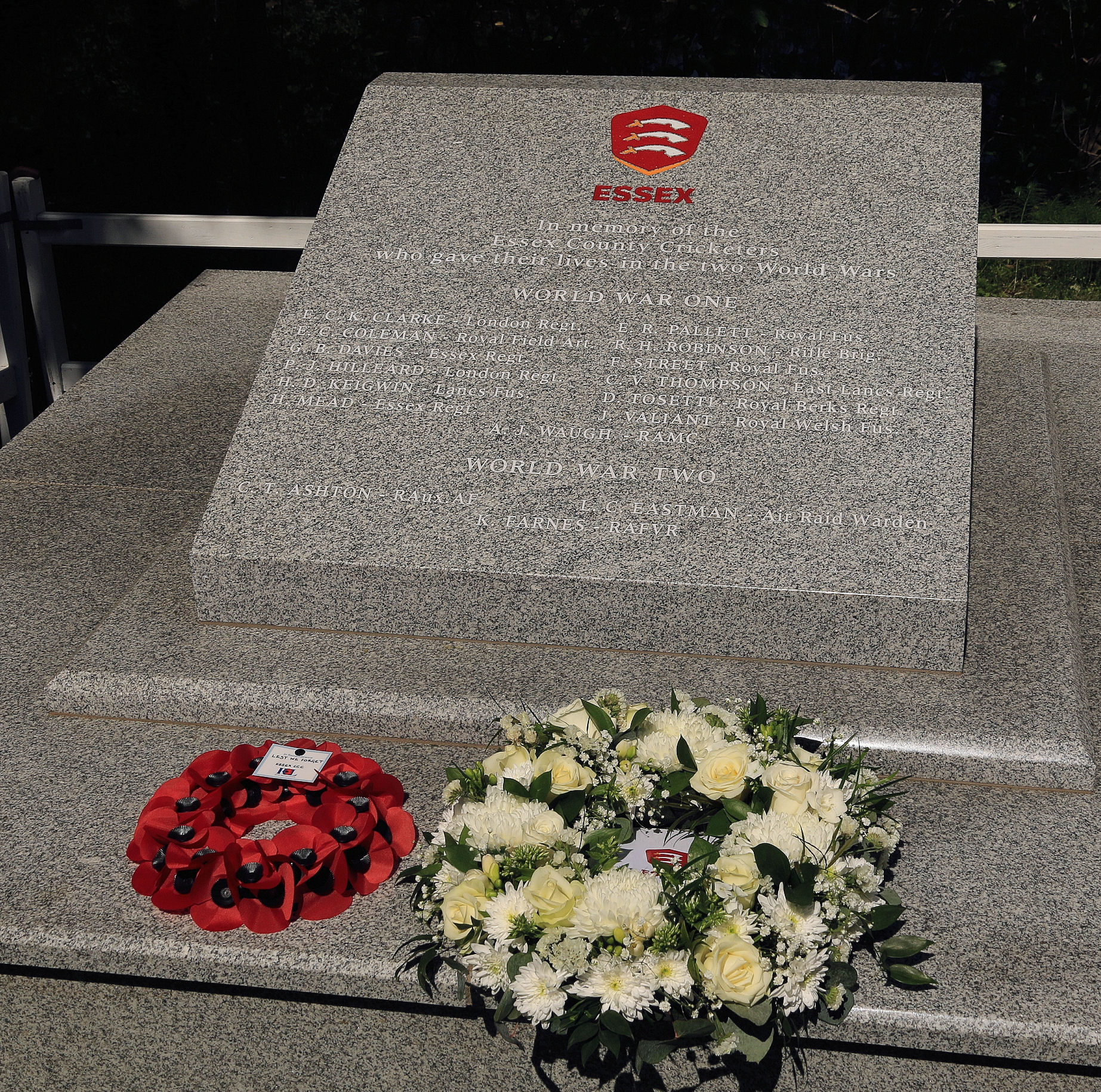
A memorial unveiled in 2025 to Essex players who served and died in both World Wars.

In April 2024, Essex Cricket renamed the two bowling ends of the ground after former players Sir Alastair Cook and Graham Gooch. The River End was renamed to the Sir Alastair Cook End, and the Hayes Close End to the Graham Gooch End.

== Domestic cricket ==
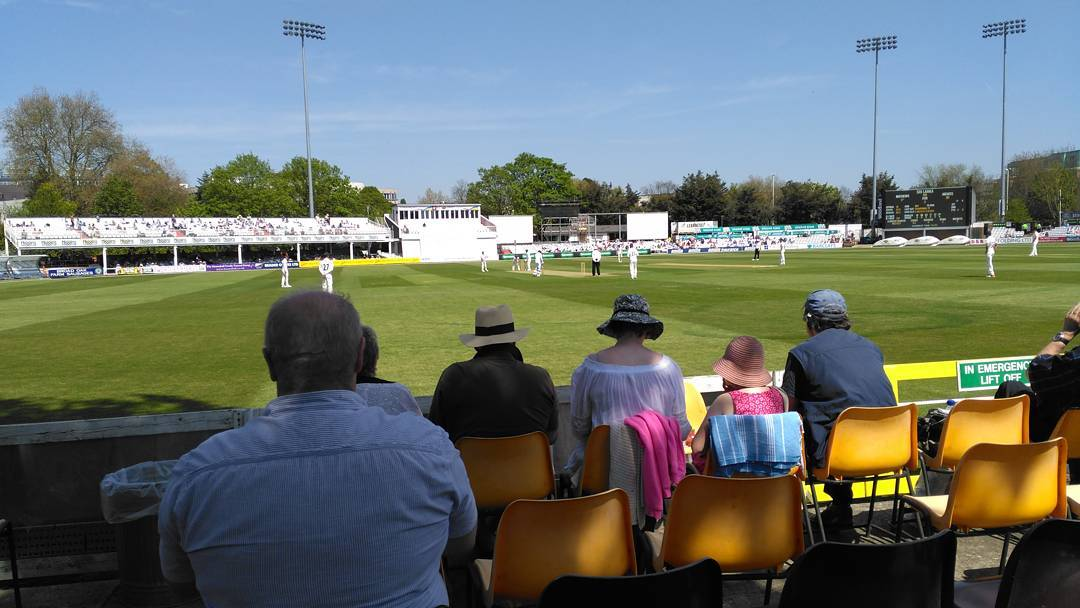
The River End of the ground, showing the main scoreboard

Chelmsford is a small ground, and is notoriously difficult to defend a total at in limited overs cricket, demonstrated by the fact that no team has ever defended a score of under 170 in T20 cricket here. Former Essex and England batsman Graham Gooch scored most of his first-class runs there. Graham Napier scored 152 off 58 balls (16 sixes and 10 fours) in a Twenty20 match v Sussex at the ground. The success of Essex County Cricket Club in the shorter versions of the game between 2005 and 2008 led to the attraction of many new fans. Eventually the ground was regularly selling out in Twenty20 and Friends Provident Trophy games.

The Ford Motor Company had naming rights for the ground for between 2005 and 2013. From 2017 to 2019 the naming rights to the stadium were bought by Cloudfm and the ground was known as the Cloudfm County Ground. The large amount of passionate support Essex receive at this ground has led to it being popularly referred to as 'Fortress Chelmsford'.

== International cricket ==
As of May 2023, the venue has hosted six men's One Day International (ODI) matches. The first ODI was played between Australia and India during the 1983 Cricket World Cup and the most recent ODI match was played between Ireland and Bangladesh during the Bangladeshi cricket team against Ireland in England in 2023 series in May 2023, as part of the 2020–2023 ICC Cricket World Cup Super League.

=== ODI records ===
- Highest total: 320/7 (by Bangladesh), against Ireland, 12 May 2023
- Lowest total: 116 (by Bangladesh), against New Zealand, 17 May 1999
- Highest score: 140 by Harry Tector (Ireland), against Bangladesh, 12 May 2023
- Best bowling: 4/20 by Madan Lal (India), against Australia, 20 Jun 1983
- Most runs: Harry Tector (Ireland) - 206 (3 innings)
- Most wickets: Mark Adair (Ireland) - 7 (3 innings)

=== List of One Day International centuries ===
Two ODI centuries have been scored at Chelmsford.

No.	Score	Player	Team	Opposing team	Date	Result	Ref
1	140	Harry Tector	Ireland	Bangladesh	12 May 2023	Lost	
2	117	Najmul Hossain Shanto	Bangladesh	Ireland	12 May 2023	Won	

== Ground redevelopment since 2010 ==
New development to the ground include the building of new apartment blocks, the construction of a new cricket school, public square and an access bridge from the Chelmsford town centre side of the ground. In 2019 the ground's floodlights were replaced by larger, square floodlights.

== Sources ==
- Lemmon, David; Marshall, Mike (1987). Essex County Cricket Club The Official History. London: The Kingswood Press. ISBN 0434981117.
- Powell, William (1989). The Wisden Guide to Cricket Grounds. London: Stanley Paul & Co Ltd. ISBN 009173830X.

== See also ==
- List of cricket grounds in England and Wales
