= 2009 Twenty20 Cup =

- Dates: 25 May 2009 – 5 August 2009
- Administrator: England and Wales Cricket Board
- Cricket format: Twenty20
- Tournament format(s): Group stage and knockout
- Champions: Sussex Sharks (1st title)
- Participants: 18
- Matches: 97
- Attendance: 491,871 (5,071 per match)
- Most runs: Jonathan Trott (525 for Warwickshire)
- Most wickets: Alfonso Thomas (18 for Somerset)

The 2009 Twenty20 Cup was the seventh edition of what would later become the T20 Blast competition for English and Welsh county clubs. The finals day took place on 15 August at Edgbaston, and was won by the Sussex Sharks.

== Group stage ==
=== Midlands/Wales/West Division ===
	Glamorgan Dragons	Gloucestershire Gladiators	Northamptonshire Steelbacks	Somerset Sabres	Warwickshire Bears	Worcestershire Royals
Glamorgan Dragons		Glamorgan; 39 runs	Northamptonshire; 20 runs	Somerset; 1 run	Warwickshire; 6 wickets	Worcestershire; 29 runs
Gloucestershire Gladiators	Glamorgan; 6 wickets		Northamptonshire; 10 runs	Somerset; 3 wickets	Warwickshire; 7 wickets	Worcestershire; 13 runs
Northamptonshire Steelbacks	Northamptonshire; 40 runs	Gloucestershire; 2 wickets		Somerset; 30 runs	Northamptonshire; 17 runs	Northamptonshire; 7 wickets
Somerset Sabres	Somerset; 10 wickets	Gloucestershire; 21 runs	No result		Somerset; 5 wickets	Somerset; 7 wickets
Warwickshire Bears	Warwickshire; 4 wickets	Warwickshire; 4 wickets	Northamptonshire; 24 runs	Warwickshire; 1 run		Warwickshire; 7 wickets
Worcestershire Royals	Worcestershire; 101 runs	Worcestershire; 23 runs	Northamptonshire; 6 wickets	Worcestershire; 8 runs	Warwickshire; 7 wickets	

Pos	Team	Pld	W	L	T	NR	Pts	NRR
1	Northamptonshire Steelbacks	10	7	2	0	1	15	0.583
2	Warwickshire Bears	10	7	3	0	0	14	0.236
3	Somerset Sabres	10	6	3	0	1	13	0.417
4	Worcestershire Royals	10	5	5	0	0	10	0.581
5	Gloucestershire Gladiators	10	2	8	0	0	4	−0.663
6	Glamorgan Dragons	10	2	8	0	0	4	−1.031

==== Results ====
25 May
Scorecard

Northamptonshire Steelbacks; 176/6 (20 overs)	v	Warwickshire Bears; 159/8 (20 overs)
N Boje 45 (30); JS Patel 2/29 [4]		JO Troughton 53 (39); IJ Harvey 4/18 [4]

Northamptonshire won by 17 runs
County Ground, Northampton
Umpires: RJ Bailey and B Dudleston
Player of the match: IJ Harvey (N'hants)

25 May
Scorecard

Worcestershire Royals; 145/7 (20 overs)	v	Gloucestershire Gladiators; 122 (17.4 overs)
AA Noffke 34 (20); SP Kirby 3/41 [4]		WTS Porterfield 25 (26); ID Fisher 3/16 [3]

Worcestershire won by 23 runs
New Road, Worcester
Umpires: JW Holder and G Sharp
Player of the match: ID Fisher (Worcs)

25 May
(day/night)
Scorecard

Somerset Sabres; 113/6 (20 overs)	v	Glamorgan Dragons; 112/9 (20 overs)
Z de Bruyn 70 (63); JWM Dalryple 2/24 [4]		BJ Wright 29 (36); MTC Waller 3/17 [4]

Somerset won by 1 run
SWALEC Stadium, Cardiff
Umpires: NGC Cowley and RK Illingworth
Player of the match: Z de Bruyn (Somst)

27 May
Scorecard

Warwickshire Bears; 187/5 (20 overs)	v	Somerset Sabres; 190/5 (19.4 overs)
JO Troughton 50 (29); MTC Waller 2/38 [4]		Z de Bruyn 72 (44); KHD Barker 2/33 [4]

Somerset won by 5 wickets
County Ground, Taunton
Umpires: TE Jesty and JW Lloyds
Player of the match: Z de Bruyn (Somst)

27 May
(day/night)
Scorecard

Glamorgan Dragons; 166/6 (20 overs)	v	Gloucestershire Gladiators; 127 (19 overs)
MJ Cosgrove 52 (39); GM Hussain 2/41 [4]		J Lewis 30* (25); RE Watkins 5/16 [4]

Glamorgan won by 39 runs
SWALEC Stadium, Cardiff
Umpires: RJ Bailey and VA Holder
Player of the match: MJ Cosgrove and RE Watkins (Glam)

29 May
Scorecard

Northamptonshire Steelbacks; 195/3 (20 overs)	v	Glamorgan; 155/9 (20 overs)
IJ Harvey 64 (37); DA Cosker 2/32 [4]		MJ Cosgrove 40 (22); JJ van der Wath 3/23 [4]

Northamptonshire won by 40 runs
County Ground, Northampton
Umpires: RJ Bailey and SA Garratt
Player of the match: IJ Harvey (N'hants)

29 May
Scorecard

Gloucestershire Gladiators; 162/8 (20 overs)	v	Somerset Sabres; 141/5 (20 overs)
CM Spearman 51 (29); AC Thomas 3/31 [4]		PD Trego 44* (32); SP Kirby 2/17 [4]

Gloucestershire won by 21 runs
County Ground, Taunton
Umpires: NGC Cowley and TE Jesty
Player of the match: CM Spearman (Gloucs)

29 May
Scorecard

Worcestershire Royals; 148/8 (20 overs)	v	Warwickshire Bears; 149/3 (18.2 overs)
SM Davies 73 (48); KHD Barker 4/19 [4]		JO Troughton 58 (44); AA Noffke 2/27 [4]

Warwickshire won by 7 wickets
Edgbaston, Birmingham
Umpires: NGB Cook and VA Holder
Player of the match: KHD Barker (Warks)

30 May
Scorecard

Worcestershire Royals; 140/5 (20 overs)	v	Northamptonshire Steelbacks; 142/4 (19 overs)
SC Moore 62* (52); DJ Willey 3/9 [3]		NJ O'Brien 48 (38); DKH Mitchell 2/26 [4]

Northamptonshire won by 6 wickets
New Road, Worcester
Umpires: B Dudleston and RT Robinson
Player of the match: JJ van der Wath (N'hants)

30 May
Scorecard

Glamorgan Dragons; 129/8 (20 overs)	v	Warwickshire Bears; 133/4 (19.1 overs)
JWM Dalrymple 50 (53); NM Carter 3/16 [4]		IJL Trott 55 (50); GJP Kruger 2/18 [3]

Warwickshire won by 6 wickets
SWALEC Stadium, Cardiff
Umpires: JW Lloyds and JF Steele
Player of the match: NM Carter (Warks)

1 June
Scorecard

Worcestershire Royals; 188/5 (20 overs)	v	Gloucestershire Gladiators; 175/8 (20 overs)
VS Solanki 51 (35); SP Kirby 2/28 [4]		APR Gidman 64 (50); AA Noffke 2/25 [4]

Worcestershire won by 13 runs
County Ground, Bristol
Umpires: TE Jesty and P Willey
Player of the match: VS Solanki (Worcs)

1 June
Scorecard

Glamorgan Dragons; 128/7 (20 overs)	v	Somerset Sabres; 132/0 (14.4 overs)
JWM Dalrymple 56 (50); Z de Bruyn 2/2 [1]		ME Trescothick 69* (47)

Somerset won by 10 wickets
County Ground, Taunton
Umpires: VA Holder and JW Lloyds
Player of the match: ME Trescothick (Somst)

1 June
Scorecard

Northamptonshire Steelbacks; 155/7 (20 overs)	v	Warwickshire Bears; 131/6 (20 overs)
RA White 59 (47); NM Carter 2/16 [3]		IJL Trott 44 (34); DJ Willey 2/17 [4]

Northamptonshire won by 24 runs
Edgbaston, Birmingham
Umpires: RK Illingworth and DJ Millns
Player of the match: DJ Willey (N'hants)

3 June
Scorecard

Northamptonshire Steelbacks; 162 (19.5 overs)	v	Gloucestershire Gladiators; 152/7 (20 overs)
IJ Harvey 48 (38); J Lewis 4/37 [3.5]		HJH Marshall 42 (22); DJ Willey 2/15 [3]

Northamptonshire won by 10 runs
County Ground, Bristol
Umpires: MJD Bodenham and JW Lloyds
Player of the match: IJ Harvey (N'hants)

3 June
Scorecard

Worcestershire Royals; 165/6 (20 overs)	v	Somerset Sabres; 157 (20 overs)
BF Smith 35* (22); AV Suppiah 3/25 [3]		PD Trego 58* (31); GJ Batty 3/21 [4]

Worcestershire won by 8 runs
New Road, Worcester
Umpires: SA Garratt and G Sharp
Player of the match: GJ Batty (Worcs)

4 June
Scorecard

Worcestershire Royals; 164/6 (20 overs)	v	Glamorgan Dragons; 135 (20 overs)
SC Moore 42 (38); JWM Dalrymple 2/19 [2]		BJ Wright 30 (24); GM Andrew 3/19 [3]

Worcestershire won by 29 runs
SWALEC Stadium, Cardiff
Umpires: MJD Bodenham and SA Garratt
Player of the match: GJ Batty (Worcs)

4 June
Scorecard

Somerset Sabres; 163/3 (20 overs)	v	Northamptonshire Steelbacks; 133/9 (20 overs)
Z de Bruyn 83 (52); IJ Harvey 1/17 [2]		IJ Harvey 30 (17); CM Willoughby 4/29 [4]

Somerset won by 30 runs
County Ground, Northampton
Umpires: MA Gough and RT Robinson
Player of the match: Z de Bruyn (Somst)

4 June
Scorecard

Gloucestershire Gladiators; 135/7 (20 overs)	v	Warwickshire Bears; 139/6 (19 overs)
GP Hodnett 39 (36); KHD Barker 2/16 [4]		IJ Westwood 44 (37); GM Hussain 2/20 [3]

Warwickshire won by 4 wickets
Edgbaston, Birmingham
Umpires: DJ Millns and P Willey
Player of the match: IJ Westwood (Warks)

22 June
Scorecard

Gloucestershire Gladiators; 141 (19.4 overs)	v	Warwickshire Bears; 144/3 (16.1 overs)
DO Brown 33 (31); JS Patel 3/15 [3.4]		IJL Trott 73 (52); V Banerjee 2/30 [4]

Warwickshire won by 7 wickets
County Ground, Bristol
Umpires: NGC Cowley and VA Holder
Player of the match: IJL Trott (Warks)

23 June
Scorecard

Northamptonshire Steelbacks; 133 (20 overs)	v	Gloucestershire Gladiators; 134/8 (19.5 overs)
IJ Harvey 43 (36); GM Hussain 3/22 [4]		GP Hodnett 60 (46); N Boje 3/23 [4]

Gloucestershire won by 2 wickets
County Ground, Northampton
Umpires: RJ Bailey and RK Illingworth
Player of the match: GP Hodnett (Gloucs)

23 June
Scorecard

Worcestershire Royals; 176/8 (20 overs)	v	Somerset Sabres; 177/3 (19 overs)
BF Smith 44 (24); CM Willoughby 2/24 [4]		JC Hildreth 48* (37); DKH Mitchell 1/11 [2]

Somerset won by 7 wickets
County Ground, Taunton
Umpires: VA Holder and JF Steele
Player of the match: JC Hildreth (Somst)

23 June
Scorecard

Glamorgan Dragons; 148/7 (20 overs)	v	Warwickshire Bears; 149/6 (18.5 overs)
JWM Dalrymple 63 (42); R Clarke 2/31 [4] JS Patel 2/31 [4]		IJL Trott 33 (17); AG Wharf 2/23 [3.5]

Warwickshire won by 4 wickets
Edgbaston, Birmingham
Umpires: SA Garratt and RA Kettleborough
Player of the match: R Clarke (Warks)

24 June
Scorecard

Worcestershire Royals; 222/4 (20 overs)	v	Glamorgan Dragons; 121/6 (20 overs)
VS Solanki 100 (48); JWM Dalrymple 2/34 [3]		RDB Croft 52* (34); GJ Batty 2/28 [4]

Worcestershire won by 101 runs
New Road, Worcester
Umpires: NGB Cook and NGC Cowley
Player of the match: VS Solanki (Worcs)

25 June
Scorecard

Northamptonshire Steelbacks; 49/0 (5 overs)	v	Somerset Sabres
IJ Harvey 27* (15)

No result
County Ground, Taunton
Umpires: RK Illingworth and JW Lloyds

- Rain stopped play in the fifth over.

26 June
Scorecard

Worcestershire Royals; 162/6 (20 overs)	v	Warwickshire Bears; 166/3 (19.1 overs)
MM Ali 46 (39); KHD Barker 2/19 [2]		IJL Trott 86* (62); MM Ali 2/15 [2]

Warwickshire won by 7 wickets
New Road, Worcester
Umpires: JW Holder and RT Robinson
Player of the match: IJL Trott (Warks)

26 June
Scorecard

Gloucestershire Gladiators; 173 (19.3 overs)	v	Somerset Sabres; 175/7 (19 overs)
HJH Marshall 36 (23); AC Thomas 3/31 [3.3]		C Kieswetter 84 (42); SP Kirby 2/17 [3]

Somerset won by 3 wickets
County Ground, Bristol
Umpires: IJ Gould and RK Illingworth
Player of the match: C Kieswetter (Somst)

26 June
Scorecard

Northamptonshire Steelbacks; 157/7 (20 overs)	v	Glamorgan Dragons; 137/9 (20 overs)
MH Wessels 66* (44); JAR Harris 4/23 [4]		JWM Dalrymple 33 (28); N Boje 3/14 [4]

Northamptonshire won by 20 runs
SWALEC Stadium, Cardiff
Umpires: NGC Cowley and JF Steele
Player of the match: MH Wessels (N'hants)

28 June
Scorecard

Gloucestershire Gladiators; 148/7 (20 overs)	v	Glamorgan Dragons; 151/4 (18.3 overs)
DO Brown 56 (35); RE Watkins 3/23 [4]		BJ Wright 55* (39); AJ Ireland 1/12 [2]

Glamorgan won by 6 wickets
County Ground, Bristol
Umpires: RK Illingworth and TE Jesty
Player of the match: BJ Wright (Glam)

28 June
Scorecard

Worcestershire Royals; 109/9 (20 overs)	v	Northamptonshire Steelbacks; 110/3 (18 overs)
MM Ali 28 (41); AJ Hall 4/19 [4]		SD Peters 61* (52); ID Fisher 2/18 [4]

Northamptonshire won by 7 wickets
County Ground, Northampton
Umpires: MR Benson and RA Kettleborough
Player of the match: AJ Hall (N'hants)

28 June
Scorecard

Warwickshire Bears; 193/6 (20 overs)	v	Somerset Sabres; 192/7 (20 overs)
JO Troughton 62 (41); AC Thomas 2/33 [4]		Z de Bruyn 40 (33); JS Patel 3/23 [4]

Warwickshire won by 1 run
Edgbaston, Birmingham
Umpires: JW Holder and NA Mallender
Player of the match: JS Patel (Warks)

=== North Division ===
	Derbyshire Phantoms	Durham Dynamos	Lancashire Lightning	Leicestershire Foxes	Nottinghamshire Outlaws	Yorkshire Carnegie
Derbyshire Phantoms		Durham; 6 wickets	Lancashire; 50 runs	Leicestershire; 14 runs	Nottinghamshire; 8 wickets	Yorkshire; 8 wickets
Durham Dynamos	Derbyshire; 59 runs		No result	Leicestershire; 7 wickets	Durham; 8 runs	Durham; 41 runs
Lancashire Lightning	Lancashire; 38 runs	Lancashire; 6 wickets		Leicestershire; 8 runs	Lancashire; 11 runs	Lancashire; 6 Wickets
Leicestershire Foxes	Derbyshire; 8 wickets	Durham; 6 wickets	Lancashire; 7 wickets		Leicestershire; 70 runs	Leicestershire; 11 runs
Nottinghamshire Outlaws	Nottinghamshire; 8 wickets	Durham; 1 wicket	Lancashire; 9 wickets	Nottinghamshire; 9 wickets		Nottinghamshire; 11 runs
Yorkshire Carnegie	Derbyshire; 37 runs	Yorkshire; 3 wickets	Lancashire; 5 wickets	Yorkshire; 3 wickets	Yorkshire; 14 runs	

Pos	Team	Pld	W	L	T	NR	Pts	NRR
1	Lancashire Lightning	10	8	1	0	1	17	1.112
2	Durham Dynamos	10	5	4	0	1	11	0.157
3	Leicestershire Foxes	10	5	5	0	0	10	−0.041
4	Nottinghamshire Outlaws	10	4	6	0	0	8	−0.008
5	Yorkshire Carnegie	10	4	6	0	0	8	−0.475
6	Derbyshire Phantoms	10	3	7	0	0	6	−0.611

==== Results ====
25 May
Scorecard

Durham Dynamos; 163/6 (20 overs)	v	Nottinghamshire Outlaws; 167/9 (20 overs)
WI Jefferson 75 (48); N Killeen 3/21 [4]		ID Blackwell 59 (33); DJ Pattinson 3/34 [4]

Durham won by 1 wicket
Trent Bridge, Nottingham
Umpires: VA Holder and DJ Millns
Player of the match: ID Blackwell (Durham)

25 May
Scorecard

Leicestershire Foxes; 148/3 (20 overs)	v	Yorkshire Carnegie; 149/7 (19.5 overs)
HD Ackerman 66 (56); Rana Naved-ul-Hasan 2/22 [4]		MP Vaughan 35 (30); JKH Naik 2/22 [3]

Yorkshire won by 3 wickets
Headingley, Leeds
Umpires: MA Gough and NA Mallender
Player of the match: A Shahzad (Yorkshire)

26 May
(day/night)
Scorecard

Derbyshire Phantoms; 175/6 (20 overs)	v	Durham Dynamos; 116/10 (15.3 overs)
GT Park 50 (33); CEW Silverwood 2/23 [4]		KJ Coetzer 31 (27); T Lungley 3/16 [2.3]

Derbyshire won by 59 runs
Riverside Ground, Chester-le-Street
Umpires: JH Evans and RA Kettleborough
Player of the match: GT Park (Derbyshire)

26 May
(day/night)
Scorecard

Yorkshire Carnegie; 105/8 (20 overs)	v	Lancashire Lightning; 107/4 (15.3 overs)
MP Vaughan 36 (31); SD Parry 3/20 [4]		AG Prince 44 (36); GJ Kruis 2/18 [3.3]

Lancashire won by 6 wickets
Old Trafford Cricket Ground, Manchester
Umpires: SA Garratt and RT Robinson
Player of the match: AG Prince (Lancashire)

28 May
(day/night)
Scorecard

Lancashire Lightning; 151/6 (20 overs)	v	Nottinghamshire Outlaws; 140/7 (20 overs)
F du Plessis 31 (21); RJ Sidebottom 2/26 [4]		CMW Read 58* (47); TC Smith 3/20 [3]

Lancashire won by 11 runs
Old Trafford Cricket Ground, Manchester
Umpires: B Dudleston and DJ Millns
Player of the match: CMW Read (Nottinghamshire)

28 May
(day/night)
Scorecard

Leicestershire Foxes; 127/9 (20 overs)	v	Derbyshire Phantoms; 129/2 (19 overs)
JWA Taylor 40 (39); T Lungley 5/27 [4]		CJL Rogers 58 (36); HF Gurney 1/18 [4]

Derbyshire won by 8 Wickets
Grace Road, Leicester
Umpires: SA Garratt and RT Robinson
Player of the match: T Lungley (Derbyshire)

29 May
(day/night)
Scorecard

Derbyshire Phantoms; 158/5 (10 overs)	v	Nottinghamshire Outlaws; 159/2 (15.1 overs)
WW Hinds 66 (45); LJ Fletcher 2/27 [4]		GP Swann 90* (47); GG Wagg 2/41 [4]

Nottinghamshire won by 8 wickets
County Ground, Derby
Umpires: JW Holder and NA Mallender
Player of the match: GP Swann (Nottinghamshire)

29 May
(day/night)
Scorecard

Durham Dynamos; 144/8 (20 overs)	v	Leicestershire Foxes; 148/3 (20 overs)
KJ Coetzer 39* (35); ACF Wyatt 3/14 [4]		PA Nixon 53*(39); PD Collingwood 2/33 [4]

Leicestershire won by 7 wickets
Riverside Ground, Chester-le-Street
Umpires: JH Evans and PJ Hartley
Player of the match: PA Nixon (Leicestershire)

29 May
(day/night)
Scorecard

Yorkshire Carnegie; 111/8 (20 overs)	v	Lancashire Lightning; 112/5 (19.1 overs)
JA Rudolph 38 (33); G Chapple 2/14 [4]		SJ Croft 40*(49); DJ Wainwright 2/21 [4]

Lancashire won by 5 wickets
Headingley, Leeds
Umpires: MA Gough and RA Kettleborough
Player of the match: SI Mahmood (Lancashire)

31 May
Scorecard

Derbyshire Phantoms; 131/6 (20 overs)	v	Yorkshire Carnegie; 134/2 (16.1 overs)
WW Hinds 43 (43); GJ Kruis 2/16 [4]		AW Gale 79* (59); TD Groenewald 1/13 [2]

Yorkshire won by 8 wickets
Queen's Park, Chesterfield, Chesterfield
Umpires: RJ Bailey and SA Garratt
Player of the match: AW Gale (Yorkshire)

31 May
Scorecard

Durham Dynamos; 177/4 (20 overs)	v	Nottinghamshire Outlaws; 169/10 (19.4 overs)
MJ Di Venuto 55 (40); SR Patel 2/32 [4]		WI Jefferson 42 (24); ME Claydon 5/26 [3.4]

Durham won by 8 runs
Riverside Ground, Chester-le-Street
Umpires: PJ Hartley and NA Mallender
Player of the match: ME Claydon (Durham)

31 May
Scorecard

Leicestershire Foxes; 147/3 (20 overs)	v	Lancashire Lightning; 151/3 (16.3 overs)
J Allenby 71* (54); SJ Croft 1/11 [2]		F du Plessis 78* (49); HF Gurney 2/21 [4]

Lancashire won by 7 wickets
Grace Road, Leicester
Umpires: MA Gough and RA Kettleborough
Player of the match: F du Plessis (Lancashire)

2 June
Scorecard

Lancashire Lightning; 165/7 (20 overs)	v	Derbyshire Phantoms; 127/9 (20 overs)
Paul Horton 41 (20); Garry Park 3-23 (4)		Wavell Hinds 32 (31); Sajid Mahmood 4-29 (4)

Lancashire won by 38 runs
Old Trafford Cricket Ground, Manchester
Umpires: Barry Dudleston, Jeff Evans
Player of the match: Sajid Mahmood

2 June
Scorecard

Durham Dynamos; 116/8 (20 overs)	v	Yorkshire Carnegie; 117/8 (20 overs)
Dale Benkenstein 36 (35); Naved-ul-Hasan 2-15 (4)		Anthony McGrath 34 (43); Mitchell Claydon 2-18 (4)

Yorkshire won by 2 wickets
Headingley, Leeds
Umpires: John Holder, Richard Kettleborough
Player of the match: Tim Bresnan

3 June
Scorecard

Leicestershire Foxes; 205/2	v	Nottinghamshire Outlaws; 135/10
Jim Allenby 110 (58); Samit Patel 1-31 (4)		Bilal Shafayat 29 (32); Harry Gurney 3-21 (4)

Leics won by 70 runs
Grace Road, Leicester
Umpires: Michael Gough, Neil Bainton
Player of the match: Jim Allenby

3 June
Scorecard

Durham Dynamos; 123/6	v	Lancashire Lightning; 124/4
Gordon Muchall 50 (50); Faf du Plessis 1=16 (3)		Tom Smith 57 (56); Gareth Breese 1-20 (4)

Lancashire won by 6 wickets
Old Trafford, Manchester
Umpires: JW Holder and NGB Cook
Player of the match: Tom Smith

4 June
Scorecard

Nottinghamshire Outlaws; 155/6	v	Yorkshire Carnegie; 156/2
Adam Voges 82 (55); Naved-ul-Hasan 4-23 (4)		Andrew Gale 91 (55); Andre Adams 2-34 (4)

Yorkshire won by 8 wickets
Headingley, Leeds
Umpires: JH Evans and RA Kettleborough
Player of the match: Andrew Gale

4 June
Scorecard

Leicestershire Foxes; 144/6	v	Derbyshire Phantoms; 130/5
Matthew Boyce 33 (41); Garry Park 3-29 (4)		Greg Smith 43 (36); Claude Henderson 2-21 (4)

Leics won by 14 runs
County Ground, Derby
Umpires: Barry Dudleston and Peter Hartley
Player of the match: Jim Allenby

22 June
Scorecard

Leicestershire Foxes; 146/5	v	Lancashire Lightning; 138/10
Jim Allenby 69 (45); Stephen Parry 2-21 (4)		Steven Croft 30 (25); Iain O'Brien 5-23 (4)

Leics won by 8 runs
Aigburth Cricket Ground, Liverpool
Umpires: PJ Hartley and JW Holder
Player of the match: Iain O'Brien

22 June
Scorecard

Nottinghamshire Outlaws; 165/4	v	Yorkshire Carnegie; 154/8
Ali Brown 66 (32); Deon Kruis 2-38 (4)		Andrew Gale 76 (51); Mark Ealham 2-24 (3)

Notts won by 11 runs
Trent Bridge, Nottingham
Umpires: DJ Millns and NA Mallender
Player of the match: Ali Brown

23 June
Scorecard

Derbyshire Phantoms; 153/6	v	Durham Dynamos; 154/4
Stuart Law 59 (44); Mitchell Claydon 2-40 (4)		Phil Mustard 52 (31); Nantie Hayward 1-22 (4)

Durham won by 6 wickets
County Ground, Derby
Umpires: B Dudleston and P Willey
Player of the match: David Warner

24 June
Scorecard

Leicestershire Foxes; 123/7	v	Nottinghamshire Outlaws; 124/1
Matthew Boyce 32 (23); Ryan Sidebottom 3-16 (4)		Ali Brown 72 (48); Claude Henderson 1-32 (4)

Notts won by 9 wickets
Trent Bridge, Nottingham
Umpires: JH Evans and RT Robinson
Player of the match: Ali Brown

24 June
Scorecard

Durham Dynamos; 131/7	v	Yorkshire Carnegie; 90/9
Phil Mustard 26 (27); Tim Bresnan 3-26 (4)		Adil Rashid 28 (34); Ben Harmison 3-20 (4)

Durham won by 41 runs
Riverside Ground, Chester-le-Street
Umpires: NA Mallender and PJ Hartley
Player of the match: Ben Harmison

24 June
Scorecard

Lancashire Lightning; 220/5	v	Derbyshire Phantoms; 164/7
Andrew Flintoff 93 (41); Ian Hunter 2-37 (4)		Greg Smith 56 (42); Andrew Flintoff 2-32 (4)

Lancashire won by 56 runs
County Ground, Derby
Umpires: Richard Kettleborough and Vanburn Holder
Player of the match: Andrew Flintoff

26 June
Scorecard

Leicestershire Foxes; 164/6	v	Yorkshire Carnegie; 153/6
Jacques Du Toit 39 (16); Azeem Rafiq 2-21 (4)		Jacques Rudolph 61 (39); Wayne White 2-29 (4)

Leics won by 11 runs
Grace Road, Leicester
Umpires: Steven Patterson and Nick Cook
Player of the match: Claude Henderson

26 June
Scorecard

Derbyshire Phantoms; 165/6	v	Nottinghamshire Outlaws; 166/2
Graham Wagg 62 (43); Mark Ealham 3-20 (4)		Ali Brown 65 (42); Graham Wagg 1-18 (2)

Notts won by 8 wickets
Trent Bridge, Nottingham
Umpires: Michael Gough and Peter Hartley
Player of the match: Ali Brown

26 June

Durham Dynamos; Did not bat	v	Lancashire Lightning; Did not bat

Match abandoned

28 June
Scorecard

Leicestershire Foxes; 133/8	v	Durham Dynamos; 137/4
Boeta Dippenaar 63 (48); Mitchell Claydon 3-14 (4)		David Warner 44 (18); Claude Henderson 3-32 (4)

Durham won by 6 wickets
Grace Road, Leicester
Umpires: Peter Hartley and Tim Robinson
Player of the match: Mitchell Claydon

28 June
Scorecard

Nottinghamshire Outlaws; 173/7	v	Lancashire Lightning; 175/1
David Hussey 55 (31); Sajid Mahmood 2-26 (4)		Steven Croft 83 (47); Darren Pattinson 1-25 (4)

Lancashire won by 9 wickets
Trent Bridge, Nottingham
Umpires: Nick Cook and RJ Bailey
Player of the match: Steven Croft

28 June
Scorecard

Derbyshire Phantoms; 164/5	v	Yorkshire Carnegie; 127/10
Wavell Hinds 49 (41); Deon Kruis 1-28 (4)		Anthony McGrath 29 (24); Stuart Law 2-6 (0.5)

Lancashire won by 9 wickets
Headingley, Leeds
Umpires: JH Evans
Player of the match: Jake Needham and MA Gough

=== South Division ===
	Essex Eagles	Hampshire Hawks	Kent Spitfires	Middlesex Crusaders	Surrey Brown Caps	Sussex Sharks
Essex Eagles		Hampshire; 6 wickets	Essex; 36 runs	Essex; 8 wickets	Essex; 4 wickets	Sussex; 8 wickets
Hampshire Hawks	Hampshire; 75 runs		Kent; 7 wickets	Hampshire; 28 runs	Hampshire; 18 runs	Hampshire; 9 wickets
Kent Spitfires	No result	Kent; 8 runs		Kent; 4 wickets	Kent; 16 runs	Kent; 5 wickets
Middlesex Crusaders	Middlesex; 23 runs	Hampshire; 56 runs	Kent; 62 runs		Surrey; 57 runs	Sussex; 6 wickets
Surrey Brown Caps	Essex; 84 runs	Surrey; 1 run	Kent; 1 run	Middlesex; 7 wickets		Sussex; 21 runs
Sussex Sharks	Essex; 17 runs	Sussex; 8 wickets	Sussex; 2 runs D/L	Middlesex; 7 wickets	Sussex; 6 wickets	

Home team win	Away team win	Match abandoned

Pos	Team	Pld	W	L	T	NR	Pts	NRR
1	Kent Spitfires	10	7	2	0	1	15	0.639
2	Sussex Sharks	10	7	3	0	0	14	0.315
3	Hampshire Hawks	10	6	4	0	0	12	0.853
4	Essex Eagles	10	5	4	0	1	11	0.153
5	Surrey Brown Caps	10	2	8	0	0	4	−0.661
6	Middlesex Crusaders	10	2	8	0	0	4	−1.186

==== Results ====
25 May
Scorecard

Sussex Sharks; 133/8 (20 overs)	v	Hampshire Hawks; 137/1 (16.1 overs)
DR Smith 63 (47); H Riazuddin 3/15 [4]		JHK Adams 68* (49); DR Smith 1/27 [2]

Hampshire won by 9 wickets
Rose Bowl, Southampton
Umpires: JW Lloyds and JF Steele
Player of the match: H Riazuddin (Hampshire)

25 May
Scorecard

Essex Eagles; 187/7 (20 overs)	v	Kent Spitfires; 16/0 (3.2 overs)
AN Cook 80 (56); Azhar Mahmood 2/33 [4]		JL Denly 9* (10)

No result
St Lawrence Ground, Canterbury
Umpires: NL Bainton and Trevor Jesty
Player of the match: Not awarded

25 May
Scorecard

Surrey Brown Caps; 186/1 (20 overs)	v	Middlesex Panthers; 129/7 (20 overs)
U Afzaal 98* (59); CEW Silverwood 1/30 [4]		T Henderson 32 (23); CP Schofield 3/21 [4]

Surrey won by 57 runs
Lord's Cricket Ground, London
Umpires: MJD Bodenham and P Willey
Player of the match: U Afzaal (Surrey)

26 May
(day/night)
Scorecard

Sussex Sharks; 184/9 (20 overs)	v	Surrey Brown Caps; 163/9 (20 overs)
LJ Wright 58 (46); CP Schofield 2/32 [4]		SA Newman 38 (29); MH Yardy 3/21 [4]

Sussex won by 21 runs
The Oval, London
Umpires: NL Bainton and NGB Cook
Player of the match: LJ Wright (Sussex)

27 May
(day/night)
Scorecard

Kent Spitfires; 191/3 (20 overs)	v	Middlesex Panthers; 129/8 (20 overs)
M van Jaarsveld 75* (53); A Richardson 2/25 [4]		SD Udal 26* (18); JC Tredwell 2/14 [4]

Kent won by 62 runs
Lord's Cricket Ground, London
Umpires: MJD Bodenham and G Sharp
Player of the match: DI Stevens (Kent)

27 May
(day/night)
Scorecard

Surrey Brown Caps; 125/8 (20 overs)	v	Hampshire Hawks; 124/9 (20 overs)
SJ Walters 30 (22); LA Dawson 2/18 [4]		CC Benham 39 (37); GD Elliott 2/13 [4]

Surrey won by 1 run
The Oval, London
Umpires: NL Bainton and NGB Cook
Player of the match: GD Elliott (Surrey)

28 May
(day/night)
Scorecard

Sussex Sharks; 148 (19.4 overs)	v	Essex Eagles; 131 (19.1 overs)
RS Bopara 45 (31); Yasir Arafat 2/16 [3.4]		DR Smith 30 (23); CJC Wright 4/24 [4]

Essex won by 17 runs
County Ground, Hove
Umpires: MJD Bodenham and P Willey
Player of the match: CJC Wright (Essex)

29 May
(day/night)
Scorecard

Surrey Brown Caps; 165/5 (20 overs)	v	Essex Eagles; 169/6 (19.5 overs)
SA Newman 81* (60); DD Masters 2/34 [4]		RS Bopara 53 (41); MNW Spriegel 2/33 [4]

Essex won by 4 wickets
County Ground, Chelmsford
Umpires: IJ Gould and RK Illingworth
Player of the match: SA Newman (Surrey)

29 May
Scorecard

Middlesex Panthers; 104/6 (20 overs)	v	Kent Spitfires; 107/6 (18.2 overs)
T Henderson 31 (37); RH Joseph 2/14 [4]		R McLaren 31 (43); A Richardson 3/29 [4]

Kent won by 4 wickets
St Lawrence Ground, Canterbury
Umpires: NL Bainton and NJ Llong
Player of the match: RH Joseph (Kent)

29 May
Scorecard

Hampshire Hawks; 122/7 (20 overs)	v	Sussex Sharks; 128/2 (17.1 overs)
MA Carberry 36 (38); DR Smith 2/2 [1]		CD Nash 56* (47); Imran Tahir 1/25 [4]

Sussex won by 8 wickets
County Ground, Hove
Umpires: MJD Bodenham and P Willey
Player of the match: CD Nash (Sussex)

31 May
Scorecard

Hampshire Hawks; 191/6 (20 overs)	v	Surrey Brown Caps; 173/8 (20 overs)
MJ Lumb 54 (31); CP Schofield 2/32 [4]		MR Ramprakash 73 (47); DG Cork 2/22 [4]

Hampshire won by 18 runs
Rose Bowl, Southampton
Umpires: MJD Bodenham and NGC Cowley
Player of the match: MR Ramprakash (Surrey)

31 May
Scorecard

Sussex Sharks; 132/7 (20 overs)	v	Kent Spitfires; 133/5 (17 overs)
Yasir Arafat 43 (34); Azhar Mahmood 3/16 [4]		GO Jones 56 (39); RJ Kirtley 2/15 [2]

Kent won by 5 wickets
St Lawrence Ground, Canterbury
Umpires: NL Bainton and NGB Cook
Player of the match: GO Jones (Kent)

1 June
(day/night)
Scorecard

Essex Eagles; 205/4 (20 overs)	v	Kent Spitfires; 169/7 (20 overs)
AN Cook 77 (55); JC Tredwell 1/33 [4]		M van Jaarsveld 33 (25); GW Flower 3/26 [4]

Essex won by 36 runs
County Ground, Chelmsford
Umpires: NGB Cook and RT Robinson
Player of the match: GW Flower (Essex)

1 June
(day/night)
Scorecard

Middlesex Panthers; 116 (19.3 overs)	v	Sussex Sharks; 120/3 (16.3 overs)
GK Berg 33 (28); RJ Hamilton-Brown 3/15 [3]		RJ Hamilton-Brown 69 (47); DJ Malan 2/21 [4]

Sussex won by 7 wickets
County Ground, Hove
Umpires: NL Bainton and G Sharp
Player of the match: RJ Hamilton-Brown (Sussex)

2 June
(day/night)
Scorecard

Hampshire Hawks; 181/6 (20 overs)	v	Middlesex Panthers; 125 (19 overs)
MA Carberry 56 (51); SD Udal 2/23 [4]		BA Godleman 34 (38); SM Ervine 4/16 [4]

Hampshire won by 56 runs
Uxbridge Cricket Club Ground, London
Umpires: RJ Bailey and MA Gough
Player of the match: SM Ervine (Hampshire)

3 June
(day/night)
Scorecard

Essex Eagles; 126/7 (20 overs)	v	Sussex Sharks; 130/2 (18.2 overs)
V Chopra 26 (26); DR Smith 3/19 [4]		MW Goodwin 64* (54); MA Hardinges 2/12 [2]

Sussex won by 8 wickets
County Ground, Chelmsford
Umpires: PJ Hartley and RK Illingworth
Player of the match: V Chopra (Essex)

4 June
(day/night)
Scorecard

Hampshire Hawks; 219/2 (20 overs)	v	Essex Eagles; 144 (18.4 overs)
MJ Lumb 124* (69); MA Chambers 1/32 [4]		MJ Walker 50 (33); SM Ervine 3/19 [3]

Hampshire won by 75 runs
Rose Bowl, Southampton
Umpires: NGC Cowley and JF Steele
Player of the match: MJ Lumb (Hampshire)

4 June
(day/night)
Scorecard

Sussex Sharks; 131/3 (20 overs)	v	Kent Spitfires; 61/0 (11 overs)
DR Smith 69* (59); DI Stevens 1/11 [2]		JL Denly 32* (32)

Sussex won by 2 runs (D/L)
County Ground, Hove
Umpires: RJ Bailey and VA Holder
Player of the match: DR Smith (Sussex)

- Play was halted due to a floodlight failure;

22 June
(day/night)
Scorecard

Middlesex Panthers; 148 (19.2 overs)	v	Essex Eagles; 151/2 (19 overs)
DJ Malan 31 (22); Danish Kaneria 3/21 [3.2]		ML Pettini 80* (57); DJ Malan 1/17 [3]

Essex won by 8 wickets
County Ground, Chelmsford
Umpires: NGB Cook and G Sharp
Player of the match: ML Pettini (Essex)

22 June
Scorecard

Kent Spitfires; 182/4 (20 overs)	v	Hampshire Hawks; 174/7 (20 overs)
RWT Key 58* (52); AD Mascarenhas 2/19 [4]		MJ Lumb 59 (33); R McLaren 2/31 [4]

Kent won by 8 runs
Nevill Ground, Royal Tunbridge Wells
Umpires: NL Bainton and IJ Gould
Player of the match: DI Stevens (Kent)

22 June
Scorecard

Surrey Brown Caps; 123 (20 overs)	v	Sussex Sharks; 125/4 (16.5 overs)
MR Ramprakash 20 (14); RSC Martin-Jenkins 3/17 [3]		MW Goodwin 38 (43); U Afzaal 2/17 [2]

Sussex won by 6 wickets
County Ground, Hove
Umpires: MR Benson and MJD Bodenham
Player of the match: RSC Martin-Jenkins (Sussex)

23 June
Scorecard

Hampshire Hawks; 183/6 (20 overs)	v	Middlesex Panthers; 155/5 (20 overs)
MJ Lumb 93 (52); DJ Malan 1/10 [2]		BA Godleman 57 (47); CT Tremlett 2/28 [4]

Hampshire won by 28 runs
Rose Bowl, Southampton
Umpires: TE Jesty and JW Lloyds
Player of the match: MJ Lumb (Hampshire)

24 June
Scorecard

Kent Spitfires; 168/6 (20 overs)	v	Surrey Brown Caps; 167 (19.4 overs)
M van Jaarsveld 54 (32); CP Schofield 2/42 [4]		U Afzaal 62 (41); DI Stevens 2/21 [4]

Kent won by 1 run
The Oval, London
Umpires: NL Bainton and IJ Gould
Player of the match: M van Jaarsveld (Kent)

25 June
Scorecard

Essex Eagles; 210/3 (20 overs)	v	Surrey Brown Caps; 126 (15.2 overs)
AN Cook 100* (57); GD Elliott 2/37 [4]		U Afzaal 30 (16); Danish Kaneria 2/13 [2.2]

Essex won by 84 runs
The Oval, London
Umpires: RJ Bailey and TE Jesty
Player of the match: AN Cook (Essex)

26 June
Scorecard

Hampshire Hawks; 131/7 (20 overs)	v	Kent Spitfires; 132/3 (17.5 overs)
AD Mascarenhas 45* (36); R McLaren 2/17 [3]		DI Stevens 62* (42); AD Mascarenhas 1/21 [4]

Kent won by 7 wickets
Rose Bowl, Southampton
Umpires: RJ Bailey and MJD Bodenham
Player of the match: DI Stevens (Kent)

26 June
Scorecard

Middlesex Panthers; 166/5 (20 overs)	v	Essex Eagles; 143 (19.2 overs)
NJ Dexter 75 (51); Danish Kaneria 2/37 [4]		V Chopra 51 (42); T Henderson 3/34 [4]

Middlesex won by 23 runs
Lord's Cricket Ground, London
Umpires: NL Bainton and MR Benson
Player of the match: NJ Dexter (Middlesex)

27 June
Scorecard

Surrey Brown Caps; 160/5 (20 overs)	v	Middlesex Panthers; 162/3 (18.2 overs)
MJ Brown 77 (54); CEW Silverwood 1/27 [4]		OA Shah 61* (41); CJ Jordan 1/21 [3]

Middlesex won by 7 wickets
The Oval, London
Umpires: NL Bainton and DJ Millns
Player of the match: OA Shah (Middlesex)

28 June
Scorecard

Essex Eagles; 149/6 (20 overs)	v	Hampshire Hawks; 153/4 (19.1 overs)
GR Napier 47 (33); SM Ervine 3/26 [4]		SM Ervine 39 (22); GW Flower 3/25 [4]

Hampshire won by 6 wickets
County Ground, Chelmsford
Umpires: SA Garratt and JW Lloyds
Player of the match: SM Ervine (Hampshire)

28 June
Scorecard

Kent Spitfires; 184/7 (20 overs)	v	Surrey Brown Caps; 168/9 (20 overs)
M van Jaarsveld 64 (40); MNW Spriegel 4/33 [4]		CP Murtagh 28 (23); R McLaren 4/37 [4]

Kent won by 16 runs
County Ground, Beckenham
Umpires: VA Holder and DJ Millns
Player of the match: M van Jaarsveld (Kent)

28 June
Scorecard

Middlesex Panthers; 127/8 (20 overs)	v	Sussex Sharks; 130/4 (19 overs)
GK Berg 30 (20); Yasir Arafat 2/13 [4]		EC Joyce 41* (33); DA Burton 2/13 [4]

Sussex won by 6 wickets
Lord's Cricket Ground, London
Umpires: B Dudleston and JF Steele
Player of the match: CD Nash (Sussex)

== Knockout stage ==
Quarter-finals
M1	Northamptonshire Steelbacks	134/6
S3	Hampshire Hawks	121
S2	Sussex Sharks	152/9
M2	Warwickshire Bears	114
N1	Lancashire Lightning
M3	Somerset Sabres	Bowl
S1	Kent Spitfires	149/7
N2	Durham Dynamos	93

Semi-finals
M1	Northamptonshire Steelbacks	136/6
S2	Sussex Sharks	137/3
M3	Somerset Sabres	146/3
S1	Kent Spitfires	145/5

Final
S2	Sussex Sharks	172/7
M3	Somerset Sabres	109

=== Quarter-finals ===
27 July 2009
Scorecard

Kent Spitfires; 149/7 (20 overs)	v	Durham Dynamos; 93 (17.2 overs)
JL Denly 31 (30); BW Harmison 3/24 [3]		DM Benkenstein 47 (42); JC Tredwell 3/18 [4]

Kent won by 56 runs
St Lawrence Ground, Canterbury
Umpires: B Dudleston and JH Evans
Player of the match: JC Tredwell (Kent)

27 July 2009
Scorecard

Sussex Sharks; 152/9 (20 overs)	v	Warwickshire Bears; 114 (19 overs)
LJ Wright 38 (31); R Clarke 2/21 [2]		IJL Trott 56 (47); RJ Hamilton-Brown 4/15 [3]

Sussex won by 38 runs
County Ground, Hove
Umpires: TE Jesty and JW Lloyds
Player of the match: RJ Hamilton-Brown (Sssx)

28–30 July 2009
Scorecard

Lancashire Lightning	v	Somerset Sabres

Abandoned; Somerset win bowl-out 5–1.
Old Trafford, Manchester
Umpires: PJ Hartley and RT Robinson

- No play on 28, 29 or 30 July due to rain. 2 reserve days used.

29–30 July 2009
Scorecard

Northamptonshire Steelbacks; 134/6 (20 overs)	v	Hampshire Hawks; 121 (19.4 overs)
AJ Hall 39 (24); SM Ervine 2/8 [2]		AD Mascarenhas 36 (24); AJ Hall 3/25 [3.4]

Northamptonshire won by 13 runs
County Ground, Northampton
Umpires: NL Bainton and NA Mallender
Player of the match: AJ Hall (N'hants)

- Reserve day used.

=== Finals Day ===
==== Semi-finals ====
15 August 2009
Scorecard

Northamptonshire Steelbacks; 136/6 (20 overs)	v	Sussex Sharks; 137/3 (19.4 overs)
N Boje 34 (29); Yasir Arafat 2/28 [4) runs2 = MW Goodwin 80* (67)		AJ Hall 2/20 [3.4]

Sussex won by 7 wickets
Edgbaston, Birmingham
Umpires: RK Illingworth and RA Kettleborough
Player of the match: MW Goodwin (Sssx)

15 August 2009
Scorecard

Kent Spitfires; 145/5 (20 overs)	v	Somerset Sabres; 146/3 (18.5 overs)
DI Stevens 77 (51); AC Thomas 2/26 [4]		ME Trescothick 56 (32); JC Tredwell 2/25 [4]

Somerset won by 7 wickets
Edgbaston, Birmingham
Umpires: RJ Bailey and IJ Gould
Player of the match: ME Trescothick (Somst)

==== Final ====
15 August 2009
Scorecard

Sussex Sharks; 172/7 (20 overs)	v	Somerset Sabres; 109 (17.2 overs)
DR Smith 59 (26); MTC Waller 2/33 [3]		ME Trescothick 33 (15); RJ Kirtley 3/9 [2]

Sussex won by 63 runs
Edgbaston, Birmingham
Umpires: RK Illingworth and RA Kettleborough
Player of the match: DR Smith (Sussex)

== See also ==
- Twenty20 Cup
- Friends Provident t20
- 2008 Twenty20 Cup
