= British Asian Cup =

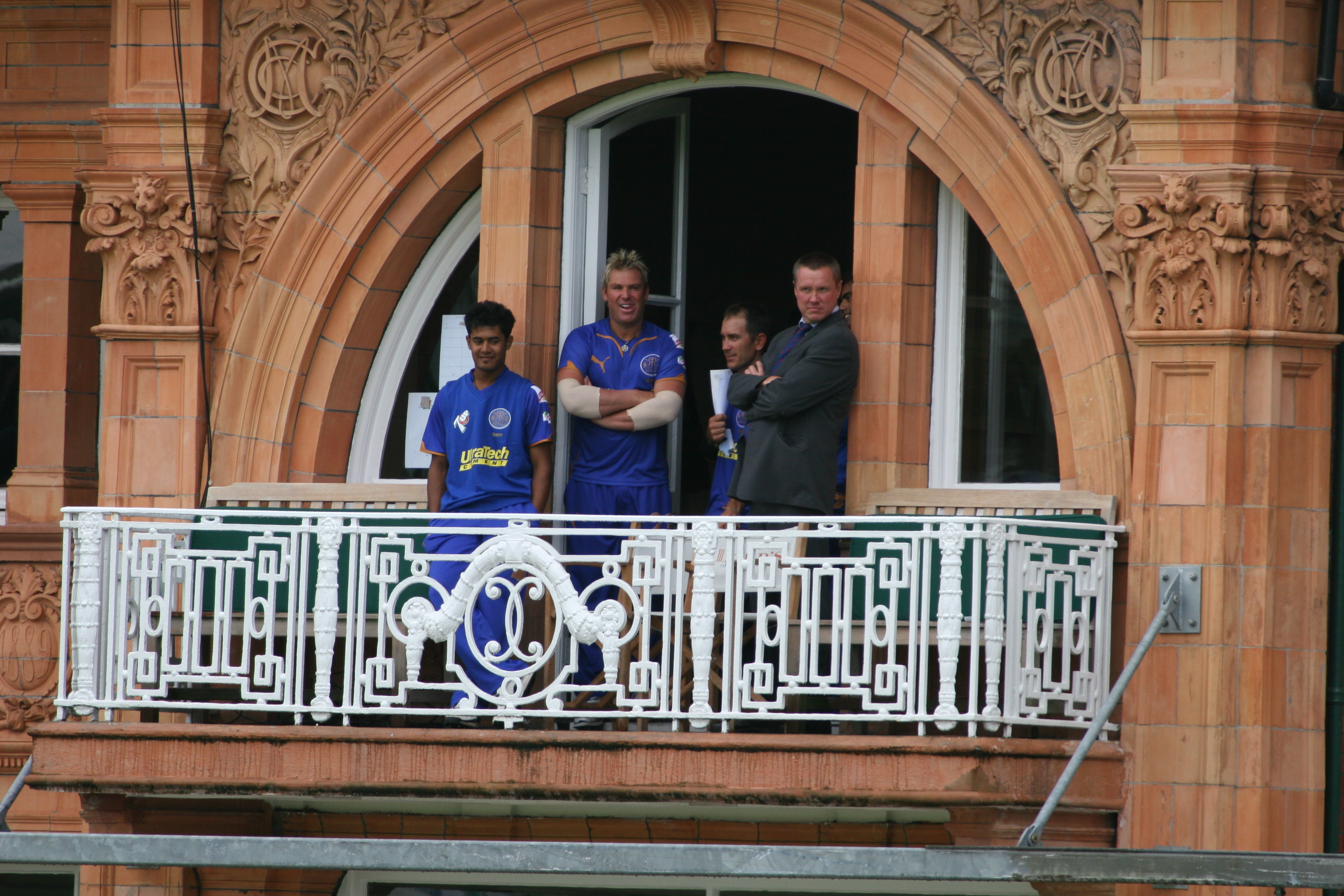
Rajasthan Royals	Middlesex Panthers
162/5	116/7
20	20
- Date: 6 July 2009
- Venue: Lord's Cricket Ground, London
- Umpires: Trevor Jesty; David Millns
- Attendance: 20,000

The British Asian Cup was a day/night Twenty20 cricket charity match played between the 2008 Indian Premier League (IPL) champion Rajasthan Royals and the 2008 Twenty20 Cup champion Middlesex Panthers played at the Lord's Cricket Ground, London, England. (Note: The Panthers were known as Middlesex Crusaders at the time of winnings the 2008 Twenty20 Cup) A portion of the earnings of the match went to the British Asian Trust. It ended as the Royals defeated the Panthers by 46 runs.

Shaun Udal and Shane Warne were the captains for the Panthers and the Royals respectively. The Royals played a warm-up game with the Middlesex Second XI before the match, and won it by 28 runs. The match attracted a crowd of 20,000 people, but was delayed due to rain.

Winning the toss, the Panthers opted to bowl first. The Royals scored 162 runs for five wickets, and Swapnil Asnodkar and Mohammad Kaif top-scored with 41 run each. Dawid Malan took two wickets for 23 runs. In reply, the Panthers made 116 runs for seven wickets, as the Royals won by 46 runs. Sohail Tanvir took three wickets for 20 runs, and Dimitri Mascarenhas was named the man of the match for his all-round performance.

== Background ==
On 14 May 2009, it was announced that 2008 IPL champion Rajasthan Royals and 2008 Twenty20 Cup champion Middlesex Panthers will play a charity match on 6 July 2009 under the name of the British Asian Cup, a portion of the earnings of which will go to the British Asian Trust. The two teams would have played each other in the 2008 Champions League Twenty20, but the tournament was cancelled due to security reasons. The then IPL chairman Lalit Modi said,"We have shown this year that the IPL truly has global appeal, and for one of our teams to be playing at the 'home of cricket [Lords]' in front of the wonderfully passionate British fans is very exciting." He also welcomed the association with the British Asian Trust. Marlyebone Cricket Club (MCC) chief executive Keith Bradshaw said,"It is a great honour to be hosting the first year of this competition, and demonstrates the MCC commitment to globalising our brand and venue." It was planned that the British Asian Cup will be an annual series played between the IPL and Twenty20 Cup winners, and will consist of three matches in future.

== Build up ==
Udal and Warne captained the Panthers and the Royals respectively. Tyron Henderson, who had played for the Royals in the IPL, decided to play for the Panthers. Sohail Tanvir played for the Royals after getting the permission of the Pakistan Cricket Board. Tanvir was not able to play in the 2009 IPL due to tense relations between India and Pakistan after the 2008 Mumbai attacks. However it was later decided to move the 2009 edition to South Africa due to 2009 Indian general election, but till then the Pakistani players were either terminated or suspended by their franchisees due to their unavailability. Kamran Akmal could not play for the Royals in the match because of Sri Lanka's tour of Pakistan. It was also the last competitive game Warne played at the Lord's Cricket Ground.

The Royals played a warm-up game with the Middlesex Second XI at Denis Compton Oval on 5 July 2009. Captained by Mohammad Kaif, the Royals won the toss elected to bat first. The scored 139 runs at a loss of seven wickets, and Faiz Fazal top scored with 47 runs. Batting second, the Middlesex Second XI got all out at 111 runs in the last over. Munaf Patel took three wickets, and the Royals won by 28 runs.

== Match ==
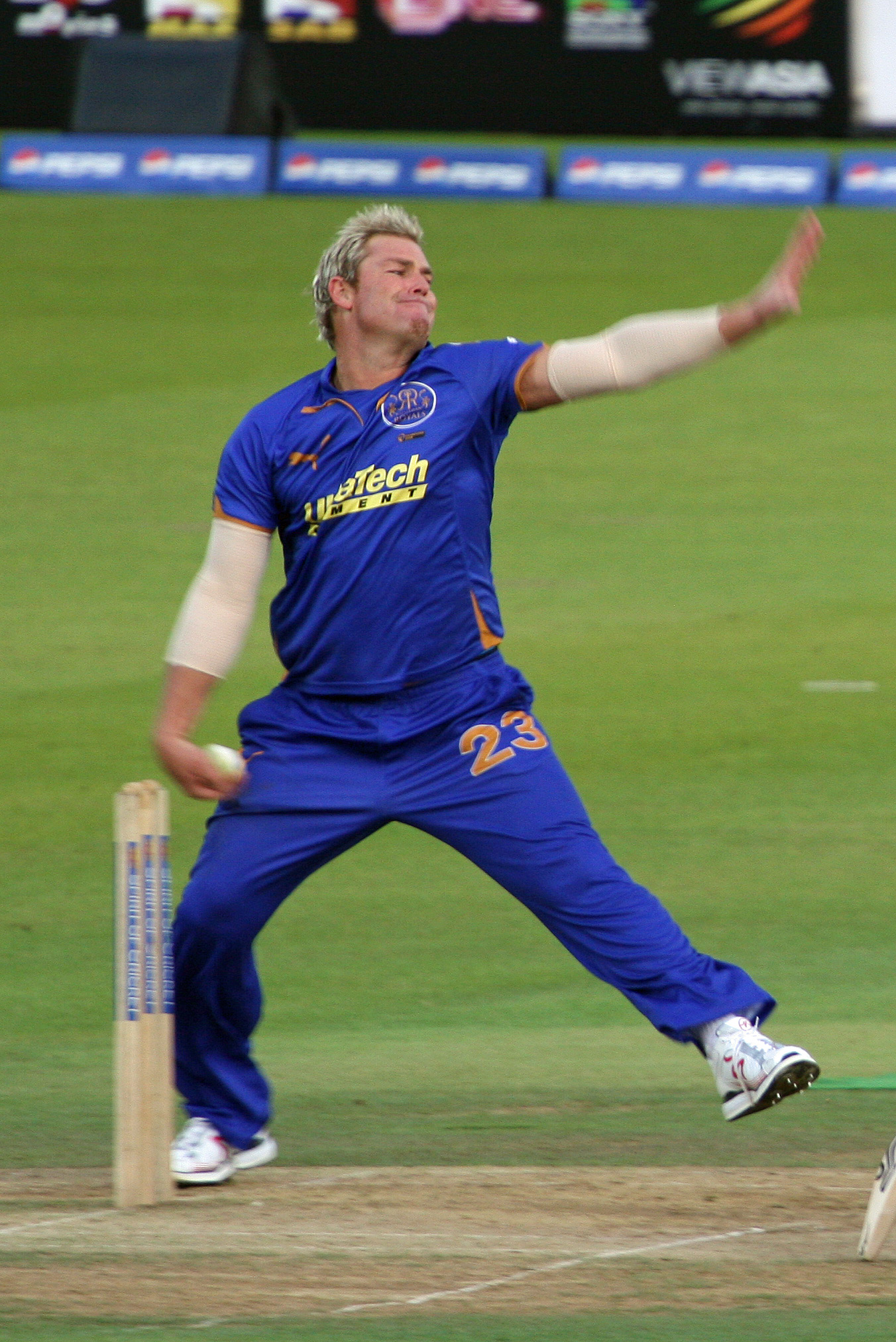
Warne bowling in the match. This was the last competitive game played by Warne at the Lord's Cricket Ground.

The match attracted a crowd of 20,000 people and was a day/night event. The match was scheduled to start at 4:21 GMT, but it started raining heavily and the play was stopped. However the rain stopped at 4:25 GMT and the toss took place. The Panthers won the toss and decided to bowl first. Fazal and Swapnil Asnodkar opened for the Royals and Gareth Berg bowled the first over. Murali Karthik came to the attack in the seventh over. In the first ball of the over, a shot by Ashnodkar was deflected by the wicket-keeper's helmet, and the Royals got five penalty runs. In the same over, Fazal and Asnodkar reached to a 50 runs partnership in 38 balls. However Karthik took the wicket of Fazal in the fifth ball. Fazal tried to hit play the ball towards extra cover, but it went high in the air and Billy Godleman took the catch. Fazal went out making 27 runs off 22 balls, hitting two sixes. Karthik slowed down the run rate, and no boundary was hit in the next six overs. Kaif and Ashnodkar added 50 runs in 45 balls for the second wicket, but Ashnodkar got dismissed in the very next ball. Dawid Malan bowled a full toss and Ashnodkar hit it towards deep mid-wicket, however Shah took "well judged" catch. Ashnodkar made 41 runs off 40 balls. In the next over, Eoin Morgan dropped Naman Ojha on Shaun Udal. However Ojha got caught by Steven Finn on the next ball. Ojha made 10 run off 5 balls. In the next over, Malan bowled Justin Langer, who scored one run in two balls. The next over, bowled by Henderson, came out to be the most expensive over of the innings; 15 runs were scored in the over. Mascarenhas hit a four and a six, and the Royals reached to 145 runs. The next over was bowled by Berg, who gave seven runs. In the last ball of the innings, Kaif got run out on 41 runs. The Royals scored 162 runs at a loss of five wickets in 20 overs. Mascarenhas remained not out on 32 runs off 16 balls. Malan took two wickets for the Panthers giving 23 runs.

The Panthers opened with Godleman and Neil Dexter. The first wicket felt in the fourth over; Tanvir bowled Godleman, who went on four runs. Mascarenhas took the important wicket of Owais Shah in the next over, as Shah went for one run. In the first ball of the seventh over, Ojha dropped Dexter, however Mascarenhas bowled him on 26 runs on the third ball of the same over. Mascarenhas took two wickets for 24 runs in his four over spell. Malan and Morgan scored 45 runs for the fourth wicket partnership, before Ojha caught Morgan on Tanvir. Morgan went out making 15 runs on 19 balls. Henderson got out in the same over, getting caught by Mascarenhas; he went out scoring one run. Ojha stumped Malan on Warne in the next over, and he went for 34 runs. The Panthers required 79 runs in the last four overs. Berg, who scored 26 runs, went out in the last over as Fazal caught him on Abhishek Raut. The Panthers could only manage to 116 runs for even wickets, and the Royals won by 46 runs. Tanvir took three wickets for 20 runs. Mascarenhas was named the man of the match for his "all-round effort".

=== Scorecard ===
- On-field umpires: Trevor Jesty (England), David Millns (England)
- Third umpire: Stephen Gale (England)
- Toss: Panthers elected to field first
- Result: Royals won by 46 runs

Rajasthan Royals batting innings
Batsman	Method of dismissal	Runs	Balls	Strike rate
Faiz Fazal	c Godleman b Kartik	27	22	122.72
Swapnil Asnodkar	c Shah b Malan	41	40	102.50
Mohammad Kaif	run out († Scott/Finn)	41	35	117.14
Naman Ojha †	c Finn b Udal	10	5	200.00
Justin Langer	b Malan	1	2	50.00
Dimitri Mascarenhas	not out	32	16	200.00
Abhishek Raut	did not bat	–	–	–
Sohail Tanvir	did not bat	–	–	–
Shane Warne *	did not bat	–	–	–
Munaf Patel	did not bat	–	–	–
Amit Singh	did not bat	–	–	–
Extras	(4 byes, 1 leg byes, 5 penalty)	10		
Totals	(20 overs)	162/5		

Middlesex Panthers bowling
Bowler	Overs	Maidens	Runs	Wickets	Economy
Gareth Berg	3	0	14	0	4.66
Steven Finn	3	0	29	0	9.26
Tyron Henderson	3	0	32	0	10.66
Murali Kartik	4	0	18	1	4.50
Shaun Udal	4	0	36	1	9.00
Dawid Malan	3	0	23	2	7.66

Middlesex Panthers batting innings
Batsman	Method of dismissal	Runs	Balls	Strike rate
Billy Godleman	b Tanvir	4	7	57.14
Neil Dexter	b Mascarenhas	26	24	108.33
Owais Shah	lbw b Mascarenhas	1	5	20.00
Eoin Morgan	c Ojha b Tanvir	15	19	78.94
Dawid Malan	st † Ojha b Warne	34	34	100.00
Tyron Henderson	c Mascarenhas b Tanvir	1	3	33.33
Gareth Berg	c Fazal b Raut	26	18	144.44
Ben Scott *	not out	7	9	77.77
Shaun Udal	not out	1	1	100.00
Murali Kartik	did not bat	–	–	–
Steven Finn	did not bat	–	–	–
Extras	(1 wide)	1		
Totals	(20 overs)	116/7		

Rajasthan Royals bowling
Bowler	Overs	Maidens	Runs	Wickets	Economy
Dimitri Mascarenhas	4	0	24	2	6.00
Sohail Tanvir	4	0	20	3	5.00
Amit Singh	2	0	5	0	2.50
Munaf Patel	3	0	21	0	7.00
Shane Warne	4	0	24	1	6.00
Abhishek Raut	3	0	22	1	7.33

Key

- * – Captain
- † – Wicket-keeper
- c Fielder – the batsman was dismissed by a catch by the named fielder
- b Bowler – the bowler who gains credit for the dismissal
- b – the batsman was dismissed by bowled
- lbw – the batsman was dismissed leg before wicket
- Total runs are in the format: score/wickets
