= Hodnett =

Hodnett is an English habitational surname related to the Hodnet village. Notable people with the surname include:

- Charlie Hodnett (1861–1890), American baseball player
- Claire Hodnett, English rugby union referee
- George Desmond Hodnett (1918–1990), Irish musician, songwriter and music critic
- Grant Hodnett (born 1982), South African-born English cricketer
- Joe Hodnett (1896–1978), English footballer
- Kyle Hodnett (born 1986), South African-born English cricketer
- John Hodnett (born 1999), Irish rugby union player
