= 2008 Twenty20 Cup =

- Dates: 11 June 2008 – 26 July 2008
- Administrator: England and Wales Cricket Board
- Cricket format: Twenty20
- Tournament format(s): Group stage and knockout
- Champions: Middlesex (1st title)
- Participants: 18
- Matches: 97
- Attendance: 583,642 (6,017 per match)
- Most runs: Joe Denly (451 for Kent)
- Most wickets: Yasir Arafat (23 for Kent)

The 2008 Twenty20 Cup was the sixth edition of what would later become the T20 Blast tournament, and saw Middlesex Crusaders winning the tournament after a thrilling climax to the final against the reigning champions, the Kent Spitfires.

The tournament began on 11 June 2008 before culminating in Finals Day, held at The Rose Bowl, Southampton on 26 July. The number of games rose from 79 to 97, as all teams played each other twice in the group stage.

== Group stage ==
=== Midlands/West/Wales Division ===
Pos	Team	Pld	W	L	T	NR	Pts	NRR
1	Warwickshire Bears	10	6	1	1	2	15	0.694
2	Northamptonshire Steelbacks	10	6	3	0	1	13	0.431
3	Glamorgan Dragons	10	3	3	0	4	10	−0.176
4	Somerset Sabres	10	3	4	0	3	9	0.313
5	Worcestershire Royals	10	3	6	0	1	7	−0.488
6	Gloucestershire Gladiators	10	1	5	1	3	6	−0.931

==== Results ====
11 June 2008
Scorecard

Warwickshire Bears; 140/7 (19 overs)	v	Glamorgan Dragons
Ian Bell 42 (35); Dean Cosker 3/32 (4)

No result
SWALEC Stadium, Cardiff
Umpires: Jeff Evans and Ian Gould
Player of the match: Not awarded

- Rain stopped play after 12 overs of Warwickshire's innings, reducing it to 19 overs per team, before further rain during the interval forced an abandonment.

11 June 2008
Scorecard

Northants Steelbacks; 201/4 (20 overs)	v	Somerset Sabres; 176/7 (20 overs)
David Sales 71* (45); Alfonso Thomas 2/39 (4)		Marcus Trescothick 69 (32); Nicky Boje 2/19 (4)

Northamptonshire won by 25 runs
County Ground, Taunton
Umpires: Nigel Llong and Tim Robinson
Player of the match: David Sales

12 June 2008
Scorecard

Gloucs Gladiators; 168/9 (20 overs)	v	Worcestershire Royals; 169/1 (18 overs)
Marcus North 45 (33); Kabir Ali 2/23 (4)		Graeme Hick 88* (58); Anthony Ireland 1/32 (3)

Worcestershire won by 9 wickets
New Road, Worcester
Umpires: Barry Dudleston and Nigel Llong
Player of the match: Graeme Hick

13 June 2008
Scorecard

Glamorgan Dragons; 170/5 (20 overs)	v	Somerset Sabres; 156/8 (20 overs)
Herschelle Gibbs 43 (35); Wes Durston 2/20 (2)		Justin Langer 62 (43); Robert Croft 3/12 (4)

Glamorgan won by 14 runs
SWALEC Stadium, Cardiff
Umpires: Neil Mallender and John Steele
Player of the match: Robert Croft

13 June 2008
Scorecard

Gloucs Gladiators; 158/4 (20 overs)	v	Warwickshire Bears; 158/6 (20 overs)
Hamish Marshall 46 (33); Ant Botha 3/22 (4)		Tony Frost 53 (33); Jon Lewis 3/22 (4)

Match tied
Nevil Road, Bristol
Umpires: Richard Illingworth and Trevor Jesty
Player of the match: Tony Frost

13 June 2008
Scorecard

Northamptonshire Steelbacks; 182/4 (20 overs)	v	Worcestershire Royals; 149 (19.4 overs)
AJ Hall 66* (51); GM Andrew 2-20 [4]		BF Smith 46 (35); AJ Hall 6-21 [3.4]

Northamptonshire won by 33 runs
Wantage Road, Northampton, England
Umpires: RJ Bailey (Eng) and RT Robinson (Eng)

14 June 2008
Scorecard

Somerset Sabres; 131 (19.5 overs)	v	Warwickshire Bears; 132/5 (19.5 overs)
ME Trescothick 48 (41); CR Woakes 4-21 [3.5]		IJ Westwood 35* (29); ML Turner 2-33 [4]

Warwickshire won by 5 wickets
County Ground, Taunton, England
Umpires: RK Illingworth (Eng) and MJ Harris (Eng)

14 June 2008

Glamorgan Dragons; Did not bat	v	Worcestershire Royals; Did not bat

Abandoned

17 June 2008
Scorecard

Northamptonshire Steelbacks; 162/5 (20 overs)	v	Gloucestershire Gladiators; 135 (18.4 overs)
MH Wessels 43* (23); MA Hardinges 1-18 [4]		MJ North 36 (29); J Louw 3-18 [3]

Northamptonshire won by 27 runs
Nevil Road, Bristol, England
Umpires: NGC Cowley (Eng) and NA Mallender (Eng)

17 June 2008
Scorecard

Gloucestershire Gladiators; 170/7 (20 overs)	v	Northamptonshire Steelbacks; 171/4 (18.2 overs)
HJH Marshall 59 (33); J Louw 2-28 [4]		RA White 94* (57); WD Rudge 2-26 [3.2]

Northamptonshire won by 6 wickets
Campbell Park, Milton Keynes, England
Umpires: B Leadbeater (Eng) and JF Steele (Eng)

17 June 2008
Scorecard

Somerset Sabres; 185/6 (20 overs)	v	Glamorgan Dragons; 170/5 (20 overs)
PD Trego 79 (50); DS Harrison 2-30 [4]		HH Gibbs 76* (51); ML Turner 2-31 [3]

Somerset won by 15 runs
County Ground, Taunton, England
Umpires: TE Jesty (Eng) and GI Burgess (Eng)

17 June 2008
Scorecard

Worcestershire Royals; 141/4 (20 overs)	v	Warwickshire Bears; 144/3 (18.2 overs)
VS Solanki 50 (48); IDK Salisbury 2-24 [4]		IJL Trott 61* (49)

Warwickshire won by 7 wickets
New Road, Worcester, England
Umpires: PJ Hartley (Eng) and VA Holder (WI)

17 June 2008

Glamorgan Dragons; Did not bat	v	Gloucestershire Gladiators; Did not bat

Abandoned

19 June 2008
Scorecard

Northamptonshire Steelbacks; 102/9 (20 overs)	v	Warwickshire Bears; 106/1 (15.4 overs)
J Louw 21* (19); AG Botha 3-15 [4]		NM Carter 52 (28); JF Brown 1-28 [4]

Warwickshire won by 9 wickets
Campbell Park, Milton Keynes, England
Umpires: MJ Harris (Eng) and PJ Hartley (Eng)

19 June 2008
Scorecard

Somerset Sabres; 176/7 (20 overs)	v	Worcestershire Royals; 166/6 (20 overs)
PD Trego 47 (37); K Ali 3-30 [4]		GA Hick 63 (47); AC Thomas 4-27 [4]

Somerset won by 10 runs
New Road, Worcester, England
Umpires: NL Bainton (Eng) and AA Jones (Eng) GA Hick; 63 (47), 64 mins - 5 x 4's, 2 x 6's

19 June 2008
Scorecard

Glamorgan Dragons; 154/6 (17 overs)	v	Northamptonshire Steelbacks; 147/9 (17 overs)
RDB Croft 46 (28); AJ Hall 2-36 [4]		RA White 35 (24); RE Watkins 2-20 [2]

Glamorgan won by 10 runs (D/L)
SWALEC Stadium, Cardiff, Wales
Umpires: SA Garratt (Eng) and P Willey (Eng)
Match reduced to 17 overs a team.

19 June 2008

Somerset Sabres; Did not bat	v	Gloucestershire Gladiators; Did not bat

Abandoned

19 June 2008
Scorecard

Warwickshire Bears; 151/5 (20 overs)	v	Worcestershire Royals; 113 (19 overs)
IJL Trott 37 (31); DKH Mitchell 2-19 [4]		GA Hick 28 (23); IDK Salisbury 3-18 [4]

Warwickshire won by 38 runs
Edgbaston, Birmingham, England
Umpires: AA Jones (Eng) and G Sharp (Eng)

22 June 2008
Scorecard

Northamptonshire Steelbacks; 207/4 (20 overs)	v	Glamorgan Dragons; 183/8 (20 overs)
NJ O'Brien 69 (37); RE Watkins 2-30 [4]		HH Gibbs 98 (52); AJ Hall 5-29 [4]

Northamptonshire won by 24 runs
Wantage Road, Northampton, England
Umpires: RJ Bailey (Eng) and G Sharp (Eng)

22 June 2008
Scorecard

Somerset Sabres; 212/8 (20 overs)	v	Worcestershire Royals; 145 (16.4 overs)
ME Trescothick 107 (57); K Ali 4-44 [4]		SC Moore 38 (24); AC Thomas 2-17 [2.4]

Somerset won by 67 runs
County Ground, Taunton, England
Umpires: RA Kettleborough (Eng) and JF Steele (Eng)

22 June 2008
Scorecard

Gloucestershire Gladiators; 131 (19.4 overs)	v	Warwickshire Bears; 134/2 (17 overs)
CG Taylor 66 (43); CS Martin 3-33 [4]		IJL Trott 50* (48); AJ Harris 2-35 [4]

Warwickshire won by 8 wickets
Edgbaston, Birmingham, England
Umpires: GI Burgess (Eng) and SA Garratt (Eng)

24 June 2008
Scorecard

Glamorgan Dragons; 130/6 (20 overs)	v	Gloucestershire Gladiators; 135/3 (18.4 overs)
MJ Powell 33 (31); ID Fisher 3-20 [4]		WTS Porterfield 62 (57); RE Watkins 1-12 [2]

Gloucestershire won by 7 wickets
Nevil Road, Bristol, England
Umpires: MJ Harris (Eng) and G Sharp (Eng)

24 June 2008
Scorecard

Somerset Sabres; 173/6 (20 overs)	v	Warwickshire Bears; 177/6 (19.4 overs)
JL Langer 44 (22); TD Groenewald 3-40 [4]		JO Troughton 57 (30); ID Blackwell 2-34 [4]

Warwickshire won by 4 wickets
Edgbaston, Birmingham, England
Umpires: RJ Bailey (Eng) and P Willey (Eng)

24 June 2008
Scorecard

Northamptonshire Steelbacks; 160/7 (20 overs)	v	Worcestershire Royals; 163/6 (18.5 overs)
AJ Hall 58 (51); CD Whelan 2-24 [3]		SC Moore 51 (36); N Boje 2-29 [4]

Worcestershire won by 4 wickets
New Road, Worcester, England
Umpires: SA Garratt (Eng) and JW Lloyds (Eng)

25 June 2008
Scorecard

Worcestershire Royals; 152/8 (20 overs)	v	Gloucestershire Gladiators; 93 (16 overs)
SC Moore 41 (24); MA Hardinges 4-30 [4]		MA Hardinges 27 (27); DKH Mitchell 4-11 [3]

Worcestershire won by 59 runs
Nevil Road, Bristol, England
Umpires: MJ Harris (Eng) and G Sharp (Eng)

26 June 2008
Scorecard

Somerset Sabres; 137/9 (20 overs)	v	Northamptonshire Steelbacks; 20/0 (2 overs)
OAC Banks 50* (39); J Louw 3-24 [4]		NJ O'Brien 14* (5); RA White 5* (7)

No Result
Wantage Road, Northampton, England
Umpires: NA Mallender (Eng) and NJ Llong (Eng)

27 June 2008

Gloucestershire Gladiators; Did not bat	v	Somerset Sabres; Did not bat

Abandoned

27 June 2008
Scorecard

Northamptonshire Steelbacks; 137/8 (20 overs)	v	Warwickshire Bears; 124/8 (20 overs)
DJG Sales 42 (37); IDK Salisbury 3-14 [4]		IJL Trott 26 (21); J Louw 2-21 [4]

Northamptonshire won by 13 runs
Edgbaston, Birmingham, England
Umpires: NL Bainton (Eng) and JW Lloyds (Eng)

27 June 2008
Scorecard

Worcestershire Royals; 141/8 (20 overs)	v	Glamorgan Dragons; 142/4 (18.5 overs)
GA Hick 59 (45); RE Watkins 2-21 [3]		JWM Dalrymple 38* (24); K Ali 1-16 [4]

Glamorgan won by 6 wickets
New Road, Worcester, England
Umpires: PJ Hartley (Eng) and P Willey (Eng)

=== North Division ===
Pos	Team	Pld	W	L	T	NR	Pts	NRR
1	Durham Dynamos	10	6	1	1	2	15	0.984
2	Lancashire Lightning	10	6	3	0	1	13	0.921
3	Yorkshire Carnegie^{1}	10	5	3	1	1	10	−0.312
4	Nottinghamshire Outlaws	10	4	5	0	1	9	0.027
5	Derbyshire Phantoms	10	3	7	0	0	6	−0.421
6	Leicestershire Foxes	10	2	7	0	1	5	−0.893

^{1} The match on 27 June at the Riverside between Nottinghamshire and Yorkshire had no points awarded after it was found that Yorkshire had fielded an ineligible player. The ECB received allegations about Yorkshire fielding an ineligible player in their final group game. In an original meeting on 10 July, Yorkshire were summoned to Old Trafford and were told that they were to be thrown out of the tournament, with Nottinghamshire to be reinstated in the draw. However, Yorkshire appealed and at a second meeting held on 14 July, their appeal was heard and rejected, but this time Glamorgan were placed into the draw on a superior run rate. This was because Nottinghamshire were not awarded the points to the 27 June game.

==== Results ====
11 June 2008
Scorecard

Derbyshire Phantoms; 114/9 (20 overs)	v	Durham Dynamos; 48/5 (6.5 overs)
Greg Smith 47 (28); Paul Collingwood 5/14 (4)		Will Smith 19 (12); Nayan Doshi 3/1 (1)

Durham won by 5 wickets (D/L)
Riverside Ground, Chester-le-Street
Umpires: Richard Kettleborough and Jeremy Lloyds
Player of the match: Paul Collingwood

- Rain fell during the interval, Durham target reduced to 48 runs from 7 overs.

11 June 2008
Scorecard

Lancashire Lightning; 157/7 (20 overs)	v	Leicestershire Foxes; 105 (18.2 overs)
Francois du Plessis 45 (34); Jeremy Snape 2/18 (3)		Paul Nixon 37 (32); Steven Croft 3/6 (2.2)

Lancashire won by 52 runs
Grace Road, Leicester
Umpires: Peter Hartley and Barrie Leadbeater
Player of the match: Francois du Plessis

12 June 2008
Scorecard

Derbyshire Phantoms; 181/2 (20 overs)	v	Yorkshire Carnegie; 134/9 (20 overs)
Greg Smith 100* (62); Tim Bresnan 1/32 (4)		Anthony McGrath 55 (43); Charl Langeveldt 4/9 (4)

Derbyshire won by 47 runs
Headingley, Leeds
Umpires: Nigel Cowley and Jeremy Lloyds
Player of the match: Greg Smith

13 June 2008
Scorecard

Derbyshire Phantoms; 111 (17.4 overs)	v	Lancashire Lightning; 112/0 (16 overs)
James Pipe 31 (15); Gary Keedy 4/15 (3.4)		Mal Loye 54* (51); Lou Vincent 50* (46)

Lancashire won by 10 wickets
County Ground, Derby
Umpires: Nigel Llong and Vanburn Holder
Player of the match: Gary Keedy

13 June 2008
Scorecard

Leicestershire Foxes; 142/8 (20 overs)	v	Durham Dynamos; 147/4 (18 overs)
Boeta Dippenaar 47 (41); Albie Morkel 4/30 (4)		Dale Benkenstein 48* (35); Claude Henderson 2/15 (4)

Durham won by 6 wickets
Grace Road, Leicester
Umpires: Barry Dudleston and George Sharp
Player of the match: Dale Benkenstein

13 June 2008
Scorecard

Yorkshire Carnegie; 141/8 (15 overs)	v	Nottinghamshire Outlaws; 143/6 (14.2 overs)
A McGrath 32 (19); CE Shreck 2-20 [3]		WI Jefferson 40 (19); RM Pyrah 3-28 [3]

Nottinghamshire won by 4 wickets
Headingley, Leeds, England
Umpires: NGC Cowley (Eng) and JW Lloyds (Eng)
Match reduced to 15 overs a team.

14 June 2008
Scorecard

Nottinghamshire Outlaws; 166/6 (20 overs)	v	Durham Dynamos; 143/8 (20 overs)
SR Patel 56 (45); SM Pollock 2-23 [4]		WR Smith 41 (32); RS Ferley 3-17 [4]

Nottinghamshire won by 23 runs
Trent Bridge, Nottingham, England
Umpires: NL Bainton (Eng) and JW Holder (Eng)

15 June 2008
Scorecard

Yorkshire Carnegie; 169/5 (20 overs)	v	Derbyshire Phantoms; 158/6 (20 overs)
A McGrath 72* (42); R Clarke 2-32 [4]		GM Smith 68 (42); C White 1-0 [0.1]

Yorkshire won by 11 runs
Queen's Park, Chesterfield, England
Umpires: GI Burgess (Eng) and RT Robinson (Eng)

15 June 2008
Scorecard

Lancashire Lightning; 167 (20 overs)	v	Leicestershire Foxes; 130/8 (20 overs)
KW Hogg 44 (24); J Allenby 5-21 [3]		HD Ackerman 63 (54); SJ Marshall 4-21 [4]

Lancashire won by 37 runs
Old Trafford Cricket Ground, Manchester, England
Umpires: RA Kettleborough (Eng) and P Willey (Eng)

16 June 2008
Scorecard

Nottinghamshire Outlaws; 144/9 (20 overs)	v	Derbyshire Phantoms; 148/7 (20 overs)
AC Voges 52 (39); GG Wagg 3-23 [4]		WW Hinds 45 (36); SR Patel 3-22 [4]

Derbyshire won by 3 wickets
Trent Bridge, Nottingham, England
Umpires: RJ Bailey (Eng) and AA Jones (Eng)

17 June 2008
Scorecard

Lancashire Lightning; 180/6 (20 overs)	v	Durham Dynamos; 181/4 (19 overs)
SG Law 54 (39); SG Borthwick 3-23 [3]		P Mustard 61 (44); KW Hogg 2-31 [4]

Durham won by 6 wickets
Old Trafford Cricket Ground, Manchester, England
Umpires: JW Holder (Eng) and P Willey (Eng)

17 June 2008
Scorecard

Leicestershire Foxes; 154/3 (20 overs)	v	Yorkshire Carnegie; 158/4 (20 overs)
HD Ackerman 57* (51); AU Rashid 2-28 [4]		A McGrath 59 (46); MN Malik 1-17 [4]

Yorkshire won by 6 wickets
Grace Road, Leicester, England
Umpires: NA Mallender (Eng) and G Sharp (Eng)

17 June 2008

Durham Dynamos; Did not bat	v	Nottinghamshire Outlaws; Did not bat

Abandoned

18 June 2008
Scorecard

Lancashire Lightning; 150/6 (20 overs)	v	Yorkshire Carnegie; 154/8 (19.4 overs)
MB Loye 43 (33); RM Pyrah 3-20 [4]		A McGrath 46 (39)

Yorkshire won by 2 wickets
Headingley, Leeds, England
Umpires: NL Bainton (Eng) and JW Holder (Eng)

19 June 2008
Scorecard

Leicestershire Foxes; 149/7 (20 overs)	v	Nottinghamshire Outlaws; 150/5 (19.4 overs)
HD Ackerman 55 (45); SR Patel 2-21 [4]		CL Cairns 50 (38); D du Preez 2-31 [4]

Nottinghamshire won by 5 wickets
Trent Bridge, Nottingham, England
Umpires: B Dudleston (Eng) and JF Steele (Eng)

20 June 2008
Scorecard

Derbyshire Phantoms; 114/8 (20 overs)	v	Nottinghamshire Outlaws; 116/2 (16.3 overs)
DJ Pipe 45 (38); DJ Pattinson 3-18 [4]		AC Voges 45 (35); R Clarke 1-18 [2.3]

Nottinghamshire won by 8 wickets
County Ground, Derby, England
Umpires: GI Burgess (Eng) and JF Steele (Eng)

20 June 2008
Scorecard

Leicestershire Foxes; 119/8 (20 overs)	v	Durham Dynamos; 123/2 (13.3 overs)
PA Nixon 35 (38); GR Breese 3-17 [4]		P Mustard 42 (23); DT Rowe 1-26 [2]

Durham won by 8 wickets
Riverside, Chester-le-Street, England
Umpires: NGC Cowley (Eng) and JW Lloyds (Eng)

20 June 2008
Scorecard

Yorkshire Carnegie; 135/8 (20 overs)	v	Lancashire Lightning; 131/6 (20 overs)
GL Brophy 44 (36); SJ Marshall 3-11 [3]		F du Plessis 42 (38); TT Bresnan 2-12 [4]

Yorkshire won by 4 runs
Old Trafford Cricket Ground, Manchester, England
Umpires: B Dudleston (Eng) and VA Holder (WI)

22 June 2008
Scorecard

Leicestershire Foxes; 118/6 (20 overs)	v	Derbyshire Phantoms; 122/3 (18 overs)
HD Ackerman 49 (44); WW Hinds 2-14 [4]		WW Hinds 42* (46); SJ Cliff 1-24 [4]

Derbyshire won by 7 wickets
County Ground, Derby, England
Umpires: MJ Harris (Eng) and NA Mallender (Eng)

22 June 2008
Scorecard

Nottinghamshire Outlaws; 151/7 (20 overs)	v	Lancashire Lightning; 155/5 (19.3 overs)
AC Voges 51 (42); SJ Marshall 3-27 [4]		F du Plessis 57* (37); AR Adams 2-28 [4]

Lancashire won by 5 wickets
Trent Bridge, Nottingham, England
Umpires: NGC Cowley (Eng) and RT Robinson (Eng)

22 June 2008
Scorecard

Yorkshire Carnegie; 159/7 (20 overs)	v	Durham Dynamos; 159/7 (20 overs)
A McGrath 65 (58); SJ Harmison 4-38 [4]		P Mustard 40 (28); RM Pyrah 4-20 [4]

Match tied
Headingley, Leeds, England
Umpires: B Dudleston (Eng) and AA Jones (Eng)

23 June 2008
Scorecard

Derbyshire Phantoms; 153/5 (20 overs)	v	Lancashire Lightning; 154/1 (16.2 overs)
WW Hinds 72 (52); G Chapple 2-23 [4]		L Vincent 102* (63); WW Hinds 1-36 [4]

Lancashire won by 9 wickets
Old Trafford Cricket Ground, Manchester, England
Umpires: AA Jones (Eng) and SA Garratt (Eng)

24 June 2008
Scorecard

Durham Dynamos; 162/8 (20 overs)	v	Yorkshire Carnegie; 49/5 (10 overs)
P Mustard 49 (37); RM Pyrah 3-32 [4]		JA Rudolph 22* (22); SJ Harmison 2-7 [2]

Durham won by 39 runs (D/L)
Riverside, Chester-le-Street, England
Umpires: MJD Bodenham (Eng) and GI Burgess (Eng) Yorkshire innings reduced to 10 overs due to rain.

24 June 2008
Scorecard

Leicestershire Foxes; 131/6 (20 overs)	v	Nottinghamshire Outlaws; 126 (19.5 overs)
J Allenby 57 (52); CE Shreck 4-22 [4]		AC Voges 59 (50) MN Malik 4-16 [4]

Leicestershire won by 5 runs
Grace Road, Leicester, England
Umpires: JH Evans (Eng) and TE Jesty (Eng)

25 June 2008
Scorecard

Derbyshire Phantoms; 118/6 (18 overs)	v	Durham Dynamos; 124/3 (15.2 overs)
R Clarke 36 (27); GR Breese 2-15 [3]		JA Morkel 54* (34); KJ Dean 2-22 [3]

Durham won by 7 wickets (D/L)
County Ground, Derby, England
Umpires: JH Evans (Eng) and SA Garratt (Eng) Match reduced to 18 overs due to bad light.

25 June 2008
Scorecard

Lancashire Lightning; 155/8 (20 overs)	v	Nottinghamshire Outlaws; 132 (19.1 overs)
L Vincent 56 (36); MA Ealham 3-21 [4]		WI Jefferson 35 (35); F du Plessis 2-16 [3]

Lancashire won by 23 runs
Old Trafford Cricket Ground, Manchester, England
Umpires: MJD Bodenham (Eng) and JW Lloyds (Eng)

27 June 2008

Yorkshire Carnegie; Did not bat	v	Leicestershire Foxes; Did not bat

Abandoned

27 June 2008
Scorecard

Durham Dynamos; 77/7 (10 overs)	v	Lancashire Lightning; 8/2 (1.4 overs)
P Mustard 27 (26); A Flintoff 4-12 [2]		L Vincent 4 (2); LE Plunkett 1-3 [0.4]

No Result
Riverside, Chester-le-Street, England
Umpires: RJ Bailey (Eng) and B Leadbeater (Eng)
Match reduced to 10 overs due to rain and bad light.

27 June 2008
Scorecard

Leicestershire Foxes; 149/5 (20 overs)	v	Derbyshire Phantoms; 126 (19.2 overs)
J Allenby 50 (31); JL Clare 2-20 [4]		FD Telo 33 (26); J Allenby 5-27 [4]

Leicestershire won by 23 runs
Grace Road, Leicester, England
Umpires: NGC Cowley (Eng) and JH Evans (Eng)

27 June 2008
Scorecard

Nottinghamshire Outlaws; 136/8 (20 overs)	v	Yorkshire Carnegie; 137/1 (20 overs)
AC Voges 39 (28); AU Rashid 4-24 [4]		GL Brophy 57* (45); RS Ferley 1-33 [4]

Yorkshire won by 9 wickets
Trent Bridge, Nottingham, England
Umpires: SA Garratt (Eng) and TE Jesty (Eng)

Due to Yorkshire fielding an ineligible player, the match was awarded to Nottinghamshire on 10 July. The result was changed back to a Yorkshire win, but with no points awarded on 14 July.

=== South Division ===
Pos	Team	Pld	W	L	T	NR	Pts	NRR
1	Middlesex Crusaders	10	8	2	0	0	16	0.732
2	Essex Eagles	10	6	3	1	0	13	0.937
3	Kent Spitfires	10	6	4	0	0	12	0.640
4	Hampshire Hawks	10	5	4	1	0	11	−0.505
5	Sussex Sharks	10	2	8	0	0	4	−0.876
6	Surrey Brown Caps	10	2	8	0	0	4	−0.905

==== Results ====
11 June 2008
Scorecard

Middlesex Crusaders; 190/7 (20 overs)	v	Hampshire Hawks; 157/8 (20 overs)
Owais Shah 48 (34); Kevin Pietersen 3/33 (4)		Kevin Pietersen 43 (29); Shaun Udal 3/21 (4)

Middlesex won by 33 runs
The Rose Bowl, Southampton
Umpires: John Holder and Richard Illingworth
Player of the match: Shaun Udal

11 June 2008
Scorecard

Sussex Sharks; 137 (19.5 overs)	v	Kent Spitfires; 140/4 (19.5 overs)
Chris Adams 57 (37); Yasir Arafat 4/17 (3.5)		Joe Denly 50 (57); Dwayne Smith 2/33 (4)

Kent won by 6 wickets
St Lawrence Ground, Canterbury
Umpires: Neil Bainton and Graham Burgess
Player of the match: Azhar Mahmood

11 June 2008
Scorecard

Surrey Brown Caps; 126/9 (20 overs)	v	Essex Eagles; 127/3 (15 overs)
Ali Brown 35 (29); Danish Kaneria 3/22 (4)		Mark Pettini 66 (35); Matthew Spriegel 1/9 (3)

Essex won by 7 wickets
The Oval, London
Umpires: Trevor Jesty and Allan Jones
Player of the match: Mark Pettini

12 June 2008
Scorecard

Essex Eagles; 115/9 (20 overs)	v	Middlesex Crusaders; 116/3 (16.5 overs)
Neil Dexter 46 (40); Tim Murtagh 3/24 (4)		Eoin Morgan 47 (36); Graham Napier 1/17 (3)

Middlesex won by 7 wickets
Lord's, London
Umpires: Trevor Jesty and Graham Burgess
Player of the match: Tim Murtagh

13 June 2008
Scorecard

Kent Spitfires; 181/5 (20 overs)	v	Surrey Brown Caps; 168/7 (20 overs)
JL Denly 52 (33); A Razzaq 2-32 [4]		SA Newman 48 (31); R McLaren 3-28 [4]

Kent won by 13 runs
The Oval, London, England
Umpires: GI Burgess (Eng) and P Willey (Eng)

13 June 2008
Scorecard

Sussex Sharks; 204/6 (20 overs)	v	Hampshire Hawks; 205/4 (20 overs)
DR Smith 72* (27); M Hayward 2-29 [3]		MA Carberry 58 (29); RJ Hamilton-Brown 2-17 [3]

Hampshire won by 6 wickets
County Cricket Ground, Hove, England
Umpires: SA Garratt (Eng) and AA Jones (Eng)

14 June 2008
Scorecard

Hampshire Hawks; 197/6 (20 overs)	v	Kent Spitfires; 153/7 (20 overs)
MA Carberry 57 (42); Y Arafat 4-38 [4]		JL Denly 63 (51); GA Lamb 2-25 [4]

Hampshire won by 44 runs
The Rose Bowl, Southampton, England
Umpires: RJ Bailey (Eng) and B Dudleston (Eng)

15 June 2008
Scorecard

Essex Eagles; 132 (20 overs)	v	Middlesex Crusaders; 133/3 (16.1 overs)
JS Foster 50* (42); DP Nannes 4-28 [4]		T Henderson 64* (30); RN ten Doeschate 1-14 [3]

Middlesex won by 7 wickets
County Ground, Chelmsford, England
Umpires: SA Garratt (Eng) and G Sharp (Eng)

15 June 2008
Scorecard

Sussex Sharks; 141/5 (20 overs)	v	Surrey Brown Caps; 142/5 (18 overs)
CD Nash 52 (41); MNW Spriegel 2-16 [4]		A Razzaq 39* (20); DR Smith 3-14 [4]

Surrey won by 5 wickets
The Oval, London, England
Umpires: TE Jesty (Eng) and NGB Cook (Eng)

16 June 2008
Scorecard

Hampshire Hawks; 162/7 (20 overs)	v	Kent Spitfires; 166/6 (20 overs)
MA Carberry 51 (39); SJ Cook 2-21 [4]		JL Denly 50 (46); LA Dawson 1-14 [2]

Kent won by 4 wickets
St Lawrence Ground, Canterbury, England
Umpires: NGB Cook (Eng) and JH Evans (Eng)

16 June 2008
Scorecard

Surrey Brown Caps; 141/7 (20 overs)	v	Middlesex Crusaders; 144/5 (19 overs)
JGE Benning 50* (53); DP Nannes 2-14 [4]		EC Joyce 47 (48); A Razzaq 3-30 [4]

Middlesex won by 5 wickets
Lord's, London, England
Umpires: VA Holder (WI) and NA Mallender (Eng)

17 June 2008
Scorecard

Sussex Sharks; 144 (20 overs)	v	Essex Eagles; 146/3 (20 overs)
MW Goodwin 47 (44); D Kaneria 2-18 [4]		JS Foster 41* (25); RJ Kirtley 1-33 [3]

Essex won by 6 wickets
County Cricket Ground, Hove, England
Umpires: NGC Cowley (Eng) and MJ Harris (Eng)

18 June 2008
Scorecard

Essex Eagles; 147/5 (20 overs)	v	Kent Spitfires; 146/8 (20 overs)
JER Gallian 44 (30); JC Tredwell 2-25 [4]		M van Jaarsveld 32 (27); GW Flower 3-21 [2]

Essex won by 1 run
County Ground, Chelmsford, England
Umpires: NA Mallender (Eng) and G Sharp (Eng)

18 June 2008
Scorecard

Surrey Brown Caps; 175/6 (20 overs)	v	Hampshire Hawks; 177/6 (19 overs)
A Razzaq 65 (34); IJ Harvey 2-20 [4]		SM Ervine 46 (28); S Mushtaq 3-24 [4]

Hampshire won by 4 wickets
The Oval, London, England
Umpires: MJ Harris (Eng) and B Leadbeater (Eng)

19 June 2008
Scorecard

Middlesex Crusaders; 177/7 (20 overs)	v	Sussex Sharks; 139/9 (20 overs)
BA Godleman 58 (34); MH Yardy 3-24 [4]		MW Goodwin 52 (45); DP Nannes 3-19 [4]

Middlesex won by 38 runs
Lord's, London, England
Umpires: JH Evans (Eng) and B Leadbeater (Eng)

20 June 2008
Scorecard

Essex Eagles; 164/9 (20 overs)	v	Surrey Brown Caps; 94 (17 overs)
JS Foster 41 (23); S Mushtaq 3-40 [4]		AD Brown 22 (19); RN ten Doeschate 4-24 [4]

Essex won by 70 runs
County Ground, Chelmsford, England
Umpires: JH Evans (Eng) and RK Illingworth (Eng)

20 June 2008
Scorecard

Hampshire Hawks; 85 (18.2 overs)	v	Sussex Sharks; 87/1 (9.3 overs)
MJ Lumb 32 (24); CJ Liddle 4-15 [3.2]		MW Goodwin 46* (26); H Riazuddin 1-26 [2]

Sussex won by 9 wickets
The Rose Bowl, Southampton, England
Umpires: TE Jesty (Eng) and B Leadbeater (Eng)

20 June 2008
Scorecard

Kent Spitfires; 86/7 (8 overs)	v	Middlesex Crusaders; 61/7 (8 overs)
JM Kemp 28 (10); ST Finn 2-6 [1]		DJ Malan 25 (19); JC Tredwell 3-9 [2]

Kent won by 25 runs
County Cricket Ground, Beckenham, England
Umpires: MJD Bodenham (Eng) and MJ Harris (Eng)
Match reduced to 8 overs a team.

22 June 2008
Scorecard

Kent Spitfires; 204/5 (20 overs)	v	Essex Eagles; 123 (18.5 overs)
JL Denly 91 (57); D Kaneria 2-30 [4]		RN ten Doeschate 22 (15); JC Tredwell 3-17 [4]

Kent won by 81 runs
County Cricket Ground, Beckenham, England
Umpires: RK Illingworth (Eng) and B Leadbeater (Eng)

22 June 2008
Scorecard

Hampshire Hawks; 133/8 (20 overs)	v	Middlesex Crusaders; 127/7 (20 overs)
MA Carberry 37 (42); TJ Murtagh 3-15 [4]		SD Udal 40* (24); AD Mascarenhas 3-12 [4]

Hampshire won by 6 runs
Old Deer Park, Richmond, England
Umpires: TE Jesty (Eng) and JW Lloyds (Eng)

22 June 2008
Scorecard

Surrey Brown Caps; 164/8 (20 overs)	v	Sussex Sharks; 165/4 (17.2 overs)
AD Brown 51 (21); CJ Liddle 2-31 [4]		MW Goodwin 79* (46); JW Dernbach 3-32 [4]

Sussex won by 6 wickets
County Cricket Ground, Hove, England
Umpires: NL Bainton (Eng) and VA Holder (WI)

23 June 2008
Scorecard

Surrey Brown Caps; 147/7 (20 overs)	v	Hampshire Hawks; 151/4 (18.1 overs)
SA Newman 52 (52); BV Taylor 2-18 [3]		MJ Lumb 63 (45); A Razzaq 1-25 [3]

Hampshire won by 6 wickets
The Rose Bowl, Southampton, England
Umpires: PJ Hartley (Eng) and RA Kettleborough (Eng)

24 June 2008
Scorecard

Essex Eagles; 242/3 (20 overs)	v	Sussex Sharks; 114 (16.4 overs)
GR Napier 152* (58); RSC Martin-Jenkins 1-17 [4]		MW Goodwin 23 (17); JD Middlebrook 3-13 [3]

Essex won by 128 runs
County Ground, Chelmsford, England
Umpires: B Dudleston (Eng) and NJ Llong (Eng)

24 June 2008
Scorecard

Middlesex Crusaders; 171/7 (20 overs)	v	Kent Spitfires; 165/8 (20 overs)
EJG Morgan 62 (43); A Mahmood 3-27 [4]		RWT Key 49 (38); T Henderson 4-29 [4]

Middlesex won by 6 runs
Gatting Way, Uxbridge, England
Umpires: JF Steele (Eng) and B Leadbeater (Eng)

25 June 2008
Scorecard

Hampshire Hawks; 164/6 (20 overs)	v	Essex Eagles; 164/8 (20 overs)
MA Carberry 51 (42); GA Napier 2-35 [4]		JER Gallian 55 (42); CT Tremlett 2-27 [4]

Match tied
The Rose Bowl, Southampton, England
Umpires: AA Jones (Eng) and VA Holder (WI)

25 June 2008
Scorecard

Surrey Brown Caps; 166/7 (20 overs)	v	Kent Spitfires; 160/9 (20 overs)
A Razzaq 39 (33); R McLaren 2-26 [4]		A Mahmood 55 (31); A Razzaq 4-17 [4]

Surrey won by 6 runs
St Lawrence Ground, Canterbury, England
Umpires: RT Robinson (Eng) and JF Steele (Eng)

25 June 2008
Scorecard

Sussex Sharks; 151/7 (20 overs)	v	Middlesex Crusaders; 153/4 (19 overs)
MH Yardy 43 (41); ST Finn 3-22 [4]		BA Godleman 69 (49); WAT Beer 2-32 [4]

Middlesex won by 6 wickets
County Cricket Ground, Hove, England
Umpires: NGC Cowley (Eng) and RK Illingworth (Eng)

27 June 2008
Scorecard

Essex Eagles; 159 (19.4 overs)	v	Hampshire Hawks; 105 (17.3 overs)
ML Pettini 49 (34); CT Tremlett 4-25 [3.4]		N Pothas 17 (12); D Kaneria 4-22 [3.3]

Essex won by 54 runs
County Ground, Chelmsford, England
Umpires: NA Mallender (Eng) and GI Burgess (Eng)

27 June 2008
Scorecard

Surrey Brown Caps; 139/8 (20 overs)	v	Middlesex Crusaders; 140/3 (18.3 overs)
JN Batty 42* (36); T Henderson 3-22 [4]		EJG Morgan 36* (28); A Razzaq 1-20 [3]

Middlesex won by 7 wickets
The Oval, London, England
Umpires: RT Robinson (Eng) and AA Jones (Eng)

27 June 2008
Scorecard

Kent Spitfires; 162/9 (20 overs)	v	Sussex Sharks; 112 (17 overs)
Y Arafat 42 (23); CJ Liddle 4-28 [4]		RJ Hamilton-Brown 36 (32); Y Arafat 3-12 [2]

Kent won by 50 runs
County Cricket Ground, Hove, England
Umpires: G Sharp (Eng) and VA Holder (WI)

== Knockout stage ==
Quarterfinals
M1	Warwickshire Bears	133/8
S3	Kent Spitfires	175/6
S2	Essex Eagles	192/9
M2	Northants Steelbacks	115/7
S1	Middlesex Crusaders	176/7
N2	Lancashire Lightning	164/8
N1	Durham Dynamos	163/8
M3	Glamorgan Dragons	119

Semifinals
S3	Kent Spitfires	173/7
S2	Essex Eagles	159/8
S1	Middlesex Crusaders	141/2
N1	Durham Dynamos	138/6

Final
S3	Kent Spitfires	184/5
S1	Middlesex Crusaders	187/6

Note: The draw for the semi-finals occurred after the quarter-finals.

=== Quarter-finals ===
7 July 2008
Scorecard

Yorkshire Carnegie	v	Durham Dynamos

Match cancelled without a ball bowled
Riverside Ground, Chester-le-Street
Umpires: Neil Mallender and Tim Robinson

The match at the Riverside was postponed in bizarre circumstances. The ECB received allegations about Yorkshire fielding an ineligible player in their final group game, against the Nottinghamshire Outlaws.

In an original meeting on 10 July, Yorkshire were summoned to Old Trafford and were told that they were to be ejected from the tournament, with Nottinghamshire to be reinstated in the draw. However, Yorkshire appealed and at a second meeting held on 14 July, their appeal was heard and rejected, but this time Glamorgan were placed into the draw on a superior run rate, because Nottinghamshire were not awarded the points for the 27 June game.

7 July 2008
Scorecard

Essex Eagles; 192/9 (20 overs)	v	Northamptonshire Steelbacks; 115/7 (18 overs)
RS Bopara 47 (26); N Boje 2-29 [4]		N Boje 58* (43); GR Napier 4-10 [4]

Essex won by 59 runs (D/L)
County Ground, Chelmsford
Umpires: RK Illingworth (Eng) and NJ Llong (Eng)
Player of the match: GR Napier

8 July 2008
Scorecard

Middlesex Crusaders; 176/7 (20 overs)	v	Lancashire Lightning; 164/8 (20 overs)
DJ Malan 103 (54); A Flintoff 3-17 [4]		A Flintoff 53 (41); TJ Murtagh 3-35 [4]

Middlesex won by 12 runs
The Oval, London
Umpires: RK Illingworth (Eng) and B Dudleston (Eng)
Player of the match: DJ Malan

9,10 July 2008
Scorecard

Kent Spitfires; 175/6 (20 overs)	v	Warwickshire Bears; 133/8 (20 overs)
DI Stevens 69 (32); DL Maddy 1-7 [0.3]		AG Botha 35 (19); Y Arafat 3-29 [4]

Kent won by 42 runs
Edgbaston, Birmingham
Umpires: RJ Bailey (Eng) and JW Lloyds (Eng)
Player of the match: DI Stevens

- Reserve day used.

22 July 2008
Scorecard

Durham Dynamos; 163/8 (20 overs)	v	Glamorgan Dragons; 119 (17.4 overs)
WR Smith 51 (38); JAR Harris 3-41 [4]		JWM Dalrymple 32 (36); LE Plunkett 3-16 [3]

Durham won by 44 runs
Riverside, Chester-le-Street
Umpires: JW Holder (Eng) and RT Robinson (Eng)

Having waited fifteen days to play their quarter-final, Durham progressed to Finals Day after a 44-run win at the Riverside. Having been put into bat, the visitors took three early wickets, removing dangermen Phil Mustard, Shivnarine Chanderpaul and Paul Collingwood, with the score only on 26. After Michael Di Venuto fell, Durham looked to be in some trouble. However, a fifth wicket partnership of 53 between Will Smith and captain Dale Benkenstein pushed the score up. Smith made 51 as Durham set a target of 164, for Glamorgan to chase. It could have been somewhat lower had it not been for virtuoso innings by Gareth Breese, smashing 20 off just 9 balls, and Liam Plunkett who hit 12* off 3. James Harris took 3 wickets, but accounted for around a quarter of the runs conceded.

The Glamorgan reply could not have gotten off to a worse start, losing opener Richard Grant very first ball. David Hemp soon followed, becoming Plunkett's second victim, with only seven runs on the board. Glamorgan were always struggling with the run-rate, with most of the top-order recording strike rates of below 100. Only four players made it to double figures, with Jamie Dalrymple top scoring with 32, and had stern support from wicket-keeper Mark Wallace, who fired 26 off sixteen deliveries. However, Glamorgan fell a long way short with Plunkett, the pick of the Durham attack, taking 3-16 off three overs.

=== Finals Day ===
Semi-finals

26 July 2008
Scorecard

Kent Spitfires; 173/7 (20 overs)	v	Essex Eagles; 159/8 (20 overs)
Joe Denly 36 (27); Ravinder Bopara 3/36 (4)		Mark Pettini 54 (47); Yasir Arafat 2/22 (4)

Kent won by 14 runs
The Rose Bowl, Southampton
Umpires: Rob Bailey and Jeremy Lloyds
Player of the match: Azhar Mahmood

26 July 2008
Scorecard

Durham Dynamos; 138/6 (20 overs)	v	Middlesex Crusaders; 141/2 (15.4 overs)
Shivnarine Chanderpaul 48 (47); Tim Murtagh 3/29 (4)		Tyron Henderson 59* (21); Gareth Breese 1/14 (2)

Middlesex won by 8 wickets
The Rose Bowl, Southampton
Umpires: Richard Illingworth and Neil Mallender
Player of the match: Tyron Henderson

Final

26 July 2008
Scorecard

Middlesex Crusaders; 187/6 (20 overs)	v	Kent Spitfires; 184/5 (20 overs)
Owais Shah 75 (35); Yasir Arafat 2/20 (4)		Rob Key 52 (30); Shaun Udal 1/21 (4)

Middlesex won by 3 runs
The Rose Bowl, Southampton
Umpires: Neil Mallender and Jeremy Lloyds
Player of the match: Owais Shah

== Statistics ==
=== Runs ===
Player	Team	Matches	Inns	NO	Runs	Balls	HS	S/Rate	100s	50s	Average
Joe Denly	Kent Spitfires	13	13	0	451	379	91	118.99	0	5	34.69
Anthony McGrath	Yorkshire Carnegie	9	9	2	392	296	72*	132.43	0	4	56.00
Murray Goodwin	Sussex Sharks	10	10	2	345	273	79*	126.37	0	3	43.13
Rob Key	Kent Spitfires	13	13	0	345	258	52	133.72	0	1	26.53
Michael Carberry	Hampshire Hawks	10	10	1	334	268	58	124.62	0	4	37.11
Graham Napier	Essex Eagles	12	11	1	326	167	152*	195.20	1	0	32.60
Michael Lumb	Hampshire Hawks	10	10	0	315	209	63	150.71	0	2	31.50
Marcus Trescothick	Somerset Sabres	8	8	0	306	185	107	165.40	1	1	38.25
Dawid Malan	Middlesex Crusaders	12	10	5	306	220	103	139.09	1	1	61.20
Phil Mustard	Durham Dynamos	11	11	0	303	224	61	135.26	0	1	27.54

=== Wickets ===
Player	Team	Matches	Overs	Runs	Wickets	Best	Econ	S/Rate	4/inns	5+/inns	Average
Yasir Arafat	Kent Spitfires	13	44	341	23	4/17	7.75	11.48	2	0	14.82
Tyron Henderson	Middlesex Crusaders	12	47	349	21	4/29	7.42	13.43	1	0	16.61
Andrew Hall	Northamptonshire Steelbacks	9	34.1	271	20	6/21	7.93	10.25	0	2	13.55
Danish Kaneria	Essex Eagles	12	45.1	276	20	4/22	6.11	13.55	1	0	13.80
Tim Murtagh	Middlesex Crusaders	13	50	400	20	3/15	8.00	15.00	0	0	20.00
Johann Louw	Northamptonshire Steelbacks	11	39	325	17	3/18	8.33	13.76	0	0	19.12
James Tredwell	Kent Spitfires	13	41	264	16	3/9	6.43	15.38	0	0	16.50
Graham Napier	Essex Eagles	12	40.1	282	16	4/10	7.02	15.06	1	0	17.62
Ian Salisbury	Warwickshire Bears	10	32	175	15	3/14	5.47	12.80	0	0	11.67
Abdul Razzaq	Surrey Brown Caps	9	32	232	15	4/17	7.25	12.80	1	0	15.47

== See also ==
- 2008 English cricket season
