= Roy Wills =

English cricketer

Personal information
- Full name: Roy Wills
- Born: 5 December 1944 (age 81); Abington, Northamptonshire, England
- Batting: Left-handed
- Role: Occasional wicket-keeper
- Relatives: Rob Bailey (son-in-law)

Domestic team information
- Years: Team
- 1963–1973: Northamptonshire

Career statistics
Competition	First-class	List A
Matches	33	1
Runs scored	824	11
Batting average	17.16	11.00
100s/50s	1/2	0/0
Top score	151*	11
Catches/stumpings	26/0	0/–
- Source: Cricinfo, 17 December 2011

Roy Wills (born 5 December 1944) is a former English cricketer. Wills was a right-handed batsman who occasionally fielded as a wicket-keeper. He was educated at Abington, Northamptonshire.

Wills made his first-class debut for Northamptonshire against Oxford University in 1963. He made 32 further first-class appearances for the county, the last of which came against Kent in the 1969 County Championship. In his 33 first-class appearances, he scored a total of 824 runs an average of 17.16, with a high score of 151 not out. This score was his only century and came against Cambridge University in 1966. Although the 1969 season marked his final first-class appearance, he did later make a single List A appearance for Northamptonshire against Warwickshire in the 1973 Benson & Hedges Cup, scoring 11 runs before being dismissed by David Brown.

His son-in-law Rob Bailey played first-class cricket and Test cricket for England.
