= David Burton (cricketer, born 1985) =

English cricketer (born 1985)

Personal information
- Full name: David Alexander Burton
- Born: 23 August 1985 (age 41); Stockwell, London, England
- Batting: Right-handed
- Bowling: Right-arm medium-fast
- Role: Bowler

Domestic team information
- Years: Team
- 2006: Gloucestershire
- 2008–2009: Middlesex
- 2010–2012: Northamptonshire

Career statistics
Competition	FC	LA	T20
Matches	7	10	5
Runs scored	77	14	–
Batting average	11.00	7.00	–
100s/50s	0/1	0/0	–
Top score	52*	5*	–
Balls bowled	956	247	72
Wickets	17	6	4
Bowling average	43.76	38.50	18.75
5 wickets in innings	2	0	0
10 wickets in match	0	0	0
Best bowling	5/68	3/25	2/13
Catches/stumpings	1/–	5/–	1/–
- Source: ESPNcricinfo, 25 December 2012

David Alexander Burton (born 23 August 1985) is a first-class cricketer, who has played county cricket for Gloucestershire, Middlesex and Northamptonshire.

== Career ==
Burton became a county cricketer after representing four different counties in Second Eleven or friendly matches in 2005 and 2006 (Surrey, Sussex, Essex and Gloucestershire). Whilst at Gloucestershire, he played two Second Eleven matches in the latter part of 2006, taking 5–66 against Derbyshire and 5-76 and 3–60 against Glamorgan and was rewarded by being selected for the First XI in Gloucestershire's last County Championship match of the season against Glamorgan. Coming in at no.10 with the score on 384–8, he scored 52* in a 128-run partnership with Mark Hardinges, Gloucestershire's highest-ever ninth-wicket stand against Glamorgan. He performed poorly in the remainder of the match, bowling 20 wicketless overs for 129 including three wides and fifteen no-balls and was out for 1 in the second innings.

In 2007, Burton played five Second Eleven Championship matches and four Second Eleven Trophy matches for Gloucestershire but could not break into the first team and was released at the end of the season.

At the start of the 2008 season, he played three pre-season matches for Kent and another four for Middlesex, and was eventually signed up by the latter. He became a regular in the second XI, playing 11 Championship matches and 4 Trophy matches, and due to injuries to other bowlers got into the first XI for two Twenty20 Cup group stage matches in what turned out to be a competition that Middlesex won. He also played in a first-class match against the touring South Africans. However, he made no further 1st team appearances and was not initially retained for the following season.

2009 saw Burton play one pre-season match for Kent and one Second Eleven Championship match for Leicestershire. Middlesex asked him to return after they suffered another injury crisis to their bowlers, and as well as playing two Second Eleven Championship matches and taking part in a match against Cardiff UCCE he was selected for a County Championship match against his old team Gloucestershire, and in a Twenty20 match against Sussex. Against Gloucestershire, in what was otherwise a difficult match for the Middlesex players, Burton took 5-68, and against Sussex he took 2-13 off four overs making him Middlesex's top wicket-taker in the match as well as their most economical bowler. These two performances earned him a contract for the remainder of the season.

He signed and made his debut for Northamptonshire on 16 September 2010 against Leicestershire and took five wickets for 75 from 20 overs in the first innings.

== Career best performances ==
Updated 25 December 2012

	Batting				Bowling			
	Score	Fixture	Venue	Season	Figures	Fixture	Venue	Season
FC	52*	Gloucestershire v Glamorgan	Cardiff	2006	5/68	Middlesex v Gloucestershire	Bristol	2009
LA	5*	Northamptonshire Steelbacks v Derbyshire Falcons	Derby	2012	3/25	Northamptonshire Steelbacks v Warwickshire Bears	Birmingham	2011
T20	-				2/13	Middlesex Panthers v Surrey Brown Caps	Lord's	2009
