= Simon Marshall (cricketer) =

English cricketer (born 1982)

Personal information
- Full name: Simon James Marshall
- Born: 20 September 1982 (age 44); Birkenhead, Merseyside, England
- Nickname: Marsh
- Height: 6 ft 3 in (1.91 m)
- Batting: Right-handed
- Bowling: Right-arm leg break

Domestic team information
- Years: Team
- 2005–2008: Lancashire (squad no. 17)
- 2002–2004: Cambridge UCCE

Career statistics
Competition	FC	LA	T20
Matches	21	26	17
Runs scored	809	63	98
Batting average	33.70	5.25	19.60
100s/50s	1/3	0/0	0/0
Top score	126*	22	47
Balls bowled	4,004	1,011	184
Wickets	33	17	26
Bowling average	67.09	46.00	14.46
5 wickets in innings	1	0	0
10 wickets in match	0	0	0
Best bowling	6/128	3/36	4/20
Catches/stumpings	6/–	7/–	5/–
- Source: CricketArchive.com, 12 August 2008

Simon James Marshall (born 20 September 1982) is an English cricketer who was released by Lancashire County Cricket Club in 2008. He bats right-handed and bowls right arm leg breaks. He was educated at Birkenhead School and Pembroke College, Cambridge, where he read Land Economy from 2001 to 2004.

Marshall has also represented Cambridge University Centre of Cricketing Excellence and made his Lancashire debut in 2005, but he made his big breakthrough in 2006. Marshall attended Birkenhead School. After four seasons with Lancashire, Marshall left at the end of the 2008 season when the club decided not to renew his contract. During his time at Lancashire, Marshall appeared in 9 first-class matches taking 15 wickets at 45.60. In 2008, Marshall played in only two first-class and four list A matches, but in his nine Twenty20 appearances for Lancashire he took 14 wickets at an average of 13.57.
