= Kyle Hodnett =

Former South African-born English cricketer

Personal information
- Full name: Kyle David Hodnett
- Born: 4 December 1986 (age 39); Durban, Natal, South Africa
- Nickname: Hodders
- Height: 5 ft 11 in (1.80 m)
- Batting: Left-handed
- Bowling: Right-arm fast-medium
- Role: Bowler
- Relatives: Grant Hodnett (brother)

Domestic team information
- Years: Team
- 2008: Marylebone Cricket Club
- 2010: Berkshire
- 2011/12–2012/13: KwaZulu-Natal
- LA debut: 1 August 2008 MCC v Bangladesh A
- FC debut: 8 March 2012 KwaZulu-Natal v Free State

Career statistics
Competition	FC	LA	T20
Matches	7	1	3
Runs scored	75	6	–
Batting average	15.00	6.00	–
100s/50s	0/0	0/0	–
Top score	25	6	–
Balls bowled	954	60	54
Wickets	12	1	1
Bowling average	42.08	43.00	68.00
5 wickets in innings	0	0	0
10 wickets in match	0	0	0
Best bowling	2/59	1/43	1/31
Catches/stumpings	3/–	0/–	1/–
- Source: ESPNcricinfo, 3 October 2014

Kyle David Hodnett (born 4 December 1986) is a former South African born English cricketer. Hodnett was a left-handed batsman who bowled right-arm fast-medium. He was born in Durban, Natal.

After impressing at the programme's winter trials in 2004 , Hodnett was part of the MCC Young Cricketers from 2005 to 2008, and made his List A debut for the Marylebone Cricket Club in 2008 against Bangladesh A at The Racecourse, Durham. In this match, Hodnett took the wicket of Naeem Islam in the Bangladesh A first-innings, conceding in the process 43 runs from 10 overs. With the bat, he scored 6 runs before being dismissed by Dolar Mahmud. Bangladesh A won the match by 80 runs. He took a Second XI Championship hat-trick against Northamptonshire II at Brunton Memorial Ground, Radlett in 2008, becoming the first MCC Young Cricketer to take a hat-trick in the Second XI Championship. Hodnett was included in Nottinghamshire's 2009 preseason plans but did not feature during the regular season due to injury.

In 2010, he made four Minor Counties Championship appearances for Berkshire against Wales Minor Counties, Cheshire, Shropshire and Cornwall.

He returned to his native South Africa where he made his First-Class debut for KwaZulu-Natal against Free State in the CSA Provincial Three-Day Competition 2011/12. During the 2012/13 season, he made his Twenty20 debut for KwaZulu-Natal against Griqualand West at Kingsmead Cricket Ground.
