= Sam Cliff =

English cricketer

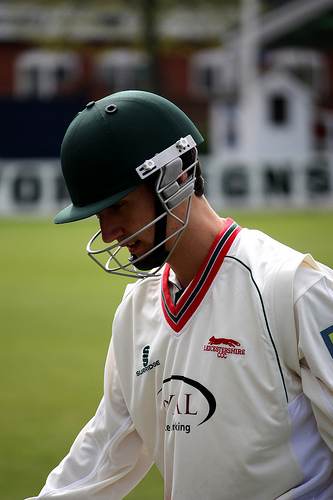
- Sam Cliff in April 2009

Personal information
- Full name: Samuel James Cliff
- Born: 3 October 1987 (age 39); Nottingham, England

Domestic team information
- Years: Team
- 2007–2011: Leicestershire
- 2011: Berkshire

Career statistics
Competition	FC	LA	T20
Matches	8	10	6
Runs scored	71	10	5
Batting average	14.20	5.00	5.00
100s/50s	0/0	0/0	0/0
Top score	26	9	4
Balls bowled	980	432	108
Wickets	16	10	2
Bowling average	35.56	37.90	69.50
5 wickets in innings	0	0/0	0
10 wickets in match	0	0	0
Best bowling	4/42	4/26	1/24
Catches/stumpings	1/0	1	2
- Source: CricketArchive (subscription required), 3 December 2017

Sam Cliff (born 3 October 1987) is an English cricketer who played at First-class, List A and Twenty20 level for Leicestershire between 2007 and 2011.

He made his first-class debut in 2007, in a game against Oxford University, which his team won by an innings margin. He took one wicket in the first innings, that of former Nottinghamshire CB player Peter Wilshaw.
