= Abhishek Raut =

Indian cricketer (born 1987)

Personal information
- Full name: Abhishek Santosh Raut
- Born: 3 March 1987 (age 39); Jajpur Road, Odisha, India
- Batting: Right-handed
- Bowling: Legbreak googly
- Role: Batsman

Domestic team information
- Years: Team
- 2005–2006: Maharashtra
- 2008–2016: Mumbai
- 2009–2011: Rajasthan Royals
- 2011–2012: Goa
- 2017–present: Odisha

Career statistics
Competition	FC	LA
Matches	20	15
Runs scored	771	197
Batting average	28.55	17.90
100s/50s	1/4	0/0
Top score	116*	35
Balls bowled	793
Wickets	15
Bowling average	35.13
5 wickets in innings	-
10 wickets in match	-
Best bowling	3/47	0/0
Catches/stumpings	10/0	15/0
- Source: ESPNcricinfo, 12 December 2021

Abhishek Santosh Raut (born 3 March 1987) is an Indian cricketer. Raut made his debut in first-class cricket on 17–20 Dec 2005. He is an aggressive right-handed batsman and a right-arm leg-break bowler. He was signed by the Rajasthan Royals in the Indian Premier League. In the 2008 IPL season, he made his debut in IPL, scoring 21 runs in 13 balls.

== Career ==
Raut did not play in any matches of the IPL Season 1.

In season two, he played 9 matches, scoring 78 runs at an average of 19.5 runs per innings. His top score was 36 against Deccan Chargers, a match winning performance. He hit 5 fours and 3 sixes in the whole season.

In season three, Raut played 6 matches, scoring 56 runs with the average of 28. His top score was 31. He hit 3 fours and 3 sixes in the whole season.
