= Grant Hodnett =

South African-born English cricketer

Personal information
- Full name: Grant Phillip Hodnett
- Born: 17 August 1982 (age 44); Johannesburg, Transvaal Province, South Africa
- Nickname: Hodders, Hoddie
- Height: 6 ft 4 in (1.93 m)
- Batting: Right-handed
- Bowling: Right-arm leg spin
- Role: Opening batsman
- Relatives: Kyle Hodnett (brother)

Domestic team information
- Years: Team
- 2010/2011-2012/2013: KwaZulu-Natal
- 2002: Gloucestershire Cricket Board
- 2005–2009: Gloucestershire

Career statistics
Competition	FC	LA	T20
Matches	26	13	4
Runs scored	1,339	368	133
Batting average	30.43	33.45	33.25
100s/50s	2/9	0/2	0/1
Top score	168	72*	60
Balls bowled	237	–	–
Wickets	6	–	–
Bowling average	41.33	–	–
5 wickets in innings	0	–	–
10 wickets in match	0	–	–
Best bowling	2/21	–	–
Catches/stumpings	20/–	7/–	2/–
- Source: , 12 September 2013

Grant Phillip Hodnett (born 17 August 1982) is a South African-born English cricketer, who holds a British passport from birth and qualified to play for England through residency. Hodnett is a right-handed batsman who bowls leg break. He was born in Johannesburg, Transvaal Province and educated at Northwood High School in Durban.

== Cricket career ==
Hodnett appeared for the Gloucestershire Cricket Board in the 2002 MCCA Knockout Trophy, after impressing for Cheltenham Cricket Club, he was signed by Gloucestershire for the 2005 season. He made his debut in a first-class match against Warwickshire in the 2005 County Championship. The following season he made his List A debut against Sussex in the 2006 Cheltenham & Gloucester Trophy, while the 2007 season saw Hodnett gain an extended run in Jon Lewis' County Championship team, making fifteen appearances in that season, Hodnett scored 886 first-class runs in this season, which came at an average of 36.91, with a high score of 168. He also made his last three List A appearances for Gloucestershire in the 2007 season during the Friends Provident Trophy. He scored 114 runs in his four List A matches for the county, which came at an average of 28.50, while he made a single half century with a score of exactly 50 against Somerset.

However, in 2008 Hodnett lost his place in the Gloucestershire side, after which he admitted he was suffering from severe depression. He sought treatment for the condition from sports psychologist Brian Copley (who had also helped Marcus Trescothick through his depression). He returned for the 2009 season having missed much of the previous season and made his Twenty20 debut against Worcestershire in the Twenty20 Cup. He made three further matches in the competition, in his final appearance against Northamptonshire, Hodnett scored 60 runs from 46 balls.

Back in his native South Africa, Hodnett made two List A appearances in October 2010 for KwaZulu-Natal against North West and South Western Districts in the CSA Provincial One-Day Competition.

== Criminal convictions ==
In September 2020 at Warrington Magistrates' Court, Hodnett was sentenced to 24 weeks in prison suspended for two years and was ordered to complete a two-year community service order, having been found guilty of a charge of stalking involving serious alarm or distress against a former girlfriend. The court also approved a restraining order preventing Hodnett from contacting the defendant and ordered him to pay court costs.

On 22 February 2024, Hodnett was sentenced to 18 months in jail for violating a restraining order and stalking.

He was released 9 months into his 18 month sentence and re-arrested in November 2024 after breaching strict "licence conditions which required him to disclose any developing relationships."
