= Rob Bailey (cricketer) =

English cricketer and umpire

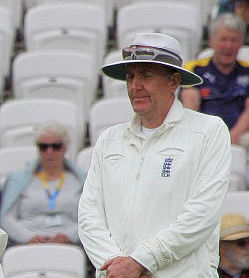
- Bailey standing in a county cricket match in June 2021

Personal information
- Full name: Robert John Bailey
- Born: 28 October 1963 (age 63); Biddulph, Stoke-on-Trent, England
- Height: 6 ft 3 in (1.91 m)
- Batting: Right-handed
- Bowling: Right arm off spin
- Relatives: Roy Wills (father-in-law)

International information
- National side: England
- Test debut (cap 531): 4 August 1988 v West Indies
- Last Test: 16 April 1990 v West Indies
- ODI debut (cap 83): 26 March 1985 v Pakistan
- Last ODI: 15 March 1990 v West Indies

Domestic team information
- Years: Team
- 1982–1999: Northamptonshire
- 2000–2001: Derbyshire

Umpiring information
- ODIs umpired: 24 (2011–2021)
- T20Is umpired: 18 (2011–2018)
- WODIs umpired: 7 (2004–2013)
- WT20Is umpired: 7 (2007–2022)

Career statistics
Competition	Tests	ODI	FC	LA
Matches	4	4	374	396
Runs scored	119	137	21,844	12,076
Batting average	14.87	68.50	40.52	38.82
100s/50s	0/0	0/0	47/111	10/79
Top score	43	43*	224*	153*
Balls bowled	0	36	9,713	3,092
Wickets	–	0	121	72
Bowling average	–	–	42.51	35.61
5 wickets in innings	–	–	2	1
10 wickets in match	–	–	0	0
Best bowling	–	–	5/54	5/45
Catches/stumpings	0/–	1/–	272/–	111/–
- Source: ESPNcricinfo, 1 July 2021

Robert John Bailey (born 28 October 1963) is an English cricket umpire and former player who represented his country in four Tests and four One Day Internationals from 1985 to 1990.

== Playing career ==
Bailey made his first-class debut for Northamptonshire in 1982 before being selected to represent England. He played his first one-day international in Sharjah in 1985, and was called up for a Test debut as part of an inexperienced batting line up against the formidable West Indies attack of 1988. He did well enough in the match at the Oval - making what remained his highest Test score in his first innings - and a subsequent one-day international against Sri Lanka to win selection for the winter tour to India. This trip was however cancelled due to political reasons, as he and several members of the England squad had sporting links to apartheid South Africa. His form at the beginning of the 1989 season can only be considered as poor, returning in time for his selection to the 1989–90 West Indies tour. He had in the intervening period specifically passed up the opportunity to participate in the England 1989 Rebel Tour to South Africa, which led to the non-availability of a number of other batters. He was given his first game of the series against the West Indies in the third Test where he bagged a pair. After a shocking decision in the fourth Test, perhaps in part caused by pressure exerted by an appeal by then West Indies captain Viv Richards, he returned with a well made 42 in Antigua against what was fast, accurate and intimidating bowling. Nevertheless, Bailey failed to reach a half-century in eight Test innings, and after that Antigua match never played for England again, despite his consistent performances in the 1990s. Thanks to a statistical quirk and a couple of not out innings, he retains an unusually high one-day international batting average of 68.50, the third highest of all England batters as of 2022.

Bailey is described by ESPNCricinfo as a loyal player and described by Michael Henderson as "one of the finest men to have played county cricket in the past 30 years", testament to his seventeen years at Northamptonshire before he left to join Derbyshire at the end of 1999 after his contract was not renewed by Northants. A highlight of his county career came when he won the 1992 Natwest Trophy with Northamptonshire, making 72 not out in the final.

=== Style ===
He was a middle order batsman and a part-time off spinner.

== Umpiring career ==
His playing retirement came in 2001 after which he was appointed to join the ECB's Reserve List of Umpires. Subsequently, he is now on the ECB First Class Umpires list after being promoted for the 2006 season.

He was one of the seventeen on-field umpires for the 2018 Under-19 Cricket World Cup.

== See also ==
- List of One Day International cricket umpires
- List of Twenty20 International cricket umpires
