= Tyron Henderson =

South African cricketer

Personal information
- Full name: Tyron Henderson
- Born: 1 August 1974 (age 52); Durban, Natal Province
- Nickname: The Blacksmith
- Batting: Right-handed
- Bowling: Right-arm fast-medium

International information
- National side: South Africa
- Only T20I (cap 25): 1 December 2006 v India

Domestic team information
- Years: Team
- 1998/99–2003/04: Border
- 2002–2003: Berkshire
- 2004/05–2005/06: Warriors
- 2006: Kent
- 2006/07: Lions
- 2007/08: Cape Cobras
- 2007–2010: Middlesex (squad no. 55)
- 2007/08: Boland
- 2009: Rajasthan Royals

Career statistics
Competition	T20I	FC	LA	T20
Matches	1	86	114	84
Runs scored	0	1,897	1,586	1,289
Batting average	0.00	15.80	21.43	20.14
100s/50s	0/0	0/6	1/7	0/7
Top score	0	81	126*	85
Balls bowled	24	15,744	4,915	1,354
Wickets	0	262	130	74
Bowling average	–	26.81	27.43	21.29
5 wickets in innings	–	10	3	0
10 wickets in match	–	1	0	0
Best bowling	–	7/67	5/5	4/29
Catches/stumpings	0/–	31/–	27/–	10/–
- Source: CricInfo, 9 April 2014

Tyron Henderson (born 1 August 1974) is a former South African professional cricketer who played in one international match for the South African national team. He was born in Durban in Natal Province.

== Cricket career ==
An all-rounder, Henderson played for a range of teams, both in South Africa and in England. He made his first-class and List A debuts in 1998–99 for Border. He moved to Highveld Lions for the 2006–07 season before playing for Cape Cobras and Boland in 2007–08. He was released by the Cobras at the end of the season and did not play professionally in South Africa afterwards.

Henderson played for Heriots Cricket Club in Scotland in 2000 and first played county cricket in England in 2002 for Minor County Berkshire. He played for Kent in 2006 before joining Middlesex in June 2007, initially as a short-term replacement for Chaminda Vaas. For the 2008 season he was re-signed by the county under the Kolpak ruling which meant he was unable to play for South Africa. In the 2008 Twenty20 Cup he scored 281 runs at an average of 40.14 and took 21 wickets. At the 2008 T20 Finals Henderson became the sixth player to have hit 50 sixes in Twenty20 cricket in a Man of the Match performance against the Durham Dynamos in the semi-final. In the final against Kent he bowled the final over of the match and ran out Justin Kemp to clinch the title for Middlesex. He continued to play Twenty 20 cricket for Middlesex until the end of the 2010 English cricket season. He was awarded his county cap by Middlesex in 2008.

He was purchased by Rajasthan Royals for $650,000 in the 2009 Indian Premier League auction, $550,000 more than his base price of $100,000. He played twice during the season for Rajasthan and had a "limited impact" in the competition.
