= Kent County Cricket Club in 2014 =

Kent County Cricket Club
2014 season
- Coach: (Cricket West Indies) Jimmy Adams
- Captain: (England) Rob Key
- Overseas player: (Australia) Doug Bollinger
- Ground(s): St Lawrence Ground, Canterbury; Nevill Ground, Tunbridge Wells
- County Championship: 6th, Division Two
- Royal London One-Day Cup: Semi-final
- NatWest t20 Blast: 6th, South Group
- Most runs: FC: DJ Bell-Drummond (1,058); LA: SW Billings (490); T20: RWT Key (384)
- Most wickets: FC: ME Claydon (59); LA: DE Bollinger (15); T20: DI Stevens (18)
- Most catches: FC: DI Stevens (16); LA: AJ Blake (5); DI Stevens (5); T20: AJ Ball (9)
- Most wicket-keeping dismissals: FC: SW Billings (59); LA: SW Billings (11); T20: SW Billings (11)

In 2014, Kent County Cricket Club competed in Division Two of the County Championship, Group B of the 50-over Royal London One-Day Cup and the South Group of the NatWest t20 Blast. Kent also hosted a first-class match at the St Lawrence Ground against Loughborough MCCU at the start of the season. It was the third season in charge for head coach Jimmy Adams. The club captain was former England batsmen Rob Key, who resumed the captaincy after James Tredwell had spent one season in the role. Australia bowler Doug Bollinger signed for the club for the 2014 season. Other new additions to the squad included fast bowlers Mitchell Claydon – who had a load spell with Kent in 2013 – from Durham, David Griffiths from Hampshire and former Kent player Robbie Joseph.

With young off-spinner Adam Riley getting an extended run in the side, James Tredwell signed a short-term loan deal with Sussex in order to play first-class cricket in Division One of the County Championship. He continued to play List A and T20 cricket for Kent during this time.

Kent had a slightly better season than in 2013, but remained struggling in mid-table of the County Championship Division Two and again made little impact in the NatWest t20 Blast. They did however reach the semi-finals of the Royal London One-Day Cup, where they were beaten by Warwickshire.

Bowler Mark Davies was forced to retire from playing in September after failing to recover from a shoulder injury. At the end of the season, and having lost his place in the first team to Sam Billings, former England wicket-keeper Geraint Jones left the county to join Gloucestershire as four-day captain after 15 seasons with Kent.

James Tredwell continued to earn international recognition for England in 2014, taking 23 wickets in 20 One Day Internationals (taking his total to 59 wickets in 44 ODIs) and 4 wickets in 10 T20 Internationals (for a career total of 7 wickets in 17 T20Is). Tredwell featured in all of England's matches at the 2014 World Twenty20.

== Squad ==
- No. denotes the player's squad number, as worn on the back of their shirt.
- Ages given as of the first day of the County Championship season, 6 April 2014.

No.	Name	Nationality	Birth date	Batting style	Bowling style	Notes
Batsmen
4	Rob Key	England	12 May 1979 (aged 34)	Right-handed	Right arm off break	Club captain
10	Alex Blake	England	25 January 1989 (aged 25)	Left-handed	Right arm medium-fast	
17	Sam Northeast	England	16 October 1989 (aged 24)	Right-handed	Right arm off break	Vice-captain
23	Daniel Bell-Drummond	England	3 August 1993 (aged 20)	Right-handed	Right arm medium	
30	Fabian Cowdrey	England	30 January 1993 (aged 21)	Right-handed	Slow left-arm orthodox	
40	Brendan Nash	Jamaica	14 December 1977 (aged 36)	Left-handed	Left arm medium	Kolpak Registration
All-rounders
3	Darren Stevens	England	30 April 1976 (aged 37)	Right-handed	Right arm medium	
21	Ben Harmison	England	9 January 1986 (aged 28)	Left-handed	Right arm medium-fast	
24	Adam Ball	England	1 March 1993 (aged 21)	Right-handed	Left arm fast-medium	
25	Calum Haggett	England	30 October 1990 (aged 23)	Left-handed	Right arm medium-fast	
26	Matt Coles	England	26 May 1990 (aged 23)	Left-handed	Right arm fast-medium	
Wicket-keepers
9	Geraint Jones	England	14 July 1979 (aged 34)	Right-handed	—	
20	Sam Billings	England	15 June 1991 (aged 22)	Right-handed	—	
Bowlers
5	Ivan Thomas	England	25 September 1991 (aged 22)	Right-handed	Right arm medium-fast	
6	Doug Bollinger	Australia	24 July 1981 (aged 32)	Left-handed	Left arm fast-medium	Overseas player
8	Mitchell Claydon	England	25 November 1982 (aged 31)	Left-handed	Right arm medium-fast	
11	Imran Qayyum	England	23 May 1993 (aged 20)	Right-handed	Slow left-arm orthodox	
12	Robbie Joseph	England	20 January 1982 (aged 32)	Right-handed	Right arm fast	
14	Matt Hunn	England	22 March 1994 (aged 20)	Right-handed	Right arm fast-medium	
15	James Tredwell	England	27 February 1982 (aged 32)	Left-handed	Right arm off break	
18	David Griffiths	England	10 November 1985 (aged 28)	Left-handed	Right arm fast-medium	
19	Sam Weller	England	21 November 1994 (aged 19)	Right-handed	Right arm fast-medium	
22	Charlie Hartley	England	4 January 1994 (aged 20)	Right-handed	Right arm medium-fast	
31	Mark Davies	England	4 October 1980 (aged 33)	Right-handed	Right arm medium	
33	Adam Riley	England	23 March 1992 (aged 22)	Right-handed	Right arm off break	

== County Championship ==
=== Division Two ===
Team	Pld	W	L	T	D	A	Bat	Bowl	Ded	Pts
Hampshire (P)	16	7	1	0	8	0	50	38	0	240
Worcestershire (P)	16	8	3	0	5	0	37	47	0	237
Essex	16	7	2	0	7	0	37	45	0	229
Derbyshire	16	6	5	0	5	0	26	41	0	188
Surrey	16	4	5	0	7	0	43	44	3	183
Kent	16	4	6	0	6	0	35	42	0	171
Gloucestershire	16	4	5	0	7	0	28	36	0	163
Glamorgan	16	3	6	0	7	0	29	41	0	153
Leicestershire	16	0	10	0	6	0	36	42	0	108

=== Matches ===
13–16 April	Worcestershire (H)	v	Kent	Worcestershire won by 125 runs
Scorecard	224 (76.3 overs); AN Kervezee 54 (102); RH Joseph 3/43 (17 overs)		229 (96.5 overs); DJ Bell-Drummond 61 (163); GM Andrew 4/42 (17 overs)	New Road, Worcester; Umpires: SC Gale and IJ Gould
Scorecard	270 (88.4 overs); OB Cox 89 (121); DE Bollinger 5/43 (19 overs)		140 (51 overs); BP Nash 28 (91); GM Andrew 4/43 (13 overs)	New Road, Worcester; Umpires: SC Gale and IJ Gould
Worcestershire won the toss and elected to bat; Points: Worcestershire 20, Kent 4

20–23 April	Leicestershire	v	(H) Kent	Match drawn
Scorecard	333 (96.5 overs); MAG Boyce 68 (137); DI Stevens 3/46 (24 overs)		269/7d (82.4 overs); DJ Bell-Drummond 58 (134); RML Taylor 2/40 (11 overs)	St Lawrence Ground, Canterbury; Umpires: NL Bainton and G Sharp
Scorecard	259/5d (59.1 overs); GP Smith 118 (175); DE Bollinger 2/48 (11 overs)		89/4 (36 overs); DJ Bell-Drummond 39* (110); JKH Naik 2/34 (15 overs)	St Lawrence Ground, Canterbury; Umpires: NL Bainton and G Sharp
Kent won the toss and elected to field; Points: Kent 10, Leicestershire 10

4–7 May	Surrey	v	(H) Kent	Kent won by 8 wickets
Scorecard	285 (102.5 overs); JJ Roy 60 (100); AEN Riley 4/77 (24 overs)		435 (112.2 overs); BP Nash 126 (157); MP Dunn 3/104 (27 overs)	St Lawrence Ground, Canterbury; Umpires: RK Illingworth and GD Lloyd
Scorecard	203 (87.5 overs); SM Davies 40 (65); AEN Riley 5/78 (34.5 overs)		54/2 (9.3 overs); DJ Bell-Drummond 29* (24); A Kapil 2/29 (5 overs)	St Lawrence Ground, Canterbury; Umpires: RK Illingworth and GD Lloyd
Surrey won the toss and elected to bat; Points: Kent 24, Surrey 5

11–14 May	Derbyshire (H)	v	Kent	Match drawn
Scorecard	118 (49.3 overs); AL Hughes 36* (85); DI Stevens 5/24 (20.3 overs)		235/6d (47.2 overs); BP Nash 95* (98); TD Groenewald 2/59 (11 overs)	County Ground, Derby; Umpires: SA Garratt and P Willey
Scorecard	106/0 (28 overs); SC Moore 73* (93)			County Ground, Derby; Umpires: SA Garratt and P Willey
Kent won the toss and elected to field; Points: Derbyshire 7, Kent 9

18–21 May	Gloucestershire (H)	v	Kent	Gloucestershire won by 290 runs
Scorecard	252 (78.4 overs); GH Roderick 59 (84); AEN Riley 3/51 (21.4 overs)		114 (46 overs); SW Billings 42 (103); WRS Gidman 4/14 (12 overs)	County Ground, Bristol; Umpires: IJ Gould and G Sharp
Scorecard	443/6d (103 overs); HJH Marshall 118 (243); DI Stevens 5/87 (21 overs)		291 (92.4 overs); BW Harmison 125 (218); WRS Gidman 3/54 (20 overs)	County Ground, Bristol; Umpires: IJ Gould and G Sharp
Gloucestershire won the toss and elected to bat; Points: Gloucestershire 21, Kent 3

25–28 May	Kent (H)	v	Worcestershire	Match drawn
Scorecard	258 (96.4 overs); SA Northeast 53 (132); J Leach 5/36 (12.4 overs)		67/0 (17 overs); DKH Mitchell 33* (55)	Nevill Ground, Tunbridge Wells; Umpires: JW Lloyds and SJ O'Shaughnessy
Kent won the toss and elected to bat; Points: Kent 7, Worcestershire 8

7–10 June	Kent (H)	v	Essex	Match drawn
Scorecard	387 (112 overs); DI Stevens 105 (99); JD Ryder 5/54 (23 overs)		440 (118 overs); RS Bopara 162 (294); ME Claydon 5/82 (27 overs)	St Lawrence Ground, Canterbury; Umpires: NGB Cook and NJ Llong
Scorecard	255/8d (91 overs); DJ Bell-Drummond 92 (257); JD Ryder 5/56 (22 overs)			St Lawrence Ground, Canterbury; Umpires: NGB Cook and NJ Llong
Kent won the toss and elected to bat; Points: Kent 11, Essex 13

15–18 June	Kent	v	(H) Glamorgan	Glamorgan won by an innings and 11 runs
Scorecard	253 (102.4 overs); RWT Key 63 (147); MG Hogan 5/58 (26.4 overs)		527 (141.2 overs); JA Rudolph 103 (170); AEN Riley 5/157 (42 overs)	Sophia Gardens, Cardiff; Umpires: NGC Cowley and AG Wharf
Scorecard	263 (71 overs); DI Stevens 60 (57); MG Hogan 5/67 (17 overs)			Sophia Gardens, Cardiff; Umpires: NGC Cowley and AG Wharf
Kent won the toss and elected to bat; Points: Glamorgan 24, Kent 3

22–24 June	Kent (H)	v	Derbyshire	Kent won by 10 wickets
Scorecard	333 (120.3 overs); DJ Bell-Drummond 101 (268); AP Palladino 5/62 (30 overs)		115 (48 overs); AP Palladino 24 (63); AEN Riley 4/30 (16 overs)	St Lawrence Ground, Canterbury; Umpires: RJ Bailey and MJD Bodenham
Scorecard	41/0 (10.1 overs); RWT Key 26* (29)		256 (92.1 overs) (f/o); AL Hughes 82 (174); DI Stevens 6/64 (30)	St Lawrence Ground, Canterbury; Umpires: RJ Bailey and MJD Bodenham
Kent won the toss and elected to bat; Points: Kent 22, Derbyshire 2

7–10 July	Leicestershire (H)	v	Kent	Kent won by 6 wickets
Scorecard	217 (55 overs); AJ Robson 56 (80); ME Claydon 5/77 (21 overs)		302 (86.4 overs); ME Claydon 77 (91); NL Buck 4/97 (26 overs)	Grace Road, Leicester; Umpires: AK Chaudhary and PJ Hartley
Scorecard	388 (103.1 overs); JJ Cobb 137 (243); DI Stevens 5/85 (33.1 overs)		306/4 (68.5 overs); SA Northeast 112* (143); NL Buck 2/68 (17 overs)	Grace Road, Leicester; Umpires: AK Chaudhary and PJ Hartley
Kent won the toss and elected to field; Points: Leicestershire 4, Kent 22

20–23 July	Kent	v	(H) Surrey	Kent won by 89 runs
Scorecard	408 (110 overs); SA Northeast 91 (153); SC Meaker 4/106 (34 overs)		398 (109.4 overs); JJ Roy 84 (115); DI Stevens 4/110 (32 overs)	Woodbridge Road, Guildford; Umpires: RJ Bailey and PK Baldwin
Scorecard	292 (83.2 overs); RWT Key 59 (114); SC Meaker 7/90 (28.2 overs)		213 (53.5 overs); TM Dilshan 68 (64); DI Stevens 5/68 (20.5 overs)	Woodbridge Road, Guildford; Umpires: RJ Bailey and PK Baldwin
Surrey won the toss and elected to field; Points: Surrey 7, Kent 24

15–18 August	Hampshire	v	(H) Kent	Hampshire won by 196 runs
Scorecard	380 (107.1 overs); SM Ervine 75 (112); ME Claydon 3/72 (25 overs)		191 (55.1 overs); DI Stevens 64 (68); CP Wood 5/39 (14 overs)	St Lawrence Ground, Canterbury; Umpires: BJ Debenham and MA Gough
Scorecard	311/5d (84.4 overs); JHK Adams 97 (198); FK Cowdrey 3/59 (12.4 overs)		304 (88.4 overs); DI Stevens 74 (81); MT Coles 3/68 (21 overs)	St Lawrence Ground, Canterbury; Umpires: BJ Debenham and MA Gough
Hampshire won the toss and elected to bat; Points: Kent 3, Hampshire 23

31 August – 3 September	Glamorgan	v	(H) Kent	Match drawn
Scorecard	329 (89.1 overs); CB Cooke 171 (214); ME Claydon 4/47 (20 overs)		387 (132.3 overs); SA Northeast 102 (202); KA Bull 4/62 (25.3 overs)	St Lawrence Ground, Canterbury; Umpires: NL Bainton and DJ Millns
Scorecard	415/9d (112.1 overs); GG Wagg 116* (183); ME Claydon 3/36 (15 overs)			St Lawrence Ground, Canterbury; Umpires: NL Bainton and DJ Millns
Glamorgan won the toss and elected to bat; Points: Kent 11, Glamorgan 9

9–11 September	Kent	v	(H) Essex	Essex won by 9 wickets
Scorecard	198 (61.4 overs); SA Northeast 117 (151); GR Napier 3/44 (13 overs)		328 (92.1 overs); JS Foster 108 (188); DI Stevens 5/83 (30.1 overs)	County Ground, Chelmsford; Umpires: SC Gale and IJ Gould
Scorecard	151 (43.2 overs); BP Nash 34 (37); GR Napier 4/28 (9.2 overs)		22/1 (2.5 overs); T Westley 8* (4); MD Hunn 1/7 (1 overs)	County Ground, Chelmsford; Umpires: SC Gale and IJ Gould
Kent won the toss and elected to bat; Points: Essex 22, Kent 3

15–18 September	Kent	v	(H) Hampshire	Match drawn
Scorecard	507 (149.4 overs); DJ Bell-Drummond 153 (336); MT Coles 4/84 (31 overs)		351 (104.5 overs); SM Ervine 121 (173); JC Tredwell 4/102 (32.5 overs)	Ageas Bowl, Southampton; Umpires: NGC Cowley and DJ Millns
Scorecard			248/9 (95 overs) (f/o); WR Smith 142* (304); AEN Riley 4/36 (19 overs)	Ageas Bowl, Southampton; Umpires: NGC Cowley and DJ Millns
Kent won the toss and elected to bat; Points: Hampshire 10, Kent 12

23–26 September	Gloucestershire	v	(H) Kent	Gloucestershire won by 244 runs
Scorecard	179 (57 overs); DA Payne 54* (89); ME Claydon 5/61 (20 overs)		164 (63.4 overs); SW Billings 73 (118); CN Miles 3/20 (13 overs)	St Lawrence Ground, Canterbury; Umpires: NL Bainton and SA Garratt
Scorecard	432 (115.3 overs); APR Gidman 140 (178); DA Griffiths 6/63 (21.3 overs)		203 (57.1 overs); SA Northeast 62 (114); TMJ Smith 4/35 (10.1 overs)	St Lawrence Ground, Canterbury; Umpires: NL Bainton and SA Garratt
Gloucestershire won the toss and elected to bat; Points: Kent 3, Gloucestershire 19

== Other first-class match ==
=== MCCU Matches ===
7–9 April (three-day match)	Loughborough MCCU	v	(H) Kent	Match drawn
Scorecard	271 (84.2 overs); WA MacVicar 79 (101); ME Claydon 4/50 (18.2 overs)		339/5d (89.5 overs); DJ Bell-Drummond 103 (176); WA MacVicar 1/21 (10 overs)	St Lawrence Ground, Canterbury; Umpires: RJ Bailey and RJ Evans
Kent won the toss and elected to field

== Royal London One-Day Cup ==
=== Group B ===
Pos	Team	Pld	W	L	T	NR	Ded	Pts	NRR
1	Nottinghamshire Outlaws	8	4	1	1	2	0	11	0.364
2	Kent Spitfires	8	4	1	1	2	0	11	0.245
3	Warwickshire Bears	8	4	3	0	1	0	9	0.343
4	Durham	8	4	3	0	1	0	9	0.212
5	Glamorgan	8	4	4	0	0	0	8	0.230
6	Somerset	8	3	4	1	0	0	7	0.067
7	Middlesex Panthers	8	3	4	0	1	0	7	−0.280
8	Sussex Sharks	8	3	5	0	0	0	6	−0.501
9	Surrey	8	1	5	1	1	0	4	−0.643

=== Matches ===
29 July	Durham; 271/7 (50 overs)	v	(H) Kent; 274/8 (49.2 overs)	Kent won by 2 wickets (with 4 balls remaining)
Scorecard	Durham; 271/7 (50 overs)	v	(H) Kent; 274/8 (49.2 overs)	St Lawrence Ground, Canterbury; Umpires: MJD Bodenham and MA Gough
Scorecard	CS MacLeod 94 (139); ME Claydon 2/41 (9 overs)		SW Billings 64 (54); C Rushworth 3/59 (10 overs)	St Lawrence Ground, Canterbury; Umpires: MJD Bodenham and MA Gough
Durham won the toss and elected to bat; Points: Kent 2, Durham 0				St Lawrence Ground, Canterbury; Umpires: MJD Bodenham and MA Gough

31 July	Kent; 383/7 (50 overs)	v	(H) Somerset; 371/8 (48 overs)	Kent won by 2 runs (D/L method)
Scorecard	Kent; 383/7 (50 overs)	v	(H) Somerset; 371/8 (48 overs)	County Ground, Taunton; Umpires: NGC Cowley and DJ Millns
Scorecard	SW Billings 135* (58); AC Thomas 2/82 (10 overs)		NRD Compton 56 (59); DE Bollinger 3/77 (10 overs)	County Ground, Taunton; Umpires: NGC Cowley and DJ Millns
Somerset won the toss and elected to field; Rain reduced the Somerset innings to 48 overs with a target of 374 to win; Points: Somerset 0, Kent 2				County Ground, Taunton; Umpires: NGC Cowley and DJ Millns

5 August	Kent; 314/8 (50 overs)	v	(H) Surrey; 314/9 (50 overs)	Match tied
Scorecard	Kent; 314/8 (50 overs)	v	(H) Surrey; 314/9 (50 overs)	The Oval, Kennington, London; Umpires: SA Garratt and PJ Hartley
Scorecard	SW Billings 87 (42); CT Tremlett 4/38 (10 overs)		VS Solanki 83 (88); JC Tredwell 2/42 (10 overs)	The Oval, Kennington, London; Umpires: SA Garratt and PJ Hartley
Kent won the toss and elected to bat; Points: Surrey 1, Kent 1				The Oval, Kennington, London; Umpires: SA Garratt and PJ Hartley

6 August	Glamorgan; 209 (46.4 overs)	v	(H) Kent; 210/4 (43.4 overs)	Kent won by 6 wickets (with 38 balls remaining)
Scorecard	Glamorgan; 209 (46.4 overs)	v	(H) Kent; 210/4 (43.4 overs)	St Lawrence Ground, Canterbury; Umpires: NA Mallender and G Sharp
Scorecard	CB Cooke 73 (100); DE Bollinger 5/35 (10 overs)		DI Stevens 62* (59); DA Cosker 3/56 (10 overs)	St Lawrence Ground, Canterbury; Umpires: NA Mallender and G Sharp
Glamorgan won the toss and elected to bat; Points: Kent 2, Glamorgan 0				St Lawrence Ground, Canterbury; Umpires: NA Mallender and G Sharp

8 August	Nottinghamshire (H); 228/7 (38 overs)	v	Kent; 48/2 (8 overs)	No result
Scorecard	Nottinghamshire (H); 228/7 (38 overs)	v	Kent; 48/2 (8 overs)	Trent Bridge, Nottingham; Umpires: NGB Cook and SC Gale
Scorecard	CB Cooke 62 (60); ME Claydon 3/37 (8 overs)		SA Northeast 21 (28); A Shahzad 1/9 (2 overs)	Trent Bridge, Nottingham; Umpires: NGB Cook and SC Gale
Nottinghamshire won the toss and elected to bat; Match reduced to 43 overs per side before play began due to rain. Rain interrupted the Nottinghamshire innings after 16 overs, and the match was reduced to 38 overs per side. Kent were set a (Duckworth-Lewis) target of 232 from 38 overs to win, but the innings was ended by rain after 8 overs.; Points: Nottinghamshire 1, Kent 1				Trent Bridge, Nottingham; Umpires: NGB Cook and SC Gale

10 August	Warwickshire (H)	v	Kent	No result (match abandoned without a toss)
Scorecard	Warwickshire (H)	v	Kent	Rugby School Ground, Rugby; Umpires: RJ Bailey and NL Bainton
Points: Warwickshire 1, Kent 1				Rugby School Ground, Rugby; Umpires: RJ Bailey and NL Bainton

13 August	Kent (H); 299 (49.5 overs)	v	Sussex; 183 (31.3 overs)	Kent won 59 runs (D/L method)
Scorecard	Kent (H); 299 (49.5 overs)	v	Sussex; 183 (31.3 overs)	St Lawrence Ground, Canterbury; Umpires: RJ Evans and MA Gough
Scorecard	DJ Bell-Drummond 83 (103); Yasir Arafat 4/49 (9.5 overs)		EC Joyce 47 (39); JC Tredwell 4/27 (7 overs)	St Lawrence Ground, Canterbury; Umpires: RJ Evans and MA Gough
Sussex won the toss and elected to field; Rain reduced the Sussex innings to 45 overs with a target of 284 to win. A further rain delay after 14.5 overs reduced the Sussex innings to 35 overs with a target of 243 to win.; Points: Kent 2, Sussex 0				St Lawrence Ground, Canterbury; Umpires: RJ Evans and MA Gough

20 August	Kent (H); 191 (43.1 overs)	v	Middlesex; 193/3 (43.5 overs)	Middlesex won by 7 wickets (with 37 balls remaining)
Scorecard	Kent (H); 191 (43.1 overs)	v	Middlesex; 193/3 (43.5 overs)	St Lawrence Ground, Canterbury; Umpires: NGC Cowley and AG Wharf
Scorecard	DJ Bell-Drummond 51 (70); JL Denly 2/31 (5 overs)		DC Malan 76* (123); JC Tredwell 1/28 (10 overs)	St Lawrence Ground, Canterbury; Umpires: NGC Cowley and AG Wharf
Middlesex won the toss and elected to field; Points: Kent 0, Middlesex 2				St Lawrence Ground, Canterbury; Umpires: NGC Cowley and AG Wharf

=== Quarter-finals ===
29 August	Kent (H); 242 (48.3 overs)	v	Gloucestershire; 218 (47.3 overs)	Kent won by 24 runs
Scorecard	Kent (H); 242 (48.3 overs)	v	Gloucestershire; 218 (47.3 overs)	St Lawrence Ground, Canterbury; Umpires: SJ O'Shaughnessy and P Willey; Player of the match: SW Billings
Scorecard	SA Northeast 78 (123); DA Payne 5/44 (9.3 overs)		GH Roderick 43 (66); FK Cowdrey 2/28 (6 overs)	St Lawrence Ground, Canterbury; Umpires: SJ O'Shaughnessy and P Willey; Player of the match: SW Billings
Kent won the toss and elected to bat				St Lawrence Ground, Canterbury; Umpires: SJ O'Shaughnessy and P Willey; Player of the match: SW Billings

=== Semi-finals ===
4 September	Kent; 215/8 (50 overs)	v	(H) Warwickshire; 219/4 (46.3 overs)	Warwickshire won by 6 wickets (with 21 balls remaining)
Scorecard	Kent; 215/8 (50 overs)	v	(H) Warwickshire; 219/4 (46.3 overs)	Edgbaston, Birmingham; Umpires: SJ O'Shaughnessy and RT Robinson; Player of the match: WB Rankin
Scorecard	SW Billings 40* (40); WB Rankin 3/34 (10 overs)		IJL Trott 58 (68); DA Griffiths 2/29 (8 overs)	Edgbaston, Birmingham; Umpires: SJ O'Shaughnessy and RT Robinson; Player of the match: WB Rankin
Kent won the toss and elected to bat				Edgbaston, Birmingham; Umpires: SJ O'Shaughnessy and RT Robinson; Player of the match: WB Rankin

== Other List A Matches ==
=== Tour Matches ===
2014 Sri Lanka tour of England

16 May	Sri Lankans; 301/7 (50 overs)	v	(H) Kent; 173 (36.3 overs)	Sri Lanka won by 128 runs
Scorecard	Sri Lankans; 301/7 (50 overs)	v	(H) Kent; 173 (36.3 overs)	St Lawrence Ground, Canterbury; Umpires: I Dawood and RA Kettleborough
Scorecard	AD Mathews 51 (59); RH Joseph 4/58 (10 overs)		AJ Blake 60 (65); RAS Lakmal 3/16 (7 overs)	St Lawrence Ground, Canterbury; Umpires: I Dawood and RA Kettleborough
Kent won the toss and elected to field				St Lawrence Ground, Canterbury; Umpires: I Dawood and RA Kettleborough

27 August	New Zealand A 239 (48.2 overs)	v	(H) Kent; 67 (23.4 overs)	New Zealand A won by 172 runs
Scorecard	New Zealand A 239 (48.2 overs)	v	(H) Kent; 67 (23.4 overs)	St Lawrence Ground, Canterbury; Umpires: SJ O'Shaughnessy and BV Taylor
Scorecard	DG Brownlie 112 (101); DA Griffiths 3/59 (8 overs)		DJ Bell-Drummond 19 (35); MD Craig 3/6 (2.4 overs)	St Lawrence Ground, Canterbury; Umpires: SJ O'Shaughnessy and BV Taylor
Kent won the toss and elected to field; Originally scheduled as a three-day first-class match (25–27 August), but after no play on days 1 and 2 due to rain, match was abandoned early and replaced with a one-day List A match				St Lawrence Ground, Canterbury; Umpires: SJ O'Shaughnessy and BV Taylor

== NatWest t20 Blast ==
=== South Group ===
Pos	Team	Pld	W	L	T	NR	Ded	Pts	NRR
1	Essex Eagles	14	10	4	0	0	0	20	0.401
2	Surrey	14	9	5	0	0	0	18	0.426
3	Hampshire	14	9	5	0	0	0	18	0.136
4	Glamorgan	14	6	5	1	2	0	15	0.145
5	Somerset	14	6	7	0	1	0	13	−0.107
6	Kent Spitfires	14	6	7	1	0	0	13	−0.229
7	Sussex Sharks	14	6	8	0	0	0	12	−0.022
8	Gloucestershire Gladiators	14	5	7	0	2	2	10	−0.362
9	Middlesex Panthers	14	2	11	0	1	0	5	−0.457

=== Matches ===
23 May	Kent; 164/5 (13 overs)	v	(H) Somerset; 122/5 (15 overs)	Kent won by 42 runs
Scorecard	Kent; 164/5 (13 overs)	v	(H) Somerset; 122/5 (15 overs)	County Ground, Taunton; Umpires: M Burns and NA Mallender; Player of the match: DJ Bell-Drummond (Kent)
Scorecard	DJ Bell-Drummond 59 (30); DP Nannes 2/15 (3 overs)		JC Hildreth 58* (29); DE Bollinger 3/36 (3 overs)	County Ground, Taunton; Umpires: M Burns and NA Mallender; Player of the match: DJ Bell-Drummond (Kent)
Somerset won the toss and elected to field; Match reduced to 13 overs per side before play began due to rain; Points: Somerset 2, Kent 0				County Ground, Taunton; Umpires: M Burns and NA Mallender; Player of the match: DJ Bell-Drummond (Kent)

30 May	Kent (H); 172/6 (20 overs)	v	Gloucestershire; 115/9 (20.0 overs)	Kent won by 21 runs
Scorecard	Kent (H); 172/6 (20 overs)	v	Gloucestershire; 115/9 (20.0 overs)	St Lawrence Ground, Canterbury; Umpires: MJD Bodenham and G Sharp; Player of the match: AEN Riley (Kent)
Scorecard	AJ Blake 41 (30); BAC Howell 3/21 (4 overs)		HJH Marshall 26 (20); AEN Riley 4/22 (4 overs)	St Lawrence Ground, Canterbury; Umpires: MJD Bodenham and G Sharp; Player of the match: AEN Riley (Kent)
Kent won the toss and elected to bat; Points: Kent 2, Gloucestershire 0				St Lawrence Ground, Canterbury; Umpires: MJD Bodenham and G Sharp; Player of the match: AEN Riley (Kent)

5 June	Hampshire (H); 171/7 (20 overs)	v	Kent; 149/4 (20 overs)	Hampshire won by 22 runs
Scorecard	Hampshire (H); 171/7 (20 overs)	v	Kent; 149/4 (20 overs)	Ageas Bowl, Southampton; Umpires: GD Lloyd and P Willey; Player of the match: MA Carberry (Hampshire)
Scorecard	MA Carberry 73 (58); DE Bollinger 3/19 (4 overs)		RWT Key 89* (63); DR Briggs 3/28 (4 overs)	Ageas Bowl, Southampton; Umpires: GD Lloyd and P Willey; Player of the match: MA Carberry (Hampshire)
Hampshire won the toss and elected to bat; Points: Hampshire 2, Kent 0				Ageas Bowl, Southampton; Umpires: GD Lloyd and P Willey; Player of the match: MA Carberry (Hampshire)

6 June	Kent (H); 208/4 (20 overs)	v	Middlesex; 192 (19.4 overs)	Kent won by 16 runs
Scorecard	Kent (H); 208/4 (20 overs)	v	Middlesex; 192 (19.4 overs)	St Lawrence Ground, Canterbury; Umpires: NGB Cook and NJ Llong; Player of the match: DT Christian (Middlesex)
Scorecard	AJ Blake 58* (31); DT Christian 2/29 (3 overs)		DT Christian 129 (57); DA Griffiths 4/22 (3.4 overs)	St Lawrence Ground, Canterbury; Umpires: NGB Cook and NJ Llong; Player of the match: DT Christian (Middlesex)
Kent won the toss and elected to bat; Points: Kent 2, Middlesex 0				St Lawrence Ground, Canterbury; Umpires: NGB Cook and NJ Llong; Player of the match: DT Christian (Middlesex)

11 June	Kent (H); 189/5 (20 overs)	v	Essex; 193/4 (19 overs)	Essex won by 6 wickets (with 6 balls remaining)
Scorecard	Kent (H); 189/5 (20 overs)	v	Essex; 193/4 (19 overs)	St Lawrence Ground, Canterbury; Umpires: RJ Bailey and SA Garratt; Player of the match: RS Bopara (Essex)
Scorecard	RWT Key 62 (40); TS Mills 3/41 (4 overs)		RS Bopara 81* (44); DI Stevens 2/30 (4 overs)	St Lawrence Ground, Canterbury; Umpires: RJ Bailey and SA Garratt; Player of the match: RS Bopara (Essex)
Kent won the toss and elected to bat; Points: Kent 0, Essex 2				St Lawrence Ground, Canterbury; Umpires: RJ Bailey and SA Garratt; Player of the match: RS Bopara (Essex)

13 June	Glamorgan (H); 177/7 (20 overs)	v	Kent; 177/9 (20 overs)	Match tied
Scorecard	Glamorgan (H); 177/7 (20 overs)	v	Kent; 177/9 (20 overs)	Sophia Gardens, Cardiff; Umpires: GD Lloyd and DJ Millns; Player of the match: DI Stevens (Kent)
Scorecard	J Allenby 54 (37); DI Stevens 3/22 (4 overs)		DI Stevens 71 (39); DJG Sammy 2/29 (4 overs)	Sophia Gardens, Cardiff; Umpires: GD Lloyd and DJ Millns; Player of the match: DI Stevens (Kent)
Kent won the toss and elected to field; Points: Glamorgan 1, Kent 1				Sophia Gardens, Cardiff; Umpires: GD Lloyd and DJ Millns; Player of the match: DI Stevens (Kent)

20 June	Sussex; 149/8 (20 overs)	v	(H) Kent; 114 (18.4 overs)	Sussex won by 35 runs
Scorecard	Sussex; 149/8 (20 overs)	v	(H) Kent; 114 (18.4 overs)	St Lawrence Ground, Canterbury; Umpires: JH Evans and NA Mallender; Player of the match: LJ Wright (Sussex)
Scorecard	LJ Wright 85 (61); JC Tredwell 2/20 (4 overs)		SW Billings 23 (20); SA Piollet 3/14 (4 overs)	St Lawrence Ground, Canterbury; Umpires: JH Evans and NA Mallender; Player of the match: LJ Wright (Sussex)
Sussex won the toss and elected to bat; Points: Kent 0, Sussex 2				St Lawrence Ground, Canterbury; Umpires: JH Evans and NA Mallender; Player of the match: LJ Wright (Sussex)

27 June	Kent; 150/6 (20 overs)	v	(H) Gloucestershire; 154/7 (20 overs)	Gloucestershire won by 3 wickets (with 0 balls remaining)
Scorecard	Kent; 150/6 (20 overs)	v	(H) Gloucestershire; 154/7 (20 overs)	County Ground, Bristol; Umpires: JH Evans and PJ Hartley; Player of the match: AP Rouse (Gloucestershire)
Scorecard	SA Northeast 75 (49); GJ McCarter 2/26 (4 overs)		AP Rouse 35* (16); ME Claydon 3/24 (4 overs)	County Ground, Bristol; Umpires: JH Evans and PJ Hartley; Player of the match: AP Rouse (Gloucestershire)
Gloucestershire won the toss and elected to field; Points: Gloucestershire 2, Kent 0				County Ground, Bristol; Umpires: JH Evans and PJ Hartley; Player of the match: AP Rouse (Gloucestershire)

2 July	Kent; 155/4 (20 overs)	v	(H) Surrey; 156/2 (17.5 overs)	Surrey won by 8 wickets (with 13 balls remaining)
Scorecard	Kent; 155/4 (20 overs)	v	(H) Surrey; 156/2 (17.5 overs)	The Oval, Kennington, London; Umpires: RT Robinson and AG Wharf; Player of the match: JJ Roy (Surrey)
Scorecard	DI Stevens 56* (38); RJ Peterson 1/22 (4 overs)		JJ Roy 79 (46); FK Cowdrey 1/20 (3.5 overs)	The Oval, Kennington, London; Umpires: RT Robinson and AG Wharf; Player of the match: JJ Roy (Surrey)
Surrey won the toss and elected to field; Points: Surrey 2, Kent 0				The Oval, Kennington, London; Umpires: RT Robinson and AG Wharf; Player of the match: JJ Roy (Surrey)

4 July	Hampshire; 173/9 (20 overs)	v	(H) Kent; 126 (18.4 overs)	Hampshire won by 47 runs
Scorecard	Hampshire; 173/9 (20 overs)	v	(H) Kent; 126 (18.4 overs)	St Lawrence Ground, Canterbury; Umpires: NL Bainton and RT Robinson; Player of the match: WR Smith (Hampshire)
Scorecard	SM Ervine 47 (35); ME Claydon 2/26 (4 overs)		AJ Blake 26 (22); CP Wood 4/24 (3.4 overs)	St Lawrence Ground, Canterbury; Umpires: NL Bainton and RT Robinson; Player of the match: WR Smith (Hampshire)
Kent won the toss and elected to field; Points: Kent 0, Hampshire 2				St Lawrence Ground, Canterbury; Umpires: NL Bainton and RT Robinson; Player of the match: WR Smith (Hampshire)

11 July	Kent; 149/9 (20 overs)	v	(H) Sussex; 146/9 (20 overs)	Kent won by 3 runs
Scorecard	Kent; 149/9 (20 overs)	v	(H) Sussex; 146/9 (20 overs)	County Ground, Hove; Umpires: JW Lloyds and DJ Millns; Player of the match: AJ Blake (Kent)
Scorecard	AJ Blake 53* (32); WAT Beer 3/18 (4 overs)		CJ Jordan 37 (26); BW Harmison 3/35 (4 overs)	County Ground, Hove; Umpires: JW Lloyds and DJ Millns; Player of the match: AJ Blake (Kent)
Sussex won the toss and elected to field; Points: Sussex 0, Kent 2				County Ground, Hove; Umpires: JW Lloyds and DJ Millns; Player of the match: AJ Blake (Kent)

12 July	Essex (H); 209/5 (20 overs)	v	Kent; 146 (15.5 overs)	Essex won by 63 runs
Scorecard	Essex (H); 209/5 (20 overs)	v	Kent; 146 (15.5 overs)	Castle Park Cricket Ground, Colchester; Umpires: NA Mallender and RT Robinson; Player of the match: T Westley (Essex)
Scorecard	T Westley 105 (58); ME Claydon 2/23 (4 overs)		SA Northeast 41 (32); JD Ryder 5/27 (3.5 overs)	Castle Park Cricket Ground, Colchester; Umpires: NA Mallender and RT Robinson; Player of the match: T Westley (Essex)
Kent won the toss and elected to field; Points: Essex 2, Kent 0				Castle Park Cricket Ground, Colchester; Umpires: NA Mallender and RT Robinson; Player of the match: T Westley (Essex)

18 July	Kent (H); 195/7 (20 overs)	v	Somerset; 59/5 (7.5 overs)	Kent won by 40 runs (D/L method)
Scorecard	Kent (H); 195/7 (20 overs)	v	Somerset; 59/5 (7.5 overs)	St Lawrence Ground, Canterbury; Umpires: SJ O'Shaughnessy and P Willey; Player of the match: SA Northeast (Kent)
Scorecard	SA Northeast 73 (45); DP Nannes 3/30 (4 overs)		CA Ingram 37* (18); DI Stevens 4/17 (4 overs)	St Lawrence Ground, Canterbury; Umpires: SJ O'Shaughnessy and P Willey; Player of the match: SA Northeast (Kent)
Kent won the toss and elected to bat; Rain ended the match after 7.3 overs of the Somerset innings, with a Duckworth-Lewis target of 100 runs to win.; Points: Kent 2, Somerset 0				St Lawrence Ground, Canterbury; Umpires: SJ O'Shaughnessy and P Willey; Player of the match: SA Northeast (Kent)

25 July	Kent (H); 175/7 (20 overs)	v	Surrey; 154/7 (20 overs)	Kent won by runs 21 runs
Scorecard	Kent (H); 175/7 (20 overs)	v	Surrey; 154/7 (20 overs)	St Lawrence Ground, Canterbury; Umpires: JH Evans and RT Robinson; Player of the match: DI Stevens (Kent)
Scorecard	DI Stevens 67 (38); Azhar Mahmood 3/43 (4 overs)		TM Dilshan 46 (30); ME Claydon 2/27 (4 overs)	St Lawrence Ground, Canterbury; Umpires: JH Evans and RT Robinson; Player of the match: DI Stevens (Kent)
Kent won the toss and elected to bat; Points: Kent 2, Surrey 0				St Lawrence Ground, Canterbury; Umpires: JH Evans and RT Robinson; Player of the match: DI Stevens (Kent)
