= Kent County Cricket Club in 2017 =

Kent County Cricket Club
2017 season
- Coach: (England) Matthew Walker
- Captain: (England) Sam Northeast
- Overseas players: (South Africa) Wayne Parnell (April–May) (Pakistan) Yasir Shah (June–July) (New Zealand) Adam Milne (June–September) (New Zealand) James Neesham (July–August, t20 only)
- Ground(s): St Lawrence Ground, Canterbury; Nevill Ground, Tunbridge Wells; County Ground, Beckenham
- County Championship: 5th, Division Two
- Royal London One-Day Cup: 9th, South Group
- NatWest t20 Blast: 6th, South Group
- 2016–17 Regional Super50: 3rd, Group A
- Most runs: FC: JL Denly (1,266); LA: DJ Bell-Drummond (584); T20: JL Denly (567)
- Most wickets: FC: DI Stevens (63); LA: MT Coles (17); T20: AF Milne (15)
- Most catches: FC: WRS Gidman (14); LA: DI Stevens; DJ Bell-Drummond (8); T20: AJ Blake (11)
- Most wicket-keeping dismissals: FC: AP Rouse (34); LA: AP Rouse (12); T20: SW Billings (9)

In 2017, Kent County Cricket Club competed in Division Two of the County Championship, the Royal London One-Day Cup and the NatWest t20 Blast. In addition, before the start of the English cricket season, Kent competed in the 2016–17 Regional Super50, the List A competition of the West Indian domestic season. This was the first time that any English county had competed in an overseas domestic competition. The invitation to take part in the tournament was largely due to the influence of former West Indian captain Jimmy Adams who had been Kent's Head Coach until September 2016.

The season was the first in charge for new head coach and former player, Matthew Walker. Former South African fast-bowler Allan Donald was announced as the new assistant coach, but his arrival was delayed while he worked towards the ECB level three qualification he required to gain the visa necessary to take up the role. Former Yorkshire coach, and Australia fast-bowler, Jason Gillespie was appointed as assistant coach on an interim basis for the first few weeks of the season. It was later announced that Donald would not be joining up with Kent until 2018. Sam Northeast retained the club captaincy for a second season.

Joe Denly won the club's Player of the Year award, having scored over 1,895 runs across all formats.

== Squad ==
=== Departures ===
Fast bowler David Griffiths left the club at the end of his contract in September 2016 after three seasons with Kent and academy graduate Sam Weller left without having played for the first XI (he had played 6 First Class matches for Oxford MCCU during his time with Kent). Hardus Viljoen, who had a brief spell with Kent as an overseas player at the end of the 2016 season, signed a Kolpak deal with Derbyshire. Reports suggest that Kent had first refusal on signing Viljoen, but opted not to match Derbyshire's offer.

On the eve of the season Fabian Cowdrey left the club by mutual consent to pursue opportunities outside of cricket.

Adam Ball, Hugh Bernard and Charlie Hartley were released by Kent at the end of the season. Matt Coles also left his home county to join county champions Essex in October.

=== Arrivals ===
Having impressed while on loan at the county in 2016, Will Gidman signed a permanent contract with Kent in October 2016 after he was released by Nottinghamshire. Academy wicket-keeper Ollie Robinson made his senior debut for the county in the final match of the 2016–17 Regional Super50 tournament after being called into the touring squad as cover for Adam Rouse with Sam Billings away on England duty. Robinson went on to sign his first professional contract with the club at the end of the season. In March, Kent announced the signing of former England Under 19 captain Joe Weatherley on loan from Hampshire for the 2017 season, although he stayed with the county only for the first half of the season. Middlesex fast bowler James Harris followed as another loan signing in early April, initially for the first three County Championship matches and the first section of the 2017 Royal London One-Day Cup.

On 10 April, Kent announced the signing of South African international left-arm fast bowler Wayne Parnell, who had previously played for the county during the 2009 season, as an overseas player on a short-term contract. Parnell was available to play in the County Championship and Royal London One-Day Cup until he joined up with the South African national team when they began their tour of England in May. New Zealand fast bowler Adam Milne joined the team as an overseas player for the second half of the season after the conclusion of the ICC Champions Trophy that took place in England and Wales during the first half of June and Pakistan leg-spinner Yasir Shah played two County Championship games during the middle of the season. Zealand all-rounder Jimmy Neesham played in the T20 Blast campaign alongside Milne.

Australian-born fast-bowling all-rounder Grant Stewart signed his first professional contract with Kent at the end of August after impressing while on trial with the second XI as well as in the Kent Premier League with Sandwich Town. He holds an EU passport through his Italian mother and was not classed as an overseas player.

=== Squad list ===
- Ages given as of the first day of the 2017 County Championship season, 7 April 2017.

No.	Name	Nationality	Birth date	Batting style	Bowling style	Notes
Batsmen
6	Joe Denly	England	16 March 1986 (aged 31)	Right-handed	Right arm leg break	
9	Joe Weatherley	England	19 January 1997 (aged 20)	Right-handed	Right arm off break	On loan from Hampshire (first half of the season)
10	Alex Blake	England	25 January 1989 (aged 28)	Left-handed	Right arm medium-fast	
16	Zak Crawley	England	3 February 1998 (aged 19)	Right-handed	Right arm medium	
17	Sam Northeast	England	16 October 1989 (aged 27)	Right-handed	Right arm off break	Club captain
23	Daniel Bell-Drummond	England	3 August 1993 (aged 23)	Right-handed	Right arm medium	
58	Sean Dickson	South Africa	2 September 1991 (aged 25)	Right-handed	Right arm medium	British passport holder
All-rounders
3	Darren Stevens	England	30 April 1976 (aged 40)	Right-handed	Right arm medium	
9	Grant Stewart	Australia	19 February 1994 (aged 23)	Right-handed	Right arm medium	Signed 30 August
24	Adam Ball	England	1 March 1993 (aged 24)	Right-handed	Left arm fast-medium	
25	Calum Haggett	England	30 October 1990 (aged 26)	Left-handed	Right arm medium-fast	
26	Matt Coles	England	26 May 1990 (aged 26)	Left-handed	Right arm fast-medium	
42	Will Gidman	England	14 February 1985 (aged 32)	Left-handed	Right arm medium	
83	Jimmy Neesham	New Zealand	17 September 1990 (aged 26)	Left-handed	Right arm medium	Overseas player July–August (T20 Blast only)
Wicket-keepers
7	Sam Billings	England	15 June 1991 (aged 25)	Right-handed	—	
12	Adam Rouse	England	30 June 1992 (aged 24)	Right-handed	—	
–	Ollie Robinson	England	1 December 1998 (aged 18)	Right-handed	—	
Bowlers
4	James Harris	Wales	16 May 1990 (aged 26)	Right-handed	Right arm medium-fast	On loan from Middlesex (April–May)
5	Ivan Thomas	England	25 September 1991 (aged 25)	Right-handed	Right arm medium-fast	
8	Mitchell Claydon	England	25 November 1982 (aged 34)	Left-handed	Right arm medium-fast	
11	Imran Qayyum	England	23 May 1993 (aged 23)	Right-handed	Slow left-arm orthodox	
14	Matt Hunn	England	22 March 1994 (aged 23)	Right-handed	Right arm fast-medium	
15	James Tredwell	England	27 February 1982 (aged 35)	Left-handed	Right arm off break	
20	Adam Milne	New Zealand	13 April 1992 (aged 24)	Right-handed	Right arm fast	Overseas player June–September
22	Charlie Hartley	England	4 January 1994 (aged 23)	Right-handed	Right arm medium-fast	
27	Hugh Bernard	England	14 September 1996 (aged 20)	Right-handed	Right arm medium-fast	
33	Adam Riley	England	23 March 1992 (aged 25)	Right-handed	Right arm off break	
36	Wayne Parnell	South Africa	30 July 1989 (aged 27)	Left-handed	Left arm fast	Overseas player April–early May
86	Yasir Shah	Pakistan	2 May 1986 (aged 30)	Right-handed	Leg spin	Overseas player June–early July

== Regional Super50 ==
At the beginning of the year, Kent competed in the 2016–17 Regional Super50, a List A tournament that is part of the West Indian domestic season, after accepting an invitation from the West Indies Cricket Board. The competition took place between 24 January and 18 February. It was the first time that Kent had competed in an overseas competition.

Kent were drawn in Group A, and played two matches against each of the other teams in the group: Leeward Islands, Trinidad and Tobago, Windward Islands and the West Indies under-19 cricket team. Group B included the other three regular teams of West Indian domestic cricket (Barbados, Guyana and Jamaica) and two development teams (Combined Campuses and Colleges and ICC Americas).

Kent began the tournament with a seven wicket loss to the Leeward islands at the Coolidge Cricket Ground in Antigua before consecutive wins against Trinidad and Tobago and Windward Islands. Four consecutive losses saw the county knocked out of the tournament at the group stage before a win in their final match of the competition. The tournament was viewed by Kent as an opportunity for warm weather preparation for the English domestic season.

=== Group A ===
Pos	Team	Pld	W	L	T	NR	BP	Pts	NRR
1	Trinidad and Tobago	8	7	1	0	0	3	31	1.263
2	Leeward Islands	8	6	2	0	0	4	28	1.323
3	Kent	8	3	5	0	0	1	13	−0.307
4	Windward Islands	8	3	5	0	0	0	12	−0.445
5	West Indies U19	8	1	7	0	0	0	4	−1.681

Source: CricInfo

=== Matches ===
25 January	Kent; 233/9 (50 overs)	v	Leeward Islands; 237/3 (43.3 overs)	Leeward island won by 7 wickets (with 39 balls remaining)
Scorecard	Kent; 233/9 (50 overs)	v	Leeward Islands; 237/3 (43.3 overs)	Coolidge Cricket Ground, Antigua; Umpires: GO Brathwaite and CM Taylor; Player of the match: NE Bonner (Leeward islands)
Scorecard	CJ Haggett 45 (59); GC Tonge 4/39 (10 overs)		NE Bonner 78 (103); AEN Riley 2/41 (8 overs)	Coolidge Cricket Ground, Antigua; Umpires: GO Brathwaite and CM Taylor; Player of the match: NE Bonner (Leeward islands)
Leeward Islands won the toss and elected to field; Points: Leeward Islands 4, Kent 0 Five penalty runs were awarded to the Leeward Islands due to the batting team running on the wicket during Kent's innings HR Bernard and Imran Qayyum made their List A debuts				Coolidge Cricket Ground, Antigua; Umpires: GO Brathwaite and CM Taylor; Player of the match: NE Bonner (Leeward islands)

29 January	Trinidad and Tobago; 193 (48.3 overs)	v	Kent; 194/5 (36.1 overs)	Kent won by 5 wickets (with 83 balls remaining)
Scorecard	Trinidad and Tobago; 193 (48.3 overs)	v	Kent; 194/5 (36.1 overs)	Sir Vivian Richards Stadium, North Sound, Antigua; Umpires: GO Brathwaite and VM Smith; Player of the match: DI Stevens (Kent)
Scorecard	RS Primus 60 (72); IAA Thomas 4/51 (9.3 overs)		SR Dickson 56 (67); R Rampaul 3/46 (6 overs)	Sir Vivian Richards Stadium, North Sound, Antigua; Umpires: GO Brathwaite and VM Smith; Player of the match: DI Stevens (Kent)
Kent won the toss and elected to field; Points: Kent 5, Trinidad and Tobago 0				Sir Vivian Richards Stadium, North Sound, Antigua; Umpires: GO Brathwaite and VM Smith; Player of the match: DI Stevens (Kent)

31 January	Windward Islands; 241/9 (50 overs)	v	Kent; 242/5 (46.1 overs)	Kent won by 4 wickets (with 23 balls remaining)
Scorecard	Windward Islands; 241/9 (50 overs)	v	Kent; 242/5 (46.1 overs)	Coolidge Cricket Ground, Antigua; Umpires: GO Brathwaite and VM Smith; Player of the match: AJ Ball (Kent)
Scorecard	SW Ambris 50 (69); CJ Haggett 4/59 (10 overs)		SA Northeast 49 (70); S Shillingford 2/36 (10 overs)	Coolidge Cricket Ground, Antigua; Umpires: GO Brathwaite and VM Smith; Player of the match: AJ Ball (Kent)
Kent won the toss and elected to field; Points: Kent 4, Windward Islands 0				Coolidge Cricket Ground, Antigua; Umpires: GO Brathwaite and VM Smith; Player of the match: AJ Ball (Kent)

2 February	West Indies Under-19s; 155 (46.3 overs)	v	Kent; 127 (34 overs)	West Indies Under-19s won by 28 runs
Scorecard	West Indies Under-19s; 155 (46.3 overs)	v	Kent; 127 (34 overs)	Sir Vivian Richards Stadium, North Sound, Antigua; Umpires: CM Taylor and CM Tuckett; Player of the match: B Yadram (West Indies Under-19s)
Scorecard	M Patrick 45 (79); IAA Thomas 3/39 (8.3 overs)		SA Northeast 37 (61); J Bishop 4/44 (10 overs)	Sir Vivian Richards Stadium, North Sound, Antigua; Umpires: CM Taylor and CM Tuckett; Player of the match: B Yadram (West Indies Under-19s)
Kent won the toss and elected to field; Points: West Indies Under-19s 4, Kent 0				Sir Vivian Richards Stadium, North Sound, Antigua; Umpires: CM Taylor and CM Tuckett; Player of the match: B Yadram (West Indies Under-19s)

4 February	Leeward Islands; 275/9 (50 overs)	v	Kent; 170 (39.3 overs)	Leeward Islands won by 105 runs
Scorecard	Leeward Islands; 275/9 (50 overs)	v	Kent; 170 (39.3 overs)	Coolidge Cricket Ground, Antigua; Umpires: GO Brathwaite and CM Tuckett; Player of the match: KOA Powell (Leeward Islands)
Scorecard	KOA Powell 106 (111); MT Coles 4/52 (10 overs)		AJ Blake 44 (76); AS Joseph 3/62 (9.3 overs)	Coolidge Cricket Ground, Antigua; Umpires: GO Brathwaite and CM Tuckett; Player of the match: KOA Powell (Leeward Islands)
Leeward Islands won the toss and elected to bat; Points: Leeward Islands 5, Kent 0				Coolidge Cricket Ground, Antigua; Umpires: GO Brathwaite and CM Tuckett; Player of the match: KOA Powell (Leeward Islands)

8 February	Kent; 194 (46 overs)	v	Trinidad and Tobago; 198/5 (41.2 overs)	Trinidad and Tobago won by 5 wickets (with 52 balls remaining)
Scorecard	Kent; 194 (46 overs)	v	Trinidad and Tobago; 198/5 (41.2 overs)	Sir Vivian Richards Stadium, North Sound, Antigua; Umpires: GO Brathwaite and VM Smith; Player of the match: R Rampaul (Trinidad and Tobago)
Scorecard	WRS Gidman 50 (77); R Rampaul 4/37 (10 overs)		JN Mohammed 78* (88); DI Stevens 3/34 (10 overs)	Sir Vivian Richards Stadium, North Sound, Antigua; Umpires: GO Brathwaite and VM Smith; Player of the match: R Rampaul (Trinidad and Tobago)
Trinidad and Tobago won the toss and elected to field; Points: Trinidad and Tobago 4, Kent 0				Sir Vivian Richards Stadium, North Sound, Antigua; Umpires: GO Brathwaite and VM Smith; Player of the match: R Rampaul (Trinidad and Tobago)

10 February	Kent; 205 (48.5 overs)	v	Windward Islands; 207/4 (47.5 overs)	Windward Islands won by 6 wickets (with 13 balls remaining)
Scorecard	Kent; 205 (48.5 overs)	v	Windward Islands; 207/4 (47.5 overs)	Coolidge Cricket Ground, Antigua; Umpires: GO Brathwaite and CM Taylor; Player of the match: WRS Gidman (Kent)
Scorecard	WRS Gidman 94 (106); DE Johnson 2/14 (5 overs)		KAR Hodge 68 (101); IAA Thomas 2/54 (10 overs)	Coolidge Cricket Ground, Antigua; Umpires: GO Brathwaite and CM Taylor; Player of the match: WRS Gidman (Kent)
Kent won the toss and elected to bat; Points: Windward Islands 4, Kent 0				Coolidge Cricket Ground, Antigua; Umpires: GO Brathwaite and CM Taylor; Player of the match: WRS Gidman (Kent)

12 February	West Indies Under-19s; 191/8 (50 overs)	v	Kent; 192/4 (44.5 overs)	Kent won by 6 wickets (with 31 balls remaining)
Scorecard	West Indies Under-19s; 191/8 (50 overs)	v	Kent; 192/4 (44.5 overs)	Sir Vivian Richards Stadium, North Sound, Antigua; Umpires: PA Gustard and CM Tuckett; Player of the match: KMA Paul (West Indies U19)
Scorecard	KMA Paul 72 (57); MT Coles 3/42 (10 overs)		AP Rouse 61* (105); OC McCoy 2/47 (7.5 overs)	Sir Vivian Richards Stadium, North Sound, Antigua; Umpires: PA Gustard and CM Tuckett; Player of the match: KMA Paul (West Indies U19)
West Indies Under-19s won the toss and elected to bat; Points: Kent 4, West Indies Under-19s 0 OG Robinson made his List A debut				Sir Vivian Richards Stadium, North Sound, Antigua; Umpires: PA Gustard and CM Tuckett; Player of the match: KMA Paul (West Indies U19)

== County Championship ==
Kent played 14 County Championship Division Two matches in 2017. The Championship was restructured for 2017, with Division Two having ten teams, leaving the remaining eight counties in Division One instead of the previous nine-nine split. Teams in both divisions played fewer matches than in 2016 (14 instead of 16), meaning that teams in Division Two played five of their rivals twice and the other four teams only once during the season.

Kent's opening fixture was at home against Gloucestershire, starting on 7 April at the St Lawrence Ground, a match they won by 334 runs after bowling Gloucestershire out for a total of 61 in their second innings with Darren Stevens taking 6/22. They played seven home matches in total, five at the St Lawrence Ground and one each at the Nevill Ground in Tunbridge Wells and the County Cricket Ground, Beckenham. One fixture, an away game against Nottinghamshire, was a day–night match, part of an experiment by the England and Wales Cricket Board ahead of the staging of the first UK day–night Test match in August.

Kent started strongly, winning four of their first five matches. However, in a frustrating remainder of the season they failed to win any further matches in the championship and slipped to 5th place in the table. One match, against Derbyshire at Queen's Park, Chesterfield in September, was abandoned as a draw without a ball being bowled due to heavy rain and a wet outfield. As a result, the team only played 13 of the scheduled 14 matches.

=== Division Two ===
Team	Pld	W	L	T	D	A	Bat	Bowl	Ded	Pts
Worcestershire (P)	14	9	3	0	2	0	45	39	0	238
Nottinghamshire (P)	14	7	2	0	5	0	44	41	0	222
Northamptonshire	14	9	3	0	2	0	29	39	5	217
Sussex	14	7	5	0	2	0	35	39	0	196
Kent	14	4	2	0	7	1	35	36	0	175
Gloucestershire	14	3	4	0	7	0	29	35	0	147
Glamorgan	14	3	7	0	4	0	25	40	0	133
Derbyshire	14	3	7	0	3	1	29	30	0	127
Durham	14	3	6	0	5	0	36	37	48	98
Leicestershire	14	0	9	0	5	0	32	34	16	75

Source: CricInfo

- Worcestershire and Nottinghamshire were promoted to Division One
- Durham were deducted 48 points by the ECB for accepting a financial aid package during the 2016 season.
- Leicestershire were deducted 16 points by the ECB for a breach in player conduct.
- Northamptonshire were deducted five points for a slow over rate against Nottinghamshire in August.

=== Matches ===
7–9 April	Kent (H)	v	Gloucestershire	Kent won by 334 runs
Scorecard	298 (89 overs); JL Denly 62 (106); LC Norwell 3/46 (18 overs)		149 (59.3 overs); CDJ Dent 67 (145); ME Claydon 4/35 (12 overs)	St Lawrence Ground, Canterbury; Umpires: RJ Bailey and PK Baldwin
Scorecard	246 (75.1 overs); JL Denly 59 (111); LC Norwell 5/59 (16 overs)		61 (20.4 overs); LC Norwell 24 (34); DI Stevens 6/22 (9 overs)	St Lawrence Ground, Canterbury; Umpires: RJ Bailey and PK Baldwin
Toss uncontested, Gloucestershire elected to field; Points: Kent 21, Gloucestershire 3 JJ Weatherley and JAR Harris made their Kent debuts

14–17 April	Kent	v	Sussex (H)	Kent won by 226 runs
Scorecard	304 (87.3 overs); SR Dickson 68 (179); DI Stevens 68 (83); JC Archer 7/67 (23.3 overs)		291 (76.5 overs); BC Brown 90 (116); ME Claydon 4/87 (16 overs)	County Cricket Ground, Hove; Umpires: M Burns and RJ Evans
Scorecard	413/5d (97 overs); SA Northeast 173* (181); Ajmal Shahzad 3/96 (27 overs)		200 (50.1 overs); BC Brown 69* (67); DI Stevens 5/51 (15 overs)	County Cricket Ground, Hove; Umpires: M Burns and RJ Evans
Kent won the toss and elected to bat; Points: Sussex 5, Kent 22

21–23 April	Kent (H)	v	Derbyshire	Kent won by 169 runs
Scorecard	259 (84.5 overs); SR Dickson 41 (68); WD Parnell 41 (65); WS Davis 4/75 (20.5 overs)		159 (43.2 overs); WL Madsen 56 (95); DI Stevens 6/47 (17 overs)	St Lawrence Ground, Canterbury; Umpires: NL Bainton and RT Robinson
Scorecard	308 (72.4 overs); AP Rouse 95* (121); WS Davis 3/48 (17 overs)		239 (61.2 overs); GC Wilson 97 (107); JAR Harris 4/56 (13 overs)	St Lawrence Ground, Canterbury; Umpires: NL Bainton and RT Robinson
Toss uncontested, Derbyshire elected to field; Points: Kent 21, Derbyshire 3

19–22 May	Leicestershire (H)	v	Kent	Match drawn
Scorecard	420 (112.4 overs); CN Ackermann 89 (194); MD Hunn 3/110 (22 overs)		462/9d (96.1 overs); DI Stevens 100 (98); D Klein 4/108 (21 overs)	Grace Road, Leicester; Umpires: JH Evans and RJ Evans
Scorecard	61/2d (18.5 overs); PJ Horton 40 (47); MD Hunn 1/2 (3.5 overs)			Grace Road, Leicester; Umpires: JH Evans and RJ Evans
Toss uncontested, Kent elected to field.; No play possible on day one due to rain and a wet outfield; only 47.3 overs possible on day two; Points: Leicestershire 13, Kent 13

26–29 May	Kent (H)	v	Sussex	Kent won by 147 runs
Scorecard	369; JL Denly 119 (208); D Wiese 3/54 (15 overs)		168; D Wiese 36 (72); DI Stevens 5/40 (17 overs)	Nevill Ground, Tunbridge Wells; Umpires: SC Gale and PJ Hartley
Scorecard	298/2d (67 overs); DJ Bell-Drummond 90 (150); S van Zyl 1/42 (9 overs)		356 (105.4 overs); S van Zyl 78 (134); JAR Harris 4/103 (26.4 overs)	Nevill Ground, Tunbridge Wells; Umpires: SC Gale and PJ Hartley
Kent won the toss and elected to bat; Points: Kent 23, Sussex 3

8–11 June	Kent (H)	v	Durham	Match drawn
Scorecard	448 (136.1 overs); PD Collingwood 120 (208); DI Stevens 5/78 (35 overs)		236 (64.3 overs); SA Northeast 109* (178); BJ McCarthy 6/63 (19.3 overs)	St Lawrence Ground, Canterbury; Umpires: JH Evans and SA Garratt
Scorecard	271/6d (70 overs); G Clark 83 (106); Yasir Shah 2/94 (19 overs)		343/9 (106 overs); SA Northeast 72 (151); C Rushworth 3/62 (25 overs)	St Lawrence Ground, Canterbury; Umpires: JH Evans and SA Garratt
Durham won the toss and elected to bat; Points: Kent 8, Durham 12 Yasir Shah made his Kent debut

19–22 June	Kent	v	(H) Worcestershire	Worcestershire won by 4 wickets
Scorecard	260 (73.1 overs); MT Coles 47 (63); J Leach 3/42 (14 overs)		336 (85.4 overs); JM Clarke 142 (197); MT Coles 6/84 (18.4 overs)	New Road, Worcester; Umpires: RK Illingworth and Nitin Menon
Scorecard	474 (116.4 overs); JL Denly 227 (320); J Leach 4/79 (24 overs)		401/6 (81.5 overs); DKH Mitchell 142 (243); Yasir Shah 5/132 (27.5 overs)	New Road, Worcester; Umpires: RK Illingworth and Nitin Menon
Kent won the toss and elected to bat; Points: Worcestershire 22, Kent 5 JL Denly's 227 in the second innings was his highest score in first-class cricket

26–29 June	Kent	v	(H) Nottinghamshire	Match drawn
Scorecard	180 (54 overs); DJ Bell-Drummond 84* (169); SJ Mullaney 3/2 (3 overs)		371 (104 overs); SJ Mullaney 168 (276); MT Coles 3/99 (23 overs)	Trent Bridge, Nottingham; Umpires: NL Bainton and GD Lloyd
Scorecard	265 (92.2 overs); AF Milne 51 (88); HF Gurney 3/63 (21 overs)			Trent Bridge, Nottingham; Umpires: NL Bainton and GD Lloyd
Kent won the toss and elected to bat; No play before tea (first session) and only 40 overs possible in total on day 3 due to rain. No play before tea (first session) and after the close of the Kent second innings on day 4 due to rain.; Points: Nottinghamshire 12, Kent 8 Day-night match AF Milne made his kent debut JJ Weatherley replaced SW Billings after day two due to an England Lions call-up; Billings retired not out on 39 in the second innings. DI Stevens retired hurt in the Kent second innings and was unable to resume his innings due to concussion protocols.

3–6 July	Kent (H)	v	Northamptonshire	Match drawn
Scorecard	701/7d (143.1 overs); SR Dickson 318 (408); MDE Holden 2/59 (9 overs)		568 (156.2 overs); MDE Holden 153 (265); Yasir Shah 4/165 (57 overs)	County Cricket Ground, Beckenham; Umpires: PK Baldwin and DJ Millns
Scorecard	184/3d (58 overs); JL Denly 78* (172); BW Sanderson 1/7 (4 overs)			County Cricket Ground, Beckenham; Umpires: PK Baldwin and DJ Millns
Kent won the toss and elected to bat; Points: Kent 11, Northamptonshire 9 Kent's first innings score of 701/7 dec was the second highest innings score in first-class matches for the county and the highest score made at a home ground. The 2nd wicket partnership between SR Dickson and JL Denly of 382 runs set a new first-class record for any partnership for the county. SR Dickson's score of 318 was his highest first-class score, the second highest individual score for Kent in first-class matches and the third triple-century scored for the county.

28–31 August	Leicestershire	v	(H) Kent	Match drawn
Scorecard	350 (101.4 overs); LJ Hill 85* (184); DI Stevens 8/75 (25.4 overs)		333 (93.5 overs); SA Northeast 97 (170); NJ Dexter 5/76 (20 overs)	St Lawrence Ground, Canterbury; Umpires: MJ Saggers and R Warren
Scorecard	135/6 (36 overs); CN Ackermann 34 (58); MJ Cosgrove 34 (19); Imran Qayyum 2/25 (10 overs)			St Lawrence Ground, Canterbury; Umpires: MJ Saggers and R Warren
Leicestershire won the toss and elected to bat; No play on day 3 or after tea on day 4 due to rain; Points: Kent 11, Leicestershire 12

5–8 September	Durham (H)	v	Kent	Match drawn
Scorecard	217 (67.2 overs); MA Wood 72* (89); ME Claydon 5/54 (16.2 overs)		206 (43.5 overs); SA Northeast 110 (115); G Onions 6/62 (14 overs)	Riverside Ground, Chester-le-Street; Umpires: SC Gale and MA Gough
Scorecard	359/7 (88.3 overs); TWM Latham 119 (242); CJ Haggett 3/82 (24 overs)		184/9 (56 overs); SW Billings 70* (96); WJ Weighell 3/51 (12 overs)	Riverside Ground, Chester-le-Street; Umpires: SC Gale and MA Gough
Toss uncontested, Kent elected to field; No play before tea on day one due to rain. Play was stopped early in all three sessions on day three due to further rain.; Points: Durham 9, Kent 9

12–15 September	Gloucestershire (H)	v	Kent	Match drawn
Scorecard	385 (131.5 overs); CT Bancroft 206* (393); DI Stevens 3/50 (19 overs)		386 (97 overs); SA Northeast 66 (90); J Shaw 5/118 (25 overs)	Bristol County Ground; Umpires: JH Evans and R Warren
Scorecard	249/9d (95 overs); CT Bancroft 72 (182); DI Stevens 5/77 (20 overs)			Bristol County Ground; Umpires: JH Evans and R Warren
Toss uncontested, Kent elected to field; No play before lunch on day two due to rain; Points: Gloucestershire 11, Kent 12

19–22 September	Derbyshire (H)	v	Kent	Match abandoned without a ball bowled
Scorecard				Queen's Park, Chesterfield; Umpires: SC Gale and BV Taylor
No toss; No play due to rain and a wet outfield; Points: Derbyshire 5, Kent 5 The match was originally due to be played at Derby

25–28 September	Kent (H)	v	Glamorgan	Glamorgan won by 5 wickets
Scorecard	302 (81.2 overs); JL Denly 152 (204); MG Hogan 4/44 (18.2 overs)		229 (71.3 overs); CB Cooke 49 (73); CJ Haggett 3/40 (15 overs)	St Lawrence Ground, Canterbury; Umpires: NGC Cowley and JW Lloyds
Scorecard	115 (43.2 overs); AP Rouse 44 (84); MG Hogan 6/43 (15.2 overs)		192/5 (62.2 overs); NJ Selman 70 (127); DI Stevens 3/53 (19 overs)	St Lawrence Ground, Canterbury; Umpires: NGC Cowley and JW Lloyds
Toss uncontested, Glamorgan elected to field; Stumps, day two: Points: Kent 6, Glamorgan 20 G Stewart made his first-class debut AP Rouse replaced SW Billings during day two due to a call up to the England squad.

== Other first-class matches ==
Kent began the 2017 English cricket season with a three-day University match against Leeds/Bradford MCC University on 28 March and played a three-day match against the touring West Indians at the beginning of August. The fixture against the West Indians formed the centre-piece of the 166th Canterbury Cricket Week.

28–30 March	Kent (H)	v	Leeds/Bradford MCCU	Kent won by 212 runs
Scorecard	370/6d (94 overs); DI Stevens 115 (152); OS Bocking 2/55 (16 overs)		204 (77 overs); BJ Shoare 47 (116); AJ Ball 2/10 (7 overs)	St Lawrence Ground, Canterbury; Umpires: M Newell and MJ Saggers
Scorecard	156/5d (44 overs); AJ Ball 50 (89); OS Bocking 4/52 (15 overs)		110 (51.2 overs); CD Wallace 23 (47); WRS Gidman 3/0 (1.2 overs)	St Lawrence Ground, Canterbury; Umpires: M Newell and MJ Saggers
Kent won the toss and elected to bat

6–8 August	West Indians	v	(H) Kent	Match drawn
Scorecard	265 (83.4 overs); SD Hope 57 (121); CF Hartley 4/80 (17.4 overs)		331/9d (93.2 overs); SR Dickson 142 (210); AS Joseph 4/72 (22 overs)	St Lawrence Ground, Canterbury; Umpires: JD Middlebrook and AG Wharf
Scorecard	132/4 (36.4 overs); SO Hetmyer 43* (39); CF Hartley 2/44 (11.4 overs)			St Lawrence Ground, Canterbury; Umpires: JD Middlebrook and AG Wharf
West Indians won the toss and elected to bat; Z Crawley made his first-class debut

== Royal London One-Day Cup ==
Kent competed in the South group of the 2017 Royal London One-Day Cup. They played each of the other eight teams in the group once, with all four home games being played at the St Lawrence Ground in Canterbury. A disappointing campaign saw Kent finish bottom of the table, with just a single win against Middlesex. After an early elimination, the starting eleven increasingly featured fringe squad players, particularly in the bowling department, and academy graduate batsman Zak Crawley made his senior debut in the final match against Essex.

Daniel Bell-Drummond had a good tournament, scoring successive centuries against Somerset and Sussex, as well as two half centuries. Alex Blake also scored a century against Somerset, his first in List A cricket, reaching 116 from just 58 balls. Darren Stevens, on his 300th List A appearance, scored a career-high 147 from just 67 deliveries (including 10 fours and 14 sixes) against Glamorgan at Swansea, almost leading Kent to an unlikely victory and setting a new record for Kent's highest individual score in List A cricket.

=== South Group ===
Pos	Team	Pld	W	L	T	NR	Ded	Pts	NRR
1	Essex (Note: advanced directly to the semi-finals)	8	7	1	0	0	0	14	0.882
2	Somerset (Note: advanced to the quarter-finals)	8	5	2	0	1	0	11	0.543
3	Surrey	8	4	3	0	1	0	9	0.101
4	Glamorgan	8	4	4	0	0	0	8	−0.660
5	Sussex	8	3	3	0	2	0	8	0.535
6	Hampshire	8	3	4	0	1	0	7	−0.109
7	Gloucestershire	8	3	4	0	1	0	7	−0.435
8	Middlesex	8	2	4	0	2	0	6	−0.243
9	Kent	8	1	7	0	0	0	2	−0.409

Source: BBC Sport

=== Matches ===
27 April	Kent (H); 258 (49.4 overs)	v	Hampshire; 260/4 (45.1 overs)	Hampshire won by 6 wickets (with 29 balls remaining)
Scorecard	Kent (H); 258 (49.4 overs)	v	Hampshire; 260/4 (45.1 overs)	St Lawrence Ground, Canterbury; Umpires: PR Pollard and MJ Saggers
Scorecard	DI Stevens 60 (57); RJW Topley 3/65 (9/4 overs)		TP Alsop 112* (132); ME Claydon 2/51 (8 overs)	St Lawrence Ground, Canterbury; Umpires: PR Pollard and MJ Saggers
Hampshire won the toss and elected to field; Points: Kent 0, Hampshire 2				St Lawrence Ground, Canterbury; Umpires: PR Pollard and MJ Saggers

2 May	Kent; 352/6 (50 overs)	v	(H) Somerset; 354/6 (47.3 overs)	Somerset won by 4 wickets (with 15 balls remaining)
Scorecard	Kent; 352/6 (50 overs)	v	(H) Somerset; 354/6 (47.3 overs)	County Ground, Taunton; Umpires: ID Blackwell and JW Lloyds
Scorecard	AJ Blake 116 (58); C Overton 3/66 (10 overs)		PD Trego 135 (119); JC Tredwell 3/65 (10 overs)	County Ground, Taunton; Umpires: ID Blackwell and JW Lloyds
Kent won the toss and elected to bat; Points: Somerset 2, Kent 0 AJ Blake scored his first List A century				County Ground, Taunton; Umpires: ID Blackwell and JW Lloyds

5 May	Kent (H); 331/7 (50 overs)	v	Sussex; 332/4 (46.5 overs)	Sussex won by 6 wickets (with 13 balls remaining)
Scorecard	Kent (H); 331/7 (50 overs)	v	Sussex; 332/4 (46.5 overs)	St Lawrence Ground, Canterbury; Umpires: BJ Debenham and NJ Llong
Scorecard	DJ Bell-Drummond 138 (138); JC Archer 3/54 (10 overs)		LJ Evans 134* (86); JC Tredwell 1/39 (10 overs)	St Lawrence Ground, Canterbury; Umpires: BJ Debenham and NJ Llong
Sussex won the toss and elected to field; Points: Kent 0, Sussex 2				St Lawrence Ground, Canterbury; Umpires: BJ Debenham and NJ Llong

7 May	Kent (H); 200 (46 overs)	v	Middlesex; 154 (46 overs)	Kent won by 46 runs
Scorecard	Kent (H); 200 (46 overs)	v	Middlesex; 154 (46 overs)	St Lawrence Ground, Canterbury; Umpires: IJ Gould and MJ Saggers
Scorecard	SA Northeast 55 (78); TS Roland-Jones 3/35 (10 overs)		NRD Compton 37 (85); JL Denly 3/20 (6 overs)	St Lawrence Ground, Canterbury; Umpires: IJ Gould and MJ Saggers
Middlesex won the toss and elected to field; Points: Kent 2, Middlesex 0				St Lawrence Ground, Canterbury; Umpires: IJ Gould and MJ Saggers

10 May	Gloucestershire (H); 275/8 (50 overs)	v	Kent; 264/9 (50 overs)	Gloucestershire won by 11 runs
Scorecard	Gloucestershire (H); 275/8 (50 overs)	v	Kent; 264/9 (50 overs)	Bristol County Ground; Umpires: PJ Hartley and JW Lloyds
Scorecard	M Klinger 134 (145); MT Coles 4/57 (10 overs)		DJ Bell-Drummond 90 (108); CJ Liddle 5/36 (10 overs)	Bristol County Ground; Umpires: PJ Hartley and JW Lloyds
Kent won the toss and elected to field; Points: Gloucestershire 2, Kent 0				Bristol County Ground; Umpires: PJ Hartley and JW Lloyds

12 May	Surrey (H); 251/7 (41 overs)	v	Kent; 204 (35.4 overs)	Surrey won by 44 runs (D/L method)
Scorecard	Surrey (H); 251/7 (41 overs)	v	Kent; 204 (35.4 overs)	The Oval, London; Umpires: RJ Bailey and BV Taylor
Scorecard	BT Foakes 82* (80); DI Stevens 2/37 (8 overs)		SW Billings 69 (65); SC Meaker 4/37 (6.4 overs)	The Oval, London; Umpires: RJ Bailey and BV Taylor
Kent won the toss and elected to field; Rain delays early in Surrey's innings resulted in the match being reduced to 41 overs per side. Kent were set a revised (D/L target of 249 runs to win.); Points: Surrey 2, Kent 0				The Oval, London; Umpires: RJ Bailey and BV Taylor

14 May	Glamorgan (H); 356/7 (50 overs)	v	Kent; 341 (47.2 overs)	Glamorgan won by 15 runs
Scorecard	Glamorgan (H); 356/7 (50 overs)	v	Kent; 341 (47.2 overs)	St. Helen's Rugby and Cricket Ground, Swansea; Umpires: NGC Cowley and MA Gough
Scorecard	CA Ingram 114 (98); MT Coles 2/32 (9 overs)		DI Stevens 147 (67); DL Lloyd 5/53 (10 overs)	St. Helen's Rugby and Cricket Ground, Swansea; Umpires: NGC Cowley and MA Gough
Kent won the toss and elected to field; Points: Glamorgan 2, Kent 0				St. Helen's Rugby and Cricket Ground, Swansea; Umpires: NGC Cowley and MA Gough

17 May	Essex; 307/6 (50 overs)	v	(H) Kent; 50/3 (11 overs)	Essex won by 57 runs (D/L method)
Scorecard	Essex; 307/6 (50 overs)	v	(H) Kent; 50/3 (11 overs)	St Lawrence Ground, Canterbury; Umpires: NGC Cowley and SC Gale
Scorecard	V Chopra 83 (98); CJ Haggett 2/59 (10 overs)		DJ Bell-Drummond 25* (28); Ashar Zaidi 2/10 (2 overs)	St Lawrence Ground, Canterbury; Umpires: NGC Cowley and SC Gale
Kent won the toss and elected to field; Rain stopped play after 11 overs of Kent's innings; Z Crawley made his senior debut				St Lawrence Ground, Canterbury; Umpires: NGC Cowley and SC Gale

== NatWest t20 Blast ==
Kent played in the South group of the 2017 NatWest t20 Blast. The county played 14 matches, facing each team in the group at least once. They played seven home matches, one at County Cricket Ground, Beckenham and the other six at the St Lawrence Ground in Canterbury. In a very tight group, Kent went into the final game against Surrey needing a win to progress to the quarter-finals, but lost by 10 runs.

Joe Denly scored two hundreds during the campaign. In a memorable match at The Oval against Surrey he scored 166 not out as Kent chased a total of 205 to win by eight wickets. Later in the tournament he scored 127 against Essex County Cricket Club at County Ground, Chelmsford as part of a first-wicket stand of 207 runs with Daniel Bell-Drummond. This set records for Kent's Twenty20 highest individual score and partnership and, as of the end of the season, was the highest partnership score for any wicket in T20 cricket in the UK, the third highest anywhere in the world and was a world record for the first wicket.

Adam Milne took five wickets in the fixture against Somerset and recorded Kent's best bowling figures in Twenty20 cricket with 5/11.

=== South Group ===
Pos	Team	Pld	W	L	T	NR	Ded	Pts	NRR
1	Glamorgan	14	7	3	0	4	0	18	0.045
2	Surrey	14	7	5	0	2	0	16	−0.130
3	Hampshire	14	7	6	0	1	0	15	−0.021
4	Somerset	14	6	6	0	2	0	14	0.491
5	Sussex Sharks	14	5	5	1	3	0	14	0.423
6	Kent Spitfires	14	6	7	1	0	0	13	−0.158
7	Middlesex	14	5	7	1	1	0	12	0.221
8	Essex Eagles	14	5	7	0	2	0	12	−0.204
9	Gloucestershire	14	4	6	1	3	0	12	−0.648

Source: BBC Sport

=== Matches ===
9 July	Essex; 166/8 (20 overs)	v	(H) Kent; 169/3 (20 overs)	Kent won by 7 wickets (with 9 balls remaining)
Scorecard	Essex; 166/8 (20 overs)	v	(H) Kent; 169/3 (20 overs)	County Cricket Ground, Beckenham; Umpires: RA Kettleborough and AG Wharf; Player of the match: DJ Bell-Drummond (Kent)
Scorecard	V Chopra 47 (38); JDS Neesham 3/37 (4 overs)		DJ Bell-Drummond 90* (55); SR Harmer 2/21 (4 overs)	County Cricket Ground, Beckenham; Umpires: RA Kettleborough and AG Wharf; Player of the match: DJ Bell-Drummond (Kent)
Essex won the toss and elected to bat; Points: Kent 2, Essex 0 JDS Neesham made his Kent debut				County Cricket Ground, Beckenham; Umpires: RA Kettleborough and AG Wharf; Player of the match: DJ Bell-Drummond (Kent)

13 July	Kent; 152/8 (20 overs)	v	(H) Gloucestershire; 156/4 (19.1 overs)	Gloucestershire won by 6 wickets (with 5 balls remaining)
Scorecard	Kent; 152/8 (20 overs)	v	(H) Gloucestershire; 156/4 (19.1 overs)	College Ground, Cheltenham; Umpires: RJ Evans and RT Robinson; Player of the match: BAC Howell (Gloucestershire)
Scorecard	JL Denly 39 (24); BAC Howell 4/29 (4 overs)		P Mustard 42 (26); AF Milne 2/28 (4 overs)	College Ground, Cheltenham; Umpires: RJ Evans and RT Robinson; Player of the match: BAC Howell (Gloucestershire)
Gloucestershire won the toss and elected to field; Points: Gloucestershire 2, Kent 0 Imran Qayyum made his Twenty20 debut				College Ground, Cheltenham; Umpires: RJ Evans and RT Robinson; Player of the match: BAC Howell (Gloucestershire)

14 July	Surrey (H); 205/5 (20 overs)	v	Kent; 207/2 (19.3 overs)	Kent won by 8 wickets (with 3 balls remaining)
Scorecard	Surrey (H); 205/5 (20 overs)	v	Kent; 207/2 (19.3 overs)	The Oval, London; Umpires: RK Illingworth and JW Lloyds; Player of the match: JL Denly (Kent)
Scorecard	JJ Roy 55 (30); AF Milne 2/33 (4 overs)		JL Denly 116* (63); JW Dernbach 2/30 (4 overs)	The Oval, London; Umpires: RK Illingworth and JW Lloyds; Player of the match: JL Denly (Kent)
Kent won the toss and elected to field; Points: Surrey 0, Kent 2				The Oval, London; Umpires: RK Illingworth and JW Lloyds; Player of the match: JL Denly (Kent)

18 July	Gloucestershire; 138/9 (20 overs)	v	(H) Kent; 130 (20 overs)	Gloucestershire won by 8 runs
Scorecard	Gloucestershire; 138/9 (20 overs)	v	(H) Kent; 130 (20 overs)	St Lawrence Ground, Canterbury; Umpires: NGB Cook and DJ Millns; Player of the match: BAC Howell (Gloucestershire)
Scorecard	IA Cockbain 40 (32); Imran Qayyum 2/19 (4 overs)		DJ Bell-Drummond 25 (18); TMJ Smith 3/28 (4 overs)	St Lawrence Ground, Canterbury; Umpires: NGB Cook and DJ Millns; Player of the match: BAC Howell (Gloucestershire)
Kent won the toss and elected to field; Points: Kent 0, Gloucestershire 2				St Lawrence Ground, Canterbury; Umpires: NGB Cook and DJ Millns; Player of the match: BAC Howell (Gloucestershire)

20 July	Middlesex (H); 179/8 (20 overs)	v	Kent; 163/8 (20 overs)	Middlesex won by 16 runs
Scorecard	Middlesex (H); 179/8 (20 overs)	v	Kent; 163/8 (20 overs)	Old Deer Park, Richmond; Umpires: M Burns and NGB Cook; Player of the match: BB McCullum (Middlesex)
Scorecard	BB McCullum 88 (51); MT Coles 4/32 (4 overs)		SA Northeast 59 (43); RF Higgins 2/22 (3 overs)	Old Deer Park, Richmond; Umpires: M Burns and NGB Cook; Player of the match: BB McCullum (Middlesex)
Kent won the toss and elected to field; Points: Middlesex 2, Kent 0				Old Deer Park, Richmond; Umpires: M Burns and NGB Cook; Player of the match: BB McCullum (Middlesex)

23 July	Kent; 176/4	v	Sussex (H); 87/3 (8 overs)	Match tied (D/L method)
Scorecard	Kent; 176/4	v	Sussex (H); 87/3 (8 overs)	County Cricket Ground, Hove; Umpires: PJ Hartley and PR Pollard
Scorecard	SW Billings 64 (42); TS Mills 1/26; JC Archer 1/26		CD Nash 50 (25); CJ Haggett 1/8 (1 over)	County Cricket Ground, Hove; Umpires: PJ Hartley and PR Pollard
Sussex won the toss and elected to field; Sussex's innings was reduced to 8 overs following rain, with a target of 88 runs for victory set using the Duckworth–Lewis method; Points: Kent 1, Sussex 1				County Cricket Ground, Hove; Umpires: PJ Hartley and PR Pollard

27 July	Somerset; 197/6 (20 overs)	v	(H) Kent; 181/3 (16.3 overs)	Kent won by 7 wickets (with 9 balls remaining) (D/L method)
Scorecard	Somerset; 197/6 (20 overs)	v	(H) Kent; 181/3 (16.3 overs)	St Lawrence Ground, Canterbury; Umpires: NL Bainton and RJ Bailey; Player of the match: SA Northeast (Kent)
Scorecard	JG Myburgh 64 (35); JL Denly 1/16 (2 overs)		SA Northeast 54* (27); MTC Waller 2/33 (4 overs)	St Lawrence Ground, Canterbury; Umpires: NL Bainton and RJ Bailey; Player of the match: SA Northeast (Kent)
Somerset won the toss and elected to bat; Rain stopped play after 6 overs of Kent's innings with the score at 77/0; after the resumption, a revised D/L target of 181 to win from 18 overs was set; Points: Kent 2, Somerset 0				St Lawrence Ground, Canterbury; Umpires: NL Bainton and RJ Bailey; Player of the match: SA Northeast (Kent)

30 July	Kent (H); 199/2 (20 overs)	v	Glamorgan; 174/4 (20 overs)	Glamorgan won by 25 runs
Scorecard	Kent (H); 199/2 (20 overs)	v	Glamorgan; 174/4 (20 overs)	St Lawrence Ground, Canterbury; Umpires: RJ Bailey and DJ Millns; Player of the match: JA Rudolph (Glamorgan)
Scorecard	JA Rudolph 77* (52); MT Coles 1/29 (3 overs)		JL Denly 68 (50); CAJ Meschede 1/12 (2 overs)	St Lawrence Ground, Canterbury; Umpires: RJ Bailey and DJ Millns; Player of the match: JA Rudolph (Glamorgan)
Kent won the toss and elected to field; Points: Kent 0, Glamorgan 2				St Lawrence Ground, Canterbury; Umpires: RJ Bailey and DJ Millns; Player of the match: JA Rudolph (Glamorgan)

1 August	Kent; 159/6 (20 overs)	v	(H) Hampshire; 154/4 (20 overs)	Kent won by 5 runs
Scorecard	Kent; 159/6 (20 overs)	v	(H) Hampshire; 154/4 (20 overs)	Rose Bowl, Southampton; Umpires: SJ O'Shaughnessy and BV Taylor; Player of the match: DJ Bell-Drummond (Kent)
Scorecard	DJ Bell-Drummond 62 (42); Shahid Afridi 4/26 (4 overs)		TP Alsop 43* (41); JDS Neesham 1/22 (3 overs)	Rose Bowl, Southampton; Umpires: SJ O'Shaughnessy and BV Taylor; Player of the match: DJ Bell-Drummond (Kent)
Kent won the toss and elected to field; Points: Hampshire 0, Kent 2				Rose Bowl, Southampton; Umpires: SJ O'Shaughnessy and BV Taylor; Player of the match: DJ Bell-Drummond (Kent)

4 August	Kent (H); 163/9 (20 overs)	v	Sussex; 167/5 (19 overs)	Sussex won by 5 wickets (with 6 balls remaining)
Scorecard	Kent (H); 163/9 (20 overs)	v	Sussex; 167/5 (19 overs)	St Lawrence Ground, Canterbury; Umpires: NGC Cowley and MA Gough; Player of the match: CD Nash (Sussex)
Scorecard	SW Billings 74 (40); CJ Jordan 3/38 (4 overs)		CD Nash 73* (58); DI Stevens 2/25 (3 overs)	St Lawrence Ground, Canterbury; Umpires: NGC Cowley and MA Gough; Player of the match: CD Nash (Sussex)
Kent won the toss and elected to bat; Points: Kent 0, Sussex 2				St Lawrence Ground, Canterbury; Umpires: NGC Cowley and MA Gough; Player of the match: CD Nash (Sussex)

11 August	Kent (H); 167/7 (20 overs)	v	Hampshire; 171/4 (17.2 overs)	Hampshire won by 6 wickets (with 16 balls remaining)
Scorecard	Kent (H); 167/7 (20 overs)	v	Hampshire; 171/4 (17.2 overs)	St Lawrence Ground, Canterbury; Umpires: PK Baldwin and RT Robinson; Player of the match: CM Dickinson (Hampshire)
Scorecard	SA Northeast 59 (42); KJ Abbott 2/15 (4 overs); LA Dawson 2/15 (4 overs)		JM Vince 57 (36); ME Claydon 2/33 (3 overs)	St Lawrence Ground, Canterbury; Umpires: PK Baldwin and RT Robinson; Player of the match: CM Dickinson (Hampshire)
Hampshire won the toss and elected to field; Kent 0, Hampshire 2				St Lawrence Ground, Canterbury; Umpires: PK Baldwin and RT Robinson; Player of the match: CM Dickinson (Hampshire)

12 August	Somerset (H); 149 (18.5 overs)	v	Kent; 151/4 (18.2 overs)	Kent won by 6 wickets (with 10 balls remaining)
Scorecard	Somerset (H); 149 (18.5 overs)	v	Kent; 151/4 (18.2 overs)	County Ground, Taunton; Umpires: NGB Cook and JW Lloyds; Player of the match: AF Milne (Kent)
Scorecard	JC Hildreth 36 (30); AF Milne 5/11 (3.5 overs)		SW Billings 56* (36); L Gregory 1/15 (2 overs)	County Ground, Taunton; Umpires: NGB Cook and JW Lloyds; Player of the match: AF Milne (Kent)
Kent won the toss and elected to field; Points: Somerset 0, Kent 2 AF Milne set a new Kent record for best bowling figures in an innings with 5/11.				County Ground, Taunton; Umpires: NGB Cook and JW Lloyds; Player of the match: AF Milne (Kent)

17 August	Kent; 221/2 (20 overs)	v	(H) Essex; 210/5 (20 overs)	Kent won by 11 runs
Scorecard	Kent; 221/2 (20 overs)	v	(H) Essex; 210/5 (20 overs)	County Ground, Chelmsford; Umpires: JH Evans and NA Mallender; Player of the match: JL Denly (Kent)
Scorecard	JL Denly 127 (66); Mohammad Amir 1/20 (4 overs)		V Chopra 116 (59); CJ Haggett 1/18 (4 overs)	County Ground, Chelmsford; Umpires: JH Evans and NA Mallender; Player of the match: JL Denly (Kent)
Essex won the toss and elected to field; Points: Essex 0, Kent 2 JL Denly's 127 was his highest score in T20 cricket The opening partnerships between JL Denly and DJ Bell-Drummond (207 from 18.3 overs) was the highest for any wicket in T20 cricket in the UK and the third highest anywhere in the world (and was a world record for the first wicket)				County Ground, Chelmsford; Umpires: JH Evans and NA Mallender; Player of the match: JL Denly (Kent)

18 August	Surrey; 154/9 (20 overs)	v	(H) Kent; 144/8 (20 overs)	Surrey win by 10 runs
Scorecard	Surrey; 154/9 (20 overs)	v	(H) Kent; 144/8 (20 overs)	St Lawrence Ground, Canterbury; Umpires: M Burns and SC Gale; Player of the match: JJ Roy (Surrey)
Scorecard	JJ Roy 78 (43); AF Milne 3/26 (4 overs)		JL Denly 40 (38); R Clarke 4/16 (4 overs)	St Lawrence Ground, Canterbury; Umpires: M Burns and SC Gale; Player of the match: JJ Roy (Surrey)
Surrey won the toss and elected to bat; Points: Kent 0, Surrey 2				St Lawrence Ground, Canterbury; Umpires: M Burns and SC Gale; Player of the match: JJ Roy (Surrey)
