= James Harris (cricketer, born 1990) =

Welsh cricketer (born 1990)

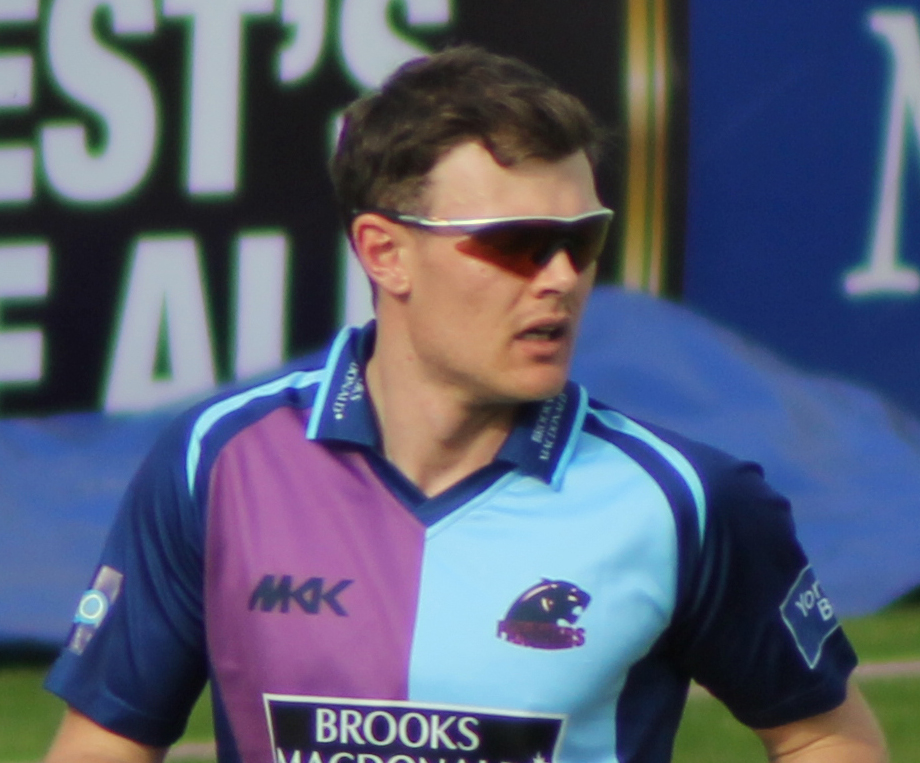

Personal information
- Full name: James Alexander Russell Harris
- Born: 16 May 1990 (age 36); Morriston, Wales
- Nickname: Rolf, Bones
- Height: 6 ft 0 in (1.83 m)
- Batting: Right-handed
- Bowling: Right-arm medium-fast
- Role: Bowler

Domestic team information
- Years: Team
- 2007–2012: Glamorgan (squad no. 9)
- 2013–2021: Middlesex (squad no. 5)
- 2014: → Glamorgan (on loan)
- 2017: → Kent (on loan)
- 2021: → Glamorgan (on loan)
- 2022–2025: Glamorgan (squad no. 9)
- FC debut: 2 May 2007 Glamorgan v Nottinghamshire
- LA debut: 10 June 2007 Glamorgan v Gloucestershire

Career statistics
Competition	FC	LA	T20
Matches	196	75	60
Runs scored	4,689	479	168
Batting average	21.70	13.30	10.50
100s/50s	0/19	1/0	0/0
Top score	87*	117	18
Balls bowled	33,298	3,278	1,060
Wickets	623	101	48
Bowling average	30.59	31.72	34.41
5 wickets in innings	17	0	0
10 wickets in match	2	0	0
Best bowling	9/34	4/38	4/23
Catches/stumpings	50/–	15/–	8/–
- Source: ESPNcricinfo, 26 September 2025

James Alexander Russell Harris (born 16 May 1990) is a Welsh former professional cricketer who was born at Morriston, (a Swansea suburb) in South Wales. He was a right arm fast bowler and right-handed batsman who represented Glamorgan and Middlesex.

== Career ==
Harris was the youngest person ever to play for Glamorgan 2nd XI, aged 14 years and 353 days and the youngest person to have played for Wales Minor Counties, when he took 3/48 against the Netherlands. In 2006 he captained England Under-16s team and at the age of 15 signed up for Glamorgan.

He made his first class debut in 2007, at the age of 17. Against Gloucestershire, he finished with figures of 12–118, meaning he became the youngest player ever to take 10 or more wickets in a County Championship match, taking 5–52 in the second innings to follow up his first-innings 7–66.

Harris rapidly followed this up by becoming the youngest Glamorgan player to score a half century with the bat as he posted an impressive 87 not out in a record 9th wicket partnership of 185 with Robert Croft against Nottinghamshire at Swansea, in only his fourth first class match.

On 28 April 2010 he became the youngest Glamorgan player to take 100 first class wickets for the county when he claimed the wicket of Phil Jaques in the victory against Worcestershire.

On 31 August 2012, Glamorgan confirmed that Harris had turned down the offer of a substantial new contract, and having taken an option in his existing contract, would be leaving the county at the end of the 2012 domestic season. On 24 September 2012, Harris joined Middlesex on a three-year deal.

Harris took 69 County Championship wickets in the 2015 season and signed a new contract with Middlesex in May 2015. After playing in seven Championship matches during the 2016 season and taking 16 wickets, Harris joined Kent on loan for the early stages of the 2017 season. He made his debut for the county in their opening County Championship match of 2017 against Gloucestershire at Canterbury in April.

He announced his return to Glamorgan for the 2022 season.

In 2021, Harris was elected as chair of the Professional Cricketers' Association and was re-elected for a second term two years later.

He signed a new two-year contract with Glamorgan in October 2024.

Harris announced his retirement from professional cricket on 23 March 2026, ending his 19-year career with 772 wickets across all formats including 623 at an average of 30.59 in first-class matches.
