= Sean Dickson =

English-South African cricketer

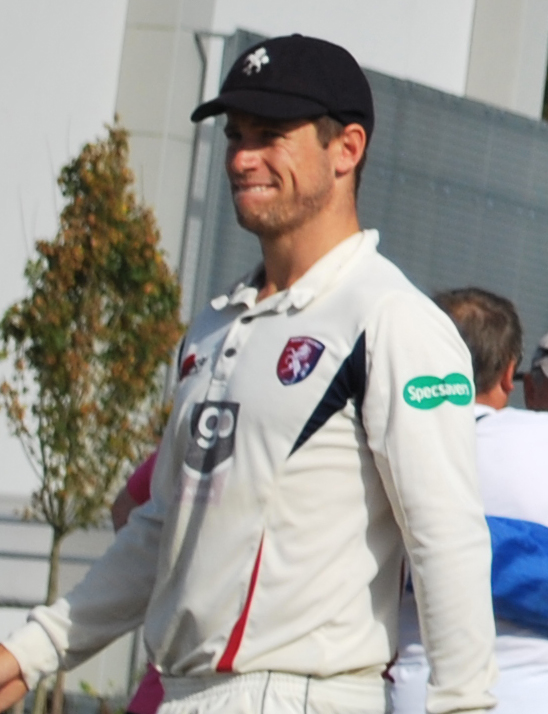
- Dickson at Beckenham in 2016

Personal information
- Full name: Sean Robert Dickson
- Born: 2 September 1991 (age 35); Johannesburg, Transvaal, South Africa
- Batting: Right-handed
- Bowling: Right-arm medium
- Role: Batter

Domestic team information
- Years: Team
- 2013/14–2014/15: Northerns
- 2015–2019: Kent (squad no. 58)
- 2020: → Durham (loan)
- 2021–2022: Durham (squad no. 58)
- 2023–2025: Somerset (squad no. 58)
- 2025: London Spirit (squad no. 58)
- 2025/26: Gulf Giants
- 2026–: Glamorgan (squad no. 58)
- 2026: Birmingham Phoenix (squad no. 58)
- FC debut: 14 November 2013 Northerns v Border
- LA debut: 17 November 2013 Northerns v Border

Career statistics
Competition	FC	LA	T20
Matches	121	75	103
Runs scored	5,955	1,900	2,131
Batting average	31.34	31.14	33.29
100s/50s	14/25	1/12	0/13
Top score	318	103*	78
Balls bowled	99	12	6
Wickets	2	0	1
Bowling average	27.00	–	9.00
5 wickets in innings	0	–	0
10 wickets in match	0	–	0
Best bowling	1/15	–	1/9
Catches/stumpings	81/–	26/–	53/–
- Source: ESPNcricinfo, 10 September 2026

Sean Robert Dickson (born 2 September 1991) is an English-South African cricketer who plays as a right-handed top-order batter. Dickson was born in Johannesburg and made his first-class debut in South Africa before signing for Kent in July 2015, qualifying as a non-overseas player due to his British mother and UK passport. Dickson scored 318 for Kent in July 2017, the county's second highest individual score and making him one of only two men to have made a triple-century for Kent.

In July 2020, Dickson joined Durham, initially on loan before a permanent move to the county in November 2020. He had declined a contract extension at Kent. In September 2022, it was announced that Dickson would join Somerset ahead of the 2023 season.

== Cricket career ==
Dickson played cricket for Pretoria University before being called into the Northerns team in November 2013, making his first-class cricket debut against Border. He scored his maiden first-class century for Northerns in a CSA Provincial match against North West at Potchefstroom in March 2014, before being dismissed for 173. Dickson played a total of nine first-class matches for Northerns in the 2013/14 and 2014/15 seasons, as well as representing the club in List A cricket and Twenty20 cricket in CSA Provincial competitions.

At the beginning of the 2015 English cricket season Dickson moved to England, playing in the East Anglian Premier Cricket League for Woolpit in Suffolk. He played in a trial match for Kent in May, having previously had a trial with Somerset in 2010 while playing club cricket for Clevedon Cricket Club. Seven centuries in Second XI matches for Kent in 2015 saw Dickson sign a contract with the county in July. He made his senior debut against Warwickshire in the 2015 Royal London One-Day Cup in August 2015, before making his County Championship debut later in the same month against Derbyshire. He was awarded the 2nd XI National Player of the Year Award for 2015.

Dickson started the 2016 season opening the batting for Kent but became the 60th batsman in first-class cricket history to be dismissed handled the ball in the county's first Championship innings of the year against Leicestershire at Grace Road. He scored his second century – a maiden double century – for Kent in the 2016 County Championship against Derbyshire at Derby in May 2016, where he finished on 207 not out in their first innings.

Dickson signed a long-term contract extension with Kent in August 2016, having won a consistent place in the County Championship team for the county during the season. He played rarely in limited overs matches for the county during 2016, although he did score 99 in his only 2016 Royal London One-Day Cup appearance, his new highest List A score. He was named as the Kent Supporters Club most promising uncapped player of the season in January 2017.

In July 2017, Dickson made a score of 318 for Kent against Northants at Beckenham in the County Championship. The innings was Kent's second-highest individual score in first-class cricket and the third triple-century scored for the county. Dickson batted for over eight hours and faced 408 balls. Batting with Joe Denly, he contributed to what was, at the time, Kent's highest partnership for any wicket, putting on 382 runs for the second wicket. Later in the season he made his fourth first-class century, scoring 142 against the touring West Indies team at Canterbury in August. He ended the season having scored 982 first-class runs.

During the 2017/18 close season Dickson played in the US T20 Open tournament in Florida, playing for the US Tigers. In 2018 he scored three first-class centuries for Kent and featured in all formats of the game for the county. He signed a contract extension in November 2018 and played for Kent throughout 2019 before leaving the club to join Durham on loan in July 2020.

In September 2025 it was announced that Dickson had agreed to join Glamorgan for the 2026 season.
