= Hugh Bernard =

English cricketer

Personal information
- Full name: Hugh Robert Bernard
- Born: 14 September 1996 (age 30); Canterbury, Kent
- Height: 5 ft 11 in (1.80 m)
- Batting: Right-handed
- Bowling: Right-arm medium-fast
- Role: Bowler

Domestic team information
- Years: Team
- 2015–2017: Kent (squad no. 27)
- First-class debut: 1 May 2016 Kent v Glamorgan
- LA debut: 25 January 2017 Kent v Leeward Islands

Career statistics
Competition	First-class	List A
Matches	1	2
Runs scored	14	7
Batting average	14.00	7.00
100s/50s	0/0	0/0
Top score	14	7
Balls bowled	132	96
Wickets	3	1
Bowling average	35.00	90.00
5 wickets in innings	0	0
10 wickets in match	0	0
Best bowling	2/68	1/40
Catches/stumpings	0/–	0/–
- Source: CricInfo, 11 February 2017

Hugh Robert Bernard (born 14 September 1996) is an English former professional cricketer who has played for Kent County Cricket Club. He is a right-arm medium-fast pace bowler and a right-handed batsman. Bernard is a graduate of the Kent Cricket Academy and has featured in Kent's Second XI since 2014 as well as playing club cricket for Folkestone. In June 2015, Bernard signed his first professional contract with Kent. He made his first-class debut on 1 May 2016 against Glamorgan.

Bernard was born in Canterbury and attended Archbishop's School in the city.

== Youth international career ==
Bernard made his Youth One Day International debut for England Under-19s during a tour of Australia in April 2015, appearing twice and taking 5/14 in the final match of the series in Perth. In August 2015 he appeared four time for England under-19s as Australia Under-19s toured England. During December 2015 Bernard again played for the team in the 2015 Sri Lanka Under-19 Tri-Nation tournament before appearing twice for England against the touring Sri Lanka under-19s in August 2016.

== Domestic cricket career ==
Bernard made his senior first-class debut for Kent in May 2016, appearing against Glamorgan at Canterbury. He claimed his maiden first-class wicket in the Glamorgan first innings, having Aneurin Donald caught at deep square leg, taking three wickets in the match and becoming the 17th member of the Kent Academy to progress to senior cricket. He made his List A debut for Kent on 25 January 2017 against the Leeward Islands in the 2016–17 Regional Super50 tournament in Antigua.

Bernard was released by Kent at the end of the 2017 season.
