= Lee Rushworth =

English cricketer

Personal information
- Full name: Lee Joseph Rushworth
- Born: 18 June 1982 (age 44); Sunderland, Tyne and Wear, England
- Batting: Right-handed
- Relatives: Chris Rushworth (brother); Phil Mustard (cousin)

Domestic team information
- Years: Team
- 2001: Durham Cricket Board

Career statistics
Competition	LA
Matches	1
Runs scored	12
Batting average	12.00
100s/50s	–/–
Top score	12
Balls bowled	18
Wickets	–
Bowling average	–
5 wickets in innings	–
10 wickets in match	–
Best bowling	–
Catches/stumpings	–/–
- Source: Cricinfo, 6 November 2010

Lee Joseph Rushworth (born 18 June 1982) is an English cricketer. Rushworth is a right-handed batsman. He was born in Sunderland, Tyne and Wear.

Rushworth represented the Durham Cricket Board in a single List A match against Hertfordshire in the 2001 Cheltenham & Gloucester Trophy. In his only List A match, he scored 12 runs.
