= The Archbishop's School =

Coordinates: 51°17′35″N 1°4′27″E

Location
- St Stephens Hill; Canterbury, Kent, CT2 7AP; England

Information
- Type: Foundation school
- Motto: Enter to Learn, Go Forth to Serve
- Religious affiliation: Church of England
- Established: 1958
- Local authority: Kent County Council
- Department for Education URN: 118898 Tables
- Ofsted: Reports
- Headteacher: David Elliott
- Gender: Coeducational
- Age: 11 to 19
- Houses: Mark, Matthew, Luke, John
- Website: https://www.archbishops-school.co.uk/

The Archbishop's School is a mixed-ability Church of England secondary school and sixth form located on a parkland site on the outskirts of Canterbury, Kent, England. It is a school for pupils and students of all abilities from the ages of 11 to 19, and has approximately 850 pupils. The school was founded in 1958.

The Archbishop's School is situated on St Stephens's Hill, in the village of Hackington (not to be confused with the civil parish of the same name), approximately a mile North-West of the city centre. The Rector of Hackington (St Stephen's) is an ex officio Governor of the school, and since 2014 has also held the office of school chaplain (prior to 2014 this was a separate appointment).

It has six houses named Matthew, Mark, Luke, and John, after the four Evangelists, and two others, Paul and Peter, named after the apostles of those names.

The bricked-up southern portal of Tyler Hill tunnel, part of the former Canterbury and Whitstable Railway, lies within the grounds of the school.

== Learning Support/Student Support ==
The school has a special VI (Visual Impairment) team with equipment catered to the student such as a Braille typewriter. It also has students with SpLDs (Specific Learning Difficulties) such as Dyslexia, Autism, and ADHD.

== Notable Former Pupils ==
Hugh Bernard - English cricketer
