= Charlie Hartley (Kent cricketer) =

English cricketer (born 1994)

Personal information
- Full name: Charles Frederick Hartley
- Born: 4 January 1994 (age 32); Redditch, Worcestershire
- Height: 6 ft 2 in (1.88 m)
- Batting: Right-handed
- Bowling: Right-arm medium-fast

Domestic team information
- Years: Team
- 2014–2017: Kent (squad no. 22)
- FC debut: 7 July 2014 Kent v Leicestershire
- LA debut: 16 May 2014 Kent v Sri Lankans

Career statistics
Competition	First-class	List A
Matches	3	8
Runs scored	7	30
Batting average	1.75	6.00
100s/50s	0/0	0/0
Top score	5	15
Balls bowled	464	384
Wickets	11	9
Bowling average	28.54	40.77
5 wickets in innings	0	0
10 wickets in match	0	0
Best bowling	4/80	2/23
Catches/stumpings	0/–	0/–
- Source: CricInfo, 2 October 2017

Charles Frederick Hartley (born 4 January 1994), known as Charlie Hartley, is an English former professional cricketer who played for Kent County Cricket Club. He is a right-arm swing bowler who bats right-handed. He made his First-class cricket debut for Kent against Leicestershire in July 2014.

Hartley was born in Redditch in Worcestershire and attended Millfield School where he played in the cricket First XI. Having played for Worcestershire and Somerset youth teams and appearing for the Kent Second XI during the 2013 season, he signed a professional contract with the club in September 2013. His initial trial with Kent was arranged by former Kent and England bowler Richard Ellison who taught at Millfield.

Hartley played four times for Kent during the 2014 season, twice in first-class matches and twice in List A matches against Sri Lanka and New Zealand A. He made two List A appearances in the 2016 Royal London One-Day Cup, returning his best bowling figures in List A cricket of 2/26 against Gloucestershire and was rewarded with a one-year contract extension at the end of the 2016 season. He has continued to play for Kent in Second XI matches as well as playing for Canterbury Cricket Club, Bromley Cricket Club and Dartford Cricket Club in the Kent Cricket League and playing grade cricket in New South Wales for Newcastle City.

Hartley played club cricket for Durbanville in the Western Province Cricket Association in South Africa during the 2016–17 English winter. He injured a shoulder whilst fielding for the club and, as a result, missed Kent's matches in the 2016–17 Regional Super50 competition in the Caribbean during January and February 2017. After rehabilitation work on the injury he travelled to Tanzania to play for St Gobain Strikers in the Advanced Players League T20 competition, part of a group of 12 overseas players brought in to strengthen the competition.

Hartley played his third first-class match for Kent, his first since 2014, against the touring West Indians on 6 August 2017 during the 166th Canterbury Cricket Week. He took 4/80 in the first innings and a total of 6 wickets in the drawn match as the tourists struggled against a young Kent bowling attack.

At the end of the 2017 season Hartley was released by Kent. He has since developed an educational mobile app and a website which aims to connect young cricketers with professional mentors.
