= Adam Ball =

English cricketer

Personal information
- Full name: Adam James Ball
- Born: 1 March 1993 (age 33); Greenwich, London
- Batting: Right-handed
- Bowling: Left-arm fast-medium

Domestic team information
- Years: Team
- 2010–2017: Kent (squad no. 24)
- 2018: Suffolk
- FC debut: 26 April 2011 Kent v Gloucestershire
- Last FC: 6 August 2017 Kent v West Indians
- LA debut: 4 September 2010 Kent v Durham
- Last LA: 27 May 2017 Kent v Essex

Career statistics
Competition	FC	LA	T20
Matches	31	32	38
Runs scored	855	232	142
Batting average	20.35	15.46	11.83
100s/50s	0/4	0/0	0/0
Top score	69	40*	18
Balls bowled	2,268	933	588
Wickets	34	22	27
Bowling average	44.05	39.40	30.00
5 wickets in innings	0	0	0
10 wickets in match	0	0	0
Best bowling	3/36	3/36	2/18
Catches/stumpings	20/–	10/–	22/–
- Source: CricInfo, 2 October 2017

Adam James Ball (born 1 March 1993) is an English cricketer who plays for Suffolk County Cricket Club. Ball is a batting allrounder who played top level cricket for Kent County Cricket Club from 2010 until 2017 and was captain of the England Under-19 cricket team.

== Early life and education ==
Ball was born in Greenwich in south-east London. He was educated at Beths Grammar School in Bexley and at the University of Kent where he studied Sports Science. He was a member of the Kent Cricket Academy and won a sponsorship to study at the university whilst a member of the county squad. As a child, Ball was a "promising footballer" who played for Arsenal in under-9 to under-12 age group teams.

== Cricket career ==
Ball grew up playing for Bexley Cricket Club in the Kent Cricket League. He was called in to the England under-19 squad in December 2009 as a 16 year old and made his debut in January 2010 against Afghanistan Under-19s in the 2010 Under-19 World Cup. He signed his first professional contract with Kent in February of the same year, still only 16.

His senior Kent debut came later in 2010 against Durham in the 2010 Clydesdale Bank 40 and was followed by his first-class cricket debut the following season against Gloucestershire.

Ball played for England under-19s until 2012, captaining the team in the 2012 Under-19 World Cup in Australia. After an immediate impact in Kent's limited overs teams he later found opportunities to play for Kent "limited". He was released by Kent at the end of the 2017 season, joining Suffolk County Cricket Club as a professional player in March 2018. Ball played for Copdock and Old Ipswichian in the East Anglian Premier Cricket League during the season, but his work commitments meant that he was unable to play as frequently as required and he was not re-engaged as a professional by the county in 2019.
