= Adam Rouse =

English cricketer (born 1992)

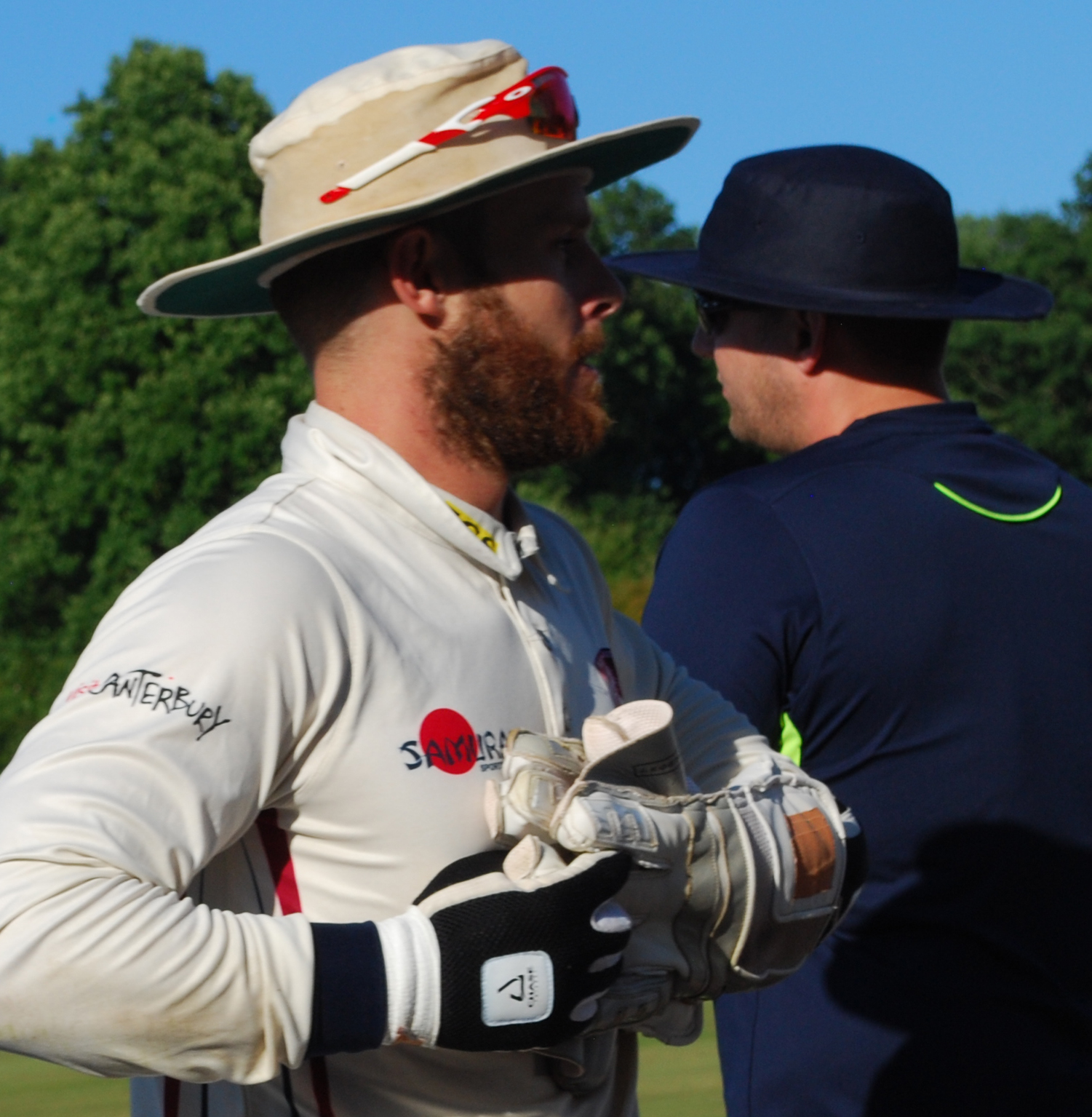
- Rouse at Tunbridge Wells in June 2018

Personal information
- Full name: Adam Paul Rouse
- Born: 30 June 1992 (age 34); Harare, Zimbabwe
- Height: 5 ft 10 in (1.78 m)
- Batting: Right-handed
- Bowling: Right-arm off break
- Role: Wicket-keeper

Domestic team information
- Years: Team
- 2013: Hampshire (squad no. 20)
- 2014: Gloucestershire
- 2016–2019: Kent (squad no. 12)
- FC debut: 15 July 2013 Hampshire v Kent
- LA debut: 6 August 2013 Hampshire v Bangladesh A

Career statistics
Competition	FC	LA	T20
Matches	36	40	8
Runs scored	1,103	682	61
Batting average	23.46	27.28	12.20
100s/50s	0/5	0/3	0/0
Top score	95*	75*	35*
Catches/stumpings	112/4	37/3	4/4
- Source: CricInfo, 30 July 2020

Adam Paul Rouse (born 30 June 1992) is a Zimbabwean-born English former professional cricketer. Rouse played as a right-handed batsman who fielded as a wicket-keeper, although he was considered versatile enough to play solely as a specialist batsman. Rouse played for England at under-19 level and made his first-class debut in 2013 for Hampshire County Cricket Club. He played for Gloucestershire in 2014 before joining Kent County Cricket Club ahead of the 2016 season. He retired from professional cricket at the start of the 2020 season.

== Early life and youth career ==
Born in the Zimbabwean capital Harare, Rouse moved to England with his family when he was ten years old, living at Farleigh Wallop near Basingstoke. Two years later, he became the youngest person to make a century in an adult league match at the age of twelve. Impressing during his teens in club cricket, Rouse was talent spotted by Hampshire, entering the county's academy and first playing for their second XI in 2008.

In 2010, Rouse played two Youth Test matches and five Youth One Day Internationals for the England Under-19 team against Sri Lanka Under-19s. In 2011 he became the youngest English substitute fielder to take a catch during a Test match. Later in the year Rouse had his development contract renewed. He captained the Hampshire Second XI for the majority of the 2012 season.

== Cricket career ==
Rouse made his First Class cricket debut for Hampshire in 2013 against Kent, also appearing once for the county in a one-day game against the touring Bangladesh A team. He was released by the club at the end of the 2013 season, joining Gloucestershire for a two-month spell in 2014. Rouse played in 13 matches for Gloucestershire in all domestic competitions before being released when first choice wicket keeper Gareth Roderick returned from injury. He also featured for Surrey and Kent's second eleven teams during the season. Following his release by Gloucestershire, Rouse qualified as a personal trainer, a move he later suggested had allowed him to play cricket "with a bit more freedom" and provided a "plan-B".

At the beginning of the 2015 season he acted as temporary wicket keeper cover for Kent but was not signed to a longer-term contract. In January 2016, following Ryan Davies' departure to Somerset, Rouse signed a two-year permanent contract with Kent. He made his Kent first-class debut in a university match in April 2016, replacing Sam Billings who was playing in the 2016 Indian Premier League.

Rouse became Kent's regular wicket-keeper in Billings absence at the start of the 2016 season and by the end of May was leading the first-class wicket-keeping dismissals with 26 victims. Once Billings returned to Kent Rouse became the reserve 'keeper, although he continued to play when Billings was injured or on England duty, making eight appearances for Kent during the season. His season was cut short following two finger dislocations during Kent's County Championship match against Glamorgan towards the end of June, a game in which Rouse made his maiden first-class half century. A fracture resulting from the injuries required surgery which sidelined Rouse for ten weeks and he did not play for the first team for the remainder of the 2016 season.

With Billings once again on England duty and playing in the 2017 Pakistan Super League, Rouse began Kent's 2017 season as the first-choice wicket-keeper, playing in all of the county's matches in the 2016–17 Regional Super50 tournament in the West Indies and topping the team's batting averages in the competition. He scored his maiden List A half-century in the team's final match of the tournament playing as a specialist batsman. Rouse continued to keep wicket at the start of the 2017 County Championship season, taking 13 catches and making a new first-class highest score of 95 not out in the first block of matches before signing a new contract with Kent in late April. He played in Billings' absences for Kent throughout 2017 and again in 2018, playing occasionally as wicket-keeper in games Billings also played in, and made one first-class appearance for Surrey in July 2018 in a tour match against West Indies A with Surrey suffering from a shortage of available wicket-keepers.

== Retirement ==
Rouse retired from professional cricket in July 2020, at the start of the 2020 season which had been delayed due to the COVID-19 pandemic, having made 84 senior appearances in his career. In 2021, supported by the Professional Cricketers Association, he opened a gym in central London with his wife, building on his personal training qualifications.

== External list ==
- Adam Rouse at Cricinfo
