= Will Gidman =

English cricketer (born 1985)

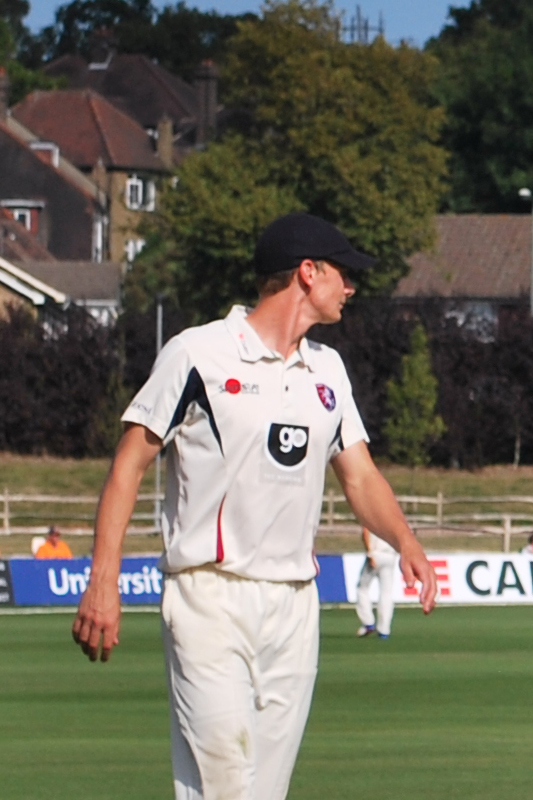
- Gidman fielding whilst playing for Kent at Beckenham in 2016

Personal information
- Full name: William Robert Simon Gidman
- Born: 14 February 1985 (age 41); High Wycombe, Buckinghamshire
- Nickname: Gidders, Giddo
- Height: 6 ft 2 in (1.88 m)
- Batting: Left-handed
- Bowling: Right-arm medium
- Role: All-rounder

Domestic team information
- Years: Team
- 2002: Gloucestershire Cricket Board
- 2007–2010: Durham
- 2011–2014: Gloucestershire (squad no. 23)
- 2015–2016: Nottinghamshire (squad no. 24)
- 2016: → Kent (on loan)
- 2017–2018: Kent
- FC debut: 8 August 2007 Durham v Sri Lanka A
- LA debut: 29 August 2002; Gloucestershire Cricket Board v Surrey Cricket Board

Career statistics
Competition	FC	LA	T20
Matches	83	66	15
Runs scored	3,673	945	186
Batting average	35.31	24.86	23.25
100s/50s	5/21	0/4	0/0
Top score	143	94	40*
Balls bowled	10,609	2,411	156
Wickets	219	61	6
Bowling average	23.54	29.72	38.00
5 wickets in innings	10	0	0
10 wickets in match	1	0	0
Best bowling	6/15	4/20	2/23
Catches/stumpings	38/–	18/–	3/–
- Source: CricInfo, 6 May 2018

William Robert Simon Gidman (born 14 February 1985) is an English former professional cricketer who most recently played for Kent County Cricket Club as an all-rounder. He previously played county cricket for Durham, Gloucestershire and Nottinghamshire and spent a period on loan at Kent towards the end of the 2016 season before joining the club permanently in October 2016.

Gidman began his career with Gloucestershire before signing for Durham in 2006. He made his first-class cricket debut against Sri Lanka A in 2007, but did not play another first-class match again until 2010, which prompted a move away from the north-east.

After the 2010 season he signed for Gloucestershire, captained by his elder brother Alex. In his first season with the county he achieved a County Championship double of 50 wickets and 1000 runs.

Gidman's career best figures in first-class matches came in the same match for Gloucestershire in September 2013. In the game against Leicestershire at Bristol, he took career best bowling figures of 6/15 on Day 1, and then scored 143 with the bat on Day 2. Gloucestershire went on to win the game be an innings and 138 runs.

In August 2014, Gidman, who would have been out of contract at Gloucestershire at the end of the season and had turned down a new contract with the county, signed a three-year contract with Nottinghamshire.

At the time of the move, Gidman's bowling and batting averages were outstanding, and indicated that he should make the step to the upper division of the County Championship successfully. However, both his batting and bowling fell away at Nottinghamshire and he had trouble justifying his place in the team. In July 2016, having missed the first half of the English season with an ankle injury, Gidman signed a one-month loan deal with Kent. The loan was later extended to the remainder of the season and, following a successful period at the county, Gidman signed a permanent contract with Kent in October 2016 having been released by Nottinghamshire after playing in eight matches for the county in his two years with them. After a "disappointing" 2017 season in which he appeared in 10 first-class matches but averaged less than 20 runs per innings in the County Championship, Gidman signed a contract extension in November 2017. During the 2018 season Gidman's playing opportunities were increasingly limited and he began to move into a coaching role, working with both the First XI and Second XI. During July he announced his retirement from playing cricket at the end of the 2018 season, deputising for Min Patel as Kent's Second XI coach whilst Patel was working with the England under-19 team. Gidman held an ECB Level 3 coaching qualification at the time.

He briefly re-registered as player for a T20 game while a coach at Durham, following an injury crisis.

== Career best performances ==
as of 10 February 2018

	Batting				Bowling (innings)			
	Score	Fixture	Venue	Season	Figures	Fixture	Venue	Season
First-class	143	Gloucestershire v Leicestershire	Bristol	2013	6/15	Gloucestershire v Leicestershire	Bristol	2013
List A	94	Kent v Windward Islands	Coolidge Cricket Ground, Antigua	2016/17	4/20	Kent v Guyana	Coolidge Cricket Ground, Antigua	2017/18
T20	40*	Gloucestershire v Surrey	The Oval	2011	2/23	Gloucestershire v Surrey	Cheltenham	2014
