= 2015 English cricket season =

County Championship
- Champions: Yorkshire
- Runners-up: Middlesex
- Most runs: Ashwell Prince (1478)
- Most wickets: Chris Rushworth (83)

Royal London One-Day Cup
- Champions: Gloucestershire
- Runners-up: Surrey
- Most runs: Michael Klinger (531)
- Most wickets: Reece Topley (20)

NatWest t20 Blast
- Champions: Lancashire Lightning
- Runners-up: Northamptonshire Steelbacks
- Most runs: James Vince (710)
- Most wickets: James Faulkner (25)

PCA Player of the Year
- Chris Rushworth

Wisden Cricketers of the Year
- Moeen Ali; Gary Ballance; Adam Lyth; Angelo Mathews; Jeetan Patel

The 2015 English cricket season was the 116th in which the County Championship had been an official competition. It began in April with a round of university matches, and continued until the conclusion of a round of County Championship matches in late September. Three major domestic competitions were contested: the 2015 County Championship, the 2015 Royal London One-Day Cup and the 2015 NatWest t20 Blast.

During this season, two international teams toured England. New Zealand toured early in the summer, with Australia also touring later in the year. The latter tour saw England win The Ashes Test series 3–2; it was the 78th test series between the two sides.

== Roll of honour ==
Test series

- England v New Zealand: 2 Tests - Series drawn 1–1
- England v Australia: 5 Tests - England won 3–2

ODI series

- England v New Zealand: 5 ODIs - England won 3–2
- England v Australia: 5 ODIs - Australia won 3-2

Twenty20 International series

- England v New Zealand: Only T20I - England won by 56 runs
- England v Australia: Only T20I - England won by 5 runs

County Championship

- Division One winners: Yorkshire
- Division One runners-up: Middlesex
- Division Two winners: Surrey

Royal London One-Day Cup

- Winners: Gloucestershire
- Runners-up: Surrey

Natwest t20 Blast

- Winners: Lancashire Lightning
- Runners-up: Hampshire

Minor Counties Championship

- Winners: Cumberland
- Runners-up: Oxfordshire

MCCA Knockout Trophy

- Winners: Cornwall
- Runners-up: Northumberland

MCCA T20 Cup

- Winners: Cheshire
- Runners-up: Oxfordshire

Second XI Championship

- Winners: Nottinghamshire

Second XI Trophy

- Winners: Derbyshire

Second XI Twenty20

- Winners: Middlesex

Wisden Cricketers of the Year

- Moeen Ali, Gary Ballance, Adam Lyth, Angelo Mathews, Jeetan Patel

PCA Player of the Year

- Chris Rushworth

== Ashes tour ==
Cumulative record - Test wins	1876-2015
England	108
Australia	140
Drawn	93

== County Championship ==
=== Divisions ===
Division One	Division Two
Durham	Derbyshire
Hampshire	Essex
Middlesex	Glamorgan
Nottinghamshire	Gloucestershire
Somerset	Kent
Sussex	Lancashire
Warwickshire	Leicestershire
Worcestershire	Northamptonshire
Yorkshire	Surrey

Icon
Team promoted from Division Two
Team relegated from Division One

=== Division One Standings ===
- Pld = Played, W = Wins, L = Losses, D = Draws, T = Ties, A = Abandonments, Bat = Batting points, Bowl = Bowling points, Ded = Deducted points, Pts = Points.

Team	Pld	W	L	T	D	A	Bat	Bowl	Ded	Pts
Yorkshire (C)	16	11	1	0	4	0	45	45	0	286
Middlesex	16	7	2	0	7	0	29	43	1	218
Nottinghamshire	16	6	5	0	5	0	45	45	0	211
Durham	16	7	8	0	1	0	26	45	0	188
Warwickshire	16	5	5	0	6	0	31	45	0	186
Somerset	16	4	6	0	6	0	46	43	0	183
Hampshire	16	4	6	0	6	0	31	38	0	163
Sussex (R)	16	4	8	0	4	0	36	41	0	161
Worcestershire (R)	16	3	10	0	3	0	44	44	0	151

=== Division Two Standings ===
- Pld = Played, W = Wins, L = Losses, D = Draws, T = Ties, A = Abandonments, Bat = Batting points, Bowl = Bowling points, Ded = Deducted points, Pts = Points.

Team	Pld	W	L	T	D	A	Bat	Bowl	Ded	Pts
Surrey (C)	16	8	1	0	7	0	56	45	0	264
Lancashire (P)	16	7	1	0	8	0	58	44	0	254
Essex	16	6	5	0	5	0	37	42	0	200
Glamorgan	16	4	4	0	8	0	42	37	0	183
Northamptonshire	16	3	3	0	10	0	38	46	2	180
Gloucestershire	16	5	5	0	6	0	31	36	0	177
Kent	16	4	7	0	5	0	28	44	0	161
Derbyshire	16	3	7	0	6	0	34	42	1	153
Leicestershire	16	2	9	0	5	0	36	41	16	118

== Royal London One-Day Cup ==
=== Group stage ===
Group A

Pos	Team	Pld	W	L	T	NR	Ded	Pts	NRR
1	Surrey	8	6	1	0	1	0	13	1.079
2	Gloucestershire	8	5	2	0	1	0	11	0.069
3	Yorkshire Vikings	8	4	2	0	2	0	10	0.536
4	Durham	8	4	3	0	1	0	9	0.402
5	Northamptonshire Steelbacks	8	4	3	0	1	0	9	−0.458
6	Somerset	8	4	4	0	0	0	8	0.814
7	Derbyshire Falcons	8	4	4	0	0	0	8	0.151
8	Worcestershire	8	1	6	0	1	0	3	−0.629
9	Leicestershire Foxes	8	0	7	0	1	0	1	−1.914

Group B

Pos	Team	Pld	W	L	T	NR	Ded	Pts	NRR
1	Nottinghamshire Outlaws	8	5	1	0	2	0	12	0.755
2	Essex Eagles	8	4	2	0	2	0	10	0.480
3	Hampshire	8	3	3	0	2	0	9 (Note: The match between Glamorgan and Hampshire was abandoned due to a dangerous pitch (the match was recorded as a 'no result', but Hampshire were awarded 2 points and Glamorgan were docked 2 points).)	0.554
4	Kent Spitfires	8	3	3	0	2	0	8	0.031
5	Lancashire Lightning	8	3	3	0	2	0	8	−0.034
6	Warwickshire Bears	8	3	3	0	2	0	8	−0.765
7	Middlesex	8	3	4	0	1	0	7	−0.224
8	Glamorgan	8	2	2	0	4	4	3 (Note: Glamorgan were docked 2 points before the start of season after preparing an unfit pitch in 2014.)	0.160
9	Sussex Sharks	8	0	5	0	3	0	3	−1.063

=== Knockout stage ===
Quarter-finals
Nottinghamshire Outlaws (H)	170/4 (24 ov)
Durham	144 (21.2 ov)
Gloucestershire (H)	218/6 (33 ov)
Hampshire	217/7 (34 ov)
Essex Eagles (H)	232 (47.5 ov)
Yorkshire Vikings	252/9 (50 ov)
Surrey (H)	273 (49.5 ov)
Kent Spitfires	233 (37.4 ov)

Semi-finals
Yorkshire Vikings (H)	263/9 (50 ov)
Gloucestershire	267/2 (46.5 ov)
Surrey (H)	300/5 (50 ov)
Nottinghamshire Outlaws	296/7 (50 ov)

Final
Gloucestershire	220 (47.4 ov)
Surrey	214 (49.3 ov)

== NatWest t20 Blast ==
=== Group stage ===
North Division

Pos	Team	Pld	W	L	T	NR	Ded	Pts	NRR
1	Birmingham Bears	14	10	4	0	0	0	20	0.200
2	Worcestershire Rapids	14	9	4	0	1	0	19	0.682
3	Northamptonshire Steelbacks	14	7	5	0	2	0	16	0.115
4	Lancashire Lightning	14	7	6	0	1	0	15	0.469
5	Nottinghamshire Outlaws	14	7	6	0	1	0	15	0.018
6	Durham Jets	14	5	8	0	1	0	11	−0.149
7	Leicestershire Foxes	14	4	7	1	2	0	11	−0.304
8	Yorkshire Vikings	14	5	8	1	0	0	11	−0.324
9	Derbyshire Falcons	14	4	10	0	0	0	8	−0.662

South Division

Pos	Team	Pld	W	L	T	NR	Ded	Pts	NRR
1	Kent Spitfires	14	9	4	0	1	0	19	0.166
2	Sussex Sharks	14	7	5	0	2	0	16	0.206
3	Hampshire	14	8	6	0	0	0	16	−0.120
4	Essex Eagles	14	7	6	0	1	0	15	0.208
5	Gloucestershire	14	7	7	0	0	0	14	0.354
6	Glamorgan	14	7	7	0	0	0	14	−0.522
7	Surrey	14	5	6	0	3	0	13	−0.145
8	Somerset	14	4	8	0	2	0	10	−0.184
9	Middlesex	14	4	9	0	1	0	9	0.030

=== Knockout stage ===
Quarter-finals
Sussex Sharks (H)	165/7 (20 ov)
Northamptonshire Steelbacks	166/6 (16 ov)
Birmingham Bears (H)	189/5 (20 ov)
Essex Eagles	165/6 (20 ov)
Worcestershire Rapids (H)	196/4 (20 ov)
Hampshire (D/L)	58/2 (8.1 ov)
Kent Spitfires (H)	142 (20 ov)
Lancashire Lightning	142/6 (20 ov)

Semi-finals
Northamptonshire Steelbacks	153/5 (18 ov)
Birmingham Bears	131/6 (20 ov)
Hampshire	115 (19.5 ov)
Lancashire Lightning	119/4 (18.5 ov)

Final
Lancashire Lightning	166/7 (20.0 ov)
Northamptonshire Steelbacks	153/6 (20.0 ov)
