= Mitch Claydon =

Australian-born English cricketer

Mitchell Claydon
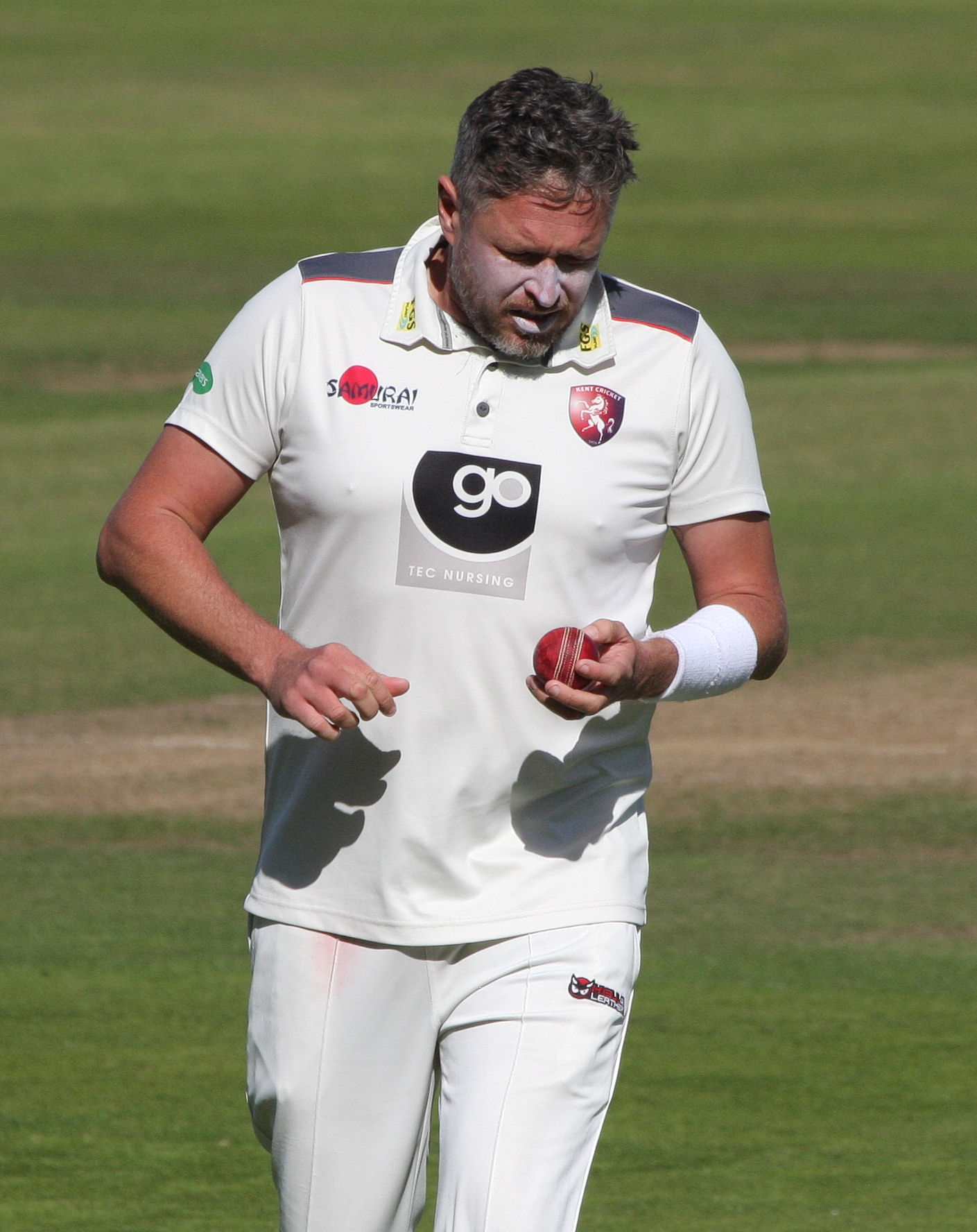
- Claydon in 2019

Personal information
- Full name: Mitchell Eric Claydon
- Born: 25 November 1982 (age 43); Fairfield, New South Wales, Australia
- Batting: Left-handed
- Bowling: Right-arm medium fast

Domestic team information
- Years: Team
- 2005–2006: Yorkshire
- 2007–2013: Durham (squad no. 25)
- 2013: → Kent (loan)
- 2010/11–2012/13: Canterbury
- 2014–2019: Kent (squad no. 8)
- 2015/16: Central Districts
- 2020–2021: Sussex (squad no. 4)
- FC debut: 3 August 2005 Yorkshire v Bangladesh A
- LA debut: 23 April 2006 Yorkshire v Derbyshire

Career statistics
Competition	FC	LA	T20
Matches	113	110	152
Runs scored	1,710	276	192
Batting average	15.54	8.36	9.60
100s/50s	0/4	0/0	0/0
Top score	77	19	19
Balls bowled	16,737	4,799	3,145
Wickets	312	138	164
Bowling average	31.86	32.61	27.12
5 wickets in innings	9	1	2
10 wickets in match	0	0	0
Best bowling	6/104	5/31	5/26
Catches/stumpings	11/–	9/–	27/–
- Source: CricInfo, 23 September 2021

Mitchell Eric Claydon (born 25 November 1982) is an Australian-English former first-class cricketer. Although he was born at Fairfield, New South Wales he holds a British passport. Claydon is a left-handed batsman and a right-arm medium-fast bowler. Claydon most recently played for Sussex County Cricket Club. In July 2021, Claydon announced that he would retire from cricket at the end of the 2021 season.

== Career ==
Claydon's debut match came as a tailender batsman for a Yorkshire Second XI against a combined Kent and Middlesex XI. Though neither team were victorious, Claydon proved himself economical with the ball. He later played for the team during a Bangladeshi tour of 2005, which saw a Bangladesh A team play against eight first-class counties.

Claydon made his County Championship debut in April of the following year. The match was a rain-affected draw, and Claydon's contribution was negligible. He made more of an impact in a later County Championship game against Durham in which, batting at number ten and scoring 38, he shared a partnership of 80 with centurion Anthony McGrath. Claydon remained within the Yorkshire Second XI during the early stages of the 2006 Second XI Championship, but was released at the end of that season.

Following his release from Yorkshire, he signed for Durham in time for the beginning of the 2007 season. It was not until 2009 that Claydon began to make an impact at Durham and took 22 wickets in their championship winning team. In 2010, during the English winter, Claydon signed for New Zealand team Canterbury and has continued to play regularly in New Zealand during the English off-season, playing for Canterbury for three seasons from 2010 to 2011 and then for Central Districts during the 2015–16 season.

In June 2013 Claydon signed for Kent initially on a months loan, later extended to a further month. It was announced that he was to join Kent permanently in 2014, but before that he returned to Durham one last time and took 6 wickets in a County Championship game against Sussex. Claydon was awarded his Kent county cap at the 2016 Canterbury Cricket Week in August 2016. Later in the same month he signed a new contract at the county. He played for Kent until the end of the 2019 season when he moved to Sussex.

Claydon plays for Newcastle City Cricket Club in Newcastle, New South Wales during the Australian summer. He has captained and acted as coach of the team.

On 1 August 2020, on the opening day of the 2020 Bob Willis Trophy, Claydon took his 300th wicket in first-class cricket.

On 30 September 2020 the Cricket Discipline Commission Panel banned Claydon for nine matches after he admitted to ball tampering. The charge related to Sussex's Bob Willis Trophy game against Middlesex on 23 August 2020, when Claydon put hand sanitiser on the ball.
