= Chris Rushworth =

English cricketer (born 1986)

Personal information
- Full name: Christopher Rushworth
- Born: 11 July 1986 (age 40); Sunderland, Tyne and Wear, England
- Batting: Right-handed
- Bowling: Right-arm fast-medium
- Role: Bowler
- Relatives: Lee Rushworth (brother); Phil Mustard (cousin)

Domestic team information
- Years: Team
- 2004; 2010–2022: Durham (squad no. 22)
- 2023–2025: Warwickshire
- FC debut: 27 April 2010 Durham v Yorkshire
- LA debut: 5 July 2004 Durham v Sri Lanka A

Career statistics
Competition	FC	LA	T20
Matches	176	87	85
Runs scored	1,788	215	20
Batting average	11.68	11.31	3.33
100s/50s	0/1	0/0	0/0
Top score	57	38*	5
Balls bowled	30,831	3,959	1,623
Wickets	676	140	78
Bowling average	22.48	24.40	27.19
5 wickets in innings	32	2	0
10 wickets in match	6	0	0
Best bowling	9/52	5/31	3/14
Catches/stumpings	37/–	19/–	18/–
- Source: ESPNcricinfo, 25 July 2025

Christopher Rushworth (born 11 July 1986) is an English cricketer A right-arm fast-medium bowler, he played for Durham and Warwickshire.

== Career ==
Rushworth made his debut in county cricket for Northumberland against Suffolk in 2004 Minor Counties Championship. He played a further Minor Counties Championship match for the county against Norfolk in 2005.

In 2004, he also made his debut for Durham in a List A match against Sri Lanka A. He wouldn't feature for Durham again following this match until the 2010 season, when he made his first-class debut against Yorkshire in the County Championship. He featured in further List A matches in the Clydesdale Bank 40. In the 2011 season, he made his Twenty20 debut against Warwickshire in the Friends Provident t20.

On 17 September 2014 against Northamptonshire, Rushworth took 9 for 52 and total match figures of 15 for 95, all taken in just one day of play, the best ever match figures by a Durham bowler in the County Championship. He also did it while keeping himself sober for a year for charity.

In August 2020, in the opening round of fixtures in the 2020 Bob Willis Trophy, Rushworth took his 500th first-class wicket. In April 2021, in the 2021 County Championship, Rushworth took his 500th wicket in the County Championship. The following month in the Championship, in the match against Worcestershire, Rushworth became the leading wicket-taker for Durham, taking his 528th first-class wicket. In July 2022, in the County Championship match against Middlesex, Rushworth took his 600th first-class wicket.

Rushworth announced his retirement from professional cricket on 9 December 2025.
