= Kent County Cricket Club in 2013 =

Kent County Cricket Club
2013 season
- Coach: (Cricket West Indies) Jimmy Adams
- Captain: (England) James Tredwell
- Overseas player: (South Africa) Vernon Philander (July)
- Ground(s): St Lawrence Ground, Canterbury; Nevill Ground, Tunbridge Wells
- County Championship: 7th, Division Two
- Yorkshire Bank 40: 4th, Group A
- Friends Life t20: 5th, South Group
- Most runs: FC: DI Stevens (1,304); LA: RWT Key (505); T20: DI Stevens (308)
- Most wickets: FC: CE Shreck (33); LA: MT Coles (15); T20: ME Claydon (18)
- Most catches: FC: DI Stevens (13); LA: DI Stevens (8); T20: MT Coles (7)
- Most wicket-keeping dismissals: FC: GO Jones (41); LA: GO Jones (9); T20: SW Billings (5)

In 2013, Kent County Cricket Club competed in Division Two of the County Championship, Group A of the 40-over Yorkshire Bank 40 and the South Group of the Friends Life t20. Kent also hosted a first-class match at the St Lawrence Ground against Cardiff MCCU at the start of the season and a T20 match against the touring New Zealanders in June. It was the second season in charge for head coach Jimmy Adams. The club captain was England spinner James Tredwell, taking over from Rob Key who had been club captain since 2006. Brendan Nash registered as a Kolpak player, ending his West Indies international career, which allowed Kent to sign another overseas player. South African fast bowler Vernon Philander filled this role, although he was only with the club for a short spell in July. Another new addition to the squad was 22-year-old Calum Haggett from Somerset. Shortly before the end of the season, Kent signed two young fast bowlers: Charlie Hartley and Matt Hunn (Matt Hunn made his debut in the final county championship match of 2013). In addition, Mitchell Claydon joined on loan from Durham on 11 June initially for one month, but this was extended for a second month (he later signed on a permanent basis for 2014).

Kent endured a difficult season, finishing seventh of nine in Division two of the County Championship (despite only losing twice; 11 of their 16 matches were drawn) and making little impact on the List A Yorkshire Bank 40 competition (won 6, lost 6) or the Friends Life t20 (won 3, lost 7).

23-year-old all-rounder Matt Coles joined Hampshire on loan in August before signing a three-year contract with them in September. Batsman Mike Powell announced his retirement in September after two years with Kent (and previously 15 years with Glamorgan). Despite being Kent's leading wicket taker in the County Championship in 2013, Charlie Shreck was not offered a new contract and he later signed for Leicestershire.

James Tredwell received further international recognition for England, playing in all five One Day Internationals of the January 2013 tour of India, and a further 10 ODIs during the English summer - including the final of the 2013 Champions Trophy. Tredwell took a total of 25 wickets in these matches, taking his tally to 36 wickets in 24 ODIs. He also took 2 wickets in 5 T20 Internationals (taking his total to 3 wickets in 7 T20Is), and was made captain for the second home T20I against New Zealand.

== Squad ==
- No. denotes the player's squad number, as worn on the back of their shirt.
- Ages given as of the first day of the County Championship season, 10 April 2013.

No.	Name	Nationality	Birth date	Batting style	Bowling style	Notes
Batsmen
4	Rob Key	England	12 May 1979 (aged 33)	Right-handed	Right arm off break	Club captain
10	Alex Blake	England	25 January 1989 (aged 24)	Left-handed	Right arm medium-fast	
14	Mike Powell	Wales	3 February 1977 (aged 36)	Right-handed	Right arm off break	
17	Sam Northeast	England	16 October 1989 (aged 23)	Right-handed	Right arm off break	Vice-captain
23	Daniel Bell-Drummond	England	3 August 1993 (aged 19)	Right-handed	Right arm medium	
30	Fabian Cowdrey	England	30 January 1993 (aged 20)	Right-handed	Slow left-arm orthodox	
40	Brendan Nash	Jamaica	14 December 1977 (aged 35)	Left-handed	Left arm medium	Kolpak Registration
All-rounders
3	Darren Stevens	England	30 April 1976 (aged 36)	Right-handed	Right arm medium	
21	Ben Harmison	England	9 January 1986 (aged 27)	Left-handed	Right arm medium-fast	
24	Adam Ball	England	1 March 1993 (aged 20)	Right-handed	Left arm fast-medium	
25	Calum Haggett	England	30 October 1990 (aged 22)	Left-handed	Right arm medium-fast	
26	Matt Coles	England	26 May 1990 (aged 22)	Left-handed	Right arm fast-medium	
Wicket-keepers
9	Geraint Jones	England	14 July 1979 (aged 33)	Right-handed	—	
20	Sam Billings	England	15 June 1991 (aged 21)	Right-handed	—	
Bowlers
5	Ivan Thomas	England	25 September 1991 (aged 21)	Right-handed	Right arm medium-fast	
15	James Tredwell	England	27 February 1982 (aged 31)	Left-handed	Right arm off break	
19	Charlie Shreck	England	6 January 1978 (aged 35)	Right-handed	Right arm fast-medium	
31	Mark Davies	England	4 October 1980 (aged 32)	Right-handed	Right arm medium	
33	Adam Riley	England	23 March 1992 (aged 21)	Right-handed	Right arm off break	
?	Mitchell Claydon	England	25 November 1982 (aged 30)	Left-handed	Right arm medium-fast	Signed (on loan) 11 June
?	Vernon Philander	South Africa	24 June 1985 (aged 27)	Right-handed	Right arm fast-medium	Overseas player (July)
?	Matt Hunn	England	22 March 1994 (aged 19)	Right-handed	Right arm fast-medium	Signed 23 September
-	Charlie Hartley	England	4 January 1994 (aged 19)	Right-handed	Right arm medium-fast	Signed 23 September

== County Championship ==
=== Division Two ===
Team	Pld	W	L	T	D	A	Bat	Bowl	Ded	Pts
Lancashire (C)	16	8	1	0	7	0	45	45	1.0	238
Northamptonshire (P)	16	5	3	0	8	0	55	43	0.0	202
Essex	16	5	4	0	7	0	43	41	3.0	182
Hampshire	16	4	3	0	9	0	45	35	0.0	171
Worcestershire	16	5	6	0	5	0	29	43	0.0	167
Gloucestershire	16	4	4	0	8	0	43	36	0.0	167
Kent	16	3	2	0	11	0	39	31	0.0	151
Glamorgan	16	3	6	0	7	0	41	39	0.0	149
Leicestershire	16	0	8	0	8	0	23	32	0.0	79
Source: Cricinfo

=== Matches ===
17–20 April	Kent	v	(H) Leicestershire	Match drawn
Scorecard	406 (93.5 overs); GO Jones 67 (98); JKH Naik 4/97 (21.5 overs)		495 (169.4 overs); MAG Boyce 135 (309); CJ Haggett 5/79 (23 overs)	Grace Road, Leicester; Umpires: RK Illingworth and RT Robinson
Scorecard	213/2d (62.1 overs); RWT Key 104* (109); SJ Thakor 1/36 (10 overs)			Grace Road, Leicester; Umpires: RK Illingworth and RT Robinson
Leicestershire won the toss and elected to field; Points: Leicestershire 9, Kent 9

24–27 April	Kent	v	(H) Lancashire	Match drawn
Scorecard	244 (100.1 overs); MJ Powell 57 (162); JM Anderson 4/57 (25.1 overs)		395/7d (135.4 overs); SM Katich 93 (135); MT Coles 3/84 (30 overs)	Old Trafford, Manchester; Umpires: NL Bainton and G Sharp
Scorecard	178/2 (61.2 overs); BP Nash 100* (141); G Chapple 1/36 (12 overs)			Old Trafford, Manchester; Umpires: NL Bainton and G Sharp
Kent won the toss and elected to bat; Points: Lancashire 8, Kent 5

1–3 May	Kent (H)	v	Northamptonshire	Northamptonshire won by 7 wickets
Scorecard	271 (94.2 overs); MJ Powell 70 (162); TA Copeland 5/71 (28.2 overs)		303 (90.1 overs); SD Peters 106 (238); CE Shreck 4/80 (24 overs)	St Lawrence Ground, Canterbury; Umpires: RJ Bailey and GD Lloyd
Scorecard	135 (47.1 overs); GO Jones 57 (77); TA Copeland 5/42 (21 overs)		105/3 (28.3 overs); SD Peters 37 (37); CJ Haggett 2/26 (10 overs)	St Lawrence Ground, Canterbury; Umpires: RJ Bailey and GD Lloyd
Kent won the toss and elected to bat; Points: Kent 5, Northamptonshire 22

17–18 May	Kent (H)	v	Worcestershire	Worcestershire won by 10 wickets
Scorecard	159 (51.2 overs); SA Northeast 52 (98); A Richardson 5/41 (17.2 overs)		194 (69.1 overs); MM Ali 54 (88); MT Coles 5/31 (15.1 overs)	St Lawrence Ground, Canterbury; Umpires: DJ Millns and P Willey
Scorecard	63 (28.3 overs); BW Harmison 19 (34); A Richardson 7/22 (14.3 overs)		31/0 (8.5 overs); MG Pardoe 15* (36)	St Lawrence Ground, Canterbury; Umpires: DJ Millns and P Willey
Worcestershire won the toss and elected to field; Points: Kent 3, Worcestershire 19

22–25 May	Essex (H)	v	Kent	Match drawn
Scorecard	212 (82 overs); GR Napier 58 (79); DI Stevens 4/36 (23 overs)		296 (103.4 overs); DI Stevens 136 (223); RJW Topley 3/81 (29.4 overs)	County Ground, Chelmsford; Umpires: MA Gough and AG Wharf
Scorecard	166/5 (60 overs); BT Foakes 86* (143); M Davies 4/36 (15 overs)			County Ground, Chelmsford; Umpires: MA Gough and AG Wharf
Kent won the toss and elected to field; Points: Essex 7, Kent 8

29 May – 1 June	Leicestershire	v	(H) Kent	Match drawn
Scorecard	186 (62.3 overs); EJH Eckersley 32 (35); DI Stevens 5/39 (19.3 overs)		353/3d (78.3 overs); BP Nash 128* (207); JKH Naik 2/95 (21.3 overs)	Nevill Ground, Tunbridge Wells; Umpires: SC Gale and PJ Hartley
Scorecard	139/1 (54.4 overs); EJH Eckersley 65* (135); DI Stevens 1/18 (8 overs)			Nevill Ground, Tunbridge Wells; Umpires: SC Gale and PJ Hartley
Leicestershire won the toss and elected to bat; Points: Kent 10, Leicestershire 4

5–8 June	Hampshire (H)	v	Kent	Match drawn
Scorecard	455 (145.4 overs); ND McKenzie 146 (214); AEN Riley 7/150 (43.4 overs)		321/7d (118 overs); BW Harmison 63 (121); DA Griffiths 2/70 (15.3 overs)	Rose Bowl, Southampton; Umpires: SJ O'Shaughnessy and P Willey
Scorecard	207/3d (34.4 overs); LA Dawson 87* (90); MT Coles 2/29 (5 overs)		296/8 (91.5 overs); DI Stevens 96 (105); DA Balcombe 2/35 (13 overs)	Rose Bowl, Southampton; Umpires: SJ O'Shaughnessy and P Willey
Hampshire won the toss and elected to bat; Points: Hampshire 8, Kent 7

12–15 June	Glamorgan	v	(H) Kent	Match drawn
Scorecard	378 (119.4 overs); MW Goodwin 136 (226); CJ Haggett 4/94 (33 overs)		135 (46.5 overs); RWT Key 23 (43); MG Hogan 3/42 (16 overs)	St Lawrence Ground, Canterbury; Umpires: SA Garratt and NA Mallender
Scorecard			489/9d (142 overs) (f/o); DI Stevens 119 (154); DA Cosker 5/120 (50 overs)	St Lawrence Ground, Canterbury; Umpires: SA Garratt and NA Mallender
Glamorgan won the toss and elected to bat; Points: Kent 5, Glamorgan 9

10–13 July	Gloucestershire (H)	v	Kent	Kent won by 2 wickets
Scorecard	562/5d (140.5 overs); APR Gidman 211 (347); CJ Haggett 3/87 (22 overs)		389/5d (100.3 overs); BW Harmison 101* (141); TMJ Smith 2/125 (37 overs)	College Ground, Cheltenham; Umpires: SA Garratt and SJ O'Shaughnessy
Scorecard	237/1d (41.5 overs); M Klinger 102* (123); SA Northeast 1/60 (14 overs)		411/8 (93.4 overs); BP Nash 199* (230); CN Miles 4/72 (17.4)	College Ground, Cheltenham; Umpires: SA Garratt and SJ O'Shaughnessy
Gloucestershire won the toss and elected to bat; Points: Gloucestershire 6, Kent 21

15–18 July	Hampshire	v	(H) Kent	Match drawn
Scorecard	405/9d (134.2 overs); MA Carberry 154 (295); JC Tredwell 3/83 (27.2 overs)		513 (141.2 overs); RWT Key 180 (285); JA Tomlinson 3/72 (27 overs)	St Lawrence Ground, Canterbury; Umpires: SC Gale and IJ Gould
Scorecard	200/4d (87 overs); LA Dawson 78* (166); JC Tredwell 3/87 (35 overs)			St Lawrence Ground, Canterbury; Umpires: SC Gale and IJ Gould
Hampshire won the toss and elected to bat; Points: Kent 8, Hampshire 7

2–5 August	Kent	v	(H) Worcestershire	Match drawn
Scorecard	324 (95.5 overs); BW Harmison 96 (220); JD Shantry 3/69 (22.5 overs)		284/8 (95 overs); TC Fell 94* (162); JC Tredwell 5/51 (21 overs)	New Road, Worcester; Umpires: RJ Bailey and MA Gough
Worcestershire won the toss and elected to field; Points: Worcestershire 8, Kent 8

21–24 August	Kent (H)	v	Gloucestershire	Match drawn
Scorecard	474 (129.5 overs); DI Stevens 126 (166); LC Norwell 3/104 (22 overs)		80/0d (28 overs); CDJ Dent 44* (98)	St Lawrence Ground, Canterbury; Umpires: NL Bainton and DJ Millns
Scorecard	4/0d (3.1 overs); RWT Key 2* (8)		307/9 (106 overs); GH Roderick 152* (252); CE Shreck 4/65 (25 overs)	St Lawrence Ground, Canterbury; Umpires: NL Bainton and DJ Millns
Kent won the toss and elected to bat; No play was possible on day 4; Points: Kent 7, Gloucestershire 5

3–5 September	Glamorgan (H)	v	Kent	Kent won by 7 wickets
Scorecard	158 (60 overs); BJ Wright 55 (103); DI Stevens 4/34 (15 overs)		175 (61.3 overs); DJ Bell-Drummond 78 (166); MG Hogan 6/65 (18.3 overs)	Sophia Gardens, Cardiff; Umpires: NGB Cook and G Sharp
Scorecard	258 (77.5 overs); GP Rees 52 (143); AEN Riley 3/69 (15.5 overs)		242/3 (72.2 overs); SA Northeast 88 (209); DA Cosker 2/34 (17 overs)	Sophia Gardens, Cardiff; Umpires: NGB Cook and G Sharp
Glamorgan won the toss and elected to bat; Points: Glamorgan 3, Kent 19

11–14 September	Essex	v	(H) Kent	Match drawn
Scorecard	276 (110.3 overs); OA Shah 84 (192); M Davies 4/67 (24.3 overs)		107 (49 overs); BW Harmison 30* (94); DD Masters 6/41 (18 overs)	St Lawrence Ground, Canterbury; Umpires: JW Lloyds and NA Mallender
Scorecard			215/7 (72 overs) (f/o); SA Northeast 70 (136); MS Panesar 4/49 (20 overs)	St Lawrence Ground, Canterbury; Umpires: JW Lloyds and NA Mallender
Kent won the toss and elected to field; Points: Kent 6, Essex 8

17–20 September	Kent	v	(H) Northamptonshire	Match drawn
Scorecard	418 (112 overs); BP Nash 107 (152); JD Middlebrook 6/78 (20 overs)		431/5d (122.4 overs); DJG Sales 110 (192); CE Shreck 2/80 (26 overs)	County Ground, Northampton; Umpires: NL Bainton and NGC Cowley
Northamptonshire won the toss and elected to field; Points: Northamptonshire 10, Kent 9

24–27 September	Lancashire	v	(H) Kent	Kent won by 2 wickets
Scorecard	284 (103.1 overs); AG Prince 134 (284); M Davies 2/41 (23 overs)		260 (62.3 overs); RWT Key 134 (162); SD Parry 3/51 (11.3 overs)	St Lawrence Ground, Canterbury; Umpires: NL Bainton and NGB Cook
Scorecard	393/5d (104.4 overs); AG Prince 108 (194); DI Stevens 2/80 (24 overs)		418/8 (91.4 overs); DI Stevens 205* (218); OJ Newby 3/55 (13.4 overs)	St Lawrence Ground, Canterbury; Umpires: NL Bainton and NGB Cook
Gloucestershire won the toss and elected to bat; Points: Kent 21, Lancashire 5

== Other First-Class Match ==
=== MCCU Matches ===
10–12 April (three-day match)	Kent	v	(H) Cardiff MCCU	Match drawn
Scorecard	333/8d (86 overs); DJ Bell-Drummond 102* (159); ME Hobden 5/89 (22 overs)		33/1 (12 overs); FK Cowdrey 23* (39); M Davies 1/10 (6 overs)	St Lawrence Ground, Canterbury; Umpires: PK Baldwin and MJD Bodenham
Cardiff MCCU won the toss and elected to field

== Yorkshire Bank 40 ==
=== Group A ===
Team	Pld	W	L	T	NR	Pts	NRR
Nottinghamshire Outlaws	12	9	3	0	0	18	+0.457
Northamptonshire Steelbacks	12	8	3	0	1	17	+0.393
Sussex Sharks	12	6	4	0	2	14	+0.464
Kent Spitfires	12	6	6	0	0	12	+0.229
Worcestershire Royals	12	5	7	0	0	10	+0.249
Netherlands	12	2	7	0	3	7	–1.157
Warwickshire Bears	12	2	8	0	2	6	–0.929
Source: Cricinfo

=== Matches ===
6 May	Kent; 239/8 (40 overs)	v	(H) Warwickshire; 238 (40 overs)	Kent won by 1 run
Scorecard	Kent; 239/8 (40 overs)	v	(H) Warwickshire; 238 (40 overs)	Edgbaston, Birmingham; Umpires: JW Lloyds and SJ O'Shaughnessy
Scorecard	BP Nash 98* (106); DL Maddy 2/27 (6 overs)		V Chopra 65 (82); MT Coles 2/38 (6 overs)	Edgbaston, Birmingham; Umpires: JW Lloyds and SJ O'Shaughnessy
Warwickshire won the toss and elected to field; Points: Warwickshire 0, Kent 2				Edgbaston, Birmingham; Umpires: JW Lloyds and SJ O'Shaughnessy

8 May	Kent; 220/6 (40 overs)	v	(H) Nottinghamshire; 140/3 (16.3 overs)	Nottinghamshire won by 7 wickets (with 15 balls remaining) (D/L method)
Scorecard	Kent; 220/6 (40 overs)	v	(H) Nottinghamshire; 140/3 (16.3 overs)	Trent Bridge, Nottingham; Umpires: NGB Cook and MA Gough; Player of the match: SJ Mullaney
Scorecard	RWT Key 62 (85); SJ Mullaney 4/29 (8 overs)		JWA Taylor 50* (42); DI Stevens 1/25 (4 overs)	Trent Bridge, Nottingham; Umpires: NGB Cook and MA Gough; Player of the match: SJ Mullaney
Nottinghamshire won the toss and elected to field; Rain reduced the Nottinghamshire innings to 33 overs, and then interrupted play after just 0.5 overs. Innings was reduced to 19 overs with a D/L method target of 140 runs to win.; Points: Nottinghamshire 2, Kent 0				Trent Bridge, Nottingham; Umpires: NGB Cook and MA Gough; Player of the match: SJ Mullaney

10 May	Netherlands (H); 101 (32.1 overs)	v	Kent; 102/3 (22.5 overs)	Kent won by 7 wickets (with 97 balls remaining) (D/L method)
Scorecard	Netherlands (H); 101 (32.1 overs)	v	Kent; 102/3 (22.5 overs)	Sportpark Het Schootsveld, Deventer; Umpires: NL Bainton and NGC Cowley
Scorecard	PM Seelaar 26 (32); JC Tredwell 4/22 (8 overs)		BP Nash 45* (74); PA van Meekeren 3/42 (8 overs)	Sportpark Het Schootsveld, Deventer; Umpires: NL Bainton and NGC Cowley
Kent won the toss and elected to field; Netherlands innings interrupted by rain after 4 overs, reducing the match to 39 overs per side (Kent's D/L target was 102 runs to win).; Points: Netherlands 0, Kent 2				Sportpark Het Schootsveld, Deventer; Umpires: NL Bainton and NGC Cowley

15 May	Worcestershire; 110/9 (25 overs)	v	(H) Kent; 111/7 (23.1 overs)	Kent won by 3 wickets (with 11 balls remaining)
Scorecard	Worcestershire; 110/9 (25 overs)	v	(H) Kent; 111/7 (23.1 overs)	St Lawrence Ground, Canterbury; Umpires: SA Garratt and DJ Millns; Player of the match: JC Tredwell
Scorecard	AN Kervezee 27 (31); MT Coles 4/20 (5 overs)		JC Tredwell 42* (40); JD Shantry 3/11 (5 overs)	St Lawrence Ground, Canterbury; Umpires: SA Garratt and DJ Millns; Player of the match: JC Tredwell
Kent won the toss and elected to field; Match reduced to 25 overs per side due to rain; Points: Kent 2, Worcestershire 0				St Lawrence Ground, Canterbury; Umpires: SA Garratt and DJ Millns; Player of the match: JC Tredwell

26 May	Sussex (H); 222/9 (40 overs)	v	Kent; 202 (39.2 overs)	Sussex won by 20 runs
Scorecard	Sussex (H); 222/9 (40 overs)	v	Kent; 202 (39.2 overs)	Cricket Field Road Ground, Horsham; Umpires: SA Garratt and RT Robinson
Scorecard	MH Yardy 42 (40); AJ Ball 3/36 (6.4 overs)		DI Stevens 51 (41); JE Anyon 2/14 (6.2 overs)	Cricket Field Road Ground, Horsham; Umpires: SA Garratt and RT Robinson
Kent won the toss and elected to field; Points: Sussex 2, Kent 0				Cricket Field Road Ground, Horsham; Umpires: SA Garratt and RT Robinson

27 May	Netherlands; 249/5 (40 overs)	v	(H) Kent; 250/2 (35.4 overs)	Kent won by 8 wickets (with 26 balls remaining)
Scorecard	Netherlands; 249/5 (40 overs)	v	(H) Kent; 250/2 (35.4 overs)	Nevill Ground, Tunbridge Wells; Umpires: RJ Evans and MA Gough
Scorecard	W Barresi 69 (83); MT Coles 2/63 (7 overs)		RWT Key 144* (121); MR Swart 1/31 (6.3 overs)	Nevill Ground, Tunbridge Wells; Umpires: RJ Evans and MA Gough
Kent won the toss and elected to bat; Points: Kent 2, Netherlands 0				Nevill Ground, Tunbridge Wells; Umpires: RJ Evans and MA Gough

2 June	Northamptonshire; 263/4 (40 overs)	v	(H) Kent; 234 (39.4 overs)	Northamptonshire won 29 runs
Scorecard	Northamptonshire; 263/4 (40 overs)	v	(H) Kent; 234 (39.4 overs)	Nevill Ground, Tunbridge Wells; Umpires: SC Gale and PJ Hartley
Scorecard	AG Wakely 102 (77); DI Stevens 1/37 (8 overs)		SW Billings 57 (67); TA Copeland 4/46 (8 overs)	Nevill Ground, Tunbridge Wells; Umpires: SC Gale and PJ Hartley
Kent won the toss and elected to field; Points: Kent 0, Northamptonshire 2				Nevill Ground, Tunbridge Wells; Umpires: SC Gale and PJ Hartley

19 June	Sussex; 336/5 (40 overs)	v	(H) Kent; 337/7 (38.3 overs)	Kent won by 3 wickets (with 9 balls remaining)
Scorecard	Sussex; 336/5 (40 overs)	v	(H) Kent; 337/7 (38.3 overs)	St Lawrence Ground, Canterbury; Umpires: NGB Cook and BV Taylor
Scorecard	LJ Wright 115 (61); DI Stevens 2/48 (8 overs)		DI Stevens 118 (53); WAT Beer 3/59 (8 overs)	St Lawrence Ground, Canterbury; Umpires: NGB Cook and BV Taylor
Kent won the toss and elected to field; Points: Kent 2, Sussex 0				St Lawrence Ground, Canterbury; Umpires: NGB Cook and BV Taylor

11 August	Kent; 289/6 (40 overs)	v	(H) Worcestershire; 250 (39.5 overs)	Kent won by 39 runs
Scorecard	Kent; 289/6 (40 overs)	v	(H) Worcestershire; 250 (39.5 overs)	New Road, Worcester; Umpires: NL Bainton and NJ Llong
Scorecard	RWT Key 112 (91); MM Ali 2/54 (8 overs)		DKH Mitchell 68 (66); ME Claydon 2/29 (4 overs)	New Road, Worcester; Umpires: NL Bainton and NJ Llong
Kent won the toss and elected to bat; Points: Worcestershire 0, Kent 2				New Road, Worcester; Umpires: NL Bainton and NJ Llong

13 August	Kent; 188/7 (40 overs)	v	(H) Northamptonshire; 189/5 (39.4 overs)	Northamptonshire won by 5 wickets (with 2 balls remaining)
Scorecard	Kent; 188/7 (40 overs)	v	(H) Northamptonshire; 189/5 (39.4 overs)	County Ground, Northampton; Umpires: JH Evans and NA Mallender
Scorecard	GO Jones 46* (52); MM Ali 2/54 (8 overs)		KJ Coetzer 90 (115); MT Coles 2/25 (8 overs)	County Ground, Northampton; Umpires: JH Evans and NA Mallender
Kent won the toss and elected to bat; Points: Northamptonshire 2, Kent 0				County Ground, Northampton; Umpires: JH Evans and NA Mallender

15 August	Warwickshire; 213/7 (40 overs)	v	(H) Kent; 113/4 (24.3 overs)	Warwickshire won by 7 runs (D/L method)
Scorecard	Warwickshire; 213/7 (40 overs)	v	(H) Kent; 113/4 (24.3 overs)	St Lawrence Ground, Canterbury; Umpires: IJ Gould and RT Robinson
Scorecard	WTS Porterfield 57 (79); JC Tredwell 2/19 (8 overs)		DI Stevens 42* (66); A Javid 2/34 (5 overs)	St Lawrence Ground, Canterbury; Umpires: IJ Gould and RT Robinson
Kent won the toss and elected to field; Match ended after 24.3 overs of the Kent innings due to floodlight failure (D/L par at this stage was 121 runs to win).; Points: Kent 0, Warwickshire 2				St Lawrence Ground, Canterbury; Umpires: IJ Gould and RT Robinson

26 August	Kent (H); 195/6 (40 overs)	v	Nottinghamshire; 199/5 (38.2 overs)	Nottinghamshire won by 5 wickets (with 10 balls remaining)
Scorecard	Kent (H); 195/6 (40 overs)	v	Nottinghamshire; 199/5 (38.2 overs)	St Lawrence Ground, Canterbury; Umpires: IJ Gould and NA Mallender
Scorecard	BP Nash 47 (66); SR Patel 2/30 (6 overs)		AD Hales 74 (90); M Davies 2/33 (8 overs)	St Lawrence Ground, Canterbury; Umpires: IJ Gould and NA Mallender
Kent won the toss and elected to bat; Points: Kent 0, Nottinghamshire 2				St Lawrence Ground, Canterbury; Umpires: IJ Gould and NA Mallender

== Friends Life t20 ==
=== South Division ===
Team	Pld	W	L	T	NR	Pts	NRR
Hampshire Royals	10	8	1	0	1	17	+0.810
Surrey	10	7	3	0	0	14	+0.915
Essex Eagles	10	5	4	0	1	11	+0.040
Middlesex Panthers	10	5	5	0	0	10	–0.194
Kent Spitfires	10	3	7	0	0	6	–0.941
Sussex Sharks	10	1	9	0	0	2	–0.520
Source: Cricinfo

=== Matches ===
28 June	Kent (H); 129/5 (15 overs)	v	Middlesex; 111/6 (11.4 overs)	Middlesex won by 4 wickets (with 2 balls remaining) (D/L method)
Scorecard	Kent (H); 129/5 (15 overs)	v	Middlesex; 111/6 (11.4 overs)	St Lawrence Ground, Canterbury; Umpires: TE Jesty and GD Lloyd; Player of the match: AM Rossington (Middlesex)
Scorecard	DI Stevens 26 (10); JH Davey 1/9 (1 overs)		AM Rossington 41* (20); VD Philander 4/8 (3 overs)	St Lawrence Ground, Canterbury; Umpires: TE Jesty and GD Lloyd; Player of the match: AM Rossington (Middlesex)
Middlesex won the toss and elected to field; Kent innings delayed by rain after 5 overs and the match was reduced to 15 overs per side. Middlesex innings delayed by rain after 2.4 overs and the innings was reduced to 12 overs with a target of 111 runs to win.; Points: Kent 0, Middlesex 2				St Lawrence Ground, Canterbury; Umpires: TE Jesty and GD Lloyd; Player of the match: AM Rossington (Middlesex)

30 June	Surrey; 176/3 (20 overs)	v	(H) Kent; 145/9 (20 overs)	Surrey won by 31 runs
Scorecard	Surrey; 176/3 (20 overs)	v	(H) Kent; 145/9 (20 overs)	St Lawrence Ground, Canterbury; Umpires: NL Bainton and SJ O'Shaughnessy; Player of the match: SM Davies (Surrey)
Scorecard	SM Davies 95* (70); MT Coles 2/20 (4 overs)		SA Northeast 61 (53); JW Dernbach 3/22 (4 overs)	St Lawrence Ground, Canterbury; Umpires: NL Bainton and SJ O'Shaughnessy; Player of the match: SM Davies (Surrey)
Surrey won the toss and elected to bat; Points: Kent 0, Surrey 2				St Lawrence Ground, Canterbury; Umpires: NL Bainton and SJ O'Shaughnessy; Player of the match: SM Davies (Surrey)

5 July	Essex; 164/6 (20 overs)	v	(H) Kent; 117 (17.3 overs)	Essex won by 47 runs
Scorecard	Essex; 164/6 (20 overs)	v	(H) Kent; 117 (17.3 overs)	St Lawrence Ground, Canterbury; Umpires: MJD Bodenham and TE Jesty; Player of the match: OA Shah (Essex)
Scorecard	OA Shah 59 (38); JC Tredwell 1/19 (4 overs)		RWT Key 26 (30); GR Napier 3/12 (2.3 overs)	St Lawrence Ground, Canterbury; Umpires: MJD Bodenham and TE Jesty; Player of the match: OA Shah (Essex)
Kent won the toss and elected to field; Points: Kent 0, Essex 2				St Lawrence Ground, Canterbury; Umpires: MJD Bodenham and TE Jesty; Player of the match: OA Shah (Essex)

7 July	Kent; 140/6 (20 overs)	v	(H) Middlesex; 142/1 (15.4 overs)	Middlesex won by 9 wickets (with 26 balls remaining)
Scorecard	Kent; 140/6 (20 overs)	v	(H) Middlesex; 142/1 (15.4 overs)	Uxbridge Cricket Club Ground, Uxbridge; Umpires: NGB Cook and GD Lloyd; Player of the match: AM Rossington (Middlesex)
Scorecard	AJ Blake 37* (34); TS Roland-Jones 2/19 (4 overs)		AM Rossington 74 (37); JC Tredwell 1/18 (4 overs)	Uxbridge Cricket Club Ground, Uxbridge; Umpires: NGB Cook and GD Lloyd; Player of the match: AM Rossington (Middlesex)
Middlesex won the toss and elected to field; Points: Middlesex 2, Kent 0				Uxbridge Cricket Club Ground, Uxbridge; Umpires: NGB Cook and GD Lloyd; Player of the match: AM Rossington (Middlesex)

8 July	Essex (H); 180/8 (20 overs)	v	Kent; 118 (17.3 overs)	Essex won by 62 runs
Scorecard	Essex (H); 180/8 (20 overs)	v	Kent; 118 (17.3 overs)	County Ground, Chelmsford; Umpires: PJ Hartley and P Willey; Player of the match: RS Bopara (Essex)
Scorecard	RS Bopara 39 (30); JC Tredwell 3/19 (4 overs)		SA Northeast 32 (25); RJW Topley 4/26 (4 overs)	County Ground, Chelmsford; Umpires: PJ Hartley and P Willey; Player of the match: RS Bopara (Essex)
Kent won the toss and elected to field; Points: Essex 2, Kent 0				County Ground, Chelmsford; Umpires: PJ Hartley and P Willey; Player of the match: RS Bopara (Essex)

21 July	Kent; 143/8 (20 overs)	v	(H) Hampshire; 135/8 (20 overs)	Kent won by 8 runs
Scorecard	Kent; 143/8 (20 overs)	v	(H) Hampshire; 135/8 (20 overs)	Rose Bowl, Southampton; Umpires: MJD Bodenham and JW Lloyds; Player of the match: ME Claydon (Kent)
Scorecard	DJ Bell-Drummond 27 (24); DR Briggs 3/19 (4 overs)		ND McKenzie 47 (34); ME Claydon 2/24 (4 overs)	Rose Bowl, Southampton; Umpires: MJD Bodenham and JW Lloyds; Player of the match: ME Claydon (Kent)
Kent won the toss and elected to bat; Points: Hampshire 0, Kent 2				Rose Bowl, Southampton; Umpires: MJD Bodenham and JW Lloyds; Player of the match: ME Claydon (Kent)

24 July	Kent (H); 173/3 (20 overs)	v	Sussex; 164/6 (20 overs)	Kent won by 9 runs
Scorecard	Kent (H); 173/3 (20 overs)	v	Sussex; 164/6 (20 overs)	St Lawrence Ground, Canterbury; Umpires: MJD Bodenham and RK Illingworth; Player of the match: DI Stevens (Kent)
Scorecard	DI Stevens 67* (44); CJ Liddle 3/43 (4 overs)		MW Machan 67 (48); DI Stevens 1/23 (2 overs)	St Lawrence Ground, Canterbury; Umpires: MJD Bodenham and RK Illingworth; Player of the match: DI Stevens (Kent)
Kent won the toss and elected to bat; Points: Kent 2, Sussex 0				St Lawrence Ground, Canterbury; Umpires: MJD Bodenham and RK Illingworth; Player of the match: DI Stevens (Kent)

26 July	Kent; 139/4 (20 overs)	v	(H) Surrey; 140/5 (19.1 overs)	Surrey won by 5 wickets (with 5 balls remaining)
Scorecard	Kent; 139/4 (20 overs)	v	(H) Surrey; 140/5 (19.1 overs)	The Oval, Kennington, London; Umpires: MJD Bodenham and P Willey; Player of the match: Azhar Mahmood (Surrey)
Scorecard	FK Cowdrey 50 (46); GJ Batty 2/14 (4 overs)		Azhar Mahmood 47* (31); DI Stevens 2/16 (4 overs)	The Oval, Kennington, London; Umpires: MJD Bodenham and P Willey; Player of the match: Azhar Mahmood (Surrey)
Kent won the toss and elected to bat; Points: Surrey 2, Kent 0				The Oval, Kennington, London; Umpires: MJD Bodenham and P Willey; Player of the match: Azhar Mahmood (Surrey)

29 July	Hampshire; 185/6 (20 overs)	v	(H) Kent; 123/9 (20 overs)	Hampshire won by 62 runs
Scorecard	Hampshire; 185/6 (20 overs)	v	(H) Kent; 123/9 (20 overs)	St Lawrence Ground, Canterbury; Umpires: JH Evans and G Sharp; Player of the match: MA Carberry (Hampshire)
Scorecard	MA Carberry 83* (56); MT Coles 2/41 (4 overs)		DI Stevens 39 (28); LA Dawson 4/19 (3 overs)	St Lawrence Ground, Canterbury; Umpires: JH Evans and G Sharp; Player of the match: MA Carberry (Hampshire)
Hampshire won the toss and elected to bat; Points: Kent 0, Hampshire 2				St Lawrence Ground, Canterbury; Umpires: JH Evans and G Sharp; Player of the match: MA Carberry (Hampshire)

31 July	Sussex (H); 113 (20 overs)	v	Kent; 117/2 (13.1 overs)	Kent won by 8 wickets (with 41 balls remaining)
Scorecard	Sussex (H); 113 (20 overs)	v	Kent; 117/2 (13.1 overs)	County Ground, Hove; Umpires: PJ Hartley and TE Jesty; Player of the match: MT Coles (Kent)
Scorecard	MW Machan 31 (20); MT Coles 3/14 (4 overs)		MT Coles 40 (23); JE Anyon 1/22 (2 overs)	County Ground, Hove; Umpires: PJ Hartley and TE Jesty; Player of the match: MT Coles (Kent)
Sussex won the toss and elected to bat; Points: Sussex 0, Kent 2				County Ground, Hove; Umpires: PJ Hartley and TE Jesty; Player of the match: MT Coles (Kent)

== Other T20 Match ==
=== Tour Match ===
2013 New Zealand tour of England

22 June	New Zealanders; 185/7 (20 overs)	v	(H) Kent; 143/7 (20 overs)	New Zealanders won by 42 runs
Scorecard	New Zealanders; 185/7 (20 overs)	v	(H) Kent; 143/7 (20 overs)	St Lawrence Ground, Canterbury; Umpires: M Burns and NGB Cook
Scorecard	MJ Guptill 56 (44); ME Claydon 5/31 (4 overs)		DI Stevens 41 (33); IG Butler 2/28 (4 overs)	St Lawrence Ground, Canterbury; Umpires: M Burns and NGB Cook
Kent won the toss and elected to field				St Lawrence Ground, Canterbury; Umpires: M Burns and NGB Cook
