= Kent County Cricket Club in 2018 =

2018 season of an English cricket team

Kent County Cricket Club
2018 season
- Coach: (England) Matthew Walker
- Captain: (England) Sam Billings
- Overseas players: (New Zealand) Matt Henry (Championship and One Day Cup) (New Zealand) Adam Milne (July–August, T20 only) (Cricket West Indies) Carlos Brathwaite (July, T20 only) (Australia) Marcus Stoinis (July–August, T20 only)
- Ground(s): St Lawrence Ground, Canterbury; Nevill Ground, Tunbridge Wells; County Ground, Beckenham
- County Championship: Division two runners-up (promoted)
- Royal London One-Day Cup: Runners-up
- Vitality Blast: Quarter-finals
- Regional Super50: Semi-finals
- Most runs: FC: JL Denly (954); LA: DJ Bell-Drummond (795); T20: JL Denly (409)
- Most wickets: FC: MJ Henry (75); LA: JL Denly (24); T20: JL Denly (20)
- Most catches: FC: SR Dickson (25); LA: AJ Blake (10); T20: SR Dickson (10)
- Most wicket-keeping dismissals: FC: AP Rouse (26); LA: AP Rouse (14); T20: SW Billings (13)

In 2018, Kent County Cricket Club competed in Division Two of the County Championship, the Royal London One-Day Cup and the 2018 t20 Blast. The county finished second in Division Two of the Championship and were promoted to Division One for the 2019 season. They reached the final of the One-Day Cup. losing to Hampshire at Lord's, and the quarter-final stage of the t20 Blast. In addition, before the start of the English cricket season, Kent competed in the 2017–18 Regional Super50, the List A competition of the West Indies domestic season, reaching the semi-final stage. This was the second time that Kent have competed in the competition, having played in the 2016–17 competition.

The season was the second in charge for head coach, and former player, Matthew Walker and saw the arrival of new assistant coach, former South African fast-bowler Allan Donald. Donald had been expected to join the county at the start of the 2017 season but was denied a work permit as he did not, at the time, hold a suitable coaching qualification. Former Kent and England wicket-keeper Paul Downton was appointed as Director of Cricket in January. Downton, who played for Kent between 1977 and 1979, was the managing director of the England and Wales Cricket Board from February 2014 until April 2015.

Sam Billings was the club captain for the first time, having replaced Sam Northeast in January 2018. Behind the scenes, chief executive Jamie Clifford departed the club in February 2018 to take up a position at MCC whilst the chairman of the Cricket Committee, former player Graham Johnson, did not seek re-election. Clifford's interim replacement, Ben Green, had previously worked at the ECB, Surrey and at the All England Club at Wimbledon. In November Simon Storey, who had been Chief Executive of Derbyshire County Cricket Club since 2012, was recruited in the role on a permanent basis, with Green initially taking on the role of Chief Operating Officer before leaving the club the following month.

At the end of the season Joe Denly was voted Players' Player of the Year at the Professional Cricketers' Association awards, beating teammate Matt Henry and Surrey batsman Rory Burns. He was also named Vitality Blast Player of the Year player of the year and Royal London One-Day Cup Player of the Year, as well as being included in the Team of the Year.

== Squad ==
=== Departures ===
Adam Ball, Hugh Bernard and Charlie Hartley were released by Kent at the end of the 2017 season. Matt Coles also left his home county to join county champions Essex in October 2017.

Sam Northeast, who had been club captain for the previous two seasons, left to join Hampshire in February. Northeast had been given permission to speak to other counties after having been replaced as captain in January by Sam Billings. Northeast declined to sign an extended contract with Kent and would have been out of contract at the end of the 2018 season. Kent were unwilling to keep Northeast as captain in the last year of his contract and relations between the two teams broke down, with Kent reluctantly allowing Northeast permission to speak to other teams.

During July all-rounder Will Gidman announced that he would retire as a player at the end of the season with a view to moving into coaching. He had deputised as Kent's Second XI coach whilst Min Patel was working with the England under-19 team. On 17 September, off-spinner James Tredwell announced his retirement from cricket after an 18-year career, having made his debut for Kent in 2000. Tredwell represented England in two Tests, 45 One Day Internationals and 17 T20 Internationals. His last competitive appearances for Kent were during the Regional Super50 in Antigua and he had been suffering from a shoulder injury for the whole of the domestic season. The following day, Kent announced that Matt Hunn was to leave the county to pursue a career outside of cricket once his contract expired at the end of the season after five years as a professional.

=== Arrivals ===
South African international Heino Kuhn signed a Kolpak contract with Kent on 7 March, subject to him obtaining a visa. Kuhn, a wicket-keeper batsman, has played four Test matches for South Africa and appeared in seven Twenty20 internationals for his home country. Later the same month the county announced the signing of New Zealand international bowler Matt Henry as their overseas player for the first half of the season. He was originally available for the first seven County Championship matches of the season and the Royal London One-Day Cup competition. After performing well and taking 49 Championship wickets, Henry agreed to return to the county for the final five matches of the season in August and September. He was awarded his county cap during his first spell at Canterbury. Seam bowler Harry Podmore was signed to what was reported to be a three-year contract at the start of April, adding to the depth of Kent's bowling attack.

Australian all-rounder Marcus Stoinis and New Zealand bowler Adam Milne were both signed in March to play in the T20 Blast. Milne had played for the team in 2017 in both the T20 competition and the County Championship whilst Stoinis had played five Second XI matches for Kent in 2012 whilst playing league cricket at Peterborough. Milne was available for the entire competition with Stoinis was available for Kent's final nine matches in the competition.

In May Kent added West Indian T20 international captain Carlos Brathwaite to their squad for the first four matches of the T20 Blast, filling the second overseas player spot before the arrival of Stoinis. Brathwaite credited the influence of Kent captain Sam Billings, who he has played alongside in both the Big Bash League and Indian Premier League, in persuading him to sign for the county. On 13 July, after playing three matches, it was announced that Brathwaite had extended his stay for a fifth match, thus filling the second overseas player slot until the arrival of Stoinis.

In September Kent announced the signing of 24 year-old seam bowler Matt Milnes from Nottinghamshire on a three-year deal beginning at the start of the 2019 season. Milnes had played only eight first-class matches, making his Nottinghamshire debut in June, and previously having played for Durham MCCU. On 1 October Kent announced another signing for the 2019 season with Dutch international left-arm fast bowler Fred Klaassen joining on a two-year contract.

=== Squad list ===
- Ages given as of the first day of the 2018 County Championship season, 13 April 2018.

No.	Name	Nationality	Birth date	Batting style	Bowling style	Notes
Batsmen
4	Heino Kuhn	South Africa	1 April 1984 (aged 34)	Right-handed	—	Kolpak signing
6	Joe Denly	England	16 March 1986 (aged 32)	Right-handed	Right arm leg break	Vice-captain
10	Alex Blake	England	25 January 1989 (aged 29)	Left-handed	Right arm medium-fast	
16	Zak Crawley	England	3 February 1998 (aged 20)	Right-handed	Right arm medium	
23	Daniel Bell-Drummond	England	3 August 1993 (aged 24)	Right-handed	Right arm medium	
58	Sean Dickson	South Africa	2 September 1991 (aged 26)	Right-handed	Right arm medium	British passport holder
All-rounders
3	Darren Stevens	England	30 April 1976 (aged 41)	Right-handed	Right arm medium	
9	Grant Stewart	Australia	19 February 1994 (aged 24)	Right-handed	Right arm medium	EU passport holder
17	Marcus Stoinis	Australia	16 August 1989 (aged 28)	Right-handed	Right arm medium	Overseas player; T20 Blast only
25	Calum Haggett	England	30 October 1990 (aged 27)	Left-handed	Right arm medium-fast	
26	Carlos Brathwaite	West Indies	18 July 1988 (aged 29)	Right-handed	Right arm medium	Overseas player; T20 Blast only
42	Will Gidman	England	14 February 1985 (aged 33)	Left-handed	Right arm medium	
Wicket-keepers
7	Sam Billings	England	15 June 1991 (aged 26)	Right-handed	—	Club captain
12	Adam Rouse	England	30 June 1992 (aged 25)	Right-handed	—	
21	Ollie Robinson	England	1 December 1998 (aged 19)	Right-handed	—	
Bowlers
1	Harry Podmore	England	23 July 1994 (aged 23)	Right-handed	Right arm medium	Signed 3 April
5	Ivan Thomas	England	25 September 1991 (aged 26)	Right-handed	Right arm medium-fast	
8	Mitchell Claydon	England	25 November 1982 (aged 35)	Left-handed	Right arm medium-fast	
11	Imran Qayyum	England	23 May 1993 (aged 24)	Right-handed	Slow left-arm orthodox	
14	Matt Hunn	England	22 March 1994 (aged 24)	Right-handed	Right arm fast-medium	
15	James Tredwell	England	27 February 1982 (aged 36)	Left-handed	Right arm off break	
20	Adam Milne	New Zealand	13 April 1992 (aged 26)	Right-handed	Right arm fast	Overseas player; T20 Blast only
24	Matt Henry	New Zealand	14 December 1991 (aged 26)	Right-handed	Right arm fast-medium	Overseas player; Championship and One Day Cup
33	Adam Riley	England	23 March 1992 (aged 26)	Right-handed	Right arm off break	

== Regional Super50 ==
Kent competed in the 2017–18 Regional Super50, a List A tournament that is part of the West Indian domestic season, after accepting an invitation from the West Indies Cricket Board. This was the second consecutive year that the county competed in the competition which ran from 30 January to 24 February. In the absence of club captain Sam Billings who was with the England cricket team in Australia and New Zealand, the team was captained by Joe Denly and, in Denly's absence at the end of the tour, Will Gidman. Head coach Matt Walker was also working with the England T20 team and assistant coach Allan Donald and Second XI coach Min Patel led the tour.

Kent were drawn in Group B and played two matches against each of the other teams in the group: Guyana, Jamaica, Leeward Islands and the United States. All of the county's matches took place on Antigua. After a loss against Guyana in their opening fixture, good team bowling performances and half centuries from Alex Blake and, in the next match, Zak Crawley, saw Kent beat both Jamaica and the Leeward Islands. Crawley's score of 99 not out was his highest List A score in only his fourth match, with the match ending in controversial circumstances with the opposing Leeward Islands bowling wide balls in what was seen by some as an attempt to deny Crawley the opportunity to reach his century.

In the following match Joe Denly's score of 96 and three wickets for Adam Riley led Kent to victory over the United States before a fine bowling performance, including career best figures of 4/20 from Will Gidman, allowed Kent to dismiss Guyana for 158 and earn a bonus point victory. A loss despite an unbeaten century from Daniel Bell-Drummond, who added 135 runs with Adam Rouse for the fifth wicket, in a close game against Jamaica followed before Kent defeated the US in a low scoring game. A win against the Leeward Islands in the final match of the group stage featured half-centuries from Bell-Drummond and Sean Dickson and four wickets from Adam Riley. The win, in a rain affected match which saw the Leewards being set 40 runs to win from seven balls after a rain delay in their innings reduced the number of overs allowed to 42, saw Kent qualify for the semi-finals, finishing second in the group behind Guyana.

The semi-final was also affected by rain. Barbados scored 263/3 batting first, with West Indian international Kraigg Brathwaite scoring an unbeaten century. Kent's reply was interrupted by rain on four occasions and the innings was eventually restricted to 43 overs, leaving 37 runs needed from 15 balls after the final rain delay. Despite a half-century from Sean Dickson and a 64 run partnership for the fourth wicket between Dickson and Adam Rouse, Kent could only score 216/8, losing by 13 runs to the defending champions in the competition who were described as "talented" and as "probably the strongest team in the Caribbean".

=== Group B ===
Kent finished in second place in group B behind Guyana. They qualified for the semi-final stage of the qualification.

Pos	Team	Pld	W	L	T	NR	BP	Pts	NRR
1	Guyana	8	6	2	0	0	2	26	0.425
2	Kent	8	6	2	0	0	1	25	0.402
3	Jamaica	8	5	3	0	0	4	24	0.846
4	Leeward Islands	8	2	6	0	0	1	9	−0.270
5	United States	8	1	7	0	0	1	5	−1.303

Source: CricInfo

=== Matches ===
31 January	Guyana; 233 (49 overs)	v	Kent; 198 (46.3 overs)	Guyana won by 35 runs
Scorecard	Guyana; 233 (49 overs)	v	Kent; 198 (46.3 overs)	Sir Vivian Richards Stadium, Antigua; Umpires: Z Bassarath and D Ramdhanie; Player of the match: V Permaul (Guyana)
Scorecard	S Chanderpaul 67 (97); ME Claydon 5/31 (10 overs)		Z Crawley 60 (73); V Permaul 4/46 (10 overs)	Sir Vivian Richards Stadium, Antigua; Umpires: Z Bassarath and D Ramdhanie; Player of the match: V Permaul (Guyana)
Guyana won the toss and elected to bat; Points: Guyana 4, Kent 0 ME Claydon recorded his best List A bowling figures with 5/31 Z Crawley recorded his highest List A score with 60 runs IAA Thomas recorded his highest List A score with 6 runs.				Sir Vivian Richards Stadium, Antigua; Umpires: Z Bassarath and D Ramdhanie; Player of the match: V Permaul (Guyana)

4 February	Jamaica; 156 (41.3 overs)	v	Kent; 159/6 (43.3 overs)	Kent won by 4 wickets (with 39 balls remaining)
Scorecard	Jamaica; 156 (41.3 overs)	v	Kent; 159/6 (43.3 overs)	Sir Vivian Richards Stadium, Antigua; Umpires: Z Bassarath and D Ramdhanie; Player of the match: AJ Blake (Kent)
Scorecard	AM McCarthy 76 (86); IAA Thomas 4/30 (9.3 overs)		AJ Blake 74* (105); AD Russell 2/30 (8 overs)	Sir Vivian Richards Stadium, Antigua; Umpires: Z Bassarath and D Ramdhanie; Player of the match: AJ Blake (Kent)
Jamaica won the toss and elected to bat; Points: Kent 4, Jamaica 0 IAA Thomas and JL Denly recorded their best List A bowling figures with 4/30 and 4/35, respectively				Sir Vivian Richards Stadium, Antigua; Umpires: Z Bassarath and D Ramdhanie; Player of the match: AJ Blake (Kent)

6 February	Leeward Islands; 183 (49.1 overs)	v	Kent; 187/1 (44.3 overs)	Kent won by 9 wickets (with 33 balls remaining)
Scorecard	Leeward Islands; 183 (49.1 overs)	v	Kent; 187/1 (44.3 overs)	Sir Vivian Richards Stadium, Antigua; Umpires: Z Bassarath and J Williams; Player of the match: Z Crawley (Kent)
Scorecard	T Warde 71 (91); WRS Gidman 3/31 (9 overs)		Z Crawley 99* (140)	Sir Vivian Richards Stadium, Antigua; Umpires: Z Bassarath and J Williams; Player of the match: Z Crawley (Kent)
Kent won the toss and elected to field; Points: Kent 4, Leeward Islands 0 Z Crawley recorded his highest List A score with 99 not out				Sir Vivian Richards Stadium, Antigua; Umpires: Z Bassarath and J Williams; Player of the match: Z Crawley (Kent)

8 February	Kent; 215/9 (50 overs)	v	United States; 186/9 (50 overs)	Kent won by 29 runs
Scorecard	Kent; 215/9 (50 overs)	v	United States; 186/9 (50 overs)	Sir Vivian Richards Stadium, Antigua; Umpires: DK Butler and LS Reifer; Player of the match: JL Denly (Kent)
Scorecard	JL Denly 96 (109); KRP Silva 3/42 (7 overs)		Ibrahim Khaleel 61 (114); AEN Riley 3/36 (9 overs)	Sir Vivian Richards Stadium, Antigua; Umpires: DK Butler and LS Reifer; Player of the match: JL Denly (Kent)
United States won the toss and elected to field; Points: Kent 4, United States 0 AEN Riley recorded his best List A bowling figures with 3/36				Sir Vivian Richards Stadium, Antigua; Umpires: DK Butler and LS Reifer; Player of the match: JL Denly (Kent)

10 February	Guyana; 158 (47.1 overs)	v	Kent; 162/7 (37 overs)	Kent won by 3 wickets (with 78 balls remaining)
Scorecard	Guyana; 158 (47.1 overs)	v	Kent; 162/7 (37 overs)	Coolidge Cricket Ground, Antigua; Umpires: Z Bassarath and L Rajkumar; Player of the match: WRS Gidman (Kent)
Scorecard	CD Barnwell 36 (66); WRS Gidman 4/20 (10 overs)		WRS Gidman 29 not out (48); DM Bishoo 4/35 (10 overs)	Coolidge Cricket Ground, Antigua; Umpires: Z Bassarath and L Rajkumar; Player of the match: WRS Gidman (Kent)
Guyana won the toss and elected to bat; Points: Kent 5, Guyana 0 WRS Gidman recorded his best List A bowling figures with 4/20 G Stewart made his debut in List A cricket				Coolidge Cricket Ground, Antigua; Umpires: Z Bassarath and L Rajkumar; Player of the match: WRS Gidman (Kent)

14 February	Kent; 239/5 (50 overs)	v	Jamaica; 240/7 (49.1 overs)	Jamaica won by 3 wickets (with 5 balls remaining)
Scorecard	Kent; 239/5 (50 overs)	v	Jamaica; 240/7 (49.1 overs)	Sir Vivian Richards Stadium, Antigua; Umpires: LS Reifer and J Williams; Player of the match: AD Russell (Jamaica)
Scorecard	DJ Bell-Drummond 105* (146); FA Allen 2/35 (10 overs)		AD Russell 108* (111); JL Denly 3/53 (10 overs)	Sir Vivian Richards Stadium, Antigua; Umpires: LS Reifer and J Williams; Player of the match: AD Russell (Jamaica)
Jamaica won the toss and elected to field; Points: Jamaica 4, Kent 0 AP Rouse recorded his highest score in List A cricket with 75 not out				Sir Vivian Richards Stadium, Antigua; Umpires: LS Reifer and J Williams; Player of the match: AD Russell (Jamaica)

16 February	Kent; 172/9 (50 overs)	v	United States; 142 (42 overs)	Kent won by 30 runs
Scorecard	Kent; 172/9 (50 overs)	v	United States; 142 (42 overs)	Sir Vivian Richards Stadium, Antigua; Umpires: Z Bassarath and L Rajkumar; Player of the match: KRP Silva (USA)
Scorecard	G Stewart 44 (86); NP Kenjige 2/20 (10 overs)		KRP Silva 50 (57); Imran Qayyum 4/33 (10 overs)	Sir Vivian Richards Stadium, Antigua; Umpires: Z Bassarath and L Rajkumar; Player of the match: KRP Silva (USA)
Kent won the toss and elected to bat; Points: Kent 4, USA 0 G Stewart recorded his highest score in List A cricket with 44 runs Imran Qayyum recorded his best List A bowling figures with 4/33				Sir Vivian Richards Stadium, Antigua; Umpires: Z Bassarath and L Rajkumar; Player of the match: KRP Silva (USA)

18 February	Kent; 266/9 (50 overs)	v	Leeward Islands; 196/6 (42 overs)	Kent won by 23 runs (D/L method)
Scorecard	Kent; 266/9 (50 overs)	v	Leeward Islands; 196/6 (42 overs)	Coolidge Cricket Ground, Antigua; Umpires: LS Reifer and J Williams; Player of the match: AEN Riley
Scorecard	SR Dickson 72 (62); O Peters 5/49 (10 overs)		KU Carty 69 (87); AEN Riley 4/40 (10 overs)	Coolidge Cricket Ground, Antigua; Umpires: LS Reifer and J Williams; Player of the match: AEN Riley
Kent won the toss and elected to bat; The Leeward Islands innings was reduced to 42 overs due to rain with a revised target of 220 set; Points: Kent 4, Leeward Islands 0 AEN Riley recorded his best List A bowling figures with 4/40				Coolidge Cricket Ground, Antigua; Umpires: LS Reifer and J Williams; Player of the match: AEN Riley

==== Semi-final ====
21 February	Barbados; 263/3 (50 overs)	v	Kent; 216/8 (43 overs)	Barbados won by 13 runs (D/L method)
Scorecard	Barbados; 263/3 (50 overs)	v	Kent; 216/8 (43 overs)	Coolidge Cricket Ground, Antigua; Umpires: N Duguid and DK Butler; Player of the match: KC Brathwaite (Barbados)
Scorecard	KC Brathwaite 105 (135); AEN Riley 1/34 (10 overs)		SR Dickson 51 (73); HR Walsh 2/43 (8 overs)	Coolidge Cricket Ground, Antigua; Umpires: N Duguid and DK Butler; Player of the match: KC Brathwaite (Barbados)
Barbados won the toss and elected to bat; Rain during the Kent innings reduced the innings to 43 overs with a target of 230 runs to win; Barbados advanced to the final				Coolidge Cricket Ground, Antigua; Umpires: N Duguid and DK Butler; Player of the match: KC Brathwaite (Barbados)

== County Championship ==
Kent finished second in Division Two of the County Championship and were promoted to Division One for the 2019 season. They won 10 matches, which was more wins than any other team in the division, drew one and lost three, but were beaten in their final match of the season by Warwickshire who won the division as a result. The two teams had started the final match equal on points.

The county played 14 Championship matches in 2018, seven at home and seven at away grounds. Kent's opening fixture was at home against Gloucestershire, starting on 13 April at the St Lawrence Ground. Six of the seven home matches were scheduled to take place at the St Lawrence Ground with one match, against Warwickshire in June, scheduled to take place at the Nevill Ground in Tunbridge Wells. This match was confirmed in February after a pre-season inspection of the ground, subject to another inspection before the start of the season. Kent's match at Tunbridge Wells in 2017 almost had to be moved to another ground due to concerns over the maintenance of the ground by Tunbridge Wells Borough Council who own the site.

Joe Denly was named as official vice-captain of the team in March and captained the team at the start of the season, while club captain Sam Billings was playing in the 2018 Indian Premier League.

=== Division Two ===
Team	Pld	W	L	T	D	A	Bat	Bowl	Ded	Pts
Warwickshire (P)	14	9	2	0	3	0	41	42	0	242
Kent (P)	14	10	3	0	1	0	16	40	0	221
Sussex	14	6	4	0	4	0	32	38	0	186
Middlesex	14	7	4	0	3	0	14	38	0	179
Gloucestershire	14	5	4	0	5	0	15	37	0	157
Leicestershire	14	5	7	0	2	0	22	40	3	149
Derbyshire	14	4	7	0	3	0	30	38	0	147
Durham	14	4	7	0	3	1	16	35	0	130
Northamptonshire	14	4	8	0	1	1	14	38	0	126
Glamorgan	14	2	10	0	2	0	13	38	1	92

Source: Cricinfo

- Warwickshire and Kent were promoted to Division One

=== Matches ===
13–16 April	Kent (H)	v	Gloucestershire	Gloucestershire won by 5 wickets
Scorecard	64 (18.5 overs); Z Crawley 15 (26 balls); MD Taylor 4/20 (6 overs)		110 (39 overs); GH Roderick 51 (102 balls); MJ Henry 4/33 (14 overs)	St Lawrence Ground, Canterbury; Umpires: NL Bainton and M Burns
Scorecard	153 (48.3 overs); DJ Bell-Drummond 61 (63); RF Higgins 5/22 (14 overs)		108/5 (28.3 overs); BAC Howell 52* (90); MJ Henry 3/37 (14 overs)	St Lawrence Ground, Canterbury; Umpires: NL Bainton and M Burns
Uncontested toss; Gloucestershire chose to field; No play on day 1 or before lunch of day 2 due to a wet outfield. Play ended early on day 2 due to bad light and on day 3 due to rain and bad light.; Points: Kent 3, Gloucestershire 19 MJ Henry, HG Kuhn and HW Podmore made their Kent debuts

20–21 April	Durham (H)	v	Kent	Kent won by 9 wickets
Scorecard	91 (30.4 overs); GJ Harte 16 (33); WJ Weighell 16 (16); MJ Henry 5/28 (11 overs)		169 (56.4 overs); HG Kuhn 54 (127); WJ Weighell 3/29 (11.4 overs)	Riverside Ground, Chester-le-Street; Umpires: BJ Debenham and RT Robinson
Scorecard	170 (43.1 overs); WJ Weighell 84 (89); MJ Henry 7/45 (14.1 overs)		95/1 (23.1 overs); DJ Bell-Drummond 45* (64); NJ Rimmington 1/28 (8 overs)	Riverside Ground, Chester-le-Street; Umpires: BJ Debenham and RT Robinson
Uncontested toss; Kent chose to field; Points: Durham 3, Kent 19 MJ Henry recorded his best first-class bowling figures in Durham's second innings (7/45) and his best match figures (12/73)

4–6 May	Glamorgan (H)	v	Kent	Kent won by 6 wickets
Scorecard	94 (46.4 overs); JR Murphy 39* (135); DI Stevens 6/26 (16 overs)		174 (50.5 overs); JL Denly 43 (51); T van der Gugten 7/42 (19.5 overs)	Sophia Gardens, Cardiff; Umpires: GD Lloyd and BV Taylor
Scorecard	274 (86.3 overs); SE Marsh 76 (113); MJ Henry 4/59 (20.3 overs)		195/4 (48.5 overs); HG Kuhn 69* (87); M de Lange 2/50 (12 overs)	Sophia Gardens, Cardiff; Umpires: GD Lloyd and BV Taylor
Uncontested toss; Kent chose to field; Points: Glamorgan 3, Kent 19

11–13 May	Kent (H)	v	Sussex	Kent won by 58 runs
Scorecard	215 (74.1 overs); HG Kuhn 60 (116 balls); D Weise 4/54 (21 overs)		181 (43.5 overs); MGK Burgess 54 (70 balls); MJ Henry 4/69 (18 overs)	St Lawrence Ground, Canterbury; Umpires: RJ Bailey and RJ Warren
Scorecard	235 (62.4 overs); MJ Henry 55 (53 balls); I Sharma 4/52 (17 overs)		211 (58 overs); BC Brown 48 (93 balls); MJ Henry 4/69 (18 overs)	St Lawrence Ground, Canterbury; Umpires: RJ Bailey and RJ Warren
Uncontested toss; Sussex chose to field; Points: Kent 20, Sussex 3

9–12 June	Kent	v	Gloucestershire (H)	Match drawn
Scorecard	582/9d (160.4 overs); SR Dickson 117 (214 balls); CN Miles 4/122 (30.4 overs)		240 (99.4 overs); GL Buuren 83 (145 balls); MJ Henry 6/58 (20 overs)	Bristol County Ground, Bristol; Umpires: NJ Llong and GD Lloyd
Scorecard			322/7 (126.4 overs) (f/o); CDJ Dent 76 (180 balls); HW Podmore 2/55 (16.4 overs)	Bristol County Ground, Bristol; Umpires: NJ Llong and GD Lloyd
Kent won the toss and chose to bat; Points: Gloucestershire 7, Kent 12

20–23 June	Kent (H)	v	Warwickshire	Kent won by 73 runs
Scorecard	197 (54.1 overs); JL Denly 59 (116 balls); KHD Barker 5/32 (13.1 overs)		125 (36.4 overs); IJL Trott 51* (81 balls); HW Podmore 4/26 (8 overs)	Nevill Ground, Tunbridge Wells; Umpires: JD Middlebrook and SJ O'Shaughnessy
Scorecard	446/8d (120 overs); SR Dickson 133 (229 balls); KHD Barker 4/64 (17.2 overs)		445 (140.1 overs); IR Bell 172 (282 balls); HW Podmore 4/84 (28 overs)	Nevill Ground, Tunbridge Wells; Umpires: JD Middlebrook and SJ O'Shaughnessy
Uncontested toss; Warwickshire chose to field; Points: Kent 19, Warwickshire 3 HW Podmore and JL Denly recorded their best first-class bowling figures with 4/26 and 3/24 respectively. Podmore also recorded his best first-class match figures with 8/110. Z Crawley recorded his highest first-class score with 93 runs in Kent's second innings

25–27 June	Kent (H)	v	Middlesex	Kent won by 342 runs
Scorecard	241 (71.2 overs); AP Rouse 42 (89 balls); JK Fuller 4/86 (15.2 overs)		56 (24 overs); SS Eskinazi 25 (27 balls); G Stewart 6/22 (10 overs)	St Lawrence Ground, Canterbury; Umpires: Y Barde and NGB Cook
Scorecard	281 (79.4 overs); G Stewart 103 (74 balls); HWR Cartwright 3/33 (14 overs)		124 (33.5 overs); TJ Murtagh 40 (21 balls); HW Podmore 6/36 (14 overs)	St Lawrence Ground, Canterbury; Umpires: Y Barde and NGB Cook
Kent won the toss and chose to bat; Played as a day-night match with a pink ball; Points: Kent 20, Middlesex 3 G Stewart recorded his highest first-class score with 38 runs in Kent's first innings and then again with 103 runs in their second innings. He also achieved his first five-wicket haul in first-class cricket (6/21) in Middlesex's first innings, and his best match figures (8/58). Stewart's score of 103 set a new Kent record for the highest score by a number 10 batsman in first-class cricket. The stand of 100 runs for the last wicket between Stewart and IAA Thomas included only one run scored by IAA Thomas, equalling the lowest contribution made in a century partnership in first-class cricket HW Podmore achieved his best first-class bowling figures, and his first five-wicket haul, in the Middlesex second innings (6/36).

22–25 July	Kent (H)	v	Leicestershire	Leicestershire won by 10 wickets
Scorecard	104 (37.5 overs); DI Stevens 38* (54 balls); ZJ Chappell 3/14 (7 overs)		229 (80.4 overs); EJH Eckersley 74 (169 balls); ME Claydon 2/27 (11.4 overs)	St Lawrence Ground, Canterbury; Umpires: T Lungley and JH Evans
Scorecard	199 (49.2 overs); SR Dickson 59 (72 balls); Mohammad Abbas 4/55 (16.2 overs)		76/0 (15.5 overs); HE Dearden 55 (62 balls)	St Lawrence Ground, Canterbury; Umpires: T Lungley and JH Evans
Uncontested toss; Leicestershire chose to field first; Points: Leicestershire 20, Kent 3

19–21 August	Leicestershire (H)	v	Kent	Kent won by 8 wickets
Scorecard	220 (68.3 overs); PJ Horton 49 (120 balls); IAA Thomas 4/35 (12.3 overs)		195 (52.2 overs); JL Denly 62 (99 balls); Mohammad Abbas 6/48 (17.2 overs)	Grace Road, Leicester; Umpires: JW Lloyds and NL Bainton
Scorecard	227 (62.5 overs); HE Dearden 74 (139 balls); IAA Thomas 5/91 (20 overs)		253/2 (54.2 overs); SR Dickson 134* (158 balls); Mohammad Abbas 2/50 (14 overs)	Grace Road, Leicester; Umpires: JW Lloyds and NL Bainton
Uncontested toss; Kent chose to field; Points: Leicestershire 4, Kent 19 OG Robinson made his first-class debut IAA Thomas took his best figures in first-class cricket in Leicestershire's first innings with 4/35 and then took his first five-wicket haul in the second innings, taking 5/90 D Klein replaced Z Chappell during Leicestershire's first innings as a concussion replacement after Chappell was hit on the head whilst batting

29 August – 1 September	Kent (H)	v	Derbyshire	Kent won by 6 wickets
Scorecard	561 (131.4 overs); JL Denly 106 (215 balls); AP Palladino 5/113 (30.4 overs)		400 (126.3 overs); WL Madsen 93 (157 balls); IAA Thomas 3/45 (10.3 overs)	County Cricket Ground, Derby; Umpires: ID Blackwell and NGB Cook
Scorecard	110/4 (19.2 overs); Z Crawley 34 (32 balls); Hamidullah Qadri 2/34 (6 overs)		270 (96.4 overs) (f/o); HR Hosein 66* (147 balls); JL Denly 4/36 (14.4 overs)	County Cricket Ground, Derby; Umpires: ID Blackwell and NGB Cook
Kent won the toss and chose to bat; Points: Derbyshire 5, Kent 23 Z Crawley and MJ Henry recorded their highest first-class scores with 96 and 81 runs respectively in Kent's first innings JL Denly recorded his best bowling figures in first-class cricket with 4/36 in Derbyshire's second innings

4–7 September	Kent (H)	v	Northamptonshire	Kent won by 102 runs
Scorecard	137 (47 overs); DJ Bell-Drummond 23 (70 balls); RJ Gleeson 3/16 (11 overs)		105 (36.3 overs); BA Hutton 27 (39 balls); MJ Henry 7/42 (16.3 overs)	St Lawrence Ground, Canterbury; Umpires: M Burns and PR Pollard
Scorecard	287 (71.2 overs); JL Denly 81 (116 balls); RJ Gleeson 6/79 (19 overs)		217 (71.4 overs); AM Rossington 56 (105 balls); MJ Henry 4/72 (22 overs)	St Lawrence Ground, Canterbury; Umpires: M Burns and PR Pollard
Uncontested toss; Northamptonshire chose to field; 20 overs were lost to bad light at the end of day one. Only 19 balls were bowled on day two due to rain and bad light.; Points: Kent 19, Northamptonshire 3 MJ Henry recorded his best first-class bowling figures in Northamptonshire's first innings with 7/42.

10–12 September	Middlesex (H)	v	Kent	Kent won by 3 wickets
Scorecard	161 (45.2 overs); JK Fuller 37* (45 balls); DI Stevens 4/44 (12 overs)		192 (49.5 overs); DI Stevens 64 (73 balls); JK Fuller 4/49 (11.5 overs)	Lord's, London; Umpires: MJ Saggers and BV Taylor
Scorecard	186 (60.2 overs); SD Robson 36 (61 balls); MJ Henry 4/40 (18.2 overs)		157/7 (44 overs); HG Kuhn 39 (73 balls); JK Fuller 3/53 (14 overs)	Lord's, London; Umpires: MJ Saggers and BV Taylor
Uncontested toss; Kent chose to field; Points: Middlesex 3, Kent 19

18–20 September	Glamorgan	v	Kent (H)	Kent won by an innings and 172 runs
Scorecard	186 (67.1 overs); JR Murphy 80 (182 balls); MJ Henry 4/45 (18.1 overs)		436 (105.4 overs); Z Crawley 168 (237 balls); KA Bull 3/64 (18.4 overs)	St Lawrence Ground, Canterbury; Umpires: JH Evans and RJ Warren
Scorecard	78 (30.2 overs); JR Murphy 22* (69 balls); DI Stevens 5/24 (13.2 overs)			St Lawrence Ground, Canterbury; Umpires: JH Evans and RJ Warren
Glamorgan won the toss and chose to bat; Points: Kent 24, Glamorgan 3 Z Crawley recorded his maiden first-class century in Kent's first innings (scoring 168) Kent secured promotion to Division One shortly after this match was completed when Sussex failed to gain maximum batting points in their match against Warwickshire.

24–27 September	Kent	v	Warwickshire (H)	Warwickshire won by an innings and 34 runs
Scorecard	167 (59 overs); MJ Henry 32* (48 balls); CJC Wright 3/29 (15 overs)		380 (115.5 overs); DP Sibley; JL Denly 3/48 (18.5 overs)	Edgbaston Cricket Ground, Birmingham; Umpires: GD Lloyd and RT Robinson
Scorecard	179 (56 overs); Z Crawley 75 (152 balls); OP Stone 3/35 (10.2 overs)			Edgbaston Cricket Ground, Birmingham; Umpires: GD Lloyd and RT Robinson
Kent won the toss and chose to bat; Points: Warwickshire 23, Kent 2

== Other first-class matches ==
Kent began the 2018 English cricket season with a three-day match against Oxford MCC University on 1 April. They played a four-day match against the touring Pakistanis on the same ground at the end of the month. Both matches were draws, each having been hit by poor weather.

Only 33 overs were possible during the match against Oxford MCCU. A wet outfield at the St Lawrence Ground delayed the start of the match but play was possible after lunch on day one with Kent scoring 100/3. Bad light stopped any play after tea on day one and heavy overnight rain made the outfield impossible to play on during days two or three of the match. Joe Denly captained the team for the first time in a home match, becoming the first Kent player born in Canterbury to captain the team in a match in the city.

The match against Pakistan was also drawn after being disrupted by the weather. After bowling out the Pakistanis for 168 in overcast conditions and reaching 39/1 on the first day of the match, Kent were unable to bat on either the second or third days due to a combination of bad light and persistent rain. Further play was only possible on the afternoon of the final day, with Kent scoring 209/4 from 64 overs before the match was drawn. Joe Denly scored Kent's first century of the season, making an unbeaten 113, whilst Will Gidman took 5/47 during Pakistan's innings.

1–3 April	Kent (H)	v	Oxford MCC University	Match drawn
Scorecard	100/3 (33 overs); Z Crawley 42 (69 balls); WJR Robertson 1/7 (3 overs)			St Lawrence Ground, Canterbury; Umpires: BJ Debenham and MJ Saggers
Oxford MCCU won the toss and chose to field; No play before lunch due to a wet outfield or after tea due to bad light on day 1. No play on day 2 or 3 due to rain and a wet outfield.; The match was abandoned early on day 3

28 April – 1 May	Pakistanis	v	Kent (H)	Match drawn
Scorecard	168 (55.2 overs); Imam-ul-Haq 61 (111 balls); WRS Gidman 5/47 (15 overs)		209/4 (64 overs); JL Denly 113* (186 balls); Shadab Khan 2/88 (18 overs)	St Lawrence Ground, Canterbury; Umpires: SJ O'Shaughnessy and JW Lloyds
Pakistan won the toss and chose to bat; Bad light stopped play after 15 overs of the final session on day 1. No play was possible on day 2 due to persistent light rain and bad light or on day 3 due to heavy rain. No play was possible before mid-afternoon on day 4 due to a wet outfield.

== Royal London One-Day Cup ==
Kent played in the South group of the 2018 Royal London One-Day Cup, finishing third in the group and qualifying for the quarter-final stage of the competition. They played eight matches in the group stage of the competition, playing once against each of the other teams in the group. Four home matches were split between the St Lawrence Ground and the County Cricket Ground, Beckenham, each of which staged two matches.

=== South group ===
Pos	Team	Pld	W	L	T	NR	Ded	Pts	NRR
1	Hampshire (Note: advanced directly to the semi-finals)	8	5	2	0	1	0	11	0.327
2	Essex Eagles (Note: advanced to the play-offs)	8	5	3	0	0	0	10	0.791
3	Kent Spitfires	8	5	3	0	0	0	10	0.010
4	Somerset	8	4	3	0	1	0	9	0.548
5	Surrey	8	4	3	0	1	0	9	−0.848
6	Middlesex	8	4	4	0	0	0	8	0.089
7	Gloucestershire	8	2	3	0	3	0	7	−0.250
8	Sussex Sharks	8	2	4	0	2	0	6	0.075
9	Glamorgan	8	1	7	0	0	0	2	−0.784

Source: Cricinfo

=== Matches ===
17 May	Kent; 188 (43.3 overs)	v	(H) Sussex; 189/3 (39.5 overs)	Sussex won by 7 wickets (with 61 balls remaining)
Scorecard	Kent; 188 (43.3 overs)	v	(H) Sussex; 189/3 (39.5 overs)	County Cricket Ground, Hove; Umpires: ID Blackwell and MJ Saggers
Scorecard	DJ Bell-Drummond 90 (115 balls); DR Briggs 3/23 (10 overs)		BC Brown 73* (73 balls); MJ Henry 2/30 (8 overs)	County Cricket Ground, Hove; Umpires: ID Blackwell and MJ Saggers
Kent won the toss and chose to bat first; Points: Sussex 2, Kent 0				County Cricket Ground, Hove; Umpires: ID Blackwell and MJ Saggers

20 May	Middlesex (H); 313/9 (50 overs)	v	Kent; 243 (43.5 overs)	Middlesex won by 70 runs
Scorecard	Middlesex (H); 313/9 (50 overs)	v	Kent; 243 (43.5 overs)	Brunton Memorial Ground, Radlett; Umpires: RJ Bailey and PK Baldwin
Scorecard	PR Stirling 125 (115 balls); CJ Haggett 3/59 (9 overs)		HG Kuhn 90 (92 balls); TG Helm 4/49 (7 overs)	Brunton Memorial Ground, Radlett; Umpires: RJ Bailey and PK Baldwin
Middlesex won the toss and chose to bat; Points: Middlesex 2, Kent 0				Brunton Memorial Ground, Radlett; Umpires: RJ Bailey and PK Baldwin

25 May	Glamorgan; 274 (49.3 overs)	v	Kent (H); 278/6 (48.1 overs)	Kent won by 4 wickets (with 11 balls remaining)
Scorecard	Glamorgan; 274 (49.3 overs)	v	Kent (H); 278/6 (48.1 overs)	St Lawrence Ground, Canterbury; Umpires: MA Gough and BJ Debenham
Scorecard	NJ Selman 92 (125 balls); JL Denly 4/56 (10 overs)		JL Denly 150* (143 balls); RAJ Smith 2/41 (9 overs)	St Lawrence Ground, Canterbury; Umpires: MA Gough and BJ Debenham
Kent won the toss and chose to field first; Points: Kent 2, Glamorgan 0 JL Denly set a new Kent record for the highest individual score in List A cricket with his 150 not out. The score was also his highest List A score.				St Lawrence Ground, Canterbury; Umpires: MA Gough and BJ Debenham

27 May	Kent; 296/4 (50 overs)	v	Hampshire (H); 295/5 (50 overs)	Kent won by 1 run
Scorecard	Kent; 296/4 (50 overs)	v	Hampshire (H); 295/5 (50 overs)	Southampton; Umpires: MJ Saggers and CM Watts
Scorecard	DJ Bell-Drummond 82 (111 balls); BJ Taylor 2/35 (10 overs)		JJ Weatherley 105 (141 balls); DI Stevens 2/48 (10 overs)	Southampton; Umpires: MJ Saggers and CM Watts
Hampshire won the toss and chose to field; Points: Kent 2, Hampshire 0				Southampton; Umpires: MJ Saggers and CM Watts

29 May	Somerset; 221/9 (42 overs)	v	Kent (H); 88/1 (16 overs)	Kent won by 28 runs (D/L Method)
Scorecard	Somerset; 221/9 (42 overs)	v	Kent (H); 88/1 (16 overs)	St Lawrence Ground, Canterbury; Umpires: NGB Cook and DJ Millns
Scorecard	L Gregory 60 (61 balls); MJ Henry 3/37 (9 overs)		JL Denly 44* (53 balls); L Gregory 1/19 (4 overs)	St Lawrence Ground, Canterbury; Umpires: NGB Cook and DJ Millns
Kent won the toss and chose to field; The match was reduced to 42 overs each before the toss due to rain and a wet outfield. Rain halted the match after 16 overs of Kent's innings and no restart was possible.; Points: Kent 2, Somerset 0				St Lawrence Ground, Canterbury; Umpires: NGB Cook and DJ Millns

1 June	Kent (H); 384/8 (50 overs)	v	Surrey; 164 (30.1 overs)	Kent won by 220 runs
Scorecard	Kent (H); 384/8 (50 overs)	v	Surrey; 164 (30.1 overs)	County Cricket Ground, Beckenham; Umpires: RJ Bailey and AG Wharf
Scorecard	HG Kuhn 117 (112 balls); TK Curran 4/75 (10 overs)		JJ Roy 68 (56 balls); DI Stevens 6/25 (6.1 overs)	County Cricket Ground, Beckenham; Umpires: RJ Bailey and AG Wharf
Surrey won the toss and chose to field; Points: Kent 2, Surrey 0 Kent's total of 384/8 equalled their record innings total in List A cricket DI Stevens recorded his best List A bowling figures with 6/25				County Cricket Ground, Beckenham; Umpires: RJ Bailey and AG Wharf

3 June	Gloucestershire; 322/8 (50 overs)	v	Kent (H); 323/3 (46.3 overs)	Kent won by 7 wickets (with 21 balls remaining)
Scorecard	Gloucestershire; 322/8 (50 overs)	v	Kent (H); 323/3 (46.3 overs)	County Cricket Ground, Beckenham; Umpires: NL Bainton and JW Lloyds
Scorecard	GT Hankins 92 (120 balls); DI Stevens 2/43 (10 overs)		HG Kuhn 113 (102 balls); CN Miles 2/73 (9 overs)	County Cricket Ground, Beckenham; Umpires: NL Bainton and JW Lloyds
Gloucestershire won the toss and chose to bat; Points: Kent 2, Gloucestershire 0				County Cricket Ground, Beckenham; Umpires: NL Bainton and JW Lloyds

6 June	Essex (H); 337/7 (50 overs)	v	Kent; 184 (37.5 overs)	Essex won by 153 runs
Scorecard	Essex (H); 337/7 (50 overs)	v	Kent; 184 (37.5 overs)	County Cricket Ground, Chelmsford; Umpires: DJ Millns and MJ Saggers
Scorecard	RS Bopara 125 (88 balls); MJ Henry 2/59 (9.1 overs)		SR Dickson 51 (66 balls); JA Porter 4/37 (9 overs)	County Cricket Ground, Chelmsford; Umpires: DJ Millns and MJ Saggers
Kent won the toss and chose to field; Points: Essex 2, Kent 0				County Cricket Ground, Chelmsford; Umpires: DJ Millns and MJ Saggers

==== Quarter-final ====
14 June	Nottinghamshire (H); 255/8 (50 overs)	v	Kent; 257/1 (35.5 overs)	Kent won by 9 wickets (with 85 balls remaining)
Scorecard	Nottinghamshire (H); 255/8 (50 overs)	v	Kent; 257/1 (35.5 overs)	Trent Bridge, Nottingham; Umpires: MA Gough and M Burns
Scorecard	SJ Mullaney 90 (108 balls); HW Podmore 4/57 (10 overs)		HG Kuhn 124* (114 balls); M Carter 1/57 (6 overs)	Trent Bridge, Nottingham; Umpires: MA Gough and M Burns
Kent won the toss and chose to field; Kent progressed to the semi-final				Trent Bridge, Nottingham; Umpires: MA Gough and M Burns

==== Semi-final ====
17 June	Worcestershire (H); 306/6 (50 overs)	v	Kent; 307/8 (49.4 overs)	Kent won by 2 wickets (with 2 balls remaining)
Scorecard	Worcestershire (H); 306/6 (50 overs)	v	Kent; 307/8 (49.4 overs)	New Road, Worcester; Umpires: NGB Cook and NA Mallender; Player of the match: HG Kuhn (Kent)
Scorecard	OB Cox 122 (106); DI Stevens 2/33 (10 overs)		HG Kuhn 127 (118); PR Brown 3/53 (7.4 overs)	New Road, Worcester; Umpires: NGB Cook and NA Mallender; Player of the match: HG Kuhn (Kent)
Worcestershire won the toss and chose to bat; Kent progressed to the final				New Road, Worcester; Umpires: NGB Cook and NA Mallender; Player of the match: HG Kuhn (Kent)

==== Final ====
30 June	Hampshire; 330/7 (50 overs)	v	Kent; 269 (47.1 overs)	Hampshire won by 61 runs
Scorecard	Hampshire; 330/7 (50 overs)	v	Kent; 269 (47.1 overs)	Lord's, London; Umpires: NGB Cook and DJ Millns
Scorecard	RR Rossouw 125 (114 balls); JL Denly 4/57 (10 overs)		DJ Bell-Drummond 86 (89 balls); GK Berg 2/43 (9.1 overs)	Lord's, London; Umpires: NGB Cook and DJ Millns
Kent won the toss and chose to field				Lord's, London; Umpires: NGB Cook and DJ Millns

== Vitality Blast ==
Kent played in the South group of the 2018 Vitality Blast. They played 14 matches, playing each of the other counties in the group at least once. Seven matches during the group stages were played at home grounds, five at the St Lawrence Ground and two at the County Cricket Ground, Beckenham. The county finished second in the group and played a home quarter-final match against Lancashire, losing by six wickets in a repeat of the 2015 quarter-final result between the two teams.

=== South group ===
Pos	Team	Pld	W	L	T	NR	Ded	Pts	NRR
1	Somerset	14	10	4	0	0	0	20	0.786
2	Kent Spitfires	14	8	2	0	4	0	20	0.627
3	Sussex Sharks	14	7	3	0	4	0	18	0.737
4	Gloucestershire	14	8	4	0	2	0	18	0.381
5	Surrey	14	7	5	0	2	0	16	0.989
6	Glamorgan	14	7	6	0	1	0	15	−0.144
7	Essex Eagles	14	2	8	1	3	0	8	−1.035
8	Hampshire	14	2	9	1	2	0	7	−0.824
9	Middlesex	14	2	12	0	0	0	4	−1.128

Source: BBC Sport

=== Matches ===
6 July	Kent; 173/6 (20 overs)	v	Surrey (H); 167 (18.5 overs)	Kent won by 6 runs
Scorecard	Kent; 173/6 (20 overs)	v	Surrey (H); 167 (18.5 overs)	The Oval, London; Umpires: MJ Saggers and R Warren; Player of the match: JL Denly (Kent)
Scorecard	JL Denly 102 (63 balls); MW Pillans 3/22 (4 overs)		BT Foakes 75* (47 balls); AF Milne 3/22 (3.5 overs)	The Oval, London; Umpires: MJ Saggers and R Warren; Player of the match: JL Denly (Kent)
Kent won the toss and chose to bat; Points: Surrey 0, Kent 2 JL Denly became the first player in professional T20 cricket to take a hat-trick and score a century in the same match				The Oval, London; Umpires: MJ Saggers and R Warren; Player of the match: JL Denly (Kent)

8 July	Somerset (H); 159/6 (20 overs)	v	Kent; 163/2 (16.3 overs)	Kent won by 8 wickets (with 21 balls remaining)
Scorecard	Somerset (H); 159/6 (20 overs)	v	Kent; 163/2 (16.3 overs)	County Ground, Taunton; Umpires: PK Baldwin and JH Evans; Player of the match: HG Kuhn (Kent)
Scorecard	JC Hildreth 57 (45 balls); CR Brathwaite 4/21 (4 overs)		HG Kuhn 67* (42 balls); JH Davey 1/10 (1 over)	County Ground, Taunton; Umpires: PK Baldwin and JH Evans; Player of the match: HG Kuhn (Kent)
Kent won the toss and chose to field; Points: Somerset 0, Kent 2				County Ground, Taunton; Umpires: PK Baldwin and JH Evans; Player of the match: HG Kuhn (Kent)

11 July	Gloucestershire (H); 184/7 (20 overs)	v	Kent; 179/8 (20 overs)	Gloucestershire won by 5 runs
Scorecard	Gloucestershire (H); 184/7 (20 overs)	v	Kent; 179/8 (20 overs)	County Cricket Ground, Bristol; Umpires: JH Evans and MA Gough; Player of the match: JMR Taylor (Gloucestershire)
Scorecard	JMR Taylor 42* (23 balls); CR Brathwaite 2/30 (4 overs)		HG Kuhn 44 (34 balls); RF Higgins 2/34 (4 overs)	County Cricket Ground, Bristol; Umpires: JH Evans and MA Gough; Player of the match: JMR Taylor (Gloucestershire)
Kent won the toss and chose to field; Points: Gloucestershire 2, Kent 0				County Cricket Ground, Bristol; Umpires: JH Evans and MA Gough; Player of the match: JMR Taylor (Gloucestershire)

13 July	Kent (H); 210/4 (20 overs)	v	Hampshire; 207/6 (20 overs)	Kent won by 3 runs
Scorecard	Kent (H); 210/4 (20 overs)	v	Hampshire; 207/6 (20 overs)	County Cricket Ground, Beckenham; Umpires: BJ Debenham and GD Lloyd; Player of the match: SW Billings (Kent)
Scorecard	SW Billings 95* (54 balls); RA Stevenson 2/39 (4 overs)		LA Dawson 75* (43 balls); JL Denly 3/37 (4 overs)	County Cricket Ground, Beckenham; Umpires: BJ Debenham and GD Lloyd; Player of the match: SW Billings (Kent)
Hampshire won the toss and chose to field; Points: Kent 2, Hampshire 0				County Cricket Ground, Beckenham; Umpires: BJ Debenham and GD Lloyd; Player of the match: SW Billings (Kent)

20 July	Surrey; 250/6 (20 overs)	v	Kent (H)	No result
Scorecard	Surrey; 250/6 (20 overs)	v	Kent (H)	St Lawrence Ground, Canterbury; Umpires: PK Baldwin and NA Mallender
Scorecard	AJ Finch 83 (38 balls); Imran Qayyum 3/40 (3 overs)			St Lawrence Ground, Canterbury; Umpires: PK Baldwin and NA Mallender
Surrey won the toss and chose to bat; The match was abandoned after Surrey's innings due to rain; Points: Kent 1, Surrey 1 Imran Qayyum took his best figures in Twenty20 cricket with 3/40				St Lawrence Ground, Canterbury; Umpires: PK Baldwin and NA Mallender

27 July	Kent (H); 99/2 (11.2 overs)	v	Sussex	No result
Scorecard	Kent (H); 99/2 (11.2 overs)	v	Sussex	St Lawrence Ground, Canterbury; Umpires: JW Lloyds and CM Watts
Scorecard	JL Denly 52 (36 balls); Rashid Khan 1/12 (2 overs)			St Lawrence Ground, Canterbury; Umpires: JW Lloyds and CM Watts
Sussex won the toss and chose to bowl; The match was abandoned after 11.2 overs due to rain; Points: Kent 1, Sussex 1 JL Denly became Kent's leading run scorer in T20 cricket after scoring 3,135 runs, passing DI Stevens total of 3,115 runs				St Lawrence Ground, Canterbury; Umpires: JW Lloyds and CM Watts

29 July	Glamorgan (H)	v	Kent	No result (match abandoned without a toss)
Scorecard	Glamorgan (H)	v	Kent	Sophia Gardens, Cardiff; Umpires: NA Mallender and PR Pollard
No toss; No play possible due to rain; Points: Glamorgan 1, Kent 1				Sophia Gardens, Cardiff; Umpires: NA Mallender and PR Pollard

2 August	Kent (H); 191/4 (20 overs)	v	Essex; 163 (20 overs)	Kent won by 28 runs
Scorecard	Kent (H); 191/4 (20 overs)	v	Essex; 163 (20 overs)	St Lawrence Ground, Canterbury; Umpires: RJ Bailey and M Burns; Player of the match: SW Billings (Kent)
Scorecard	SW Bllings 56* (39 balls); A Zampa 2/31 (4 overs)		RS Bopara 42 (23 balls); AF Milne 4/15 (4 overs)	St Lawrence Ground, Canterbury; Umpires: RJ Bailey and M Burns; Player of the match: SW Billings (Kent)
Kent won the toss and chose to bat; Points: Kent 2, Essex 0 The partnership of 106 runs between SW Billings and MP Stoinis set a new Kent record for the fourth wicket in T20 cricket				St Lawrence Ground, Canterbury; Umpires: RJ Bailey and M Burns; Player of the match: SW Billings (Kent)

3 August	Kent; 139/7 (20 overs)	v	Hampshire (H); 88 (16.1 overs)	Kent won by 51 runs
Scorecard	Kent; 139/7 (20 overs)	v	Hampshire (H); 88 (16.1 overs)	Rose Bowl, Southampton; Umpires: DJ Millns and PA Pollard; Player of the match: MP Stoinis (Kent)
Scorecard	HG Kuhn 29 (22 balls); LA Dawson 2/22 (4 overs)		LA Dawson 29 (35 balls); MP Stoinis 4/17 (3 overs)	Rose Bowl, Southampton; Umpires: DJ Millns and PA Pollard; Player of the match: MP Stoinis (Kent)
Kent won the toss and chose to bat; Points: Kent 2, Hampshire 0				Rose Bowl, Southampton; Umpires: DJ Millns and PA Pollard; Player of the match: MP Stoinis (Kent)

5 August	Kent (H); 160/5 (20 overs)	v	Gloucestershire; 164/2 (19.2 overs)	Gloucestershire won by 8 wickets (with 4 balls remaining)
Scorecard	Kent (H); 160/5 (20 overs)	v	Gloucestershire; 164/2 (19.2 overs)	St Lawrence Ground, Canterbury; Umpires: IJ Gould and BV Taylor; Player of the match: M Klnger (Gloucestershire)
Scorecard	JL Denly 99* (63 balls); BAC Howell 2/29 (4 overs)		MAH Hammond 51 (31 balls); Imran Qayyum 1/30 (3.1 overs); CJ Haggett 1/30 (4 overs)	St Lawrence Ground, Canterbury; Umpires: IJ Gould and BV Taylor; Player of the match: M Klnger (Gloucestershire)
Kent won the toss and chose to bat; Points: Kent 0, Gloucestershire 2				St Lawrence Ground, Canterbury; Umpires: IJ Gould and BV Taylor; Player of the match: M Klnger (Gloucestershire)

10 August	Sussex (H)	v	Kent	No result (match abandoned without a toss)
Scorecard	Sussex (H)	v	Kent	County Ground, Hove; Umpires: NL Bainton and GD Lloyd
No toss; No play due to heavy rain and flooding; Points: Sussex 1, Kent 1				County Ground, Hove; Umpires: NL Bainton and GD Lloyd

12 August	Middlesex; 189/7 (20 overs)	v	Kent (H); 191/7 (19.3 overs)	Kent won by 3 wickets (with 3 balls remaining)
Scorecard	Middlesex; 189/7 (20 overs)	v	Kent (H); 191/7 (19.3 overs)	County Cricket Ground, Beckenham; Umpires: PR Pollard and RT Robinson; Player of the match: AJ Blake (Kent)
Scorecard	DJ Malan 36 (19 balls); JL Denly 3/25 (4 overs)		DJ Bell-Drummond 62 (41); JAR Harris 3/32 (4 overs)	County Cricket Ground, Beckenham; Umpires: PR Pollard and RT Robinson; Player of the match: AJ Blake (Kent)
Kent won the toss and chose to field; Points: Kent 2, Middlesex Z Crawley made his Twenty20 debut				County Cricket Ground, Beckenham; Umpires: PR Pollard and RT Robinson; Player of the match: AJ Blake (Kent)

16 August	Kent (H); 231/5 (20 overs)	v	Somerset; 226/5 (20 overs)	Kent won by 5 runs
Scorecard	Kent (H); 231/5 (20 overs)	v	Somerset; 226/5 (20 overs)	St Lawrence Ground, Canterbury; Umpires: MA Gough and BV Taylor; Player of the match: SW Billings (Kent)
Scorecard	SW Billings 57* (35 balls); MTC Waller 2/29 (4 overs)		SM Davies 45 (25 balls); Imran Qayyum 1/18 (2 overs)	St Lawrence Ground, Canterbury; Umpires: MA Gough and BV Taylor; Player of the match: SW Billings (Kent)
Somerset won the toss and decided to field; Points: Kent 2, Somerset 0 Kent's total included six penalty runs imposed because Somerset did not bowl all of their overs in the allocated time period. The total equalled Kent's highest total in T20 matches Kent progressed to the quarter-finals G Stewart made his Twenty20 debut				St Lawrence Ground, Canterbury; Umpires: MA Gough and BV Taylor; Player of the match: SW Billings (Kent)

17 August	Essex (H); 201/6 (20 overs)	v	Kent; 203/5 (19.5 overs)	Kent won by 5 wickets (with 1 ball remaining)
Scorecard	Essex (H); 201/6 (20 overs)	v	Kent; 203/5 (19.5 overs)	County Ground, Chelmsford; Umpires: ID Blackwell and JH Evans; Player of the match: DJ Bell-Drummond (Kent)
Scorecard	AJA Wheater 40 (26 balls); CJ Haggett 2/26 (4 overs)		DJ Bell-Drummond 80 (51 balls); RS Bopara 1/22 (4 overs)	County Ground, Chelmsford; Umpires: ID Blackwell and JH Evans; Player of the match: DJ Bell-Drummond (Kent)
Kent won the toss and decided to field; Points: Essex 0, Kent 2				County Ground, Chelmsford; Umpires: ID Blackwell and JH Evans; Player of the match: DJ Bell-Drummond (Kent)

==== Quarter-final ====
23 August	Kent (H); 133/9 (20 overs)	v	Lancashire; 134/4 (18.4 overs)	Lancashire won by 6 wickets (with 8 balls remaining)
Scorecard	Kent (H); 133/9 (20 overs)	v	Lancashire; 134/4 (18.4 overs)	St Lawrence Ground, Canterbury; Umpires: M Burns and AG Wharf; Player of the match: MW Parkinson (Lancashire)
Scorecard	SW Billings 37 (37 balls); MW Parkinson 3/27 (4 overs)		KK Jennings 46 (40 balls); Imran Qayyum 2/17 (4 overs)	St Lawrence Ground, Canterbury; Umpires: M Burns and AG Wharf; Player of the match: MW Parkinson (Lancashire)
Kent won the toss and chose to bat; Lancashire progressed to the semi-finals Imran Qayyum set his highest score in T20 cricket with 21 not out				St Lawrence Ground, Canterbury; Umpires: M Burns and AG Wharf; Player of the match: MW Parkinson (Lancashire)
