= Imran Qayyum =

English cricketer

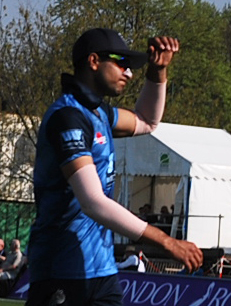
- Imran Qayyum fielding for Kent at Beckenham, 2019

Personal information
- Full name: Imran Qayyum
- Born: 23 May 1993 (age 33); Ealing, Greater London
- Batting: Right-handed
- Bowling: Slow left-arm orthodox
- Role: Bowler

Domestic team information
- Years: Team
- 2016–2020: Kent (squad no. 11)
- FC debut: 15 May 2016 Kent v Northamptonshire
- LA debut: 25 January 2017 Kent v Leeward Islands

Career statistics
Competition	FC	LA	T20
Matches	6	29	45
Runs scored	55	99	51
Batting average	11.00	7.61	17.00
100s/50s	0/0	0/0	0/0
Top score	39	26*	21*
Balls bowled	823	1,368	860
Wickets	12	29	45
Bowling average	43.66	40.62	25.73
5 wickets in innings	0	0	1
10 wickets in match	0	0	0
Best bowling	3/158	4/33	5/21
Catches/stumpings	3/–	5/–	8/–
- Source: CricInfo, 8 October 2020

Imran Qayyum (born 23 May 1993) is an English former professional cricketer who played for Kent County Cricket Club. A slow left-arm bowler, he made his first-class cricket debut in May 2016 against Northamptonshire in the 2016 County Championship and has gone on to play in limited overs competitions for the county. In May 2021, he was forced to retire from the game due to a shoulder injury.

== Early life and youth career ==
Imran Qayyum was born in Ealing and played youth cricket for Middlesex. His parents had migrated from Pakistan before he was born. He was educated at Villiers High School in Southall, Greenford Sixth Form College and City University. After being spotted bowling in a Club Cricket Conference competition by Kent's spin bowling coach Min Patel, he took part in pre-season training with the Kent team ahead of the 2013 season but did not join the team at that point. During the 2013 season he played as a trialist in Second XI cricket for Northamptonshire and Sussex when, after playing against Kent's Second XI, he was contacted by Simon Willis, the director of the county's cricket academy at the time, and invited to play for Kent. He appeared for Kent's Second XI for the remainder of the 2013 season as well as making an appearance for Unicorns A. During the 2013 English off-season he won a week scholarship at the Global Cricket School in Pune in India.

He signed his first professional contract with Kent in 2014. After time developing his game in Pakistan in the 2014–15 off-season his was extended during August 2015. During the 2015 English season Imran was the leading wicket-taker for Kent in the Second XI Championship, with 29 wickets, including 5/18 against Surrey Second XI. During the 2015–16 off-season Imran played grade cricket in Sydney for Fairfield and Liverpool as part of an ECB initiative to develop young spin bowlers before captaining Bromley Cricket Club’s First XI in the Kent Cricket League in 2016 and playing for Victoria Cricket Club in South Africa during the 2016–17 English winter.

== Cricket career ==
Imran Qayyum made his first-class cricket debut on 15 May 2016 for Kent against Northamptonshire in the 2016 County Championship at Wantage Road. He took three wickets on his debut and was dismissed first ball in his only innings. Imran was 23 when he made his debut, having previously been involved with three other county teams.

He made his List A debut for Kent on 25 January 2017 against the Leeward Islands in the 2016–17 Regional Super50 tournament in Antigua, going on to make five appearances for Kent in the tournament. Imran made his domestic List A debut for Kent in the final match of the county's 2017 Royal London One Day Cup campaign in May against Essex at Canterbury before making his Twenty20 debut in July in the 2017 NatWest t20 Blast against Gloucestershire at the College Ground, Cheltenham, taking a wicket on debut and bowling "particularly well" from the Chapel End of the ground before going on to take two wickets for 19 runs in the return match at Canterbury.

Imran took his first five-wicket haul in a 2019 t20 Blast match against Somerset in July 2019. All five wickets fell during a spell of 25 balls during which Somerset lost six wickets – Imran taking five and also running out another batsman – in what was described as a "brilliant all-round display".

Following a shoulder injury, Imran retired from all forms of cricket in May 2021.
