= Zak Crawley =

English cricketer

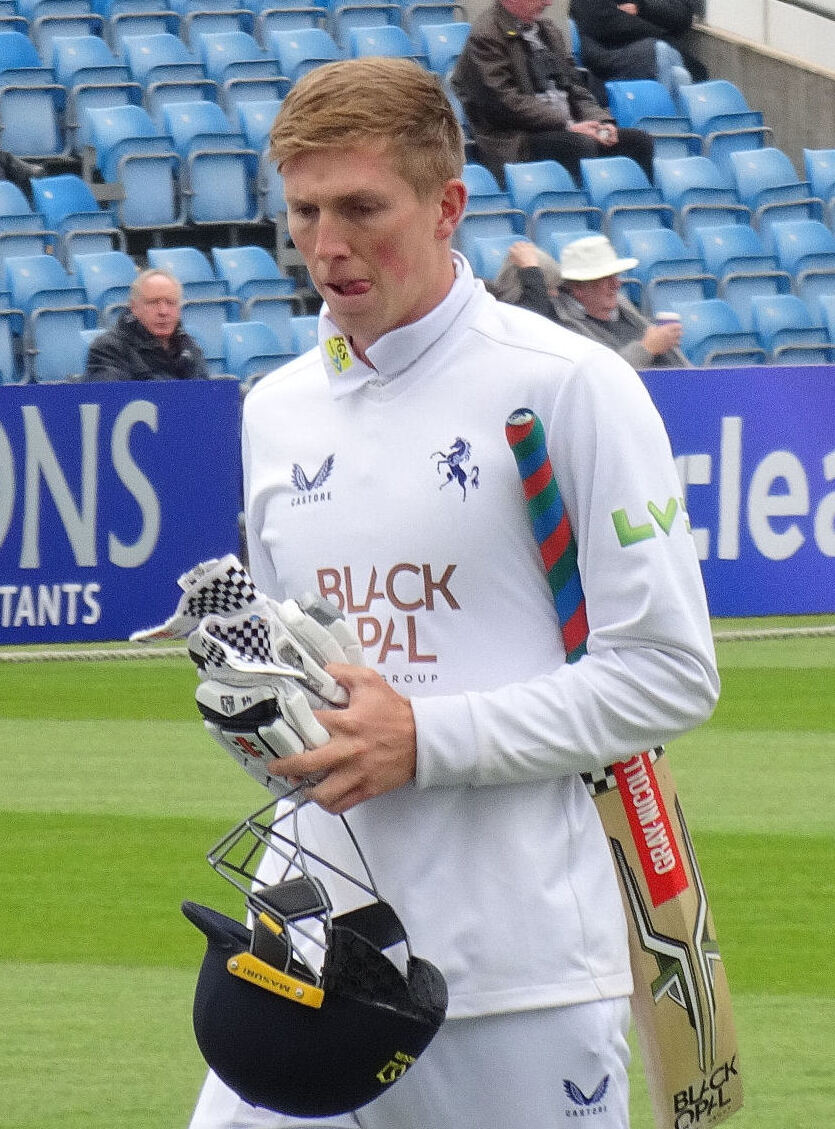
- Crawley in 2022

Personal information
- Born: 3 February 1998 (age 28); Bromley, London, England
- Height: 6 ft 5 in (196 cm)
- Batting: Right-handed
- Bowling: Right-arm off-break
- Role: Top-order batter

International information
- National side: England (2019–present)
- Test debut (cap 695): 29 November 2019 v New Zealand
- Last Test: 4 January 2026 v Australia
- ODI debut (cap 260): 8 July 2021 v Pakistan
- Last ODI: 22 January 2026 v Sri Lanka
- ODI shirt no.: 6

Domestic team information
- Years: Team
- 2015–present: Kent
- 2021–2023: London Spirit
- 2022/23: Hobart Hurricanes
- 2023/24: Perth Scorchers
- 2024/25: Sunrisers Eastern Cape
- 2025: Northern Superchargers (squad no. 15)

Career statistics
Competition	Test	ODI	FC	LA
Matches	64	9	151	32
Runs scored	3,586	205	8,445	948
Batting average	31.18	25.62	31.62	32.68
100s/50s	5/21	0/2	12/51	1/6
Top score	267	58*	267	120
Catches/stumpings	70/–	8/–	141/–	19/–
- Source: Cricinfo, 27 September 2026

Zak Crawley (born 3 February 1998) is an English international cricketer who plays Test and One Day International (ODI) matches for England. A right-handed top-order batter, Crawley also captained the team in two ODIs against Ireland in 2023. Domestically, he plays for Kent County Cricket Club.

Crawley made his international debut in November 2019 during England's tour of New Zealand. After scoring 267 runs in 2020, he was named one of the Wisden Cricketers of the Year in the 2021 edition of the almanack. His mentor is former Kent captain Rob Key, the Director of Men's Cricket for the England and Wales Cricket Board.

== Early life ==
Crawley was born in Bromley in Kent, and was educated at New Beacon School in Sevenoaks and Tonbridge School. His father Terry is a retired City of London futures trader. Terry began his working life as a carpet fitter before becoming one of Britain's highest-paid men, making the Sunday Times Rich List following his career change.

Crawley has represented Kent from the under-11 level onwards, is a graduate of the Kent Cricket Academy, and has played club cricket for Holmesdale, Knockholt, and Sevenoaks Vine. He made his Second XI debut for Kent in 2013 at age 15. At the end of the 2015 season, he signed his first professional contract with the club. By that time, he had become a regular Second XI player and was selected for the England Elite Player Development programme for London. During the 2016–17 English winter, Crawley played Western Australian Grade Cricket for Wembley Districts.

== Cricket career ==
Crawley made his senior debut for Kent in the 2017 Royal London Cup against Essex at Canterbury on 17 May 2017. He made his first-class debut against a touring West Indies side on 6 August 2017 during the 166th Canterbury Cricket Week, scoring 62 runs in his first innings. He then made his County Championship debut for Kent at the end of the same month. After playing four Championship matches during the tail end of the season, he signed a contract extension in October 2017.

Crawley was part of the Kent squad for the 2017–18 Regional Super50 competition in the West Indies in early 2018. He scored his maiden List A half-century in Kent's opening match against Guyana, finishing with 60 runs as an opening batsman. He then scored 99 not out against the Leeward Islands in the county's third match of the tournament. The match ended controversially when the Leeward Islands bowled wide balls, which some viewed as an attempt to deny Crawley his century.

During the 2018 season, Crawley became a regular in the Kent team, playing in all of the team's first-class matches as well as occasional limited-overs games. He was Kent's third-highest run-scorer in the County Championship, with 755 runs at an average of 31.46. After twice being dismissed in the 90s, he scored his maiden first-class century in the final home match of the season, making 168 against Glamorgan at Canterbury in September. He signed a contract extension at the end of the season before playing New South Wales Grade cricket during the 2018/19 winter. Playing for Sydney Cricket Club, he set a new record for the fastest century scored in the competition, making 100 from 42 balls in the T20 Cup against Sutherland District Cricket Club.

Crawley was drafted by London Spirit for the inaugural season of The Hundred but only featured once, scoring 64 as an opening batsman in a loss to Birmingham Phoenix. He was retained for the 2022 season. He also played for the Hobart Hurricanes in the 2022–23 Big Bash League, scoring a half-century on debut in his first appearance in an overseas franchise league.

=== International call-up ===
Despite averaging less than 35 runs per innings in county cricket in 2018 and 2019, Crawley was seen as a potential international batsman. Following a series of good batting performances at the start of the 2019 season, including scoring two centuries, Crawley made his England Lions debut in a four-day match against Australia A in July at Canterbury, the first time he had played for any England team. He scored 820 County Championship runs during the season and, in September 2019, was named in the England's Test match squad for their 2019/20 tour of New Zealand, one of four uncapped players included in the squad for the tour. After scoring a century in a warm-up match, Crawley was brought into the team for the second Test following an injury to Jos Buttler, making his debut at Seddon Park on 29 November aged 21.

After scoring only one run on debut, batting at number 6, he was retained in the squad for the tour of South Africa in December and January. Following an injury to opening batsman Rory Burns, Crawley made his second Test appearance in the second Test against South Africa, this time opening the batting. He was praised for his temperament and approach although some technical issues with his batting were also commented on. He made scores of 4 and 25 in the match, but also took two catches during the final innings of the match. He went on to play in the remaining two matches of the series, scoring his first Test half-century in the final test.

=== International arrival in 2020 ===
Crawley signed a three-year contract extension with Kent in March 2020. In May, he was named in a group of 55 players to begin training ahead of international fixtures during the COVID-19 pandemic and in June was included in England's 30-man squad to start training behind closed doors for the Test series against the West Indies. He played in the first two Tests of the summer, scoring 76 in the second innings of the first Test to increase his Test match highest score, before playing in the second Test against Pakistan in August, scoring a half-century in a rain-affected match.

He went on to make his maiden Test century in the following match, his eighth Test match, scoring 171 not out on the first day, passing his previous best first-class score in the process. On the second day of the match, Crawley went on to score 267 runs before being stumped, an innings which included a new England record fifth wicket partnership of 359 runs with Jos Buttler. Crawley's 267 became the second-highest maiden century scored by an England batsman in Test cricket, behind R. E. Foster's 287, and he became the third-youngest double centurion for England. Crawley's performances during 2020 led to him being named as one of the Wisden Cricketers of the Year in the 2021 edition of the almanack. Crawley is a top-order batsman who has been described as "very strong" technically and as a "natural stroke maker".

Crawley's long-standing mentor is former Kent captain Rob Key. Key has coached Crawley and the pair aim to meet regularly throughout the cricket season. During the 2020 summer Crawley credited the work he had done with Key in helping his development, saying "I do as much as work as I can ... during the summers."

=== Inconsistent international form in 2021 and 2022 ===
The following winter, Crawley was selected for the England tours of Sri Lanka and India. In the lead up to the Indian series, he sprained his wrist after slipping while exiting the dressing room and missed the first two matches. He returned to the team for the third Test, top-scoring with 53 runs in England's first innings before playing in the home series against New Zealand. His batting in the series included three innings of fewer than five runs, with his best innings a score of 17 runs.

Following the forced isolation of most of the England One Day International (ODI) squad after a COVID-19 outbreak, Crawley was named in the revised squad for their series against the touring Pakistanis in July 2021. He made his ODI debut in the first match of the series, scoring an unbeaten half-century. In Test matches, however, Crawley's form with the bat remained poor in 2021, and his 16 innings during the year saw 11 single-figure scores and a Test batting average for the year of 10.81.

He lost his place in the team during the summer, but his central contract was renewed and he was retained in the squad for the 2021–22 Ashes series in Australia. He was recalled to the team for the Boxing Day Test at Melbourne, the third of the series, after England had batted poorly in the first matches of the tour, although he scored poorly in the match. A score of 77 runs from 100 balls in the fourth Test saw him retain his place for the remainder of the five-match series, and he was selected to tour the West Indies in early 2022.

Crawley scored his second Test century during the first match of the West Indies tour, and his innings of 121 saw Viv Richards describe him as "a magnificent player". However, his performances in the other two matches of the series led to critics questioning his shot selection, especially outside off stump, highlighting a tendency to get out playing the off drive when the ball is swinging.

After being selected in the Test match squad for England's tour of Pakistan in late 2022, the team's first Test match tour of Pakistan since 2005, Crawley opened the batting in the first match. He was one of four England batsmen to score a century in their first innings, coming close to becoming the first England player to score a century before lunch on day one. Scoring rapidly on a "very flat pitch", he made 122 runs and reached his century in 86 balls, setting a record for the fastest century by an England Test opener. He scored a half-century in similar style in the second innings and played in each of the remaining matches in the series.

=== 2023 Ashes ===
After being under pressure as a result of his lack of consistent runs, Crawley was selected in England's squad for the 2023 Ashes. He was England's top scorer during the series, scoring 480 runs at an average of over 50, including a score of 189 in the fourth Test at Old Trafford.

In the opening Test of the 2025 summer against Zimbabwe at Trent Bridge, Crawley scored his fifth Test century.

Crawley was selected in England's squad for the 2025 Ashes. He was selected in all five tests in the series, which concluded with Australia defeating England 4–1. He scored 273 runs at an average of 27.30, the third highest of any England batsman. His poor form in the series made his Test place vulnerable for the upcoming summer.

Following his poor form in the 2026 County Championship, with a high score of 44, Crawley was dropped from the England Test squad for the Crowe–Thorpe Trophy. Following his dropping from the squad, Crawley elected to sit out two County Championship games for Kent, having failed to reach 50 in the season. Crawley was appointed captain of Sunrisers Leeds for the 2026 The Hundred season.
