= Harry Podmore =

English cricketer (born 1994)

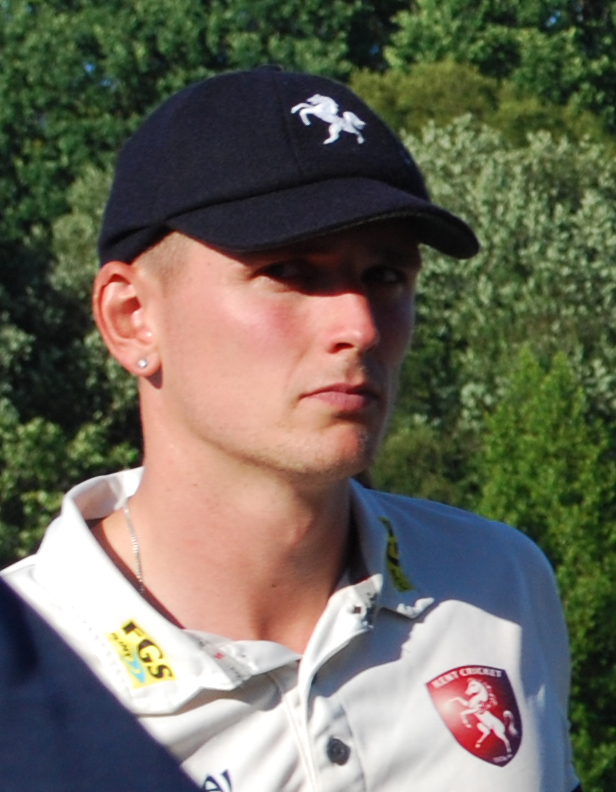
- Podmore playing for Kent at Tunbridge Wells, June 2018

Personal information
- Full name: Harry William Podmore
- Born: 23 July 1994 (age 32); Hammersmith, London, England
- Batting: Right-handed
- Bowling: Right-arm medium-fast
- Role: Bowler

Domestic team information
- Years: Team
- 2014–2017: Middlesex (squad no. 23)
- 2016: → Glamorgan (loan)
- 2017: → Glamorgan (loan)
- 2017: → Derbyshire (loan)
- 2018–2022: Kent (squad no. 1)
- 2023–2024: Glamorgan (squad no. 23)
- FC debut: 1 May 2016 Glamorgan v Kent
- LA debut: 31 July 2014 Middlesex v Surrey

Career statistics
Competition	FC	LA	T20
Matches	56	29	24
Runs scored	1,057	184	37
Batting average	17.61	14.15	5.28
100s/50s	0/4	0/0	0/0
Top score	66*	40	9
Balls bowled	9,220	1,306	433
Wickets	171	28	23
Bowling average	27.92	48.14	28.91
5 wickets in innings	4	0	0
10 wickets in match	0	0	0
Best bowling	6/36	4/57	3/13
Catches/stumpings	14/–	6/–	9/–
- Source: Cricinfo, 19 August 2024

Harry William Podmore (born 23 July 1994) is a retired English professional cricketer who played for Glamorgan County Cricket Club. A right-arm medium-fast bowler who bats right-handed, he played youth cricket for Middlesex and made his debut for the county in 2014 before spending time on loan with Glamorgan, Durham and Derbyshire over the next two seasons. He made his first-class cricket debut on 1 May 2016 in the 2016 County Championship and played for Kent between 2018 and 2022; he was awarded his county cap in 2019 and left the county at the end of the 2022 season, moving to Glamorgan.

== Early life ==
Podmore was born at Hammersmith and educated at Twyford High School. He began playing cricket at Ealing Cricket Club and played for Middlesex from under-15 level onwards, as part of the Middlesex Academy in 2011 and 2012. He was part of the MCC Young Cricketers programme at Lord's and signed his first professional contract with Middlesex in September 2013.

== Senior cricket career ==
Podmore made his Middlesex debut as a 19-year old in the 2014 NatWest t20 Blast against Essex, after a poor run of results for the team led to changes in the team. Podmore took his opportunity as Middlesex's lead bowlers were kept out of the T20 team during the summer and went on to play in the 2014 Royal London One-Day Cup 50 over competition later in the season. After taking 13 wickets in the same number of matches he extended his contract with Middlesex at the end of the season. He played in only five T20 matches the following season for the First XI, but took 42 wickets for the Middlesex Second XI and his contract was once again extended at the end of the season.

At the start of the 2016 season, Podmore joined Glamorgan on loan for the first six games of the 2016 County Championship season. He played in four County Championship matches for the Welsh county, making his first-class debut against Kent at the St Lawrence Ground in Canterbury at the beginning of May. After returning to Middlesex he made four County Championship appearances for the county as they won the Championship.

In April 2017 he returned to Glamorgan on loan, playing twice for the county before returning to Middlesex. After playing four one-day matches for Middlesex, he briefly joined Durham on loan during August 2017 to play for their Second XI with the possibility of a permanent move, before joining Derbyshire on a 28-day loan later the same month.

After the 2017 season Podmore had surgery to release a trapped nerve in his bowling elbow and spent time in South Africa playing for Union Cricket Club in Port Elizabeth. In April 2018 Podmore left Middlesex to join Kent on what was reported to be a three-year contract. Podmore had an agreement with Middlesex that he could move to another county if a suitable contract became available.

Podmore's first season with Kent was branded as "successful". He played in each of Kent's County Championship matches, taking 43 County Championship wickets at an average of 23.30 runs per wicket. He was the county's second leading wicket-taker in the Championship as the team won promotion from Division Two and took his best first-class figures of 6/36 against Middlesex, his first five-wicket haul. At the end of the season he signed a contract extension, keeping him under contract at Kent until the end of the 2021 season.

Having joined Glamorgan before the start of the 2023 season, Podmore announced his retirement from professional cricket in August 2024.
