= Ivan Thomas =

English cricketer (born 1991)

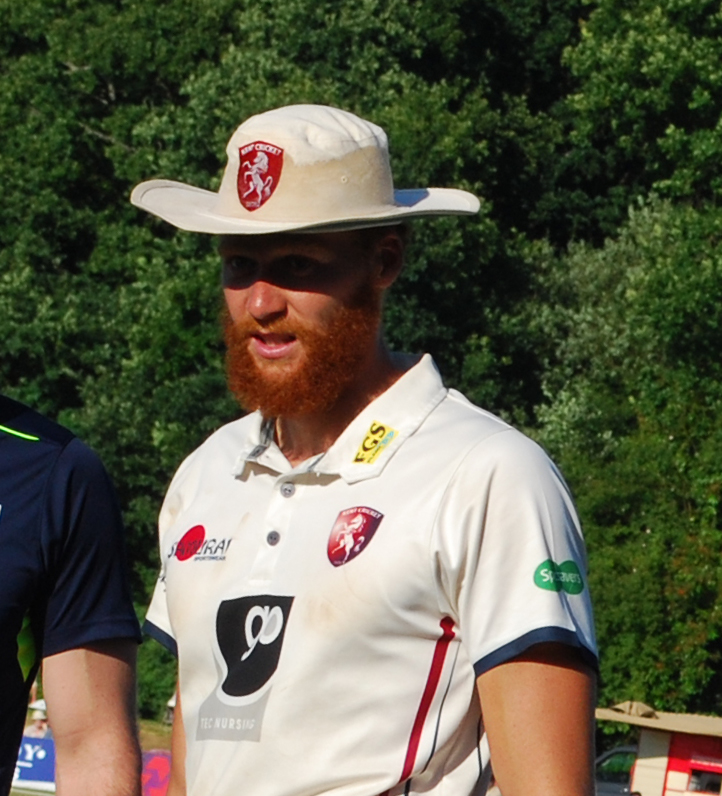
- Thomas at Tunbridge Wells, June 2018

Personal information
- Full name: Ivan Alfred Astley Thomas
- Born: 25 September 1991 (age 35); Greenwich, Greater London
- Height: 6 ft 4 in (1.93 m)
- Batting: Right-handed
- Bowling: Right-arm medium-fast
- Role: Bowler

Domestic team information
- Years: Team
- 2012–2014: Leeds/Bradford MCCU
- 2012–2020: Kent (squad no. 5)
- FC debut: 31 March 2012 Leeds/Bradford MCCU v Surrey
- LA debut: 27 August 2014 Kent v New Zealand A

Career statistics
Competition	FC	LA	T20
Matches	35	21	12
Runs scored	117	18	3
Batting average	5.08	6.00	3.00
100s/50s	0/0	0/0	0/0
Top score	13	6	3*
Balls bowled	4,339	1,036	210
Wickets	74	31	9
Bowling average	30.54	31.09	35.55
5 wickets in innings	1	0	0
10 wickets in match	0	0	0
Best bowling	5/91	4/30	2/42
Catches/stumpings	9/–	8/–	4/–
- Source: CricInfo, 10 August 2020

Ivan Alfred Astley Thomas (born 25 September 1991) is an English professional cricketer who most recently played for Kent County Cricket Club. He is a right-arm medium-fast seam bowler who bats right-handed. He made his first-class cricket debut for Leeds/Bradford MCC Universities in March 2012 and has played in all forms of cricket for Kent.

== Early life and youth career ==
Thomas was born in Greenwich and attended The John Roan School in Blackheath. He played youth cricket for Blackheath Cricket Club and for Kent before going to Leeds University to study Sports Science. At university he was part of the Leeds/Bradford MCC Universities cricket team. A series of back injuries in his late teens, including a triple-stress fracture of his back, threatened Thomas' career. He has credited Pilates and other core strength exercises with helping to save his career.

== Cricket career ==
Thomas made his first-class cricket debut for Leeds/Bradford MCC Universities in March 2012 in a match against Surrey. He played six first-class matches for the team between 2012 and 2014 as well as playing in MCC Universities competitions.

Thomas made his Kent debut in May 2012 against Essex in the 2012 County Championship. He made a second appearance for Kent against the touring South Africans later in the season. A variety of injury concerns limited his Kent appearances in 2013 and 2014, but in 2015 he played more regularly for the team, making 11 first-class appearances as well as appearing in List A cricket and Twenty20 matches for the county and signing a contract extension in August.

During the 2014–15 English winter Thomas played for Sunshine Coast Scorchers in Brisbane Grade Cricket in Queensland. During the 2015–16 off-season he cycled from Land's End to John O'Groats, raising more than £4,000 for the charity Cardiac Risk in the Young.

During the 2018 season Thomas played regularly in the Kent team, especially in the County Championship where he played in 11 matches, taking 24 wickets at a bowling average of 26.25 runs per wicket. Against Middlesex in June he was part of a century partnership for the last Kent wicket with Grant Stewart, Thomas contributing just a single run in the 36 balls he faced. This was the first time a batsman had scored only one run as part of a century partnership in England and only the second time this had occurred in first-class cricket anywhere.

Towards the end of the season he tore his anterior cruciate ligament in training and underwent surgery in September to reconstruct the ligament with the expectation that he would be unable to play cricket for six to nine months. Despite his injury, Thomas was signed a new contract with the county during the 2018–19 off-season, although he did not play a match during the 2019 season. He appeared in Kent's Bob Willis Trophy team during the shortened 2020 season before leaving the club at the end of the season.
