= Adam Riley =

English cricketer (born 1992)

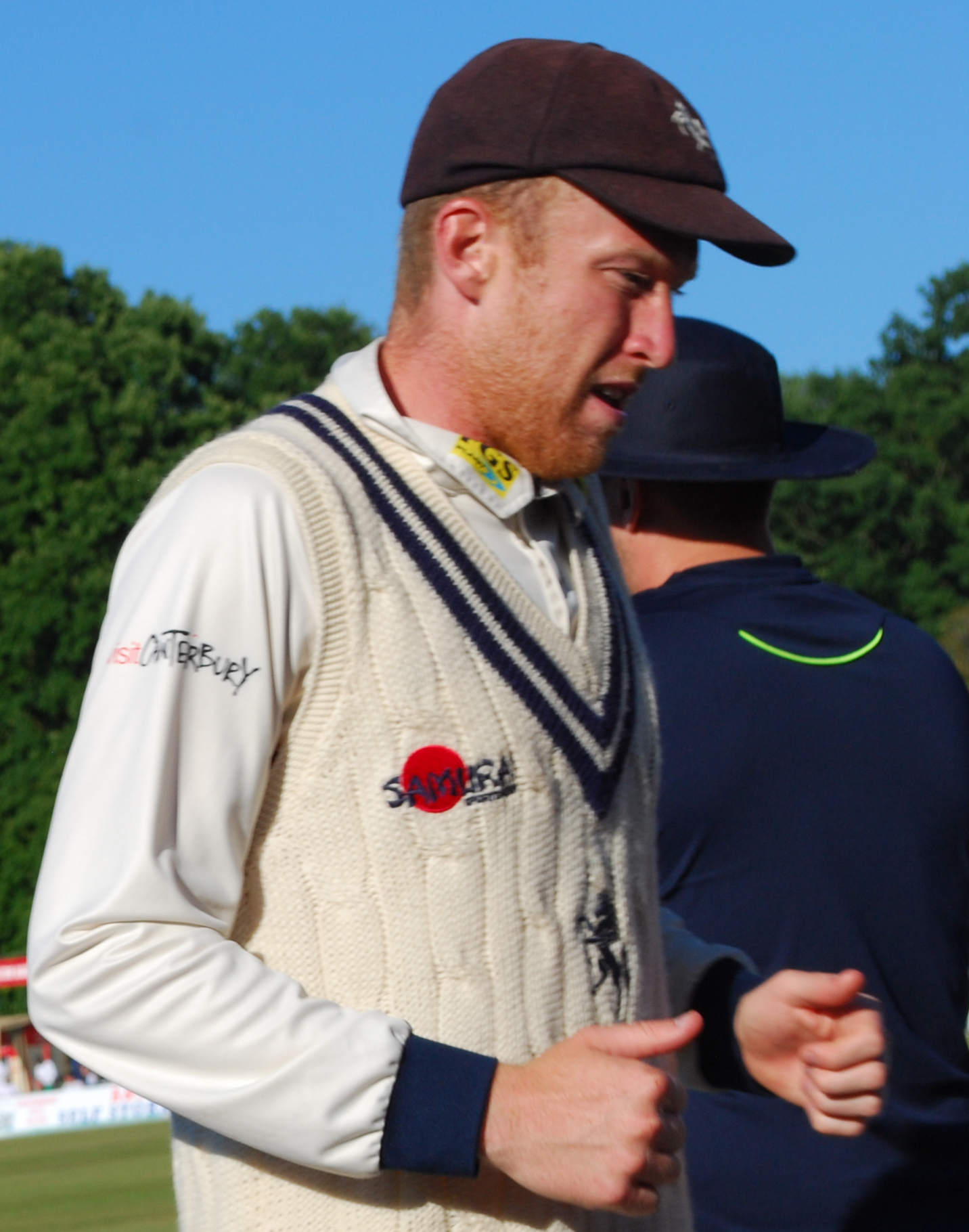
- Riley at Tunbridge Wells in June 2018

Personal information
- Full name: Adam Edward Nicholas Riley
- Born: 23 March 1992 (age 34); Sidcup, Greater London
- Height: 6 ft 2 in (1.88 m)
- Batting: Right-handed
- Bowling: Right-arm off break
- Role: Bowler

Domestic team information
- Years: Team
- 2011–2019: Kent (squad no. 33)
- 2012–2014: Loughborough MCCU
- FC debut: 4 May 2011 Kent v Northamptonshire
- Last FC: 20 May 2019 Kent v Surrey
- LA debut: 1 May 2011 Kent v Worcestershire
- Last LA: 27 April 2019 Kent v Pakistanis

Career statistics
Competition	FC	LA	T20
Matches	61	34	29
Runs scored	495	71	18
Batting average	10.53	8.87	6.00
100s/50s	0/0	0/0	0/0
Top score	34	21*	5*
Balls bowled	8,061	1,326	532
Wickets	128	32	23
Bowling average	37.31	35.84	29.86
5 wickets in innings	5	0	0
10 wickets in match	0	0	0
Best bowling	7/150	4/40	4/22
Catches/stumpings	37/–	11/–	5/–
- Source: CricInfo, 23 May 2019

Adam Edward Nicholas Riley (born 23 March 1992) is an English former professional cricketer who played for Kent County Cricket Club between 2011 and 2019. Riley played as an off break bowler who also played for the England Lions team and for Loughborough MCC University.

== Early life ==
Riley was born at Sidcup in the London Borough of Bexley. He was educated at Beths Grammar School in Bexley before studying Geography and Sports Management at Loughborough University. He played cricket for both Kent and the Loughborough MCC University team whilst a student.

== Cricket career ==
Riley made his first-class cricket debut for Kent against Northamptonshire in the 2011 County Championship. He took his maiden first-class five wicket haul against Loughborough MCCU, taking figures of 5/76 during the season. Riley also made his List A cricket debut against Worcestershire in the 2011 Clydesdale Bank 40. as well as his Twenty20 cricket debut against the touring Indians.

In June 2013, Riley took seven wickets for 150 runs in a County Championship match against Hampshire.

Riley left Kent by "mutual consent" in June 2019 after nine seasons with the county. The England coaching setup had intervened to change his delivery during a training camp in 2015 and, despite a number of attempts to revert to his previous, effective action, which was described as having been "very fluid" with "the ability to bowl spin with good pace, control, guile, dip", he had been unable to recover his form. After leaving county cricket he moved to work at Dulwich College as its head of player development at the end of 2019 as well as continuing to work coaching Kent's under-15 team.

== Career Best Performances ==
	Batting				Bowling (innings)			
	Score	Fixture	Venue	Season	Figures	Fixture	Venue	Season
First-class	34	Kent v Derbyshire	Canterbury	2015	7/150	Kent v Hampshire	Southampton	2013
List A	21 not out	Kent v Leeward Islands	Coolidge Cricket Ground, Antigua	2016/17	4/40	Kent v Leeward Islands	Coolidge Cricket Ground, Antigua	2017/18
Twenty20	5 not out	Kent v Essex	Canterbury	2012	4/22	Kent v Gloucestershire	Canterbury	2014
