= Calum Haggett =

English cricketer

Personal information
- Full name: Calum John Haggett
- Born: 30 October 1990 (age 36); Taunton, Somerset
- Height: 6 ft 3 in (1.91 m)
- Batting: Left-handed
- Bowling: Right-arm medium
- Role: All-rounder

Domestic team information
- Years: Team
- 2011: Somerset
- 2013–2020: Kent (squad no. 25)
- 2021: Devon
- FC debut: 10 April 2013 Kent v Cardiff MCCU
- LA debut: 27 May 2013 Kent v Netherlands

Career statistics
Competition	FC	LA	T20
Matches	41	38	35
Runs scored	926	337	113
Batting average	22.58	16.85	18.83
100s/50s	0/2	0/0	0/0
Top score	80	45	20
Balls bowled	5,884	1,682	588
Wickets	89	47	28
Bowling average	33.79	35.36	32.75
5 wickets in innings	0	0	0
10 wickets in match	0	0	0
Best bowling	4/15	4/59	2/12
Catches/stumpings	10/–	13/–	5/–
- Source: CricInfo, 12 September 2020

Calum John Haggett (born 30 October 1990) is an English first-class cricketer who played for Kent County Cricket Club. An all-rounder, he bowls right-arm medium pace, and bats left-handed. He made his debut for Somerset in the 2010–11 Caribbean Twenty20 and played three T20 matches but these were the only appearances he made for Somerset. Having previously represented England U19s on their 2009 tour to Bangladesh, Haggett signed for Kent ahead of the 2013 English domestic season.

He was released by Kent at the end of the 2020 season after seven seasons with the team.

== Life and career ==
Haggett was born in Taunton, England on 30 October 1990, Haggett attended Millfield, a private school in Street, Somerset. Having grown up in the village Shapwick, he first represented Somerset at Under 11 level, playing alongside future England international Jos Buttler, but for part of his time with the Somerset Academy Haggett suffered a serious a back injury which prevented him from bowling, although he held his own as a batsman. Haggett made a full recovery from this injury and signed a full contract with Somerset in the summer of 2009. That autumn he was selected to tour Bangladesh with the England Under-19 cricket team where he played one youth test and four youth ODIs, he was then named in the squad for the 2010 ICC Under-19 Cricket World Cup in New Zealand but had to withdraw from the squad, after it was discovered that he had a potentially life-threatening heart problem which required major surgery and which sidelined him for most of the 2010 season. Having made a full recovery Haggett was included in Somerset's squad for the 2010–11 Caribbean Twenty20, and made his debut for the county against Guyana claiming a wicket. Haggett played two more matches in the tournament as Somerset went out in the group stages, after failing to break into the county's first eleven Haggett left the club at the end of the 2011 English cricket season.

In March 2013, Haggett signed for Kent ahead of the 2013 English cricket season. After a season where he averaged over 35 with the bat and took 26 wickets, he signed a new contract for the 2014 season.

After playing in all of Kent's limited-overs matches during the 2018 season, Hagget signed another contract extension after the end of the season, keeping him at Kent until 2020. He did not play at all for the county's first XI in 2019 due to injuries, but returned to the T20 team during the shortened 2020 season before being released at the end of the season. He played minor counties cricket for Devon County Cricket Club in 2021.

== Career Best Performances ==
Updated 8 October 2020

	Batting				Bowling (innings)			
	Score	Fixture	Venue	Season	Figures	Fixture	Venue	Season
FC	80	Kent v Surrey	The Oval	2015	4/15	Kent v Derbyshire	Derby	2016
LA	45	Kent v Leeward islands	Coolidge Cricket Ground, Antigua	2016/17	4/59	Kent v Windward Islands	Coolidge Cricket Ground, Antigua	2016/17
T20	20	Kent v Gloucestershire	Bristol	2018	2/12	Kent v Somerset	Canterbury	2015
