= Matt Hunn =

English cricketer (born 1994)

Personal information
- Full name: Matthew David Hunn
- Born: 22 March 1994 (age 32); Colchester, Essex
- Nickname: Hunny
- Height: 6 ft 4 in (1.93 m)
- Batting: Right-handed
- Bowling: Right-arm fast-medium

Domestic team information
- Years: Team
- 2011–2019: Suffolk
- 2013–2018: Kent (squad no. 14)
- FC debut: 24 September 2013 Kent v Lancashire
- LA debut: 2 August 2015 Kent v Sussex

Career statistics
Competition	FC	LA	T20
Matches	20	7	2
Runs scored	94	7	–
Batting average	18.80	7.00	–
100s/50s	0/0	0/0	–/–
Top score	32*	5*	–
Balls bowled	2,643	288	42
Wickets	46	6	4
Bowling average	35.80	43.00	16.25
5 wickets in innings	1	0	0
10 wickets in match	0	0	0
Best bowling	5/99	2/31	3/30
Catches/stumpings	8/–	2/–	1/–
- Source: CricInfo, 3 April 2018

Matthew David Hunn (born 22 March 1994) is a former English professional cricketer who played for Kent County Cricket Club. He is a right-handed batsman and a right-arm medium-fast bowler.

Hunn went to St Joseph's College in Ipswich. After playing for Suffolk youth teams and some matches for Essex XIs, Hunn joined Kent in 2013 and made his debut the same year. He played in seven Kent Second XI games, claiming 19 wickets.

Hunn made his first-class cricket debut against Lancashire in September 2013. He took 2 wickets for 51 runs on debut. He retained a dual-registration to play for Suffolk, appearing for the team once in the Minor Counties Trophy in 2017 when not required by Kent and plays club cricket for Sandwich Town Cricket Club in the Kent Cricket League. He played in Australia for Newcastle City Cricket Club in New South Wales during the 2014/15 English off-season.

Hunn was released by Kent when his contract expired at the end of the 2018 season to pursue non-cricketing career options. Hunn had only made one appearance for the county First XI in the season and played rarely for the Second XI during his final professional season.
