= Min Patel =

English cricketer

Personal information
- Full name: Minal Mahesh Patel
- Born: 7 July 1970 (age 56); Bombay, India
- Nickname: Diamond
- Height: 5 ft 7 in (1.70 m)
- Batting: Right-handed
- Bowling: Slow left arm orthodox
- Role: Bowler

International information
- National side: England
- Test debut (cap 579): 6 June 1996 v India
- Last Test: 9 July 1996 v India

Domestic team information
- Years: Team
- 1989–2007: Kent (squad no. 77)
- 2005/06: Central Districts

Career statistics
Competition	Tests	FC	LA	T20
Matches	2	208	85	9
Runs scored	45	3,945	269	18
Batting average	22.50	17.37	9.96	6.00
100s/50s	0/0	0/17	0/0	0/0
Top score	27	87	27*	8
Balls bowled	276	44,787	3,648	196
Wickets	1	630	88	15
Bowling average	180.00	30.64	30.69	17.13
5 wickets in innings	0	30	0	0
10 wickets in match	0	9	0	0
Best bowling	1/101	8/96	3/20	4/26
Catches/stumpings	2/–	102/–	24/–	0/–
- Source: ESPNcricinfo, 13 November 2007

Minal Mahesh Patel (born 7 July 1970) is a retired Indian-born English cricketer who made two appearances in Test cricket for the England cricket team. He was a right-handed batsman and a slow left arm bowler, who primarily played for Kent County Cricket Club. As of 2018 he is the Second XI coach at Kent.

Born in Bombay (now called Mumbai), and educated in England at Dartford Grammar School and later Manchester Polytechnic, Patel's first-class cricket debut for Kent came at the end of the 1989 English cricket season, in a match against Middlesex. He became a regular in the Kent team over the following seasons, and in 1994 and 1995 "took wickets for fun"; indeed in 1994 he was the leading wicket-taker in England with 90 at a bowling average of 22.86. Pitches at Kent's home ground, the St Lawrence Ground, began to be prepared specifically for the spin bowling of Patel and Carl Hooper, despite the home team also boasting a seam attack of Alan Igglesden, Martin McCague, Dean Headley and Duncan Spencer.

1996 saw Patel make his Test debut against the country of his birth, India. One of seven players to make their debut in the match at Edgbaston, Patel struggled to make an impact on a green wicket, only bowling ten overs in England's eight wicket win. Left out for the second Test at Lord's, he returned for the third Test at Trent Bridge. Again, Patel struggled on a pitch not suited to spin bowling, however he managed to take his maiden (and last) Test wicket; that of Sanjay Manjrekar, caught by Graeme Hick.

Patel's career looked to be in jeopardy during 1997, when a combination of injuries sustained while teaching PE and whilst batting for his club team ruled him out for most of the season. He returned the following season, and performed consistently for them through the following eight seasons.

Patel joined Central Districts for one season over the winter of 2005/2006, where he proved a useful asset in the team's State Championship victory, taking six wickets in the final. This came after he had been mentioned in relation to a possible recall to the England squad as cover for Ashley Giles on the tour of Pakistan.

Following a recurring elbow injury, he announced his retirement from first-class cricket at the start of the 2008 season.
