= Ned Eckersley =

English cricketer (born 1989)

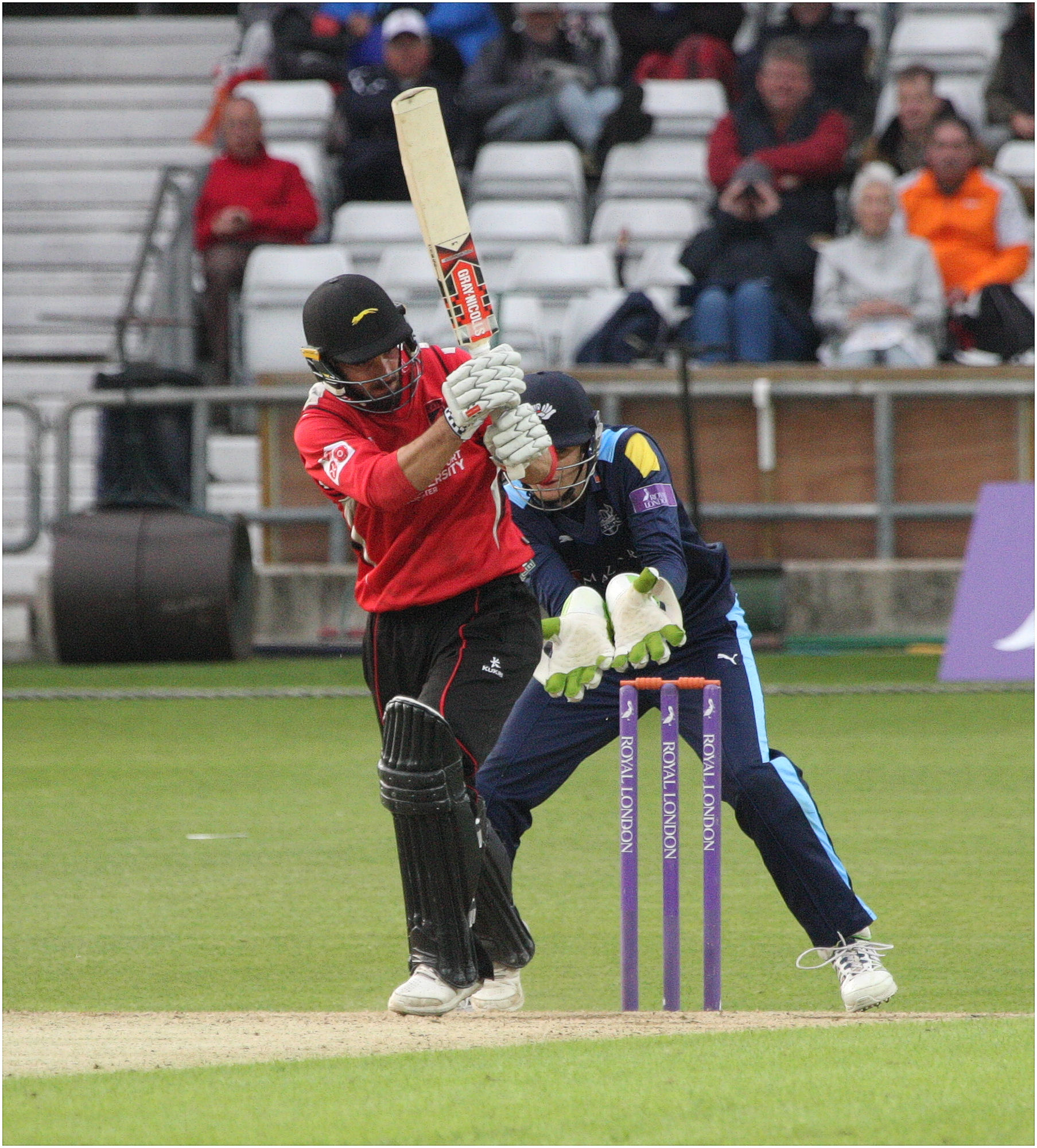
- Eckersley in 2017

Personal information
- Full name: Edmund James Holden Eckersley
- Born: 9 August 1989 (age 37); Oxford, Oxfordshire, England
- Nickname: Jazza
- Height: 5 ft 11 in (1.80 m)
- Batting: Right-handed
- Bowling: Right-arm off break
- Role: Batsman, Wicket-keeper

Domestic team information
- Years: Team
- 2008–2013: Marylebone Cricket Club
- 2010: Unicorns
- 2011–2018: Leicestershire (squad no. 33)
- 2011: Mountaineers
- 2019–2022: Durham (squad no. 66)
- FC debut: 23 August 2011 Leicestershire v Surrey
- LA debut: 1 August 2008 MCC v Bangladesh A

Career statistics
Competition	FC	LA	T20
Matches	139	46	78
Runs scored	7,171	1,091	848
Batting average	32.30	29.48	16.62
100s/50s	16/27	1/5	0/1
Top score	158	108	50*
Balls bowled	112	–	–
Wickets	2	–	–
Bowling average	37.00	–	–
5 wickets in innings	0	–	–
10 wickets in match	0	–	–
Best bowling	2/29	–	–
Catches/stumpings	248/4	28/1	25/7
- Source: CricInfo, 25 September 2021

Edmund John Holden Eckersley (born 9 August 1989) is an English cricketer. He is a right-handed batsman and wicket-keeper. He was a core player of Leicestershire from 2011 to 2018. After his release from Leicestershire he signed for Durham

== Career ==
Eckersley made his List A debut playing for the Marylebone Cricket Club (MCC) in 2008, having previously played for Middlesex Second XI and the MCC Young Cricketers. His debut, against Bangladesh A, saw him make three catches as wicketkeeper, but he only scored one run. As a member of the MCC Young Cricketers squad, he was chosen to perform 12th man duties in the 2009 Ashes Lord's Test and got the opportunity to field on the fourth day.

In 2010, Eckersley was selected as one of 21 players to form the first Unicorns squad to take part in the Clydesdale Bank 40 domestic one day competition against the regular first-class counties. The Unicorns were made up of 15 former county cricket professionals and 6 young cricketers looking to make it in the professional game. In 2011, Eckersley was offered a trial at Leicestershire after some impressive performances in 2010 for the MCC Young Cricketers. He spent most of the season with the Second XI, becoming the team's highest scorer, and was rewarded for this late in the 2011 season with a debut for the Leicestershire First XI, against Surrey at Grace Road. He then followed that up with some solid batting displays against Gloucestershire in particular, making his maiden first-class fifty, and taking four catches as wicketkeeper. He then spent the close season playing for Mountaineers in Zimbabwe.

In the 2012 season he made excellent progress with Leicestershire including a six and a half-hour innings against Glamorgan. His score of 137 not out was part of a second wicket stand of 245 with Michael Thornely, and was a career best for him at the time. He followed this with an extremely successful 2013 season, for which he was named CricInfo's breakthrough player of the season. He topped Leicestershire's first-class batting averages, with 1302 runs at 50.07, nearly twice as many runs as any other Leicestershire player. He made four first-class centuries, plus one score of 108 in a 40-over game, and was rewarded with his county cap in September. His season was mired somewhat, however, on 1 September when both he and Josh Cobb were arrested by police for being drunk and disorderly in Leicester city centre. Both received fines.
