= 2017 One-Day Cup =

2017 Royal London One-Day Cup
- Dates: 27 April – 1 July 2017
- Administrator: England and Wales Cricket Board
- Cricket format: Limited overs cricket (50 overs)
- Tournament format(s): Group stage and knockout
- Champions: Nottinghamshire
- Participants: 18
- Matches: 77
- Most runs: Alastair Cook (636)
- Most wickets: Sam Curran (20)
- Official website: ecb.co.uk

The 2017 Royal London One-Day Cup tournament was a limited overs cricket competition that forms part of the 2017 domestic cricket season in England and Wales. Matches were contested over 50 overs per side and had List A cricket status. All eighteen First-class counties competed in the tournament which ran from the end of April with the final taking place at Lord's on 1 July. Nottinghamshire won the tournament, defeating Surrey in the final. The defending champions were Warwickshire.

The 2017 competition was moved earlier in the season with a reduced knockout stage in order to allow the 2017 NatWest t20 Blast to take place during the school summer holidays and England players to prepare for the 2017 ICC Champions Trophy taking place in England and Wales during June. It followed a similar schedule to the Benson & Hedges Cup competition which was played early in the season and ran from the 1970s until 2002.

The scheduling of the competition earlier during the domestic season was also designed to allow limited overs cricket to be played in two blocks – one for the One Day Cup and one for the T20 Blast. The aim of the England and Wales Cricket Board was to enable county players to develop white-ball skills more effectively, to allow preparation for England matches and to make the cricket schedule easier to understand.

== Format ==
The competition featured two groups of nine teams based on a North–South geographical split. Each team played eight matches during the group stage, playing every other member of their group once. Four matches were played at home venues by each county. The group stage took place from the end of April to the middle of May with the group winners progressing straight to the semi-finals with the second and third placed teams in each group playing a quarter-final against a team from the other group with the winner progressing to one of the semi-final matches.

The competition was paused for the majority of the 2017 ICC Champions Trophy which took place in England and Wales during June, with the quarter-finals and semi-finals taking place between 13 and 17 June. The knock-out stages of the competition resumed towards the end of the Champions Trophy with the final taking place at Lord's on 1 July.

As part of their punishment for accepting a £3.8 million financial aid package from the ECB during the 2016 season, Durham began the 2017 competition with a deduction of two points.

North Group	South Group
Derbyshire	Essex
Durham	Glamorgan
Lancashire	Gloucestershire
Leicestershire	Hampshire
Northamptonshire	Kent
Nottinghamshire	Middlesex
Warwickshire	Somerset
Worcestershire	Surrey
Yorkshire	Sussex

== Group stage ==
The group stage took place from the end of April to the middle of May with each team playing eight matches. The top three teams in each group qualified for the play off stage of the competition.

=== North Group ===
The North Group was won by Worcestershire who won six of their matches and tied one. Yorkshire and Nottinghamshire finished second and third in the group respectively and qualified for the quarter-final stage.

==== Table ====
Pos	Team	Pld	W	L	T	NR	Ded	Pts	NRR
1	Worcestershire Rapids (Note: advanced directly to the semi-finals)	8	6	1	1	0	0	13	0.029
2	Yorkshire Vikings (Note: advanced to the quarter-finals)	8	6	2	0	0	0	12	0.865
3	Notts Outlaws	8	4	3	0	1	0	9	−0.050
4	Lancashire	8	4	4	0	0	0	8	0.198
5	Durham	8	4	3	0	1	2	7	0.240
6	Leicestershire Foxes	8	3	4	0	1	0	7	−0.001
7	Derbyshire	8	2	5	0	1	0	5 (Note: Durham were deducted two points by the ECB for accepting a financial aid package during the 2016 season.)	−0.339
8	Northants Steelbacks	8	1	4	1	2	0	5	−0.720
9	Warwickshire Bears	8	2	6	0	0	0	4	−0.527

==== Fixtures ====
27 April 2017
11:00 BST
Scorecard

Durham (H); 194/2 (34 overs)	v	Derbyshire
Michael Richardson 83* (91); Jeevan Mendis 1/30 (7 overs)

No result
Riverside Ground, Chester-le-Street
Umpires: Michael Gough and Neil Mallender

- Derbyshire won the toss and elected to field.
- A rain delay initially reduced the match to 43 overs per side. The match was abandoned after a second rain delay in Durham's innings.
- Cameron Steel and James Weighell (Durham) both made their List A debuts.
- Points: Durham 1, Derbyshire 1.

27 April 2017
12:30 BST
Scorecard

Northamptonshire (H); 151 (29.4 overs)	v	Warwickshire; 162/0 (26 overs)
Rob Keogh 69* (71); Oliver Hannon-Dalby 3/24 (3.4 overs)		Sam Hain 89* (84)

Warwickshire won by 10 wickets (D/L/S)
County Ground, Northampton
Umpires: David Millns and Tim Robinson
Player of the match: Sam Hain (Warwickshire)

- Warwickshire won the toss and elected to field.
- Rain delays reduced the match to 30 overs per side. Warwickshire's target was revised to 159.
- Grant Thornton (Warwickshire) made his List A debut.
- Points: Warwickshire 2, Northamptonshire 0.

27 April 2017
11:00 BST
Scorecard

Nottinghamshire; 273/6 (50 overs)	v	Worcestershire (H); 169/5 (20 overs)
Michael Lumb 104 (126); Joe Leach 3/50 (10 overs)		Ross Whiteley 41* (19); Jake Ball 2/42 (4 overs)

Worcestershire won by 5 wickets (D/L/S)
New Road, Worcester
Umpires: Rob Bailey and Billy Taylor

- Worcestershire won the toss and elected to field.
- Rain delays reduced Worcestershire's innings to 22 overs. The target was revised to 168.
- Billy Root (Nottinghamshire) made his List A debut.
- Points: Worcestershire 2, Nottinghamshire 0.

28 April 2017
14:00 BST (D/N)
Scorecard

Lancashire (H); 314/8 (50 overs)	v	Leicestershire; 311/7 (48.2 overs)
Haseeb Hameed 88 (101); James Sykes 4/57 (10 overs)		Mark Cosgrove 67 (66); Liam Livingstone 2/51 (10 overs)

Leicestershire won by 3 wickets (D/L/S)
Old Trafford, Greater Manchester
Umpires: Paul Baldwin and Peter Hartley

- Lancashire won the toss and elected to bat.
- Rain delays reduced Leicestershire's innings to 49 overs. The target was revised to 309.
- Haseeb Hameed (Lancashire) made his List A debut.
- Points: Leicestershire 2, Lancashire 0.

29 April 2017
11:00 BST
Scorecard

Nottinghamshire (H); 185 (40.5 overs)	v	Yorkshire; 191/3 (32.4 overs)
Brendan Taylor 60 (59); Tim Bresnan 3/22 (7 overs)		Joe Root 75* (80); Jake Ball 1/20 (5 overs)

Yorkshire won by 7 wickets
Trent Bridge, Nottingham
Umpires: Tim Robinson and Billy Taylor

- Yorkshire won the toss and elected to field.
- David Willey (Yorkshire) took his 100th List A wicket.
- Points: Yorkshire 2, Nottinghamshire 0.

30 April 2017
11:00 BST
Scorecard

Northamptonshire; 307/7 (50 overs)	v	Derbyshire (H); 309/4 (48.4 overs)
Richard Levi 109 (107); Shiv Thakor 3/39 (9 overs)		Shiv Thakor 130 (113); Rob Keogh 1/52 (9 overs)

Derbyshire won by 6 wickets
County Ground, Derby
Umpires: Peter Hartley and Russell Warren

- Derbyshire won the toss and elected to field.
- Miles Richardson (Northamptonshire) made his List A debut.
- Shiv Thakor (Derbyshire) scored his maiden List A century.
- Points: Derbyshire 2, Northamptonshire 0.

30 April 2017
11:00 BST
Scorecard

Worcestershire; 361/8 (50 overs)	v	Leicestershire (H); 319 (47.2 overs)
Moeen Ali 90 (87); James Sykes 2/54 (8 overs)		Aadil Ali 88 (80); Joe Leach 4/66 (8 overs)

Worcestershire won by 42 runs
Grace Road, Leicester
Umpires: Nigel Cowley and Neil Mallender

- Leicestershire won the toss and elected to field.
- Ben Cox (Worcestershire) played his 50th List A match.
- Points: Worcestershire 2, Leicestershire 0.

1 May 2017
11:00 BST
Scorecard

Durham; 313/5 (39 overs)	v	Warwickshire (H); 241 (38.2 overs)
Keaton Jennings 139 (101); Aaron Thomason 4/64 (7 overs)		Jonathan Trott 92 (81); James Weighell 5/57 (8 overs)

Durham won by 72 runs
Edgbaston, Birmingham
Umpires: Russell Evans and Ian Gould

- Warwickshire won the toss and elected to field.
- Rain delays reduced the match to 39 overs per side.
- James Weighell (Durham) took his maiden List A five-wicket haul.
- Points: Durham 2, Warwickshire 0.

1 May 2017
11:00 BST
Scorecard

Yorkshire (H); 296/9 (50 overs)	v	Lancashire; 217 (43.2 overs)
Peter Handscomb 86 (78); Ryan McLaren 3/43 (8 overs)		Alex Davies 43 (51); Azeem Rafiq 4/47 (9.2 overs)

Yorkshire won by 79 runs
Headingley, Leeds
Umpires: Graham Lloyd and Steve O'Shaugnessy

- Lancashire won the toss and elected to field.
- Points: Yorkshire 2, Lancashire 0.

2 May 2017
11:00 BST
Scorecard

Derbyshire (H); 303/4 (50 overs)	v	Nottinghamshire; 286/6 (46.2 overs)
Billy Godleman 90 (97); James Pattinson 2/55 (10 overs)		Alex Hales 77 (58); Wayne Madsen 2/26 (4.2 overs)

Nottinghamshire won by 4 wickets (D/L/S)
County Ground, Derby
Umpires: Tom Lungley and Neil Mallender

- Derbyshire won the toss and elected to bat.
- Rain delays reduced Nottinghamshire's innings to 47 overs. The target was revised to 286.
- Samit Patel (Nottinghamshire) took his 200th List A wicket.
- Riki Wessels (Nottinghamshire) passed 4,000 List A runs.
- Points: Nottinghamshire 2, Derbyshire 0.

2 May 2017
14:00 BST (D/N)
Scorecard

Leicestershire (H); 363/7 (50 overs)	v	Warwickshire; 260 (44 overs)
Mark Pettini 159 (135); Keith Barker 3/65 (10 overs)		Sam Hain 103 (107); Gavin Griffiths 3/35 (8 overs)

Leicestershire won by 103 runs
Grace Road, Leicester
Umpires: Russell Evans and Steve Garratt

- Leicestershire won the toss and elected to bat.
- Keith Barker (Warwickshire) played his 50th List A match.
- Points: Leicestershire 2, Warwickshire 0.

3 May 2017
11:00 BST
Scorecard

Durham; 335/5 (50 overs)	v	Yorkshire (H); 339/4 (47.4 overs)
Stephen Cook 106 (114); Matthew Waite 2/53 (10 overs)		Jonny Bairstow 174 (113); James Weighell 3/60 (10 overs)

Yorkshire won by 6 wickets
Headingley, Leeds
Umpires: Michael Gough and Graham Lloyd

- Durham won the toss and elected to bat.
- George Harding (Durham) made his List A debut.
- Adam Lyth (Yorkshire) played his 100th List A match.
- Paul Collingwood (Durham) passed 11,000 List A runs.
- Michael Richardson (Durham) scored his maiden List A century.
- This was Yorkshire's highest ever successful run chase in a List A match.
- Points: Yorkshire 2, Durham 0.

3 May 2017
14:00 BST (D/N)
Scorecard

Worcestershire; 277/9 (50 overs)	v	Northamptonshire (H); 277/7 (50 overs)
Ben Cox 82 (75); Azharullah 3/60 (10 overs)		Rob Newton 107 (123); Brett D'Oliveira 2/44 (10 overs)

Match tied
County Ground, Northampton
Umpires: Ian Gould and Tim Robinson

- Northamptonshire won the toss and elected to field.
- Rob Newton (Northamptonshire) scored his maiden List A century.
- Points: Northamptonshire 1, Worcestershire 1.

5 May 2017
11:00 BST
Scorecard

Leicestershire; 211 (49.5 overs)	v	Durham (H); 215/5 (43.2 overs)
Zak Chappell 59* (82); James Weighell 4/34 (10 overs)		Stephen Cook 67 (81); Dieter Klein 2/37 (10 overs)

Durham won by 5 wickets
Roseworth Terrace, Gosforth
Umpires: Peter Hartley and Neil Mallender

- Durham won the toss and elected to field.
- Points: Durham 2, Leicestershire 0.

5 May 2017
11:00 BST
Scorecard

Lancashire (H); 324/8 (50 overs)	v	Northamptonshire; 326/4 (46.4 overs)
Ryan McLaren 79 (94); Azharullah 3/55 (10 overs)		Alex Wakely 109* (98); James Anderson 2/51 (10 overs)

Northamptonshire won by 6 wickets
Aigburth Cricket Ground, Liverpool
Umpires: Russell Evans and David Millns

- Northamptonshire won the toss and elected to field.
- James Anderson (Lancashire) played his 250th List A match.
- Richard Levi (Northamptonshire) passed 4,000 List A runs.
- Points: Northamptonshire 2, Lancashire 0.

5 May 2017
11:00 BST
Scorecard

Nottinghamshire; 303/6 (50 overs)	v	Warwickshire (H); 293/9 (50 overs)
Billy Root 107* (93); Keith Barker 3/63 (10 overs)		Jonathan Trott 104 (108); Steven Mullaney 3/66 (10 overs)

Nottinghamshire won by 10 runs
Edgbaston, Birmingham
Umpires: Stephen Gale and Michael Gough

- Nottinghamshire won the toss and elected to bat.
- Matthew Lamb (Warwickshire) made his List A debut.
- Oliver Hannon-Dalby (Warwickshire) took his 50th List A wicket.
- Billy Root (Nottinghamshire) scored his maiden List A century.
- Points: Nottinghamshire 2, Warwickshire 0.

5 May 2017
11:00 BST
Scorecard

Worcestershire (H); 342 (48.5 overs)	v	Yorkshire; 291 (46.3 overs)
Tom Kohler-Cadmore 118 (119); Matthew Waite 4/65 (9.5 overs)		Peter Handscomb 88 (77); Daryl Mitchell 3/60 (10 overs)

Worcestershire won by 51 runs
New Road, Worcester
Umpires: Mike Burns and Jeremy Lloyds

- Yorkshire won the toss and elected to field.
- Josh Tongue (Worcestershire) made his List A debut.
- Tom Fell (Worcestershire) passed 1,000 List A runs.
- Points: Worcestershire 2, Yorkshire 0.

7 May 2017
11:00 BST
Scorecard

Durham (H); 291/7 (50 overs)	v	Northamptonshire; 272/8 (50 overs)
Keaton Jennings 101 (106); Ben Sanderson 3/36 (10 overs)		Adam Rossington 69 (51); Paul Coughlin 3/53 (10 overs)

Durham won by 19 runs
Riverside Ground, Chester-le-Street
Umpires: Peter Hartley and Paul Pollard

- Northamptonshire won the toss and elected to field.

7 May 2017
11:00 BST
Scorecard

Leicestershire; 217 (43.5 overs)	v	Nottinghamshire (H); 218/4 (38.2 overs)
Mark Cosgrove 80 (80); James Pattinson 4/42 (9 overs)		Samit Patel 79 (60); Zak Chappell 2/44 (7 overs)

Nottinghamshire won by 6 wickets
John Fretwell Sporting Complex, Market Warsop
Umpires: Nick Cook and Michael Gough

- Nottinghamshire won the toss and elected to field.
- Points: Nottinghamshire 2, Leicestershire 0.

7 May 2017
11:00 BST
Scorecard

Lancashire; 351/8 (50 overs)	v	Warwickshire (H); 325 (48.3 overs)
Steven Croft 127 (83); Jeetan Patel 3/48 (9 overs)		Rikki Clarke 76 (48); Simon Kerrigan 3/60 (9.3 overs)

Lancashire won by 26 runs
Edgabston, Birmingham
Umpires: Jeff Evans and Graham Lloyd

- Warwickshire won the toss and elected to field.
- Jeetan Patel (Warwickshire) took his 250th List A wicket.
- Points: Lancashire 2, Warwickshire 0.

7 May 2017
11:00 BST
Scorecard

Yorkshire (H); 349/7 (50 overs)	v	Derbyshire; 334/8 (50 overs)
Peter Handscomb 140 (112); Jeevan Mendis 2/59 (10 overs)		Wayne Madsen 112 (104); Ben Coad 4/63 (10 overs)

Yorkshire won by 15 runs
Headingley, Leeds
Umpires: Nigel Cowley and David Millns

- Derbyshire won the toss and elected to field.
- Adam Lyth (Yorkshire) passed 3,000 List A runs.
- Peter Handscomb (Yorkshire) scored his maiden List A century.
- Points: Yorkshire 2, Derbyshire 0.

10 May 2017
11:00 BST
Scorecard

Warwickshire; 292/7 (50 overs)	v	Derbyshire (H); 296/6 (49.4 overs)
Sam Hain 109 (106); Shiv Thakor 3/48 (10 overs)		Ben Slater 82 (95); Rikki Clarke 2/55 (10 overs)

Derbyshire won by 4 wickets
County Ground, Derby
Umpires: Steve Garratt and Steve O'Shaughnessy

- Derbyshire won the toss and elected to field.
- Mark Adair (Warwickshire) made his List A debut.
- Sam Hain (Warwickshire) passed 1,000 List A runs.
- Daryn Smit (Derbyshire) passed 2,000 List A runs.
- Points: Derbyshire 2, Warwickshire 0.

10 May 2017
11:00 BST
Scorecard

Lancashire (H); 313/5 (50 overs)	v	Worcestershire; 161 (34.5 overs)
Dane Vilas 100* (83); Josh Tongue 2/46 (7 overs)		Joe Clarke 36 (34); Jordan Clark 4/34 (8 overs)

Lancashire won by 152 runs
Old Trafford, Greater Manchester
Umpires: Paul Baldwin and Michael Gough

- Lancashire won the toss and elected to bat.
- James Anderson (Lancashire) took his 350th List A wicket.
- Points: Lancashire 2, Worcestershire 0.

10 May 2017
14:00 BST (D/N)
Scorecard

Yorkshire; 300/6 (50 overs)	v	Northamptonshire (H); 136 (28.1 overs)
Gary Ballance 152* (118); Graeme White 2/37 (10 overs)		Graeme White 40 (26); Azeem Rafiq 3/27 (4.1 overs)

Yorkshire won by 164 runs
County Ground, Northampton
Umpires: Neil Bainton and Russell Evans

- Northamptonshire won the toss and elected to field.
- Points: Yorkshire 2, Northamptonshire 0.

11 May 2017
14:00 BST (D/N)
Scorecard

Nottinghamshire (H); 297 (49.5 overs)	v	Durham; 299/6 (49.1 overs)
Alex Hales 104 (103); Mark Wood 3/62 (9.5 overs)		Graham Clark 92 (94); Jake Ball 2/53 (9 overs)

Durham won by 4 wickets
Trent Bridge, Nottingham
Umpires: Nick Cook and Tim Robinson

- Durham won the toss and elected to field.
- James Pattinson (Nottinghamshire) played his 50th List A match.
- Chris Rushworth (Durham) took his 100th List A wicket.
- Alex Hales (Nottinghamshire) passed 5,000 List A runs.
- Points: Durham 2, Nottinghamshire 0.

12 May 2017
11:00 BST
Scorecard

Derbyshire; 132/2 (21.3 overs)	v	Lancashire (H); 162/7 (17.5 overs)
Ben Slater 60* (60); Steven Croft 1/13 (1.5 overs)		Karl Brown 39 (30); Shiv Thakor 3/23 (3.5 overs)

Lancashire won by 3 wickets (D/L/S)
Stanley Park, Blackpool
Umpires: Steve Garratt and Steve O'Shaughnessy

- Lancashire won the toss and elected to field.
- Rain delays reduced Derbyshire's innings to 21.3 overs and Lancashire's innings to 18 overs. Lancashire's target was revised to 161.
- Billy Godleman (Derbyshire) played his 50th List A match.
- Ryan McLaren (Lancashire) passed 3,000 List A runs.
- Points: Lancashire 2, Derbyshire 0.

12 May 2017
11:00 BST
Scorecard

Warwickshire; 304/5 (49 overs)	v	Worcestershire (H); 241/7 (31.5 overs)
Ian Bell 104 (129); Brett D'Oliveira 2/34 (5 overs)		Joe Clarke 56 (51); Grant Thornton 4/42 (7 overs)

Worcestershire won by 3 wickets (D/L/S)
New Road, Worcester
Umpires: Michael Gough and Peter Hartley

- Worcestershire won the toss and elected to field.
- Rain delays reduced Warwickshire's innings to 49 overs and Worcestershire's innings to 34 overs. Worcestershire's target was revised to 241.
- Points: Worcestershire 2, Warwickshire 0.

12 May 2017
14:00 BST (D/N)
Scorecard

Northamptonshire; 121/1 (16.5 overs)	v	Leicestershire (H)
Richard Levi 59* (47); Dieter Klein 1/32 (3.5 overs)

No result
Grace Road, Leicester
Umpires: Paul Baldwin and Alex Wharf

- Leicestershire won the toss and elected to field.
- Rain during Northamptonshire's innings stopped play from which play never restarted.
- Max Holden (Northamptonshire) made his List A debut.
- Cameron Delport (Leicestershire) played his 100th List A match.
- Points: Leicestershire 1, Northamptonshire 1.

14 May 2017
11:00 BST
Scorecard

Derbyshire; 219 (47.4 overs)	v	Leicestershire (H); 222/5 (39.5 overs)
Alex Hughes 96* (106); Gavin Griffiths 3/44 (10 overs)		Ned Eckersley 80 (81); Ben Cotton 2/18 (9 overs)

Leicestershire won by 5 wickets
Grace Road, Leicester
Umpires: Nick Cook and Tim Robinson

- Leicestershire won the toss and elected to field.
- Jeevan Mendis (Derbyshire) passed 3,000 List A runs.
- Points: Leicestershire 2, Derbyshire 0.

14 May 2017
11:00 BST
Scorecard

Lancashire; 260/6 (50 overs)	v	Nottinghamshire (H); 265/3 (46 overs)
Haseeb Hameed 75* (79); Steven Mullaney 2/31 (8 overs)		Samit Patel 103* (104); Danny Lamb 2/57 (10 overs)

Nottinghamshire won by 7 wickets
Trent Bridge, Nottingham
Umpires: Paul Baldwin and Alex Wharf

- Lancashire won the toss and elected to bat.
- Danny Lamb (Lancashire) made his List A debut.
- Harry Gurney (Nottinghamshire) took his 100th List A wicket.
- Points: Nottinghamshire 2, Lancashire 0.

14 May 2017
11:00 BST
Scorecard

Yorkshire; 281/8 (50 overs)	v	Warwickshire (H); 284/5 (47.3 overs)
Joe Root 83 (98); Grant Thornton 3/63 (9 overs)		Ian Bell 98 (85); Azeem Rafiq 3/35 (10 overs)

Warwickshire won by 5 wickets
Edgbaston, Birmingham
Umpires: David Millns and Steve O'Shaughnessy

- Yorkshire won the toss and elected to bat.
- Points: Warwickshire 2, Yorkshire 0.

14 May 2017
11:00 BST
Scorecard

Worcestershire (H); 270/8 (50 overs)	v	Durham; 255/9 (50 overs)
Brett D'Oliveira 73* (68); Paul Coughlin 3/36 (9 overs)		Graham Clark 114 (128); Daryl Mitchell 3/38 (7 overs)

Worcestershire won by 15 runs
New Road, Worcester
Umpires: Jeff Evans and Jeremy Lloyds

- Durham won the toss and elected to field.
- Graham Clark (Durham) scored his maiden List A century.
- Points: Worcestershire 2, Durham 0.

16 May 2017
14:00 BST (D/N)
Scorecard

Derbyshire (H); 209/8 (36 overs)	v	Worcestershire; 218/5 (32 overs)
Shiv Thakor 60 (63); Ed Barnard 3/37 (7 overs)		Daryl Mitchell 67 (71); Hardus Viljoen 3/55 (8 overs)

Worcestershire won by 5 wickets (D/L/S)
County Ground, Derby
Umpires: David Millns and Alex Wharf
Player of the match: Tom Kohler-Cadmore (Worcestershire)

- Worcestershire won the toss and elected to field.
- Rain delays reduced Worcestershire's innings to 36 overs. The target was revised to 218.
- Points: Worcestershire 2, Derbyshire 0.

16 May 2017
14:00 BST (D/N)
Scorecard

Lancashire; 304/8 (50 overs)	v	Durham (H); 276/9 (50 overs)
Dane Vilas 108 (88); Paul Collingwood 3/43 (10 overs)		Michael Richardson 58 (74); Kyle Jarvis 3/42 (10 overs)

Lancashire won by 28 runs
Riverside Ground, Chester-le-Street
Umpires: Michael Gough and Tim Robinson

- Durham won the toss and elected to field.
- Points: Lancashire 2, Durham 0.

16 May 2017
14:00 BST (D/N)
Scorecard

Northamptonshire (H); 79/0 (14.4 overs)	v	Nottinghamshire
Ben Duckett 56* (51)

No result
County Ground, Northampton
Umpires: Nick Cook and Steve Garratt

- Nottinghamshire won the toss and elected to field.
- Rain during Northamptonshire's innings stopped play from which play never restarted.
- Points: Northamptonshire 1, Nottinghamshire 1.

16 May 2017
14:00 BST (D/N)
Scorecard

Yorkshire (H); 258/7 (45 overs)	v	Leicestershire; 238 (42.4 overs)
Azeem Rafiq 52* (30); Gavin Griffiths 3/46 (9 overs)		Cameron Delport 68 (47); Karl Carver 3/24 (9 overs)

Yorkshire won by 20 runs
Headingley, Leeds
Umpires: Paul Baldwin and Jeremy Lloyds

- Leicestershire won the toss and elected to field.
- Rain reduced the match to 45 overs per side.
- Callum Parkinson (Leicestershire) made his List A debut.

=== South Group ===
The South group was won by Essex who won seven of their matches. Somerset and Surrey finished second and third in the group respectively and qualified for the quarter-final stage of the tournament.

==== Table ====
Pos	Team	Pld	W	L	T	NR	Ded	Pts	NRR
1	Essex (Note: advanced directly to the semi-finals)	8	7	1	0	0	0	14	0.882
2	Somerset (Note: advanced to the quarter-finals)	8	5	2	0	1	0	11	0.543
3	Surrey	8	4	3	0	1	0	9	0.101
4	Glamorgan	8	4	4	0	0	0	8	−0.660
5	Sussex	8	3	3	0	2	0	8	0.535
6	Hampshire	8	3	4	0	1	0	7	−0.109
7	Gloucestershire	8	3	4	0	1	0	7	−0.435
8	Middlesex	8	2	4	0	2	0	6	−0.243
9	Kent	8	1	7	0	0	0	2	−0.409

Source: BBC Sport

==== Fixtures ====
27 April 2017
11:00 BST
Scorecard

Glamorgan; 277/7 (50 overs)	v	Gloucestershire (H); 232/8 (44 overs)
Jacques Rudolph 121 (143); Chris Liddle 2/51 (10 overs)		Michael Klinger 78 (84); Colin Ingram 3/39 (7 overs)

Glamorgan won by 18 runs (D/L/S)
County Ground, Bristol
Umpires: Mike Burns and Russell Evans

- Gloucestershire won the toss and elected to field.
- Rain delays reduced Gloucestershire's innings to 44 overs. The target was revised to 251.
- Lukas Carey (Glamorgan) made his List A debut.
- Points: Glamorgan 2, Gloucestershire 0.

27 April 2017
11:00 BST
Scorecard

Kent (H); 258 (49.4 overs)	v	Hampshire; 260/4 (45.1 overs)
Darren Stevens 60 (57); Reece Topley 3/65 (9.4 overs)		Tom Alsop 112* (132); Mitchell Claydon 2/51 (8 overs)

Hampshire won by 6 wickets
St Lawrence Ground, Canterbury
Umpires: Paul Pollard and Martin Saggers

- Hampshire won the toss and elected to field.
- Ian Holland (Hampshire) made his List A debut.
- Points: Hampshire 2, Kent 0.

27 April 2017
11:00 BST
Scorecard

Middlesex (H); 341/5 (50 overs)	v	Sussex; 26/1 (4 overs)
John Simpson 82* (80); Ajmal Shahzad 2/88 (9 overs)		Chris Nash 25* (14); Tom Helm 1/2 (2 overs)

No result
Lord's, London
Umpires: Nigel Cowley and Steve Garratt

- Sussex won the toss and elected to field.
- Play was abandoned after rain stopped play during Sussex's innings.
- Points: Middlesex 1, Sussex 1.

28 April 2017
11:00 BST
Scorecard

Surrey; 290/8 (50 overs)	v	Somerset (H); 291/6 (43.5 overs)
Ben Foakes 92 (65); Craig Overton 3/57 (10 overs)		Roelof van der Merwe 165* (122); Jade Dernbach 3/46 (8.5 overs)

Somerset won by 4 wickets
County Ground, Taunton
Umpires: Jeff Evans and Alex Wharf
Player of the match: Roelof van der Merwe (Somerset)

- Somerset won the toss and elected to field.
- Roelof van der Merwe (Somerset) scored his maiden List A century.
- Points: Somerset 2, Surrey 0.

30 April 2017
11:00 BST
Scorecard

Essex (H); 304/7 (50 overs)	v	Hampshire; 279 (48.2 overs)
Tom Westley 93 (98); Liam Dawson 2/40 (10 overs)		James Vince 68 (74); Neil Wagner 4/41 (9.2 overs)

Essex won by 25 runs
County Ground, Chelmsford
Umpires: Rob Bailey and Ben Debenham

- Hampshire won the toss and elected to field.
- George Bailey (Hampshire) played his 250th List A match.
- Points: Essex 2, Hampshire 0.

30 April 2017
11:00 BST
Scorecard

Glamorgan (H); 239 (48.3 overs)	v	Surrey; 183/2 (24 overs)
Colin Ingram 72 (96 overs); Jade Dernbach 3/30 (9 overs)		Kumar Sangakkara 81* (69); Lukas Carey 1/33 (4 overs)

Surrey won by 8 wickets (D/L/S)
Sophia Gardens, Cardiff
Umpires: Ian Blackwell and Jeremy Lloyds

- Surrey won the toss and elected to field.
- Rain delays reduced Surrey innings to 29 overs. The target was revised to 182.
- Kumar Sangakkara (Surrey) passed 19,000 List A runs.
- Points: Surrey 2, Glamorgan 0.

30 April 2017
11:00 BST
Scorecard

Middlesex (H); 256/9 (50 overs)	v	Gloucestershire; 257/5 (49.1 overs)
Adam Voges 81 (107); Liam Norwell 5/36 (10 overs)		Ian Cockbain 108* (123); Toby Roland-Jones 2/46 (10 overs)

Gloucestershire won by 5 wickets
Lord's, London
Umpires: Nick Cook and Tom Lungley

- Middlesex won the toss and elected to bat.
- Phil Mustard (Gloucestershire) played his 200th List A match.
- Benny Howell (Gloucestershire) took his 50th List A wicket.
- Adam Voges (Middlesex) passed 6,000 List A runs.
- Ian Cockbain (Gloucestershire) scored his maiden List A century.
- Points: Gloucestershire 2, Middlesex 0.

30 April 2017
11:00 BST
Scorecard

Somerset; 303/5 (49 overs)	v	Sussex (H); 155/9 (20 overs)
Dean Elgar 131* (127); David Wiese 2/51 (10 overs)		Laurie Evans 40 (20); Craig Overton 3/21 (4 overs)

Somerset won by 9 runs (D/L/S)
County Ground, Hove
Umpires: Neil Bainton and Martin Saggers

- Sussex won the toss and elected to field.
- An initial rain delay reduced the match to 49 overs per side. Further rain delays reduced Sussex's innings to 20 overs. The target was revised to 165.
- Points: Somerset 2, Sussex 0.

2 May 2017
11:00 BST
Scorecard

Kent; 352/6 (50 overs)	v	Somerset (H); 354/6 (47.3 overs)
Alex Blake 116 (58); Craig Overton 3/66 (10 overs)		Peter Trego 135 (119); James Tredwell 3/65 (10 overs)

Somerset won by 4 wickets
County Ground, Taunton
Umpires: Ian Blackwell and Jeremy Lloyds

- Kent won the toss and elected to bat.
- Lewis Gregory (Somerset) played his 50th List A match.
- Alex Blake (Kent) scored his maiden List A century.
- Peter Trego (Somerset) passed 4,000 List A runs.
- Points: Somerset 2, Kent 0.

2 May 2017
11:00 BST
Scorecard

Surrey (H); 210 (47.4 overs)	v	Essex; 212/9 (49.2 overs)
Ben Foakes 77* (92); Matthew Quinn 3/34 (9.4 overs)		Ryan ten Doeschate 45 (59); Jade Dernbach 4/31 (10 overs)

Essex won by 1 wicket
The Oval, London
Umpires: Nigel Llong and Martin Saggers

- Surrey won the toss and elected to bat.
- Gareth Batty (Surrey) played his 250th List A match.
- Ravi Bopara (Essex) played his 300th List A match.
- Points: Essex 2, Surrey 0.

2 May 2017
11:00 BST
Scorecard

Sussex (H); 292/6 (50 overs)	v	Glamorgan; 221 (40 overs)
Stiaan van Zyl 96 (88); Marchant de Lange 3/51 (10 overs)		Chris Cooke 62 (47); Danny Briggs 3/53 (8 overs)

Sussex won by 59 runs (D/L/S)
County Ground, Hove
Umpires: Nick Cook and David Millns

- Sussex won the toss and elected to bat.
- Rain delays reduced Glamorgan's innings to 43 overs. The target was revised to 281.
- Chris Nash (Sussex) passed 3,000 List A runs.
- Points: Sussex 2, Glamorgan 0.

3 May 2017
14:00 BST (D/N)
Scorecard

Middlesex; 295 (50 overs)	v	Hampshire (H); 146/7 (30.3 overs)
Nick Gubbins 114 (117); Reece Topley 4/68 (10 overs)		George Bailey 52* (67); Toby Roland-Jones 4/10 (7 overs)

Middlesex won by 89 runs (D/L/S)
Rose Bowl, Southampton
Umpires: Jeff Evans and Alex Wharf
Player of the match: Toby Roland-Jones (Middlesex)

- Hampshire won the toss and elected to field.
- Rain stopped play during Hampshire's innings, from which play never restarted. The target was revised to 236.
- James Fuller (Middlesex) played his 50th List A match.
- Points: Middlesex 2, Hampshire 0.

4 May 2017
11:00 BST
Scorecard

Essex (H); 315/8 (50 overs)	v	Gloucestershire; 286/8 (50 overs)
Alastair Cook 127 (134); Chris Liddle 4/54 (10 overs)		Phil Mustard 90 (102); Ravi Bopara 3/34 (10 overs)

Essex won by 29 runs
County Ground, Chelmsford
Umpires: Neil Bainton and Nick Cook

- Gloucestershire won the toss and elected to field.
- Points: Essex 2, Gloucestershire 0.

5 May 2017
11:00 BST
Scorecard

Somerset; 338/3 (50 overs)	v	Glamorgan (H); 168 (36.4 overs)
Jim Allenby 144* (146); Michael Hogan 1/45 (10 overs)		Kiran Carlson 63 (59); Roelof van der Merwe 3/21 (5.4 overs)

Somerset won by 170 runs
Sophia Gardens, Cardiff
Umpires: Steve O'Shaughnessy and Russell Warren

- Glamorgan won the toss and elected to field.
- Jim Allenby (Somerset) scored his maiden List A century.
- Craig Overton (Somerset) took his 50th List A wicket.
- Roelof van der Merwe (Somerset) took his 200th List A wicket.
- Points: Somerset 2, Glamorgan 0.

5 May 2017
11:00 BST
Scorecard

Kent (H); 331/7 (50 overs)	v	Sussex; 332/4 (47.5 overs)
Daniel Bell-Drummond 138 (138); Jofra Archer 3/54 (10 overs)		Laurie Evans 134* (86); James Tredwell 1/39 (10 overs)

Sussex won by 6 wickets
St Lawrence Ground, Canterbury
Umpires: Ben Debenham and Nigel Llong

- Sussex won the toss and elected to field.
- Daniel Bell-Drummond (Kent) passed 2,000 List A runs.
- Laurie Evans (Sussex) scored his maiden List A century.
- Points: Sussex 2, Kent 0.

5 May 2017
11:00 BST
Scorecard

Middlesex; 243/9 (50 overs)	v	Surrey (H); 244/3 (45.2 overs)
John Simpson 75 (83); Ravi Rampaul 4/40 (10 overs)		Rory Burns 67* (70); Dawid Malan 2/39 (6 overs)

Surrey won by 7 wickets
The Oval, London
Umpires: Steve Garratt and Ian Gould

- Surrey won the toss and elected to field.
- John Simpson (Middlesex) passed 1,000 List A runs.
- Points: Surrey 2, Middlesex 0.

7 May 2017
11:00 BST
Scorecard

Glamorgan (H); 281/7 (50 overs)	v	Essex; 280/9 (50 overs)
Colin Ingram 142 (130); Neil Wagner 4/58 (10 overs)		Varun Chopra 124 (138); Michael Hogan 2/42 (10 overs)

Glamorgan won by 1 run
Sophia Gardens, Cardiff
Umpires: Mike Burns and Jeremy Lloyds

- Glamorgan won the toss and elected to bat.
- Points: Glamorgan 2, Essex 0.

7 May 2017
11:00 BST
Scorecard

Gloucestershire; 237 (49.2 overs)	v	Hampshire (H); 239/3 (42.3 overs)
Jack Taylor 63 (62); Liam Dawson 3/30 (10 overs)		James Vince 89* (81); Chris Liddle 1/18 (3 overs)

Hampshire won by 7 wickets
Rose Bowl, Southampton
Umpires: Steve Garratt and Alex Wharf

- Gloucestershire won the toss and elected to bat.
- Points: Hampshire 2, Gloucestershire 0.

7 May 2017
11:00 BST
Scorecard

Kent (H); 200 (46 overs)	v	Middlesex; 154 (46 overs)
Sam Northeast 55 (78); Toby Roland-Jones 3/35 (10 overs)		Nick Compton 37 (85); Joe Denly 3/20 (6 overs)

Kent won by 46 runs
St Lawrence Ground, Canterbury
Umpires: Ian Gould and Martin Saggers

- Middlesex won the toss and elected to field.
- Points: Kent 2, Middlesex 0.

7 May 2017
11:00 BST
Scorecard

Sussex (H); 300/8 (50 overs)	v	Surrey; 205 (41.1 overs)
Chris Nash 82 (87); Ravi Rampaul 3/59 (10 overs)		Mark Stoneman 60 (62); David Wiese 4/29 (9.1 overs)

Sussex won by 95 runs
County Ground, Hove
Umpires: Neil Bainton and Nigel Llong

- Surrey won the toss and elected to field.
- Points: Sussex 2, Surrey 0.

10 May 2017
11:00 BST
Scorecard

Gloucestershire (H); 275/8 (50 overs)	v	Kent; 264/9 (50 overs)
Michael Klinger 134 (145); Matt Coles 4/57 (10 overs)		Daniel Bell-Drummond 90 (108); Chris Liddle 5/36 (10 overs)

Gloucestershire won by 11 runs
County Ground, Bristol
Umpires: Peter Hartley and Jeremy Lloyds

- Kent won the toss and elected to field.
- George Hankins (Gloucestershire) made his List A debut.
- Michael Klinger (Gloucestershire) passed 7,000 List A runs.
- Points: Gloucestershire 2, Kent 0.

10 May 2017
11:00 BST
Scorecard

Middlesex (H); 243 (48.4 overs)	v	Glamorgan; 227 (48.3 overs)
James Franklin 54 (75); Colin Ingram 4/39 (10 overs)		Colin Ingram 53 (57); Steven Finn 4/39 (10 overs)

Middlesex won by 16 runs
Brunton Memorial Ground, Radlett
Umpires: Stephen Gale and Martin Saggers

- Middlesex won the toss and elected to bat.
- Craig Meschede (Glamorgan) played his 50th List A match.
- Chris Cooke (Glamorgan) passed 2,000 List A runs.
- Points: Middlesex 2, Glamorgan 0.

10 May 2017
11:00 BST
Scorecard

Somerset (H); 249 (44.2 overs)	v	Hampshire; 250/6 (37.2 overs)
Dean Elgar 78 (88); Gareth Berg 3/44 (8 overs)		Rilee Rossouw 156 (113); Jamie Overton 4/64 (9 overs)

Hampshire won by 4 wickets
County Ground, Taunton
Umpires: Nigel Cowley and Jeff Evans

- Hampshire won the toss and elected to field.
- Points: Hampshire 2, Somerset 0.

10 May 2017
14:00 BST (D/N)
Scorecard

Essex (H); 295/7 (50 overs)	v	Sussex; 285 (48.1 overs)
Alastair Cook 109 (131); Jerome Taylor 3/65 (10 overs)		Stiaan van Zyl 61 (66); Paul Walter 3/45 (9.1 overs)

Essex won by 10 runs
County Ground, Chelmsford
Umpires: Rob Bailey and Graham Lloyd
Player of the match: Alastair Cook (Essex)

- Sussex won the toss and elected to field.
- Paul Walter (Essex) made his List A debut.
- Jerome Taylor (Sussex) took a hat-trick.
- Points: Essex 2, Sussex 0.

12 May 2017
11:00 BST
Scorecard

Somerset; 294/6 (46 overs)	v	Gloucestershire (H); 215 (41.5 overs)
Adam Hose 101* (93); Matt Taylor 3/48 (9 overs)		Jack Taylor 68 (50); Max Waller 3/37 (7.5 overs)

Somerset won by 81 runs (D/L/S)
County Ground, Bristol
Umpires: Neil Bainton and Nigel Cowley

- Somerset won the toss and elected to bat.
- Rain delays reduced the match to 46 overs per side. Gloucestershire's target was revised to 297.
- Roelof van der Merwe (Somerset) played his 150th List A match.
- Adam Hose (Somerset) scored his maiden List A century.
- Points: Somerset 2, Gloucestershire 0.

12 May 2017
11:00 BST
Scorecard

Hampshire (H); 332/6 (49 overs)	v	Glamorgan; 334/7 (48.5 overs)
James Vince 178 (138); Marchant de Lange 5/49 (9 overs)		Colin Ingram 115 (78); Mason Crane 3/69 (10 overs)

Glamorgan won by 3 wickets
Rose Bowl, Southampton
Umpires: Stephen Gale and Martin Saggers

- Glamorgan won the toss and elected to field.
- Rain delays reduced the match to 49 overs per side.
- Liam Dawson (Hampshire) passed 3,000 List A runs.
- James Vince's 178 was the highest List A score by a Hampshire batsman.
- Colin Ingram (Glamorgan) passed 7,000 List A runs.
- Points: Glamorgan 2, Hampshire 0.

12 May 2017
11:00 BST
Scorecard

Surrey (H); 251/7 (41 overs)	v	Kent; 204 (35.4 overs)
Ben Foakes 82* (80); Darren Stevens 2/37 (8 overs)		Sam Billings 69 (65); Stuart Meaker 4/37 (6.4 overs)

Surrey won by 44 runs (D/L/S)
The Oval, London
Umpires: Rob Bailey and Billy Taylor

- Kent won the toss and elected to field.
- Rain delays reduced the match to 41 overs per side. Kent's target was revised to 249.
- Ben Foakes (Surrey) passed 1,000 List A runs.
- Joe Denly (Kent) passed 4,000 List A runs.
- Points: Surrey 2, Kent 0.

12 May 2017
14:00 BST (D/N)
Scorecard

Middlesex; 148 (40.2 overs)	v	Essex (H); 149/3 (29.4 overs)
Dawid Malan 23 (34); Paul Walter 4/37 (8 overs)		Alastair Cook 67* (83); Ravi Patel 2/39 (10 overs)

Essex won by 7 wickets
County Ground, Chelmsford
Umpires: Russell Evans and Graham Lloyd

- Essex won the toss and elected to field.
- Ryan ten Doeschate (Essex) played his 200th List A match.
- Points: Essex 2, Middlesex 0.

14 May 2017
11:00 BST
Scorecard

Glamorgan (H); 356/7 (50 overs)	v	Kent; 341 (47.2 overs)
Colin Ingram 114 (98); Matt Coles 2/32 (9 overs)		Darren Stevens 147 (67); David Lloyd 5/53 (10 overs)

Glamorgan won by 15 runs
St. Helen's, Swansea
Umpires: Nigel Cowley and Michael Gough

- Kent won the toss and elected to field.
- Darren Stevens (Kent) played his 300th List A match.
- Darren Stevens' score of 147 set a new Kent record for the highest individual score in a List A match.
- 35 sixes were hit in this game, equalling the record for List A matches.
- Points: Glamorgan 2, Kent 0.

14 May 2017
11:00 BST
Scorecard

Essex; 334/6 (50 overs)	v	Somerset (H); 262 (43.2 overs)
Tom Westley 100 (98); Roelof van der Merwe 2/67 (10 overs)		Jim Allenby 77 (89); Neil Wagner 3/55 (8 overs)

Essex won by 72 runs
County Ground, Taunton
Umpires: Mike Burns and Stephen Gale

- Somerset won the toss and elected to field.
- Tom Westley (Essex) passed 2,000 List A runs.
- Points: Essex 2, Somerset 0.

14 May 2017
11:00 BST
Scorecard

Hampshire; 271/8 (50 overs)	v	Surrey (H); 238/2 (38 overs)
George Bailey 145* (132); Ravi Rampaul 4/61 (10 overs)		Kumar Sangakkara 124* (121); Kyle Abbott 1/34 (7 overs)

Surrey won by 66 runs (D/L/S)
The Oval, London
Umpires: Neil Bainton and Graham Lloyd

- Hampshire won the toss and elected to bat.
- Ravi Rampaul (Surrey) took his 250th List A wicket.
- Points: Surrey 2, Hampshire 0.

14 May 2017
11:00 BST
Scorecard

Sussex (H); 240 (49.5 overs)	v	Gloucestershire; 241/4 (48.4 overs)
Luke Wright 84 (108); Chris Liddle 5/52 (10 overs)		George Hankins 67 (102); Jofra Archer 2/38 (9.4 overs)

Gloucestershire won by 6 wickets
The Saffrons, Eastbourne
Umpires: Martin Saggers and Billy Taylor

- Gloucestershire won the toss and elected to field.
- Laurie Evans (Sussex) passed 1,000 List A runs.
- Points: Gloucestershire 2, Sussex 0.

17 May 2017
14:00 BST (D/N)
Scorecard

Gloucestershire (H)	v	Surrey

Match abandoned

- No toss.
- No play was possible due to rain.

17 May 2017
14:00 BST (D/N)
Scorecard

Hampshire (H)	v	Sussex

Match abandoned

- No toss.
- No play was possible due to rain.

17 May 2017
14:00 BST (D/N)
Scorecard

Essex; 307/6 (50 overs)	v	Kent (H); 50/3 (11 overs)
Varun Chopra 83 (98); Calum Haggett 2/59 (10 overs)		Daniel Bell-Drummond 25 (28); Ashar Zaidi 2/10 (2 overs)

Essex won by 57 runs (D/L method)
St Lawrence Ground, Canterbury
Umpires: Nigel Cowley and Stephen Gale

- Kent won the toss and elected to field.
- Rain meant Kent were set a revised target of 108 from 11 overs.
- Zak Crawley (Kent) made his List A debut.

17 May 2017
14:00 BST (D/N)
Scorecard

Middlesex (H)	v	Somerset

Match abandoned

- No toss.
- No play was possible due to rain.

== Knockout stage ==
The winner of each group progressed straight to the semi-finals with the second and third placed teams playing a play-off match against a team from the other group which made up the quarter-finals. The winner of each quarter-final played one of the group winners in the semi-finals. The final was held at Lord's on 1 July 2017.

Quarter-finals
N2	Yorkshire Vikings	289/9
S3	Surrey	313/7
S2	Somerset	405
N3	Nottinghamshire Outlaws	429/9

Semi-finals
N1	Worcestershire Rapids	210
S3	Surrey	363/7
S1	Essex Eagles	370/5
N3	Nottinghamshire Outlaws	373/5

Final
S3	Surrey	297/9
N3	Nottinghamshire Outlaws	298/6

=== Quarter-finals ===
13 June 2017
11:00 BST
Scorecard

Nottinghamshire; 429/9 (50 overs)	v	Somerset (H); 405 (48 overs)
Brendan Taylor 154 (97); Lewis Gregory 4/60 (8 overs)		Dean Elgar 91 (63); Harry Gurney 3/71 (9 overs)

Nottinghamshire won by 24 runs
County Ground, Taunton
Umpires: Michael Gough and David Millns

- Somerset won the toss and elected to field.

13 June 2017
14:00 BST (D/N)
Scorecard

Surrey; 313/7 (50 overs)	v	Yorkshire (H); 289/9 (50 overs)
Kumar Sangakkara 121 (121); Azeem Rafiq 3/51 (10 overs)		Adam Lyth 75 (83); Ravi Rampaul 3/54 (8 overs)

Surrey won by 24 runs
Headingley, Leeds
Umpires: Peter Hartley and Neil Mallender
Player of the match: Kumar Sangakkara (Surrey)

- Surrey won the toss and elected to bat.
- Kumar Sangakkara scored in 100th century in all formats combined.

=== Semi-finals ===
16 June 2017
13:30 BST (D/N)
Scorecard

Essex (H); 370/5 (50 overs)	v	Nottinghamshire; 373/5 (49.3 overs)
Alastair Cook 133 (128); Samit Patel 2/51 (9 overs)		Samit Patel 122* (123); Jamie Porter 3/56 (8 overs)

Nottinghamshire won by 5 wickets
County Ground, Chelmsford
Umpires: Nick Cook and Jeremy Lloyds
Player of the match: Steven Mullaney (Nottinghamshire)

- Essex won the toss and elected to bat.
- Nottinghamshire made the highest successful run-chase in a 50-over match in English domestic cricket.

17 June 2017
11:00 BST
Scorecard

Surrey; 363/7 (50 overs)	v	Worcestershire (H); 210 (33.2 overs)
Jason Roy 92 (81); Joe Leach 2/66 (8 overs)		Ross Whiteley 55 (42); Gareth Batty 5/40 (9 overs)

Surrey won by 153 runs
New Road, Worcester
Umpires: Rob Bailey and Alex Wharf

- Surrey won the toss and elected to bat.

=== Final ===
1 July 2017
11:00 BST
Scorecard

Surrey; 297/9 (50 overs)	v	Nottinghamshire; 298/6 (47.5 overs)
Mark Stoneman 144 (149); Samit Patel 3/51 (10 overs)		Alex Hales 187* (167); Sam Curran 3/68 (9.5 overs)

Nottinghamshire won by 4 wickets
Lord's, London
Umpires: Tim Robinson and Alex Wharf
Player of the match: Alex Hales (Nottinghamshire)

- Surrey won the toss and elected to bat.
