= List of Rangpur Riders cricketers =

This is presenting a complete list in alphabetical order of cricketers who have played for Rangpur Riders in Twenty20 matches held by the Bangladesh Premier League. The Rangpur Riders franchise was formed ahead of the 2013 BPL edition, taking part in that and the 2015 edition. Complying with other club lists, details are the player's name followed by his years active as a Rangpur Riders player, current players to the end of the 2015–16 Bangladeshi cricket season.

== A ==
- Abdullah al Mamun (2015–16)
- Abdur Razzak (2012–13)
- Abu Jayed (2015–16)
- Al-Amin (2015–16)
- Amit Kumar (2012–13)
- Arafat Sunny junior (2015–16)
- Arafat Sunny senior (2015–16)
- AB de Villiers (South Africa) (2019)
- Alex Hales (England) (2019)

== B ==
- Cameron Borgas (Australia; 2012–13)
- Babar Azam (Pakistan 2024–2024)

== C ==
- Chris Gayle (West Indies) (2017–2019)

== D ==
- Dhiman Ghosh (2012–13)

== E ==
- Fidel Edwards (West Indies; 2012–13)

== H ==
- Danza Hyatt (West Indies; 2012–13)

== I ==
- Imrul Kayes (2012–13)

== J ==
- Jahurul Islam (2015–16)
- Junaid Siddique (2012–13)

== M ==
- Dimitri Mascarenhas (England; 2012–13)
- Mehdi Hasan (2012–13)
- Misbah-ul-Haq (Pakistan; 2015–16)
- Mithun Ali (2015–16)
- Mohammad Nabi (Afghanistan; 2015–16)
- Mohammad Sharif (2012–13)
- Muktar Ali (2015–16)
- Murad Khan (2012–13)

== N ==
- Nasir Hossain (2012–13)

== O ==
- Kevin O'Brien (Ireland; 2012–13)
- Niall O'Brien (Ireland; 2012–13)

== P ==
- Tissara Perera (Sri Lanka; 2015–16)

== S ==
- Saikat Ali (2012–13)
- Sajib Datta (2012–13)
- Darren Sammy (West Indies; 2015–16)
- Saqlain Sajib (2015–16)
- Sachithra Senanayake (Sri Lanka; 2015–16)
- Shakib Al Hasan (2015–16)
- Shamsur Rahman (2012–13)
- Lendl Simmons (West Indies; 2015–16)
- Soumya Sarkar (2015–16)

== T ==
- Tapash Baisya (2012–13)
- Taposh Ghosh (2012–13)

== W ==
- Wahab Riaz (Pakistan; 2015–16)
