= 2017 T20 Blast =

2017 NatWest T20 Blast
- Dates: 7 July 2017 – 2 September 2017
- Administrator: England and Wales Cricket Board
- Cricket format: Twenty20
- Tournament format(s): Group stage and knockout
- Champions: Nottinghamshire Outlaws (1st title)
- Participants: 18
- Matches: 133
- Attendance: 883,000 (6,639 per match)
- Most runs: Joe Denly (567)
- Most wickets: Clint McKay (23)
- Official website: NatWest T20 Blast

The 2017 NatWest T20 Blast was the fifteenth edition of the T20 Blast, a professional domestic T20 competition league in England and Wales run by the ECB. The league consisted of the 18 first-class county teams divided into two divisions of nine teams each with fixtures played between July and September. Ahead of the final round of fixtures, 15 teams were still in a position to qualify for the quarter-finals. The finals day took place at Edgbaston Cricket Ground in Birmingham on 2 September 2017. Nottinghamshire Outlaws were the competition winners.

== Competition format ==
The 18 competing teams were initially split into 2 divisions (North and South), each containing 9 teams, for the group stage of the competition. During the group stage (from July to September) each club played six of the other teams in the same division twice, once at a home stadium and once at a home ground of their opponents. They played the other two teams only once, for a total of 14 games each. Teams received two points for a win and one point for a tie or if a match was abandoned. Teams were ranked within their groups by total points, then net run rate. At the end of the group stage, the top four teams from each group entered the knockout stage of the competition.

== Results and standings ==
=== Table ===
Pos	Team	Pld	W	L	T	NR	Ded	Pts	NRR
1	Nottinghamshire Outlaws	14	8	4	0	2	0	18	0.484
2	Derbyshire Falcons	14	8	5	0	1	0	17	0.457
3	Birmingham Bears	14	8	5	0	1	0	17	0.230
4	Leicestershire Foxes	14	8	5	0	1	0	17	0.133
5	Yorkshire Vikings	14	6	5	1	2	0	15	1.127
6	Northamptonshire Steelbacks	14	6	5	0	3	0	15	−0.630
7	Lancashire Lightning	14	5	6	1	2	0	13	0.174
8	Worcestershire Rapids	14	3	10	0	1	0	7	−0.713
9	Durham Jets	14	3	10	0	1	4	3 (Note: Durham were given a four-point deduction after accepting a financial aid package.)	−1.206

Source: BBC Sport

=== July ===
7 July	Worcestershire Rapids (H); 152/9 (20 overs)	v	Birmingham Bears; 153/2 (19 overs)	Birmingham Bears won by 8 wickets
Scorecard	Worcestershire Rapids (H); 152/9 (20 overs)	v	Birmingham Bears; 153/2 (19 overs)	New Road, Worcester; Umpires: Neil Bainton and Nigel Cowley; Player of the match: Ian Bell (Birmingham Bears)
Scorecard	Ben Cox 43 (27); Rikki Clarke 3/20 (4 overs)		Ian Bell 75* (55); Daryl Mitchell 1/10 (3 overs)	New Road, Worcester; Umpires: Neil Bainton and Nigel Cowley; Player of the match: Ian Bell (Birmingham Bears)
Birmingham Bears won the toss and elected to field.				New Road, Worcester; Umpires: Neil Bainton and Nigel Cowley; Player of the match: Ian Bell (Birmingham Bears)

7 July	Yorkshire Vikings (H); 227/5 (20 overs)	v	Nottinghamshire Outlaws; 179/8 (20 overs)	Yorkshire Vikings won by 48 runs
Scorecard	Yorkshire Vikings (H); 227/5 (20 overs)	v	Nottinghamshire Outlaws; 179/8 (20 overs)	Headingley, Leeds; Umpires: Neil Mallender and Steve O'Shaugnessy; Player of the match: Adam Lyth (Yorkshire Vikings)
Scorecard	Adam Lyth 82 (50); Harry Gurney 3/49 (4 overs)		Alex Hales 47 (26); Azeem Rafiq 2/38 (4 overs)	Headingley, Leeds; Umpires: Neil Mallender and Steve O'Shaugnessy; Player of the match: Adam Lyth (Yorkshire Vikings)
Yorkshire Vikings won the toss and elected to bat.				Headingley, Leeds; Umpires: Neil Mallender and Steve O'Shaugnessy; Player of the match: Adam Lyth (Yorkshire Vikings)

7 July	Lancashire Lightning; 192/6 (20 overs)	v	Durham Jets (H); 140/7 (20 overs)	Lancashire Lightning won by 52 runs
Scorecard	Lancashire Lightning; 192/6 (20 overs)	v	Durham Jets (H); 140/7 (20 overs)	Riverside Ground, Chester-le-Street; Umpires: Russell Warren and Tim Robinson; Player of the match: Jos Buttler (Lancashire Lightning)
Scorecard	Jos Buttler 59 (39); James Weighell 3/28 (4 overs)		Paul Collingwood 48 (39); Jordan Clark 3/26 (4 overs)	Riverside Ground, Chester-le-Street; Umpires: Russell Warren and Tim Robinson; Player of the match: Jos Buttler (Lancashire Lightning)
Durham Jets won the toss and elected to field.				Riverside Ground, Chester-le-Street; Umpires: Russell Warren and Tim Robinson; Player of the match: Jos Buttler (Lancashire Lightning)

7 July	Northamptonshire Steelbacks (H); 179/6 (20 overs)	v	Derbyshire Falcons; 180/3 (19.1 overs)	Derbyshire Falcons won by 7 wickets
Scorecard	Northamptonshire Steelbacks (H); 179/6 (20 overs)	v	Derbyshire Falcons; 180/3 (19.1 overs)	County Ground, Northampton; Umpires: Jeremy Lloyds and Paul Pollard; Player of the match: Luis Reece (Derbyshire Falcons)
Scorecard	Ben Duckett 69 (52); Hardus Viljoen 3/28 (4 overs)		Luis Reece 75* (51); Josh Cobb 1/16 (2 overs)	County Ground, Northampton; Umpires: Jeremy Lloyds and Paul Pollard; Player of the match: Luis Reece (Derbyshire Falcons)
Derbyshire Falcons won the toss and elected to field.				County Ground, Northampton; Umpires: Jeremy Lloyds and Paul Pollard; Player of the match: Luis Reece (Derbyshire Falcons)

8 July	Derbyshire Falcons (H); 165/8 (20 overs)	v	Yorkshire Vikings; 162/7 (20 overs)	Derbyshire Falcons won by 3 runs
Scorecard	Derbyshire Falcons (H); 165/8 (20 overs)	v	Yorkshire Vikings; 162/7 (20 overs)	Queen's Park, Chesterfield; Umpires: Peter Hartley and Stephen Gale; Player of the match: Wayne Madsen (Derbyshire Falcons
Scorecard	Wayne Madsen 42 (28); Steven Patterson 2/19 (4 overs)		Adam Lyth 68 (54); Imran Tahir 3/18 (4 overs)	Queen's Park, Chesterfield; Umpires: Peter Hartley and Stephen Gale; Player of the match: Wayne Madsen (Derbyshire Falcons
Derbyshire Falcons won the toss and elected to bat.				Queen's Park, Chesterfield; Umpires: Peter Hartley and Stephen Gale; Player of the match: Wayne Madsen (Derbyshire Falcons

8 July	Nottinghamshire Outlaws; 158/6 (20 overs)	v	Birmingham Bears (H); 159/4 (20 overs)	Birmingham Bears won by 6 wickets
Scorecard	Nottinghamshire Outlaws; 158/6 (20 overs)	v	Birmingham Bears (H); 159/4 (20 overs)	Edgbaston, Birmingham; Umpires: Jeff Evans and Mike Burns; Player of the match: Jeetan Patel (Birmingham Bears)
Scorecard	Samit Patel 55 (33); Jeetan Patel 4/22 (4 overs)		Ian Bell 47 (38); Samit Patel 1/23 (4 overs)	Edgbaston, Birmingham; Umpires: Jeff Evans and Mike Burns; Player of the match: Jeetan Patel (Birmingham Bears)
Birmingham Bears won the toss and elected to field.				Edgbaston, Birmingham; Umpires: Jeff Evans and Mike Burns; Player of the match: Jeetan Patel (Birmingham Bears)

9 July	Lancashire Lightning (H); 173/9 (20 overs)	v	Leicestershire Foxes; 178/7 (20 overs)	Leicestershire Foxes won by 3 wickets
Scorecard	Lancashire Lightning (H); 173/9 (20 overs)	v	Leicestershire Foxes; 178/7 (20 overs)	Aigburth Cricket Ground, Liverpool; Umpires: Graham Lloyd and Richard Illingworth; Player of the match: Colin Ackermann (Leicestershire Foxes)
Scorecard	Liam Livingstone 48 (34); Clint McKay 3/29 (4 overs)		Colin Ackermann 62* (41); Danny Lamb 3/30 (4 overs)	Aigburth Cricket Ground, Liverpool; Umpires: Graham Lloyd and Richard Illingworth; Player of the match: Colin Ackermann (Leicestershire Foxes)
Leicestershire Foxes won the toss and elected to field.				Aigburth Cricket Ground, Liverpool; Umpires: Graham Lloyd and Richard Illingworth; Player of the match: Colin Ackermann (Leicestershire Foxes)

9 July	Durham Jets (H); 161/7 (20 overs)	v	Northamptonshire Steelbacks; 162/4 (19.2 overs)	Northamptonshire Steelbacks won by 6 wickets
Scorecard	Durham Jets (H); 161/7 (20 overs)	v	Northamptonshire Steelbacks; 162/4 (19.2 overs)	Riverside Ground, Chester-le-Street; Umpires: Neil Mallender and Nick Cook; Player of the match: Ben Duckett (Northamptonshire Steelbacks)
Scorecard	Jack Burnham 53* (41); Rory Kleinveldt 3/28 (4 overs)		Ben Duckett 72 (56); James Weighell 2/30 (3.2 overs)	Riverside Ground, Chester-le-Street; Umpires: Neil Mallender and Nick Cook; Player of the match: Ben Duckett (Northamptonshire Steelbacks)
Northamptonshire Steelbacks won the toss and elected to field.				Riverside Ground, Chester-le-Street; Umpires: Neil Mallender and Nick Cook; Player of the match: Ben Duckett (Northamptonshire Steelbacks)

11 July	Northamptonshire Steelbacks (H)	v	Yorkshire Vikings	Match abandoned
Scorecard	Northamptonshire Steelbacks (H)	v	Yorkshire Vikings	County Ground, Northampton; Umpires: Alex Wharf and Michael Gough
No toss; No play possible due to rain.				County Ground, Northampton; Umpires: Alex Wharf and Michael Gough

== South Group ==
=== Table ===
Pos	Team	Pld	W	L	T	NR	Ded	Pts	NRR
1	Glamorgan	14	7	3	0	4	0	18	0.045
2	Surrey	14	7	5	0	2	0	16	−0.130
3	Hampshire	14	7	6	0	1	0	15	−0.021
4	Somerset	14	6	6	0	2	0	14	0.491
5	Sussex Sharks	14	5	5	1	3	0	14	0.423
6	Kent Spitfires	14	6	7	1	0	0	13	−0.158
7	Middlesex	14	5	7	1	1	0	12	0.221
8	Essex Eagles	14	5	7	0	2	0	12	−0.204
9	Gloucestershire	14	4	6	1	3	0	12	−0.648

Source: BBC Sport

=== July ===
7 July	Gloucestershire (H); 182/5 (20 overs)	v	Middlesex; 182/9 (20 overs)	Match tied
Scorecard	Gloucestershire (H); 182/5 (20 overs)	v	Middlesex; 182/9 (20 overs)	College Ground, Cheltenham; Umpires: Graham Lloyd and Ian Blackwell; Player of the match: Ryan Higgins (Middlesex)
Scorecard	Cameron Bancroft 51 (31); Tim Southee 2/39 (4 overs)		Ryan Higgins 68* (28); Benny Howell 2/31 (4 overs)	College Ground, Cheltenham; Umpires: Graham Lloyd and Ian Blackwell; Player of the match: Ryan Higgins (Middlesex)
Middlesex won the toss and elected to field.				College Ground, Cheltenham; Umpires: Graham Lloyd and Ian Blackwell; Player of the match: Ryan Higgins (Middlesex)

7 July	Hampshire; 167/5 (20 overs)	v	Glamorgan (H); 145/9 (20 overs)	Hampshire won by 22 runs
(D/N); Scorecard	Hampshire; 167/5 (20 overs)	v	Glamorgan (H); 145/9 (20 overs)	Sophia Gardens, Cardiff; Umpires: Russell Evans and Tom Lungley; Player of the match: Lewis McManus (Hampshire)
(D/N); Scorecard	Lewis McManus 59 (35); Michael Hogan 2/25 (4 overs)		Graham Wagg 50 (28); Shahid Afridi 4/20 (4 overs)	Sophia Gardens, Cardiff; Umpires: Russell Evans and Tom Lungley; Player of the match: Lewis McManus (Hampshire)
Glamorgan won the toss and elected to field.				Sophia Gardens, Cardiff; Umpires: Russell Evans and Tom Lungley; Player of the match: Lewis McManus (Hampshire)

7 July	Surrey; 188/8 (20 overs)	v	Essex Eagles (H); 186/6 (20 overs)	Surrey won by 2 runs
(D/N); Scorecard	Surrey; 188/8 (20 overs)	v	Essex Eagles (H); 186/6 (20 overs)	County Ground, Chelmsford; Umpires: David Millns and Richard Kettleborough; Player of the match: Tom Curran (Surrey)
(D/N); Scorecard	Dom Sibley 61 (40); Ravi Bopara 2/23 (4 overs)		Ravi Bopara 75 (46); Tom Curran 3/28 (4 overs)	County Ground, Chelmsford; Umpires: David Millns and Richard Kettleborough; Player of the match: Tom Curran (Surrey)
Essex Eagles won the toss and elected to field.				County Ground, Chelmsford; Umpires: David Millns and Richard Kettleborough; Player of the match: Tom Curran (Surrey)

9 July	Glamorgan; 198/3 (20 overs)	v	Sussex Sharks (H); 180/6 (20 overs)	Glamorgan won by 18 runs
Scorecard	Glamorgan; 198/3 (20 overs)	v	Sussex Sharks (H); 180/6 (20 overs)	Arundel Castle Cricket Ground, Arundel; Umpires: Billy Taylor and Martin Saggers; Player of the match: Colin Ingram (Glamorgan)
Scorecard	Colin Ingram 101* (47); Danny Briggs 1/28 (4 overs)		Luke Wright 101 (53); Michael Hogan 2/22 (4 overs)	Arundel Castle Cricket Ground, Arundel; Umpires: Billy Taylor and Martin Saggers; Player of the match: Colin Ingram (Glamorgan)
Sussex Sharks won the toss and elected to field.				Arundel Castle Cricket Ground, Arundel; Umpires: Billy Taylor and Martin Saggers; Player of the match: Colin Ingram (Glamorgan)

9 July	Surrey (H); 181/7 (20 overs)	v	Somerset; 177/9 (20 overs)	Surrey won by 4 runs
Scorecard	Surrey (H); 181/7 (20 overs)	v	Somerset; 177/9 (20 overs)	The Oval, London; Umpires: David Millns and Paul Baldwin; Player of the match: Tom Curran (Surrey)
Scorecard	Aaron Finch 61 (42); Roelof van der Merwe 3/27 (4 overs)		Corey Anderson 81 (45); Sam Curran 2/22 (4 overs)	The Oval, London; Umpires: David Millns and Paul Baldwin; Player of the match: Tom Curran (Surrey)
Somerset won the toss and elected to field.				The Oval, London; Umpires: David Millns and Paul Baldwin; Player of the match: Tom Curran (Surrey)

9 July	Essex Eagles; 166/8 (20 overs)	v	Kent Spitfires (H); 169/3 (18.3 overs)	Kent Spitfires won by 7 wickets
Scorecard	Essex Eagles; 166/8 (20 overs)	v	Kent Spitfires (H); 169/3 (18.3 overs)	County Ground, Kent; Umpires: Alex Wharf and Richard Kettleborough; Player of the match: Daniel Bell-Drummond (Kent Spitfires)
Scorecard	Varun Chopra 47 (38); James Neesham 3/37 (4 overs)		Daniel Bell-Drummond 90* (55); Simon Harmer 2/21 (4 overs)	County Ground, Kent; Umpires: Alex Wharf and Richard Kettleborough; Player of the match: Daniel Bell-Drummond (Kent Spitfires)
Essex Eagles won the toss and elected to bat.				County Ground, Kent; Umpires: Alex Wharf and Richard Kettleborough; Player of the match: Daniel Bell-Drummond (Kent Spitfires)

12 July	Hampshire; 188/3 (20 overs)	v	Sussex Sharks (H); 169/7 (20 overs)	Hampshire won by 19 runs
(D/N); Scorecard	Hampshire; 188/3 (20 overs)	v	Sussex Sharks (H); 169/7 (20 overs)	County Ground, Hove; Umpires: Jeremy Lloyds and Neil Mallender; Player of the match: Kyle Abbott (Hampshire)
(D/N); Scorecard	James Vince 81 (48); Will Beer 1/27 (3 overs)		Luke Wright 50 (33); Kyle Abbott 3/22 (4 overs)	County Ground, Hove; Umpires: Jeremy Lloyds and Neil Mallender; Player of the match: Kyle Abbott (Hampshire)
Sussex Sharks won the toss and elected to field.				County Ground, Hove; Umpires: Jeremy Lloyds and Neil Mallender; Player of the match: Kyle Abbott (Hampshire)

13 July	Kent Spitfires; 152/8 (20 overs)	v	Gloucestershire (H); 156/4 (19.1 overs)	Gloucestershire won by 6 wickets
Scorecard	Kent Spitfires; 152/8 (20 overs)	v	Gloucestershire (H); 156/4 (19.1 overs)	College Ground, Cheltenham; Umpires: Russell Evans and Tim Robinson; Player of the match: Benny Howell (Gloucestershire)
Scorecard	Joe Denly 39 (24); Benny Howell 4/29 (4 overs)		Phil Mustard 42 (26); Adam Milne 2/28 (4 overs)	College Ground, Cheltenham; Umpires: Russell Evans and Tim Robinson; Player of the match: Benny Howell (Gloucestershire)
Gloucestershire won the toss and elected to field.				College Ground, Cheltenham; Umpires: Russell Evans and Tim Robinson; Player of the match: Benny Howell (Gloucestershire)

== Knockout stage ==
Quarter-finals
Glamorgan	126/1
Leicestershire Foxes	123
Surrey	204/5
Birmingham Bears	207/4
Hampshire	249/8
Derbyshire Falcons	148
Nottinghamshire Outlaws	152/5
Somerset	151/6

Semi-finals
Glamorgan	164
Birmingham Bears	175/9
Hampshire	146
Nottinghamshire Outlaws	169/7

Final
Birmingham Bears	168/8
Nottinghamshire Outlaws	190/4

=== Quarter-finals ===
Quarter-final 1
22 August 2017 (D/N)
Scorecard

Hampshire; 249/8 (20 overs)	v	Derbyshire Falcons; 148 (19.5 overs)
Shahid Afridi 101 (43); Matt Critchley 3/32 (3 overs)		Ben Cotton 30* (21); Kyle Abbott 3/25 (3.5 overs)

Hampshire won by 101 runs
County Ground, Hove
Umpires: Alex Wharf and Michael Gough
Player of the match: Shahid Afridi (Hampshire)

- Derbyshire Falcons won the toss and elected to field.

Quarter-final 2
23 August 2017 (D/N)
Scorecard

Leicestershire Foxes; 123 (19.2 overs)	v	Glamorgan; 126/1 (13.4 overs)
Luke Ronchi 28 (18); Craig Meschede 3/17 (4 overs)		Colin Ingram 70* (43); Clint McKay 1/17 (3 overs)

Glamorgan won by 9 wickets
Sophia Gardens, Cardiff
Umpires: Rob Bailey and Steve O'Shaughnessy
Player of the match: Colin Ingram (Glamorgan)

- Leicestershire Foxes won the toss and elected to bat.

Quarter-final 3
24 August 2017 (D/N)
Scorecard

Somerset; 151/6 (20 overs)	v	Nottinghamshire Outlaws; 152/5 (18.3 overs)
Steven Davies 59 (41); Jake Ball 2/21 (4 overs)		Samit Patel 45 (28); Lewis Gregory 1/20 (3.3 overs)

Nottinghamshire Outlaws won by 5 wickets
Trent Bridge, Nottingham
Umpires: David Millns and Neil Mallender
Player of the match: Samit Patel (Nottinghamshire Outlaws)

- Nottinghamshire Outlaws won the toss and elected to field.

Quarter-final 4
25 August 2017 (D/N)
Scorecard

Surrey; 204/5 (20 overs)	v	Birmingham Bears; 207/4 (19.2 overs)
Jason Roy 74 (38); Aaron Thomason 2/26 (3 overs)		Grant Elliott 59* (37); Rikki Clarke 2/56 (3.2 overs)

Birmingham Bears won by 6 wickets
The Oval, London
Umpires: Martin Saggers and Tim Robinson
Player of the match: Grant Elliott (Birmingham Bears)

- Birmingham Bears won the toss and elected to field.

== Finals Day ==
=== Semi-finals ===
Semi-final 1
2 September 2017
Scorecard

Birmingham Bears; 175/9 (20 overs)	v	Glamorgan; 164 (19.4 overs)
Ed Pollock 50 (27); Craig Meschede 2/24 (4 overs)		Jacques Rudolph 65 (39); Olly Stone 3/29 (4 overs)

Birmingham Bears won by 11 runs
Edgbaston, Birmingham
Umpires: Alex Wharf and Tim Robinson
Player of the match: Ed Pollock (Birmingham Bears)

- Glamorgan won the toss and elected to field.

Semi-final 2
2 September 2017
Scorecard

Nottinghamshire Outlaws; 169/7 (20 overs)	v	Hampshire; 146 (18.4 overs)
Riki Wessels 48 (27); Chris Wood 2/17 (2 overs)		James Vince 56 (32); Harry Gurney 3/19 (3 overs)

Nottinghamshire Outlaws won by 23 runs
Edgbaston, Birmingham
Umpires: Michael Gough and Rob Bailey
Player of the match: Steven Mullaney (Nottinghamshire Outlaws)

- Hampshire won the toss and elected to field.

=== Final ===
Final
2 September 2017 (D/N)
Scorecard

Nottinghamshire Outlaws; 190/4 (20 overs)	v	Birmingham Bears; 168/8 (20 overs)
Brendan Taylor 65 (49); Chris Woakes 3/29 (4 overs)		Sam Hain 72 (44); Harry Gurney 4/17 (4 overs)

Nottinghamshire Outlaws won by 22 runs
Edgbaston, Birmingham
Umpires: Alex Wharf and Michael Gough
Player of the match: Samit Patel (Nottinghamshire Outlaws)

- Birmingham Bears won the toss and elected to field.

== Personnel ==
Team	Coach	Captain	Overseas Player(s)
Birmingham Bears	(England) Jim Troughton	(New Zealand) Grant Elliott	(New Zealand) Jeetan Patel, (New Zealand) Colin de Grandhomme
Derbyshire Falcons	(New Zealand) John Wright	(Ireland) Gary Wilson	(New Zealand) Matt Henry, (South Africa) Imran Tahir
Durham Jets	(England) Jon Lewis	(England) Paul Coughlin	(New Zealand) Tom Latham
Essex Eagles	(England) Chris Silverwood	(Netherlands) Ryan ten Doeschate	(Pakistan) Mohammad Amir, (Bangladesh) Tamim Iqbal, (New Zealand) Neil Wagner
Glamorgan	(Wales) Robert Croft	(South Africa) Jacques Rudolph	(South Africa) Jacques Rudolph
Gloucestershire	(England) Richard Dawson	(Australia) Michael Klinger	(Australia) Michael Klinger, (Australia) Cameron Bancroft, (Sri Lanka) Thisara Perera
Hampshire	(England) Craig White	(England) James Vince	(Australia) George Bailey, (Pakistan) Shahid Afridi
Kent Spitfires	(England) Matt Walker	(England) Sam Northeast	(New Zealand) Adam Milne, (New Zealand) Jimmy Neesham
Lancashire Lightning	(England) Glen Chapple	(England) Steven Croft	(Pakistan) Junaid Khan, (South Africa) Ryan McLaren
Leicestershire Foxes	(South Africa) Pierre de Bruyn	(Australia) Clint McKay	(Australia) Clint McKay, (New Zealand) Luke Ronchi
Middlesex	(New Zealand) Daniel Vettori	(England) Dawid Malan / (New Zealand) Brendon McCullum	(New Zealand) Brendon McCullum, (New Zealand) Tim Southee
Northamptonshire Steelbacks	(England) David Ripley	(England) Alex Wakely	(South Africa) Tabraiz Shamsi, (Sri Lanka) Seekuge Prasanna
Nottinghamshire Outlaws	(England) Peter Moores	(Australia) Dan Christian	(Australia) Dan Christian, (New Zealand) Ish Sodhi
Somerset	(England) Matthew Maynard	(Australia) Jim Allenby	(New Zealand) Corey Anderson, (South Africa) Dean Elgar
Surrey	(Australia) Michael Di Venuto	(England) Gareth Batty	(Australia) Aaron Finch, (Sri Lanka) Kumar Sangakkara, (Australia) Moisés Henriques
Sussex Sharks	(South Africa) Mark Davis	(New Zealand) Ross Taylor	(New Zealand) Ross Taylor
Worcestershire Rapids	(England) Steve Rhodes	(England) Joe Leach	(Australia) John Hastings, (New Zealand) Mitchell Santner
Yorkshire Vikings	(England) Andrew Gale	(England) Gary Ballance / (England) Tim Bresnan	(Australia) Peter Handscomb, (Australia) Shaun Marsh, (Pakistan) Sarfraz Ahmed
