= List of Dhaka Capitals cricketers =

This is presenting a complete list in alphabetical order of cricketers who have played for Dhaka Capitals in Twenty20 matches held by the Bangladesh Premier League. The Dhaka Dynamites franchise was formed ahead of the 2015 BPL edition, replacing the former Dhaka Gladiators team which participated in the 2012 and 2013 BPL editions. The list includes all players who represented the Gladiators. Complying with other club lists, details are the player's name followed by his years active as a Dhaka Gladiators/Dynamites/Capitals player, current players to the end of the 2015–16 Bangladeshi cricket season.

== A ==
- Abul Hasan (2015–16)
- Aftab Ahmed (2011–12)
- Anamul Haque (2011–12 to 2012–13)
- Awais Zia (Pakistan; 2011–12)
- Azhar Mahmood (Pakistan; 2011–12)

== C ==
- Josh Cobb (England; 2012–13)

== D ==
- Dhiman Ghosh (2011–12)
- Tillakaratne Dilshan (Sri Lanka; 2012–13)

== E ==
- Elias Sunny (2011–12)

== F ==
- Farhad Reza (2015–16)

== G ==
- Chris Gayle (West Indies; 2012–13)

== I ==
- Imran Nazir (Pakistan; 2011–12)
- Irfan Shukkur (2015–16)

== K ==
- Alexei Kervezee (Netherlands; 2011–12)

== L ==
- Chris Liddle (England; 2012–13)
- Liton Das (2012–13)
- Kaushal Lokuarachchi (Sri Lanka; 2012–13)

== M ==
- Mahbubul Alam (2012–13)
- Mashrafe Mortaza (2011–12 to 2012–13)
- Mehrab Hossain junior (2011–12)
- Mohammad Ashraful (2011–12 to 2012–13)
- Mohammad Hafeez (Pakistan; 2015–16)
- Mohammad Irfan (Pakistan; 2015–16)
- Mohammad Nazmul Hossain (2011–12)
- Mosaddek Hossain (2015–16)
- Mosharraf Hossain (2011–12 to 2015–16)
- Mustafizur Rahman (2015–16)

== N ==
- Nabil Samad (2015–16)
- Nasir Hossain (2015–16)
- Nasir Jamshed (Pakistan; 2015–16)
- Naved-ul-Hasan (Pakistan; 2011–12)
- Nazimuddin (2011–12)

== O ==
- Owais Shah (England; 2012–13)

== P ==
- Kieron Pollard (West Indies; 2011–12 to 2012–13)

== R ==
- Raqibul Hasan (2012–13)

== S ==
- Saeed Ajmal (Pakistan; 2011–12)
- Saikat Ali (2015–16)
- Kumar Sangakkara (Sri Lanka; 2015–16)
- Saqlain Sajib (2012–13)
- Shadman Islam (2015–16)
- Shahid Afridi (Pakistan; 2011–12)
- Shakib Al Hasan (2012–13)
- Shamsur Rahman (2015–16)
- Sohail Khan (Pakistan; 2015–16)
- Soumya Sarkar (2012–13)
- Darren Stevens (England; 2011–12 to 2012–13)

== T ==
- Ryan ten Doeschate (Netherlands; 2015–16)
- Lahiru Thirimanne (Sri Lanka; 2015–16)
- Alfonso Thomas (South Africa; 2012–13)

== W ==
- Malcolm Waller (Zimbabwe; 2015–16)
- Luke Wright (England; 2012–13)

== Y ==
- Yasir Shah (Pakistan; 2015–16)
