= List of South Zone cricketers (Bangladesh) =

This is presenting a complete list in alphabetical order of cricketers who have played for South Zone in first-class, List A or Twenty20 matches since the team was formed ahead of the 2012–13 season for the first Bangladesh Cricket League (BCL) competition. South Zone is a composite regional team which combines two divisional teams, Barisal and Khulna. Complying with other team lists, details are the player's name followed by his years active as a South Zone player, current players to the end of the 2015–16 season.

== A ==
- Abdur Razzak (2012–13 to 2015–16)
- Al-Amin Hossain (2013–14 to 2014–15)
- Anamul Haque (2012–13 to 2015–16)
- Asif Hasan (2015–16)

== E ==
- Enamul Haque (2014–15 to 2015–16)

== F ==
- Farhad Reza (2015–16)
- Fazle Mahmud (2012–13 to 2015–16)

== I ==
- Imrul Kayes (2012–13 to 2015–16)

== K ==
- Kamrul Islam Rabbi (2012–13)

== M ==
- Mashrafe Mortaza (2014–15)
- Mehedi Hasan (2015–16)
- Mohammad Mithun Ali (2012–13 to 2015–16)
- Mosaddek Hossain (2014–15 to 2015–16)
- Moynul Islam (2015–16)
- Murad Khan (2012–13)
- Mustafizur Rahman (2013–14 to 2014–15)

== N ==
- Nazmul Hossain (2015–16)
- Nazmul Islam (2013–14)
- Nurul Hasan (2014–15)

== R ==
- Robiul Islam (2012–13 to 2015–16)
- Rubel Hossain (2012–13 to 2014–15)

== S ==
- Saikat Ali (2014–15)
- Shafaq Al Zabir (2012–13)
- Shahriar Nafees (2014–15 to 2015–16)
- Shuvagata Hom (2013–14)
- Sohag Gazi (2012–13 to 2015–16)
- Soumya Sarkar (2012–13 to 2014–15)

== T ==
- Taibur Rahman (2013–14 to 2015–16)
- Taposh Ghosh (2012–13)
- Towhidul Islam (2015–16)
- Tushar Imran (2012–13 to 2015–16)

== Z ==
- Ziaur Rahman (2012–13 to 2015–16)
