= Danny Lamb =

English cricketer (born 1995)

Personal information
- Full name: Daniel John Lamb
- Born: 7 September 1995 (age 31); Preston, Lancashire, England
- Batting: Right-handed
- Bowling: Right-arm medium
- Role: All-rounder
- Relatives: Emma Lamb (sister)

Domestic team information
- Years: Team
- 2017–2023: Lancashire (squad no. 26)
- 2023: → Gloucestershire (on loan)
- 2023: → Somerset (on loan)
- 2024–2026: Sussex (squad no. 10)
- First-class debut: 20 June 2018 Lancashire v Worcestershire
- List A debut: 14 May 2017 Lancashire v Nottinghamshire

Career statistics
Competition	FC	LA	T20
Matches	38	34	83
Runs scored	1,232	592	578
Batting average	28.65	32.88	15.62
100s/50s	2/5	0/4	0/0
Top score	134	86*	49
Balls bowled	4,106	1,641	1,310
Wickets	68	45	61
Bowling average	33.13	35.15	33.00
5 wickets in innings	0	1	1
10 wickets in match	0	0	0
Best bowling	4/55	5/30	5/15
Catches/stumpings	13/–	18/–	13/–
- Source: ESPNcricinfo, 12 August 2026

Daniel John Lamb (born 7 September 1995) is an English former cricketer who played as an all-rounder for Lancashire, Gloucestershire, Somerset and Sussex.

== Personal life ==
Lamb is from Preston, Lancashire, England, and attended St Michael's Church of England High School, Chorley. His sister Emma is also a cricketer.

== Career ==
Lamb has played club cricket for Bramhall in the Cheshire County Cricket League, and Leigh.

In 2015, Lamb signed a scholarship deal with Lancashire, having already featured in Second XI matches for them. Lamb made his List A debut for Lancashire in the 2017 Royal London One-Day Cup on 14 May 2017. He made his Twenty20 debut for Lancashire in the 2017 NatWest t20 Blast on 9 July 2017. In June 2018, Lamb made his first-class debut as a Concussion substitute for Joe Mennie. He was the first concussion substitute in English cricket. He made six appearances in the 2018 t20 Blast, as Lancashire reached the finals day. Later in same year, he signed a contract with Lancashire until 2020.

In a 2019 match against Glamorgan, Lamb took 4/70. In April 2021, during the 2021 County Championship match against Kent, Lamb scored his maiden century in first-class cricket with 125 runs. In July 2021, in the 2021 Royal London One-Day Cup, Lamb took his first five-wicket haul in List A cricket.

In June 2023, he agreed a three+year contract to join Sussex from the start of the 2024 season.

Acting on medical advice due to a spinal cord injury, Lamb announced his retirement from professional cricket on 12 August 2026.
