= Shamimul Haque =

Bangladeshi cricketer

Cricket information
- Batting: Right-handed

Career statistics
Competition	First-class	List A
Matches	26	25
Runs scored	736	322
Batting average	22.30	20.12
100s/50s	0/3	0/3
Top score	59	60
Catches/stumpings	67/3	37/2
- Source: CricketArchive, 30 December 2021

Shamimul Haque, also known as Shamimul Hoque and Bidyut is a first-class and List A cricketer from Bangladesh. He was born on 6 July 1984 in Rajshahi and is a right-handed batsman and wicket keeper. Sometimes referred to on scoresheets by his nickname Bidyut he played for Rajshahi Division from 2001/02 to 2005/06. He also appeared for the Bangladesh Cricket Board XI in 1999/00 and the Bangladesh Cricket Board Development Squad in 2002/03.

He made 3 first-class fifties, with a best of 59 against Dhaka Division and 3 more in one day games, with a best of 60 against Khulna Division.
