= James Weighell =

English cricketer (born 1994)

Personal information
- Full name: William James Weighell
- Born: 28 January 1994 (age 32); Middlesbrough, North Yorkshire, England
- Batting: Left-handed
- Bowling: Right-arm medium

Domestic team information
- Years: Team
- 2015–2020: Durham (squad no. 28)
- 2020: → Leicestershire (on loan)
- 2021–2022: Glamorgan
- FC debut: 21 August 2015 Durham v Middlesex
- LA debut: 27 April 2017 Durham v Derbyshire

Career statistics
Competition	FC	LA	T20
Matches	24	24	44
Runs scored	676	126	239
Batting average	21.80	10.50	14.05
100s/50s	0/3	0/0	0/1
Top score	84	33	51
Balls bowled	3,689	1,144	699
Wickets	65	38	28
Bowling average	33.93	30.10	39.67
5 wickets in innings	2	1	0
10 wickets in match	0	0	0
Best bowling	7/32	5/57	3/28
Catches/stumpings	7/–	9/–	20/–
- Source: ESPNcricinfo, 29 September 2022

William James Weighell (born 28 January 1994) is an English cricketer who has played for Durham, Leicestershire and Glamorgan. He made his first-class debut in 2015. Primarily a left-handed batsman, he also bowls right-arm medium. He made his List A debut for Durham in the 2017 Royal London One-Day Cup on 27 April 2017. He made his Twenty20 debut for Durham in the 2017 NatWest t20 Blast on 7 July 2017.

Durham announced in July 2020 that Weighell would leave the club when his contract expired. Leicestershire stated on 6 August 2020, that they had signed Weighell on loan until the end of the 2020 season. He joined Glamorgan for the 2021 season.
