= Kevin Evans (cricketer) =

English cricketer

Personal information
- Full name: Kevin Paul Evans
- Born: 10 September 1963 (age 63); Nottingham, Nottinghamshire, England
- Batting: Right-handed
- Bowling: Right-arm medium-fast
- Relatives: Russell Evans (brother)

Domestic team information
- Years: Team
- 2000–2001: Shropshire
- 1984–1999: Nottinghamshire

Career statistics
Competition	First-class	List A
Matches	161	213
Runs scored	4,198	1,324
Batting average	23.85	15.57
100s/50s	3/21	–/1
Top score	104	55*
Balls bowled	24,811	9,810
Wickets	364	251
Bowling average	33.23	29.76
5 wickets in innings	10	2
10 wickets in match	–	–
Best bowling	6/40	6/10
Catches/stumpings	111/–	46/–
- Source: Cricinfo, 22 October 2011

Kevin Paul Evans (born 10 September 1963) is a former English cricketer. Evans was a right-handed batsman who bowled right-arm medium-fast. He was born at Nottingham, Nottinghamshire. He is the brother of former cricketer and umpire Russell Evans.

== Nottinghamshire ==
=== First-class ===
Having played for the Nottinghamshire Second XI since 1981, Evans made his first-class debut for Nottinghamshire against Cambridge University in 1984 at Trent Bridge. He played two further first-class matches in his debut season against the touring Sri Lankans and West Indians, as well as making his List A debut against Middlesex in the 1984 John Player Special League. First-class and List A appearances were few and far between for Evans between 1984 and 1987, but he eventually broke into the Nottinghamshire side on a regular basis in the 1988 season.

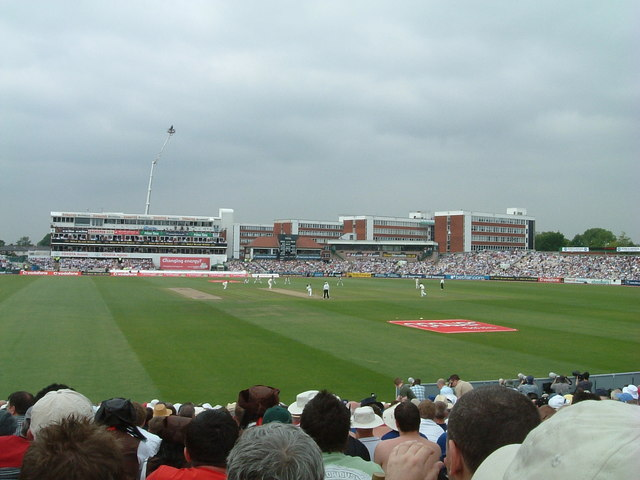
Evans took his career best first-class figures of 6/40 at Old Trafford in 1997

An all-rounder, Evans was able to provide valuable runs down the batting order, though he had mixed seasons and struggles with consistency. His most successful season with the bat in first-class cricket came in 1990 when he scored 738 runs at an average of 46.12, including making his maiden century against Somerset, which followed on from a duck he had made earlier in the match. His batting average mostly stuck around in the twenties and he only had an average higher than thirty in three seasons. It was a similar story with the ball for Evans in his first-class career, with him not taking a five wicket haul until the 1991 season. Typically, his bowling average season-to-season fluctuated in the late twenties to mid-thirties. He took 40 wickets or more in a season on three occasions, with the 1997 season being his most successful with 45 wickets at an average of 28.37 (though he did take 48 wickets in 1992, but at a higher average), which included his career best figures of 6/40 which came against Lancashire. Evans played a total of 161 first-class matches for Nottinghamshire between 1984 and 1999, scoring 4,198 runs at an average of 23.85, with a high score of 104, one of three centuries along with 21 half centuries he made. An able fielder, he also took 111 catches. Evans along with West Indian Jimmy Adams holds the record for the 9th wicket for Nottinghamshire with a partnership of 170. With the ball, he took 364 wickets at an average of 33.23, with best figures of 6/40, one of ten five wicket hauls he took.

=== List A ===
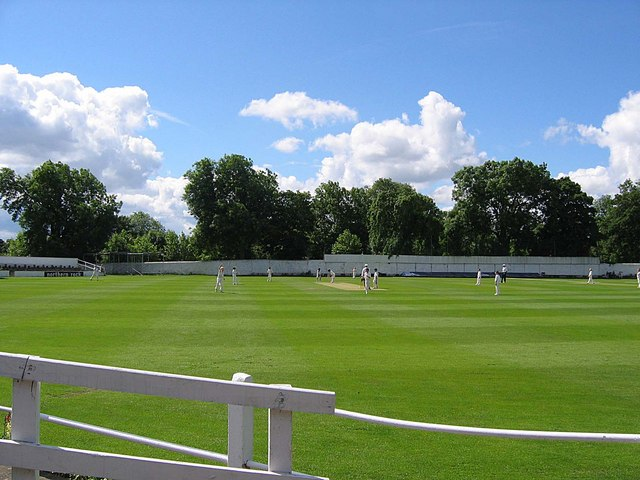
Evans took his career best List A figures of 6/10 at Osborne Avenue in 1994

In List A cricket it too was a similar story. Evans played twelve matches in that format in 1985, but it would not be until 1988 that he became a regular in that format for the county. Again, with the bat his season-to-season performance fluctuated, in the some seasons his average did not pass ten, in other seasons it was in the teens and in the odd season it entered the twenties or the thirties. One such season was in 1990, when he scored 139 runs at an average of 34.75, with included his only half century in that format, a score of 55 not out against Derbyshire in the semi-final of the Refuge Assurance Cup. He did though score more runs in a season, with 145 in 1995, though at a lower average. With the ball his average once more varied between a wide range, average between the early twenties and early forties. His most successful season with the ball in that format came in 1994 when he took 28 wickets at an average of 17.82, which included his best bowling figures of 6/10 which came against Northumberland in the NatWest Trophy at Osborne Avenue, Jesmond. He played a total of 209 matches for Nottinghamshire in that format, scoring 1,301 runs at an average of 15.67. With the ball, he took 245 wickets at an average of 29.80.

== Shropshire ==
After leaving Nottinghamshire at the end of the 1999 season, Evans proceeded to join Shropshire for the 2000 season, making his debut for the county against Herefordshire in the MCCA Knockout Trophy and in the same season making Minor Counties Championship debut against Oxfordshire. He made his first List A appearances for the county in the 2000 NatWest Trophy against the Surrey Cricket Board. He made three further List A appearances for Shropshire, the last of which came against Oxfordshire in the 2nd round of the 2002 Cheltenham & Gloucester Trophy, which was played in 2001 to avoid fixture congestion. He took 6 wickets in his four matches, which came at an average of 28.16, with best figures of 3/37, while with the bat he scored 23 runs at an average of 11.50, with a high score of 9 not out. He played Minor counties for Shropshire for just two seasons, having made thirteen Minor Counties Championship and six MCCA Knockout Trophy appearances.
