= Grant Thornton (cricketer) =

English cricketer (born 1992)

Personal information
- Full name: Grant Thomas Thornton
- Born: 29 August 1992 (age 34); Coventry, West Midlands, England
- Batting: Left-handed
- Bowling: Right-arm Fast-medium
- Role: Bowler

Domestic team information
- Years: Team
- 2017–present: Warwickshire
- First-class debut: 19 May 2017 Warwickshire v Somerset
- List A debut: 27 April 2017 Warwickshire v Northamptonshire

Career statistics
Competition	FC	LA
Matches	2	4
Runs scored	19	7
Batting average	9.50	7.00
100s/50s	0/0	0/0
Top score	10	7
Balls bowled	218	156
Wickets	4	8
Bowling average	34.50	23.12
5 wickets in innings	0	0
10 wickets in match	0	0
Best bowling	4/34	4/42
Catches/stumpings	0/–	1/–
- Source: ESPNcricinfo, 22 June 2017

Grant Thomas Thornton (born 29 August 1992) is an English cricketer. He made his List A debut for Warwickshire in the 2017 Royal London One-Day Cup on 27 April 2017. He made his first-class debut for Warwickshire in the 2017 County Championship on 19 May 2017.
