= Miles Richardson (cricketer) =

English cricketer (born 1991)

Personal information
- Full name: Miles Andrew Richardson
- Born: 26 August 1991 (age 35); Maidstone, Kent, England
- Batting: Right-handed
- Bowling: Right-arm medium-fast
- Role: Bowler

Domestic team information
- Years: Team
- 2017: Northamptonshire
- Only First-class: 2 April 2017 Northamptonshire v Loughborough MCCU
- Only List A: 30 April 2017 Northamptonshire v Derbyshire

Career statistics
Competition	FC	LA
Matches	1	1
Runs scored	–	1
Batting average	–	–
100s/50s	–/–	0/0
Top score	–	1*
Balls bowled	168	12
Wickets	0	0
Bowling average	–	–
5 wickets in innings	–	–
10 wickets in match	–	n/a
Best bowling	–	–
Catches/stumpings	0/–	0/–
- Source: ESPNcricinfo, 2 May 2017

Miles Andrew Richardson (born 26 August 1991) is an English cricketer. He made his first-class debut on 2 April 2017 for Northamptonshire against Loughborough MCCU as part of the Marylebone Cricket Club University fixtures. He made his List A debut for Northamptonshire in the 2017 Royal London One-Day Cup on 30 April 2017.
