= Taposh Ghosh =

Bangladeshi cricketer (born 1991)

Personal information
- Born: 11 August 1991 (age 35); Satkhira, Khulna, Bangladesh
- Batting: Left-handed
- Bowling: Slow left arm orthodox

Career statistics
Competition	FC	LA	T20
Matches	39	29	10
Runs scored	1,256	350	44
Batting average	20.93	15.90	22.00
100s/50s	2/6	0/0	0/0
Top score	150*	47	29*
Balls bowled	3,554	665	126
Wickets	54	13	3
Bowling average	36.22	50.46	58.66
5 wickets in innings	2	0	0
10 wickets in match	0	0	0
Best bowling	6/90	3/15	1/25
Catches/stumpings	28/–	13/–	1/–
- Source: ESPNcricinfo, 2 September 2017

Taposh Ghosh (born 11 August 1991) is a Bangladeshi cricketer. He is a left handed batsman and slow left-arm orthodox spin bowler. He has also played Under 19 Test and One Day International matches for his country.
