= Chris Liddle =

English cricketer (born 1984)

Personal information
- Full name: Christopher John Liddle
- Born: 1 February 1984 (age 42); Middlesbrough, England
- Nickname: Lids
- Height: 6 ft 4 in (1.93 m)
- Batting: Right-handed
- Bowling: Left-arm fast-medium

Domestic team information
- Years: Team
- 2004–2006: Leicestershire
- 2006–2015: Sussex (squad no. 11)
- 2013: Dhaka Gladiators
- 2016–2019: Gloucestershire

Career statistics
| Competition | FC | LA | T20 |
|---|---|---|---|
| Matches | 34 | 82 | 91 |
| Runs scored | 208 | 166 | 54 |
| Batting average | 11.55 | 6.91 | 6.75 |
| 100s/50s | 0/1 | 0/0 | 0/0 |
| Top score | 53 | 26 | 16 |
| Balls bowled | 4,144 | 3,323 | 1,697 |
| Wickets | 48 | 122 | 99 |
| Bowling average | 48.45 | 27.55 | 23.56 |
| 5 wickets in innings | 0 | 3 | 1 |
| 10 wickets in match | 0 | 0 | 0 |
| Best bowling | 3/42 | 5/18 | 5/17 |
| Catches/stumpings | 8/– | 22/– | 21/– |
- Source: CricketArchive, 29 September 2019

Christopher John Liddle (born 1 February 1984) is an English former cricketer and now cricket coach. As a player, he bowled left-arm seam and batted right-handed.

He started his career with Leicestershire, for whom he played seven first-class matches in the 2005 and 2006 seasons, but only played one limited overs match. In October 2006, Liddle signed with Sussex in October 2006. He mainly represented Sussex in limited overs cricket, taking a career best 5/17 against Middlesex in the T20 competition. In early 2013 he played for Dhaka Gladiators in the Bangladesh Premier League.

He was released by Sussex at the end of the 2015 season, and signed for Gloucestershire.

He announced his retirement from playing at the end of 2019, taking a role as bowling coach at Northamptonshire. In 2023 he took a similar role at the ECB working with England women.
