= Aaron Thomason =

English cricketer (born 1997)

Personal information
- Full name: Aaron Dean Thomason
- Born: 26 June 1997 (age 29); Birmingham, West Midlands, England
- Height: 5 ft 10 in (1.78 m)
- Batting: Right-handed
- Bowling: Right-arm fast-medium
- Role: All-rounder

Domestic team information
- Years: Team
- 2014–2019: Warwickshire (squad no. 26)
- 2019–present: Sussex (squad no. 24)
- First-class debut: 18 June 2019 Sussex v Worcestershire
- List A debut: 27 July 2014 Warwickshire v Middlesex

Career statistics
Competition	FC	LA	T20
Matches	16	17	37
Runs scored	619	176	325
Batting average	21.34	25.14	17.10
100s/50s	0/4	0/0	0/0
Top score	90	28	47
Balls bowled	469	388	372
Wickets	4	14	24
Bowling average	97.00	32.85	27.91
5 wickets in innings	0	0	0
10 wickets in match	0	0	0
Best bowling	2/107	4/45	3/33
Catches/stumpings	18/–	6/–	15/–
- Source: CricketArchive, 14 August 2021

Aaron Dean Thomason (born 26 June 1997) is an English cricketer who plays for Sussex County Cricket Club. Primarily a right-handed batsman, he also bowls right-arm fast-medium. He made his first-class debut on 18 June 2019, for Sussex in the 2019 County Championship.
