= Azeem Rafiq =

English cricketer (born 1991)

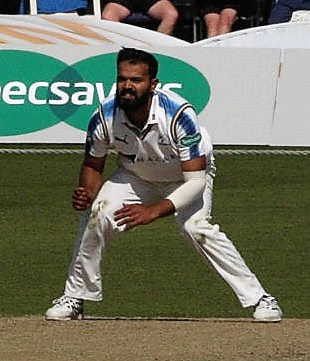
- Azeem Rafiq in 2017

Personal information
- Full name: Azeem Rafiq
- Born: 27 February 1991 (age 35); Karachi, Sindh, Pakistan
- Batting: Right-handed
- Bowling: Right-arm off break
- Role: All-rounder

Domestic team information
- Years: Team
- 2008–2014: Yorkshire (squad no. 30)
- 2011: → Derbyshire (on loan)
- 2016–2018: Yorkshire (squad no. 30)
- 2019: Lincolnshire
- FC debut: 6 June 2009 Yorkshire v Sussex
- LA debut: 30 August 2009 Yorkshire v Sussex

Career statistics
Competition	FC	LA	T20
Matches	39	35	95
Runs scored	873	252	153
Batting average	20.78	18.00	11.76
100s/50s	1/4	0/1	0/0
Top score	100	52*	21*
Balls bowled	5,433	1,353	1,937
Wickets	72	43	102
Bowling average	39.73	29.65	24.40
5 wickets in innings	1	1	1
10 wickets in match	0	0	0
Best bowling	5/50	5/30	5/19
Catches/stumpings	15/–	15/–	36/–
- Source: CricInfo, 6 November 2021

Azeem Rafiq (Urdu: عظیم رفیق; born 27 February 1991) is an English cricketer who played professionally in England for Yorkshire County Cricket Club. A right-arm off-spin bowler, Rafiq played for the county between 2008 and 2014 and 2016 and 2018, making his senior debut at the age of 17. He captained the England under-15 and under-19 teams, and in 2012 became the youngest man to captain a Yorkshire team as well as the first person of Asian origin to do so.

In September 2020, Rafiq made accusations of racism and bullying in Yorkshire. An independent report found that a number of his accusations were true and the case became a major media story in the United Kingdom. It led to several resignations at the club and was the subject of investigations by the England and Wales Cricket Board (ECB) and the Digital, Culture, Media and Sport Select Committee in the British parliament.

== Early life ==
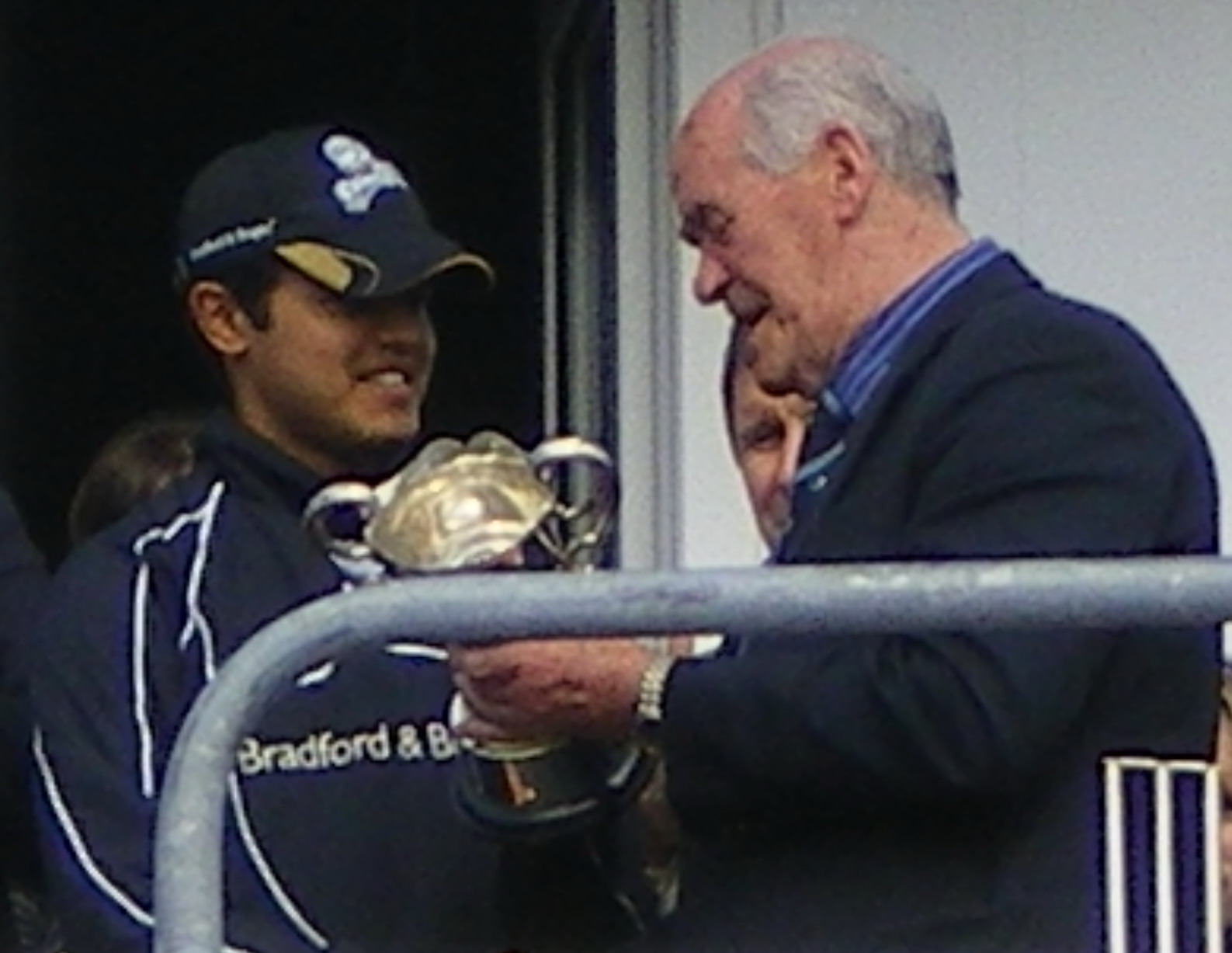
Brian Close awarded Rafiq the Yorkshire County Cricket Club Academy Player of the Year award in 2008.

Rafiq was born in Karachi, Pakistan, in 1991, one of five children, and moved to the United Kingdom in 2001. He grew up in Barnsley in South Yorkshire and attended Holgate School in the town; as a child he played cricket for Barnsley Cricket Club and Yorkshire schools teams. He was a member of Yorkshire's cricket academy and captained the England under-15 team in 2006.

The same year, Rafiq was the recipient of a Sport England award and came to the attention of England bowling coach David Parsons, who earmarked him as a possible future England bowler. He was Yorkshire's Junior Performer of the Year in 2007 and the club's academy player of the year in 2008 as well as being awarded a Brian Johnston Memorial Trust scholarship. He made his Second XI debut for the county during the same year.

== Senior cricket career ==
Rafiq made his senior debut for Yorkshire's First XI in a Twenty20 Cup match against Nottinghamshire in June 2008. He bowled two overs in the match which Yorkshire won. At the time however, Rafiq did not hold a UK passport and so did not qualify as a domestic player. Yorkshire, who were only allowed to register one overseas player for the competition, had not deregistered their other overseas player and, as a result, were expelled from the competition. (Note: At the time players were required to have a British passport to play in top-level competitions organised by the England and Wales Cricket Board, including the Twenty20 Cup. Rafiq, who held only a Pakistani passport at the time, was able to play in other competitions, including for England age-group teams and in Second XI competitions, but not at the top-level of domestic competition unless he was registered as an overseas player. He had been issued with appropriate visas and had the right to live in the United Kingdom, but had not yet received British citizenship.) In August Rafiq was given special dispensation by the England and Wales Cricket Board (ECB) to play for Yorkshire for the remainder of the season while his application for British citizenship was being processed; Rafiq's family had begun the process of applying for citizenship some time before, but the process had been "prolonged" by the Home Office.

His citizenship was confirmed later in the year and in October he signed a three-year senior contract with Yorkshire. He captained the county's academy team in a series of matches in Abu Dhabi during the winter and toured South Africa with the England under-19 team in early 2009.

=== England under-19 captaincy ===
Rafiq made his first-class and List-A debuts for Yorkshire during the 2009 season; aged 18, he scored a century for the team in his second first-class match. He played for England under-19s against Bangladesh during the summer, taking six wickets in an inning at Scarborough and another five-wicket haul at Derby in the two under-19 Test matches before captaining the team during the under-19 One Day International matches which followed.

He was captain of the team during the under-19 tour of Bangladesh later in the year, but gave up the role halfway through the ODI series, before being re-appointed to captain England at the Under-19 World Cup held in New Zealand in early 2010. Following the tournament, the team's then-coach Mark Robinson called Rafiq a "fierce competitor" and an "outstanding captain" who had "led the team really, really well".

Later in 2010, however, Rafiq was dropped from the team for breaking mid-match curfews during a series of matches against Sri Lanka under-19s; he responded by publishing an attack against the team's new coach John Abrahams on his Twitter account, deleting the tweets once he realised they were publicly viewable. Yorkshire suspended him and the ECB later gave him a one-month ban from all cricket as a result of the tweets.

=== Loan to Derbyshire ===
After spending the winter playing grade cricket in Australia, Rafiq spent a month at the start of the 2011 season on loan at Derbyshire County Cricket Club to play regular first-team cricket. (Note: In 2011 Yorkshire were playing in the first division of the County Championship and Derbyshire in the second division. The Derbyshire team was considered weaker than Yorkshire's and Rafiq had less competition for the role of spin bowler within the team. Yorkshire were relegated from the first division at the end of the season.) He played three County Championship and five Clydesdale Bank 40 matches for the county, taking 11 wickets in what was considered to have been a successful spell at the club, before returning to Yorkshire to play in their Twenty20 Cup campaign later in the season. Speaking after the loan, Rafiq said that he had gained confidence from his time at Derbyshire and "felt loved and wanted out there". At the end of the season he signed a two-year contract extension with Yorkshire after the club was relegated from Division One of the County Championship.

=== Yorkshire captain and release ===
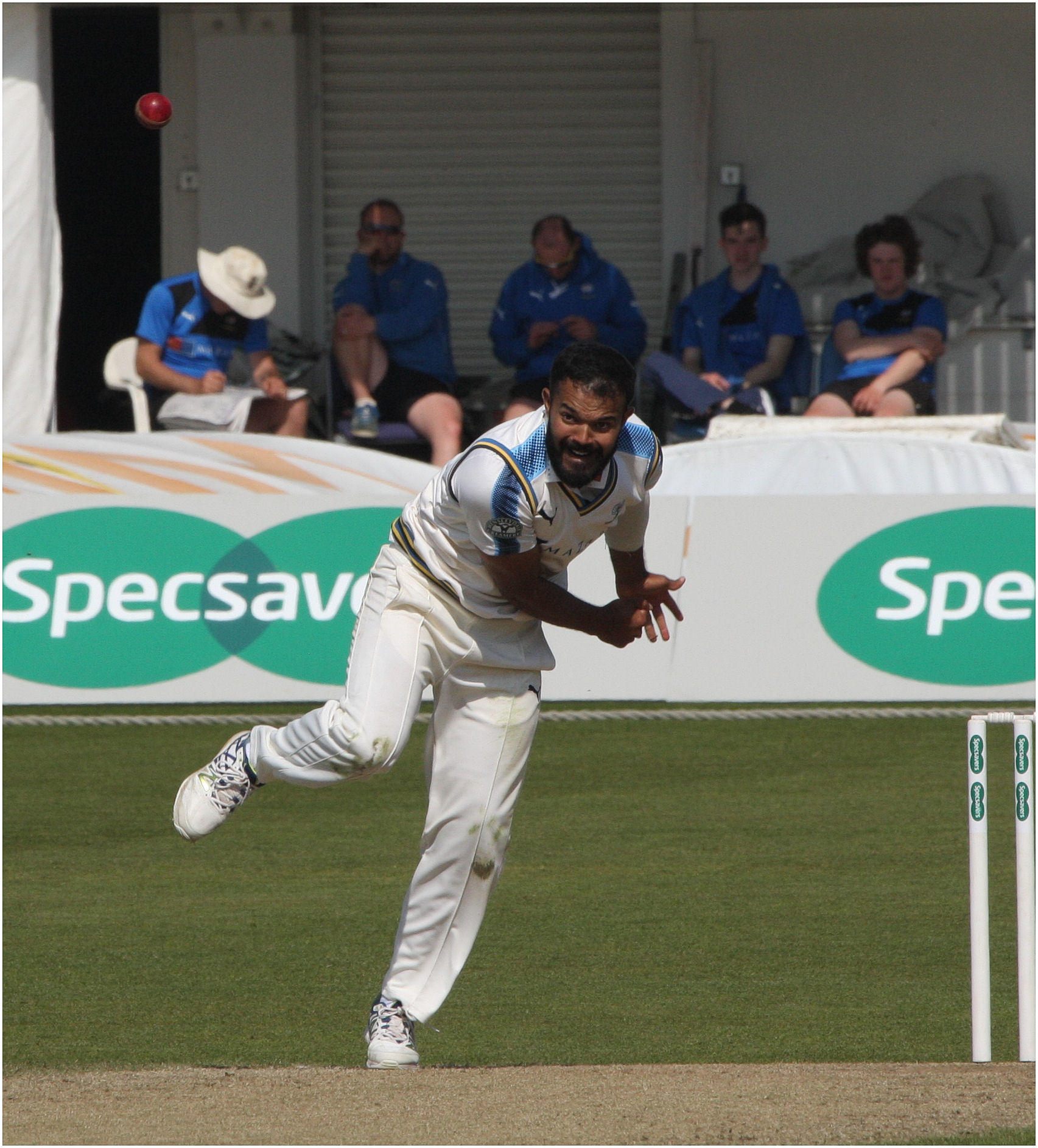
Rafiq bowling for Yorkshire in a County Championship match in 2017.

Following the dropping of fellow spin bowler Adil Rashid, Rafiq came back into Yorkshire's County Championship team in 2012, the first time he had played in the county's Championship team since 2010. In June, he captained Yorkshire in six matches in the 2012 Twenty20 Cup when Andrew Gale was injured, becoming the youngest captain in the county's history and the first player of Asian origin to captain the Yorkshire team. The team won five of the six matches he was captain for and Yorkshire reached the final of the competition, losing to Hampshire with Gale back in the team as captain; Rafiq took one wicket in the final.

Towards the end of the 2012 season, Rafiq was instrumental in Yorkshire's promotion back to Division One of the County Championship. He played in ten of the county's 16 Championship matches during the season and took 26 wickets. He took three wickets and scored important runs in a victory over Gloucestershire in a rain-affected match at Scarborough at the end of August, and against Essex in September scored two half-centuries and took eight wickets in the match, including a five-wicket haul, to help guarantee Yorkshire's promotion. Journalist George Dobell was impressed with Rafiq's "grit and determination" while batting in the first innings and with his bowling skill throughout the match. Rafiq's five-wicket haul was the first of his senior career and his match figures of 8/115 were his best in first-class cricket. Dobell wrote that he considered that Rafiq had a chance of playing for England at some point and that "he has a golden future".

The following season, Rafiq captained the team again in Twenty20 matches in Gale's absence and took a five-wicket haul in a one-day match against the touring Bangladesh A team. He spent time with England development squads, but a knee injury caused him problems, and he played rarely for Yorkshire other than in Twenty20 matches. Despite his role in the Twenty20 team, the lack of regular cricket throughout the season led to him choosing to leave the county at the end of the 2014 season, aged 23 and with his bowling action breaking down. Speaking in 2017, he said that he had "lost a lot of confidence in my body and confidence in myself as a person" and did not play professional cricket for almost two years.

=== Return to Yorkshire and second release ===
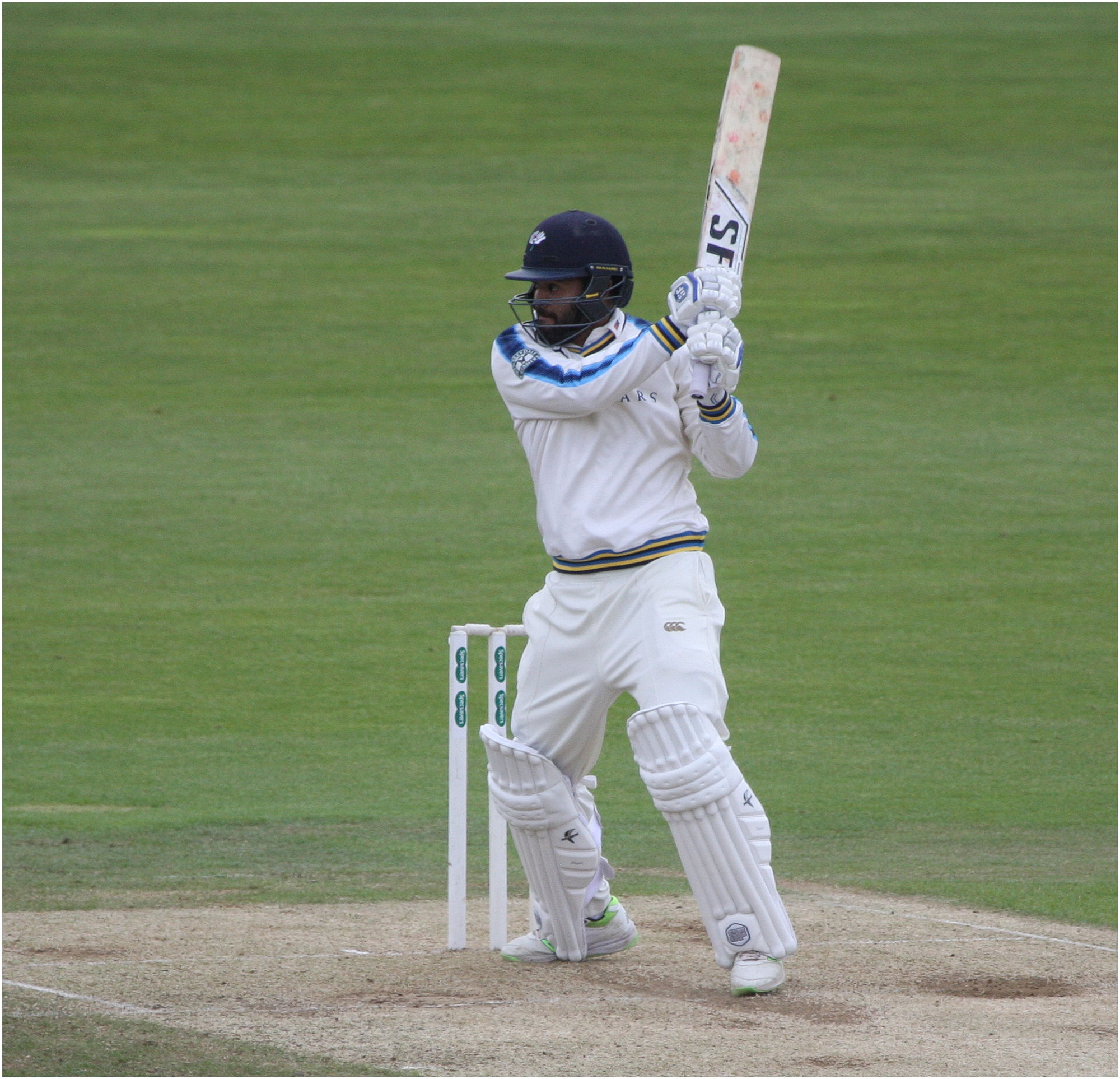
Azeem Rafiq batting for Yorkshire in 2017.

Rafiq came close to signing for Derbyshire at the start of the 2015 season, but the issues with his bowling action continued to cause problems. After playing club cricket for Barnsley and coaching in Dubai during the English winter, Rafiq bowled at the new Yorkshire coach (his old captain, Andrew Gale) in a net session in 2016. He impressed Gale and was asked to play a Second XI match; he was back in the county's First XI the following week, being named player of the match in the team's first win in the 2016 T20 Blast. He took 24 wickets during the season, 15 of them in the t20Blast, and was awarded his county cap.

He continued to play for the county in 2017, taking a five-wicket haul in a Twenty20 match for the first time in August, playing in all competitions and was the county's leading wicket-taker in the One-Day Cup. The following year, however, he played only in Twenty20 matches and was released by Yorkshire at the end of the season, with the club citing a limited budget. He spent some time playing in Pakistan in 2018, including making a single first-class appearance for Sui Southern Gas Company in the Quaid-e-Azam Trophy, before playing minor counties cricket for Lincolnshire County Cricket Club in 2019.

== Personal life ==
Rafiq is married and he and his wife have a son and a daughter. Their first child was stillborn in 2018 after his wife had endured a difficult pregnancy, and shortly afterwards Rafiq was released by Yorkshire; he has spoken of the impact of his release, the way he was treated at the club and the stillbirth had on his mental health and that he considered suicide. After the stillbirth the couple spent some time in Pakistan, with Rafiq on compassionate leave from Yorkshire. It was at this time that he first made Yorkshire aware of alleged incidents of racism at the club.

During the COVID-19 pandemic lockdown in 2020, Rafiq and his sister began to provide food for National Health Service and other key workers in Barnsley and to raise money for the local hospice. This led to the siblings setting up a tea-shop business based out of the shipping container. He opened a fish and chip shop in Barnsley in 2021 and has continued to gain qualifications to coach cricket since leaving the professional game.

== Racism at Yorkshire ==
In 2020, in an interview with Taha Hashim of Wisden, Rafiq revealed how he experienced racism, harassment and bullying during his time playing for Yorkshire. The interview was initially about his work during the COVID-19 pandemic and his new business, but when Hashim asked about his early career Rafiq opened up about the racism he had encountered at the club. He spoke about having an "openly racist" captain at one point and how on one occasion a senior player had commented on the number of Asian players at the club, suggesting that "we need to have a word about that".

In further interviews with CricInfo, the BBC and the Cricket Badger podcast, (Note: The Cricket Badger podcast interviewed Rafiq in late August 2020. The podcast is run by journalist James Buttler who was Yorkshire County Cricket Club's press officer between 2007 and 2010. Cricinfo and the BBC both interviewed Rafiq in early September.) he described how he believed he had been made to feel like an "outsider" and outlined instances where he believed that the club was institutionally racist in its approach. He described how he had initially tried to fit in with the culture within the club and had done things that "as a Muslim, I now look back on and regret", and went on to describe specific instances of racist behaviour and that he had first reported his concerns about behaviour by people in the club in 2017 but felt that he had been ignored. These included instances of behaviour by spectators at matches towards Asian players.

Rafiq had first raised concerns about incidents of racism in Yorkshire in August 2018 following the stillbirth of his first child. It has been reported that his concerns were dismissed as "vague" by Yorkshire's Chief Executive Officer Mark Arthur, and that the club failed to adequately investigate the issues at this point, apparently believing that Rafiq did not wish to pursue the issue.

=== Investigations and legal action ===
Yorkshire contacted Rafiq in early September 2020 to discuss the allegations, and announced that they would be setting up a "formal investigation" into his claims as well as a "wider review" of its "policies and culture". Global law firm Squire Patton Boggs was asked by Yorkshire chairman Roger Hutton, who had been appointed earlier in 2020, (Note: Hutton was not in a formal role with Yorkshire during the time Rafiq played for the club, although his legal firm was the chief sponsor of Yorkshire Diamonds, a women's team partnered with Yorkshire, in 2016.) to conduct the investigation; at the same time, an independent panel chaired by Samir Pathak was set up to review the investigation's findings. Tom Harrison, the chief executive officer of the England and Wales Cricket Board (ECB), first spoke to Rafiq during the same month.

Rafiq made written and verbal statements to the inquiry in November, saying that he hoped to bring about "meaningful change" at the club. These expanded on his initial allegations and made reference to specific instances of racist language being used, both by employees of Yorkshire and by supporters, of a culture which isolated Muslim players at the club and of a lack of development support for younger Asian players.

The following month, Rafiq began an employment tribunal claim against the club, again expressing the hope that the claim would help bring about change within cricket. The tribunal took place in June 2021 and failed to resolve, with Rafiq refusing to accept what has been reported as "a six-figure sum" which was dependent on him signing a non-disclosure agreement which would have restricted his ability to speak about the case.

=== Squire Patton Boggs report ===
Yorkshire received the report of the investigation from Squire Patton Boggs in August 2021 and was asked by the ECB to provide a copy. On 19 August the club released a statement saying that the report had found that Rafiq had been "the victim of inappropriate behaviour". They offered their "profound apologies" but said that "legal restraints" meant that they would not be able to publish the full report. Earlier in the year Rafiq had criticised the investigation process, claiming that it was "flawed" and that several key witnesses had not been asked to contribute their evidence.

Rafiq criticised the statement made by Yorkshire, stating in an interview with the BBC Asian Network that he believed that it downplayed racism by labelling it as "inappropriate behaviour". At the beginning of September MPs on the House of Commons Digital, Culture, Media and Sport Select Committee called for the immediate release of the report. On 10 September the club released a summary of the report which confirmed that the independent panel had found that seven of the 43 allegations that it investigated (Note: Rafiq has questioned the number of allegations which were investigated, stating that he did not enumerate his evidence.) had been upheld, with the bulk of the other allegations not upheld due to "insufficient evidence". (Note: The report had interviewed 26 witnesses but that "many individuals" had refused the opportunity to contribute to it.) The BBC reported that Roger Hutton had stated that the report had concluded there was "insufficient evidence to conclude that Yorkshire County Cricket Club is institutionally racist".

The findings of the report which had been upheld included instances of racist language being used by players at the club before 2010 and that a former coach at the club had "regularly used racist language" before 2012. It included several recommendations, including a review of club policies and of "better engagement" with local minority communities. The club's statement did not name the individuals who had used racist language and Yorkshire did not initially provide a copy of the report to Rafiq. After a court ordered that the report be released to Rafiq, a "heavily redacted" copy was received on 13 October; the ECB, which had also asked for a copy of the report, had not received it. On 28 October, Yorkshire announced that they would not be taking disciplinary action against any member of staff or executive over the report's findings.

=== Reactions to the report findings ===
Rafiq responded to the announcement that Yorkshire would not be disciplining anyone at the club, by accusing the club of being more interested in protecting its reputation rather than addressing allegations of racism. A statement issued on his behalf questioned the decision not to discipline anyone, claiming that it was "inconceivable" that there was no one still at the club who had been involved in the events investigated. The ECB released a statement saying that it would be investigating findings of the report, although it anticipated that this would take some time to do so; Yorkshire, citing the continuing employment tribunal case, did not release the full report.

=== Impacts of the case ===
Yorkshire did not take disciplinary action against any of its staff or players. The club has been criticised for its response, with a number of its sponsors withdrawing their financial support, and on 4 November 2021, the ECB suspended the club from hosting international matches. (Note: In 2019 Yorkshire earned £10.4 million, more than half of its total income, as a result of hosting international matches.) In the wake of increasing criticism, Yorkshire chairman Roger Hutton resigned in early November 2021; this was followed by the resignation of chief executive officer Mark Arthur, whom Rafiq had been critical of, on 11 November.

=== Allegations against Rafiq ===
Following Rafiq's evidence in front of the Digital, Culture, Media and Sport Select Committee in November 2021, it emerged that Rafiq had used anti-Semitic language in Facebook messages with another cricketer in 2011 when he was 19. Rafiq issued an unreserved apology for the messages, saying that he was "ashamed" and "a different person today." At the same time, a woman released text and WhatsApp messages that Rafiq had sent to her in 2015 to The Yorkshire Post newspaper. The woman, who had been 16 at the time, described the texts as "creepy" and criticised Rafiq for his treatment of women.
