= Russell Evans (cricketer) =

English cricketer and umpire

Personal information
- Full name: Russell John Evans
- Born: 1 October 1965; Calverton, Nottinghamshire, England
- Died: 30 November 2017 (aged 52); Long Eaton, Derbyshire, England
- Batting: Right-handed
- Bowling: Right-arm medium
- Role: Umpire
- Relatives: Kevin Evans (brother)

Domestic team information
- Years: Team
- 1994–1996: Minor Counties
- 1993–1997: Lincolnshire
- 1985–1990: Nottinghamshire

Umpiring information
- WODIs umpired: 1 (2011)
- WT20Is umpired: 1 (2011)

Career statistics
Competition	First-class	List A
Matches	7	16
Runs scored	201	211
Batting average	25.12	16.23
100s/50s	–/2	–/1
Top score	59	56
Balls bowled	198	–
Wickets	3	–
Bowling average	32.33	–
5 wickets in innings	–	–
10 wickets in match	–	–
Best bowling	3/40	–
Catches/stumpings	5/–	1/–
- Source: Cricinfo, 3 August 2011

Russell John Evans (1 October 1965 – 30 November 2017) was an English cricketer and umpire. Evans was a right-handed batsman who bowled right-arm medium pace. He was born in Calverton, Nottinghamshire.

Evans made his List A debut for Nottinghamshire against Hampshire in the 1985 John Player Special League. He made 4 further List A appearances for Nottinghamshire, the last of which came against Yorkshire in the 1988 Refuge Assurance League. In his 6 List A matches for the county, he scored 55 runs at an average of 13.75, with a high score of 20. He made his first-class debut for Nottinghamshire against the touring Pakistanis in 1987. He made 5 further first-class appearances for Nottinghamshire, the last of which came against Cambridge University. In his 6 first-class matches for the county, he scored 112 runs at an average of 18.66, with a high score of 50 not out. This score, his only fifty for Nottinghamshire, came against the touring Sri Lankans in 1988. With the ball, he took 3 wickets at a bowling average of 32.33, with best figures of 3/40. With opportunities limited at Nottinghamshire, he left the county at the end of the 1990 season.

He later joined Lincolnshire, making his debut against Northumberland in the 1993 MCCA Knockout Trophy. He played Minor counties cricket from 1993 to 1997, making 33 Minor Counties Championship appearances and 10 MCCA Knockout Trophy appearances. He played his first List A match for the county against Glamorgan in the 1994 NatWest Trophy. He made 2 further List A appearances for Lincolnshire, against Gloucestershire in the 1996 NatWest Trophy and Derbyshire in the 1997 NatWest Trophy. While playing for Lincolnshire he appeared in a single first-class match for the Minor Counties against the touring South Africans. He opened the batting in this match, scoring 59 runs in the Minor Counties first-innings before being dismissed by Richard Snell. In the second-innings he was run out for 30 runs. He also played List A cricket for the Minor Counties, making his debut in the limited-overs format for the team against Lancashire in the 1995 Benson & Hedges Cup. He made 6 further List A appearances for the team, the last of which came against Durham in the 1996 Benson & Hedges Cup. He scored 135 runs in his 7 matches for the team, which came at an average of 22.50, with a high score of 56. This score came against Durham in the 1995 Benson & Hedges Cup.

From 2011 he stood as an umpire in first-class matches, as well as Women's One Day Internationals and Women's Twenty20 Internationals. In 2011, he was added to the England and Wales Cricket Board list of reserve umpires, alongside Billy Taylor and Alex Wharf, and was promoted to the full list in 2014, standing in matches to the end of the 2017 season. His brother, Kevin, also played for Nottinghamshire, as well as representing Shropshire.

Evans died suddenly at the age of 52 after developing complications while undergoing a routine medical procedure.
