= Saikat Ali (cricketer, born 1991) =

Bangladeshi cricketer (born 1991)

Mohammad Saikat Ali (born 23 October 1991 in Manikganj, Dhaka Division), known as Saikat Ali, is a Bangladeshi first-class, List A and Twenty20 cricketer since the 2008–09 Bangladeshi cricket season. Saikat is a right-handed batsman and a right arm medium pace bowler. He is currently (July 2016) playing for Dhaka Metropolis. Early in his career, he was playing for the Bangladesh national under-19 cricket team.

Saikat Ali, a right-hand batsman who bowls medium-pace, was in the Bangladesh squads for the 2008 and 2010 Under-19 World Cups. He scored a fifty as an opener in a one-dayer against England U-19 in November 2009 and also took 3–11 against the same team in another one-dayer. Saikat's favourite cricketer is Jacques Kallis whom he admires for his all-round skills.

== Career statistics ==
=== Career averages ===
	Mat	Inns	NO	Runs	HS	Avg	BF	SR	100s	50s	0s	4s	6s
Overview	5	9	0	301	58	33.44	627	48.00	0	1	0	41	3

=== Vs team ===
	Mat	Inns	NO	Runs	HS	Avg	BF	SR	100s	50s	0s	4s	6s
Vs England U19	3	6	0	222	58	37.00	472	47.03	0	1	0	29	3
Vs SL Under-19s	2	3	0	79	44	26.33	155	50.96	0	0	0	12	0

=== In host country ===
	Mat	Inns	NO	Runs	HS	Avg	BF	SR	100s	50s	0s	4s	6s
In Bangladesh	3	5	0	153	45	30.60	368	41.57	0	0	0	19	2
In England	2	4	0	148	58	37.00	259	57.14	0	1	0	22	1

=== In continent ===
	Mat	Inns	NO	Runs	HS	Avg	BF	SR	100s	50s	0s	4s	6s
In Asia	3	5	0	153	45	30.60	368	41.57	0	0	0	19	2
In Europe	2	4	0	148	58	37.00	259	57.14	0	1	0	22	1

=== Home Vs away ===
	Mat	Inns	NO	Runs	HS	Avg	BF	SR	100s	50s	0s	4s	6s
Home	3	5	0	153	45	30.60	368	41.57	0	0	0	19	2
Away	2	4	0	148	58	37.00	259	57.14	0	1	0	22	1

=== By year ===
	Mat	Inns	NO	Runs	HS	Avg	BF	SR	100s	50s	0s	4s	6s
Year 2009	5	9	0	301	58	33.44	627	48.00	0	1	0	41	3

=== By season ===
	Mat	Inns	NO	Runs	HS	Avg	BF	SR	100s	50s	0s	4s	6s
Season 2009	4	7	0	227	58	32.42	414	54.83	0	1	0	34	1
Season 2009/10	1	2	0	74	45	37.00	213	34.74	0	0	0	7	2

=== Captains involved ===
	Mat	Inns	NO	Runs	HS	Avg	BF	SR	100s	50s	0s	4s	6s
*Mahmudul Hasan	5	9	0	301	58	33.44	627	48.00	0	1	0	41	3

=== Is captain / is not captain ===
	Mat	Inns	NO	Runs	HS	Avg	BF	SR	100s	50s	0s	4s	6s
Is Not Captain	5	9	0	301	58	33.44	627	48.00	0	1	0	41	3

=== Is keeper / is not keeper ===
	Mat	Inns	NO	Runs	HS	Avg	BF	SR	100s	50s	0s	4s	6s
Is Not Keeper	5	9	0	301	58	33.44	627	48.00	0	1	0	41	3

=== Toss ===
	Mat	Inns	NO	Runs	HS	Avg	BF	SR	100s	50s	0s	4s	6s
Won The Toss	3	5	0	136	45	27.20	263	51.71	0	0	0	20	1
Lost The Toss	2	4	0	165	58	41.25	364	45.32	0	1	0	21	2

=== Toss and batting sequence ===
	Mat	Inns	NO	Runs	HS	Avg	BF	SR	100s	50s	0s	4s	6s
Won Toss & Batted	1	2	0	78	44	39.00	148	52.70	0	0	0	12	0
Won Toss & Fielded	2	3	0	58	45	19.33	115	50.43	0	0	0	8	1
Lost Toss & Fielded	2	4	0	165	58	41.25	364	45.32	0	1	0	21	2

=== Batting first vs fielding first ===
	Mat	Inns	NO	Runs	HS	Avg	BF	SR	100s	50s	0s	4s	6s
Matches Batting First	1	2	0	78	44	39.00	148	52.70	0	0	0	12	0
Matches Fielding First	4	7	0	223	58	31.85	479	46.55	0	1	0	29	3

=== In team innings ===
	Mat	Inns	NO	Runs	HS	Avg	BF	SR	100s	50s	0s	4s	6s
1st Team Innings	5	5	0	158	45	31.60	394	40.10	0	0	0	17	3
2nd Team Innings	4	4	0	143	58	35.75	233	61.37	0	1	0	24	0

=== In match innings ===
	Mat	Inns	NO	Runs	HS	Avg	BF	SR	100s	50s	0s	4s	6s
1st Match Innings	1	1	0	34	34	34.00	80	42.50	0	0	0	5	0
2nd Match Innings	4	4	0	124	45	31.00	314	39.49	0	0	0	12	3
3rd Match Innings	2	2	0	102	58	51.00	155	65.80	0	1	0	17	0
4th Match Innings	2	2	0	41	29	20.50	78	52.56	0	0	0	7	0

=== Match result ===
	Mat	Inns	NO	Runs	HS	Avg	BF	SR	100s	50s	0s	4s	6s
Won Match	1	2	0	74	45	37.00	213	34.74	0	0	0	7	2
Lost Match	1	2	0	91	58	45.50	151	60.26	0	1	0	14	0
Drawn Match	3	5	0	136	45	27.20	263	51.71	0	0	0	20	1

=== Result and batting sequence ===
	Mat	Inns	NO	Runs	HS	Avg	BF	SR	100s	50s	0s	4s	6s
Won Fielding First	1	2	0	74	45	37.00	213	34.74	0	0	0	7	2
Lost Fielding First	1	2	0	91	58	45.50	151	60.26	0	1	0	14	0
Drawn Batting First	1	2	0	78	44	39.00	148	52.70	0	0	0	12	0
Drawn Fielding First	2	3	0	58	45	19.33	115	50.43	0	0	0	8	1

=== In tournament type ===
	Mat	Inns	NO	Runs	HS	Avg	BF	SR	100s	50s	0s	4s	6s
2 Team Series	5	9	0	301	58	33.44	627	48.00	0	1	0	41	3

=== In match number per series ===
	Mat	Inns	NO	Runs	HS	Avg	BF	SR	100s	50s	0s	4s	6s
Only Match In Series	1	2	0	74	45	37.00	213	34.74	0	0	0	7	2
1st Match In Series	2	4	0	169	58	42.25	299	56.52	0	1	0	26	0
2nd Match In Series	2	3	0	58	45	19.33	115	50.43	0	0	0	8	1

=== In batting position ===
	Mat	Inns	NO	Runs	HS	Avg	BF	SR	100s	50s	0s	4s	6s
1st Position	2	2	0	46	45	23.00	83	55.42	0	0	0	6	1
2nd Position	3	5	0	177	58	35.40	396	44.69	0	1	0	23	2
3rd Position	1	2	0	78	44	39.00	148	52.70	0	0	0	12	0
