= 2019 European Cricket League =

Cricket tournament

- Dates: 29 – 31 July 2019
- Administrator: European Cricket Network
- Cricket format: T10
- Tournament format(s): Group stage and knock-out
- Host: Spain
- Champions: VOC Rotterdam (1st title)
- Runners-up: SG Findorff
- Participants: 8
- Matches: 17
- Player of the series: (Netherlands) Max O'Dowd
- Most runs: (Netherlands) Scott Edwards (233)
- Most wickets: (Spain) Syed Sherazi (9)
- Official website: European Cricket Network

The 2019 European Cricket League (abbreviated as ECL19) was the inaugural edition of the European Cricket League. It was held in July 2019 and featured eight European champion club teams. At ECL19, the domestic club champions of Denmark, France, Germany, Italy, the Netherlands, Romania, Russia and Spain competed for the chance to become club cricket's European champions. Players from 18 European nations as well as from more traditional cricket-playing nations took part. The league has adopted the T10 format and was played over three days. The La Manga Club in Cartagena, Murcia, Spain hosted the tournament, which was staged from 29 to 31 July 2019.

== Tournament Play / Broadcast at ECL19 ==
Packing 17 matches into a T10 format over three days, every match was televised live in Europe, Asia, North America and Australasia across a combination of broadcast, digital and social channels, including the newly-launched European Cricket Network. Over 100 countries worldwide broadcast coverage including the UK, Australia, India, Middle East, UAE, France, Germany, Turkey, Spain, United States, Canada and the Caribbean. Teams were split into two groups of four with matches being played on a round-robin basis in La Manga with the top two from each progressing to contest the semi-finals and final.

The current ECL title holders are V.O.C Rotterdam of the Netherlands, who won the inaugural 2019 season, beating SG Findorff (Bremen) from Germany in the final.

== Participating teams ==
Location of 2019 ECL teams

Eight clubs from across Europe participated in the inaugural edition.

1. (Denmark) Svanholm Cricket Club, Brøndby
2. (France) Dreux Cricket Club, Dreux
3. (Germany) Sportgemeinschaft Findorff, Bremen
4. (Italy) Janjua Cricket Club, Brescia
5. (Netherlands) Volharding Olympia Combinatie, Rotterdam
6. (Romania) Cluj Cricket Club, Cluj-Napoca
7. (Russia) St. Petersburg Lions, Saint Petersburg
8. (Spain) Catalunya Cricket Club, Girona

== Group stage ==
=== Group A ===
Pos	Team	Pld	W	L	Pts	NRR	Qualification
1	(Netherlands) V.O.C. Rotterdam	3	3	0	6	3.450	Advanced to semi-finals
2	(Denmark) Svanholm Cricket Club	3	2	1	4	1.740	Advanced to semi-finals
3	(France) Dreux Cricket Club	3	1	2	2	1.170	Advanced to 5th place playoff
4	(Romania) Cluj Cricket Club	3	0	3	0	−6.060	Advanced to 7th place playoff

Source: European Cricket Network

=== Fixtures ===
29 July 2019
08:00
Scorecard

Dreux Cricket Club (France); 98/7 (10 overs)	v	(Netherlands) V.O.C. Rotterdam; 99/2 (7.4 overs)
Muhammad Bhatti 37* (23); Pierce Fletcher 2/19 (2 overs)		Max O'Dowd 53 (22); Mohammad Shahzeb 1/8 (0.4 overs)

V.O.C. Rotterdam won by 8 wickets
La Manga Club, Murcia
Umpires: Lars Anderson and Muhammad Adnan

- V.O.C. Rotterdam won the toss and elected to bowl.

29 July 2019
12:00
Scorecard

Dreux Cricket Club (France); 60/9 (10 overs)	v	(Denmark) Svanholm Cricket Club; 63/1 (6.3 overs)
Mohammad Shahzeb 14* (13); Zeeshan Khan 3/10 (2 overs)		Zishan Shah 35* (23); Yaseen Afridi 1/21 (2 overs)

Svanholm Cricket Club won by 9 wickets
La Manga Club, Murcia
Umpires: Andrew Begg and Muhammad Adnan

- Dreux CC won the toss and elected to bat.

29 July 2019
16:00
Scorecard

Cluj Cricket Club (Romania); 87/5 (10 overs)	v	(Netherlands) V.O.C. Rotterdam; 88/2 (5.3 overs)
Taranjeet Singh 42 (26); Max O'Dowd 1/4 (1 over)		Pieter Seelaar 25* (11); Taranjeet Singh 2/24 (2 overs)

V.O.C. Rotterdam won by 8 wickets
La Manga Club, Murcia
Umpires: Shanaka Weerahennedige and Lars Anderson

- V.O.C. Rotterdam won the toss and elected to bowl.

30 July 2019
08:00
Scorecard

Dreux Cricket Club (France); 164/6 (10 overs)	v	(Romania) Cluj Cricket Club; 69/5 (10 overs)
Ahmad Nabi 105 (30); Muhammad Ahmed 2/11 (1 over)		Satwik Nadigotla 27* (25); Wahid Abdul 3/9 (2 overs)

Dreux Cricket Club won by 95 runs
La Manga Club, Murcia
Umpires: Shanaka Weerahennedige and Andrew Schou

- Cluj CC won the toss and elected to bowl.

30 July 2019
12:00
Scorecard

Cluj Cricket Club (Romania); 75/7 (10 overs)	v	(Denmark) Svanholm Cricket Club; 76/0 (8.2 overs)
Taranjeet Singh 35 (18); Zeeshan Khan 2/10 (2 overs)		Zishan Shah 53* (34)

Svanholm Cricket Club won by 10 wickets
La Manga Club, Murcia
Umpires: Martin Hancock and Andrew Schou

- Svanholm CC won the toss and elected to bowl.

30 July 2019
18:00
Scorecard

V.O.C. Rotterdam (Netherlands); 133/7 (10 overs)	v	(Denmark) Svanholm Cricket Club; 126/8 (10 overs)
Corey Rutgers 29* (7); Zeeshan Khan 2/36 (2 overs)		Mads Henriksen 53* (21); Pierce Fletcher 2/14 (2 overs)

V.O.C. Rotterdam won by 7 runs
La Manga Club, Murcia
Umpires: Andrew Schou and Muhammad Adnan

- Svanholm CC won the toss and elected to bowl.

=== Group B ===
Pos	Team	Pld	W	L	Pts	NRR	Qualification
1	(Germany) SG Findorff	3	3	0	6	0.690	Advanced to semi-finals
2	(Spain) Catalunya Cricket Club	3	2	1	4	1.060	Advanced to semi-finals
3	(Russia) St. Petersburg Lions	3	1	2	2	−4.790	Advanced to 5th place playoff
4	(Italy) JCC Brescia†	3	0	3	0	3.570	Advanced to 7th place playoff

Source: European Cricket Network

† Lost all points due to player eligibility infringement.

29 July 2019
10:00
Scorecard

Catalunya Cricket Club (Spain); 128/5 (10 overs)	v	(Russia) St. Petersburg Lions; 62/7 (10 overs)
Muhammad Mughal 76 (27); Vijay Gautam 3/12 (2 overs)		Rinku Singh 24 (20); Syed Sherazi 3/5 (2 overs)

Catalunya Cricket Club won by 66 runs
La Manga Club, Murcia
Umpires: Martin Hancock and Waseem Dar

- Catalunya CC won the toss and elected to bat.

29 July 2019
14:00
Scorecard

Catalunya Cricket Club (Spain); 118/2 (10 overs)	v	(Italy) JCC Brescia; 120/4 (8.3 overs)
Muhammad Khan 63* (32); Muhammad Iqbal 1/21 (2 overs)		Muhammad Jafri 38 (15); Muhammad Mughal 2/19 (2 overs)

Catalunya Cricket Club declared winners†
La Manga Club, Murcia
Umpires: Andrew Schou and Martin Hancock

- Catalunya CC won the toss and elected to bat.

† JCC Brescia initially won all their matches, but were later found breaching the player eligibility criteria and thus their opponents were declared winners.

29 July 2019
18:00
Scorecard

SG Findorff (Germany); 97/5 (10 overs)	v	(Italy) JCC Brescia; 99/2 (5.5 overs)
Ahmed Wardak 37 (25); Zahid Cheema 1/17 (2 overs)		Muhammad Jafri 59 (17); Israr Khan 2/15 (2 overs)

SG Findorff declared winners†
La Manga Club, Murcia
Umpires: Andrew Begg and Waseem Dar

- JCC Brescia won the toss and elected to bowl.

† JCC Brescia initially won all their matches, but were later found breaching the player eligibility criteria and thus their opponents were declared winners.

30 July 2019
10:00
Scorecard

St. Petersburg Lions (Russia); 53/8 (10 overs)	v	(Germany) SG Findorff; 59/2 (6 overs)
Vijay Gautam 18 (23); Iftikhar Khan 2/12 (2 overs)		Israr Khan 25* (17); Lalit Lalit 1/14 (2 overs)

SG Findorff won by 8 wickets
La Manga Club, Murcia
Umpires: Muhammad Adnan and Waseem Dar

- St. Petersburg Lions won the toss and elected to bat.

30 July 2019
14:00
Scorecard

JCC Brescia (Italy); 116/7 (10 overs)	v	(Russia) St. Petersburg Lions; 91/6 (10 overs)
Muhammad Jafri 40 (15); Lalit Lalit 3/10 (2 overs)		Anil Singh 35 (13); Muhammad Iqbal 2/30 (2 overs)

St. Petersburg declared winners†
La Manga Club, Murcia
Umpires: Lars Anderson and Andrew Begg

- St. Petersburg Lions won the toss and elected to bowl.

† JCC Brescia initially won all their matches, but were later found breaching the player eligibility criteria and thus their opponents were declared winners.

30 July 2019
16:00
Scorecard

Catalunya Cricket Club (Spain); 115/7 (10 overs)	v	(Germany) SG Findorff; 116/4 (8.4 overs)
Rauf Zaman 41* (16); Iftikhar Khan 2/11 (2 overs)		Ammar Khalid 45* (15); Syed Sherazi 3/24 (2 overs)

SG Findorff won by 6 wickets
La Manga Club, Murcia
Umpires: Shanaka Weerahennedige and Martin Hancock

- SG Findorff won the toss and elected to bowl.

== Minor play-offs ==
=== 7th place playoff ===
31 July 2019
09:00
Scorecard

Cluj Cricket Club (Romania); 84/7 (10 overs)	v	(Italy) JCC Brescia; 86/4 (9.1 overs)
Vasu Saini 25 (14); Zain ul Abdeen 2/15 (2 overs)		Shahrukh Nawaz 25* (15); Gaurav Mishra 2/10 (2 overs)

JCC Brescia won by 6 wickets
La Manga Club, Murcia
Umpires: Andrew Schou and Martin Hancock

- Cluj CC won the toss and elected to bat.

=== 5th place playoff ===
31 July 2019
11:00
Scorecard

Dreux Cricket Club (France); 82/7 (10 overs)	v	(Russia) St. Petersburg Lions; 70/7 (10 overs)
Niaz Hamza 22 (16); Rinku Singh 2/18 (2 overs)		Anil Singh 34 (22); Muhammad Bhatti 3/4 (2 overs)

Dreux Cricket Club won by 12 runs
La Manga Club, Murcia
Umpires: Andrew Begg and Muhammad Adnan

- Dreux CC won the toss and elected to bat.

== Playoffs ==
=== Semi-finals ===
==== Semi-final 1 ====
31 July 2019
13:00
Scorecard

Catalunya Cricket Club (Spain); 129/5 (10 overs)	v	(Netherlands) V.O.C. Rotterdam; 133/1 (7.4 overs)
Yasir Ali 45 (15); Jelte Schoonheim 2/12 (1 over)		Scott Edwards 55 (15); Syed Sherazi 1/21 (2 overs)

V.O.C. Rotterdam won by 9 wickets
La Manga Club, Murcia
Umpires: Lars Anderson and Waseem Dar

- Catalunya CC won the toss and elected to bat.

==== 2nd Semi-final ====
31 July 2019
15:00
Scorecard

Svanholm Cricket Club (Denmark); 88/4 (10 overs)	v	(Germany) SG Findorff; 94/3 (8.5 overs)
Mads Henriksen 27 (11); Israr Khan 2/10 (2 overs)		Aziz Dawodzy 25 (13); Zeeshan Khan 1/10 (2 overs)

SG Findorff won by 7 wickets
La Manga Club, Murcia
Umpires: Martin Hancock and Shanaka Weerahennedige

- SG Findorff won the toss and elected to bowl.

=== Final ===
31 July 2019
17:00
Scorecard

V.O.C. Rotterdam (Netherlands); 222/0 (10 overs)	v	(Germany) SG Findorff; 121/9 (10 overs)
Scott Edwards 137* (39)		Farooq Amirie 45 (17); Dirk van Baren 3/8 (1 over)

V.O.C. Rotterdam won by 101 runs
La Manga Club, Murcia
Umpires: Lars Anderson and Waseem Dar

- SG Findorff won the toss and elected to bowl.

== Player of the Tournament ==
Max O'Dowd of V.O.C. Rotterdam was awarded “Player of the Tournament” at the 2019 European Cricket League. O’Dowd scored 219 runs in five innings (2 not outs) at an average of 73 and strike rate of 263.86, including an undefeated 74 in the final against SG Findorff. He also took four wickets in the tournament with his leg-break bowling with a best of 2-25 against Catalunya Cricket Club in the semi-final. O’Dowd is a current Netherlands international.

== Pavel Florin at ECL19 ==
The inaugural tournament gained significant worldwide prominence after the remarkable performances of Cluj all-rounder Pavel Florin during the group stages. Florin, a 40-year-old professional bodyguard and president of Cluj Cricket Club in Romania, caused a stir after his bowling performance went viral on social media. Many of the sport's most famous figures, including Australian legend Shane Warne, expressed their support and admiration of Florin because of his pure unaffected love for the game. Florin has since gone on to play in Australia where he again hit the headlines over the winter. Florin will take part in the second-staging of the European Cricket League - ECL20 - with Cluj Cricket Club, Romania.
