= Kent County Cricket Club in 2016 =

Kent County Cricket Club
2016 season
- Coach: (Cricket West Indies) Jimmy Adams
- Captain: (England) Sam Northeast
- Overseas players: (New Zealand) Tom Latham (May–July) (South Africa) Kagiso Rabada (June–July) (South Africa) Hardus Viljoen (August–September)
- Ground(s): St Lawrence Ground, Canterbury; Nevill Ground, Tunbridge Wells; County Ground, Beckenham
- County Championship: Runners-up, Division Two
- Royal London One-Day Cup: Quarter-finals
- NatWest t20 Blast: 7th, South Group
- Most runs: FC: SA Northeast (1,402); LA: JL Denly (428); T20: SA Northeast (462)
- Most wickets: FC: ME Claydon (50); LA: MT Coles (24); T20: DA Griffiths (13)
- Most catches: FC: JC Tredwell (14); LA: AJ Blake (8); T20: AJ Blake (8)
- Most wicket-keeping dismissals: FC: AP Rouse (31); LA: SW Billings (11); T20: SW Billings (7)

In 2016, Kent County Cricket Club competed in Division Two of the County Championship, the Royal London One-Day Cup and the NatWest t20 Blast. The season was the fifth, and last, in charge for head coach Jimmy Adams and the first for new club captain Sam Northeast, who took over from Rob Key at the end of the 2015 season, having captained the team on the field for much of the season.

Sam Billings continued to be selected for England limited overs squads, although he had to settle for only three appearances in 2016. On 21 February, he played in the second of two T20I matches at the end of the South Africa tour, scoring 5 runs in Johannesburg. Billings was selected in England's squad for the 2016 World Twenty20 in India, but did not play during the tournament other than as a substitute fielder. On 5 July, he featured in the only T20I during Sri Lanka's tour of England. Billings played a single ODI, the final match of three during England's tour of Bangladesh, on 12 October at Chittagong, opening the batting with a useful 62 in a four wicket win.

Sam Northeast won the club's Player of the Year award, having scored over 2,000 runs across all formats for a second successive season.

== Squad ==
=== Departures ===
In October 2015, Kent Cricket Academy graduate and England Under-19 wicket-keeper Ryan Davies left the club, signing for Somerset in search of more regular first XI cricket. All-rounder Ben Harmison was released in February after four seasons with Kent. On 18 April 2016, former captain Rob Key announced his retirement from playing. Key had spent his entire career with Kent and captained the team for nine years over two spells. He also represented England at international level, and scored a total of 19,419 first-class runs since his debut in 1998.

Following the end of the season, fast bowlers David Griffiths and Sam Weller were released by Kent, neither having their contracts renewed, whilst 40-year old all-rounder Darren Stevens signed a new one-year contract to extend his time at the county. In October head coach Jimmy Adams also left the county to return to his native Jamaica. After his loan spell, Will Gidman signed a permanent contract with Kent in October 2016 having been released by Nottinghamshire.

=== Arrivals ===
Former Hampshire and Gloucestershire wicket-keeper Adam Rouse signed for Kent in January on a two-year contract. Rouse had previously played for Kent's Second XI in 2014, and returned for a trial in April 2015 as cover for Sam Billings. Billings missed almost the first two months of the season due to being drafted by the Delhi Daredevils franchise for the 2016 Indian Premier League season.

In February, Kent announced the signing of two overseas players. First the club announced that South African fast bowler Kagiso Rabada would have a spell with Kent from late June until the end of July, between international commitments. The young bowler impressed during England's tour of South Africa, which had recently concluded. A few days later, the club announced the signing of New Zealand international batsman Tom Latham to play in all three competitions during the season. Latham's last match before joining up with his national team for a tour of Zimbabwe was a T20 fixture against Gloucestershire on 8 July. In 2015, the squad had not featured anyone classified as an overseas player.

After Rouse suffered a hand injury in June, and Billings was called into the England T20 squad, former Sussex wicket-keeper Callum Jackson was signed in early July. Kent would otherwise have been without a wicket-keeper in their County Championship match against Essex at the beginning of the month. Jackson had played as a substitute wicket-keeper during the Championship match at Glamorgan in June following Rouse's injury.

In late July, Kent announced the signing of Will Gidman from Nottinghamshire on a one-month loan deal. The former Gloucestershire all-rounder had recently returned from injury and would be available for four One-Day Cup games and two County Championship matches. Captain Sam Northeast stated that Gidman's signing would bolster the team's resources with Calum Haggett and Fabian Cowdrey unavailable through injury. Having impressed during this spell, Gidman's loan deal was extended for the remaining three matches of the season.

On 19 August, Kent announced the signing of South Africa international fast-bowler Hardus Viljoen as the overseas player for the final four County Championship matches of the season, with the club citing a number of injuries to bowlers over the course the season as the reason for the signing.

=== Squad list ===
- Ages given as of the first day of the 2016 County Championship season, 10 April 2016.

No.	Name	Nationality	Birth date	Batting style	Bowling style	Notes
Batsmen
4	Rob Key	England	12 May 1979 (aged 36)	Right-handed	Right arm off break	Retired 18 April 2016
6	Joe Denly	England	16 March 1986 (aged 30)	Right-handed	Right arm leg break	
10	Alex Blake	England	25 January 1989 (aged 27)	Left-handed	Right arm medium-fast	
16	Zak Crawley	England	3 February 1998 (aged 18)	Right-handed	Right arm medium	
17	Sam Northeast	England	16 October 1989 (aged 26)	Right-handed	Right arm off break	Club captain
23	Daniel Bell-Drummond	England	3 August 1993 (aged 22)	Right-handed	Right arm medium	
48	Tom Latham	New Zealand	2 April 1992 (aged 24)	Left-handed	Right arm medium	Overseas signing Left in mid-July to join the New Zealand team in Zimbabwe.
58	Sean Dickson	South Africa	2 September 1991 (aged 24)	Right-handed	Right arm medium	British passport holder
All-rounders
3	Darren Stevens	England	30 April 1976 (aged 39)	Right-handed	Right arm medium	
24	Adam Ball	England	1 March 1993 (aged 23)	Right-handed	Left arm fast-medium	
25	Calum Haggett	England	30 October 1990 (aged 25)	Left-handed	Right arm medium-fast	
26	Matt Coles	England	26 May 1990 (aged 25)	Left-handed	Right arm fast-medium	
30	Fabian Cowdrey	England	30 January 1993 (aged 23)	Right-handed	Slow left-arm orthodox	
42	Will Gidman	England	14 February 1985 (aged 31)	Left-handed	Right arm medium	On loan from Nottinghamshire (23 July to the end of the season)
Wicket-keepers
7	Sam Billings	England	15 June 1991 (aged 24)	Right-handed	—	
12	Adam Rouse	England	30 June 1992 (aged 23)	Right-handed	—	
21	Callum Jackson	England	7 September 1994 (aged 21)	Right-handed	—	
Bowlers
5	Ivan Thomas	England	25 September 1991 (aged 24)	Right-handed	Right arm medium-fast	
8	Mitchell Claydon	England	25 November 1982 (aged 33)	Left-handed	Right arm medium-fast	
11	Imran Qayyum	England	23 May 1993 (aged 22)	Right-handed	Slow left-arm orthodox	
14	Matt Hunn	England	22 March 1994 (aged 22)	Right-handed	Right arm fast-medium	
15	James Tredwell	England	27 February 1982 (aged 34)	Left-handed	Right arm off break	
18	David Griffiths	England	10 November 1985 (aged 30)	Left-handed	Right arm fast-medium	
19	Sam Weller	England	21 November 1994 (aged 21)	Right-handed	Right arm fast-medium	
22	Charlie Hartley	England	4 January 1994 (aged 22)	Right-handed	Right arm medium-fast	
27	Hugh Bernard	England	14 September 1996 (aged 19)	Right-handed	Right arm medium-fast	
33	Adam Riley	England	23 March 1992 (aged 24)	Right-handed	Right arm off break	
52	Kagiso Rabada	South Africa	25 May 1995 (aged 20)	Left-handed	Right arm fast	Overseas signing (June–July)
77	Hardus Viljoen	South Africa	6 March 1989 (aged 27)	Right-handed	Right arm fast	Overseas signing (19 August to the end of the season)

== County Championship ==
Kent played 16 County Championship matches in 2016, playing once at home and once away against each of the other eight counties in Division Two. Six home matches were played at the St Lawrence Ground in Canterbury, with one match at both the Nevill Ground in Tunbridge Wells and the County Cricket Ground, Beckenham. The county won five games, drew eight and lost only twice in the Championship, finishing second to Essex County Cricket Club. In previous years a second-place finish would have led to promotion to Division One of the Championship, but 2016 saw a rebalancing of the number of teams in each division and, as a result, only one team was promoted.

Kent's match against Worcestershire at New Road in April was abandoned without a ball bowled due to a water-logged outfield. This match was classed as a draw and five points were awarded to each team.

Durham, who had finished 4th in Division One, were deducted 48 points by the ECB at the end of the season as a result of their financial problems. This resulted in their relegation to Division Two. The ECB announced that Hampshire, who had finished 8th in Division One, would be reprieved from relegation. Kent chairman, George Kennedy, launched an appeal claiming that Kent should be promoted instead of this reprieve for Hampshire given the one-off scenario of the runners-up of Division Two missing out on promotion in 2016. The ECB did not change their decision, meaning that Kent will remain in Division Two for the 2017 season.

=== Division Two ===
Team	Pld	W	L	T	D	A	Bat	Bowl	Ded	Pts
Essex (P)	16	6	3	0	7	0	58	46	0	235
Kent	16	5	2	0	8	1	49	38	0	212
Worcestershire	16	6	4	0	5	1	42	35	0	203
Sussex	16	4	2	0	10	0	40	38	0	192
Northamptonshire	16	4	3	0	8	1	42	33	0	184
Gloucestershire	16	4	5	0	7	0	44	40	0	183
Leicestershire	16	4	4	0	8	0	39	40	1	182
Glamorgan	16	3	8	0	5	0	34	42	1	148
Derbyshire	16	0	5	0	10	1	32	32	0	119

=== Matches ===
10–13 April	Worcestershire (H)	v	Kent	Match abandoned without a ball bowled
Scorecard				New Road, Worcester; Umpires: IJ Gould and RK Illingworth
No toss; No play due to a wet outfield; Points: Worcestershire 5, Kent 5

24–27 April	Kent	v	(H) Leicestershire	Match drawn
Scorecard	264 (81.5 overs); DJ Bell-Drummond 124 (190); CJ McKay 3/66 (22 overs)		401/9d (88 overs); NJ Dexter 131 (205); MT Coles 3/95 (24 overs)	Grace Road, Leicester; Umpires: RJ Evans and SC Gale
Scorecard	85/2 (26 overs); SR Dickson 34* (83); CJ McKay 2/19 (6 overs)			Grace Road, Leicester; Umpires: RJ Evans and SC Gale
Kent won the toss and elected to bat; Only 6.3 overs were possible on day 2 due to rain and bad light; Points: Leicestershire 13, Kent 10 SR Dickson was out handled the ball for a duck in Kent's first innings

1–4 May	Glamorgan	v	(H) Kent	Kent won by 10 wickets
Scorecard	260 (64.5 overs); CAJ Meschede 63 (74); ME Claydon 4/59 (16 overs)		488 (111.2 overs); DJ Bell-Drummond 84 (119); MG Hogan 4/91 (29 overs)	St Lawrence Ground, Canterbury; Umpires: RJ Bailey and NGB Cook
Scorecard	414 (94.3 overs); DL Lloyd 107 (128); DI Stevens 4/79 (27 overs)		190/0 (48.4 overs); DJ Bell-Drummond 86* (147)	St Lawrence Ground, Canterbury; Umpires: RJ Bailey and NGB Cook
Glamorgan won the toss and elected to bat; Points: Kent 24, Glamorgan 5 HR Bernard made his first-class debut; TWM Latham made his Kent debut DJ Bell-Drummond and TWM Latham became the first Kent opening pair to post a century partnership in both innings of a championship match (131 and 190) since 1954; only the third instance of this in the club's history. After the match, MT Coles was reported by the umpires for a Level Two code breach (throwing the ball at or near a player). Combined with previous breaches, this resulted in a two-match ban from the County Championship.

8–11 May	Gloucestershire	v	(H) Kent	Match drawn
Scorecard	337 (107 overs); HJH Marshall 112 (202); CJ Haggett 3/66 (26 overs)		478/8d (126 overs); SA Northeast 189 (303); DA Payne 2/76 (30 overs)	St Lawrence Ground, Canterbury; Umpires: RJ Evans and RA Kettleborough
Scorecard	211/8 (58 overs); JMR Taylor 46* (45); CJ Haggett 3/27 (13 overs)			St Lawrence Ground, Canterbury; Umpires: RJ Evans and RA Kettleborough
Gloucestershire won the toss and elected to bat; No play was possible in the morning session of days 3 or 4 due to rain; Points: Kent 12, Gloucestershire 10 SA Northeast's 189 in the first innings was his highest score in first-class cricket

15–18 May	Kent	v	(H) Northamptonshire	Match drawn
Scorecard	396 (115.5 overs); JL Denly 206* (315); RK Kleinveldt 3/53 (17.5 overs)		498 (140.2 overs); AG Wakely 87 (161); Imran Qayyum 3/158 (41.2 overs)	County Ground, Northampton; Umpires: ID Blackwell and JW Lloyds
Scorecard	131/2 (40 overs); DJ Bell-Drummond 69* (111); RI Keogh 1/24 (8 overs)			County Ground, Northampton; Umpires: ID Blackwell and JW Lloyds
Kent won the toss and elected to bat; Only 11 overs were bowled on the fourth day due to rain and bad light and the match was abandoned as a draw at tea; Points: Northamptonshire 11, Kent 11 Imran Qayyum made his first-class debut JL Denly's 206* in the first innings was his highest score in first-class cricket

22–25 May	Derbyshire (H)	v	Kent	Kent won by 7 wickets
Scorecard	492 (125.5 overs); S Thakor 130 (164); MT Coles 5/116 (34.5 overs)		412 (126 overs); SR Dickson 207* (362); S Thakor 5/63 (19 overs)	County Ground, Derby; Umpires: DJ Millns and NA Mallender
Scorecard	94 (28.4 overs); WL Madsen 37 (54); CJ Haggett 4/15 (6.4 overs)		176/3 (32.3 overs); DJ Bell-Drummond 80* (99); CF Hughes 1/11 (1 over)	County Ground, Derby; Umpires: DJ Millns and NA Mallender
Derbyshire won the toss and elected to bat; Only 4 overs were possible after tea on day 2 due to rain; Points: Derbyshire 7, Kent 21 JL Denly retired not out before the start of play on day 3 to be with his wife who had gone into labour with their first child, and did not return for the remainder of the match SR Dickson's 207* in the Kent first innings was his highest score in first-class cricket

29 May – 1 June	Leicestershire	v	(H) Kent	Match drawn
Scorecard	341 (98.3 overs); MJ Cosgrove 119 (170); DI Stevens 4/74 (24 overs)		117/2 (44 overs); DJ Bell-Drummond 65* (125); BA Raine 1/20 (11 overs)	St Lawrence Ground, Canterbury; Umpires: PR Pollard and AG Wharf
Leicestershire won the toss and elected to bat; 47 overs were lost throughout day 2 (including no play after tea), and no play was possible on days 3 or 4 due to bad light and rain; Points: Kent 8, Leicestershire 8

19–22 June	Glamorgan (H)	v	Kent	Match drawn
Scorecard	351 (80 overs); GG Wagg 83 (120); ME Claydon 5/106 (23 overs)		282 (88.3 overs); SR Dickson 75 (138); T van der Gugten 5/79 (26.3 overs)	SWALEC Stadium, Cardiff; Umpires: SC Gale and RT Robinson
Scorecard	279/6d (73 overs); AHT Donald 67 (68); ME Claydon 3/50 (15 overs)			SWALEC Stadium, Cardiff; Umpires: SC Gale and RT Robinson
Toss uncontested, Kent elected to field; Only 21.5 overs were possible on day 1 due to rain, and there was no play before lunch on day 2; Points: Glamorgan 12, Kent 10

26–29 June	Kent (H)	v	Derbyshire	Match drawn
Scorecard	379 (105.2 overs); SA Northeast 191 (266); AP Palladino 4/76 (29 overs)		574/9d (162.4 overs); WL Madsen 163 (293); JC Tredwell 3/153 (48.4 overs)	St Lawrence Ground, Canterbury; Umpires: NL Bainton and SJ O'Shaughnessy
Scorecard	238/3 (74 overs); TWM Latham 74 (164); NT Broom 1/17 (6 overs)			St Lawrence Ground, Canterbury; Umpires: NL Bainton and SJ O'Shaughnessy
Toss uncontested, Derbyshire elected to field; No play was possible after tea on day 4; Points: Kent 10, Derbyshire 12 SA Northeast's 191 in the first innings was his highest score in first-class cricket

3–6 July	Kent	v	Essex (H)	Essex won by 10 wickets
Scorecard	207 (62.3 overs); AJ Blake 89* (116); JA Porter 3/51 (18 overs)		569 (145.3 overs); RS Bopara 94 (157); K Rabada 4/118 (34 overs)	County Ground, Chelmsford; Umpires: SA Garratt and DJ Millns
Scorecard	377 (122 overs); SA Northeast 166* (320); MR Quinn 4/60 (24 overs)		10/0 (1.4 overs); NLJ Browne 8* (6)	County Ground, Chelmsford; Umpires: SA Garratt and DJ Millns
Essex won the toss and elected to field; Points: Essex 24, Kent 2 CF Jackson made his Kent debut SA Northeast and JC Tredwell set a new Kent first-class record for the 8th wicket, scoring 222 in the Kent second innings JC Tredwell set a Kent record for the highest score by a number 9 batsman, and a personal high score in first-class cricket, scoring 124 in Kent's second innings

17–20 July	Kent (H)	v	Sussex	Match drawn
Scorecard	575 (158.3 overs); SA Northeast 190 (244); DR Briggs 5/169 (49.3 overs)		333 (127.1 overs); LRPL Taylor 142*; K Rabada 3/81 (28 overs)	Nevill Ground, Tunbridge Wells; Umpires: NGB Cook and VK Sharma
Scorecard			255/5 (91 overs) (f/o); LRPL Taylor 68 (89); JC Tredwell 3/76 (30 overs)	Nevill Ground, Tunbridge Wells; Umpires: NGB Cook and VK Sharma
Kent won the toss and elected to bat; Points: Kent 11, Sussex 8

3–6 August	Worcestershire	v	(H) Kent	Kent won by 10 wickets
Scorecard	211 (73.1 overs); JM Clarke 69 (124); ME Claydon 5/42 (17 overs)		451 (129.3 overs); DI Stevens 81 (105); EG Barnard 3/97 (27 overs)	St Lawrence Ground, Canterbury; Umpires: BV Taylor and AG Wharf
Scorecard	251 (93.3 overs); GH Rhodes 55 (114); DI Stevens 3/31 (12.3 overs)		14/0 (1.5 overs); SR Dickson 4* (7)	St Lawrence Ground, Canterbury; Umpires: BV Taylor and AG Wharf
Kent won the toss and elected to field; Points: Kent 23, Worcestershire 4

23–26 August	Gloucestershire (H)	v	Kent	Kent won by an innings and 69 runs
Scorecard	221 (94.2 overs); HJH Marshall 58 (192); GC Viljoen 5/55 (22.2 overs)		533/6d (119.4 overs); SW Billings 171 (202); LC Norwell 2/88 (27 overs)	County Ground, Bristol; Umpires: PK Baldwin and AG Wharf
Scorecard	243 (86.3 overs); HJH Marshall 118 (213); DI Stevens 3/47 (19 overs)			County Ground, Bristol; Umpires: PK Baldwin and AG Wharf
Toss uncontested, Kent elected to field; Several overs were lost during day 3 due to rain and bad light; Points: Gloucestershire 2, Kent 24 GC Viljoen made his Kent debut SW Billings' 171 in the first innings was his highest score in first-class cricket

31 August – 3 September	Sussex (H)	v	Kent	Kent won by an innings and 127 runs
Scorecard	180 (40.5 overs); BC Brown 54 (47); GC Viljoen 3/70 (12 overs)		496 (132.5 overs); WRS Gidman 99* (240); SJ Magoffin 5/88 (34.5 overs)	County Ground, Hove; Umpires: SA Garratt and SJ O'Shaughnessy
Scorecard	189 (41.5 overs); C Cachopa 34 (42); GC Viljoen 3/34 (9 overs)			County Ground, Hove; Umpires: SA Garratt and SJ O'Shaughnessy
Toss uncontested, Kent elected to field; Points: Sussex 2, Kent 24

6–9 September	Kent (H)	v	Northamptonshire	Northamptonshire won by 10 wickets
Scorecard	230 (82.2 overs); SR Dickson 63 (159); RK Kleinveldt 3/70 (20.2 overs)		384 (97.4 overs); BM Duckett 204 (251); ME Claydon 3/73 (16 overs)	County Ground, Beckenham; Umpires: NL Bainton and JW Lloyds
Scorecard	184 (56.4 overs); GC Viljoen 63 (106); RK Kleinveldt 5/53 (21 overs)		13/0 (4.3 overs); RI Newton 15* (14)	County Ground, Beckenham; Umpires: NL Bainton and JW Lloyds
Toss uncontested, Northamptonshire elected to field; Points: Kent 4, Northamptonshire 23 SW Billings replaced CF Jackson for Kent on day 3 after being released from England duty, having been selected in the squad for the Twenty20 international against Pakistan but not being chosen for the playing XI.

20–23 September	Kent (H)	v	Essex	Match drawn
Scorecard	441 (108.1 overs); DI Stevens 136 (161); MW Dixon 5/124 (28.1 overs)		292 (82.4 overs); DW Lawrence 88 (156); GC Viljoen 3/69 (14 overs)	St Lawrence Ground, Canterbury; Umpires: RJ Evans and GD Lloyd
Scorecard	288/5d (67 overs); SA Northeast 178* (177); DD Masters 2/32 (17 overs)			St Lawrence Ground, Canterbury; Umpires: RJ Evans and GD Lloyd
Toss uncontested, Essex elected to field; No play was possible on day 1 due to a wet outfield; Points: Kent 13, Essex 10

== Other first-class match ==
Kent played a three-day match with first-class status against Loughborough MCC University before the start of the County Championship season. Daniel Bell-Drummond scored his maiden first-class double century on day one, but only 6.3 overs were possible on day two due to rain, and the match ended in a draw.

5–7 April	Kent (H)	v	Loughborough MCCU	Match drawn
Scorecard	393/7d (80.1 overs); DJ Bell-Drummond 206* (246); S Cook 3/64 (17.1 overs)		313/8d (74 overs); BMR Akram 100* (137); MT Coles 3/75 (18 overs)	St Lawrence Ground, Canterbury; Umpires: BJ Debenham and MJ Saggers
Kent won the toss and elected to bat; Only 6.3 overs were bowled on day 2 due to rain; AP Rouse made his debut for Kent

== Royal London One-Day Cup ==
Kent began their 2016 Royal London One-Day Cup campaign with a match against Surrey at the County Ground, Beckenham on Sunday 5 June. They played 8 games in the group stage of the competition, finishing in second place and securing a home quarter-final against Yorkshire. Kent lost the quarter-final by 11 runs, being bowled out chasing Yorkshire's score of 256.

=== South Group ===
Pos	Team	Pld	W	L	T	NR	Ded	Pts	NRR
1	Somerset	8	6	1	1	0	0	13	−0.087
2	Kent Spitfires	8	5	3	0	0	0	10	0.587
3	Essex Eagles	8	4	2	1	1	0	10	−0.119
4	Surrey	8	4	3	0	1	0	9	0.992
5	Hampshire	8	4	4	0	0	0	8	0.393
6	Middlesex	8	4	4	0	0	0	8	0.117
7	Glamorgan	8	3	4	0	1	0	7	−0.320
8	Gloucestershire	8	2	5	0	1	0	5	−0.709
9	Sussex Sharks	8	1	7	0	0	0	2	−0.679

=== Matches ===
5 June	Surrey; 255/8 (50 overs)	v	(H) Kent; 260/9 (49.5 overs)	Kent won by 1 wicket (with 1 ball remaining)
Scorecard	Surrey; 255/8 (50 overs)	v	(H) Kent; 260/9 (49.5 overs)	County Ground, Beckenham; Umpires: GD Lloyd and NA Mallender; Player of the match: AJ Blake (Kent)
Scorecard	KC Sangakkara 58 (50); JC Tredwell 2/33 (10 overs)		AJ Blake 66* (62); SC Meaker 3/47 (7 overs)	County Ground, Beckenham; Umpires: GD Lloyd and NA Mallender; Player of the match: AJ Blake (Kent)
Surrey won the toss and elected to bat; Points: Kent 2, Surrey 0				County Ground, Beckenham; Umpires: GD Lloyd and NA Mallender; Player of the match: AJ Blake (Kent)

12 June	Kent (H); 290/3 (42 overs)	v	Glamorgan; 294/7 (40.5 overs)	Glamorgan won by 3 wickets (with 7 balls remaining) (D/L method)
Scorecard	Kent (H); 290/3 (42 overs)	v	Glamorgan; 294/7 (40.5 overs)	St Lawrence Ground, Canterbury; Umpires: M Burns and SJ O'Shaughnessy
Scorecard	SW Billings 106* (54); T van der Gugten 1/60 (8 overs)		CA Ingram 95* (53); JC Tredwell 3/55 (8 overs)	St Lawrence Ground, Canterbury; Umpires: M Burns and SJ O'Shaughnessy
Glamorgan won the toss and elected to field; Rain delayed Kent's innings after 29.1 overs with the score on 141/3; The match was reduced to 42 overs per side, and Glamorgan's adjusted target was 293 to win; Points: Kent 0, Glamorgan 2				St Lawrence Ground, Canterbury; Umpires: M Burns and SJ O'Shaughnessy

14 June	Kent (H); 231/6 (30 overs)	v	Somerset; 136 (24.2 overs)	Kent won by 95 runs
Scorecard	Kent (H); 231/6 (30 overs)	v	Somerset; 136 (24.2 overs)	St Lawrence Ground, Canterbury; Umpires: JH Evans and SA Garratt
Scorecard	DJ Bell-Drummond 68 (51); L Gregory 3/37 (6 overs)		RE van der Merwe 29 (22); IAA Thomas 3/31 (5 overs)	St Lawrence Ground, Canterbury; Umpires: JH Evans and SA Garratt
Somerset won the toss and elected to field; Match reduced to 30 overs per side before play began; Points: Kent 2, Somerset 0				St Lawrence Ground, Canterbury; Umpires: JH Evans and SA Garratt

15 June	Kent; 285/8 (50 overs)	v	Essex (H); 289/5 (49.1 overs)	Essex won by 5 wickets (with 5 balls remaining)
Scorecard	Kent; 285/8 (50 overs)	v	Essex (H); 289/5 (49.1 overs)	County Ground, Chelmsford; Umpires: SC Gale and JW Lloyds
Scorecard	MT Coles 91 (52); Ashar Zaidi 3/33 (7 overs)		RS Bopara 74* (79); JC Tredwell 2/41 (8 overs)	County Ground, Chelmsford; Umpires: SC Gale and JW Lloyds
Essex won the toss and elected to field; Essex 2 points, Kent 0				County Ground, Chelmsford; Umpires: SC Gale and JW Lloyds

24 July	Kent; 238/7 (50 overs)	v	(H) Middlesex; 239/4 (44.5 overs)	Middlesex won by 6 wickets (with 31 balls remaining)
Scorecard	Kent; 238/7 (50 overs)	v	(H) Middlesex; 239/4 (44.5 overs)	Lord's, St John's Wood, London; Umpires: PK Baldwin and JW Lloyds
Scorecard	SR Dickson 99 (126); TJ Murtagh 2/28 (10 overs)		PR Stirling 112 (133); MT Coles 2/37 (7.5 overs)	Lord's, St John's Wood, London; Umpires: PK Baldwin and JW Lloyds
Kent won the toss and elected to bat; Points: Middlesex 2, Kent 0 WRS Gidman made his Kent debut				Lord's, St John's Wood, London; Umpires: PK Baldwin and JW Lloyds

26 July	Hampshire (H); 229 (47.5 overs)	v	Kent; 231/5 (43.3 overs)	Kent won by 5 wickets (with 39 balls remaining)
Scorecard	Hampshire (H); 229 (47.5 overs)	v	Kent; 231/5 (43.3 overs)	Ageas Bowl, Southampton; Umpires: NL Bainton and JH Evans
Scorecard	AJA Wheater 63 (73); MT Coles 6/56 (10 overs)		JL Denly 105 (131); BTJ Wheal 4/38 (7.3 overs)	Ageas Bowl, Southampton; Umpires: NL Bainton and JH Evans
Kent won the toss and elected to field; Points: Hampshire 0, Kent 2				Ageas Bowl, Southampton; Umpires: NL Bainton and JH Evans

31 July	Gloucestershire; 200 (49.2 overs)	v	(H) Kent; 203/3 (41.2 overs)	Kent won by 7 wickets (with 52 balls remaining)
Scorecard	Gloucestershire; 200 (49.2 overs)	v	(H) Kent; 203/3 (41.2 overs)	St Lawrence Ground, Canterbury; Umpires: RJ Bailey and SA Garratt
Scorecard	HJH Marshall 43 (59); WRS Gidman 3/28 (8 overs)		JL Denly 82* (124); BAC Howell 1/27 (8 overs)	St Lawrence Ground, Canterbury; Umpires: RJ Bailey and SA Garratt
Kent won the toss and elected to field; Points: Kent 2, Gloucestershire 0				St Lawrence Ground, Canterbury; Umpires: RJ Bailey and SA Garratt

2 August	Sussex (H); 182/8 (43 overs)	v	Kent; 184/3 (31.5 overs)	Kent won by 7 wickets (with 67 balls remaining)
Scorecard	Sussex (H); 182/8 (43 overs)	v	Kent; 184/3 (31.5 overs)	County Ground, Hove; Umpires: NA Mallender and RT Robinson
Scorecard	HZ Finch 54 (88); MT Coles 4/39 (9 overs)		SA Northeast 66* (77); CAL Davis 1/25 (3 overs)	County Ground, Hove; Umpires: NA Mallender and RT Robinson
Kent won the toss and elected to field; Match reduced to 43 overs per side before play began due to rain; Points: Sussex 0, Kent 2				County Ground, Hove; Umpires: NA Mallender and RT Robinson

=== Quarter-finals ===
18 August	Yorkshire; 256/9 (50 overs)	v	(H) Kent; 245 (47.5 overs)	Yorkshire won by 11 runs
Scorecard	Yorkshire; 256/9 (50 overs)	v	(H) Kent; 245 (47.5 overs)	St Lawrence Ground, Canterbury; Umpires: NA Mallender and AG Wharf
Scorecard	A Lyth 88 (96); MT Coles 3/39 (10 overs)		DI Stevens 54 (74); LE Plunkett 4/52 (10 overs)	St Lawrence Ground, Canterbury; Umpires: NA Mallender and AG Wharf
Kent won the toss and elected to field; Yorkshire advanced				St Lawrence Ground, Canterbury; Umpires: NA Mallender and AG Wharf

== NatWest t20 Blast ==
Kent began their t20 Blast campaign in the South Group with a match against Somerset at the St Lawrence Ground, Canterbury on Friday 20 May. They played 14 games in the group stage of the competition, winning six and failing to qualify for the knock-out stages after losing their final two matches. As well as five home matches at Canterbury, a single match was hosted at each of Beckenham and Tunbridge Wells.

=== South Group ===
Pos	Team	Pld	W	L	T	NR	Ded	Pts	NRR
1	Gloucestershire	14	10	3	0	1	0	21	0.518
2	Glamorgan	14	8	3	0	3	0	19	1.005
3	Middlesex	14	7	6	0	1	0	15	0.395
4	Essex Eagles	14	7	6	0	1	0	15	0.174
5	Surrey	14	7	7	0	0	0	14	0.153
6	Sussex Sharks	14	5	6	0	3	0	13	−0.053
7	Kent Spitfires	14	6	8	0	0	0	12	−0.643
8	Hampshire	14	4	8	0	2	0	10	−0.691
9	Somerset	14	3	10	0	1	0	7	−0.660

=== Matches ===
20 May	Somerset; 197/7 (20 overs)	v	(H) Kent; 200/2 (17.2 overs)	Kent won by 8 wickets (with 16 balls remaining)
Scorecard	Somerset; 197/7 (20 overs)	v	(H) Kent; 200/2 (17.2 overs)	St Lawrence Ground, Canterbury; Umpires: NL Bainton and NJ Llong; Player of the match: DJ Bell-Drummond (Kent)
Scorecard	J Allenby 91 (59); FK Cowdrey 3/18 (3 overs)		DJ Bell-Drummond 83* (47); RE van der Merwe 1/35 (3 overs)	St Lawrence Ground, Canterbury; Umpires: NL Bainton and NJ Llong; Player of the match: DJ Bell-Drummond (Kent)
Somerset won the toss and elected to bat; Points: Kent 2, Somerset 0 The opening stand of 150 between DJ Bell-Drummond and JL Denly was the highest T20 partnership for any wicket for Kent				St Lawrence Ground, Canterbury; Umpires: NL Bainton and NJ Llong; Player of the match: DJ Bell-Drummond (Kent)

2 June	Hampshire (H); 158/8 (20 overs)	v	Kent; 149 (19.3 overs)	Hampshire won by 9 runs
Scorecard	Hampshire (H); 158/8 (20 overs)	v	Kent; 149 (19.3 overs)	Ageas Bowl, Southampton; Umpires: NGB Cook and RJ Evans; Player of the match: Shahid Afridi (Hampshire)
Scorecard	MA Carberry 54 (53); MT Coles 4/27 (4 overs)		DJ Bell-Drummond 64 (51); Shahid Afridi 3/33 (4 overs)	Ageas Bowl, Southampton; Umpires: NGB Cook and RJ Evans; Player of the match: Shahid Afridi (Hampshire)
Kent won the toss and elected to field; Points: Hampshire 2, Kent 0				Ageas Bowl, Southampton; Umpires: NGB Cook and RJ Evans; Player of the match: Shahid Afridi (Hampshire)

3 June	Kent (H); 144/7 (20 overs)	v	Gloucestershire; 146/3 (19.2 overs)	Gloucestershire won by 7 wickets (with 4 balls remaining)
Scorecard	Kent (H); 144/7 (20 overs)	v	Gloucestershire; 146/3 (19.2 overs)	County Ground, Beckenham; Umpires: RJ Bailey and BV Taylor; Player of the match: AJ Tye (Gloucestershire)
Scorecard	SA Northeast 35 (34); AJ Tye 3/18 (4 overs)		HJH Marshall 56 (42); DI Stevens 1/20 (2.2 overs)	County Ground, Beckenham; Umpires: RJ Bailey and BV Taylor; Player of the match: AJ Tye (Gloucestershire)
Gloucestershire won the toss and elected to field; Points: Kent 0, Gloucestershire 2				County Ground, Beckenham; Umpires: RJ Bailey and BV Taylor; Player of the match: AJ Tye (Gloucestershire)

8 June	Kent (H); 193/3 (20 overs)	v	Hampshire; 185/9 (20 overs)	Kent won by 8 runs
Scorecard	Kent (H); 193/3 (20 overs)	v	Hampshire; 185/9 (20 overs)	St Lawrence Ground, Canterbury; Umpires: GD Lloyd and AG Wharf; Player of the match: SW Billings (Kent)
Scorecard	JL Denly 59 (38); TL Best 2/38 (4 overs)		SM Ervine 56 (34); DA Griffiths 2/24 (4 overs)	St Lawrence Ground, Canterbury; Umpires: GD Lloyd and AG Wharf; Player of the match: SW Billings (Kent)
Hampshire won the toss and elected to field; Points: Kent 2, Hampshire 0				St Lawrence Ground, Canterbury; Umpires: GD Lloyd and AG Wharf; Player of the match: SW Billings (Kent)

10 June	Sussex (H); 140 (20 overs)	v	Kent; 143/6 (19.3 overs)	Sussex won by 4 wickets (with 3 balls remaining)
Scorecard	Sussex (H); 140 (20 overs)	v	Kent; 143/6 (19.3 overs)	County Ground, Hove; Umpires: PK Baldwin and AG Wharf; Player of the match: LRPL Taylor (Sussex)
Scorecard	SA Northeast 53 (43); TS Mills 3/15 (4 overs)		LRPL Taylor 62 (50); ME Claydon 3/25 (4 overs)	County Ground, Hove; Umpires: PK Baldwin and AG Wharf; Player of the match: LRPL Taylor (Sussex)
Sussex won the toss and elected to field; Points: Sussex 2, Kent 0				County Ground, Hove; Umpires: PK Baldwin and AG Wharf; Player of the match: LRPL Taylor (Sussex)

17 June	Glamorgan (H); 175/4 (16 overs)	v	Kent; 121 (15.5 overs)	Glamorgan won by 55 runs (D/L method)
Scorecard	Glamorgan (H); 175/4 (16 overs)	v	Kent; 121 (15.5 overs)	SWALEC Stadium, Cardiff; Umpires: JH Evans and BV Taylor; Player of the match: DL Lloyd (Glamorgan)
Scorecard	DL Lloyd 97* (49); ME Claydon 2/27 (3 overs)		MT Coles 31 (17); DW Steyn 4/18 (4 overs)	SWALEC Stadium, Cardiff; Umpires: JH Evans and BV Taylor; Player of the match: DL Lloyd (Glamorgan)
Kent won the toss and elected to field; Match reduced to 16 overs per side due to rain; Kent's D-L victory target was 177 runs from 16 overs				SWALEC Stadium, Cardiff; Umpires: JH Evans and BV Taylor; Player of the match: DL Lloyd (Glamorgan)

24 June	Kent (H); 210/6 (20 overs)	v	Middlesex; 170/7 (20 overs)	Middlesex won by 40 runs
Scorecard	Kent (H); 210/6 (20 overs)	v	Middlesex; 170/7 (20 overs)	St Lawrence Ground, Canterbury; Umpires: NGB Cook and RJ Evans; Player of the match: BB McCullum (Middlesex)
Scorecard	BB McCullum 87* (57); DI Stevens 4/31 (4 overs)		FK Cowdrey 71 (42); TS Roland-Jones 3/24 (4 overs)	St Lawrence Ground, Canterbury; Umpires: NGB Cook and RJ Evans; Player of the match: BB McCullum (Middlesex)
Middlesex won the toss and elected to bat; Points: Kent 0, Middlesex 2				St Lawrence Ground, Canterbury; Umpires: NGB Cook and RJ Evans; Player of the match: BB McCullum (Middlesex)

30 June	Kent (H); 166/6 (20 overs)	v	Sussex; 156/4 (20 overs)	Kent won by 10 runs
Scorecard	Kent (H); 166/6 (20 overs)	v	Sussex; 156/4 (20 overs)	St Lawrence Ground, Canterbury; Umpires: DJ Millns and SJ O'Shaughnessy; Player of the match: K Rabada (Kent)
Scorecard	TWM Latham 48 (34); A Shahzad 2/29 (3 overs)		LRPL Taylor 49 (32); FK Cowdrey 2/8 (2 overs)	St Lawrence Ground, Canterbury; Umpires: DJ Millns and SJ O'Shaughnessy; Player of the match: K Rabada (Kent)
Kent won the toss and elected to bat; Points: Kent 2, Sussex 0 K Rabada made his debut for Kent in this match The Sussex innings was twice delayed due to the bright setting sun				St Lawrence Ground, Canterbury; Umpires: DJ Millns and SJ O'Shaughnessy; Player of the match: K Rabada (Kent)

1 July	Essex (H); 204/3 (20 overs)	v	Kent; 154/9 (20 overs)	Essex won by 50 runs
Scorecard	Essex (H); 204/3 (20 overs)	v	Kent; 154/9 (20 overs)	County Ground, Chelmsford; Umpires: GD Lloyd and BV Taylor; Player of the match: RS Bopara (Essex)
Scorecard	RS Bopara 81* (43); K Rabada 1/30 (4 overs)		AJ Blake 37 (31); PI Walter 3/26 (4 overs)	County Ground, Chelmsford; Umpires: GD Lloyd and BV Taylor; Player of the match: RS Bopara (Essex)
Kent won the toss and elected to field; Points: Kent 0, Essex 2				County Ground, Chelmsford; Umpires: GD Lloyd and BV Taylor; Player of the match: RS Bopara (Essex)

7 July	Kent; 187/5 (20 overs)	v	(H) Somerset; 175/9 (20 overs)	Kent won by 12 runs
Scorecard	Kent; 187/5 (20 overs)	v	(H) Somerset; 175/9 (20 overs)	County Ground, Taunton; Umpires: RA Kettleborough and RT Robinson; Player of the match: SA Northeast (Kent)
Scorecard	SA Northeast 75 (42); L Gregory 2/32 (4 overs)		PD Trego 63 (34); DI Stevens 3/30 (4 overs)	County Ground, Taunton; Umpires: RA Kettleborough and RT Robinson; Player of the match: SA Northeast (Kent)
Kent won the toss and elected to bat; Points: Somerset 0, Kent 2				County Ground, Taunton; Umpires: RA Kettleborough and RT Robinson; Player of the match: SA Northeast (Kent)

8 July	Kent; 148/7 (20 overs)	v	(H) Gloucestershire; 145/8 (20 overs)	Kent won by 3 runs
Scorecard	Kent; 148/7 (20 overs)	v	(H) Gloucestershire; 145/8 (20 overs)	County Ground, Bristol; Umpires: SC Gale and RT Robinson; Player of the match: JL Denly (Kent)
Scorecard	JL Denly 51 (35); BAC Howell 3/29 (4 overs)		M Klinger 42 (31); DA Griffiths 2/22 (3 overs)	County Ground, Bristol; Umpires: SC Gale and RT Robinson; Player of the match: JL Denly (Kent)
Gloucestershire won the toss and elected to field; Points: Gloucestershire 0, Kent 2				County Ground, Bristol; Umpires: SC Gale and RT Robinson; Player of the match: JL Denly (Kent)

15 July	Surrey; 180/8 (20 overs)	v	(H) Kent; 181/2 (19.4 overs)	Kent won by 8 wickets (with 2 balls remaining)
Scorecard	Surrey; 180/8 (20 overs)	v	(H) Kent; 181/2 (19.4 overs)	Nevill Ground, Tunbridge Wells; Umpires: DJ Millns and PR Pollard; Player of the match: DJ Bell-Drummond (Kent)
Scorecard	JJ Roy 52 (29); JC Tredwell 3/32 (4 overs)		DJ Bell-Drummond 112* (65); SM Curran 1/23 (3 overs)	Nevill Ground, Tunbridge Wells; Umpires: DJ Millns and PR Pollard; Player of the match: DJ Bell-Drummond (Kent)
Surrey won the toss and elected to bat; Points: Kent 2, Surrey 0 The second wicket partnership of 151 between DJ Bell-Drummond and SA Northeast was the highest T20 partnership for any wicket for Kent				Nevill Ground, Tunbridge Wells; Umpires: DJ Millns and PR Pollard; Player of the match: DJ Bell-Drummond (Kent)

22 July	Essex; 190/2 (20 overs)	v	(H) Kent; 157 (19.2 overs)	Essex won by 33 runs
Scorecard	Essex; 190/2 (20 overs)	v	(H) Kent; 157 (19.2 overs)	St Lawrence Ground, Canterbury; Umpires: PK Baldwin and JW Lloyds; Player of the match: T Westley (Essex)
Scorecard	T Westley 74* (49); MT Coles 2/28 (4 overs)		DI Stevens 33 (25); GR Napier 3/29 (3.2 overs)	St Lawrence Ground, Canterbury; Umpires: PK Baldwin and JW Lloyds; Player of the match: T Westley (Essex)
Essex won the toss and elected to bat; Points: Kent 0, Essex 2				St Lawrence Ground, Canterbury; Umpires: PK Baldwin and JW Lloyds; Player of the match: T Westley (Essex)

29 July	Surrey (H); 212/4 (20 overs)	v	Kent; 175/7 (20 overs)	Surrey won by 37 runs
Scorecard	Surrey (H); 212/4 (20 overs)	v	Kent; 175/7 (20 overs)	The Oval, Kennington, London; Umpires: PK Baldwin and PJ Hartley; Player of the match: JJ Roy (Surrey)
Scorecard	JJ Roy 120* (62); DA Griffiths 2/47 (4 overs)		SA Northeast 59 (44); CH Morris 2/38 (4 overs)	The Oval, Kennington, London; Umpires: PK Baldwin and PJ Hartley; Player of the match: JJ Roy (Surrey)
Surrey won the toss and elected to bat; Points: Surrey 2, Kent 0				The Oval, Kennington, London; Umpires: PK Baldwin and PJ Hartley; Player of the match: JJ Roy (Surrey)
