= Kent League =

Kent League may refer to:

- Southern Counties East Football League, known as the Kent League until 2013
- Kent Football League (1894–1959), an earlier league
- Kent Cricket League
