= European Cricket League =

Cricket league in Europe

- European Cricket League Logo
- Administrator: European Cricket Network
- Format: T10
- First edition: 2019
- Latest edition: 2025
- Next edition: 2026
- Tournament format: Group Stage and Knockout
- Number of teams: 35
- Current champion: (Jersey) Farmers
- Most successful: (France) Dreux Ville Royale (Jersey) Farmers (England) Hornchurch (Netherlands) VOC Rotterdam (Spain) Pak I Care Badalona (1 title each)
- Website: European Cricket Network

The European Cricket League (ECL) is a T10 cricket tournament featuring the champion clubs from domestic leagues across Europe, organised by the European Cricket Network (ECN).

== History ==
The league was founded in 2018 by Australian-born, German international cricketer Daniel Weston with eight official International Cricket Council member federations on board, namely Russia, Netherlands, France, Italy, Denmark, Romania, Spain and Germany for the first tournament in 2019.

The inaugural tournament took place at La Manga Club in Spain with eight clubs participating. VOC Rotterdam were crowned the champions after defeating SG Findorff of Germany by 101 runs in the final. Organisers said the event was viewed on live TV and streamed around the world in over 120 countries in more than 140 million households by over 40 broadcasters.

After cancellations due to the COVID-19 pandemic in 2020 and 2021, the event resumed at a new venue, the Cártama Oval Cricket Ground in the Province of Málaga, Spain, in 2022 and was won by Spanish team Pak I Care Badalona.

Dreux Ville Royale from France claimed victory in 2023 and England's Hornchurch secured the title in 2024. Jersey club Farmers were champions in 2025.

== Seasons and winners ==
Season	Winner	Runner-up	Win Margin	Most Runs	Most Wickets
(Spain) 2019	(Netherlands) VOC Rotterdam; 222/0 (10 overs)	(Germany) SG Findorff; 121/9 (10 overs)	101 Runs	(Netherlands) Scott Edwards (233)	(Spain) Syed Siiwiherazi (9)
(Spain) 2022	(Spain) Pak I Care Badalona; 84/3 (9 overs)	(England) Tunbridge Wells; 81/7 (10 overs)	7 Wickets	(England) Chris Williams (477)	(Spain) Muhammad Babar (23)
(Spain) 2023	(France) Dreux Ville Royale; 131/5 (10 overs)	(England) Hornchurch; 69/8 (10 overs)	62 Runs	(Ireland) Jason Van Der Merwe (641)	(France) Tabish Bhatti (27)
(Spain) 2024	(England) Hornchurch; 95/3 (8.5 overs)	(Jersey) Old Victorians; 93/5 (10 overs)	7 Wickets	(Jersey) Jonty Jenner (603)	(England) Harry Hankins (24)
(Spain) 2025	(Jersey) Farmers; 146/8 (10 overs)	(Italy) Roma; 104/9 (10 overs)	42 runs	(Switzerland) Faheem Nazir (383)	(Jersey) William Perchard (14)

== Performance by country ==
Country	Titles	Runners-up
England	1	2
Jersey	1	1
France	1	0
Netherlands	1	0
Spain	1	0
Germany	0	1
Italy	0	1
