= Callum Jackson =

English cricketer

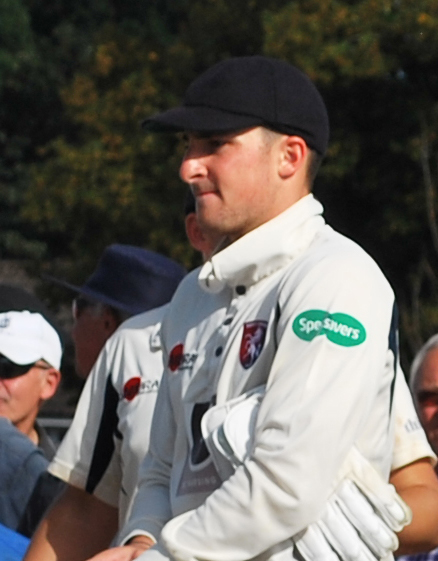
- Jackson whilst playing for Kent in September 2016

Personal information
- Full name: Callum Frederick Jackson
- Born: 7 September 1994 (age 32); Eastbourne, Sussex
- Batting: Right-handed
- Role: Wicket-keeper

Domestic team information
- Years: Team
- 2013–2015: Sussex (squad no. 16)
- 2016: Kent (squad no. 21)
- FC debut: 26 July 2013 Sussex v Australians
- LA debut: 13 August 2013 Sussex v Netherlands

Career statistics
Competition	FC	LA	T20
Matches	4	5	3
Runs scored	87	62	3
Batting average	17.40	–	3.00
100s/50s	0/0	0/0	0/0
Top score	38	34*	3
Catches/stumpings	10/0	3/2	0/3
- Source: CricInfo, 10 September 2016

Callum Frederick Jackson (born 7 September 1994) is an English professional cricketer who played most recently as a wicket-keeper for Kent County Cricket Club. Jackson made his first-class cricket debut for Sussex County Cricket Club in a three-day match against a touring Australian team in July 2013, having made his professional debut in Twenty20 matches earlier in the same month. He has represented England at under-19 level.

== Early life and career ==
Born in Eastbourne, Jackson was educated at St Bede's School, Eastbourne. He made his way through the Sussex youth ranks, playing at under-13, under-14, under-15 and under-17 level before joining the second XI as a 16-year-old in 2011. He was selected to represent an English Schools Cricket Association XI in 2011 before making his first appearance for the Sussex first XI on 1 May 2012 in a non-first-class match against the Leeds/Bradford MCC Universities team.

In early 2013, Jackson was selected for the England under-19 team to tour South Africa, where he played in both Youth Test matches and three One Day Internationals in a five-match series, as well as in the two-innings warm-up match against a Western Cape Invitation XI.

== Cricket career ==
With Sussex's first-choice wicket-keeper, Matt Prior, on England duty in the 2013 Ashes series and regular back-up Ben Brown injured with a broken finger, Jackson made his competitive debut for the club in a Friends Life t20 match against the Essex Eagles on 21 July 2013. Although he did not bat and Sussex lost by seven wickets, he made an impression by stumping Greg Smith, Hamish Rutherford and Ravi Bopara for Sussex's only wickets of the match. He appeared in a total of six limited overs matches for Sussex in 2013.

In December 2015, Jackson was released by Sussex due to financial cutbacks at the club after making one further appearance for the county in 2015.

In July 2016, he was registered to play for Kent as cover for Sam Billings and Adam Rouse after spells in both the Kent and Essex Second XIs. Jackson had appeared as a substitute fielder for Kent against Glamorgan in June following an injury to Rouse and made his County Championship debut in Kent's match against Essex at Chelmsford at the beginning of July. He signed a contract until the end of the season with Kent in mid-July, making his home debut for the club during Tunbridge Wells Cricket Week against his former county Sussex. He played in three first-class matches and one limited overs matches for Kent and was released at the end of the season.
