= Tunbridge Wells Cricket Week =

Annual cricket festival in Kent, England

Tunbridge Wells Cricket Week is a festival of cricket during which Kent County Cricket Club play their home matches at Tunbridge Wells Cricket Club's Nevill Ground in Royal Tunbridge Wells. Games held during it are considered some of Kent's most popular fixtures. Historically the event has usually been held in May or June but moved to July in 2015 for the 2015 and 2016 seasons. Following a reorganisation of the English domestic cricket season the week reverted to its more traditional place in the calendar for the 2017 season.

== History ==
The cricket week has been running since 1902, with a single Kent match held the previous year at the Nevill Ground. It is currently one of Kent's two outgrounds with all other home matches being played at the St. Lawrence Ground in Canterbury.

The week has had a poem written about it.

The annual cricket week was cancelled in 2020 because of the COVID-19 pandemic, and as of 2024 has not been held since. It is considered unlikely that the venue will hold any more County Championship matches, although the possibility of a return of men's white ball cricket remains.

== Cricket ==
A traditional cricket week at The Nevill Ground usually comprised two County Championship games, with occasional limited overs games added to the programme from the 1960s onwards. With the advent of Twenty20 cricket, the one day game was sometimes replaced with a Twenty20 game. In some years Kent have played an extra one day or T20 game during the week. For the 2017 season only a single four-day County Championship game was scheduled for the festival. This was due to the reorganisation of the English domestic cricket season by the England and Wales Cricket Board which led to Kent having to choose which of their two out-grounds to allocate a single one-day fixture to. The county opted to allocate the one-day game to their ground at Beckenham on the south-eastern edge of London rather than to Tunbridge Wells.

Games during the Tunbridge Wells Festival week are often high-scoring with the pitch at the Nevill Ground sometimes being considered a "batting paradise". This could be seen during the 2010 County Championship game against Nottinghamshire, where 1,242 runs were scored despite the game being hit with rain.
