= Nevill Ground =

Cricket ground in Royal Tunbridge Wells, Kent, England

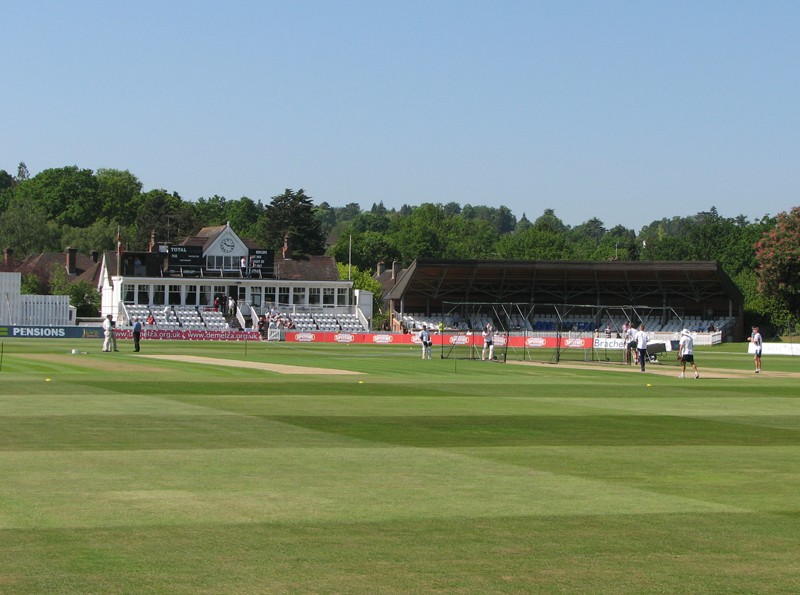
- The pavilion of the Nevill Ground
- Interactive map of Nevill Ground

Ground information
- Location: Royal Tunbridge Wells, Kent
- Country: England
- Coordinates: 51.122°N 0.268°E
- Establishment: 1898
- Capacity: 6,000
- Owner: Tunbridge Wells Borough Council
- Architect: CH Strange
- Tenants: Tunbridge Wells Cricket Club; Tunbridge Wells Tennis Club; Tunbridge Wells Hockey Club
- End names
- Pavilion End; Railway End

International information
- Only men's ODI: 18 June 1983: India v Zimbabwe
- Only women's ODI: 24 July 1993: Australia v West Indies

Team information
Tunbridge Wells Cricket Club	(1898–present)
Tunbridge Wells Tennis Club	(1899–present)
Kent County Cricket Club	(1901–2019)
- As of 5 September 2020; Source: CricInfo

The Nevill Ground is a cricket ground at Royal Tunbridge Wells in the English county of Kent. It is owned by Tunbridge Wells Borough Council and is used by Tunbridge Wells Cricket Club in the summer months and by Tunbridge Wells Hockey Club in the winter. It is also used by the Tunbridge Wells Harriers running club. It was opened in 1898 and was first used by Kent County Cricket Club in 1901. Until 2019, the county held the Tunbridge Wells Cricket Week on the ground annually, despite a suffragette arson attack which destroyed the pavilion in 1913.

As well as hosting over 180 of Kent's first-class cricket matches, the ground played host to a single One Day International during the 1983 Cricket World Cup and was used for one match during the 1993 Women's Cricket World Cup.

The ground is known for being one of the more picturesque county grounds in England and particularly for having rhododendron bushes around the perimeter. It is located around 1 mile (1.6 km) south-east of the centre of Tunbridge Wells in Hawkenbury.

== History ==
The ground was established after the purchase of the land, in 1895, by the Tunbridge Wells Cricket, Football and Athletic Club and the Bluemantle's Cricket Club on a 99-year lease from William Nevill, 1st Marquess of Abergavenny. It had formed part of his Eridge Park estate on the edge of Tunbridge Wells. Building of the ground's facilities started in 1896 and it was officially opened by the Marquess, after whom the ground was named, in 1898.

The original cricket pavilion on the ground was designed by local architect CH Strange and built in 1903 at a cost of £1,200. It was destroyed in an arson attack, generally believed to have been the responsibility of militant suffragettes, in April 1913. During the First World War the ground was requisitioned by the British army to graze cavalry horses, damaging the pitch, and during the Second World War it was again requisitioned for military purposes, this time to billet soldiers. Ownership of the ground was transferred in 1946 from the Marquess of Abergavenny to Tunbridge Wells Borough Council after Tunbridge Wells Cricket, Football and Athletic Club had already transferred the lease a year prior.

In the early 20th century the county boundary between Kent and Sussex ran through the ground, the course of a stream beneath the ground marking the boundary at the time. The rhododendron bushes around the ground are considered by cricket commentators as one of the defining images of the Nevill Ground and the ground has been described as "one of the finest cricket grounds in England".

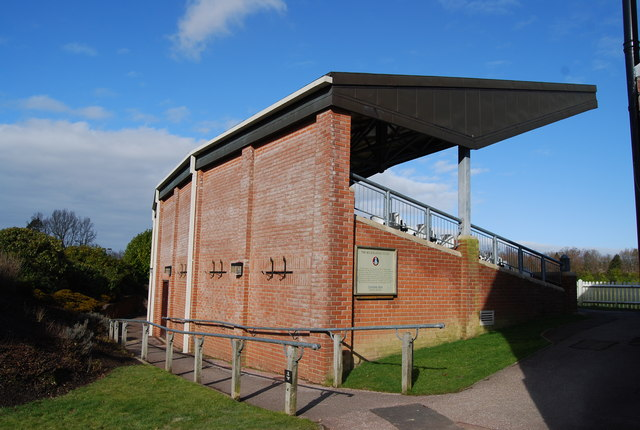
The Bluemantle Stand

In 1995 a permanent covered brick stand was built, named the Bluemantle Stand after the Bluemantle's Cricket Club pavilion which had been built on the site after the fire of 1913. Tunbridge Wells Borough Council has erected a temporary grandstand at the ground for some cricket weeks, sometimes funded by local businesses.

=== 1913 arson ===
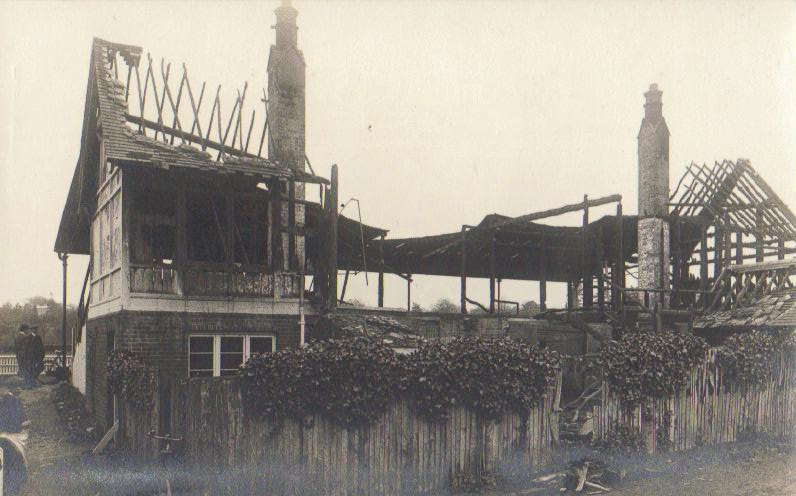
The Nevill Ground pavilion after the 1913 arson attack

On 11 April 1913, the original pavilion was burnt down in an arson attack by militant suffragettes. The fire was discovered by a passing lamplighter and the fire brigade extinguished it within an hour, but too late to save the pavilion. In front of the remains of the building firemen found suffragette literature, an electric lantern and a photograph of leading suffragette Emmeline Pankhurst. It is generally believed that the fire was caused by militant suffragettes as part of a country-wide campaign of arson and other violent opposition to the withdrawal of the 1912 Franchise Bill co-ordinated by the Women's Social and Political Union.

The fire destroyed archives, including a print of the first Canterbury Cricket Week and the Bluemantle's Cricket Club's archives. The attack has often been linked to a comment from an unknown Kent official who is reported to have said "It is not true that women are banned from the pavilion. Who do you think makes the teas?". However women were admitted to all of Kent's pavilions by 1913 and there is no evidence that the comment was ever made.

There was an angry reaction to the attack locally and nationally. The National League for Opposing Woman Suffrage held a meeting in the town with Sir Arthur Conan Doyle, who was a member of Tunbridge Wells Cricket Club, where he called the suffragettes "female hooligans" and compared the attack to "blowing up a blind man and his dog". A new pavilion was built using the original designs after a series of fund raising concerts at the Opera House. Construction was finished in nine weeks, with the building completed just before the start of Tunbridge Wells Cricket Week in July 1913.

== Usage ==
The Nevill Ground is used regularly by Kent Cricket League team, Tunbridge Wells Cricket Club, and annually by Kent County Cricket Club, with the county's Second XI also playing on the ground occasionally. It is also used during the winter by Tunbridge Wells Hockey Club as one of their venues for hockey. It was used for association football until 1903 and was originally used for cycle racing, athletics and archery. It is home to Tunbridge Wells Harriers, a running club, and the outfield was used for important lawn tennis competitions – Tunbridge Wells Lawn Tennis Club adjoins the ground.

=== Tunbridge Wells Cricket Week ===
Kent County Cricket Club use the ground as one of its outgrounds for at least one match each year. After a single match in 1901, the Tunbridge Wells Cricket Festival was established in 1902 and two first-class cricket matches were played every year, with the exception of the truncated 1919 season, until 1992, when the number was reduced. One-day fixtures have been played on the ground in some seasons.

The Nevill Ground was first used as an outground by Kent in 1901 at the behest of George Harris, 4th Baron Harris. In order to assist Kent, Tunbridge Wells Borough Council has contributed around £25,000 annually to cover the running costs of hosting Kent's games at the Nevill Ground. The Nevill Ground was popular with Kent's players due to its surroundings and it was described by cricket historian EW Swanton as "no mean contender for the most delectable English cricket ground."

In 2012, Kent's Friends Life t20 match against Sussex was moved to the St Lawrence Ground after the Nevill Ground was flooded after heavy rainfall leading to the 100th Cricket Week being cut short. The 2016 T20 fixture was the last one-day match to be held by Kent at the Nevill, the movement of one-day fixtures to blocks of games by the ECB meaning it was no longer considered possible to hold shorter matches at Tunbridge Wells.

Kent's match at Tunbridge Wells in 2017 almost had to be moved to another ground due to concerns over the maintenance of the ground by Tunbridge Wells Borough Council. The pitch had been left uncovered by the council's ground staff and had flooded which, combined with poor maintenance of the outfield, meant that Kent's own ground staff had to work with Tunbridge Wells Cricket Club to ensure the game could go ahead. The 2018 fixture at the ground was confirmed in February 2018 after a pre-season pitch inspection by Kent, but was subject to a further inspection prior to the match itself. The match went ahead and the ground continued to be used by the county during the 2019 season. However, it has not been used since, as the venue's facilities are no longer considered to meet the required standards. Kent County Cricket Club says it "remains open to a return to the Nevill Ground in future".

=== 1983 World Cup ===
The Nevill Ground was used as one of the grounds for the 1983 Cricket World Cup, hosting one group stage match between India and Zimbabwe on 18 June 1983. Kapil Dev scored 175 not out, made after the Indian team was initially reduced to 17 for 5, helped India win by 31 runs. India went on to win the tournament – their first World Cup title.

Dev's partnership of 126 runs with Syed Kirmani set a world record for the largest ninth wicket stand in ODI cricket. This match led to the Nevill Ground being held in high regard by Indian cricket fans with there being a view that the match inspired a change in the way cricket was played in India. Leading Indian players such as Sachin Tendulkar and Rahul Dravid have spoken about how India winning the tournament inspired them to dream of playing for their country.

There was no official television footage of the match as BBC cameramen were on strike on the day of the match, the Nevill Ground being ruled as too small and India and Zimbabwe being deemed too "irrelevant" for a camera crew to be sent to the match. Despite this there were reports of an Indian spectator who filmed unofficial coverage of the match with a camcorder. The tape was purchased by Dev after the match for an unknown amount, although it has been claimed that this is an urban legend and that there was no proof of this occurring.

In 2008, to commemorate the 25th anniversary of the game, Dev returned to the Nevill Ground to film a news segment. Afterwards he was welcomed by representatives of Kent County Cricket Club and Tunbridge Wells Borough Council. In 2019, it was used as a filming location for a recreation of the match for the Bollywood film 83.

=== 1993 Women's World Cup ===
The ground was one of the venues used in the 1993 Women's Cricket World Cup, hosting one match between Australia and the West Indies. Australia won by eight wickets.

== Records on the ground ==
A total of 189 first-class matches have been held on the ground, all featuring Kent as the home team. Another 27 List A fixtures have been played, all but one featuring Kent as the home team, the other being the One Day International between India and Zimbabwe held during the 1983 World Cup. Kent have also played six Twenty20 matches on the ground.

All records last updated 17 June 2019

=== First-class cricket ===
- Highest total: 633/8 declared by Kent against Essex, 2015
- Lowest total: 25 by Worcestershire against Kent, 1960
- Highest partnership: 323, 3rd wicket by RWT Key and M van Jaarsveld, for Kent against Surrey, 2005
- Highest individual score: 290, WR Hammond for Gloucestershire against Kent, 1934
- Best bowling in an innings: 10/127, VWC Jupp for Northants against Kent, 1932
- Best bowling in a match: 16/82, AP Freeman for Kent against Northants, 1932

The 633 runs scored by Kent against Essex in 2015 set a new record for the highest score by the county on a home ground. As of 2018 it remains the fourth highest innings score in the county's history, having been surpassed in 2018 at Beckenham.

Kent's County Championship match at the Nevill Ground against Worcestershire in 1960 was, as of 2018, the last first-class match to finish in less than a day. After the match, Kent's Colin Cowdrey called the pitch "disgraceful".

=== List A cricket ===
- Highest total: 314/7 by Sussex against Kent, 1963 (65 over match)
- Lowest total: 99 by Kent against Nottinghamshire, 1996
- Highest partnership: 170, 4th wicket by A Symonds and MJ Walker, for Kent against Lancashire, 2004
- Highest individual score: 175 not out, Kapil Dev for India against Zimbabwe, 1983
- Best bowling: 6/49, SR Barwick for Glamorgan against Kent, 1995

Kapil Dev's 175 not out against Zimbabwe was a One Day International record for the highest number of individual runs scored. This record was later beaten by Viv Richards. The partnership of 126 runs between Kapil Dev and Syed Kirmani set the world record for the highest ninth wicket partnership in an ODI of 126 not out. This record stood for 27 years before being beaten by Angelo Mathews and Lasith Malinga for Sri Lanka.

=== Twenty20 cricket ===
The highest score made in the six T20 matches held on the ground was 182/4 made by Kent in 2009 against Hampshire. Daniel Bell-Drummond made the only century on the ground in T20 cricket, scoring 112 not out in 2016 against Surrey, at the same time setting a new Kent record for any partnership in T20 cricket of 151 runs with Sam Northeast. This record was beaten twice the following year by Bell-Drummond and Joe Denly, although it remains a Kent record for the 2nd wicket in T20 cricket.

== See also ==
- List of Kent County Cricket Club grounds
