= Foxgrove Road, Beckenham =

Sports ground in Beckenham, London, England

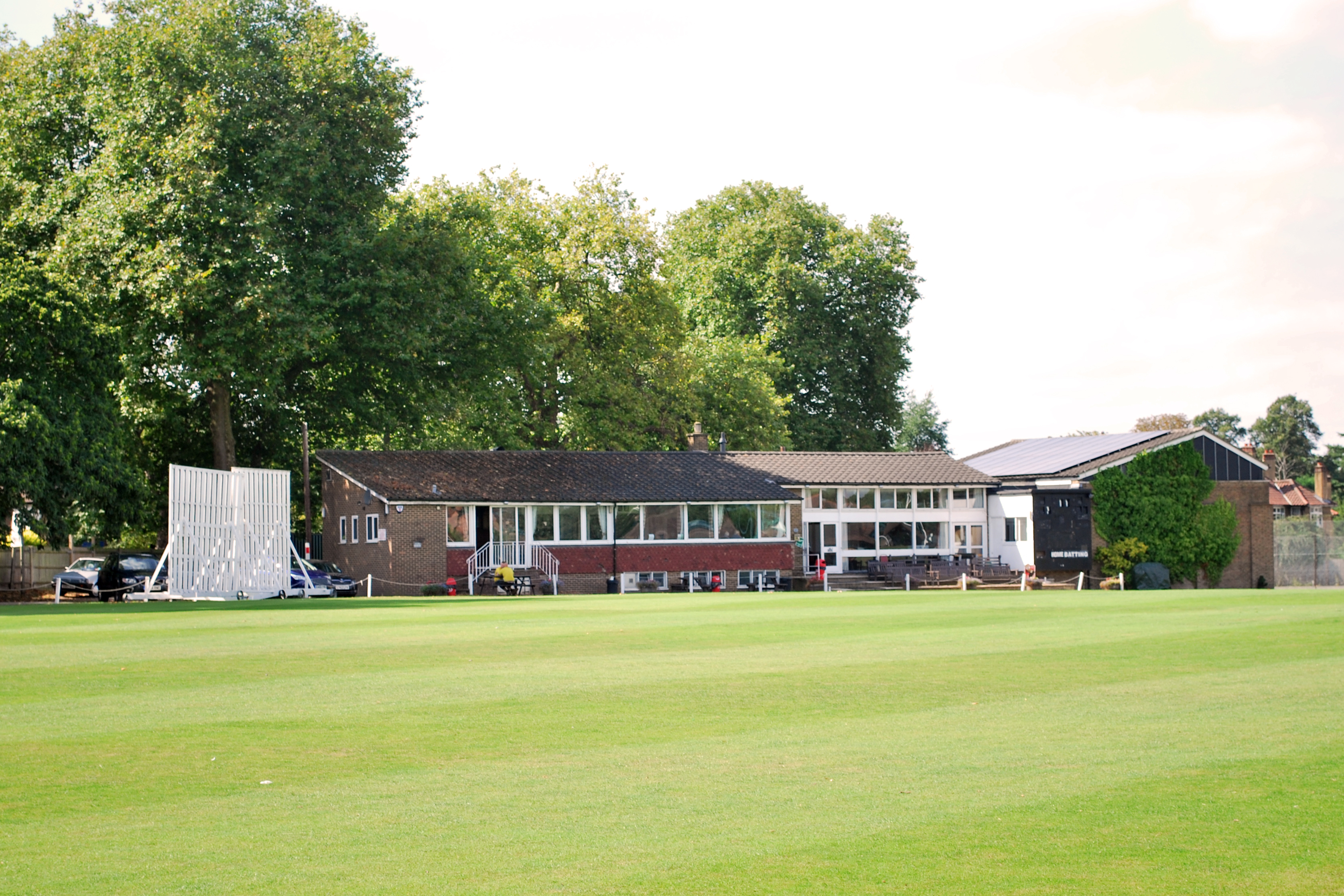
- The cricket pavilion at Foxgrove Road in 2016
- Interactive map of Foxgrove Road, Beckenham

Ground information
- Location: Beckenham, London Borough of Bromley
- Country: England
- Coordinates: 51.414°N 0.021°W
- Establishment: 1866
- Owner: Beckenham Cricket Club

Team information
Beckenham Cricket Club	(1866–present)
Beckenham Lawn Tennis Club	(1879–present)
Kent County Cricket Club	(1886–1905)
- As of 10 September 2016; Source: CricketArchive

Foxgrove Road, Beckenham is a sports ground in Beckenham in the London Borough of Bromley in South East London. The ground is home to Beckenham Cricket Club, a multi-sports club, and has been used as a first-class cricket venue and hosted the Kent Championships, a tennis tournament held annually in the run-up to the Wimbledon Championships. It was also the ground used for the University Hockey Match between Oxford and Cambridge universities. The ground remains in use for cricket and tennis as well as for football, netball and squash and acting as a base for road running.

The ground was part of Foxgrove Farm and was established by Beckenham Cricket Club in 1866. It is on Foxgrove Road, around 500 metres (0.31 mi) north-east of Beckenham town centre. The A2015 road is 200 metres (0.12 mi) to the west of the ground.

== Cricketing history ==
Foxgrove Road was used by Kent County Cricket Club for 14 first-class cricket matches between 1886 and 1905. Beckenham was part of Kent until 1965 and Kent used a number of grounds in what it describes as "Metropolitan Kent". The club maintains a current base at the Kent County Cricket Ground, Beckenham 0.5 miles (0.80 km) from Foxgrove Road.

The first first-class match at the ground was in July 1886 against Surrey, who were Kent's most frequent opponents at the ground. After a Players of the South v Players of the North fixture in 1887, Kent used the ground for a single match in most years until 1905 when Surrey were again their opponents. The touring South Africans played Kent at the ground in 1901 and a match against the Gentlemen of Philadelphia was held in 1903. A number of low scores were recorded on the ground with ten all out totals of under 100.

The ground was used for 17 Minor Counties Championship matches by the Kent Second XI between 1911 and 1957. Surrey were again the most frequent opponents for Kent at the ground, playing six Minor Counties matches there, with Norfolk also playing four times at the ground. The ground remains in use by Beckenham Cricket Club, one of the largest clubs in South East London. Beckenham's open teams play in the Kent Cricket League. Beckenham's women's team play in the Kent Women's Premier League and the Surrey Slam.

=== Primary Club ===
The Primary Club, which is open to cricketers who are out first ball of their innings, was formed at Beckenham Cricket Club in 1955. The club has grown into an international charity making annual donations in excess of £160,000 to a variety of schools and clubs for the blind and partially sighted. Their patron was former England, Kent and Beckenham cricketer Derek Underwood.

=== Records on the ground ===
A total of 15 first-class matches have been played on the ground, all but one featuring Kent as the home team.

- Highest total: 440 by Surrey against Kent, 1886
- Lowest total: 35 by Nottinghamshire against Kent, 1889
- Highest partnership: 146, 1st wicket by CJ Burnup and EW Dillon, for Kent against Middlesex, 1902
- Highest individual score: 127 not out, JR Mason, for Kent against Nottinghamshire, 1896
- Best bowling in an innings: 8/23, GA Lohmann, for Surrey against Kent, 1888
- Best bowling in a match: 14/102, T Richardson, for Surrey against Kent, 1897

== Tennis history ==
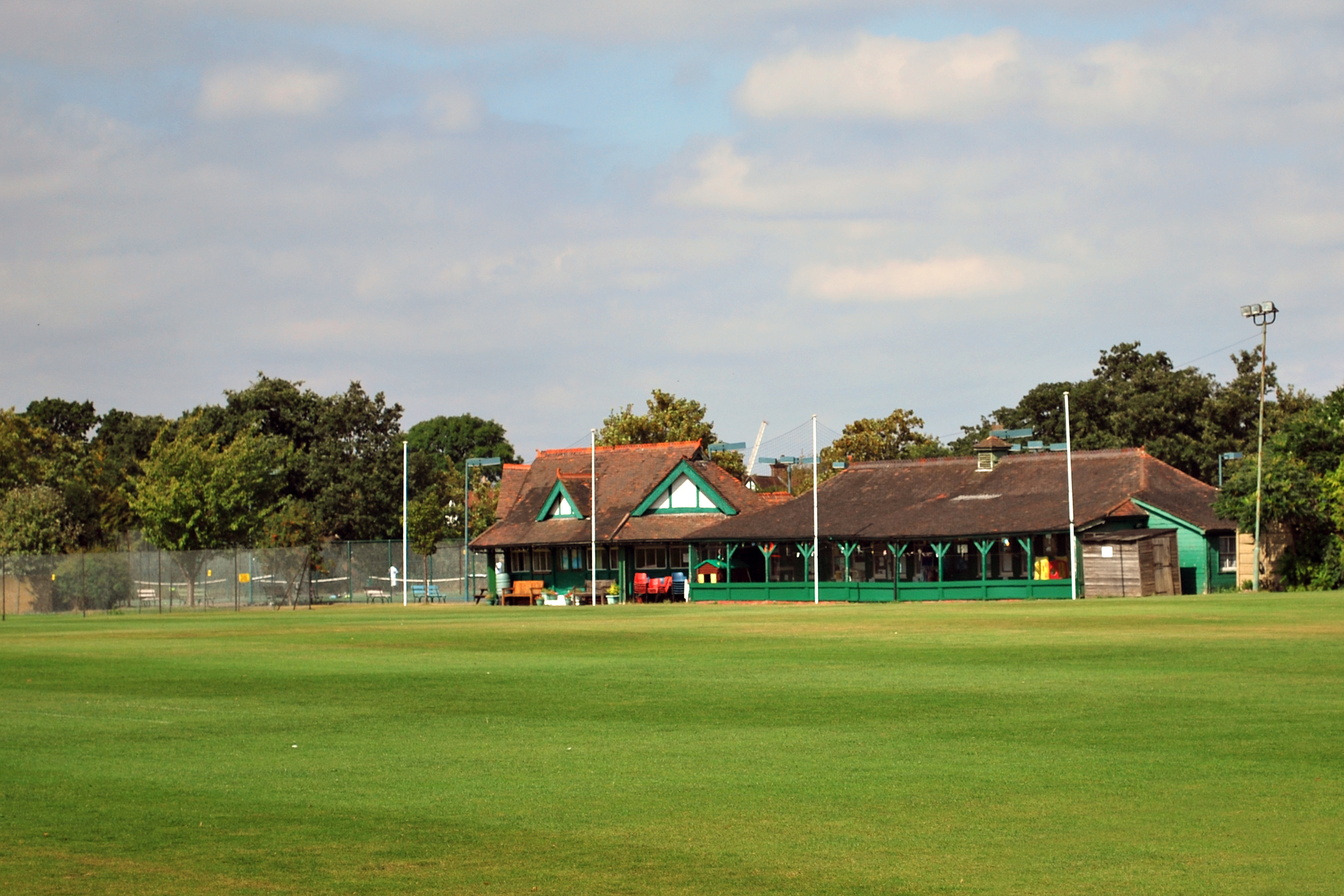
The tennis pavilion at Foxgrove Road in September 2016

Tennis was first played at Foxgrove Road in 1879, originally on three grass courts, and the club is one of the oldest in the world to still be playing at its original location. The ground has 18 courts, including six on grass and 12 on a variety of hard surfaces. The Summer Pavilion at the club, which was built as a Ladies Pavilion in 1896, has Grade II Listed building status. Foxgrove Road hosted a match in the 1922 International Lawn Tennis Challenge (the tournament which later became known as the Davis Cup), with India beating Romania 5–0 at the ground in June.

=== Kent Championships ===
Foxgrove Road hosted the Kent Championships each June from 1886 to 1996. The tournament, also known as the Kent All-Comers' Championships, was held on grass courts laid out on the outfield of the cricket ground. The Championships were known as a "dress rehearsal for Wimbledon" and attracted major world players, with 33 winners of the tournament went on to win the Wimbledon Championships in the same year. It was the first tennis tournament to have a commercial sponsor and in 1968 the Championships were awarded Open status and hosted the world's first Open grass court tennis championship.

== Hockey history ==
Foxgrove Road is the base of Bromley & Beckenham Hockey Club, formed after a merger in 2005, although matches are played at other grounds in the area. The Men's 1st XI play in the South Premier Hockey League and the Women's 1st XI in the East Premier Division.

Foxgrove Road hosted the Oxford versus Cambridge varsity hockey match on 38 occasions from 1909 to 1957.
