= 2022 European Cricket League =

Cricket tournament

- Dates: 7 February – 19 March 2022
- Administrator: European Cricket League
- Cricket format: T10
- Tournament format(s): Round robin and knockout
- Host: Spain
- Champions: (Spain) Pak I Care Badalona (1st title)
- Runners-up: (England) Tunbridge Wells
- Participants: 30
- Player of the series: (Spain) Muhammad Babar
- Most runs: (England) Chris Williams (477)
- Most wickets: (Spain) Muhammad Babar (23)
- Official website: European Cricket Network

The 2022 European Cricket League (abbreviated as ECL22), also known as the 2022 Bet2Ball European Cricket League, was the second edition of the European Cricket League that was held at the Cartama Oval in Málaga, Spain. It was postponed from 2021 due to the COVID-19 pandemic in Spain.

== Background ==
The European Cricket League was founded in 2019 by German cricketer Daniel Weston intended as a way to develop cricket in emerging nations in Europe as a cricket equivalent to football's UEFA Champions League. In 2020, it was announced the European Cricket League expanded from 8 teams to include the national club champions of 30 European countries. This came after Weston signed agreements with several cricket boards of European nations to ensure their domestic champions would be invited.

Spain was announced as the host for the 2021 and 2022 editions. The Cartama Oval in Málaga was chosen as the host city ahead of La Manga, Murcia, who were due to host in 2021. It was announced the 2022 edition would run from 7 February to 25 March 2022.

== Participants ==
The following teams were invited to take part as champions of their national leagues. The draw was made according to International Cricket Council seedings with England's ECB National Club Twenty20 champions Tunbridge Wells entering as top seeds. Jersey's Farmers expressed concern about the scheduling of the tournament due to the Jersey national cricket team's participation in the 2019–2022 ICC Cricket World Cup Challenge League and qualifiers for the 2022 ICC Men's T20 World Cup, as well as their players needing to use leave from their jobs to play. The reigning European Cricket League champions VOC Rotterdam were also invited back to participate.

It was announced that, due to issues with getting visas, that Petersburg Sporting would not be taking part in their group. They would be replaced by the Calpe Giants of Gibraltar.

Location of 2022 ECL teams

Groups	Teams participated in the 2022 European Cricket League					
Group A	(England) Tunbridge Wells	(Denmark) Svanholm	(Austria) Austrian Tigers	(Luxembourg) Star CC	(Finland) Helsinki Titans	(France) Dreux
Group B	(Ireland) Brigade	(Guernsey) Griffins	(Norway) Bjørvika	(Hungary) Royal Tigers	(Bulgaria) Indo Bulgarian	(Croatia) Zagreb Sokol
Group C	(Scotland) Carlton	(Italy) Brescia	(Romania) Cluj	(Czech Republic) Prague CC Kings	(Switzerland) Olten	(Turkey) Zeytinburnnu Zafir
Group D	(Netherlands) V.O.C Rotterdam	(Germany) MSC Frankfurt	(Sweden) Alby Zalmi	(Belgium) Ostend Exiles	Malta Super Kings	(Gibraltar) Calpe Giants
Group E	(Netherlands) HBS Craeyenhout	(Jersey) Farmers	(Spain) Pak I Care Badalona	(Portugal) Malo	(Greece) GEK Corfu	(Cyprus) Punjab Lions Nicosia

== Group stage ==
The Group Stage is to be played across the first 5 weeks of the tournament, with each Group lasting a week. Each week starts with a 3-day round-robin tournament, from which the top 3 progress to a Super 3 playoff. The bottom two teams face off in an eliminator, with the winner going on to play the team who finished 4th. The winner of that game then plays the 3rd place team from the Super 3 playoff, while the Top 2 from that playoff play each other in the first Qualifier. The loser of that game and the winner of the third eliminator then play in the second qualifier. The winners of the Qualifiers then play in the group final to decide the overall Group Winner.

During the Group A final between Tunbridge Wells and Dreux, the match went viral after Dreux's Wahid Abdul and Tunbridge Wells' Chris Williams exchanged phone celebrations.

=== Group A ===
Pos	Team	Pld	W	L	Pts	NRR	Qualification
1	(Austria) Austrian Tigers	5	4	1	8	2.699	Advance to Super 3
2	(England) Tunbridge Wells	5	4	1	8	1.656	Advance to Super 3
3	(France) Dreux	5	3	2	6	3.473	Advance to Super 3
4	(Denmark) Svanholm	5	3	2	6	−0.418	Advance to Eliminator 2
5	(Finland) Helsinki Titans	5	1	4	2	−0.615	Advance to Eliminator 1
6	(Luxembourg) Star CC	5	0	5	0	−5.000	Advance to Eliminator 1

Source: European Cricket Network

=== Super 3 ===
Pos	Team	Pld	W	L	Pts	NRR	Qualification
1	(England) Tunbridge Wells	2	2	0	4	2.550	Advanced to Qualifier 1
2	(Austria) Austrian Tigers	2	1	1	2	0.292	Advanced to Qualifier 1
3	(France) Dreux	2	0	2	0	−2.891	Advanced to Eliminator 3

Source: European Cricket Network

=== Eliminators ===
Eliminator 1
10 February 2022
10:00
Scorecard

Helsinki Titans (Finland); 118/8 (10 overs)	v	(Luxembourg) Star CC; 118/6 (10 overs)
Ahad Qureshi 50 (18); Jatin Madan 3/20 (2 overs)		Jatin Madan 49 (20); Wahid Qureshi 3/12 (2 overs)

Match Tied (Star CC wins the Golden Ball)
Cartama Oval, Cartama
Umpires: Harrison Ward and Suleman Saeed
Player of the match: Jatin Madan

- Star CC won the toss and elected to Bat

Eliminator 2
10 February 2022
14:00
Scorecard

Svanholm (Denmark); 43/0 (4.2 overs)	v	(Luxembourg) Star CC; 44 (8.3 overs)
Wahab Hashimi 23* (12); Jatin Madan 0/15 (2 overs)		Shiv Karan Gill 23 (16); Zeeshan Khan 3/3 (2 overs)

Svanholm beat Star CC by 10 wickets
Cartama Oval, Cartama
Umpires: Harrison Ward and Suleman Saeed
Player of the match: Zeeshan Khan

- Star CC won the toss and elected to bat

Eliminator 3
11 February 2022
10:00
Scorecard

Dreux (France); 101/8 (10 overs)	v	(Denmark) Svanholm; 80/8 (10 overs)
Kamran Ahmadzai 26 (9); Toqeer Ahmad 2/15 (2 overs)		Hamid Shah 21 (14); Kamran Ahmadzai 3/18 (2 overs)

Dreux beat Svanholm by 21 runs
Cartama Oval, Cartama
Umpires: Harrison Ward and Charles Croucher
Player of the match: Kamran Ahmadzai

- Svanholm won the toss and elected to Bowl

=== Qualifiers and Final ===
Qualifier 1
11 February 2022
08:00
Scorecard

Tunbridge Wells (England); 141/4 (10 overs)	v	(Austria) Austrian Tigers; 113/8 (10 overs)
Alex Williams 58 (25); Imran Asif 2/19 (2 overs)		Imran Asif 33 (19); Dave Smith 3/15 (2 overs)

Tunbridge Wells won by 28 runs
Cartama Oval, Cartama
Umpires: Nilkesh Patel and Suleman Saeed
Player of the match: Alex Williams

- Austrian Tigers won the toss and elected to bowl.

Qualifier 2
11 February 2022
13:00
Scorecard

Austrian Tigers (Austria); 83/9 (10 overs)	v	(France) Dreux; 86/3 (6.4 overs)
Ahsan Yousuf 21 (8); Shahzeb Mohammad 3/14 (2 overs)		Hamza Niaz 28 (11); Adal Afzal 2/24 (1.4 overs)

Dreux won by 7 wickets
Cartama Oval, Cartama
Umpires: Suleman Saeed and Subh Navjot Anand
Player of the match: Shahzeb Mohammad

- Austrian Tigers won the toss and elected to bat

Final
11 February 2022
16:00
Scorecard

Tunbridge Wells (England); 128/5 (10 overs)	v	(France) Dreux; 101/8 (10 overs)
Dave Smith 28 (12); Tabush Bhatti 2/20 (2 overs)		Mohammad Nisar 48 (19); Marcus O'Riordan 4/17 (2 overs)

Tunbridge Wells won by 27 runs
Cartama Oval, Cartama
Umpires: Charles Croucher and Nilkesh Patel
Player of the match: Marcus O'Riordan

- Tunbridge Wells won the toss and elected to Bat

=== Group B ===
Pos	Team	Pld	W	L	Pts	NRR	Qualification
1	(Hungary) Royal Tigers	5	4	1	8	1.923	Advanced to Super 3
2	(Ireland) Brigade	5	4	1	8	0.297	Advanced to Super 3
3	(Guernsey) Griffins	5	3	2	6	2.103	Advanced to Super 3
4	(Norway) Bjørvika	5	3	2	6	0.255	Advanced to Eliminator 2
5	(Bulgaria) Indo-Bulgarian	5	1	4	2	0.648	Advanced to Eliminator 1
6	(Croatia) Zagreb Sokol	5	0	5	0	−5.236	Advanced to Eliminator 1

Source: European Cricket Network

=== Super 3 ===
Pos	Team	Pld	W	L	Pts	NRR	Qualification
1	(Ireland) Brigade	2	2	0	4	0.644	Advanced to Qualifier 1
2	(Hungary) Royal Tigers	2	1	1	2	0.623	Advanced to Qualifier 1
3	(Guernsey) Griffins	2	0	2	0	−1.381	Advanced to Eliminator 3

Source: European Cricket Network

=== Eliminators ===
Eliminator 1
17 February 2022
10:00
Scorecard

Indo-Bulgarian (Bulgaria); 149/1 (10 overs)	v	(Croatia) Zagreb Sokol; 111/1 (10 overs)
Jamie Batten 54* (28); Sam Houghton 1/37 (2 overs)		Dan Lazarides 47* (29); Chris Lakov 1/26 (2 overs)

Indo-Bulgarin beat Zagreb Sokol by 38 runs
Cartama Oval, Cartama
Umpires: Shubh Navjot Anand and Suleman Saeed
Player of the match: Jamie Batten

- Zagreb Sokol won the toss and elected to Bowl

Eliminator 2
17 February 2022
14:00
Scorecard

Bjørvika (Norway); 71/0 (6.3 overs)	v	(Bulgaria) Indo-Bulgarian; 70/8 (10 overs)
Chris Lakov 28* (21); Waseem Abbas 2/10 (2 overs)		Qamar Ejaz 33* (19); Jamie Batten 0/11 (2 overs)

Bjørvika beat Indo-Bulgarian by 10 wickets
Cartama Oval, Cartama
Umpires: Nilkesh Patel and Shubh Navjot Anand
Player of the match: Waseem Abbas

- Indo-Bulgarian won the toss and elected to Bat

Eliminator 3
18 February 2022
10:00
Scorecard

Griffins (Guernsey); 63/8 (10 overs)	v	(Norway) Bjørvika; 69/3 (7.5 overs)
Adam Martel 18 (10); Muhammad Afzaal 4/6 (2 overs)		Khurram Shahzad 27* (12); Jordan Martel 2/12 (2 overs)

Bjørvika beat Griffins by 7 wickets
Cartama Oval, Cartama
Umpires: Suleman Saeed and Shubh Navjot Anand
Player of the match: Muhammad Afzaal

- Bjørvika won the toss and elected to Bowl

=== Group C ===
Pos	Team	Pld	W	L	Pts	NRR	Qualification
1	(Scotland) Carlton	5	5	0	10	2.301	Advanced to the Super 3
2	(Switzerland) Olten	5	3	2	6	2.153	Advanced to the Super 3
3	(Romania) Cluj	5	3	2	6	0.760	Advanced to the Super 3
4	(Italy) Brescia	5	2	3	4	3.296	Advanced to Eliminator 2
5	(Czech Republic) Prague Kings	5	2	3	4	1.173	Advanced to Eliminator 1
6	(Turkey) Zeytinburnu Zafer	5	0	5	0	−1.141	Advanced to Eliminator 1

Source: European Cricket Network

=== Super 3 ===
Pos	Team	Pld	W	L	NR	Pts	NRR	Qualification
1	(Scotland) Carlton	2	2	0	0	4	3.076	Advanced to Qualifier 1
2	(Romania) Cluj	2	0	1	1	1	−2.634	Advanced to Qualifier 1
3	(Switzerland) Olten	2	0	1	1	1	−3.331	Advanced to Eliminator 3

Source: European Cricket Network

=== Group D ===
Pos	Team	Pld	W	L	Pts	NRR	Qualification
1	(Germany) MSC Frankfurt	5	5	0	10	2.402	Advanced to the Super 3
2	(Belgium) Ostend Exiles	5	4	1	8	1.636	Advanced to the Super 3
3	(Netherlands) V.O.C Rotterdam	5	3	2	6	1.118	Advanced to the Super 3
4	(Sweden) Alby Zalmi	5	2	3	4	−0.754	Advanced to Eliminator 2
5	Malta Super Kings	5	1	4	2	−0.504	Advanced to Eliminator 1
6	(Gibraltar) Calpe Giants	5	0	5	0	−4.177	Advanced to Eliminator 1

Source: European Cricket Network

=== Super 3 ===
Pos	Team	Pld	W	L	NR	Pts	NRR	Qualification
1	(Germany) MSC Frankfurt	2	1	1	0	2	0.957	Advanced to Qualifier 1
2	(Belgium) Ostend Exiles	2	0	1	1	1	0.645	Advanced to Qualifier 1
3	(Netherlands) V.O.C Rotterdam	2	0	1	1	1	−1.813	Advanced to Eliminator 3

Source: European Cricket Network

=== Group E ===
Pos	Team	Pld	W	L	Pts	NRR	Qualification
1	(Spain) Pak I Care Badalona	5	5	0	10	3.906	Advanced to the Super 3
2	(Netherlands) HBS Craeyenhout	5	3	2	6	0.300	Advanced to the Super 3
3	(Cyprus) Punjab Lions Nicosia	5	3	2	6	0.022	Advanced to the Super 3
4	(Portugal) Malo	5	2	3	4	−0.599	Advanced to Eliminator 2
5	(Jersey) Farmers	5	1	4	2	−1.382	Advanced to Eliminator 1
6	(Greece) GEK Corfu	5	0	5	0	−1.836	Advanced to Eliminator 1

Source: European Cricket Network

=== Super 3 ===
Pos	Team	Pld	W	L	NR	Pts	NRR	Qualification
1	(Spain) Pak I Care Badalona	2	2	0	0	4	1.984	Advanced to Qualifier 1
2	(Cyprus) Punjab Lions Nicosia	2	1	1	0	2	−0.067	Advanced to Qualifier 1
3	(Netherlands) HBS Craeyenhout	2	0	2	0	0	−1.960	Advanced to Eliminator 3

Source: European Cricket Network

==== Eliminators ====
Eliminator 1
10 March 2022
10:00
Scorecard

Farmers (Jersey); 88/2 (7.5 overs)	v	(Greece) GEK Corfu; 85/9 (10 overs)
Asa Tribe 44* (22); Ilias Bardis 2/24 (2 overs)		Tasos Manousis 27 (12); Charles Perchard 2/12 (2 overs)

Farmers beat GEK Corfu by 8 wickets
Cartama Oval, Cartama
Umpires: Steffan Gooch and Joe Foster
Player of the match: Asa Tribe

- Farmers won the toss and elected to Bowl

Eliminator 2
10 March 2022
14:00
Scorecard

Malo (Portugal); 95 (10 overs)	v	(Jersey) Farmers; 97/4 (9.3 overs)
Najam Shahzad 49 (22); Ben Kynman 4/12 (1 over)		Zak Tribe 26 (11); Adnan Gondal 1/19 (2 overs)

Farmers beat Malo by 6 wickets
Cartama Oval, Cartama
Umpires: Tyrone Peters and Asad Ali
Player of the match: Ben Kynman

- Farmers won the toss and elected to Bowl

Eliminator 3
11 March 2022
10:00
Scorecard

HBS Craeyenhout (Netherlands); 95/3 (10 overs)	v	(Jersey) Farmers; 96/4 (10 overs)
Tayo Walbrugh 47* (28); Joel Richardson 2/5 (2 overs)		Asa Tribe 46 (22); Ferdi Vink 2/17 (2 overs)

Farmers beat HBS Craeyenhout by 6 wickets
Cartama Oval, Cartama
Umpires: Steffan Gooch and Joe Foster
Player of the match: Asa Tribe

- Farmers won the toss and elected to bowl

==== Qualifiers and Final ====
Qualifier 1
11 March 2022
8:00
Scorecard

Pak I Care Badalona (Spain); 88/8 (10 overs)	v	(Cyprus) Punjab Lions Nicosia; 94/9 (10 overs)
Sikandar Ali 28 (13); Gurpartap Singh 2/13 (2 overs)		Qasim Anwar 27* (11); Muhammad Babar 2/7 (2 overs)

Punjab Lions Nicosia beat Pak I Care Badalona by 6 runs
Cartama Oval, Cartama
Umpires: Tyrone Peters and Asad Ali
Player of the match: Taranjit Singh

- Pak I Care Badalona won the toss and elected to bowl

Qualifier 2
11 March 2022
13:00
Scorecard

Pak I Care Badalona (Spain); 112/5 (10 overs)	v	(Jersey) Farmers; 71/8 (10 overs)
Muhammad Babar 75 (35); Charles Perchard 2/7 (2 overs)		James Smith 12 (9); Sheroz Ahmed 3/15 (2 overs)

Pak I Care Badalona beat Farmers by 41 runs
Cartama Oval, Cartama
Umpires: Asad Ali and Tyrone Peters
Player of the match: Muhammad Babar

- Farmers won the toss and elected to bowl

Final
11 March 2022
16:00
Scorecard

Pak I Care Badalona (Spain); 93/9 (10 overs)	v	(Cyprus) Punjab Lions Nicosia; 18/5 (3 overs)
Muhammad Kamran 35 (15); Sushil Kumar 2/7 (2 overs)		Gurpartap Singh 6 (5); Muhammad Babar 3/5 (1 over)

Pak I Care Badalona beat Punjab Lions Nicosia by 14 runs (D/L Method)
Cartama Oval, Cartama
Umpires: Steffan Gooch and Joe Foster
Player of the match: Muhammad Babar

- Pak I Care Badalona won the toss and elected to bat.
- Rain reduced Punjab Lions Nicosia's innings to 3 overs.
- According to the DLS method, their target was 33 runs.

== Championship Week ==
The Champions Week features a slightly modified version of the Group Stage model. The 5 group winners play in a double round-robin format from the Monday to Thursday. The top 2 teams after this progress to the 1st Qualifier, while 3rd and 4th go to the Eliminator. The loser of the Qualifier and the Winner of the Eliminator then face off for the right to play the Qualifier winner in the Championship Final. The teams moving on to the Finals week are:

Team
(England) Tunbridge Wells
(Ireland) Brigade
(Italy) Brescia
(Sweden) Alby Zalmi
(Spain) Pak I Care Badalona

Due to adverse weather conditions in Malaga, the first 3 days of competition were suspended. The games were shortened to 5 overs a side, with 10 games on Day 1 (Thursday), and 10 games on Day 2 (Friday), with the Saturday now acting as the Final Day of the tournament

=== Round robin ===
Pos	Team	Pld	W	L	Pts	NRR	Qualification
1	(Spain) Pak I Care Badalona	8	7	1	14	1.492	Advance to Qualifier 1
2	(England) Tunbridge Wells	8	6	2	12	3.781	Advance to Qualifier 1
3	(Italy) Brescia	8	4	4	8	−0.414	Advance to Eliminator
4	(Ireland) Brigade	8	3	5	6	−3.119	Advance to Eliminator
5	(Sweden) Alby Zalmi	8	0	8	0	−1.752	

Source: European Cricket Network

=== Eliminator, Qualifiers and Final ===
Eliminator
19 March 2022
8:00
Scorecard

Bresica (Italy); 96/4 (9.3 overs)	v	(Ireland) Brigade; 95/3 (10 overs)
Ali Raza Islam 41 (21); Ryan MacBeth 3/10 (2 overs)		David Murdock 48 (26); Ali Raza Islam 3/3 (2 overs)

Brescia beat Brigade by 6 wickets
Cartama Oval, Cartama
Umpires: Charles Croucher and Steffan Gooch
Player of the match: Ali Raza Islam

- Brigade won the toss and elected to bat

Qualifier 1
19 March 2022
10.00
Scorecard

Pak I Care Badalona (Spain); 122/7 (10 overs)	v	(England) Tunbridge Wells; 95/6 (10 overs)
Muhammad Babar 30 (10); Bailey Wrightman 2/11 (2 overs)		Ian McLean 35* (15); Atif Muhammad 3/13 (2 overs)

Pak I Care Badalona beat Tunbridge Wells by 27 runs
Cartama Oval, Cartama
Umpires: Asad Ali and Tyrone Peters
Player of the match: Atif Muhammad

- Tunbridge Wells won the toss and elected to bowl

Qualifier 2
19 March 2022
13.00
Scorecard

Tunbridge Wells (England); 150/5 (10 overs)	v	(Italy) Brescia; 120/6 (10 overs)
Alex Williams 49 (18); Bashar Khan 1/16 (2 overs)		Ali Raza Islam 54 (23); Matt Barker 2/6 (2 overs)

Tunbridge Wells beat Brescia by 30 runs
Cartama Oval, Cartama
Umpires: Steffan Gooch and Charles Croucher
Player of the match: Matt Barker

- Brescia won the toss and elected to bowl

Final
19 March 2022
16.00
Scorecard

Pak I Care Badalona (Spain); 84/3 (9 overs)	v	(England) Tunbridge Wells; 81/7 (10 overs)
Mohammad Yasin 24 (20); Michael Waller 1/8 (1 over)		Christian Davis 23 (18); Muhammad Babar 3/14 (2 overs)

Pak I Care Badalona beat Tunbridge Wells by 7 wickets
Cartama Oval, Cartama
Umpires: Asad Ali and Tyrone Peters
Player of the match: Muhammad Babar

- Pak I Care Badalona won the toss and elected to bowl

== Statistics ==
=== Most Runs ===
Runs	Player	Team	Inns	HS	Ave	SR	50	30	4s	6s
477	Chris Williams	(England) Tunbridge Wells	19	61	29.81	248.43	2	6	24	54
445	Alex Williams	(England) Tunbridge Wells	19	58*	40.45	223.61	2	5	34	37
433	Muhammad Babar	(Spain) Pak I Care Badalona	20	75	25.47	220.91	2	4	17	53
384	Babar Hussain	(Italy) Brescia	19	102*	25.60	193.93	1	2	34	27
361	Graeme McCarter	(Ireland) Brigade	18	56*	25.78	184.18	2	4	28	28
356	Ali Raza Islam	(Italy) Brescia	16	54	25.42	215.75	2	4	16	37
310	Yasir Dullu	(Italy) Brescia	19	66*	20.66	174.15	1	3	31	21
282	Azam Khalil	(Sweden) Alby Zalmi	17	53*	20.14	157.54	1	0	25	18
262	Sudesh Wickramasekara	(Czech Republic) Prague CC Kings	6	76*	52.40	231.85	2	2	14	28
261	Zeeshan Kukikhel	(Hungary) Royal Tigers	10	54	32.62	193.33	2	2	25	22
Source: European Cricket Network

=== Most Wickets ===
Wkts	Player	Team	Mat	Ave	Econ	BBI	SR
23	Muhammad Babar	(Spain) Pak I Care Badalona	20	10.43	8.00	3/4	7.82
21	Dave Smith	(England) Tunbridge Wells	18	9.38	8.20	3/6	6.85
21	Ryan MacBeth	(Ireland) Brigade	18	11.66	9.07	3/10	7.71
19	Ali Raza Islam	(Italy) Brescia	17	7.57	7.51	3/0	6.05
18	Iftikhar Hussain	(Ireland) Brigade	17	13.50	9.34	3/10	8.66
17	Muhammad Kamran	(Spain) Pak I Care Badalona	17	10.94	6.88	3/3	9.52
17	Shehroz Ahmed	(Spain) Pak I Care Badalona	20	11.35	8.90	4/8	7.64
16	Tas Qureshi	(Sweden) Alby Zalmi	16	11.50	8.00	2/7	8.62
16	Matt Barker	(England) Tunbridge Wells	18	14.00	8.90	3/8	9.43
16	Neeraj Tiwari	(Cyprus) Punjab Lions Nicosia	9	10.50	9.33	3/11	6.75
Source: European Cricket Network
