= Jelte Schoonheim =

Dutch cricketer (born 1981)

Personal information
- Full name: Jelte D Schoonheim
- Born: 16 November 1981 (age 44); Rotterdam, Netherlands
- Batting: Right-handed
- Bowling: Right arm medium
- Relatives: Rene Schoonheim (father)

International information
- National side: Netherlands

Career statistics
| Competition | First-class | T20I |
|---|---|---|
| Matches | 1 | 1 |
| Runs scored | 17 | – |
| Batting average | 8.50 | – |
| 100s/50s | 0/0 | – |
| Top score | 15 | – |
| Balls bowled | 48 | – |
| Wickets | 0 | – |
| Bowling average | – | – |
| 5 wickets in innings | – | – |
| 10 wickets in match | – | – |
| Best bowling | – | – |
| Catches/stumpings | 0/– | 0/– |
- Source: CricketArchive, 11 October 2008

Jelte D Schoonheim (born 16 November 1981) is a Dutch cricketer. A right-handed batsman, he made his debut for the Dutch cricket team in an Intercontinental Cup game in 2007, where he made scores of 15 and 2 and also bowled a wicketless spell. Although he did not appear for the team for another year, he returned for the Netherlands' second Twenty20 International, although he did not bat or bowl in the match.
