= Tunbridge Wells Cricket Club =

Team information
- City: Royal Tunbridge Wells
- Founded: 1782
- Home ground: Nevill Ground

History
- Kent Cricket League wins: 3
- National Club T20 wins: 1

Tunbridge Wells Cricket Club is an amateur cricket club in Royal Tunbridge Wells, Kent, England. It was founded in 1782 and they play their home matches at the Nevill Ground. As of 2019 they play in the Kent Cricket League Premier Division.

== History ==
Tunbridge Wells Cricket Club was founded in 1782. They first started playing cricket at the Higher Common Ground in Tunbridge Wells. In 1882, to commemorate their centenary, they played a match against the Marylebone Cricket Club.

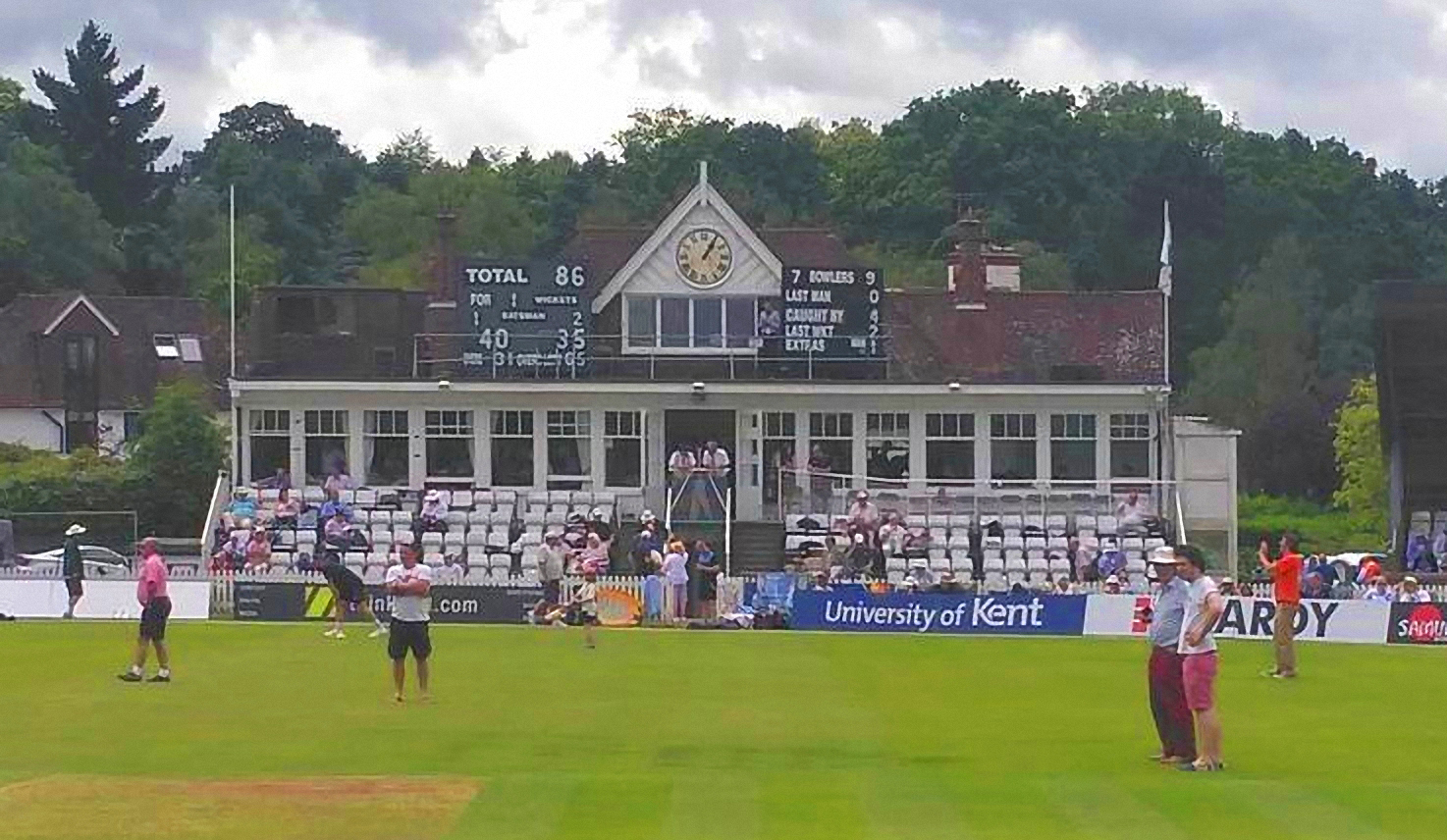
Tunbridge Wells CC's Nevill Ground

In 1895, Tunbridge Wells CC purchased a lease alongside Bluemantle's Cricket Club from William Nevill, 1st Marquess of Abergavenny to establish a cricket ground. As a result, the Nevill Ground was established on a 99-year lease and named after the Marquess. In 1902, Kent County Cricket Club started playing annually at the Nevill Ground, which became Tunbridge Wells Cricket Week.

=== 1913 fire ===
In 1913, the pavilion, including the club's archives, was destroyed in an arson attack by suffragettes, as part of a wider campaign to gain respect and votes for women. The choice of Tunbridge Wells Cricket Club as a target may have been provoked by a comment from a Kent official who was reported to have said prior to the attack: "It is not true that women are banned from the pavilion. Who do you think makes the teas?"

The arsonists left campaign literature and a photograph of activist Emmeline Pankhurst, to draw attention to her incarceration in Holloway Prison, and the practice of force-feeding her and others, when on hunger strikes. Cricket-loving Sir Arthur Conan Doyle reacted angrily to the fire in a meeting of The National League for Opposing Woman Suffrage, dubbing the arsonists “female hooligans” and comparing the attack to “blowing up a blind man and his dog.” The pavilion was rebuilt within nine weeks, in time for the Tunbridge Wells Cricket Week, helped by a series of fund-raising concerts at Royal Tunbridge Wells' Opera House.

=== Recent history ===
In 1970 Tunbridge Wells CC were one of the founder members of the Kent Cricket League. Tunbridge Wells CC hosted a 1983 Cricket World Cup match between India and Zimbabwe where India's Kapil Dev scored 175 not out. They have won the Kent Cricket League three times, most recently in 1988. In 2004, Tunbridge Wells CC was granted the ECB Clubmark by the England and Wales Cricket Board. In 2016 Tunbridge Wells made it to the semi-final of the ECB National Club Twenty20. In 2021, they won the ECB National Club Twenty20 and as the T20 club champions of England, were invited to take part in the 2022 European Cricket League where they finished as runners-up.
