= Kent Cricket League =

ECB Premier League

- Countries: England
- Administrator: Kent Cricket Board
- Format: Limited Overs
- First edition: 1970
- Next edition: 2024
- Tournament format: League
- Number of teams: 10 (Premier Division)
- Current champion: St Lawrence & Highland Court CC
- Most successful: Bromley CC (9)
- Website: https://kcl.play-cricket.com

The Kent Cricket League is the top level of competition for recreational club cricket in Kent, England.

The league was founded in 1970 and the first season of play was 1971. The twelve founding clubs were Ashford, Aylesford Paper Mills, Dartford, Dover, Folkestone, Gore Court, Gravesend, Holmesdale, The Mote, St Lawrence and Highland Court, Sevenoaks Vine, and Tunbridge Wells.

Beckenham, Blackheath, and Bromley joined the league before the 1973 season. Aylesford Paper Mills left after the 1976 season but were replaced by Forest Hill, and then Bexley joined for the 1978 season. Forest Hill closed down in 1980, but Hayes (Kent) and Midland Bank (now New Beckenham) joined in 1982 to bring the number of clubs in the league up to seventeen.

A major change took place before the 1996 season, when the league absorbed the East Kent Cricket League and the South Thames Cricket League. A new structure with three divisions was introduced, and for the first time there was promotion and relegation.

From 1999 the Kent League was a designated ECB Premier League. From 1999 to 2002, the league experimented with matches played over two days on consecutive Saturdays and was the only ECB Premier League to do this, but it reverted to one day cricket in time for the 2003 season.

Until the 2019 season the Kent League had six divisions each containing ten clubs, and below these six divisions lay the Kent Regional Cricket League. The two leagues amalgamated in time for the 2023 season, when there was a total of thirty divisions.

The 2020 competition was cancelled because of the COVID-19 pandemic, and the Kent Cricket League was the only ECB Premier League in England which chose not to organise any kind of replacement competition for the later part of the season when cricket again became possible. Normal service was resumed when a full season of competitive matches was held in 2021.

== Champions ==
- League Champions 1971–1990
  Year	Club
  1971	Ashford
  1972	Sevenoaks Vine
  1973	St Lawrence and Highland Court
  1974	The Mote
  1975	The Mote
  1976	Tunbridge Wells
  1977	The Mote
  1978	Sevenoaks Vine
  1979	Holmesdale
  1980	The Mote
  1981	Dover
  1982	Blackheath
  1983	Beckenham
  1984	Blackheath
  1985	Ashford
  1986	Dover
  1987	Tunbridge Wells
  1988	Tunbridge Wells
  1989	Folkestone
  1990	Gravesend
- League Champions 1991–2010
  Year	Club
  1991	Bromley
  1992	Bromley
  1993	Bromley
  1994	St Lawrence and Highland Court
  1995	The Mote
  1996	Bexley
  1997	Sevenoaks Vine
  1998	St Lawrence and Highland Court
  1999	The Mote
  2000	St Lawrence and Highland Court
  2001	Folkestone
  2002	Bromley
  2003	St Lawrence and Highland Court
  2004	Bromley
  2005	Bromley
  2006	Bromley
  2007	St Lawrence and Highland Court
  2008	Hartley Country Club
  2009	Bromley
  2010	Bromley
- League Champions 2011–Present
  Year	Club
  2011	Hartley Country Club
  2012	Hartley Country Club
  2013	Hartley Country Club
  2014	Sevenoaks Vine
  2015	Hartley Country Club
  2016	Hartley Country Club
  2017	Beckenham
  2018	Blackheath
  2019	Beckenham
  2020	No competition
  2021	Bexley
  2022	Hayes
  2023	Lordswood
  2024	Blackheath
  2025	Tunbridge Wells
  2026	St Lawrence & Highland Court

== Premier 1st XI Performance by season from 1999 ==
Key
Gold	Champions
Blue	Left league
Red	Relegated

Performance by season, from 1999
Club	1999	2000	2001	2002	2003	2004	2005	2006	2007	2008	2009	2010	2011	2012	2013	2014	2015	2016	2017	2018	2019	2021	2022	2023	2024	2025	2026
Ashford	5	8	10																								
Beckenham (Note: Beckenham entered into a merger after the 2000 season and became Beckenham and Sydenham, but this merger was dissolved before the 2008 season and Beckenham took the place in the Premier Division.)		5								4	10			5	6	6	3	5	1	8	1	8	10				
Beckenham and Sydenham			9			4	6	3	3																		
Bexley	8	3	7	5	7	5	3	9			5	5	4	7	7	5	5	4	2	7	2	1	3	2	7	3	6
Bickley Park	6	9					2	7	9		4	6	8	8	5	10				6	6	5	9		9		
Blackheath								5	4	5	9		6	2	3	4	4	2	5	1	8	6	4	6	1	7	4
Broadstairs					8	10			10																		
Bromley	2	2	5	1	4	1	1	1	2	2	1	1	2	4	4	7	8	9				10				4	5
Bromley Common																				10							
Canterbury														9		9					9				10		
Dartford			6	9														10									
Folkestone	7	4	1	7	6	7	8	10									10										
Gore Court						6	5	4	8	6	8	10															
Hartley Country Club										1	2	2	1	1	1	3	1	1	9								
Hayes																							1	5	4	2	2
Holmesdale																			10			9		10		10	
HSBC																					10						
Lordswood				6	5	9			6	9		9	3	6	2	2	6	7	4	2	7	7	7	1	6	5	10
Minster																							2	7	2	8	9
The Mote	1	7	2	4	10							4	9														
Orpington		10		10																							
St Lawrence and Highland Court (Note: St Lawrence and Highland Court were relegated after the 2010 season because they did not have the required Clubmark accreditation.)	3	1	3	2	1	2	7	2	1	3	7	3												4	3	6	1
Sandwich Town							9			10						8	9		3	5	5	2	8	8	8	9	
Sevenoaks Vine	4	6	4	3	2	8	4	6	7	7	6	7	5	3	8	1	2	6	8	4	4	4	6	9			7
Sibton Park													10		9												
Tenterden																		3	6	9							
Tunbridge Wells	9		8	8	9			8	5	8	3	8	7	10			7	8	7	3	3	3	5	3	5	1	3
Whitstable	10				3	3	10								10												8
References																											

== National Club Championship ==
Blackheath are the league's most successful club in the National Knockout Cup, winning twice (1971, 2015) against Ealing and Northern respectively, while losing in the final once (1981) to Scarborough. Bromley and Bexley both played in back-to-back finals with Bromley following a 2006 defeat to South Northumberland with a 2007 victory over Kibworth, while Bexley lost a tied game to Cuckney due to losing more wickets in 2023, the year after beating Nantwich by a single run. The only other Kent team to make a final appearance were The Mote who lost to Wolverhampton in 1973.
